= Konkona Sen Sharma filmography =

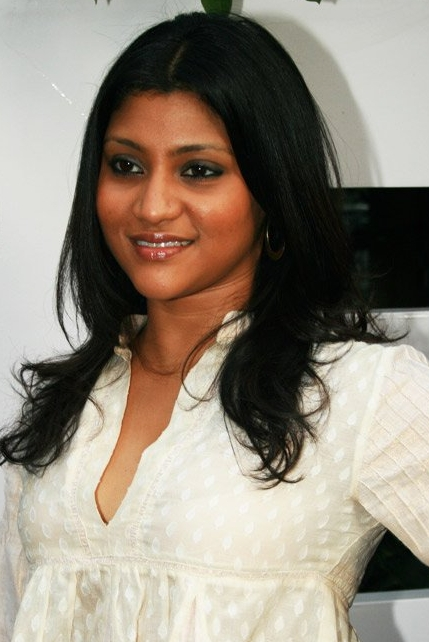
Konkona Sen Sharma in 2007

Konkona Sen Sharma is an Indian actress and filmmaker known for her work in Bengali and Hindi films. She made her debut as a child artist in the 1983 film Indira, and had her first leading role as an adult in the Bengali thriller Ek Je Aachhe Kanya (2000). She gained recognition with the English-language film Mr. and Mrs. Iyer (2002), directed by her mother, which won her the National Film Award for Best Actress. Sen Sharma forayed into Hindi cinema with the drama Page 3 (2005) and won two consecutive Filmfare Awards for Best Supporting Actress for her performances in the dramas Omkara (2006) and Life in a... Metro (2007), with the former also winning her the National Film Award for Best Supporting Actress. Her other notable films during this period include 15 Park Avenue (2005), Dosar (2006), Laaga Chunari Mein Daag (2007), Luck By Chance (2009), Wake Up Sid (2009) and Atithi Tum Kab Jaoge? (2010).

Sen Sharma achieved further success with starring roles in Ek Thi Daayan (2013), Goynar Baksho (2014), Talvar (2015) and Lipstick Under My Burkha (2017). She made her directorial debut with the drama A Death in the Gunj (2017), which won her the Filmfare Award for Best Debut Director. She also received praise for starring in the anthology film Ajeeb Daastaans (2021) and for directing a segment in Lust Stories 2 (2023).

Sen Sharma achieved further success with starring roles in Ek Thi Daayan (2013), Goynar Baksho (2014), Talvar (2015) and Lipstick Under My Burkha (2017). She made her directorial debut with the drama A Death in the Gunj (2017), which won her the Filmfare Award for Best Debut Director. She also received praise for starring in the anthology film Ajeeb Daastaans (2021) and for directing a segment in Lust Stories 2 (2023).

== Films ==
Key
†	Denotes films that have not yet been released

Year	Film	Role	Language	Notes	Ref.
1983	Indira	Child artist	Bengali		
1994	Amodini	Teenage step mother	Bengali		
1994	Unishe April		Bengali	Cameo appearance	
2000	Paromitar Ek Din		Bengali	Cameo appearance	
2001	Ek Je Aachhe Kanya	Ria	Bengali		
2002	Titli	Titli	Bengali		
2002	Mr. and Mrs. Iyer	Meenakshi Iyer	English		
2004	Chai Pani Etc.	Shanti / Radha Joshi	English		
2005	Amu	Kaju "Amu"	English		
2005	Page 3	Madhvi Sharma	Hindi		
2005	15 Park Avenue	Mithi	English		
2006	Dosar	Kaberi Chatterjee	Bengali		
2006	Mixed Doubles	Malti	Hindi		
2006	Yun Hota To Kya Hota	Tilottima Punj	Hindi		
2006	Omkara	Indu	Hindi		
2006	Deadline: Sirf 24 Ghante	Sanjana	Hindi		
2007	Traffic Signal	Noori	Hindi		
2007	Meridian	Pramilla	Hindi		
2007	Life in a... Metro	Shruti Ghosh	Hindi		
2007	Laaga Chunari Mein Daag	Shubhavari 'Shubhi/Chutki' Sahay	Hindi		
2007	Aaja Nachle	Anokhi Anokhelal	Hindi		
2008	Fashion	Herself	Hindi	Special appearance	
2008	Dil Kabaddi	Simi	Hindi		
2008	8	Zeinab	English	Segment "How Can It Be?"	
2009	The President Is Coming	Maya Roy	English		
2009	Luck by Chance	Sona Mishra	Hindi		
2009	Wake Up Sid	Aisha Banerjee	Hindi		
2010	Atithi Tum Kab Jaoge	Munmun	Hindi		
2010	Right Yaa Wrong	Radhika Patnaik	Hindi		
2010	Mirch	Lavni/Anita	Hindi		
2011	7 Khoon Maaf	Nandini	Hindi	Cameo appearance	
2011	Iti Mrinalini	Mrinalini 'Mili' Mitra	Bengali		
2013	Shunyo Awnko	Raka Biswas	Bengali		
2013	Goynar Baksho	Shomlata	Bengali		
2013	Ek Thi Daayan	Diana	Hindi		
2013	Blind Night	Ninu	Hindi		
2013	Sunglass	Chitra	Hindi		
2013	Sunglass	Chitra	Bengali		
2013	Shesher Kobita	Labannya	Bengali		
2015	Shajarur Kanta	Deepa Bhatto	Bengali		
2015	Kadambari	Kadambari Devi	Bengali		
2015	Gour Hari Dastaan	Lakshmi Das	Hindi		
2015	Talvar	Nutan Tandon	Hindi		
2015	Saari Raat	The wife	Hindi		
2015	Nayantara's Necklace	Nayantara	Hindi		
2016	Akira	SP Rabiya	Hindi		
2017	Lipstick Under My Burkha	Shireen Aslam	Hindi		
2018	Bird of Dusk	Herself	English		
2018	Bird of Dusk	Herself	Bengali		
2019	A Monsoon Date	Young Woman	Hindi	Short film	
2020	Cargo	Mandakini	Hindi	Cameo appearance	
2020	Dolly Kitty Aur Woh Chamakte Sitare	Dolly	Hindi		
2021	Ramprasad Ki Tehrvi	Seema	Hindi		
2021	Ajeeb Daastaans	Bharti Mandal	Hindi		
2021	The Rapist	Naina Malik	Hindi		
2023	Kuttey	Lakshmi Sharma	Hindi		
2024	Chashma	Aarti	Hindi	Short film	
2025	Metro... In Dino	Kajol Ghosh Sisodiya	Hindi		
2026	Accused	Dr. Geetika	Hindi	Netflix film	
2026	Lust Stories 3	Shonali		Netflix film	

== As filmmaker ==
Year	Film	Director	Writer	Language	Notes
2006	Naamkoron	Yes	Yes	Bengali	Short film
2017	A Death in the Gunj	Yes	Yes	English; Hindi; Bengali	
2023	Lust Stories 2	Yes	Yes	Hindi	Anthology film Segment : The Mirror, voice-over role
2026	Welcome To Khoya Mahal	Yes	Yes	Hindi	

== Television ==
Year	Title	Role	Language	Notes
1989	Picnic	Daughter	Bengali	Child artist
2005	Karkat Rashi	College girl	Hindi	Television film
2009	54th Filmfare Awards	Co-host	English	
2013	Ek Thhi Naayka	Herself	Hindi	Mini-series
2018	Side Hero	Herself	Hindi	Episode: "Aaj Ki Party"
2020–2023	Mumbai Diaries	Chitra Das	Hindi	
2024	Killer Soup	Swati Shetty	Hindi	
2025	Search: The Naina Murder Case	ACP Sanyukta Das	Hindi	JioHotstar, Applause Entertainment
