= Producers Guild Film Award for Best Actress in a Supporting Role =

Annual Indian film award

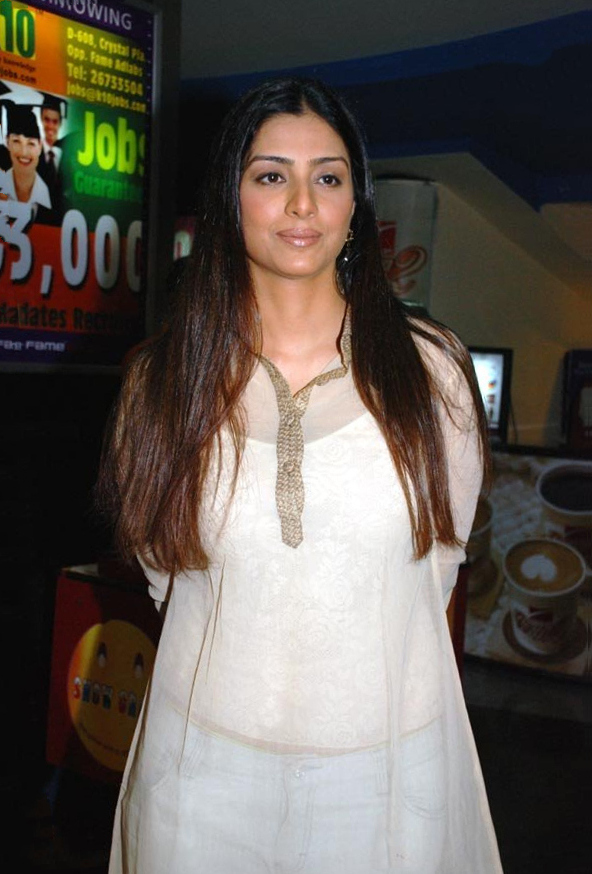
- 2016 Recipient Tabu & Tanvi Azmi
- Awarded for: Best Performance by an Actress in a Supporting Role
- Country: India
- Presented by: Film & Television Producers Guild
- First award: 2004 (for performances in films released around 2003)
- Final award: 2016 (for performances in films released around 2015)
- Currently held by: Tabu, Drishyam (2015); Tanvi Azmi, Bajirao Mastani (2015)
- Website: Producers Guild Film Awards

The Producers Guild Film Award for Best Actress in a Supporting Role (previously known as the Apsara Award for Best Actress in a Supporting Role) is given by the producers of the film and television guild as part of its annual award ceremony for Hindi films, to recognise a female actor who has delivered an outstanding performance in a supporting role. Following its inception in 2004, no one was awarded in 2005 and 2007.

† - indicates the performance also won the Filmfare Award.
‡ - indicates the performance was also nominated for the Filmfare Award.
§ - indicates a Producers Guild Film Award-winning performance that was not nominated for a Filmfare Award.

== Superlatives ==
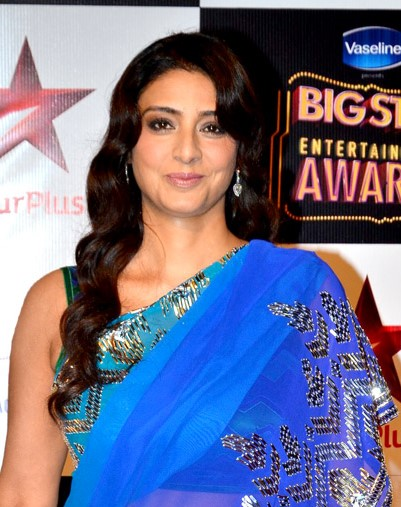
Tabu holds the record of maximum awards in the category, with two consecutive wins

Superlative	Actor	Record
Actress with most awards	Tabu	2
Actress with most nominations	Divya Dutta; Konkona Sen Sharma	3
Actress with most nominations without ever winning	Supriya Pathak; Kalki Koechlin; Dimple Kapadia; Anushka Sharma	2

Tabu with two consecutive wins (2015-2016), has more Best Supporting Actress wins than any other actress.

There has been only one tie in the history of this category. This occurred in 2016 when Tabu and Tanvi Azmi were both given the award.

Divya Dutta and Konkona Sen Sharma hold the record for most nominations in the Best Supporting Actress category, with 3, followed by Supriya Pathak, Kirron Kher, Kalki Koechlin, Kangana Ranaut, Dimple Kapadia, Anushka Sharma & Tabu who have 2 nominations each.

=== Multiple nominees ===
- 3 Nominations : Divya Dutta, Konkona Sen Sharma
- 2 Nominations : Kirron Kher, Kangana Ranaut, Supriya Pathak, Kalki Koechlin, Dimple Kapadia, Anushka Sharma & Tabu

== Winners and nominees ==
Winners are listed first in bold, followed by the other nominees.

=== 2000s ===
Year	Actress	Film	Character
2004
2004	**Jaya Bachchan** †	**Kal Ho Naa Ho**	**Jennifer Kapur**
2004	Divya Dutta	Joggers' Park	Chatterjee's daughter
2004	Juhi Chawla	Jhankaar Beats	Shanti
2004	Pratima Kazmi	Waisa Bhi Hota Hai Part II	Gangu Tai
2004	Preity Zinta	Armaan	Sonia Kapoor
2004	Sandali Sinha	Pinjar	Lajjo
2005	No award	--	--
2006
2006	**Ayesha Kapur** †	**Black**	**Michelle McNally**
2006	Kirron Kher	Hum Tum	Parminder Prakash/Bobby
2006	Konkona Sen Sharma	Page 3	Madhvi Sharma
2006	Priyanka Chopra ‡	Aitraaz	Sonia Roy
2006	Rani Mukerji ‡	Veer-Zaara	Saamiya Siddiqui
2007	No award	--	--
2008
2008	**Konkona Sen Sharma** †	**Life in a... Metro**	**Shruti**
2008	Ashwini Kalsekar	Johnny Gaddaar	Varsha
2008	Chak De girls	Chak De! India	Chak De girls
2008	Raima Sen	Honeymoon Travels Pvt. Ltd.	Milly Sen
2008	Shefali Shah	Gandhi, My Father	Kasturba Gandhi
2009
2009	**Kangana Ranaut** †	**Fashion**	**Shonali Gujral**
2009	Ila Arun	Welcome to Sajjanpur	Ramsakhi Pannawali
2009	Katrina Kaif	Race	Sophia
2009	Shahana Goswami ‡	Rock On!!	Debbie
2009	Supriya Pathak	Sarkar Raj	Pushpa Nagre

=== 2010s ===
Year	Actress	Film	Character
2010
2010	**Kirron Kher** §	**Kurbaan**	**Aapa**
2010	Dimple Kapadia ‡	Luck by Chance	Neena Walia
2010	Kalki Koechlin †	Dev.D	Lené/Chanda (Chandramukhi)
2010	Smita Jaykar	Ajab Prem Ki Ghazab Kahani	Sharda Sharma
2010	Supriya Pathak ‡	Wake Up Sid	Sarita
2011
2011	**Prachi Desai** ‡	**Once Upon a Time in Mumbaai**	**Mumtaz**
2011	Farrukh Jaffar	Peepli Live	Amma
2011	Priyamani	Raavan	Jamuni
2011	Ratna Pathak Shah ‡	Golmaal 3	Geeta
2011	Shernaz Patel	Guzaarish	Devyani Dutta
2012
2012	**Parineeti Chopra** ‡	**Ladies vs Ricky Bahl**	**Dimple Chaddha**
2012	Aditi Rao Hydari	Rockstar	Sheena
2012	Divya Dutta	Stanley Ka Dabba	Rosy Miss
2012	Sulagna Panigrahi	Murder 2	Reshma
2012	Swara Bhaskar ‡	Tanu Weds Manu	Payal
2013
2013	**Dolly Ahluwalia** ‡	**Vicky Donor**	**Mrs. Arora**
2013	Anushka Sharma †	Jab Tak Hai Jaan	Akira Rai
2013	Diana Penty	Cocktail	Meera Sahni
2013	Gauahar Khan	Ishaqzaade	Chand Bibi
2013	Priya Anand	English Vinglish	Radha
2014
2014	**Divya Dutta** ‡	**Bhaag Milkha Bhaag**	**Ishri Kaur**
2014	Deepti Naval	Inkaar	Mrs. Kamdhar
2014	Kalki Koechlin ‡	Yeh Jawaani Hai Deewani	Aditi Mehra
2014	Kangana Ranaut	Krrish 3	Kaya
2014	Raashi Khanna	Madras Cafe	Ruby Singh
2014	Richa Chaddha	Goliyon Ki Raasleela Ram-Leela	Rasila
2015
2015	**Tabu** †	**Haider**	**Ghazala Meer**
2015	Amrita Singh ‡	2 States	Kavita Malhotra
2015	Dimple Kapadia ‡	Finding Fanny	Mrs. Rosalina "Rosie" Eucharistica
2015	Huma Qureshi	Dedh Ishqiya	Muniya
2015	Lisa Haydon ‡	Queen	Vijaylakshmi
2015	Revathy	2 States	Radha Swaminathan
2016
2016	**Tabu** ‡	**Drishyam**	**Inspector General Meera Deshmukh**
2016	**Tanvi Azmi** ‡	**Bajirao Mastani**	**Radhabai**
2016	Anushka Sharma ‡	Dil Dhadakne Do	Farah Ali
2016	Konkona Sen Sharma	Talvar	Nutan Tandon
2016	Radhika Apte	Badlapur	Kanchan (Koko)

== See also ==
- Producers Guild Film Awards
- Producers Guild Film Award for Best Actress in a Leading Role
