= Konkona Sen Sharma =

Indian actress and filmmaker (born 1979)

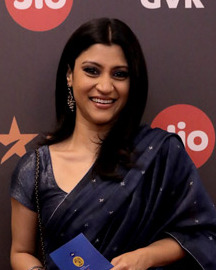
- Sen Sharma in 2019
- Born: 3 December 1979 (age 46); Calcutta, West Bengal, India
- Education: St. Stephen's College, Delhi
- Occupations: Actress; filmmaker
- Years active: 1994–present
- Notable work: Full list
- Spouse: Ranvir Shorey (m. 2010; div. 2020)
- Children: 1
- Parents: Mukul Sharma (father); Aparna Sen (mother)

Konkona Sen Sharma (Bengali: [kɔŋkɔna ʃen ʃɔrma]; born 3 December 1979) is an Indian actress and filmmaker who works in Bengali and Hindi films. She has received several awards, including two National Film Awards and three Filmfare Awards. The child of filmmaker and actress Aparna Sen, she is primarily known for her work in independent films, in addition to working in mainstream films.

She debuted as a child artist in the film Indira (1983), and had her first leading role as an adult in the Bengali thriller Ek Je Aachhe Kanya (2000). She gained recognition with the English-language film Mr. and Mrs. Iyer (2002), directed by her mother, which won her the National Film Award for Best Actress,. Sen Sharma forayed into Hindi cinema with the drama Page 3 (2005) and won two consecutive Filmfare Awards for Best Supporting Actress for her performances in the dramas Omkara (2006) and Life in a... Metro (2007), with the former also winning her the National Film Award for Best Supporting Actress. Her other notable films during this period include 15 Park Avenue (2005), Dosar (2006), Laaga Chunari Mein Daag (2007), Luck By Chance (2009), Wake Up Sid (2009) and Atithi Tum Kab Jaoge? (2010).

Sen Sharma achieved further success with starring roles in Ek Thi Daayan (2013), Goynar Baksho (2014), Talvar (2015) and Lipstick Under My Burkha (2017). She made her directorial debut with the drama A Death in the Gunj (2017), which won her the Filmfare Award for Best Debut Director. She also received praise for starring in the anthology film Ajeeb Daastaans (2021) and for directing a segment in Lust Stories 2 (2023).

== Early life ==
Konkona Sen Sharma was born on 3 December 1979. Her father Mukul Sharma was a science writer and journalist and her mother Aparna Sen is an actress and film director. She has an elder sister, Kamalini Chatterjee. Sen Sharma's maternal grandfather, Chidananda Dasgupta, was a film critic, scholar, professor, writer and one of the co-founders of the Calcutta Film Society. Her grandmother Supriya Dasgupta was a cousin of legendary modern Bengali poet Jibanananda Das.

Sen Sharma appeared as a child artist in the Bengali film Indira (1983), and later as a teenager in Amodini (1994). She graduated from St. Stephen's College, Delhi with a Bachelor's degree in English in 2001. She was a student of Modern High School for Girls.

== Career ==
=== Early work and breakthrough (2001–2004) ===
In 2001, she made her adult debut in the Bengali film Ek Je Aachhe Kanya, in which she played a negative character. This was followed by a role in Rituparno Ghosh's acclaimed film Titli (2002), opposite Mithun Chakraborty and her mother Aparna Sen. These films earned her critical acclaim and helped her gain notice in Bengali cinema.

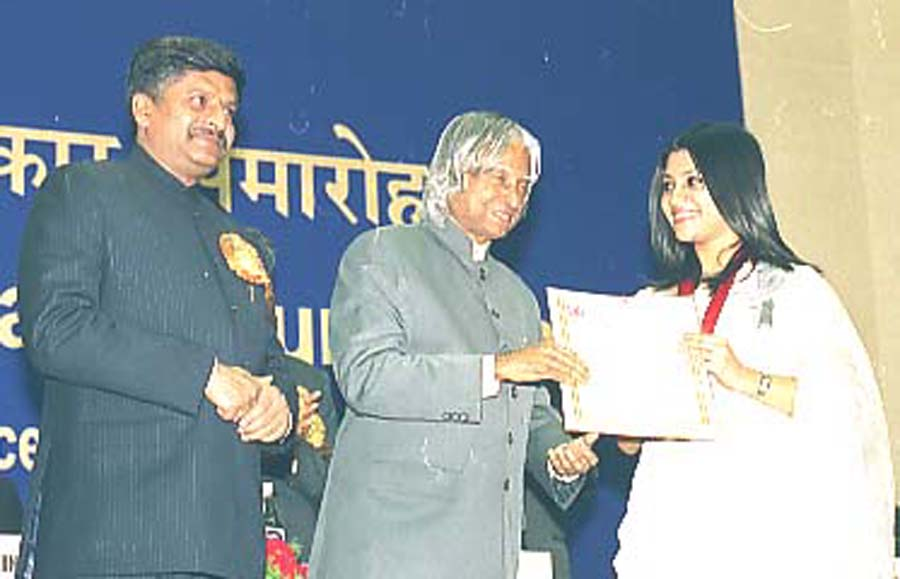
Sen Sharma receiving the National Award for Mr. and Mrs. Iyer (2002) from president Dr. Abdul Kalam in 2003.

Sen Sharma achieved her breakthrough in Indian cinema with the English-language drama Mr. and Mrs. Iyer, directed by Aparna Sen opposite Rahul Bose. The film told the story of two strangers during a fateful bus journey amidst the carnages of a communal strife in India. It performed moderately well at the box-office, but earned widespread critical acclaim from domestic and international critics upon release. Sen Sharma's performance as a Tamil housewife and her mastery of the accent received universal acclaim and earned her the National Film Award for Best Actress. Praising her performance in the film, Filmfare wrote, "What's special about her performance as Meenakshi Iyer is not the effort she put into it as much as the apparent lack of it. [...] Be it her squabbling with the urbane photographer Jehangir Chaudhary or her gently reprimanding him about how her name is pronounced ('It's Mee-naa-kshi not Minakshi') or even when she is screaming at her infant, you believe it's Meenakshi you’ve met. And therein lies the key to her iconic performance." Her performance was later included in the 2010 issue of the "Top 80 Iconic Performances" by Filmfare.

In 2004, she worked in an independent English language film titled Chai Pani Etc..., made by independent maker Manu Rewal. The film drew huge response at the 35th International Film Festival of India but had a delayed theatrical release a year later and became a box office disaster.

=== Critical recognition and success (2005–2010) ===
In 2005, Sen Sharma starred in Madhur Bhandarkar's drama Page 3, which saw her portray the role of a smart journalist who steps into the world of Page 3 culture media and journalism in the city of Mumbai. Upon release, the film received high critical acclaim, and emerged as a moderate commercial success at the box-office. Page 3 helped Sen Sharma gain notice in Hindi cinema and earned her the Zee Cine Award for Best Female Debut. The same year, she also starred alongside Waheeda Rehman, Shabana Azmi and Bose in her mother's directorial 15 Park Avenue, which saw her play a mentally-ill woman, which also earned her critical praise, despite the film's commercial failure.

Sen Sharma was next offered the lead role in Mira Nair's Hollywood drama The Namesake (2007), but owing to clashing dates with other films, she could not commit to the project. Following a critically-acclaimed performance as a mentally-ill woman in the drama 15 Park Avenue (2006), she portrayed a middle-aged village woman who unknowingly becomes a pawn in her husband's scheme in Vishal Bhardwaj's crime drama Omkara (2006). Starring an ensemble cast of Ajay Devgn, Kareena Kapoor, Saif Ali Khan, Vivek Oberoi and Bipasha Basu alongside Sen Sharma, the film opened to widespread critical acclaim, with high praise for her performance. However, due to its dark heresy and strong language which kept away family audiences, it emerged as a moderate commercial success at the box-office. Her performance in the film earned her the National Film Award and the Filmfare Award for Best Supporting Actress. Her next release was the suspense thriller Deadline: Sirf 24 Ghante (2006), which was a critical and commercial disaster. The same year, she made her directorial debut with an 18-minute Bengali short film titled Naamkoron (Naming Ceremony) for the Kala Ghoda Film Festival. Following this, she starred alongside Prosenjit Chatterjee in the Bengali drama Dosar, directed by Rituporno Ghosh. The film premiered at several international film festivals and emerged as a sleeper hit at the box-office. Her performance in the film won her the Best Actress award at the New York Indian Film Festival.

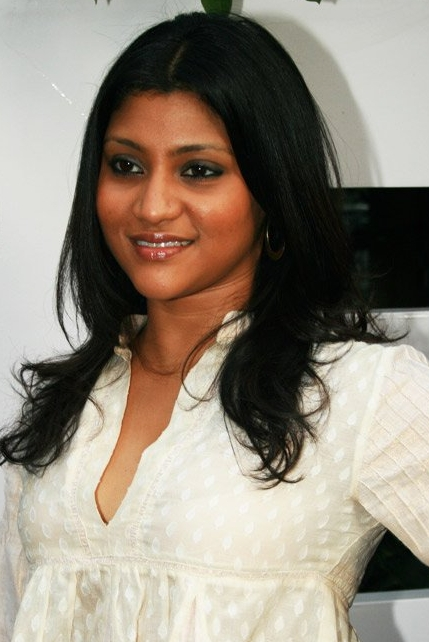
Sen Sharma at an event in 2007

She began 2007 by portraying a street prostitute in the noir film Traffic Signal which marked her second collaboration with Bhandarkar. Her performance, like the film, earned positive reviews; however, it emerged as a commercial failure at the box-office. She next starred alongside an ensemble cast including Shilpa Shetty, Kay Kay Menon, Irrfan Khan and Kangana Ranaut in Anurag Basu's urban drama Life in a... Metro. The film depicted the lives of nine different individuals in Mumbai, and dealt with heresy such as extramarital affairs, sanctity of marriage, commitment phobia and love. It opened to widespread critical acclaim, with Sen Sharma's performance as a young and insecure woman receiving high praise. Despite expectations, the film emerged as a surprise commercial success at the box-office, grossing over ₹250 million worldwide. Life in a... Metro earned her a second consecutive Filmfare Award for Best Supporting Actress.

In the latter half of 2007, Sen Sharma starred in two films under the Yash Raj Films banner – the women-centric drama Laaga Chunari Mein Daag and the musical drama Aaja Nachle. She noted her excitement toward these two projects as these were the first films in which she had to lip sync for songs. Pradeep Sarkar's Laaga Chunari Mein Daag saw her star alongside an ensemble cast of Jaya Bachchan, Rani Mukerji, Anupam Kher, Kunal Kapoor and Abhishek Bachchan. The film tackled heresy of duty, sacrifice and morality. She portrayed the role of a young girl who moves to Mumbai only to find her older sister moonlighting as an escort unbeknownst to her family, and helps her sister redeem herself. It opened to mixed reviews from critics upon release, however Sen Sharma's performance received praise, thus earning a third nomination for the Filmfare Award for Best Supporting Actress. Anil Mehta's Aaja Nachle, which marked the comeback of Madhuri Dixit, saw Sen Sharma in the supporting role of a tomboy. The film received mixed-to-negative reviews, but praise was directed to her performance, with Rajeev Masand from CNN-IBN noting her performance in the film as being "...nothing short of fantastic. Her greatest strength is that she isn't afraid of making a fool of herself and she doesn't worry about being laughed at. As a result, her performance in Aaja Nachle is fearless and uninhibited." Laaga Chunari Mein Daag emerged as a below-average grosser, while Aaja Nachle emerged as a commercial failure at the box-office.

In 2008, she starred in the critically and commercially unsuccessful romantic comedy Dil Kabaddi. She next appeared in a short film (How Can It Be?) directed by Mira Nair for a film project called 8, which was screened at several film festivals in 2008 before having a theatrical release.

In 2009, her first film appearance was in the low-budget English-language film The President Is Coming, directed by Kunaal Roy Kapur. The film explores a day in the life of six contestants who will stop at nothing as the US President is coming to town, with Sen Sharma playing one of the six contestants who will represent New India in front of the President. It received positive reviews from critics upon release, with particular praise for Sen Sharma's performance. Nikhat Kazmi from The Times of India wrote, "Performance-wise, it's the uptight and complex-ridden Sen Sharma who walks away with laurels and laughs even as the film takes a healthy snigger at the desi self."

Sen Sharma next starred in Zoya Akhtar's directorial debut, the drama Luck by Chance, leading an ensemble cast alongside Farhan Akhtar. The film saw her portray a starlet trying to make it big in the Hindi film industry. It opened to widespread critical acclaim upon release, with high praise directed towards Sen Sharma's performance; however, the film emerged as an underwhelming success at the box-office. She followed the film up with Ayan Mukerji's directorial debut, the coming-of-age comedy-drama Wake Up Sid opposite Ranbir Kapoor. The film told the story of a careless rich college brat who is taught the value of owning up to responsibility by an aspiring writer from Kolkata, the latter portrayed by Sen Sharma. It received widespread critical acclaim upon release, with high praise directed towards her performance. Taran Adarsh of Bollywood Hungama wrote, "Sen Sharma is natural to the core and the best part is, she's so effortless. Here's another winning performance from this incredible performer!" The New York Times wrote, "Ms. Sen Sharma has made a specialty of characters like Aisha: independent urban women, whose dreams involve careers as well as love. Her Aisha is a nuanced creation — ambitious, sympathetic, believable — and Mr. Mukerji, making his directing debut, is right to let her run away with the film." The film emerged as a commercial success at the box-office, grossing ₹471 million worldwide.

In June 2009, Sen Sharma starred onstage first time at Atul Kumar's The Blue Mug alongside Rajat Kapoor, Vinay Pathak, Ranvir Shorey and Sheeba Chadha. In 2010, the play was toured around the nation and abroad. In 2010, Sen Sharma starred as a working woman in Ashwani Dheer's comedy Atithi Tum Kab Jaoge alongside Ajay Devgan and Paresh Rawal. and as a lawyer in Neeraj Pathak's Right Yaa Wrong. The former emerged as a critical and commercial success, while the latter emerged as a disaster critically and commercially. The same year, she finished shooting for Rituparno Ghosh's unreleased comedy Sunglass and Vinay Shukla's comedy-drama Mirch, a critical and commercial failure.

=== Continued work (2011–2016) ===
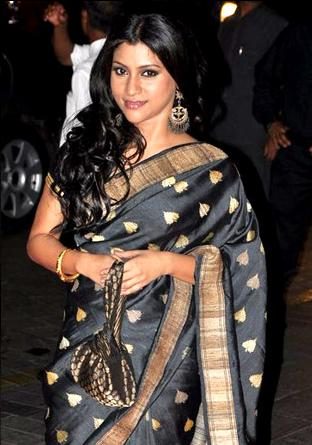
Sen Sharma at Karan Johar's birthday party in 2012.

Sen Sharma began 2011 with a special appearance in Vishal Bhardwaj's black comedy 7 Khoon Maaf alongside Priyanka Chopra and Vivaan Shah. She then played the leading role in Aparna Sen's drama Iti Mrinalini, reportedly a semi-autobiographical film directed by the acclaimed Indian director Aparna Sen, also her mother. She next appeared in Amitabh Verma's Jackpot opposite Ranvir Shorey, in Suman Mukherjee's adaptation of Shesher Kobita and Goutam Ghose's Shunyo Awnko.

In 2013, she appeared alongside Emraan Hashmi, Kalki Koechlin and Huma Qureshi in Balaji Telefilms' supernatural thriller Ek Thi Daayan, directed by newcomer Kannan Iyer and produced by Vishal Bhardwaj and Ekta Kapoor. The film itself is inspired by the short story written by her father Mukul Sharma. It opened to positive reviews from critics upon release, with Sen Sharma's performance receiving high praise in particular, earning her a fourth nomination for the Filmfare Award for Best Supporting Actress. The film emerged as a moderate commercial success at the box-office. She also starred in Aparna Sen's horror comedy Goynar Baksho which earned her critical acclaim and won her the Filmfare Award Bangla for Best Actress.

In 2015, Sen Sharma starred in the Bengali film Kadambari as Kadambari Devi, Tagore's sister-in-law and also portrayed Lakshmi Das, the wife of Gour Hari Das, an Odisha freedom fighter who spent 32 years attempting to convince the government of his patriotism in the biographical film Gour Hari Dastaan. The same year, she played a character based on Nupur Talwar in Meghna Gulzar's thriller drama Talvar, based on the 2008 Noida double murder case. The film premiered at the 2015 Toronto International Film Festival to widespread critical acclaim with high praise directed towards her performance; moreover, the film also emerged as a sleeper hit at the box-office. In the same year she played Nayantara in a short film, Nayantara's Necklace.

In 2016, Sharma portrayed a cop in AR Murugadoss' action thriller Akira, alongside Sonakshi Sinha, which received mixed reviews from critics, and emerged as a commercial failure at the box-office.

=== Directorial debut and streaming projects (2017–present) ===
Sen Sharma ventured into film direction with the English-language drama A Death in the Gunj, which starred an ensemble cast including Vikrant Massey and Kalki Koechlin. The film premiered at the 2016 Toronto International Film Festival and received widespread critical acclaim upon its theatrical release in 2017. It won her the Filmfare Award for Best Debut Director and a nomination for the Filmfare Award for Best Film (Critics). Additionally, she also won the Best Director award at the New York Indian Film Festival and the MAMI Film Festival. The same year, she also starred in the ensemble black comedy-drama Lipstick Under My Burkha directed by Alankrita Shrivastava. Revolving around the secret lives of four women who are in search of her freedom, the film received critical acclaim upon release, and won her the Best Actress award at the New York Indian Film Festival and the Indian Film Festival of Melbourne. However, despite critical acclaim, both A Death in the Gunj and Lipstick Under My Burkha emerged as below-average commercial successes at the box-office.

In 2020, she starred in the comedy-drama Dolly Kitty Aur Woh Chamakte Sitare alongside Bhumi Pednekar as a middle-class woman struggling with societal expectations. It released on Netflix to mixed reviews, but earned her (and Pednekar) a nomination for the Filmfare Award for Best Actress (Critics). Her next project, titled Scholarship, alongside Kalki Koechlin is in pre-production.

In 2021, her first film appearance was as a woman who loses her father in Seema Pahwa's directorial debut, the ensemble family comedy-drama Ramprasad Ki Tehrvi. The film opened to critical acclaim, and earned her a fifth nomination for the Filmfare Award for Best Supporting Actress. However, the film emerged as a commercial failure at the box-office. She followed it up with her portrayal of a lower-caste androgynous woman who develops feelings for her colleague in Neeraj Ghaywan's Geeli Pucchi, a segment of the Netflix anthology film Ajeeb Daastaans. Her performance earned her high critical acclaim and won her the Filmfare OTT Award for Best Actress in a Web Original Film, and the Best Actress in a Leading Role award at the Asian Academy Creative Awards Grand Finals. She next appeared as the Social Services Director of a general hospital in the Amazon Prime medical drama web series Mumbai Diaries 26/11. Directed by Nikkhil Advani, the series was set in the emergency room of a government hospital, focusing on the challenges faced by medical staff and first responders during the 2008 Mumbai attacks. The series, and Sen Sharma's performance, received critical acclaim upon release.

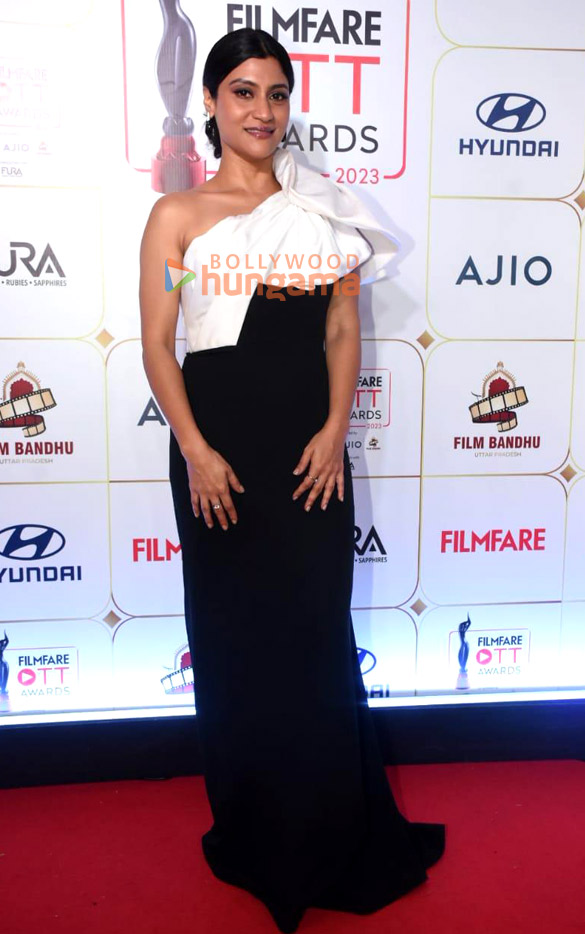
Sen Sharma at the 2023 Filmfare OTT Awards ceremony.

In 2023, her first film appearance was as a hardened cop in the action thriller Kuttey, which received mixed-to-negative reviews from critics upon release, and emerged as a commercial disaster at the box-office. she next collaborated as a director with R. Balki, Amit Ravindernath Sharma and Sujoy Ghosh for the Netflix anthology film Lust Stories 2. Her segment titled "The Mirror", which starred Tillotama Shome and Amruta Subhash, tackled heresy of female desire and voyeurism. It received positive reviews upon release, with high praise for Sen Sharma's segment, winning her the Filmfare OTT Award for Best Web Original Film (Critics).

She later reprised her role of Dr. Chitra Das in the second season of the Mumbai Diaries that focused on 2005 Mumbai floods. She was given more screen time this season, and her performance stood out as she depicted a vulnerable woman grappling with her inner demons, especially in moments with her ex-husband, played by Parambrata Chattopadhyay. Season 2 review of The Hindu described her performance as "by turns steely and tremulous in an affecting role," highlighting how she navigated the challenging emotional terrain of a healthcare worker during a crisis.

In January 2024, Sen Sharma appeared in the black comedy crime thriller series Killer Soup, on Netflix. She played the lead role alongside Manoj Bajpayee and received good reviews for her performance.

In 2025, Sen Sharma starred in Anurag Basu's Metro... In Dino alongside an ensemble cast of Anupam Kher, Neena Gupta, Pankaj Tripathi, Aditya Roy Kapur, Sara Ali Khan, Ali Fazal and Fatima Sana Shaikh. The film is a spiritual successor of Life in a... Metro (2007), with her being the only actor from the original to also star in the second part, albeit in a different role. She will star alongside Ronit Roy in Preetam Mukherjee's mystery film Bioscope.

== Media image ==
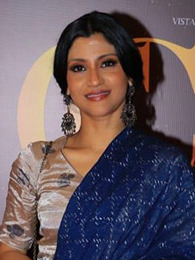
Sen Sharma in 2019

Sen Sharma is considered as one of the most popular actresses of 2000's in Hindi cinema. In 2022, she was placed in Outlook India's "75 Best Bollywood Actresses" list. In Rediff.com's "Best Bollywood Actresses", Sen Sharma was placed 4th in 2002, 11th in 2006, 2nd in 2020 and 1st in 2021. For her performance in Mr. & Mrs. Iyer, Sen Sharma was placed in Rediff.com's "Best Bollywood Debut Ever" list.

== Personal life ==
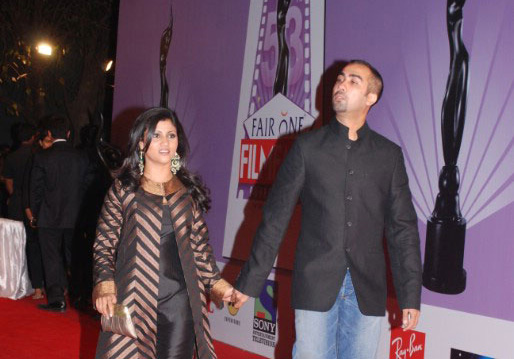
Konkona Sharma her ex-husband Ranvir Shorey in 2008.

Sen Sharma started dating actor and co-star Ranvir Shorey in 2007. The couple got married on 3 September 2010 in a private ceremony. The Times of India reported that Sen Sharma gave birth to her first child, Haroon Shorey, on 15 March 2011 at a South Mumbai hospital.

Sen Sharma and Shorey announced her separation in September 2015. They still remain cordial and share the custody of her son. The couple finally got divorced on 13 August 2020.

In March 2022, Sen Sharma identified as gender-neutral, stating: "I don't view myself as a woman. I see myself as being completely neutral. Gender is a taught concept that I don't relate to." She has described herself as an atheist.

In 2025, media speculated about Sen Sharma's relationship with actor Amol Parashar, though she did not comment publicly on the rumours.

== Podcasts and audioboosk ==
| Year | Title | Author | Role | Language | Notes |
|---|---|---|---|---|---|
| 2019 | Twin Beds | Anita Nair | Nisha (wife) | English | with Satyadeep Mishra |
| 2019 | The Rumour | Anushka Ravishankar | Narrator | English | |
| 2019 | The Last Bargain | Samita Aiyer | Narrator | English | |
| 2020 | A Swiss Mountain Adventure | | Narrator | English | Mindhouse App |
| 2020 | The Timeless Love of Lily Moon | | Narrator | English | Mindhouse App |
| 2021 | Kadambari Devi's Suicide Note | Ranjan Bandopadhyay | Narrator | English | Translated from Bengali by Jhimli Mookherjee |
| 2022 | Barefoot Boys | | Podcaster | English | Podcast |

== Discography ==
| Year | Track | Album | Record label | Language | Notes |
|---|---|---|---|---|---|
| 2013 | "Bangla Rap" | Goynar Baksho | SVF | Bengali | with Paran Bandopadhyay, Pijush Ganguly & Moushumi Chatterjee |
| 2015 | "The Broken Heart (Bhogno Hridoy)" | Kadambari | Times Music | Bengali | with Saskia Rao De Haas, Sandipan Ganguly & Parambrata Chattopadhyay |
| 2015 | "Kadambori's Letter" | Kadambari | Times Music | Bengali | |

== Awards and nominations ==
=== Filmfare Awards ===
| Year | Film | Award | Category | Result | Ref. |
|---|---|---|---|---|---|
| 2007 | Omkara | Filmfare Awards | Best Supporting Actress | Won | |
| 2008 | Life in a... Metro | Filmfare Awards | Best Supporting Actress | Won | |
| 2008 | Laaga Chunari Mein Daag | Filmfare Awards | Best Supporting Actress | Nominated | |
| 2014 | Ek Thi Daayan | Filmfare Awards | Best Supporting Actress | Nominated | |
| 2018 | A Death in the Gunj | Filmfare Awards | Best Film (Critics) | Nominated | |
| 2018 | A Death in the Gunj | Filmfare Awards | Best Debut Director | Won | |
| 2021 | Dolly Kitty Aur Woh Chamakte Sitare | Filmfare Awards | Best Actress (Critics) | Nominated | |
| 2022 | Ramprasad Ki Tehrvi | Filmfare Awards | Best Supporting Actress | Nominated | |

=== Filmfare OTT Awards ===
| Year | Film | Award | Category | Result | Ref. |
|---|---|---|---|---|---|
| 2021 | Ajeeb Daastaans | Filmfare OTT Awards | Best Actress in a Web Original Film | Won | |
| 2023 | Lust Stories 2 | Filmfare OTT Awards | Best Web Original Film (Critics) | Won | |
| 2024 | Mumbai Diaries (Season 2) | filmfare OTT Awards | Best Actor Female Drama Series | Nominated | |

=== National Film Awards ===
| Year | Film | Award | Category | Result | Ref. |
|---|---|---|---|---|---|
| 2003 | Mr. and Mrs. Iyer | National Film Awards | Best Actress | Won | |
| 2007 | Omkara | National Film Awards | Best Supporting Actress | Won | |

=== Other awards ===
| Year | Film | Award | Category | Result | Ref. |
|---|---|---|---|---|---|
| 2002 | Ek Je Aachhe Kanya | Bengal Film Journalists' Association Awards | Best Actress | Won | |
| 2003 | Mr. and Mrs. Iyer | Anandalok Awards | Best Actress (Critics) | Won | |
| 2006 | Page 3 | Zee Cine Awards | Best Female Debut (jointly with Vidya Balan) | Won | |
| 2006 | Page 3 | International Indian Film Academy Awards | Best Actress | Nominated | |
| 2006 | Page 3 | Producers Guild Film Awards | Best Supporting Actress | Nominated | |
| 2006 | Page 3 | Screen Awards | Best Actress | Nominated | |
| 2007 | Omkara | Bollywood Movie Awards | Best Supporting Actress | Nominated | |
| 2007 | Omkara | Zee Cine Awards | Best Supporting Actress | Won | |
| 2007 | Omkara | International Indian Film Academy Awards | Best Supporting Actress | Nominated | |
| 2007 | Omkara | Screen Awards | Best Supporting Actress | Nominated | |
| 2007 | 15 Park Avenue | Bengal Film Journalists' Association Awards | Most Outstanding Performance of the Year | Won | |
| 2007 | Dosar | New York Indian Film Festival | Best Actress | Won | |
| 2008 | Life in a... Metro | International Indian Film Academy Awards | Best Supporting Actress | Won | |
| 2008 | Life in a... Metro | Producers Guild Film Awards | Best Supporting Actress | Won | |
| 2008 | Life in a... Metro | Screen Awards | Best Supporting Actress | Nominated | |
| 2008 | Life in a... Metro | Zee Cine Awards | Best Supporting Actress | Nominated | |
| 2010 | Wake Up Sid | Producers Guild Film Awards | Best Actress | Nominated | |
| 2011 | Iti Mrinalini | New York Indian Film Festival | Best Actress | Won | |
| 2014 | Ek Thi Daayan | Screen Awards | Best Actor in a Negative Role (Female) | Nominated | |
| 2014 | Goynar Baksho | Filmfare Awards Bangla | Best Actress | Won | |
| 2016 | Talvar | International Indian Film Academy Awards | Best Supporting Actress | Nominated | |
| 2016 | Talvar | Producers Guild Film Awards | Best Supporting Actress | Nominated | |
| 2016 | Talvar | Zee Cine Awards | Best Supporting Actress | Nominated | |
| 2016 | Talvar | BIG Star Entertainment Awards | Most Entertaining Actor in a Thriller Role – Female | Nominated | |
| 2018 | —N/a | GQ India Awards | Excellence in Direction and Acting | Won | |
| 2018 | A Death in the Gunj | | | | |
| 2018 | A Death in the Gunj | International Indian Film Academy Awards | Best Debut Director | Won | |
| 2018 | A Death in the Gunj | Gollapudi Srinivas Awards | Best Debut Director | Won | |
| 2018 | A Death in the Gunj | MAMI Film Festival | Mastercard Best Indian Filmmaker (Female) | Won | |
| 2018 | A Death in the Gunj | Indian Film Festival of Melbourne | Best Director | Nominated | |
| 2018 | A Death in the Gunj | New York Indian Film Festival | Best Director | Won | |
| 2018 | Lipstick Under My Burkha | New York Indian Film Festival | Best Feature Film | Nominated | |
| 2018 | Lipstick Under My Burkha | New York Indian Film Festival | Best Actress | Won | |
| 2018 | Lipstick Under My Burkha | Indian Film Festival of Melbourne | Best Actress | Won | |
| 2018 | Lipstick Under My Burkha | Screen Awards | Best Actress (Critics) | Won | |
| 2018 | Lipstick Under My Burkha | Zee Cine Awards | Best Supporting Actress | Nominated | |
| 2021 | Ajeeb Daastaans | Asian Academy Creative Awards | Best Actress in a Leading Role | Won | |

== See also ==
- List of Indian film actresses
- List of Bengali actresses
