= 55th Filmfare Awards =

2010 awards for Hindi cinema

- Date: 27 February 2010
- Site: Yash Raj Studios, Mumbai
- Hosted by: Shahrukh Khan; Saif Ali Khan; Shruti Haasan; Karan Johar; Siddharth
- Official website: www.filmfare.com

Highlights
- Best Film: 3 Idiots
- Critics Award for Best Film: Firaaq
- Most awards: 3 Idiots & Dev.D (6)
- Most nominations: Love Aaj Kal (12)

Television coverage
- Network: Sony Entertainment Television (India)

The 55th Filmfare Awards were held on 27 February 2010 at the Yash Raj Studios in Mumbai, India. The awards were given in 30 categories, out of which there were 3 special awards, 3 critics awards and 24 main awards for Hindi films released in 2009. There were 60 nominations for the top 10 categories, which were based on votes via web and newspaper forms. The award ceremony was hosted by Shahrukh Khan and Saif Ali Khan.

Love Aaj Kal led the ceremony with 12 nominations, followed by 3 Idiots with 11 nominations and Kaminey with 10 nominations.

3 Idiots and Dev.D won 6 awards each, thus becoming the most-awarded films at the ceremony, with the former winning Best Film, Best Director (for Rajkumar Hirani) and Best Supporting Actor (for Boman Irani), and the latter winning Best Actress (Critics) (for Mahie Gill) and Best Supporting Actress (for Kalki Koechlin).

Paa fetched Amitabh Bachchan his fifth Best Actor award, and Vidya Balan her first ever Best Actress award, for their performance as the son-mother duo of Auro and Vidya.

Kareena Kapoor received dual nominations for Best Actress for her performances in 3 Idiots and Kurbaan, but lost to Vidya Balan who won the award for Paa.

== Awards and nominees ==
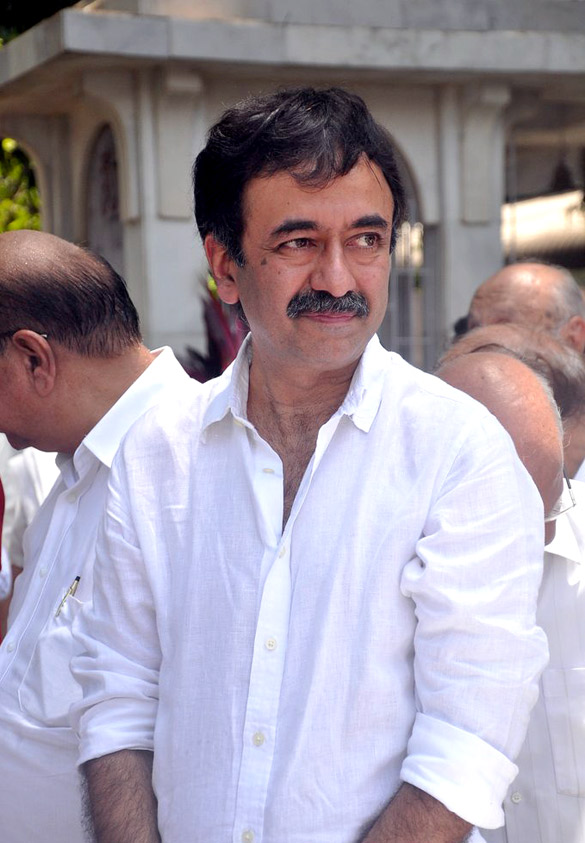
Rajkumar Hirani, Best Director

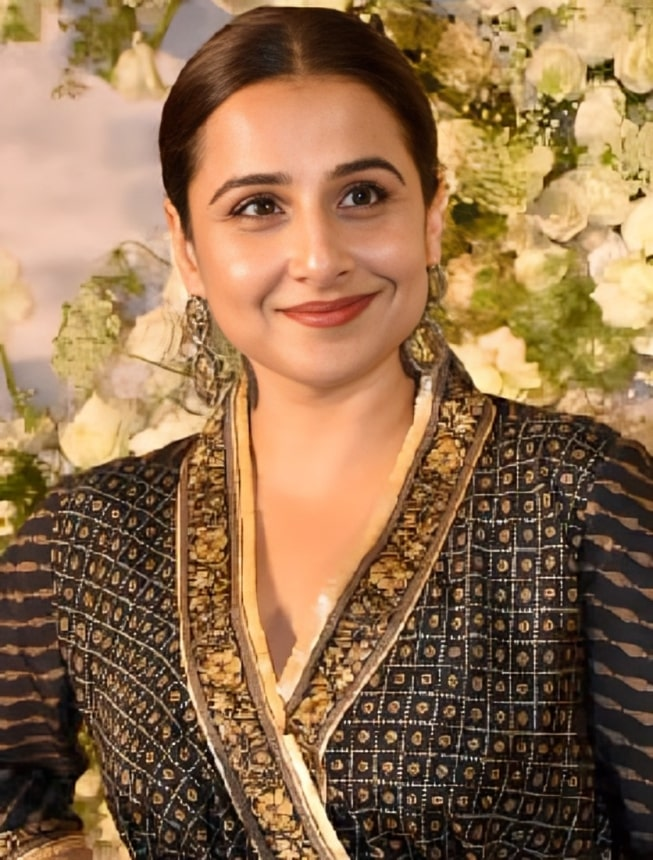
Vidya Balan, Best Actress

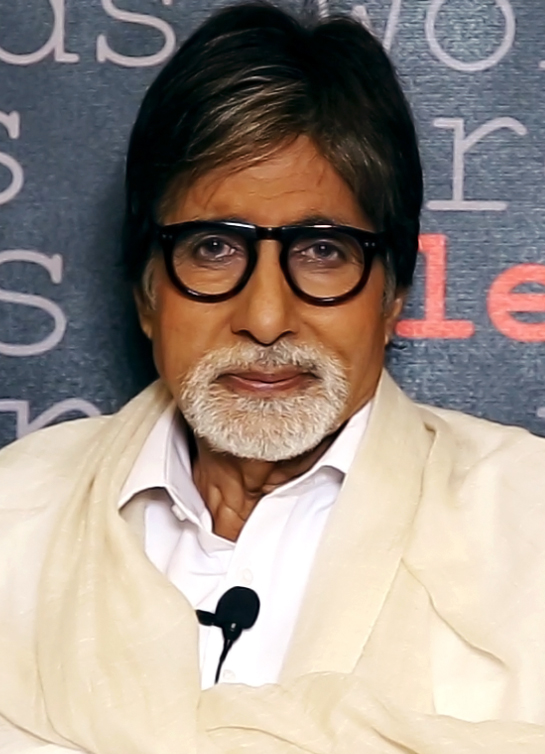
Amitabh Bachchan, Best Actor

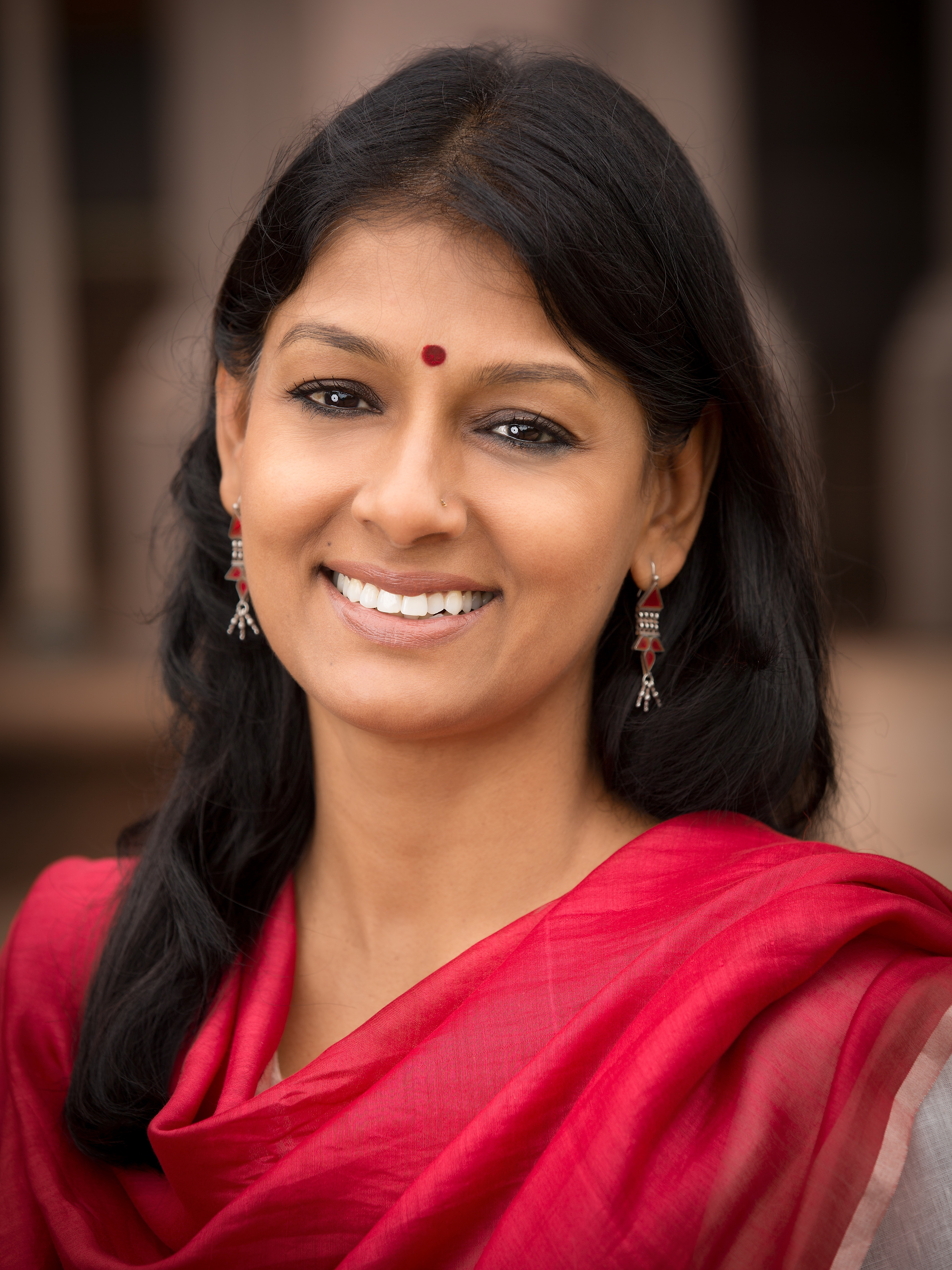
Nandita Das, Best Director Critics

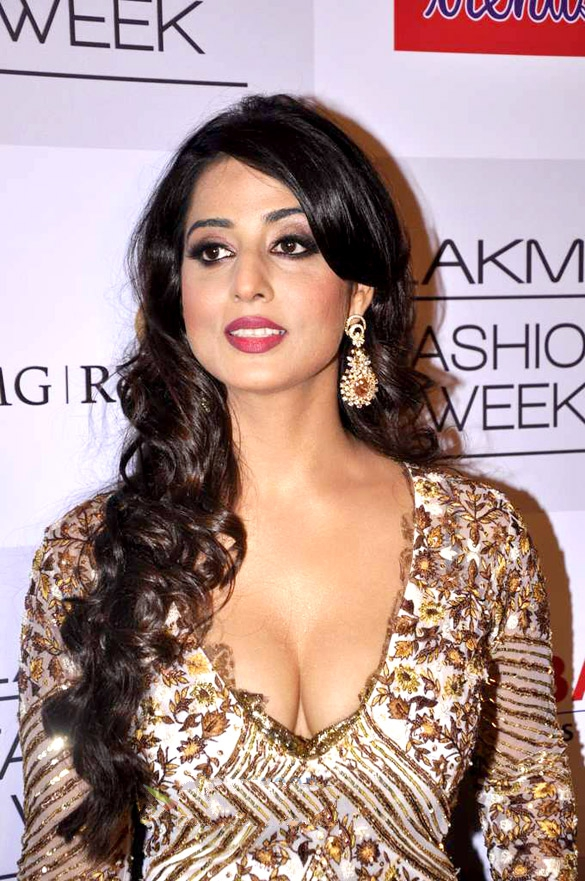
Mahi Gill, Best Actress Critics

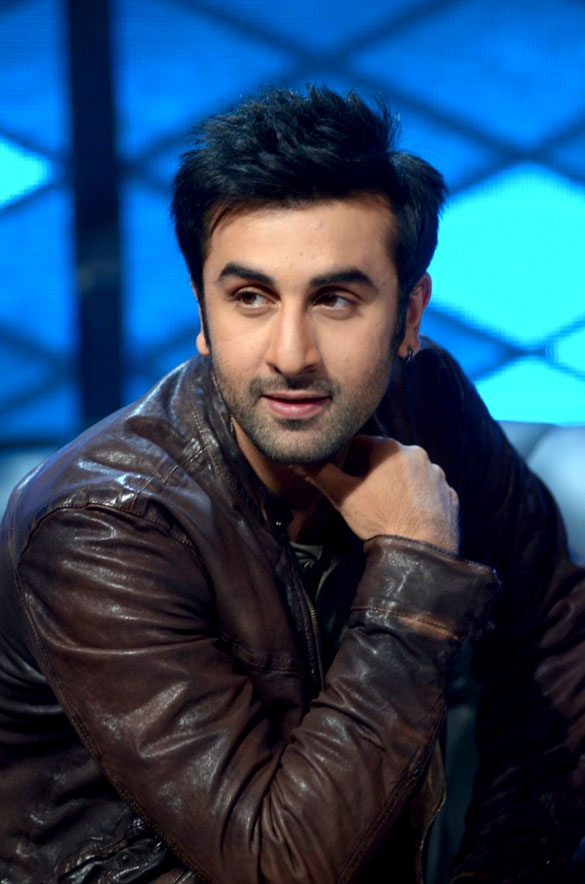
Ranbir Kapoor, Best Actor Critics

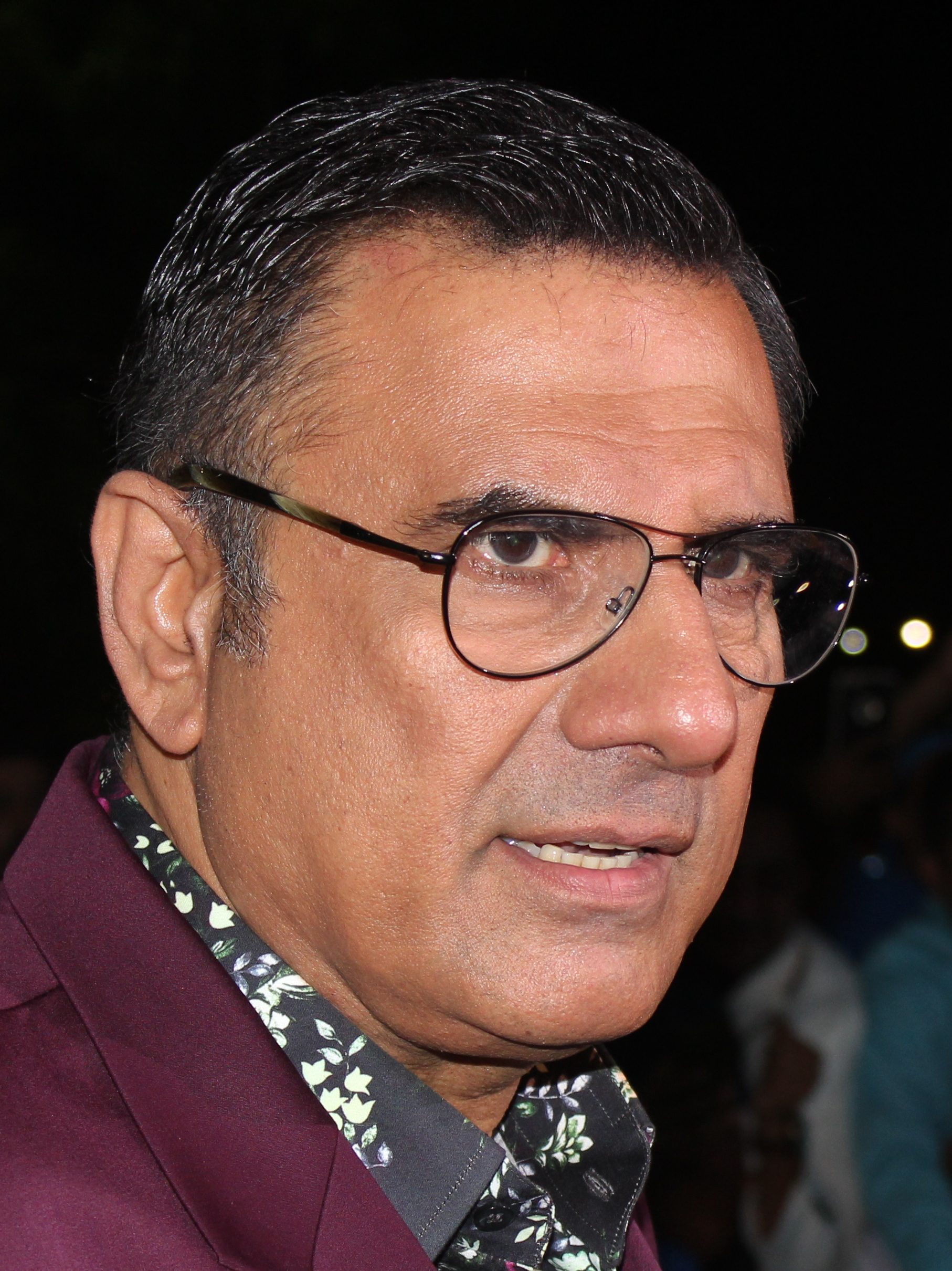
Boman Irani, Best Supporting Actor

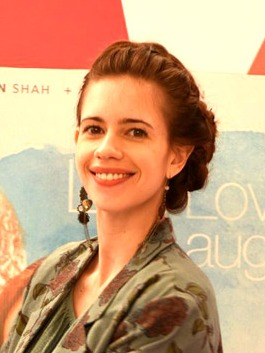
Kalki Koechlin, Best Supporting Actress

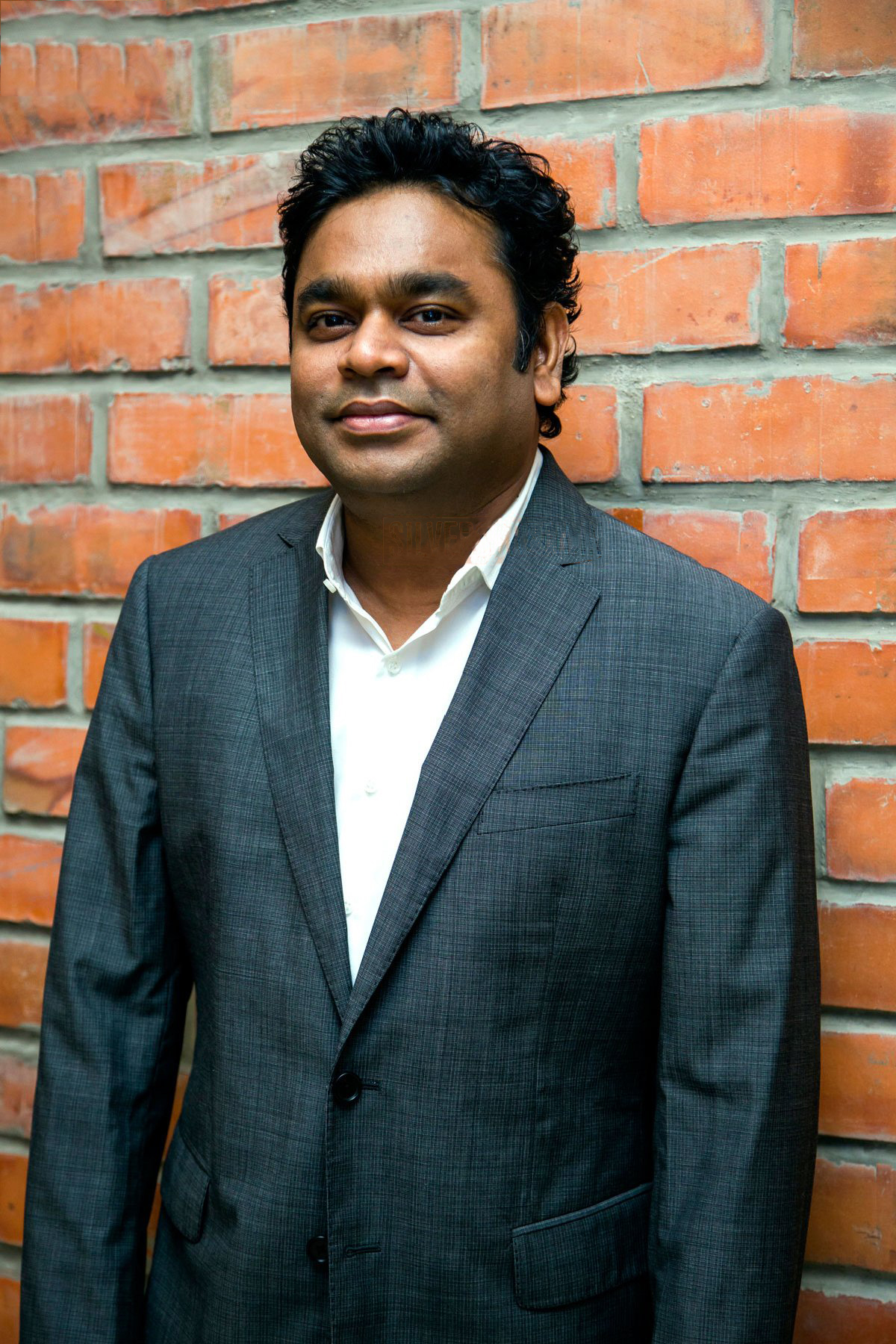
A. R. Rahman, Best Music Director

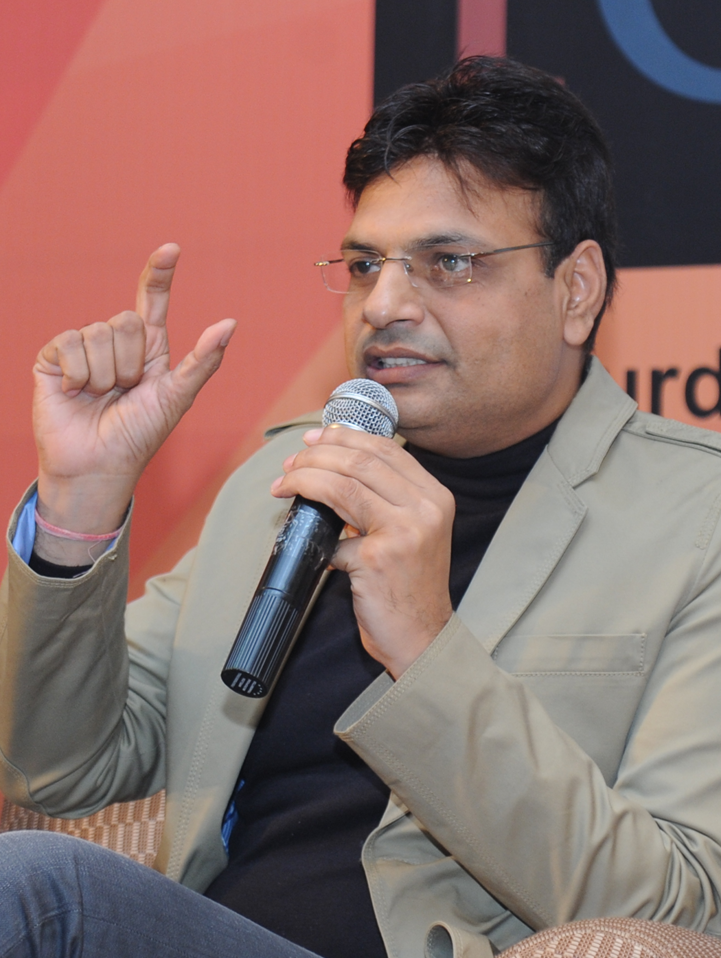
Irshad Kamil, Best Lyricist

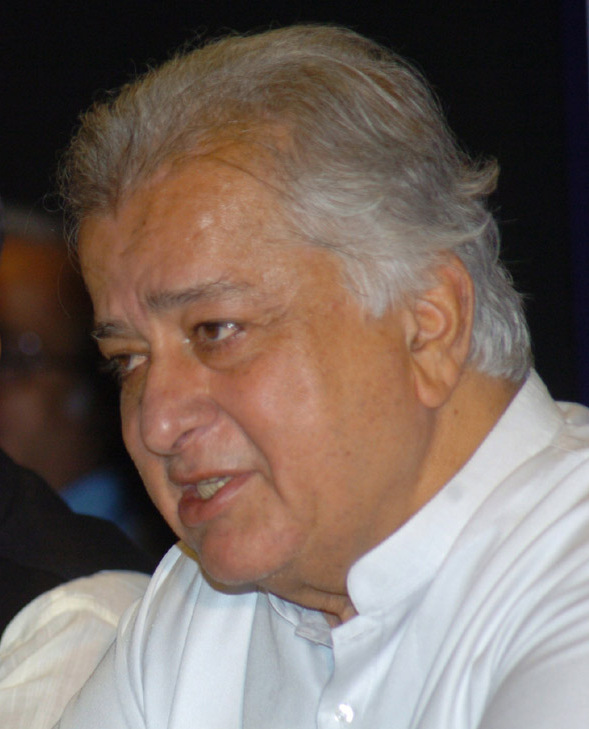
Shashi Kapoor, Lifetime Achievement Awardee

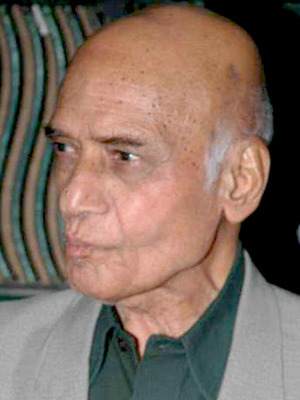
Mohammed Zahur Khayyam, Lifetime Achievement Awardee

=== Main awards ===
Best Film	Best Director
3 Idiots; Dev.D; Kaminey; Love Aaj Kal; Paa; Wake Up Sid	Rajkumar Hirani – 3 Idiots; Anurag Kashyap – Dev.D; Ayan Mukerji – Wake Up Sid; Imtiaz Ali – Love Aaj Kal; R. Balki – Paa; Vishal Bhardwaj – Kaminey
Best Actor	Best Actress
Amitabh Bachchan – Paa as Auro; Aamir Khan – 3 Idiots as Rancho; Ranbir Kapoor – Ajab Prem Ki Ghazab Kahani as Prem Shankar Sharma / Statue; Ranbir Kapoor – Wake Up Sid as Siddharth Mehra; Saif Ali Khan – Love Aaj Kal as Jaivardhan Singh; Shahid Kapoor – Kaminey as Charlie / Guddu Sharma	Vidya Balan – Paa as Vidya; Deepika Padukone – Love Aaj Kal as Meera Pandit; Kareena Kapoor – 3 Idiots as Pia Sahastrabuddhe; Kareena Kapoor – Kurbaan as Avantika Ahuja; Katrina Kaif – New York as Maya Shaikh; Priyanka Chopra – Kaminey as Sweety Shekhar Bhope
Best Supporting Actor	Best Supporting Actress
Boman Irani – 3 Idiots as Dr. Viru Sahastrabuddhe; Amole Gupte – Kaminey as Sunil Shekhar Bhope 'Bhope Bhau'; Neil Nitin Mukesh – New York as Omar Aijaz; R. Madhavan – 3 Idiots as Farhan Qureshi; Rishi Kapoor – Luck by Chance as Rommy Rolly; Sharman Joshi – 3 Idiots as Raju Rastogi	Kalki Koechlin – Dev.D as Leni / Chandramukhi 'Chanda'; Arundhati Nag – Paa as Pallavi; Dimple Kapadia – Luck By Chance as Neena Walia; Divya Dutta – Delhi-6 as Jalebi; Shahana Goswami – Firaaq as Muneera; Supriya Pathak – Wake Up Sid as Sarita Mehra
Best Music Director	Best Lyricist
A. R. Rahman – Delhi-6; Amit Trivedi – Dev.D; Pritam – Ajab Prem Ki Ghazab Kahani; Pritam – Love Aaj Kal; Shankar–Ehsaan–Loy – Wake Up Sid; Vishal Bhardwaj – Kaminey	Irshad Kamil – "Aaj Din Chadheya" from Love Aaj Kal; Gulzar – "Dhan Te Nan" from Kaminey; Gulzar – "Kaminey" from Kaminey; Javed Akhtar – "Iktara" from Wake Up Sid; Prasoon Joshi – "Masakali" from Delhi-6; Prasoon Joshi – "Rehna Tu" from Delhi-6
Best Playback Singer – Male	Best Playback Singer – Female
Mohit Chauhan – "Masakali" from Delhi-6; Atif Aslam – "Tu Jaane Na" from Ajab Prem Ki Ghazab Kahani; Javed Ali and Kailash Kher – "Arziyan" from Delhi-6; Rahat Fateh Ali Khan – "Aaj Din Chadheya" from Love Aaj Kal; Sonu Nigam and Salim Merchant – "Shukran Allah" from Kurbaan; Sukhwinder Singh and Vishal Dadlani – "Dhan Te Nan" from Kaminey	Rekha Bhardwaj – "Genda Phool" from Delhi-6 (tie); Kavita Seth – "Iktara" from Wake Up Sid; Alisha Chinai – "Tera Hone Laga" from Ajab Prem Ki Ghazab Kahani; Shilpa Rao – "Mudi Mudi" from Paa; Shreya Ghoshal – "Zoobi Doobi" from 3 Idiots; Sunidhi Chauhan – "Chor Bazaari" from Love Aaj Kal

=== Critics' awards ===
Best Film
Firaaq (Nandita Das)
Best Actor	Best Actress
Ranbir Kapoor – Wake Up Sid, Ajab Prem Ki Ghazab Kahani, Rocket Singh: Salesman of the Year	Mahi Gill – Dev.D

=== Technical awards ===
Best Story	Best Screenplay
Abhijat Joshi, Rajkumar Hirani – 3 Idiots; Anurag Kashyap, Aparna Malhotra, Raj Singh Chaudhary, Sanjay Maurya – Gulaal; Imtiaz Ali – Love Aaj Kal; Jaideep Sahni – Rocket Singh: Salesman of the Year; Zoya Akhtar – Luck By Chance	Rajkumar Hirani, Vidhu Vinod Chopra, Abhijat Joshi – 3 Idiots; Imtiaz Ali – Love Aaj Kal; Pankaj Advani – Sankat City; R. Balki – Paa; Zoya Akhtar – Luck By Chance
Best Dialogue	Best Editing
Abhijat Joshi, Rajkumar Hirani – 3 Idiots; Anurag Kashyap – Gulaal; Imtiaz Ali – Love Aaj Kal; Jaideep Sahni – Rocket Singh: Salesman of the Year; Nandita Das, Shuchi Kothari – Firaaq	Sreekar Prasad – Firaaq
Best Choreography	Best Cinematography
Bosco-Caesar – "Chor Bazaari" from Love Aaj Kal	Rajeev Ravi – Dev.D
Best Production Design	Best Sound Design
Helen Jones, Sukanta Panigrahi – Dev.D	Manas Choudhary – Firaaq
Best Costume Design	Best Background Score
Vaishali Menon – Firaaq	Amit Trivedi – Dev.D
Best Special Effects	Best Action
Govardhan Vigharan, Vinay Singh Chuphal – Kaminey	Vijayan Master – Wanted

=== Special awards ===
Lifetime Achievement
Shashi Kapoor	Mohammed Zahur Khayyam
Best Debut Director
Male	Female
Ayan Mukerji – Wake Up Sid	Zoya Akhtar – Luck By Chance
RD Burman Award
Amit Trivedi – Dev.D
Special Award
Nandita Das – Firaaq

== See also ==
- Bollywood
