= Producers Guild Film Award for Best Actress in a Leading Role =

Annual Indian film award

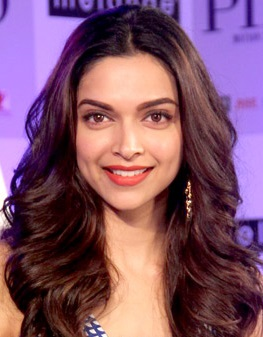
- 2016 Recipient Deepika Padukone
- Awarded for: Best Performance by an Actress in a Leading Role
- Country: India
- Presented by: Film & Television Producers Guild
- First award: 2004 (for performances in films released around 2003)
- Final award: 2016 (for performances in films released around 2015)
- Currently held by: Deepika Padukone for Piku (2016)
- Website: Producers Guild Film Awards

The Producers Guild Film Award for Best Actress in a Leading Role (previously known as the Apsara Award for Best Actress in a Leading Role) is given by the producers of the film and television guild as part of its annual award ceremony for Hindi films, to recognise a female actor who has delivered an outstanding performance in a leading role. Following its inception in 2004, no one was awarded in 2005 and 2007.

† - indicates the performance also won the Filmfare Award
‡ - indicates the performance was also nominated for the Filmfare Award

== Superlatives ==
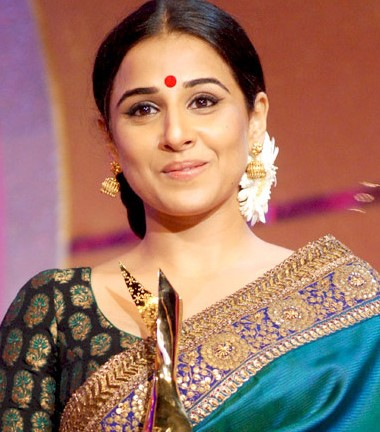
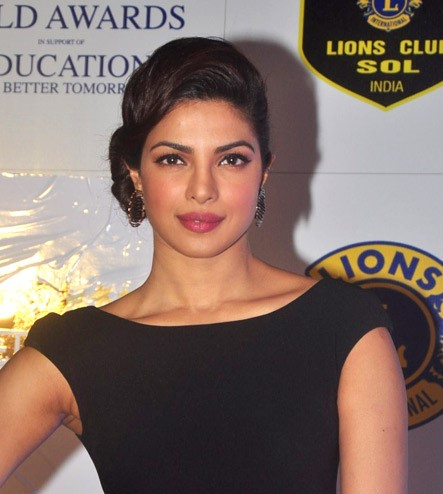
Vidya Balan (l) and Priyanka Chopra (r) hold the record for most awards in this category (3).

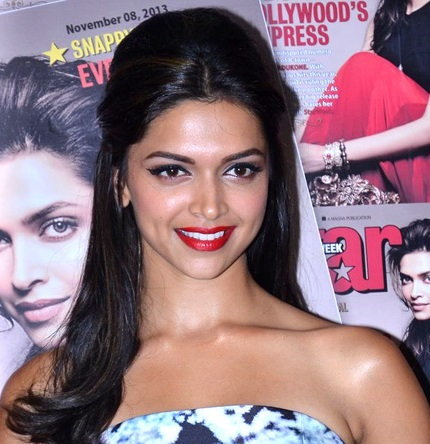
Deepika Padukone holds the record of maximum nominations (8).

Superlative	Actor	Record
Actress with most awards	Vidya Balan; Priyanka Chopra	3
Actress with most nominations	Deepika Padukone	8
Actress with most nominations without ever winning	Aishwarya Rai; Kangana Ranaut	3
Actress with most nominations in a single year	Deepika Padukone (2014)	3

Vidya Balan and Priyanka Chopra, with three wins each, have more Best Actress wins than any other actress. Followed by Deepika Padukone with two wins.

Two actresses have won the award in consecutive years; in chronological order, they are Priyanka Chopra (2009-10) and Vidya Balan (2011–13).

There has been only one tie in the history of this category. This occurred in 2011 when Anushka Sharma and Vidya Balan were both given the award.

Deepika Padukone, holds the record for most nominations in the Best Actress category, with 8, followed by Priyanka Chopra (7).

Deepika Padukone and Priyanka Chopra are the overall most-nominated performers in the female acting categories, with 8 nominations overall. Deepika having 8 for Best Actress, and Priyanka having 7 for Best Actress and 1 for Best Supporting Actress. Deepika Padukone also holds the record for most consecutive year nominations with 7 between 2013 and 2016, being nominated thrice in 2014 and twice in 2016.

Deepika Padukone who received three out of the six nominations of this category in 2014 (and eventually won for Chennai Express), holds the record for the highest number of Best Actress nominations in a single year.

Only once have two actresses been nominated for the same film: Deepika Padukone and Priyanka Chopra for Bajirao Mastani (2015)

Kangana Ranaut is the only actress to be nominated twice for the same role; she was nominated for her role as Tanuja "Tanu" Trivedi in 2012 and 2016

Only once have cousins been nominated for the Best Actress Award during the same year: Parineeti Chopra and Priyanka Chopra in 2013.

=== Multiple nominees ===
- 8 Nominations : Deepika Padukone
- 7 Nominations : Priyanka Chopra
- 5 Nominations : Rani Mukerji
- 4 Nominations : Vidya Balan, Kareena Kapoor
- 3 Nominations : Urmila Matondkar, Aishwarya Rai, Anushka Sharma, Kangana Ranaut
- 2 Nominations : Parineeti Chopra, Alia Bhatt

== Winners and nominees ==
Winners are listed first in bold, followed by the other nominees.

=== 2000s ===
Year	Actress	Film	Character
2004
2004	**Urmila Matondkar** ‡	**Bhoot**	**Swati**
2004	Bhoomika Chawla ‡	Tere Naam	Nirjala Bhardwaj
2004	Perizaad Zorabian	Joggers' Park	Jenny Suratwala
2004	Preity Zinta †	Kal Ho Naa Ho	Naina Catherine Kapur
2004	Urmila Matondkar	Pinjar	Puro/Hamida
2005	No award	--	--
2006
2006	**Rani Mukerji** †	**Black**	**Michelle McNally**
2006	Chitrangada Singh	Hazaaron Khwaishein Aisi	Geeta Rao
2006	Rani Mukerji †	Hum Tum	Rhea Prakash
2006	Urmila Matondkar	Maine Gandhi Ko Nahin Mara	Trisha Chaudhary
2006	Vidya Balan ‡	Parineeta	Lalita
2007	No award	--	--
2008
2008	**Kareena Kapoor** †	**Jab We Met**	**Geet Dhillon**
2008	Aishwarya Rai ‡	Guru	Sujata Desai
2008	Rani Mukerji ‡	Laaga Chunari Mein Daag	Vibhavari "Badki" S. Sahay
2008	Shilpa Shetty	Life in a... Metro	Shikha
2008	Tabu	Cheeni Kum	Nina Verma
2009
2009	**Priyanka Chopra** †	**Fashion**	**Meghna Mathur**
2009	Aishwarya Rai Bachchan ‡	Jodhaa Akbar	Rajkumari Jodhaa
2009	Bipasha Basu	Race	Sonia
2009	Genelia D'Souza	Jaane Tu... Ya Jaane Na	Aditi ('Meow')
2009	Soha Ali Khan	Khoya Khoya Chand	Nikhat

=== 2010s ===
Year	Actress	Film	Character
2010
2010	**Priyanka Chopra** ‡	**Kaminey**	**Sweety Shekhar Bhope**
2010	Asin ‡	Ghajini	Kalpana Shetty
2010	Deepika Padukone ‡	Love Aaj Kal	Meera Pandit
2010	Kareena Kapoor ‡	Kurbaan	Avantika Ahuja/Khan
2010	Konkona Sen Sharma	Wake Up Sid	Aisha Banerjee
2011
2011	**Anushka Sharma** ‡	**Band Baaja Baaraat**	**Shruti Kakkar**
2011	**Vidya Balan** ‡	**Ishqiya**	**Krishna Verma**
2011	Aishwarya Rai Bachchan ‡	Guzaarish	Sofia D'Souza
2011	Kajol †	My Name Is Khan	Mandira Khan
2011	Kareena Kapoor ‡	Golmaal 3	Daboo
2012
2012	**Vidya Balan** †	**The Dirty Picture**	**Reshma/Silk**
2012	Kangana Ranaut	Tanu Weds Manu	Tanuja "Tanu" Trivedi
2012	Katrina Kaif ‡	Mere Brother Ki Dulhan	Dimple Dixit
2012	Mahie Gill ‡	Saheb, Biwi Aur Gangster	Madhavi
2012	Priyanka Chopra ‡	7 Khoon Maaf	Susanna Anna-Marie Johannes
2012	Rani Mukerji † won Filmfare Award for Best Supporting Actress	No One Killed Jessica	Meera Gaity
2013
2013	**Vidya Balan** †	**Kahaani**	**Vidya Bagchi**
2013	Deepika Padukone ‡	Cocktail	Veronica Malaney
2013	Kareena Kapoor ‡	Heroine	Mahi Arora
2013	Parineeti Chopra ‡	Ishaqzaade	Zoya Qureshi
2013	Priyanka Chopra ‡	Barfi!	Jhilmil Chatterjee
2013	Sridevi ‡	English Vinglish	Shashi Godbole
2014
2014	**Deepika Padukone** ‡	**Chennai Express**	**Meenalochini Azhagusundaram**
2014	Deepika Padukone †	Goliyon Ki Raasleela Ram-Leela	Leela Sanera
2014	Deepika Padukone	Yeh Jawaani Hai Deewani	Naina Talwar
2014	Nimrat Kaur	The Lunchbox	Ila
2014	Parineeti Chopra ‡	Shuddh Desi Romance	Gayatri
2014	Sonakshi Sinha ‡	Lootera	Pakhi Roy Chaudhary
2015
2015	**Priyanka Chopra** ‡	**Mary Kom**	**Mary Kom**
2015	Alia Bhatt	2 States	Ananya Swaminathan
2015	Alia Bhatt ‡	Highway	Veera Tripathi
2015	Anushka Sharma	PK	Jagat Janini
2015	Deepika Padukone	Happy New Year	Mohini Joshi
2015	Kangana Ranaut †	Queen	Rani Mehra
2015	Rani Mukerji ‡	Mardaani	Shivani Shivaji Roy
2016
2016	**Deepika Padukone** †	**Piku**	**Piku Banerjee**
2016	Anushka Sharma ‡	NH10	Meera
2016	Deepika Padukone ‡	Bajirao Mastani	Mastani
2016	Kangana Ranaut ‡	Tanu Weds Manu Returns	Tanuja "Tanu" Trivedi / Kumari "Kusum" Sangwan (Datto)
2016	Priyanka Chopra † won Filmfare Award for Best Supporting Actress	Bajirao Mastani	Kashibai
2016	Priyanka Chopra	Dil Dhadakne Do	Ayesha Mehra/Sangha

== See also ==
- Producers Guild Film Awards
- Producers Guild Film Award for Best Actor in a Leading Role
