= 15 Park Avenue =

2005 Indian drama film

15, Park Avenue
- Directed by: Aparna Sen
- Written by: Aparna Sen
- Produced by: Bipin Vohra
- Starring: Shabana Azmi; Konkona Sen Sharma; Soumitra Chatterjee; Waheeda Rehman; Dhritiman Chatterjee; Rahul Bose; Kanwaljeet Singh
- Cinematography: Hemant Chaturvedi
- Edited by: Rabiranjan Maitra
- Release dates: 27 October 2005 (London); 6 January 2006 (India)
- Running time: 124 minutes
- Language: English

15 Park Avenue is a 2005 English-language Indian film directed by Aparna Sen. It stars Shabana Azmi, Konkona Sen Sharma, Soumitra Chatterjee, Waheeda Rehman, Dhritiman Chatterjee, Rahul Bose and Kanwaljeet Singh. It won the National Film Award for Best Feature Film in English.

== Plot ==
30-something Mitali aka Meethi has schizophrenia and is taken care of by her older, divorced sister Anjali aka Anu, who is a professor, and their ageing mother. Although she was never married in real life, Meethi has created her own alternate reality in her mind in which she married her ex-fiancé Joydeep and has five children. While Anu has dedicated her life to taking care of Meethi and her mother, even putting her own relationship with a fellow professor on hold, in Meethi's imaginary world both the older women are holding her in the house and away from her husband and children against her will. She imagines her family to be living at the non-existent 15 Park Avenue in Kolkata.

After Meethi has a severe seizure, her case is taken up by a new doctor Kunal Barua. While discussing her sister's case with the new doctor, Anu reveals that though Meethi had dormant schizophrenic traits since childhood, she led a very normal life until her early 20s, before a traumatic experience in the course of her job as a journalist made her withdraw from the outer world. Her fiancé, unable to deal with the emotional upheaval caused by the incidence, broke off the engagement. On the doctor's advice, Anu takes both women on a vacation to Bhutan, where they are spotted by Joydeep, now married with two children. In her present state, Meethi does not recognize Joydeep as the same man she is married to in her imagination, and befriends him. When Joydeep learns of Meethi's worsened condition and her imaginary world, he offers to help her locate the elusive family home - 15 Park Avenue.

Back in Kolkata, Joydeep drives her down to the part of the city where she believes her house and her family are. In a surrealistic climax, Meethi finally locates the house and finds her husband Jojo (as she fondly calls him) and her five children waiting for her return. She walks into the house, reunited with her 'real' family and is never seen again.

== Cast ==
- Shabana Azmi as Anjali
- Konkona Sen Sharma as Meethi
- Soumitra Chatterjee as Meethi's father
- Waheeda Rehman as Meethi's and Anjali's mother
- Rahul Bose as Joydeep Roy
- Dhritiman Chaterji as Dr. Kunal Barua
- Kanwaljit Singh as Anjali's colleague and boyfriend
- Shefali Shah as Lakshmi, Joydeep's wife
- Suranjana Dasgupta as Madwoman on the street
- Dipavali Mehta as Child Meethi
- Sunil Mukherjee as Witchdoctor

== Reception ==
Sonia chopra of Rediff.com called it "hauntingly beautiful." She further wrote, "There's dry, black humour all over the film, if you care to look for it. There's comedy in the darkest of scenes, if you dare to laugh. As Joydeep himself broods, 'It would have been funny, if it wasn't so sad.' Watch the film, and forgive the small irregularities and pace. You'll step into another world. Just like our Mithi."

Conversely, Namrata Joshi of Outlook gave the film 2 out of 4, writing, "In effect, the film seems to have everything going for it. Not quite. Instead of exploring these intriguing associations to their logical emotional depth, Sen leaves them sketchy and open-ended." Taran Adarsh of IndiaFM gave it 1 out of 5 praising the performances but criticised the writing, pace and climax of the film.
