= Ek Je Aachhe Kanya =

2001 Indian Bengali film by Subrata Sen

- DVD cover of movie Ek Je Aachhe Kanya
- Directed by: Subrata Sen
- Written by: Subrata Sen
- Produced by: Sandeep Sen
- Starring: Debashree Roy; Sabyasachi Chakraborty; Konkona Sen Sharma
- Cinematography: Sirsha Ray
- Edited by: Raviranjan Maitra
- Music by: Debojyoti Mishra
- Release date: 6 June 2001
- Running time: 123 minutes
- Language: Bengali

Ek Je Aachhe Kanya is an Indian Bengali language film released in 2001. Directed by Subrata Sen and produced by Sandeep Sen, the film features Konkona Sen Sharma, Debashree Roy and Sabyasachi Chakrabarty. This film is Konkona Sen Sharma's cinematic debut and directorial debut of Subrata Sen.It is a remake of the 1993 American film The Crush.

== Plot ==
Screenshot of Ek Je Aachhe Kanya.

Anjan works in advertising and has recently rented a room in a house in the suburbs of Calcutta. Eighteen-year-old Ria, who lives there with her grand father, falls in love with the new tenant. But Anjan already has a long-time girlfriend Rupa, who works with him in advertising. The rejected girl tries in vain to win Anjan's favour. When she sees that her efforts are futile she starts to make trouble for the couple. At first her mischief is only minor, but it is followed by more serious threats to Anjan's advertising project. And when the couple announces their engagement the girl becomes so enraged that she tries to kill them. A year later Ria is released from a mental institution because the doctors believe her to be stable. Anjan and Rupa are married and have moved away. But a new tenant has moved into grandfather's house... The film candidly reflects the culture degradation of the metropolitan environment, of traditional interpersonal relationships and points to the raising crime rate among young people.

== Cast ==
- Konkona Sen Sharma as Ria
- Sabyasachi Chakrabarty as Anjan
- Debashree Roy as Rupa
- Suchita Ray Chaudhury as Ria's mother
- Bhola Dutta as Mr. Samaddar (Ria's grandfather)
- Arjun Chakraborty as New tenant

== Awards ==
- Gollapudi Srinivas National Award For Best Indian Directorial Debut
