= Gour Hari Dastaan =

Indian film about freedom fighter Gour Hari Das

Gour Hari Dastan
- Directed by: Anant Mahadevan
- Written by: C. P. Surendran
- Produced by: Bindiya Khanolkar; Sachin Khanolkar
- Starring: Vinay Pathak; Konkona Sen Sharma; Ranvir Shorey; Tannishtha Chatterjee
- Cinematography: Alphonse Roy
- Edited by: A. Sreekar Prasad
- Music by: Dr. L. Subramaniam
- Release date: 14 August 2015
- Running time: 114 minutes
- Country: India
- Language: Hindi

Gour Hari Dastan – The Freedom File is a 2015 Indian, biographical film on freedom fighter Gour Hari Das, directed by Anant Mahadevan. The film starred Vinay Pathak, Konkona Sen Sharma, Ranvir Shorey and Tannishtha Chatterjee, among others. The film depicts the life of the Indian freedom fighter from Odisha, Sri Gour Hari Das.

The film released on 14 August 2015, and received good response from critics.

== Plot ==
Gour Hari Dastaan is a story of an Odisha freedom fighter, Gour Hari Das who made his way through a long battle of silent war that lasted for 32 years, against his own government to prove his patriotic association towards the nation. He fought for a certificate recognizing his work as a freedom fighter which took three full decades to arrive.

This was because a minimum of six months in jail was required for the certificate and pension. Gour Hari Das at the age of 14 had spent less than two months in jail. Still, by 2008, most genuine freedom fighters were dead. It was cheaper to pay off the old man rather than let the nuisance persist.

At the age of 84, the much sought-after certificate, when it was ultimately awarded, was a bittersweet victory.[4]

== Cast ==
- Vinay Pathak as Gour Hari Das
- Konkona Sen Sharma as Lakshmi Das
- Ranvir Shorey as Rajiv Singhal
- Tannishtha Chatterjee as Anita
- Vikram Gokhale as Chief Minister
- Vipin Sharma as Ahirkar
- Rajit Kapoor as Mohan Joshi
- Saurabh Shukla as Special Secretary – Freedom Cell
- Neha Pendse as Neha Das
- Asrani as Khadi Commission Boss
- Parikshat Sahni as Principal
- Murli Sharma as Godbole
- Viju Khote as Grossary Man
- Jackie Shroff
- Ashok Banthia as Hari Das (Gour Hari Das' Father)
- Rahul Vohra as Rajiv Mitra
- Vinay Apte as MLA Walve
- Siddharth Jadhav
- Neena Kulkarni as Ms. Apte
- Bharat Dabholkar as Commando 1
- Upendra Limaye as Jail Chief
- Surendra Rajan as Gandhiji
- Sandeep Kulkarni as Home Minister
- Suhas Palshikar as 1st Gandhiwadi
- Kishore Pradhan as Retired Postman
- Ganesh Yadav
- Achint Kaur
- Ananth Narayan Mahadevan
- Deepak Satsule as Alok
- Vidya Malvade as Tanvi
- Chhaya Kadam as Khadi Commission
- Khushboo as Rajiv's feminist-wife
- Satish Pulekar
- Pradeep Haldankar
- Gary Richardson as British Teacher
- Sunil Shende
- Jay Palkar as train passenger

== Soundtrack ==
All music is composed by L. Subramaniam.

No.	Title	Singer(s)	Length
1.	"A Country Gone Wrong"	L Subramaniam	0:38
2.	"A Country Wins Freedom"	L Subramaniam	0:22
3.	"A Dream Fulfilled"	L Subramaniam	0:48
4.	"A New Era Dawns"	L Subramaniam	0:33
5.	"Atharva Veda"	Manjikudi Shastri	1:17
6.	"Babul Mora"	Kavita Krishnamurthy	4:06
7.	"Denial of the Truth"	L Subramaniam	0:58
8.	"Failing Memory"	L Subramaniam	0:41
9.	"Holding on to the Past"	L Subramaniam	2:30
10.	"Hope Recedes"	L Subramaniam	0:59
11.	"Lest I Forget"	L Subramaniam	0:35
12.	"Love Theme"	L Subramaniam	0:39
13.	"Page From The Past"	L Subramaniam	2:22
14.	"Raghupati Raghav"	Narayana Subramaniam	3:17
15.	"Right Now"	Bindu Subramaniam	4:01
16.	"The Englishman and the Flag"	L Subramaniam	0:47
17.	"The Past Is A Memory"	L Subramaniam	0:18
18.	"The Truth Dawns on Alok"	L Subramaniam	0:32
19.	"The Truth Stares"	L Subramaniam	3:16
20.	"Vaishnava Janato Ft. Kavita Krishnamurthy"	Pandit Jasraj	3:10
21.	"Vaishnava Janato Remembering Gandhi"	Kavita Krishnamurthy	5:32
22.	"War of Words"	L Subramaniam	1:31
Total length:			38:52
