= Wake Up Sid =

2009 Indian film by Ayan Mukerji

- Theatrical release poster
- Directed by: Ayan Mukerji
- Written by: Story and Screenplay: Ayan Mukerji; Dialogues: Niranjan Iyengar
- Produced by: Hiroo Yash Johar; Karan Johar
- Starring: Ranbir Kapoor; Konkana Sen Sharma; Anupam Kher
- Cinematography: Anil Mehta
- Edited by: Shan Mohammed
- Music by: Score: Amit Trivedi; Songs: Shankar–Ehsaan–Loy; Amit Trivedi
- Production company: Dharma Productions
- Distributed by: UTV Motion Pictures
- Release date: 2 October 2009
- Running time: 138 minutes
- Country: India
- Language: Hindi
- Budget: ₹18 crore
- Box office: ₹47.10 crore

Wake Up Sid is a 2009 Indian Hindi-language coming-of-age comedy-drama film written and directed by Ayan Mukerji and produced by Dharma Productions. It stars Ranbir Kapoor, Konkona Sen Sharma, and Anupam Kher. Set in contemporary Mumbai, the film tells the story of a careless rich college brat (Kapoor) taught the value of owning up to responsibility by an aspiring writer (Sen Sharma) from Kolkata.

Wake Up Sid was released on 2 October 2009, and proved to be a commercial success at the box office. It received widespread critical acclaim upon release, with critical acclaim for its novel concept, themes, direction, story, screenplay, soundtrack, and cast performances.

At the 55th Filmfare Awards, Wake Up Sid received 9 nominations, including Best Film, Best Director (Mukerji), Best Actor (Kapoor) and Best Supporting Actress (Pathak), and won 3 awards – Best Actor (Critics) (Kapoor), Best Debut Director (Mukerji, tying with Zoya Akhtar for Luck by Chance), and Best Female Playback Singer (Kavita Seth for "Iktara").

== Plot ==
Siddharth “Sid” Mehra, a gifted but aimless young man, is in his final year of college, indifferent to academics despite his intelligence. The son of wealthy businessman Ram Mehra, Sid leads an indulgent lifestyle, enabled by his caring mother, Sarita. His academic effort is negligent—barely studying before exams. Afterward, he celebrates with friends, oblivious to the consequences.

Sid's father offers him a Porsche if he works at the family company for a month. Though initially enticed, Sid soon tires of the corporate environment and quits, giving up the promised car.

At his college farewell party, Sid meets Aisha Banerjee, an ambitious writer from Kolkata who dreams of succeeding at Mumbai Beat magazine. Intrigued by her independence, Sid questions her resolve, but Aisha confidently affirms her aspirations.

When Aisha struggles with terrible hostel conditions, Sid helps her find an apartment. Though the place is shabby, Aisha sees potential. With Sid and his friends’ help, she transforms it, forming a close friendship with him. When Sid suggests romance, Aisha gently rejects him, citing his lack of ambition.

Aisha soon secures her job under the urbane Kabir Chaudhary at Mumbai Beat. Meanwhile, Sid receives devastating news: he has failed his final exams. Overwhelmed, he fights with his friends and storms out after having a heated argument with his parents. With nowhere to go, he turns to Aisha, who reluctantly lets him stay.

Living together proves difficult. Sid struggles with basic chores, while Aisha, absorbed in her work, grows increasingly frustrated due to his clumsiness and incompetence. After a heated argument, Aisha advises him to return to his parents' house since his father has a successful company while he is only useful for helping around the house, but Sid reveals that when he was working at his father's company, he felt out of place and wants to find a job that truly interests him and pleads for another chance. She allows him to stay longer, and Sid begins to change—taking responsibility for housework and rekindling his love for photography. Aisha introduces him to Amit, a photography director at Mumbai Beat, who offers him an internship after seeing Sid's work.

Sid embraces discipline and builds a new life. An obligation for Aisha's neighbours triggers memories of Sarita, prompting Sid to reconcile with her. He also repairs his friendships.

As Sid pursues a feature opportunity at Mumbai Beat, Aisha achieves a milestone—her article gets accepted for publication. Although she briefly dates Kabir, she realizes they are incompatible and becomes aware of her growing feelings for Sid.

Sid’s hard work pays off when he is promoted to assistant photographer and receives his first paycheck. Proud of what he has achieved, he visits Ram at his office, thanks him sincerely, and reconciles with him, while his father finally comes to terms with his interest. Sid then decides to move back home. Before leaving Aisha’s apartment, he offers her a gift to thank her for letting him stay, but she rejects it. Hurt that Sid made such a big decision without talking to her first, Aisha accuses him of being thoughtless and immature. Sid becomes frustrated because he feels that, despite his efforts to change, she still sees him as a child. Saddened by their argument, Aisha lets him go.

At home, Sid discovers Aisha's forgotten shirt and reads her article in Mumbai Beat—a touching piece about her journey in Mumbai and her love for an unnamed person. Realizing the article is about him, Sid is overcome with emotion.

Determined, he rushes through the rain to their favorite beach spot. Finding Aisha there, he confesses his love, and she reciprocates. They embrace, marking Sid's transformation from a carefree slacker into a man of purpose and substance.

== Cast ==
- Ranbir Kapoor as Siddharth "Sid" Mehra
- Konkona Sen Sharma as Aisha Banerjee
- Anupam Kher as Ram Mehra
- Supriya Pathak as Sarita Mehra
- Rahul Khanna as Kabir Choudhary
- Kashmera Shah as Sonia Gill
- Shikha Talsania as Laxmi Inder Advani
- Namit Das as Rishi Atul Raheja
- Krutika Bolaki as Neha, Rishi's love interest
- Rahul Pendkalkar as Sanjay "Sanju" Bapat
- Sanat Sawant as Jay Mehra
- Shruti Bapna as Debbie
- Nitin Chatterjee as a restaurant steward
- Kainaz Motivala as Tanya Lathia
- Mukesh Rawal as Mr. Lathia, Tanya's Father, Ram Mehra's close friend
- Atisha Naik as Sanju's mother
- Asif Ali Baig as Raj
- Munir Kabani as Amit, Head Photographer at Mumbai Beat
- Mohsin Ali Khan as Chhotu, Sid's servant
- Huzefa Gadiwala

== Production ==
=== Shooting ===
Wake Up Sid was entirely shot in Mumbai, covering the areas of South Mumbai and Bandra. The college sequence was shot at H. R. College of Commerce and Economics near Churchgate, Mumbai.

== Release ==
=== Theatrical release ===
Wake Up Sid released on 2 October 2009, coinciding with the Gandhi Jayanti extended weekend.

=== Television Rights ===
Wake Up Sid's television rights were sold to Colors at the time of its premiere, whence it would subsequently premiere on UTV Movies, and later Bindass. Eventually, after the Disney acquisition of Star India, the film began premiering with multiple slot re-runs on Star Gold Select.

=== Home Video ===
Wake Up Sid's DVD was published by UTV Home Video.

=== Game ===
UTV Indiagames also released a mobile video game based on the film.

== Reception ==
=== Box office ===
Wake Up Sid opened well in India and overseas markets. Its opening weekend gross was ₹215 million (US$2.2 million) of which the domestic gross was ₹170 million (US$1.8 million). It was number one in the box office during its first and second weeks, number four during its third week, and number three during its fourth week.

In the United Kingdom, the film collected US$165,934, while in the US, the collections were US$717,977. By its fourth week, it grossed $348,351 in New Zealand and the United Kingdom. Do Knot Disturb also released during the same time, but Wake Up Sid got a larger portion of the audience.

=== Critical reception ===
Wake Up Sid received widespread critical acclaim upon release, with high praise for its novel concept, themes, direction, story, screenplay, soundtrack and performances of the cast.

Subhash K. Jha from Bollywood Hungama gave Wake Up Sid a rave review stating that it is, "a triumph on many levels [...] Ayan Mukerji takes the age-old dramatic conflicts of our commercial cinema into understated corridors. Similarly, Taran Adarsh of Bollywood Hungama gave the film 4 out of 5 stars as well as a "thumbs up" stating that it is "strongly recommended." Rajeev Masand of CNN-IBN gave the film 3.5 out of 5 stars, stating that Wake Up Sid "has its heart in the right place and marks the breakout of a bright, shining star who has come into his own so early in his acting career. Watch it, and be awestruck by Ranbir."

Mayank Shekhar of Hindustan Times gave it 3.5 out of 4 stars and states, "Wake Up Sid belongs to a sweet genre that, without doubt, flows on from Farhan Akhtar's Dil Chahta Hai (2001): part-Hollywood; part-Bollywood; mostly coming-of-age; subtly romantic; largely original; authentic in feel; light in weight; English in expression; Hindi in language." Avijit Ghosh of The Times of India gave it 3.5 out of 4 stars and suggests that, "Wake Up Sid becomes a sort of template of how GenNow navigate their lives: deal with their own little rebellions, find meaning to their own definitions of independence and handle their own set of mistakes. It feels good when the two friends finally meet in driving rain under the grey skies by the sea. Refreshing and heart-warming, Wake Up Sid really puts you in the mood for love." Noyon Jyoti Parasara of AOL India gave it 3.5 out of 5 stars and praised the director saying, "Ayan Mukerji arrives in style and manages to leave his own mark on the film despite having a producer like Karan Johar whose other productions always tend to have his stamp. Wake Up Sid really puts you in the mood for love."

Joginder Tuteja of the Indo-Asian News Service (IANS) calls the film "flawless" and gave it 3.5 stars out of 5. He states: "There are 5 things that make Wake Up Sid a delightful affair. It has a constant flow throughout; no over-the-top or understated drama; no ultra-emotional strangulation of audiences; absolutely no yuppie cool dude act; and last but not the least, this is an original and refreshing story." Rachel Saltz of The New York Times argues that: "With no big production numbers (songs play over montage sequences), a quiet style and credible characters, Wake Up Sid is Bollywood in an indie mood, a film for people like Aisha and Sid: young and educated. It may not be as hip as Bombay Beat, the magazine where the two work, but it shows that Mr. Mukerji is a director to watch."

In one point of criticism, Sudhish Kamath of Chennai's The Hindu labeled the closing moments as a "stock-ending" and noted that, despite the film's overall effectiveness, the ending "leaves you a little disappointed." Variety's Joe Leydon found the film "instantly forgettable", but praised the performances of Sharma and Kapoor, as well noting how "effortlessly appealing" the film is, stating: "...this atypically low-key Bollywood romantic comedy somehow manages to remain pleasantly diverting throughout its 138-minute running time."

=== Controversy ===
On 2 October, Maharashtra Navnirman Sena supporters protested to halt the screening of Wake Up Sid in Mumbai and Pune. The MNS objected the use of the word "Bombay" instead of "Mumbai" in the film.

== Accolades ==
Award	Category	Recipient(s) and nominee(s)	Result	Ref.
55th Filmfare Awards	Best Director	Ayan Mukerji	Nominated	
55th Filmfare Awards	Best Debut Director	Ayan Mukerji	Won	
55th Filmfare Awards	Best Actor	Ranbir Kapoor	Nominated	
55th Filmfare Awards	Best Actor (Critics)	Ranbir Kapoor (also for Ajab Prem Ki Ghazab Kahani and Rocket Singh: Salesman of the Year)	Won	
55th Filmfare Awards	Best Female Playback Singer	Kavita Seth for "Iktara"	Won	
55th Filmfare Awards	Best Film	Wake Up Sid	Nominated	
55th Filmfare Awards	Best Supporting Actress	Supriya Pathak	Nominated	
55th Filmfare Awards	Best Music Director	Shankar–Ehsaan–Loy	Nominated	
55th Filmfare Awards	Best Lyricist	Javed Akhtar for "Iktara"	Nominated	
Screen Awards	Most Promising Debut Director	Ayan Mukerji	Nominated	
Screen Awards	Best Female Playback Singer	Kavita Seth for "Iktara"	Won	
Stardust Awards	Superstar Of Tomorrow – Male	Ranbir Kapoor (also for Ajab Prem Ki Ghazab Kahani)	Won	
Stardust Awards	Hottest New Director	Ayan Mukerji	Won	
Stardust Awards	Best Film Of The Year – Drama	Wake Up Sid	Nominated	
Stardust Awards	Best Supporting Actress	Supriya Pathak	Nominated	
Stardust Awards	New Musical Sensation – Female	Kavita Seth for "Iktara"	Nominated	
Producers Guild Film Awards	Best Debut Director	Ayan Mukerji	Won	
Producers Guild Film Awards	Best Director	Ayan Mukerji	Nominated	
Producers Guild Film Awards	Best Story	Ayan Mukerji	Nominated	
Producers Guild Film Awards	Best Actor in a Leading Role	Ranbir Kapoor	Nominated	
Producers Guild Film Awards	Best Actress in a Leading Role	Konkona Sen Sharma	Nominated	
Producers Guild Film Awards	Best Actor in a Supporting Role	Anupam Kher	Nominated	
Producers Guild Film Awards	Best Actress in a Supporting Role	Supriya Pathak	Nominated	
Producers Guild Film Awards	Best Costume Design	Manish Malhotra	Nominated	
Producers Guild Film Awards	Best Art Direction	Amrita Mahal	Nominated	
International Indian Film Academy Awards	Best Female Playback Singer	Kavita Seth for "Iktara"	Won	
International Indian Film Academy Awards	Best Director	Ayan Mukerji	Nominated	
International Indian Film Academy Awards	Best Story	Ayan Mukerji	Nominated	
International Indian Film Academy Awards	Best Actor	Ranbir Kapoor	Nominated	
International Indian Film Academy Awards	Best Supporting Actress	Supriya Pathak	Nominated	
2nd Mirchi Music Awards	Listeners' Choice Song of the Year	"Iktara"	Won	

== Soundtrack ==
The music was composed by Shankar–Ehsaan–Loy with lyrics by Javed Akhtar. The soundtrack was released on 21 August 2009 to positive reviews. Amit Trivedi, who provided the film's background score, guest-composed the song "Iktara", its reprise and extended version, all of which featured vocals by frequent collaborator Amitabh Bhattacharya.
