= A Death in the Gunj =

2016 Indian film by Konkona Sen Sharma

A Death In The Gunj
- Directed by: Konkona Sen Sharma
- Screenplay by: Konkona Sen Sharma; Disha Rindani
- Story by: Mukul Sharma
- Produced by: Ashish Bhatnagar; Vijay Kumar Swami; Raagii Bhatnagar; Honey Trehan; Abhishek Chaubey; Neil Patel (co-producer)
- Starring: Vikrant Massey; Kalki Koechlin; Ranvir Shorey; Tillotama Shome; Gulshan Devaiah; Jim Sarbh; Om Puri; Tanuja
- Cinematography: Sirsha Ray
- Edited by: Aarif Sheikh; Manas Mittal
- Music by: Sagar Desai
- Production companies: MacGuffin Pictures; Studioz IDrream; Moh Maya Films (presenter)
- Release dates: 10 September 2016 (Toronto); 2 June 2017
- Running time: 107 minutes
- Country: India
- Language: English
- Box office: ₹13.7 million

A Death In The Gunj is a 2016 Indian English-language drama thriller film written and directed by Konkona Sen Sharma. The film features an ensemble cast of Vikrant Massey, Tillotama Shome, Om Puri, Tanuja, Gulshan Devaiah, Kalki Koechlin, Jim Sarbh and Ranvir Shorey.

The film has been produced by Ashish Bhatnagar, Vijay Kumar Swami, Raagii Bhatnagar, Abhishek Chaubey, and Honey Trehan under the banners of Studioz IDrream and MacGuffin Pictures. It is Sen Sharma's directorial debut feature. Principal photography began in February 2016 and was completed in March 2016 after a six-week shoot in McCluskieganj, Jharkhand.

The film released on 2 June 2017 and received eight nominations at the 63rd Filmfare Awards, including Best Film (Critics), Best Actor (Critics) for Massey, Best Supporting Actress for Tillotama Shome, and it won the Filmfare Award for Best Debut Director for Konkona Sen Sharma.

== Plot ==
In McCluskieganj, Bihar (now in Jharkhand) an old Anglo-Indian town in 1979, two men, Nandu and Brian, stare at a dead body inside the trunk of their car. They discuss what to do with it. They then drive away with a third person, Shutu, sitting in the backseat of the car from the front of a morgue. The film then flashes back to one week earlier.

Nandu, his wife, Bonnie, their daughter, Tani, Bonnie's friend, Mimi, and his cousin, Shyamal "Shutu," arrive at Nandu's parents' house in McCluskieganj from Calcutta. Later, Nandu's friends, Vikram and Brian, arrive with the former being recently engaged. Shutu, the main character of the film, is shown to be extremely sensitive and gentle, which often makes him the target of the jokes and pranks played by his family and friends. Despite having been a topper in his school, he just failed his exams and misses his recently passed father greatly. His closest companion in the family is Tani, and Nandu's mother is the only other person who seems to care for him.

As the week goes by, Shutu begins to feel more and more alienated. He is injured in a game of Kabaddi by the aggressive and hot-headed Vikram. He also becomes attracted to Mimi, and the two sleep together. Shutu begins to like Mimi, but she isn't interested in him for anything besides sex, as she is attracted to Vikram. Shutu takes Mimi for a ride on the motorcycle, and when they come back, they discover that Tani has run away after Shutu chose to spend time with Mimi over her. Shutu is visibly upset by Tani's disappearance and feels guilty. He and Nandu go to search for her, but Shutu accidentally falls into a deep ditch, and Nandu leaves without him. Nandu arrives home and sees that Vikram has found Tani safe and sound. The whole family is relieved, and for a long time, no one notices that Shutu is missing. The servant eventually finds him, but Shutu is upset that no one was worried about him and did not bother looking for him. Tani also refuses to talk to him, which upsets him further.

The following day, Shutu buys a train ticket for home. He tells Mimi that he will be back in Calcutta soon and will surely meet her. She brushes him off and rudely tells him that he should concentrate on his studies. Shutu goes outside, where he sees everyone happy in each other's company. O.P., Nandu's father, shows him the proper way to shoot a rifle with his very old and rustic rifle while Shutu watches Mimi flirt with Vikram and everyone else looking happy and content. Feeling invisible, unwanted, and unloved, after a week of quiet unraveling, Shutu forcefully takes the rifle from O.P. and points it at O.P. and at others. Shocked, everyone tries to plead with him to return the rifle and refrain him from pulling the trigger. After a few moments, he turns the rifle and points it under his chin and shoots himself dead. (Note: Director Konkona Sen Sharma later clarified in an interview that Shutu did kill himself and that his presence in the backseat is "a ghost or an emotional presence or a memory".)

The movie ends with the opening scene in which Nandu and Brian drive away with Shutu's dead body in the trunk with the ghost of Shutu in the backseat. The closing credits show the road behind the moving car from this ghost's perspective.

== Cast ==
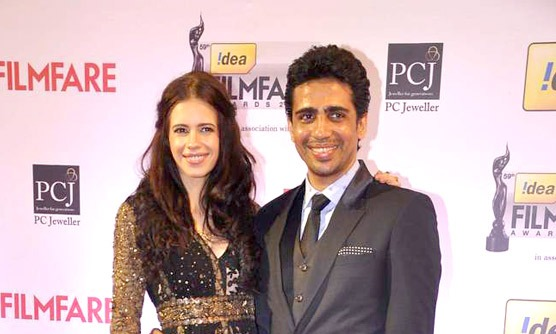
Koechlin and Devaiah have major roles in the film.

- Vikrant Massey as Shyamal 'Shutu' Chatterjee
- Ranvir Shorey as Vikramjit Chaudhary
- Kalki Koechlin as Mimi
- Tillotama Shome as Bonnie Bakshi
- Gulshan Devaiah as Nandan 'Nandu' Bakshi
- Tanuja as Anupama Bakshi - Nandu's mother
- Om Puri as O.P. Bakshi - Nandu's father
- Jim Sarbh as Brian McKenzie
- Arya Sharma as Tania 'Tani' Bakshi - Nandu's daughter
- Aparna Sen as Aparna Chatterjee - Shutu's mother (only voice)
- Virginia Vacho as Mrs. Curney
- Canteen Majid as Mr. Curney
- Promila Pradhan as Purnima Chaudhary - Vikramjit's wife
- Ashok Pathak as Maniya - Bakshis' servant
- Saraswati Devi Wishkarma as Manjari - Bakshis' maid
- Shimanti Kumari as Manjari's friend
- Chandram Bhagat as Maniya's friend
- Nina Sharma as Mrs. McKenzie
- Kitty Texeira as Kitty - McKenzie's Help
- Uttam Mishra as Post Office clerk

== Production ==
The film is based on short story by the same name by writer-journalist Mukul Sharma. The story, according to him, is inspired by true events which took place in McCluskieganj, where he and his then wife, director Aparna Sen, had bought a house. A planchette session had gone wrong, apparently leading to the mysterious death of one of the participants. As he recalled in an interview: "That day we were asking who would die first. And when we came to our friend Chris Tripthorpe, I just didn't say anything. He got scared and ran away. And he died after that – got run over by a train. Many believed it was suicide." Director Konkona Sen Sharma, having heard the story from her father who later wrote short story on it.

== Soundtrack ==
A Death in the Gunj

Soundtrack album by Sagar Desai
- Released: 9 February 2018
- Genre: Feature film soundtrack
- Length: 28:36
- Label: Sony Music India

The background score is given by Sagar Desai. The soundtrack which includes three folk songs was released by Sony Music.

Track listing
No.	Title	Singer(s)	Length
1.	"Into the Gunj"		2:42
2.	"Toothe Gachhe Bhoot Nache (Traditional)"	Simanthi Kumari & Chandram Bhagat	2:06
3.	"Jiri Jiri"	Promila Pradhan	3:55
4.	"The Sweater"		1:31
5.	"Planchette"		1:09
6.	"Shutu Mimi"		2:21
7.	"Raiyo Raiyo"	Simanthi Kumari	0:42
8.	"Kabaddi"		1:44
9.	"Shutu's Pain"		1:56
10.	"Shutu's Dilemma and the Sister's Letter"		1:55
11.	"A Death in the Gunj"		7:09
12.	"Toothe Gachhe Bhoot Nache"	Simanthi Kumari	1:26

== Release ==
A Death in the Gunj was launched by Gulzar and Vishal Bhardwaj at a press conference on 13 January 2016. The film's World premiere took place at the 21st annual 2016 Toronto International Film Festival on 10 September 2016. Its Asian premiere was held at the 21st Busan International Film Festival on 7 October 2016. It was chosen as the Opening Film for the 18th Mumbai Film Festival where it was screened on 21 October 2016 and where director Konkona Sensharma received the 'MasterCard Best India Female Filmmaker 2016 Award'. A Death in the Gunj also had its US premiere as the Opening Film of its 13th South Asian International Film Festival on the night of 30 November 2016. The film released in Indian theatres on June 2, 2017.

=== Box office ===
A Death in the Gunj released in India on a meagre 100 screens and had an average opening. It collected a total of ₹5.2 million in its opening week. With a limited theatrical release, the film earned around ₹10 million during its entire run at the box-office.

== Critical reception ==
On review aggregator website Rotten Tomatoes, A Death in the Gunj has an approval score of 92% based on 13 reviews with an average rating of 7.40 out of 10. Nihit Bhave of The Times of India gave the film a rating of 3.5 out of 5 and said that, "A Death In The Gunj will make you drop your jaw several times, except for the one time you'd really want it to: the climax." Rohit Vats of Hindustan Times gave the film a rating of 3 out of 5 and said that, "Konkona Sen Sharma's film is a successful experiment despite loopholes. And it is brave." Saibal Chatterjee of NDTV said that A Death in the Gunj is "a sensitive, profoundly moving portrait of an angst-ridden young man derailed by a world bereft of empathy." The critic gave the film a rating of 4 out of 5 and concluded his review by saying that, "A Death In The Gunj is a chiselled gem of a film – as resplendent as it is sobering."

Rajeev Masand gave the film a rating of 4 out of 5 and said that, "A Death in the Gunj benefits from Konkona Sen Sharma's perceptive, assured direction. It's one of the best films of the year, and one that you'll find hard to shake off in a hurry." Shubhra Gupta of The Indian Express gave the film a rating of 3.5 out of 5 saying that, "Konkona Sensharma's assured directorial debut, unpacks a complex sentiment with feeling, and gives us a layered film with memorable characters about the games people play, and how, sometimes, that can have terrible consequences." Aseem Chhabra of Rediff gave the film a rating of 4 out of 5 and said that, "A Death in the Gunj is not a happy film at all times, but it is very entertaining -- not in a loud way, but in the sense that watching it is a very satisfying experience." Namrata Joshi of The Hindu said that, "Konkona Sen Sharma's debut is a marvellously measured film, where each element of filmmaking is staggeringly synchronous with the other." Stephen Dalton of The Hollywood Reporter said that "A Death in the Gunj is an assured debut feature that leaves a haunting air of melancholy in its wake."

== Film festivals ==
A Death in the Gunj opened to positive response at various film festivals. It started its festival run by being invited to screen at 2016 Toronto International Film Festival by festival programmer and film critic, Cameron Bailey. There on, ADITG has been screened at over 30 film festivals, domestic as well as internationally. ADITG has received 7 nominations in various film festivals and received 5 awards.

== Accolades ==
Date of ceremony	Award	Category	Recipients	Result	Ref.
20 January 2018	Filmfare Awards	Best Debut Director	Konkona Sen Sharma	Won	
20 January 2018	Filmfare Awards	Best Cinematography	Sirsha Ray	Won	
20 January 2018	Filmfare Awards	Best Costume Design	Rohit Chaturvedi	Won	
20 January 2018	Filmfare Awards	Best Film (Critics)	A Death In The Gunj	Nominated	
20 January 2018	Filmfare Awards	Best Actor (Critics)	Vikrant Massey	Nominated	
20 January 2018	Filmfare Awards	Best Supporting Actress	Tillotama Shome	Nominated	
20 January 2018	Filmfare Awards	Best Background Score	Sagar Desai	Nominated	
20 January 2018	Filmfare Awards	Best Production Design	Siddharth Sirohi	Nominated	
20 January 2018	Filmfare Awards	Best Editing	Aarif Sheikh, Manas Mittal	Nominated	
