= Goynar Baksho =

2013 Indian Bengali film

- Movie poster
- Directed by: Aparna Sen
- Written by: Aparna Sen
- Based on: Goynar Baksho by Shirshendu Mukhopadhyay
- Produced by: Shrikant Mohta; Mahendra Soni
- Starring: Moushumi Chatterjee; Konkona Sen Sharma; Srabanti Chatterjee; Saswata Chatterjee; Kaushik Sen
- Cinematography: Soumik Haldar
- Edited by: Rabiranjan Maitra
- Music by: Debojyoti Mishra
- Distributed by: Shree Venkatesh Films
- Release date: 12 April 2013
- Running time: 141 minutes
- Country: India
- Language: Bengali

Goynar Baksho (transl. The Jewellery Box) is a 2013 Indian Bengali-language supernatural comedy horror film directed by Aparna Sen. The film is based on a novel Goynar Baksho written by Shirshendu Mukhopadhyay and published in Desh magazine. The film premiered in Kolkata on 12 April 2013.

== Plot ==
The story is centred around the a wooden box containing 500 tolah of gold ornaments kept sequestered away. Its original owner is Rashmani, the daughter of a Bengali Hindu zamindar family from Faridpur, who was married off at the age of 11 & was tragically widowed within a few months of her marriage. She was extremely possessive of her jewellery(as that was the only security she had left) & utilised her hot temper to keep others away from her jewellery box. Following the partition of Bengal, she migrated alongside her brothers' family to a suburb called Nababganj located near Ichapore in West Bengal. In 1949, Somalata, the daughter of a poor family, enters the household as the wife of Chandan, the younger of the 2 sons of Rashmani's younger brother. Due to not being greedy for jewellery, Rashmani develops a liking for her. However, a few months after Somalata's marriage, Rashmani dies. Due to excessive attachment towards her jewellery, Rashmani becomes a ghost in her afterlife. To keep her jewellery away from the hands of her greedy relatives, Rashmani's ghost hands them over to Somalata.

As time progresses, the family's accumulated wealth steadily decreases due to the male members of the family refusing to work for a living in order to protect their aristocratic heritage, exacerbated by the cost of legal fees incurred in resolving the property dispute between Rashmani's two brothers and the gambling addiction of Chandan's elder brother. In midst of all of these difficulties, Somalata was able to keep the jewellery box hidden away, under the ever-watchful eye of Rashmani's ghost. Finally, she secretly arranges for some money by pawning some of the hidden jewellery, and with that money she sets up a business of selling saris, despite opposition from her father-in-law and brother-in-law. Somalata effectively manages the shop (which she named after Rashmani in her honour) and was able to get back the pawned jewellery. When Somalata was to be confronted about the capital for the saree shop, Rashmani told her about the existence of Somalata's father-inlaw's mistress, Chandan's mistress, and gambling problem of Chandan's elder brother to save her.Later that night, Somalata confronted Chandan about his mistress and resolved the matter.When Chandan went Mumbai for shop stocking, a poet started following Somalata, Rashmani encouraged her to forge an extra-marital affair, as why should boys have all the fun. Somalata slowly falls in love with a Bengali Muslim man named Rafiq who was a poet, but she later abandoned him out of conscience and consummated her marriage completely with Chandan, heartbroken Rafiq committed suicide. Failing to make Somalata rebel, Rashmani stopped visiting her and started meeting Somalata's daughter Chaitali later on.

Modernist & pursuing higher education in a college, Chaitali usually talks to Rashmani just like her mother used to. Since Chaitali was identical to Rashmani, Somalata believes that Rashmani had reincarnated as Chaitali, so she hands over Rashmani's jewellery box to her. The film now progresses to the year 1971 with the outbreak of the Bangladesh Liberation War. Chaitali's boyfriend Banwarilal (alias Benu) repeatedly crossed the border to provide supplies to the Mukti Bahini. After his friend was caught and shot dead by the Pakistani army, Chaitali on being advised by Rashmani's ghost, donates all the jewellery in that box to the cause of the Mukti Bahini and later Chaitali also learns about Rafiq and Somalata's past from the last few scripts of poems written by Rafiq which she finds in an abandoned house where she used to meet with her lover "Benu".She places those letters in that jewellery box for Somalata in making her realize the depth of love which Rafiq had for her in the past. In the end Somalata finally realized her feelings which she had in the past which causes Rashmani's soul to finally have peace and to be liberated from the state of being a ghost.

== Production ==
Aparna Sen thought to make this film in 1993. But she was not getting the right production house to finance the film. That is why she had to delay the project so long. Sen told–

"When I first read the book way back in 1993, I instantly decided to turn it into celluloid, but the delay was due to not getting the right production house to finance the film. Now finally it is happening."

== Cast ==
- Moushumi Chatterjee as Rashmani
- Konkona Sen Sharma as Somalata
- Srabanti Chatterjee as Chaitali & younger Rashmani
- Saswata Chatterjee as Chandan
- Paran Bandopadhyay as Chandan's Father, Rashmani's younger brother
- Aparajita Adhya as Chandan's sister-in-law
- Pijush Ganguly as Chandan's elder brother
- Manasi Sinha as Chandan's mother
- Kaushik Sen as Rafiq, Somalata's sometime lover
- Koushik Roy as Banwarilal aka Benu, Chaitali's lover & Ramakhilao, a low caste Bihari Hindu labourer with whom the young Rashmani had a brief affair
- Monu Mukhopadhyay as Chandan's paternal uncle, Rashmani's elder brother
- Sudipta Chakraborty as Kamala, Chandan's mistress
- Pradip Mukherjee as the family doctor

== Tracklist ==
Song name	Singers
"Aamar Sonar Bangla"	Arijit Singh, Samantak, Ipshita
"Bangla Rap"	Paran Bandopadhyay, Saswata Chatterjee, Konkona Sen Sharma, Pijush Ganguly, Moushumi Chatterjee
"Basonar Gaan"	Kaushiki Chakrabarty
"Chandan Kumkum"	Paromita, Ipshita, Sweta, Debolina
"O Boner Dubba Re"	Paromita, Ipshita, Sweta, Debolina
"Ki Ache Goynar Bakshe"	Anindya Chatterjee, Upal Sengupta
"Nodir Oparey Ghono Kuasha"	Rupankar Bagchi
"Sakhi Ri"	Shubha Mudgal

== Awards and nominations ==
Ceremony	Category	Nominee	Result
Filmfare Awards East	Best Director – Bengali	Aparna Sen	Nominated
Filmfare Awards East	Best Actor in a Leading Role (Female) – Bengali	Konkona Sen Sharma	Won
Filmfare Awards East	Best Actor in a Supporting Role (Female) – Bengali	Moushumi Chatterjee	Won
Filmfare Awards East	Best Actor in a Supporting Role (Male) – Bengali	Saswata Chatterjee	Nominated

== See also ==
- Aborto
- Balukabela.com
