= Laaga Chunari Mein Daag =

- Theatrical release poster
- Directed by: Pradeep Sarkar
- Written by: Rekha Nigam
- Story by: Aditya Chopra
- Based on: Doghi by Sumitra Bhave
- Produced by: Aditya Chopra; Pradeep Sarkar
- Starring: Rani Mukerji; Jaya Bachchan; Konkona Sen Sharma; Kunal Kapoor; Abhishek Bachchan; Anupam Kher
- Cinematography: Sushil Rajpal
- Edited by: Kaushik Das
- Music by: Shantanu Moitra
- Production companies: Yash Raj Films; Apocalypso Filmworks
- Distributed by: Yash Raj Films
- Release date: 12 October 2007
- Running time: 137 minutes
- Country: India
- Language: Hindi
- Box office: est. ₹250 million

Laaga Chunari Mein Daag – Journey Of A Woman (transl. My Veil Is Stained) is a 2007 Indian Hindi-language drama film directed by Pradeep Sarkar and produced by Sarkar and Aditya Chopra under the Yash Raj Films and Apocalypso Filmworks banner. Based on Chopra's story adaptation of writer Sumitra Bhave's Marathi story Doghi, the film stars Jaya Bachchan, Rani Mukerji, Konkona Sen Sharma, Kunal Kapoor, Anupam Kher, and Abhishek Bachchan.

== Cast ==
- Rani Mukerji as Vibhavari "Badki" Sahay / Natasha
- Jaya Bachchan as Savitri Sahay
- Konkona Sen Sharma as Shubhavari "Chukti" Sahay
- Kunal Kapoor as Vivaan Varma
- Abhishek Bachchan as Rohan Verma
- Anupam Kher as Shivshankar Sahay
- Hema Malini as Dulari Bai (special appearance)
- Kamini Kaushal as Rohan and Vivaan's grandmother
- Harsh Chhaya as K. Gupta
- Murali Sharma as Sunil Butalia
- Tinnu Anand as Rajshankar "Rajjo" Sahay
- Sushant Singh as Ratan Sahay
- Suchitra Pillai as Michelle
- Ninad Kamat as Karan
- Tarana Raja as Sophia
- Bharti Achrekar as Didiya
- Shriya Sharma as Jhini
- Amey Pandya as Lallan
- Kalki Koechlin as World Patents & Trademarks Conference Announcer (cameo appearance)

== Production ==
=== Development ===
Laaga Chunari Mein Daag was directed by Pradeep Sarkar and produced by Aditya Chopra under the Yash Raj Films banner. The film was largely inspired by K. Balachander's Aaina.

=== Casting ===
The principal cast included Rani Mukerji in the lead role, alongside Bachchan and Sen Sharma. Additional roles were played by Kunal Kapoor, Anupam Kher, and Hema Malini.

=== Filming ===
Principal photography took place across locations in India and Switzerland such as Mumbai, Varanasi, and Bern.

== Release ==
Laaga Chunari Mein Daag – Journey of a Woman was released theatrically on 12 October 2007 in India and select international territories, including Asia and the United Kingdom.

== Reception ==
=== Box office ===
The film earned ₹17.5 crore in India and ₹3.17 crore in other territories, for a worldwide total of ₹ 20.67 crore.

=== Critical response ===
==== India ====
In India, the film received generally negative reviews. Raja Sen of Rediff.com wrote that it represented "a kind of cinema we thought we were done with," adding, "Indian cinema threw off the dupatta just a little while ago; let's not shackle it back down".

Hindustan Times rated the film two stars and called the plot "vintage 1977" and drawing comparisons to the Hindi film Aaina and the Marathi film Doghi (1995).

==== International ====
The film received a more mixed reception internationally. On the review aggregator website Rotten Tomatoes, the film received 50%. David Chute of LA Weekly criticized the film for sanitizing its themes, stating that it "works so hard to transform its shocking subject into acceptable material for middlebrow melodrama that it never deals with it". Rachel Saltz of The New York Times characterized the film as "a fascinating blend of musical, melodrama and feminist fairy tale."

== Accolades ==
Award	Date of the ceremony	Category	Recipients	Result	Ref.
Stardust Awards	26 January 2008	Actor of the Year – Female	Rani Mukerji	Nominated	
Filmfare Awards	16 February 2008	Best Actress	Rani Mukerji	Nominated	
Filmfare Awards	16 February 2008	Best Supporting Actress	Konkona Sen Sharma	Nominated	
Producers Guild Film Awards	30 March 2008	Best Actress in a Leading Role	Rani Mukerji	Nominated	
IIFA Awards	6–8 June 2008	Best Actress	Rani Mukerji	Nominated	
IIFA Awards	6–8 June 2008	Best Supporting Actress	Konkona Sen Sharma	Nominated	

== Soundtrack ==
Laaga Chunari Mein Daag — Journey Of A Woman

Studio album by Shantanu Moitra
- Released: 17 September 2007 (India)
- Genre: Feature film soundtrack
- Label: YRF Music
- Producer: Aditya Chopra

Shantanu Moitra chronology
Eklavya: The Royal Guard (2007)	Laaga Chunari Mein Daag — Journey Of A Woman (2007)	Khoya Khoya Chand (2007)

The soundtrack of Laaga Chunari Mein Daag – Journey of a Woman was composed by Shantanu Moitra, with lyrics by Swanand Kirkire. It was released on 17 September 2007 by Yash Raj Music. The album features vocals by Sunidhi Chauhan, Shreya Ghoshal, and KK.

#	Song	Singer(s)	Length	Picturised on
1	"Hum To Aise Hain"	Sunidhi Chauhan, Shreya Ghoshal, Swanand Kirkire and Pranab Biswas	05:07	Rani Mukherji, Konkona Sen Sharma, Jaya Bachchan and Anupam Kher
2	"Zara Gungunalein Chalo"	Babul Supriyo, Mahalakshmi Iyer	04:46	Abhishek Bachchan and Rani Mukherji
3	"Chunari Mein Daag"	Shubha Mudgal & Meeta Vashisht	04:21	Rani Mukherji
4	"Ik Teekhi Teekhi Si Ladki"	KK and Shreya Ghoshal	04:45	Kunal Kapoor and Konkona Sen Sharma
5	"Ehi Thaiyaa Motiya"	Rekha Bhardwaj	04:40	Hema Malini
6	"Kachchi Kaliyaan"	Sonu Nigam, KK, Sunidhi Chauhan and Shreya Ghoshal	04:35	Jaya Bachchan, Rani Mukherji, Konkona Sen Sharma, Anupam Kher, Kunal Kapoor and Abhishek Bachchan
