= Luck by Chance =

2009 film by Zoya Akhtar

- Theatrical release poster
- Directed by: Zoya Akhtar
- Written by: Zoya Akhtar; Javed Akhtar
- Produced by: Farhan Akhtar; Ritesh Sidhwani
- Starring: Farhan Akhtar; Konkana Sen Sharma; Rishi Kapoor; Juhi Chawla; Dimple Kapadia
- Cinematography: Carlos Catalan
- Edited by: Anand Subaya
- Music by: Shankar–Ehsaan–Loy
- Production company: Excel Entertainment
- Distributed by: BIG Pictures
- Release date: 30 January 2009
- Running time: 156 minutes
- Country: India
- Language: Hindi
- Budget: ₹ 150 million
- Box office: est. ₹ 290 million

Luck by Chance is a 2009 Indian Hindi-language drama film written and directed by Zoya Akhtar in her directorial debut. Produced by Farhan Akhtar and Ritesh Sidhwani, it stars Farhan Akhtar and Konkana Sen Sharma in lead roles, with Rishi Kapoor, Dimple Kapadia, Juhi Chawla, Sanjay Kapoor, Isha Sharvani, Alyy Khan and Sheeba Chaddha in pivotal supporting roles. Hrithik Roshan makes an extended cameo appearance. Guest stars and industry folk starring as themselves included Shah Rukh Khan, Aamir Khan, Abhishek Bachchan, Akshaye Khanna, Kareena Kapoor, Rani Mukerji, Karan Johar, Manish Malhotra, Ranbir Kapoor, John Abraham, Vivek Oberoi, Rajkumar Hirani, Boman Irani and Anurag Kashyap in cameos. The film shows the journey of an aspiring actor who arrives in Mumbai to become a movie star. How he finds himself riding his fortune to becoming one, while struggling to sustain his relationships, forms the story.

Luck by Chance was released on 30 January 2009, and was a moderate commercial success. However, it received widespread critical acclaim, with major praise for its novel concept, story, screenplay, dialogues, and performances by the cast. At the 55th Filmfare Awards, Luck by Chance received 5 nominations, including Best Supporting Actor (Rishi) and Best Supporting Actress (Kapadia), and won Best Debut Director (Zoya, tying with Ayan Mukerji for Wake Up Sid).

== Plot ==
Vikram is an aspiring actor, who arrives in Mumbai to make a career in Bollywood. He starts going out with another struggling actor, Sona Mishra, after being introduced to her by an actor friend, Abhi. Sona has experienced Bollywood's casting couch, after sleeping with producer Satish for roles. Satish offers Sona small roles in regional movies, but has held out on his promise of giving her a big break in Bollywood.

While arguing with Satish one day, Sona hurriedly leaves when Satish's wife, Pinky, arrives. She pretends she was there to drop off her actor-'cousin', Vikram's photographs. Pinky picks up Vikram's portfolio, and forwards it to Romy Rolly's studio, from where Vikram receives a call to audition for Rolly's upcoming film. Vikram is thrilled at the prospect, realising after making the shortlist, that the part is of the film's male lead. He celebrates with Sona after winning the role, and leaves for an outdoor shoot.

At the location of the movie's shoot, Vikram quickly wins over Nikki, the female lead, and her mother, yesteryear actress, Neena. Neena has to return to Mumbai for a few days, leaving Nikki alone on-set with Vikram. She seduces him one night, and they have sex in Vikram's hotel room. Soon, the crew start gossiping about the film's lead pair hooking up. Sona hears the rumours and visits Vikram, but he declines to put her up in his hotel room, confirming the rumours are true.

After the crew's return to Mumbai, news leaks of upcoming star Vikram's two-way affair with actresses Nikki and Sona, while also flirting with yesteryear star, Neena. Nikki breaks up with Vikram, while Sona lashes out at the article's author for writing about her. The controversy helps Sona's career, as she wins roles on recurring television shows. Realising she will never make it as a movie actress, Sona makes peace with the fact that she makes enough money to support herself. Meanwhile, Rolly's film becomes a hit. Vikram gets flooded with offers, and attends parties to celebrate. At one such event, he runs into Bollywood superstar, Shah Rukh Khan. Khan warns Vikram about fame, and advises he remain close with his friends who knew him before he was famous. Vikram seeks out Sona to apologise. He offers to get back together, but Sona refuses. She is satisfied with her life, and does not want to play second-fiddle to Vikram's ambitions. He leaves, unaware that Sona was responsible for his first big break.

== Cast ==
- Farhan Akhtar as Vikram Jaisingh, a struggling actor who lands the lead role in Rolly's film
- Konkona Sen Sharma as Sona Mishra, a struggling actress and Vikram's girlfriend
- Rishi Kapoor as Rommy Rolly, one of Bollywood's biggest movie producers
- Dimple Kapadia as Neena Walia, a legendary yesteryear actress and Nikki's mother
- Juhi Chawla as Minty Rolly, producer Rolly's wife
- Sanjay Kapoor as Ranjit Rolly, movie director and producer Rolly's brother
- Isha Sharvani as Nikki Walia, daughter of Neena and female lead of Rolly's film
- Alyy Khan as Satish Chaudhary, producer of low-budget regional films
- Sheeba Chaddha as Pinky Chaudhary, Satish's wife
- Saurabh Shukla as Nand Kishore, acting school instructor
- Arjun Mathur as Abhimanyu 'Abhi' Gupta, Vikram's friend and struggling actor
- Sid Makkar as Sameer
- Pankaj Kalra as Raju
- Arvind Vaidya as Pandit
- Hrithik Roshan as Zafar Khan, Bollywood star who turns down Rolly's film

=== Guest appearances ===
- Aamir Khan
- Abhishek Bachchan
- Akshaye Khanna
- Anurag Kashyap
- Boman Irani
- Dia Mirza
- Javed Akhtar
- John Abraham
- Karan Johar
- Kareena Kapoor
- Mac Mohan
- Manish Acharya
- Manish Malhotra
- Rajkumar Hirani
- Ranbir Kapoor
- Rani Mukerji
- Ronit Roy
- Shabana Azmi
- Shah Rukh Khan
- Vivek Oberoi

== Production ==
=== Development ===
Zoya Akhtar said in an interview that she wrote the first draft 7 years ago while relaxing on Palolem beach in Goa. In an interview she said:

I hand wrote it and it was some ridiculous, epic-length when I came back and transcribed it on my laptop. The first film is the easiest to write because it's usually what the person knows their personal graphs, milieu and feelings. Luck By Chance is not about established actors, but those who are waiting for things to happen. Farhan's character is fresh off the boat, while Konkana's does bit roles, while looking for a big break.

The production team went through a host of names, like Madhuri Dixit, Saif Ali Khan, Kajol, Karisma Kapoor, Tabu, and Rani Mukerji. Having seen a lot of struggling actors come to Mumbai to make a living out of Bollywood, Zoya found it was easy to write the script for the film without any research. She was inspired to write this film by a lot of Bollywood-inspired movies like Guddi (1971), Rangeela (1995), and Om Shanti Om (2007).

Javed Akhtar wrote the dialogues for the film, incorporating, as Zoya puts it, his bizarre sense of humor. Farhan had to reportedly train to get six pack abs for the film. He was trained by Cheetah Yagnesh, who appeared on the film as the trainer of Farhan's character.

Filming faced a lot of problems, including the unpredictable Mumbai rains, which halted a song shoot with Hrithik Roshan. The rains washed out the entire set, and eventually the entire tent began to leak. Zoya was afraid that this would lead to short-circuit, and so all the lights had to be switched off.

According to Farhan, principal photography for the film was completed in October 2008.

=== Casting ===
Zoya Akhtar cast her brother Farhan to play the lead role after it was suggested to her by director Reema Kagti. She became convinced after seeing Farhan's performance in The Fakir of Venice. She said in an interview, "Farhan was the perfect choice for the role in Luck By Chance because he knows the industry in and out. He is smart and bright and both of us have been working together for years." Problems arose with the huge casting of the film. Zoya said, "I had to really think it out when I was deciding on these multiple actors that I wanted in the film. It was tough to decide especially because I wanted the right actors who could play themselves and still look believable as part of the film. Then there are other good actors like Boman Irani and Saurabh Shukla, who are playing characters in the film". Next to be cast were her parents, Javed Akhtar and Shabana Azmi, along with such veteran stars as Rishi Kapoor and Dimple Kapadia. Zoya said, "We could have had Shabana (Azmi) as the diva, but I needed a mainstream heroine. Only a leading lady would do. Dimple has played it edgy. She's all warm, soft sunshine and then there's a flip and she's hard, cold, steely". Isha Sharvani teams up again with Hrithik Roshan after appearing together in an ad. Juhi Chawla joined the cast playing Minty, the wife of producer Rommy Rolly.

=== Promotion ===
The producers decided to go with subtle promotion, letting audiences explore the film by themselves. The main trailer for the film was released in the last week of December 2008. It introduced the main characters and set the pace for what the plot was about. BigFlix, a part of Reliance BIG Entertainment Ltd., was given the task of promoting the film. The first bit of promotion came from the music wherein winners were given signed albums by Farhan Akhtar and Konkona Sen Sharma. They promoted the whole film across the nation in all 112 stores in 10 cities as well to the international audiences through its video-on-demand (VOD) site. The pre-release promotional activities included online marketing and publicity of the film's music videos, trailers, downloads, previews, preview shows, contests and continued with other promotional activities post-release like meet-and-greet events with the star cast at select cities.

A unique promotional campaign was launched by producers Farhan Akhtar and Ritesh Sidhwani called "Auto By Chance". They introduced 10 "Auto by Chance" three-wheelers in suburban Mumbai that would transport people for free to the destination of their choice in the suburbs. The promotion was run in conjunction with Big FM radio station and Godrej. One passenger would be interviewed live by an RJ and go on air with his experience of getting lucky and enjoying the free ride. The Indian gaming portal Zapak.com created a microsite for the movie with a game, "Luck by Chance - Lucky Break".

== Release ==
Luck by Chance was initially scheduled to be released 23 January 2009, alongside Raaz - The Mystery Continues, but was pushed to 30 January. Luck by Chance was released on 900 screens worldwide in 27 countries. Of this, over 700 screens were in India and the rest were in overseas markets such as the United States, Canada, UK, UAE, Australia, South Africa, and New Zealand. Luck By Chance's DVD was published by UTV Home Video. Luck By Chance's television premiere took place on Star Plus.

== Reception ==
=== Critical reception ===
Luck By Chance received widespread critical acclaim upon release. Anupama Chopra of NDTV wrote, "Zoya pokes fun at Bollywood but she does it with a great affection. There are some lovely little moments like the star daughter in a super short skin-tight outfit struggling to touch her producer's feet without splitting a seam. But what makes Luck By Chance compelling is the layers beneath the laughs. Though the first half wobbles precariously as the script struggles to find a momentum, but thankfully the narrative flows better in the latter half and culminates in a satisfying, bittersweet end". In the review at UAE Daily the United Arab Emirates reviewer said, "One of the prime reasons why Luck By Chance works is because [of] the writing...Right from the characters, to the individualistic scenes, to the way Zoya puts them in a sequence, Luck By Chance is easily one of the most cohesive scripts this side of the Atlantic. If Zoya's writing is superb, her execution of the written material deserves distinction marks". The Times of India said, "Luck By Chance highlights how the film industry give regards to everything else but the story when making a movie and ironically weaves a fascinating story using that paradox". Noyon Jyoti Parasara of AOL.in cited some drawbacks and said, "Luck By Chance provides you some smiles throughout the movie. However, it fails to leave you with the content smile that a feel-good movie ideally aims to do."

On the review aggregator website Rotten Tomatoes, 83% of 18 critics' reviews are positive, with an average rating of 6.8/10. Neil Genzlinger of The New York Times said, "It might seem as if Bollywood couldn't possibly satirize itself – the genre is already so over-the-top – but Zoya Akhtar manages the trick deftly in Luck by Chance...A fabulous circus-theme musical number pulls out all the stops, but a scene in which an acting teacher explains why Hindi stars have to be more talented than those in Hollywood is a subtle comic gem"...[I]t is Mr. Akhtar whose understated performance holds together this far-ranging, cameo-filled film. He manages to remain sympathetic even while wreaking romantic havoc". Frank Lovece of Film Journal International characterized it as, "The Player (1992) meets All About Eve (1950) in this seriocomic satire of the Bollywood film industry by a first-time director whose collaring of over a dozen major Hindi stars for cameos speaks well of its biting accuracy".

=== Box office ===
Luck by Chance had a slow start at the box office and registered 25% to 30% attendance. According to trade analyst and critic Joginder Tuteja, the occupancy at the theatres came down to 50%. Outside India, the film performed as per expectations.

In the US, Luck by Chance debuted at number 32. In its opening weekend, it collected $217,439 (approximately Rs. 1.06 crores) on 61 screens, a per-screen average of $3,556. In the UK, Luck By Chance debuted at number 21 and collected £73,822 (approximately Rs. 50.95 lacs) on 50 screens, with a per-screen average of £1,476. The film did very well in Australia and was a hit in India, grossing $3,914,500 at the box office. Worldwide, the film grossed $4,504,365.

== Awards ==
55th Filmfare Awards:

Won

- Best Debut Director – Zoya Akhtar (shared with Ayan Mukerji for Wake Up Sid)

Nominated

- Best Supporting Actor – Rishi Kapoor
- Best Supporting Actress – Dimple Kapadia
- Best Story – Zoya Akhtar
- Best Screenplay – Zoya Akhtar
