= Aparna Sen filmography =

Aparna Sen is an Indian filmmaker, screenwriter and actress who is known for her work in Bengali cinema. A leading actress of the late 1960s and 1970s she has received eight BFJA Awards, five for best actress, two for best supporting actress and one for lifetime achievement. She is the winner of nine National Film Awards and nine international film festival awards for her direction in films. She was awarded the Padma Shri, the fourth highest civilian award, by the government of India in 1987.

Sen made her debut in Mejo Bou (1955). She went on to establish herself as a leading actress of Bengali Cinema with the films Ekhane Pinjar (1971), Ekhoni (1971), Jay Jayanti (1971), Memshaheb (1972), Jiban Saikate (1972), Basanta Bilap (1973), Sonar Khancha (1973), Sujata (1974), Alor Thikana (1974), Kajallata (1975), Raag Anuraag (1975), Jana Aranya (1976), Ajasra Dhanyobad (1977), Proxy (1977), Mohonar Dike (1984), Ekanto Apon (1987), Swet Patharer Thala (1992). She also garnered critical acclaim for her work in Indira (1984), Kari Diye Kinlam (1989), Ek Din Achanak (1999), Mahaprithibi (1991), Unishe April (1995), Paromitar Ek Din (2000), Titli (2001), Antaheen (2009), Chatushkon (2014).

In addition to acting in films, Aparna Sen has also been directing films since 1981, starting with 36 Chowringhee Lane for which she won National Film Award (India) for Best Director. She went on to achieve further success in direction with films Paroma, Sati, Yugant, Paromitar Ek Din, Mr. and Mrs. Iyer, 15 Park Avenue, The Japanese Wife, Iti Mrinalini and Goynar Baksho. She won her second National Film Award as a director for Mr. and Mrs. Iyer.

== Films as an actress ==
| Year | Film | Role | Notes |
|---|---|---|---|
| 1955 | Mejo Bou | | |
| 1961 | Teen Kanya | Mrinmoyee | "Samapti" segment |
| 1965 | Akash Kusum | Monica | |
| 1965 | Baksa Badal | Minu | |
| 1968 | Hangsa-Mithun | | |
| 1969 | Vishwas | | |
| 1969 | The Guru | Ghazala | |
| 1969 | Aparichita | Sunita | |
| 1970 | Padmagolap | | |
| 1970 | Aranyer Din Ratri | Hari's former lover | |
| 1970 | Kalankita Nayak | | |
| 1970 | Bombay Talkie | Mala | |
| 1971 | Khunjey Berai | | |
| 1971 | Ekhoni | | |
| 1971 | Ekhane Pinjar | | |
| 1971 | Jay Jayanti | Jayanti | |
| 1972 | Nayikar Bhumikay | | |
| 1972 | Jiban Saikate | | |
| 1972 | Memsaheb | | |
| 1973 | Ali Baba | Marjina | |
| 1973 | Shesh Pristhay Dekhun | | |
| 1973 | Epaar Opaar | | |
| 1973 | Bilet Pherat | | |
| 1973 | Nakal Sona | | |
| 1973 | Sonar Khancha | | |
| 1973 | Kayahiner Kahini | Mallika | |
| 1973 | Basanta Bilap | Anuradha | |
| 1973 | Rater Rajanigandha | | |
| 1974 | Sujata | | |
| 1974 | Jadu Bansha | | |
| 1974 | Asati | | |
| 1974 | Alor Thikana | | |
| 1974 | Sagina | Secretary Vishaka Devi | |
| 1975 | Kajallata | | |
| 1975 | Chhutir Phande | | |
| 1975 | Raag Anurag | | |
| 1975 | Nishimrigaya | | |
| 1976 | Jana Aranya | Somnath's ex-girlfriend | |
| 1976 | Asamay | | |
| 1976 | Janeman | | |
| 1976 | Nidhiram Sardar | | |
| 1977 | Immaan Dharam | Shyamlee | |
| 1977 | Ajasra Dhanyabad | | |
| 1977 | Kotwal Saab | | |
| 1977 | Proxy | | |
| 1978 | Hullabaloo Ovrer Georgie and Bonnie's Pictures | Bonnie | |
| 1979 | Naukadubi | Kamala | |
| 1981 | Bandi Balaka | | |
| 1982 | Bijoyini | | |
| 1982 | Amrita Kumbher Sandhane | | |
| 1983 | Bishabriksha | Suryamukhi | |
| 1983 | Abhinoy Noy | | |
| 1983 | Arpita | | |
| 1983 | Indira | Indira | |
| 1984 | Paroma | Sheela | |
| 1984 | Pikoo | | |
| 1984 | Mohanar Dike | | |
| 1985 | Neelkantha | | |
| 1986 | Shyam Saheb | | |
| 1987 | Debika | | |
| 1987 | Ekanta Apan | | |
| 1987 | Jar Jey Priyo | | |
| 1989 | Kari Diye Kinlam | | |
| 1990 | Ek Din Achanak | Professor's student | |
| 1990 | Sankranti | | |
| 1991 | Mahaprithibi | Daughter-in-law | |
| 1992 | Shwet Patharer Thala | Bandana | |
| 1992 | Ananya | | |
| 1994 | Amodini | Muslim | |
| 1996 | Unishe April | Sarojini | |
| 1996 | Abhishapta Prem | | |
| 2000 | Paromitar Ek Din | Sanaka | |
| 2002 | Titli | Urmila | |
| 2009 | Antaheen | Paromita | |
| 2011 | Iti Mrinalini | Old Mrinalini Mitra aka Mili | |
| 2014 | Chotushkone | Trina Sen | |
| 2018 | Ek Je Chhilo Raja | Anupama Basu | |
| 2019 | Basu Poribar | Mandira Basu | |
| 2019 | Bohomaan | Madhuri | |
| 2024 | Parama: A Journey with Aparna Sen | Herself as Aparna Sen | |
| 2025 | Ei Raat Tomar Amaar | Jayita | |

== Writer and director ==
| Year | Film | Language | Notes |
|---|---|---|---|
| 1981 | 36 Chowringhee Lane | English, Bengali | Won, National Film Award for Best Direction; Won, National Film Award for Best Feature Film in English |
| 1985 | Paroma | Bengali | Won, National Film Award for Best Feature Film in Bengali Won, BFJA Award for Best Director. |
| 1989 | Sati | Bengali | Released: 23 November 1989 |
| 1989 | Picnic | Bengali | TV movie |
| 1995 | Yugant | Bengali | Won, National Film Award for Best Feature Film in Bengali |
| 2000 | Paromitar Ek Din | Bengali | Won, National Film Award for Best Feature Film in Bengali, Won, Bombay International Film Festival FIPRESCI Prize , Won, Karlovy Vary International Film Festival Award of Ecumenical Jury – Special Mention, Nominee, Crystal Globe, Won, Kalakar Awards for Best Director. |
| 2002 | Mr. and Mrs. Iyer | English | Won, National Film Award for Best Direction; Won, Nargis Dutt Award for Best Feature Film on National Integration; Won, National Film Award for Best Screenplay |
| 2005 | 15 Park Avenue | English | Won, National Film Award for Best Feature Film in English |
| 2010 | The Japanese Wife | English, Bengali, Japanese | Released: 9 April 2010 |
| 2011 | Iti Mrinalini | Bengali | Won-Kalakar Awards-Best Director Award |
| 2013 | Goynar Baksho | Bengali | Nominated, Filmfare Awards East for Best Director |
| 2015 | Saari Raat | Hindi | Premiered at the London Film Festival, 2015 |
| 2015 | Arshinagar | Bengali | Released: 25 December 2015 |
| 2017 | Sonata | English and Hindi | Released: 21 April 2017 |
| 2019 | Ghawre Bairey Aaj | Bengali | Released: 15 November 2019 |
| 2021 | The Rapist | Hindi | Won, Kim Jiseok award at 26th Busan International Film Festival and Best director award at Indian Film Festival of Melbourne in 2022. |
