= Parama: A Journey with Aparna Sen =

2024 Indian documentary film

- Theatrical release poster
- Directed by: Suman Ghosh
- Written by: Suman Ghosh
- Starring: Aparna Sen; Konkona Sen; Shabana Azmi; Rahul Bose; Anjan Dutt
- Cinematography: Soumik Haldar
- Edited by: Sankha
- Music by: Debojyoti Mishra
- Release dates: 27 January 2024 (International Film Festival Rotterdam); 3 January 2025 (India)
- Running time: 80 minutes
- Country: India
- Languages: Bengali; Hindi; English

Parama: A Journey with Aparna Sen is a 2024 Indian documentary film directed by Suman Ghosh. It chronicles the career and life of filmmaker, actor, and cultural figure Aparna Sen, known for her contributions to Indian parallel cinema through films like 36 Chowringhee Lane (1981) and Parama (1985). The documentary premiered at the International Film Festival Rotterdam on 27 January 2024, in the Cinema Regained strand. It was released theatrically in India on 3 January 2025.

== Synopsis ==
The film follows Aparna Sen as she revisits locations where she filmed 36 Chowringhee Lane, Parama, and Paromitar Ek Din, guided by director Suman Ghosh. Sen discusses her feminist themes and political views, including critiques of right-wing politics in Mr. and Mrs. Iyer. It includes interviews with collaborators and archival footage from her films, highlighting her role as editor of the Bengali magazine Sananda.

== Cast ==
- Aparna Sen
- Konkona Sen
- Shabana Azmi
- Rahul Bose
- Anjan Dutt
- Goutam Ghose

== Production ==
Suman Ghosh, a National Award-winning filmmaker, began the project in 2022 after interviewing Sen in Santiniketan, focusing on her career as a director, actor, and journalist. Structured as a “road movie,” it explores themes like feminism in Parama. Archival footage for 36 Chowringhee Lane was sourced through negotiations with the National Film Development Corporation (NFDC). Shot by Soumik Haldar, edited by Sankha, and scored by Debojyoti Mishra, the film faced distribution challenges but gained screenings due to Sen’s prominence.

== Reception ==
The documentary was praised for its portrayal of Aparna Sen. Shubhra Gupta of The Indian Express called it “a lively portrait of an artiste,” noting its use of location revisits in Kolkata. Saibal Chatterjee of NDTV gave it 3.5 out of 5 stars, calling it “essential viewing” for its balanced narrative. Anandabazar Patrika lauded its exploration of Sen’s personal complexities, questioning her reliance on male companionship. Subhash K Jha of Times Now described it as a “fascinating voyage” through Sen’s life and films, praising its intimate storytelling.

== Distribution and Exhibition ==
Screened at festivals in Houston, New York, Vienna, Stuttgart, London, and Kolkata, the film ran at PVR Inox, a rarity for documentaries. Ghosh planned an OTT release after the festival circuit.
