= Shabana Azmi filmography =

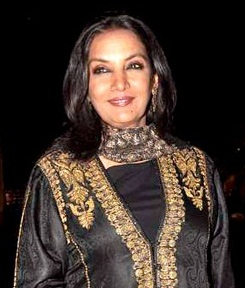
Azmi at 7th Chevrolet Apsara Film and Television Producers Guild Awards

Since her first film in 1974, Shabana Azmi has appeared in over 100 projects. She has received many national awards.

== Films ==
Year	Film	Role	Notes
1974	Parinay	Rekha	
1974	Faslah	Asha	
1974	Ankur	Laxmi	Winner, National Film Award for Best Actress
1974	Ishq Ishq Ishq	Pammy	
1975	Nishant	Sushila	
1976	Kadambari	Chetna	
1976	Shaque	Meena Joshi	
1976	Fakira	Neeta/Geeta	
1977	Shatranj Ke Khiladi	Khurshid	
1977	Adha Din Adhi Raat	Dr. Radha	
1977	Amar Akbar Anthony	Laxmi	
1977	Chor Sipahee	Priya	
1977	Ek Hi Raasta	Ketki	
1977	Hira Aur Patthar	Gauri	
1977	Jallian Wala Bagh		
1977	Kanneshwara Rama	Malli	Kannada film
1977	Karm	Neelam	
1977	Khel Khilari Ka	Rachna	
1977	Kissa Kursi Ka	Janata	
1977	Parvarish	Shabu	
1977	Swami	Saudamini	Winner, Filmfare Best Actress Award
1977	Vishwasghaat	Seema	
1978	Atithee	Leela/Julie	
1978	Devata	Mary/Lily (Note: She played dual roles)	
1978	Khoon Ki Pukaar	Shano	
1978	Swarg Narak	Geeta Vinod	
1978	Toote Khilone		
1979	Junoon	Firdaus	
1979	Lahu Ke Do Rang	Roma	
1979	Amar Deep	Radha	
1979	Bagula Bhagat		
1979	Jeena Yahan		
1980	Apne Paraye	Chandranath's wife	
1980	Thodisi Bewafaii	Neema	
1980	Sparsh	Kavita	
1980	Albert Pinto Ko Gussa Kyon Ata Hai	Stella	
1980	Ek Baar Kaho	Aarti Mathur	
1980	Jwalamukhi	Kiran	
1980	Yeh Kaisa Insaaf	Madhu	
1981	Shama	Shama	
1981	Hum Paanch	Sundariya	
1981	Ek Hi Bhool	Meenakshi	Special appearance
1981	Sameera		
1982	Arth	Pooja Malhotra	Winner, National Film Award for Best Actress and Filmfare Best Actress Award
1982	Suraag	Sunita/Bela	
1982	Raaste Pyar Ke	Shyama	
1982	Anokha Bandhan	Annapurna	
1982	Ashanti	Kamini	
1982	Log Kya Kahenge	Roma	
1982	Namkeen	Mitthu	
1982	Yeh Nazdeekiyan	Shobna	
1983	Doosri Dulhan	Chanda	
1983	Avtaar	Radha Krishen	
1983	Mandi	Rukmini Bai	
1983	Masoom	Indu Malhotra	
1983	Sweekar Kiya Maine	Gopika	
1983	Pyaasi Aankhen		
1984	Bhavna	Bhavna Saxena	Winner, Filmfare Best Actress Award
1984	Gangvaa	Jamna	
1984	Khandhar	Jamini	Winner, National Film Award for Best Actress
1984	Lorie	Geeta Malhotra	
1984	Aaj Ka M.L.A. Ram Avtar	Sushma	
1984	Hum Rahe Na Hum	Mohini Sahani	
1984	Kaamyab	Sita	
1984	Kamla	Sarita Jadhav	
1984	Paar	Rama	Winner, National Film Award for Best Actress
1984	Ram Tera Desh	Advocate	Special appearance
1984	Yaadon Ki Zanjeer		Delayed release
1985	Rahi Badal Gaye	Bhavna	
1986	Nasihat	Indrani	
1986	Khamosh	Azmi	
1986	Genesis	The Woman	
1986	Shart	Kiran Dutt	
1986	Anjuman	Anjuman	
1986	Ek Pal	Priyam	
1986	Samay Ki Dharaa	Madhvi	
1987	Itihaas	Sunaina	
1987	Susman	Gauramma	
1988	Madame Sousatzka	Sushila Sen	
1988	Mardon Wali Baat	Seema	
1988	Ek Aadmi		
1988	Libaas	Seema	Not released commercially
1988	La Nuit Bengali	Indira Sen	
1988	Pestonjee	Jeroo	
1989	Ek Din Achanak	Neeta	
1989	Oonch Neech Beech	Tulsi	Delayed release
1989	Rakhwala	Journalist Kiran	
1989	Main Azaad Hoon	Subhashni Saigal	
1989	Sati	Uma	
1990	Amba	Amba	
1990	Disha	Hansa Sarpat	
1990	Muqaddar Ka Badshaah	Advocate Sharda Singh	
1991	Jhoothi Shaan	Krishna	
1991	Antarnaad		
1991	Ek Doctor Ki Maut	Seema	
1991	Fateh	Shabana	
1992	City of Joy	Kamla Pal	
1992	Adharm	Mamta Verma	
1992	Dharavi	Kumud	
1992	Immaculate Conception	Samira	
1993	Son of the Pink Panther	Queen	
1993	In Custody	Imtiaz Begum	
1994	Patang	Jitni	
1995	Daughters of This Century	Kadambini	
1996	Fire	Radha	
1997	Mrityudand	Chandravati	
1997	Saaz	Bansi	
1998	Earth	Narrator	Voice only
1998	Side Streets	Chandra Bipin Raj	
1998	Bada Din	Lilian	
1999	Godmother	Rambhi	Winner, National Film Award for Best Actress
2000	Gaja Gamini	Premchand's Nirmala	Guest appearance
2000	Hari-Bhari: Fertility	Ghazala	
2002	Makdee	The witch	
2002	Meghla Akash	Virology Doctor	Special appearance (Bangladeshi Bengali film)
2003	Tehzeeb	Rukhsana Jamal	
2004	Morning Raga	Swarnlatha	
2005	15 Park Avenue	Anju Mathur	
2005	Waterborne	Heera Bhatti	
2006	Umrao Jaan	Khanum Sahib	
2007	Positive	Mrs.Soni	Short film
2007	Dus Kahaniyaan		(Anthology film) story Rice Plate
2007	Om Shanti Om	Herself	Special appearance in song, Deewangi Deewangi
2007	Loins of Punjab Presents	Rrita Kapoor	
2007	Honeymoon Travels Pvt. Ltd.	Nahid	
2008	Sorry Bhai!	Mother Gayatri	
2009	Luck by Chance	Herself	Cameo
2010	It's a Wonderful Afterlife	Mrs Sethi	
2011	A Decent Arrangement	Preeti Mehta	
2012	Midnight's Children	Naseem	
2013	Matru Ki Bijlee Ka Mandola	Chaudhary Devi	
2013	The Reluctant Fundamentalist	Ammi	
2015	Jazbaa	Garima	
2016	Neerja	Rama Bhanot	Winner, Filmfare Award for Best Supporting Actress
2016	Chalk n Duster	Teacher Vidya	
2017	Sonata	Bengali Widow	
2017	Signature Move	Parveen	
2017	The Wishing Tree	Tree Goddess	
2017	The Black Prince	Maharani Jind Kaur	
2020	Kaali Khuhi	Satya Maasi	Netflix film
2022	What's Love Got to Do with It?	Aisha Khan	
2023	Rocky Aur Rani Kii Prem Kahaani	Jamini Chatterjee	Winner, Filmfare Award for Best Supporting Actress
2023	Ghoomer	Anina's grandmother	
2026	Saugaat	Anu/Lakshmi	delayed release
2026	Batwara 1947	Mai	
2026	Awarapan 2	Nafisa Nawaz	

== Television ==
Year	Title	Role	Notes
1989	Picnic	Mother	Television film
2006	Banglatown Banquet	Sofia	British television film
2013–2016	24	Abhilasha Grewal	
2016	Amma	Zeenat Sheikh	
2018	Next of Kin	Mrs Shirani	British series
2018	The Good Karma Hospital	Anila	British series
2019	Rangoli	Host/presenter	Kaifi Azmi special episode
2021	The Empire	Aisan Daulat Begum	
2022–2024	Halo	Admiral Margaret Paragonsky	American television series
2025	Dabba Cartel	Sheila	

== Short films ==
Year	Title	Role	Notes
2018	Aunty Ji	Parveen aunty	
2021	Sheer Qorma	Raziya Khan	
