= Suman Ghosh (director) =

Bengali director

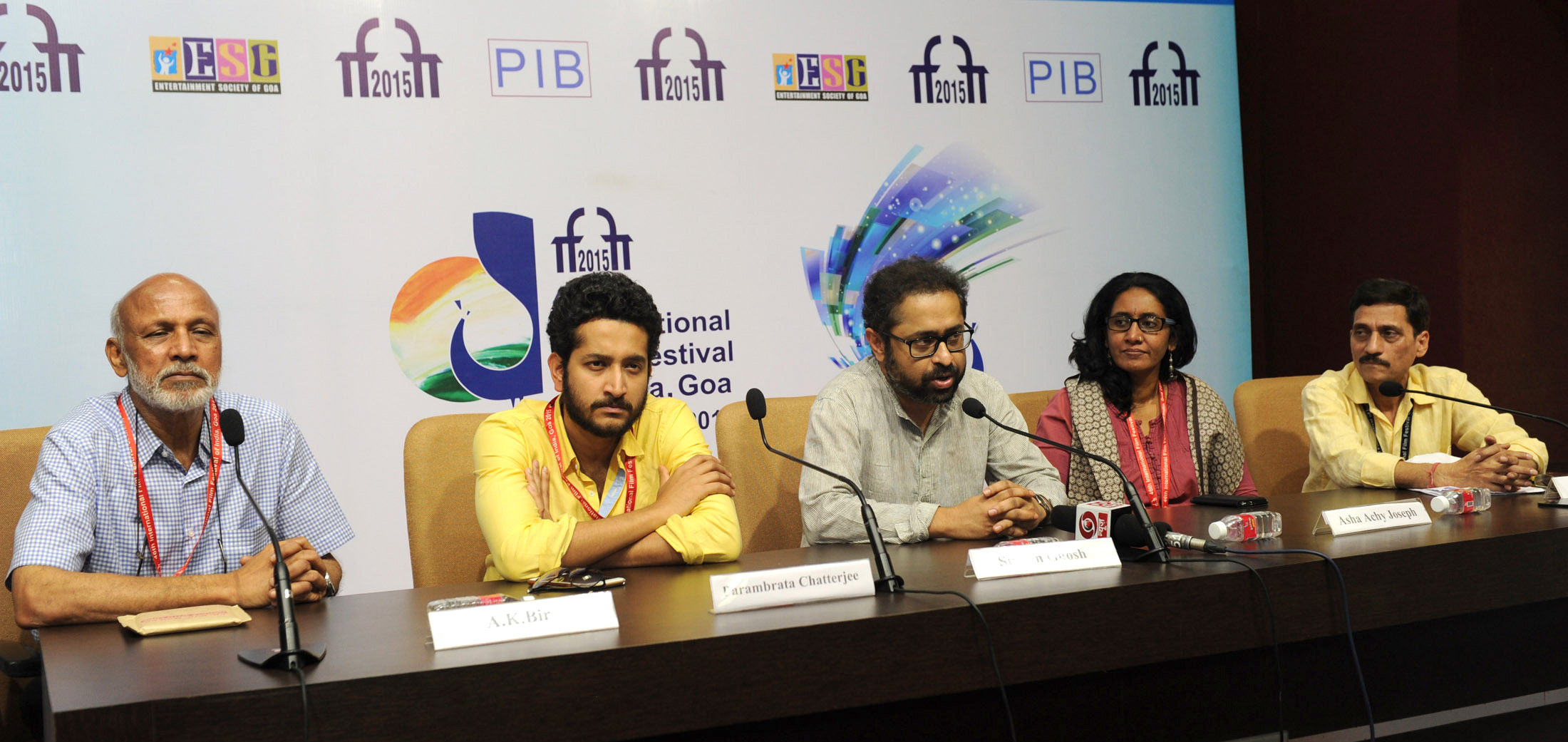
- Suman Ghosh, IFFI (2015)
- Born: 1972 (age 53–54)

Academic background
- Education: Calcutta University; Delhi University; Cornell University

Academic work
- Discipline: Professor, economist, film director
- Institutions: Florida Atlantic University
- Website: Information at IDEAS / RePEc

Suman Ghosh (born 1972) is a film director, and a professor of economics at Florida Atlantic University. Suman's notable films include Podokkhep (2006), Nobel Chor (2012), Kadambari (2015 film), Kabuliwala (2023 film)

== Education ==
Suman Ghosh gained his B.Sc. in economics from Presidency College, Calcutta and his M.A. in economics from the Delhi School of Economics. He completed his Ph.D. in economics at Cornell University in 2002. His research interests are public economics, personnel economics, and development economics.

== Career ==
Suman Ghosh is a National Award-winning Indian filmmaker who has made Eleven feature films and two documentary film. He had his film training at Cornell University in New York. His first feature film Footsteps, starring Soumitra Chatterjee and Nandita Das, won 2 National Awards in 2008. It was shown at numerous film festivals, including Vancouver, Karlovy Vary and IAAC New York. His second feature film Dwando, also starring Soumitra Chatterjee, was a part of the Indian Panorama at IFFI Goa in 2009. His next feature film Nobel Thief, starring the Indian megastar Mithun Chakraborty, was world premiered at the Busan IFF and was an official selection at the BFI, London Film festival. The film received the "Best Indian Film" award at the Bengaluru International Film Festival in 2012. His latest feature film Shyamal Uncle Turns off the Lights has had a warm reception from critics and audiences all over the world. It was world premiered at the Busan Film Festival in South Korea and had its North American Premiere at the MoMA, NY. It has been shown at a number of international film festivals, including BUSAN IFF, Mumbai FF, Santa Barbara IFF, ReelWorld Film Festival (Toronto), Delhi 010 Digital Film Festival, Freiburger Film Forum (Germany), Indian Film Festival in Stuttgart, Germany and 10th Green Film Festival (Seoul). It won the "Outstanding International Feature Award" at the ReelWorld Film festival in Toronto. The film, based on a true incident, traces the journey of Shyamal Uncle, an eighty-year-old retiree, as he wades through an apathetic system with a seemingly trivial goal – turn off the street lights near his home which are left on even during the day. Colin Burrows is the executive producer and it is being distributed in North America by Global Film Initiative.

Vincent Malausa at Cahiers du Cinéma calls it "extraordinary magic …..leads to one of the most beautiful happy endings we have ever seen" and "The impeccable rhythm and the art with which the director deals with new twists….invite the audience to understand that a true epic is told in the small adventure." Another reviewer notes that "With echoes of Kurosawa’s ‘Ikiru,’ the great 1952 Japanese film about a low level bureaucrat who gets a playground for a neighborhood, and solidly in the tradition of the Indian realism of Satyajit Ray—Pather Panchali and the Apu Trilogy, Suman Ghosh, the writer and director, establishes himself as an important filmmaker in the 21st century."

His next film Kadambari, starring Konkona Sen Sharma and Parambrata Chatterjee, is based on the life of Rabindranath Tagore and his controversial relationship with his sister-in-law Kadambari Devi. Kadambari was a major box office success and was also screened at several film festivals all over the world. It won the Best Film and the Best Actress award for Konkona Sensharma at the Washington DC South Asian Film Festival in 2015. His next released film Peace Haven, starring Soumitra Chatterjee, released in early 2016. The film had its world premier at Busan International Film Festival in Oct 2015 and was a selection at MAMI, Mumbai and New York Indian Film Festival in 2016. He has completed his next feature film in English titled Mi Amor, which was entirely shot in the US. It stars Parambrata Chatterjee and Raima Sen and is scheduled to release in 2017. His most recent film Basu Poribaar (The Bose Family), starring Soumitra Chatterjee, Aparna Sen, Rituparna Sengupta, Jishu Sengupta, Sashwata Chatterjee, Sudipta Chakraborty and others, is releasing soon. He made his foray into Hindi films with Aadhaar. The film is produced by Drishyam Films and Reliance. The film is awaiting a theatrical release. His next film is "Searching for Happiness..." which world premiered at the Miami International Film Festival in March 2021. It is playing in film festivals currently and is scheduled to release in India this year. It stars 4 year old Shahida Neera and Sudipta Chakraborty

== Filmography ==
- Podokkhep (2006)
- Dwando (2009)
- Nobel Chor (2012)
- Shyamal Uncle Turns off the Lights (2013)
- Kadambari (2015)
- Peace Haven (2016)
- Mi Amor (2017)
- The Argumentative Indian (2017) [Documentary]
- Basu Poribar (2018)
- Aadhaar (2019)
- Searching for Happiness... (2021)
- Kabuliwala (2023)
- Parama: A Journey with Aparna Sen (2024) [Documentary]
- The Scavenger of Dreams (2024), world premiere at BIFF on 5 October.
- Puratawn (2025)
- Familywala (2027)

== Awards ==
- National Award for Best Feature Film in Bengali for the film Podokkhep (2008)
- Official Selected at Busan International Film Festival for Nobel Chor, 2011
- Best Indian Film Award at Bengaluru Film Festival for the film Nobel Chor (2012)
- Best International Film Award at Reel World Film Festival Toronto Shyamal Uncle Turns off the Lights (2012)
- Best Film Award at Washington DC South Asian Film Festival for the film Kadambari (2015)
- Official Selected at kolkata International Film festival for Kadambari, 2014
- Best Film Award (Critics Choice) at the Hyderabad Bengali Film Festival for the film Peace Haven (2017)
- Best Film award at Indian Film Festival of Houston for Puratwan, 2025
- Best Film award at the Washington DC South Asian Film Festival for Puratwan, 2024
- Official selection at MAMI Mumbai Film Festival 2024 for Puratwan, 2024

== See also ==
Tapan Sinha
