= Iti Mrinalini =

- Theatrical release poster
- Directed by: Aparna Sen
- Written by: Aparna Sen; Ranjan Ghosh
- Produced by: Shrikant Mohta; Mahendra Soni
- Starring: Konkona Sen Sharma; Aparna Sen; Rajat Kapoor; Priyanshu Chatterjee; Kaushik Sen
- Cinematography: Somak Mukherjee
- Edited by: Rabiranjan Moitra
- Music by: Debojyoti Mishra
- Distributed by: Shree Venkatesh Films
- Release dates: 27 October 2010 (MAMI International Film Festival); 29 July 2011 (India)
- Running time: 128 minutes
- Country: India
- Language: Bengali

Iti Mrinalini (Bengali: ইতি মৃণালিনী English: Yours, Mrinalini; English: An Unfinished Letter) is a 2011 Indian drama film directed by Bengali filmmaker Aparna Sen. Sen collaborated with Ranjan Ghosh to write both the story and the screenplay. The film was produced by Shrikant Mohta and Mahendra Soni of Shree Venkatesh Films Pvt Ltd. Some critics consider it to be among her best works, ranking with Mr. and Mrs. Iyer and 36 Chowringhee Lane.

This was the first Bengali film Sen directed after a gap of more than a decade. Her previous film was Paromitar Ek Din, in 2000. Iti Mrinalini is viewed as the director's first mainstream venture. It focuses on the life of an aging Bengali star actress of yesteryear (Mrinalini), who looks back at her life. Aparna Sen plays the current-day Mrinalini while her daughter Konkona Sen Sharma portrays Mrinalini's younger self. The film also stars Rajat Kapoor, Priyanshu Chatterjee, Kaushik Sen, Locket Chatterjee and German actor Suzanne Bernert in supporting roles. The entire cast, except for Konkona, is new to Aparna Sen films.

This was the first time Sen had collaborated with a scriptwriter, and the first film by Sen to be nationally released in Hindi simultaneously with the Bengali version. It is also the first time Sen and her daughter have played the same character.

== Plot ==
Mrinalini, an ageing actress, writes a suicide note. As a performer, the first lesson she learned was timing – the perfect moment for making an entrance or an exit on stage. On the stage of life, her entrance was outside her control, but she plans to choose her exit.

Before taking the sleeping pills she decided to destroy many of her personal belongings in case they fall into the hands of the press. She was a focus of media attention all her life and wished to be spared of this at the time of her death.

As she looks through the relics from her past, she remembers incidents that she had forgotten or had suppressed. Through these memories, she relives her love life, friendships and betrayals, successes and failures, accidents and awards.

As Mrinalini relives her past, night gradually turns to dawn. An azaan (Islamic call to prayer) starts up in the distance. Slowly, early morning light fills the room. The moment has passed and the death she had wished for so intensely no longer seems a priority. Her German Shepherd comes and rubs its head on its mistress's feet and asks to be let out. Mrinalini tears up the suicide note and takes her dog out for a walk. On the street, she meets morning walkers, joggers, and a group of school children.

A young man runs past her. He seems to be escaping from something. Mrinalini thinks that she recognizes him; he resembles her first boyfriend, from her college days. Maybe he's a thief, or a gangster. Then a gunshot is heard. Everyone on the street is startled. Mrinalini stands still, shocked. The young man who resembled her first love checks himself. He is safe, but Mrinalini has been hit in the back. He runs off as she collapses on the ground.

== Cast ==
- Aparna Sen as the Mrinalini Mitra
  - Konkona Sen Sharma as the younger Mrinalini Mitra
- Priyanshu Chatterjee as Imtiaz Chowdhury
- Rajat Kapoor as Siddhartha Sarkar
- Kaushik Sen as Chintan Nair
- Saheb Bhattacharjee as Abhijeet Mukherjee
- Locket Chatterjee as Maithili Sarkar
- Srijit Mukherji as Ranajoy Mitra
- Suzanne Bernert as Julia Campbell
- Gargi Roychowdhury as Sumitra Debi
- Ananya Chatterjee as Hiya Majumdar
- Dulal Lahiri as Prasad Sen
- Rita Koiral as Moti
- Tritee Basu as Toddler Shona
- Poonam Basak as Mrinalini's Roommate
- Avrajit Chakraborty as Mrinalini's friend

== Production ==
=== Pre-production ===
This is Sen's first collaboration with Shree Venkatesh Films Pvt Ltd, the makers of Chokher Bali and Raincoat. Pre-production started in the second week of April 2009 with ideation. Scripting started by the end of April.

The screenplay of Iti Mrinalini was an assignment in the screenwriting syllabus at the Mumbai-based film school Whistling Woods International. This marked the first time that a screenplay emerging from an Indian film institute had actually been filmed. In a Master Class on Cinema held on Fox History and Entertainment Channel, Sen commented that she had never collaborated with any film writer before the screenplay for Iti Mrinalini. First-time screenwriter Ranjan Ghosh, an alumnus of Whistling Woods International, wrote the story and the screenplay along with Sen, based on an original story idea Sen gave him. Ghosh was Sen's first co-author since she began her prolific directing career with 36 Chowringhee Lane in 1981. The first draft of the screenplay of Iti Mrinalini was ready by the end of July 2009. The second and third drafts were completed by August and September, respectively

Somak Mukherjee acted as cinematographer, in place of Shirsha Roy who was unable to participate due to scheduling problems. Location scouting was carried out in Calcutta and Konark in the month of August.

As she did for her earlier films, Sen arranged a grueling acting workshop for the cast, conducted by Sohag Sen. The Calcutta chapter of the workshop lasted for three weeks, with Konkona Sen Sharma. The Mumbai chapter ran for another ten days, with Rajat Kapoor and Priyanshu Chatterjee.

Extensive pre-production meets were held regularly at Sen's home throughout the months of August and September. Production design of this film was by Sen and her directorial assistants. Scriptwriter Ranjan Ghosh acted as assistant director and took on the task of creating Mrinalini's memorabilia with help from the art department. Sabarni Das, Sen's longtime junior colleague at the Bengali-language women's magazine Sananda, designed the costumes. Das also helped in the art direction.

=== Production/Principal photography ===
The production of the film started on 6 October 2009.

One of the cult poems by Bengali writer Sunil Gangopadhyay, Smritir Shohor, was turned into a song for the film. This is the first time a poem by Gangopadhyay's poems has been in a film. Music director Debojyoti Mishra wrote the score.

Iti Mrinalini was shot in 38 locations in just 33 days. The shoot covered areas around Calcutta including the Vidyasagar Setu, the Howrah Bridge, Baghbazar Ghat, College Street, Favourite Cabin, Calcutta Greens, Science City, Alipore Zoo, New Market, Priya Cinema, Ganga Kutir, and a Silver Spring apartment. The outdoor scenes were shot in Konark in a week, in the latter half of October.

The Calcutta Movieton studio at Tollygunge’s 28A Chandi Ghosh Road reopened after 25 years for Iti Mrinalini. The studio was once owned by ex-star Kanan Devi, who sold it to businessman Jagdish Bagri in 1985. Bagri commented "I had no intention to run a studio back then but now Tollywood is big". Producer Shree Venkatesh Films hired two floors for the shoot.

=== Post-production ===
The first two cuts of the film were completed by the end of November 2009 and by mid-December 2009 respectively. The final cut, with a duration of 128 minutes, was completed in January 2010.

Dubbing was held in Calcutta in December and in Mumbai from January to March 2010. Sound design and the final mix-down was completed in 'Maximum City' in September.

== Release ==
Iti Mrinalini's domestic premiere was in the 'Indian Frame' section at the 12th MAMI International Film Festival 2010, held in Mumbai on 27 October 2010. Its world premiere was at the Cairo International Film Festival on 30 November 2010. The film opened the River to River. Florence Indian Film Festival on 3 December 2010, which was also its European premiere. It played to sold-out audiences at the Dubai International Film Festival, and was given a standing ovation at the 8th Edition of the Chennai International Film Festival on 23 December 2010.

The prestigious Slamdance Film Festival presented Iti Mrinalini at the 9th Annual Indian Film Festival of Los Angeles, on 14 April 2011, the film's USA premiere. It was selected as the Centerpiece Film at the 11th Annual edition of the IAAC's New York Indian Film Festival in May 2011 in Manhattan, and was shown at the Silk Screen Asian American Film Festival in May 2011 in Pittsburgh, Pennsylvania and the 14th Shanghai International Film Festival in June 2011.

The film's commercial release in India was on 29 July 2011, followed by a worldwide release on 31 July 2011.

== Reception ==
The Hollywood Reporter called Iti Mrinalini "[a]n addicting shot of melodrama" with "anxious beautiful women" and "a sense that society, an entirely alien force outside those nighttime windows, is conspiring to ruin lives and despoil love".

The Telegraph (Calcutta) commented that "[t]he film transcends its regional mould and presents Bengalis as part of a bigger global existence... This is a new-generation film which doesn’t need a hip youngster to make it contemporary".

The Indian Express wrote that "The film ends abruptly on a tragic, pessimistic, almost melodramatic note that is unlike Aparna Sen. Sen's minute eye for detail is scattered through the film, as are myriad characters of different colours who dot her life from her youth in the 1970s to the present time".

Anandabazar Patrika rated the film 8.5/10, calling it "Aparna's most mature outing till date, and a marked departure from her usual style of film-making".

== Themes ==
The film examines the uncertainty of life, suggesting that nothing is under our control no matter how hard we try. The film also explores different forms of love: romantic love, domestic happiness, platonic love, and love that results from loneliness and seclusion.

== Soundtrack ==
The soundtrack has music composed by Debojyoti Mishra, with lyrics by Sunil Gangopadhyay, Srijit Mukherjee and Rabindranath Tagore. The music was released on 28 March 2011.

Iti Mrinalini
- Soundtrack album cover

Soundtrack album by Debojyoti Mishra
- Released: 28 March 2011
- Genre: Film soundtrack
- Language: Bengali
- Label: SVF
- Producers: Shrikant Mohta; Mahendra Soni

No.	Title	Lyrics	Performer(s)	Length
1.	"Smritir Sahor" (Part 1)	Sunil Gangopadhyay	Srikanto Acharya, Priyam Mukherjee & Sourish Bhattacharya
2.	"Ajana Kono Galpo Bole"	Srijit Mukherjee	Shreya Ghoshal
3.	"Mone Holo Jeno Antabihin"	Rabindranath Tagore	Sudeshna Chatterjee
4.	"Bishe Bishe Nil" (Female)	Srijit Mukherjee	Shreya Ghoshal
5.	"Smritir Sahor" (Part 2)	Sunil Gangopadhyay	Aparna Sen, Srikanto Acharya, Priyam Mukherjee & Sourish Bhattacharya
6.	"Amar Mukti Aloye Aloye"	Rabindranath Tagore	Sudeshna Chatterjee
7.	"Bishe Bishe Nil" ((Male))	Srijit Mukherjee	Bonnie Chakraborty
8.	"Amake Tan Mare"

== Awards ==
- New York Indian Film Festival (Best Director) - Aparna Sen
- New York Indian Film Festival (Best Actress) - Konkona Sen Sharma
