= Nobel Chor =

- Promotional poster of Nobel Chor
- Directed by: Suman Ghosh
- Written by: Suman Ghosh
- Produced by: Ashwani Sharma
- Starring: Mithun Chakraborty; Soumitra Chatterjee; Roopa Ganguly; Saswata Chatterjee; Sankar Debnath; Sudipta Chakraborty; Arindam Sil; Harsh Chhaya
- Cinematography: Barun Mukherjee
- Music by: Bickram Ghosh
- Release date: 20 February 2012
- Running time: 100 minutes
- Country: India
- Language: Bengali

Nobel Chor (Bengali: নোবেল চোর) (transl. Nobel Thief) is a 2012 Bengali-language Indian film directed by Suman Ghosh, starring Mithun Chakraborty, Soumitra Chatterjee, Roopa Ganguly and Saswata Chatterjee. The film was officially selected for the BFI London Film Festival.

== Plot ==
The first Asian Nobel Laureate, Rabindranath Tagore, remains a revered cultural icon in India. On 24 March 2004, his Nobel medal was stolen from his residence, which had been converted into a museum at Shantiniketan in Bengal. The theft sparked nationwide outrage and prompted an extensive search for the culprit. However, the medal was never recovered, and the Central Bureau of Investigation (CBI) closed the case in 2010.

Against this backdrop, Nobel Chor (The Nobel Thief) presents a fictional account of Bhanu, a poor farmer who becomes inadvertently involved in the theft. Hoping to improve his own circumstances and those of his impoverished village, he sets off for the City of Joy, Kolkata, intending to return or sell the medal.

Bhanu becomes a source of hope for his entire village. In the city, he encounters crooks, eccentric memorabilia collectors and opportunistic entrepreneurs seeking to exploit him. Amid these encounters, he remains driven by his simple ambition to secure a better future for his son and improve the living conditions of his fellow villagers.

Through Bhanu's journey, the film examines contemporary India, focusing on the encroachment of globalisation, the divide between rural and urban life, and the condition of the country's villages. It also explores the continuing relevance of Tagore's philosophy in modern Indian society.

== Cast ==
- Mithun Chakraborty as Bhanu
- Soumitra Chatterjee as Master Moshai
- Roopa Ganguly as Diya
- Saswata Chatterjee as Hori
- Soma Banerjee as Bhanu's wife
- Sankar Debnath as Manmatho Pagla
- Sudipta Chakraborty as Monu
- Arindam Sil as SP Birbhum
- Harsh Chhaya as Raj
- Swapnil Ghosh as Ratul
- Sujoy Ghosh as a civilian, who doesn't know who Rabindranath Tagore is (cameo)

== Awards ==
- Official Selected at 55th BFI London Film Festival, 2011
- Official Selected at Busan International Film Festival 2011
- Best Indian Film Award at Bengaluru Film Festival for the film Nobel Chor (2012)
