= Basu Poribar (2019 film) =

Basu Paribaar
- Release poster
- Directed by: Suman Ghosh
- Written by: Suman Ghosh
- Starring: Soumitra Chatterjee; Aparna Sen; Rituparna Sengupta; Jisshu Sengupta; Saswata Chatterjee; Koushik Sen
- Cinematography: Soumik Haldar
- Music by: Bickram Ghosh
- Distributed by: Star Synergy Entertainment (North America)
- Release date: 5 April 2019
- Running time: 110 minutes
- Country: India
- Language: Bengali

Basu Paribaar (also spelt Basu Paribar) is a 2019 Bengali film directed by Suman Ghosh. Soumitra Chatterjee and Aparna Sen play the lead roles. It marks the reunification of the actors after 18 years. They last paired in Paromitar Ekdin (2000). The movie was released on April 5, 2019.

== Plot ==
The plot is derived from James Joyce's short story "The Dead". This story revolves around the celebration of the 50th wedding anniversary of an old couple, Pranabendu and Manjari. In this occasion, they have invited all their relatives and friends to their ancient home, Komolini. While everyone is indulging themselves in merry making, Tublu prefers staying alone. He seems to be haunted by some previous memories which he has with this house. The celebration is short lived as hidden complexities start surfacing in the personal lives of the family members. While Pranab boasts of his royal blood and his hereditary aristocracy, he tries to avoid the presence of a crazy old man who lives alone in a dilapidated portion of the house. During dinner time, the same old man arrives at the dinner table. After seeing Pranab angrily scoffing at the poor man, Tublu loses his cool. He accuses Pranab that his vain illusions about aristocracy had been instrumental in the death of the old man's only son Sajal, with whom Tublu had a deep bond. During his youth, Pranab could not tolerate the growing friendship between Manjari and Sajal due to their difference in social status. He took her away to England and Sajal died in her absence. Manjari gets strongly reminded of Sajal's excellent singing skills after hearing a song from Tublu. When Pranab tries to comfort her saying that everything was alright between them in all these years, she coldly asks if at all everything was alright between them.

== Cast ==
- Soumitra Chatterjee as Pranabendu
- Aparna Sen as Manjari
- Rituparna Sengupta as Priya
- Saswata Chatterjee as Tublu
- Jisshu Sengupta as Pratim
- Koushik Sen as Tanmoy
- Paran Bandopadhyay as Porimal
- Lily Chakravarty as Jethima
- Sreenanda Shankar as Roshni
- Sudipta Chakraborty as Pompi
- Subhashish Mukhopadhyay as Photik
- Arun Mukherjee as Prahlad
- Arun Guhathakurta as Golok
- Anindita Bose as young Manjari

== Shooting ==
The film's shooting began in July 2017. It has been shot in various locations of West Bengal including Mahishadal Rajbari.
