= Mukul Sharma =

Indian writer and journalist (died 2019)

- Born: 1949 or 1950
- Died: 1 March 2019 (aged 69); New Delhi, India
- Education: Asutosh College
- Occupations: Writer, Journalist
- Spouse(s): Aparna Sen (divorced); Binita Mohanty
- Children: 2, including Konkona Sen Sharma
- Website: mukulsharma.org.in

Mukul Sharma (1949/1950 – 1 March 2019) was an Indian writer and journalist. He wrote columns and articles on subjects varying from science to films for various newspapers and journals. Some of his short stories are adapted into films. He had acted in few films.

== Biography ==
Sharma was born in a family of an army officer. He studied in six schools across India. He graduated in English literature from Asutosh College in Calcutta (now Kolkata).

After completing studies, he developed an interest in science. He started writing columns and articles on subjects varying from science to films for various newspapers and journal. He moved to Mumbai in 1986 and served as an editor of Science Today. At that time, it had been renamed as 2001, in celebration of the arrival of the new millennium. He wrote a column Mindsport which appeared first in The Illustrated Weekly of India and later in The Sunday Times. The column was published for 25 years before its end on 5 August 2007. It had gained a cult following. He wrote science fiction as well as supernatural fiction.

He also had a brief appearance in his first wife Aparna Sen's 1981 film 36 Chowringhee Lane. In 1984, he debuted as an actor in Sen's film Parama. He played role of a young photographer named Rahul.

His several short stories are adapted in films. 2013 supernatural thriller film Ek Thi Daayan, starring his daughter Konkona Sen Sharma, is adapted from his short story Mobius Trips. It was co-produced by Vishal Bhardwaj who also made two more films: Dream Sequence, about a woman who dreams about waking up but has not woken up, as well as Ghosts, a murder mystery. Konkona Sen Sharma directed 2016 film A Death in the Gunj was based on his short story which in turn was based on an incident during his visit to McCluskieganj.

Sharma died on 1 March 2019 in New Delhi.

== Personal life ==
Sharma married Aparna Sen and had two daughters, Kamalini Chatterjee and Konkona Sen Sharma. They divorced and he later married Binita Mohanty.
