= Kadambari (2015 film) =

2015 Indian Bengali film

Kadambori
- Film poster
- Directed by: Suman Ghosh
- Written by: Suman Ghosh
- Starring: See below
- Cinematography: Barun Mukherjee
- Edited by: Sujay Datta Ray
- Music by: Bickram Ghosh
- Release date: 8 May 2015 (India)
- Running time: 87 mins
- Country: India
- Language: Bengali

Kadambari (2015) is a Bengali film directed by Suman Ghosh and produced by Rakesh Singh. The music of the film was composed by Bickram Ghosh. This is a biopic of Kadambari Devi, the sister-in-law of Rabindranath Tagore and Konkona Sen Sharma and Parambrata Chatterjee played the lead roles.

== Plot ==
This is a biopic of Kadambari Devi, the sister-in-law of Rabindranath Tagore, and daughter-in-law of Debendranath Tagore. Rabindranath's elder brother Jyotirindranath Tagore married Kadambari. In 1868 when Kadambari came to Jorasanko Thakur Bari, Rabidranath was 7 years old and Kadambari was 2 years older than Rabindranath. Very soon Rabindranath became Kadambari's friend and playmate. She inspired young Rabindranath in composing many of his poems and songs. On 9 December 1883, Rabindranath married Mrinalini Devi. Four months after the marriage on 21 April (1884), Kadambari committed suicide. The director captured these details, and specially the relationship between Kadambari and Rabindranath in this film.

== Cast ==
- Konkona Sen Sharma as Kadambari Devi
- Parambrata Chatterjee as Rabindranath Tagore
- Kaushik Sen as Jyotirindranath Tagore
- Titas Bhowmik as Jnanadanandini Devi
- Sanjoy Nag as Debendranath Tagore
- Srikanto Acharya as Satyendranath Tagore
- Sreelekha Mitra as Binodini Dasi

== Critical reception ==
Upam Buzarbaruah of The Times of India reviewed "Kadambari is a film you shouldn't miss. Yes, it has its minor flaws, but when it comes to being an entertainer, it gets full marks."

== Awards ==
- 2014: Official Selected at kolkata International Film festival for Kadambari
- 2015: Best Film Award at Washington DC South Asian Film Festival,
