= Filmfare Awards East =

Bengali segment of the annual Filmfare Awards

- Awarded for: Best in film
- Country: India
- Presented by: Filmfare
- First award: Bengali (1964)/Re-started (2014); Assamese (2014); Odia (2014)
- Final award: Bengali (2018)
- Website: Filmfare Awards East

Television/radio coverage
- Network: Colors Bangla (2014–2018)

Filmfare Awards East were the annual awards segment of the annual Filmfare Awards, presented by The Times Group to honour the artistic and cinematic excellence in Bengali, Assamese and Odia. The first installment of the awards was held for Bengali, Assamese and Odia films in a ceremony on 29 March 2014.

The award was discontinued in 2015 and 2016 due to the unequal representation and award distribution among the three film industries. The ceremony was re-started from 2017 but awards were given only to the Bengali films. From 2021 onwards, it was rebranded as the Filmfare Awards Bangla and awards are being presented only to the Bengali film industry.

== History ==
On 8 March 2014, in a press conference held at Kolkata, the Worldwide Media group announced that Filmfare Award is debuting in Eastern India to honour the best cinematic artistic talent of the region. In the inaugural installment, awards in 29 categories would be given away at the Science City auditorium, Kolkata on 29 March 2014. The awards would include 21 trophies for Bengali movies and four each for Odia and Assamese films. The four categories for both Odia and Assamese films are Best Film, Best Director, Best Actor and Best Actress. The winners would be selected from 102 entries in Bengali films, 36 and 14 entries respectively from the Odia and Assamese films.

Bengali film actor Prosenjit Chatterjee was present as the chief guest in that occasion. Thereafter two other press conferences followed in Bhubaneswar on 11 March and Guwahati on 14 March 2014 in the presence of Odia film actor Anubhav Mohanty and Assamese film actors Kopil Bora and Zerifa Wahid respectively.

The award was discontinued in 2015 and 2016 due to the unequal representation and award distribution among the three film industries. The ceremony was re-started from 2017 but awards were given only to the Bengali films for 2 years - 2017 and 2018. The ceremony was cancelled in 2019 and 2020 due to the then ongoing COVID-19 pandemic. 2021 onwards, it was rebranded as the Filmfare Awards Bangla and awards are being presented only to the Bengali film industry.

== Winners ==
1963

Best Film	Mahanagar – R. D. Bhansal

1964

Best Film	Charulata – R. D. Bhansal

1965

Best Film	Atithi – S. N. Sircar

1966

Best Film	Balika Badhu – Samila Devi

1967

Best Film	Hatey Bazarey – Asim Dutta

1968

Best Film	Apanjan – R. K. Kapoor

1969

Best Film	Kamal Lata – Nirel Sil

1970

Best Film	Pratidwandi – Nepal Dutta Asim Dutta

1971

Best Film	Nimantran – Bharat Shumsher Jung Bahadur Rana

1972

Best Film	Mem Saheb – Ashim Bhattacharjee

1973

Best Film	Strir Patra – Dhrupadi

1974

Best Film	Best Director
Amanush – Shakti Samanta	Piyush Bose – Bikaley Bhorer Phool
Best Actor	Best Actress
Uttam Kumar- Amanush	Aparna Sen – Sujata

1975

Best Film	Best Director
Sansar Simante – Subir Ghosh	Satyajit Ray – Sonar Kella
Best Actor	Best Actress
Soumitra Chatterjee – Sansar Simante	Suchitra Sen – Priya Bandhabi

1976

Best Film	Best Director
Jana Aranya – Subir Guha	Satyajit Ray – Jana Aranya
Best Actor	Best Actress
Pradip Mukherjee – Jana Aranya	Aparna Sen – Asamaya

1977

Best Film	Best Director
Ek Je Chhilo Desh – Raj Kapoor	Ritwik Ghatak – Jukti Takko Aar Gappo
Best Actor	Best Actress
Soumitra Chatterjee- Babu Moshai	Supriya Devi – Sister

1978

Best Film	Best Director
Baarbodhu – Dehabrata Sircar	Bijoy Chatterjee – Baarbodhu
Best Actor	Best Actress
Uttam Kumar- Dhanraj Tamang	Gita Siddharth – Baarbodhu

1979

Best Film	Best Director
Ganadevata – Department of Information and Cultural Affairs, Government of West Bengal	Satyajit Ray – Joi Baba Felunath
Best Actor	Best Actress
Soumitra Chatterjee- Ganadevata	Sandhya Roy – Ganadevata

1980

Best Film	Best Director
Bancharamer Bagan	Tapan Sinha – Bancharamer Bagan
Best Actor	Best Actress
Manoj Mitra- Bancharamer Bagan	Mahua Roychoudhury – Dadar Kirti

1981

Best Film	Best Director
Dooratwa – Buddhadeb Dasgupta	Buddhadeb Dasgupta – Dooratwa
Best Actor	Best Actress
Tapas Paul- Saheb	Sumitra Mukherjee – Baisakhi Megh

1982

Best Film	Best Director
Kharij – Mrinal Sen	Mrinal Sen – Akaler Shandhaney
Best Actor	Best Actress
Dhritiman Chatterjee- Akaler Shandhaney	Aparna Sen – Bijoyini

1983

Best Film	Best Director
Chokh – Department of Information & Cultural Affairs, Government of West Bengal	Utpalendu Chakrabarty – Chokh
Best Actor	Best Actress
Soumitra Chatterjee- Agradani	Aparna Sen – Indira

1985

Best Film	Best Director
Parama – Niharendu Guha	Aparna Sen – Parama
Best Actor	Best Actress
Victor Banerjee- Ghare Bairi	Raakhee – Parama

== Later ceremonies ==
- 1st Filmfare Awards East - 2014
- 2nd Filmfare Awards East - 2017 (only Bengali films were awarded)
- 3rd Filmfare Awards East - 2018 (only Bengali films were awarded)
