= Jiban Saikate =

1972 Indian Bengali romantic drama film

- Directed by: Swadesh Sarkar
- Based on: The Citadel (novel) by A. J. Cronin; Tere Mere Sapne (1971 film)
- Screenplay by: Swadesh Sarkar; Biru Chatterjee
- Story by: Tirtha Chatterjee
- Produced by: Kartik Burman
- Starring: Soumitra Chatterjee; Aparna Sen; Dilip Roy; Monica Mitra
- Cinematography: Krishna Chakraborty
- Edited by: Baidyanath Chatterjee
- Music by: Sudhin Dasgupta
- Production company: Radharani Pictures
- Distributed by: Chandimata Films Pvt. Ltd.
- Release date: 12 May 1972
- Country: India
- Language: Bengali

Jiban Saikate is a 1972 Indian Bengali romantic drama film directed by Swadesh Sarkar. Based on the novel The Citadel by A. J. Cronin, the film stars Soumitra Chatterjee, Aparna Sen and Dilip Roy in the lead roles. It was produced by Kartik Chandra Barman and was released under the banner of Radharani Pictures. It was remade in Telugu film as Madhura Swapnam.

== Cast ==
- Soumitra Chatterjee
- Aparna Sen
- Dilip Roy

== Song ==
The music of the film is by Sudhin Dasgupta. All songs except "Keno Je Ke Jaane" were written by Dasgupta. "Keno Je Ke Jaane" was written by Pulak Bandyopadhyay.

Song	Singer
"Sagor Daake Aay Aay"	Asha Bhosle
"Raat Ekhono Onek Baaki"	Asha Bhosle
"More Gechhi, Na Benche Aachhi"	Manna Dey, Manabendra Mukherjee
"Keno Je Ke Jaane"	Sandhya Mukherjee
