= Sati (film) =

- Poster
- Directed by: Aparna Sen
- Screenplay by: Aparna Sen; Arun Banerjee
- Produced by: NFDC
- Starring: Shabana Azmi
- Cinematography: Ashok Mehta
- Edited by: Shaktipada Roy
- Music by: Chidananda Das Gupta; Chandan Raichaudhri
- Release date: 23 November 1989 (India)
- Running time: 140 minutes
- Country: India
- Language: Bengali

Sati is a Bengali film released in 1989 written and directed by Aparna Sen. The film is about a mute orphan girl who is married to a Banyan tree because her horoscope suggests that she would be a sati, and her husband would die. The film had Shabana Azmi and Arun Banerjee in lead roles.

Along with her previous films, Parama (1984), Aparna Sen became the first female director in Bengali cinema to explore gender issues and feminist perspective.

== Synopsis ==
The young Brahmin girl (Shabana Azmi) in this story has a disastrous horoscope. In an Indian village in 1828, this can be a real handicap. The fact that she is mute only compounds her difficulties. Her horoscope predicts that she will become a widow at an early age. If this turns out as predicted, in addition to being bad luck for her prospective husbands, it is bad luck for her, as she will, according to the customs of the time, have to commit suttee, sati. That means she will have to be burned alive on her husband's funeral pyre. To avoid this fate, her family has hit upon the appealing stratagem of having her marry a banyan tree.

== Cast ==
- Shabana Azmi — Uma (Umi)
- Arun Banerjee
- Kali Banerjee
- Pradip Mukherjee
- Arindam Ganguli
- Shakuntala Barua
- Laboni Sarkar
