= Apna Asmaan =

- Theatrical release poster
- Directed by: Kaushik Roy
- Screenplay by: Kaushik Roy
- Produced by: Umang Pahwa; Kaushik Roy
- Starring: Irrfan Khan; Shobana; Anupam Kher; Dhruv Piyush Panjuani
- Cinematography: Barun Mukherji
- Edited by: Amitabh Shukla
- Music by: Lesle Lewis
- Production company: ImaginationWorks
- Distributed by: Sony Pictures Releasing
- Release date: 7 September 2007
- Running time: 110 minutes
- Country: India
- Language: Hindi

Apna Asmaan (transl. Our sky) is a 2007 Indian Hindi-language drama film directed by Kaushik Roy, starring Irrfan Khan, Shobana and Dhruv Piyush Panjuani in pivotal roles, with Rajat Kapoor and Anupam Kher in supporting roles. Khan plays the protagonist, an "everyman" who is discontented with a failing marriage and an autistic son Buddhi played by Dhruv Panjuani. He is constantly blamed by his wife Padmini, played by Shobana, for their son's condition. After meeting a scientist Dr. Sathya, played by Anupam Kher, Ravi obtains a drug which cures mental disorders from him and injects Buddhi, leading him to become intelligent. However, in the process, Buddhi starts to forget his parents and friends, leading to uncontrollable tragic events.

The film was originally planned in 1999 by director Kaushik Roy, who conceptualised the idea from his own child Orko. According to the former, the film deals with autism, an issue which is foreseen as taboo in Indian society. The film made its theatrical debut in India on 7 September 2007, with international premieres held at the ReelWorld Film Festival in Toronto, the San Luis Cine Festival and the Stuttgart Film Festival in 2008. The film received several accolades at various film festivals.

Apna Asmaan received mixed reviews from critics, who debated the direction and story, but praised the acting, themes and messages about the parents' overambitious dreams inherited to their children. It was cited as one of the most-talked films of 2007, which established the film as an art film rather than a commercial film.

== Story ==
Ravi Kumar is a plastic salesman working for Opel Plastics who is enduring a failing marriage. He has a son, Buddhi, who is autistic and a slow learner. Because of Buddhi, Ravi and his wife Padmini share a resentful relationship, where she blames Ravi for Buddhi's intellectual handicap. One day, Ravi watches an interview of a scientist, Dr. Sathya, who invented a controversial drug called "brain booster", which can cure mental problems. He comes with a notion to meet Sathya and get the medicine from him. After meeting with Sathya, he gets the medicine and reluctantly injects in Buddhi, which grants him intellectual strength. However, the drug has a side effect, amnesia, in which he starts to forget his parents and relatives.

Thereafter, Buddhi changes his lifestyle and turns out to be extremely popular among his classmates. Despite Buddhi's arrogant and unruly behaviour, his parents are happy to see that he is normal. But, on the other hand, Ravi learns that Sathya has connections in underworld drug cartel, and he is now wanted by police. After winning a mathematics quiz show, Buddhi is given the title of "Aryabhatta" and becomes popular in the media and receives fame as a "mathe-magician" celebrity. After "Aryabhatta" indulges in several kinds of vices and crimes, his parents learn from Dr. Sen that Buddhi's limbic brain has been damaged, and he concludes that limbic brain dysfunction leads to a negative and antisocial personality. In order to stop "Aryabhatta", Ravi and Padmini seek the help of Dr. Sen to find Dr. Sathya for an antidote. Dr. Sen, Ravi, and Padmini track down Sathya, who was hiding in an old-age home. Ravi and Padmini retrieve the antidote from him, and Sathya apologises to the couple for destroying Buddhi's life.

One night, in an attempt to inject the antidote in "Aryabhatta", he starts to threaten and attack Ravi with the same injection. In order to save Ravi from "Aryabhatta", Padmini attacks him and injects him with the medicine, thus calming the latter. The next day, Buddhi returns to his normal self and begins to paint again. His paintings are now exhibited by his parents, thus accepting his talent.

== Cast ==
- Irrfan Khan as Ravi Kumar
- Shobana as Padmini Kumar
- Anupam Kher as Dr. Sathya
- Rajat Kapoor as Dr. Sen
- Dhruv Piyush Panjuani as Buddhi Kumar "Aryabhatta".
- Utkarsha Naik as Mrs. Sharma
- Nassar Abdullah as Mr. Sharma
- Barkha Singh as Pinky Sharma

== Production ==
=== Development ===
Director Kaushik Roy conceptualised the idea in 1999 from his own son Orko. He stated that the film has message for parents who has over-ambitious dreams.

== Music ==
The music of the film is composed by Lesle Lewis and lyrics written by Mehboob.

#	Title	Singer(s)
1	"Katra Katra"	Sukhwinder Singh
2	"Jhanana Jhanana"	K. S. Chithra
3	"Dil Ka Tarana"	Sunidhi Chauhan, Shaan
4	"Chand Re"	Shreya Ghoshal
5	"Shehzada"	Shaan
6	"Katra Katra - Reprise"	Sukhwinder Singh
7	"Apna Asmaan ((Instrumental))"	
