= Bariwali =

2000 Bengali film

- Directed by: Rituparno Ghosh
- Produced by: Anupam Kher
- Starring: Kirron Kher; Chiranjeet; Roopa Ganguly; Sudipta Chakraborty; Abhishek Chatterjee
- Cinematography: Vivek Shah
- Edited by: Arghyakamal Mitra
- Music by: Debojyoti Mishra
- Release date: 2000
- Country: India
- Language: Bengali

Bariwali (LandLady) is a Bengali film released in 2000 directed by Rituparno Ghosh. The film features Kirron Kher, Roopa Ganguly, and Chiranjeet Chakraborty.

== Synopsis ==
The film is a quiet drama about a lonely, sad, unfortunate middle-aged woman. Banalata (Kiron Kher) has lived a solitary existence since her husband-to-be died the night before their wedding from a snake bite. Never having quite gotten over the tragedy, she rarely ventures out and is clearly very lonely. This changes when she agrees to allow a film production unit to shoot in a wing in her sprawling estate. Suddenly her house is filled with movie stars and glamorous people, including the beautiful actress Sudeshna (Roopa Ganguly) and charming director Deepankar (Chiranjeet Chakraborty). Though she knows that not only is Deepankar married but that his former lover Sudeshna still holds a torch for him, the lonely woman finds herself drawn to the director. He is exactly the sort of worldly character whom she has always longed to meet. The rakish man flirts back and even persuades Banalata to appear in a bit part in the movie. Yet once the film crew decamps, things at the estate return to the same grinding tedium as before, though the woman feels her isolation all the more acutely. The letters that Banalata writes to Deepankar go unanswered, and her bit part in the movie ends up on the cutting-room floor.

== Cast ==
- Kirron Kher as Banalata (Note: Voice dubbed by Rita Koiral)
- Chiranjeet Chakraborty as Deepankar (Note: Voice dubbed by Sabyasachi Chakrabarty)
- Roopa Ganguly as Sudeshna Mitra
- Sudipta Chakraborty as Malati
- Surya Chatterjee as Prasanna
- Abhishek Chatterjee as Abhijeet Chatterjee
- Shiboprosad Mukherjee as Debashish
- Sudeshna Roy
- Rukkmini Ghosh

== Controversy ==
Rita Koiral, an Indian actress in the Bengali language, in a 2017 TV show, claimed, she was asked to withhold to the media, the fact that she had dubbed the voice of actress Kirron Kher. Her contribution was not declared in the national awards nominations for the movie.
