= Shabana Azmi =

Indian actress (born 1950)

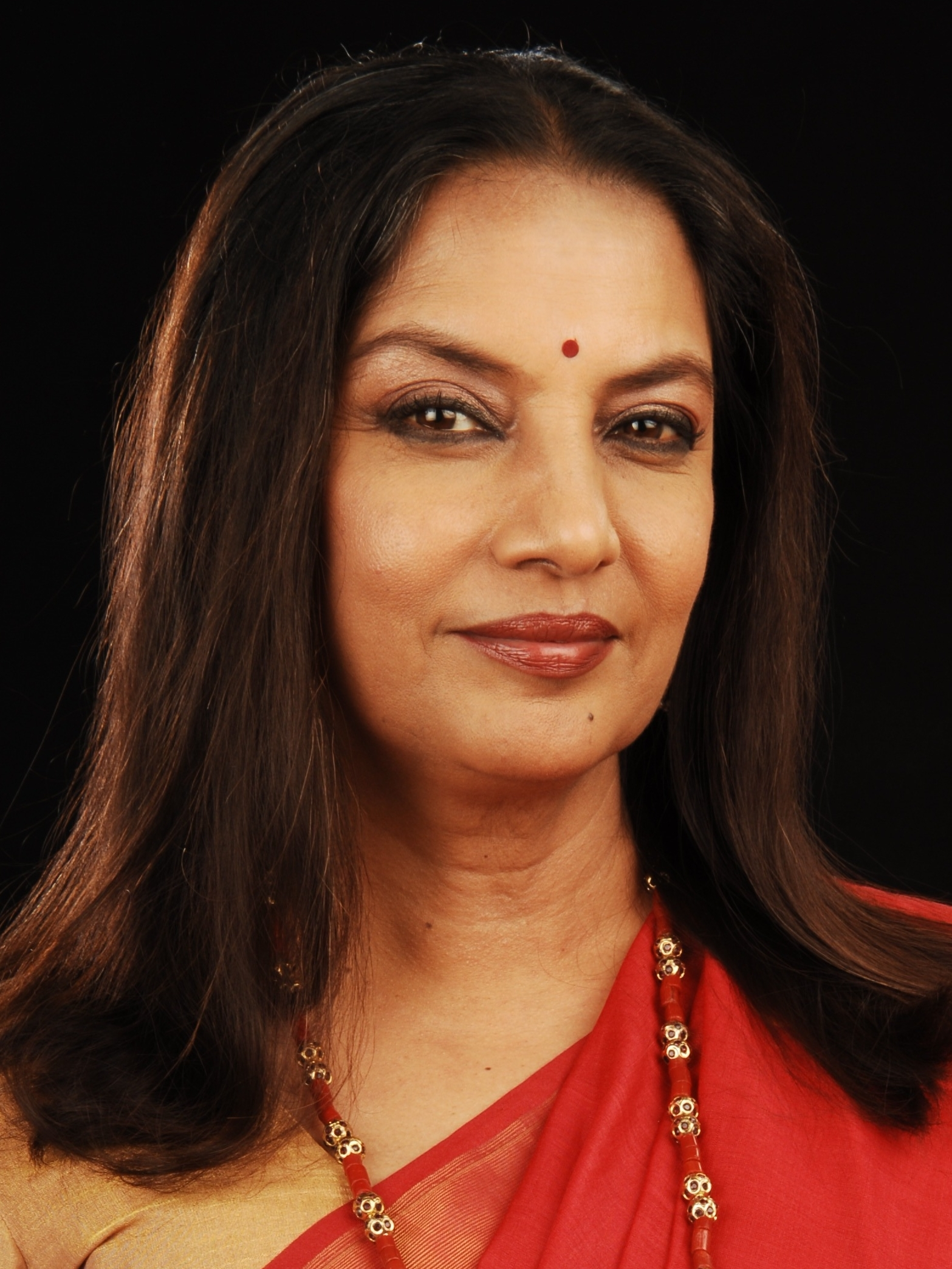
- Azmi at the SFU in October 2009
- Pronunciation: [ʃəbɑːnɑ ɑːzmiː]
- Born: Shabana Kaifi Azmi; 18 September 1950 (age 76); Hyderabad, Telangana, India
- Occupations: Actress; social activist
- Works: Full list
- Spouse: Javed Akhtar (m. 1984)
- Parents: Kaifi Azmi (father); Shaukat Kaifi (mother)
- Relatives: Baba Azmi (brother)
- Family: Akhtar-Azmi family
- Honours: Padma Bhushan (2012)

Member of Parliament, Rajya Sabha
- In office 27 August 1997 – 26 August 2003
- Nominated by: K. R. Narayanan
- Preceded by: M. Aram
- Succeeded by: Hema Malini
- Constituency: Nominated (Arts)

Signature
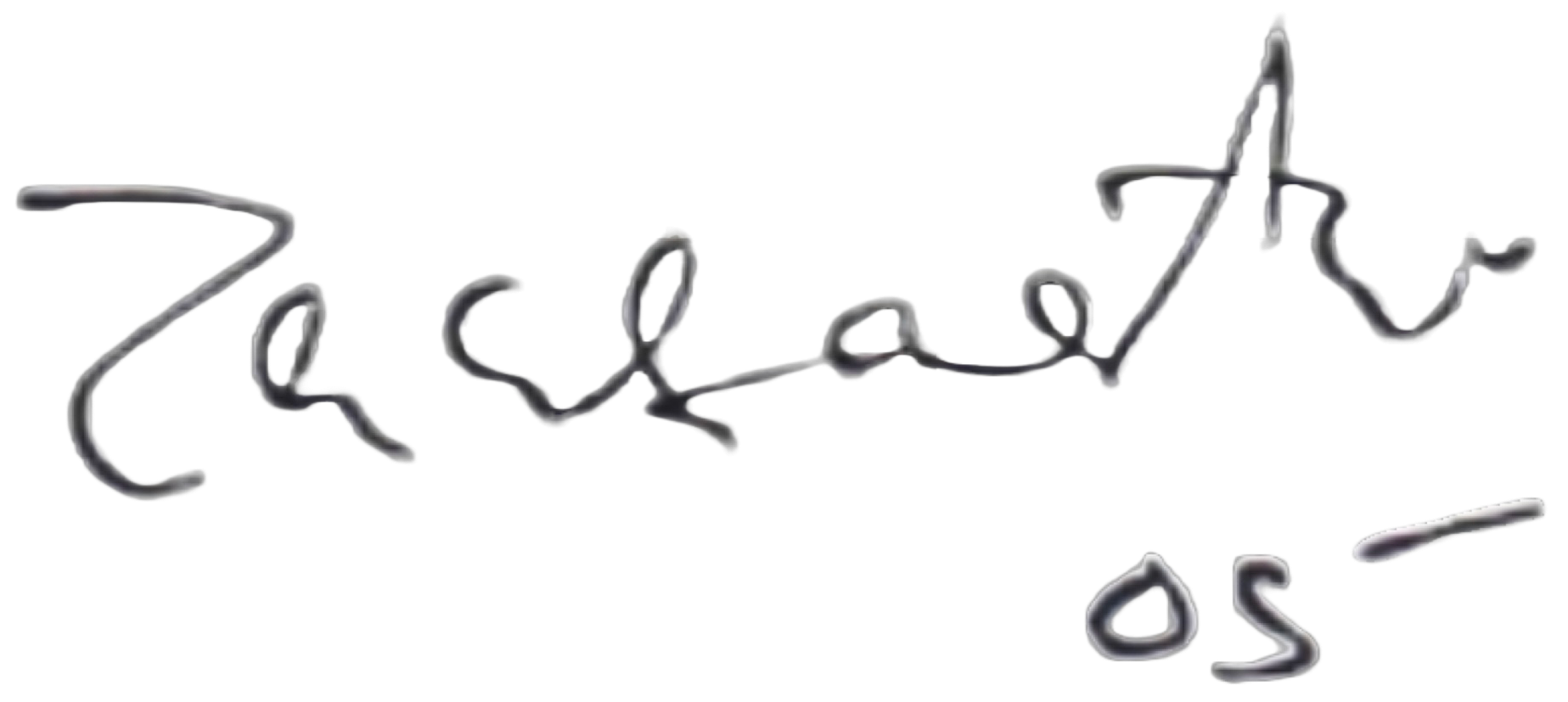

Shabana Azmi (Hindustani pronunciation: [ʃəbɑːnɑ ɑːzmiː]; born 18 September 1950) is an Indian actress of film, television and theatre. Her career in the Hindi film industry has spanned over 160 films, mostly within independent and neorealist parallel cinema, though her work extended to mainstream films as well as a number of international projects. One of India's most acclaimed actresses, Azmi is known for her portrayals of distinctive, often unconventional female characters across several genres. She has won a record of five National Film Awards for Best Actress, in addition to five Filmfare Awards and several international accolades. The Government of India honoured her with the Padma Shri in 1998 and the Padma Bhushan in 2012.

The daughter of poet Kaifi Azmi and stage actress Shaukat Azmi, she is an alumna of Film and Television Institute of India of Pune. Azmi made her film debut in 1974 with Ankur and soon became one of the leading actresses of parallel cinema, then a new-wave movement of art films known for their serious content and realism and sometimes received government patronage. Several of her films have been cited as a form of progressivism and social reformism which offer a realistic portrayal of Indian society, its customs and traditions.

In addition to acting, Azmi is a social and women's rights activist. She is married to poet and screenwriter Javed Akhtar. She is a Goodwill Ambassador of the United Nations Population Fund (UNPFA). In appreciation of Azmi's life and works, the President of India gave her a nominated (unelected) membership of the Rajya Sabha, the upper house of parliament.

== Early life and education ==
Azmi was born on 18 September 1950 in Hyderabad, India to poet and songwriter Kaifi Azmi and veteran stage actor Shaukat Azmi. Her parents called her Munni; she was christened with her given name by writer Ali Sardar Jafri when she turned eleven. She has one brother, Baba Azmi, who is a cinematographer married to actor Tanvi Azmi.

Azmi's parents were members of the Communist Party of India (CPI). Until she was nine, the family lived in Red Flat Hall, a CPI commune with eight families. Each family was allocated one room, and shared one bathroom and lavatory with the other families. She describes the atmosphere at home as "completely bohemian." According to her, members of the party "had re-defined the husband-wife relationship"; most women had jobs, and were not the sole bearers of childrearing responsibilities. When her mother was touring with Prithvi Theatre, her father looked after Azmi and her brother. He also helped Shaukat rehearse cues for her new play or film; he believed that it was their duty as a family to "make it possible for her (Shaukat) to rehearse her lines as many times as she needed."

Azmi's childhood was characterised by numerous mehfils (social gatherings) that took place at her home; people from all walks of life would come over to listen to poetry recitals from her father and other eminent intellectuals like Josh Malihabadi, Firaq Gorakpuri, Faiz Ahmed Faiz, Sajjad Zaheer and Begum Akhtar. Azmi was "fascinated" by these mehfils. "I would sit up in rapt attention, not even half understanding what they recited, but excited nevertheless," she told Screen, "Their beautiful words fell like music on my young ears." She also accompanied her parents to mushairas (poetic symposiums), listening to nazms (Urdu poetry) by Sahir Ludhianvi and Ali Sardar Jafri. "Baba and I used to be fast asleep on the stage, behind the gao takiyas (bolsters), and would invariably wake up to the thunderous applause that resonated every time his name was announced," she recalled, "He was always amongst the last to recite—his deeply resonant voice pulsating with vigour, drama and power."

Azmi travelled to Prithvi Theatre with her mother, and Mazdoor Kisan meetings in Madanpura with her father. "There used to be red banners everywhere, a lot of narebaazi (sloganeering) and a lot of protest poetry," she said, "As a child, I was only interested in these rallies because the mazdoors pampered me. Imperceptibly, however, my roots were catching soil." Azmi considers her eventual involvement in activism to be "an extension of what I saw happening as a child."

Azmi attended Queen Mary School, Mumbai, and graduated from St. Xavier's College, Mumbai degree in Psychology. During her time at Xavier's, she started a Hindi theatre group with her senior Farooq Sheikh, and together, they won several awards in inter-college drama competitions. She was drawn to acting after "being completely enchanted" by Jaya Bhaduri's performance in Suman. Her father supported her choice to pursue acting, following which she joined the Film and Television Institute of India, Pune, where she was awarded the gold medal for the Best Student in Acting.

== Career ==
Shabana Azmi does not immediately fit into her rustic surroundings, but her poise and her personality are never in doubt, and in two high-pitched scenes she pulls out all her stops and firmly establishes herself as one of our finest dramatic actresses."

— Satyajit Ray on Azmi's performance in Ankur (1975)

=== Film ===
During her final year at FTII, Azmi was offered Khwaja Ahmad Abbas' Faslah (1974) and Kanti Lal Rathore's Parinay (1974) but Shyam Benegal's Ankur (1974) became her debut film. Speaking to Mumbai Mirror, Benegal said he took one look at Azmi and knew she was perfect for the role of Laxmi,"a Hyderabadi servant girl who could speak a smattering of Telugu." Waheeda Rehman and Aparna Sen were two of the four actors under consideration to play Laxmi, but had rejected the offer. At the time of casting, Azmi didn't speak Telugu, but she was fluent in Deccani, a dialect of Urdu that borrows from Marathi, which Benegal thought "was essential to fleshing out the character." He also said that at twenty four years old, Azmi "looked too young" to play Laxmi but he was "willing to tweak the role" for her. The film received critical acclaim upon release, earning her first National Film Award for Best Actress and her first nomination for the Filmfare Award for Best Actress. Indian Urdu novelist and journalist Qurratulain Hyder wrote that Azmi "lives her role [as Laxmi]" and "acts like a seasoned dramatic actress" despite Ankur being her first film. Paramita Ghosh from The Indian Express said that "Azmi's Laxmi is a woman of touching vulnerability and pragmatism."

Impressed with Azmi's "huge range" as an actor, Benegal also cast her in Nishant (1975), Junoon (1978), Mandi(1983), Susman (1978), and Antarnaad (1991). Mandi was a "bawdy black comedy" featuring Azmi as the brothel madam Rukminibai and Smita Patil, with whom she had also shared the screen in Arth (1982). She played an urban Indian wife, mother, and homemaker in Shekhar Kapur's directorial debut Masoom (1983). Between 1983 and 1985, Azmi received three National Film Award for Best Actress for her performance in Arth, Mrinal Sen's Khandhar (1984) and Gautam Ghose's Paar (1984).

She also starred in Aparna Sen's Picnic (1975), Satyajit Ray's Shatranj Ke Khilari (The Chess Players) (1977), Manmohan Desai's Amar Akbar Anthony (1977), Parvarish (1977), Prakash Mehra's Jwalamukhi (1980), Saeed Mirza's Albert Pinto Ko Gussa Kyon Aata Hai (1980), Sai Paranjpye's Sparsh (1980), Genesis (1986), Ek Din Achanak (1989), and Sati (1989). She was also seen in John Schlesinger's Madame Sousatzka (1988).

In 1990, Azmi teamed up with Sai Paranjpye again for Disha. She also appeared in Roland Joffe's City of Joy (1992). She dabbled in experimental and parallel Indian cinema with Deepa Mehta's Fire (1996), playing Radha, a lonesome young woman in love with her sister-in-law. The film received critical acclaim after being released overseas in 1996. Azmi won the Silver Hugo Award for Best Actress at the 32nd Chicago Film Festival and Jury Award for Best Actress at Outfest, Los Angeles.

When Fire was released in India two years later, the on-screen depiction of lesbianism (perhaps the first in Indian cinema) was deemed "alien to Indian culture" and led to numerous protests urging the Central Board of Film Certification (CBFC) to ban the film. In her memoir, Hit Girl (2017), the then CBFC chairperson and actor Asha Parekh wrote that Fire explored "the bold theme of same-gender love between two women" aesthetically and without sensationalism. "There was no reason to ban it at all or delete a kissing scene between Shabana Azmi and Nandita Das," she said, "Sanjivani Kutti (regional manager of CBFC) and I stuck to the collective decision, the censors would not recall the film for a second opinion."

Azmi's performance in Godmother (1999) earned her a fifth National Film Award. She was the initial choice for Deepa Mehta's Water (2005), which was planned to hit the floors in 2000. A few scenes were already shot. Azmi had to shave her head with Nandita Das to portray the character of Shakuntala. However, due to political reasons, the film was shelved and later shot in 2005 with Seema Biswas replacing Azmi.

=== Television ===
Azmi debuted on the small screen in a soap opera titled Anupamaa. She portrayed a modern Indian woman who, while endorsing traditional Indian ethos and values, negotiated more freedom for herself.

=== Theatre ===
In a conversation with actor Vidya Balan at the MAMI Mumbai Film Festival 2024, Azmi said that although the "thrill of performing live on stage is unmatched," she finds theatre "incredibly challenging" and does not consider it be her first medium. "I wouldn't say it's the most satisfying because a film performance lasts forever, whereas theatre is ephemeral," she added.

She has participated in many stage plays: notable among them include M. S. Sathyu's Safed Kundali (1980), based on The Caucasian Chalk Circle; and Feroz Abbas Khan's Tumhari Amrita with actor Farooq Sheikh, which ran for five years. She toured Singapore on an assignment with the Singapore Repertory Theatre Company, acting in Ingmar Bergman's adaptation of Ibsen's A Doll's House, which was directed by Rey Buono. She toured the UK, Dubai and India with British production Happy Birthday Sunita by Rifco Theatre Company in 2014.

== Personal life ==
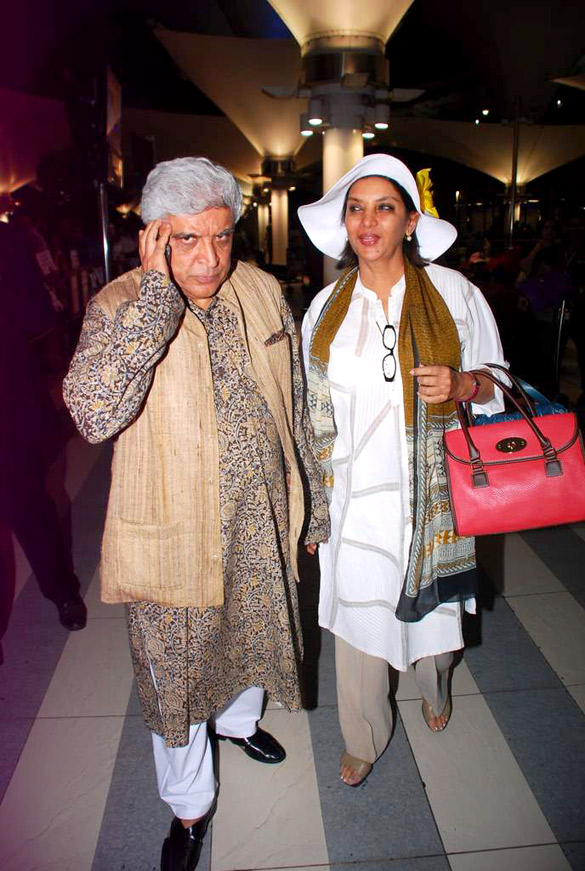
Shabana Azmi with Javed Akhtar, in 2012.

Azmi was engaged to Benjamin Gilani in late 1970s, but the engagement was called off. She later had a relationship with filmmaker Shekhar Kapur for seven years.

On 9 December 1984, she married Javed Akhtar, a lyricist, poet and scriptwriter in Hindi films, making her a member of the Akhtar-Azmi film family. It was Akhtar's second marriage, the first being with Hindi film scriptwriter, Honey Irani. Azmi's mother was "unhappy" about her relationship with Akhtar, as he was still married to Irani and had two children (Farhan and Zoya). For similar reasons, Azmi also faced "tremendous pressure" from her "well-wishers" to break up with him. During this time, she confided in her father about the circumstances of Akhtar's marriage; she believed his marriage was "long over" before they met. "There were no further questions asked. Abba didn't probe, didn't want to know the details of what that meant. He trusted me enough to take me for my word and gave me his blessings," Azmi recalled in an interview, "That was one of the most momentous decisions of my life—had [he] truly said no, I wonder if I would have had the courage to defy him: Not because I'm frightened of him but because in the most personal of matters he can be relied upon to make the most objective judgement."

Akhtar and Azmi have no children. In an interview with The Indian Express, she revealed that not being able to have children was "tough" for her to accept, as society "makes you feel incomplete." She said that "women often measure self-worth from their relationships–how they hold up as a wife, mother, daughter," as opposed to men who derive the "greatest satisfaction" from their career. Azmi credits her mother for changing "her perspective on motherhood and life."

Indian actors Farah Naaz and Tabu are Azmi's nieces, and TV actor Tanvi Azmi is her sister-in-law.

== Activism and other humanitarian work ==
=== Women's reproductive rights ===
As UNFPA Goodwill Ambassador, Azmi participated in a march at the Taj Mahal on World Health Day in 2001 to draw attention to the "number of women who still die of causes related to pregnancy and childbirth each year." After the world population crossed six billion in October 1999, Azmi said that "350 million women" globally did not have access to "safe and effective family planning methods." She advocated for policy reform that encouraged men and women to be "equal partners in decisions related to reproductive health issues." She cited the "success stories in Tamil Nadu and Kerala" where similar policies had been implemented. "You need to have access to safe methods of contraception and a mix of contraceptive services, ensure safe motherhood, to bring down infant mortality and empower women in their decision-making abilities," she said, "All this is there in the Reproductive and Child Health (RCH) programme in India since 1997. If we would merely implement the programme, we would be successful."

=== Hunger strike against the 1985 Sanjay Gandhi Nagar slum demolition ===
In April 1986, Azmi was one of five people, including Anand Patwardhan, who went on an "indefinite hunger strike to demand alternative housing sites for evicted residents of Sanjay Gandhi Nagar, Mumbai." The strike was part of "an ongoing struggle for the rights of slum and pavement dwellers, who are constantly under attack by civic authorities." She criticised the media for not questioning why the slum-dwellers were on a strike, and spoke about the prejudice that slum-dwellers face. Azmi said that many people assume that slum-dwellers are not "working people" and consider slums to be areas "where crime takes place [and] illicit liquor is brewed." She called for them to be "viewed more sympathetically."

The strike was under the aegis of Nivara Hakk, a housing rights NGO that Azmi later joined. In 1986, the Maharashtra government offered the Sanjay Gandhi Nagar residents a three-acre plot in Goregaon for rehabilitation. Nivara Hakk helped to level the barren land, and architect P.K. Das designed low-rise buildings.

=== HIV/AIDS prevention and management ===
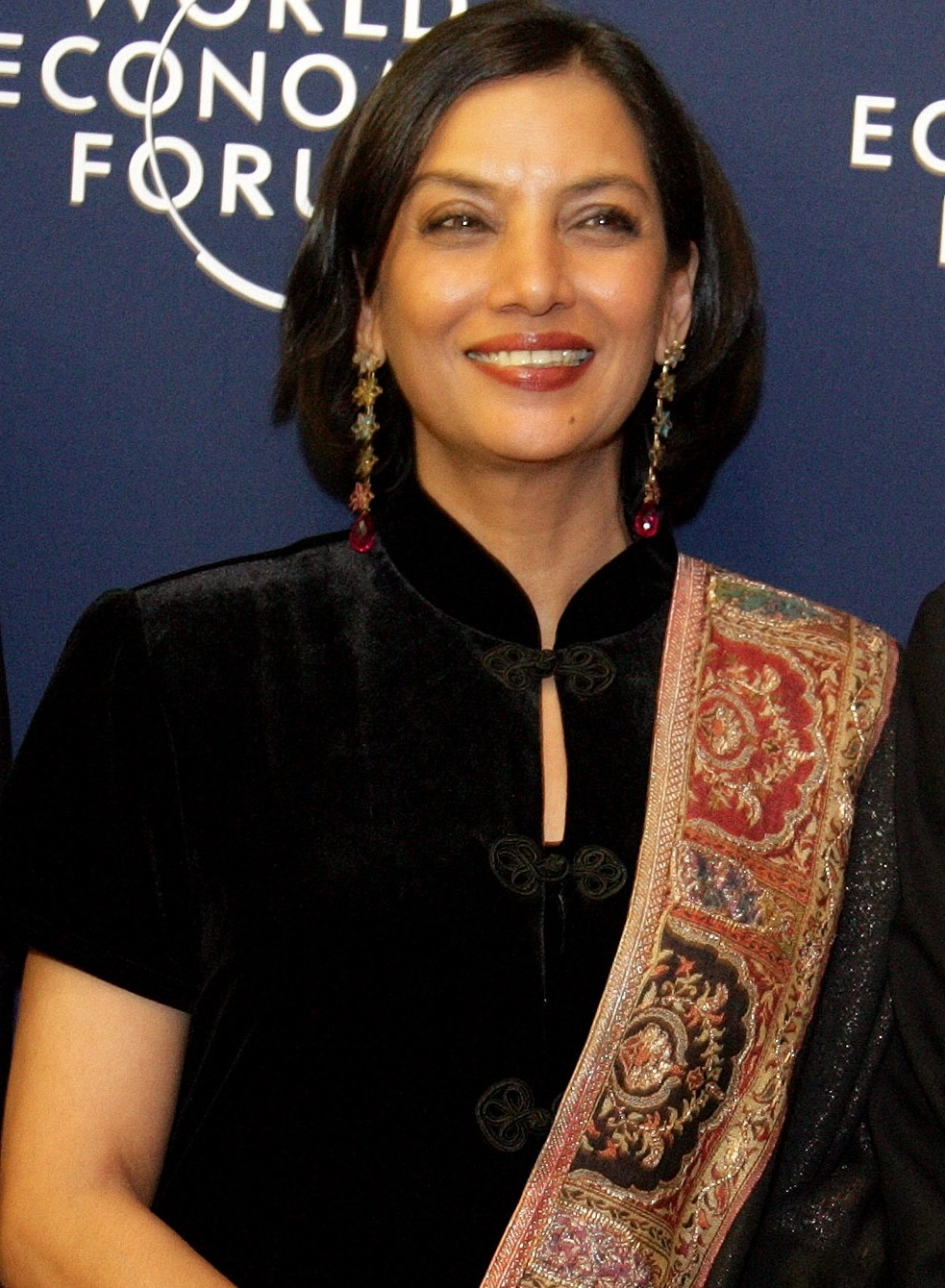
Azmi at the 2006 World Economic Forum

In October 2001, Azmi spoke at the Sixth International Congress on AIDS in Asia and the Pacific on preventing HIV and safeguarding reproductive health. She appealed to the "influential leaders" to dedicate intellectual and financial resources for tackling the HIV/AIDS epidemic. She also encouraged "film stars, sportspersons and other celebrities" to "voluntarily convey HIV/AIDS prevention and control message to the people." She called upon the policymakers to target adolescents "as a priority group" for their prevention work. "The issues of sexuality and sexual health must be taken out of the closet. We need to realise that adolescents are increasingly involved in sexual activity and that they are not fully informed of the risks of HIV infection or other sexually transmitted diseases," she said, "If the government does not ensure adolescents access to unbiased information on HIV/AIDS and the means to avoid infection. There is a real danger that the epidemic could grow out of proportion in the very near future."

As the goodwill ambassador of South Asian Regional Cooperation (SAARC), she campaigned against the "unjust and unjustified" ostracism of people suffering from HIV/AIDS. Speaking at a 2009 press conference organized by SAARC Tuberculosis Center in the Kathmandu, Nepal, she said that HIV is "not just a medical problem" but a "social, cultural and economic" issue.

After the first case of HIV/AIDS was detected in India in the 1980s, Azmi starred in a Doordarshan advertisement aimed at dispelling the commonly-believed myth that HIV/AIDS spreads through physical touch. In the ad, she is seen hugging a child, presumably an AIDS patient, and saying: "Chhoone se AIDS nahi hota. Chhoone se sirf pyar failta hai." (AIDS is not spread through touch. Only love spreads by touch). She later mentioned that the ad achieved the "highest recall among ads" that year. In a Bengali film Meghla Akash (2001), directed by Nargis Akhter, she played a physician treating AIDS patients. In 2009, she partnered with a nonprofit organisation TeachAids to voice educational animations about HIV/AIDS protection in English, Hindi, and Urdu. Javed Akhtar advised TeachAids for the animation's Urdu script.

Azmi was also a member of the National AIDS Commission (of India).

=== Statement of protest against Safdar Hashmi's murder ===
During the opening ceremony of the 12th International Film Festival of India (1989) at the Siri Fort auditorium in Delhi, organised by Information and Broadcasting Ministry, Azmi was asked onstage about directors, in her view, who had "brought out the best in her" as an actor. In response, she said, "My views on my directors and the new wave can be reserved for a later date. What is very important right now is that we've been distributing some leaflets in the audience. My fear is that not all the leaflets have been equally distributed. And so, I choose this occasion to read out our protest, please bear with me." As the audience applauded, she read a written statement calling out Indian National Congress (INC) for the murder of dramatist, cultural activist, and Communist Party of India (Marxist) member Safdar Hashmi. "We filmmakers and film lovers wish to register our protest against a system that on the one hand claims to promote creativity and on the other, connives in the murder of cultural activists," she said. Outside of the venue, actor Dilip Kumar stood in protest with Hashmi's photograph. Azmi's statement echoed similar sentiments expressed by her peers, including Satyajit Ray, Ravi Shankar, Adoor Gopalakrishnan, Utpal Dutt, Krishna Sobti and Rajendra Yadav, who engaged in "public displays of solidarity" in weeks following the murder.

H. K. L. Bhagat, the Minister of Information and Broadcasting at the time, was seen "refuting Azmi's allegations, but very few people in the audience appeared to take his word seriously." On 3 March 1989, during a Rajya Sabha session, Member of Parliament Chimanbhai Mehta requested Bhagat to clarify if an instruction had been issued to Doordarshan after Azmi's statement to prohibit her from appearing on the Doordarshan screen. Bhagat denied the existence of such instruction.

Azmi has continued to bring attention to Hashmi's murder over the years. In 2015, she and Akhtar attended the 26th Safdar Hashmi Memorial, organised by Sahmat, a Delhi-based activist and artist collective. On Hashmi's 31st Shahaadat Divas (Martyrdom Day) in 2020, the couple joined a gathering of artists and workers in Sahibabad district of Jhandapur, Uttar Pradesh, to celebrate his memory. The event marked the launch of Sudhanva Deshpande's HallaBol: The Death and Life of Safdar Hashmi (2020) published by LeftWord. Addressing the audience, Azmi recited lines from her father's and Akhtar's poetry. She also said that being in Ghaziabad was "special" because it reminded her of Hashmi, and of her own childhood spent accompanying her father to worker-rights meetings.

=== 1989 March against communalism ===
In 1989, along with Swami Agnivesh and Asghar Ali Engineer, Azmi undertook a four-day march for communal harmony from New Delhi to Meerut. Among the social groups whose causes she has advocated are slum dwellers, displaced Kashmiri Pandit migrants, and victims of the earthquake at Latur (Maharashtra, India). The 1993 Mumbai riots appalled her, and she emerged as a forceful critic of religious extremism. In 1995, she reflected on her life as an activist in an interview in Rungh. After the 11 September 2001 attacks, she opposed the advice of the grand mufti of Jama Masjid calling upon the Muslims of India to join the people of Afghanistan in their fight by retorting that the leader go there alone.

Since 1989, she has been a member of the National Integration Council headed by the Prime Minister of India, and was nominated (in 1997) as a member of the Rajya Sabha, the upper house of the Indian parliament in 1997.

In 2019 Indian general election, she actively campaigned for Kanhaiya Kumar who contested from Begusarai, Bihar on a Communist Party of India (CPI) ticket.

== Artistry and legacy ==
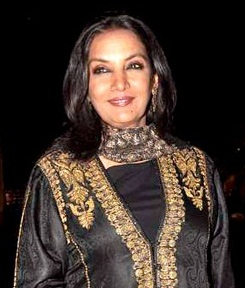
Azmi in 2012

Azmi is regarded as one of the greatest actors of Indian cinema. Rediff.com placed her as the seventh-greatest Indian actress of all time. In 2022, she was placed in Outlook India's 75 Best Bollywood Actresses list. Azmi was placed first in Rediff.com's "Best Bollywood Debut Ever" list, for her film Ankur. In 2023, Rajeev Masand named Azmi as one of Hindi cinema's best actresses of all time. Times of India placed her in its "50 Beautiful Faces" list.

Filmfare included Azmi's performances in Mandi and Arth in its list of "80 Iconic Performances" of Bollywood, placed 37th and 27th respectively. For Mandi, it noted, "Shabana is dramatic, she is quirky, and she's bang on. A natural, her carefully restrained performance makes you smile at her lament about professionalism and loyalty. Although she is supported by a sterling cast, this is a satire that is all hers. See her spirited performances in Morning Raga, Masoom and Ankur as well."

== Filmography ==
She has acted in more than one hundred Hindi films, both in the mainstream as well as in Parallel Cinema. Several of her films have received attention in the international arena and Scandinavian countries, including at the Norwegian Film Institute, the Smithsonian Institution and the American Film Institute. She has appeared in a number of foreign films, most of which have won international acclaim, including John Schlesinger's Madame Sousatzka, Nicholas Klotz's Bengali Night, Roland Joffe's City of Joy, Channel 4's Immaculate Conception, Blake Edwards' Son of the Pink Panther, and Ismail Merchant's In Custody.

== Accolades ==
=== Major associations and honours ===
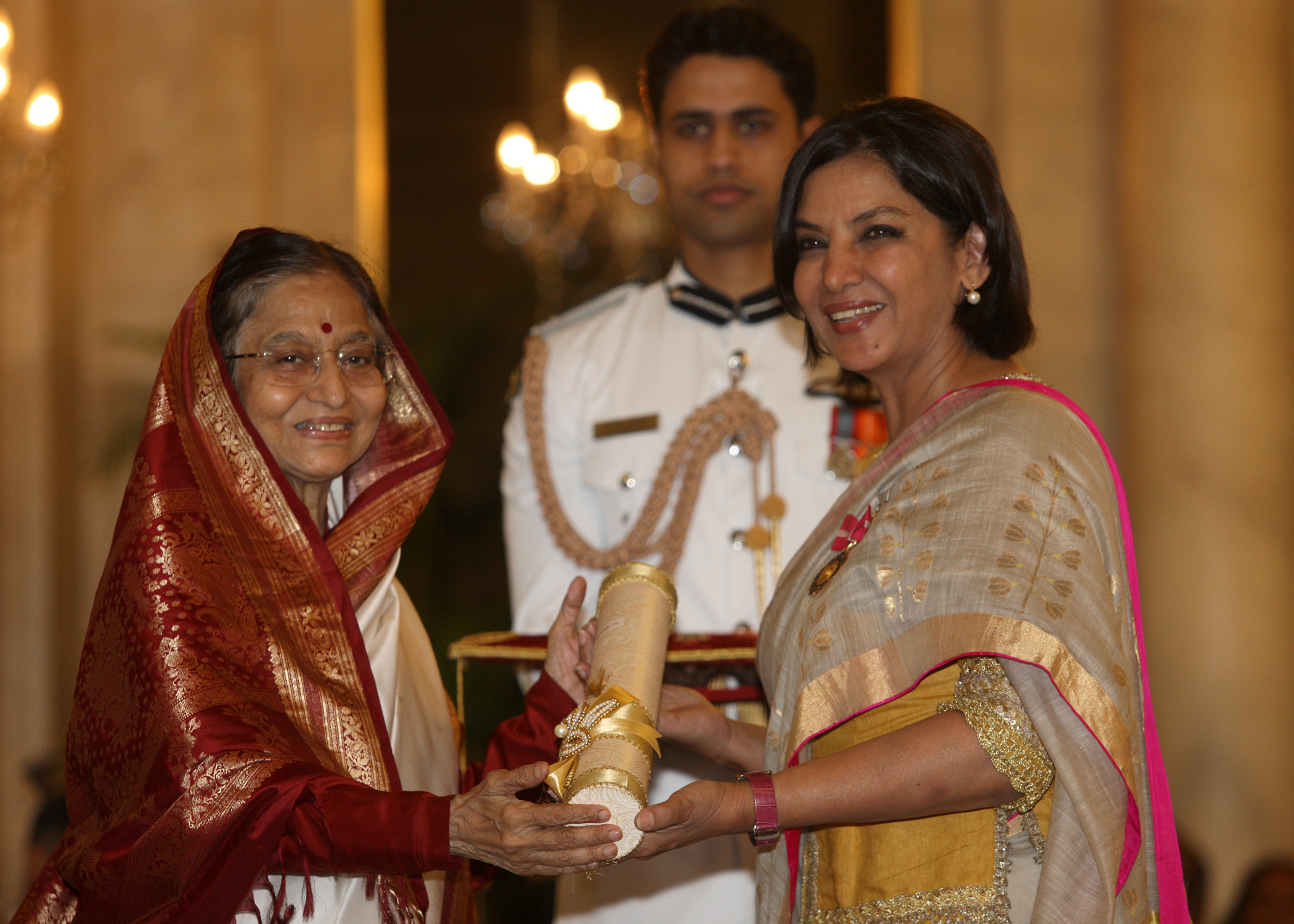
President Pratibha Patil giving Azmi the Padma Bhushan in 2012

Civilian award

- 1988: Awarded the Padma Shri by the Government of India.
- 2011: Awarded the Raj Kapoor Special Contribution Award by the Government of Maharashtra.
- 2012: Awarded the Padma Bhushan by the Government of India.

National Film Awards

Azmi has received the National Film Award for Best Actress five times, making her the overall most-awarded actor in the function:

Year	Category	Movie	Result
1975	Best Actress	Ankur	Won
1983	Best Actress	Arth	Won
1984	Best Actress	Khandhar	Won
1985	Best Actress	Paar	Won
1999	Best Actress	Godmother	Won

Filmfare Awards

Year	Category	Movie	Result
1975	Best Actress	Ankur	Nominated
1978	Best Actress	Swami	Won
1981	Best Actress	Thodisi Bewafaii	Nominated
1984	Best Actress	Arth	Won
1984	Best Actress	Masoom	Nominated
1984	Best Actress	Avtaar	Nominated
1984	Best Actress	Mandi	Nominated
1985	Best Actress	Bhavna	Won
1985	Best Actress	Sparsh	Nominated
2003	Best Villain	Makdee	Nominated
2004	Best Supporting Actress	Tehzeeb	Nominated
2006	Lifetime Achievement Award		Won
2017	Best Supporting Actress	Neerja	Won
2024	Best Supporting Actress	Ghoomer	Nominated
2024	Best Supporting Actress	Rocky Aur Rani Kii Prem Kahaani	Won

=== International awards ===
Year	Award/Country	Category	Movie	Result
1993	North Korea	Best Actress	Libaas	Won
1994	Taormina Arte Festival in Italy	Best Actress	Patang	Won
1996	Chicago International Film Festival	Silver Hugo Award for Best Actress	Fire	Won
1996	L.A. Outfest	Outstanding Actress in a Feature Film	Fire	Won

=== Miscellaneous awards and honours ===
Year	Award	Category	Movie	Result
1975	Bengal Film Journalists' Association Awards	Best Actress (Hindi)	Ankur	Won
1984	Bengal Film Journalists' Association Awards	Best Actress (Hindi)	Paar	Won
1987	Bengal Film Journalists' Association Awards	Best Actress (Hindi)	Ek Pal	Won
1998	Screen Awards	Best Supporting Actress	Mrityudand	Won
1999	Bengal Film Journalists' Association Awards	Best Actress (Hindi)	Godmother	Won
2003	Bengal Film Journalists' Association Awards	Best Supporting Actress (Hindi)	Tehzeeb	Won
2004	Zee Cine Awards	Best Supporting Actress	Tehzeeb	Won
2005	Screen Awards	Best Performance in an Indian Film in English	Morning Raga	Won

- 1999: Mumbai Academy of the Moving Image, Significant Contribution to Indian Cinema.
- 2002: Martin Luther King Professorship award by the University of Michigan conferred on her in recognition of her contribution to arts, culture and society.
- 2006: Gandhi International Peace Award, awarded by Gandhi Foundation, London.
- 2007: ANR National Award by the Akkineni International Foundation
- 2009: Honoured with the World Economic Forum's Crystal Award
- 2012: Honoured by Walk of the Stars as her hand print was preserved for posterity at Bandra Bandstand in Mumbai.
- 2013: Awarded the Honorary Fellowship by the National Indian Students Union UK
- 2018: Power Brands awarded Shabana Azmi the Bharatiya Manavata Vikas Puraskar for being one of the greatest and most versatile thespians of Indian cinema, for being a champion of women's education and a consistent advocate for civil and human rights, equality and peace and for empowering lives every day through the Mijwan Welfare Society.

National awards

- 1988: Yash Bhartiya Award by the Government of Uttar Pradesh for highlighting women's issues in her work as an actress and activist.
- 1994: Rajiv Gandhi Award for "Excellence of Secularism"

Honorary doctorates

- 2003: She was conferred with an honorary doctorate by the Jadavpur University in West Bengal in 2003.
- 2007: She was conferred with an honorary doctorate in art by Chancellor of the University Brandan Foster by the Leeds Metropolitan University in Yorkshire
- 2008: She was conferred with an honorary doctorate by the Jamia Milia Islamia in Delhi in 2008.
- 2013: She was conferred with an honorary doctorate by Simon Fraser University.
- 2014: She was conferred with an honorary doctorate by TERI University on 5 February 2014.
- 2025: Lifetime Achievement Award at 16th Bengaluru International Film Festival (BIFFes)
