= Sudipta Chakraborty =

Indian actress

Sudiptaa Chakraborty
- Born: Howrah, West Bengal, India
- Other name: Tumpa
- Occupation: Actress
- Known for: Bariwali
- Spouse(s): Rajesh Sharma (2005–2009); Avishek Saha (2014–present)
- Children: 1
- Parent: Biplab Ketan Chakraborty (father)
- Relatives: Bidipta Chakraborty (sister)

Sudipta Chakraborty is an Indian film and television actress who mostly works in Bengali cinema. She received the National Film Award for Best Supporting Actress for the film Bariwali.

Chakraborty made her Television debut in 1989. She gained wider recognition for her portrayal of Tista in Ravi Ojha's long-running soap opera Khela (2006) Chakraborty had participated as a contestant in the first season of Bigg Boss Bangla (2013), in which she was one of the top four finalists. She is also an anchor, talk show host, casting director, and an acting coach.

She completed her higher secondary education from Kendriya Vidyalaya, Fort William. She graduated with an Honours degree in English.

Her elder sisters Bidipta Chakraborty and Bidisha Chakraborty are also popular actresses. Sudipta made her debut in the film Sanghaat.

== Work ==
Films

- Sanghaat (Debut Film) (1997)
- Bariwali (2000) as Maloti
- Mondo Meyer Upakhyan (2002) as Basanti
- Robibaar Bikelbela (2004)
- Kalpurush (2005)
- Sangshoy (2006)
- Hitlist (2009)
- Urochithi (2011)
- Nobel Chor (2012)
- Abosheshey (2012)
- Half Serious (2013)
- C/O Sir (2013)
- Goynar Baksho (2013)as Kamala
- Namkaran - A short film Directed by Konkona Sen Sharma (2014)
- Open Tee Bioscope (2014) as Fowara's mother, Boishakhi
- Buno Haansh (2014) as Amal's sister-in-law
- Bheetu (2014)
- Chaar (2014)
- Rajkahini (2015) as Juthika
- Shororipu (2016)
- Dhananjay (2017) as Surabhi Parekh
- 61 Garpar Lane (2017)
- Mayurakshi (2017) as Mallika
- Uronchandi (2018) as Bindi
- Pupa (2018)
- Shobdokolpodroom (2018)
- Samsara (2019)
- Jyeshthoputro (2019) as Ila
- Basu Paribar (2019) as Pompi
- Porichoy (The Identity)
- Satyamev Jayate (Hindi) (2019)
- Chegue (2022)
- Shubho Noboborsho (Yet to release)
- Tritiyo (2022)
- A Separate Sky (2021)
- Haariye Jaoar Aage (Yet to release)
- Porshi (Yet to release)
- Haar Maana Haar (2022)
- Tritiyo (2022)
- Searching For Happiness (Yet to release)
- Manohar Pandey (Hindi) (Yet to release)
- The Scavenger of Dreams (Hindi)
- Maaya (yet to release)
- Bagha Jatin (2023) as Binodibala
- Bhootpori (2024) as Shilalipi
- Aapish (2025)
- Boro babu ( 2027)

Plays

(in alphabetical order)

- Baghu Manna
- Bikele Bhorer Shorshe Phool
- Kacher Dewal

Shruti Alekhya

- See You

== Television ==
- Nana Ronger Dinguli as Rai (ETV Bangla)
- Khela (Zee Bangla) as Tista (2007-2008)
- Binni Dhaner Khoi as Kurchi Majumdar (later replaced by Sohini Sanyal)
- Bigg Boss Bangla: 3rd Runner Up (ETV Bangla) (2013)
- Bou Kotha Kao (Star Jalsha)
- Konye Tui Megastar (Star Jalsha)
- Ranna Ghorer Goppo (Colors Bangla)
- Kon Kanon Er Phool
- Lakh Takar Lokhhi Labh Season 1 and Season 2(Sun Bangla) as Host (2024-2026)

== Web series ==
- Amra 2GayTher (2021)

== Awards ==
She also received various awards during her childhood days, for various theatre plays as Best Child Actor.

Year	Award	Category	Character	Film/TV show
1999	National Film Awards	Best Supporting Actress	Bariwali	Maloti
2001	BFJA	Best Supporting Actress	Bariwali	Maloti
2001	ETV Film Award	Best Supporting Actress	Bariwali	Maloti
2001	Kalakar Award	Best Rising Actress	Bariwali	Maloti
2000	Kalakar Award	Best News Caster	Khas Khobor	Anchor
2001	Anandalok Puraskar	Best Anchor	'Srimoti' (E TV Bangla)	Anchor
2005	Anandalok Puraskar	Best Make Over	'Manasi' (Akash Bangla)	
2005	Pratidin Tele Samman	Best Anchor	'Dhanni Meye' (Zee Bangla)	Anchor
2006	Pratidin Tele Samman, 2006	Best Performance in a Negative Role	Manasi (Akash Bangla)	
2007	Zee Bangla Gaurav Award	Best Actress	'Khela' (Zee Bangla)	
2012	Zee Bangla Gaurav Award	Best Actress	Stage play ‘Bikele Bhorer Shorshe Phool’	
2018	WBFJA	Best Actress	'Uronchondi'	Bindi
2019	WBFJA	Best Actress in a Negative role	'Dhananjay'	Surabhi Parekh
2020	WBFJA	Best Supporting Actress	'Jyeshthoputro'	Ila
2023	Udaan Group Award		'"BINODINI OPERA" play'	Noti Binodini
2025	TV 9 Bangla Ghorer Bioscope Awards	Best Reality Show	'Lakh Takar Lokkhi Labh'	Host
