= Barun Mukherji (cinematographer) =

Indian cinematographer

Barun Mukherjee is an Indian cinematographer who worked primarily in Hindi films.

== Filmography ==
Year	Movie	Language	Notes
1979	Savithri	Kannada	
1981	Gehrayee	Hindi	
1981	Chakra	Hindi	
1981	Raja Paarvai	Tamil Telugu	
1984	Aaj Ki Awaaz	Hindi	
1985	Dekha Pyar Tumhara	Hindi	
1996	Bhairavi	Hindi	
2003	Baghban	Hindi	
2006	Baabul	Hindi	
2007	Apna Asmaan	Hindi	
2009	Dwando	Bengali	
2013	Aashbo Aarek Din	Bengali	
2014	Kkoli: A Journey of Love	Bengali	
2015	Kadambari	Bengali	
2020	Exchange Offer	Hindi	
