= Genesis (1986 film) =

- French poster of the film.
- Directed by: Mrinal Sen
- Written by: Samaresh Basu (story); Mohit Chattopadhya
- Starring: Shabana Azmi; Naseeruddin Shah; Om Puri
- Cinematography: Carlo Varini
- Edited by: Elisabeth Waelchli
- Music by: Ravi Shankar
- Release date: 1986
- Running time: 105 minutes
- Country: India
- Language: Hindi

Genesis is a 1986 Indian Hindi-language film directed by Mrinal Sen. The film stars Shabana Azmi, Naseeruddin Shah and Om Puri. It was entered into the 1986 Cannes Film Festival. The film was produced by Mrinal Sen and a conglomerate of European Production Houses. It was shot entirely in a desert location in Rajasthan while most of the post-production was done in Europe. The music was composed by Pundit Ravi Shankar. The movie is based on the novel by Samaresh Basu.

== Plot ==
A farmer (Naseeruddin Shah) and a weaver (Om Puri) exchange their products for goods provided by a regular passing trader (M.K. Raina). A woman (Shabana Azmi) arrives, enamoring the two men but also urging them to obtain more recompense from the trader. After a visit to a village fair, the two men become more acquisitive and jealousies break out over the now pregnant woman who simply ups and leaves. As the two men fight each other, the trader's men attack and enslave the workers again.

== Cast ==
- Shabana Azmi as The Woman
- Naseeruddin Shah as The Farmer
- Om Puri as The Weaver
- M.K. Raina as The Trader
