= Mr. and Mrs. Iyer =

2002 film by Aparna Sen

- Theatrical release poster
- Directed by: Aparna Sen
- Written by: Aparna Sen
- Produced by: N. Venkatesan; Rupali Mehta
- Starring: Rahul Bose; Konkona Sen Sharma
- Cinematography: Goutam Ghose
- Edited by: Raviranjan Maitra
- Music by: Zakir Hussain
- Distributed by: MG Distribution; Tips Exports
- Release date: 19 July 2002
- Running time: 120 minutes
- Country: India
- Language: English
- Budget: ₹10 million

Mr. and Mrs. Iyer is a 2002 Indian drama film written and directed by Aparna Sen and produced by N. Venkatesan. The film features Sen's daughter Konkona Sen Sharma as Meenakshi Iyer, a Tamil Iyer Brahmin who is a Hindu. Rahul Bose portrays the character of Raja Chowdhury, a Bengali Muslim wildlife photographer. The story revolves around these two lead characters during a fateful bus journey amidst the carnages of a communal strife in India. Zakir Hussain composed the background score and music for the film and Goutam Ghose was the cinematographer. The film had English as its dominant language with a sporadic use of Hindi, Tamil, and Bengali.

Mr. and Mrs. Iyer premiered at the Locarno International Film Festival in Switzerland and was showcased at other prominent film festivals. The film opened to Indian audiences on 19 July 2002. It was met with critical acclaim upon release, and won several national and international awards, including the Golden Maile award at the Hawaii International Film Festival and the Nargis Dutt Award for Best Feature Film on National Integration in India.

== Plot ==
Meenakshi Iyer and her infant son, Santhanam, embark on a bus journey to return home, after visiting her parents. At the bus station, Meenakshi is introduced to Raja Chowdhury by a common friend. Raja, a wildlife photographer, is requested by Meenakshi's parents to look after their daughter and grandson during the journey. The passengers of the bus include a boisterous group of youngsters, two Sikh men, an elderly Muslim couple, a young couple high on romance, a mentally challenged boy and his mother, and some card-playing men. The bus faces a roadblock and the bus driver attempts a detour, but is stopped by traffic jam caused by sectarian violence between Hindus and Muslims in nearby areas.

Raja reveals his Muslim identity to Meenakshi. As someone who comes from a high caste and conservative Hindu Brahmin family, Meenakshi shudders at the very fact that during their travel she drank water offered by Raja, a Muslim. She is shocked and asks Raja to not touch her. Raja contemplates leaving the bus, but is forced to stay inside by the patrolling police, who declare a curfew due to the riot. After the police leaves to scout other areas, a rioting Hindu mob arrives and forcibly enters the bus. They begin interrogating passengers about their religious identities and when in doubt, they even resort to check if the person is circumcised.

In order to protect himself from them, one of the passengers, who is Jewish and hence circumcised, points to the old Muslim couple to divert the mob's attention. The mob's leader drags the old couple out of the bus. One of the teenagers resists this, but she is assaulted by the mob. As Raja attempts to rise in revolt, Meenakshi plants Santhanam on his lap, ordering him to hold the baby with an intent to shield Raja's Muslim identity. The mob asks about their identities, and Meenaksi tells the leader that she is Mrs. Iyer and Raja is her husband. After this chilling encounter, the passengers spend the night in the bus.

In the morning, the passengers trek to a nearby village to seek accommodation. Raja and Meenakshi, identifying themselves as Mr. and Mrs. Iyer, fail to find any accommodation. However, the police officer, who was patrolling the earlier evening, bails them out by providing shelter at an abandoned forest bungalow. They are provided with the single usable bedroom available in the bungalow. Meenakshi refuses to share the room with Raja, and curses herself for coming along with a stranger. Raja confronts her on her outdated prejudices about caste and religion. After a brief quarrel, Raja allows her the comfort of the bedroom and prefers to sleep outside. The next morning when Meenakshi does not find Raja, she gets worried and angry as to why he left Santhanam and her in such a place. Soon, she feels relieved to find Raja sleeping outside. After they reach a restaurant in the nearby village, they meet the teenagers from the bus. The girls are excited and curious to know about Meenaakshi and Raja's love story. To keep their farce alive, both of them cook up an impromptu story right from how they met till where they went for their honeymoon. During their stay at the bungalow, they discover each other's beliefs and understanding of religion. That night, as they witness a horrific murder by one of the mobs, a shocked Meenakshi is comforted by Raja.

The next day, they reach a railway station with the army's help. There, they board the train towards their destination. At their destination station, Kolkata, Meenakshi's husband, Mr. Iyer arrives to receive her and Santhanam. Meenakshi introduces Raja to her husband as Jehangir Chowdhury, a Muslim man who helped her (a Hindu woman) during the curfew. Raja hands over a camera roll to Meenakshi, containing the photos of their journey; they bid an emotional farewell to each other.

== Cast ==
- Konkona Sen Sharma as Meenakshi S. Iyer – A traditional Tamil Iyer Brahmin traveling with her son, Santhanam, in the bus on her way to meet her husband. She meets a fellow-traveler, Raja Chowdhury, and gets drawn to him due to the surrounding circumstances.
- Rahul Bose as Jehangir "Raja" Chowdhury – A liberal Muslim by faith, he is a wildlife photographer by profession. With the imminent danger from the rioters, Meenakshi contrives a protective identity for him as her husband.
- Bhisham Sahni as Iqbal Ahmed Khan – An elderly conservative Muslim traveling along with his wife, Najma. He ends up as one of the victims of the sectarian violence.
- Surekha Sikri as Najma Ahmed Khan – The dutiful and loving wife of Iqbal, Najma perishes in the riots when she comes in defence of her husband.
- Anjan Dutt as Cohen – He is responsible for diverting the attention of the Hindu mob, in self-defence, towards the old Muslim couple. Thereafter, he is petrified thinking that he may also have been killed by the mob who could wrongly identify him as a Muslim, since he is circumcised.
- Bharat Kaul as Rajesh Arora – The police officer responsible for controlling and maintaining the law and order in the riot-stricken area. He gets acquainted with the bus passengers and helps the Iyer 'couple' find a place to stay during the curfew.
- Niharika Seth, Riddhi Basu, Richa Vyas, Eden Das, Jishnu Sengupta as Khushbu, Mala, Sonali, Amrita, Akash – An enthusiastic young group of friends riding the bus.

== Production ==
=== Development ===
Aparna Sen, a noted actress and director of Bengali cinema, made her debut as a director with the English film 36 Chowringhee Lane (1981). Mr. and Mrs. Iyer was her second film in English. She hoped to write a simple romantic story, but it shaped out to be a relationship drama in the backdrop of sectarian violence. Sen came up with the background of the story in the aftermath of 9/11 and the 2002 Gujarat riots. In an interview, Sen stated that the omnipresent, circumstantial violence in the film was only to serve as a strain in the script which aimed to show how the relationship evolves between two people who are forced to be together under trying times. She stated that the time frame of the film was set after the attacks on the Parliament of India on 13 December 2001.

In an interview at the screening at the Locarno Film Festival, Sen revealed that Konkona was involved in the pre-production research, and she suggested the title. About the cinematographer Gautam Ghose, Aparna Sen said that they had a good rapport and that Ghose, himself an acclaimed director, was one of the best cinematographers she knew. Ghose, in reply, said that he hoped to give his best for the film and thus contribute to their friendship.

=== Casting ===
Rahul Bose's work in English, August (1994) and Split Wide Open (1999) made Aparna Sen feel that he was a good, controlled and intelligent actor. After a costume and a makeup test, he was chosen for the character of Raja Chawdhury. Sen admitted that Bose's work was up to the mark, and working with him was a wonderful experience. She told in an interview that Konkona Sen Sharma's abilities as a sensitive actress fetched her the role of Meenakshi Iyer. Konkona said that she chose this film as she was interested in Indian films made in English, and was reluctant to do regular commercial films. Sen had penned the elderly Muslim woman's character bearing Surekha Sikri in mind. Eventually Sikri and the author and playwright Bhisham Sahni were cast to play the roles of the Muslim couple in the film. Santhanam, the infant son of Meenakshi Iyer in the film is Sen's grand niece.

Aparna Sen chose English as the film's narrative since the characters are linguistically diverse. She had to make sure that the characters spoke in English with their regional accent. Konkona admitted in an interview that playing the role of a Tamil Brahmin did not come easy. The director forced her to visit Chennai (where the major language is Tamil) for two weeks to research her character. She also said that she had learned many characteristics, nuances and mannerisms native to Tamilian housewives. She took a close look at Iyer lifestyles and customs in and around Mylapore, a cultural hub in Chennai. She attempted listening to recorded conversations in Iyer households to get a suitable Tamil accent.

=== Filming ===
The production commenced in December 2001. Sen chose to keep the geographical setting unstated because she felt that it was a journey that could take place anywhere. The film was shot in the Himalayan foothills of northern West Bengal. The producers provided a state-of-the-art camera from Chennai's Prasad Studios to ensure that the shooting crew was technically better equipped. Rupali Mehta, from Triplecom Productions, the co-producer oversaw the crew of over 100 complete the production schedule in 50 days. The production team resorted to certain cost-cutting measures to ensure they committed fewer mistakes. For example, they had organised a workshop for the actors to avoid mistakes while filming.

While filming in Jalpaiguri, Sen got embroiled in a controversy for damages caused to the forest bungalow, a heritage property, where a portion of filming was done. She admitted that, to give the bungalow a haunted look, they "... sprayed slush on the walls and plastered cobwebs all over the place." However, she claimed that the place was cleaned up after the completion of their shoot.

== Release and reception ==
Following objections from the local police, two scenes were removed by producers from the version of the film screened in the city of Mumbai. One scene showed a Hindu man saying—using profanity—that Muslims should be sent back to Pakistan; the other featured a policeman using obscenities with a communal undertone. The police felt both scenes were too "provocative" for a "communally sensitive" city. However, for the rest of India, the film was screened in its entirety.

Thanks to its low budget and the spread of multiplexes in India, it brought in some revenue. Furthermore, the contemporary trend in the Indian television channels is to showcase films within months of their release. This trend helped modest box-office successes such as Mr. and Mrs. Iyer to get additional thrust to their financial returns. Indeed, Mr. and Mrs. Iyer was one of the first films that led to reworking of the business models for small films in India. In addition, Triplecom Productions sold the dubbed version in Italy for $20,000. A trade analysis by Rediff.com suggested that small-budget films such as Mr. and Mrs. Iyer did not compromise on marketing budgets, instead they put efforts in marketing themselves more innovatively.

=== Special screenings and awards ===
In 2002, Mr. and Mrs. Iyer was chosen as India's official entry at the Locarno International Film Festival. It ran for 3 minutes longer than its runtime of 120 minutes at Locarno. Though it missed out on the Golden Leopard Award at Locarno, it won the Netpac Jury Prize along with two other films. The film won the Golden Maile award at the 22nd Hawaii International Film Festival, the Audience Award for the Best Feature Film at the Philadelphia Film Festival, and the best screenplay award at the 2003 Cinemanila International Film Festival.

In 2003, the Indian Film Festival of Los Angeles chose to open with Mr. and Mrs. Iyer, while New Zealand's first Asian film festival in 2004 chose to close its 10-day fest with it. The India International Women's Film Festival had a special retrospective to Aparna Sen for Mr. and Mrs. Iyer. The film was also showcased at the Pusan International Film Festival, Regus London Film Festival, Mill Valley Film Festival, International Film Festival of India, Braunschweig International Film Festival, and High Falls Film Festival. At the International Film Festival of Las Palmas in the Canary Islands, it won the Gold prize, awarded to the best film screened that year. Rahul Bose said that when the film was showcased at the Geneva festival, it was seen and liked by Kofi Annan, the United Nations Secretary-General.

Back home in India, Mr. and Mrs. Iyer won the Golden Lotus Award for best direction, the Silver Lotus Awards for best actress, the best screenplay, and the Nargis Dutt Award for Best Feature Film on National Integration at the 2003 National Film Awards ceremony.

Govind Nihalani, an Indian film director wondered if Mr. and Mrs. Iyer could have been sent to the Oscars instead of the regular song-and-dance entries. Eventually, Film Federation of India, the apex organisation that sends the nation's official entries to the Oscars, did not find any film worth sending for the 76th Academy Awards.

=== Reviews ===
Lawrence van Gelder commented in his review in The New York Times that "The well-acted romance, as the two principal characters are thrown together by unanticipated events, is hard to resist, even though the answer to the crucial question it raises is all too conveniently deferred time and again." However, he added that Mr. and Mrs. Iyer "... is not a subtle film ..." The Chicago Reader also said, "Sen is anything but subtle in populating the bus with a cross section of class and ethnic types ... but the friendship that blossoms between the leads is tenderly depicted and hints at a solution to sectarian strife" TIME magazine praised Aparna sen for her "... attention to detail ..." that "... skillfully captures the characters' idiosyncrasies." The Village Voice said, "The actors appear game, yet director Aparna Sen, who conceived the film in the wake of September 11, resorts often to hokey pseudo-lyricism and prefers sound-bite ballyhoo to sociological depth." Metacritic, a website with a medley of reviews by American critics, gives the film a score of 50/100, meaning mixed or average reviews.

In his review, Derek Elley of Variety remarked that the film had "... the awkward, issue-driven dialogue and wavering direction, showing influences from both the arty and commercial. [The] two leads just about scrape through." Although The Hindu review praised the director for "... handling (these) scenes in an understated, muted fashion ..." giving "... them the power to disturb and haunt you." it questioned certain aspects of the film, stating, "Though the flutters of the heart have been treated with finesse—sometimes a little too prudishly, pandering, perhaps, to middle class morality—we are never entirely convinced that love could blossom between Meenakshi Iyer and Raja Chowdhary." Indeed, Sen was criticised for contriving cinematic situation not quite fitting to the real world, "Can a married woman with a baby in arms fall in love with a total stranger that she meets on a very short bus journey, however extraordinary the situation may have been? Having decided to drive them to each other's arms, Sen thinks up situations, which are terribly contrived ... Sen's story and script are found wanting elsewhere too. The police officer, who plays the good Samaritan, appears so unreal in the world of rancour that Sen creates ... [She], probably in her over enthusiasm, lets her own emotions derail her."

Konkona Sen Sharma, who had not been widely seen outside Bengal before the release of the film, received particular praise for her performance, "... the movie clearly belongs to Konkona Sen Sharma ... who as Meenakshi [Iyer] gets so beautifully into the psyche of a Tamil Brahmin ... she emotes just splendidly: when her eyes well up at the thought of parting with Raja [Chowdhary], when she gently rests her head on his shoulders in the train, and when her expressions suggest the faintest hint of love, we know that here is a great actress." A Rediff.com review said, "... Konkana, a youngster, bowls you over with her silently sledge-hammering portrayal of Meenakshi Iyer, a conservative Tamilian Brahmin housewife ... [Her] eyes tell a thousand untold stories." An Australian critic said that the film, with "wonderfully nuanced performances by Sensharma and Rahul Bose, whose love affair is as innocent as the lyrical, lingering soundtrack. Mr and Mrs Iyer is a gentle film, whose simple and haunting love story will appeal to the romantic traveller."

The "... attractive lensing by Gautam Ghose (a director in his own right) and atmospheric scoring by Ustad Zakir Hussain ..." were well received. "Looking through the eyes of Gautam Ghose's illuminating lens, Aparna Sen builds a miniature, but epic, world of tremendous inner strength. In her first seriously politically committed film, Sen takes on the issue of communal conflict with the surging humanism of Gabriel García Márquez, painting words on celluloid ... If [Zakir] Hussain creates sounds within the seesaw of silences and screams, cinematographer Gautam Ghose creates a lucid contrast between the silently majestic Himalayan hinterland and the fundamentalists."

== Home media ==
=== DVD ===
The DVD, which released on 2 June 2004, has subtitle options in English, Hindi, Punjabi, Tamil and Urdu. It is available in 16:9 Anamorphic widescreen, Dolby Digital 5.1 Surround, progressive 24 FPS, widescreen and NTSC format.

=== Soundtrack ===
Ustad Zakir Hussain composed music for the film. For the first time in mainstream cinema, he sang for one part of a song. He said this in an interview and added that it was only after the track was recorded, the producers decided to go for Hussain's voice. Rahul Bose, who introduced Hussain to Aparna and Konkona, was instrumental in influencing Hussain to compose the background score for the film.
