= Aparna Sen =

Indian filmmaker, script writer and actress

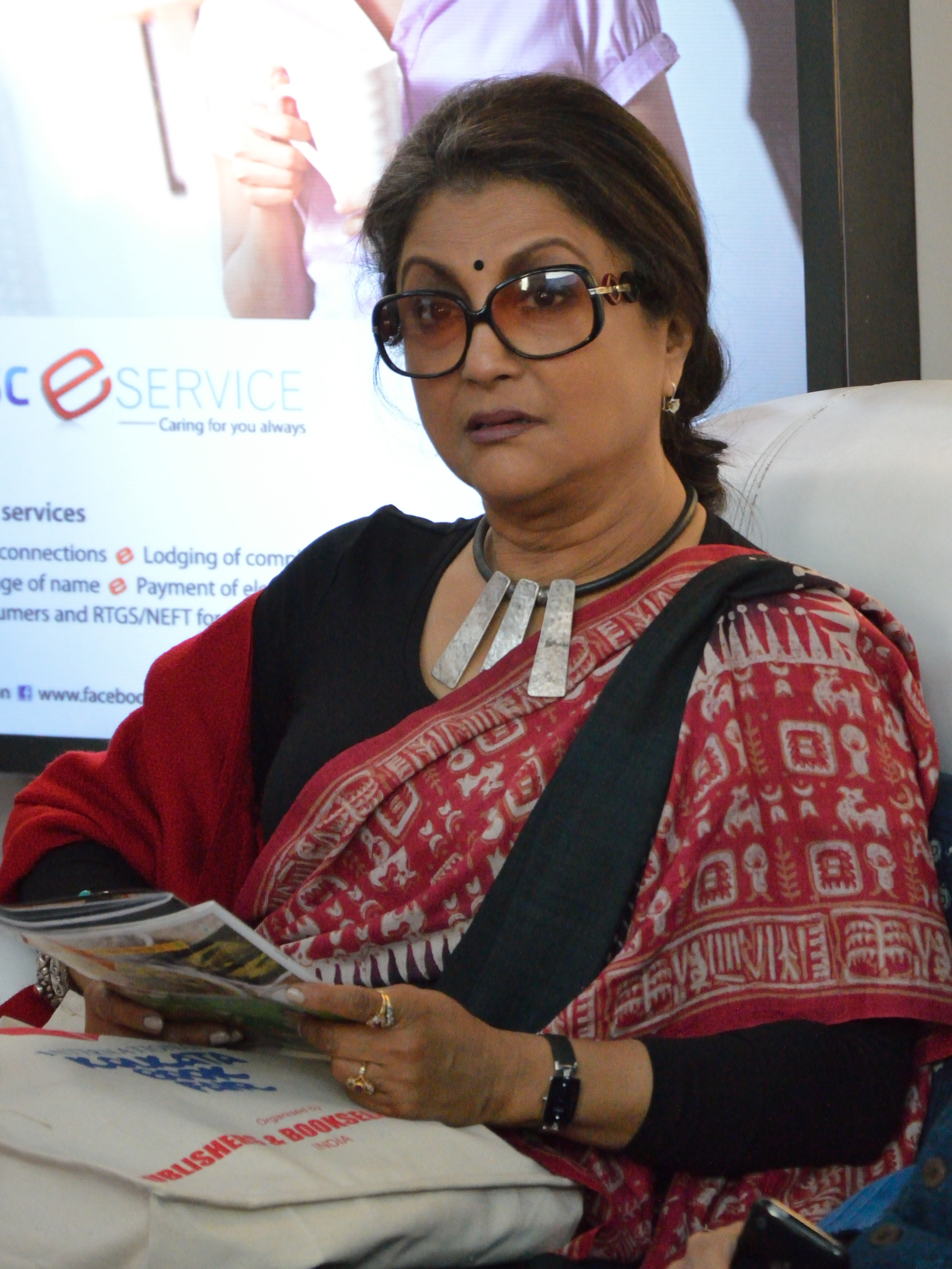
- Sen at the 38th IKBF in 2014
- Born: Aparna Dasgupta; 25 October 1945 (age 81); Calcutta, Bengal Presidency, British India
- Occupations: Actress; director; screenwriter
- Years active: 1961–present
- Works: Filmography
- Spouses: Sanjay Sen; Mukul Sharma; Kalyan Ray
- Children: Konkona Sen Sharma and Dona Sen

Aparna Sen (Bengali: [ɔpoɾna ʃen]; née Dasgupta) is an Indian film director, screenwriter and actress who is known for her work in Bengali cinema. She has received several accolades as an actress and filmmaker, including nine National Film Awards, six Filmfare Awards East and thirteen Bengal Film Journalists' Association Awards. For her contribution in the field of arts, the Government of India honoured her with Padma Shri, the country's fourth highest civilian award.

== Early life and education ==
Sen was born in a Bengali family in Kolkata. Her family originally hailed from Cox's Bazar in Chittagong District (now in Bangladesh). Her father was the veteran critic and filmmaker Chidananda Dasgupta. Her mother Supriya Dasgupta was a costume designer and earned the National Film Award for Best Costume Design for Chidananda's directorial venture Amodini (1994), at the age of 73. Sen is a maternal niece of Bengali poet Jibanananda Das. Sen spent her childhood in Hazaribagh and Kolkata and had her schooling at Modern High School for Girls, Ballygunge, Kolkata. She studied for her B.A. in English at Presidency College, but did not complete the degree.

== Career ==
=== Actor ===
Sen's foray into the world of entertainment happened when she was fifteen and was photographed by Brian Brake for the well-known photo from his 1960 Monsoon series of photographs; the photo appeared on the cover of Life.

Sen made her film debut at the age of 16 when she played the role of Mrinmoyee in the Samapti portion of the 1961 film Teen Kanya (lit. 'Three Daughters') directed by Satyajit Ray (who was a longtime friend of her father's). She went on to appear in up to four films made by the director including, Jana Aranya, and Pikoo.

Four years after her first film, in 1965, Sen acted in Akash Kusum, a Mrinal Sen film where she played the part of Monica. Sen has been an eminent part of the Bengali film industry, playing the lead in popular films like Basanta Bilap (1973) and Memsaheb (1972) amongst others. Sen has also been a part of Hindi films such as Imaan Dharam (1977), Ek Din Achanak (1989), and Ghaath (2000).

In 2009, Sen appeared with Sharmila Tagore and Rahul Bose in Annirudh Roy-Chowdhary's Bengali film Antaheen. The film went on to win four National Film Awards. In 2019, Sen acted in prominent Bengali films including Bohomaan and Basu Poribar.

=== Director ===
Aparna Sen made her debut as a writer-director with 36 Chowringhee Lane (1981). Produced by Shashi Kapoor, the movie received immense critical acclaim and won Aparna her first National Film Award for Best Direction. In 2009, Sen announced her next Bengali film Iti Mrinalini, which starred herself, Konkona Sen Sharma, Rajat Kapoor, Kaushik Sen, and Priyanshu Chatterjee. First-time screenwriter Ranjan Ghosh co-wrote the film. This was the first time that Sen collaborated with any film writer or became attached to the curriculum of a film institute. The screenplay of Iti Mrinalini was an assignment in the Screenwriting syllabus at the Mumbai-based film school Whistling Woods International. It was also a major first in Indian screenwriting, as the first time that any screenplay from an Indian film institute was actually filmed. The film was released on 29 July 2011.

In 2013, her film Goynar Baksho (The Jewellery Box) was released depicting three generations of women and their relationship to a box of jewels. It ran to packed houses and won critical acclaim from reviewers and critics. Thereafter, in 2015, Arshinagar, an adaptation of Romeo and Juliet was released.

In 2017, Sonata—an English film written and directed by Sen—was released. Adapted from a play by Mahesh Elkunchwar, the film examines the life of three middle-aged unmarried friends played by Aparna Sen, Shabana Azmi and Lillete Dubey.

In 2021, she directed her 3rd Hindi film The Rapist, starring her daughter Konkona Sen Sharma and Arjun Rampal. In her interview with Firstpost, she said that The Rapist will be a "hard-hitting drama that examines how much of society is responsible for producing rapists". The film was nominated for the Kim Jiseok award at the 26th Busan International Film Festival held in October 2021. Her filmmaking style was highly influenced by Tapan Sinha.

== Awards ==
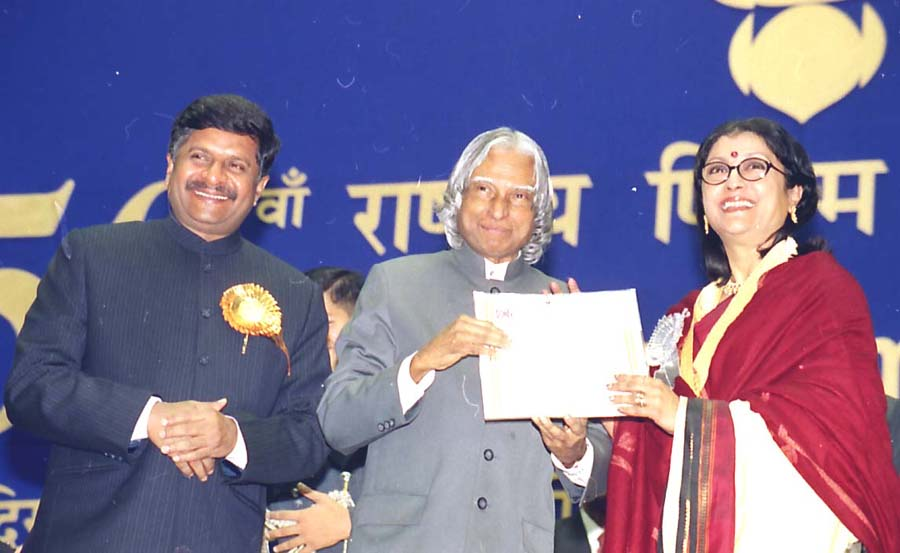
Aparna Sen receiving the Best Direction Award for the year 2002 from then-President of India A. P. J. Abdul Kalam.

- Padma Shri – the fourth highest civilian award by the Government of India in 1987.
- National Film Award for Best Direction for 36 Chowringhee Lane in 1981
- National Film Award for Best Feature Film in English for36 Chowringhee Lane in 1981.
- National Film Award for Best Feature Film in Bengali for Paroma in 1984.
- National Film Award for Best Feature Film in Bengali for Yugant in 1995.
- National Film Award for Best Feature Film in Bengali, for Paromitar Ek Din in 2000.
- National Film Award for Best Direction for Mr. and Mrs. Iyer in 2002.
- Nargis Dutt Award for Best Feature Film on National Integration for Mr. and Mrs. Iyer in 2002.
- National Film Award for Best Screenplay for Mr. and Mrs. Iyer in 2002.
- National Film Award for Best Feature Film in English for 15 Park Avenue in 2005.
- Karlovy Vary International Film Festival
- Filmfare Awards East – Best Actress Award for Sujata in 1974.
- Filmfare Awards East – Best Actress Award for Asamaya in 1976.
- Filmfare Awards East – Best Actress Award for Bijoyini in 1982.
- Filmfare Awards East – Best Actress Award for Indira in 1983.
- Filmfare Awards East – Best Director Award for Parama in 1985.
- BFJA Award-Best Actress Award for Aparachito in 1970
- BFJA Award-Best Actress Award for Sujata in 1975
- BFJA Award-Best Director Award for Parama in 1986
- BFJA Award-Best Screenplay Award for Parama in 1986
- BFJA Award-Best Actress Award for Ekanto Apan in 1988
- BFJA Award-Best Supporting Actress Award for Mahaprithibi in 1992
- BFJA Award-Best Actress Award for Swet Patharer Thala in 1993
- BFJA Award-Best Supporting Actress Award for Unishr April in 1997
- BFJA Award- Babulal Chowkhani Memorial Trophy for Original Story-Yugant in 1997
- BFJA Award-Best Actress Award for Paramitar Ek Din in 2001
- BFJA Award- Babulal Chowkhani Memorial Trophy for Original Story and Screenplay forParamitar Ek Din in 2001
- BFJA Award-Most Outstanding Work of the Year for Mr. and Mrs. Iyer in 2003
- BFJA Award-Life Time Achievement Award in 2013
- Anandalok Award-Best Actress for Paromitar Ek Din in 2001
- Anandalok Award-Best Actress for "Titlee" in 2002
- Kalakar Award-Best Actress (Stage) Award for Bhalo Kharab Meye in 1993
- Kalakar Awards for Best Director for Paromitar Ek Dinin 2000.
- Kalakar Award-Best Director Award for Iti Mrinalini in 2012
- Best Director Award at Indian Film Festival of Melbourne for The Rapist in 2022
- Filmfare Awards East Life Achievement Award in 2022.

== Honours ==
Sen has served on juries at film festivals around the world. In 1989 she was a member of the jury at the 16th Moscow International Film Festival. In 2008, she was elected into the International Jury of the Asia Pacific Screen Awards. In 2013, she headed the jury of the second Ladakh International Film Festival.

From 1986 to 2005, Sen was the editor of the fortnightly Sananda, a Bengali women's magazine (published by the Ananda Bazar Patrika group) that enjoys equal popularity in West Bengal and Bangladesh. From November 2005 to December 2006, she was associated with the Bengali infotainment channel Kolkata TV as Creative Director. In 2011 she became the editor of the magazine Paroma launched by the Saradha Group. Following the Saradha Group financial scandal, Paroma ran into trouble, and closed down in 2013. Sen and her editorial team launched a new magazine called Prathama Ekhon, which was short-lived.

In 1987, the then President of India, Giani Zail Singh bestowed the Padma Shri on Sen in recognition of her contribution to Indian cinema. Since then, she has received several lifetime achievement awards.

== Bibliography ==
- Parama and other outsiders: the cinema of Aparna Sen, by Shoma A. Chatterji. Parumita Publications, 2002. ISBN 81-87867-03-5.
- Aparna Sen calls the shots (Women in Indian film), by Rajashri Dasgupta. Zubaan, 2009.
