= Parama (film) =

- Poster of Parama, featuring Rakhee Gulzar
- Directed by: Aparna Sen
- Written by: Aparna Sen
- Starring: Raakhee; Aparna Sen; Deepankar Dey; Mukul Sharma
- Cinematography: Ashok Mehta
- Music by: Bhaskar Chandavarkar
- Release date: 9 June 1985
- Running time: 139 minutes
- Country: India
- Languages: Hindi and Bengali

Paroma (English title: The Ultimate Woman) is an Indian Bengali feature film directed by Aparna Sen. The film was released in 1985 under the banner of Usha Enterprise.

== Plot ==
The movie is about a 40-year-old married woman, Paroma whose identity lies in the words like "bouma" (the daughter-in-law), "kaki maa" (paternal aunt) and "boudi" (brother's wife). Her well-settled, very normal and predictable life turns upside down when Rahul, an expatriate photo-journalist working for a magazine chooses her to pose for a photo essay, "An Indian Housewife". It begins with a simple question, "What do you think, Paroma?". Through Rahul, Paroma rediscovers herself. His photographs of her make her look glamorous. Their affair or rather her discovery of herself, becomes a problem when some of the photographs, earlier admired by the family, are published in a journal (the semi nude photographs that were published were never shown to the family, Rahul deceived her by publishing those photographs without her consent). Paroma is rejected by her husband and has a mental breakdown. She tries to commit suicide cutting her vein but she ends up hitting her head in the bathroom. She has to undergo a surgery for which she had to cut her hair. She is taken care of by a nurse appointed by her family members. Though the family members decides to forgive her she is reluctant to go back to her old life. In the end, a doctor suggests prescribing psychiatric treatment and the family is willing to accept her back, but Paroma adamantly refuses any sense of guilt, turning to her friend and asking her if she can help her find a job. In the end she finally recalls the name of the flower which throughout the movie she was not able to recall. The movie closes with Parama and her daughter on the bed looking out through the window as a breeze comes into the room.

== Cast ==
- Raakhee as Paroma
- Mukul Sharma as Rahul
- Deepankar Dey
- Anil Chatterjee
- Sandhyarani
- Aparna Sen
- Shakuntala Barua
- Mahua Roychoudhury
- Chaiti Ghoshal
- Kalyani Mandal
- Bharati Devi
- Chhanda Chatterjee
- Geeta Dey
- Nilima Das
- Gouri Ghosh
- Arijit Guha

== Awards ==
1986 National Film Awards

- Silver Lotus Award - Best Supporting Actor - Deepankar De
- National Film Award for Best Feature Film in Bengali
