= Paromitar Ek Din =

2000 Indian Bengali-language film

- DVD cover for Paromitar Ek Din.
- Directed by: Aparna Sen
- Written by: Aparna Sen
- Starring: Rituparna Sengupta; Aparna Sen; Soumitra Chatterjee
- Cinematography: Abhik Mukhopadhyay
- Edited by: Arghyakamal Mitra
- Music by: Jyotishka Dasgupta
- Release date: 8 January 2000
- Running time: 130 mins
- Country: India
- Language: Bengali

Paromitar Ek Din (transl. One day of Paromita, English title: House of Memories) is a 2000 Indian Bengali drama film directed by Aparna Sen.

== Plot ==
The film explores the dual themes of friendship and loneliness. The film starts at Sanaka's funeral where Paromita is invited too. Paromita goes into a flashback where it is shown that she was previously married to Sanaka's younger son, Biru. The mother-in-law and daughter-in-law duo, Sanaka (Aparna Sen) and Paromita (Rituparna Sengupta), despite differences in age, backgrounds and temperaments, build a strong bond. But when Paromita's marriage to Biru breaks down, social mores prevent the women from remaining close friends. While Paromita marries Rajeev Shrivastav and begins a new life, her mother-in-law, Sanaka, is left heartbroken and alone and eventually falls seriously ill. When Paromita learns of her friend's deterioration, she is compelled to flout convention, and returns to nurse Sanaka on her deathbed. Sanaka dies, leaving her family shattered. The flashback ends, Paromita leaves the funeral and realizes that she and Rajeev are expecting their first child.

== Cast ==
- Aparna Sen as Sanaka Sanyal (Debu, Biru and Sanjukta's mother)
- Rituparna Sengupta as Paromita Sanyal (Biru's wife)
- Sohini Sengupta as Sanjukta (Khuku)
- Soumitra Chatterjee as Moni Biswas (Moni-daa or Moni-mama)
- Rajatava Dutta as Biru Sanyal (Paromita's husband and Sanaka's younger son)
- Rita Koiral as Sanaka's elder daughter in law (Debu's wife)
- Rajesh Sharma as Rajeev Shrivastav (Paromita's second husband)
- Dulal Lahiri
- Kaushik Banerjee as Debu Sanyal (Paromita's brother in law and Sanaka's older son)
- Ratna Sarkar
- Konkona Sen Sharma (Cameo)

== Awards ==
The film had won many national and international awards –

- 2000 – Ecumenical Jury Award at the 35th International Film festival of Karlovy Vary
- 2000 – Best Film recommendation from the FIPRESCI Jury at 3rd International Film Festival of Mumbai
- 2000 – National Film Award for Best Supporting Actress for Sohini Sengupta
- 2000 – National Film Award for Best Feature Film in Bengali
- 2000 – National Film Award for Best Female Playback Singer – Jayashree Dasgupta – "Hridoy Amar Prokash Holo..."
