= List of works by Roopa Ganguly =

Roopa Ganguly filmography
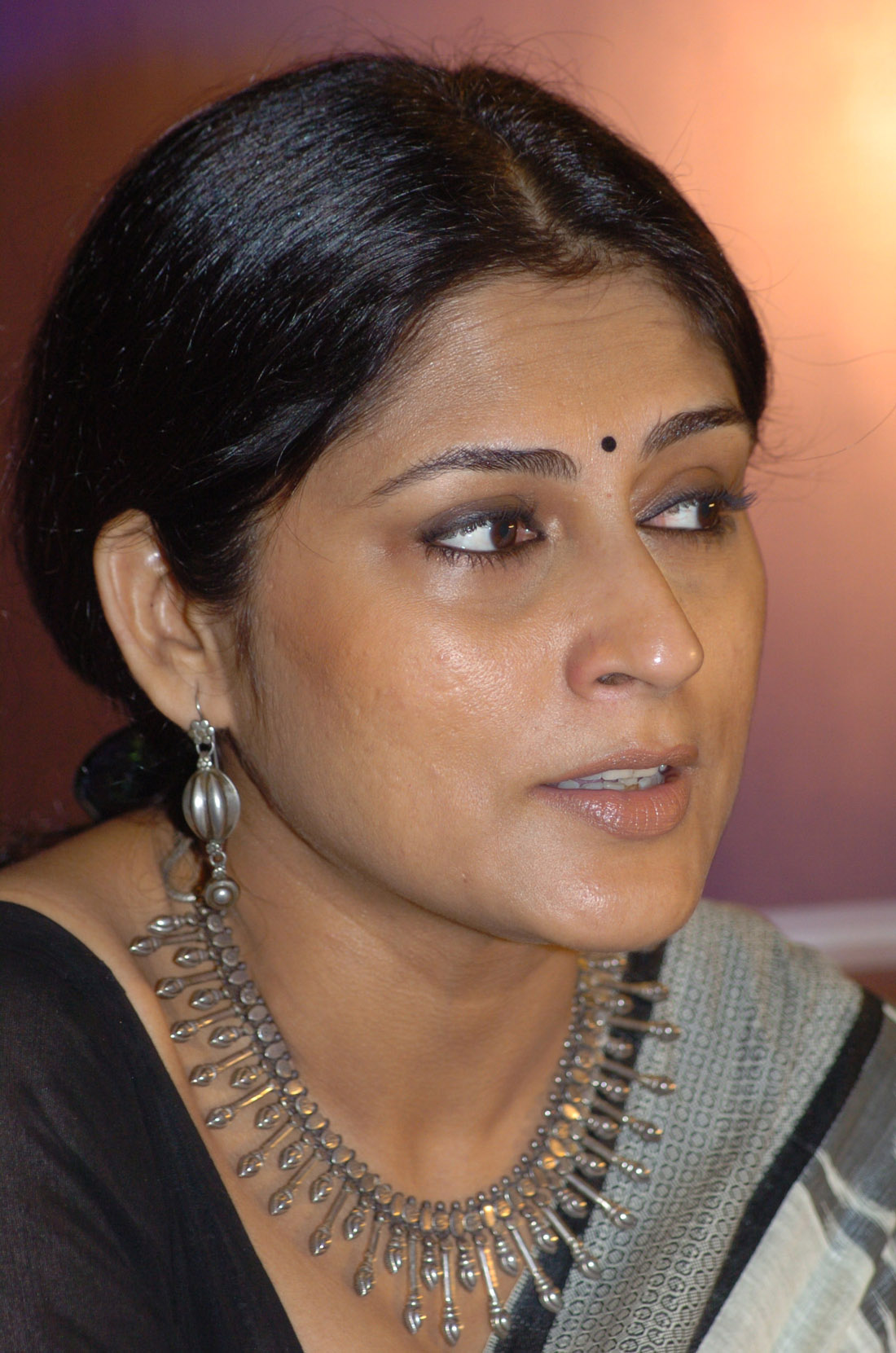
- Ganguli in 2005
- Film: 70+
- Television film: 20+
- Television series: 40+
- Radio show: 1
- Music videos: 1

Roopa Ganguly is an Indian actress and playback singer and politician. She made her acting debut with Bijoy Chatterjee's Hindi telefilm Nirupama (1986) based on Rabindranath Tagore's Bengali short story Dena Paona. She rose to wider fame for her role as Mrinal in Soumitra Chatterjee's directorial venture Stree Ki Patra (1986) which was also based on Tagore's Bengali short story Streer Patra.

== Films ==
Key
†	Denotes films that have not yet been released

=== English films ===
Year	Title	Director	Notes	Ref.
2004	Bow Barracks Forever	Anjan Dutt		
2012	Chaurahen	Rajshree Ojha		

=== Italian film ===
Year	Title	Role	Director	Notes	Ref.
1996	Vrindavan Film Studios	Annapurna	Lamberto Lambertini		

=== Hindi films ===
Year	Title	Director	Notes	Ref.
1989	Ek Din Achanak	Mrinal Sen		
1989	Kamla Ki Maut	Basu Chatterjee		
1990	Bahaar Aane Tak	Tariq Shah		
1991	Inspector Dhanush	Tulsi Ramsay; Shyam Ramsay		
1991	Meena Bazar	P. Chandrakumar		
1991	Pyar Ka Devta	K. Bapayya		
1991	Saugandh	Raj Sippy		
1992	Nishchaiy	Esmayeel Shroff	Special appearance	
1992	Virodhi	Rajkumar Kohli		
1994	Gopalaa	Akash Jain		
2008	Dashavatar			
2009	Luck	Dhillin Mehta	Special appearance	
2012	Barfi!	Anurag Basu		
2013	Mahabharat Aur Barbareek	Dharmesh Tiwari	Played Draupadi	
2014	Children of War	Mrityunjay Devrat		
2014	Kuku Mathur Ki Jhand Ho Gayi	Aman Sachdeva		
2015	Ek Adbhut Dakshina Guru Dakshina	Kiran Phadnis		
2016	Aman Ke Farishtey	Kader Kashmiri	Delayed release	
2017	Main Khudiram Bose Hun	Manoj Giri		
	Sonagachi †	Sudipto Chattopadhyay		

=== Bengali films ===
Year	Title	Director	Notes	Ref.
1988	Pratik	Prabhat Roy		
1989	Agnitrishna	Prabhat Roy		
1989	Amanat	Shantanu Bhowmik		
1989	Tufan	Biresh Chatterjee		
1990	Agnikanya	Gopal Gupta		
1990	Garmil	Dilip Roy		
1990	Manasi	Amal Ray Ghatak		
1991	Sadharan Meye	Shamit Bhanja		
1992	Dharma Yuddha	Shamit Bhanja	Special appearance	
1992	Pitrireen	Sukanta Ray		
1992	Padma Nadir Majhi	Goutam Ghose	Indo-Bangladesh joint production	
1992	Surer Bhubane	Prabir Mitra	Special appearance	
1993	Janani	Sanat Dasgupta		
1993	Prithibir Shesh Station	Lalit Mukherjee		
1994	Rajar Raja	Shamit Bhanja		
1995	Ujan	Amal Ray Ghatak		
1996	Yugant	Aparna Sen		
2000	Bariwali	Rituparno Ghosh		
2000	Bastir Meye Radha	Chiranjeet Chakraborty		
2000	Rupasi Dohai Tomar			
2001	Dekha	Goutam Ghose		
2001	Shesh Bichar			
2002	Anamni Angana	Dr Swapan Saha		
2002	Bangali Babu	Anjan Chowdhury		
2003	Abar Aranye	Goutom Ghosh		
2004	Mahulbanir Sereng	Sekhar Das		
2005	Abiswashi			
2005	Antarmahal	Rituparno Ghosh		
2005	Krantikaal	Sekhar Das		
2005	Mayer Raja			
2005	Nagordola	Raj Mukherjee		
2005	Shunyo E Buke	Kaushik Ganguly		
2005	Tarpor Bhalobasa	Anjan Dutt		
2007	Chirosakha He			
2007	Bidhatar Lekha	Raja Mukerji		
2007	Jara Bristite Bhijechhilo	Anjan Das		
2007	Ratbhor			
2008	Khela	Rituparno Ghosh	Special appearance	
2009	Chowrasta - Crossroads of Love	Anjan Dutt		
2009	Kaaler Rakhal	Sekhar Das		
2010	Rahmat Ali			
2011	Jaani Dyakha Hawbe	Birsa Dasgupta		
2012	Abosheshey	Aditi Roy		
2012	Dutta Vs Dutta	Anjan Dutt		
2012	Hemlock Society	Srijit Mukherjee		
2012	Mayabazaar			
2012	Na Hannyate	Ringo Banerjee		
2012	Nobel Chor	Suman Ghosh		
2013	Aashbo Arek din			
2013	Half Serious	Utsav Mukherjee		
2013	Namte Namte	Rana Basu		
2013	Shantiniketane			
2014	Bonku Babu	Anindya Bikash Dutta		
2014	Nayanchapar Dinratri	Sekhar Das		
2014	Piyalir Password	Raj Basu		
2014	Punascha	Shouvik Mitra		
2015	Natoker Moto - Like a Play	Debesh Chattopadhyay		
2015	Aro Ekbar	Ariziet Halder		
2015	Arshinagar	Aparna Sen		
2016	Onyo Opalaa	Satarupa Sanyal		
2017	Golmaal	Narayan Roy		
2025	Raghu Dakat	Dhruba Banerjee		
2026	Pratyabartan	Samarpan Sengupta		
TBA	Coffee Houser Sei Addata †			
TBA	Kaancher Dewal †	Anindya Sarkar		

=== Odia Film ===
Year	Title	Director	Notes	Ref.
1995	Rana Bhumi	Pranab Das		

=== Telugu films ===
Year	Title	Director	Notes	Ref.
1990	Sasirekha Sapadham			
1991	Naa Ille Naa Swargam	K. R. Reddy		
1992	Inspector Bhavani			

=== Kannada films ===
Year	Title	Director	Notes	Ref.
1991	Police Matthu Dada	Tulsi Ramsay; Shyam Ramsay		
1991	Kadana	K V Raju		
1991	CBI Vijay	V. Uma Shankar		
1993	Bahaddur Hennu	A. V. Sheshagiri Rao		

=== Malayalam film ===
Year	Title	Director	Notes	Ref.
1993	Agnishalabhangal			

=== Assamese film ===
Year	Title	Director	Notes	Ref.
1992	Ranangini	Chandra Mudoi		

== Telefilms ==
Year	Title	Director	Notes	Ref.
1986	Nirupama	Bijoy Chatterjee	Telefilm based on Rabindranath Tagore's Bengali short story Dena Paona	
1986	Stree Ki Patra	Soumitra Chatterjee	Telefilm based on Rabindranath Tagore's Bengali short story Streer Patra	
1986	Manjulika			
2001	Obhinoy	Rituparno Ghosh		
2002	Ushnotar Jonyo	Kaushik Ganguly		
	Abhinetri			
	Dui Bon			

== TV series ==
=== Hindi TV series ===
Year	Title	Role	Director	Notes	Ref.
1988	Ganadevta	Durga	P. Kumar Vasudev		
1989-90	Mahabharat	Draupadi	Ravi Chopra		
1993	Krishnakant Ka Vasiyatnama	Rohini	Shyamanand Jalan		
1995	Kanoon	Mrs. Mathur	BR Chopra		
1995	Chandrakanta	Damini	Nirja Guleri		
1995	Parampara				
1995	Parivartan		Bharat Rungachary		
1995	Virasat		Rakesh Chowdhary		
1997	Mahabharat Katha	Draupadi	Ravi Chopra		
1999	Tarkash	Geeta			
2000-01	Jai Ganesha	Parvati			
2004	Sahib Biwi Gulam		Rituparno Ghosh		
2006	Krishnakali		Amol Palekar		
2007	Karam Apnaa Apnaa				
2007	Love Story				
2008	Waqt Batayega Kaun Apna Kaun Paraya				
2009	Heroine				
2009	Kasturi				
2009	Sacch Ka Saamna	Guest			
2009	Agle Janam Mohe Bitiya Hi Kijo	Sumitra Singh			
2011	Kis Desh Mein Hai Meraa Dil				
2011	Kahani Chandrakanta Ki				
2014	Khamosh Sa Afsana	Vaani's mother			
2014	Yeh Dil Sun Raha Hai		Ramesh Pandey		
2015	Kuch Toh Hai Tere Mere Darmiyaan				
2016	Badho Bahu	Payal	Sumit Sodani		
2017	Class of 2017		Suyash Vadhavkar		

=== Bengali TV series ===
Year	Title	Role	Director	Notes	Ref.
1986	Muktabandha		Ramaprasad Banik		
	Parashuramer Galpo		Ashok Mukherjee		
1988	Gora	Sucharita	Mrinmoy Chakraborty		
1988	Jiban Jerakam				
1988	Jodi Emon Hoto		Basu Chatterjee		
1989	Bharat Premkatha		Svaha		
1989	Paliye		Gyanesh Mukherjee		
1992	Muktabandha 2		Ramaprasad Banik		
1993	Shubhoratri	Ratri Roy			
	Jatak Kanya		Amal Sur		
	Ogo Priyotama				
1997	Janmabhoomi	Piyaribai	Inder Sen		
1999	Draupadi	Draupadi	Abhijit Dasgupta		
	Jhora Samayer Upokatha				
	Chena Mukher Sari				
	Sonar Bangla	Rani Bhabani	Inder Sen		
	Pratibimba	Kaberi Singh			
	Ingeet				
	Srot				
	Tithir Atithi				
	Kari Diye Kinlam				
2011	Kanakanjali		Arindam Ganguly		
2023	Meyebela	Bithika Mitra		Later Replaced by Anushree Das	

== Music video ==
Year	Title	Note	Ref.
2017	Dekha Hobe Ei Banglay		

== Music albums ==
Year	Album	Label	Notes	Ref.
1989	Mahabharat			
	Aamare Bhulona Priyo	Megaphone Calcutta		
	Anek diyechho Nath	Bhavna Records		
	Ektuku Chhonya Lage	Bhavna Records		
	Hridoy Majhe	Bhavna Records		
	Natun Kore Pabo Bole	Bhavna Records		
2011	Abosheshey			

== Radio programme ==
Year	Title	Radio station	Notes	Ref.
2009	Hello Roopa Bolchi	Friends FM		
