= List of awards and nominations received by Roopa Ganguly =

List of awards and nominations received by Indian actress and singer Roopa Ganguly

Roopa Ganguly awards and nominations
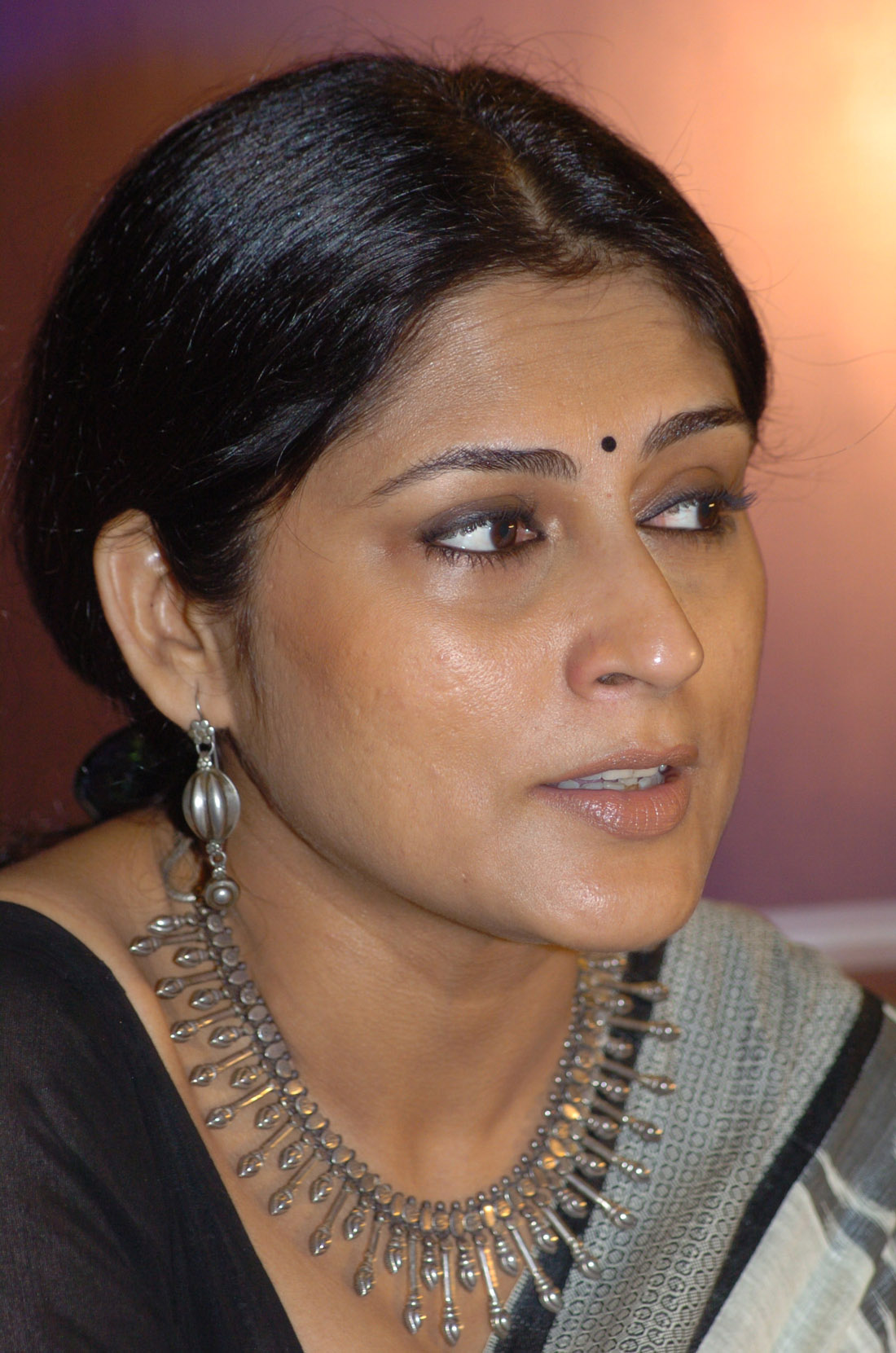
- Ganguly at the 36th IFFI, 2005
Awards and nominations
Award	Wins	Nominations
National Film Awards	1	—
Indian Television Academy Awards	2	—
BFJA Awards	2	—
Osian's Cinefan Festival Awards	1	—
Dhaka International Film Festival Awards	1	—
Smita Patil Memorial Award	1	—
Indian Telly Awards	1	2
Anandalok Puraskar	—	1

Roopa Ganguly is an Indian actress, playback singer, and politician known for her work in Hindi and Bengali cinema and television. She has received numerous accolades for her contributions to Indian entertainment, including the National Film Award for Best Female Playback Singer for Abosheshey (2011). She gained widespread recognition for portraying Draupadi in Mahabharat, a role that made her one of Indian television’s most iconic figures.

== National Film Awards ==
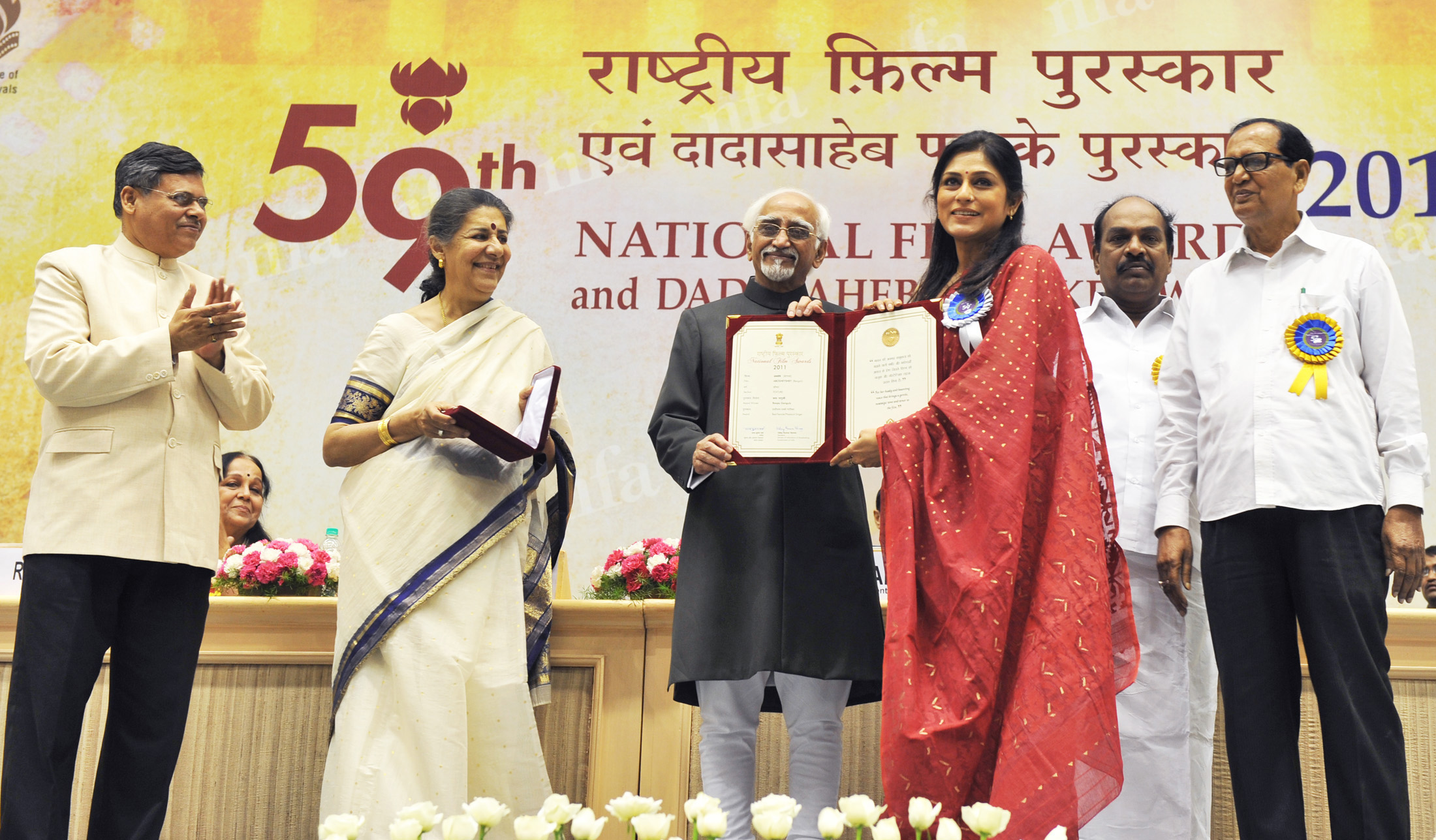
Ganguly receiving National Film Award for Best Female Playback Singer for rendering her voice in Aditi Roy's Bengali film Abosheshey (2012) (Note: The National Film Awards are awarded by the Government of India's Directorate of Film Festivals division for achievements in the Indian film industry.)

Year	Category	Film	Result	Ref.
2011	Best Female Playback Singer	Abosheshey	Won	

== Bengal Film Journalists' Association Awards ==
Year	Category	Film	Result	Ref.
1996	Best Supporting Actress	Ujan	Won	
2006	Best Supporting Actress	Antarmahal	Won	

== Osian's Cinefan Festival Award ==
Year	Nominated work	Category	Result	Ref.
2005	Antarmahal	Special Jury Mention	Won	

== Dhaka International Film Festival Award ==
Year	Category	Film	Result	Ref.
2006	Best Actress	Krantikaal	Won	

== Smita Patil Memorial Award ==
Year	Category	Show	Character	Result	Ref.
1979	Smita Patil Memorial Award for Best Actress	—N/a	—N/a	Won	

== Indian Television Academy Awards ==
Year	Category	Show	Character	Result
2002	Outstanding contribution in Indian Television	—N/a	—N/a	Won
2005	Lifetime Achievement Award	—N/a	—N/a	Won

== Indian Telly Awards ==
Year	Category	Show	Character	Result	Ref.
2005	Best Actress of the Decade	—N/a	—N/a	Won	
2009	Best Supporting Actress	Agle Janam Mohe Bitiya Hi Kijo	Sumitra Singh	Nominated	
2010	Best Supporting Actress	Agle Janam Mohe Bitiya Hi Kijo	Sumitra Singh	Nominated	

== Other awards ==
Award	Year	Category	Film	TV series	Result	Ref.
Anandalok Puraskar	2005	Best Actress	Nagordola		Nominated	
Kalakar Awards	1993	Best Actress		Mukta Bandha	Won	
Kalakar Awards	1998	Best Actress	Yugant		Won	
Kalakar Awards	2002	Best Actress		Ingeet	Won	
Aajkaal Television Purashkar	1990	Special Felicitation		Mahabharat	Won	
Uptron Award	1990	Best actress		Mahabharat	Nominated	
Filmfare Glamour & Style Awards West Bengal	2025	The ultimate diva timeless beauty			Won	
