= Gurcharan Singh =

Gurcharan Singh may refer to:

- Gurcharan Singh (boxer), Indian boxer and Olympian
- Gurcharan Singh (cricketer), Indian cricket coach and former cricketer
- Gurcharan Singh (painter), Indian figurative painter
- Gurcharan Singh Grewal, Indian field hockey player
- Gurcharan Singh Sekhon, Singaporean military officer
- Gurcharan Singh Tohra, Sikh politician
- Gurcharan Singh Bedi, Former Indian Air Force Air Marshal
- Gurcharan Singh (admiral), Indian Navy Rear Admiral

== See also ==
- Sardar Gurcharan Singh, Indian potter
