= Golmaal (2017 film) =

- Poster
- Directed by: Narayan Roy
- Written by: Tapan Pal; Narayan Roy
- Starring: Mithun Chakraborty; Roopa Ganguly; Victor Banerjee; Bhola Tamang
- Music by: Bidyut Goswami
- Release date: 24 March 2017
- Running time: 135 minutes
- Language: Bengali

Golmaal (formerly Buddhuram Dhol Duniya Gol) is a Bengali-language action comedy film directed by Narayan Roy starring Mithun Chakraborty along with Roopa Ganguly and Victor Banerjee.

== Plot ==
A policeman named Buddhuram Dhol who is expected to solve all the cases that come his way. Roopa Ganguly plays his love interest who later marries Kunal Padhi. She plays the role of Katha's mother who runs away from home.

== Cast ==
- Mithun Chakraborty – Buddhuram Dhol
- Ashfaq Abidi - CBI Officer Vikram
- Roopa Ganguly
- Victor Banerjee
- Bhola Tamang
- Kunal Padhi
- Prity Biswas
