= The Wife (2021 film) =

2021 Indian Hindi-language horror film

- Release poster
- Directed by: Sarmad Khan
- Written by: Sarmad Khan; Manoj Kalwani (dialogues)
- Starring: Gurmeet Choudhary; Sayani Datta
- Cinematography: Kedar Phadke
- Music by: Utkarsh Umesh Dhotekar
- Distributed by: Zee5
- Release date: 19 March 2021
- Country: India
- Language: Hindi

The Wife is a 2021 Indian Hindi-language horror film directed by Sarmad Khan and starring Gurmeet Choudhary (in his lead debut) and Sayani Datta. The film was released on Zee5 in March 2021.

== Plot ==
The story follows Varun and his wife Arya buying a flat in city. They start to hear voices in the flat and seeing things. The rest of the story shows whether they solve the source of the haunting.

== Cast ==
- Gurmeet Choudhary as Varun
- Sayani Datta as Arya
- Shweta Dadhich as Dr. Raima Das
- Shubham Daulani as Young Varun
- Ashesh Jain as Varun's Father
- Pooja Jawhare as Anjana
- Divyansha Kaushik as Katrina Murad
- Vishal Kumar as Young Vikram Desai
- Satyendra Malik as Ganesh Shetty
- Rajeev Pandey as Vikram Desai
- Aanchal Singh as Sarika
- Siddhartha Srivastava as Police Inspector
- Chandrakant Taneja as Eshwar Reddy
- Jinu Thomas as Aram Nagar Director

== Reception ==
A critic from The Times of India wrote that "All said, ‘The Wife’ remains true to its genre but the pace of the film seems exhausting because it takes too much time for the big reveal. Though for a horror and suspense film, it manages to give you only a few spooks". A critic from Zee5 wrote that "Overall, the film makes for an engaging watch with a lot more to offer in terms of horror than just jump-scares". A critic from Zoom wrote that "All in all, The Wife isn't the horror film you could look forward to having spine-chilling moments".
