= Janani (1993 film) =

- Roopa Ganguly in a still from the film
- Directed by: Sanat Dasgupta
- Screenplay by: Partha Banerjee; Ashutosh Sarkar; Sanat Dasgupta
- Story by: Mahasweta Devi
- Produced by: Sanat Dasgupta
- Starring: Roopa Ganguly; Debesh Roy Chowdhury; Shuvojit Dasgupta; Gyanesh Mukherjee
- Edited by: Prosanto Dey
- Music by: Partha Sengupta
- Release date: 1993
- Running time: 130 minutes
- Country: India
- Language: Bengali

Janani (Note: Pronounced as 'Jononee'.) (lit. 'Mother') is a 1993 Bengali film directed and produced by Sanat Dasgupta (Note: Sanat Dasgupta is an Indian director and producer who has received three National Awards.) with a financial assistance from National Film Development Corporation of India. The film narrates the life of a little boy and his ostracized mother who is isolated from him as she is believed to be a witch in the village she lives in. It is based on a Bengali short story named Bayen (Bengali: বাঁয়েন) (Note: transl. A witch who breastfeeds a dead infant.) written by the renowned Bengali author Mahasweta Devi. It was scripted by Partha Banerjee, Ashutosh Sarkar and Sanat Dasgupta himself. The music of the film was scored by Partha Sengupta. It stars Roopa Ganguly in the central role.

The film won the National Film Award for Best Film on Other Social Issues in 1993 for its delicate portrayal of an obscurantist practice like witchcraft, prevalent in certain parts of the country. The film was internationally screened under the title Mother. For its social issues, the film attracted attention at several international film festivals. It was nominated for the Crystal Globe Award but lost to Mariano Barroso's film My Soul Brother (1994). It won the Prize of the Ecumenical Jury - Special Mention at the Karlovy Vary International Film Festival, 1994. It was also screened in the category "Cinema of Today : Reflections of Our Time" at the Montreal World Film Festival, 1994. It was also screened at several other international film festivals including Cairo International Film Festival, 1994 and Dhaka International Film Festival, 1994 as closing film. The film was not theatrically released in India.

== Plot ==
Malindar and his wife Chandi work as village domas. Chandi intends to quit her job as she is overpowered with consternation each time she is appointed to bury the corpse of an infant. She repulses at the thought that scavengers would dig the burial and feed on the corpse of the infant. She is affectionate towards her son Bhagirath and an infant nephew of Bhagirath. When the nephew died of pox, Chandi is accused of having done witchcraft to the infant. Anyway, both Malindar and Chandi refuse to accept such blame. Once Chandi is spotted hovering at the burial of an infant, with a sickle in her hand. The villagers claim that she is a witch who breastfeeds corpses of infants. When Malindar is summoned, he too falls under the conviction of the villagers that Chandi is a witch who is supposed to be ostracised at this point. Even after she is expelled, she craves for her son Bhagirath's company. Despite his empathy for her, Malindar keeps Bhagirath away from her.

Once Chandi comes across several perpetrators who attempt to rob an oncoming train by accumulating bamboos on the track. They evade at the sight of Chandi. A helpless Chandi runs along the track to stop the train. The train stops hitting Chandi to her death. Next day, the local officer-in-charge and the BDO come to Malindar's place to confer the honorary medal in Chandi's name. A weeping Bhagirath now steps forward and asserts himself to be Chandi's son.

== Cast ==
- Roopa Ganguly as Chandi
- Debesh Roy Chowdhury as Malindar, Chandi's husband
- Suvojit Dasgupta (Note: Son of Sanat Dasgupta) as Bhagirath, Chandi's son
- Gyanesh Mukherjee
- Nemai Ghosh
- Ramen Roy Chowdhury
- Rajat Sen Gupta
- Simanta Chatterjee

== Awards and nominations ==
Year	Award	Category	Result	Ref.
1993	National Film Award	Best Film on Other Social Issues	Won	
1994	Prize of the Ecumenical Jury at Karlovy Vary International Film Festival	Special Mention	Won	
1994	Crystal Globe	Best Feature Film	Nominated	
