= Sayani Datta =

Bengali film actress

- Born: Kolkata, West Bengal, India
- Occupations: Actor and model
- Years active: 2012–present
- Parent(s): Subhas Datta (father); Swati Datta (mother)

Sayani Datta is an Indian actress and model who works in Bengali cinema. She started her career with the film Na Hannyate in 2012. Her second film, Shada Kalo Abcha, entered the international film festival circuit. In 2016, she acted in a short film called Feet and Foe directed by Soumodeep Ghosh Chowdhury. She was also the celebrity model for the first edition of the FFACE calendar 2014. Datta made her Hindi cinema debut with Gurmeet Choudhary in The Wife (2021).

Sayani has appeared in national advertisements for Bournvita and Coloroso Sarees and other brands.

== Filmography ==
List of films of Sayani Datta

Year	Movie	Director	Notes
2012	Na Hannyate	Riingo Banerjee	Released on 16 November 2012
2013	Shada Kalo Abcha	Riingo Banerjee	Released on 22 November 2013
2014	Jijibisha	Sumit Kumar Das	Released on 12 September 2014
2014	Ek Je Ache Sohor	Riingo Banerjee	Released on 2015
2016	Chorabaali	Subhrajit Mitra	Released on 22 January 2016
2016	Romantic Noy	Rajib Chowdhury	Released on 18 November 2016
2017	Michael	Satrajit Sen	Released in November 2017
2017	Kaya	Rajib Chowdhury	Released in December 2017
2019	Jadu Kadai	Meghdut Rudra	
2021	The Wife	Sarmad Khan	Hindi debut, ZEE5 originals film

== Web series ==
Year	Title	Role	Platform	Notes
2019	Bombers		ZEE5	
