= Ahmed Muztaba Zamal =

Bangladeshi film critic

Ahmed Muztaba Zamal is a Bangladeshi film critic. He is the editor of Celluloid, a quarterly film magazine, and is the director of the Dhaka International Film Festival.

== Biography ==
Zamal first attended a film festival, the Munich Film Festival, in 1991. The following year he started the Dhaka International Film Festival.

Major film festivals, in addition to the juries selected by the festival to award its prizes, often feature independent juries that follow their own criteria to award their own prizes. Zamal was a member of the International Federation of Film Critics (FIPRESCI) independent jury at the Berlin International Film Festival in 1998 and 2018, at the Cannes Film Festival in 2002, 2005 and 2009, and at the Venice Film Festival in 2007.

Zamal has directed several documentaries, starting with Truth and Beyond (2006), which explores Islam in Bangladesh. Later that year he made Smritir Minar (A Monument of Memories), which records Bangladeshi participation in the 2006 Vijay Diwas (Victory Day) ceremonies of the Eastern Command of the Indian Army in Kolkata. The event commemorates the end of the Indo-Pakistani War of 1971 and the Bangladesh Liberation War. His 2011 Pahela Baishakh shows the Bengali New Year festivities.
