= Bahaar Aane Tak =

- Directed by: Tariq Shah
- Written by: Talat Rekhi
- Produced by: Gulshan Kumar
- Starring: Roopa Ganguly; Moon Moon Sen; Sumeet Saigal; Tariq Shah
- Cinematography: Ajay Prabhakar
- Edited by: Vinod Nayak; Prashant Khedekar
- Music by: Rajesh Roshan
- Release date: 7 December 1990
- Country: India
- Language: Hindi

Bahaar Aane Tak is a 1990 Indian Hindi-language drama movie directed by Tariq Shah and produced by Gulshan Kumar. The cinematographer of this film is Ajay Prabhakar. The film revolves around a man who coincidentally marries a woman who was once raped by his close friend. It stars Roopa Ganguly, Moon Moon Sen, Sumeet Saigal, Tariq Shah, Shammi, Ram Mohan and Navin Nischol. The music of the film was composed by Rajesh Roshan.

== Plot ==
Vijay and Raja have been best friends since childhood. Vijay is obedient, honest and hardworking and lives with his mother. He is always haunted by the death of his girlfriend Renu, who died in an accident. Raja is the son of wealthy businessman Mahendra Pratap, who hates his son because his wife died during childbirth. He blames Raja for her death and prefers to not have any relationship with his son. As a result, the task of raising Raja falls on the shoulders of their loyal servant Bansi, who gives Raja the love of a mother and a father.

Despite Bansi's good upbringing, Vijay's mum's love and Vijay's guidance, Raja still grows up to be a philandering playboy who lives a hedonistic lifestyle. Being a loyal friend, Vijay always has to bail his friend out of trouble and he even berates him and urges him to change his womanizing ways, but Raja is incorrigible.

One day, Vijay's mother meets a kind girl called Rama in the temple and decides to get her married to her son. Vijay reluctantly agrees, without even knowing who the girl is. Because of some important business matter, Raja has to travel to London and so is unable to attend the wedding. On the wedding night, Vijay sees his bride's face for the first time and is quite shocked, as it turns out that Rama is the same girl whom Raja had once raped and Vijay hadn't been able to save her. It immediately became obvious to Vijay that Rama had married him only to exact her revenge as she believed that Vijay was in cahoots with Raja when the latter raped her.

When Raja returns from London, he too is shocked to see Rama, but neither Raja nor Vijay can reveal anything to Vijay's mother. The two continue to live their lives while every moment being tormented by what they did to Rama. This inner guilt creates a rift between the two friends and even pushes Vijay into becoming an alcoholic. When Rama learns of Vijay's innocence, she has a change of heart and she and Vijay reconcile. Rama also says that she has chosen to let go of her hate and has forgiven Raja.

Raja however, unaware of this and tormented by his guilt decides to commit suicide by drinking poison. Vijay and Rama rush to Raja's side, but they are too late. Raja eventually dies in his friend's arms.

== Cast ==
- Roopa Ganguly as Rama
- Sumeet Saigal as Rajkumar Pratap "Raja"
- Moon Moon Sen as Renu
- Tariq Shah as Vijay
- Ram Mohan as Bansi
- Navin Nischol as Mahendra Pratap
- Shammi as Vijay's mother

== Soundtrack ==
Lyrics were written by Indivar.

	Song	Singer
1	"Mohabbat Inayat Karam Dekhte Hain"	Anuradha Paudwal, Pankaj Udhas
2	"Kali Teri Choti Hai Paranda"	Anuradha Paudwal, Mangal Singh
3	"Ek Pal Hasna Jo Chaha"	Anwar
4	"Dil Ke Karib Koi Chhupa Hai"	Talat Aziz, Anuradha Paudwal
5	"Ye Khamoshi Mere Hum Nashi"	Anuradha Paudwal, Kumar Sanu
6	"Aankhen Aankhen Maikhaana Dil Peene Ko"	Pankaj Udhas, Anuradha Paudwal
7	"Nazar Milata Kabhi Tujhse"	Anuradha Paudwal, Gurcharan
8	"Din Patjhad Ke Ya Bahaare Ho"	Anuradha Paudwal, Manhar Udhas
