= Subhas Datta =

Indian environmental activist

Subhas Dutta সুভাষ দত্ত
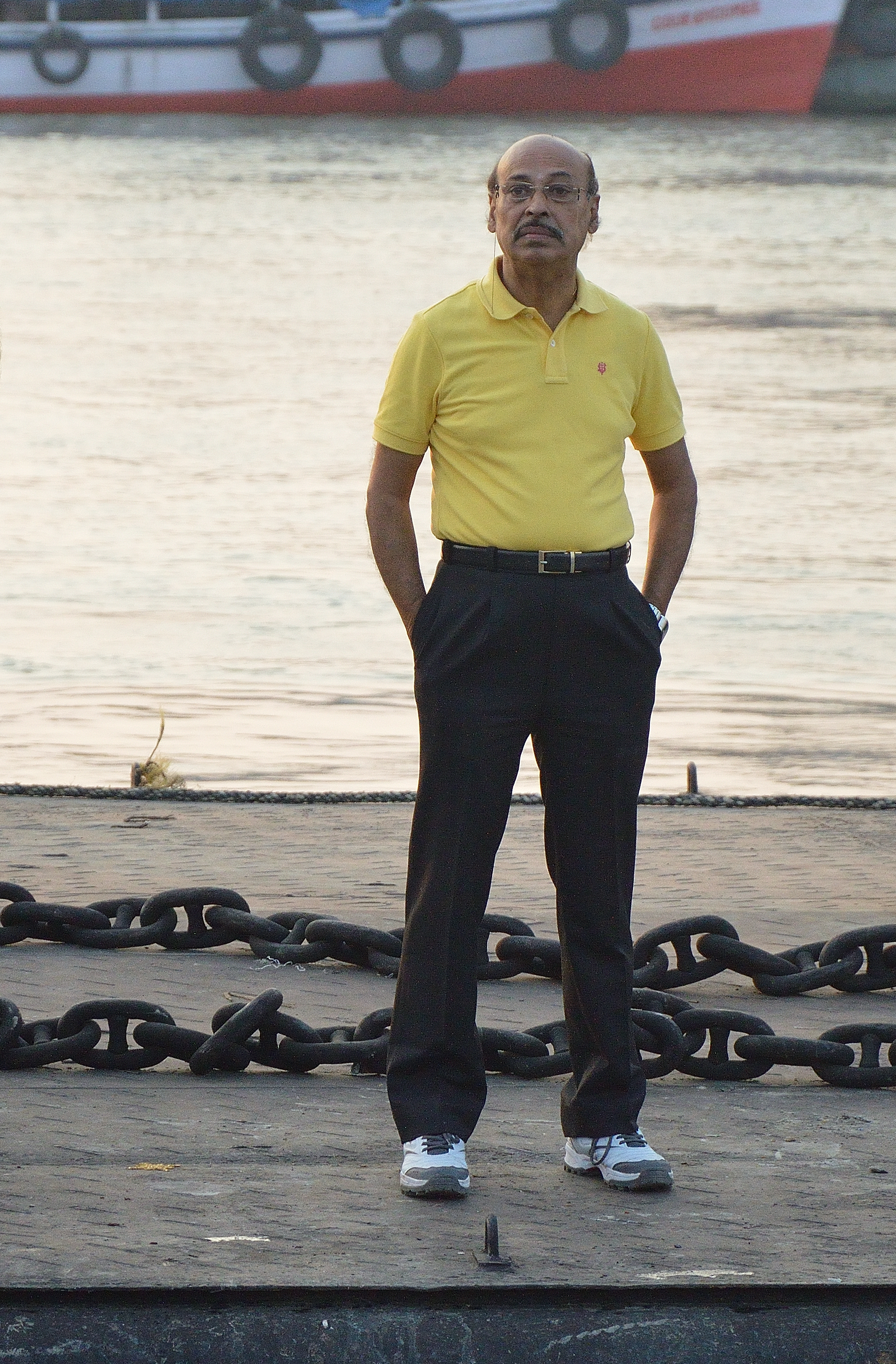
- Datta at the Baja Kadamtala Ghat, Kolkata, in October 2012.
- Born: 21 November 1949 (age 76); Howrah
- Occupations: Green Activist and Chartered Accountant
- Spouse: Swati Datta
- Children: Sayani Datta and Sumanta Datta

Subhas Datta is an environmental activist who has been so for over three decades. He is a qualified chartered accountant by profession. Since 1995, Datta has aired the grievances of the masses before the judicial forum by filing a Public Interest Litigation (PIL).

== Biography ==
Subhas Datta's work in environmental activism began in 1977, when the tree plantation programme was initiated. In 2004, based on his petition before the Green Bench of the High Court at Calcutta, the Act in the name and style of West Bengal Trees (Protection and Conservation in Non-Forest Areas) Act, 2006 was passed. The act's purpose was to save trees in the non-forest areas of the State.

In 1995, a Public Interest Litigation (PIL) was filed before the Supreme Court of India regarding Howrah city’s environmental issues and based on this petition, the first Green Bench of the country in any High Court was set up in the Calcutta High Court. From 1995 to date, Datta has been ventilating the grievances of the masses before the judicial forum through filing Public Interest Litigations (PIL). On PIL matters, Datta gets the information first, collects the related documents on the subject, verifies the information, visits the locations, takes photographs, drafts the petition, files the PIL and makes the submissions before the Court. Datta has so far moved the highest number of PILs in the country filed before the Supreme Court of India and the High Court at Calcutta.

== Recognition and Notable Work ==
Datta was recognized and awarded as a Kolkata Hero by the Times of India Group in 2013.

He has won many legal battles for preserving the environment, such as the Botanical Gardens Issue, Conservation of the Brigade Parade Ground and forming the country's first Environment Bench, popularly known as the Green Bench, among many others.

== Important Achievements ==
- Times of India Group featured him as the top Hero of the country in 2007.
- “India Today” had covered the activities of Subhas Datta as one of the fifty pioneers of the country in its 7 July 2008 edition.
- “Hindustan Times” has given the honour to Subhas Datta as one of the 25 Change Makers of the country.
- Times of India had nominated Subhas Datta as one of the Heroes of Calcutta- 2013,
- The Telegraph and National Insurance Co Ltd gave Subhas Datta the True Legends Award in 2018.
- Subhas Datta was invited by the European Green Party leaders in Brussels and London to discuss the formation of the Green Party in India.
- German Scholar Dr. Hans Dembowski had made research work on environmental litigations in India which has extensively covered Subhas Datta activities and the thesis paper was subsequently published by the Oxford University Press titled as “Taking the State to court”.

== Current Environmental Issues Raised ==
Pollution

- Air pollution arising out of auto emissions in Calcutta;
- West Bengal chapter of the Ganges pollution;
- Water contamination in W.B.;
- Mismanagement of Calcutta’s traffic system;
- Failure of the drainage and sewage system of Calcutta city;
- Carrying night-soil on human heads;
- Victoria Memorial Hall conservation and management;
- Disorders in Botanical Garden at Howrah;
- Theft of the Nobel Prize Medal and conservation of objects in the Museums.
- Pollution being caused by unchecked movement of lorries during night hours, etc.
- Failure of the drainage and sewerage system in Howrah city.
- Shifting of the Esplanade Bus Terminus from Calcutta Maidan.
- Use of eco-friendly bio-diesel for automobiles.
- Use of renewable energy in place of conventional power to address.
- Conservation of Biodiversity in Protected Areas like Rabindra Sarobar and the lake inside it.
- Hotels and resorts at BTR

Global Warming

- Rallies and public meetings held on the roads of Calcutta City
- Unreasonable price hike of coal by Coal India Ltd.
