= P. Kumar Vasudev =

- P. Kumar Vasudev
- Born: 21 June 1936
- Died: 31 October 1998 (aged 62)
- Education: FTII
- Occupation: Director

P. Kumar Vasudev (21 June 1936 – 31 October 1998) was an Indian director who is known for his work in Indian television. His Hum Log, (1984–85) broadcast on DD1 was India's first soap opera and the first serial drama series in the Indian sub-continent and Asia.

== Career ==
Vasudev's big screen venture Kunwari Bahu (1984) is an adaptation of Repati Koduku, a Telugu novel authored by Malladi Venkata Krishna Murthy. Hum Log, (1984–85) broadcast on DD1 was India's first soap opera and the first drama series in the Indian sub-continent and Asia. His directorial venture Ganadevta (1987–88) is a televised version of Tarashankar Bandyopadhyay's 1942 Bengali novel Ganadevata. It starred Rohit Orhi in lead. It also featured Roopa Ganguly and Anjul Chaturvedi. The series earned Ganguly her national recognition.

== Death ==
Kumar Vasudev died in Pune, India, on 31 October 1998, following a brief illness. He is survived by his wife and three daughters.

== Accolades ==
Year	Title	Category	Work	Result	Ref.
1989	Uptron Award	Best TV serial	Ganadevta	Nominated	

== Filmography ==
=== Films ===
Year	Title	Direction	Notes	Ref.
1978	Shalimar		Video sequence director; Released on 31 December 1978	
1984	Kunwari Bahu	Yes	Released on 10 July 1984	
	At Five Past Five	Yes		
	Guru	Yes	1st Indian telefilm	

=== TV series ===
Year span	Title	Broadcaster	Notes	Ref.
1984–85	Hum Log	Doordarshan	First episode: 7 July 1984; Last episode (156th) : 17 December 1985	
1986	Ajube	Doordarshan		
1988	Ganadevta	Doordarshan		
