= Roopa Ganguly =

Indian actress and politician (born 1963)

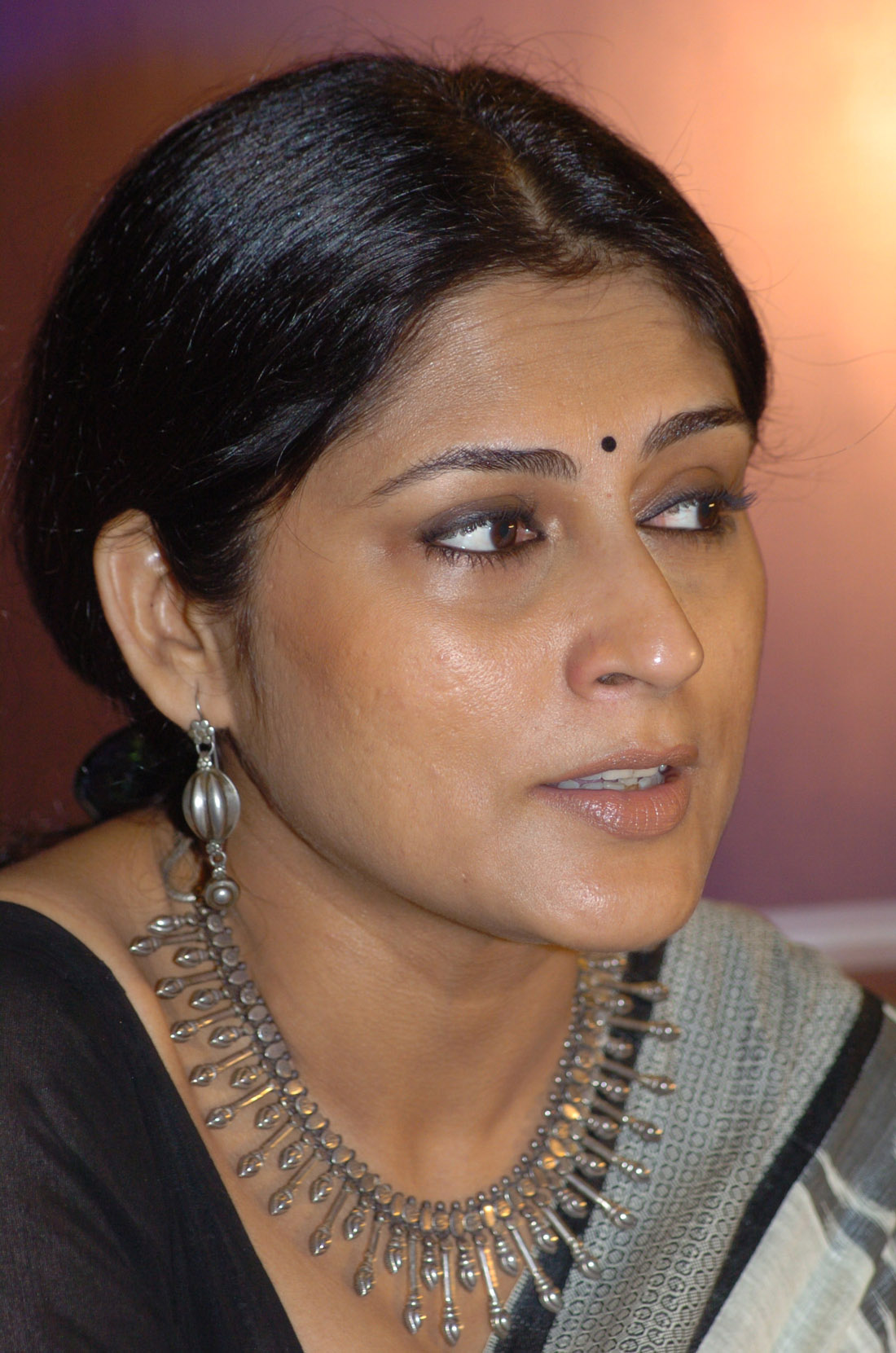
- Roopa Ganguly at a Press Conference at 36th International Film Festival of India in Panaji, Goa in 2005

Member of the West Bengal Legislative Assembly
- Incumbent
- Assumed office 9 May 2026
- Chief Minister: Suvendu Adhikari
- Preceded by: Arundhuti Maitra
- Constituency: Sonarpur Dakshin
- Majority: 35,782 (52.34%)

Member of Parliament, Rajya Sabha
- In office 4 October 2016 – 24 April 2022
- Nominated by: President Pranab Mukherjee
- Preceded by: Navjot Singh Sidhu
- Succeeded by: V. Vijayendra Prasad
- Constituency: Nominated (Arts)

President of BJP Mahila Morcha, West Bengal
- In office 30 December 2015 – 24 July 2017
- Preceded by: Jyotsna Banerjee
- Succeeded by: Locket Chatterjee

Personal details
- Born: 25 November 1966 (age 59) (Note: Ganguly bagan her acting career in 1986. She herself claimed that she had already completed her graduation before she began her acting career.) Calcutta, West Bengal, India
- Party: Bharatiya Janata Party (since 2015)
- Occupations: Politician; actress
- Years active: 1986–present
- Works: Full list
- Spouse: Dhrubo Mukherjee (m. 1992; div. 2007)
- Children: 1
- Awards: Full list

Roopa Ganguly (pronounced [ˈɾupa ˈɡaŋɡuli]; born 25 November 1966) is an Indian actress, politician, and playback singer. She was one of the highest-paid television actresses in India during 1980s. She is best known for her portrayal of Draupadi in B R Chopra's hit television series Mahabharat. Often promoted as the Tollywood's answer to Bollywood's Shabana Azmi, she is known for her versatility and accent adaptation. She has worked with directors such as Mrinal Sen, Aparna Sen, Goutam Ghose and Rituparno Ghosh. She is a trained Rabindra Sangeet vocalist and a classical dancer. She received several awards including a National Award and two BFJA Awards. In October 2016, she was nominated as a Member of Parliament, Rajya Sabha by the President of India. She served as the President of BJP Mahila Morcha in West Bengal. She served as the General Secretary and the Vice-president for the West Bengal Motion Picture Artistes' Forum, a body representing cine artistes. Her films have commulatively grossed more than US$100 million worldwide.

Her first acting assignment was Bijoy Chatterjee's Hindi telefilm Nirupama (1986) based on Rabindranath Tagore's Bengali short story Denapaona and broadcast on DD National. Her breakthrough role came with the Bengali TV series Muktabandha (1986) directed by Ramaprasad Banik. She achieved national recognition for her role in P. Kumar Vasudev's Hindi TV series Ganadevta (1987–88) and shot to wider fame and popularity after she played Draupadi in B. R. Chopra's Mahabharat (1988–90). She reprised the role of Draupadi in Chopra's Mahabharat Katha. She acted in popular Hindi TV series such as Kanoon (1993), Chandrakanta (1994), Karam Apnaa Apnaa (2007), Kasturi (2009), Agle Janam Mohe Bitiya Hi Kijo (2009). Popular Bengali TV series, she acted in, include Janmabhoomi (1997), Draupadi (1999), Ingeet (2001), Tithir Atithi to name a few.

She made her big screen debut opposite Chiranjeet in Prabhat Roy's Bengali film Prateek (1988). She achieved critical acclaims for her performance in National Award winning Indo-Bangladesh joint production film as Padma Nadir Majhi (1992) by Goutam Ghose, and National Award winning Bengali films such Janani (1993) by Sanat Dasgupta and Yugant (1995) by Aparna Sen. She received BFJA Award for Best Supporting Actress twice for her roles in Amal Ray Ghatak's Ujan (1995) and Rituparno Ghosh's Antarmahal (2005). In the same year, she acted in the role of a conceited actress in Anjan Dutt's Tarpor Bhalobasa, which once again earned her critical acclaim. She was conferred with Osian's Cinefan Festival Special Jury Mention for her role in Antarmahal (2005). She was awarded in the Best Actress in a Leading Role category for her role in Sekhar Das's National Award winning Bengali film Krantikaal (2005) at the 9th Dhaka International Film Festival. In January 2006, she was named by The Indian Express in the list of the five most powerful actresses of 2005. She was further acclaimed for her roles in films such as Kaaler Rakhal (2009), Chowrasta - The Crossroads of Love (2009), Chaurahen (2012), Na Hannyate (2012), Dutta Vs Dutta (2012) and Punascha (2014). In 2011, she received the National Film Award for Best Female Playback Singer for rendering her voice in Aditi Roy's Bengali film Abosheshey (2012).

== Early life ==
Ganguly was born to Samarendra Lal Ganguly and Juthika Ganguly on 25 November 1966. She grew up in a joint family. She was a student of Beltala Girls' High School from which she finished her secondary examination. She completed her Higher Secondary Education from Jodhpur Park Girls' High School. Later, she obtained a bachelor's degree from the Jogamaya Devi College, an affiliated undergraduate women's college of University of Calcutta, in Kolkata. Ganguly had to face severe financial crisis during her college days.

== Acting career ==
Ganguly's acting debut marked a benchmark though she never aspired to be an actress. After she completed her graduation, she was suggested by some of her relatives to pursue acting. She attended a wedding ceremony where she was approached by Bijoy Chatterjee (Note: Bijoy Chatterjee was her relative.) who was looking for a fresh face with unplucked eyebrows to play the titular role in his Hindi telefilm Nirupama (1986) based on Rabindranath Tagore's Bengali short story Denapaona. Ganguly was initially hesitant to accept his proposal but later gave her nod on her aunts' insistence. Chatterjee's thematic focus was on the societal subjugation of women. The theme of this story revolves around the dowry system, its devastating consequences, and the exploitation of women in a patriarchal society. The narrative accentuates the struggles of Ramsundar Mitra, a father who agrees to pay a hefty dowry for his daughter Nirupama's marriage to a wealthy family. Despite his efforts to fulfill his obligations, he faces humiliation, financial ruin, and emotional distress. Ganguly portrays Nirupama who is subjected to mistreatment and neglect by her in-laws, who view her as a source of financial gain, alongside Soumitra Chatterjee enacting the role of Ramsundar Mitra. The telefilm also explores the theme of sacrifice and selflessness, particularly in the characters of Ramsundar and Nirupama. Ramsundar's love for his daughter instigates him to sell his house or accumulate debt. Nirupama, on the other hand, prioritises her father's well-being over her own interests, refusing to accept the dowry money that would further exploit her family. The narrative highlights the tragic consequences of the dowry system, including the loss of dignity, autonomy, and even life. Nirupama's death serves as a poignant escape from the indignity she endures, underscoring the tragic consequences of a society that perpetuates such injustice.

Impressed with her potential, Soumitra Chatterjee cast her as Mrinal alongside his daughter Poulami Basu playing the role of Bindu in his directorial venture Stree Ki Patra (1986; transl. The Wife's Letter), based on Streer Patra a Bengali short story written by Tagore. The telefilm manifests the struggle for freedom and self-identity of a woman in a patriarchal society. Ganguly plays the protagonist who has to yield to the atrocious hostility from her in-laws when she intends to foster Bindu, a helpless girl portrayed by Chatterjee's daughter Poulami. The telefilm highlights the societal norms and expectations that restrict women's lives. The protagonist's own desires, aspirations, and individuality are suppressed, and she is forced to conform to the roles assigned to her. The story also explores the theme of female solidarity, as the protagonist fights for Bindu's rights and tries to protect her from abuse. It critiques the patriarchal society's treatment of women, particularly in the context of marriage and family. It portrays the ways in which women are objectified, commodified, and marginalised, and how they are forced to conform to societal norms that prioritise men's interests. The protagonist's decision to leave her husband's house and start a new life is a testament to her growing awareness of her own identity and her desire for autonomy. Ganguly was critically appreciated for her performance. She said that she was convincing as Mrinal as she could relate to the commodification and discrimination the character undergoes.

What Mrinal underwent may be a daily experience to some. I have always felt that women do not have the entitlement to the extent of what men have. Whenever a woman aspires to grab some position so long held by men, she is deemed to be adamant or boorish. Mrinal is deemed to be adamant when she opposes the idea of sending Bindu back to her lunatic husband. Every Indian woman feels commodification and social dissension in terms of gender equality. I have felt the same as well. Thus Mrinal was not an alien character to me. Rabindranath Tagore's Streer Patra is one of his most poignant and relatable compositions. It is not hard to relate to the injustice done to Bindu. Neither is it hard to understand that her death is a liberation from her suffering and indignity. She is a foil to Mrinal who is encouraged or galvanized by her death to retire from her marital obligation. When I was asked to portray Mrinal, I played a part in myself. The rest was moulded by Soumitra Chatterjee who gave the blow-by-blow explanation of how to face the camera.

— Ganguly on how she portrayed Mrinal convincingly, during an interview conducted by PTI

Her next foray was Manjulika (1986) directed by Bijoy Chatterjee. She plays the titular role of a teenage widow who is devastated to learn that her father intends to remarry after her mother's death. Like her previous telefilms, this also portrays the ways in which women are commodified, and marginalised, and how they are forced to conform to societal norms that prioritise men's interests. Based on Tagore's Bengali poem Nishkriti (transl. Deliverance), the plot revolves around Manjulika and her ailing mother whose plea to get Manjulika remarried to Pulin is disapproved by her father. She ultimately elopes with Pulin when her father himself remarries eleven months after her mother's death.

Ganguly was enjoined by Ramaprasad Banik to appear for a look test for the female lead in his Bengali TV series Muktabandha (1986). After she appeared for the look test, Samaresh Majumdar, the screenplay writer of the TV series considered her to be imperfect for the role. The role being that of a call girl, Majumdar wanted an attractive actress to portray it. He suggested Banik to find another actress other than Ganguly whom he considered to be dowdy. Majumdar was requested to meet Ganguly once again. This time Ganguly appeared charming and attractive, and was finalised to portray the female lead. Her performance in the series was appreciated.

Ganguly successfully auditioned for the role of Durga in P. Kumar Vasudev's Hindi TV series Ganadevta (1987–88). It was based on Tarasankar Bandyopadhyay's much acclaimed 1942 Bengali novel Ganadevata. Set against the backdrop of British Raj in the twentieth century, the series documents Dalit uprising against the exploitation of the rich upper caste in a rural India. She played Durga, a rural, subaltern prostitute who is of service to a group of Indian nationalists who intend to eradicate the subaltern plight. Durga embodies the spirit of a rebellious subaltern woman who dares to defy oppressive social norms. She challenges the stagnant, superstitious, and caste-ridden village life through her personal choices, which are seen as scandalous by the conservative community. Unlike the traditional, subservient women of her time, Durga refuses to accept her fate as a mere appendage to a patriarchal society. She is driven by her own desires and a fierce sense of self, which earns her the community's condemnation but makes her a symbol of change. Her relationship with Aniruddha, a blacksmith from a lower caste, is a direct challenge to the rigid social stratification of the village. By breaking the taboo of inter-caste relationships, Durga symbolizes the dismantling of the old caste-based structures that had long governed rural life. The role extensively propelled her career. A number of directors including Mrinal Sen was impressed with her performance.

She accepted a role opposite Chiranjeet Chakraborty in Prabhat Roy's Bengali film Prateek (1988). Roy's next venture was Agnitrishna (1989) that once again saw Chiranjeet Chakraborty essaying the male protagonist Abhijit suffering from pyrophobia. Roy cast Ganguly as the female lead opposite Chakraborty. She had to enact the role of the doctor who treats the protagonist. The film failed to win critical favour while Ganguly's performance was critically acclaimed. She also accepted another role opposite Chakraborty in Biresh Chatterjee's Bengali film Tufan (1989). The film was a major financial success. She featured in Mrinal Sen's much acclaimed Hindi Film Ek Din Achanak (1989) and Basu Chatterjee's Hindi film Kamla Ki Maut (1989).

Reportedly B.R. Chopra was quite impressed with Ganguly's performance in the TV series Gandevta. After Juhi Chawla declined the role of Draupadi for Mahabharat, Chopra decided to get her appear for a screen test for the role. In 1988, she was summoned by director Biresh Chatterjee to NT1 Studio where the director informed her that Chopra wanted her to appear for the look test. Ramya Krishnan was also another strong candidate to portray the role. Ganguly was finally chosen since her Hindi diction was better. In 1989, the 34th episode of the series introduced her. She was hailed for her performance in the Game of Dice sequence. The sequence was aired in the 46th, 47th and 48th episodes of the series. The sequence narrates Draupadi being dragged to the court by Dushasana. She then asks Bhishma, a veteran of the Kuru clan whether Yudhishthira has the right to put her in stake. The sequence demanded her to weep while enacting the part. She was so engrossed that she wept on even after her shot was over. She later claimed that her performance in the TV series was quite mediocre.

Ganguly received wide attention from Bollywood media and producers for her role in Chopra's Mahabharat, yet she never had a significant elevation in her Bollywood career. She said that things became very hard since she was an outsider and had to face the problem of casting couch. She featured as Rama in Tariq Shah's Hindi film Baahar Aane Tak (1990). The film did not meet financial success. Onwards, she appeared in films such as K. Bapayya's Pyar Ka Devta (1991), Raj Sippy's Saugandh (1991) and Rajkumar Kohli's Virodhi (1992) to name a few. In 1991, she acted in the blockbuster Kannada film Police Matthu Dada, directed by Tulsi Ramsay and Shyam Ramsay. In the same year, she appeared in its Hindi remake titled Inspector Dhanush. The film flopped at the box office. In 1992, she acted in A. V. Seshagiri Rao's Telugu film Inspector Bhavani, where she played the character of a sincere police officer whose object is to bring an end to those who assassinated her fiancée. In the same year, she acted in Sukanta Roy's Bengali film Pitrireen, where she played the character of Sathi, a photographer who inquires about her father's assassin.

In 1992, she appeared in Goutam Ghose's award-winning Bengali film Padma Nadir Majhi, where she played the character of Kapila, a woman from the fishermen community who falls for her sister's husband and finally leaves her family to settle with him on Moynadeep island. Her performance in this film was appreciated by the critics and media personalities. Utpal Dutt, who was also a part of this venture, was recorded to comment on her performance: "Roopa has really lived the life of Kapila with those flawless body languages of a woman from the fisherman community."

In 1995, She accepted a role in Ravi Chopra's Kanoon on the latter's insistence. In 1995, she appeared in Amal Roy Ghatak's Bengali film Ujan, which won her the BFJA Award for Best Supporting Actress in 1996. In 1996, she appeared in Aparna Sen's award-winning Bengali film Yugant, where she played the character of an obsessed dancer. Her performance in the film won favourable reviews.

Ganguly was once again cast as Draupadi in the Bengali TV series Draupadi (1999) directed and produced by Shishir Gupta. The screenplay was written by Dev Kumar Acharya while the background score was composed by Devjyoti Basu.

In 2000, she appeared in Rituparno Ghosh's award-winning Bengali film Bariwali, where she played the character of Sudeshna Mitra, an actress playing the character of Binodini, in a film Chokher Bali directed, alongside the male protagonist. In 2001, she appeared in a cameo role in Goutam Ghose's award-winning Bengali film Dekha. Though she made a cameo appearance in it, she garnered huge mass attention as the film was widely advertised on her enthralling dialogue; "Sagar dekhben naa, shudhu amake dekhun." In the film, she rendered her character with a fine, seductive approach, especially in the Eki Labonyo Purna Prate song sequence, where the character played by Soumitra Chatterjee recalls an earlier moment of Ganguly gazing back at him. In 2003, she appeared in Gautam Ghose's Bengali film Abar Aranye, where she played the character of Shimul, a buoyant woman who is grief-stricken at the deepest core of her heart for the probable loss of her husband. She appeared in a cameo role in Bow Barracks Forever (2004) by Anjan Dutt.

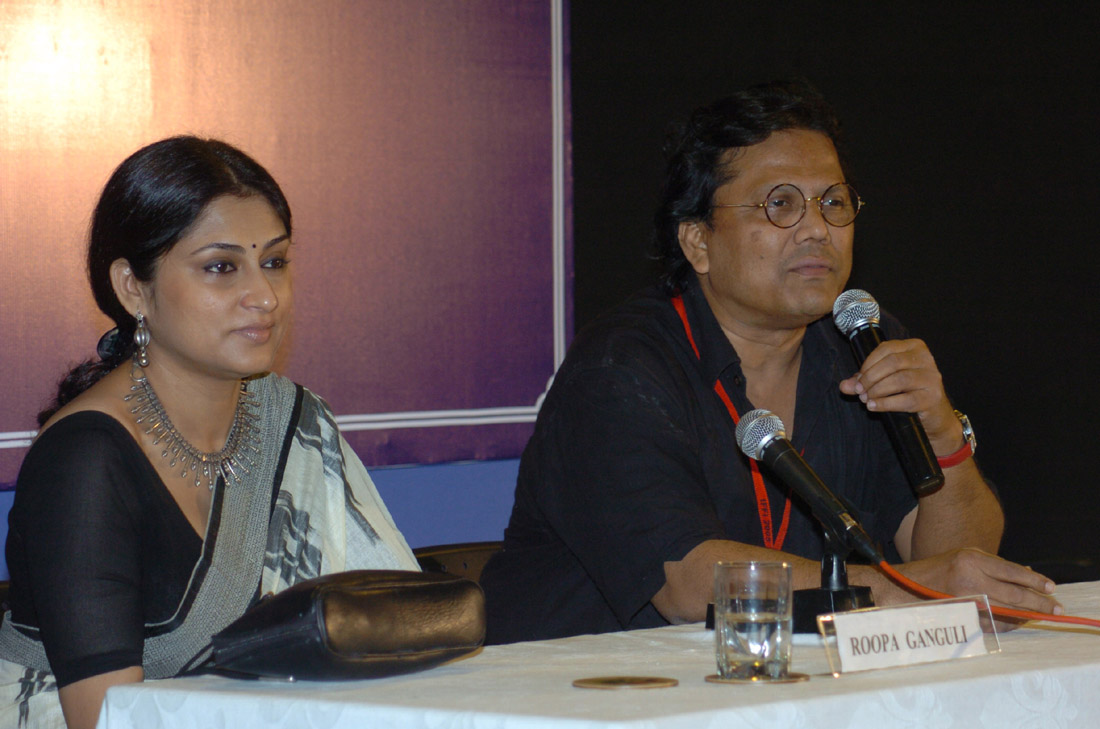
Ganguli at the Press Conference of Kratikaal at the 36th International Film Festival of India, 2005 in Panaji, Goa

In 2005, she appeared in Rituparno Ghosh's award-winning Bengali film Antarmahal, where she played the character of Mahamaya, a docile wife to an arrogant zamindar. Her performance in the film was hugely appreciated by film critics. Indian film critic Piyush Roy wrote on her performance in the film, "Ganguly rekindles memories of her fiery act of Draupadi in B R Chopra's Mahabharat through her blow hot, blow cold performance."

Roopa Ganguly's Mahamaya is a worthy contender to lead any listing of memorable women characters from Ghosh's abundant array of some seriously multi-dimensional female protagonists seen on celluloid in recent times. Ganguly rekindles memories of her fiery act of Draupadi in B R Chopra's Mahabharat through her blow hot, blow cold performance. The film's narrator may be the British artist, but hers is the character that drives its most dramatic moments and through whom the audience is warned about the catastrophe in waiting. From a jealous, wasted aging wife in the beginning, she seizes screen presence with her every appearance, lacing it with new untapped facets to her personality. To her husband's employees, she is like an incarnation of the goddess-provider, to Jashomati she is the nurturer and to the voyeuristic exploitative priests, she is the ultimate sexual tease. In the zamindar's "antarmahal" abounding with women resigned to their fates, she is a thinking, living, sexual being, who sets her own agendas and seeks her own pleasures, almost like a man.

— Piyush Roy (Indian film critic)

She herself considered this role as a big challenge as it was inherently contrary to her personality. The film won her the BFJA Award for Best Supporting Actress in 2006. Reportedly Mira Nair was all praise for Ganguly's performance in the film after the former had attended a private screening of the film in USA. Nair proposed her to play the role of Asima's mother in The Namesake. Ganguly eschewed the offer since the role was not meaty enough. She then, featured in Sekhar Das's award-winning Bengali film Krantikaal (2005), where she played the character of Subarna, who befriends a terrorist who broke into her house. She appeared in Raj Mukherjee's Bengali film Nagordola (2005), where she portrayed the character of an arrogant and rude woman who gets diagnosed as having throat cancer and realises that life is not like it has conventionally been and gives her full consent to her own unmarried daughter to give birth of her baby and to bring it up. The film was a major hit at the box office for its contemporary social issue. Her performance in the film earn her an Anandalok Award nomination in the Best Actress in the Leading Role category in 2006. She acted in the much acclaimed Bengali film Ek Mutho Chabi (2005), produced by herself, where she played the character of an established actress who has a car accident, consequently losing her career. In December 2005, Ganguly was named by The Telegraph in the list of Five Crowning Queens of 2005 alongside Rani Mukerji, Preity Zinta, Konkona Sen Sharma and Vidya Balan.

In 2006, she accepted a role of a writer in Karam Apnaa Apnaa produced by Balaji Telefilms and shifted her base to Mumbai. She then appeared in Hindi TV series such as Love Story and Agle Janam Mohe Bitiya Hi Kijo (2009).

Everything was fine. I don't mind if my role is not getting enough prominence as long as the character is meaty enough because that's how soaps are made today. I also don't mind if I am given less work. But I am a very sensitive and creative person. I felt that there was no respect for a senior actor like me. Money is everywhere but one doesn't work only for money. If there is no respect for the work one does then money is not worth the effort. On the last day of my shoot for Kasturi, I signed the register but didn't accept my pay-packet because I shot only for a few close-up shots. I didn't see any point in taking payment for only five minutes of work.

— Ganguly on quitting Ekta Kapoor's Kasturi

In 2009, she appeared in Sekhar Das's Bengali film Kaaler Rakhal. She appeared in Anjan Dutt's film Chowrasta the Crossroads of love (2009).

In 2011, she won the National Film Award for Best Female Playback Singer for rendering her voice in Aditi Roy's Bengali film Abosheshey (2012) where she also acted. In the film, she portrayed the character of Suchismita. She appeared in Birsa Dasgupta's Jaani Dyakha Hawbe (2011), which after much commercial expectation proved to be a failure at the box office.

She acted in Anurag Basu's blockbuster film Barfi! (2012). She acted in Anjan Dutt's Dutta Vs Dutta, (2012) where she played the character of "Runu mashi", who lives her life on her own terms and inspires the protagonist to live the life he desires. She featured in Joydeep Ghosh's Mayabazar (2012). The film has three individual stories. She played the protagonist in the story Smriti which is based on Dehantar by Sharadindu Bandopadhyay. She played Kuhu, a widow who sees her deceased husband in every single man she dates. She appeared in Riingo's Bengali film Na Hannyate (2012), where she played the character of Jui, who is caught in a situation where she could save only one of her kids and leave the other to die. In 2013, she appeared in Utsav Mukherjee's hilarious social-satirical film Half Serious. She played the role of goddess Durga in the film. She appeared in Rana Basu's Bengali film Namte Namte (2013). She also appeared in Shekhar Das's Bengali film Nayanchampar Dinratri (2013). In 2014, she appeared alongside Soumitra Chatterjee in Souvik Mitra's Bengali film Punascha, where she played the muse of an award-winning author, played by Chatterjee. The film earned her rave reviews including the statement made by The Times of India that the film belongs to her only. In 2015, she acted in Debesh Chottopadhyay's Bengali film Natoker Moto and Aparna Sen's Bengali film Arshinagar. She was offered the role of Jiji in Kushan Nandy's Babumoshai Bandookbaaz (2017), but was later replaced by Divya Dutta.

In 2023, Ganguly portrayed Bithika Mitra in Meyebela, a Bengali TV series produced by Surinder Films. It revolves around a joint family of Hazra Ln, South Kolkata. She abruptly left the series after a few months citing that the show contained "regressive content".

== Political career ==
In 2015, Ganguly joined Bharatiya Janata Party ahead of 2016 West Bengal Legislative Assembly election and quit Artiste Forum since she believed that a political figure should not hold a significant designation in Artiste Forum. On 30 December 2015, she was appointed the president of BJP Mahila Morcha, West Bengal, until 2017 when she was succeeded by Locket Chatterjee.

In West Bengal Assembly elections 2016, Ganguly lost from Howrah North to Trinamool Congress counterpart and cricketer Laxmi Ratan Shukla.

In May 2016, she was attacked allegedly by Trinamool Congress workers when she was returning from Kakdwip in South 24 Parganas where she had gone to meet victims of political violence. She sustained head injuries and had to be admitted to hospital.

She was nominated to the Rajya Sabha in October 2016 in place of cricketer Navjot Singh Sidhu, who resigned earlier. She completed her tenure as a member of the Rajya Sabha in 2022.

In 2026 legislative elections, She contested as a candidate of the Bharatiya Janata Party from Sonarpur Dakshin and won by a margin of 35000 votes.

== Personal life ==
Ganguly was married to Dhrubo Mukerjee, a mechanical engineer hailing from West Bengal, Kolkata from 1992 until 2007. They have one child, a son, born in 1997, Aakash Mukherjee. She was in a live-in relationship with the Bengali singer Dibyendu Mukherjee. They lived in Ganguly's flat in Mumbai until the end of their relationship. Ganguly maintained a pleasant formality whenever she met Mukherjee after their separation.

== Accolades and recognitions ==
=== Accolades ===
Ganguly has won numerous awards, including a National Award, Bengal Film Journalists' Association Awards two times and Kalakar Awards three times. In 2011, she was awarded the National Film Award for Best Female Playback Singer for rendering her voice in Aditi Roy's Bengali film Abosheshey. She was awarded for her husky and haunting voice in the songs Dure Kothay and Aji Bijan Ghare.

=== Recognition ===
- Social and cultural anthropologist Purnima Mankekar's ethnography of television-viewing in India, Screening Culture, Viewing Politics: An Ethnography of Television, Womanhood, and Nation in Postcolonial India, published by Duke University Press in 1999, features a still shot of Ganguly as Draupadi on its cover.
