= Gurcharan =

Gurcharan is an Indian given name. Notable people with the given name include:

- Gurcharan Das (born 1943), Indian author, commentator and public intellectual
- Gurcharan Das Mehta (1885–1975), Indian guru
- Gurcharan Kaur (born 1936), Indian politician
- Gurcharan Pohli (born 1942), Indian actor and singer
- Gurcharan Rampuri (1929–2018), Canadian poet
- Gurcharan Singh (disambiguation), multiple people
- Gurcharan Virk (c. 1968–2016), Punjabi writer, director, lyricist and producer
