= Hum Log (TV series) =

- Genre: Soap opera
- Written by: Manohar Shyam Joshi
- Directed by: P. Kumar Vasudev
- Starring: Vinod Nagpal; Jayshri Arora; Rajesh Puri; Abhinav Chaturvedi; Seema Bhargava; Divya Seth; Sushma Seth; Lahiri Singh; Loveleen Mishra
- Narrated by: Ashok Kumar
- Opening theme: "Hum Log" by Anil Biswas
- Country of origin: India
- Original language: Hindi
- No. of seasons: 1
- No. of episodes: 65

Production
- Camera setup: Multi-camera
- Running time: 25 minutes

Original release
- Network: DD National
- Release: 7 July 1984 – 17 December 1985

Hum Log (English: We People) is an Indian television soap opera and also the first serial drama series in Hindi. It began telecast on 7 July 1984 on Doordarshan, the only television channel in India at the time. It is the story of an Indian middle-class family of the 1980s and their daily struggles and aspirations. Hum Log is also the first Indian show to be sponsored.

It was created on the lines of a Mexican television series, Ven Conmigo (1975), using the education-entertainment methodology. The idea of the TV series came to then Information and Broadcasting Minister, Vasant Sathe, after a Mexican trip in 1982. Soon the idea for Hum Log was developed in collaboration with writer Manohar Shyam Joshi, who scripted the series, and filmmaker, P. Kumar Vasudev, who went on direct the series. The title score was composed by music director Anil Biswas.

At the end of every episode, Ashok Kumar discussed the ongoing story and situations with the audience using Hindi couplets and limericks. In later episodes, introduced the actors who played various characters in the serial and end his monologue with the various Indian language versions of the words "Hum Log".

The series was broadcast in the UK on the cable channel Indra Dhnush in 1992.

== Cast and characters ==
- Ashok Kumar as Narrator
- Vinod Nagpal as Basesar Ram: alcoholic father
- Jayshree Arora as Bhagwanti: the mother, a housewife
- Rajesh Puri as Lalit Prasad a.k.a. Lalloo: the eldest son, unemployed and looking for a job
- Abhinav Chaturvedi as Chander Prakash a.k.a. Nanhe: the younger son, aspiring to be a cricketer
- Seema Pahwa as Gunvanti a.k.a. Badki, a social worker
- Divya Seth as Rupvanti a. k. a. Majhli, aspiring to be an actress
- Loveleen Mishra as Preeti a.k.a. Chhutki, aspiring to be a doctor
- Lahiri Singh as Dadaji: retired military man and the grandfather
- Sushma Seth as Imarti Devi a.k.a. Dadi: the grandmother
- Renuka Israni as Usha Rani, Lalloo's wife
- Kamia Malhotra as Kamia Lal
- Aasif Sheikh as Prince Ajay Singh
- Manoj Pahwa as Tony: Guy who elopes with Majhli
- Suchitra (Srivastava) Chitale as Lajwanti ak.a. Lajo
- Kavita Nagpal as Santo Tai
- Ashwini Kumar (actor)|Ashwini Kumar as Dr. Ashwini Kumar
- Rajendra Ghuge as Inspector Sadanand Samdar
- Aparna Katara as Dr. Aparna
- S. M. Zaheer as Prof. Sudhir
- Vishwa Mohan Badola as Music teacher

== Development and production ==
In 1984, Mexican television writer Miguel Sabido, who had written the Mexican telenovela on educational entertainment, Ven conmigo (Come with Me, 1975) on adult literacy, was invited to India. Working with local writer, he helped created the series which tackled social issues like family planning, caste harmony, empowerment of women, national integration, dowry, alcoholism and drug abuse. Ven conimgo was in turned based on the Peruvian telenovela, Simplemente María (Simply Maria, 1969-1971).

The cast would meet for rehearsals at 3 pm at Himachal Bhavan, near Mandi House in Delhi, and thereafter a van would take them to a studio in suburb Gurgaon where it was shot.

== Reception ==
During its 17-month run, Ashok Kumar received over 400,000 letters from young viewers, asking him to convince their parents in marriage of their choice. The viewership of each episode was more than 50 millions.

== See also ==
- List of programs broadcast by DD National
