= Mahulbanir Sereng =

2004 Indian film

Mahulbonir Sereng
- DVD cover
- Directed by: Sekhar Das
- Written by: Tapan Bandyopadhyay
- Produced by: Sampa Bhattacharjee
- Starring: See below
- Cinematography: Premendu Bikash Chaki
- Edited by: Sumit Ghosh
- Music by: Indradip Dasgupta
- Release date: 13 February 2004
- Running time: 137 minutes
- Country: India
- Language: Bengali

Mahulbonir Sereng (Bengali: মেহুলবনীর সেরেঙ্গ Songs of Mahulbonir or Tribal song Mahulbonir) is a 2004 Bengali film directed by Sekhar Das based on a same name story of Tapan Bandyopadhyay This film was released at the 13th Brisbane International Film Festival 2004 and on 19 April 2005 at Filmfest DC in Washington, D.C.

== Plot ==
The story is a narrative revolving around the love triangle of Aghore (Pijush Ganguly), with his wife Saheli (Chandrayee Ghosh) and Dr. Alaktak Roy (Silajit Majumder). Aghore is a police constable who works in a different place so he often stays out of his hometown. In the meantime, his wife Saheli gets close with the new young doctor of their village. When Aghore comes back, he gets news that Saheli is pregnant and becomes very happy. But all of villagemen claim that the baby is the doctor's and not Aghore's. Though Aghore tries to argue in favour of his wife and doctor but the village head calls 'Gira' by gram Panchayet (Judgement by 10 village heads). On the day of 'Gira' Saheli commits suicide and the narrator Damayanti (Roopa Ganguly) helps the doctor to run away. Another parallel story of Damayanti and Somesh Gomes (Sabyasachi Chakrabarty) is also told. Somesh is a social worker, the love interest of Damayanti who is the B.D.O. of that tribal area. Twelve years after this incident Damayanti comes back to the village of Mahulbani and finds that besides many changes the beauty and simplicity of nature still exists.

== Cast ==
- Sabyasachi Chakrabarty as Somesh Gomes
- Roopa Ganguly as Damayanti
- Arindam Sil as husband of Damayanti
- Aparajita Auddy
- Chandrayee Ghosh as Saheli
- Debshankar Halder
- Debesh Roy Chowdhury
- Pijush Ganguly as Aghore
- Silajit Majumder as Dr Alatak Roy
- Kunal Mitra as Damayanti's Senior Officer
