= Sekhar Das =

Indian film director

- Occupation: Film director

Sekhar Das (Bengali: শেখর দাশ; alternately spelled Shekhar Das) is a Bengali film and theatre director, scriptwriter/playwright, actor and producer. He has directed twelve feature films, of which four features were made for television release and others for theatre release.Sekhar Das won national and International awards.

== Early life ==
Graduating from the University of Calcutta in both science and English literature, Das then opted for diploma in film studies and appreciation in the Chitrabani (Communication center of St. Xaviers College, Calcutta)keeping his Masters incomplete. Das, primarily took interest in the Art of Screenplay writing and acting.

== Career ==
After resigning from his corporate career in 1997, Das began his career in films and television as a director. He directed mystery thrillers for a TV channel, and adapted several works by Russian playwright Anton Chekhov into Bengali for TV films. A globetrotter, Das was associated with a travelogue program for a TV channel for nearly three years as a presenter, writer and director. This program covered Europe, Asia, and Australia.

He served on juries for international film festivals, was a jury member for India's national awards, and was selected as one of the selection committee members for nominating Indian film for the Oscar.

== Theatre days ==
While working for an insurance company, Das lost interest in cinema and concentrated in theatre arts. He produced and directed plays which included Sophocles' Oedipus, Chekhov's Uncle Vanya, Tagore's Visarjan (The Sacrifice), Tasher Desh (The Land of Cards), Rather Rashi (The Rope of the Chariot), Jean-Paul Sartre's Condemned of Altona, Arrabal's Picnique in the Battlefield, Dario Foe's Can't Pay, Won't Pay, Athol Fugard's Road to Mecca and Arnold Weskar's trilogy. He performed as an actor also.

== Filmography ==
From 1997 to 2000, Das wrote for television programs and directed short films and long videos. In 2000, he stopped working in television to concentrate his work on films.

He adapted four plays of Anton Chekhov, (Three Sisters, Uncle Vanya, The Seagull, Cherry Orchard) for Television.

The following are the films Das made for theatre release:

- Mahulbanir Sereng (Songs of Mahulbani) – script and direction. His debut with the film Mahulbanir Sereng, was based on the story by Tapan Bandyopadhyay. The film was marked as the first ever Bengali film that dealt comprehensively with the lives in the forest (Jangolmohal). It featured songs, and its concept offered a view of nature, the tribal people, their struggle, romance and agony. It was honored in the Indian Panorama and won 11 awards conferred upon by BFJA.
- Krantikaal (Critical Encounter) – script and direction. His second film Krantikaal, based on the story by Prafulla Roy, dealt with the secessionist problems of the North-Eastern part of India and its treatment. The government of India selected the film for international viewing in seven international languages. This low-budget experimental film was also honored in the Indian Panorama, received two National awards, four International awards and six BFJA awards.
- Kaler Rakhal (The Understudy) – script and direction. By his third film Kaler Rakhal, a musical which portrayed lives of 'Bahurupis' (the itinerant performers). Das added another entry to his 'Outsiders' series, completing the trilogy on 'contemporary social issues'.
- Necklace – script and direction. A comedy dedicated to the 50-year celebration of French new wave. It was screened in India, USA and Canada. This has been Das' first part of the "Kolkata" trilogy.
- Nayanchampar Dinratri (The Tale of Nayanchampa) – story, script and direction. Centered around a day of a Maid's life, the story revolves around 'Nayanchampa' (Roopa Ganguly), a middle-aged lady representing thousands of women of rural India. They start their journey in the early dawn and travel around 8 hours a day to reach the city, serve different households to earn their livelihood and return home in the night when they again work hard to feed their family. The film was shot in the documentary style during monsoon, in the rain-soaked city of Kolkata and around different suburb locations with a handheld camera. This has been Das' 2nd part of "Kolkata" trilogy.
- ESP: Ekti Rohoshshyo Golpo (ESP: A film fantastic) – script and direction. The film focuses on Paula and her nocturnal hallucinations over her loving husband, Spandan. Their physician dismisses her symptoms as relating to insomnia. Their charming, young paying guest, Banya, is a student of psychology. Banya discovers that Paula has an uncanny ability to predict the future. She connects her condition to that of Extra Sensory Perception (ESP), which her professor of para-psychology, Dr. Maity confirms when Paula undergoes Zener card tests. Further findings indicate that Paula is under severe trauma due to her past. At the time of her puberty, a temple priest had physically abused her. He now visits her every night in her hallucinations.
- Jogajog (Communication) – script and direction. The film is a contemporary interpretation of Rabindranath Tagore's classic novel (written on 1927 and later adopted to drama, 1930's). The plot revolves around the underlying rivalry between two families — the Chatterjees (Biprodas), aristocrats now on the decline and the Ghosals (Madhusudan), representing neo-bourgeoisie and arrogance. Biprodas Chatterjee is a vociferous supporter of equal dignity and rights for women. Kumudini, Biprodas' sister, is caught between the two as she is married off to Madhusudan. She was brought up in a sheltered home where she had followed the traditional way of life and observed all the religious rituals. Her mental image of the husband is as someone who embodies all the qualities of the God (Lord Krishna) she worships. Now, she is rudely shaken by the crude display of wealth and power by Madhusudan. Although brought up to be a good and submissive wife, she resents at the idea of sharing the conjugal bed. But for Madhusudan money means power and marriage means sex, he repeatedly tries to use this to jeer at Kumudini's family; his natural vulgarity, the coarseness of his speech, his arrogant discourtesy, which makes Kumudini's whole being shrink every moment. Soon Kumudini retreats to her shell of spirituality, but a time finally comes when Kumudini cannot take it anymore and she returns to her brother's house, only to realize that she is pregnant. Eventually an unwilling Kumudini is persuaded to return to the Ghoshals. The film also highlights marital rape. Kumudini is subjected to marital rape by Madhusudan. There is also a sexual liaison between Madhusudan and Shyamasundari who was the widow of Madhusudan's elder brother.

=== Director ===
- 4 great Chekhov Plays (2001)

==== Full length plays adapted for television release ====
- Tin Bon (Three sisters)
- Bhola Mama (Uncle Vanya)
- Balaka (The Seagul)
- Golap Kutir (Cherry Orchard)

==== Films made for theatre release ====
- Mahulbanir Sereng [Songs of Mahulbani] (2004)
- Krantikaal [Critical encounter] (2005)
- Kaaler Rakhal [The Understudy] (2008)
- Bishnu Dey [documentary film] (2010)
- Necklace (2011)
- E S P (unreleased, 2012)
- Nayan Chapar Dinratri (The tale of Nayanchampa) (unreleased, 2013)
- Jogajog (Relationships) (2015)

== Screenplay and dialogue ==
- "Chekhov Plays" (2001) for television
- Mahulbanir Sereng (Songs Of Mahulbani) 2004
- Krantikaal (Critical Encounter) 2005
- Kaler Rakhal (The Understudy) 2008
- Necklace (2010)
- E S P-A film fantastic (2012)
- Nayanchampar dinratri (The tale of Nayanchampa) 2013
- Jogajog (Relationships) 2015

== Awards ==
- Mahulbanir Sereng: Best film, best director, best screenplay, best art director, best character actor, best story from BFJA, in Indian Panoama 2003
- Krantikaal: Best regional film National award (2005), best character actor, National award. Best Director in 9th Dhaka International Film Festival. Best actor (Roopa Ganguly) in 9th Dhaka International Film Festival, Best film from Signis award (Belgium), special jury, Osien cinefan. Indian Panorama 2005
- Kaler Rakhal: Best achievement of the year (2008) from BFJA, Best sound design from Ahmedabad international

== See also ==
- Mahulbanir Sereng
- Krantikaal
