= Gurcharan Singh (painter) =

Indian painter (born 1949)

- Born: 1949 (age 76–77); Patiala, Punjab, India
- Occupation: Painter
- Known for: Figurative paintings

Gurcharan Singh is an Indian painter, known for his figurative paintings. He was born in 1949 at Patiala, in the Indian state of Punjab and studied at Government College of Arts and Crafts, Chandigarh. He has had several and group exhibitions in India and abroad and his works were exhibited at the International Biennale in Tokyo in 1984, at the Contemporary Art Show in Seoul in 1986 and the Festival of Contemporary Art in London in 1988. The Lalit Kala Akademi, New Delhi, National Gallery of Modern Art, New Delhi and India House, Paris have his on display at their premises. His signature paintings are based on the people from financially compromised classes; The Red Light in Black and White and Les Miserables are two of his notable works.

== See also ==
- National Gallery of Modern Art
