= Tapan Bandyopadhyay =

Bengali author

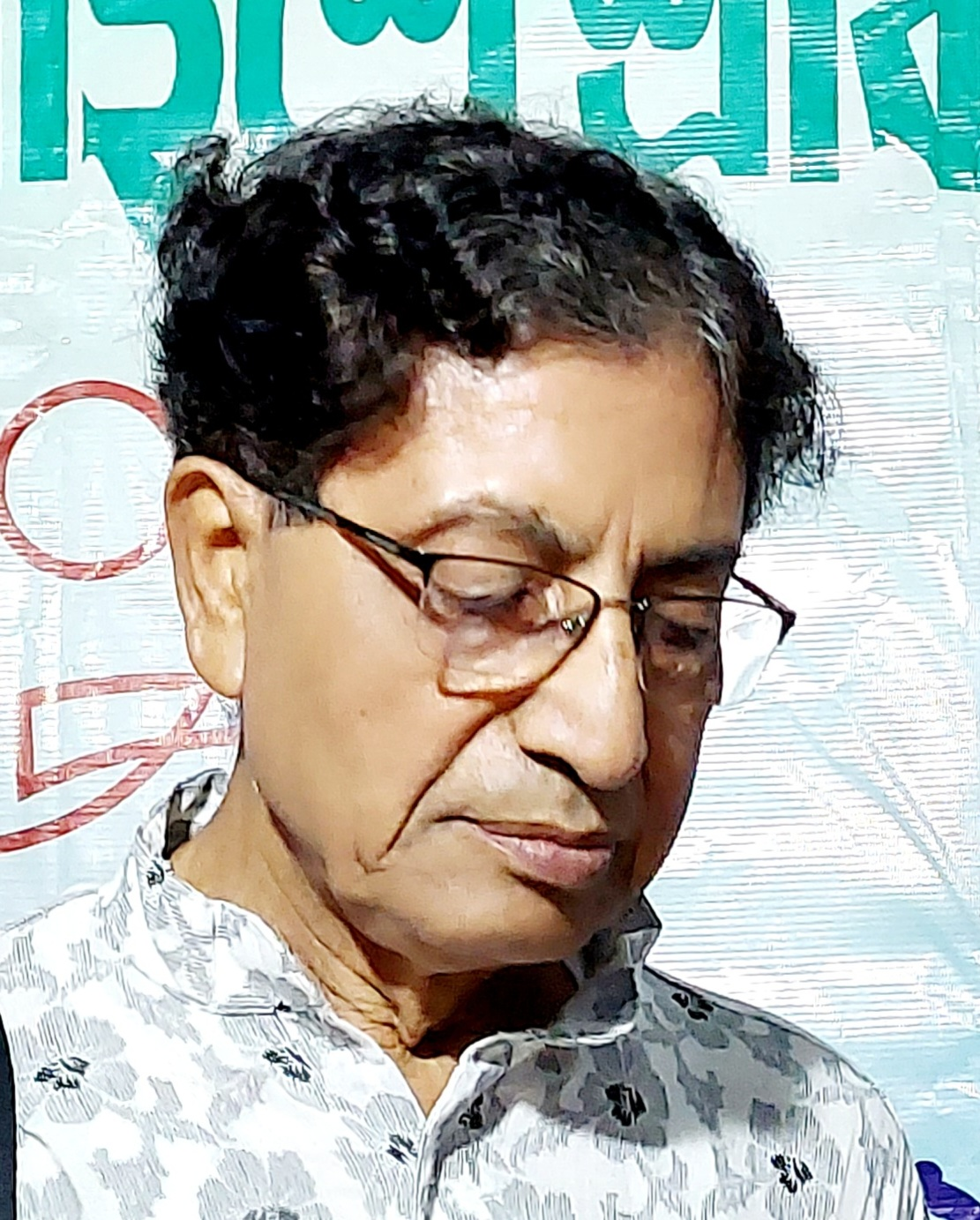
Tapan Bandopadhyay

Tapan Bandyopadhyay (born 7 June 1947) is an eminent Bengali novelist. He won the Sahitya Akademi Award in 2022 for his novel Birbal.

== Early life ==
Tapan Bandyopadhyay was born in 1947 in Satkhira District. His family migrated from East Pakistan (now Bangladesh) in 1947 and settled in Baduria near Basirhat. Bandyopadhyay passed School final examination from Baduria London Missionary Society High School. He joined in Asutosh College in Kolkata and passed Mathematics Hon's with first class. Bandyopadhyay joined in WBCS service in 1972 and retired as Secretary of Shishu Kishore Akademy under the Government of West Bengal.

== Literary career ==
Initially Bandyopadhyay started his literary career as poet, latter he was known as a novelist and short story writer. Almost three hundred short stories of Bandopadhyay were published in various magazine and books. In 2010 he delegated Beijing 17th International Book fair, as an Indian author. He created a lady Bengali detective character Goenda Gargi. In 2019, Bandopadhyay received Sahitya Akademi translation award for translating Sitakanta Mahapatra’s Odia poem collection Bharatbarsha.

== Notable awards ==
- Amritalok Award (2001)
- Bankim Puraskar (2002)
- Panchajanya Award (2003)
- BFJA Award (2004)
- Roygunakar Bharatchandra Award (2005)
- Rupashi Bangla Award (2009)
- Tarashankar Smriti Award (2011)
- Sahitya Akademi Award (2022)
