= Ganadevta =

1988 TV series

- Based on: Ganadevata by Tarashankar Bandyopadhyay
- Directed by: P. Kumar Vasudev
- Starring: Rohit Ohri; Roopa Ganguly; Rohini Hattangadi; Rajat Kapoor
- Country of origin: India
- Original language: Hindi
- No. of seasons: 1

Production
- Running time: 25 minutes

Original release
- Network: DD National

Ganadevta is a 1988 Indian TV series broadcast on Doordarshan. Directed by P. Kumar Vasudev, the series is based on Tarashankar Bandyopadhyay's much acclaimed Bengali novel Ganadevata. Set against the backdrop of British Raj in the twentieth century, the series documents Dalit uprising against the exploitation of the rich upper caste in a rural area. The plot revolves around Debnath Ghosh, who intends to bring an end to the oppressive system run by the vile landlord and village-chief. It stars Rohit Ohri (Note: Rohit Ohri is the executive chairman of Dentsu India. During his college days he was a part of Shyamanand Jalan's theatre group Padatik.) in the lead.

== Plot ==
In the twentieth century, in Shibkalipur, a village in Bengal, Aniruddha Karmakar is the only blacksmith and Girish Sutradhar is the only carpenter. Aniruddha and Girish have set up their respective retail stores in the local market. Thus their unavailability has led to the trouble and discontent among the peasantry in the village. In a rural assembly held to address this issue, Aniruddha claims that both he and Girish are subject to injustice as they have not been receiving the due share of harvest in exchange of their service, over a long span of years. Aniruddha further exposes that he has been deceived by Chiru Pal, the village-chief who has not provided the former with his due share of paddy. Chiru Pal who is present at the assembly, objects to this allegation, claiming that Aniruddha owes him a certain amount he has not paid yet. Aniruddha leaves and then returns with the money to pay Chiru Pal. He receives the handnote from Chiru Pal and declares that neither he nor Girish will serve the villagers any longer. He further adds that he does not have reliance on the assembly as it cannot check Chiru Pal's arrogance and injustice.

The next morning, Aniruddha discovers that the half-ripened paddy from his land has secretly been harvested. He tells his wife Padma that he suspects Chiru Pal to be the culpable one. He attempts to go to the police station to lodge an official complaint against Chiru Pal. He is dissuaded by Padma who tells him that an official complaint against Chiru Pal will turn unwise as no one will witness against him, whereas Jagannath Ghosh, the village doctor instigates him to go to the police station. He goes to the police station. The police come and investigate in vain. Patu complains to the landlord against Chiru Pal's illicit relationship withsister Durga. This infuriates Chiru Pal and he sets fire to the houses of innocent people of the lower class of the village. Anyway he then appears to help them pretending to be the saviour. Debnath has to go to jail after he attempts to obstruct a government survey work in the village. After Debnath Ghosh goes to jail, Jatin, a young Swadeshi activist, comes to Shivkalipur village under arrest. Anyway, Jatin manages to continue his swadeshi act. Durga tells the inspector to rent the house outside Aniruddha's house for Jatin to stay in. Jatin and Padma gradually develop a mother-son relationship.

When Debu returns, Jatin forms a meeting and committee with him. He forms a social movement to save Shivkalipur, which is plagued by poverty, misery, and disease. He intends to awaken the patriotic spirit among the common people and tries to protect the tradition of his ancestors who overthrew the British rule and built Dighi Sarovar.

== Cast ==
- Rohit Ohri as Debnath Ghosh
- Roopa Ganguly as Durga
- Ashok Singh as Chiru Pal
- Rohini Hattangadi
- Anjul Chaturvedi as Munna / Khokhon
- Mita Chatterjee
- Rajat Kapoor
- Talluri Rameswari
- Zahir Anwar

== Accolades ==
Year	Title	Category	Nominee	Result	Ref.
1989	Uptron Award	Best TV serial	P. Kumar Vasudev	Nominated	
1989	Uptron Award	Best actor	Rohit Orhi	Nominated	
