= Denapaona =

Short story by Rabindranath Tagore

- Short story by Rabindranath Tagore
- Country: India
- Language: Bengali

Publication

Denapaona (Bengali: দেনাপাওনা; English: "The Matrimonial Deal" or "Debit and Credit") is a Bengali short story written by Rabindranath Tagore in 1891. It is a heart-rending story of Nirupama. The central theme of the story is dowry.

== Plot ==
Nirupama was a beautiful and matured daughter of Ramshundar Mitra. She was married to the son of Raybahadur. She was being tortured in the house of in-laws because her father could not meet the proposed dowry. Ramshunder sold his house for that but she forbade her father to give the dowry. Due to the tormenting life, She was extremely negligent about her own health and at last she died.
