= Half Serious =

2013 Indian film

- Film poster
- Directed by: Utsav Mukherjee
- Written by: Subhadeep Das & Utsav Mukherjee
- Produced by: HighDefinition Entertainment Pvt Ltd
- Cinematography: Chandan Goswami
- Edited by: Moloy Laha
- Music by: Joy Sarkar
- Release date: July 2013
- Country: India
- Language: Bengali

Half Serious is a 2013 Indian Bengali language film directed by Utsav Mukherjee. The film is a social satire which explores the themes of domestic violence and gender inequality.

On 26 July 2013, the producer of the proposed film Dyakh Kemon Lagey, the script which was claimed to be registered with the Eastern India Motion Picture Association in 2011, filed a suit in a Sealdah court complaining that Mukherjee's film was a copy of his. The court immediately issued an injunction, but removed it on 31 July 2013, on grounds that no similarity was found between the Half Serious script and the script that the complainant produced in court.

== Cast ==
- Roopa Ganguly
- Silajit Majumder
- Saheb Bhattacharya
- Mumtaz Sorcar as Tania
- Ridhima Ghosh
- Sudipta Chakraborty
