= Ganadevata (novel) =

Bengali novel written by Tarasankar Bandyopadhyay

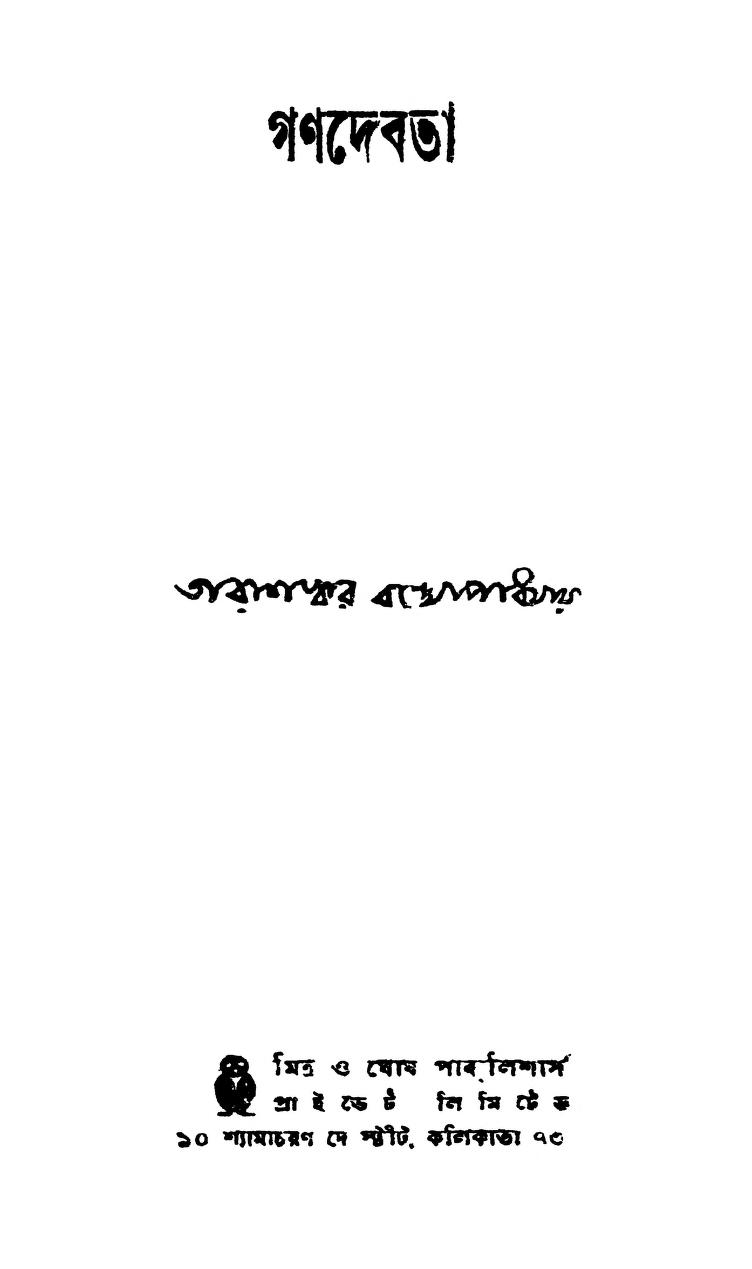
- First page of the novel
- Author: Tarasankar Bandyopadhyay
- Language: Bengali
- Genre: Novel
- Publication date: 1942
- Publication place: India

Ganadevata (Bengali: গণদেবতা, lit. 'People as God') is a 1942 Bengali novel by Tarasankar Bandyopadhyay. In 1966, he received the Jnanpith Award for it. Set in rural Bengal, the plot follows the lives of the villagers affected by poverty, ignorance and primitive instinct. It has been translated into several languages and was adapted into a 1978 film of the same name by Tarun Majumdar.

== Plot ==
In the twentieth century, in Shibkalipur, a village in Bengal, Aniruddha Karmakar is the only blacksmith and Girish Sutradhar is the only carpenter. They have set up their retail stores in the city across the Mayurakshi river because they did not get proper paddy and money in return for their work. As a result, the upper, middle and lower classes of the village were dissatisfied with them and held a meeting. In the meeting, Aniruddha Karmakar showed everyone his example and reasons and said that he could not do the work of the people of the village. And then every system of social control became a playground for unbridled arbitrariness, shameless self-interest and heartless demonic cruelty. Srihari Pal, the wealthy, irascible and cruel chief of Shivkalipur village, felt humiliated. He cut off Aniruddha's two bighas of half-ripened paddy. Seeing Aniruddha, the lower castes of the village, the barber, the shopkeeper, the looter, the cobbler, the washerman, all protested. They all said that no one would do any work without cash. Srihari, out of cruel revenge and in an attempt to make everyone loyal to him, set fire to the entire Harijan village. Except for Aniruddha, Girish the carpenter, Debu Ghosh and Jagan the doctor, all the other Harijan villagers were seized by Srihari's rice and survived under Srihari's shelter. Debnath alias Debu Ghosh had to go to jail for obstructing the government survey work and beating up Amin, an employee of the Survey Department. After Debu went to jail, a young man named Jatin suddenly got caught in the Swadeshi movement in the village and was taken into custody. Jatin, realizing that the society was deteriorating under the domination of Hindu society and socialites, raised his voice against the government and saved his life. When Debu returned, he formed a meeting and committee with him. He formed a social movement to save Shivkalipur, which was plagued by poverty, misery, and disease. He wanted to awaken the patriotic spirit among the common people and tried to protect the tradition of his ancestors who overthrew the British rule and built Dighi Sarovar.

== Screen adaptation ==
Characters	Title	
Characters	Ganadevata (1979)	Ganadevta (1988)
Debnath Ghosh	Soumitra Chatterjee	Rohit Orhi
Aniruddha Karmakar	Samit Bhanja	
Srihari Pal	Ajitesh Bandopadhyay	Ashok Singh
Jatin	Debraj Ray	
Haren Ghosal	Rabi Ghosh	
Durga	Sandhya Roy	Roopa Ganguly
Padma	Madhabi Mukherjee	

== Bibliography ==
- R. P. Malhotra (2005). Encyclopaedic Dictionary of Asian Novels and Novelists: A-I. Global Vision Publishing House. ISBN 978-81-8220-067-8.
- K. M. George (1992). Modern Indian Literature, an Anthology: Surveys and poems. Sahitya Akademi. ISBN 978-81-7201-324-0.
- Jasbir Jain (1 January 2000). Creating theory: writers on writing. Pencraft International. ISBN 978-81-85753-31-7.
