= Police Matthu Dada =

- Directed by: Thulasi-Shyam
- Written by: Chi. Udayashankar (Kannada dialogues); Tanveer Khan (Hindi dialogues)
- Screenplay by: Prayag Raj
- Story by: Tulasi-Shyam
- Produced by: R. F. Manik Chand; K. Nithyanand (Kannada version); R.F. Manikchand (Hindi version)
- Starring: Vishnuvardhan; Sangeeta Bijlani; Roopa Ganguly; Srinath
- Cinematography: Gangu Ramsay
- Edited by: Victor Yadav
- Music by: Bappi Lahiri
- Production company: Sri Kamakshi Films
- Distributed by: Sri Kamakshi Films
- Release date: 27 November 1991
- Country: India
- Languages: Kannada; Hindi

Police Matthu Dada is a 1991 Indian action film, directed by Thulasi-Shyam and produced by R. F. Manik Chand and K. Nithyanand. The film stars Vishnuvardhan, Sangeeta Bijlani, Roopa Ganguly and Srinath. The film has musical score by Bappi Lahiri. The film was simultaneously made in Kannada and Hindi, with the latter version titled Inspector Dhanush with a slightly different supporting cast.

== Cast ==
Actor (Hindi)	Actor (Kannada)	Role
Vishnuvardhan		Dhanush, Vishnu Pratap Rao
Sangeeta Bijlani		Sangeetha
Roopa Ganguly		Dhanush's wife
Suresh Oberoi	Srinath	Commissioner
Sadashiv Amrapurkar	Vajramuni	Nageshwar Chaudhary; Nageshwar Rao
Karan Shah	Balaraj	Dhanush's brother-in-law
Amita Nangia	Bhavyashree Rai	Dhanush's sister
Shivaram		constable
Sudheer		Apparao
Baby Guddu		Dhanush's daughter
Jack Gaud		Jack
Tiku Talsania	Ramesh Bhat	Photographer
Dalip Tahil	Balaraj	Babu, Nageshwar's henchman

- Vijay
- Jamuna
- Ramamurthy
- M. S. Karanth
- Seetharam
- Rathnakar
- Bangalore Nagesh
- M. S. Umesh
- Dingri Nagaraj
- Thyagaraj Urs
- Saikumar
- Manjayya
- Bemel Somanna
- Vikram Udayakumar

== Soundtrack ==
Kannada Soundtrack

1. O Nannase - S. Janaki, S. P. Balasubrahmanyam (SPB)
2. Ayyayya Ho - SPB
3. Laila Laila - K. S. Chithra
4. Naanu Garam Garam - S. Janaki, SPB
5. Ee Balla Geethike - S. Janaki
6. Nanna Manadali - K. S. Chithra, SPB

Hindi Soundtrack

Lyrics: Indeevar

1. "Aankhon Ka Noor Tu" - S. Janaki, S. P. Balasubrahmanyam
2. "Ayayia O Duniya" - S. P. Balasubrahmanyam
3. "Laila Laila (Honthon Ke Angarey Chhu Le)" - S. Janaki
4. "Mausam Garam Garam" - S. Janaki, S. P. Balasubrahmanyam
5. "Mera Suhaag Tu Mera Sindoor Tu" - S. Janaki
6. "Mere Bhi Mann Mein Hulchul" - S. Janaki, S. P. Balasubrahmanyam
