= Dutta Vs Dutta =

2012 Indian Bengali film

- Dutta Vs Dutta film poster
- Directed by: Anjan Dutt
- Written by: Anjan Dutt; Roopa Ganguly
- Produced by: Purnendu Roy, Nilakhi Roy
- Starring: Anjan Dutt; Ronodeep Bose; Arpita Chatterjee; Roopa Ganguly Kaushik Sen
- Edited by: Arghyakamal Mitra
- Music by: Neel Dutt
- Production companies: Orion Production & Communications Pvt Ltd
- Release date: 23 November 2012 (Kolkata)
- Running time: 124 minutes
- Country: India
- Language: Bengali

Dutta Vs Dutta is a 2012 Indian Bengali film directed by Anjan Dutt. This is Anjan Dutt's semi-autobiographical film. Most of the film has been shot in a house of Amherst Street in Kolkata. Anjan has described this house as that which resonated the feel of his old house of Beniapukur.

== Plot ==
Biren Dutta is a lawyer. He is unsuccessful in his career and does not have any client. His wife is an alcoholic. The couple have one son and one daughter. Biren Dutta has an extra-marital affair with his only client. Biren's daughter China first falls in love with Ghenti Kaku, who is of her father's age, and later, with a guy who is involved with Naxalite movement. She runs away with the latter without the permission of her parents. Biren's teenaged son, Rono, comes back from boarding school since Biren can no longer afford pay school fees. Biren wants Rono to be a barrister but Rono wants to become an actor. Biren's father, who had once left the house, suddenly returns. He starts a music school in the house. The music school starts to have a positive impact on the family. China comes back with her Naxal husband and is accepted by her father. The couple later settle in the US. One of Rono's Naxalite friends takes shelter in the house to evade the police. Biren, unaware of this, has an altercation with the police when they come to the house searching for the boy. The police take him away to a police station, where he is beaten up, and drop him home 3 days later. Biren suffers a major setback and stops talking to anyone. In the end, Rono gets a role in a film by Mrinal Sen (Anjan Dutta's first film was also with Mrinal Sen). The film ends on that positive note.

== Credit ==
=== Cast ===
- Anjan Dutt as Biren Dutta
- Ronodeep Bose as Rono (Biren Dutta's teenage son)
- Arpita Chatterjee as China (Biren Dutta's daughter)
- Rita Koiral as Rita (Biren Dutta's wife)
- Kaushik Sen as Khoka da, a Naxalite (China's husband)
- Shankar Chakraborty as Ghenti Kaku
- Deepankar De as Biren's father/Rono's grandfather
- Roopa Ganguly as Runu
- Somak Ghosh (RJ Somak) as Doi
- Parno Mittra as Nandita aka. Diana
- Srijit Mukherji as Tony Mukherjee
- Subhasish Mukherjee as Paran

=== Crew ===
- Writer and Director: Anjan Dutt
- Production:
  - Producers: Purnendu Roy, Nilakhi Roy
  - Co producer: Genesis Hospital
  - Executive producer: Sanjay Pathak
- Music director: Neel Dutt
- Editor: Arghyakamal Mitra
- Production controller: Bipin Mukherjee
- Costume design: Chanda Dutt
- Graphic design: Arnab Dasgupta

== Filming ==
In this film director Anjan Dutt has tried to revive Calcutta of the 1970s, a period when the city evidenced emergence of rock music bands, the arrival of Hippie culture and also the Naxalite movement. In an interview he told–

Unlike other films which have the shade of the Naxalite violence, Dutta Vs Dutta has taken a different direction. I have tried to recapture the turbulent College Street, the pub culture of Park Street and the emergence of Gautam Chattopadhyay.

Arpita Paul gave full credit to the director for the realistic portrayal of her character. She told– "It is a very different kind of movie by Anjanda with realistic elements that would help the audience to relate to the period and the characters... "

Indraneil Sengupta, another actor of the film told– "Everybody in the cast acted their part to bring back that era, which rocked Kolkata and neighbourhood, about which we heard so many things, alive."

== Critical reception ==
Professional ratings
Review scores
Source	Rating
Anandabazar Patrika	9/10
The Times of India	3.5/5 stars

The film received positive reviews. According to Anandabazar Patrika critic Sangeeta Bandyopadhyay, this was Anjan Dutt's best film. This opinion was supported by another Bengali newspaper Ei Samay too. Anandabazar Patrika gave the film 9 out of 10. The Times of India gave it 3 1/2 stars out of 5 stars and wrote "the plot comes across as a total mishmash and therefore, loses punch".

== Songs ==
No.	Title	Music	Singer(s)	Length
1.	"Bhalobeshe Sakhi"	Rabindra Nath Tagore	Rupankar Bagchi and Somlata Acharyya Chowdhury	03:46
2.	"Somewhere"	Neel Dutt	Neel Dutt
3.	"Tobu Jodi"	Neel Dutt	Rupankar Bagchi	4:24
4.	"Uthogo Bharatalakkhi"	Atul Prasad Sen	Anjan Dutt and Somlata
5.	"Dutta Vs Dutta Theme"	Neel Dutt	Anjan Dutt and Neel Dutt
