= Namte Namte =

2013 Bengali-language film by Rana Basu

- Movie poster
- Directed by: Rana Basu
- Screenplay by: Rana Dasgupta
- Story by: Aditi Majumdar
- Based on: Dibyendu Palit's story – "Trata"
- Produced by: Pritam Kundu
- Starring: Rajatava Dutta; Roopa Ganguly; Saswata Chatterjee; Bhaswar Chattopadhyay; Sanchita
- Edited by: Snehasish Ganguly
- Music by: Sidhu
- Distributed by: 3 eDots Productions
- Release date: 2 February 2013 (Kolkata)
- Running time: 2 hrs 4 min
- Country: India
- Language: Bengali

Namte Namte (English: Into the Abyss) is a 2013 Bengali film. The film was directed by Rana Basu and produced under the banner of 3 eDots Productions. The film's music was composed by Sidhu. The film was released on 8 February 2013. The film is based on the story Trata, written by Dibyendu Palit.

== Plot ==
The film revolves around a typical middle-class family of Bengal. Ananda (Rajatava Dutta) is a very meek guy and is scared of confronting people. He is a peace-loving man and very shy in nature. He works as a clerk in a government office. His wife Seema (Roopa Ganguly) is however a spirited woman and remains tense about him and her family. They have a college-going daughter Dolon (Sanchita) and a son, Suman who studies in Class 9 and stays in the school hostel. To get rid of their daily ordeal, Ananda asks for help from a small-time goon Tota a.k.a. Ganesh Halder (Saswata Chatterjee). Tota is the leader of the club in their locality. The club members call themselves as 'saviors' but are engaged in anti-social activities. Ananda is scared of the rowdy members of the club, so he decided to satisfy them by paying a very high amount of money for the Saraswati Puja celebration. In return, Tota promised Ananda to help him if he ever gets into trouble. But Tota gives evidence of his dishonest intentions by coming inside Ananda's house in his absence on the pretext of asking for a glass of water. After that, Seema no longer wanted to live in the locality. Meanwhile, Dolon needed a tutor and Sudeb (Bhaswar Chattopadhyay) is the chosen for the job, who later developed intimate relationships with her and eventually went through a physical relationship caught by Seema. Enraged Ananda asks Tota to stop Sudeb from visiting his daughter. In return Tota wants to meet Dolon privately in the club. Sensing something may go wrong, Seema insists Ananda to take Dolon to her grandmother's house for a few days in spite of Ananda being afraid of Tota's wrath. That night Tota attacks the family and in order to protect Ananda his wife Seema seduces Tota and Tota being invoked rapes her in the house as Ananda stays outside and repents for the incident.

== Theme ==
"The story was written 23 years ago and at that time the political party that ruled Bengal is longer in power. Trata highlighted how goons got political patronage back then. What I wanted to tell through my story is that every political party has posha goonda (pet goon)! Every para goonda (local goon), don or mafia is looked after by political parties, or else they cannot function. This bit is there in my film."

— Rana Basu

The story is about ordinary people who mess up their lives in the urban culture. A story about all of them around the world – across geographical frontiers, regardless of caste, creed and religion. The story is a portrayal of the rat like existence of the middle class. The middle class survives in an atmosphere of fear – both known and unknown. They are most vociferous at meetings and rallies – but they can be silent too. This dilemma engulfs their whole life and the onward road is unsure, beset with ifs and buts.

== Cast ==
- Rajatava Dutta as Ananda
- Roopa Ganguly as Seema
- Saswata Chatterjee as Tota a.k.a. Ganesh Halder
- Bhaswar Chattopadhyay as Sudeb
- Sanchita as Dolon

== See also ==
- The Light: Swami Vivekananda
- Loveria
- Megh Roddur
