= Krantikaal =

2005 Bengali-language film by Sekhar Das

- DVD cover
- Directed by: Sekhar Das
- Written by: Prafulla Roy
- Produced by: Shampa Bhattacharjee
- Starring: Silajit Majumder; Roopa Ganguly; Soumitra Chatterjee; Haradhan Bandopadhyay
- Cinematography: Premendu Bikash Chaki
- Edited by: Debkanta Chakraborty
- Music by: Chirodip Dasgupta
- Release date: 23 December 2005
- Language: Bengali

Krantikaal (Bengali: ক্রান্তিকাল, transl. Critical Encounter) is an Indian Bengali feature film directed by Sekhar Das of Mahulbanir Sereng fame. It stars Roopa Ganguly, Silajit Majumder and Soumitra Chatterjee. The film won Best Direction award at the 9th Dhaka International Film Festival.

== Plot ==
The story is of terrorism that is plaguing different parts of the Northeast as the backdrop. Rajib, a militant on the run, takes refuge in a dilapidated mansion. Roopa Ganguly stays there with her father-in-law Soumitra Chatterjee and his father Haradhan Bandopadhyay who is confined to bed and is unable to speak. This film focuses on the friction and undercurrent of tension between the lady of the house and the terrorist. It leads to a brief mutual self-discovery that gives rise to compassion.

== Cast ==
- Roopa Ganguly as Subarna Sinha
- Soumitra Chatterjee as Pratap Chandra Sinha
- Silajit Majumder as Rajib Ray
- Haradhan Bandopadhyay
- Arjun Chakraborty
- Rita Dutta Chakraborty
- Rajesh Sharma
- Arkapriya Ganguly

== Awards ==
- 2005 - National Film Award for Best Supporting Actor for Haradhan Bandopadhyay
- 2005 - National Film Award for Best Feature Film in Bengali
- BFJA Awards (2006)
  - Best Actor Soumitra Chatterjee
  - Best Actor in a Supporting Role Haradhan Bandopadhyay
  - Best Cinematography : Premendu Bikash Chaki
  - Best Director Sekhar Das
  - Best Music Chiradip Dasgupta
  - Best actress Roopa Ganguly at the Dhaka International Film Festival
  - Best Director Sekhar Das at the Dhaka International Film Festival
  - Best film Signis award, Belgium
