= Partha Sen =

Indian economist

Partha Sen (born 4 November 1951) is an Indian professor of economics, associated with the Delhi School of Economics. His research interests are International Trade, Macroeconomic Theory, and International Finance.

== Early life and education ==
Partha Sen was born on 4 November 1951. In 1972, he completed a Bachelor of Arts in Economics at the University of Delhi, and a Master of Arts in Economics in 1975. In 1979, he was awarded an MSocSci in Economics by the University of Birmingham. He received his PhD from the London School of Economics in 1984.

== Career ==
Upon receiving his MA, he became a lecturer at University of Delhi. He has also lectured in economics at the University of Bristol and the London School of Economics.

Between 1986 and 1989, he was an assistant professor at the University of Illinois. Between 1990 and 1996, he was a reader in economics at the Delhi School of Economics. Since 2001, he has been a professor of economics, first at the Indian Statistical Institute and at the Delhi School of Economics. For a brief period he was also a professor at the South Asian University.

His research interests are International Trade, Macroeconomic Theory, and International Finance. His current research focuses on capital flows, New Keynesian Macroeconomics, Non Competitive Trade Theory, and Environmental Economics with Capital Mobility.

He was the editor of the Indian Economic Review from 1997 to 2001 and the co-editor before that from 1994 to 1997. He has also been a member of the editorial board of Arthaniti since 2002.
