= Pyar Ka Devta =

- DVD cover
- Directed by: K. Bapayya
- Written by: Kader Khan (dialogues)
- Screenplay by: Gyandev Agnihotri
- Story by: Balamurugan
- Produced by: Lalit Kapoor
- Starring: Mithun Chakraborty; Madhuri Dixit
- Cinematography: A. Venkat
- Edited by: Waman Bhonsle; Gurudutt Shirali
- Music by: Laxmikant–Pyarelal
- Production company: Amit Arts
- Release date: 11 January 1991
- Running time: 135 minutes
- Country: India
- Language: Hindi

Pyar Ka Devta (transl. God of Love) is a 1991 Indian Hindi-language film directed by K. Bapayya. It stars Mithun Chakraborty and Madhuri Dixit in lead roles.

== Cast ==
- Mithun Chakraborty as Vijay Kumar
- Madhuri Dixit as Radha
- Roopa Ganguly as Shardha Kumar
- Bharat Bhushan as Doctor
- Nirupa Roy as Parvati Kumar
- Moushumi Chatterjee as Chief Justice Saraswati Manohar Rai
- Raj Kiran as Advocate Gopal
- Aruna Irani as Prem Pyari
- Asrani as Dhakare
- Kader Khan as Pritam
- Shakti Kapoor as Dilip
- Aparajita Bhushan as Laxmi
- Mangal Dhillon as Murli M. Rai
- Shraddha Verma as Sangeeta Kumar
- Kishori Shahane as Sujata Kumar
- Suresh Oberoi as Inspector Arun
- Yunus Parvez as Potential in law of Vijay

== Music ==
No.	Title	Singer(s)	Length
1.	"Jind Tera Naam Kar Di"	Lata Mangeshkar, Mohammed Aziz
2.	"Kuchh Der Pehle Kuchh"	Alka Yagnik, Mohammed Aziz
3.	"Main Najuk Dil Shehzadi"	Kavita Krishnamurthy
4.	"Meri Dukan Pe Ana Meri Jaan"	Sudesh Bhosale
5.	"Behnen Hasti Hai To"	Mohammed Aziz, Alka Yagnik, Kavita Krishnamurthy
6.	"Behnen Hasti Hai To (Sad)"	Mohammed Aziz, Alka Yagnik, Kavita Krishnamurthy
