= Na Hannyate =

- Movie poster
- Directed by: Riingo Banerjee
- Screenplay by: Riingo Banerjee
- Story by: Riingo Banerjee
- Based on: The Great Tangsan Earthquake by Zhang Ling
- Starring: Roopa Ganguly; Sayani Datta; Rahul; Priyanka Sarkar; Chaiti Ghosal
- Music by: Sriram Yusuf (Dibyendu Mukherjee)
- Production companies: Srijita Films & Entertainment
- Release date: 16 November 2012
- Country: India
- Language: Bengali

Na Hannyate (Note: Spelling according to Telegraph (Calcutta)) is a 2012 Indian Bengali-language disaster drama film directed by Riingo Banerjee. The story of the film is inspired by Zhang Ling's novella The Great Tangshan Earthquake.

== Cast ==
- Rahul Banerjee
- Priyanka Sarkar
- Roopa Ganguly
- Debshankar Haldar
- Dibyendu Mukherjee
- Sayani Datta
- Chaiti Ghoshal

== See also ==
- Charuulata 2011, 2012 Bengali film
