= Yugant =

- DVD cover for Yugant.
- Directed by: Aparna Sen
- Written by: Aparna Sen
- Produced by: NFDC
- Starring: Anjan Dutt; Roopa Ganguly
- Release date: 1995
- Running time: 121 mins
- Language: Bengali

Yugant (English: What the Sea Said) is a 1995 Bengali drama movie directed by Aparna Sen. The movie featured Anjan Dutt and Roopa Ganguly.

== Plot ==
Deepak and Anasuya are an estranged couple, now leading separate lives in Cuttack and Bombay. They meet again after 18 months of separation, at a small fishing village where they had once honeymooned. Though driven apart by their careers, Deepak and Anasuya realize that their feelings for each other have not changed, and slowly they struggle for reconciliation.

Though this may be the story's outline (a fictional line for screenplay), the film really speaks about the Gulf war (war for Oil) and its impact on our environment, living creatures and humans.

== Cast ==
- Anjan Dutt as Deepak
- Rupa Ganguly as Anasuya
- Pallavi Chatterjee as Joyeeta
- Kunal Mitra as Bhaiya
- Anil Lenka as Raghu
- Asrumochan Mohanty as Young Fisherman
- Subrata Nandy as Old Fisherman
- Neema Rahman as Young Fisherwoman

== Awards ==
- 1995 : National Film Awards
  - Best Feature Film in Bengali
  - Best Choreography: Ileana Citaristi
