= Antarmahal =

- Directed by: Rituparno Ghosh
- Story by: Tarasankar Bandyopadhyay
- Produced by: Anil Kuriakose
- Starring: Roopa Ganguly; Soha Ali Khan; Jackie Shroff; Abhishek Bachchan
- Cinematography: Avik Mukhopadhyay
- Edited by: Arghyakamal Mitra
- Release date: 28 October 2005
- Country: India
- Language: Bengali

Antarmahal is a 2005 Indian Bengali film, directed by Rituparno Ghosh and produced by Amitabh Bachchan Corporation. The film is based on a Bengali short story named Pratima by Tarasankar Bandyopadhyay. Set in the late 19th century, the plot revolves around two women who are married to a vainglorious Bengali landlord who exploits them to obtain social status. It stars Jackie Shroff, Roopa Ganguly, Soha Ali Khan, Abhishek Bachchan, Mrinal Mukherjee, Sumanta Mukherjee and Biswajit Chakraborty.

The film received widespread critical acclaim. Screen Daily writes, "Rituparno Ghosh spins another sumptuous, yet intimate family story with Antarmahal: Views From The Inner Chamber, playing once morein the same register he successfully used two years ago for fellow Locarno competitor Chokher Bali."

== Plot ==
The story takes place towards the end of the 19th century in Bengal. Bhubaneswar Chowdhury, a zamindar of Bakuldanga plans to please the British so that they bestow on him the Raibahadur title. There are quite a few contenders and so something unique has to be done, so he decides to put Queen Victoria's face on the body of the goddess Durga whose clay idol is made every year for Durga Pooja.

On the other hand, he also wants an heir and since he blames the failure on his elder wife Mahamaya (Roopa Ganguly) he marries again, the much younger Jashomati (Soha Ali Khan). Both of these wives compete against each other in an ego struggle. In his pursuit for a son, Bhubaneswar rapes Jashomati every night while a priest reads hymns for conception near the bed, ordering Mahamaya, in a drugged state, to fulfill the carnal desires of five sexually deprived Brahmin priests.

Although she luckily escapes the fate due to the untimely ending, Jashomati, while in her traumatised and lonely state, gets physically drawn towards a young sculptor (Abhishek Bachchan). It's in this centre of all this that the sculptor makes his masterpiece, his tribute, and seals Jashomati's ultimate fate.

== Cast ==
- Jackie Shroff as Bhubaneshwar Chowdhury, the landlord of Bakuldanga
- Roopa Ganguly as Mahamaya, elder wife of Bhubaneshwar
- Soha Ali Khan as Jashomoti, younger wife of Bhubaneshwar, voice dubbed by Rimjhim Mitra
- Abhishek Bacchan as Brijbhushan
- Mrinal Mukherjee as a Hindu priest
- Sumanta Mukherjee as Taracharan, the estate manager of Bakuldanga
- Biswajit Chakraborty as Bhattacharya Moshai, a Hindu priest
- Ratna Ghoshal as Mangala, the chief maid-servant of Mahamaya
- Dola Chakraborty as Tarini
- Shibani Bhattacharya
- Peter Taylor as the painter
- Debesh Mukherjee as Pal Moshai
- Arpan Bashar
- Kameshwar Mishra as Hariya
- Raima Sen (Cameo) as Rukmini, Brijbhushan's wife
