= Abosheshey =

2011 Indian film

- Directed by: Aditi Roy
- Screenplay by: Neel B Mitra
- Produced by: Anil B Dev
- Starring: Roopa Ganguly; Raima Sen; Ankur Khanna
- Cinematography: Ranjan Palit
- Edited by: Abhro Banerjee
- Music by: Prabuddha Banerjee
- Release date: 2011
- Running time: 118 minutes
- Country: India
- Language: Bengali

Abosheshey (transl. At the End of it All) is a 2011 Indian film in Bengali starring Roopa Ganguly, Raima Sen and Ankur Khanna in lead roles. The film is the directorial debut of Aditi Roy. The film was screened at various international film festivals and received many accolades. The story is about a son who is trying to learn about his dead mother.

== Plot ==
After his parents' divorce, Soumyo lives with his father in San Francisco. But he returns to Kolkata after 22 years when his mother, Suchismita, dies. He is the only heir to her property and is responsible for performing a few tasks. He plans to finish his work quickly and return to his life. But he starts learning about the mother he never knew, who has left many personal things for him, including her diary. He starts meeting the people who were close to his mother and discovers his mother's love and affection towards him from them. The diary helps Soumyo to finally connect with his mother.

== Cast ==
- Roopa Ganguly as Suchismita
- Raima Sen as Nandini
- Ankur Khanna as Soumyo, Suchismita's son
- Suman Mukhopadhyay as the Advocate
- Dipankar De as Suchismita's elder brother.
- Abhijit Guha as a Bihari lift-man
- Manasi Sinha as Suchismita's close friend
- Kamolika as the lawyer's wife
- Ronjini Chakraborty as Rai

== Production ==
The film is director Aditi Roy's first feature film. After graduating from Jadavpur University in Political science, Roy did post-graduate specialisation in Film Studies in 2002. She also completed a Diploma in Mass Communication. Her Diploma film was screened at the Kolkata Film Festival in 2007. Roy previously directed a few short films with the writer Neel B Mitra. The story of Abosheshey was written in 1999 by Mitra. After working together on various projects, they decided to make this script their first feature film project. The film went through 17 drafts between 2008 and 2010.

The production of the film started in November 2010. Two times National Film Award winner Ranjan Palit was opted as the director of photography. Roopa Ganguly rejected the lead role when approached for the first time, but she then accepted it after reading the script and understanding that the film would be shelved if she rejected it.

The film was shot in real locations in Kolkata and Sikkim. The scene in the Advocate's house and office was shot in the residence of a real family of lawyers. Suchismita's apartment is also actress Roopa Ganguly's own house.

== Soundtrack ==
No.	Title	Lyrics	Music	Singer(s)	Length
1.	"Dure Kothay †"	Rabindranath Tagore	Rabindranath Tagore	Roopa Ganguly	3:37
2.	"Mondo Bhaloy Dishehara"		Prabuddha Banerjee	Bonnie Chakraborty	3:48
3.	"Aji Bijan Ghare †"	Rabindranath Tagore	Rabindranath Tagore	Roopa Ganguly	3:39
4.	"Shudhu Phera Path Tuku"		Prabuddha Banerjee	Dibyendu Mukherjee	3:25
5.	"Mondo Bhaloy Dishehara"		Prabuddha Banerjee	Dibyendu Mukherjee	3:49
6.	"Abosheshey"		Prabuddha Banerjee	Roopa Ganguly	3:55
7.	"Abosheshey Theme"		Prabuddha Banerjee	–	1:36
Total length:					23:49

† – Music recreated by Prabuddha Banerjee

== Awards and recognition ==
Roopa Ganguly, who also sang two Tagore songs for the film, "Dure Kothao Dure Dure" and "Aaji Bijan Ghare", won the Best Female Playback Singer Award at the 59th National Film Awards. She was awarded with Rajat Kamal (Silver Lotus Award), a certificate and a cash prize of ₹50,000 (US$520) for "her husky and haunting voice that brings a gentle, nostalgic tone and tenor to the film Abosheshey. The languid raw sensuality of her singing is heightened by the absence of musical accompaniment."

The film was also screened at the 12th Annual New York Indian Film Festival and International Film Festival of Kerala where it won Netpac Award for Best Asian Film.
