= Dhaka International Film Festival =

Film festival held in Dhaka, Bangladesh

- Location: Dhaka, Bangladesh
- Founded: 1992; 34 years ago
- Founded by: Ahmed Muztaba Zamal
- Hosted by: Rainbow Film Society
- No. of films: 13
- Language: International
- Website: dhakafilmfestival.org

Dhaka International Film Festival (Bengali: ঢাকা আন্তর্জাতিক চলচ্চিত্র উৎসব) is a biennial film festival held in Dhaka, Bangladesh. Established in 1992, the festival was initially organized on annual basis, but became a biennial event since 1995.

DIFF is one of the most prestigious film events in Bangladesh, dedicated to introduce the mainstream global cinema to the local film makers as well as to promote healthy cine culture within Bangladesh. The festival was founded by Ahmed Muztaba Zamal of the Rainbow Film Society, which has, as of 2022, organized 20 editions of the event bringing international recognition to it.

== Awards ==
The festival authority chooses and invites Asian and Australian films to participate in different sections. The sections are:

- Retrospective
- Cinema of the World
- Women Filmmakers
- Children's Film
- Short and Independent
- Spiritual Films

The festival is devoted to feature films only. Documentary and short films may only be included in Women Filmmaker, Short and Independent, Spiritual Films and in other special sections where it is deemed fit. A five-member independent international jury board adjudicate the Asian competition section. The international jury committee select one Best Film, Best Director, Best Actor, Best Actress, Best Script and Best Cinematographer. These awards consist of a crest and certificate. The Best Film award carries a cash prize of Tk 100,000.

== Awards ceremonies ==
The following is a listing of all Dhaka International Film Awards ceremonies since 1992.

Edition	Dates	Best Film	Best Director	Notes	Sources
1st	1992				
2nd	1993				
3rd	1994				
4th	1995				
5th	1997				
6th	January 20–28, 2000	A Scam in Verse	no award		
7th	January 20–28, 2002	Future Diary: The Movie	no award	screened 100 films of 19 countries	
8th	January 15–23, 2004	Sulang Kirilli (The Wind Bird)	Anwar Jamal for Swaraaj (The Little Republic)	screened 100 films from 25 countries	
9th	January 17–25, 2006	Café Transit	Sekhar Das for Krantikaal	screened 150 films of 30 countries	
10th	January 10–18, 2008	Kargaran Mashgoul-e Karand (Men at Work)	no award	screened 31 films	
11th	January 14–22, 2010	The Other Bank	Mostofa Sarwar Farooki for Third Person Singular Number		
12th	January 12–20, 2012	no award	Sinan Çetin for Paper	screened 200 films from 55 countries	
13th	January 10–18, 2014	no award	Parviz Shahbazi for Trapped	screened 150 films from 50 countries including the first film entirely in Chakma language, Mor Thengari	
14th	January 15–23, 2016	A Few Cubic Meters of Love	Tom Waller for The Last Executioner	screened 184 films from 60 countries	
15th	January 12–20, 2017	Daughter	Parviz Shahbazi for Malaria	screened 188 films from 67 countries	
16th	January 11–21, 2018	Zer	Onur Saylak for Daha	screened 216 films from 64 countries	
17th	January 10–18, 2019	Darak yry	Pooya Badkoobeh for Dressage	screened 218 films from 72 countries	
20th	January 15-23, 2022	Pebbles	Sujit Bidari for Butterfly on the Windowpane	screened 225 films from 70 countries	
21st	January 14-22, 2023	Bi-Madar	Ali Ghavitan for Zendegi va Zendegi	screened 252 films from 71 countries	
22nd	January 20-28, 2024	The Cord of Life	Jagath Manuwarna for Rahas Kiyana Kandu	screened 252 films from 71 countries	
23rd	January 11-19, 2025	Yakshanba	Haofeng Xu and Junfeng Xu for Men Qian Bao Di (100 Yards)	screened 220 films from 75 countries	

== See also ==
- Dhaka Festival
- Cinemaking International Film Festival
- Kolkata International Film Festival
- Hyderabad Bengali Film Festival
- National Film Awards (Bangladesh)
- Meril Prothom Alo Awards
- Babisas Award
- Ifad Film Club Award
