= Bengal Film Journalists' Association – Best Supporting Actress Award =

Indian film award

Here is a list of the Bengal Film Journalists' Association Best Supporting Actress Award winners and the films for which they won.

Year	Actress	Film
2007	Indrani Halder	Faltu
2006	Roopa Ganguly	Antarmahal
2005	Satabdi Roy	Debipaksha
2004	Tabu	Abar Aranye
2003	Nandita Das	Shubho Maharat
2002	Sudipta Chakraborty	Bariwali
2001	Sohini Sengupta	Paromitar Ekdin
2000	Anusuya Majumdar
1999	Mamata Shankar
1998
1997	Aparna Sen	Abhishapta Prem
1996	Roopa Ganguly	Ujan
1995	Sreelekha Mukherji	Sudhu Asha
1994	Indrani Halder	Kancher Prithibi
1993	Mamata Shankar	Shakha Prashakha
1992	Aparna Sen	Mahaprithbi
1991
1990
1989	Debika Mukhopadhay	Choto Bou
1988	Snigdha Bandopadhay	Choto Bakulpurer Jatri
1987	Satabdi Roy	Atanka
1986	Sumitra Mukherjee	Anweshan
1985
1984
1983
1982
1981
1980
1979
1978
1977
1976	Arati Bhattacharya	Ami Se O Sakha
1975	Sumitra Mukherjee	Debichowdhurani
1974	Basabi Nandi	Bon Palashir Padabali
1973	Binota Roy & Supriya Devi	Calcutta 71 & chhinnapatra
1972	Sabitri Chatterjee	Malyadan
1971	Kaberi Bose	Aranyer Din Ratri
1970	Romi Chowdhury	Mon Niye
1969	Sandhya Roy	Tin Adhyay
1968	Subrata Chattopadhyay	Chiriakhana
1967	Sabitri Chatterjee	Kal Tumi Aleya
1966	Geeta Mukherjee	Atithi
1965	Nazima & Chhaya Devi	Arzoo (Hindi movie) & Aarohi (Bengali movie)
1964	Ruma Guha Thakurata	Palatak
1963	Anubha Gupta	Hansuli Banker Upakatha
1962	Manju Dey Nirupa Roy	CareySaheberMunsi Chhaya
1961
1960
1959
1958
1957
1956
1955
1954
1953
1952
1951
1950
1949
1948
1947
1946	Prova	Mane Na Mana
1945	Kamla Chatterjee	Shankar Parvati
1944
1943	No Award Given
1942	No Award Given

== See also ==
- Bengal Film Journalists' Association Awards
- Cinema of India
