= Sanghamitra Bandyopadhyay (actress) =

Indian film actress

- Born: 8 August 1956; Varanasi, Uttar Pradesh, India
- Died: 27 October 2016 (aged 60); Kolkata, West Bengal, India
- Occupation: Actress
- Website: sanghamitrabanerjee.com/index.html

Sanghamitra Bandyopadhyay (8 August 1956 — 27 October 2016) was an Indian actress known for her works in Bengali films. In a career spanning three and a half decades, she had acted in around 300 films. Known for her outstanding performance in negative roles, she is considered to be the most glamorous vamp in the Bengali film industry

== Early life ==
Sanghamitra was born on 8 August 1956 to Subhash Kumar Mukherjee, a noted entrepreneur and footballer, and Bulbul Mukherjee. Subhash Kumar was a pioneer in the field of perfumery. His elder brother Madhusudan Mukherjee owned renowned firms like 'The Ghosh Brothers Perfumers', 'Nirjas', 'Keshut' and 'Imuno Chemicals'.

Sanghamitra's formal education began at 'Adi Mahakali Pathsala', a distinguished school in North Kolkata founded by Mataji Gangabai. She later joined the Presidency College where she obtained her Bachelor of Arts degree with Honours in Sanskrit Literature. She earned her Master of Arts degree in Sanskrit Literature from Calcutta University. She had also obtained a Diploma in Classical Dance from Prayag Sangeet Samiti of Allahabad, a Teaching Diploma in Classical Dance from Tokyo, Japan, and a Diploma in Bengali Literature from Nikhil Banga Sahitya Parishad. She was also an accomplished classical dancer who received her training from the likes of Thankomani Kutti (Bharatnatyam), Nataraj Parimal Krishna, and Bela Arnab (Kaththak), and Ramgopal Bhattacharya (Creative Dance). In 1981, Sanghamitra represented India in South-East Asia in 1981 at a conference of classical dance organized by UNESCO.

== Career ==
While she was a student of University of Calcutta, in 1979, Sanghamitra was selected by Uttam Kumar, the legendary actor, who cast her in his last directorial venture, 'Kalankini Kankabati' which was released in August 1981. Thus, Sanghamitra was the last actress who was launched by Uttam Kumar. The song 'Bedhechi Veena Gaan Shonabo Tomaye' set to tune by Rahul Dev Burman, sung by the renowned classical singer Begum Parveen Sultana and picturized on Sanghamitra had gained immense popularity. However, she had no intention of becoming a professional actress. Dance, especially Kaththak, was her grand passion, and she dreamt of becoming an acclaimed classical dancer.

In 1981, Sanghamitra was approached by Umanath Bhattacharya to play a pivotal role in his directorial venture, Ashililatar Daye. This film went on to become a big hit. Very soon she was seen in critically acclaimed movies like Togori, Amrita Kumbher Sandhane, Parshuramer Kuthar, Atmaja to name a few. From the middle of the 1980s, she enacted negative characters in various commercially successful movies like Choto Bou, Streer Maryada, Parasmani and soon established herself as a successful vamp. Her popularity was further enhanced by her superlative performance in commercial films like Bouma, Apan Aamar Apan, Joy Porajoy, etc. In Bouma, Sanghamitra was paired opposite Ranjit Mallick. Following the success of this movie, they were cast together in many movies notable among which were Bidhilipi, Satarupa, Tumi Je Amar, Choto Bou, Chowdhury Paribar, Loafer, Sathi, Streer Maryada to name a few.

=== Later career ===
Also in the 1980s, when the small screen was gradually developing, Sanghamitra had starred in the first mega-serial in Bengali, Nivedita Research Laboratory. Her role of Julie which she enacted in Janani, one of the longest-running Bengali serials of the 1990s, had become a household name courtesy her spectacular performance. Another memorable performance of her was the role of Bhairavi in the serial Param Purush Shri Shri Ramakrishna. She also started her career on the theatrical stage with the legendary actor Anup Kumar. From the late 1980s to the middle of the 1990s, she had acted in more than fifty dramas which had won critical acclaim and commercial success. Some of her memorable dramas include Ghar Jamai, Aparajita, Swargo Narak, Mallika, Sujata, Golok-Dhanda, Samrat O Sundari, etc. She had also acted in several radio dramas telecast by All India Radio and Akashvani Kolkata. She was one of those few artists whose voice has been preserved in the Archives of All India Radio.

In the 1990s, Sanghamitra continued to capture the hearts of the audience through her performances in movies and serials alike. In the small screen, she was seen in serials like Peter Uncle, Manorama Cabin, Seemarekha, Ogo Priyotama, Asha, Katha, Nishkriti, Bordidi, Luckochuri and Tritiya Pandav. Among the notable films she acted in this decade were: Proshno, Surer Bhubone, Abhimanyu, Mahabharati, Rupoban Kanya, Kancher Prithibi, Thikana, Laho Pronam, Shesh Pratiksha, Atmaja, Anutap, Prathama, Dristhi, Karna, Tarini Tara Ma, Bohurupa, Tomar Amar Prem, Ganga, Ami Je Tomari, Amie Sei Meye, Kali Amar Ma, Lathi, Loafer, Chowdhury Paribar, Sedin Chaitra Mash, Mittir Barir Chhoto Bou, Bishnu Narayan, Kulangar, Tumi Ele Tai, etc.

On 21 April 2000, Sanghamitra met with a serious car accident due to which she suffered a lower jaw fracture. After her release from the nursing home, she was advised three months' rest. Many thought that her acting career would be over for good as she had received a serious injury on her face, but she proved everyone wrong. She resumed working within six weeks after her release from the nursing home. The first film she shot for after her recovery was Sathi, directed by Haranath Chakraborty. In the decade and a half that followed, she acted in more than a hundred films which include titles like Shasti, Pita Swarga Pita Dharma, Streer Maryada, Sharbari, Ke Apon Ke Por, Premi, Prem Korechi Besh Korechi, Shubhodrishti, Devi, Bazi, Tekka, Chakra, Shakal Sandhya, Adhikar, Ranangan, Shudhu Tomar Jonyo, Antaratamo, Dhaki, Jodi Kagoje Lekho Naam, Ekbar Bolo Bhalobashi, Ekbar Bolo Bhalobashi, Simanto Periye, Blackmail, Surya—The King, Aalo Chaya, Achena Bondhutto, etc.

Sanghamitra had also acted in many movies of Bangladesh and was quite popular in that country.

In her acting career, Sanghamitra had worked under the direction of legends like Tapan Sinha, Tarun Mazumdar, Utpal Dutta, Madhabi Mukherjee, Nabyendu Chatterjee, Dilip Roy, Dinen Gupta as well as with eminent directors of commercial movies like Anjan Choudhury, Prabhat Roy, Swapan Saha, Haranath Chakraborty, Sujit Guha, Ravi Kinagi, etc.

Three of her films, 'Love Ashram', 'Bhalobasha Khela Noye' and 'Danga' were released posthumously.

== Literary career ==
Sanghamitra Banerjee was also a poet of repute. Her poems had been published in several Bengali magazines. As a mark of recognition of her acting skills and literary contributions in Bengali literature, she was honored with the B. C. Roy Memorial Award in 2008. An anthology of her poems titled 'Alolika' was published in August 2013.

== Awards and recognition ==
- Dishari Puraskar for Choto Bou.
- Golden Disc for Choto Bou.
- Silver Disc for Choto Bou.
- Madhusudan Award for Choto Bou.
- Uttam Kumar Award for Choto Bou.
- Hemanta Mukhopadhyay Smriti Puraskar for Kothaye Amar Moner Manush.
- Shyamol Mitra Smriti Puraskar for Ei Ghor Ei Sangshar.
- Uttam Kumar Smriti Puraskar for Shudu Tomari Jonyo.
- Uttam Kumar Award for Ghor Jamai.
- Kalaratna Puraskar.
- Mahanayak Uttam Kumar Parithoshik Smriti Puraskar for Swet Pathorer Thala.
- Uttam Kumar Ratna Purakar.
- Kishore Kumar Award.
- Tarun Kumar Award for Shubhodrishti.
- Uttam Kumar Smriti Puraskar for Sokal Sandhya.
- Dishari Puraskar 1990.
- Uttam Kumar Awar for Abhimanyu.
- Art Forum Award for Tumi Je Amar.
- Art Forum Award for Ami Sei Meye.
- Art Forum Award for Rupban Kanya.
- Art Forum Award for Janani.
- Millennium Award for Sundar Bou.
- Nataraj Puraskar for Tritiya Pandav.
- Uttam Kumar Award for Aparajita.
- Uttam Kumar Award for Mitter Barir Choto Bou.
- Uttam Kumar Award for Pita Swargo Pita Dharmo.
- Rahul Dev Burman Smriti Puraskar.
- Tarun Kumar Award.
- Natun Pragati Seronama Award.
- Uttam Kumar Smriti Puraskar.
- Pramatesh Chandra Barua Award (four times).
- Dishari Puraskar for Chowdury Paribar.
- Uttam Kumar Award for Sujata.
- Anubha Gupta Smriti Puraskar.
- Chaya Devi Smriti Puraskar.
- Nandini Maliya Smriti Puraskar.
- She was felicitated at the Calcutta Press Club with the 'Manav Seva Award' for her philanthropic activities.

== Personal life ==
Sanghamitra was married to Jayanta Banerji on 27 January 1980. Her only son, Anurag Banerjee, is a writer, researcher and Founder of Overman Foundation, a leading research institute dedicated to the ideals of Sri Aurobindo and the Mother alias Mirra Alfassa.

=== Death ===
Towards the middle of 2016, it was noticed that Sanghamitra was losing weight. On 5 September, she was diagnosed with fourth-stage cancer. As she did not want the news of her illness to be conveyed to anyone, it was kept a secret from her friends and colleagues. She continued to work till 5 October. On the evening of 27 October 2016, she died at the age of sixty at her residence in South Kolkata in the presence of her family members. Following her wish of not being seeing dying and dead, the press was informed only after her last rites were performed at the crematorium.

== Filmography ==
- Achena Bondhutto (2014)
- Aalo Chhaya (2013)
- Abahelito Mukti Joddha (2013)
- Surjo - The King (2013)
- Blackmail (2013)
- Simanto Periye (2010)
- Ekbar Bolo Bhalobashi (2010)
- Lajja (2010)
- Jodi Kagoje Lekho Naam (2009)
- Bela Sheshe (2009)
- Raktanjali (2009)
- Dhakee (2009)
- Antarotamo (2008)
- Shudhu Tomar Jonyo (2007)
- Bhalobasar Dibyi (2007)
- Chakra (2007)
- Ranangan (2006)
- Sakal Sandhya (2006)
- Tekka (2006)
- Bazi (2005)
- Debi (2005)
- Shubhodristi (2005)
- Adhikar (2004)
- Prem Korechhi Besh Korechhi (2004)
- Premi (2004)
- Ke Apon Ke Par (2003)
- Sharbari (2003)
- Eri Naam Bhalobasa (2002)
- Sathi (2002)
- Shyamoli (2002)
- Streer Maryada (2002)
- Tak Misti Jiban (2002)
- Shasti (2001)
- Pita Swarga Pita Dharma (2000)
- Trishul (2000)
- Kali Aamar Maa (1999)
- Ami Je Tomari (1998)
- Ami Sei Meye (1998)
- Bishnu Narayan (1998)
- Chowdhury Paribar (1998)
- Ganga (1998)
- Tomar Aamar Prem (1998)
- Bahurupa (1997)
- Bhalobasa (1997)
- Mittir Barir Chhoto Bou (1997)
- Premsangee (1997)
- Sedin Chaitramas (1997)
- Tarini Tara Maa (1997)
- Karna (1996)
- Lathi (1996)
- Drishti (1995)
- Premsangee (1995)
- Shesh Pratiksha (1995)
- Mahabharati (1994)
- Shudhu Asha (1994)
- Tumi Je Aamar (1994)
- Aatmajo (1993)
- Kancher Prithibi (1993)
- Prathama (1993)
- Anutap (1992)
- Bahadur (1992)
- Rupaban Kanya (1992)
- Shesh Biday (1992)
- Bidhilipi (1991)
- Amrita Kumbher Sandhane(1982)
- Kalankini Kankabati
- Prashna (1991)
- Love Ashram (2016)
- Anjana (2016)
