= Target (2010 film) =

2010 film by Raja Chanda

- Target Movie Poster
- Directed by: Raja Chanda
- Written by: Manjil Banerjee
- Produced by: Gautam Kundu; Joy
- Starring: Mithun Chakraborty; Joy Kumar Mukherjee; Sayantika; Dipankar De; Santu Mukherjee; Biswajit Chakraborty; Sonali Choudhury; Neel Mukherjee
- Cinematography: Manoj Kumar Misra
- Edited by: Rabi Ranjan Maitra
- Music by: Jeet Gannguli
- Release date: 23 July 2010
- Running time: 2 hour
- Country: India
- Language: Bengali
- Budget: ₹ 4.5 million
- Box office: ₹ 5.7 million

Target: The Final Mission is a 2010 Indian Bengali-language action film directed by Raja Chanda in his directional debut, starring Joy Kumar Mukherjee and Sayantika Banerjee, and Mithun Chakraborty in a special appearance.

== Summary ==
Target: The Final Mission is the story Suvankar, an upright police officer whose daredevilry is obstructed by a Sadhu, a criminal in disguise, but Anthony, a man with a mission arrives to protect Suvankar.

== Cast ==
- Mithun Chakraborty - Advocate Anthony D'Suza, Shankar's adopted son
- Joy Kumar Mukherjee - Subhankar Sanyal, police officer
- Sayantika Banerjee - Priti Ghosh, Subhankar's love interest
- Deepankar De as Giridhari Ananda, the dreaded gangster of Sundargarh
- Santu Mukhopadhyay - Shankar Sanyal, Subhankar's father
- Biswajit Chakraborty as Police Commissioner Tanmay Nondi
- Sonali Chowdhury
- Neel Mukherjee as Rupankar Sanyal, Subhankar's elder brother
- Prasun Gain as Pappu Modak
- Shyamal Dutta as Abani Ghosh, Priti's father
- Manjil Banerjee as Munna, Constable
- Nachiketa Chakraborty as himself in the song 'Chena Shona Prithibita' (cameo)

== Music ==
Target: The Final Mission

Soundtrack album by Jeet Gannguli
- Released: 2010
- Recorded: 2009
- Genre: Feature film soundtrack
- Producer: Gautam Kundu

Jeet Gannguli chronology
Bolo Na Tumi Aamar (2010)	Target: The Final Mission (2010)	Amanush (2010)

Singles from Target: The Final Mission
- 1. "Ki Je Agun" Released: 5 Sep 2014; 2. "Jum Jum Ja" Released: 5 Sep 2014

All music is composed by Jeet Gannguli.

No.	Title	Lyrics	Singer(s)	Length
1.	"Target Title Track"
2.	"Jum Jum Ja"	Raja Chanda	Jeet Gannguli, Kalpana Patowary	3:53
3.	"Chena Shona Prithibita"		Nachiketa Chakraborty
4.	"Ki Je Agun"	Priyo Chatterjee	Kalpana Patowary	4:32
5.	"Sa Ni Pa Ni Ni"		Shreya Ghoshal, Shaan
6.	"Moula Mere Moula"		Jeet Gannguli
