= Sayantika Banerjee =

Indian actress and politician

Member of West Bengal Legislative Assembly
- In office 4 June 2024 – 4 May 2026
- Preceded by: Tapas Roy
- Succeeded by: Sajal Ghosh
- Constituency: Baranagar

State Secretary of West Bengal Trinamool Congress
- Incumbent
- Assumed office 5 June 2021
- President: Subrata Bakshi

Personal details
- Born: 12 August 1986 (age 40) Calcutta, West Bengal, India
- Party: Trinamool Congress (2021–present)
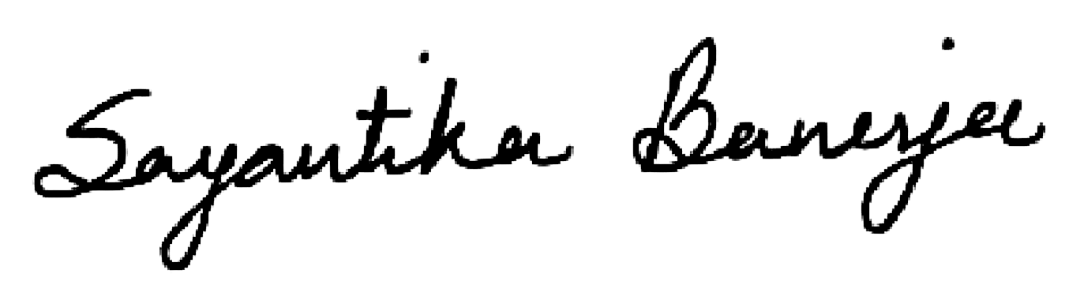
- Signature
- Other name: Sayantika
- Occupations: Actress; Politician; Social Worker
- Years active: 2009–present

Sayantika Banerjee (born 12 August 1986) is an Indian actress, model and former politician who is known for her work in Bengali cinema. She has been praised by the critics for her acting and dance skills. In 2012 she was in the Bengali film Awara, which was commercially successful.

== Career ==
=== Entertainment ===
Banerjee started her career with the dancing reality show Naach Doom Macha Ley. Then she worked in films such as Target, Hangover and Mone Pore Ajo Sei Din, which did not do well at the box office. In 2012, she acted in Awara with Jeet, which got commercial success at the box office. In 2012, she acted in another film; Shooter. In the review of the film, The Times of India wrote:

"The film totally reeks of that age-old concept which certainly doesn't work anymore. Moreover, the lack of hero-like qualities in Joy (who played the lead protagonist Dibya aka Deba), poor dialogues and ample amount of vulgarity and unnecessary violence made it worse. Sayantika as Meghna showed some potential."

=== Politics ===
Banerjee joined All India Trinamool Congress, ahead of Assembly elections 2021 in West Bengal. She contested the 2021 West Bengal Legislative Assembly election from Bankura constituency, which she lost.

She later contested the 2024 by-elections and was elected as the MLA of the Baranagar Constituency in West Bengal Legislative Assembly.

== Filmography ==
Key
Denotes films that have not yet been released

Year	Film	Role	Director	Co-Stars	Producer	Notes
2009	Ghor Sangsar	Millie	Swapan Saha	Jisshu, Anjana Basu, Arindam Ganguly, Ramen Roychowdhury, Premjit	Brand Value Communication	
2010	Target: The Final Mission	Priti	Raja Chanda	Mithun Chakraborty, Joy, Neel Mukherjee, Santu Mukherjee, Sonali Chowdhury	Brand Value Communication	
2010	Hangover	Mili Mitra	Prabhat Roy	Prosenjit, Joy, Subhra Kundu	Brand Value Communication	
2011	Paapi	IPS Jyoti	Swapan Saha	Prosenjit, Arya Babbar	Brand Value Communication	
2011	Mone Pore Aajo Shei Din	Sunaina	Ajay Singh & Sudipto Ghatak	Joy, Abhiraj	PB Films	
2012	Awara	Poulomi	Rabi Kinagi	Jeet, Mukul Dev	Shree Venkatesh Films	
2012	Shooter	Meghna	Provas & Arijit	Joy	Shristi Enterntenment	
2014	Bindaas	Kajol	Rajiv Kumar Biswas	Dev, Srabanti Chatterjee	Shree Venkatesh Films	
2015	Herogiri	Dr. Nandini	Rabi Kinagi	Dev, Mithun Chakraborty, Koel Mallick	Surinder Films	
2016	Power	Anjali	Rajiv Kumar Biswas	Jeet, Nusrat Jahan	Shree Venkatesh Films & Surinder Films	
2016	Kelor Kirti	Priya	Raja Chanda	Dev, Jisshu, Ankush, Mimi Chakraborty, Koushani Mukherjee, Nusrat Jahan	Shree Venkatesh Films & Surinder Films	
2016	Abhimaan	Srijoni	Raj Chakraborty	Jeet, Subhashree Ganguly	Reliance Entertainment, Grassroot Entertainment & Walzen Media Works	
2016	Byomkesh Pawrbo	Gulab Bai	Arindam Sil	Abir Chatterjee, Sohini Sarkar	Shree Venkatesh Films & Surinder Films	
2017	Ami Je Ke Tomar	Prachi	Rabi Kinagi	Ankush, Nusrat Jahan, Joy	SVF Entertainment	
2018	Uma	Menoka	Srijit Mukherjee	Jisshu Sengupta, Sara Sengupta	SVF Entertainment	
2018	Naqaab	Anuradha	Rajiv Kumar Biswas	Shakib Khan, Nusrat Jahan	SVF Entertainment	
2018	Bagh Bandi Khela	Deboshree	Raja Chanda, Sujit Mondal, Haranath Chakraborty	Jeet, Prosenjit, Soham Chakraborty, Srabanti Chatterjee, Rittika Sen	Surinder Films & Jalsha Movies	
2019	Shesh Theke Shuru	Madhubala	Raj Chakraborty	Jeet, Koel Mallick, Ritabhari Chakraborty	Jeetz Filmworks	Special Appearance on the song "Madhubala"
2022	Savings Account		Raja Chanda	Ankush Hazra	Shadow Films, RT Network, Soumi's	

== Television ==
Year	Show	Channel
2008	Naach Dhoom Macha ley	Rupashi Bangla
2015	Bindaas Dance	Colors Bangla
2017	Bindaas Dance Season 2	Colors Bangla

== Brand Ambassador ==
Team	Cricket League
Bengal Tigers	Celebrity Cricket League (CCL)
Midnapore Mighties	Bengal Cricket League

== Awards and nominations ==
Year	Award	Category	Film	Result
2012	Bengal Youth Awards	Best Romantic Jodi with Joy	Mone Pore Ajo Sei Din	Won
2013	Bengal Youth Awards	Popular Youth Star (Female)	Awara	Won
2018	Bengal Youth Awards	Best Actress	Ami Je Ke Tomar	Won
