= Lathi (1996 film) =

- Directed by: Prabhat Roy
- Screenplay by: Prabhat Roy
- Story by: Prabhat Roy
- Produced by: Shanti Film Corporation
- Starring: Victor Banerjee; Soumitra Chatterjee; Satabdi Roy; Abhishek Chatterjee; Pallavi Chatterjee; Prosenjit Chatterjee; Debashree Roy; Rituparna Sengupta; Deepankar De; Sabyasachi Chakrabarty; Kaushik Sen; Tota Roychowdhury; June Malia
- Cinematography: Kartik Bose, Nando Bhattacharya, Girish Padhiar
- Edited by: Swapan Guha
- Music by: Bappi Lahiri
- Release date: 20 December 1996
- Running time: 160 minutes
- Country: India
- Language: Bengali

Lathi (transl. Stick) is a 1996 Indian Bengali-language drama film written and directed by Prabhat Roy. Produced by Shanti Film Corporation, it stars Victor Banerjee as the protagonist, with an ensemble cast consisting of Soumitra Chatterjee, Prosenjit Chatterjee, Debashree Roy, Satabdi Roy, Haradhan Bandopadhyay, Abhishek Chatterjee, Pallavi Chatterjee, Rituparna Sengupta, Deepankar De, Tota Roy Chowdhury, Sabyasachi Chakrabarty and Kaushik Sen. The music of the film has been composed by Bappi Lahiri.

== Plot ==
Atindramohan Banerjee, an elderly man who has retired after a long career as a teacher at a local school, receives recognition and a farewell from the institution. While returning home, he is accompanied by his son-in-law, Somnath (Prosenjit Chatterjee), and his daughter, Lipi (Satabdi Roy). On the way, he witnesses an old woman from a lower social class being beaten and harassed by a local man who accuses her of being a kidnapper. Atindranath intervenes and saves her. At home, he faces mistreatment from his sons (Koushik Banerjee and Bodhiswatta) and their wives. Frustrated by their behavior, he decides to discipline them using a stick, believing it will help them improve their character. Meanwhile, his youngest son (Abhishek Chatterjee) secretly marries Banani (Rituparna Sengupta) without informing him. Despite this, Atindranath supports them, and the couple moves to a slum, where they start a teaching initiative. However, they soon face harassment from a local political leader. Meanwhile, his granddaughter, Sonali (June Malia), gets involved in a relationship with Tota Roy Chowdhury and becomes pregnant. In the end, with the intervention of Victor Banerjee, the political leader is dealt with, and Atindranath returns to the slum, continuing his teaching efforts. The "lathi" (stick) in the film symbolizes the old man's determination to instill discipline and improve the quality of life for those around him.

== Cast ==
- Victor Banerjee as Atindramohan Banerjee, a former headmaster of a school
- Debashree Roy as Kalyani Banerjee, Atindramohan's deceased wife
- Bodhisattwa Majumdar as Jyotin Banerjee, Atindramohan's eldest son
  - Soham Chakraborty as young Jyotin (Credited as Master Bittu)
- Debika Mitra as Jyotin's wife
- Kaushik Banerjee as Bipin Banerjee, Atindramohan's second eldest son
- Sanghamitra Bandyopadhyay as Bipin's wife
- Abhishek Chatterjee as Nabin Banerjee, Atindramohan's youngest son
- Rituparna Sengupta as Banani, Nabin's wife
- Satabdi Roy as Lipi Mukherjee, Atindramohan's daughter
- Prosenjit Chatterjee as Somnath Mukherjee, Lipi's husband
- June Malia as Sonali, Atindramohan's granddaughter
- Pushpita Mukerjee as Pinki, Atindramohan's granddaughter
- Soumitra Chatterjee as Sadananda, Atindramohan's friend (deceased)
- Nirmal Kumar as Atindramohan's friend
- Haradhan Bandopadhyay as Pranotosh, Atindramohan's friend
- Manoj Mitra as Shibshankar, Atindramohan's friend
- Tota Roy Chowdhury as Prashanta, Sonali's boyfriend
- Sabyasachi Chakraborty as Prashanta's father, an IPS officer
- Mrinal Mukherjee as Sashikanta Bhattacharya, Prashanta's grandfather, an MLA
- Arindam Sil as Swarup, Sadananda's son
- Rita Koiral as Swarup's wife
- Pallavi Chatterjee as Uma
- Saheb Bhattacharya
- Deepankar De as Bivash Dastidar
- Gita Dey as Mokshada
- Dulal Lahiri as Narayan Sen (deceased)
- Koushik Sen as Goon
- Chandan Sen
- Joy Badlani as Goon
- Partha Sarathi Deb as Doctor
- Debraj Chakraborty as Aniruddha Bhattacharya (school boy), son of Minister Sashikanta Bhattacharya

== Awards ==
Title	Year	Category	Nominee	Result	Ref.
National Film Award	1997	National Film Award for Best Film on Family Welfare	Robin Agarwal, Prabhat Roy	Won	
BFJA Award	1997	Best Actor in a Leading Role	Victor Banerjee	Won	
BFJA Award	1997	Best Art Direction	Kartik Bose	Won	
