= Mangal Deep Jwele =

1983 song by Lata Mangeshkar

Song by Lata Mangeshkar

from the album Protidan
- Language: Bengali
- English title: The auspicious lamp burns
- Released: December 23, 1983
- Length: 5:10
- Label: Saregama
- Composer: Bappi Lahiri
- Lyricist: Gauriprasanna Mazumdar
- Producer: Bappi Lahiri

Music video
- "Mangal Deep Jwele" on YouTube

Lyrical video
- "Mangal Deep Jwele" on YouTube

"Mangal Deep Jwele" (Bengali: মঙ্গল দীপ জ্বেলে) is a Bengali language song by Indian playback singer Lata Mangeshkar. The song's lyrics were written by Gauriprasanna Mazumdar and the music was composed, arranged and produced by Bappi Lahiri under the label of Saregama. The song was released on December 23, 1983 as part of the 1983 film Protidan, directed by Probhat Roy and produced by Chandrima Films.

Samarjit Guha of The Telegraph wrote about the song "If this Sharmila Tagore-Naseeruddin Shah Bengali film (Protidan) is not remembered for its content, the Lata Mangeshkar number continues to find airplay and remains a popular prayer song, which upholds the lasting legacy of Lahiri." It remains among Lahiri's most popular songs.

Music director and singer Jeet Gannguli wrote about "Mangal Deep Jwele" in an article of Anandabazar "The prayer song 'Mangal Deep Jwele Andhokhare Du Chokh Aloye Bhoro Probhu' from Prabhat Roy's film 'Pratidaan' is still used as a prayer song for many events, ceremonies and festivals."

Former chief minister of West Bengal, Mamata Banerjee went to Allen Park in Kolkata on December 21, 2023, where she inaugurated the beginning of the Christmas festival in Kolkata and gave a speech. After her speech, Banerjee beckoned politician and singer Indranil Sen to sing before the gathering before formally ending the event. Sen rendered the songs "Mangal Deep Jwele" along with "Biswapita Tumi He Prabhu". News Sangbad Pratidin reported that Sen made slight mistakes while singing the two songs, which Banerjee pointed out. Before the songs, she said "Don't sing the songs wrong this time." After Sen sang, she remarked "It is hard to sing if the mistakes have to be pointed."

== Role in Protidan ==
Probhat Roy, the director of the film took Bappi Lahiri to reach working conditions with Shakti Samanta and Pramod Chakravorty; from when Roy met Samanta at the Lovely Guest House in Santa Cruz. Later, Probhat Roy got Lahiri to compose the music of Protidan, Roy's first film as a director, when Lahiri had been working on composing music for Bollywood films. Lahiri's father Aparesh Lahiri agreed with him in getting Bappi Lahiri as the music director for the film. The lyrics of all songs in the film were written by Gauriprasanna Mazumdar. Lahiri got in touch with Lata Mangeshkar to sing the song "Mangal Deep Jwele", which was picturized on actor Sharmila Tagore. Gauriprasanna Mazumdar wrote the first four lines of the song on a cigarette packet, which began the full song lyrics. Mangeshkar refused to take her remuneration for singing the song. Lahiri recorded the prayer song twice himself picturizing on actor Naseeruddin Shah. From Protidan, Bappi Lahiri worked with Roy in more than a dozen films by directing their songs' music.

TheWall, an online newspaper in Bengali commented: "Sharmila played the role of a struggling baiji in Prabhat Roy's debut film [Protidan]. Naseeruddin Shah's only Bengali picture was 'Protidan'. Shakti Samanta was Sharmila's mentor who resided in Bombay. As Probhat Roy was an associate of Shakti Samanta, Sharmila accepted her role in the film in one go. Lata Mangeshkar's song "Mangal Deep Jwele" with lip-syncing performed by Sharmila Tagore remains one of the most popular prayer songs even today."

Pope Francis canonized Mother Teresa as a saint on September 4, 2016, 19 years after Teresa died in 1997. Screens were arranged that showed Vatican in Kolkata, with celebrations in her house there. To watch the sainthood ceremony of Terese in Vatican City, Mamata Banerjee reached Rome a few days earlier. From there, she walked on foot to Vatican accompanied by Sudip Banerjee and quizmaster Derek O'Brien. While on the way, she sang the songs "Aguner Poroshmoni" and "Mangal Deep Jwele" with others.
