= Chinna Marumagal =

- Poster
- Directed by: Prasanthkumar aka P. Chandrasekhara Reddy
- Written by: Prasanthkumar aka P. Chandrasekhara Reddy
- Produced by: Keyaar
- Starring: Sivaji Ganesan; Siva; Mohini; Delhi Ganesh
- Music by: Sriraj M S
- Production company: KR Enterprises
- Release date: 23 May 1992
- Country: India
- Language: Tamil

Chinna Marumagal (transl. Younger daughter-in-law) is a 1992 Indian Tamil-language drama film directed by Prasanthkumar (Pseudonym of Telugu Film Director P. Chandrasekhara Reddy) and produced by Keyaar. The film stars Sivaji Ganesan, Siva, Mohini and Delhi Ganesh in lead roles. It is a remake of 1988 Bengali film Chhoto Bou. The film was released on 23 May 1992.

== Cast ==
- Sivaji Ganesan
- Siva as Siva
- Mohini as Geetha
- Delhi Ganesh
- Thyagu
- Vadivukkarasi as Rajeshwari
- Renuka as Shanti
- Rajesh as Sekhar

== Soundtrack ==
The soundtrack was composed by debutant Sri Raj, with lyrics by Vaali.

Track listing
No.	Title	Singer(s)	Length
1.	"Kanmani"	K. J. Yesudas
2.	"Mangalamelangal"	Mano & P. Susheela
3.	"Manjal Vizhi"	Mano & Minmini
4.	"Appan Enna"	Malaysia Vasudevan
5.	"Hoie Hoie"	Chorus

== Reception ==
The Indian Express wrote, "Prashanth Kumar's direction is average as the narration lacks depth."
