= Bengal Film Journalists' Association – Best Foreign Director Award =

Indian film award

Here is a list of the Best Foreign Director Award given by Bengal Film Journalists' Association , India, and the films for which they won.

Year	Director	Film
1946	Billy Wilder	The Lost Weekend
1945	Leo McCarey	Going My Way

== See also ==
- Bengal Film Journalists' Association Awards
- Cinema of India
