= Prem Aamar =

- Official poster
- Directed by: Raj Chakraborty
- Written by: Selvaraghavan (Story); Abhimanyu Mukherjee (Screenplay-Dialogues)
- Produced by: Shree Venkatesh Films
- Starring: Soham Chakraborty; Payel Sarkar
- Edited by: Rabiranjan Moitra
- Music by: Jeet Gannguli
- Distributed by: Cube Digital
- Release date: 9 October 2009
- Running time: 145 min
- Country: India
- Language: Bengali
- Budget: ₹ 2.00 Crore
- Box office: ₹ 9.80 Crore

Prem Aamar is a 2009 Bengali coming-of-age romantic drama film directed by Raj Chakraborty. It stars Soham Chakraborty and Payel Sarkar, and was released on 9 October 2009. It is a remake of the Tamil-Telugu bilingual blockbuster film 7G Rainbow Colony.

== Plot ==
Rabi belongs to a lower-middle-class family and lives with his parents and his younger sister in a Railway Quarters Colony. He is seen by the others in the community as a good-for-nothing fellow as he skips classes, fails in exams, gets involved in fights, goes behind girls, and hangs out with friends most of the time. Rabi also thinks that his father hates him and often quarrels with him, even threatening to leave the house once and for all, only to be persuaded not to do so by his mother.

Rabi's life changes when a family comes into their colony below Rabi's house. Ravi finds that the family has a beautiful and educated girl, Riya, and falls for her heavenly beauty and charm, getting attracted to her gradually. Ravi tries to garner her attention but Riya has a poor opinion of him after watching his antics like creating trouble in a cinema and interrupting her performance during a colony get-together.

Riya, who gradually starts falling for Ravi, is warned about the fact that her life would be ruined if she would be with him and she is partially convinced. However, on Rabi's insistence, Riya escapes from her house, but unbeknownst to Ravi, she has been engaged to another man named Rajib. She refuses Ravi's advances saying that she doesn't love him and only came with him to a guesthouse to let him know of it. Ravi is infuriated and decides to make out with Riya and convince her, and when she refuses, he starts arguing with her and says he wants to be with her.

They continue arguing as they exit the guesthouse. Upon crossing the road, Riya is knocked down by a truck, even as a helpless Rabi watches the horrible accident right before his eyes. Rabi is also hit by a speeding vehicle while running towards the scene. The scene shifts to the hospital where everyone is mourning Riya's demise and a badly wounded Rabi tries to get a glimpse of his lady love even as he is stopped by his friend Kamdev. Rabi goes to the morgue and finds Riya's dead body.

Later, Ravi is shown trying to be unsuccessful in committing suicide, as he survives every time. His last attempt leads to chaos on a busy city road and several people beating him up. He is saved by a small group of nuns and as they try to talk to him, he sees Riya passing by. Riya takes him from those nuns and goes with Ravi walking. They settled down at a place and Riya pleads with Ravi to go on with his life so that she can be alive with his memories and love. Finally, Riya left an injured crying Ravi in the street, symbolizing Ravi's damaged mental health makes Riya alive in his memories forever.

== Cast ==
- Soham Chakraborty as Rabi
- Payel Sarkar as Riya
- Biswajit Chakraborty as Riya's father
- Laboni Sarkar as Riya's mother
- Tathoi Deb as Tuli, Rabi's sister
- Tulika Basu as Rabi's mother
- Supriyo Dutta as Rabi's father
- Parthasarathi Chakraborty as Kam, Rabi's friend
- Shweta Bhattacharya as Riya's Friend
- Suman Banerjee as Rajib, Riya's fiancé
- Prasun Gain as Amit, Rabi's friend

== Soundtrack ==
Prem Aamar

Soundtrack album by Jeet Gannguli
- Released: 2009
- Recorded: 2009
- Studio: Shree Venkatesh Films
- Genre: Feature film soundtrack
- Producer: Shree Venkatesh Films

Jeet Gannguli chronology
Keno Kichu Kotha Bolo Naa (2009)	Prem Aamar (2009)	Krodh (2009)

Singles from Prem Aamar
- 1. "Ku Ku Ru Ku" Released: 1 Sep 2009; 2. "Prem Amar Title Song" Released: 21 Jun 2014; 3. "Jage Re Jage Re" Released: 9 Feb 2016; 4. "Uru Uru Swapne Ek Rajkonye" Released: 2 Mar 2016; 5. "Bojhena Shey Bojhena" Released: 7 Mar 2016

Jeet Gannguli composed the music, and Priyo Chattopadhyay, Gautam Sushmit, and Anindya Chatterjee wrote the lyrics.

No.	Title	Artist(s)	Lyrics	length
1	"Prem Amar Title Song"	Kunal Ganjawala, June Banerjee	Priyo Chattopadhyay	4:06
2	"Bojhena Shey Bojhena"	Zubeen Garg	Gautam Sushmit	4:31
3	"Jage Re (Male)"	Nachiketa Chakraborty	Anindya Chatterjee	
4	"Ku Ku Ru Ku"	Jeet Gannguli	Priyo Chattopadhyay	4:25
5	"Uru Uru Swapne Ek Rajkonye"	Kunal Ganjawala	Gautam Sushmit	3:48
6	"Kon Bhule Tumi"	Kunal Ganjawala	Priyo Chattopadhyay	
7	"Sob Rang Muche Rakto Makhe"	Kunal Ganjawala	Priyo Chattopadhyay	
8	"Jage Re Jage Re (Female)"	Mahalaxmi Iyer	Prasen (Prasenjit Mukherjee)	4:06
