= Hangover (2010 film) =

2010 Indian Bengali film

- Theatrical release poster
- Directed by: Prabhat Roy
- Written by: Prabhat Roy
- Screenplay by: Prabhat Roy
- Story by: Prabhat Roy
- Produced by: Rose Valley Films Pvt. Ltd
- Starring: Prosenjit Chatterjee; Sayantika Banerjee; Subhasish Mukhopadhyay; Biplab Chatterjee
- Narrated by: Prosenjit Chatterjee
- Cinematography: Premendu Bikash Chaki
- Edited by: Swapan Guha
- Music by: Bappi Lahiri
- Production company: Brand Value Communication
- Distributed by: Dhoom Video
- Release date: 18 June 2010
- Running time: 135 min
- Country: India
- Language: Bengali

Hangover is a 2010 Bengali satirical comedy film directed by Prabhat Roy and produced by Rose Valley Films Pvt. Ltd under the banner of Rose Valley Films Pvt. Ltd. The film features actors Prosenjit Chatterjee and Sayantika Banerjee in the lead roles. Music of the film has been composed by Bappi Lahiri.

== Cast ==
- Prosenjit Chatterjee as Samaresh Chatterjee
- Sayantika Banerjee as Mili Mitra, Samaresh's P.A
- Joy Kumar Mukherjee as Rajib Sen
- Subhasish Mukhopadhyay as Bongshi, Samaresh's office servant
- Biplab Chatterjee as Banka Chatterjee, Samaresh's elder brother
- Supriyo Dutta as Nekde Dutta, private detective and photographer
- Subhra Kundu as Chandana Chatterjee, Samaresh's wife
- Sankalita Roy as Mitali Ghosh Dastidar

Cameo Appearances (in Joy Bangla Song)

- Ranjit Mallick as himself
- Bappi Lahiri as himself
- Biswanath Basu as himself
- Tapas Paul as himself
- Kanchan Mullick as himself
- Haranath Chakraborty as himself
- Rahul Banerjee as himself
- Shankar Chakraborty as himself
- Soham Chakraborty as himself
- Sabyasachi Chakraborty as himself
- Debdoot Ghosh as himself
- Saheb Chatterjee as himself
- Koel Mallick as herself
- Subhashree Ganguly as herself
- Indrani Dutta as herself
- Sohini Paul as herself
- June Malia as herself

== Soundtrack ==
All music was composed by Bappi Lahiri.

Hangover

Soundtrack album by Bappi Lahiri
- Released: 18 June 2010
- Producers: Bappi Lahiri; Rose Valley Films Pvt. Ltd

No	Song title	Singers
1	"Made In India"	Sunidhi Chauhan, Zubeen Garg
2	"Hangover (Title Song)"	Bappi Lahiri, Shaan
3	"Joy Bangla"	Bappi Lahiri, Shaan
4	"Hariye Jay"	Babul Supriyo, Shreya Ghoshal
5	"Macho Macho"	Shaan, Rima Lahiri
