= Chhoti Bahoo =

Chhoti Bahoo छोटी बहू
- Directed by: M. M. Baig
- Produced by: Vijay Uppal; Vijaypoli
- Starring: Deepak Tijori; Shilpa Shirodkar; Bindu; Vikas Anand; Avtar Gill; Kader Khan; Reema Lagoo; Anant Mahadevan
- Edited by: Sushir Moonis
- Music by: Nadeem-Shravan
- Production company: M. R. M. Films
- Release date: 1994
- Country: India
- Language: Hindi

Chhoti Bahoo (transl. Youngest Daughter-in-law) is a 1994 Hindi family drama directed by M. M. Baig. The film stars Deepak Tijori and Shilpa Shirodkar in lead roles. The film was a remake of Bengali film Chhoto Bou (1988).

== Cast ==
- Kader Khan as the patriarch of the family,
- Deepak Tijori as Ravi, the youngest son
- Shilpa Shirodkar as Radha, the main protagonist & Ravi's wife
- Bindu as Durga, Radha's mother-in-law
- Tiku Talsania as Deepak, Mohini's husband
- Ajit Vachani as Adarsh, the eldest son
- Reema Lagoo as Sita, Adarsh's wife
- Anant Mahadevan as Badal, the second son
- Kunickaa Sadanand as Shobha, Badal's wife
- Sushmita Mukherjee as Mohini, the only sister of the 3 brothers
- Vikas Anand as Adarsh's boss
- Avtar Gill as Radha's maternal uncle

== Soundtrack ==
All lyrics are written by Sameer; all music is composed by Nadeem-Shravan.

No.	Title	Singer(s)	Length
1.	"Ab Toh Bahaaren Bhi"	Alka Yagnik	5:08
2.	"Kha Kasam Kha Kasam"	Kumar Sanu, Alka Yagnik	5:22
3.	"Meri Baat Ko Hansi"	Kumar Sanu	5:44
4.	"O Laila Hum Tum Pe"	Kumar Sanu, Sapna Mukherjee	5:36
5.	"Sooraj Ki Pehli Kiran"	Sadhana Sargam	5:51
6.	"Tumne Humko Hasna"	Sarika Kapoor	2:08
7.	"Tumse Bichadke Lagne"	Alka Yagnik, Vinod Rathod	5:12
