= Astra (2012 film) =

- Directed by: Tathagata Bhattacherjee
- Written by: Tathagata Bhattacherjee
- Produced by: Amit Agarwal
- Starring: Joy; Samapika Debnath; Soumitra Chatterjee; Rajesh Sharma; Deepankar De; Shankar Chakraborty; Masood Akhtar; Biplab Chatterjee
- Cinematography: Rana Dasgupta
- Edited by: Amit Agarwal
- Music by: Debjit Bera
- Distributed by: Adarsh Telemedia
- Release date: 19 October 2012
- Running time: 147 min.
- Country: India
- Language: Bengali

Astra is a 2012 Bengali film produced by Amit Agarwal and directed by Tathagata Bhattacherjee. This is an action film which revolves around the love story of a gangster. In this film, DaVinci Resolve – the latest colour grading software was used for the first time in an eastern India film.

== Cast ==
- Joy as Baban
- Samapika Debnath as Koena Chatterjee
- Soumitra Chatterjee as Masoor Chacha
- Deepankar De as Biplab Dasgupta
- Shankar Chakraborty as Sambhu Da
- Biplab Chatterjee as Faiz Bhai
- Masood Akhtar as Mukhtar Bhai
- Rajesh Sharma as Inspector Sanyal
- Ashoke Viswanathan as Police Commissioner
