= Debipaksha =

- DVD cover
- Directed by: Raja Sen
- Screenplay by: Mohit Chattopadhyay; Sunetra Ghatak
- Produced by: Ashok Basu; Raja Sen; Sumanta Chowdhury
- Starring: Soumitra Chatterjee; Sandhya Roy; Satabdi Roy; Rituparna Sengupta; Koel Mallick
- Edited by: Arghyakamal Mitra
- Music by: Partha Sengupta
- Release date: 2004
- Running time: 160 minutes
- Country: India
- Language: Bengali

Debipaksha is a 2004 Bengali film directed by Raja Sen and produced by Ashok Basu, Raja Sen, and Sumanta Chowdhury. Partha Sengupta composed the music.

It tells the story of Haimanti, a lady from a pious family who is molested by a local goon. She has to face troubles to establish a new life for herself away from her family. Later, she returns home with a plot to enact her revenge on the criminal.

== Plot ==
The film revolves around the lives of a village priest, Anandamohan Bhattacharya, his wife Anima (Sandhya Roy), and their three daughters. Anandamohan is a dedicated Brahmin priest and tries to follow all the rituals and scriptures wholeheartedly. He named his three daughters Rebati, Haimanti, and Jayanti, the three names of Hindu goddess Durga.

Rebati, the eldest daughter of Anandamohan and Anima, is a widow. Her husband died in a tram accident, and she now lives with her parents. Haimanti, the couple's second daughter, is in a relation with Nikhilesh and lives in the same village. The couple's youngest daughter is Jayanti. Haimanti is sexually molested by a local criminal Ratan Samanta in front of her boyfriend Nikhilesh. Anandamohan decides not to disclose the incident to anyone and secretly sends Haimanti to his brother Sushanta's house in Mumbai. After a few days there, Sushanta also attempts to molest her. Haimanti escapes the house and by chance meets Mrs. Deshpande and Mr. Shukla, who are human rights and women's rights workers. They give Haimanti shelter.

With the assistance of Mrs. Deshpande and Mr. Shukla, and while applying her own talent, Haimanti becomes a popular actress. She returns to her village after six years to take revenge against Ratan on the eve of Mahalaya, the first day of Devipaksha (the fortnight during which the festival of Durga Puja takes place). She meets Nikhilesh and finds that he could not go back to normal life after the molestation of Haimanti, and is now a drug addict. Jayanti, Anandmohan's youngest daughter, is now a college student. Ratan learns about Haimanti's return and comes to their house to threaten her but finds that she has good acquaintance with people for whom Ratan works. Ratan is instructed over phone by his bosses not to harass the family and leave the house at once. Thus Ratan is taught a good lesson and he becomes worried. Later Ratan finds that he is losing his job and contacts because of Haimanti's influences and thus he becomes more ferocious.

On the day of Dashami (the last day of Durga Puja), Ratan loses all control and again comes to the house of Anandamohan to harass them. Haimanti tries to contact local police but fails to do so. Now, Ratan tries to molest Jayanti. Without having any other option, Haimanti takes the trident from idol of Durga's hand and kills Ratan.

== Cast ==
- Soumitra Chatterjee as Anandamohan Bhattacharya
- Sandhya Roy as Anima Bhattacharya
- Satabdi Roy as Rebati (elder daughter)
- Rituparna Sengupta as Haimanti (second daughter, protagonist)
- Koel Mallick as Jayanti (youngest daughter)
- Kaushik Sen as Nikhilesh (Haimanti's boyfriend)
- Biplab Chatterjee as Ratan Samanta

== Theme ==
The film is structured around the five days of Durga Puja depicting goddess Durga as a metaphor. The film shows triumph of good over evil. Raje Sen, the director of the film, told in an interview– "Debipaksha idolises the power within women. That power must assert itself when situation demands".

== Release ==
The film released around October 2005, during Durga Puja festival. At the same time few other Bengali films like Aabar Aashbo Phire by Rabi Ojha, Shudhu Tumi, directed by Sudeshna Roy and Abhijit Guha etc. also released in West Bengal. According to Prabhat Roy, the director of the film, because of these simultaneous releases, they were under "tremendous pressure".

== Awards ==
Year	Award	Category	Recipient	Result	Ref.
2005	BFJA	Best Actor in a Supporting Role	Biplab Chattopadhyay	Won	
2005	BFJA	Best Actress in a Supporting Role	Satabdi Roy	Won	
