= Soham Chakraborty =

Indian actor, producer, politician (born 1984)

- Chakraborty in 2018

Member of the West Bengal Legislative Assembly
- In office 2 May 2021 – 4 May 2026
- Preceded by: Amiya Kanti Bhattacharjee
- Succeeded by: Pijush Kanti Das
- Constituency: Chandipur, Purba Medinipur

Personal details
- Born: 4 March 1984 (age 42) Kolkata, West Bengal, India
- Party: Trinamool Congress (2014–present)
- Spouse: Tanaya Chakraborty (m. 2012)
- Children: 2
- Parent(s): Subrata Chakraborty, Deepa Chakraborty
- Occupation: Actor; Singer; Politician; Television producer

Soham Chakraborty (born 4 March 1984) is an Indian actor, producer, television personality and politician. He has appeared in more than 100 Bengali films, as child artist (Master Bittu) and as male lead. He has received numerous accolades, including the Mahanayak Samman, BFJA Awards, Tele Cine Awards, Star Jalsha Entertainment Awards and others. He is a member of Trinamool Congress. He contested 2016 West Bengal Legislative Assembly election from Borjora Constituency. He won the 2021 West Bengal Legislative Assembly election from Chandipur constituency by a margin of 14000 votes.

== Acting career ==
Soham Chakraborty made his Tollywood debut in 1988 as a child artist with the popular Bengali film Choto Bou. Early in his career, Chakraborty was recognised as Master Bittu and featured in several films as a child artist including Mangaldeep in 1989, Nayan Moni in 1989, Jowar Bhata in 1990, Satyajit Ray directed Shakha Proshakha in 1990, Bhagya Debata in 1997, starring Mithun Chakraborty and several other noted films. He was awarded Uttam Kumar Awards twice as Child Artist of the year for his performance in Jowar Bhata (1991) and Shakha Proshakha (1990). He has appeared in several television series and has played supporting roles in films in the late 1990s and early 2000s. After completing his higher education in the field of B.Com. (Hons.), he appeared in Chander Bari, directed by Tarun Majumdar (2007). Chakraborty, has described the difficult phase and struggling days in his acting career to appear in the big budget films. He was then launched with the film Bajimaat (2008), as male lead. He then rose to prominence after starring in 2009 film Prem Aamar directed by Raj Chakraborty and produced by Shree Venkatesh Films, which turned out a blockbuster and recorded highest grosser in Bengali film's history. After Prem Aamar his previously shot films Rahasya, Jeena, and Soldier were released and were commercially average. His other blockbuster film Amanush was released in 2010. The film was directed by Rajib Biswas. Chakraborty played the role of Vinod, an orphan who has suffered a lot of physical and mental torture in his childhood. He went on to films such as Faande Poriya Boga Kaande Re (2011), Jibon Rong Berong (2011), Le Halua Le (2012), Jaaneman (2012), Bojhena Shey Bojhena (2012), Loveria (2013), Bangali Babu English Mem (2014), Amanush 2 (2015) and Black. The series of comedies and family dramas that followed, earned Chakraborty widespread adulation from audiences, particularly among teenagers. Such films are Jamai 420 ( 2015), Katmundu (2015), Jio Pagla (2017) and Honeymoon (2018), Jamai Badal (2019) and Thai Curry (2019). His other blockbuster film Shudhu Tomari Jonyo ( 2015), along with Dev, remains a highest-grosser and has been screened in Mumbai and New Delhi. In 2015, Chakraborty was appointed the Vice President of All India Trinamool Youth Congress. Acting career inspired by Tapas Paul.

== Television ==
Soham also anchored a reality show Twinkle Twinkle Dancing Star launched by makers of Chirodini...Tumi Je Amar, Prem Amar, Challenge and Amanush. He was also the host of Parar Sera Bouthan, replacing Aneek Dhar, which aired on ETV Bangla. The show was then hosted by Aparajita Adhya. Soham has also appeared as a guest on television serial Bojhena Se Bojhena. Chakraborty, in 2019-20 along with Mithun Chakraborty and Srabanti Chatterjee judged the dance reality show Dance Dance Junior by Star Jalsha.

== Politics ==
Chakraborty joined All India Trinamool Congress in 2014. Chakraborty was appointed the All India Trinamool Youth Congress state vice president. Chakraborty contested 2016 West Bengal Legislative Assembly election from Barjora (Vidhan Sabha constituency). Chakraborty was defeated by Sujit Chakraborty of CPI-M by a margin of 616 votes.

== Filmography ==
†	Denotes films that have not yet been released

Year	Film	Role	Note
2026	Shey Toh Aajo Bojhe Na	Moinak	
2025	Bahurup	Abhimanyu	
2025	Felubakshi	Felubakshi	
2024	Shastri	Saikat Majumdar	Also co-producer
2023	Pradhan	Bibek	
2023	Nikhonj – The Search Begins		Zee5 Release
2023	Angshuman MBA	Angshuman	Zee5 Release
2023	LSD: Laal Suitcase Ta Dekhechen?		
2023	Jai Kali Kalkattawali	Anish	Zee5 Release
2022	Hirokgorer Hire		Zee5 Release
2022	Boudi Canteen	Bablu	
2022	Haar Mana Haar		Zee5 Release
2022	Paka Dekha	Joydeep	
2022	Dharmajuddha	Jabbar	
2022	Shrimati		
2022	Haluaman		
2022	Kolkatar Harry		
2021	Lockdown		
2021	Pratighath		Zee5 Release
2021	Ei Ami Renu	Baren	
2021	Miss Call	Krishna	
2020	Harano Prapti	Mainak	Zee5 Release
2020	Hullor		
2019	Sotoroi September	Neel	
2019	Bhootchakra Pvt. Ltd.	Amit	
2019	Googly		
2019	Thai Curry	Ayan	
2019	Jamai Badal	Krish	
2018	Ami Sudhu Tor Holam	Chiranjib	
2018	Bagh Bandi Khela	Hirok	
2018	Tui Sudhu Amar	Aditya	Indo- Bangladesh joint production
2018	Piya Re	Ravi	
2018	Rongberonger Korhi	Ramchandra Murmu	
2018	Honeymoon	Gitin	
2017	Jio Pagla	Raj Shankar Dhol / Gouri	
2017	Dekh Kemon Lage	Rahul Roy	
2017	Amar Aponjon	Joydip Mukherjee	
2016	Gangster	Vishnu	Extended cameo appearance
2015	Black	Bullet / Biltu	
2015	Shudhu Tomari Jonyo	Siraz Chowdhury	
2015	Katmundu	Sunny	
2015	Jamai 420	Shaan	
2015	Amanush 2	Md.Salim / Raghu / Ashok	
2014	Golpo Holeo Shotti	Rudra	
2014	Bangali Babu English Mem	Madhushudan / Madhu / Honey	
2013	Loveria	Aditya	
2012	Bojhena Shey Bojhena	Noor Islam	
2012	Jaaneman	Debaditrya / Deva	
2012	Le Halua Le	Rahul	
2011	Jibon Rong Berong		
2011	Faande Poriya Boga Kaande Re	Raju	
2010	Atanka		Cameo Appearance
2010	Kichu Chaoa Kichu Pawa		
2010	Hangover		Special Appearance
2010	Amanush	Vinod	
2010	Soldier		
2010	Jeena The Endless Love		
2010	Rahasya The Bhoutik		
2009	Prem Aamar	Rabi	
2008	Bajimaat	Shuvro	
2007	Chander Bari		Debut as Hero
2006	Swapno	Young Ajoy	Teenage artist
2001	Ek Tukro Chand	Shontu	Teenage artist
1998	Chowdhury Poribar		Teenage artist
1997	Matir Manush		Teenage artist
1997	Mayar Badhon	Koushal	Teenage artist
1997	Bakul Priya	Young Bakul	Teenage artist
1996	Lathi	Young Jyotin	Teenage artist
1996	Bhai Amar Bhai	Young Amar	Teenage artist
1994	Biswas Abiswas		Teenage artist
1992	Surer Bhubone		Child artist
1990	Shakha Proshakha	Dipayan "Dingo" Majumdar	Child artist
1990	Debota		Child artist
1989	Mangaldeep		Child artist
1988	Chhoto Bou	Raju	Child artist

== Web series ==
Year	Title	OTT	Character	Co-Artist	Notes	Ref.
2021	Dujone	Hoichoi	Amar	Srabanti Chatterjee		
2024	Kaantaye Kaantaye	ZEE5		Saswata Chatterjee		

== Accolades ==
In 2022 Chakraborty was awarded Mahanayak by the chief minister of West Bengal Mamata Banerjee.

Year	Award	Category	Film	Result
2010	Star Jalsha Entertainment Awards	Best Actor	Prem Amar	Won
2011	Star Jalsha Entertainment Awards	Best Actor	Amanush	Won
2011	Tele Cine Awards	Best Actor	Amanush	Won
2011	Zee Bangla Gourab Somman Awards	Best Actor	Amanush	Nominated
