= Prasun Gain =

Bengali actor

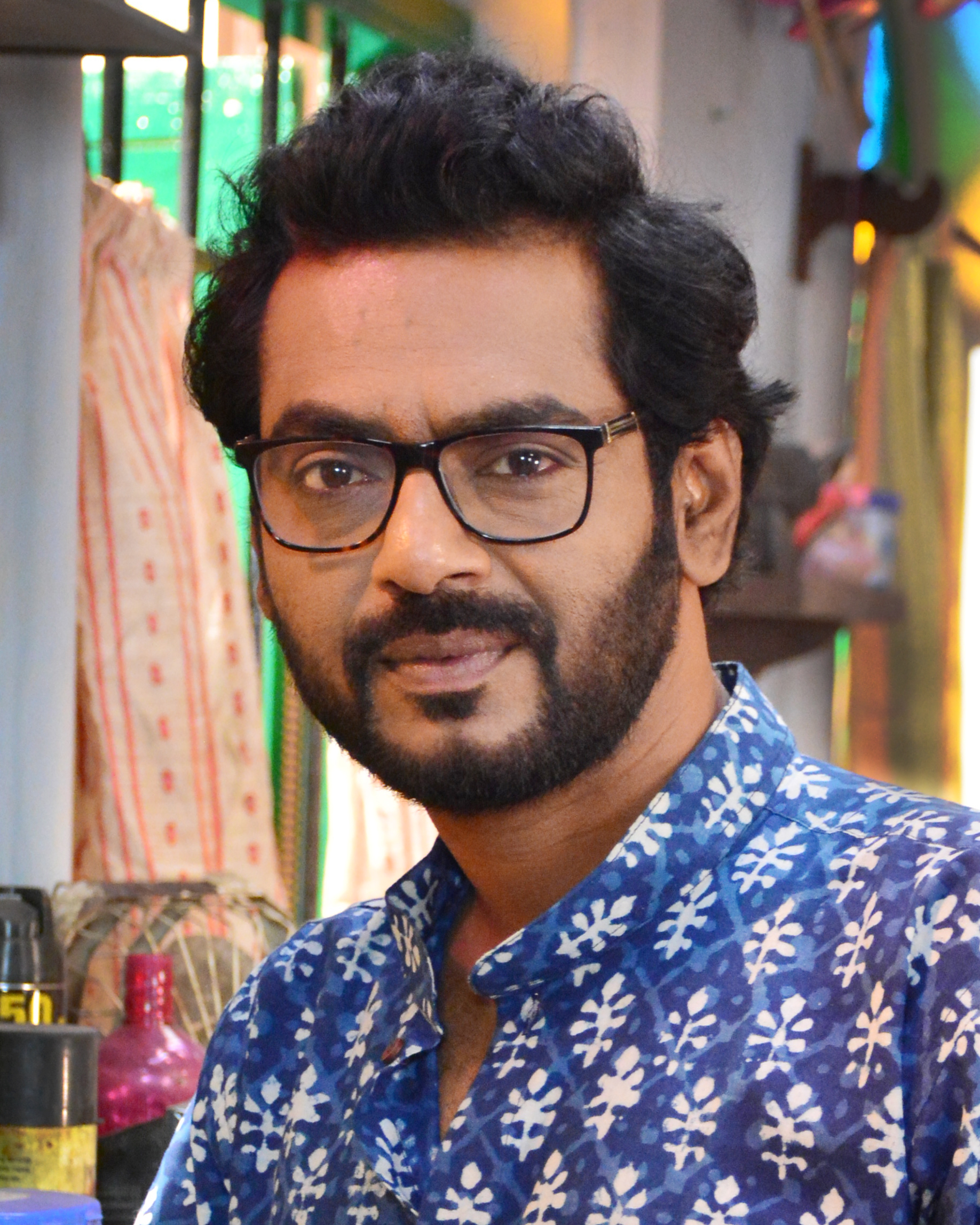
- Born: 3 September 1977 (age 49); Kolkata, West Bengal, India
- Occupation: Actor

Prasun Gain (born 3 September 1977) is an Indian actor and dramatist who works in Bengali cinema and television. He is best known for his roles in Detective Byomkesh Bakshy! (2015), Alifa (2016), and Prem Amar (2009). He also played the character based on Tillius Cimber in the Bengali adaptation of William Shakespeare's Julius Caesar, Zulfiqar (2016). On television, he plays the role of Prafulla Roy in Byomkesh. Prasun Gain is currently releasing his short films on his YouTube channel.

== Filmography ==
Year	Film	Character
2008	10:10	Subhrajit
2009	Challenge	Kartik's Team Member
2009	Prem Amar	Arnab Bandyopadhyay
2010	Shedin Dekha Hoyechilo	Pranab
2010	Amanush (2010 film)	
2013	Dekha, Na-Dekhay	Harish
2013	Khasi Katha– A Goat Saga	Parvez
2013	Target Kolkata	Karthik
2013	Misti Cheler Dustu Buddhi	Abir Ghosh
2013	Kanamachi	Saikat Chakraborty
2015	Detective Byomkesh Bakshy!	Amartya Dasgupta (Journalist)
2016	Alifa	Rekib
2016	Zulfiqar	Mithilesh Sikdar (Tillius Cimber)
2017	Comrade	
2024	Surjo	
2026	Shab Khabor Bisesh Noi : This is not breaking News	

== Television ==
- Byomkesh
- Neem Phooler Madhu
- Bullet Sorojini
