= Lakshyabhed =

- Poster
- Directed by: Raj Mukherjee
- Produced by: D.M Productions
- Starring: Joy; Swastika; Tapas Paul; Rachana, Sabyasachi; Monoj Mitra; Kharaj Mukherjee; Locket; Pulokita; Neel; Kanchan Mullick; Monu Mukherjee
- Cinematography: Bakul Roy
- Music by: Kalyan Sen Barat
- Release date: 23 January 2009
- Running time: 120 minutes
- Country: India
- Language: Bengali

Lakshyabhed (The Target) is a 2009 Bengali film directed by Raj Mukherjee. The film stars Joy, Swastika Mukherjee, Rachana Banerjee, Tapas Paul, Sabyasachi, Monoj Mitra, Kharaj Mukherjee, Locket, Pulokita, Neel, Kanchan Mullick, and Monu Mukherjee. It was shot at Pattaya in Thailand, a first for a Bengali film. An 18-member team camped in Pattaya to shoot the sun and sand. and Eden Gardens, Kolkata.

== Plot ==
The film is about Rupak Chowdhury and his intellectually disabled brother Joy along with their step brother Rohit and sister Rinki. They live with their step uncle Ahi mama and his wife, who conspire against them. Joy was given poisonous medicines since his childhood by Ahimama and his Dr. friend which has damaged his nervous system. Nobody loves Joy apart from Rupak and their servant Harikaka. For a change Rupak takes Joy to their village where they meet two sisters Mukul and Bakul. Incidentally Rupak marries Mukul but when they return home, the bad guys refuse to accept her as Rupak's wife and continuously blame her for their sudden misfortune. Mukul leaves home with Joy to cure him. After consulting a doctor she sends Joy to "Ananda Ashram" under the supervision of Maharaj. On the other hand, Ahimama sends his friend's daughter Kitty to woo Rohit but when Kitty discovers their conspiracy they kill her. Slowly Rinki and Rohit understand that they are being misguided by their uncle and aunt, but it is too late. Ahimama kidnaps Rupak and Mukul- Bakul's parents and kills Harikaka. So Mukkul Bakul and Joy come to rescue Rupak, fight bravely but Rupak and Rohit both die while fighting. Joy kills his Ahimama, takes his revenge, goes to jail, writes his autobiography "Lakshyabhed" in jail and then is released from jail to live happily ever after with his family.

== Cast ==
- Joy Kumar Mukherjee as Joy Chowdhury
- Swastika Mukherjee as Bokul
- Rachana Banerjee as Mukul
- Tapas Paul as Rupak Chowdhury, owner of Chowdhury Constructions, Mukul's Husband
- Sabyasachi Chakraborty as Monohar Maharaj, owner of Ananda Ashram
- Manoj Mitra as Ahinokul
- Kharaj Mukherjee as Harihar
- Locket Chatterjee as Ketaki Bose aka Kitty
- Arun Chakrabartty as Dr. Jayanta Bose, Kitty's father
- Arghya Mukherjee as Ronit Roy
- Pulokita Ghosh as Rinky
- Neel Mukherjee as Rohit Chowdhury
- Kanchan Mullick as Ganesh Gupta
- Monu Mukhopadhyay as Mahim babu
- Ruma Dasgupta as Mahim's wife, Mukul & Bokul's mother

== Crew ==
- Story: Sabyasachi
- Directed by: Raj Mukherjee
- Music: Kalyan Sen Barat
- Produced by: D.M Productions
- Executive Producers: Sujay Mukherjee, Sikha Mukherjee
- Art Director: Samir Kumdu
- Cinematography: Bakul Roy
- Screenplay: Sadhan Pal
