= Mone Pore Aajo Shei Din =

- Film Poster
- Directed by: Ajay Singh, Sudipto Ghatak
- Written by: Ajay Singh, Sudipto Ghatak
- Produced by: Pankaj Agarwal
- Starring: Sayantika Banerjee; Joy Kumar Mukherjee
- Cinematography: Kumud Verma
- Music by: Indradeep Dasgupta; Dev Sen; Debojit
- Production company: PB Films
- Distributed by: Brand Value Communications, PB Films
- Release date: 9 December 2011
- Country: India
- Language: Bengali

Mone Pore Aajo Shei Din (Bengali: মনে পড়ে আজও সেই দিন; English: I remember that day) is a Bengali language romantic drama film directed by Ajay Singh and Sudipto Ghatak. The family entertainer is a love story with a twist. The title of the movie is based on its musical drama content. The soundtrack of the film was composed by Indradeep Dasgupta, with one song by Dev Sen. The film stars Joy Kumar Mukherjee, and Sayantika Banerjee in the lead roles.

== Cast ==
- Joy Kumar Mukherjee as Rahul
- Sayantika Banerjee as Sunaina
- Biswajit Chakraborty
- Moumita Gupta
- Mousumi Saha

== Soundtrack album ==
The music was composed by Indradeep Dasgupta, Dev Sen and Debojit. The album contains five songs.

All lyrics are written by Prosen.

No.	Title	Lyrics	Music	Artist(s)	Length
1.	"Mera Man O Janeman"	Prosen	Dev Sen	Prosenjit Mallick, Anwesha Dutta Gupta	4:33
2.	"Megha Re"	Prosen	Indradeep Dasgupta	Anwesha Dutta Gupta	4.51
3.	"Nach Nach O Mahi(Duet)"	Prosen	Indradeep Dasgupta	Prosenjit Mallick, Anwesha Dutta Gupta	4.31
4.	"Mone Pore Aajo Shei Din"	Prosen	Indradeep Dasgupta	Madhura Bhattacharya	4.49
5.	"Hay Ram Hore Hore"	Prosen	Dev Sen	Sujoy Bhowmik, Moinak Sinha	4.12
6.	"Hayre Bhanga Mon"	Prosen	Debojit	Anwesha Dutta Gupta	3.44
