= Protidan =

- Directed by: Prabhat Roy
- Starring: See below
- Music by: Bappi Lahiri
- Release date: 23 December 1983
- Running time: 145 minutes
- Country: India
- Language: Bengali

Protidan is a 1983 Bengali action drama film directed by Prabhat Roy with Victor Banerjee, Naseeruddin Shah, Sharmila Tagore, Lily Chakravarty and Ranjit Mallick in lead roles. The film gave popularity for the song "Mangal Deep Jwele".

== Plot ==
The film is about the love story of Gauri and Samir. Samir is a wealthy man and Gauri hails from a village.

== Cast ==
- Victor Banerjee
- Naseeruddin Shah
- Sharmila Tagore
- Lily Chakraborty
- Ranjit Mallick

== Soundtrack ==
All songs were written by Gauriprasanna Mazumdar and composed by Bappi Lahiri. The song "Mangal Deep Jwele" became a hit prayer song.

No.	Title	Singer	Length
1.	"Tomra Paisa Diye"	Asha Bhosle	4:09
2.	"Mangal Deep Jwele, Pt. 1"	Lata Mangeshkar	5:09
3.	"Ami Phuldanite Sajiye Rakha"	Asha Bhosle	3:39
4.	"Jano Naki Tumi"	Asha Bhosle, Bappi Lahiri	4:51
5.	"Mangal Deep Jwele, Pt. 2"	Bappi Lahiri	2:59
6.	"Mangal Deep Jwele, Pt. 3"	Bappi Lahiri	4:43
7.	"Ho Re Re Re"	Kishore Kumar	4:51
Total length:			30:23
