= Naya Zaher =

- Theatrical poster of the film
- Directed by: Jyoti Sarup
- Written by: Sudeep
- Produced by: Praveen Thakar
- Starring: Shatabdi Roy; Navin Nischol; Uttam Mohanty; Disco Shanti
- Music by: Kalyanji Anandji
- Production company: Durgaa Pictures
- Release date: 19 April 1991
- Running time: 136 minutes
- Country: India
- Language: Hindi

Naya Zaher is a 1991 Hindi drama thriller movie of Bollywood directed by Jyoti Sarup. It was India's first Hindi feature film based on HIV/AIDS. The mode has given of an adult thriller, where the main villain in the film is not a person, but the disease, AIDS. The music of the film was composed by Kalyanji–Anandji.

== Plot ==
Rashmi, a young woman, is assaulted by a masked man and later diagnosed with AIDS. Shamed and isolated after being ordered into quarantine by the authorities, she takes her own life in despair. Meanwhile, Police Commissioner and his daughter Richa visit a remote village, where they meet Avinash, a local villager. Avinash becomes infatuated with Richa and follows her to the city, determined to pursue a relationship. In an attempt to build his confidence in sexual matters, Avinash seeks out a group of women associated with Devyani's gang, engaging in casual encounters.

After reuniting with Richa, Avinash suddenly experiences throat pain. A doctor diagnoses him with AIDS, leaving him devastated. Fearing quarantine, Avinash imprisons the doctor to prevent the news from spreading.

Consumed by anger, Avinash embarks on a violent revenge spree, targeting the women he believes infected him. He confronts Mrs. Dayal, a woman desperate for a child due to her husband's infertility. Upon learning she is pregnant, Avinash spares her. However, Mrs. Dayal is later killed by Devyani, but her baby survives.

His quest for vengeance ultimately leads him to Devyani Kamath, the leader of the gang. In a final confrontation, Avinash assaults her, but shortly afterward, she is killed in a bomb explosion.

In his dying moments, Avinash expresses his final wish to Richa, asking her to protect their unborn child from him and entrusting the child's future to her care.

The film has been criticized for its controversial themes, including the protagonist's justification for infecting his victims. It has also faced backlash for its portrayal of gender, morality, and racial stereotypes.

== Cast ==
- Navin Nischol as Police Commissioner
- Satabdi Roy as Richa
- Arjun (Firoz Khan) as Inspector Vikram
- Uttam Mohanty as Avinash
- Shiva Rindani
- Disco Shanti
- Iqbal Durrani
- Alka Kubal

== Soundtrack ==
The music was composed by Kalyanji–Anandji and released by Sonotone. Lyrics were penned by Indeevar, Maya Govind, Shail Chaturvedi and Vinoo Mahendra.

Naya Zaher

Soundtrack album by Kalyanji–Anandji
- Released: 1991
- Recorded: 1991
- Genre: Soundtrack
- Label: Sonotone
- Producer: Kalyanji–Anandji

Kalyanji–Anandji chronology
Irada (1991)	Naya Zaher (1991)	Kaun Kare Kurbanie (1991)

Track list
No.	Title	Singer(s)	Length
1.	"Dilbar Mere Tere Vaaste"	Mohammed Aziz, Sadhana Sargam	5:44
2.	"One One De De Chance"	Kumar Sanu
3.	"Kabhi Kabhi Jeevan Mein"	Sadhana Sargam
4.	"Nazar Nazar"	Sadhana Sargam, Sonali Bajpayee
5.	"Jane Jigar Dekh Idhar"	Sudesh Bhosale, Hema Sardesai, Sonali Bajpayee, Sapna Mukherjee, Shikha Sen
6.	"Kabhi Gyarah Baje"	Sapna Mukherjee, Sudesh Bhosle
7.	"Dilbar Mere (Instrumental)"	Instrumental
