= Amrita Kumbher Sandhane =

- Film poster
- Story by: Samaresh Basu (Kalkut)
- Starring: Subhendu Chatterjee; Aparna Sen; Bhanu Bandopadhyay; Samit Bhanja; Ruma Guha Thakurta
- Music by: Sudhin Dasgupta
- Release date: 1982
- Country: India
- Language: Bengali

Amrita Kumbher Sandhane ( Bengali: অমৃত কুম্ভের সন্ধানে, Quest for the Amrita Kumbha) is a 1982 Bengali film directed by Dilip Roy. It is based on a story by "Kalkut", pseudonym of Samaresh Basu (1924–1988). Music is by Sudhin Dasgupta and stars Shubhendu Chatterjee, Aparna Sen, Bhanu Bandhopadhyay, Samit Bhanja, Ruma Guha Thakurta amongst others.

The film documents one of the largest Indian religious fairs, the Prayag Kumbh Mela, which is held once every 12 years at the confluence of the rivers Ganges, Yamuna and Saraswati. The action is seen through the eyes of Shubhendu Chatterjee who has come to the Mela not out of any religious sentiment but to see and understand people and seek the reason why “….multitudes upon multitudes of the old and weak and the young and frail enter without hesitation or complaint upon such incredible journeys and endure the resultant miseries without repining". (Mark Twain after visiting the 1895 Mela)

== Cast ==
- Subhendu Chatterjee
- Aparna Sen
- Bhanu Bandopadhyay
- Samit Bhanja
- Ruma Guha Thakurta
- Mahua Roychoudhury
- Anup Kumar
- Sanghamitra Bandyopadhyay

== Soundtrack ==
- "Raam Jopo Raam Jopo" - Sujata Sarkar
- "Allah Twala Tu Hi" - Shakti Thakur
- "Purob Jaiba Piyaba" - Ruma Guha Thakurta
- "Ke Tumi Pagolpara He" - Amar Paul
- "Amar Bodhu Geche" - Arunadhati Holme Chowdhury
- "Sadher Khancha Pore Robe" - Amar Paul
