= Bengal Film Journalists' Association – Best Foreign Actor Award =

Indian film award

Here is a list of the recipients of the Best Foreign Actor Award given by Bengal Film Journalists' Association, India, and the films for which they won.

Year	Actor	Film
1946	Cary Grant	Arsenic and Old Lace
1945	Robert Walker	Since You Went Away

== See also ==
- Bengal Film Journalists' Association Awards
- Cinema of India
