= Joy Kumar Mukherjee =

Indian film and television actor

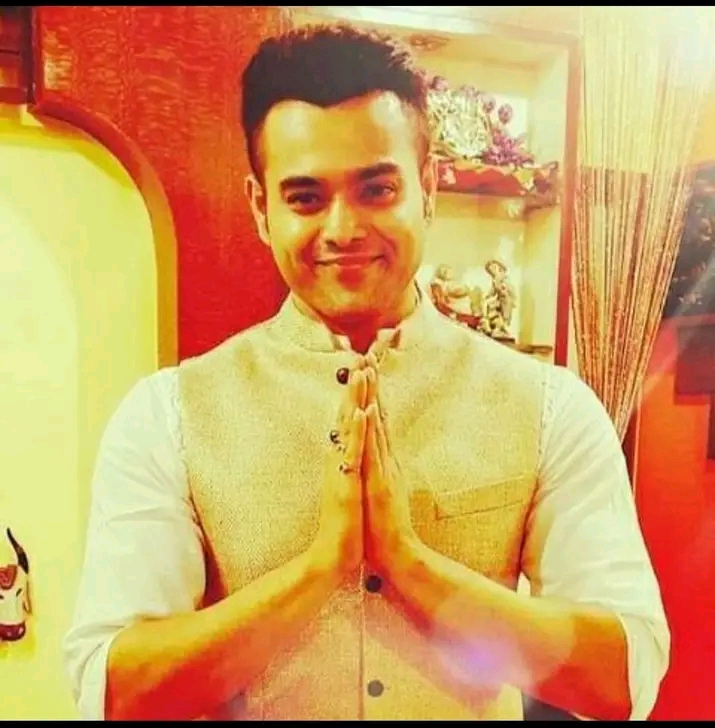
- Born: Sanjay Mukherjee; 21 June 1987 (age 39); Hooghly, West Bengal, India
- Occupations: Actor, Businessman
- Years active: 2009–present
- Parent: Dhananjay Mukherjee (father)

Joy Kumar Mukherjee is an Indian Bengali film and television actor. In 2010, he acted in Target: The Final Mission and received Anandalok "Best Debutant" and "Best action hero" award. In 2011, he acted in Mone Pore Aajo Shei Din with Sayantika Banerjee. His 2012 film Astra was the most commercially successful movie in his career, following the success of Target in 2010. He appeared in the television series Chokher Tara Tui on Star Jalsha.

In 2019, Joy appeared on the Bengali television channel Sun Bangla in Jiyon Kathi, followed by another comeback in 2022 on Star Jalsha in Bikram betal.

== Filmography ==
=== Film ===
| Year | Films | Role | Director |
|---|---|---|---|
| 2009 | Lakshyabhed | Joy | Raja Mukherjee |
| 2009 | Tinmurti | Raja Sen | |
| 2010 | Hangover | Rajeev | Prabhat Roy |
| 2010 | Lajja | | Dayal Acharya |
| 2010 | Target: The Final Mission | Shubhankar/Suvo | Raja Chanda |
| 2011 | Warrant | Rahul | Swarup Ghosh |
| 2011 | Mone Pore Aajo Shei Din | Rahul | Ajay Singh & Sudipto Ghatak |
| 2012 | Shooter | Dibya | Provas & Arijit |
| 2012 | Astra | Baban | Tathagata Bhattacharjee |
| 2012 | Bawali Unlimited | Santo | Sujit Mondal |
| 2017 | Ami Je Ke Tomar | Akaash | Rabi Kinagi |

== Television ==
| Year | Serial | Network(s) | Role |
|---|---|---|---|
| 2014 –2016 | Chokher Tara Tui | Star Jalsha | Ayush Kumar Chatterjee |
| 2019 –2022 | Mahapeeth Tarapeeth | Star Jalsha | Raja Ramjiban Moitra |
| 2019 –2020 | Jiyon Kathi | Sun Bangla | Rishi Banerjee (later replaced by Somraj Maity) |
| 2022 | Vikram Betal | Star Jalsha | Vikram |

== Awards and nominations ==
| Year | Award | Category | Film/Serial | Result |
|---|---|---|---|---|
| 2010 | Anandalok Awards | Best Debutant Actor (Male) | Target | Won |
| 2012 | Bengal Youth Awards | Best Romantic Jodi with Sayantika Banerjee | Mone Pore Ajo Sei Din | Won |
| 2015 | Star Jalsha Parivar Awards | Best Debutant Actor (Male) | Chokher Tara Tui | Won |
| 2015 | Star Jalsha Parivar Awards | Best Actor of the Year (Male) | Chokher Tara Tui | Won |
