= Kolkatar Harry =

2022 Indian Bengali-language film by Rajdeep Ghosh

- Theatrical release poster
- Directed by: Rajdeep Ghosh
- Written by: Rohit Dey; Soumya Nandy
- Produced by: Soham Chakraborty
- Starring: Soham Chakraborty; Priyanka Sarkar
- Cinematography: Gopi Bhagat
- Edited by: Subhajit Singha
- Music by: Jeet Gannguli
- Production company: Soham's Entertainment
- Distributed by: ZEE5
- Release date: 6 May 2022
- Running time: 132 minutes
- Country: India
- Language: Bengali

Kolkatar Harry is a 2022 Indian Bengali-language comedy children film directed by Rajdeep Ghosh and produced by Soham Chakraborty under the banner of Soham's Entertainment. The film stars Chakraborty and Priyanka Sarkar.

== Cast ==
- Soham Chakraborty
- Priyanka Sarkar
- Prosenjit Chatterjee
- Raj Chakraborty
- Laboni Sarkar
- Sudipa Basu
- Oishika Guhathakurata
- Arindam Ganguly
- Anirban Sikdar

== Soundtrack ==
Kolkatar Harry

Soundtrack album by Jeet Gannguli
- Released: 18 April 2022
- Recorded: 2021
- Studio: Playhead Studio
- Genre: Film soundtrack
- Length: 15:46
- Language: Bengali
- Label: Zee Music Bangla

Official audio
- Kolkatar Harry - Full Album on YouTube

The music of the film is composed by Jeet Ganguly with lyrics written by Rohit Soumya.

Track listing
No.	Title	Singer(s)	Length
1.	"Ei Amader Captain Magic Jane"	Soham Chakraborty and Chorus	2:56
2.	"Hotat Mone Bristi"	Jeet Gannguli	2:45
3.	"Tara Khosa Raat"	Nikhita Gandhi	4:33
4.	"Phire Takao"	Usha Uthup	2:05
5.	"Sohore Ache Ekta Buro"	Rupankar Bagchi	3:40
Total length:			15:46
