= Bengal Film Journalists' Association – Best Foreign Actress Award =

Indian film award

Here is a list of the recipients of the Best Foreign Actress Award given by Bengal Film Journalists' Association, India, and the films for which they won.

Year	Actress	Film
1946	Ingrid Bergman	Gaslight
1945	Jennifer Jones	The Song of Bernadette

== See also ==
- Bengal Film Journalists' Association Awards
- Cinema of India
