= Arjit =

Arjit is a given name. Notable people with the name include:

- Arjit Gupta (born 1989) Indian cricketer
- Arjit Taneja (born 1992) Indian actor

== See also ==
- Arijit
