= Bengal Film Journalists' Association – Best Foreign Film Award =

Indian film award

Here is a list of the Best Foreign Film Award given by Bengal Film Journalists' Association, India.

Year	Country	Film	Top 10 Films
1940	United Kingdom	Pygmalion
1941	United States	Gone with the Wind
1942	United States	Citizen Kane	United States - Citizen Kane; United States - Kitty Foyle; United States - Hold Back the Dawn; United States - The Letter; United States - The Philadelphia Story; United States - Meet John Doe; United States - Blossoms in the Dust; United States - The Great Dictator; United States - My Life with Caroline; United States - Back Street
1943	United States	How Green Was My Valley	United States - How Green Was My Valley: United States - Fantasia; United States - H. M. Pulham, Esq.; United States - Ball of Fire; United States - It Started With Eve; United States - Suspicion; United States - Two-Faced Woman; United States - The Little Foxes; United Kingdom - Pimpernel Smith; United States - Reap The Wild Wind
1945	United States	The Song of Benadette	United States - The Song of Bernadette; United States - Madame Curie; United States - Since You Went Away; United States - For Whom the Bell Tolls; United States - It Happened Tomorrow; United States - The Constant Nymph; United States - Going My Way; United States - Mission to Moscow; United States - Heaven Can Wait; United States - Jane Eyre
1946	United States - Gaslight	United States - Gaslight; United States - The Lost Weekend; United States - Arsenic and Old Lace; United States - A Song to Remember; United States - Wilson; United States - A Thousand and One Nights; United States - Henry V; United States - Dragon Seed; United States - The Seventh Cross; United States - The Picture of Dorian Gray

== See also ==
- Bengal Film Journalists' Association Awards
- Cinema of India
