= Prabhat Roy =

Indian Movie Director (born in 1946)

- প্রভাত রায়
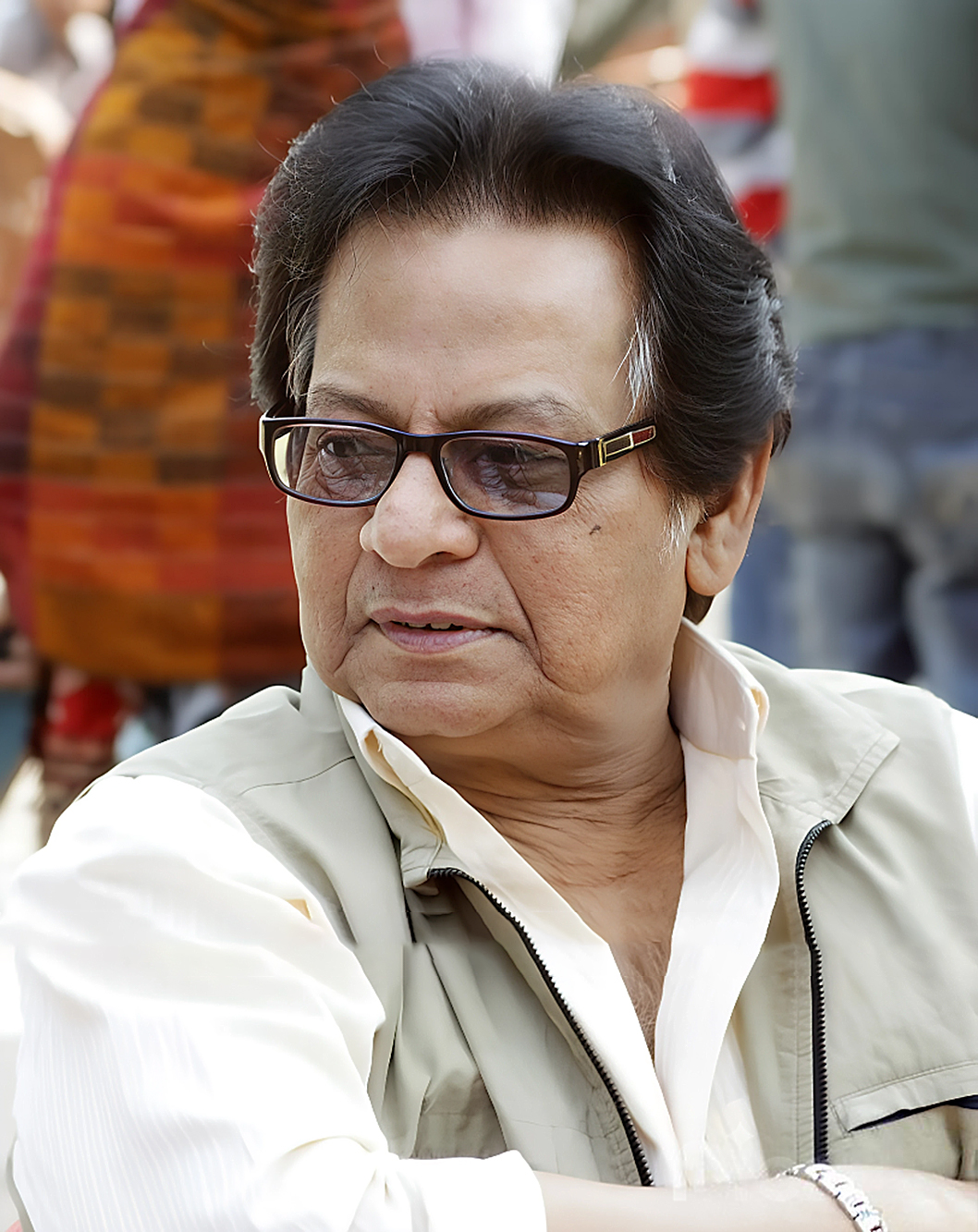
- Born: 1946 (age 79–80); Jamshedpore, British India (present-day Jharkhand, India)
- Citizenship: Indian
- Occupation: Filmmaker
- Notable work: Shwet Paatharer Thala; Sandhyatara; Lathi
- Spouse: Jayashree Roy (m. 1974; death 2022)
- Awards: National Award; Anandalok Awards

Prabhat Roy (Bengali: প্রভাত রায়; born 1946 in Jamshedpore) is a former Indian director who is known for his work in Bengali cinema. Winner of two National Awards, he is known for handling social issues in his directorial ventures Shwet Patharer Thala (1992), Sandhyatara (1994) and Lathi (1996).

He began his career as an assistant director in the early 1970s. He claimed to fame after his directorial venture Protidan (1983) starring Sharmila Tagore, Ranjit Mallick, Victor Banerjee and Naseeruddin Shah emerged to be a major box office success. He made commercial blockbusters such as Pratikar (1987), Pratik (1988), Lathi (1996) and Shubhodrishti (2005). Other than feature films, he directed 16 telefilms and 3 TV series. He introduced June Malia and Priyanka Trivedi to showbiz.

== Early life ==
Prabhat lived in Barrackpore, North 24 parganas, West Bengal but born in Jamshedpur. Prabhat studied at Ramakrishna Mission Siksha Mandir, Sarisha.He holds a bachelor's degree in Commerce from Maharaja Manindra Chandra College.

== Awards ==
Award	Year	Category	Film	Result	Ref.
National Award	1993	Best Feature Film on Family Welfare	Shwet Pathorer Thala	Won	
National Award	1997	Best Feature Film on Family Welfare	Lathi	Won	
National Award	2005	Best Popular Film Providing Wholesome Entertainment	Subhodrishti	Won	
Lux ETV Award	2005	Best Film	Manik	Won	
Anandalok Award	2006	Best Film	Shubhodrishti	Won	
7th Filmfare Awards Bangla	2024	Lifetime achievement Award		Won	
Kalakar Award				Won	

== Filmography ==
=== As a director ===
Year	Title		Cast	Language	Ref.
Year	Feature film	TV series	Cast	Language	Ref.
1983	Protidan		Sharmila Tagore, Ranjit Mullick, Victor Banerjee, Nasiruddin Shah, Lily Chakravarty, Anamika Saha		
1985	Bandhan Anjana		Sharmila Tagore	Hindi	
1986	Zindagani		Mithun Chakraborty, Rati Agnihotri, Raakhee	Hindi	
1987	Pratikar		Chiranjeet Chakraborty, Shakuntala Barua, Victor Banerjee, Madhabi Mukherjee, Satabdi Roy, Debashree Roy, Biplab Chatterjee		
1988	Pratik		Chiranjeet Chakraborty, Soumitra Chatterjee, Raakhee, Tapas Paul, Roopa Ganguly, Papiya Adhikari		
1989	Aamar Shapath		Prasenjit Chatterjee, Shatabdi Roy		
1989	Agnitrishna		Chiranjeet Chakraborty, Ranjit Mallick, Madhabi Mukherjee, Roopa Ganguly, Satabdi Roy		
1989	Hum Intezaar Karenge		Mithun Chakraborty, Padmini Kolhapure	Hindi	
1989	Pronomi Tomay		Arjun Chakraborty, Reshma Singh, Prosenjit Chatterjee, Sumitra Mukherjee, Biplab Chatterjee		
1990	Papi		Chiranjeet Chakraborty, Debashree Roy, Abhishek Chatterjee, Pallavi Chatterjee. Dipankar Dey, Kaushik Banerjee, Indrani Dutta		
1992	Anutap		Raj Babbar, Debashree Roy, Rabi Ghosh, Anup Kumar. Soumitra Bannerjee, Sanghamitra Bandyopadhyay (actress), Nirmal Kumar		
1992	Shwet Paatharer Thala		Aparna Sen, Dipankar Dey, Sabyasachi Chakraborty, Indrani Haldar, Rituparna Sengupta, Dilip Roy, Haradhan Bandopadhyay, Meenakshi Goswami, Lily Chakravarty, Bhaskar Banerjee, Gopa Aich, Sanghamitra Bandyopadhya		
1993	Duranta Prem		Deepak Sharma, Chandana Sen, Tapas Paul, Rachna Banerjee, Tota Roy Choudhury, Dolon Roy, Subhendu Chatterjee, Shakuntala Barua		
1994	Sandhyatara		Sabyasachi Chakraborty, Debashree Roy, Manoj Mitra, Uttam Mohanty, Sumanta Mukherjee		
1995		Andolan	Rituparna Sengupta		
1996	Lathi		Victor Banerjee, Soumitra Chatterjee, Prosenjit Chatterjee, Abhishek Chatterjee, Debashree Roy, Satabdi Roy, Rituparna Sengupta, Pallavi Chatterjee, Dulal Lahiri, Dipankar De, Sabyasachi Chakraborty, Haradhan Banerjee, Manoj Mitra, Nirmal Kumar, Kaushik Banerjee, Bodhisattva majumdar, Debika Mitra, Sanghamitra Bandyopadhyay (actress), Gita Dey, Tota Roy Choudhury, June Malia, Pushpita Mukherjee, Koushik Sen		
1997	Joddha		Chiranjeet, Debashree Roy, Tapas Paul, Abhishek Chatterjee, Priyanka Trivedi, Sabyasachi Chakraborty, Lily Chakravarty		
1997	Sedin Chaitramas		Sanjib Das Gupta, Indrani Dutta, Chiranjeet Chakraborty, Sanghamitra Bandyopadhyay (actress), Dipankar De		
1999	Khelaghar		Supriya Devi, Prosenjit Chatterjee, Rituparna Sengupta, Sreelekha Mitra, Abhishek Chatterjee, Pallavi Chatterjee		
1999	Shudhu Ekbar Bolo		Prosenjit Chatterjee, Rituparna Sengupta, Mouli Ganguly		
1999	Tumi Ele Tai		Victor Banerjee, Prosenjit Chatterjee, Rituparna Sengupta, Tapas Paul, Anuradha Roy, Santu Mukherjee, Sanghamitra Bandyopadhyay, Arpita Chatterjee		
2000	Shesh Thikana		Supriya Devi, Jaya Seal Ghosh, Sabyasachi Chakraborty, Shakuntala Barua		
2005	Ek Mutho Chhabi		Rajatabha Dutta, Sreelekha Mitra, June Malia, Arunima Ghosh, Roopa Ganguly, Indrani Halder, Pallavi Chatterjee, Samata Das, Monami Ghosh, Biplab Chatterjee, Moumita Gupta, Bikram Ghosh, Kunal Mitra, Koushik Sen, Dilip Roy		
2005	Manik		Jeet, Koel Mallick, Ranjit Mallick, Debdoot Ghosh, Samata Das, Shyamal Dutta, Biplab Chatterjee, Rajesh Sharma, Monu Mukherjee		
2005	Shubhodrishti		Jeet, Koel Mallick, Parambrata Chatterjee, Sanjib Dasgupta, Bharat Kaul, Laboni Sarkar, Biswajit Chakraborty, Dilip Ray		
2006	Priyotama		Jeet, Swastika Mukherjee, Laboni Sarkar		
2007	Pitribhumi		Jeet, Swastika Mukherjee.Lily Chakravarty, Shakuntala Barua		
2010	Hangover		Prosenjit Chatterjee, Subhra Kundu, Joy Kumar Mukherjee, Sayantika Banerjee, Subhashish Mukherjee, Biplab Chatterjee, Supriyo Dutta		
2011	Bhorer Alo		Priyanshu Chatterjee, Rituparna Sengupta, Rohit Roy, Anusmriti Sarkar		
2015	Birat 22				

- He also directed 16 telefilms & 3 TV Series.

=== Actor ===
- Abhimanyu (1989)
- Amanush (1975)

== Book ==
- Clapstick : Autobiography of Prabhat Roy
