= Satabdi Roy =

Indian actress, director, and politician (born 1969)

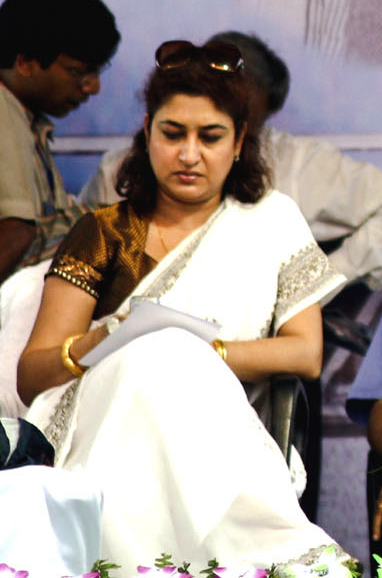

Member of Parliament, Lok Sabha
- Incumbent
- Assumed office 22 May 2009
- Preceded by: Ram Chandra Dome
- Constituency: Birbhum

Personal details
- Party: Nationalist Citizens Party of India (2026–present)
- Other political affiliations: Trinamool Congress (2009—2026)
- Born: 5 October 1969 (age 57); Agarpara, West Bengal, India
- Occupations: Actress; director; politician
- Years active: 1986–present
- Works: Full list
- Spouse: Mriganko Banerjee (m. 2001)
- Children: 2
- Awards: BFJA Awards

Satabdi Roy (born 5 October 1969) is an Indian actress, film director, and politician. As an actress, she is known for her work in Bengali cinema. She is a recipient of two BFJA Awards. As an actress, she ruled the array of commercial Bengali cinema during the late 1980s and 1990s. As a director, she has been denounced critically for her use of superfluous themes. She was a All India Trinamool Congress Member of Parliament, Lok Sabha from 2009 to 2026, later on she joined Nationalist Citizens Party of India on 2026.

Roy made her film debut opposite Prosenjit Chatterjee in Tapan Sinha's much acclaimed Bengali film Atanka (1986), which won her the BFJA Awards for the Best Supporting Actress in 1987. She shot to stardom after she had been paired with Tapas Paul in films such as Amar Bandhan (1986), Guru Dakshina (1987), Antaranga (1988), Apan Amar Apan (1990) and Abishkar (1990) to name a few. Her major hits with Prosenjit Chatterjee include Alingan (1990), Shraddhanjali (1993), Lathi (1996), Sakhi Tumi Kar (1996), Chandragrahan (1997), Ranokhetro (1998), Sajani Aamar Sohag (2000) and Trishul (2000) to name few. She made her Bollywood debut in National Award winning director Jyoti Sarup's Naya Zaher (1991). She collaborated with Tapan Sinha for the second time in his Antardhan (1992). She was conferred with the BFJA Awards for the Best Supporting Actress for the second time in 2005, for her performance in Raja Sen's Debipaksha. During her heyday, she was often compared to her contemporaries, such as Debashree Roy and Rituparna Sengupta. She made her directorial debut with Abhinetri (2006), which was an unequivocal reflection of the life and career of Bengali matinee idol Suchitra Sen. The film turned out to be a commercial as well as critical failure.

== Early life ==
She was born in Agarpara to Shailen and Nilima Roy. Satabdi Roy passed her Madhyamik from Sorojini High School in 1986 and later attended Jogamaya Devi College, a women's college affiliated to the University of Calcutta.

== Acting career ==
=== Debut and breakthrough (1986–1989) ===
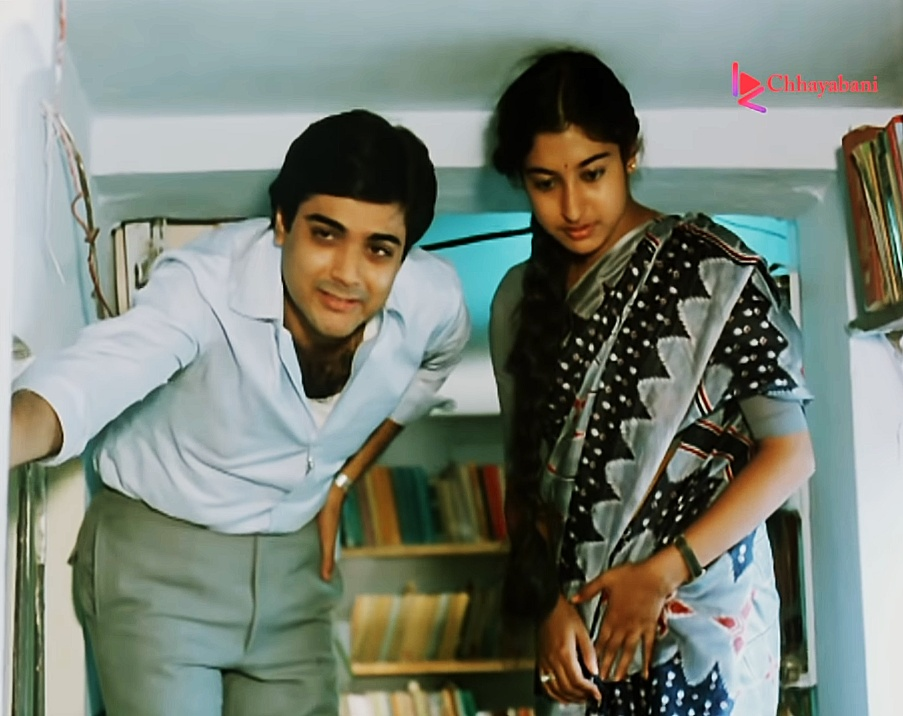
Prosenjit Chatterjee and Roy in a sequence in Atanka (1986)

Roy made her film debut opposite Prosenjit Chatterjee in Tapan Sinha's much acclaimed Bengali film Atanka (1986), which earned her the BFJA Award for Best Actress in a Supporting role in 1987. Earlier, she had worked in a film called Tina, directed by Dinen Gupta, but it was never released. She rose to stardom after she acted opposite Tapas Paul in Tapan Saha's Amar Bandhan (1986).

In 1987, she had five releases including Hiren Nag's Pratibha, Prabhat Roy's Pratikar, Anjan Mukhopadhyay's Nyay Adhikar, Biresh Chatterjee's Ekanta Apan and Anjan Choudhry's Guru Dakshina, which became a massive grosser at box office. She was paired with Tapas Paul in this film. She was soon pitted against Debashree Roy.

She reprised her chemistry with Paul in Dinen Gupta's Antaranga (1988) and Tarun Majumdar's Parashmani (1988). Both the films became massive grossers at box office.

She featured opposite Tapas Paul in Angar (1989) that became a major financial success.

=== Prime success (1990–2001) ===
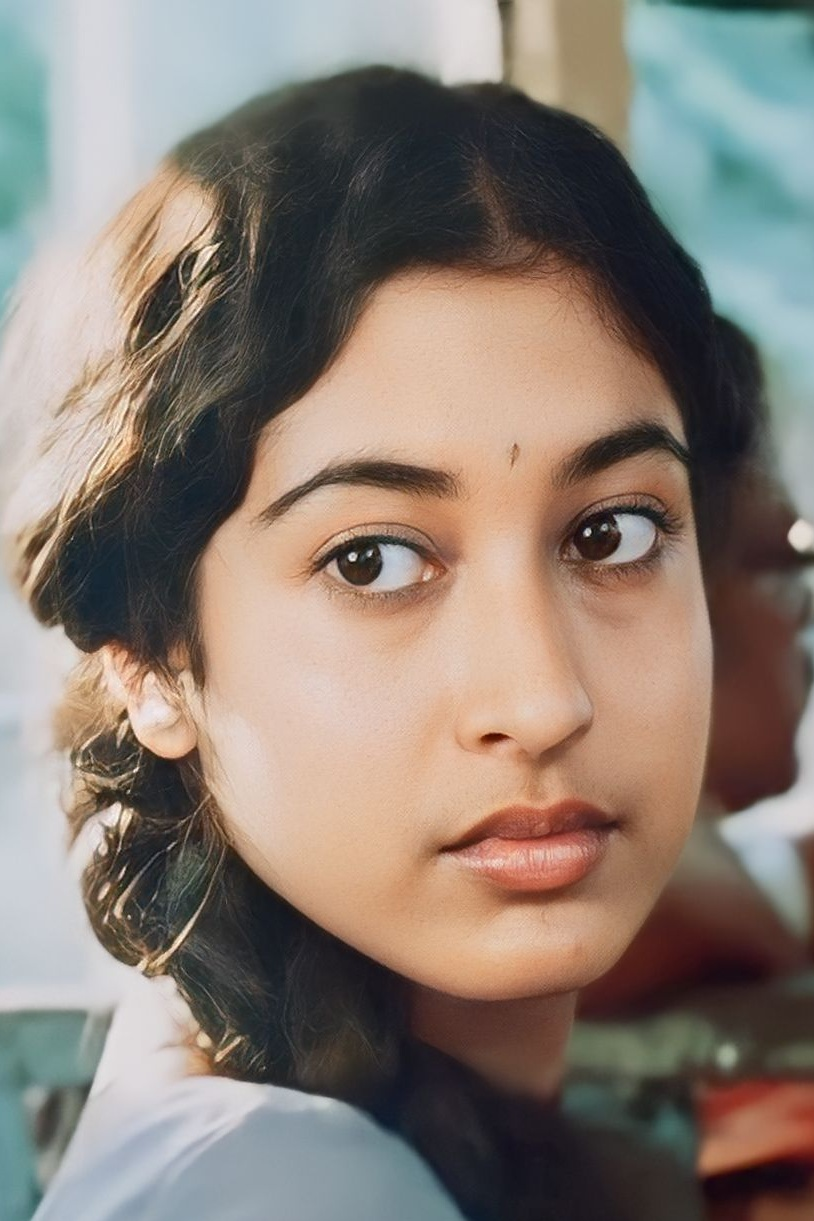
Roy in Atanka

The year 1990 saw Roy emerging out as a bankable film star with her two back-to-back commercial successes Apan Amar Apan by Tarun Majumdar and Abishkar by Salil Dutta. In both the films, she played the role of an aspiring singer, but was noted more for her role in Abishkar, where she essayed a singer who set out in a quest of her kidnapped sister-in-law. She was also noted for her role in Tapan Saha's Alingan (1990). She went on to convey hits such as Nandan Dasgupta's Prem Pujari (1991), Deb Singha's Adhikar (1992), Guru Bagchi's Pennam Kolkata (1992), Prashanta Nanda's Ghar Sansar (1993), Lal Pan Bibi (1994), Srikanta Guhathakurta's Shraddhanjali (1993), Chiranjeet Chakraborty's Sansar Sangram (1995), Swapan Saha's Sakhi Tumi Kar (1996) and Anjan Banerjee's Chandragrahan (1997) to name a few. She made her Bollywood debut in National Award winning director Jyoti Sarup's Naya Zaher (1991).

In 1992, Roy was approached to play the role of Sathi in Sreekanta Guha Thakurta's love-triangle film Shraddhanjali (1993). Initially she was hesitant to accept the role as she was required to share the screen with Debashree Roy. Prosenjit Chatterjee who played Amit in the film, mediated in this regard stating that he would tackle both the actresses. The plot revolves around three characters – Amit, Sathi and Bobby. Bobby falls in love with Amit who is already betrothed to Sathi.

She hit the pinnacle of her professional rivalry with Rituparna Sengupta in the late 1990s since the two were offered most of the female leads opposite Prosenjit Chatterjee after Debashree Roy vowed not to work with Chatterjee any longer. Still she managed to feature opposite Chatterjee in commercially successful Bengali films such as Lathi (1996), Sakhi Tumi Kar (1996), Bakul Priya (1997), Bidroho (1997), Chandragrahan (1997), Ranokhetro (1998), Swamir Aadesh (1998), Kalankini Badhu (2000), Sajoni Aamar Sohag (2000), Shapath Nilam (2000) and Trishul (2000).

=== Setback (2003–2013) ===
Her post-marital career was not successful. Swapan Saha cast her alongside Tapas Pal, Abhishek Chatterjee and Rituparna Sengupta in his family drama Sukh Dukkher Sansar (2003). The film was financial success. She then accepted the role of an embittered widow in Raja Sen's social drama Debipaksha (2004). Though a disaster at box office, the film fetched her another BFJA Award for Best Actress in a Supporting role in 2005.

=== Further roles (2016–2018) ===
She was approached to play the lead in Teesta, a stage adaptation of Bratya Basu's play Mukhomukhi Bosibar. Teesta was staged for the first time in January 2016. It was directed by Shekhar Samaddar and staged by Aabhash theatre group.

On 23 April 2016 Roy at the conference of the film Bizli (2018), declared that she would portray the antagonist Dr. Jerina in the film. Initially she was reluctant to play the role but finally gave her nod on Bobby's insistence. Her performance in the film was received well by critics.

She portrays an advocate in her upcoming Hindi film The Jangipur Trial.

== Career as a filmmaker ==
In 2011, a member of Indian censor board informed the chief minister Mamata Banerjee that Maya Mukherjee, the protagonist in the film Paribartan directed by Roy was modelled on the chief minister. The film was later released in 2017.

Roy cast Rituparna Sengupta opposite Tapas Paul in her directorial venture Om Shanti (2012). When interrogated whether the professional rivalry of the actresses duo would affect the shooting, Roy declined any such rivalry. She rather presumed that their collaboration would appeal the viewers. She also cast Rakhi Sawant for an item number in the film. Sengupta skipped the premier show of the film as she felt that Sawant had been given preference to herself in the poster of the film while Roy said that Sengupta's grievance was baseless. The film received negative review. It was a major financial disaster.

== Political career ==
She became the Member of Parliament, having won in the Lok Sabha election on a Trinamool Congress ticket from the Birbhum constituency of West Bengal in 2009. She again won from the same constituency on a Trinamool Congress ticket in 2014, 2019 and 2024. On 2025 she was announced deputy leader of her party in the Lok Sabha.

=== 2026 Rebellion ===
In June 2026, almost immediately after the massive Trinamool Congress defeat, around 20 MPs of TMC including Yusuf Pathan, Saayoni Ghosh, Shatrughan Sinha, Bapi Halder, Mala Roy, Mitali Bag, Deepak Adhikari, Arup Chakraborty, Sharmila Sarkar, Satabdi Roy, Rachna Banerjee, Prasun Banerjee and others, allegedly declared rebellion from their Party, and presented their written wish to join Bhartiya Janata Party. This group was led by Kakoli Ghosh.

Later, on 14 June, 20 MPs, including Satabdi Roy, signed a formal letter declaring their split from Trinamool Congress as to merge with the Nationalist Citizens Party of India (NCPI). They formally submitted the letter to Lok Sabha Speaker Om Birla.

The total strength of TMC in Lok Sabha had been 28, so that a number of 20 MPS made it eligible for splitting from the Party, as per the Indian Defection laws, so as to escape the anti-defection disqualification.

== Personal life ==
When not working on a shoot, Roy would teach acting at the Satabdi Foundation or spend time with her son Samyoraj Banerjee (Tozo), daughter Samiyana Banerjee (Zumi) and husband Mrigank Banerjee, Executive manager of Satabdi Roy Foundation.

== Filmography ==
=== Bengali films ===
Key
†	Denotes films that have not yet been released

Year	Title	Role	Note	Ref.
1986	Atanka	Subrata, Mastermoshai's daughter	Marked her feature film debut	
1986	Amar Bandhan			
1986	Bouma			
1987	Ekanta Apan			
1987	Gurudakshina	Rupa Roy		
1987	Nyay Adhikar			
1987	Pratibha			
1987	Pratikaar	Sandhya Banerjee		
1988	Aghat			
1988	Agni Sanket			
1988	Antaranga			
1988	Chhannachhara			
1988	Dena Paona			
1988	Maa Ek Mandir			
1988	Parashmoni			
1988	Punar Milan			
1988	Shudhu Tomari			
1989	Amar Shapath			
1989	Agni Trishna			
1989	Amanat			
1989	Angar			
1989	Biday			
1989	Bondini			
1989	Judge Saheb			
1989	Mahapith Tarapith			
1989	Mangal Deep			
1989	Maryada			
1989	Mone Mone			
1989	Manimala			
1989	Shatrupaksha			
1989	Srimati Hangsaraj			
1990	Abhimanyu			
1990	Abishkar			
1990	Alingan			
1990	Anuraag			
1990	Apan Aamar Apan			
1990	Bhanga-Gara			
1990	Chetana			
1990	Gharer Bou			
1990	Jwar Bhata			
1990	Kalanka			
1990	Omar Akbar		Bangladeshi film	
1990	Raktareen			
1991	Amar Saathi			
1991	Bidhir Bidhan			
1991	Maan Maryada			
1991	Prem Pujari			
1992	Adhikar			
1992	Antardhan	Ina		
1992	Dharma-Yuddha			
1992	Maa			
1992	Manikanchan			
1992	Natun Sansar			
1992	Pennam Calcutta			
1992	Shaitan			
1993	Arjun			
1993	Ghar Sansar			
1993	Kanyadan			
1993	Maan Samman			
1993	Prajapati	Sikha		
1993	Prathama			
1993	Premi			
1993	Shakti			
1993	Shraddhanjali	Sathi		
1993	Sukher Swarga			
1994	Ajana Path			
1994	Bidrohini			
1994	Kalpurush			
1994	Laal Paan Bibi			
1994	Nagjyoti			
1994	Phiriye Dao	Antara		
1994	Tumi Je Aamar	Soma		
1995	Abirbhab			
1995	Boumoni			
1995	Mashal			
1995	Pratidhwani			
1995	Sansar Sangram			
1995	Shesh Pratiksha			
1995	Sukher Asha			
1996	East Bengaler Chele		Delayed release	
1996	Kumari Maa	Rita		
1996	Jamai Babu			
1996	Joy Bijoy			
1996	Lathi	Lipi Mukherjee, Atindramohan's daughter		
1996	Sakhi Tumi Kar			
1996	Tridhara			
1997	Abhishapta Prem			
1997	Ajker Santan			
1997	Bahurupa			
1997	Bakul Priya	Priya		
1997	Bidroho			
1997	Chandragrahan			
1997	Mayar Badhon	Krishna		
1997	Pratirodh			
1997	Sarbajaya			
1998	Aparajita			
1998	Asal Nakal			
1998	Jiban Trishna			
1998	Kamalar Banabas			
1998	Putrabadhu	Monika		
1998	Raja Rani Badsha			
1998	Ranokhetro	Jhuma Bose		
1998	Shimul Parul			
1998	Sreeman 420			
1998	Swamir Aadesh			
1999	Gariber Raja Robinhood			
1999	Gunda			
1999	Jugbatar Loknath			
1999	Krishna Kaberi			
2000	Dabee			
2000	Didi Aamar Maa			
2000	Kalankini Badhu			
2000	Pita Swarga Pita Dharma			
2000	Rupasi Dohai Tomar			
2000	Sajoni Aamar Sohag	Rani Chowdhury		
2000	Satruta			
2000	Shapath Nilam			
2000	Trishul			
2001	Aami Jibonpurer Pathik			
2001	Bhalobasa Ki Aage Bujhini			
2001	Bidhatar Khela			
2001	Cancer			
2001	Etai Swarga			
2001	Janak Janani			
2001	Nadir Pare Aamar Bari			
2001	Shesh Bichar			
2001	Srimoti Bhayonkari			
2003	Chor O Bhagoban			
2003	Debipuja			
2003	Jua			
2003	Sukh Dukkher Sansar			
2004	Debipaksha	Rebati Bhattacharya		
2005	Dwiragaman			
2005	Nishachar			
2006	Abhinetri		This marked the directorial debut of Roy, who also wrote the story and screenplay, in addition to acting in it	
2008	Biyer Lagna			
2008	Shibaji			
2008	Tolly Lights		Special appearance	
2009	Dhakee		Roy directed the film and also wrote its story and screenplay, in addition to acting in it	
2009	Friend	Brishti	Roy directed the film and also wrote its story and screenplay, in addition to acting in it	
2010	Bejanma			
2010	Goodly			
2010	Megh Brishti Aalo			
2010	Friend Request			
2011	Bhoy			
2011	Fight 1:1			
2012	Om Shanti		Roy directed the film, in addition to playing a cameo in it	
2012	Ullas	Sumitra		
2013	Aleyar Alo			
2013	Swabhoomi			
2013	Sweet Heart			
2017	Paribartan		Roy directed the film and also wrote its story and screenplay, in addition to acting in it	
2018	Bizli	Dr. Jerina Hassan	First superhero-themed film in the Dhallywood film industry; Roy played the principle antagonist in this film	
2025	Batshorik	Swapna		

=== Hindi films ===
Key
†	Denotes films that have not yet been released

Year	Title	Role	Note	Ref.
1991	Naya Zaher	Richa	Marked her feature film debut in the Hindi film industry	
1993	Mulaquat	Rita		
1999	Love Story 98			
TBA	The Jangipur Trial †			

=== Odia films ===
Year	Title	Role	Director	Note	Ref.
1988	Bidhir Bidhan		Mohammed Mohsin	Marked her feature film debut in the Odia film industry	
1994	Emiti Bhai Jagate Nahin Jagate Nahin		Prashanta Nanda		

== Other works ==
=== Stage adaptations ===
Title	Director	Note	Ref.
Andhakaar O Rabindraramani			
Teesta	Shekhar Samaddar		

=== Reality show ===
Year	Title	Role	Note	Ref.
?	Satabdir Adday	Host		

=== Literary works ===
Year	Title	Publication	Note	Ref.
1995	Ei Shatabdir Prem	Dey's Publishing		
	Jhaal Mishti Premer Golpo	Deep Prakashan		
	Brishti Tumi Aamay Eka	Deep Prakashan		
	Jodi Bhalobaso	Dey's Publishing		
	Tumi Shudhu Tumi			
	Nirbhoy			
2006	Sweetheart	Deep Prakashan		

== Awards ==
Award	Year	Category	Film	Result	Ref.
BFJA Award	1987	Best Actress in a Supporting Role	Atanka	Won	
BFJA Award	2005	Best Actress in a Supporting Role	Debipaksha	Won	
Kalakar Awards	1996	Best Actress	Sansar Sangram	Won	
Kalakar Awards	1999	Best Actress	Raja Rani Badsha	Won	
Kalakar Awards	2005	Best Actress	Debipaksha	Won	
Kalakar Awards	2013	Best Director	Om Shanti	Won	
Bharat Nirman Awards	2001	Contribution in Film		Won	
