= Arijit =

Arijit may refer to:

- Arijit Singh Indian singer
- Arijit Roy Indian politician

== See also ==
- Arjit
