= Ekbar Bolo Bhalobashi =

Bangladeshi romantic action film

- Film poster
- Directed by: Badiul Alam Khokon
- Written by: Polur Ghatikachalam
- Starring: Shakib Khan; Apu Biswas; Misha Sawdagor; Toma Mirza; Shiba Shanu
- Music by: Ali Akram Shuvo
- Production company: BFDC
- Release date: 31 August 2011
- Running time: 160 minutes
- Country: Bangladesh
- Language: Bengali

Ekbar Bolo Bhalobashi (Bengali: একবার বল ভালবাসি) is a Dhallywood romantic action film that was released on August 31, 2011, in Eid ul-Fitr. The film was directed by Bodiul Alam Khokon and stars Shakib Khan and Apu Biswas. It also stars Misha Sawdagor, Toma Mirza, Shiba Shanu, Sadek Bachchu and Kazi Hayat in supporting roles. It was a remake of the 2005 Telugu film Mahanandi.

== Cast ==
- Shakib Khan
- Apu Biswas
- Misha Sawdagor
- Toma Mirza
- Shiba Shanu

== Soundtrack ==
Ekbar Bolo Bhalobashi

Soundtrack album by Ali Akram Shuvo
- Released: 2011
- Genre: Feature film soundtrack
- Producer: G series

The soundtrack of the film was composed by Ali Akram Shuvo.

=== Track listing ===
No.	Title	Artist(s)	Length
1.	"Ekbar Bolo Bhalobashi"	Andrew Kishore & Konok Chapa	4:28
2.	"Life Ta Enjoy Kore"	S.I.Tutul	3:58
3.	"Love You Love You"	Mila	4:02
4.	"Premer Jonno A Prithibi"	Runa Laila and Andrew Kishore	4:10
5.	"Ei Mon Chae Bolte"	Dolly Sayontoni and Andrew Kishore	4:30
6.	"Niyoti Ki Khoti"	S. I. Tutul	4:16
