= Bouma =

Typography term

In typography, a bouma (/ˈboʊmə/ BOH-mə) is the shape of a cluster of letters, often a whole word. It is a reduction of "Bouma-shape", which was probably first used in Paul Saenger's 1997 book Space between Words: The Origins of Silent Reading, although Saenger himself attributes it to Insup & Maurice Martin Taylor. Its origin is in reference to hypotheses by the prominent vision researcher Herman Bouma, who studied the shapes and confusability of letters and letter strings. The term was derived and popularized through extensive use by Hrant Papazian via discussion forums, conference presentations and published articles.

Some typographers believe that, when reading, people can recognize words by deciphering boumas, not just individual letters, or that the shape of the word is related to readability and/or legibility. The claim is that this is a natural strategy for increasing reading efficiency. However, considerable study and experimentation by cognitive psychologists led to their general acceptance of a different, and largely contradictory, theory by the end of the 1980s: parallel letterwise recognition. Since 2000, parallel letterwise recognition has been more evangelized to typographers by Microsoft's Dr Kevin Larson, via conference presentations and a widely read article. Nonetheless, ongoing research (starting from 2009) often supports the bouma model of reading.

== See also ==
- Visual thinking
