= Pita Swarga Pita Dharma =

2000 Bengali film by Milan Bhowmik

- Directed by: Milan Bhowmik
- Produced by: Amitava Karmakar; Milan Bhowmik
- Starring: Abhishek Chatterjee; Satabdi Roy; Lily Chakravarty; Anupam Kher; Biplab Chatterjee; Mrinal Mukherjee; Manoj Mitra; Subhendu Chatterjee
- Music by: Soumitra Kundu
- Release date: 2000
- Country: India
- Language: Bengali

Pita Swarga Pita Dharma is a 2000 Bengali film directed by Milan Bhowmik. The film's music was composed by Soumitra Kundu.

== Cast ==
- Abhishek Chatterjee
- Satabdi Roy
- Lily Chakravarty
- Anupam Kher
- Biplab Chatterjee
- Subhendu Chatterjee
