= Chhoto Bou =

- VCD cover
- Directed by: Anjan Choudhury
- Written by: Anjan Choudhury
- Screenplay by: Anjan Choudhury
- Story by: Anjan Choudhury
- Produced by: Prabir Rakshit (Shree Krishna Film Production)
- Starring: Ranjit Mallick; Sandhya Roy; Prosenjit Chatterjee; Debika Mukherjee
- Music by: Sapan Chakraborty
- Distributed by: Angel Video
- Release date: 15 July 1988
- Country: India
- Language: Bengali
- Budget: 30 lacs
- Box office: 90 lacs

Chhoto Bou (transl. Younger Wife) is a 1988 Bengali film directed by Anjan Choudhury and produced by Prabir Rakshit under the banner of Shree Krishna Film Production. The film features Ranjit Mallick, Sandhya Roy, Prosenjit Chatterjee, and Debika Mukherjee in the lead roles. The music of the film has been composed by Sapan Chakraborty. It was declared a blockbuster at the box office.

== Plot ==
The story is centred around a contemporary undivided Bengali Hindu middle-class family residing in the suburbs of Kolkata. The head of the family is a retired government employee who has gone blind due to cataracts. He lives in his own house with his wife, 3 sons & 2 daughters-in-law. The eldest son, nicknamed Minu is also a government employee, has a happy family in the form of his loving wife Mamata & son Raju, and is extremely devoted to his parents but since he contributes the least to the family income (only 500 rupees per month), Mamata (who came from a poor household that couldn't give any dowry) constantly faces psychological abuse from her mother-in-law & is made to do all the household chores single-handedly without any assistance from others.

The middle son, Chinu, is a businessman who contributes the most to the family (800 rupees per month), for which he is looked upon by his mother as the ideal son. So his wife Tandra refuses to do any household work, considering it to be below her dignity. Tandra is always scheming against the good-natured Mamata over various ways to insult & humiliate her. To add to Mamata's woes, Latika, the only sister of the 3 brothers, who is always visiting her parents even after her marriage to a rich businessman called Pradip, also assists Tandra in humiliating Mamata by making her prepare food for Pradip's household whenever their domestic maid takes leave. In spite of all the abuse she receives from Latika, Tandra & her mother-in-law, Mamata silently endures it in order not to hurt her caring father-in-law by sowing discord in the undivided family, much to the grief of Minu.

Since the mother-in-law measures the worth of people on the basis of the money they earn, she is also equally rude towards her blind husband, whose monthly pension of 150 rupees is mostly spent on his medications. She relishes every chance to deny her husband & Mamata good food by frequently inviting in her gluttonous brother.

The younger son Tanu works in a factory, contributes 600 rupees to the household & lives away from the family most of the time. There he falls in love with a young girl called Dipa. Dipa was orphaned at a young age & lives with her caring maternal uncle & aunt in their impoverished household. Dipa's aunt hates Dipa & in the absence of her husband, had tried to get Dipa married to a rich, old man in an attempt to get rid of her. However, the plan was foiled by Dipa's maternal uncle, who then immediately got her married to Tanu in a civil ceremony. Tanu sends the newly-wed Dipa to live with her in-laws. There, the strong-willed Dipa stands up against the abusive trio (Latika, Tandra & her mother-in-law) & emerges as a strong support for Mamata & her father-in-law, creating tensions in the family. The mother-in-law also takes an instant disliking for Dipa due to her coming from a poor household which was unable to afford dowry. Dipa's maternal uncle came to visit her at her in-law's but there he is insulted by the mother-in-law for his poverty & inability to afford a dowry.

One day, Dipa finds Mamata preparing a dish of punti fish for Latika's household, leaving behind Raju who is bedridden with fever. Dipa convinces Mamata to prioritise her son's health over Latika's tantrums, severely berates Latika for not being able to do domestic chores on her own & also the mother-in-law for not teaching her daughter the basic duties of a housewife. Believing that Mamata had instigated Dipa against her, Latika out of revenge foils Mamata's attempts to feed her bedridden son some Horlicks (which Minu had procured by borrowing money from his office colleagues) by informing it to her mother. The mother-in-law then proceeds to cruelly snatch away the Horlicks container & throw away the spoonful of Horlicks from Mamata's hand, taunting her by saying that she is too poor to afford such good food. This causes Mamata to break down into tears. To protest this inhumane act, Dipa snatches away apples (considered as an expensive fruit at that time) from her mother-in-law's hand, stating that based on her own philosophy, she is too poor to afford such costly fruits. Incensed at such an act of disrespect, the mother-in-law, at the instigation of Tandra, informs Tanu her version of the story, making it appear as if Dipa was abusing her elders. Tanu rushes home & confronts Dipa. When Dipa refuses any wrongdoing on her part, Tanu slaps her in front of all other family members. He then gets beaten by Minu (grateful towards Dipa for her support to Mamata). A furious argument ensures, during which the mother-in-law reveals that she isn't Minu's biological mother & proceeds to disown him & his wife. Tanu decides to remove Dipa away from the house & goes to complain about her to her maternal uncle. However, after hearing from Dipa's maternal uncle how his mother demanded dowry & insulted him, Tanu felt ashamed for slapping Dipa.

After disowing Mamata, the mother-in-law expected that Tandra would take care of her, but to her dismay, Tandra steadfastedly refused to do any household work, forcing the mother-in-law to do all work despite her advanced age. Soon however, she develops arrhythmia, which requires implanting a pacemaker, at the cost about 25,000 rupees. At the instigation of Tandra, Chinu refuses to contribute money for his mother's treatment, in order to buy a new flat for their residence. Latika also refuses to contribute money for her mother's treatment, in order to save up for her upcoming Kashmir trip. Minu then decides to voluntarily retire from his service, in order to treat his step-mother with the money of his provident fund. This selfless act causes the mother-in-law to reconcile with Minu & Mamata. But Dipa secretly arranges for money by selling all the gold ornaments of her late mother in order to prevent Minu from resigning, so that he could continue to take care of Mamata & Raju. When the mother-in-law comes to know about it, she reconciled with Dipa on the eve of her departure from the house. The story then ends with Mamata then helping Chinu (who had been defrauded by his business partner) to reconcile with his parents, thereby preventing him from being kicked out of the house.

== Cast ==
- Ranjit Mallick as Minu, the eldest son
- Sandhya Roy as Mamata, the eldest daughter-in-law
- Sumanta Mukherjee as Chinu, the younger son
- Sanghamitra Banerjee as Tandra, the younger daughter-in-law
- Prosenjit Chatterjee as Tanu, the youngest son
- Devika Mukherjee as Dipa, the youngest daughter-in-law & the main protagonist
- Ratna Ghoshal as Latika, Tanu & Chinu's sister
- Kali Bandyopadhyay as the father-in-law
- Meenakshi Goswami as the mother-in-law
- Soham Chakraborty as Raju, Mamata's son
- Nimu Bhowmik as Nitai, the gluttonous maternal uncle of Tanu & Chinu
- Arpita Baker

== Remakes ==
- Chinna Kodallu (1990) in Telugu
- Choto Bou (1990) in Bangladeshi cinema
- Chinna Marumagal (1992) in Tamil
- Panjuri Bhitare Shadi (1992) in Odia
- Chhoti Bahoo (1994) in Hindi

== Soundtrack ==
Song	Singer
"Jeeboner Saar Tumi"	Asha Bhosle
"Shono Shono Aaj Keno Mon Kore Gungun"	Asha Bhosle, Mohammed Aziz
"Jangole Lege Jaay"	Mohammed Aziz
"Ek Janamdukhi Duoranir Golpo"	Kavita Krishnamurthy
