= Atanka =

1986 Bengali political crime thriller film by Tapan Sinha

- Directed by: Tapan Sinha
- Written by: Tapan Sinha
- Screenplay by: Tapan Sinha
- Story by: Tapan Sinha
- Produced by: Charu Chitra
- Starring: Soumitra Chatterjee; Prosenjit Chatterjee; Satabdi Roy; Anil Chatterjee; Nirmal Kumar
- Edited by: Subodh Roy
- Music by: Tapan Sinha
- Distributed by: New Theatres No.1 Studios
- Release date: 30 January 1986
- Country: India
- Language: Bengali

Atanka is a 1986 Indian Bengali language political crime thriller film directed by Tapan Sinha. The film stars Soumitra Chatterjee, Prosenjit Chatterjee, and Satabdi Roy in her debut film. The film was known for its dark-tone and outstanding performances of the cast. The film ran for around 90 consecutive days at Mitra cinemas, west Bengal. The film was both critically and commercially successful and won 7 awards, and got an official entry at the Indian Panorama Section.

== Plot ==
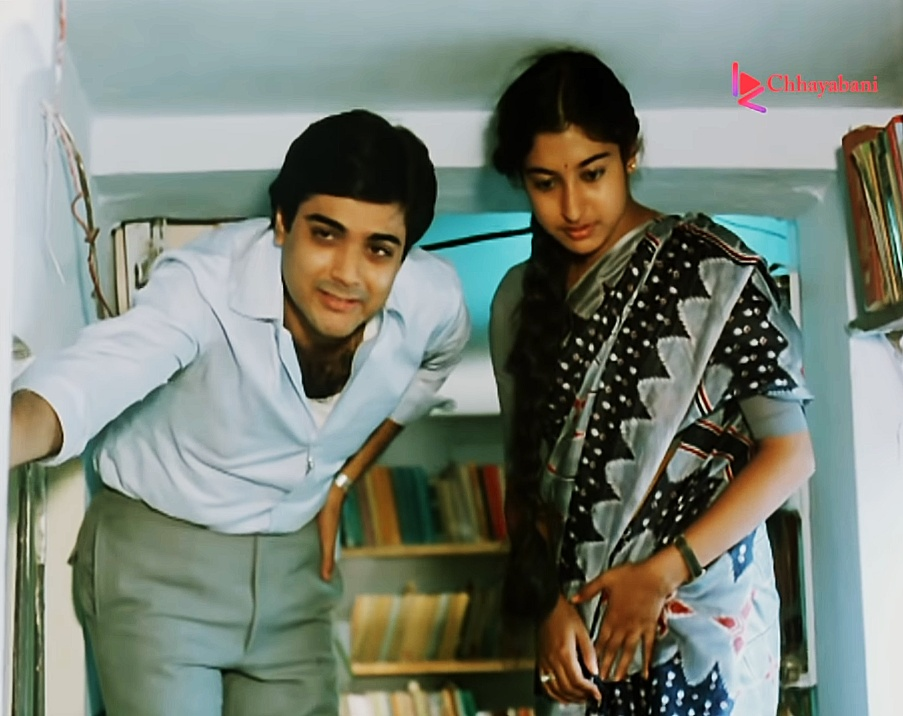
Prosenjit Chatterjee and Satabdi Roy in a sequence

The story revolves around a school master who witnesses a murder by his students, but the students threaten him not to speak a word, but he goes beyond the line and courageously punishes the students by the help of the law.

== Cast ==
- Soumitra Chatterjee as Sudhanshu Mukherjee / Master Moshai, a teacher
- Prosenjit Chatterjee as Prabir
- Sumanta Mukherjee as Mihir Samanta
- Satabdi Roy as Subrota, Sudhanshu's daughter
- Ranjan Bhattacharya as Subinoy, Sudhanshu's son
- Nirmal Kumar as Nabin
- Manoj Mitra as Suresh
- Anil Chatterjee as Aloke Chatterjee
- Bhishma Guhathakurta as Hebo
- Amar Ganguly as Dhurjati Prasad Maiti
- Shailen Mukherjee as Dr. Banerjee
- Arijit Guha as the SI of Tollygunge Police Station
- Ramen Roy Chowdhury as the ASI of Tollygunge Police Station
