= Amanush (2010 film) =

2010 Indian Bengali film

- Directed by: Rajiv Kumar Biswas
- Written by: Selvaraghavan
- Screenplay by: N.K. Salil
- Produced by: Shrikant Mohta of Shree Venkatesh Films
- Starring: Soham; Srabanti Chatterjee
- Cinematography: Kumud Verma
- Edited by: Rabi Ranjan Moitra
- Music by: Jeet Gannguli
- Production company: Shree Venkatesh Films
- Release date: 30 April 2010
- Running time: 165 minutes
- Country: India
- Language: Bengali

Amanush (transl. The Inhuman) is a 2010 Indian Bengali-language thriller film written and directed by Rajib Biswas, starring Soham Chakraborty and Srabanti Chatterjee in lead roles, whilst newcomer Rehaan Roy, Saswata Chatterjee play supporting roles. The film, which has music scored by noted musician Jeet Ganguly and cinematography handled by Kumud Verma, was released in April 2010. The film is officially a remake of the 2003 film Kaadhal Kondein starring Dhanush and Sonia Agarwal, which was already remade in Bangladesh as Onno Manush in 2004.

The story explores the mind of a youth who is mentally and physically abused in his childhood. The lack of a mother's love haunts the protagonist throughout the film as the girl of his infatuation parts with him in her death. Turning into a psychopath, he desperately tries to woo his newly found lady love.

== Plot ==
Vinod, who was orphaned at an early age, has grown up under the care of a church father, Father Rozario (Nagesh), in North Bengal, is an introvert but a genius. He is forcibly sent to college by Father Rozario but is a complete misfit in class. One day he solves a complex mathematics problem in class surprising his classmates. Though shunned and avoided by the rest of his class, a beautiful and educated young girl, Ria becomes his friend and he gradually warms up to her too. Impressed by Ria's heavenly beauty and charm, his feelings soon turn into love but he realizes that Ria considers him as only a friend. But he is unwilling to let her go. Meanwhile, Vinod learns that Ria is in love with another classmate, Aditya.

Ria's father is angered at learning about her love. He shuts her up and prevents her from contacting anyone. But Vinod comes and meets her on the pretext of getting some old clothes for himself to wear. Pitied by Vinod, her father allows him. But Vinod uses the chance and escapes with Ria. He convinces her that she will meet Aditya.

Vinod has set up a secret place for executing his plan of wooing Ria. He makes her stay with him while convincing her by talking about the never-impending Aditya's arrival. On one such day, he reveals his miserable past, where he is made to work for paid labor after being orphaned at an early age. He revolts against the oppression one day against the illegal child labor in vogue at his place. Promptly he is beaten black and blue for his profanity. Moreover, he also loses his girlfriend to rapists in that place, who also kill her. Somehow he manages to escape from them and seeks refuge in the place of Father Rozario.

Ria is touched by his past. Incidentally, the police and Aditya arrive at the place. While Vinod was away to get some food, they try to make Ria understand that Vinod was a psychopath. Yet Ria scoffs at their claims, citing his gentlemanly behavior over the days she was put up alone with him. Vinod, learning that the police have arrived at the scene, begins to indulge in mass violence. He opens fire, killing a police constable. Forcing them out of their hideout, he manages to evade the police Inspector and Aditya and successfully brings Ria back to their original place of stay.

Ria soon identifies the tiger out of the cow's skin. Vinod pleads with her, telling her that all he wanted in his life was her presence with him. But Ria called him a friend and stated her inability to accept him as her partner for life.

Meanwhile, Aditya regains consciousness and comes back to attack Vinod and rescue his girlfriend. A violent fight follows, where Vinod defies his puny self and treats Aditya with disdain. The fight culminates with Vinod, Aditya, and Ria finding themselves at the edge of a cliff.

While Ria clutches a tree bark tightly, Vinod and Aditya slip out and barely manage to hold either of her hands. Ria is forced into a situation where she needs to choose between her boyfriend and friend. Aditya's pleas notwithstanding, Ria doesn't have the heart to kill Vinod. The epic of a cliffhanger finally ends with Vinod smiling wryly at Ria and letting go of her hands himself. He falls dead into the deep valley.

== Cast ==
- Soham Chakraborty as Vinod, a psychopath
- Srabanti Chatterjee as Riya, Aditya's love interest
- Rehaan Roy as Aditya
- Rita Koiral
- Biswajit Chakraborty as police commissioner and Riya's father
- Saswata Chatterjee as ACP Raghav Roy
- Dolon Roy as Riya's mother

== Soundtrack ==
Amanush

Soundtrack album by Jeet Gannguli
- Released: 11 April 2010
- Genre: Feature film soundtrack
- Language: Bengali
- Label: SVF
- Producer: Jeet Gannguli

Singles from Amanush
- 1. "O My Love" Released: 21 Jun 2014; 2. "Du Chokhe" Released: 25 Feb 2015; 3. "Jiboner Jol Chobi" Released: 25 Feb 2015; 4. "Haye Rama" Released: 25 Feb 2015; 5. "Monta Kore Uru Uru" Released: 25 Feb 2015

All lyrics are written by Priyo Chattopadhyay, Goutam Sushmit, Prasen (Prasenjit Mukherjee), Chandrani Gannguli (English Part); all music is composed by Jeet Gannguli.

| No. | Title | Lyrics | Singer(s) | Length |
|---|---|---|---|---|
| 1. | "Oh My Love" | Prasen (Prasenjit Mukherjee), Chandrani Gannguli (English Part) | Kunal Ganjawala, Shreya Ghoshal | 5:11 |
| 2. | "Monta Kore Uru Uru" | Priyo Chottopadhyay | Jeet Gannguli | 4:36 |
| 3. | "Du Chokhe" | Goutam Sushmit | Sonu Nigam, Mahalaxmi Iyer | 4:18 |
| 4. | "Haye Rama" | Gautam Sushmit | Sonu Nigam | 4:12 |
| 5. | "Jiboner Jol Chobi" | Priyo Chattopadhyay | Jeet Gannguli | 5:04 |
| 6. | "Amanush" | Priyo Chattopadhyay | Jeet Gannguli |
| 7. | "Amanush Theme Music" | | Instrumental |

== Critical reception ==
Amrita Roychowdhury of The Times of India commented "Oh my love, Jeet Gannguli has done it again — giving the much-needed hype that Amanush needed when pitted against another big budget release of the week. When it comes to acting, Soham is a real revelation. It is a treat watching him play an underdog for which he also gathers complete sympathy from the crowd. The actor has some calibre to pull off a scene (or the film in this case) all by himself. He can convincingly play the sweet, ugly and psychotic killer — at the same time and without overdoing it.And finally, a word on the director. Considering that this is Rajib's second film, the director has told a gripping story."

== Sequel ==
- Amanush 2
