= Group theatre of Kolkata =

Tradition in theatres in the city of Kolkata

The group theatre of Kolkata refers to a tradition in theatres in the Indian city Kolkata, which developed in the 1940s as an alternative to entertainment-oriented theatres. As opposed to commercial theatres, group theatre is "a theatre that is not professional or commercial", characterized by its tendency for experimentation in theme, content and production, and its aim of using the proscenium stage to highlight social messages, rather than having primarily making-money objectives.

== Indian People's Theatre Association and Nabanna ==
The play Nabanna in 1944 is said to be the birth of group theatres in Kolkata. Nabanna was written by Bijon Bhattacharya, who also co-directed it with Sambhu Mitra. They were both active members of the Indian People's Theatre Association, the association of leftist theatre-artists. In the commercial theatres at that time, entertainment was the sole purpose. However, the time was tumultuous—the Indian independence movement was strengthening against the backdrop of the World War 2, and the plight of Bengal province was further worsened by the Bengal famine of 1943. Activists and thinkers attempted to use the media of theatre to highlight the plight of the people, and to stage a form of artistic protest.

Against this backdrop, the drama Nabanna portrayed a group of peasants as victim of the famine. The peasants had to leave their village due to famine, and they traveled to Kolkata with the hope for survival in the big city. However, they faced a series of crises and eventually got "...reduced to the most abject acknowledge poverty in Kolkata, where they develop a political awareness of their suffering". Another production of the Indian People's Theatre Association was Jobanbondi.

== Notion of group ==
Prior to the start of group theatre movement, the commercial theatre of Kolkata strived to attract audiences based on star-power. Popular actors such as Sisir Bhaduri, Ahindra Chowdhury and others were considered consistent crowd-pullers. The group theatre tried to depart from this paradigm. Instead of superstars, the emphasis in group theatre was on the group—which was commonly an amalgamation of non-professional participants who identified themselves with the social motives of the movement and participated in the production out of passion for the art. The attempt was to make gononatyo (people's theatre).

== Groups after Indian People's Theatre Association ==
The Indian People's Theatre Association dispersed in 1947. However, the principal members continued to carry its legacy by forming several groups with similar ideology. Ahindra Choudhury, Sombhu Mitra and Tripti Mitra were the leading members of the group Bohurupee. Raktakarabi, Tahar Nam Ti Ranjana, Char Adhyay (written by Rabindranath Tagore) were some of the earlier productions of Bohurupee. Utpal Dutt led another faction of artists and went to create classics like Tiner Talowar and Kallol. In the 1950s and 1960s, many critically acclaimed productions were staged, which used international literature including the works of Anton Chekhov, Luigi Pirandello, Henrik Ibsen and Bertolt Brecht. According to one critic, the productions had the "right mix of democratic politics — with certain groups drifting towards a revolutionary rhetoric — and humane ideals, based on literature drawn from the world over".

Notable group theatres include the Little Theatre Group, Gandharba, Theatre Commune, Amulya Natyagosthi, Calcutta Theatre, Nandikar. Ghola Kaalmukur

== Prominent theatre personalities ==
Some notable personalities associated with group theatre movement in Kolkata are as follows:

- Ajitesh Bandopadhyay: first president of Nandikar
- Anirban Bhattacharya: worked in Chetana, Bratyajan. Founded Hatibagan Sangharam
- Arpita Ghosh: mainly works in Pancham Vaidik
- Badal Sircar: known for Street Theatre, "Third Theatre", Angaanmanch theatre
- Bibhash Chakraborty: founded Anya Theatre
- Bratya Basu: founder of Kalindi Bratyajan
- Chandan Sen: worked in Indian People's Theatre Association, People's Little Theatre and Chena Mukh
- Chinmoy Roy: actor at Nandikar
- Chitra Sen: actress in Swapnasandhani
- Debesh Chattopadhyay: authored and directed many plays
- Debshankar Haldar: worked in Nandikar, Rangapat, Natyaranga, Sudrak, Gandhar, Bratyajon, Sansriti and Blank Verse
- Dwijen Bandyopadhyay: worked in many plays
- Gaurav Chakraborty: associated with the group Charbak
- Goutam Halder: worked in Nandikar, Naye Natua and Prachyo
- Hari Madhab Mukhopadhyay founder of ‘’Tritirtha’’
- Jochhon Dastidar: founded Rupantori and Charbak
- Kaushik Sen: founded Swapnasandhani in 1992
- Kharaj Mukherjee: authored, directed, acted and sang in several plays
- Kumar Roy: worked in Bohurupee
- Manoj Mitra: authored, directed and acted in several plays
- Meghnad Bhattacharya: artistic director of Bengali theatre group Sayak.
- Mohit Chattopadhyay: authored many plays
- Nilkantha Sengupta, founder of Bengali theater group - Theatre Commune, Kolkata
- Paran Banerjee: acted in Indian People's Theatre Association and Shrutee Rangam
- Parthapratim Deb: works in Nandikar and Baghajatin Alaap
- Poulomi Basu: daughter of Soumitra Chatterjee. Director and actress.
- Ramaprasad Banik: worked in Bohurupee. Founded Chena Mukh and Theatre Passion
- Riddhi Sen: works in Swapnasandhani
- Rudraprasad Sengupta: associated with the group Nandikar
- Sabyasachi Chakraborty: associated with the group Charbak
- Shaoli Mitra: worked in Bohurupee
- Sombhu Mitra: founder of Bohurupee, director
- Soumitra Chatterjee: authored, directed and acted in several plays
- Swatilekha Sengupta: actress of Nandikar
- Sohini Sengupta: actress and director at Nandikar
- Suman Mukherjee: director at Chetana
- Sujan Mukherjee: actor and director at Chetana
- Surangana Bandyopadhyay: works in Swapnasandhani
- Tripti Mitra: wife of Sombhu Mitra, Sangeet Natak Akademi Award winner was mainly a worker of Bohurupee
- Usha Ganguly, founded Rangakarmee theatre group in 1976
- Utpal Dutt: authored, directed and acted in several plays
