= Khaled Choudhury =

Indian artist (1919–2014)

- Born: 20 December 1919; Karimganj, Assam, India
- Died: 30 April 2014 (aged 94); Kolkata, India
- Occupations: Stage & Set Director, Bengali and Hindi theatre, Painter, Musician

Khaled Choudhury (20 December 1919 – 30 April 2014) was a theatre personality and artist of Bengal. He worked for various directors of both Bengali and Hindi plays, including Sombhu Mitra, Tripti Mitra, and Shyamanand Jalan in various capacities — creating the Stage, sets and costumes and later as music director. He was a bachelor. He has been awarded the Padma Bhushan for his contribution to theatre in India's Republic Day Honours List on 26 January 2012. He died on 30 April 2014 in Kolkata.

== Family background ==
Khaled Choudhury was born on 20 December 1919 in Karimganj, which was then in undivided Assam, a State of British India. His father was Chandranath Dutta Choudhury and his mother was Hem Nalini. His grandmother's brother, Gurusaday Dutt, had named him Chirakumar, but his father later changed the name to Chiraranjan Dutta Choudhury. This name he changed in 1943 to Khaled Choudhury (though he did not change his religion), as a consequence of strained relationship with his father. He moved to Kolkata (then Calcutta) in 1945. He died there after an illness on 30 April 2014.

== Contributions to theatre ==
In 1945, he joined the Bharatiya Gananatya Sangha (Indian People's Theatre Association). He joined Bohurupee in 1953. List of plays in which Khaled Choudhury had been involved primarily as Stage Director are:

Bohurupee Productions

- 1953 Dharmaghat directed by Sombhu Mitra;
- 1954 Rakta Karabi directed by Sombhu Mitra, as Music & Stage Director as well as Costumes Director;
- 1955 Swargiya Prahasan directed by Amar Gangopadhyay;
- 1955 Angshidaar directed by Amar Gangopadhyay;
- 1957 Daakghar directed by Tripti Mitra;
- 1958 Putul Khela directed by Sombhu Mitra;
- 1969 Barbar baanshi directed by Sombhu Mitra;
- 1970 Kingbadanti directed by Tripti Mitra;
- 1971 Pagla Ghora directed by Sombhu Mitra;
- 1972 Gandaar directed by Tripti Mitra;
- 1988 Jajaati directed by Kumar Roy;

Calcutta Theatre Productions

- 1959 Gotraantar directed by Bijon Bhattacharya;
- 1966 Debigarjan directed by Bijon Bhattacharya;

Theatre Unit Productions

- 1960 Krishnachura directed by Shekhar Chattopadhyay;
- 1964 Julius Caesar (Bengali) directed by Shekhar Chattopadhyay;
- 1969 Janmabhumi directed by Shekhar Chattopadhyay, as Music & Stage Director as well as Costumes Director;

Mukhosh Theatre Centre Productions

- 1960 Rajanigandhaa directed by Tarun Ray;
- 1960 Aar hobey na deri directed by Tarun Ray;

Nakshatra Productions

- 1960 Amrita Athith directed by Shyamal Ghosh;

Shishu Natya Sangha Productions

- 1961 Bisarjan directed by Narayan Bhattacharya;

Group Theatre Productions

- 1961 Strir Patra directed by Gita Bandopadhyay;
- 1962 Noey Chhoey directed by Gita Bandopadhyay;

Nandikar Productions

- 1961 & 1976 Saodagarer Nauko directed by Radharaman Tapadar;
- 1988 Sesh Sakkhatkar directed by Rudraprasad Sengupta;
- 1993 Feriwalar Mrityu directed by Rudraprasad Sengupta;
- 1995 Meghnadbadh Kabya directed by Gautam Haldar;

Anaamika Productions

- 1961 Ghar aur bahar (Hindi) directed by Shyamanand Jalan;
- 1967 Saanp uttara (Hindi) directed by Shiv Kumar Joshi;
- 1967 Shuturmurg (Hindi) directed by Shyamanand Jalan;
- 1968 Chhapte Chhapte (Hindi) directed by Shyamanand Jalan;
- 1968 Sacchhayi kya hai (Hindi) directed by Shyamanand Jalan;
- 1968 Evam Indrajeet (Hindi) directed by Shyamanand Jalan;
- 1969 Mere Bacche (Hindi) directed by Shiv Kumar Joshi;
- 1969 Vallabhpur ki roopkatha(Hindi) directed by Krishna Kumar;
- 1970 Aadhe Adhure (Hindi) directed by Shyamanand Jalan;
- 1971 Pagla Ghora (Hindi) directed by Shyamanand Jalan;
- 1971 Steel frame (Hindi) directed by Pratibha Agrawal;
- 1978 Surdas (Hindi) directed by Pratibha Agrawal;

Rupakar Productions

- 1962 Kaaler Jatra directed by Sabitabrata Datta;

Khelaghar Productions

- 1962 Chokher Bali directed by Bonani Choudhury;

Anukar Productions

- 1967 Singhasaner Khoyrog directed by Dwipen Sengupta;

Pujarinir Asar Productions

- 1969 Ankamalar deshe directed by Samir Chattopadhyay;

Aadakaar Productions

- 1969 Nishaad (Hindi) directed by Krishna Kumar;

Bangla Naatmancha Pratistha Samiti

- 1970 Laalan Fakir directed by Sabitabrata Dutta;
- 1971 Mudra Raakshash directed by Ajitesh Bandopadhyay;
- 1972 Tughlaq directed by Shyamanand Jalan;

Bharatiya Gananatya Sangha(Indian People's Theatre Assn)

- 1970 Professor Mamlock directed by Ranajit Sinha;
- 1998 Singhasan directed by Pankaj Munshi;

Shaoli Mitra

- 1971 Terrodactil directed by Tripti Mitra;

Rabitirtha Productions

- 1973 Chandaalika directed by Suchitra Mitra;

Rangakarmee Productions

- 1981 Guriya Ghar directed by Tripti Mitra;

Calcutta Puppet Theatre

- 1982 Ramayan(for children) directed by Suresh Datta;

Aarabdha Natya Vidyalaya

- 1984 Raktakarabi directed by Tripti Mitra;
- 1984 Doorasha directed by Tripti Mitra;

Theatre Workshop

- 1984 Bisarjan directed by Bibhas Chakraborty;
- 1991 Bera directed by Ashoke Mukhopadhyay;
- 1994 Eka ebong eka directed by Ashoke Mukhopadhyay;
- 1996 Saodagarer Nauko directed by Ashoke Mukhopadhyay;

Sangbarta

- 1984 Dragonbodher pala directed by Sunil Das;

Ensemble

- 1989 Uttaraadhikaar directed by Sohaag Sen;
- 1994 Uttarpurush directed by Sohaag Sen;

Sundaram Productions

- 1989 Alakanandar Putrakanya directed by Manoj Mitra;
- 1991 Shobhajatra directed by Manoj Mitra;
- 1994 Galpa Hekim Saheb directed by Manoj Mitra;
- 1998 Chhayar prasad directed by Manoj Mitra;

Samikkhan Productions

- 1990 Mrichhakatik directed by Pankaj Munshi;
- 1997 Antaraal directed by Pankaj Munshi;
- 2000 Swapna Ujaan directed by Pankaj Munshi;

Gandhar Productions

- 1992 Takhan Bikel directed by Ashit Mukhopadhyay;

Nibha Arts

- 1992 Darpane Saratsashi directed by Soumitra Chattopadhyay;

Theatrewala Productions

- 1993 Kaacher Dewaal directed by Biplabketan Chakraborty;

Patent Theatre Productions

- 1994 Third bell directed by Nirmalya Sengupta;
- 1996 Nihata Chaitanya directed by Rana Chattopadhyay;

Rangaroop Productions

- 1994 Je jon aache Maajhkhaane directed by Seema Mukhopadhyay;

Choopkatha Productions

- 1995 Aakorik directed by Ashit Mukhopadhyay;
- 1997 Janmadin directed by Ashit Mukhopadhyay;

Saayak Productions

- 1996 Karnaabati directed by Meghnad Bhattacharya;
- 1997 Dui Hujurer Galpo directed by Meghnad Bhattacharya;

Kalyani Natyacharcha Kendra

- 1997 Chilekothar Sepai directed by Gautam Haldar;
- 2000 Nakshi Kaanthar Maath directed by Gautam Haldar;

Anubhaas Productions, Howrah

- 1999 Apurbo golap directed by Sekhar Sammaddar;

== Folk music and folklore research ==
Khaled Choudhury got involved with folk music and folk-lore research in the 1960s. He was Secretary of the Folk Music and Folklore Research Institute at its inception in 1965, which collected a lot of folk music from eastern India. This entire collection was subsequently donated to the Lokasanskriti o Adivasisanskriti Kendra (Centre for Folk and Adivasi Culture), Govt. of West Bengal.

== Publications by Khaled Choudhury ==
- Theatere Shilpo Bhabona (Artistic Thought in Theatre)published by Pratikshan Publications.
- Lokoshongiter Prasangikota o Onyano Prabondho (Relevance of Folk Music and Other Essays) published by Loksanskriti o Adivasisanskriti Kendra.
- Smritir Sarani (Memory Lane)published by North Calcutta Film Society, 61 Lenin Sarani, Kolkata 700013, in July 2011

== Books on Khaled Choudhury ==
- "Khaledda" by Sudeshna Bosu, published by Ekushe Samsad, 2000
- "Khaled Choudhury" by Debashish Roychowdhury, published by Paschimbanga Natya Academy (West Bengal Drama Academy), 2005

== Awards ==
- Sangeet Natak Academy Award (1986);
- Nandikar Puraskar (1987);
- Shiromani Puroskar (1997);
- D.Litt. (Honoris Causa) from Rabindra Bharati University (2000);
- Chamanlal Memorial Award, New Delhi (2000);
- D.Litt. (Honoris Causa) from Vidyasagar University (2002);
- Kalidas Samman from Govt of Madhya Pradesh (2005);
- Dinabandhu Puraskar from Pashchimbanga Natya Akademi, Govt. of W. Bengal (2005);
- Paschim Banga Rajya Academy Award (2008);
- Fellow of Sangeet Natak Academy– Academy Ratna (2008);
- Padma Bhushan by Govt. of India (2012)
