= Dharti Ke Lal =

1946 film by Khwaja Ahmad Abbas

- Directed by: Khwaja Ahmad Abbas
- Written by: Khwaja Ahmad Abbas (screenplay, dialogue), Bijon Bhattacharya (screenplay), Krishan Chander (story),
- Story by: Krishan Chander
- Produced by: Khwaja Ahmad Abbas, IPTA Pictures
- Starring: Balraj Sahni; Tripti Mitra; Sombhu Mitra
- Cinematography: Jamnadas Kapadia
- Music by: Ravi Shankar
- Release date: 30 August 1946
- Running time: 125 mins
- Country: India
- Language: Hindustani

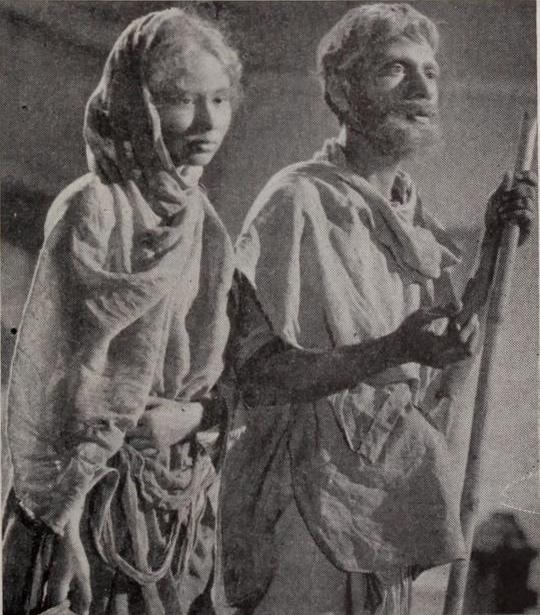
Usha Dutt and Shombhu Mitra in Dharti Ke Lal

Dharti Ke Lal (Hindi pronunciation: ['d̪ʱəɾ.t̪iː 'keː 'lɑːl]; transl. Children of the Earth) is a 1946 Hindustani film, the first directorial venture of the noted film director Khwaja Ahmad Abbas (K. A. Abbas). It was jointly written by Khwaja Ahmad Abbas and Bijon Bhattacharya, based on plays by Bhattacharya and the story Annadata by Krishan Chander. The film had music by Ravi Shankar, with lyrics by Ali Sardar Jafri, Nemichand Jain, Vamiq, and Prem Dhawan.

The film was based on the Bengal famine of 1943, which killed millions of Bengali people, and was one of the first films in Indian cinema's social-realist movement. In 1949, Dharti Ke Lal also became the first Indian film to receive widespread distribution in the Soviet Union (USSR), which led to the country becoming a major overseas market for Indian films.

== Overview ==
Dharti Ke Lal was critically acclaimed for its scathing view of the notorious Bengal famine of 1943, in which millions of Bengalis died. It is considered an important political film as it gives a realistic portrayal of the changing social and economic climate during World War II.

The film focuses on the plight of a single family caught in this famine, and tells the story of human devastation, and the loss of humanity during the struggle to survive.

During the Bengal famine of 1943, members of the Indian People's Theater Association (IPTA) travelled all over India, performing plays and collecting funds for the survivors of the famine, which destroyed a whole generation of farmer families in Bengal. Thus, the film's director and writer Khwaja Ahmad Abbas was deeply influenced by the work of IPTA, and hence based his script upon two of IPTA's plays: Nabanna (Harvest) and Jabanbandi by Bijon Bhattacharya, and the story Annadata by Krishan Chander. Even the cast of the film consisted mainly of actors from IPTA.

The film marked another chapter in the influential new wave in Indian cinema, which focused on socially relevant themes as in Neecha Nagar (1946), made by Chetan Anand, also scripted by Abbas, and which continued with Bimal Roy's Do Bigha Zamin (1953).

It was the first and possibly only film produced by IPTA, and is still considered one of the important Hindi films of the 1940s. The film marked the screen debut of Zohra Sehgal and also gave actor Balraj Sahni his first important on-screen role.

The New York Times called it "a gritty realistic drama."

It was highly influential to both to future filmmakers, who admired its neorealist-like qualities, and to intellectuals of India's left-wing.

== Cast ==
- Tripti Mitra
- Sombhu Mitra
- Balraj Sahni
- Rashid Ahmed
- Damayanti Sahni (Balraj Sahni's actual wife)
- Rashid Khan
- K. N. Singh
- David
- Zohra Sehgal
- Snehprabha Pradhan
