= Kolkata Youth Theatre Festival =

- Genre: Theatre
- Locations: India, Kolkata city
- Years active: 2014 – Present
- Founded: 2014
- Leader: Shriek of Silence

The Kolkata Youth Theatre Festival popularly known as KYTF. This Youth Theatre Festival was launched by Shriek of Silence(S.O.S). After the grand success of the festival in 2014, Kolkata Youth Theatre Festival is primed to become bigger and better. The festival is unique with different genres of theatre melting in the same pot.

== Introduction ==
Kolkata being the cultural capital of the country is also synonymous with theatre, legends like Girish Ghosh, Utpal Dutta, Sambhu Mitra and many others have contributed to the upliftment of the theatre scenario in the city. It is the city with the maximum number of registered theatre groups per capita in the world. Shriek of Silence (S.O.S) steps forward to contribute to the current theatre scenario on its birthday. Kolkata Youth Theatre Festival is launched by Shriek of Silence. It is a confluence point of celebrities and theatre veterans along with upcoming thespians.

== History ==
The Kolkata Youth Theatre Festival began in the year 2014 under the aegis of Shriek of Silence (S.O.S).

Shows

- The Stone Age
- Merchant Of Venice -The Kolkata Musical
- Jawab
- Hitchcock
- The East Side Story
