= Kumar Roy =

Bengali theatre personality (1926–2010)

- Born: Kumarendra Narayan Roy; 2 March 1926; Dinajpur, Bangladesh
- Died: 28 February 2010 (aged 83); Kolkata, India
- Occupations: Theatre director, actor
- Notable work: Direction of Nabanna (1948)

Kumar Roy (1926–2010) was a Bengali theatre actor, director and playwright. In 1983 he won the Sangeet Natak Akademi Award. He was associated with the group Bohurupee. In 1989 he directed the re-creation of the classic play Nabanna (1948). He was the president of the PashchimBanga Natya Akademi (West Bengal State Theatre Academy) from 2006 till his death in 2010. Kumar Roy was also professor of drama at Rabindra Bharati University, Kolkata and visiting professor at Sangeet Bhavan, Visva-Bharati, Santiniketan.

== Plays ==
=== Direction ===
- Chauryananda (by Tulsi Lahiri, 1956)
- Natyakarer Bipatti (by Ajit Ganguli, 1956)
- Geetaratna (by Chittaranjan Ghosh, 1956)
- Mrichchakatik (by Śūdraka, 1979)
- Galileo (by Bertolt Brecht, 1980)
- Rajdarshan (by Manoj Mitra, 1982)
- Aguner Pakhi (by Jean Anouilh, 1984)
- Malini (by Rabindranath Tagore, 1986)
- Mr. Kakatua (by Prashanta Deb, 1987)
- Yayati (by Girish Karnad, 1988)
- Kinu Kaharer Thetar (by Manoj Mitra, 1988)
- Nabanna (by Bijon Bhattacharya, 1989)
- Nindapanke (by Jean-Paul Sartre, 1991)
- Shyama (by Sisir Kumar Das, 1992)
- Akbar Birbal (by Sisir Kumar Das, 1993)
- Piriti Parama Nidhi (by Chittaranjan Ghosh, 1994)
- Sinduk (by Sisir Kumar Das, 1995)
- Muktadhara (by Rabindranath Tagore, 1996)
- Ek Din Ek Rat (by Sisir Kumar Das, 1997)
- Lal Kaner (Rabindranath Tagore's Rakta Karabi in Hindi 1986, under the Sangeet Kala Mandir)
- Itihaser Atmaa (by Ashim Chatterjee, 2000)
- Fulla Ketur Pala (2002)
- Nishiddha Thikana (2004)
- Deepa Danda (2005)
- Kaal Sandhya (by Buddhadeb Bosu 2008)

=== Acting ===
- Rakta Karabi
- Putulkhela
- Bisarjan Raja
- Muktadhara
- Pagla Ghoda
- Mudrarakshas
- Baki Itihas
- Chop Adalat Cholche
- Mrichchaakatik
- Galileo
- Raj Darshan
- Dharmadharma
- Aguner Pakhi
- Malini
- Nabanna
- Nindapanke
- Ek Din Ek Raat

== Awards ==
- Sangeet Natak Akademi Award, (1983)
- Dinabandhu Puraskar (2003)
- National Theatre Award of India (1985)
