= Sayak =

Bengali theatre group created in 1973

- Official logo of Sayak
- Type: Theatre group
- Location: Kolkata, West Bengal, India
- Artistic director: Meghnad Bhattacharya

Sayak (Bengali pronunciation: [ʃaːjoːk]) is a Bengali theatre group. The theatre group was created in December 1973. The group is directed by Meghnad Bhattacharya. Till January 2012, they have staged 21 full-length and 7 short-length plays.

== Selected plays ==
Here is a list of selected plays performed by Sayak -

=== Full-length plays ===
- Andhagali.
- Anubikshan.
- Avisapta.
- Basbhumi.
- Beokuf.
- Dayabadhdha.
- Dildar.
- Dournama.
- Gyan Briksher Fol.
- Lamppost.
- Mukti! Mukti!
- Pinki Buli.

=== Short plays ===
- Astitwa.
- Benche Thaka.
- kalbihanga.
- Mara Chand.

== Awards ==
- West Bengal Natya Academy - 6 times.
- Shiromoni Puroshkar (Asian paints)
- Dishari Award.
- Ultorath Award.
- Anandolok Award.

== See also ==
- Group theatre of Kolkata
