= Banga Bibhushan =

- State Civilian award
- Awarded for: Services of personalities in various fields
- Sponsored by: Government of West Bengal
- Location: West Bengal
- Reward: ₹200,000
- First award: 2011

Banga Bibhushan Samman (Bengali: বঙ্গবিভূষণ) is the highest civilian title instituted by the West Bengal government to honour the services of personalities in various fields. The Banga Ratna Samman and the Banga Bhushan Samman ("Bengal ornament" বঙ্গ ভূষণ) awards are also granted.

The award was conceived by Mamata Banerjee, Chief Minister of West Bengal, on 25 July 2011.

== List of awardees ==
=== 2011 ===
Name	Field
Amala Shankar	Dance
Mahashweta Devi	Literature
Sandhya Mukhopadhyay	Music (Bengali Modern Songs)
Supriya Devi	Film (acting)
Manna Dey	Music (Bengali Modern Songs and Hindi Film Music)
Amjad Ali Khan	Music (Indian Classical Instrumental)
Dwijen Mukhopadhyay	Music (Rabindra Sangeet and Bengali Modern Songs)
Shailen Manna	Sports (Football)
Haradhan Bandopadhyay	Film (acting)

=== 2012 ===
Name	Field
Suchitra Sen	Film (acting)
Leslie Claudius	Sports (hockey)
Jogen Chowdhury	Painting
Rudraprasad Sengupta	Theatre
Bibhas Chakraborty	Theatre
Shaoli Mitra	Theatre
Shirshendu Mukhopadhyay	Literature
Sanjeev Chattopadhyay	Literature
Goutam Ghose	Film (Direction)
Joy Goswami	Literature
Ranjit Mallick	Film (acting)
Pandit Ajoy Chakraborty	Music (Hindustani Classical)
Ustad Ali Ahmed Hussein Khan	Music (Sehnai)

In May 2012, The Sunday Indian reported that Ravi Shankar had refused the award.

=== 2013 ===
Name	Field
Amitabha Chowdhury	Journalist
B.K. Birla	Industrialist
Mithun Chakraborty	Film (acting)
Narayan Debnath	Artist
Purna Das Baul	Singer
Rituporno Ghosh	Film Maker
Sabitri Chatterjee	Actor
Sandhya Roy	Actor
Subir Sen	Singer
Subhaprasanna	Painter
Sourav Ganguly	Sports
Chuni Goswami	Sports
P. K. Banerjee	Sports
Tulsidas Balaram	Sports
Thankamani Kutti	Dancer

=== 2014 ===
Name	Field
Alakananda Roy	Culture / Dance
Dipankar De	Film
Madhabi Mukherjee	Film
Brij Mohan Khaitan	Industrialist
Makhanlal Natta	Jatra
Nrusingha Prasad Bhaduri	Literature / Indology
Sukumar Mukherjee	Medicine
Arun Bhaduri	Music
Sonam Tshering Lepcha	Folk music
Haimanti Sukla	Music
Mohan Singh Khangura	Music (Classical)
Justice Md. Abdul Ghani	Social service / Law
Father Félix Raj	Social service / Education

=== 2015 ===
Name	Field
Firoza Begum (Posthumous)	Music (Vocalist)
Ramakrishna Mission	Institution
Bharat Sevashram Sangha	Institution
Abdul Rashid Khan	Music (Vocalist)
Girija Devi	Music (Vocalist)
Manilal Nag	Music (Instrumentalist)
Buddhadev Das Gupta	Music (Instrumentalist)
Shankar Ghosh	Music (Tabla exponent)
General Shankar Roychowdhury	Ex-Chief of Army Staff
Kabir Suman	Music (Singer-songwriter)
Rashid Khan	Music (Vocalist)
Dibyendu Palit	Literature
Syed Nayeemuddin	Sports (Football)
Satyabrata Ganguly	Industrialist
Sanjiv Goenka	Industrialist
Shree Venkatesh Films	Film (Institution)
Leander Paes	Sports (Tennis)
Lyangsong Tamang	Social service
Manohar Aich	Sports (Bodybuilding)
Ramapada Chowdhury	Literature

=== 2018 ===
The Banga Bibhushan of 2018 was awarded on 21 May, to the following:

Name	Field
Asha Bhosle	(singer)
Binapani Debi	(Mathua Activist)
Girija Shankar Roy	(academic)
Suhrid Kumar Bhowmick	(linguist)
Samaresh Majumder	(writer)
Subrata Bhattacharya	(footballer)
Mohammed Habib	(footballer)
Prosenjit Chatterjee	(actor)
Shyamal Kumar Sen	(judge)

=== 2022 ===
Name	Field
Pandit Anindo Chatterjee	Music
Bikash Sinha	Physicis
Mohun Bagan	Sports
East Bengal	Sports
Mohammedan Sporting	Sports
Abhijit Banerjee	Economist
Kaushik Basu	Economist
Kumar Sanu	Music
Abhijeet Bhattacharya	Music
Harshavardhan Neotia	Business Entrepreneur
Radhe Shyam Goenka	Business Entrepreneur
Abul Bashar	Writer
Debshankar Halder	Theatre

=== 2026 ===
Name	Field
Anant Maharaj (revoked)	Politics
Shibaji Chatterjee	Music
Nachiketa Chakraborty	Music
Sriradha Banerjee	Music
Lopamudra Mitra	Music
Iman Chakraborty	Music
Babul Supriyo	Music

== See also ==
- Banga Bhushan
- Rabindra Puraskar
