= Pinki Buli =

- Original language: Bengali
- Characters: Pinki; Buli; Pinki's mother The old man

Premiere
- Official website

Pinki Buli or Pinky Buly is a Bengali drama directed by Meghnad Bhattacharya. This a production of Bengali theatre group Sayak. The drama explores the complex relation between a master and a servant.

== Plot ==
Pinki is a city teenage girl and Buli is a village girl. Parents of Pinki appoints Buli as a domestic helper-cum-babysitter for Pinki's months-old brother Bumba. The two characters are poles apart from each other and the drama explores the relation between them. Despite their cultural and social differences they become friends.

== Cast ==
- Rimi Saha as Pinki
- Bhaswati Chakraborty as Buli
- Runa Mukherjee as Pinki's mother
- Meghnad Bhattacharya as the old man
