= Nabanna (disambiguation) =

Nabanna is a Bengali harvest celebration usually celebrated with food and dance and music.

Nabanna may also refer to:

- Nabanna (drama), a Bengali language play written by Bijon Bhattacharya in 1944
- Nabanna (building), a building in Howrah which houses the temporary State Secretariat of West Bengal
