= Jukti Takko Aar Gappo =

1974 film by Ritwik Ghatak

- Film poster
- Directed by: Ritwik Ghatak
- Written by: Ritwik Ghatak
- Produced by: Rita Productions, Ritwik Ghatak
- Starring: See below
- Cinematography: Baby Islam
- Edited by: Amalesh Sikdar
- Music by: Ustad Bahadur Khan
- Release date: 30 September 1977 (Kolkata)
- Running time: 120 mins
- Country: India
- Language: Bengali

Jukti Takko Aar Gappo scene (1 min 28 secs)
Nilkantha Bagachi (character played by Ritwik Ghatak) is talking to Satyajit Basu (character played by Utpal Dutt). In this scene Bagchi is narrating that his life is wasted (like many others lives).

Jukti Takko Aar Gappo (Jukti tôkko aːr gôppo, transl. Reason, Debate and a Story) is a 1974 Bengali film directed by auteur of Indian cinema Ritwik Ghatak. Jukti Takko Aar Gappo was Ritwik Ghatak's last film. The film was believed to have a cinematography way ahead of its time. The film won National Film Award's Rajat Kamal Award for Best Story in 1974.

== Synopsis ==
In this film Ghatak plays Nilkantha Bagchi, an alcoholic, disillusioned intellectual, in the character's own words, "a broken intellectual". His wife leaves him, taking his books and records which were his only remaining property. When Bagchi objects, Durga replies that it is so that his son grows up with these books and music. However, he manages to keep a fan which he sells to buy country liquor to start his unusual and abstract journey.

His first companion is Nachiketa, a homeless woman who comes to his house just when he is about to leave. She is Bongobala, a woman who has lost her homeland, Bangladesh, and Bagchi describes himself as the spirit of Bangladesh, who was driven away from Bangladesh. He then comes across a band of artists drinking at a remote place where they discuss art. He meets Satyajit Basu, his friend who offers him Scotch, which he refuses. He asks for money to which Satyajit at once agrees and gives him a bunch of notes of which he took only one and then he said "Think Think practice thinking". He then meets Jagannath Bhattacharjee, a village school teacher of Sanskrit. Jagannath's school was closed after political killings and he came to Kolkata in search of a job. He was harassed by the kids, as they called him mad he was always getting into arguments. Then they came to a village where Panchanan Ustad lived. He received them and Ustad and Jaggannath had frequent arguments creating a contrast between Vedic and Folk perspectives after Nilkantha met his wife. He went into a forest where he met Naxalites, with whom he discussed Marxist history and he described them as the "cream of Bengal" misguided, successful and unsuccessful at the same time. Then the police come and a shootout begins. Bagchi, after taking a bullet dies, saying "Do you remember Madan the weaver he used to say will I buy raw stock from the bourgeoisie? Betray all of you? By not working, I have become stiff so I weave without cotton, something has to be done".

== Themes ==
The film deals with various ideas and themes. Set against the backdrop of the first Naxalite wave of rebellion in India, the film is considered to be Ghatak's autobiographical film, an anti-climax. Ghatak himself explained, "In it [Jukti Takko Aar Gappo] the political backdrop of West Bengal from 1971 to 1972 as I saw it has been portrayed. There is no ideology. I saw it from a point of view of not a politician. I am not supposed to please a political ideology". Ghatak was aware of a complete breakdown of moral values around him, especially among the younger generation. He tried to portray these issues in this film (and also in his unfinished film Sei Vishnupriya). Ghatak, both in real life and in this film, tried to find some meaning for the political and cultural turmoil overtaking his country.

Imagery

In an interview Ghatak mentioned that "The Great Mother Image" in its duality exists in every aspects of our being, and he incorporated this image into films like Meghe Dhaka Tara and Jukti Takko Aar Gappo.

Allegorical characters

The characters in this film have been portrayed allegorically.

- Ghatak played the character of Nilkantha Bagchi, his alter ego. Nilkantha is the name of Hindu god Shiva, who drank poison that emerged from the oceans to prevent it from destroying everything in the world.
- Tripti Mitra played the role of Nilkantha Bagchi's wife Durga (influenced by Hindu goddess Durga; also according to Hindu mythology, Durga is a consort of Shiva). In an interview Ghatak described his wife Surama Ghatak as a Sati (a very pious woman, and consort of Shiva).
- Ritaban Ghatak (Ghatak's real life son) played the character of Nilkantha Bagchi's son Satya. In Sanskrit and Bengali the word Satya means "true" or "real".
- The character Nachiketa is inspired by the Hindu mythological character Nachiketa.
- The character Jagannath Bhattacharjee, a Sanskrit language teacher, has been depicted as a representative of ancient Vedic civilisation.
- Panchanan Ustad is representative of rural people, not very educated, but very rich with their own (folk) culture and heritage.

== Credits ==
=== Cast ===
- Nilkantha Bagchi: Ritwik Ghatak
- Nachiketa: Sugata Burman (Manik Barmon Roy)
- Durga: Tripti Mitra
- Satya: Ritaban Ghatak
- Bongobala: Shaoli Mitra
- Jagannath Bhattacharjee: Bijon Bhattacharya
- Satyajit Basu: Utpal Dutt
- Panchanan Ustad: Gyanesh Mukherjee
- Leader of Naxalites: Ananya Ray
- Police inspector: Shyamal Ghoshal
- Alcoholic person in village: Jahor Roy

Others

- Satindra Bhattacharya
- Tarak Chattopadhyay
- Nani Chattpadhyay
- Subrata Sensharma
- Tapan Chattopadhyay
- Munir Choudhury.

=== Technical team ===
- Direction: Ritwik Ghatak
- Assistant directors: Deb Dutta, Ananya Roy, Nikhil Bhattacharya, Dilip Mukhopadhyay, Tapan Saha
- Story, screenplay, music and executive producer: Ritwik Ghatak
- Cinematography: Baby Islam
- Assistant cinematographer: Shankar Chattopadhyay, Dipak Das
- Editorial team
  - Editor: Amalesh Sikdar
  - Assistant: Kali Prasad Roy
  - Supervisor: Ramesh Joshi
- Art direction: Rabi Chattopdahyay
- Assistant: Surath Das, Suresh Chandra Chanda, Somnath Chakraborty
- Dance choreography: Shambhu Bhattacharya
- Publicity layouts: Khaled Choudhury
- Music: Ustad Bahadur Khan
- Playback singers: Debabrata Biswas, Ranen Ray Choudhury, Arati Mukhopadhyay, Binpani Roy Choudhury
- Sound recording: Shyam Sundar Ghosh

== Soundtrack ==
The following songs appear in the film's soundtrack, scored by Ustad Bahadur Khan:

1. Keno cheye achho go Ma (singer Sushil Mallick and Debabrata Biswas)
2. Amar onge onge ke bajaye banshi (Rabindra Sangeet)
3. Namaz aamar hoilo na adaay
4. Chhau dance
5. Janti gachhe janti phal je

== Reception ==
- "Jukti Takko Aar Gappo, a film so daring in its complete disregard of the very language and grammar of cinema he had mastered and developed that it is difficult to understand how it achieves its intense intimacy with the audience. It is as if the characters step out of the screen to talk to you and you are forced to respond to them, to react very sharply for or against them. The central character played by Ghatak himself parodies his real life in such a way that it compels the audience to reflect and criticise him. Perhaps this is just what Ritwik had been struggling to do through cinema all his life. Ironically, perhaps, he wanted to see that it could be achieved only through a conscious rejection of much of what has come to be accepted as the language of cinema." –Safdar Hashmi
- "In Jukti Takko Aar Gappo, the elements were presented in their new raw form — reason, argument, story, song that hunger which is the basis of human creativity. So that Ritwik calls himself a humbug a civilisation sees how it is reduced to ashes. Yet there was no nihilism; he dies pleading with those who would annihilate their compassion along with their enemy. Our heroism will find itself trapped in mechanical crossfire of gunpowder, if it refuses to nourish itself on nature and history. For Ritwik, the heroic act the ultimate and the first sacrifice, has to be the act of union."– Kumar Shahani

== Screenings in different festivals ==
- 2017: Ritwik Ghatak Retrospective UK, at Dundee Contemporary Arts, Dundee, Scotland, UK, Programme curated by Sanghita Sen, Department of Film Studies, St Andrews University, UK

== Accolades ==
In a 2012 poll conducted by Sight & Sound, 2 critics and 2 directors (including Amit Dutta) included the film on their respective lists of "The Greatest Films of All Time", hence making it the 322nd best film according to the Director's poll (a rank it shares with Subarnarekha).

== Sources ==
- Ghatak, Ritwik (17 January 1987). Cinema and I. Ritwik Memorial Trust.
- Shampa Banerjee (1985). Profiles, five film-makers from India: V. Shantaram, Raj Kapoor, Mrinal Sen, Guru Dutt, Ritwik Ghatak. Directorate of Film Festivals, National Film Development Corp. ISBN 978-81-201-0007-7.
- "Jukti, Takko aar gappo". Trigon film.
