= Tripti Mitra =

Indian actress

- Born: Tripti Bhaduri; 25 October 1925; Dinajpur, Bengal, British India
- Died: 24 May 1989 (aged 63); Kolkata, West Bengal, India
- Occupations: theatre actor, director
- Known for: "Bohurupee"
- Spouse: Sombhu Mitra
- Children: Shaoli Mitra
- Awards: Padma Shri (1971)

Tripti Mitra (née Bahaduri; 25 October 1925 – 24 May 1989) was a popular Indian actress of Bengali theatre and films, and wife of Sombhu Mitra, a noted theatre director, with whom she co-founded the pioneering theatre group Bohurupee in 1948. She acted in films like Jukti Takko Aar Gappo and Dharti Ke Lal.

She was awarded Sangeet Natak Akademi Award, the highest Indian recognition given to practicing artists by Sangeet Natak Akademi, India's National Academy for Music, Dance and Drama in 1962 for Theatre acting, and the Padma Shri in 1971 by Government of India in Arts field.

== Early life and education ==
Tripti Mitra was born in Dinajpur (British India) on 25 October 1925. Her father was Ashutosh Bhaduri and mother was Shailabala Debi. In Dinajpur Minor School she studied up to class six, then she came to Kolkata and got admission in Pyaricharan School. After passing Higher Secondary Examination from that school, she got admission in Ashutosh College. But she could not complete her studies since she got a job. She married Sombhu Mitra in December, 1945. She had a daughter Shaoli Mitra, who was an actress and director.

== Career ==
Tripti Mitra had been acting in theatre since her teens. She first acted in her cousin Bijon Bhattacharya's play Agun (Fire) in 1943. After watching her stage performance in noted IPTA play, Nabanna (Harvest) based on Bengal famine of 1943, director Khwaja Ahmad Abbas took her to Bombay to act in Gana Natya Sangha's film Dharti Ke Lal in 1943, partly based on the play. Her first Bengali film was Pathik in 1953, the film was directed by Debaki Kumar Basu. She also acted in Ritwik Ghatak's last film, Jukti Takko Aar Gappo (1974).

In 1948, Shombhu and Tripti Mitra founded their own theatre group named Bohurupee. She acted in innumerable plays mostly along with her husband Sombhu Mitra, a colossus in the field of theatre, to become one of the most legendary beings of Bengali theatre, most famous for her role as Nandini, the protagonist of Rabindranath Tagore's Rakta Karabi. She also acted in Jago Hua Savera, a 1959 Urdu movie produced in Dhaka, East Pakistan (now Bangladesh), based on a Manik Bandopadhya's classic novel Padma Nadir Majhi. Tripti Mitra died on 24 May 1989.

== Filmography ==
- Jukti Takko Aar Gappo (1974)
- Charankabi Mukunda Das (1968)
- Seba (1967)
- Kanchanranga (1964)
- Suryasnan (1962)
- Manik (1961)
- The Day Shall Dawn (1959)
- Shubha Bibaha (1959)
- Asha (1956)
- Joy Maa Kali Boarding (1955)
- Rickshaw-Wala (1955)
- Moyla Kagaj (1954)
- Pathik (1953)
- Bodhodoy (Short) (1951)
- Gopinath (1948)
- Dharti Ke Lal (1946)

=== Plays ===
- Agun
- Nabanna
- Jabanbandi
- Gopinath
- Ulukhagra
- Chaar Adhyay (based on Rabindranath Tagore's novella of the same name)
- Rakta Karabi (Tagore's "Red Oleander")
- Raja (Tagore's "The King of the dark chamber")
- Baki Itihaas
- Daakghor (she produced and directed Tagore's The Post Office (play))
- Sutorang
- Aparajita
- Visarjan

== Awards ==
- Sangeet Natak Akademi Award in 1962
- Padma Shri in 1971
- Kalidas Samman by Madhya Pradesh Government in 1989

== See also ==
- Bengali theatre
