= Ranur Pratham Bhag =

Bengali film

Ranur Pratham Bhag is a Bengali drama film directed and produced by Nabyendu Chatterjee based on a same name story of Bibhutibhushan Mukhopadhyay. This film was released in 1972 under the banner of Mahamaya Productions. Child actress Neera Maliya received the National Award as Best Child Artist.

== Cast ==
- Ajitesh Bandyopadhyay
- Gita Dey
- Asit Bandopadhyay
- Dwiju Bhawal
- Neera Maliya
- Moni Srimani
- Bankim Ghosh
- Kanika Majumdar
- Nibhanani Debi
