= Tilanjali =

1944 novel by Subodh Ghosh

Tilanjali is a 1944 Bengali language novel authored by Subodh Ghosh. The novel was published serially in Desh.

The novel is a love story set in the backdrop of the 1943 Bengal famine. In Tilanjali, the author contrasts the ideological postures of the Indian National Congress and the Communist Party of India (criticizing the position of the communists).
