= Subodh Ghosh =

Bengali writer and journalist (1909–1980)

- Born: 14 September 1909; Hazaribagh, Bengal Presidency, British India (present-day Jharkhand, India)
- Died: 10 March 1980 (aged 70); Calcutta, West Bengal, India
- Occupations: Journalist, writer

Subodh Ghosh (14 September 1909 – 10 March 1980) was a noted Indian author of Bengali literature and a journalist associated with the Kolkata-based daily newspaper Anandabazar Patrika. His best known work, Bharat Premkatha, is about the romances of epic Indian characters and has remained very popular in the Bengali literary world. Many of his stories have been adapted in Indian films, most notably Ritwik Ghatak's Ajantrik (1958) and Bimal Roy's Sujata (1959). He won the Filmfare Award for Best Story twice, for Bimal Roy's Sujata (1960) and for Gulzar's Ijaazat in 1989. He was selected as a recipient for the Bharatiya Jnanpith Award (1977) but he refused it.

== Early life ==
Born on 14 September 1909 at Hazaribagh in present-day Jharkhand, Ghosh studied at St. Columba's College and was also privately tutored by scholar Mahesh Chandra Ghosh. At the beginning of his career, he worked as a bus conductor to financially support himself while pursuing writing as a secondary job.

== Selected works ==
Novels

- Tilanjoli
- Gangotri
- Trijama
- Preyoahy
- Satkiya
- Sujata
- Suno Boronari
- Bosonto Tilok
- Jiavorli
- Bagdatta

Story-Book

- Fossil
- Parshuramer Kuthar
- Gotrantar
- Suklavishar
- Gram Jamuna
- Bonikornika
- Jatugriha
- Mon Vramar
- Thirbijuri
- Kusumeshu
- Bharat Premkatha
- Jalkamal

Others

- Bharityo Foujer Itihash
- Kingbodontir Deshe
- Amritopothojatri

== Film Adaptation ==
- Ajantrik
- Parshuramer Kuthar
- Jatugriha
- Ijaazat
- Sujata
- Chitchor (1976 film)

Suno baro nari 1960 film
