= Manik (1961 film) =

1961 Bengali film

- Directed by: Bijalibaran Sen
- Based on: Oliver Twist by Charles Dickens
- Starring: Chhabi Biswas; Pahari Sanyal; Shambhu Mitra; Tulsi Chakraborty; Tripti Mitra; Chhaya Debi; Jahar Ganguly
- Music by: V. Balsara
- Production company: Chalacchitra Prayas Sanstha
- Release date: 13 January 1961
- Country: India
- Language: Bengali

Manik is a Bengali drama movie released in 1961, directed by Bijalibaran Sen under the banner of Chalachitra Prayas Sanstha. V. Balsara scored the music of the movie. This film was based on Oliver Twist, the famous 1838 novel of Charles Dickens.

== Plot ==
On a stormy night, a pregnant young lady stumbles into an orphanage where she gives birth to a boy. The mother dies soon leaving the newborn baby who is taken in custody by Natabar Ghoshal (Gangapada Bose), the manager of the orphanage. The boy is given the name 'Manik.'

Manik grows up with fellow orphan kids amidst a harsh and unsympathetic environment of the orphanage, courtesy to the crooked manager. Ten Years later, one day Manik is physically abused by the manager as he has opened mouth to the district magistrate on a fundraising ceremony about the ill-treatment the orphans face in the orphanage and as punishment is practically 'sold' to a small businessman (Tulsi Chakraborty). The latter at his wife's (Chhaya Debi) intention puts the boy in charge of arranging pyres for cremation. Having been regularly abused both physically and mentally, one day Manik runs away and reaches Calcutta only to find himself into a harsher and un-familiar society. While roaming on the streets, he catches the attention of an "antisocial gang" run by a ruthless criminal named Fakirchand (Shambhu Mitra).

Meanwhile, Natabar goes through Manik's late mother's belongings(stolen and kept hidden so far by the elderly midwife of the orphanage, who before dying speaks the truth to the manager) and from some documents learns that Manik's now-deceased father was the only child of a feudal lord of an estate in Burdwan. With an expectation to be handsomely rewarded he goes to the estate only to know that Manik's grandfather, Lakshmikanta Chowdhury (Chhabi Biswas) is now paralyzed and aphasic due to a brain stroke years ago and his estate is run by his crooked nephew Bireshwar, who is the only known heir to the large inheritance. Databar is initially tricked into revealing the truth behind and into handing over all the documents (except one letter from Manik's father to his grandfather, which is enough to prove Manik's identity) as he is not aware of Birshwar's true nature. Bireshwar manages one of Manik's photos from Natabar and overtime reaches Fakirchand and instructs him to make the innocent boy a criminal, thus destroying him morally which will make him unfit for the inheritance.

Manik was put in custody of a criminal couple - Ganesh (Amar Gangopadhyay)and Neeli (Tripti Mitra), both being members of the gang and close confidantes to Fakirchand. While Ganesh is a hot-head and a drinker Neeli develops some sibling affection towards Manik as he happens to be the namesake of her deceased brother. One day, during an unsuccessful operation Manik is caught and sent to police custody, from where he is bailed out by the kind-hearted Mahendra Babu (Pahari Sanyal), who himself has been the target of the gang's foiled operation. He takes Manik to his home and starts teaching him manners, but Neeli and Ganesh abduct the boy once again. Databar becomes aware of Bireshwar's evil plan and changes his mind for good. He contacts Mahendra Babu, who happens to be known to the Chowdhury family and the two decide to rescue Manik from the evil clutches of both Fakirchand and Bireshwar. However their conversation is overheard by Birshwar who rushes to Fakirchand and this time intends to kill the boy, to which Fakirchand agrees. Neeli overhears their foul plan and to save the boy's life; betrays her gang and provides Mahendra Babu with valuable information in time only to get herself exposed to Fakirchand and ultimately murdered by Ganesh at that night.

The next morning, as Mahendra Babu learns about Neeli's fate, he persuades the investigating police officers to go after Fakirchand, Ganesh, and the whole gang. With the help of sniffer dogs, police reach the gang's hideout. Fakir Chand and Ganesh fall from the roof to their death while attempting to escape, the group is caught, and Birshwar is handed over to police by Databar. Manik is rescued, and his well-wishers take him to his grandfather, and thus the movie ends with the happy reunion.

== Cast ==
- Trinanjan Mitra as Manik
- Chhabi Biswas as Manik's grandfather, Shree Lakshmikanta Chowdhury
- Pahari Sanyal as Mahendra Babu
- Sombhu Mitra as Fakirchand alias Babaji
- Tulsi Chakraborty as Manik's evil employer
- Chhaya Devi as the employer's wife
- Gangapada Basu as Natabar Ghoshal, manager of the orphanage
- Tripti Mitra as Neeli, a member of Fakirchand's gang
- Jahar Ganguly as Abinashbabu
- Amar Gangopadhyaya as Ganesh, member of Fakirchand's gang and Neeli's husband
- Nibhanani Debi
