= Subhaprasanna =

Indian artist

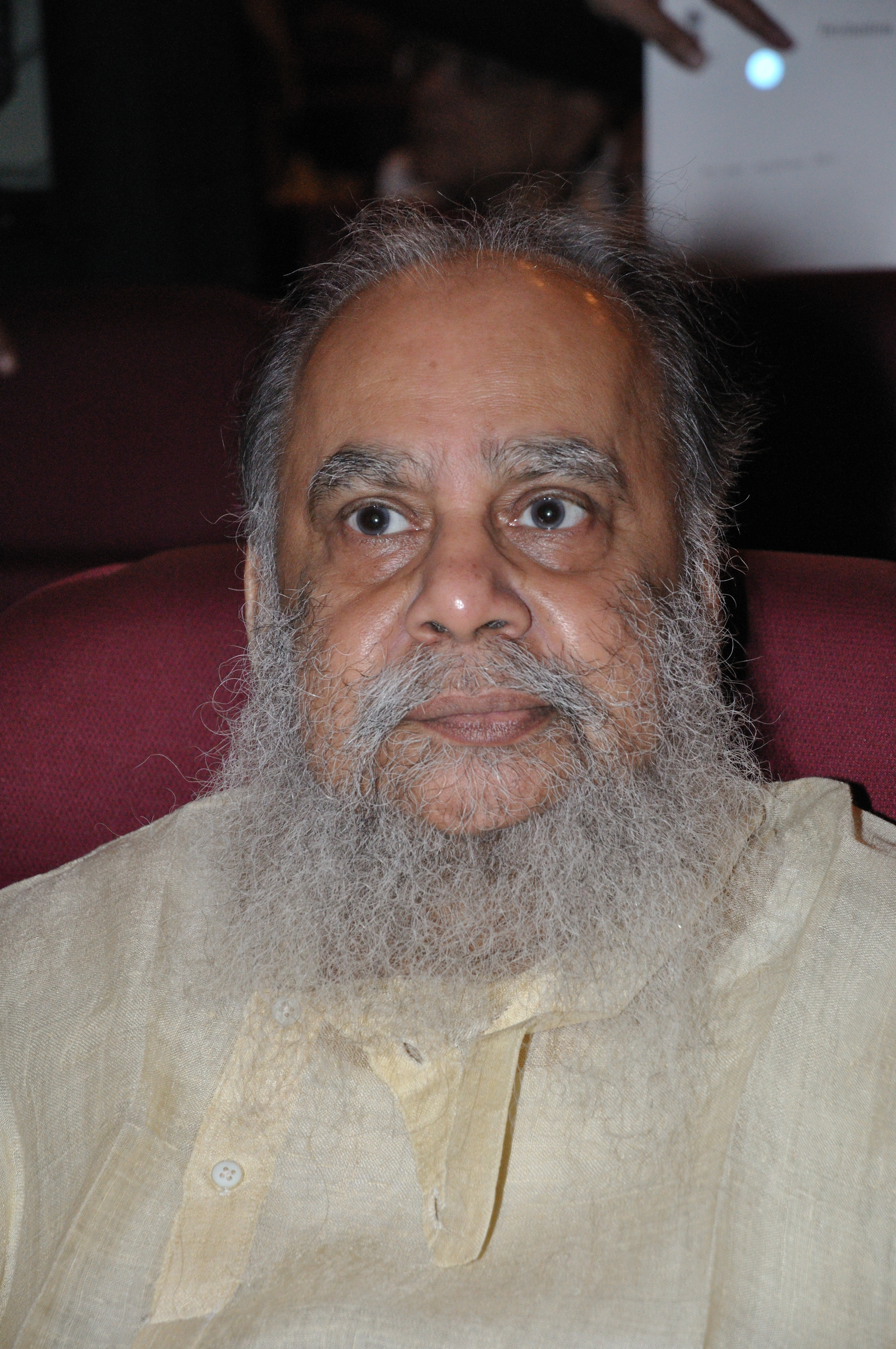
- Subhaprasanna at an event in the Science City Kolkata, May 2011
- Born: Subhaprasanna Bhattacharjee; 20 October 1947 (age 78); Kolkata, West Bengal, India
- Known for: Painting
- Notable work: Vastraharan, Middletone, Golden Flute, The Crows, The Owl, Abode, Cat 3, Illusion, A fairy tale, Golden
- Awards: Banga Bibhushan (2013)
- Website: www.shuvaprasanna.com

Subhaprasanna Bhattacharjee is an Indian artist, born in Kolkata in 1947. He graduated from the Indian College of Arts (Rabindra Bharati University, Kolkata) in 1969. He was an active member of the Calcutta Painters group. He married artist Shipra Bhattacharya. Subhaprasanna was the student of the famous painter Debdoot Sheet.

== Paintings ==
The city of Kolkata has always figured prominently in his work. His themes come from personal interactions with its urban milieu - its sickness and sordidness, violence and vulnerability, and all that compounds its existential agony. In the 1960s and 1970s, his work was influenced by the turbulence and political violence of Kolkata.

Subhaprasanna has depicted varying moods of the city and its people, its places, and all its facets that make it distinctive. He states, "There isn't another city like Kolkata anywhere in the world. In the heart of it, I find innumerable themes, subjects." He does not merely portray reality as a 'matter of fact' and his presentation of reality often has dream-like elements. Regarding technique, Subhaprasanna boasts a precise, finely executed style that yields an unmistakable visual intensity. He works comfortably in various media, including oil on canvas, charcoal, and mixed media.

He explains his thought process and philosophy as a painter, he notes: "What every creator wishes to achieve is a universal appeal. There should be no language problem while judging the merits of a painting. One should go beyond themes, beyond words. There can be no clear-cut definition for feelings, nor should you wish to seek any logical explanation."

Subhaprasanna's series of paintings, Icons and Illusions, marked a creative breakthrough for the artist in a number of ways. Whereas he had been known in the past as an urban artist with subject matter that reflected the byways, alleyways, birds, and people of his native Kolkata, in this series he relished more in divinities and flowers. The iconic figures of Krishna, Radha, and Ganesha that found lyrical expression in the Icons series are modern representations and sophisticated idealizations of the same images in the popular media.

His works have been exhibited extensively in India and internationally in the United States, Bangladesh, Singapore, France, Switzerland, and Germany. He has been recipient of numerous awards.

== Political career ==
Since 2007, after his painting career was down, Shuvaprasanna's involvement in politics of West Bengal state increased. Since then he has been closely associated with Trinamool Congress leader Mamata Banerjee. Before the 2011 assembly election, he became a prominent face to campaign for parivartan. In recognition to his support, the then Railway Minister Mamata Banerjee created a new department in the railway ministry and made him chairperson of that department. He was given an honorarium of Rs. 8,000 per month. He has been termed as 'key advisor' to Ms Banerjee by media. Of late he has been trying to launch a channel of his own to promote his ideas and politics. However, this has run into bad weather as he has been caught using the name of Ms. Banerjee and raising funds in the name of her. Mamata trying to protect her name has started distancing herself from the painter. Recently,
