= Nishachar =

- নিশাচর
- Directed by: Bhupen Roy
- Screenplay by: Bhupen Roy
- Produced by: Ashok Dasgupta
- Starring: Asit Baran; Bikash Roy; Sombhu Mitra; Manju Dey
- Cinematography: Nani Das
- Edited by: Ardhendu Chatterjee
- Music by: Kalipada Sen
- Color process: Black and white
- Production company: Guptashri Productions
- Release date: 16 July 1971
- Running time: 107 minutes
- Country: India
- Language: Bengali

Nishachar is a Bengali thriller drama film directed by Bhupen Roy and produced by Ashok Dasgupta. The film stares Asit Baran, Bikash Roy and Manju Dey in lead roles. It was released on 16 July 1971 under the banner of Mandira Films. This is the last film of actor Sombhu Mitra.

== Plot ==
The film revolves around a mysterious person Nishachar, who involves with smuggling and murder. Minakshi, a young rich lady receives threat calls from mysterious person. Police suspect the unknown culprit is Nishachar, but someone close of Minakshi is behind the plot.

== Cast ==
- Asit Baran
- Bikash Roy
- Sombhu Mitra
- Haradhan Banerjee
- Manju Dey
- Sumita Sanyal as Minakshi
- Gyanesh Mukherjee
- Kamu Mukherjee
- Dilip Roy
- Mani Srimani
- Smita Majumdar
- Geetali Roy
- Biren Chatterjee
- Dhiraj Das
- Lilabati Karali
