= Aamar Bhuvan =

2002 Indian film by Mrinal Sen

- DVD cover
- Directed by: Mrinal Sen
- Written by: Mrinal Sen; Afsar Amed
- Story by: Based on Dhanjyotsna by Afsar Amed
- Starring: Nandita Das; Kaushik Sen; Bibhas Chakraborty; Arun Mukherjee
- Cinematography: Avik Mukhopadhyay
- Music by: Debojyoti Mishra
- Release date: 11 October 2002
- Running time: 107 minutes
- Country: India
- Language: Bengali

Aamar Bhuvan is a 2002 Bengali film directed by Mrinal Sen. The film portrays a community in India where people coexist peacefully and share love, despite the widespread hatred and violence affecting the rest of the country. Mrinal Sen received the Best Director Award at the Cairo Film Festival in 2002 for this film. The screenplay is adapted from the novel Dhanjyotsna by Afsar Amed.

== Plot ==
The story revolves around Sakhina and Nur, who have divorced. Sakhina has since remarried Meher, a man who loves her but struggles to support her and their three children. Nur, who had moved to the Middle East, returns as a wealthy man and has also remarried. As cousins, Nur attempts to assist Meher and Sakhina by offering employment and financial support. However, tension arises when Nur returns a valuable nose-ring to Sakhina. The nose-ring, which Nur had given Sakhina during their marriage and which Meher had pawned for money, causes Sakhina to feel insulted and hurt.

== Cast ==
- Nandita Das as Sakhina
- Kaushik Sen as Meher
- Saswata Chatterjee as Nur
- Bibhas Chakraborty
- Arun Mukherjee
- Shubhannita Guha as Saira

== Awards ==
=== Cairo International film festival ===
- Best director: Mrinal Sen (won)
- Best actress: Nandita Das (won)
- Golden pyramid (nominated)

=== In India ===
- Anandalok Award: Best Male Playback Singer for Srikanta Acharya in 2003
