= Parshuramer Kuthar =

- DVD cover for Parshuramer Kuthar
- Directed by: Nabyendu Chatterjee
- Written by: Subodh Ghosh
- Starring: Asit Bandopadhyay; Sreelekha Mukherji; Arun Mukhopadhyay; Ranajit Chakraborty
- Release date: 1989
- Country: India
- Language: Bangla

Parshuramer Kuthar is a 1989 Bengali film by Nabyendu Chatterjee. The lead actress, Sreelekha Mukherji, won the National Film Award for Best Actress for her role. The story was written by author Subodh Ghosh.

== Synopsis ==
The film is about Lakkhi (Sreelekha Mukherji), a Bengali village woman who was expecting her first baby when her husband fell from a roof and remained crippled. She lost her baby from the shock, and as a meagre compensation, is offered work as a wet-nurse in middle-class families where presumably women have other things to do than feed their children. Perhaps because of the social difference, she is in no position to resist the advances from the "gentlemen" who take advantage of her presence, and she soon finds herself caught in a system whereby if she wants to bring some cash home and feed an ailing husband, she needs to continue to breast-feed. This can only be achieved if she delivers again, and so she does. But she has no children. One day, before important elections, in addition to a pre-election street-cleaning programme, she is asked to leave town because she's a prostitute. She tries to meet the "gentlemen" who used to be pleased with her in more than one way, but all of them reject her now that the word "prostitute" has been pronounced publicly. She ends up a pensioner in the brothel and the last scene is that of one young man coming to look at her, a young man whom she had lovingly suckled when he was a baby.

== Cast ==
- Sreelekha Mukherji as Lakkhi
- Asit Bandopadhyay

== Awards ==
Year	Award	Category	Recipient(s)	Result	Ref.
1990	National Film Awards (India)	Silver Lotus Award for Best Actress	Sreelekha Mukherji	Won	
1990	National Film Awards (India)	Silver Lotus Award for Second Best Feature Film	Parshuramer Kuthar	Won	
