= Ali Ahmed Hussain Khan =

- আলী আহমেদ হুসেন খান
- Born: March 21, 1939; Calcutta, Bengal presidency, British India
- Died: March 16, 2016 (aged 76); Kolkata, West Bengal, India
- Occupation: Shehnai specialist
- Children: 5 sons and 5 daughters
- Father: Ali Jan Khan
- Awards: Sangeet Natak Akademi Award (2009); Banga Bibhushan (2012)

Ali Ahmed Hussain Khan (21 March 1939 – 16 March 2016) was a shehnai specialist from India.

== Early life ==
Ali Ahmed Hussain Khan was born on 21 March 1939 in Kolkata. His grandfather Wazir Ali Khan was the first to demonstrate Indian classical music on shehnai at Buckingham Palace. His father Ali Jan Khan and uncle Nazir Hussain Khan and Imdad Hussain Khan of Benares were also renowned shehnai specialists.

== Career ==
He taught how to play the instrument, shehnai, at Sangeet Research Academy, Calcutta beginning in 1974. He was regularly featured on All India Radio and Indian Television. He holds the distinction of composing the signature tune for Indian Television with Pandit Ravi Shankar in 1973. He played jugalbandhi both commercially and in live performances with artists such as Vilayat Khan, Pandit Manilal Nag on sitar, V. G. Jog on violin and Munawar Ali Khan with vocals.

== Concerts ==
Ali Ahmed traveled within India and abroad. His concert tours included countries like the United Kingdom, Germany, Switzerland, the Netherlands, France, Belgium, Russia, Tunisia, Thailand, Singapore, Indonesia and the Philippines over a span of twenty years. On several occasions, he has been invited/sponsored by governments and/or music festivals. He performed a duet with pianist Peter Michael Hamel at the Indo-German Festival. He also participated in the 'Music Festival Raag-Mala' in the U.S. and Canada in 1994.

== Awards ==
- Sangeet Natak Akademi Award in 2009
- Top grade Artist of All India Radio
- All Bengal Music Conference (award & gold medal)
- Gavati Devi Music(gold medal)
- Tansen Samarooh, gold Medal awarded by M. Farooque in Bihar Sharif
- Indian Classical Music Circle of Austin held at Austin, Texas, USA, awarded him certificate of Excellence
- Bishwa Banga Sammelan Award given by the Honourable Speaker of the Parliament Of India Somnath Chatterjee
- Awarded by the Government Of Port Blair
- Awarded by Indian Community held at Bangdung, Indonesia
- Sruti Nandan (Kolkata), Binapani Sanskrutika Anusthan (Cuttack)
- Bankim Kumar Pal Memorial Music Conference
- Indian Council For Cultural Relations & Indian Museum presented Parvati C.14 Cent A.D at Indian Independence Kingdom National first time in City of Joy Kolkata in M.V Minerva Ship by the Govt Of Indian Tourist Office
- Diploma from The State Committee of Yerevan (Armenia).
- Banga Bibhushan Award in 2012

== Death ==
Ali Ahmed Hussain Khan died on 16 March 2016 due to kidney-related problems in Kolkata at age 77. Among the survivors are five sons and five daughters.
