= Krishan Chander =

Indian writer

Krishan Chander Chopra
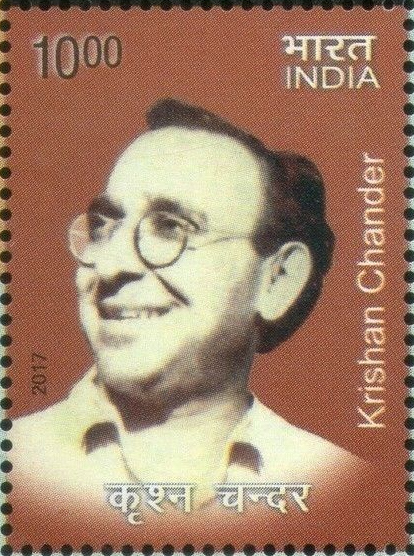
- Krishan Chander on a 2017 stamp of India
- Born: 23 November 1914; Bharatpur, Rajputana, British India (now in Rajasthan, India)
- Died: 8 March 1977 (aged 62); Bombay, Maharashtra, India
- Education: Forman Christian College, Lahore
- Occupation: Writer
- Spouses: Vidyawati Chopra and Salma Siddiqui

Krishan Chander (23 November 1914 – 8 March 1977) was an Indian Urdu and Hindi writer of short stories and novels. Some of his works have also been translated into English. He was a prolific writer, penning over 20 novels, 30 collections of short stories and scores of radio plays in Urdu, and later, after partition in 1947, took to writing in Hindi as well. He also wrote screen-plays for Bollywood movies to supplement his meagre income as an author of satirical stories. Krishan Chander's novels (including the classic: Ek Gadhe Ki Sarguzasht, transl. 'Autobiography of a Donkey') have been translated into over 16 Indian languages and some foreign languages, including English.

His short story "Annadata" (transl. The Giver of Grain – an obsequious appellation used by Indian peasants for their feudal land-owners), was made into the film Dharti Ke Lal (1946) by Khwaja Ahmad Abbas – which led to his being offered work regularly as a screenwriter by Bollywood, including such popular hits as Mamta (1966) and Sharafat (1970). He wrote his film scripts in Urdu.

== Early life and education ==
Krishan Chander was born in Bharatpur, Rajasthan where his father worked as a doctor. The family originally belonged to Wazirabad District Gujranwala, of undivided Punjab, India. Chander spent his childhood in Poonch, in the state of Jammu and Kashmir, where his father worked as the physician of Maharaja Poonch. His novel Shikast (Defeat) is related to Kashmir's partition. Mitti Ke Sanam, one of his most popular novels, is about the childhood memories of a young boy who lived with his parents in Kashmir. His another memorable novel is "Gaddar", which is about the partition of India and Pakistan in 1947. In this novel, he brilliantly picturised the sufferings of the people during that time through a selfish young man's feelings, who himself was a gaddar (betrayer). His short stories are the stories of Kashmiri villages, as well as those of displaced expatriates and rootless urban man. He used Pahari (dialect of people living in Poonch) words while writing in Urdu.

In the 1930s, he studied at Forman Christian College, Lahore and edited the English section of the college house magazine, and was at that time interested in English writings. As the then editor of the Urdu section of the magazine, Mehr Lal Soni Zia Fatehabadi was instrumental to his career in having got published, in the year 1932, Chander's first Urdu short story, "Sadhu".

== Career ==
His literary masterpieces on the Bengal famine and the savagery and barbarism that took place at the time of the partition of India in 1947 are some of the finest specimens of modern Urdu literature, but at other times, too, he continued relentlessly to critique the abuse of power, poverty and the suffering of the wretched of the earth; but above all he never stopped protesting casteism, fanaticism, communal violence and terror. He was a humanist and a cosmopolitan.

== Books written by Krishan Chander ==
He has been described as the "author of more than 100 books including novels, collections of short stories, plays, fantasies, satires, parodies, reportages, film-scripts and books for children", which include:

Novels:

1. Jamun Ka Peid
2. Shikast
3. Jab Khet Jagay
4. Toofaan Ki KaliyaaN
5. Dil Ki Waadiyaan So GayiN
6. Darwaaze Khol Do
7. Aasmaan Roushan Hai
8. Bavan Patte
9. Ek Gadhe Ki Sarguzasht (The Life Story a Donkey)
10. Ek Aurat Hazaar Deewanay
11. Ghaddaar
12. Jab Khet Jage
13. Sarak Wapas Jaati Hai
14. Dadar Pul Ke Neechay
15. Barf Ke Phool
16. Borban Club
17. Meri Yaadon Ke Chinaar
18. Gadhay Ki Wapasi
19. Chandi Ka Ghaao
20. Ek Gadha Nefa Mein
21. Hong Kong Ki Haseena
22. Mitti Ke Sanam
23. Zar Gaon Ki Raani
24. Ek Voilon Samundar Ke Kinare
25. Dard Ki Nahar
26. London Ke Saat Rang
27. Kaghaz Ki Naao
28. Filmi Qaaida
29. Panch Loafer (1966)
30. Panch Loafer Ek Heroine
31. Ganga Bahe Na Raat
32. Dusri Barfbari Se Pahlay
33. Gwalior Ka Hajjam
34. Bambai Ki Shaam
35. Chanda Ki Chandni
36. Ek Karor Ki Botal
37. Maharani
38. Pyar Ek Khushbu
39. Masheenon Ka Shahr
40. Carnival
41. Aayine Akelay Hain
42. Chanbal Ki Chanbeli
43. Uska Badan Mera Chaman
44. Muhabbat Bhi Qayamat Bhi
45. Sone Ka Sansaar
46. SapnoN Ki Waadi
47. Aadha Raasta
48. Honolulu Ka Rajkumar
49. Sapnon Ki Rahguzarein
50. Footpath Ke Farishtay
51. Aadhe Safar Ki Poori Kahani

Short Story Collections:

1. Tilism E Khayal
2. Ekk Tawaef Ka Khat
3. Nazaray
4. Hawai Qilay
5. Ghunghat Mein Gori Jalay
6. Tootay Hue Taaray
7. Zindagi Ke Mor Par
8. Naghmay Ki Maut
9. Purane Khuda
10. Ann Daata
11. Teen Ghunday
12. Hum Wahshi Hain
13. Ajanta Se Aagay
14. Ek Girja Ek Khandaq
15. Samunder Door Hai
16. Shikast Ke Baad
17. Naye Ghulam
18. Main Intezaar Karunga
19. Mazaahiya Afsaanay
20. Ek Rupiya Ek Phool
21. Eucalyptus Ki Daali
22. Hydrogen Bomb Ke Baad
23. Naye Afsaanay (1943)
24. Kaab Ka Kafan
25. Dil Kisi Ka Dost Nahi (1959)
26. Muskuraane Waaliyan
27. Krishn Chander Ke Afsaanay
28. Sapnon Ka Qaidi
29. Miss Nanital
30. DaswaaN Pul (1964)
31. Gulshan Gulshan Dhundha Tujhko
32. Aadhe Ghante Ka Khuda
33. Uljhi Larki Kaalay Baal (1970)
34. Kaloo Bhangi

== Filmography ==
- Dharti Ke Lal (1946) — story
- Andolan (1951) — screenplay and story
- Tamasha (1952) — dialogue
- Dev Anand in Goa (1955) — screenplay and dialogue
- Do Phool (1958) — dialogue
- Delhi Junction (1960) — dialogue
- Mamta (1966) — dialogues
- Sharafat (1970) — screenplay and dialogue
- Do Chor (1972) — dialogue
- Manchali (1973) — dialogue
- Hamrahi (1974) — story and dialogue writer
- Ram Bharose (1977) — dialogue

== Personal life and legacy ==
Krishan Chander Chopra had married twice. His first wife was Vidyawati Chopra, a lady from a decent family belonging to his own Khatri community, and the match was arranged by their families in the usual Indian way. They had three children together, two daughters and one son.

Chander later took a second wife, and he was her second husband. This was a divorced Muslim woman, Salma Siddiqui, daughter of Rasheed Ahmed Siddiqi, an Urdu academic. Siddiqui was the mother of a son born of her earlier marriage, and the boy was raised in Chander's household. No children were born of the relationship between Chander and Siddiqui.

Krishan Chander died working at his desk in Mumbai on 8 March 1977. He had just started to write a satirical essay entitled Adab baray-e-Batakh (Literature for a duck), and wrote just one line Noorani ko bachpan hi se paltoo janwaron ka shauq tha. Kabootar, bandar, rang barangi chiriyaan… (since childhood Noorani was fond of pet animals such as pigeons, monkeys, multi-coloured birds…). Before he could complete the sentence, he succumbed to a massive heart attack.

A Fountain Park in the town of Poonch in Jammu and Kashmir has been renamed Krishan Chander Park, Poonch in his memory. His statue has also been erected in the middle of that garden.
