= Afsar Amed =

Indian writer (1959–2018)

- Born: 5 April 1959; Howrah District, West Bengal, India
- Died: 4 August 2018 (aged 59); Kolkata, West Bengal, India
- Education: University of Calcutta
- Occupation: Writer

Afsar Amed (also written as Afsar Ahmed, 5 April 1959 – 4 August 2018) was an Indian Bengali writer. He wrote 27 novels and 24 other books.

== Early life and education ==
Amed was born on 5 April 1959. He pursued his post graduate education from University of Calcutta in Bangla.

== Career ==
During Amed's early life he wrote mainly poems but later he began to write prose. His writing Bangali Musalmaner Biyer Gan was published in Porichoy in 1978. His first novel Ghor Gerosti was published in 1980. His writings were published in Porichoy, Kalantor, Baromas, Saroswato. Besides writing he also worked in literary magazine Protikshon for some years. He worked in Paschimbanga Bangla Akademi too.

Amed's book Bibir Mithya Talaq O Talaqer Bibi Ebong Holud Pakhir Kissa was in the school curriculum in Assam. Mrinal Sen directed Aamar Bhuban was based on his novel Dhan Jyotsna. This film was his last direction. A film titled Raat Koto Holo (2011) directed by Sandeep Chattopadhyay (Chatterjee), produced by Satyajit Ray Film and Television Institute (SRFTI), was based on his novel Hatyar Promad Jani.

Amed also translated books of other languages into Bangla. He and Kalim Hazique translated Abdus Samad's Urdu novel Do Gaz Zamin into Bangla titled Sare Tin Hat Bhumi. He also translated a Sindhi book of Hari Motwani into Bangla. The title of the translated book was Ashroy.

== Selected bibliography ==
=== Novels ===
- Ghor Gerosti
- Sanu Alir Nijer Jomi
- Atmoporichoy
- Byatha Khuje Ana
- Swapnosomvash
- Khondo Bikhondo
- Dhanjyotsna
- Bibir Mithya Talaq O Talaqer Bibi Ebong Holud Pakhir Kissa
- Sei Nikhoj Manushta
- Dwitiyo Bibi
- Ek Ashchorjo Boshikoron Kissa
- Hotyar Promad Jani
- Metiaburuze Kissa
- Ek Ghorsowar Kissa
- Hire Vikharini O Sundori Romoni Kissa

=== Translations ===
- Sare Tin Hat Bhumi
- Ashroy

== Screen adaptations ==
- Mrinal Sen directed Aamar Bhuban (2002) was based on his novel Dhan Jyotsna.
- Raat Koto Holo (2011) directed by Sandeep Chattopadhyay (Chatterjee), produced by Satyajit Ray Film and Television Institute (SRFTI), was based on his novel Hatyar Promad Jani.

== Awards and recognition ==
- Somen Chanda Puraskar from Paschimbanga Bangla Akademi in 1998. He and Kalim Hazique translated Abdus Samad's Urdu novel Do Gaz Zamin into Bengali titled Sare Tin Hat Bhumi.
- Sahitya Akademi Translation Prize for this work in 2000.
- Bankim Puraskar in 2009.
- Sahitya Akademi Award in 2017 for his novel Sei Nikhoj Manushta.

== Death ==
Amed died on 4 August 2018 at the age of 59.
