= Shilpi =

1994 Indian Bengali film

- Poster
- Directed by: Nabyendu Chatterjee
- Written by: Manik Bandopadhyay
- Starring: Anjan Dutt; Asit Bandopadhyay; Meghnad Bhattacharya; Rita Dutta Chakraborty; Srilekha Mukhopadhyay
- Music by: Nikhil Chattopadhyay
- Release date: 1994
- Country: India
- Language: Bengali

Shilpi (transl. The Artist) is a 1994 Bengali film. The film was directed by Nabyendu Chatterjee and produced by National Film Development Corporation of India.

== Plot ==
A man, who works at the house of Roy Bahadur, falls in love with his daughter. However, Roy Bahadur wants his daughter to marry his friend's son.

== Cast ==
- Anjan Dutt
- Asit Bandopadhyay
- Meghnad Bhattacharya
- Rita Dutta Chakraborty
- Srilekha Mukhopadhyay

== Awards ==
- 1995 Bengal Film Journalists' Association Awards Best actor: Anjan Dutt

== See also ==
- Akaler Sandhane
