= Suresh Dutta =

Indian puppet artist

- Born: 1930; Faridpur, East Bengal, British India
- Died: 1 October 2024 (aged 93–94); Kolkata, West Bengal, India
- Occupation: Puppet artist
- Known for: Puppet theatre
- Spouse: Late Smt.Triptikana Dutta
- Parent(s): Late Sashi Bhusan Dutta and Late Sishubala Dutta.
- Awards: Sangeet Natak Academy award in 1986[[Padma Shri in 2009]]

Suresh Dutta is an Indian puppet artist, theatre personality and the founder of Calcutta Puppet Theatre, a Kolkata-based theatre group dedicated to puppetry. Born in Faridpur, in the undivided Bengal of the British India, he trained art under Phani Bhushan, a Jatra exponent, and Kathakali under Balakrishna Menon. He has also learnt fusion style of danceform from maestro Uday Shankar. He also learnt Bharatanatyam and Manipuri before moving to Russia, under a scholarship in 1962, to train in puppetry under the Russian puppeteer, Sergey Obraztsov.

Returning to India in 1963, he joined the Children's Little Theatre, under the behest of Balakrishna Menon, as the assistant dance director, where he also designed costumes and sets. A decade later, he founded his own puppet theatre group, Calcutta Puppet Theatre, along with his wife, Devi, and a few like-minded artists. The group staged several shows, beginning with the Alladin, followed by Ramayana, Sita, Gulabo aar Sitabo and Notun Jeebon, totaling over 3,000 shows. He received the Sangeet Natak Akademi Award in 1987. The Government of India awarded him the fourth highest civilian honour of the Padma Shri, in 2009, for his contributions to puppetry.

== See also ==
- Calcutta Puppet Theatre
