= Sharafat =

- Film poster
- शराफत
- Directed by: Asit Sen
- Screenplay by: Nabendu Ghosh; Krishan Chander (dialogue)
- Story by: Mahesh Kaul
- Produced by: Madan Mohla
- Starring: Ashok Kumar; Dharmendra; Hema Malini
- Cinematography: Madan Sinha
- Edited by: Lachhmandass
- Music by: Laxmikant–Pyarelal
- Production company: Famous Cine Studios
- Distributed by: Seven Arts Films
- Release date: 31 July 1970
- Running time: 2 hours
- Country: India
- Language: Hindi

Sharafat is a 1970 Hindi romantic drama film, directed by Asit Sen, starring Ashok Kumar, Dharmendra, Hema Malini in lead roles. Hema Malini plays the role of a feisty tawaif(courtesan) Chanda in search of her father, in this satire about society's hypocritical moral standards. The screenplay was written by Nabendu Ghosh, while the dialogues were by Hindi satirist Krishan Chander (author of such dark classics of Black Humor & Satire as Ek Gadhe Ki Aatmkatha (An Autobiography Of A Donkey).

The film with music by Laxmikant–Pyarelal and lyrics by Anand Bakshi, was also noted for its mujra dance song, Sharafat Chhor Di sung by Lata Mangeshkar, which reached 9th position on the Binaca Geetmala annual list 1970.

== Cast ==
- Ashok Kumar as Jagatram
- Dharmendra as Rajesh
- Hema Malini as Chandni
- Sonia Sahni as Rekha
- Jagdeep as Bhola
- Shabnam as Rani
- Abhi Bhattacharya as Gopinath
- Kanhaiyalal as Pratapchand
- D.K. Sapru as Jamnaprasad
- Jankidas as Jeweller
- Tun Tun as Champakali
- Mohan Choti as Student
- Paro Devi as Kesarbai
- Raj Kishore as student
- Birbal as student
- Purnima as Chandni's Mother
- Roopesh Kumar as Arun
- Sunder as Gopal
- Brahma Bhardwaj as Principal
- Keshav Rana as Ruffian at the brothel

== Soundtrack ==
The film had music by Laxmikant–Pyarelal and lyrics by Anand Bakshi.

Song	Singer
"Sharafat Chhod Di Maine"	Lata Mangeshkar
"Mera Rasta Rok Rahe Hai"	Lata Mangeshkar
"O Raja Jani, O Ho Raja Jani"	Lata Mangeshkar
"Jeevandaata Jagatpita Tum"	Lata Mangeshkar
"Pehle Na Dekha Jaise Kisine"	Lata Mangeshkar
"Ek Din Aapko Yaad Kiye Magar"	Asha Bhosle
