= Shipra Bhattacharya =

Indian artist

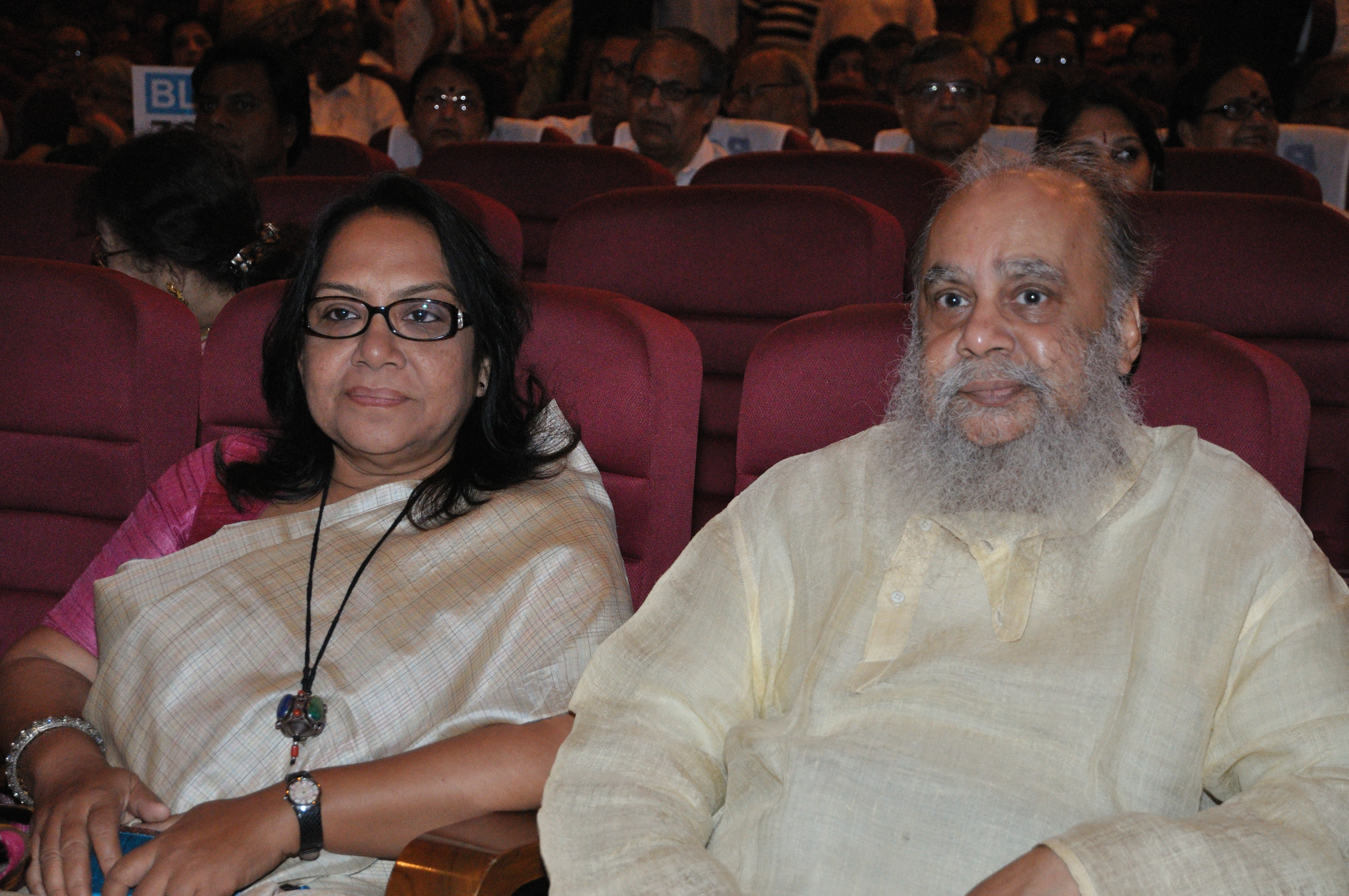
Shipra Bhattacharya (left), with her husband, Subhaprasanna

Shipra Bhattacharya (born 1954) is an Indian artist from Kolkata, known for her figurative paintings of women in domestic, urban, and natural environments. Her work has been exhibited in India and internationally.

== Life ==
Bhattacharya was born in Kolkata and earned a bachelor's degree in science from Calcutta University, before studying art at the Government College of Art and Craft in Kolkata. She continued her graduate education in art at the College of Visual Arts in Calcutta University, under the guidance of the artist Subhaprasanna, later marrying him.

== Career and work ==
Bhattacharya began exhibiting her work in 1981. Her work has since been exhibited in India, including at the Habitat Center in Delhi, the Tagore Art Gallery in Kolkata, and the Birla Academy of Art & Culture. Internationally, her work has been widely exhibited individually and in groups.

Bhattacharya's early work used Indian techniques of charcoal and tempera, focusing on themes relating to women in public life, and particularly, the colors and images of Bengali markets. Her later work is primarily in oil on canvas, drawing from historical and mythical themes. Describing Bhattacharya's work, South Asian art historian Marcella Sirhandi writes that she draws inspiration from the traditions of Indian miniature paintings, drawing from contemporary middle-class lived experiences of women. Art critic and author Manasi Majumdar has praised Bhattacharya's depiction of femininity in "...images of celebration and fulfillment," particularly noting her focus on the internal lives of her subjects. In 2006, commenting on an exhibition of Bhattacharya's works in Palo Alto, California, curator Sushma Bahl wrote that her work was "...quiet, content and non-provocative," depicting women at ease and independent of the male gaze.

Her art has also been used in book covers, including on an edition of Bani Basu's Dark Afternoons and a volume of poetry by Jibananda Das. In recent publications, Bhattacharya's work has been described as under-appreciated, with Tanya and Carol Goyal noting in Business World that Bhattacharya and other women artists were not included in sales rankings of Indian artists despite national fame, because of a lack of global attention to their work, and stating, "Shipra Bhattacharya currently sells at prices well below her talent. Buy now, reap later." Along with her husband, Subhaprasanna, Bhattacharya has also established the Arts Acre, a museum for modern art from the state of West Bengal.
