= Usha Ganguly =

Indian theatre director, actress, and activist (1945–2020)

- Born: 1945; Jodhpur, Rajasthan
- Died: April 23, 2020 (aged 74–75); Kolkata, West Bengal, India
- Occupations: theatre director, actor, activist
- Years active: 1970–2020
- Known for: Founder-director Rangakarmee theatre group (1976)

Usha Ganguli (1945 – 23 April 2020) was an Indian theatre director-actor and activist, most known for her work in Hindi theatre in Kolkata in the 1970s and 1980s. She founded Rangakarmee theatre group in 1976, known for its productions like Mahabhoj, Rudali, Court Martial, and Antaryatra. Apart from thespian Shyamanand Jalan of Padatik (established 1972), she was the only other theatre director to practise Hindi theatre in Kolkata, which is largely Bengali speaking.

She was awarded the Sangeet Natak Akademi Award for Direction, given by the Sangeet Natak Akademi, India's National Academy of Music, Dance & Drama in 1998. She was also honoured by the West Bengal Government as the best actress for the play Gudia Ghar.

== Early life and education ==
Born in Jodhpur, Rajasthan, in 1930, into a family from the village of Nerva in Uttar Pradesh, Usha Ganguly learnt Bharatanatyam dance and later moved to Kolkata, where she studied at Shri Shikshayatan College, Kolkata and did her master's degree in Hindi literature.

== Career ==
Ganguly began her career as a teacher at Bhowanipur Education Society College, Calcutta, an undergraduate college affiliated with the University of Calcutta, in 1970. Also in the same year, she started acting with Sangit Kala Mandir and also started work for her first play Mitti Ki Gadi (based on Mrichchakatikam by Shudrak) (1970), where she played the role of Vasantsena. She continued teaching as a Hindi Lecturer at Bhowanipur Education Society College, until her retirement in 2008 and practised theatre all the while.

She formed a theatre group, Rangakarmee, in January 1976. Initially, since she was trained as a dancer, the group invited outside directors, like M.K. Raina, who directed Mother, Tripti Mitra directed Gudia Ghar, an adaptation of Ibsen's A Doll's House, besides Rudra Prasad Sengupta and Bibhash Chakravorty, before she started directing herself, having trained under Tripti Mitra and Mrinal Sen.

Ganguly started directing in the 1980s and soon her energetic style and disciplined ensemble work with young, large casts brought a resurgence of Hindi theatre in the city. Her important productions included Mahabhoj (Great Feast) in 1984, based on Mannu Bhandari novel, Ratnakar Matkari's Lokkatha (Folktale) in 1987, Holi by playwright Mahesh Elkunchwar in 1989, and Rudali (1992), her own dramatised version of a story by Mahashweta Devi, Himmat Mai, an adaptation of Brecht's Mother Courage and notably Court Martial written by playwright Swadesh Deepak. She wrote a play Kashinama (2003), based on a story, Kaane Kaun Kumati Lagi from the Kashinath Singh's classic work, Kashi Ka Assi and an original play Khoj.

She also worked on the script of Raincoat (2004) a Hindi film based on O Henry's The Gift of the Magi, directed by Rituparno Ghosh.

In the coming years, she also translated and adapted plays into Hindi. Rangakarmee started its education wing in the 1990s, today it regularly takes its repertoire on tours across India and undertakes education extension activities in theatre with underprivileged people.

In 2005, Rangkarmee was the only Indian theatre group to perform at the Theatre der Welt Festival in Stuttgart, Germany. It staged the play Rudali at "Punj Pani festival" at Lahore in 2006. The group staged its first multilingual production, Bhor about the minds of inmates of a drug rehab centre in August 2010.

== Plays ==
- Mahabhoj (The Great Feast) (1984)
- Lok Katha (Folk Tale) (1987)
- Holi (1989)
- Court Martial (1991)
- Rudali (The Mourner) (1992)
- Himmat Mai (Mother Courage) (1998)
- Mukti (1999)
- Shobhayatra (2000)
- Kashinama (2003)
- Chandalika
- Sarhad Par Manto
- Manasi (in Bengali) (2011)

== Works ==
- Rudali (play based on Mahashweta Devi's story), Radhakrishna Prakashan, 2004. ISBN 81-7119-767-1.
- Antarmahal.
