= Shaoli Mitra =

Bengali actress (c.1948–2022)

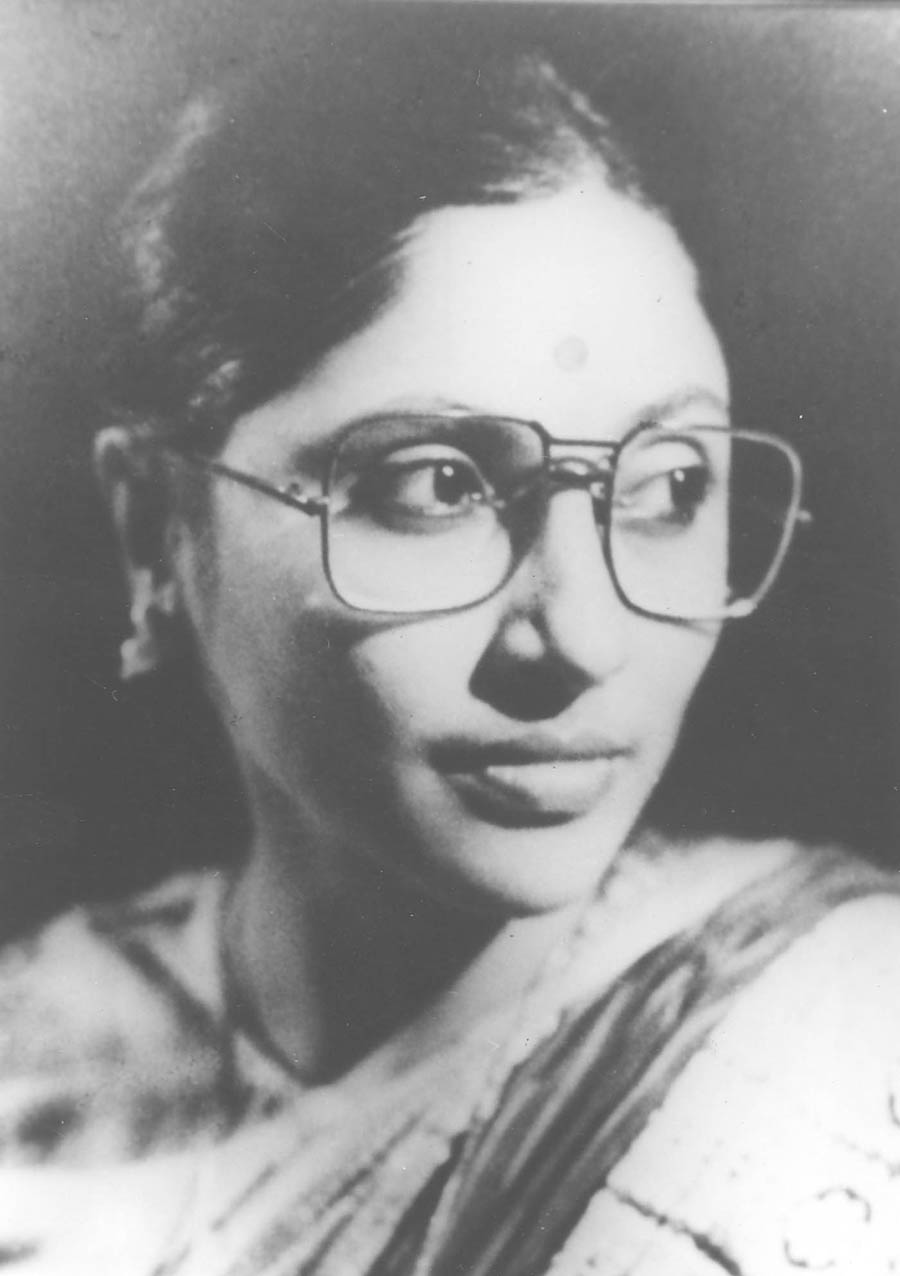
- Mitra in October 2004
- Born: c. 1948; West Bengal, India
- Died: 16 January 2022 (aged 73); Kolkata, West Bengal, India
- Occupation: Actress
- Known for: Jukti Takko Aar Gappo
- Parent(s): Sombhu Mitra, Tripti Mitra
- Awards: Padma Shri (2009); Banga Bibhushan (2012)

Shaoli Mitra (alternatively spelt as Shaonli Mitra (Bengali: শাঁওলি মিত্র); c. 1948 – 16 January 2022) was an Indian Bengali theatre and film actress, director, and playwright. She played the role of Bangabala in Ritwik Ghatak's Jukti Takko Aar Gappo. She is the daughter of Sombhu Mitra and Tripti Mitra, who were also theatre personalities.

== Career ==
Mitra was involved in drama from her childhood under the guidance of her parents Sombhu Mitra and Tripti Mitra. She acted in the play Dakghar in the role of Amal. Later she also formed her own theatre group. In 2011, she became the chairperson of Rabindra Shardhoshato Janmabarsha Udjapon Samiti. She worked with the Bohurupee productions. She also established the theatre group "Pancham Baidik" which is pioneer for producing widely acclaimed plays on women's emancipation.

== Personal life and death ==
Mitra married to bahurupi's Kaliprasad Ghosh in July 1977. Mitra died of heart ailments on 16 January 2022 at the age of 73 at her home in South Kolkata.

=== Films ===
- Jukti Takko Aar Gappo (Character name Bongobala)

=== Plays ===
- Bitata Bitangsha
- Nathabati Anathabat
- Putulkhela
- Ekti Rajnaitik Hotya
- Hajabaralo
- Katha Amritasaman
- Lankadahan
- Chandali
- Pagla ghorha
- Pakhi
- Galileo r Jeeban
- Daakghar
- Jodi Aar ek Baar
- As Sita in Sitakatha

=== Books ===
- Five Lords, Yet None a Protector & Words Sweet & Timeless
- Gononatya, Nobonatya, Sotnatya O Sombhu Mitra

== Awards ==
- Sangeet Natak Akademi Award in 2003 for acting in Bengali theatre
- Banga Bibhushan in 2012 for lifetime achievement in theatre
- Padma Shri in 2009 in Arts.
