= Nabyendu Chatterjee =

Indian Bengali and Hindi film director and producer

Nabyendu Chatterjee (21 November 1937 – 14 January 2009) was an Indian Bengali and Hindi film director and producer. A director of twelve feature films and three documentaries, Nabyendu has curved out a sure niche for him in the field of serious and useful cinema of India.

He died at the age of 71 after a massive heart attack in his North Kolkata residence in 2009 leaving behind his wife, Protima Chatterjee; son, Naibedya and grandchildren Niravhra and Nairwita.

== Career ==
Nabyendu Chatterjee started his career as an actor in 1962 but soon turned into the direction of films. He worked with Bengali director Aravind Mukherjee as an assistant. In his career, he was known as independent, off beat film maker with unparallel and art films. His choice of literary stories to be translated into film scripts by himself.

His films such as Aaj Kaal Parsur Golpo, Sarisreep, Chopper, Sanskar, Atmaja, Sauda, Shilpi, Parasuramer Kuther, Ranur Pratham Bhaag and Mansur Mian-r Ghora offers glimpses into his directorial directorial talent engaged in exploring diverse social, political and humane issues. He has to his credit a bunch of National Awards. Shilpi, one of his films screened at the 25th International Film Festival of India(IFFI) at Calcutta won two international awards. One at the World Television Film Festival in Japan and the other at the 14th Festival International du film d' Amiens held in France.

== Filmography ==
Film	Year	Notes
Adwitiya	1967	Playback singers: Hemanta Mukhopadhyay, Lata Mangeshkar, Asha Bhonsle and Manna Dey. Featuring Madhabi Mukherjee, Sarbendra, Ajitesh Banerjee, Bikash Roy, Dilip Roy and Lily Chakraborty.
Chitthi	1972	Music: Shyamal Mitra. Featuring Sandhya Roy, Samit Bhanja, Ajitesh Banerjee, Ashim Chakraborty, Nivanani Devi, Rabi Ghosh, Anuva Gupta, Jahar Roy and Lalita Chatterjee. Lyrics: Gouriprasanna Mazumder.
Ranur Pratham Bhag	1973	Music: Nikhil Chattopadhyay. Lyrics: D. L. Roy. Featuring Ajitesh Banerjee, Neera Malya, Bankim Ghosh, Geeta Dey, Nivanani Devi and Dwiju Bhowal.
Aaj Kal Parshur Galpo	1981	Music: Nikhil Chattopadhyay. Playback singer: Haimanti Shukla. Featuring Mahua Roychowdhury, Dipankar Dey, Mamata Chattopadhyay, Subrata Sen Sharma and Niranjan Roy.
Chopper	1985	Featuring Joy Banerjee, Sreela Majumder, Karuna Kanta Bhattacharya, Mrinal Basu Chowdhury, Pradip Mukherjee, Sova Sen and Santana Basu.
Sarisreep	1987	Featuring Dhritiman Chatterjee and Sumitra Mukherjee.
Parshuramer Kuthar	1989	Featuring Sreelekha Mukhopadhyay, Sanghamitra Bandyopadhyay, Arun Mukhopadhyay and Shyamal Ghoshal.
Atmaja	1990	Featuring Gauri Ghosh, Arjun Chakraborty, Meghnad Bhattacharya, Partha Sarathy Deb and Dhurjoti Prasad Mukherjee.
Shilpi	1993	Featuring Anjan Dutta, Rwita Dutta Chakraborty, Asit Bandopadhyay and Sreelekha Mukherjee.
Souda	1997	Featuring Vasanta Chowdhury, Joy Banerjee and Chaiti Ghosal.
Mansur Miyar Ghora	1999	Featuring Arun Mukhopadhyay and Raisul Islam.

== Awards and participation ==
=== Feature films ===
Film	Year	Award / Festival	Category / Result
Ranur Pratham Bhag (First Book of Ranu)	1972	President's Award	Best Child Actress
Aaj Kaal Parshur Galpa (Story of Today, Tomorrow and the Day After)	1982–1984	Indian Panorama	Selected – 1982
Aaj Kaal Parshur Galpa (Story of Today, Tomorrow and the Day After)	1982–1984	Commonwealth Film Festival, Brisbane	Certificate of Merit – 1982
Aaj Kaal Parshur Galpa (Story of Today, Tomorrow and the Day After)	1982–1984	Moscow Film Festival	Participation – 1982
Aaj Kaal Parshur Galpa (Story of Today, Tomorrow and the Day After)	1982–1984	BFJA Award	Best Film and Best Direction – 1983
Aaj Kaal Parshur Galpa (Story of Today, Tomorrow and the Day After)	1982–1984	Ritwik Ghatak Award	Best Direction – 1983
Aaj Kaal Parshur Galpa (Story of Today, Tomorrow and the Day After)	1982–1984	Pramathesh Barua Paritoshik Award	Best Film and Best Direction – 1983
Aaj Kaal Parshur Galpa (Story of Today, Tomorrow and the Day After)	1982–1984	Dishari Award	Best Film and Best Direction – 1982
Aaj Kaal Parshur Galpa (Story of Today, Tomorrow and the Day After)	1982–1984	Kamal Majumdar Smriti Puraskar	Best Film and Best Direction – 1984
Chopper	1986–1987	Indian Panorama	Selected – 1986
Chopper	1986–1987	Tashkent Film Festival	Participation – 1986
Chopper	1986–1987	Karlovy Vary Film Festival	Participation – 1986
Chopper	1986–1987	Cairo Film Festival	Participation – 1986
Chopper	1986–1987	Montreal Film Festival	Participation – 1986
Chopper	1986–1987	BFJA Award	Best Director and Best Film – 1987
Chopper	1986–1987	CCI Award (Critics Circle of India)	Best Film and Best Direction – 1987
Chopper	1986–1987	Art Forum Award	Best Direction – 1987
Sarisreep (Reptile)	1988	Indian Panorama	Selected – 1988
Sarisreep (Reptile)	1988	Montreal Film Festival	Participation – 1988
Sarisreep (Reptile)	1988	Moscow Film Festival	Participation – 1988
Sarisreep (Reptile)	1988	Chicago Film Festival	Participation – 1988
Parashuramer Kuthar (The Avenger)	1990	Indian Panorama	Selected – 1990
Parashuramer Kuthar (The Avenger)	1990	National Film Award	Second Best Feature Film (Silver Lotus) – 1990
Parashuramer Kuthar (The Avenger)	1990	National Film Award	Best Actress – 1990
Parashuramer Kuthar (The Avenger)	1990	Cairo International Film Festival	Participation – 1990
Parashuramer Kuthar (The Avenger)	1990	Ritwik Kumar Ghatak Award	Best Director – 1990
Atmaja (Born Within)	1991–1993	Indian Panorama	Selected – 1991
Atmaja (Born Within)	1991–1993	National Film Award	Best Bengali Feature Film – 1991
Atmaja (Born Within)	1991–1993	Fukuoka Film Festival, Japan	Participation – 1991
Atmaja (Born Within)	1991–1993	ABC Network	Participation – 1991
Atmaja (Born Within)	1991–1993	Nataraj Puraskar	Best Director – 1993
Shilpi (The Dreamer)	1994–2002	Indian Panorama	Selected – 1994
Shilpi (The Dreamer)	1994–2002	44th International Film Festival, Berlin	World premiere – 1994
Shilpi (The Dreamer)	1994–2002	Amiens International Film Festival, France	Award for Artistic Contribution and Excellence in Cinema – 1994
Shilpi (The Dreamer)	1994–2002	World Television Competition, Japan	Best Film – 1994
Shilpi (The Dreamer)	1994–2002	Sydney Film Festival	Participation – 1994
Shilpi (The Dreamer)	1994–2002	Karlovy Vary Film Festival	Participation – 1994
Shilpi (The Dreamer)	1994–2002	Toronto Film Festival	Participation – 1994
Shilpi (The Dreamer)	1994–2002	Vancouver Film Festival	Participation – 1994
Shilpi (The Dreamer)	1994–2002	Fribourg Film Festival	Participation – 1995
Shilpi (The Dreamer)	1994–2002	Pramathesh Barua Paritoshik Award	Best Director and Best Film – 1995
Shilpi (The Dreamer)	1994–2002	Dishari Award / Art Forum Award	Best Direction and Best Screenplay – 1995; Best Director – 2002
Mansur Mian-r Ghora (Last Ride)	1999–2001	Indian Panorama	Selected – 1999
Mansur Mian-r Ghora (Last Ride)	1999–2001	Bite the Mango Film Festival, United Kingdom	Participation – 2000
Mansur Mian-r Ghora (Last Ride)	1999–2001	Dhaka International Film Festival, Bangladesh	Participation – 2001
Mansur Mian-r Ghora (Last Ride)	1999–2001	Festival of Contemporary Indian Cinema, Seychelles	Participation – 2001
Mansur Mian-r Ghora (Last Ride)	1999–2001	BFJA Award	Best Film – 2001
Mansur Mian-r Ghora (Last Ride)	1999–2001	BFJA Award	Best Actor – 2001
Mansur Mian-r Ghora (Last Ride)	1999–2001	Dishari Award	Best Director – 2001
Souda (A Deal)	1997–1998	Indian Panorama	Selected – 1997
Souda (A Deal)	1997–1998	Pyongyang International Film Festival	Best Film – 1998
Souda (A Deal)	1997–1998	Sochi International Film Festival	Participation – 1998
Souda (A Deal)	1997–1998	Alexandria International Film Festival	Participation – 1998

=== Documentaries ===
Documentary	Year	Award / Festival	Category / Result
Glimpses of Bengal Terracotta	—	National and international recognition	Nationally and internationally acclaimed
Bleeding in the Sun	1997	Indian Panorama	Selected – 1997
Bleeding in the Sun	1997	BFJA Award	Best Director and Best Documentary Film – 1997
