= Nabanna (drama) =

1944 Bengali drama by Bijon Bhattacharya

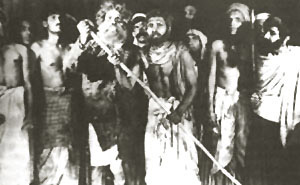
A scene from the drama.

Nabanna is a Bengali-language drama written by Bijon Bhattacharya in 1944 and staged by the Indian People's Theatre Association (IPTA) the same year under the joint direction of Sombhu Mitra and Bijon Bhattacharya, and in 1948, by Bohurupee under the direction of Sombhu Mitra. The play is about the Bengal famine of 1943. The Bengal IPTA took the play to many parts of India as a part of its festival, Voice of Bengal, and it became a major success and collected lakhs of rupees for famine relief in rural Bengal.

== Plot ==
The drama is about the Bengal famine of 1943 in which more than 2 million people died of starvation, malnutrition and disease. The main character is Pradhan Samaddar, a peasant in Bengal. The play presents the intensity of famine through the starvation of Pradhan Samaddar's family. Samaddar's family face a range of disasters during the food crisis.
