= Anya Theatre =

Bengali theatre group founded in 1985

- Anya Theatre logo
- Type: Theatre group
- Location: Kolkata, India
- Artistic director: Bibhas Chakraborty

Anya Theatre is a Bengali theatre group. The group was founded in 1985 by Bibhas Chakraborty.

== History ==
Anya Theatre was founded by Bengali theatre personality Bibhas Chakraborty in 1985. He has been the director of the group since then. It is the only theatre group to have a theatre centre. The group came into prominence as a composite drama form. Anya Theatre is the only theatre group in the state to have a house of its own. It built a three-story building in the Salt Lake city which functions as a theatre centre. Anya Theatre has been organizing Natyaswapnakalpo, a theatre-related annual program being held on the New Year’s Eve since 1999, involving the entire theatre fraternity of the state. Anya Theatre has been regularly inviting young and promising directors to direct plays for the young group during all this years Dattatreya Dutta, Debesh Chattopadhyay, Ramaprasad Banik, Goutam Halder, Abanti Chakraborty, Arna Mukhopadhyay and have enriched the group with some outstanding productions involving our own actors and technicians.

== Productions ==
(in alphabetical order)

- Achhe Achhe Sthan
- Charam Chikitsha
- Hamlet
- Jagakhichuri
- Nakchhabita
- Rajrakta
- Revenge Factory
