= Calcutta Puppet Theatre =

Calcutta Puppet Theatre is a Bengali puppet academy, theatre group, an institute of dance, drama and music. The group was formed in 1973 by Suresh Dutta.

== Performances ==
- Ramayan (1982)
- Aladin
- Seeta
- Ajob desh
- Kagoj
- Kaktarua
- Kalo hira
- Boka hash
