= Rangakarmee =

Indian theatre group based in Kolkata

- Rangakarmee theatre group logo
- Formation: January 1976
- Type: Theatre group
- Location: Kolkata, West Bengal, India

Rangakarmee is an Indian theatre group based in Kolkata.

== History ==
The theatre group Rangakarmee was founded in January 1976 by Usha Ganguly.

== Description ==
Rangakarmee spearheads Hindi theatre in Kolkata, they have also staged Bengali plays.

Rangakarmee believes in "Theatre with a Mission". Its primary aim is to create awareness about the rampant insensitivity and practice of injustice to which women and other disadvantaged sections of society often fall victim. To carry its message to the audience Rangakarmee, under the guidance of Usha Ganguli, created a language of its own – a style of communication solely dependent on theatre, which can cross the barrier of languages spoken by different communities within India and abroad.

Anirudh Sarkar is an Indian theatre director, actor, and trainer based in Kolkata, West Bengal. He serves as the director of Rangakarmee, where he trained. Sarkar has directed and performed in productions including Rudali, Chandalika, Maiyyat, Aadhe Adhure, and the META-winning Chandaa Bedni. He is also recognized for experimental works and for conducting acting workshops in collaboration with institutions like the National School of Drama.

== Productions ==
- Mahabhoj (The Great Feast) (1984)
- Lok Katha (Folk Tale) (1987)
- Holi (1989)
- Vama (1990)
- Court Martial (1991)
- Rudali (The Mourner) (1992)
- Khoj (1994)
- Beti Aayee (1996)
- Maiyyat (1997)
- Himmat Mai (Mother Courage) (1998)
- Shyama’r Udal
- Shobhayatra (2000)
- Kashinama (2003)
- Chandalika
- Sarhad Par Manto
- Pashmina
- Abhi Raat Baaki Hai
- Manasi (in Bengali) (2011)
- Saptaparnee
- Meghdutam
- Atmaj
- Chandaa Bedni
- Aadhe Adhure
