= Meghnad Bhattacharya =

Bengali theatre director and actor

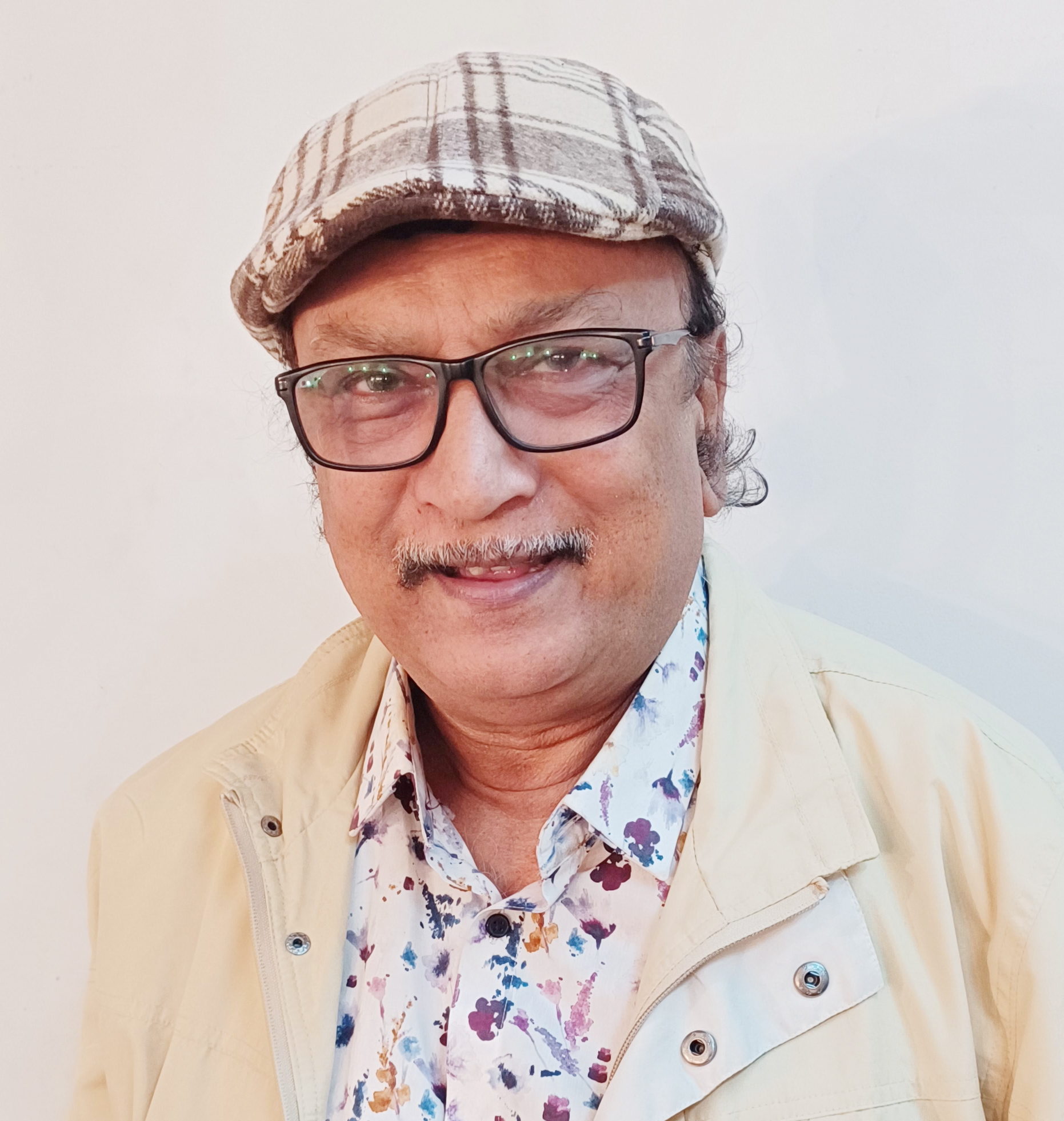
- Born: 1952 (age 73–74)
- Occupation: Actor
- Known for: Director of Sayak

Meghnad Bhattacharya (born 1952) is a Bengali theatre director and actor. He is the artistic director of Bengali theatre group Sayak. He has also acted in few Bengali films and television serials. In 1979 under the leadership of Bhattacharya and Sayak Bijon Theatre was established.

== Biography ==
Bhattacharya was born in 1952. In December 1973 he founded the Bengali theatre group Sayak which till January 2012 has staged 21 full length and 7 short length plays.

== Works ==
=== Plays ===
Year	Drama	Note
1978	Naramedh	
1979	Duihuzurer goppo	
1981	Sadhusanga	
1982	Kalbhianga	Short play
1983	Anubikshan	
1983	Sonarmathaoala Manush	Example
1985	Gyan Briksher Fol	Example
1986	Parui Masher Bishoy Ashoy	Short play
1987	Astitwa	Short play
1988	Jadio Swapna	
1990	Beokuf	
1991	Daibaddha	
1993	Basbhumi	
1996	Karnabati	
1998	Aa-aa-ka-kha	
1999	Marachand	Short play
2001	Andhagali	
2001	Nari	Short play
2002	Badhutantra	
2004	Saanjbela	
2005	Benche Thaka	
2006	Dildar	
2007	Swarna-champa	Short play
2008	Dournama	

=== Films ===
Year	Film	Director
1990	Jowar Bhanta	Dulal Bhowmik
1993	Aatmajo	Nabyendu Chatterjee
1994	Shilpi	Nabyendu Chatterjee
1994	Nati Binodini	Dinen Gupta
1997	Dus Number Bari	Biresh Chattopadhyay
2003	Parampar	
2019	Surjo Prithibir Chardike Ghore	Arijit Biswas

== Awards ==
- ABP Ananda Sera Bangali Award: 2022
