= Bohurupee =

Indian theatre group

- A scene from Char Adhyay (1951), a play staged by Bohurupee
- Formation: 1948
- Type: Theatre group
- Location: Kolkata, West Bengal, India
- Notable members: Sombhu Mitra, Tripti Mitra, Kumar Roy

Bohurupee is a Bengali premier theatre group. Bohurupee was founded in 1948 by several active members who left the Indian People's Theatre Association. The group was created to present the experimental Bengali drama in unusual form.

== Early days ==
After breaking away from Indian People's Theatre Association, prominent Bengali theatre personalities like Sombhu Mitra, Bijon Bhattacharya created Bohurupee in 1948. The group came into prominence as a composite drama form. This period was a period of struggle for Bohurupee. Between 1950 and 1958 they directed multiple important plays. They staged Rabindranath Tagore's play Char Adhyay in 1951. In 1958, they stage another work of Tagore - Raktakaravi. In Putulkhela (1958), which was a depiction of Ibsen's Doll's House, Bohurupee touched a sensitive contemporary issue in bold manner. They adapted various international plays viz. Dasachakra (1962), which was adapted from An Enemy of the People by Henrik Ibsen and Raja Oedipous (1964), an adaptation of Oedipus Rex by Sophocles.

== Selected plays ==
- Char Adhyay (1951)
- Raktakaravi (1954)
- Putulkhela (1958)
- Visarjan (1961)
- Dasachakra (1962)
- Raja Oidipous (1964)
- Raja (1964)
- Chop! Adalat Cholche (1971)
- Dakghar (1973)
- Ghare Baire (1974)
- Mrichchhakatika (1979)
- Galileo (1980)
- Rajdarsan (1982)
- Aguner pakhi (1984)
- Mr. Kakatuya (1987)
- Kinu Kaharer Thetar (1988)
- Nabanna (1989)

== Awards ==
- Airlines Cultural Organisation - Kolkata - Contribution to Bengali Theatre
- Anya Theatre - Kolkata - Distinguished Theatre personality Natya Swapnakalpa - 2004
- Dishari - Kolkata - Best Actor - Nisiddha Thikana - 2004

== See also ==
- Sombhu Mitra
- Tripti Mitra
- Kumar Roy
