= Sombhu Mitra =

Indian actor and director (1915–1997)

- Born: 22 August 1915; Calcutta, Bengal Presidency, British India
- Died: 19 May 1997 (aged 81); Kolkata, West Bengal, India
- Occupations: Actor, director, playwright
- Spouse: Tripti Mitra
- Children: Shaoli Mitra
- Awards: Padma Bhushan (1970)

Sombhu Mitra (22 August 1915 – 19 May 1997) was an Indian film and stage actor, director, playwright, reciter and an Indian theatre personality, known especially for his involvement in Bengali theatre, where he is considered a pioneer. He remained associated with the Indian People's Theatre Association (IPTA) for a few years before founding the Bohurupee theatre group in Kolkata in 1948. He is most noted for films like Dharti Ke Lal (1946), Jagte Raho (1956), and his production of Rakta Karabi based on Rabindranath Tagore's play in 1954 and Chand Baniker Pala, his most noted play as a playwright.

In 1966, the Sangeet Natak Akademi awarded him its highest award, the Sangeet Natak Akademi Fellowship for lifetime contribution. In 1970, he was awarded the Padma Bhushan, India's third highest civilian honour, and in 1976 the Ramon Magsaysay Award.

== Early life and education ==
Born in Calcutta (now Kolkata), India, on 22 August 1915, Sombhu Mitra was the sixth child among the three sons and four daughters of Sarat Kumar Mitra, an employee of the Geological Survey of India, and Satadalbasini Mitra. His mother died when he was 12 years old.

He started his schooling in Chakraberia Middle English School, Calcutta and later continued in the Ballygunge Government High School, Calcutta, where he developed interest reading Bengali plays and became active in school dramatics. He joined St. Xavier's College of the University of Calcutta in 1931, and soon started attending the local theatre.

== Career ==
His first appearance in Bengali theatre was in Rangmahal Theatre in north Kolkata in 1939, thereafter he moved to the Minerva, Natyaniketan and Srirangam theatres.

In 1943, he joined Indian People's Theatre Association (IPTA). In 1944, several old theatrical conventions were broken when the play Nabanna written by Bijon Bhattacharya and co-directed by Sombhu Mitra for IPTA was staged. In 1948, Sombhu Mitra formed a new theatre group, Bohurupee in Kolkata, which ushered in the group-theatre movement in West Bengal.

He married Tripti Mitra née Bhaduri, who was also a celebrated personality in the Bengali theatre. Their daughter, Shaoli was a noted actress, director and playwright.

== The Bohurupee productions ==
Under Sombhu Mitra's direction, the Bohurupee staged several successful productions. In December 1950, the Bohurupee presented three plays in the New Empire theatre – Tulsi Lahiri's Pathik and Chenda Tar and Sombhu Mitra's own creation, Ulukhagra. In 1954, Rabindranath Tagore's Rakta Karabi was staged by the Bohurupee, followed by his Bisarjan, Raja and Char Adhyay. Other notable productions include Bidhyak Bhattacharya's Tahar Namti Ranjana and Kanchanranga. Under his direction, this group also presented the Bengali adaptations of several well-known dramas from the world stage. Henrik Ibsen's Putul Khela (Doll's House), Dashachakra (An Enemy of the People) and Sophocles' Raja Oidipaus (Oedipus Rex) are notable amongst them.

He has also acted in The Life of Galileo by Bertolt Brecht directed by Fritz Bennewitz in the title role.

In these productions he performed as Rahimuddin in Chenda Tar, Atin in Char Adhyay, Binod in Ulukhagra, Tapan in Putul Khela, Dr. Purnendu Guha in Dashachakra, Oidipaus in Raja Oidipaus.

He died in Kolkata.

== Filmography ==
Sombhu Mitra performed in several movies in Bengali and Hindi. The notable among them are:

- Dharti Ke Lal (1946) (Hindi)
- Abhiyatri (1947) (Bengali)
- Dhatri Debata (1948) (Bengali)
- Abarta (1949) (Bengali)
- '42 (1949) (Bengali)
- Hindustan Hamara (Hindi)
- Pathik (1953) (Bengali)
- Bou Thakuranir Haat (1953) (Bengali)
- Maharaj Nandakumar (1953) (Bengali)
- Maraner Pare (1954) (Bengali)
- Shivashakti (1954) (Bengali)
- Durlabh Janma (1955) (Bengali)
- Manik (1961) (Bengali)
- Suryasnan (1962) (Bengali)
- Panna (1967) (Bengali)
- Natun Pata (1969) (Bengali)
- Nishachar (1971) (Bengali)

He wrote the story and screenplay of Jagte Raho (1956) and also co-directed it along with Amit Maitra. He also directed a Bengali movie, Shubha Bibaha in 1959.

== Major works ==
- Abhinay Natak Mancha (in Bengali) (1957)
- Sanmarga-Saparya (in Bengali)
- Natak Raktakarabi (in Bengali)
- Chandbaniker Pala (in Bengali)

== Honours and awards ==
Sombhu Mitra received many national and international awards, which include the Crystal Globe for Jagte Raho at the 1957 Karlovy Vary International Film Festival, the Desikottama from Visva Bharati University in 1989, an honorary D. Litt. from both Rabindra Bharati University and Jadavpur University in Kolkata, the Ramon Magsaysay Award in 1976 for journalism, literature and creative communication arts and the Padmabhushan in the same year. He received the Sangeet Natak Akademi Fellowship in 1966. For his contribution in the movies, he won the Grand-Prix Award at the Karlovy Vary International Film Festival. Madhya Pradesh Government honoured him with Kalidas Samman (1982–83).

National Film Awards

- 1956 – Certificate of Merit for Best Feature Film in Bengali – Ek Din Ratre

== See also ==
- Bengali Theatre
