= Bibhash Chakraborty =

Indian Bengali actor, writer and theatre personality

- Born: 23 September 1937 (age 88); Sylhet, Bengal Presidency, British India
- Occupations: Theatre director, actor

Bibhash Chakraborty (alternatively spelt Bibhas Chakraborty; born 23 September 1937) is an Indian Bengali actor and theatre personality. He is also a social activist. He is a prolific writer too. He was associated with Paschim Banga Natya Akademi for many years.

== Early life ==
Chakraborty was born on 23 September 1937 in Sylhet, British India (currently Bangladesh). He used to stay near the Burma border, and his childhood years were affected by the worries of a possible Japanese attack during World War II.

== Career ==
In the beginning of acting career, Bibhash Chakraborty joined Bohurupee, however his stint with Bohurupee was disappointing. In 1960s he joined the Bengali theatre group Nandikar. In Nandikar, he acted in several plays directed by Ajitesh Bandopadhyay. He left Nandikar in 1966 and formed "Theatre Workshop". During these days, he directed several plays such as Rajrakta (written by Mohit Chattopadhyay), Chakbhanga Modhu (written by Manoj Mitra) etc. The drama Rajarakta was a very significant one in the history of Bengali theatre.

In 1985, he formed a Bengali theatre group "Anya Theatre".

Chakraborty was associated with Paschim Banga Natya Akademi for many years as a member, almost from the institution's inception. In 2018 he resigned from the institution citing age reason.

== Filmography ==
- Aamaar Bhuvan (2002)
- Path-o-Prasad (1991)
- Amar Prithibi (1985)
- Parashuram (1979)
- Chhera Tamsuk (1974)

Bhalobasar Bari

== Awards ==
In 1989 Bibhas Chakraborty received Sangeet Natak Akademi Award.
