= Indian People's Theatre Association =

Indian theatre company organization

Indian People's Theatre Association (IPTA)
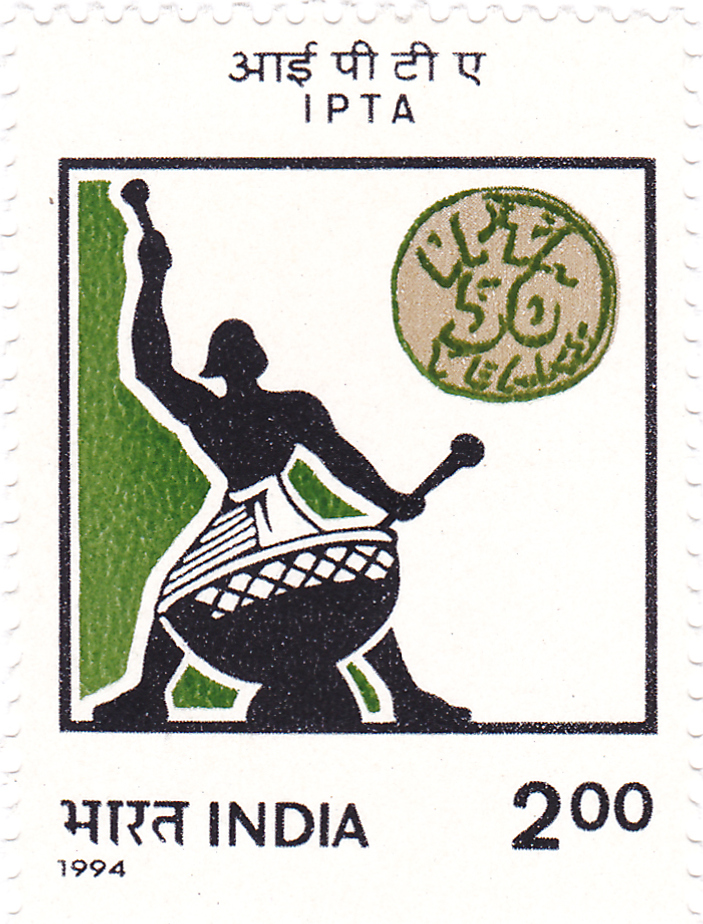
- 1994 postage stamp of India, commemorating the 50th anniversary of IPTA.
- Formation: 25 May 1943 (83 years ago); Bombay, Bombay Presidency, British Raj
- Type: Cultural Organization
- President: Prasanna
- General Secretary: Tanwir Akhtar
- Affiliations: N/A
- Website: ipta.in

Indian People's Theatre Association (IPTA) is the oldest association of theatre-artists in India. IPTA was formed in 1943 during the British rule in India, and promoted themes related to the Indian freedom struggle. Its goal was to bring cultural awakening among the people of India.

== Beginning ==
The Bangalore unit of IPTA was formed in 1941. IPTA was formed on 25 May 1943 at the National conference of theater artists held at the Marwari school, Bombay in response to the need for theater artists to become part of the Indian freedom struggle. Its origins lay in the first Progressive Writer's Association Conference that was held in 1936, the establishment of the Youth Cultural Institute at Calcutta in 1940, and the setting up of the People's Theatre in Bangalore by Anil De' Silva in 1941. Its initial members consisted of various progressive cultural troupes, theatre groups and other progressive cultural activists. The name People's Theatre was suggested by the renowned scientist Homi J. Bhabha who was in turn inspired by Romain Rolland's book on the concepts of People's Theatre.

Its initial activities included street plays organized by Binoy Roy of the Bengal Cultural Squad to inform people of the 1942 manmade famine in Bengal. Their ski included a choir 'Bhookha Hai Bengal' created by Vamik Jaunpuri and other songs and plays. The squad included musician Prem Dhawan, drum player Dashrath Lal, singer Reva Roy and actress Usha Dutt. Motivated by this squad, several other cultural groups were formed including the Agra Cultural Squad. IPTA was subsequently formed to organize these local groups at the national level.

Ideologically these groups were inspired by the left movement and the then General Secretary of the Communist Party of India, P.C. Joshi and the General Secretary of the Progressive Writers' Association Sajjad Zaheer.

== Initial members ==
Some of the initial members of the group were Prithviraj Kapoor, Bijon Bhattacharya, Balraj Sahni, Ritwik Ghatak, Utpal Dutt, Khwaja Ahmad Abbas, Salil Chowdhury, Pandit Ravi Shankar, Jyotirindra Moitra, Niranjan Singh Maan, S. Tera Singh Chan, Jagdish Faryadi, Khalili Faryadi, Rajendra Raghuvanshi, Safdar Mir, Areeba Sehar, Hasan Premani, Amiya Bose, Sudhin Dasgupta, Annabhau Sathe, Shahir Amar shaik etc. The group was formed in 1942, in the background of the Second World War, with Bengal famine of 1943 and starvation deaths in India on the one hand and repression by the colonial masters in the wake of the Quit India Movement and the aggression by the fascist powers on the Soviet Union on the other. An All India People's Theatre Conference was held in Mumbai in 1943 where the group presented its idea and objective of representing the crisis of the time through the medium of theatre and to help people understand their rights and duties. This conference led to the formation of committees of IPTA across India. The movement hit not only theatres, but also cinema and music in Indian languages. Now it is the cultural wing of the Communist Party of India (CPI).

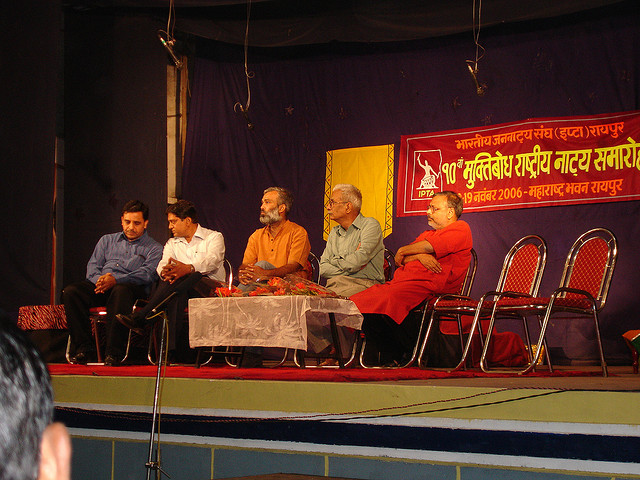
Natya Samaroh by IPTA, Chhattisgarh, India

== Break up and legacy ==
IPTA Mumbai was another offshoot that has existed over the last six decades and continue to produce dramas till date. IPTA offshoots exist in other parts of India as well.

Group theaters like Nandikar, Spandan of Kolkata still produce their dramas often in the line of the IPTA movement, and recently there has been effort to start a similar movement inspired by the IPTA.

== IPTA in West Bengal ==
At present IPTA West Bengal is a running organisation led by IPTA West Bengal State Committee. The Secretary is Sri Dibyendu Chattopadhyay, President Sri Hiranmoy Ghosal, Asst. Secretary Sri Ashis Deb and Abhijit Ghosh. There are many cultural personalities like mass singer Kankan Bhattacharjee, Shankar Mukherjee, Debidas Tarafder, Mandira Bhattacharya, Sangita Roy Chowdhuri, Shurti Narayan, Subhaprasad Nandi Mazumder, Santosh Karmakar, Ashim Bandyapadhyay, Supantha Basu, Firoj Ahmed, Soma Chanda, Srupratik, Sriparna Mitra, Swapna Banerjee, Manudhirity Kritaniya, Ashok Mukherjee, Biplab Roy, Anjan Chatterjee, Haimantika Roy, Kamal Ghosh, Kunal Dey, Rekha Hembram, Pradip Roy Chowdhury, Ambarish Roy, and many others. Dramatist: Piyus Sarkar, Tapan Hazra, Ashis Chatterjee, Manish Ghosh, Jayanta Chakraborty, Shyamal Bhattacharya, Paritosh Bhattacharya, Shibankar Chakraborty, Actor: Samudra Guha, Subhajit Dhar, Bolanath Mukherjee, Mousumi Joarder, Rubi Gandhi, Bapi Dasgupta, Somya Bhowmik, Madhuja Ghoshal, Atanu Mandol, Abhijit Chatterjee, Dipanwita Chakraborty, Sandhya Halder, Goutam Saha, Pinakpani Dasgupta, Sugata Banerjee and others. Dancer: Ashis Deb, Kakoli Deb, Dona, Iti, etc. Film Maker Manish Ghosh, Piyush Sarkar, Pradip Chakraborty, Ambarish Roy etc. There are 23 District Committees under this organisation and there are approximately 11,000 Artist members in this organization. IPTA W B has been reorganised in its 3rd conference held on 1967 at Kolkata Bagbazar reading room Library.

== IPTA in Assam ==
The Assam chapter of IPTA, which worked for the development of humanity through culture, was formed in 1947. Hemango Biswas, the founder secretary of the chapter, worked with some of the prominent personalities of the state such as Jyotiprasad Agarwala, Bishnu Prasad Rabha and Bhupen Hazarika among others. Bhupen Hazarika began close association with IPTA soon after returning from the United States in the 1950s. The golden period of IPTA, from 1952 to 1962, coincided with the golden days of Hazarika's musical career. It was during this period that he composed some of his immortal numbers, including Dola He Dola, Rongmon Macholoi Gol, Manuhe Manuhor Babe and others. Biswas and Hazarika jointly organized the third Assam conference of IPTA in 1955, when the likes of Balraj Sahni, Salil Chowdhury and Hemanta Mukherjee participated, among others. Some of the famous plays presented by IPTA were Sonali Dhanani, Seujia Kuhipaat, Tofaan, Navaprabhat, Sapasalor Seka etc. and many shadow plays like Poharaloi, Amar Jatra, 15 Augustor Ahban and Tirut Singh.

In the 21st century, plays like Sadgati (Munshi Premchand), Dur Deshor Kotha, Kio (Phani Sarma), Arjun Tolir Dhumuha (Deb Kumar Saikia) and An Inspector Calls in 2019 directed by Prodyut Kumar Deka were staged in different parts of the State. The Assam chapter celebrated the birth centenary of its founder secretary Hemango Biswas in 2012. On the occasion of platinum jubilee of IPTA, the chapter organized a drama festival on 11–12 March 2019 at District Library, Guwahati. Two plays Laalchurni and Coffee Housot Apeksha (Laxmi Narayan Lal) respectively were staged during the two day event.

== See also ==
- Star Theatre, Kolkata
- Dharti Ke Lal
