= Bijon Bhattacharya =

Indian actor (1915–1978)

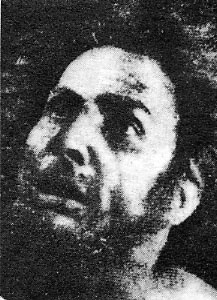
- Bijon Bhattacharya in Nabanna
- Born: 1906; Faridpur, Bengal Presidency, British India
- Died: 19 January 1978; Calcutta, West Bengal, India
- Occupation: Theater actor
- Known for: Family - Binoy Bihari Laskar
- Spouse: Mahasweta Devi (1947–1962)
- Children: Nabarun Bhattacharya

Bijon Bhattacharya (1906 – 19 January 1978) was an Indian actor from West Bengal associated with Bengali theatre and films. He was an eminent playwright and dramatist.

== Personal life ==
Bhattacharya was born in 1906 at Faridpur (now in Bangladesh) to a Bengali family, and was an early witness to the destitution and penury of the peasantry of that land. He became a member of the Indian People's Theatre Association (IPTA).

Bhattacharya married the Jnanpith Award-winning Bengali writer, Mahasweta Devi. Their only son Nabarun Bhattacharya, a Bengali writer, was born in 1948.. Actor Sabyasachi Chakrabarty is his nephew.

== Works ==
=== Dramas ===
- Agun
- Nabanna (Fresh Harvest) (1944)
- Jabanbandi (Confession)
- Kalanka
- Mara Chand (Dead Moon) (1951)
- Gotrantar (Change of Lineage) (1959)
- Debi Garjan (Shouting of the Goddess) (1966)
- Garbhabati Janani (Pregnant Mother) (1969)
- Krishnapaksha
- Aj Basanta
- Chalo Sagare
- Lash Ghuirya Jauk
- Aborodh
- Krishnapaksha
- Jionkanya
- Hanskhalir Hans

=== Films ===
- Tathapi (1950)
- Chinnamul (1951)
- Sharey Chuattor (1953)
- Bari Theke Paliye (1958)
- Meghe Dhaka Tara (1960) - Taran Master
- Komal Gandhar (1961) - Gagan
- Kashtipathar (1964)
- Trishna (1965)
- Subarnarekha (1965) - Haraprasad
- Swapna Niye (1966)
- Kamallata (1969)
- Parineeta (1969)
- Nabarag (1971)
- Pratham Basanta (1971)
- Padatik (1973) - Activist's Father
- Thagini (1974)
- Jukti Takko Aar Gappo (1974) - Jagannath
- Bhola Moira (1977)
- Swati (1977)
- Dooratwa (1979) - (final film role)
