= List of Indian comedy films =

This is a list of notable Indian comedy films.

== Bengali Films ==
Year	Film
1952	Pasher Bari
1953	Sharey Chuattor
1958	Bhanu Pelo Lottery
1959	Chaowa Pawa (1959 film)
1966	Galpo Holeo Satti
1967	Ashite Ashiona
1971	Dhanyee Meye
1973	Shriman Prithviraj
1973	Basanta Bilap
1973	Marjina Abdulla
1974	Mouchak
1978	Charmurti
1980	Dadar Kirti
1980	Paka Dekha
1992	Goopy Bagha Phire Elo
2004	Gyarakal
2005	Raju Uncle
2010	The Japanese Wife
2011	Tenida (film)
2026	Get Up Kinghsuk

== Malayalam films ==
Year	Film
1986	Mazha Peyyunnu Maddalam Kottunnu
1987	Nadodikattu
1988	Pattanapravesham
1989	Vandanam
1989	Ramji Rao Speaking
1990	Akkare Akkare Akkare
1990	In Harihar Nagar
1991	Kilukkam
1991	Mimics Parade
1991	Mookilla Rajyathu
1991	Godfather
1991	Meleparambil Aanveedu
1994	Pidakkozhi Koovunna Noottandu
1994	Thenmavin Kombath
2000	Kakkakkuyil
2001	Ee Parakkum Thalika
2003	C.I.D. Moosa
2004	Chathikkatha Chanthu
2004	Vettam
2007	Mayavi
2007	Chotta Mumbai
2007	Chocolate
2007	Hallo
2000	Chandralekha
2008	Crazy Gopalan
2008	Lollipop
2009	2 Harihar Nagar
2010	Happy Husbands
2010	In Ghost House Inn
2010	Kaaryasthan
2010	Marykkundoru Kunjaadu
2012	My Boss
2013	Romans
2015	Aadu
2015	Oru Vadakkan Selfie
2015	Amar Akbar Anthony
2015	Two Countries
2015	Kunjiramayanam
2015	Adi Kapyare Kootamani
2016	King Liar
2016	Happy Wedding
2016	Kattappanayile Rithwik Roshan

== Tamil films ==
Year	Film
1941	Sabapathy
1957	Pudhaiyal
1960	Adutha Veettu Penn
1962	Bale Pandiya
1964	Kadhalikka Neramillai
1966	Madras to Pondicherry
1967	Bama Vijayam
1968	Galatta Kalyanam
1970	Uttharavindri Ulle Vaa
1972	Kasethan Kadavulada
1981	Thillu Mullu
1981	Indru Poi Naalai Vaa
1985	Aan Paavam
1987	Pesum Padam
1988	Guru Sishyan
1988	Idhu Namma Aalu
1989	Apoorva Sagodharargal
1989	Karagattakaran
1991	Michael Madana Kama Rajan
1992	Singaravelan
1994	Magalir Mattum
1995	Sathi Leelavathi
1996	Ullathai Allitha
1996	Kaalam Maari Pochu
1997	Pistha
1998	Kaathala Kaathala
1998	Harichandra
1999	Viralukketha Veekkam
1999	Unakkaga Ellam Unakkaga
2000	Thenali
2001	Friends
2002	Pammal K. Sambandam
2002	Panchathanthiram
2002	Thenkasi Pattanam
2003	Vaseegara
2004	Engal Anna
2004	Vasool Raja MBBS
2004	Aethirree
2007	Chennai 600028
2008	Sadhu Miranda
2010	Tamizh Padam
2012	Attakathi
2012	Kadhalil Sodhappuvadhu Yeppadi
2012	Naduvula Konjam Pakkatha Kaanom
2013	Soodhu Kavvum
2013	Moodar Koodam
2014	Vaayai Moodi Pesavum
2017	Meesaya Murukku
2020	Doctor

== See also ==
- List of Indian romance films
- List of Indian horror films
