= Parthapratim Deb =

Indian actor (born 1963)

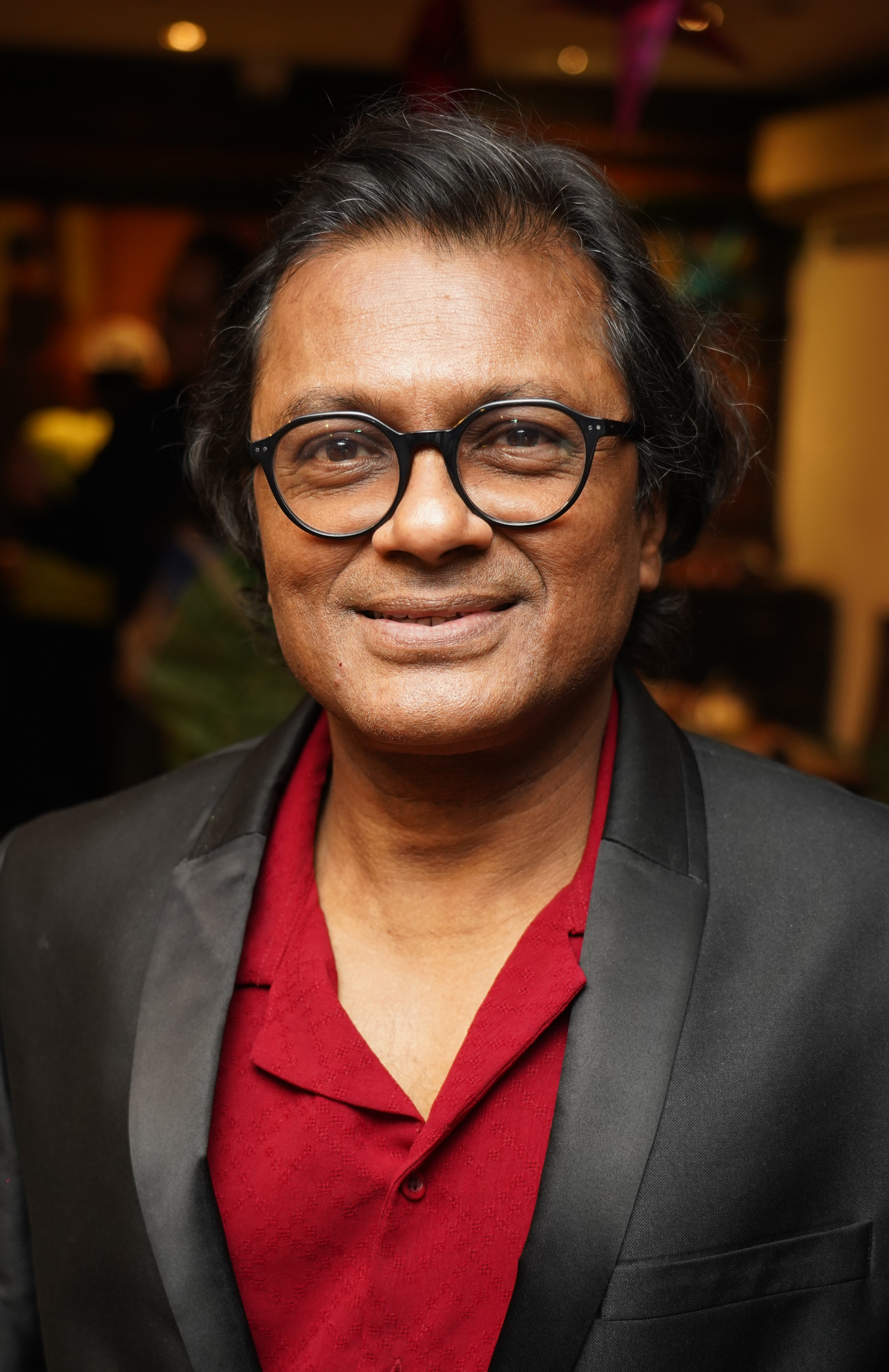
- Parthapratim Deb
- Born: 8 November 1963 (age 62); Kolkata, West Bengal, India
- Education: Sanskrit Collegiate School, University of Calcutta
- Occupations: Singer, actor, director, playwright
- Known for: Panchajanya, Naachni, Goynar Baksho
- Spouse: Rupa Deb (m. 1996)
- Children: Rup Deb

Parthapratim Deb (Note: Spelling according to The Hindu.) (or Partha Pratim Deb (Note: Spelling according to The Times of India.)) is an Indian actor, director, playwright, singer and music composer in Bengali theater. He is a member of Nandikar theatre group since 1986 and also runs his own theatre organization, Baghajatin Alaap, since 2005.

After graduation from the University of Calcutta, he joined Nandikar and contributed in multiple capacities to popular productions such as Nana Ronger Din, Amar Priyo Rabindranath, Madhabi, Nachni, and Panchajanya. His long-standing involvement with Nandikar highlights his commitment to the growth and evolution of Bengali theater.

Deb is known for his musical talent, which sets him apart from many of his contemporaries in Bengali theater. He is among the few actors in Bengali theater who have undergone classical vocal training and can sing on stage. A key highlight in his plays is the usage of music, folk songs and dance sequences, a unique trait in Bengali theater.

Deb joined Nandikar as a trainee in 1986. Over the years, he became a theater trainer there. In addition to his work with Nandikar. Deb founded Baghajatin Alaap, where he conducts regular theater workshops. Besides, he has trained actors all over West Bengal and teaches theater to children professionally. Some children's productions he has directed include Gorabubr Swapno, Indian Idol & Swapna Muhurte (written by Debshankar Halder), Tota Kahini, Light of Asia, Monikatha, Wazeb Miyar Biya, and others.

He frequently travels to train Bengali actors and conducts workshops in other countries, including the U.S., Canada, Australia, Kuwait, Sweden, and Oman to train children as well as adult artists in Kolkata and abroad.

== Early life and education ==
Parthapratim Deb was born in Kolkata, West Bengal, on November 8, 1963. He completed his school education at the Sanskrit Collegiate School. Following his school education, Deb pursued higher education at the University of Calcutta, where he graduated with a Bachelor of Arts degree. He received a scholarship from the Department of Culture, Government of India in 1990.

In 1980, Deb undertook training in Rabindra Sangeet under Shri Goutam MItra. After his graduation in 1981, he started taking classes in Hindustani classical music under singer Pandit Sushil Bose, a student of Ustad Bade Ghulam Ali Khan in Patiala gharana. Alongside Nandikar, with the foundation of Baghajatin Alaap, Deb along with his wife Rupa, embarked on the creative journey together. Baghajatin Alaap soon increased in number and performed Bengali theatre across India.

=== Career outside of theater ===
Deb has served as a dramatics teacher of the Shri Shikshayatan School, B.D.Memorial International, Ashok Hall Group of Schools in Kolkata, and the G. D. Birla Memorial School and the Aryaman Vikram Birla Institute of Learning in Uttarakhand.

== Publications ==
Deb has published four original plays, including Naachni, Panchajanya, Samparka, and Mufti-e-Azam. These plays are contained in three books named:

- নাচনি (Naachni) (Bengali: নাচনি, IAST: Nācni) is a Bengali play written by Parthapratim Deb that centers around the miserable life of dancing girls in the Indian subcontinent. It was adapted from Subrata Mukhopadhyay's novel Rasik (Bengali: রসিক) and premiered in 2013 at the Academy of Fine Arts, Kolkata. Naachni tells the story of young girls who are condemned to a life of being sex slaves and entertaining the rich and powerful with their dance performances. The production has a rich collection of songs and dances that depict the gore, guilt, poverty, and sexual exploitation in a system controlled by degenerate men (known as rasiks). Deb directed the play and composed its music as well. Some stalwarts of contemporary Bengali theater such as Rudraprasad Sengupta, Swatilekha Sengupta, Sohini Sengupta, and Debshankar Halder.
- পাঞ্চজন্য (Panchajanya) (Sanskrit: पाञ्चजन्य, Bengali: পাঞ্চজন্য, IAST: Pāñcajanya) is a Bengali play written by Parthapratim Deb, named after Panchajanya, a mythological conch of Vishnu that produced the primeval sound of creation. Woven into the storylines of Mausala Parva, Mahaprasthanika Parva, and Harivaṃśa Parva, the play is connects the various episodes of Mahabharata based on the lament of Gandhari – wife of Dhritarashtra and mother to 100 dead sons and her eventual cursing of Krishna. In the play, Gandhari accuses Krishna of leaving the path of Dharma and therefore curses his clan (the Yadavas) to death by in-fighting. The play premiered on 16 June 2016 at the Academy of Fine Arts, Kolkata under the banner of the theater group Nandikar. Deb played the role of the old Krishna in its debut performance, where Sohini Sengupta played the role of Gandhari.
- দুটি নাটক (Duti Natok)
- সম্পর্ক (Samparka) (Bengali: সম্পর্ক) is a Bengali play written by Parthapratim Deb that revolves around the lives of three generations of men who face a sudden reality check when their old deeds are come back to haunt them in the middle of a happy reunion to celebrate two birthdays. The play premiered on 5 October, 2018, at the Gyan Mancha in Kolkata. Dulal Lahiri and Shantilal Mukherjee played the lead roles along with Parthapratim's son, Rup Deb.
- Mufti-e-Azam is a Bengali play revolving around the Battle of Karbala between the army of the second Umayyad caliph Yazid I (r. 680–683) and a small army led by Husayn ibn Ali, the grandson of the Islamic prophet Muhammad, at Karbala, Sawad (modern-day southern Iraq). Inspired from Bishad Shindhu by Mir Mosharraf Hossain, this play is yet to be staged.

== Theater ==
=== As music director, associate music director, lyricist, playback singer ===
Year	Play	Production by	Director	Playwright
1988	Antigone	Nandikar	Rudraprasad Sengupta	Chittaranjan Ghosh
1988	Football	Nandikar	Rudraprasad Sengupta	Peter Terson/Rudraprasad Sengupta
1988	Shesh Shakshatkaar	Nandikar	Rudraprasad Sengupta	Vladlen Dozortsev/Rudraprasad Sengupta
1991	Ek Theke Baaro	Nandikar	Goutam Halder	Swatilekha Sengupta
1992	Sankhapurer Sukanya	Nandikar	Rudraprasad Sengupta	Bertolt Brecht/ Rudraprasad Sengupta
1994	Feriwalar Mrityu	Nandikar	Rudraprasad Sengupta	Arthur Miller/ Rudraprasad Sengupta
1996	Gotroheen	Nandikar	Rudraprasad Sengupta	Arthur Miller/ Rudraprasad Sengupta
1997	Nagar Keertan	Nandikar	Goutam Halder	Koushik Ray Chowdhury/ Goutam Halder
1998	Brechter Khonje	Nandikar	Rudraprasad Sengupta	Koushik Ray Chowdhury
2000	Ei Sahar Ei Samay	Nandikar	Rudraprasad Sengupta	Koushik Ray Chowdhury
2003	Sojan Badier Ghat	Nandikar	Goutam Halder	Jasimuddin
2004	Wazeb Miyar Biya	Samatat	Parthapratim Deb	
2006	Nana Ranger Din	Nandikar	Rudraprasad Sengupta	Anton Chekhov/ Ajitesh Bandopadhyay
2006	Notun Chele Natobor	Nandikar	Goutam Halder	Swatilekha Sengupta
2006	Padma Nodir Majhi	Pratikriti	Alok Deb	Manik Bandyopadhyay/ Alok Deb
2007	Jaha Chai	Nandikar	Rudraprasad Sengupta	William Shakespeare
2007	Palashi	Natadha	Shib Mukhopadhyay	
2008	Aahare Shaishab	Nandikar	Parthapratim Deb	Debshankar Halder
2008	Ajnatobaas	Nandikar	Sumanta Gangopadhyay	Sukanta Gangopadhyay
2009	Madhabi	Nandikar	Swatilekha Sengupta	Bhisham Sahani/ Swatilekha Sengupta
2010	Mahabhoj	[Baghajatin Alaap]	Parthapratim Deb	Rabindranath Tagore/Parthapratim Deb
2011	Amar Priyo Rabindranath	Nandikar	Swatilekha Sengupta	Koushik Ray Chowdhury
2012	Sagina Mahato	[Baghajatin Alaap]	Parthapratim Deb	Badal Sircar
2013	Naachni	Nandikar	Parthapratim Deb	Subrata Mukhopadhyay/ Parthapratim Deb
2014	Parashmoni	[Baghajatin Alaap]	Parthapratim Deb	Parthapratim Deb
2015	Kittankhola	[Baghajatin Alaap]	Parthapratim Deb	Selim Al Deen
2015	Indian Idol	Mirttika, NJ, USA	Parthapratim Deb	Debshankar Halder
2017	Panchajanya	Nandikar	Sohini Sengupta	Parthapratim Deb
2017	Light of Asia	Mirttika, NJ, USA	Parthapratim Deb	Parthapratim Deb
2017	Sagina Mahato	Epic Actors Workshop, NJ, USA	Parthapratim Deb	Badal Sircar
2017	Goynar Baksho	[Baghajatin Alaap]	Parthapratim Deb	Shirshendu Mukhopadhyay/ Parthapratim Deb
2017	Shiladitya	Mirttika, NJ, USA	Parthapratim Deb	
2018	Aranyadeb	Swapnalu	Premangshu Ray	Bratya Basu
2018	Sagina Mahato	Brischik, Seattle, USA	Parthapratim Deb	Badal Sircar
2018	Samparka	[Baghajatin Alaap]	Parthapratim Deb	Parthapratim Deb
2019	Ranighater Brittanto	[Baghajatin Alaap]	Parthapratim Deb	Parthapratim Deb
2019	Mrityu Na Hotya	Spotlight Ohio, USA	Parthapratim Deb	Bibhash Chakraborty
2019	Manush	Nandikar	Sohini Sengupta	Anindita Chakraborty
2020	Aprakashito	Baghajatin Alaap	Parthapratim Deb	Parthapratim Deb
2021	Kaaler Mandira	Baghajatin Alaap	Parthapratim Deb	Parthapratim Deb
2022	Padma Nodir Majhi	Baghajatin Alaap & Actors of New Jersey, USA at North American Bengali Conference 2022 in Las Vegas	Parthapratim Deb	Parthapratim Deb, Alok Deb (Pratikriti), adapted from Padma Nodir Majhi by Manik Bandyopadhyay
2023	Agoon	Baghajatin Alaap	Parthapratim Deb	Rakesh Ghosh
2023	Indian Idol	TSS, Canada	Parthapratim Deb	Debshankar Halder
2023	Mayukh Naame Ekhane Keu Thake Na	Kathak, Sydney, Australia	Tito Ray	Dibyendu Dasgupta
2024	Je Nodi Morupothe	[Baghajatin Alaap]	Rudrarup Mukhopadyay	
2024	Kittonkhola	Bay Area Amateur Thespians, San Francisco, USA	Parthapratim Deb	Selim Al Deen
2025	Jay Jayanti	Epic Actors' Workshop, New Jersey, USA at the 20th South Asian Theatre Festival 2025	Parthapratim Deb	Parthapratim Deb, adapted from The Good Person of Szechwan by Bertolt Brecht
2026	Padma Nodir Majhi	Baghajatin Alaap	Parthapratim Deb	Parthapratim Deb, adapted from Padma Nodir Majhi by Manik Bandyopadhyay
