= Culture of Kolkata =

The culture of Kolkata concerns the music, art, museums, festivals, and lifestyle within Kolkata. It is the former capital of India and, as of 2021, the capital of the Indian state of West Bengal. Geir Heierstad writes that Bengalis tend to have a special appreciation for art and literature.

== Arts ==
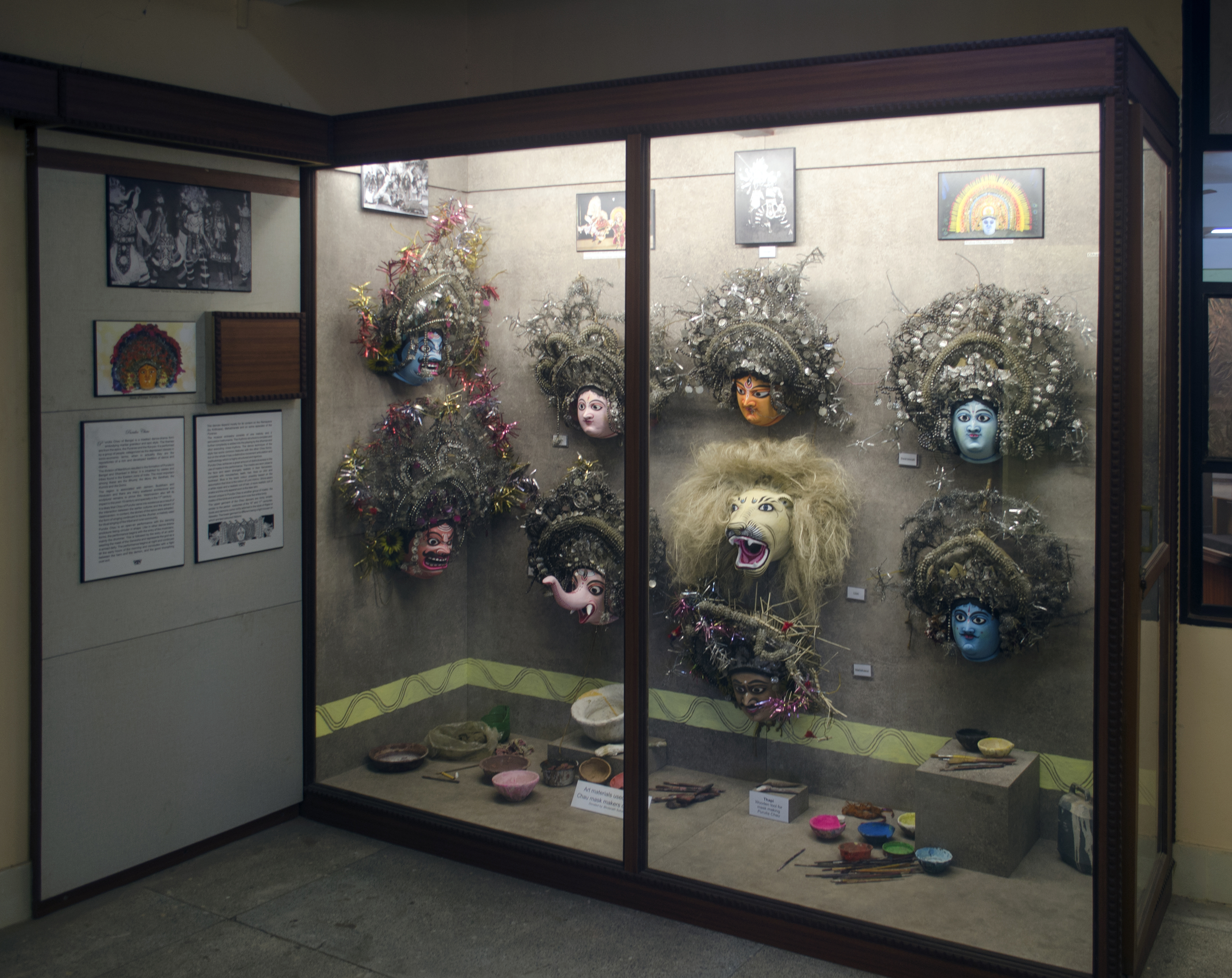
Chau Mask in Kolkata Theatre Museum Folk Gallery

The city has a long tradition of commercial theatres and group theatres. As opposed to commercial theatres, group theatres usually do not have any profit making agenda. Group theatre activists use the proscenium stage to portray some social message. The commercial theatres of the city, however, has been declining in popularity since the 1980s, and only a handful of commercial theatre productions are made, as of 2009.

Notable group theatres include the Little Theatre Group, Gandharba, Calcutta Theatre, Nandikar, Bahurupee etc. and movements like the Indian People's Theatre Association (IPTA). Famous drama and theatrics personalities include Ajitesh Bandyopadhyay, Utpal Dutta, Rudraprasad Sengupta and Shambhu Mitra.

== Architecture ==
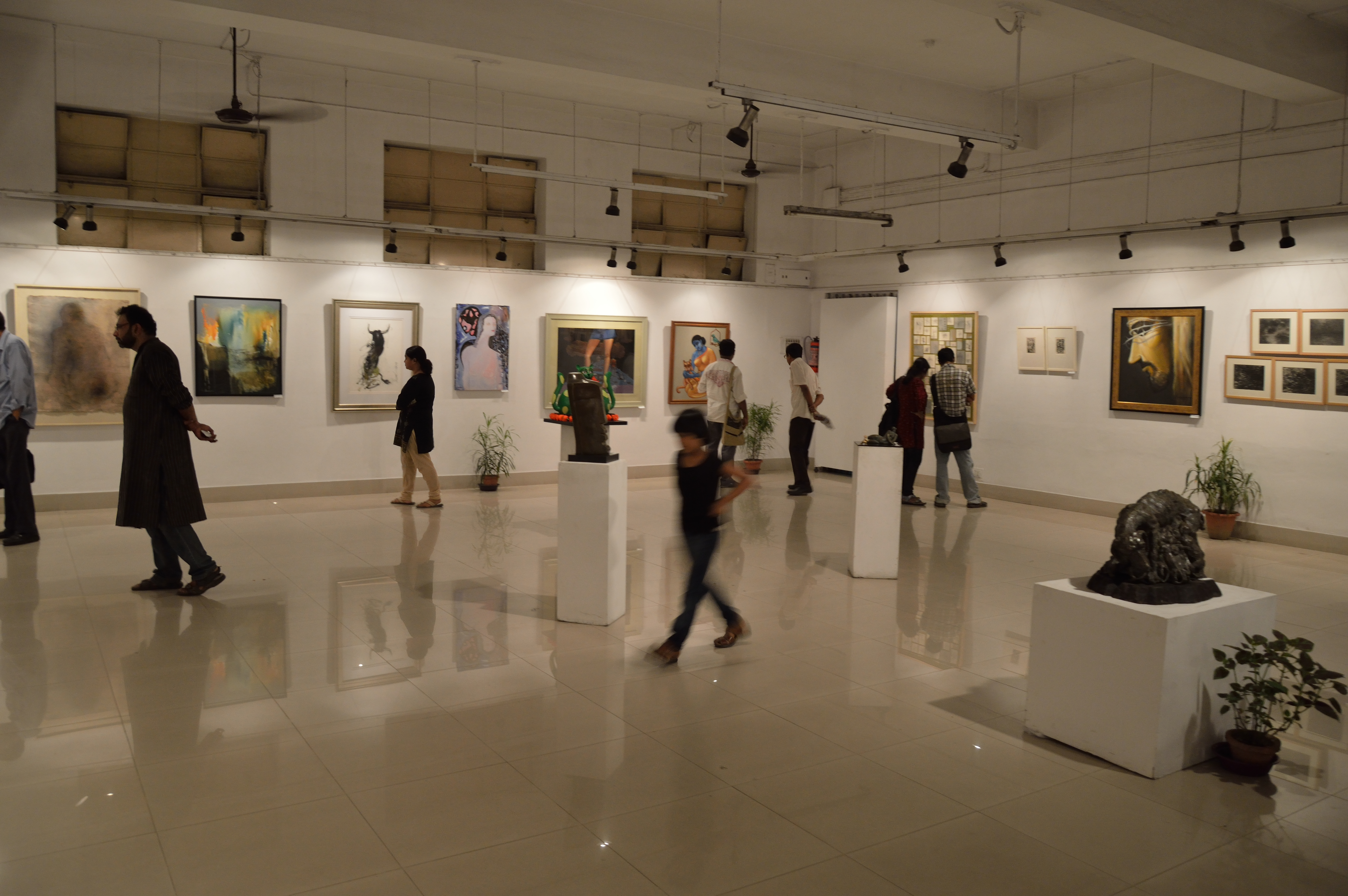
An exhibition of painting and sculpture is going on at the Academy of Fine Arts, Kolkata.

Kolkata has buildings adorned with Indo-Islamic and Indo-Saracenic architectural motifs. Several well-maintained major buildings from the colonial period have been declared "heritage structures"; however, others are in various stages of decay. Established in 1814 as the nation's oldest museum, the Indian Museum houses large collections that showcase Indian natural history and Indian art. Marble Palace is a classic example of a European mansion that was built in the city. The Victoria Memorial, a place of interest in Kolkata, has a museum documenting the city's history.

Kalighat painting originated in the 19th century Kolkata, in the vicinity of Kalighat Kali Temple of Kalighat. Initially sold as items of souvenir taken by the visitors to the Kali temple, the paintings over a period of time developed as a distinct school of Indian painting. From the depiction of Hindu gods, goddesses, and other mythological characters, the Kalighat paintings developed to reflect a variety of themes including quotidian life. The Academy of Fine Arts and other art galleries hold regular art exhibitions. The Government College of Art and Craft, founded in 1864, has been the cradle as well as workplace of eminent artists including Abanindranath Tagore, Jamini Roy, and Nandalal Bose. The art college was the birthplace of Bengal school of art that arose as an avant garde and nationalist movement reacting against the prevalent academic art styles.

== Sports ==
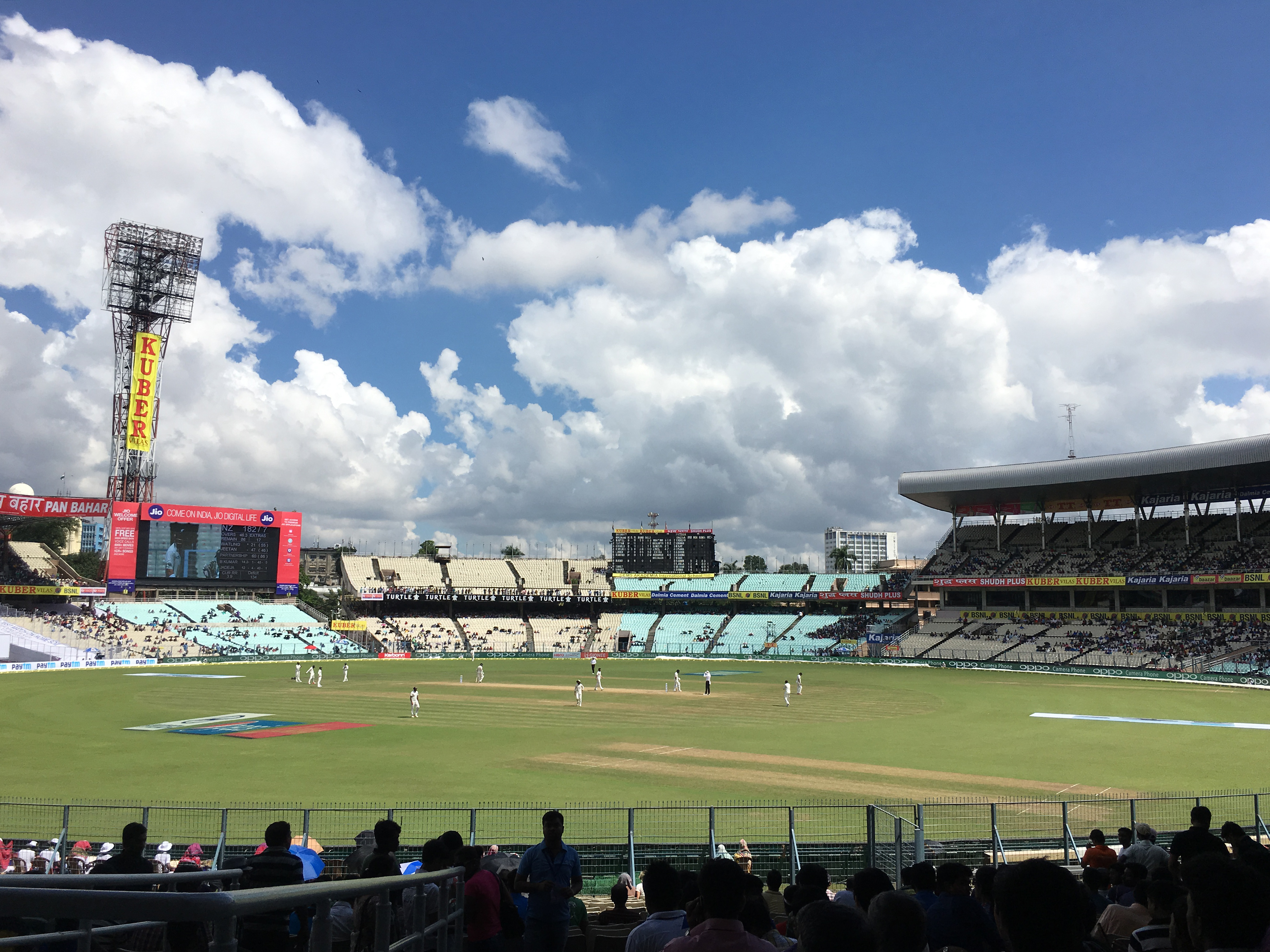
Eden Gardens, Kolkata

The people of Kolkata are famous for being sports lovers. Cricket and football can easily be called the life blood of the city. The home town of Eden Gardens (headquarters of CAB), the city can boast of an impartial crowd of cricket lovers who cheer for good cricket even when their side is losing. Eden Gardens is one of the biggest stadiums in the country in terms of capacity and witnessed its first test match from 5 to 8 January 1934.

== Exhibitions ==
Kolkata is a city of exhibitions and fairs. The International History & Heritage Exhibition organised by Sabarna Sangrahashala annually in February is an important event where the rich cultural heritage of the land is reflected. Apart from the history and heritage of India, the exhibition through displays of rarest artifacts and documents portrays the history, traditions and culture of other nations too. The exhibition attracts visitors from all over the world.

== See also ==
- Cinema of West Bengal
- Music of Bengal
- Kalighat painting
