= Mantramugdha =

1977 Bengali film

Mantramugdha is a Bengali comedy drama film directed by Arabinda Mukhopadhyay based on the novel of Balai Chand Mukhopadhyay. This film was released in 1977 under the banner of K. L. Kapoor Films. Hemanta Mukherjee was the music director of the film.

== Plot ==
Shubhankari, a very superstitious woman who always tries to controls her husband, Haradhan. Haradhan has a passion for acting in theatre. Due to such family disturbance Haradhan plans with his friend Dhanu to avoid his wife. They trick her into believing that through a supernatural curse her husband became a dog. Shubhankari's Panic and confusion creates a huge comedy.

== Cast ==
- Soumitra Chatterjee
- Sabitri Chatterjee
- Utpal Dutt
- Ranjit Mallick
- Rabi Ghosh
- Sumitra Mukherjee
- Jennifer Babynal
- Shambhu Bhattacharya
- Biplab Chatterjee
- Gita Dey
- Mrinal Mukherjee
- Sobha Sen
