= Partho Mukherjee =

Indian film actor

- Born: 21 September 1947; Calcutta, West Bengal, India
- Died: 25 December 2017 (aged 70)
- Occupation: Actor
- Years active: 1958–2017

Partho Mukherjee (Hindi: पार्थ मुखर्जी; Bengali: পার্থ মুখার্জী) was an Indian actor who worked in Bengali cinema mainly as supporting actor. He worked in movies like Dhanyee Meye, Agnishwar, Amar Prithivi, Bagh Bondi Khela. He was particularly known for his boy-next-door looks. He worked with actors like Sabitri Chatterjee, Ranjit Mallick, Uttam Kumar, Soumitra Chatterjee etc. Beside acting in films, he was also a passionate singer.

== Early life and education ==
Partho Mukherjee was born on 21 September 1947 in Kolkata, West Bengal. After passing Higher Secondary Examination from Chakraberia Higher Secondary School of Kolkata he studied B.Com at Charuchandra College in 1965 and later enrolled for M.Com at the Calcutta University but could not appear for exams due to the film offers.

== Struggling days ==
After getting a break as a child actor in the film Maa directed by Chitta Basu in 1958 he portrayed a number of memorable roles in the 1960s. Based on Rabindranath Tagore's cult short story Atithi Tapan Sinha cast him as the protagonist in Bengali film Atithi. Partho Mukherjee also acted in Tapan Sinha's Bengali movie Apanjan. Known to carry himself well in both comedy, serious and tragic roles, Mukherjee was at one time an automatic choice as Bengal film legend Uttam Kumar's on-screen brother or son in several Bengali movies. He acted more than 100 Bengali movies.

== Personal life ==
He married music director Ashima Bhattacharya in 1977, who composed the music for the Bengali language film Chowringhee.

== Death ==
He died of cardiac arrest at the age of 70.

== Awards and nominations ==
Mukherjee got wide recognition for his role in Tapan Sinha's Bengali movie 'Atithi' adapted from Rabindranath Tagore's short story. The movie participated in Venice Film Festival f but missed the best actor award with just a few votes. The TMC lead state government had conferred Partho Mukhopadhyay with a special award for his contribution to Bengali film industry.

== Selected filmography ==
1. Maa (1958)
2. Atithi (1965)
3. Galpo Holeo Satti (1966) as Alok
4. Balika Badhu (1967),
5. Hatey Bazarey (1967)
6. Apanjan (1968)
7. Dhanyee Meye (1971), as Bogola
8. Ajker Nayak (1972)
9. Agnishwar (1975)
10. Bagh Bondi Khela (1975)
11. Faraar (1975)
12. Sei Chokh (1976) as Amal
13. Dampati (1976)
14. Joy Maa Tara (1978)
15. Dui Purush(1978)
16. Ghatkali (1979) (as Partho Mukhopadhyay)
17. Paar (film) (1984) (Hindi)
18. Amar Prithivi (1985)
19. Abasheshe (1985)
20. Pyar Jhukta Nahin (1985) (Hindi)
21. Rehguzar (1985)
22. Chheleta (1986)(as Partho Mukhopadhyay)
23. Naan Adimai Illai (1986) (Tamil)
24. Abhagini (1991)
25. Purander

== Television ==
He acted in several TV serials.
