= Goutam Halder =

Indian actor and director

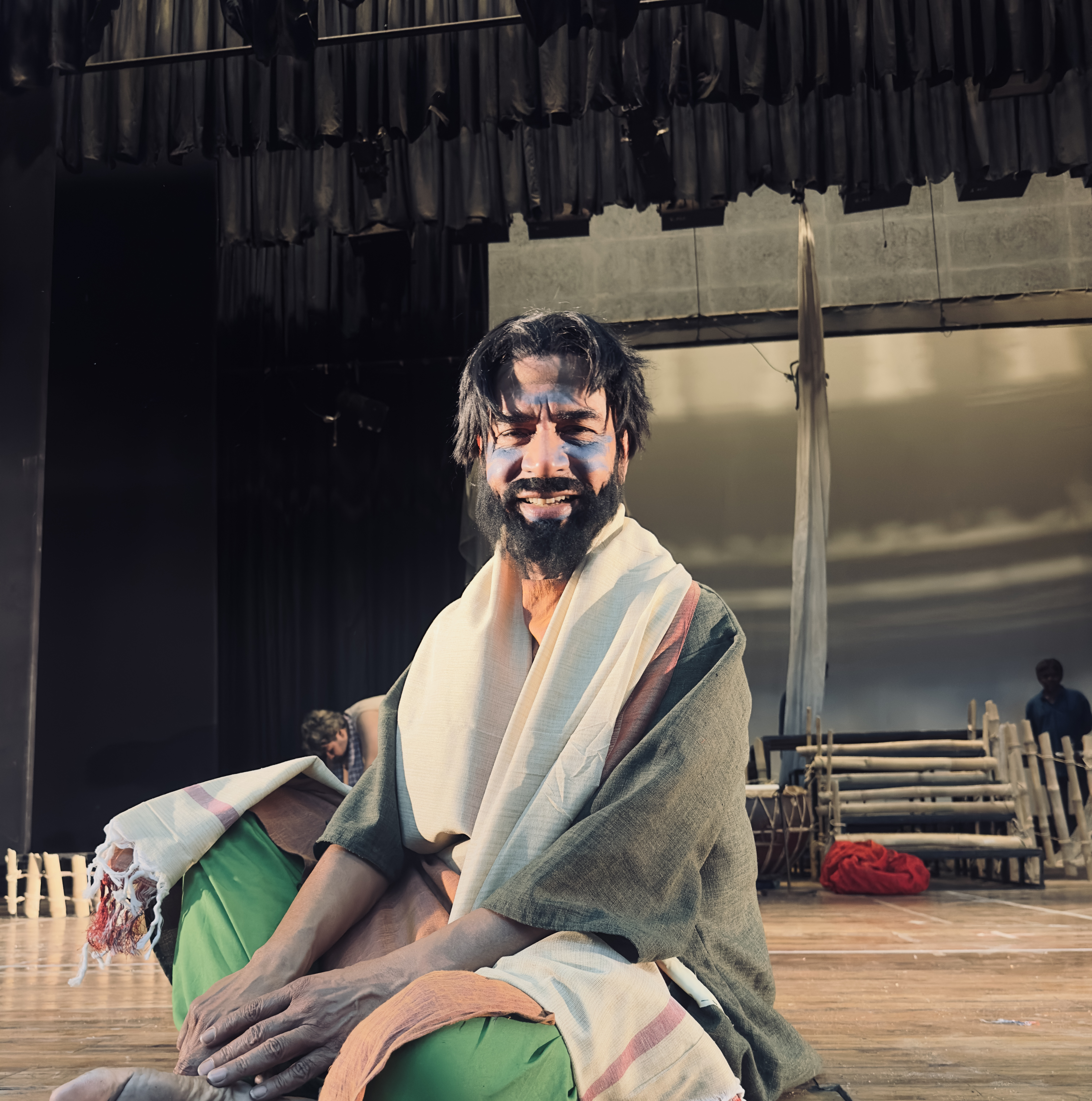
- Halder in the play Sojon Badiyar Ghat
- Born: December 9, 1963 (age 62); Calcutta, India
- Education: Ramakrishna Mission Vivekananda Centenary College
- Occupation: Actor
- Organization: Naye Natua
- Spouses: Sohini Sengupta (div. 2006) Dyuti Ghosh Halder (m. 2010)

Goutam Halder (born 9 December 1963) is an Indian theatre and film actor from Kolkata. He has appeared in more than 50 theatrical productions since 1981 across various troupes, and is the recipient of several accolades including a State Award of Best Production for Meghnad Badh Kabya in 1995, State Award as Best Director for Chile Kothar Sepai in 1997, Aditya Vikram Birla Kala Kiran Award by Government of Maharasthra in 2001 and Shyamal Sen Smriti Samman in 2013.

After graduating from Ramakrishna Mission Vivekananda Centenary College, Rahara Goutam Halder followed his heart into theatrical pursuits where he started gaining tutelage in Nandikar’s Comprehensive Theatre Training, 1986-87 where he gained knowledge, experience and practice under stalwarts like Rudraprasad Sengupta (Guru), Shombhu Mitra (Theatre legend), Khaled Chowdhury(Acclaimed scenographer), Tapas Sen (renowned Lighting Designer), Martin Russell (Fools Theatre, New York) among others.

Halder’s career began with his portrayal of Jaisingha in Bisarjan at Bhatpara Sanskritik Chakra which had been directed by Hara Bhattacharya. After completion of his training programme at Nandikar, he went on to direct and act in plays like Football (1986), Shesh Shakkhatkar (1988), Pheriwalar Mrityu(1993), Meghnad Badh Kabya (1995), Nagar Kirtan (1997), Sojon Badiyar Ghat (2003) among multiple others, under the banner of Nandikar. In 2009, he formed his own troupe Naye Natua which has also produced multiple successful plays. He is the President of the troupe.

== Early life and personal life ==
Halder was born on 9 December 1963 in, Bhatpara, West Bengal, India. He has a younger brother. He graduated from Ramakrishna Mission Vivekananda Centenary College, Rahara.

He has been trained in Kathak at Padatik Dance Centre under Guru Vijay Shankar. He has also dedicatedly learnt Bharatnatyam in Kerala Kalamandalam under Guru Govindan Kutty and Thankamani Kutty. He has been learning Modern dance and Movement and Martial Arts under Guru Sudipta Kundu since 2000. He has also trained himself in Classical vocal music under Guru Ashis Chattopadhyay and Guru Prabir Datta since 1986.

== Performing arts career ==
After completion of his Graduation, Halder began his career at Nandikar with the play Football (1986), directed by Rudraprasad Sengupta where he played the lead role of Hari. Following his start, he starred in other plays directed by Rudraprasad Sengupta like Shesh Shakkhatkar (1988), Sankhapurer Sukanya (1990) and Pheriwalar Mrityu (1993). Apart from Nandikar, Goutam Halder has also worked with other troupes and played significant and leading roles in their productions. They include Mephisto (2002), Shah Jahan (Natyaranga, 2003), Meyeti (Kalyani Natyacharcha Kendra, 2008), Dream Dream (Sansriti, 2009), Bisarjan (Tritiyo Sutra, 2010), Itsy Bitsy (Hate Khori, 2012), Caligula (Prachyo, 2013), Altaf Gomes (Sansriti, 2013), Arabya Rajani (Paikpara Indraranga, 2014), Mumbai Nights (Minerva Repertoire Theatre, 2015), Kalkreta (Swapnalu, 2015), Ila Gurdhoisha (Theatre Platform, 2015), Nilima (Prachyo, 2016), Mudrarakhshash (Belgharia Angan, 2016) and Chayapother Seshe (Natyorongo, 2023).

=== Theatrical Career as an actor and director ===
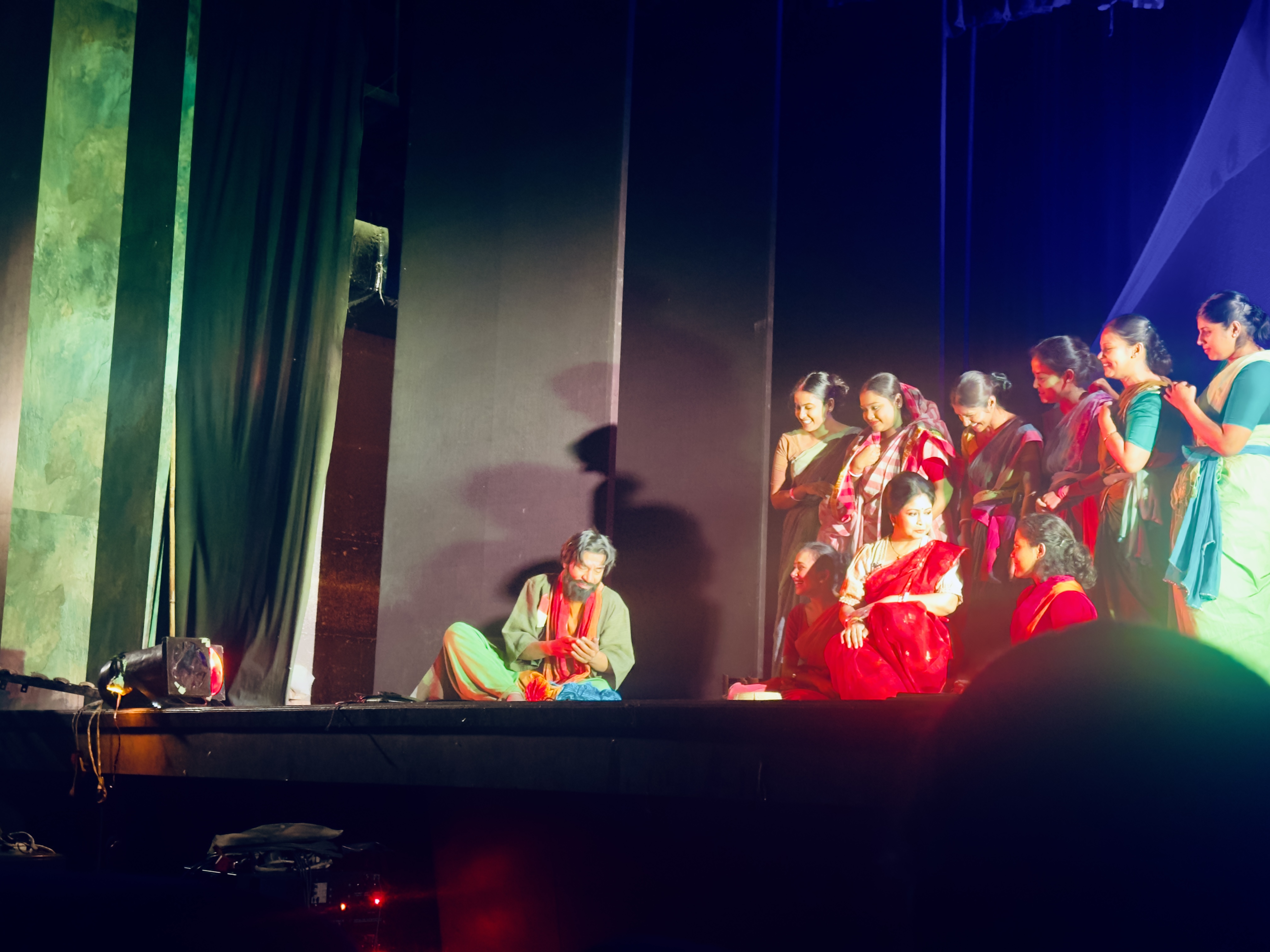
Goutam Halder, Dyuti Halder, and other artists in a scene during the production of the play Sojon Badiyar Ghat in Kolkata on 8th March 2026

Goutam Halder made his directorial debut in Nandikar with Meghnadbadh Kabya in 1995, followed by Nagar Kirtan (1997), Brechter Khonje (1998), Calcutta Calcutta (1999), Ei Sahar Ei Somoy (2000), Maramiya Mon (2000), Borda (2002), Kabye Gaane (2002), Sojon Badiyar Ghat (2003) and Amake Dekhun (2007). He has also played the lead role in the following plays as well. After forming his own troupe, Naye Natua in 2009, he directed and acted in Jaal (2009), followed by plays like Jama Kharach (2009), Missed Call (2009), Meghnadbadh Kabya (2009, revived), Borda (2009, revived), Amake Dekhun (2009, revival), Osama (2012), Lakshmir Pariksha (2012), Nana Range Rabi (2012), Othello (2013), Haoai (2015), Thakurmar Jhuli (2015), Moimonsingha Geetika (2017), Mrichchhakatika (2018), Nakshi Kathar Math (2020), Mitali (2022) and Doosra (2024).

Career as a film actor: Goutam Halder has acted in films like Tadanto (dir. Nitish Roy), Alinagarer Golokdhadha (dir. Sayantan Ghoshal), Maya Mridanga (dir. Raja Sen), Shri Swapankumarer Badami Hyenar Kobole (dir. Debaloy Bhattacharya), Badnaam (dir.Nitish Mukherjee), Tara (dir. Bratya Basu), Artha (dir. Anjan Dutt) and Imaginary Line (dir. Josey Joseph).

=== Lectures and Workshops ===
Halder has given lectures at Georgia University, Athens, Georgia, USA, Edinburgh Theatre Festival, Scotland and International Dance & Theatre Festival, Goteborg, Sweden. Halder has also conducted various theatre workshops such as Naye Natua’s Theatre Training Programme, Nandikar’s annual Theatre Training Programme for the Young, Nandikar’s Theatre-in-Education Programmes in Secondary Schools since 1989, Nandikar’s Project In Search of Children’s Theatre, Trainer at BLP for Murugappa Group of Industries, Chennai, Trainer-Judge at British Council Theatre Festival among various others. He has also conducted various workshops at various others troupes all over India.

== Goutam Halder on stage and screen ==
=== Stage ===
Sl No	Year	Production	Story / Poet / Playwright / Translator / Adaptor	Director	Role	Group
1	1981	Bisarjan	Rabindranath Tagore	Hara Bhattacharya	Jaisingha	Sanskritik Chakra, Bhatpara
2	1982	Ekjan Siddhartha Mitra Bujhte Parchen	Henrik Ibsen / Hara Bhattacharya	Hara Bhattacharya	Siddhartha	Sanskritik Chakra, Bhatpara
3	1982	Samadhan	Bertolt Brecht / Utpal Dutt	Hara Bhattacharya	People	Sanskritik Chakra, Bhatpara
4	1984	Danab	Yvgeny Shwartz / Ashok Mukhopadhyay	Bidyut Nag	Pagriwalla	Prayas
5	1986	Football	Peter Terson / Rudraprasad Sengupta	Swatilekha and Rudraprasad Sengupta	Hari	Nandikar
6	1988	Shesh Sakkhatkar	Vladlen Dozortse / Rudraprasad Sengupta	Rudraprasad Sengupta	Dr. Karmakar	Nandikar
7	1990	Sankhapurer Sukanya	Bertolt Brecht / Rudraprasad Sengupta	Rudraprasad Sengupta	Yang Sung	Nandikar
8	1993	Pheriwalar Mrityu	Arthur Miller / Rudraprasad Sengupta	Rudraprasad Sengupta	Babu	Nandikar
9	1995	Meghnadbadh Kabya	Michael Madhusudan Dutt	Goutam Halder	Narrator	Nandikar
10	1996	Gotrahin	Arthur Miller / Rudraprasad Sengupta			Nandikar
11	1997	Nagar Kirtan	Koushik Roy Chowdhury, Goutam Halder	Goutam Halder	Narayan	Nandikar
12	1998	Brechter Khonje	Koushik Roy Chowdhury, Rudraprasad Sengupta	Goutam Halder	Lead Singer	Nandikar
13	1999	Calcutta Calcutta	Koushik Roy Chowdhury, Rudraprasad Sengupta, Shankha Ghosh, Joy Goswami	Goutam Halder	Lead Singer	Nandikar
14	2000	Ei Sahar Ei Samay	Swatilekha Sengupta, Rudraprasad Sengupta, Koushik Roy Chowdhury, Goutam Halder, Joy Goswami	Swatilekha Sengupta, Rudraprasad Sengupta, Goutam Halder	Lead Singer	Nandikar
15	2000	Maramiya Mon	Fyodor Dostoevsky / Rudraprasad Sengupta	Goutam Halder	Narrator	Nandikar
16	2001	Football (Revival)	Peter Tarson / Rudraprasad Sengupta	Swatilekha and Rudraprasad Sengupta	Hari	Nandikar
17	2002	Borda	Munshi Premchand	Goutam Halder	Narrator	Nandikar
18	2002	Kabye Gane	Rabindranath Tagore (collected folk rhymes), Buddhadeva Bose, Sankha Ghosh, Shakti Chattopadhyay, Joy Goswami, Koushik Roy Chowdhury, etc.	Goutam Halder	Narrator	Nandikar
19	2002	Mephisto	Ariel Muchkin / Suman Mukhopadhyay	Suman Mukhopadhyay	Henrik Hoffgen	Collective Enterprise
20	2003	Shah Jahan	Dwijendra Lal Roy	Swapan Sengupta	Shah Jahan	Natyaranga
21	2003	Sojon Badiyar Ghat	Jasimuddin	Goutam Halder	Sojon	Nandikar
22	2006	Rater Kutum	Ashapurna Devi	Collective	Nosu	Nandikar
23	2007	Amake Dekhun	Shirshendu Mukhopadhyay	Goutam Halder	The Man	Nandikar
24	2008	Meyeti	Ariel Dorfman	Kishore Sengupta	Roberto Miranda	Kalyani Natya Charcha Kendra
25	2009	Jal	Shirshendu Mukhopadhyay / Goutam Halder	Goutam Halder	Clerk	Naye Natua
26	2009	Jama Kharach	Shirshendu Mukhopadhyay / Goutam Halder	Goutam Halder	Mukhujje	Naye Natua
27	2009	Missed Call	Debshnakar Halder	Goutam Halder	Laltu	Naye Natua
28	2009	Meghnadbadh Kabya (Revival)	Michael Madhusudan Dutt	Goutam Halder	Narrator	Naye Natua
29	2009	Borda (Revival)	Munshi Premchand	Goutam Halder	Borda	Naye Natua
30	2009	Amake Dekhun (Revival)	Sirshendu Mukhopadhyay	Goutam Halder	The Man	Naye Natua
31	2009	Dream Dream	William Shakespeare / Partha Chatterjee	Goutam Halder	Ustad	Sansriti
32	2010	Bisarjan	Rabindranath Tagore	Suman Mukhopadhyay	Raghupati	Tritiyo Sutra
33	2012	Itsy Bitsy	Chiranjib Basu	Debasish Ghosh Dastidar	Somnath	Hate Khori
34	2012	Osama	Jean Paul Sartre / Goutam Halder	Goutam Halder	Osama	Naye Natua
35	2012	Lakshmir Pariksha	Rabindranath Tagore	Goutam Halder	Kshiro	Naye Natua
36	2012	Nana Ronge Rabi	Rabindranath Tagore	Goutam Halder		Naye Natua
37	2013	Caligula	Albert Camus	Biplab Bandopadhyay	Caligula	Prachyo
38	2013	Othello	William Shakespeare / Ratan Kumar Das	Goutam Halder	Othello	Naye Natua
39	2013	Mephisto (Renewal)	Ariel Muchkin / Suman Mukhopadhyay	Suman Mukhopadhyay	Henrik Hoffgen	Tritiyo Sutra
40	2013	Altaf Gomes	Bratya Basu	Debesh Chattopadhyay	Gomes	Sansriti
41	2014	Arabya Rajani	Ujjwal Chattopadhyay	Ujjwal Chattopadhyay	Nihswo	Paikpara Indraranga
42	2015	Haoai	Evald Flisar/ Ratan Kr. Das	Goutam Halder	Pintuda (Peter)	Naye Natua
43	2015	Thakurmar Jhuli	Dakshinaranjan Mitra Majumder	Goutam Halder	Narrator	Naye Natua
44	2015	Mumbai Nights	William Shakespeare /Debashis Roy	Bratya Basu	Malvolio	Minerva Repertoire Theatre
45	2015	Kalkreta	Premangshu Roy	Premangshu Roy	Raja	Swapnalu
46	2015	Ila Gurdhoisha	Bratya Basu	Debashis Roy	Birnarayan	Theatre Platform
47	2016	Nilima - based on Eugène Ionesco’s The Lesson	Eugène Ionesco	Biplab Bandopadhyay	Professor	Prachyo
48	2016	Mudrarakshash	Adaptation by Ratan Kumar Das	Biplab Bandopadhyay	Chanakya	Belgharia Angan
49	2017	Moimonsingha Geetika	Ballad by Dwija Kanai	Goutam Halder	Narrator/Humra	Naye Natua
50	2018	Mrichchhakatika	Shudrak	Goutam Halder		Naye Natua
51	2020	Nakshi Kanthar Math	Jasimuddin	Goutam Halder		Naye Natua
52	2022	Mitali	Story by Fyodor Dostoevsky/ Dramatization by Goutam Halder	Goutam Halder	Narrator	Naye Natua
53	2023	Chayapother Sheshe	Sohan Bandyopadhyay	Sohan Bandyopadhyay		Nataranga
54	2024	Doosra	Play by Evald Flisar/ Adaptation by Ratan kumar Das	Goutam Halder	Boss	Naye Natua
55	2025	Sojon Badiyar Ghat	Play based on a poem by Jasim Uddin	Goutam Halder	Sojon Badiya	Naye Natua

=== Film and Television ===
Year	Title	Role	Director
2017	Tadanta		

He also acted in Bengali movies and Television show directed by Bengali directors like Raja Sen, Nitish Roy. Rajendra Prasad Das, Subhendu Chakraborty,

- Shri Swapankumarer Badami Hyenar Kobole (2024) by Debaloy Bhattacharya
- Alinagarer Golokdhadha (2018) by Sayantan Ghosal * Maya Mridanga (2016) by Raja Sen (co actors - Rituparna Sengupta, Paoli Dam, Debshankar Halder) * Tadanto (2016) by Nitish Roy (co actors - Rahul Banerjee, Priyanka Sarkar, Rituparna Sengupta, Debshankar Halder, Kaushik Sen).
- Karunamoyee Rani Rashmoni (2017-2022)
- Mahapeeth Tarapeeth (2019-2022)

== Awards ==
- Awarded Scholarship by Department of Culture, Govt. of India (1993-1995)
- Awarded Junior Fellowship by Department of Culture, Govt. of India (1997-1998)
- Awarded Senior Fellowship by Department of Culture, Govt. of India (2004-2006)
- State Award of Best Production for Meghnad Badh Kabya in 1995
- State Award as Best Director for Chile Kothar Sepai in 1997
- Awarded Aditya Vikram Birla Kala Kiran Award (2001) by Government of Maharashtra
- Awarded Shyamal Sen Smriti Samman (2013) by Swapnasandhani – theatre troupe directed by eminent actor Koushik Sen.
