= Hindi cinema content lists =

This is a list of content of Hindi cinema.

- List of Hindi film actresses
- List of Hindi horror films
- List of Indian romance films
- List of Hindi film families
- List of Indian film music directors
- List of Indian music families
- List of Indian playback singers
- List of Hindi film actors
