= Nandikar's National Theatre Festival =

Nandikar's National Theatre Festival was started in 1984. It is arranged annually in Kolkata, India, between 16 and 25 December. Initiated and organized, as the name suggest, by the theatre group Nandikar. The festival is held at the Academy of Fine Arts, Calcutta.

The stated twin objective for the festival is to facilitate cultural integration in India and providing a forum for exchange of notes among theatre workers from different parts of the country. However, the festival was initially a part of Nandikar's silver jubilee, but due to the good reception the group decided to turn it into an annual event.

The festival display productions by leading and avant-garde theatre troupes from all over India and, occasionally, from countries like United States, Sweden, Switzerland, Pakistan, Nepal and Bangladesh.

Exhibitions and workshops are also arranged in connection with the festival.

== See also ==
- Nandikar
