= Sanskrit Collegiate School =

School in Kolkata, West Bengal, India

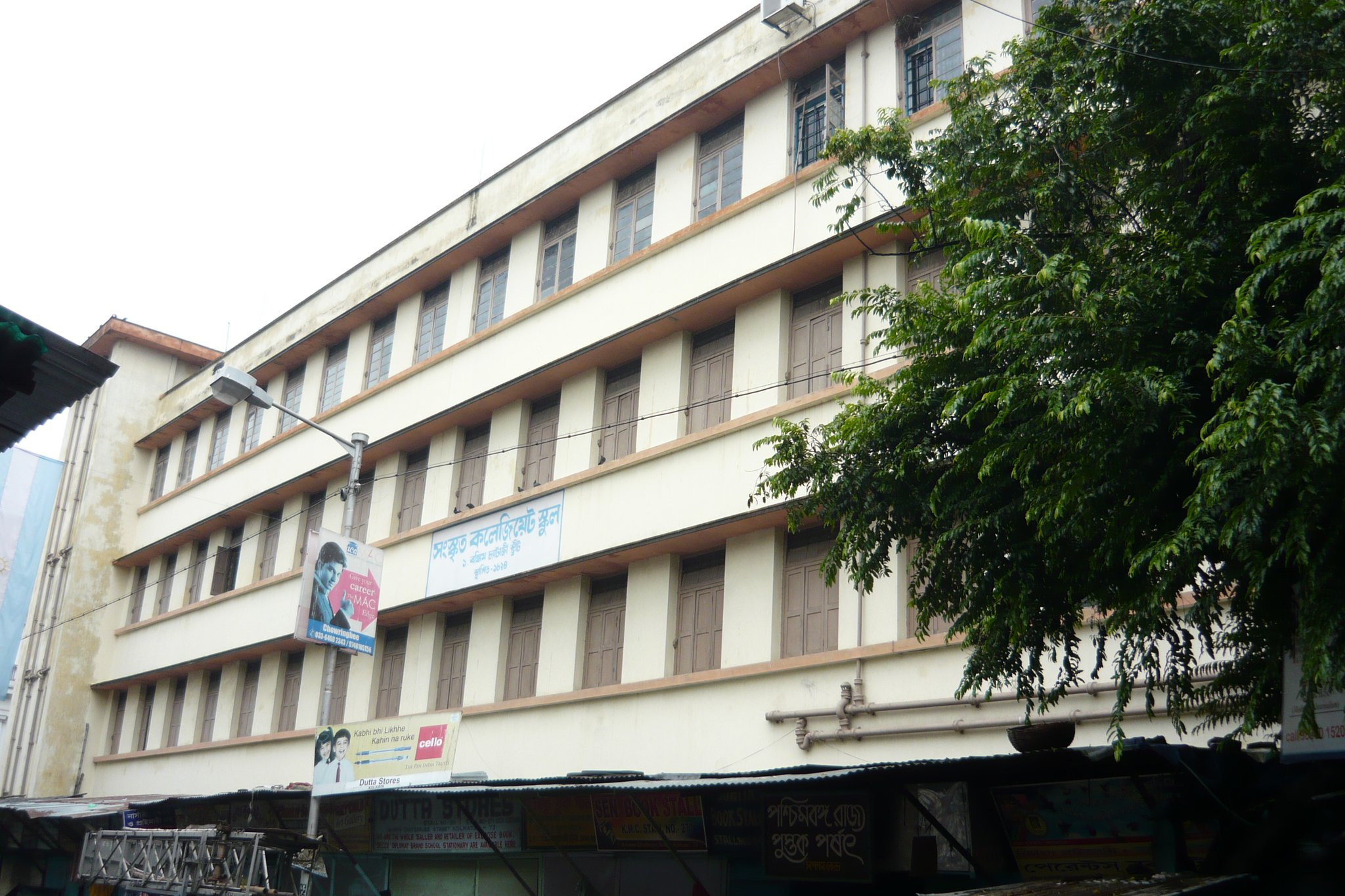
- School building

Location
- 1, Bankim Chatterjee Street; College Street; Kolkata, India, West Bengal, 700 073; India; 22.575697°N 88.363713°E

Information
- School type: Government School
- Motto: Sanskrit: तमसो मा ज्योतिर्गमय (From the darkness of ignorance lead me to the light of knowledge)
- Established: 1824; 202 years ago
- Authority: Government of West Bengal
- Headmaster: Debabrata Mukherjee
- Grades: I to XII
- Gender: Boys' only
- Age: 6 years to 19 years
- Language: Bengali, English, Sanskrit
- Colours: White and Olive Green
- Affiliations: WBBSE, WBCHSE
- Alumni: Ishwarchandra Vidyasagar, Haraprasad Shastri, Shibnath Shastri, Surendranath Dasgupta, Krishna Kanta Handique, Bimal Krishna Matilal, Abanindranath Tagore, J. C. Bhattacharyya, Bishnu Dey, Naba Krishna Bhattacharya

Sanskrit Collegiate School is one of the oldest schools in Kolkata, India. It runs teaching grades from class 1 to 12 under the West Bengal Board of Secondary Education and the West Bengal Council of Higher Secondary Education.

The boys-only (till 2022) school was established by the then Bengal intelligentsia along with Sanskrit College, Calcutta. Started on 1 January 1824, it is situated opposite the Presidency University, Kolkata, College Square and Hindu School, Kolkata and next to the University of Calcutta and Hare School. In 2022, the headmaster said that his proposal for making it a co-educational institution is likely to be approved.

== History ==
It is located on College Street in central Kolkata. Its centrality is heightened by its proximity to Presidency College (now Presidency University), Kolkata, the University of Calcutta, and the Indian Coffee House. It was established during the Governor-Generalship of Lord Amherst, based on a recommendation by HT James Prinsep and Thomas Babington Macaulay among others. The institution rose to prominence during the principalship by Ishwar Chandra Vidyasagar in 1851, who admitted students from other than the Brahmin caste. In particular the tol or traditional Indian training school model was incorporated as a department in the 1870s. In the pre-independence era, it was one of the finest seats of academic excellence in matters pertaining to Hinduism, eastern philosophy, ancient Indian history and ancient Indian languages like Pali and Prakrit. It is particularly well known for the contribution of its faculty and students in the social, cultural and religious transformation in nineteenth century Bengal in what came to be popularly regarded as the Bengal Renaissance. In terms of scholarship and intellectual output, it contributed hugely to enriching the knowledge of ancient Indian society and interpretation of ancient Indian texts.

== Campus ==
The combined campus of the Sanskrit Collegiate School and Sanskrit College is one of the largest in Kolkata. The ownership of the campus is a contentious issue, leading to conflicts about which parts of the ground the students can access, whether they can play in the college's field and whether they can use the gates of the college. Though the campus does not contain a playground, the students are free to use the field of Presidency College. The school was once combined with Sanskrit College and was situated in the same building which was built in a Victorian Architecture. Later a new four storied building has been built for the school.

== Students ==
As of March 2006, a total of around 600 students study in the school. Class 11 and 12 are divided into two 'streams' known as Science and Arts (Humanities).

== Faculty ==
As of March 2006 around 40 teachers are teaching in the school.

== Extracurricular Activities ==
A football tournament is held during the summer. Intra-section competitions as well as inter-section and inter-class ones ensure that almost every student gets a chance to play at the official tournament. During the winter, a cricket tournament of smaller scope is held.

The annual sports competition is held in two stages, a heat followed by the finals. The events include sprints (50 meters, 100 meters, 200 meters depending on different grades), shot put, long jump. The students engage in sports (mostly football with some playing cricket) during the recess (commonly called the tiffin period) which lasts for 20 minutes from Monday to Friday. There is no recess on Saturday (it is a half-day), while on Sunday the school is closed.

The annual prize distribution ceremony sees plays, vocational and instrumental music performed by the students as well as other cultural programs held at the Derozio Hall. During the year other smaller cultural programs take place in the school, mainly featuring Rabindra Sangeets.

The school participates in quiz contests, debates, extempores and yoga competitions.

The largest festival is the Saraswati Puja, which is organised by the students of the school. A science exhibition usually accompanies the two-day festival.

There is a controversy over whether the school should celebrate a religious festival like Saraswati Puja as it is under a constitutionally secular government, however students have tended to support holding the puja. As with most major religious festivals of Bengal, the puja can be said to transcend religious boundaries and become an almost secular signature of Bengali culture as a whole.

== Notable alumni ==
- Ishwarchandra Vidyasagar
- Surendranath Dasgupta
- Krishna Kanta Handique
- Bimal Krishna Matilal
- Abanindranath Tagore
- J. C. Bhattacharyya
- Sivanath Sastri
