= Arabinda Mukhopadhyay =

Indian filmmaker, film director and editor

- Born: 18 June 1919; Katihar, Bihar, Bengal Presidency, British India
- Died: 10 February 2016 (aged 96); Tollyganj, Calcutta, West Bengal, India
- Other name: Dhulu babu
- Occupation: Filmmaker
- Children: 3
- Parents: Satyacharan Mukhopadhyay (father); Mrinalini Devi (mother)

Arabinda Mukhopadhyay (18 June 1919 – 10 February 2016) was an Indian filmmaker, film director and editor, who directed all-time classics like Nishi Padma (1970), Dhanyee Meye (1971), Mouchak (1974) and Agnishwar (1975). He also wrote stories and screenplays.

== Early life and education ==
Mukhopadhyay was born in Katihar district Katihar in Bihar on 18 June 1919. His family originally hailed from Sehakhala situated in Hooghly District of present-day West Bengal. His father, Satyacharan Mukhopadhyay, was a doctor, and his mother was Mrinalini Devi. His elder brother was the noted Bengali writer Balai Chand Mukhopadhyay.

== Career ==
In a career spanning four decades, he directed total 26 full-length films, 3 telefilms and 1 television serial. His very first directorial effort "Kichukkhon" in 1959 give him a nomination for the president's award. Another movie of his, "Ahban", was screened at the Cannes Film Festival in 1961. His inspiration was Bengali Filmmakers like Agradoot, Debaki Bose, Bimal Roy, Niren Lahiri, Ajoy Kar.

== Death ==
Mukhopadhyay died on February 10, 2016, at his Kolkata residence.

== Awards and nominations ==
- Ahban movie nominated at Cannes Film Festival in 1961
- National Film Award nominated for Best Bengali Movie(1970) for Nishi Padma.
- 1970 National Film Awards- Best Male Playback Singer: Manna Dey - "Ja Khushi Ora Bole" Best Female Playback Singer: Sandhya Mukherjee - "Ore Sakol Sona Molin Holo.
- 20th Filmfare Awards (1972) for Best Screenplay - Movie Amar Prem

== Selected filmography ==
1. Kichukkhan (1959)
2. Ahban (1961)
3. Jeevan Sangeet (1968)
4. Pita Putra (1969)
5. Nishipadma (1970)
6. Dhanyee Meye (1971)
7. Mouchak (1974)
8. Agnishwar (1975)
9. Ajasra Dhanyabad (1976)
10. Mantramugdha (1977)
11. Ae Prithibi Pantha Niwas (1977)
12. Nadi Theke Sagare (1978)
13. Paka Dekha (1980)
14. Prayashchitta (1983)
15. Sansarer Itikatha (1983)
16. Arpita (1983)
17. Ajante (1986)
18. Barnachora
19. Kenram Becharam
20. Natun Jiban
21. Nayikar Bhumkay

== See also ==
- Aniket Chattopadhyay
