= Ajitesh Bandopadhyay =

Indian actor, playwright, activist and director (1933–1983)

- Born: 30 September 1933; Ropogram, Purulia District, West Bengal, India
- Died: 13 October 1983 (aged 50); Calcutta, West Bengal, India
- Occupations: actor; playwright; activist; director
- Parents: Bhubhanmohan Bandopadhyay (father); Lakshmi Rani Devi (mother)

Ajitesh Bandopadhyay (Bengali: অজিতেশ বন্দ্যোপাধ্যায়; born: 30 September 1933 ― 13 October 1983) was an Indian actor, playwright, activist and director. He along with Shambhu Mitra and Utpal Dutt are considered to be the doyens of Bengali theatre of the post - Independence era.

== Early life ==
He was born as Ajit, at Ropogram in Purulia District, West Bengal at his maternal uncle's house. His native village was Kenda situated in the Raniganj region of Paschim Bardhaman district, West Bengal. He was the eldest son of coal miner Bhubhanmohan and Lakshmirani.

Having graduated from Maharaja Manindra Chandra College, Kolkata, he taught for a few years in the same college and in South Point School before plunging himself into the world of theatre by joining the Nandikar group in 1960.

== Theatre ==
Before joining Nandikar, he had been in close touch with the IPTA (Indian Peoples' Theatre Association) and was both directing and performing a number of its stage productions. While with Nandikar, Ajitesh along with Rudraprasad Sengupta, Asit Bandopadhyay and Keya Chakrabarty, staged and performed many successful plays - mostly adaptations of Chekhov, Sophocles, Luigi Pirandello and such stalwarts; of these, few like Antigone, Teen Poysar Pala (adapted from Three Penny Opera), Manjari Aamer Manjari (adapted from Cherry Orchard) not only drew large audiences but created milestones of success even at the national level. Plays like Bhalomanusher Pala and Sher Afgan met with the same success. As a recognition of his directorial ventures and contribution to theatre, he was honored with the Sangeet Natak Academy Award in 1976 at the age of 42, one of the youngest recipients of this nationally prestigious award. In the early 1970s, he was described by none other than Sombhu Mitra as the "most powerful performer of the Bengal theatre in current times". In 1977, he left Nandikar and formed his theatrical group Nandimukh through which he continued his stage productions and performances with equal aplomb.

== Film ==
At the same time, his performance on the silver screen, particularly as a character actor, in films like Haate Bajare, Chhuti, Atithi, Kuheli followed by Ganadevata, Aaj Kaal Porshur Galpo, Aarohi (film), Megh o Roudra, Thagini, Nidhiram Sardar, Hire Manik, Kapalkundala, Samjhauta (in Hindi) established him as a powerful thespian of the stage and screen.

He was actively involved with radio plays and Jatra also.

An instance of his integrity and devotion is found when he left his teaching career to be cast for the role of the antagonist in Haate Bajare Directed by Tapan Sinha stating that his acting might negatively impact the young minds.

== Death ==
His untimely demise (at the age of 50) left a void, especially in Bengal theatre, which is, perhaps, still felt by one and many.
