= List of Indian romance films =

This is a list of notable Indian romance films.

== Hindi films ==
Year	Name
1949	Barsaat
1957	Pyaasa
1958	Madhumati
1960	Mughal-e-Azam
1964	Sangam
1971	Pyar Ki Kahani
1973	Bobby
1975	Mili
1976	Kabhie Kabhie
1976	Laila Majnu
1978	Satyam Shivam Sundaram
1978	Chhoti Si Baat
1978	Ankhiyon Ke Jharokhon Se
1980	Khwab
1981	Silsila
1982	Prem Rog
1988	Qayamat Se Qayamat Tak
1989	Love Love Love
1989	Maine Pyar Kiya
1989	Chandni
1990	Tum Mere Ho
1990	Dil
1990	Aashiqui
1991	Saajan
1991	Dil Hai Ki Manta Nahin
1992	Raju Ban Gaya Gentleman
1992	Deewana
1992	Dil Aashna Hai
1993	Hum Hain Rahi Pyar Ke
1994	Kabhi Haan Kabhi Naa
1994	Hum Aapke Hain Koun..!
1994	Yeh Dillagi
1995	Dilwale Dulhania Le Jayenge
1995	Guddu
1995	Rangeela
1996	Chaahat
1996	Raja Hindustani
1997	Dil To Pagal Hai
1997	Yes Boss
1997	Pardes
1997	Ishq
1997	Deewana Mastana
1998	Dil Se..
1998	Kuch Kuch Hota Hai
1998	Pyaar To Hona Hi Tha
1999	Taal
1999	Mann
1999	Hum Dil De Chuke Sanam
1999	Hum Aapke Dil Mein Rehte Hain
1999	Silsila Hai Pyar Ka
2000	Mohabbatein
2000	Dhadkan
2000	Kahin Pyaar Na Ho Jaaye
2000	Karobaar: The Business of Love
2000	Har Dil Jo Pyar Karega
2000	Badal
2000	Dulhan Hum Le Jayenge
2001	Rehnaa Hai Terre Dil Mein
2001	Chori Chori Chupke Chupke
2002	Devdas
2002	Hum Tumhare Hain Sanam
2002	Saathiya
2003	Chalte Chalte
2003	Kal Ho Naa Ho
2003	Tere Naam
2003	Ishq Vishk
2004	Veer-Zaara
2004	Hum Tum
2004	Fida
2004	Dil Maange More!!!
2005	Parineeta
2005	Salaam Namaste
2005	Silsiilay
2005	Socha Na Tha
2006	Kabhi Alvida Naa Kehna
2006	Aap Ki Khatir
2006	Vivah
2006	Fanaa
2006	I See You
2007	Om Shanti Om
2007	Jab We Met
2007	Salaam-e-Ishq
2007	Namastey London
2008	Ghajini
2008	Jaane Tu... Ya Jaane Na
2008	Kismat Konnection
2008	Rab Ne Bana Di Jodi
2008	Jodhaa Akbar
2009	Ajab Prem Ki Ghazab Kahani
2009	Love Aaj Kal
2009	Kurbaan
2009	Love Khichdi
2010	Anjaana Anjaani
2010	Band Baaja Baaraat
2010	Milenge Milenge
2011	Always Kabhi Kabhi
2011	Love Breakups Zindagi
2011	Bodyguard
2011	Mausam
2012	Ekk Deewana Tha
2012	Jab Tak Hai Jaan
2012	Makkhi
2012	Teri Meri Kahaani
2012	Jannat 2
2012	Student of the Year
2013	Issaq
2013	Raanjhanaa
2013	Aashiqui 2
2013	Goliyon Ki Raasleela Ram-Leela
2013	Ramaiya Vastavaiya
2014	Ek Villain
2014	2 States
2014	Heropanti
2014	CityLights
2015	Badlapur
2015	Dum Laga Ke Haisha
2015	Dilwale
2015	Masaan
2015	Bajirao Mastani
2016	Sairat
2016	Sanam Teri Kasam
2016	Do Lafzon Ki Kahani
2016	Sultan
2017	Bareilly Ki Barfi
2017	Angrezi Mein Kehte Hain
2017	Shubh Mangal Saavdhan
2017	Kaabil
2017	Half Girlfriend
2018	96
2018	RX 100
2018	Love Per Square Foot
2018	Kedarnath
2018	Genius
2019	Ek Ladki Ko Dekha Toh Aisa Laga

== Gujarati films ==
Year	Name
2006	Ek Var Piyu Ne Malva Aavje
2016	Romance Complicated
2017	Love Ni Bhavai
2017	Hameer
2018	Sharato Lagu

== Marathi films ==
Year	Name
2010	Mumbai-Pune-Mumbai
2015	Mumbai-Pune-Mumbai 2
2016	Sairat
2017	Ti Saddhya Kay Karte
2017	Chi Va Chi Sau Ka
2017	Ranjan
2017	Deva
2018	Asehi Ekada Vhave

== Tamil films ==
Year	Name
1980	Johny
1982	Moondram Pirai
1986	Mouna Ragam
1992	Roja
1995	Bombay
1997	Kadhalukku Mariyadhai
2000	Alaipayuthey
2001	Minnale
2004	7G Rainbow Colony
2006	Sillunu Oru Kaadhal
2010	Vinnaithaandi Varuvaayaa
2012	3
2013	Raja Rani
2021	Agni kadhal-Maagniyin kadhal kaviyam

== Telugu films ==
Year	Name
2018	Geetha Govindam
2019	Dear Comrade

== See also ==
- List of Indian comedy films
- List of Indian horror films
- Bollywood content lists
