= Atithi (1965 film) =

- Directed by: Tapan Sinha
- Screenplay by: Tapan Sinha
- Based on: Atithi by Rabindranath Tagore
- Starring: Ajitesh Bandopadhyay; Partho Mukherjee; Samita Biswas
- Cinematography: Dilip Ranjan Mukhopadhyay
- Edited by: Subodh Roy
- Music by: Tapan Sinha
- Production company: New Theatres Pvt. Ltd.
- Release date: 1965
- Running time: 112 minutes
- Country: India
- Language: Bengali

Atithi (literally The Guest; also known by the alternative English title The Runaway) is a 1965 Bengali drama film based on a short story by Rabindranath Tagore, and directed by Tapan Sinha. It tells a simple story about a teenage boy who prefers the life of a wanderer to the confines of a domestic life. At the 13th National Film Awards, it won the National Award (Certificate of Merit) for the Second Best Feature Film. It also won several BFJA Awards. It was India's competitive entry at the Venice International Film Festival in 1966, where it was nominated for the Golden Lion. The film was remade in Hindi as Geet Gaata Chal.

== Synopsis ==
Tarapada is a teenage boy who lives in a Bengal village with his mother and elder brother. To their exasperation, he often runs away from home for days on end. He has a wanderlust which makes him join groups of wandering players, musicians and acrobats. On his last flight he meets Moti Babu, a wealthy aristocrat who is returning by boat from a pilgrimage with his family. Tarapada takes a lift with them. On the boat, both Moti Babu and his wife Annapurna take a liking to the boy. Their only daughter, Charu, begins to feel jealous, which amuses Tarapada. He accompanies them to their home and soon becomes like a family member. Charu too accepts him as a companion. Moti Babu and Annapurna want to take the responsibility for his education. They think the relationship will be consolidated if the two young people get married. They write to Tarapada's mother, who is happy at the prospect of her son settling down. Tarapada, however, remains a free spirit and cannot be caged. He sets out once again on a voyage to an unknown destination.

== Cast ==
- Partho Mukherjee as Tarapada
- Ajitesh Bandopadhyay
- Samita Biswas as Tarapada's mother
- Geeta Mukherjee
- Basabi Banerjee as Charushashi
- Salil Dutta
- Bankim Ghosh
- Smita Sinha

== Production ==
Tapan Sinha interviewed "some two hundred and fifty lads" before he selected Partha Mukherjee to play the role of Tarapada. Sinha made him rehearse extensively for nearly two months for the film. For the role of Charu, he chose Basabi, the daughter of the well-known comic actor Bhanu Bandopadhyay, and got the two youngsters to rehearse together. Basabi recalls: "Both of us were very young when we did 'Atithi'. Partha would follow all instructions ... He and I, along with the whole unit of 'Atithi', went to Delhi to receive the National Award for the second best feature film from Indira Gandhi."

== Reception ==
Atithi, when released, was a commercial as well as a critical success. It won a National Award and several BFJA Awards, and was India's official competitive entry to the Venice Film Festival. According to one source, Partha Mukherjee missed the Best Actor award at Venice by just a few votes.

When asked about the film's success, Tapan Sinha said in an interview, "The greatest achievement was the hearty felicitations of millions of people - both from the intellectual circles and the common man."

Shampa Banerjee and Anil Srivastava include Atithi in their selection of 100 Indian feature films. They write: "What Sinha did for Tagore's simple tale was to recreate that elusive freedom that the human spirit searches for even today." They add: "One of the most attractive features of the films is its presentation of rural Bengal. The camera revels in the outdoors and freedom becomes a tangible reality."

== Home media ==
Atithi is available in both VCD and DVD formats, in multiple distributions.

== Awards and honours ==
- 13th National Film Awards - won Certificate of Merit for Second Best Feature Film
- BFJA Awards 1966:
  - Best Indian Films
  - Best Screenplay - Tapan Sinha
  - Best Actress in a Supporting Role - Geeta Mukherjee
- Nominated for the Golden Lion, Venice International Film Festival, 1966
