= Group Theatre =

Group Theatre may refer to:

- Group Theatre (London)
- Group Theatre (New York City)
- Group theatre of Kolkata
- Ulster Group Theatre, a former theatre, part of Ulster Hall, Belfast
