= Bankim Ghosh =

Indian actor

Bankim Ghosh (22 October 1922 — 3 June 1992) was a veteran actor of Bengali film and theatre personality.

== Early life ==
Ghosh was born in 1922 in Kolkata, British India. He passed Matriculate examination from Oriental Seminary and B.Com. from City College in 1938. He was a good athlete during his student life. Ghosh won the Bengal Boxing Championship for five years continuously. He joined and performed in various theatre groups like Gananatya, Ananda Bharati, Rupkar. His father was dead against of his acting passion. Ghosh left home and worked several jobs in Jadavpur University, Indian Airlines and calcutta High Court etc.

== Career ==
In 1948, Ghosh made his debut in the Bengali film with Bhuli Nai. Director Hemen Gupta offered him a small role in this film. Almost a decade later he played an important role in Sushil Ghosh's movie Dilli Theke Kolkata in 1961. In his long acting career, Ghosh worked with famous directors like Tapan Sinha, Bijoy Bose, Rituparno Ghosh. Mainly he was known for serious antagonistic as well as comic roles. He also worked with Satyajit Ray in Charulata and Chiriyakhana. Ghosh was a social activist worked for child rights. He was involved with a child welfare group named Jatiyo Sangho.

== Selected filmography ==
- Bhuli Nai
- Dilli Theke Kolkata
- Charulata
- Atithi (1965 film)
- Jiban Mrityu
- Chiriyakhana
- Kokhono Megh
- Chowringhee
- Kabita
- Arogya Niketan (film)
- Galpo Holeo Satti
- Bhanu Goenda Jahar Assistant
- Parineeta (1969 film)
- Alo Amar Alo
- Andha Atit
- Rater Rajanigandha
- Basanata Bilap
- Thagini
- Chhutir Phande
- Megh o Roudra
- Ranur Pratham Bhag
- Jadi Jantem
- Badnam
- Mayabini
- Hirer Angti
