= Megh o Roudra =

1969 Bengali film

Megh o Roudra (English: Clouds and Sunshine) is a Bengali drama film directed by Arundhati Devi and produced by Ajitesh Bandopadhyay based on a Rabindranath Tagore short story of the same name. The film was released in 1969 under the banner of K. L. Kapur Productions.

== Plot ==
This is the story of Shasibhusan, a young and spirited lawyer. After completion of study he lives in a village of British India. Very often a little neighbourhood girl Giribala comes to his home to learn. Giribala's father is a landlord. Her family marries her off at her childhood. Shashi never expresses his untold love to Giribala. He is an educated, courageous and law abiding person who always stands up for villagers against the oppression of British administrator. But for whom he struggles for justice betrays him before the court. At the time of trial Shashi becomes frustrated and is imprisoned by the judge. When he returns from jail, he meets Giribala. She has now become a prosperous widow.

== Cast ==
- Swarup Dutta as Shashibhusan
- Nripati Chattopadhyay
- Ajitesh Bandopadhyay as Shashi's father
- Hashu Bannerjee as Giribala
- Prahlad Brahmachari
- Prasad Mukherjee
- Bankim Ghosh
- Monojit Lahiri
- Bhabharup Bhattacharya
