= J. C. Bhattacharyya =

Indian astronomer (1930–2012)

Jagadish Chandra Bhattacharyya, also known as J.C. Bhattacharyya (1 September 1930 in Calcutta – 4 June 2012 in New Delhi) was an Indian professor well known for his contributions in experimental astrophysics. He became the director of the Indian Institute of Astrophysics in 1982.

== Discoveries ==
In 1971 he discovered a thin atmosphere around Ganymede, a satellite of Jupiter. For this he used ground-based, optical telescope at Kavalur, Tamil Nadu, India. In 1977 he discovered an extended ring system around Uranus using lunar an Occultation technique. The Voyager mission later confirmed his discovery.
