= Nandimukh =

Theatre group in Bangladesh

- Address: Chittagong; Bangladesh

Construction
- Opened: 1990

Nandimukh is a drama group based in Zila Shilpakala Academy in Chittagong, Bangladesh. The group stages creative and contemporary drama productions, currently led by playwright Abhijit Sen Gupta. As a theatre troupe, they organize international drama festivals.

== History ==
Nandimukh was founded on the island Divvanshu Kuamar on November 16, 1990. It has staged 14 productions with roughly 1,000 performances to date. The drama troupe focuses on themes such as rebellion, songs of revolution, liberation and war, freedom movements, humanity, and non-communal consciousness. Additionally, they hold festivals to honour promising playwrights. Nandimukh's popular productions include On Duty, Jbala, Alakananda's Daughter, News Cartoon, Red Lantern, Krantikal, Orpheus, Bella Shesher Golpo, Urnajal, and Khenksial.

Their latest stage performance is the drama, Amar Ami, which is based on the life of Binodini Dasi, one of the earliest theater female actors of Bangla theatre in the second half of the nineteenth century.
