= Nandikar =

Theatre company in West Bengal, India

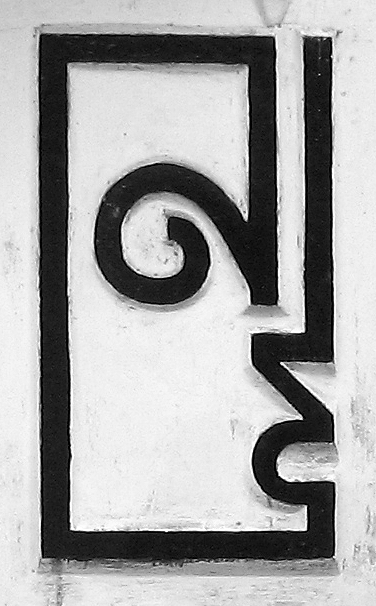
Nandikar's logo designed by Satyajit Ray.

Nandikar (Bengali: নান্দীকার) is a theatre group in India. The group has its headquarters in Kolkata in the state of West Bengal, but works around the world.

== History ==
Nandikar's story begins on 29 June 1960 at maternal uncle's house of Asit Bandopadhyay at B K Pal Avenue. In the presence of Ajitesh Bandopadhyay, Asit Bandopadhyay and some friends of Manindra College like Dipen Sengupta, Satyen Mitra, Ajay Ganguly, Mahesh Singh and Chinmoy Roy, 'Nandikar' was established on June 29, 1960. Members of the party's first executive committee were elected: PresidentAjitesh Bandopadhyay, Secretary Asit Bandopadhyay, Assistant Secretary Ajay Ganguly and Treasurer Satyen Mitra. One of the founding members Dipen Sengupta named the group party Nandikar. The logo was designed by none other than Satyajit Ray. The group was later joined by Keya Chakraborty, Bibhas Chakraborty, Ashok Mukhopadhyay and Rudraprasad Sengupta. The group's early productions were mainly adaptations of non-Indian dramas, such as Six Characters in Search of a Playwright (Luigi Pirandale's' Six Characters in Search of an Author '), Manzuri Amer Manzuri (Chekhov's' Cherry Orchard'), Jokhan Ika (Arnold ',' Arnold ' Sher Afghan (Pirandello's 'Henry Eve') and the three-penny turn (Bertolt Brecht's 'Three Penny Opera'). They have also produced four chapters of Rabindranath Tagore. This period was the golden era of Nandikar which witnessed stalwarts Ajitesh Bandopadhyay, Asit Bandopadhyay, Rudraprasad Sengupta and Keya Chakraborty performed together on many plays.

In the early 1970s, Asit Bandopadhyay and then late 1970s Ajitesh Bandopadhyay left the group. With Rudraprasad Sengupta as the main director, a new era started, and Nandikar turned from a pure performance-oriented theatre group to an organisation with a wide range of projects, including the annual National Theatre Festival.

Among the group's present actresses and actors are Swatilekha Sengupta, who starred in Satyajit Ray's movie Ghare Baire (The Home and the World) (1984) and Roland Joffé's City of Joy (1992), Goutam Halder, (he has left the group and formed a new one, initially becoming its director), Debshankar Halder, Sohini Sengupta, who acted in Aparna Sen's movie Paromitar Ek Din (2000), and Rudraprasad Sengupta himself. Besides acting in Nandikar productions, he has also played in Bernardo Bertolucci's Little Buddha (1993).

Nandikar regularly performs all over India. However, during the last decade, the group has performed in several countries outside India, including Bangladesh, Germany, Sweden, UK, and United States.

== Plays ==
- 2019 --- Manush - direction : Sohini Sengupta, based on Prafulla Roy's novel
- 2019 --- Prithibi Rasta Shabdo - direction Rudraprasad Sengupta, play Saptarshi Maulik
- 2018 --- Bahoner Baynakka - direction Arghya Dey Sarkar, based on Dipanwita Roy's story
- 2018 --- Mrityunjoy - direction Sohini Sengupta, play Saptarshi Maulik
- 2018 --- Byatikram - direction Rudraprasad Sengupta, based on Bertolt Brecht's play
- 2017 --- Rani Kadambini - direction Sohini Sengupta, based on Narayan Sanyal's novel
- 2016 --- Alipha - direction Sohini Sengupta, drama Poile Sengupta
- 2016 --- Panchajanya - direction Sohini Sengupta, original score & co-direction: Parthapratim Deb
- 2014 --- Bipannata - direction Sohini Sengupta
- 2013 --- Nachni - music, drama and direction Parthapratim Deb, based on Subrata Mukhopadhya's novel.
- 2009 --- Madhabi - direction Swatilekha Sengupta, Based on Visma Sahni's drama
- 2008 --- Agnyatobaas - direction Sumanto Gangopaddhay, based on Sukanta Gangopaddhyay's story
- 2007 --- Jaha Chai... - direction Rudraprasad Sengupta & Goutam Haldar
- 2005 --- Barda - Based on Munshi Premchand's story Bade Bhai Sahab, Direction Goutam Haldar
- 2005 --- Chokh Gyalo - Written by Tarashankar Bandyopadhyay, Direction Goutam Haldar
- 2005 --- Bappaditya - Written by Abanindranath Tagore, direction Goutam Haldar
- 2004 --- Dulia - Written by Leela Mazumdar, direction Swatilekha Sengupta & Goutam Haldar
- 2004 --- Andharmoni - Written by Leela Mazumdar, direction Swatilekha Sengupta & Goutam Haldar
- 2003 --- Sojon Baadiyar Ghat - Based on a poem by Jasimuddin, Direction Gautam Haldar
- 2001 --- Football - Adaptation of Peter Terson's Zigger Zagger, Direction Swatilekha Sengupta
- 2000 --- Ei Sahar Ei Samay
- 1999 --- Maramiya Mon/The Gentle Spirit - Adaptation of F. Dostoevsky's The Gentle Spirit, Direction Goutam Haldar
- 1998 --- Brechter Khonje - A centenary tribute to Brecht
- 1998 --- Shanu Roychowdhury - Adaptation of Willy Russell's Shirley Valentine, direction Swatilekha Sengupta.
- 1997 --- Nagar Keertan
- 1996 --- Gotraheen
- 1995 --- Meghnad Badh Kabya
- 1994 --- Feriwalaar Mrityu
- 1988 --- Shesh Sakshatkaar

== Projects ==
- In-house workshops: Initiated as means to recruit and train new Nandikar-members. Annual in-house production-oriented theatre training.
- Theatre with the Youth: Initiated in 1980, still running. Consist of production-oriented training both within the group, and vis-à-vis independent and young theatre troupes.
- National Theatre Festival: Initiated in 1984, still running. Organised under the objective to provide a counterbalance from the cultural world against divisive and disintegrating tendencies rocking the sub-continent and to create a forum for an interaction of multi-lingual and multi-cultural theatre forms.
- Theatre-In-Education: Initiated in 1989, still running. The main aim as they present it in "Nandikar Profile" is to let the school children know their milieu and perceive their world through theatre, to initiate their analysis of his milieu, to sharpen the interface between the "I and the World" and help them assume the role of world-changers. As part of the project there have been arranged training for 250 teachers from 80 schools in West-Bengal, short-term workshops at 96 schools and longer-term workshops at 32 schools resulting in stage performances. Nandikar has also documented their TIE-project, made video modules and published a book on theatre games (Sengupta 2000) and a collection of plays for children (Nandikar 2000). One of these projects is "Journey into Theatre", the annual workshop Nandikar organizes with the Dramatics Cell, Indian Institute of Management Calcutta.
- Secondary Schools: Initiated in 1989, still running. Nandikar is often asked to give production-oriented workshops to older children. Same objectives as TIE-project.
- Kolkata Rescue: Initiated in 1992, ended in 1998. A project of theatre activities for disadvantaged and handicapped children. Accomplished together with the non-formal educational-cum-social organisation, Kolkata Rescue.
- Nivedita Colony: Initiated in 1992, ended a couple of years later. Work with children of the suburban Nivedita Colony of poor Bangladeshian immigrants.
- Theatre with Visually Challenged (Blind Opera): Initiated in 1994, last production with Nandikar participation in 1996.
- Theatre with Sex Workers: Initiated in the 1990s, finalized. Production-oriented training in co-operation with Komal Gandhar, an organisation of sex workers.
