= Thankamani Kutty =

Indian dancer

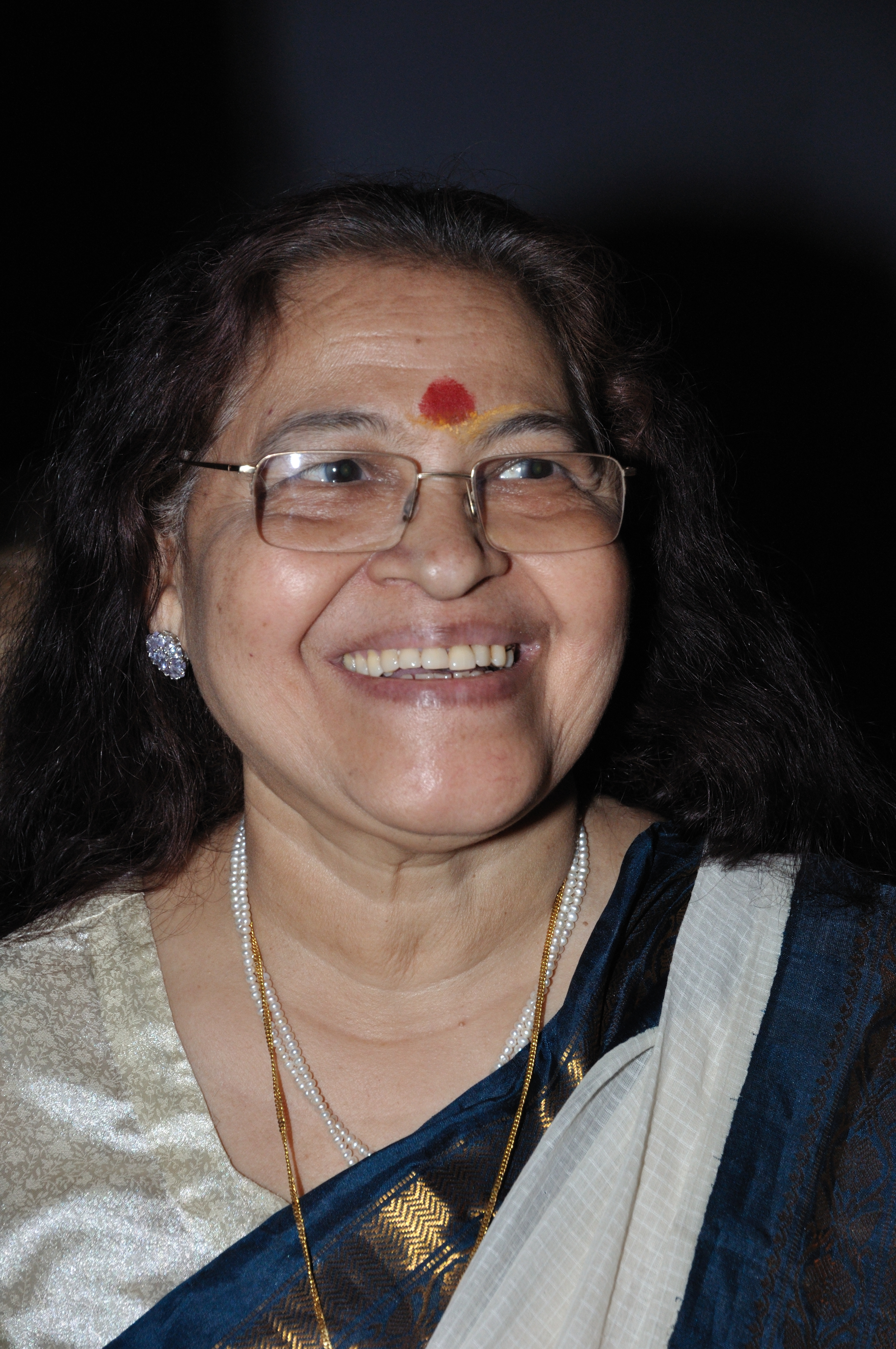
Kutty in 2011

Thankamani Kutty is an Indian dancer. She is a Bharatanatyam and Mohiniattam dancer and teacher. She, and her late husband Govindan Kutty, are widely known for their contributions in promoting South Indian dance, music and theatre in West Bengal.

== Awards ==
- Bharatmuni Samman
- Pravasi Award for Dance from Government of Kerala
- Nritya Natak Sangeet Drishya Kala Akademy Award from Government of West Bengal

== Books ==
- Thankamani, Kutty (2019). Bharatanatyam. Prism Books Private Limited. ISBN 978-93-88478-16-8.
