= Balai Chand Mukhopadhyay =

Bengali-language novelist, short story writer, playwright, poet, and physician

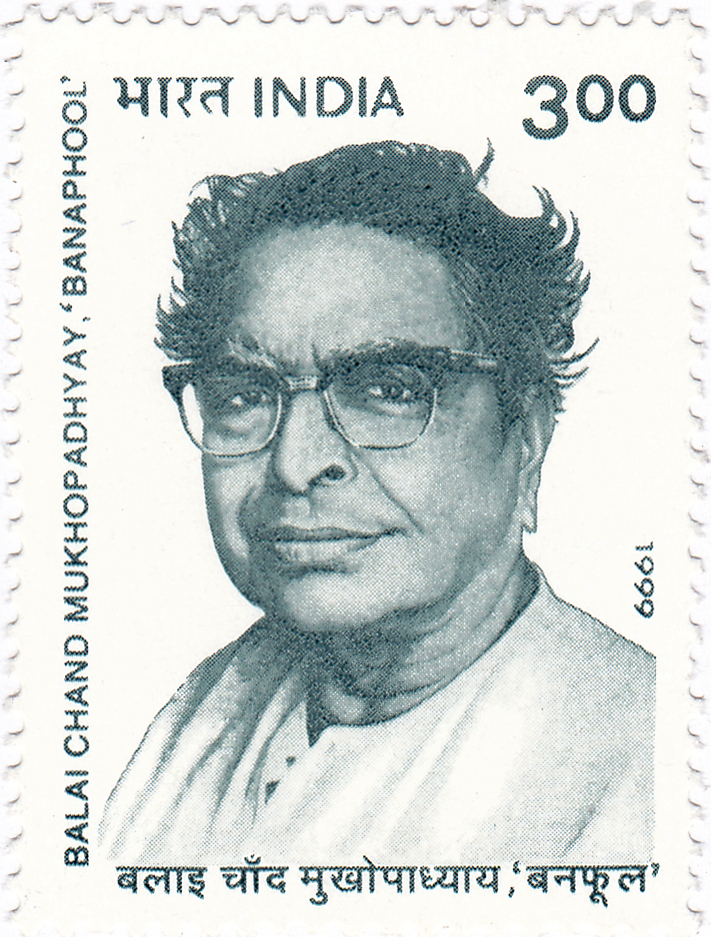
- Mukhopadhyay on a 1999 Indian stamp
- Born: 19 July 1899; Manihari, Purnia District, Bengal Presidency, British India
- Died: 9 February 1979 (aged 79); Calcutta, West Bengal, India
- Other name: Banaphul
- Education: Patna Medical College
- Occupations: Writer, poet, pathologist
- Notable work: Dana (Wings); Sthabar; Trinakhanda
- Relatives: Arabinda Mukhopadhyay (brother)
- Awards: Rabindra Puraskar; Sharat-Smriti Puraskar; Padma Bhushan

Balai Chand Mukhopadhyay (19 July 1899 – 9 February 1979) was an Indian Bengali-language writer, physician, and playwright, best known by his pen name Banaphul, (meaning "Wild / Forest flower" in Bengali). His oeuvre spanned novels, poetry, plays, essays and over 400 short stories, the genre for which he is best remembered. For his contribution to literature, he was awarded the Padma Bhushan in 1975, India's third-highest civilian honor.

== Life ==
Mukhopadhyay was born in Manihari village of Purnia district (now Katihar District), Bihar on 19 July 1899. His family originally hailed from Sehakhala situated in Hooghly District of present-day West Bengal. His father, Satyacharan Mukhopadhyay, was a doctor, and his mother was Mrinalini Devi. He originally took the pen name Banaphul ("the wild flower") to hide his literary activities from a disapproving teacher.

He attended Hazaribagh St. Columba's College. Later he admitted into the Patna Medical College and passed MBBS in 1927. After that, he joined Murshidabad Azimganj Hospital as medical officer.

He moved to Lake Town, Kolkata, in 1968, and died there on 9 February 1979. He is the elder brother of famous Bengali film Director Arabinda Mukhopadhyay.

== Literary works ==
He is best known for his short vignettes, which were often just half-page long, and centered on a single powerful moment with sharp observation and unconventional perspective, but his literary career spanned sixty-five years and included thousands of poems, over 586 short stories (a handful of which have been translated to English), 60 novels, 5 dramas, a number of one-act plays, an autobiography called Paschatpat (Background), and numerous essays." His short stories often revolve around a single, powerful moment, defined by sharp observation, unconventional perspectives, and exceptional storytelling.

=== Novels ===
- Trinokhondo তৃণখণ্ড
- Boitorini Tire বৈতরণীর তীরে
- Niranjana নিরঞ্জনা
- Bhuban Som ভুবন সোম
- Maharani মহারাণী
- Agnishwar অগ্নীশ্বর
- Manaspur মানসপুর
- Erao achhe এরাও আছে
- Nabin Dutta নবীন দত্ত
- Harishchandra হরিশ্চন্দ্র
- Kichukshan কিছুক্ষণ
- Se O Ami সে ও আমি
- Saptarshi সপ্তর্ষি
- Udai Asta উদয় অস্ত
- Gandharaj গন্ধরাজ
- Pitambarer Punarjanma পীতাম্বরের পুনর্জন্ম
- Nayn Tatpurush নঞ তৎপুরুষ
- Krishnapaksha কৃষ্ণপক্ষ
- Sandhipuja সন্ধিপূজা
- Hate Bajare হাটেবাজারে
- Kanyasu কন্যাসু
- Adhiklal অধিকলাল
- Gopaldeber Swapna গোপালদেবের স্বপ্ন
- Swapna Sambhab স্বপ্নসম্ভব
- Kashti Pathar কষ্টিপাথর
- Prachchhanna Mahima প্রচ্ছন্ন মহিমা
- Dui Pathik দুই পথিক
- Ratri রাত্রি
- Pitamaha পিতামহ
- Pakshimithun পক্ষীমিথুন
- Tirther Kak তীর্থের কাক
- Rourab রৌরব
- Jaltaranga জলতরঙ্গ
- Rupkatha ebang Tarpar রূপকথা এবং তারপর
- Pratham Garal প্রথম গরল
- Rangaturanga রঙ্গতুরঙ্গ
- Ashabari আশাবারি
- Li ৯
- Sat Samudra Tero Nadi সাত সমুদ্র তেরো নদী
- Akashbasi আকাশবাসী
- Tumi তুমি
- Asanglagna অসংলগ্ন
- Simarekha সীমারেখা
- Tribarna ত্রিবর্ণ
- Alankarpuri অলংকারপুরী
- Jangam জঙ্গম
- Agni অগ্নি
- Dwairath দ্বৈরথ
- Mrigoya মৃগয়া
- Nirmok নির্মোক
- Mandanda মানদন্ড
- Nabadiganta নবদিগন্ত
- Koshtipathar কষ্টিপাথর
- Sthabar স্থাবর
- Bhimpalashri ভীমপলশ্রী
- Pancha Parba পঞ্চপর্ব
- Lakshmir Agaman লক্ষ্মীর আগমণ
- Dana ডানা

=== Short stories ===
- Pratibaad
- swadhinata
- "Bonofuler Golpo"
- "Bonofuler Aro Golpo"
- "Bahullo"
- "Bindu Bishorgo"
- "Adrisholok"
- "Anugamini"
- "Tonni"
- "Nobomonjori"
- "Urmimala"
- "Soptomi"
- "Durbin"
- "Bonofuler Sreshto Golpo"
- "Bonofuler Golpo Songroho-1"
- "Bonofuler Golpo Songroho-2"
- "Banaphooler Chhoto Galpa Samagra—1 & 2"
- "Fuldanir Ekti Ful"

=== Film adaptation of his literature ===
- Agnishwar
- Bhuvan Shome
- Ekti Raat
- Aarohi (film) (He received National Film Award for Best Story)
- Alor Pipasa (1965)
- Hatey Bazarey
- Arjun Pandit (He received the Filmfare Award for Best Story for this film)
- Tilottama
- Paka Dekha
- Ektu Sore Bosun (2023)

== Postage stamp ==
On the 100th anniversary of his birth, the Government of India issued a postage stamp featuring his image.

== See also ==
- Bengali literature
- Binay Mukhopadhyay
