= Dhanyee Meye =

- Directed by: Arabinda Mukhopadhyay
- Screenplay by: Arabinda Mukhopadhyay; Himanish Goswami (Co-writer)
- Story by: Debanshu Mukherjee
- Starring: Uttam Kumar; Sabitri Chatterjee; Jaya Bhaduri
- Cinematography: Bijoy Ghosh
- Edited by: Amiyo Mukhopadhyay
- Music by: Nachiketa Ghosh
- Production company: Shree Productions
- Distributed by: Chandimata Films Pvt Ltd
- Release date: 1971
- Running time: 138 minutes
- Country: India
- Language: Bengali

Dhanyee Meye is a 1971 Bengali-language sports action comedy film directed by Arabinda Mukhopadhyay. The cast includes Uttam Kumar, Sabitri Chatterjee, Partho Mukherjee, Jaya Bhaduri, Jahor Roy and Nripati Chattopadhyay. This was Bhaduri's third film overall and only her second Bengali film. The music of the film was composed by Nachiketa Ghosh.

== Plot ==
Bogola is the younger brother of Kali Dutta and the captain of a football team Sarbamangala Club managed by his elder brother. The team goes to a village Harbhanga to play in the finals of football tournament named Nangteshwar Shield. Monosha's maternal uncle (mama) Gobordhan Chowdhury is the president of the local football club who, after losing the ancestral tournament (named after his father, Nangteshwar Chowdhury), decides to forcefully marry off Monosha and Bogola to keep the "Shield" in the family. All matters are soon resolved because Monosha and Bogola love each other.

== Cast ==
- Uttam Kumar as Kali Dutta (Bagla's brother)
- Sabitri Chatterjee as Bagla's sister-in-law
- Partho Mukherjee as Bagla
- Jaya Bhaduri as Mansa
- Jahor Roy as Gobardhan Choudhury
- Nripati Chattopadhyay as Gobardhan's masseur
- Tapen Chatterjee as Ghanta
- Sunil Das Gupta as Bairagi
- Sukhen Das as Nera (commentator)
- Salil Dutta
- Rabi Ghosh as Totla Bhattacharjee-village priest
- Tapati Ghosh as Tapan's wife
- Anubha Gupta as Gobardhan's wife
- Tarun Kumar Chatterjee as the doctor
- Shyam Laha as Nafar Ghosh
- Haridhan Mukherjee as Gobardhan's yes-man
- Chinmoy Roy as the lawyer
- Kalyan Chatterjee
- Shambhu Bhattacharya

== Soundtrack ==
Dhanni Meye

Soundtrack album by Nachiketa Ghosh
- Released: 1971
- Recorded: 1970
- Studio: Shree Productions
- Length: 0:16:47
- Label: Sa Re Ga Ma Pa

Nachiketa Ghosh chronology
Chhinnapatra (1971)	Dhanni Meye (1971)	Natun Diner Alo (1972)

All lyrics are written by Pulak Banerjee, Pronab Roy; all music is composed by Nachiketa Ghosh.

Songs
No.	Title	Playback	Length
1.	"E Betha Ki Je Betha Bojhe Ki"	Hemanta Mukherjee	3:12
2.	"Radhe Monta Rekhe Eli"	Hemanta Mukherjee	3:11
3.	"Bou Kotha Kou (Ja Ja Behaya Pakhi Ja Na)"	Aarti Mukherji	3:30
4.	"Sob Khelar Sera (Lathibaji Hockey Noy)"	Manna Dey	3:32
Total length:			13:25

== Reception ==
=== Reviews ===
The Times Of India wrote that, "It’s no doubt an all-time best Bengali comedy flick; ‘Dhanyee Meye’ also explored the beautiful relationship between a sister and his brother [sic]".
