= Galpo Holeo Satti =

1966 Indian film by Tapan Sinha

Golpo Holeo Sotyi
- Directed by: Tapan Sinha
- Written by: Tapan Sinha
- Story by: Tapan Sinha
- Produced by: Mira Sarkar
- Starring: Rabi Ghosh; Bhanu Bannerjee; Jogesh Chatterjee; Bharati Devi; Chhaya Devi; Ajoy Ganguli; Rudraprasad Sengupta
- Cinematography: Bimal Mukherjee
- Edited by: Subodh Roy
- Music by: Tapan Sinha
- Production company: New Theatres (Exhibitors) Pvt. Ltd.
- Distributed by: Chhayabani Pvt. Ltd.
- Release date: 13 October 1966
- Running time: 104 minutes
- Country: India
- Language: Bengali

Galpo Holeo Satti (Bengali pronunciation: [ɡɔlpɔ ɦoleo ʃotːi]; transl. A story, but true) is a 1966 Indian Bengali-language comedy-drama film written and directed by Tapan Sinha. Produced by Mira Sarkar under the banner of New Theatres (Exhibitors), the film stars an ensemble cast of Rabi Ghosh, Bhanu Banerjee, Jogesh Chatterjee, Chhaya Devi, Prasad Mukherjee, Bankim Ghosh, Ajoy Ganguly and Partho Mukherjee. It revolves around the mysterious arrival of an individual as a servant into a chaotic and fractured joint family, who restores love and empathy among the family members, over the course of time.

Later the film was remade twice into Hindi as Bawarchi (1972) and Hero No. 1 (1997), into Tamil as Samayalkaaran (1974), into Telugu as Goppinti Alludu (2000) and twice into Kannada as Sakala Kala Vallabha (1996) and No 73, Shanthi Nivasa (2007).

Throughout the years, the film has become immensely popular in Bengal and is often considered a cult classic in Bengali.

== Plot ==
A new servant arrives in a family which is suffering from internal tension. The new servant, whose identity is itself under suspicion, gradually becomes lovable to all of the family members including the old ailing family head. The story unravels how this new man in their life helps each of the family members to find out new meaning in their individual lives as well as find out the happiness of a close-knit family.

As the name is translated in English as "Although it's a story, it's true" the film introduces a character in the first half who is indescribably happy, fond of doing work and very much skillful at everything under the sun. He comes as a servant to the family of 10 members when they are in critical need of someone like him. They have lost the peace in their life, getting angry over others over silliest reasons. Then this man appears like an angel. With his mastery at doing household work, intellectual ideas, and even cultural abilities he makes everyone happy and all the good things start happening magically.

In the end, when the whole family is happy and reunited, he leaves all of a sudden without notifying anyone. He remains a mystery till the end.

== Cast ==
- Dhanonjoy: Rabi Ghosh
- Baba: Jogesh Chatterjee
- Barokhoka: Prasad Mukhopadhyay
- Barobou: Chhaya Devi
- Sejokhoka: Bankim Ghosh
- Sejobou: Bharati Devi
- Chotokhoka: Bhanu Bandyopadhyay
- Khoka: Ajoy Ganguli
- Boss: Rudraprasad Sengupta
- Thief: Chinmoy Ray
- Krishna: Krishna Basu
- Alok: Partho Mukherjee

== Soundtrack ==
Golpo Holeo Sotyi

Soundtrack album by Tapan Sinha

All lyrics are written by Tapan Sinha; all music is composed by Tapan Sinha.

Songs
No.	Title	Playback	Length
1.	"Ka Tobo Kanta"	Rabi Ghosh
2.	"Shuk bole otho shari"	Aarti Mukherjee

== Legacy ==
- Inaugural film at Kolkata International Film Festival, 2024
