= Natadha =

Theatre group in West Bengal, India

- Group logo
- Formation: 22 December 1974
- Type: Theatre group
- Website: http://www.natadha.org/

Natadha is a Bengali theatre group. located in Howrah, West Bengal. The theatre group started its journey in 1974. Shib Mukhopadhyay is the artistic director of this group.

== History ==
Natadha group was founded on 22 December 1974. The theatre group is located in Howrah, West Bengal. The first drama to be staged by this group was Aishwarik written and directed by Shib Mukhopadhyay. The group organises school theatre festival every year.

== Productions ==
(in alphabetical order)

- Aishwarik
- Bhitorer Mukh
- Caesar o Cleopatra
- Dakghar (of Rabindranath Tagore)
- Nakshatra Shikaar
- Bijane Bisher Neel
- Antardweep
- Kathasetu
- Julious Caesar Ebong
- Athoi
- Bohuboli
- Phool Phutuk
- Jalianwala
- Mahabharat
- Bishubishoy
- Ebang Socrates
- Eka Tughlaq
- Karna Ekhon
- Mahabharat 2
- Bishkaal
- Morossa
- Megh Name
- Palashi
- Raktakarabi
- Shakuntala
