= Paka Dekha =

1980 Bengali film

Paka Dekha is a 1980 Bengali comedy drama film directed by Arabinda Mukhopadhyay and produced by Mohan Mallick based on a story of Balai Chand Mukhopadhyay by the same name. This film was released under the banner of Reba Films, with Hemanta Mukhopadhyay scoring the music.

== Plot ==
Aparna's father, a police officer, arranges her marriage on his own. Aparna does not agree with her father's choice and flees from home. Her father arrests Aparna's friends and interrogates them one by one.

== Cast ==
- Utpal Dutt as Aparna's father
- Mahua Roychoudhury as Aparna
- Rabi Ghosh
- Tarun Kumar Chatterjee
- Santosh Dutta
- Sobha Sen
- Kamu Mukherjee
- Haridhan Mukherjee
- Koushik Bandyopadhyay
- Shambhu Bhattacharya
- N. Viswanathan
- Banani Chowdhury
- Reba Debi
- Sailen Mukhopadhyay
- Kalyani Adhikari

== Soundtrack ==
- "Jadi Chao Jante Amra" - Arundhati Holme Chowdhury, Sagar, Sudhin Dasgupta
- "Gaur Baran Santasi Ek" - Amal Mukhopadhya
- "Tumi Kemonti Hobe" - Hemanta Mukhopadhyay
- "Bhanur Pashe Chandra Jemon" - Tarun Banerjee
