= Happy Husbands =

Happy Husbands may refer to:

- Happy Husbands (2010 film), an Indian Malayalam-language comedy film directed by Saji Surendran
- Happy Husbands (2011 film), an Indian Hindi-language comedy film directed by Anay Sharma
