= Agnishwar =

1975 Bengali language socio-political drama film directed by Arabinda Mukhopadhyay

- Theatrical release poster
- Directed by: Arabinda Mukhopadhyay
- Written by: Banaphool
- Screenplay by: Arabinda Mukherjee
- Based on: Agnishwar by Banaphool
- Produced by: Uday Samanta; Ranjit Samanta
- Starring: Uttam Kumar; Madhabi Chakraborty; Sumitra Mukherjee; Kajal Gupta; Partha Mukherjee; Tarun Kumar; Dilip Roy; Jahar Roy; Asit Baran; Haridhan Mukhopadhyay
- Cinematography: Bijoy Ghosh
- Edited by: Amiyo Mukherjee
- Music by: Hemanta Mukhopadhyay
- Production company: Pratibha Pictures
- Distributed by: Chandimata Films Pvt Ltd
- Release date: 19 July 1975
- Running time: 123 minutes
- Country: India
- Language: Bengali

Agnishwar (English: The fire god) is a 1975 Indian Bengali language socio-political drama film co-written and directed by Arabinda Mukhopadhyay. The story of the film is based on the novel of the same name written by Balai Chand Mukhopadhyay, which itself was inspired from the life of his teacher Banabihari Mukhopadhyay. It stars Uttam Kumar in the titular role, alongside Madhabi Chakraborty, Sumitra Mukherjee, Kajal Gupta, Partha Mukherjee in lead roles, while Tarun Kumar, Dilip Roy, Asit Baran, Jahar Roy, Haridhan Mukhopadhyay play other pivotal roles. It deals with the life and career of a patriotic, idealistic doctor.

== Plot ==
The plot revolves around a patriotic doctor who lends a moral backbone to the broken society of India.

== Cast ==
- Uttam Kumar as Dr. Agnishwar Mukherjee
- Madhabi Mukherjee as Agnishwar's wife
- Sumitra Mukherjee as Suchhanda
- Kajal Gupta as 'Store' Babu's wife
- Asit Baran as Dr. Latif
- Partha Mukherjee as Agnishwar's son
- Tarun Kumar as Sarbeshwar, the manager of DTS
- Dilip Roy as Khagen
- Haridhan Mukhopadhyay as 'Store' Babu
- Jahar Roy as Ghosh
- Sulata Chowdhury as Padma
- Shambhu Bhattacharya as Jhagru
- Durgadas Banerjee
- Kshudiram Bhattacharya

== Soundtrack ==
Agnishwar

Soundtrack album by Hemanta Mukherjee
- Released: 1975
- Recorded: 1974
- Studio: Pratibha Pictures Pvt Ltd
- Genre: Feature Film Soundtrack
- Length: 0:12:58
- Label: Channel B Entertainment
- Producer: Uday Samanta

Hemanta Mukherjee chronology
Phuleshwari (1974)	Agnishwar (1975)	Mohunbaganer Meye (1975)

Rabindranath Tagore and Dwijendralal Ray composing and lyrics was use for the film. Music director of the film was Hemanta Mukherjee.

Songs
No.	Title	Playback	Length
1.	"Dhanodhanye Pushpe Bhora"	Hemanta Mukherjee	6:02
2.	"Purano Sei Diner Kotha"	Hemanta Mukherjee	3:37
3.	"Tobu Mone Rekho"	Sumitra Mukherjee	3:19
Total length:			12:58

== Reception ==
The film become superhit at the box office and ran for 100 days in theaters. The film earned cult status and still creating the buzz to this generation. It's takes inspiration for many doctors and other people today. The performance of Uttam Kumar, story and direction being praised by the audiences.
