= Rudraprasad Sengupta =

Indian actor

Rudraprasad Sengupta রুদ্রপ্রসাদ সেনগুপ্ত
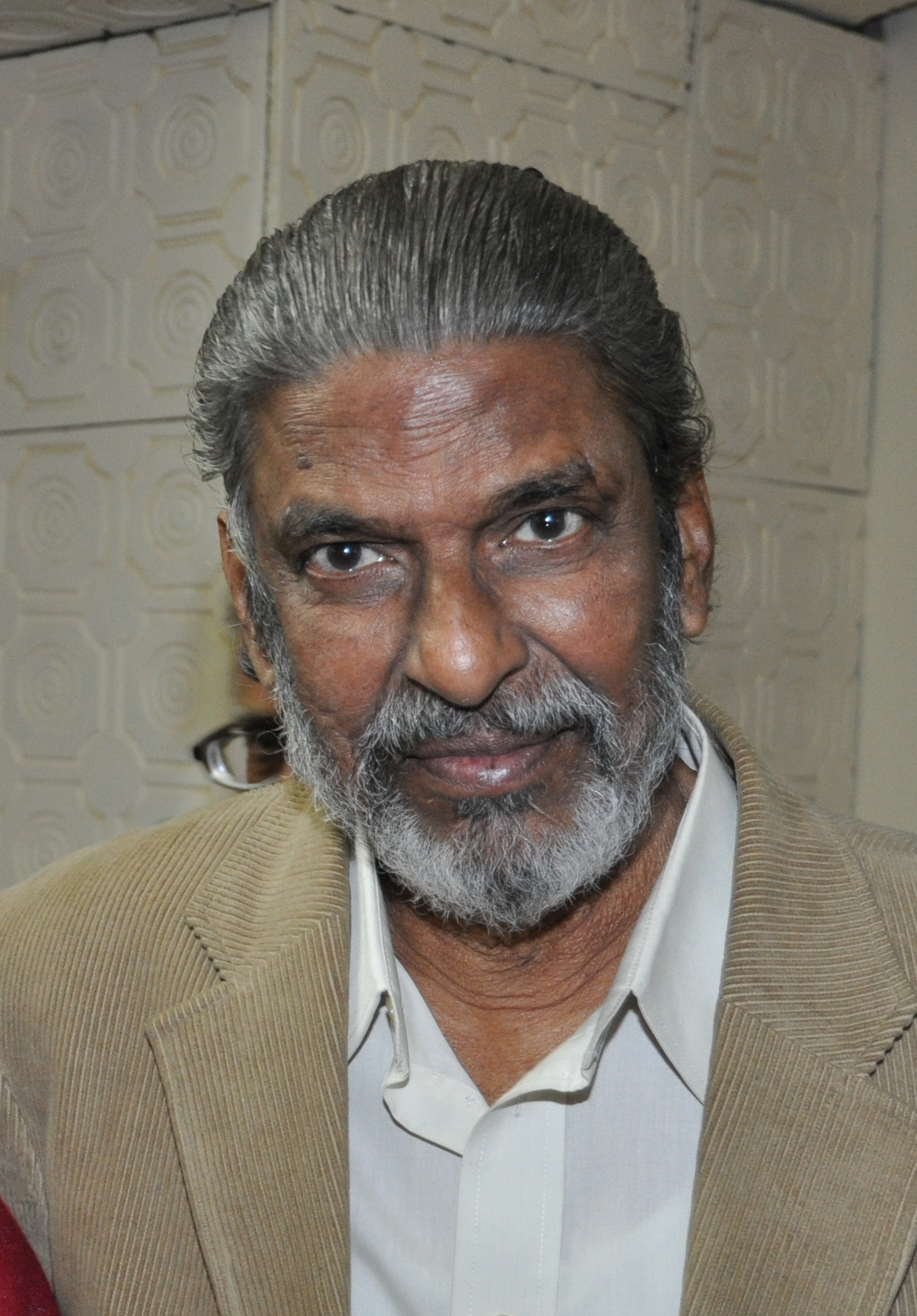
- Sengupta in January 2010
- Born: 31 January 1935 (age 91); Calcutta, Bengal Presidency, British India
- Occupation: Theatre personality
- Spouse: Swatilekha Sengupta
- Children: Sohini Sengupta

Rudraprasad Sengupta (born 31 January 1935) is a Bengali Indian actor, director and cultural critic.

== Biography ==
Sengupta was born in Calcutta (now Kolkata), Bengal, the son of Anant Sengupta and Usha Prabha Sengupta. He studied at the Scottish Church College of the University of Calcutta where he earned his B.A. and M.A degrees in English literature. He started his professional career as a lecturer of Sreegopal Banerjee College at Mogra, Hooghly and was formerly a reader in English at the Brahmananda Keshab Chandra College, Calcutta, and a visiting lecturer in the Drama Department of Rabindra Bharati University.

In 1961 he joined the Kolkata-based theatre group Nandikar and in the early 1970s started to direct several plays for the group. In the late 1970s he became the leader of the group. He had directed many plays including Football, Feriwalar Mrityu among others.

He received several awards, including the highest national award from Sangeet Natak Akademi in 1980. He has also appeared in some Bengali art films, Bernardo Bertolucci's Little Buddha, and Roland Joffé's City of Joy.

He was married to Swatilekha Sengupta, who was one of the leading actresses of Nandikar. His daughter Sohini Sengupta is one of the leading actresses in theatre and films. Many of his students and protegé have gone on to become famous in their own right in Bengali theater, such as Parthapratim Deb and Debshankar Haldar.

== Filmography ==
- Purba Paschim Dakshin (2019)
- Autograph (2010)
- Little Buddha (1993)
- City of Joy (1992)
- Charmurti (1978)
- Padi Pishir Barmi Baksha (1972)
- Ekhoni (1971)
- Hatey Bazarey (1967)
- Galpo Holeo Satti (1966)
- Sagina Mahato

== Awards ==
- Banga Bibhushan in 2012 by the Government of West Bengal for his contributions to theatre.
- Anukul Samman in 2013 by the National Drama Festival, Allahabad.
- Sangeet Natak Akademi Tagore Ratna in 2012
