= List of works by Ritwik Ghatak =

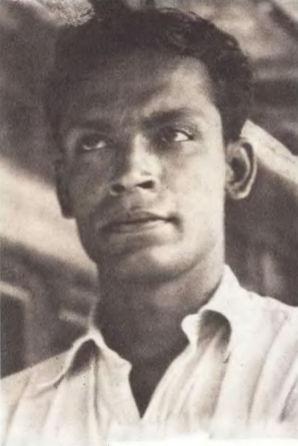
Ritwik Ghatak, at a young age

Ritwik Ghatak was an Indian filmmaker and also a playwright, poet, and writer of short stories. Ghatak started his creative career as a poet and a fiction writer, and then began writing for the theater and became involved with Gananatya Sangha and the Indian People's Theatre Association. Later he moved to film direction. He also wrote more than 50 essays on film. Satyajit Ray wrote that these essays "cover(ed) every possible aspect of the cinema".

== Filmography ==
=== Films ===
==== Director and scriptwriter ====
No	Year	Film	English title	Actors	Release date
1	1958	Ajantrik	The Unmechanical / The Pathetic Fallacy	Kali Banerjee, Gangapada Basu, Satindra Bhattacharya, Kajal Gupta, Gyanesh Mukherjee Anil Chatterjee, Tulsi Chakrabarti	23 May 1958
2	1959	Bari Theke Paliye	The Runaway	Kali Banerjee, Master Parambhattarak Lahiri, Gyanesh Mukherjee, Keshto Mukherjee. Jahor Roy, Satindra Bhattacharya,	24 July 1959
3	1960	Meghe Dhaka Tara (Partition Trilogy)	The Cloud-Capped Star	Anil Chatterjee, Supriya Choudhuri, Bijon Bhattacharya, Gita Ghatak, Gyanesh Mukherjee, Dwiju Bhawal, Niranjan Roy, Gita Dey	14 April 1960
4	1961	Komal Gandhar (Partition Trilogy)	E-Flat	Supriya Choudhuri, Abanish Banerjee Gita Dey, Anil Chatterjee, Bijon Bhattacharya, Chitra Sen, Mantu Ghosh, Satindra Bhattacharya	31 March 1961
5	1965	Subarnarekha (Partition Trilogy)	Golden Line	Abhi Bhattacharya, Madhabi Mukherjee, Bijon Bhattacharya, Jahor Roy, Satindra Bhattacharya, Gita Dey, Ritwik Ghatak	1 October 1965
6	1973	Titash Ekti Nadir Naam	A River Called Titash	Rosi Samad, Kobori Sarwar, Rawshan Zamil, Fakirul Hasan Bairagi, Prabir Mitra, Ritwik Ghatak	27 July 1973
7	1977	Nagarik	The Citizen	Kali Banerjee, Prabha Devi, Satindra Bhattacharya, Shobha Sen, Gangapada Basu, Anil Chatterjee, Ketaki Dutta, Kesto Mukherjee, Gita Shome	Produced in 1952. Released on 20 September 1977
8	1977	Jukti Takko Aar Gappo	Reason, Debate and a Story	Ritwik Ghatak, Tripti Mitra, Saoli Mitra, Bijon Bhattacharya, Gnanesh Mukherjee, Sugato Burman, Ananya Ray, Master Ritoban Ghatak, Jahar Roy, Utpal Dutt	30 September 1977

==== Story & scriptwriter ====
Year	Film	Director	Remarks
1957	Musafir	Hrishikesh Mukherjee	Script
1958	Madhumati	Bimal Roy	Story & Script
1960	Swaralipi	Asit Sen	Script
1962	Kumari Mon	Chitrarath	Script
1963	Deeper Nam Tiya Rong	Gurudas Bagchi	Script
1965	Rajkanya	Sunil Banerjee	Story & Script
1968	Heerer Prajapati (Hindi)	Santi P. Choudhury	Script

==== Actor ====
Year	Film	Director
1950	Tathapi	Manoj Bhattacharya
1951	Chinnamul	Nimai Ghosh
1962	Kumari Mon	Chitrarath
1962	Subarnarekha	Ritwik Ghatak
1973	Titash Ekti Nadir Naam	Ritwik Ghatak
1974	Jukti Takko Aar Gappo	Ritwik Ghatak

==== Short films and documentaries ====
- The Life of the Adivasis (1955)
- Places of Historic Interest in Bihar (1955)
- Oraon (1957)
- Scissors (1962)
- Ustad Alauddin Khan (1963)
- Fear (1965)
- Rendezvous (1965) - FTII student film directed by RN Shukla under the supervision of Ritwik Ghatak
- Civil Defence (1965)
- Scientists of Tomorrow (1967)
- Yeh Kyon (Why/The Question) (1970)
- Amar Lenin (My Lenin) (1970)
- Puruliar Chhau (The Chhau Dance of Purulia) (1970)
- Durbar Gati Padma (The Turbulent Padma) (1971)

==== Incomplete films and documentaries ====
- Bedeni (1951)
- Kato Ajanare (1959)
- Bagalar Banga Darshan (1964–65)
- Ronger Golam (1968)
- Indira Gandhi (1972)
- Ramkinkar (1975)

==== Films on Ritwik Ghatak ====
- Ekti Nadir Naam (The Name of a River) (2002) by Anup Singh.
- Meghe Dhaka Tara (2013) directed by Kamaleshwar Mukherjee.

==== Screenplays aborted before shooting ====
- Raja (1956)
- Amritokumbher Sandhane (1957)
- Akal Basonto (1957)
- Arjan Sardar (1958)
- Balidan (1962)
- Aranyak (1963)
- Nakshi Kanthar Math (1963)
- Elephant taming in Gouripur (1963)
- Shyam Se Neha Lagei (1964)
- Janmabhumi (Pandit Mashai) (1965)
- Chaturanga (1966)
- Hirer Prajapati (1966)
- Sansar Simante (1968)
- Echoes from Vietnam in Bengal (1968)
- Kumar Sambhaber Ashtom Swargo (1969)
- Sat Lahari
- Natun Phasal
- Ajay and Gabroo
- Those forgotte ones
- Shei Bishnupriya (1974)
- Mannequin (1974)
- Hath
- Princess Kalaboti
- Buddhu Bhutum (1975)
- Lojja (1975)

== Theatre ==
- Chandragupto (Dwijendralal Ray), actor
- Achalayoton (Tagore) (1943), director and actor
- Kalo Sayor (Ghatak) (1947–48), actor and director
- Kalonko (Bhattacharya) (1951), actor
- Dolil (Ghatak) (1952), actor and director
- Kato Dhane Kato Chaal (Ghatak)(1952)
- Officer (Gogol) (1953), actor,
- Ispaat (Ghatak) (1954–55), un-staged
- Khorir Gondi (Brecht)
- Galileo Chorit (Brecht)
- Jagoran (Atindra Mozumdar), actor
- Jalonto (Ghatak)
- Jwala (Ghatak)
- Dakghar (Tagore)
- Dheu (Biru Mukhopadhay)
- Dhenki Swarge geleo Dhan bhane (Ghatak/Panu Paul)
- Natir Puja (Tagore)
- Nabanna (Bhattacharya)
- Nildarpan (Dinabandhu Mitra), actor
- Nicher Mahal (Gorky), un-staged
- Netajike nie (Ghatak)
- Poritran (Tagore)
- Falguni (Tagore)
- Bidyasagar (Banaphool)
- Bisarjan (Tagore)
- Vangabandor (Panu Paul), actor
- Voter vet (Panu Paul), actor
- Musanfiro ke lie (Gorky), actor
- Macbeth (Shakespeare), actor
- Raja (Tagore)
- Sanko (Ghatak), actor
- Sei Meye (Ghatak), director
- Strir Patro (Tagore)
- Hojoborala (Sukumar Ray)
- Pashanda Pandit

== Bibliography ==
=== Books ===
- Ritwik Ghatak stories ISBN 81-87075-55-4
- Galileo Charit (Bengali translation of Brecht's Life of Galileo)
- Chalachitra, Manush Ebong Aro Kichu Dey's publishers ISBN 81-295-0397-2
- Cinema and I, Ritwik Memorial Trust, Kolkata
- On the cultural "Front", Ritwik Memorial Trust
- Rows and Rows of Fences: Ritwik Ghatak on Cinema, Seagull Books Pvt. Ltd, Kolkata ISBN 978-81-7046-178-4
- Ritwik Ghatak Stories, Translated from Bengali by Rani Ray, New Delhi, Shrishti publishers and distributors ISBN 978-81-87075-55-4

=== Short stories ===
- Akashgangar srot dhore
- Ezahar
- Shikha
- Ecstasy
- Rupkotha
- Raja
- Parashpathar
- Bhuswarga Achanchal
- Sphotik Patro
- Chokh
- Comrade
- Sarak
- Prem
- Jhankar
- Mar

=== Articles and essays on film ===
Article	First published	Year
A New Chapter in Acting	Chalachitra, Autumn issue, Page 93–101	1950
A Draft on Cultural Line	Indian People's Theatre Association	1 June 1951
A Film Festival in Calcutta" Soviet Film Grand Concert: Bicycle Thief	Parichay, March, Year 21, Vol–2, No–3 Page 70–79	1952
Soviet Film In Bengali	Parichay November, Year 24, No–5, Page 517–526	1954
About Oraons (Chotonagpur)	Ritwik, October 1977, Page 189–201	1954–1955
Some Thoughts on Ajantrik	Indian Film Reviews, Page 22–23	December, 1958
One Long Boundary Wall	Chalachitra, Annual number, Page 117–119	1959
Various Weapon: Editing	Ritwik Page 183–187	Unknown
Speech About Cinema; Artists of Bengal	Chitrabikshan Jan–Apr, 1976	1958–60
A Book review: Theory of Film	Indian Film Culture, Vol–1, No–1, Page 47–50	April–June, 1962
Music in Indian Cinema And The Epic Approach	Artist, January–March, Vol–1, No–1, Page 37–38	1963
An Interview On Film Script	Chalachitra Autumn issue, Vol III, Page 47–50	1963
Human Society, Our Tradition, Film Making and my Efforts	Chalachitra Autumn issue	1963
Art and Integrity	Dainik Basumati Autumn issue	1963
Editorial	Artist July–September, Vol–1 No–3	1963
Nazarin and Louis Buñuel	Chalachitra Winter Page 41–44	1963
The Film and I	Montage Vol–II No–3	1963
Nazarin– a review	Kino Vol–I No–1, Page 23–26	January, 1964
Experimental Cinema	Amrita, Autumn issue	1964
The Mother Land and Artist's Duty	Parichay Autumn issue	1964
Assessing a Film	Chalachitra Autumn issue, page 18–20	1964
Experimental Cinema	Lecture, Film and Training Institute	16 September 1964
On Komal Gandhar	Chitrapat, Vol–I, No–I, Page 23–24	1965
The Director's Message in Bengali Cinema	Chirakalpa Summer issue, Vol–I, No–I	1965
Understanding Cinema	Angik, Summer issue	1965
A Book review: Theory of Film– An Attitude to Life and an Attitude to Art		1965
It is not possible to accept what Box Office demands	Statement column, Jugantar	13 August 1965
The Past and Present of Bengali Films, Interview	Chalachitra Page 24–25	October 1965
A Book Review: Theory of Film; Nature of Film	Lecture F.T.I.I of Pune	30 September 1965
Bengali Cinema, Literary Influence	Film Fare	1965
Sound in Film	Parichay, Chatushkala issue, Year 35	1965
Plays and the Present Age	Jatiya Sahitya Parishad, Page 9–12	12 April 1966
On Subarna Rekha	Chitrapat Vol–2 No–2, Page 26–27	August 1966
My Film	Film, Autumn issue	1966
Art, Cinema and the Future	Ananda Bazar Patrika	1966
The Third International Film Festival in India	Chitralekha Vol– I, No– 4, Page– 13–16	Winter 1966
Experiment in Cinema and I	Unpublished	Unknown
The Future of Film	Movie Montage Vol–1 No–1 Page–1	1967
My Coming into Films	Film Forum Festival, Souvenir, 17–20 July	1967
Sound in Film	Film Forum Festival, Souvenir, 17–20 July	1967
From a Statement	Chitrayan Page–34 (August, 1977)	1967
What is the True Form of Cinema	Lecture	29 September 1967
Experimental Film and I	Chitrabikshan	October, 1967
Cinema and the Subjective Factor	Chitrakalpa Vol–2 No–1, Page 5–7	October, 1967
Thinking about Cinema	Movie Montage Special issue, Vol–I, No–2, Page 49–53	1967
Interview	Movie Montage Vol–I, No–2, Page 54–58	1967
Documentary Film	Sahitya–Patra Sept–Nov issue, Page 117–121	1967
The Position of Cinema in the Society	Movie Montage Vol–I, No–3, Page 3–4	1967
Bengali Society and Bengali Cinema	Madhyanya Oct–Dec issue, Vol–II, No–3, Page 147–150	1967
Filmic Rhythm and Structure	Chalachitra Sept–Dec issue, Page 9–10	1967
Prognosis for Today's Cinema	Desh December issue, Vol– 35, No–9, Page 885–886	1967
The So-called Crisis in Bengali Cinema	Abhinay-Darpan May–June issue, Page 32–34	1968
Some Stray Thought Some Perceptions	Ritwik October 1977, Page 5–10	1968
The Film I Want to Make About Vietnam	West Bengal Youth Festival, Commemorative Volume	1968
Dance in Cinema	Nupur Dance Academy, Souvenir	1968
On The People's Theatre Movement	Abhinay Darpan, May–June issue, Page 2, 7–8	1969
If I Could Make Films Again	Antarjatik Angik	1969
Obscenity and Films	Assam Bani Patrika	12 December 1969
The Present and Future of Indian Film Making	Abhinay March–April issue, Vol–I No–2 & 3, Page 138–148, 201–204	1970
Interview by Ajay Basu	Abhinay May issue, Vol–I, No–4	1970
What Ails Indian Film Making	Amrita Bazar Patrika, Sunday issue	10 May 1970
Interview	Chitrabhash	July 1970
Our beloved Ganga–da, The Quite Man	Gangapada Basu Commemorative volume, page 44–38	3 Jan 1972
If There Be Any One Person In India Who Comprehends The Film Medium, Then He is Satyajit Ray	Cine Technique	March, 1972
Interview	Chatrapat No–9, Page 37–38	1972
Thoughts about Ajantrik	Ajantrik Angik Winter–spring issue, Page 55–60	Unknown
Interview– Titash and others by Tulu Das	Unknown	1973
Ritwik Ghatak, an interview	Chitrabikshan August–September, 6th year, No 11–12	1973
Brecht and Ourselves	Natyachinta Volume–2, Page 9	1973
An Interview by Muhammed Khashru	Dhrupadi Vol–IV, Page 148–169	13 May 1974
People I Have Seen Both The Bengal	Unknown	September, 1974
Dialectics in Films	Amrita	1974
My Views	Amrita	1974
Two Aspects, The Mind, Day Dreams, The Eye, Movement In Film	Chalachitra Autumn issue, Page 14–23	1974
Face to Face with Ritwik Ghatak	Chitrabikshan	September, 1974
Bijon Bhattacharya– Giver of New Life	Natyadarpan Vol–1, No–1, Page 13–15	May 1975
An Interview by Prabir Sen	Jalim Singh's Journal	1975
Recent plays	Moumachi	1975
The Emergency– Ritwik Ghatak's Works at the Censor's Mercy	Chitrabikshan July–Sept, 10th Year, No. 10–12, Page 9–10	1975
Let There Be Sound	Chitrabikshan Jan–Apr issue, Page 216	1976
Film Making	Chitrabikshan Jan–Apr issue, Page 225–226	1976
Symbol	Shabda	Unknown
On Drama	Agyatabas No–17, Page 49–50	1976
Cinema, Literature and My Films	Chitrabikshan	November, 1976
La Dolce Vita and Felini	Chitrapat, Special issue	1976
On Bergman	Chitrapat, Special issue	1976
My Thoughts on Cinema	F.F.S.I Ritwik Retrospective Souvenir	1976
What It Means To Make Films In India	Unknown	Unknown
An Interview	by Kalpana Biswas	1976
An Interview	Film Miscellany	1976
An Interview	Swarabarna	1976
Excerpt of an Article	Movie Montage No–18 Page– 57	November 1976
On Memory of Pramathesh Barua	Unknown	Unknown
