= Nagarik =

Film by Ritwik Ghatak

Nagarik "The Citizen"
- Directed by: Ritwik Ghatak
- Written by: Ritwik Ghatak
- Produced by: Film Guild: Pramode Sengupta; Bhupati Nandi; Ritwik Ghatak
- Starring: Satindra Bhattacharya; Prova Debi; Kali Banerjee; Sova Sen; Ketaki Dutta; Geeta Shome; Ajit Banerjee; Keshto Mukherjee
- Cinematography: Ramananda Sengupta
- Music by: Anil Chandra Sengupta
- Release date: 20 September 1977
- Running time: 125 minutes
- Country: India
- Language: Bengali

Nagarik (Bengali: নাগরিক), also spelled as Nagorik (transl. The Citizen), was the first feature-length film directed by legendary Indian director Ritwik Ghatak. Completed in 1952, it preceded Satyajit Ray's Pather Panchali as perhaps the first example of an art film in Bengali cinema, but is deprived of that honor, since it was released twenty-four years later, after Ghatak's death. On 20 September 1977, it finally premiered at the New Empire theatre in Kolkata, India. Ghatak directed only eight feature films, but is generally regarded as one of the auteurs of Indian cinema and virtually unsurpassed as a creator of powerful imagery and epic style by directors such as Satyajit Ray and of transcendental power and extraordinariness by critics such as Derek Malcolm.

== Synopsis ==
Ramu, a fresh graduate is searching for a job like many others in post-Partition Kolkata. His mother is yearnful of older times when the family used to live in a better house, but she bears her suffering quietly, for the most part. His father is myopic and full of cynicism for he does not share the idealistic aspirations of his two children that better times will come. The light of Ramu's life is his lover Uma, who lives in an equally precarious situation with her sister Shephali and her mother. Jatin is an even poorer minor character living near Uma's dwelling who Ramu avoids because he cannot help the former out financially. To make ends meet, Ramu's mother takes in Sagar, a poor chemist, as a paying guest. Ramu does not get a job and cannot pay rent even with the meagre money that he gets from Sagar and is insulted by the landlord. Ultimately the family is evicted.

Just before the family has to leave to go stay in slums, Ramu visits Uma and tells him they are moving. Uma offers to help them set up in the new dwelling, an obvious sign of humanism on Ghatak's part. Shephali, her sister, cannot bear to live in poverty any longer, so she leaves home with a shady man. Seeta confesses that she loves Sagar, a love that Sagar reciprocates. However, Sagar, is now rendered homeless and destitute and mentions that he does not have the audacity to expect them to even be united. Ramu overhears parts of Sagar and Uma's conversation and is touched by the moment. He appeals to Sagar for him to come and live with the family. The film ends with the characters walking out in the rain, a symbolic sign of hope and renewal.

== Credits ==
=== Cast ===
- Satindra Bhattacharya as Ramu
- Prova Debi as his mother
- Kali Banerjee as his father
- Sova Sen as his sister, Seeta
- Ketaki Dutta as Uma
- Geeta Shome as Shephali
- Ajit Banerjee as Sagar
- Keshto Mukherjee as Jatin
- Master Pintoo
- Anil Ghosh
- Umanath Bhattacharya

=== Crew ===
- Direction and Screenplay, Ritwik Ghatak
- Cinematography, Ramananda Sengupta
- Editing, Ramesh Joshi
- Sound, Satyen Chatterjee
- Narration, Ritwik Ghatak
- Music, Anil Chandra Sengupta
- Lyrics, Govinda Moonish
- Art Direction, Bhupen Majumdar
- Production, Film Guild

== Soundtracks ==
All music of the film composed by music director Anil Chandra Sengupta * Majh ye to majhdhar...

- Majhu pran kathin kathor...

== Critical analysis ==
Nagarik is considered a prototype for Ghatak's subsequent films since all of the main ingredients are present. The tone is deliberately didactic and the treatment melodramatic, elements which Ghatak in no way considered inferior to realism. The pain of the Partition is poignant among the protagonists, all refugees from East Bengal, now suffering from the loss of homeland and livelihood. This is a theme that Ghatak helped portray when working on Chinnamul, and one that would permeate most of his later creations. The film is not a study in pessimism but ends on a positive note with a speech by Ramu hoping for a new future. This has been considered overtly Marxist considering Ghatak's involvement with group theatre and the IPTA. The film is thought to be well scripted, acted, and filmed with scenes that show unique visual and aural registers. However, it is also criticized as being slow and long-drawn. Although the film shows the influence of French director Jean Renoir, it lies very much in a developing tradition of Indian film. Its film noir feel and stylised manner has something in common with contemporary works in Hindi cinema by Guru Dutt and Kamal Amrohi. It particularly shows the influence of the latter's Mahal (1949) in its use of narration, use of music, stylised direction of the acting and in several verbal echoes. It was also clearly known to Ghatak's Bengali contemporary Satyajit Ray and strongly influences his The World of Apu (1959), the third in the Apu Trilogy. Nagarik is, therefore, a pivotal work in the history of Indian cinema.

== Screening of Nagarik aka The Citizen in different festivals ==
2017: Ritwik Ghatak Retrospective UK, at Dundee Contemporary Arts, Dundee, Scotland, UK, Programme curated by Sanghita Sen, Department of Film Studies, St Andrews University, UK

== See also ==
- List of works of Ritwik Ghatak
