= Kato Ajanare =

Kato Ajanare may refer to:

- Kato Ajanare (novel), a Bengali novel written by Mani Shankar Mukherjee
- Kato Ajanare (film) (1959), an unfinished film of Ritwik Ghatak
