= Gyanesh Mukherjee =

Indian actor

Gyanesh Mukhopadhyay
- জ্ঞানেশ মুখোপাধ্যায়
- Born: 5 July 1926; Shyambazar, Calcutta, British Raj
- Died: 8 May 2008 (aged 81); Kolkata, West Bengal , India
- Occupations: Theater Actor, director

Gyanesh Mukherjee (5 July 1926 – 8 May 2008) was a Bengali actor, director and theater personality.

== Career ==
He was involved with Indian People's Theatre Association (IPTA). In his film career, Mukherjee worked with number of famous directors like Ritwik Ghatak, Mrinal Sen and Tapan Sinha. Since the late 1950s to the 1970s, he played a prolific role in cinema as well as theatre. In 1973 he directed the film Achena Atithi which was remade in Hindi as Anjane Mehmaan in 1975. He founded Mass theaters group in Kolkata. Mukherjee died in Kolkata on 8 May 2008.

== Filmography ==
Year	Title
	Ganga
	Achena Atithi
	Ekti Jibon
	Chandaneer
	Hirer Angti
	Meghe Dhaka Tara
	Jukti Takko Aar Gappo
	Pratisodh
	Ekhane Pinjar
	Bari Theke Paliye
	Mrigayaa
	Ajantrik
	Alo
	Khana Baraha
	Priyo Bandhabi
	Mansur Miyar Ghora
	Banashree
	Swikarokti
	Gajamukta
	Tero Nadir Parey
	Rakta Rekha
	Chhotto Jignasa
	Kal Tumi Aleya
	Akash Kusum
	Chhaya Surya
	Baishey Shravana
	Desh
	Janani
	Target
	Damu
	Mukhyamantri
