= Shibram Chakraborty =

Indian writer and humorist

- Born: 13 December 1903; Chanchal, Malda, Bengal Presidency, British India
- Died: 28 August 1980 (aged 76); Calcutta, West Bengal, India
- Occupation: Writer
- Writing career
- Language: Bengali
- Genre: Humour
- Notable works: Bari Theke Paliye; Harshabardhan - Gobardhan

Shibram Chakraborty (1903–1980) was an Indian writer and humorist. His best known short stories and novels are renowned for their unique use of pun, alliteration, play of words and ironic humour. He was a prolific author who also wrote poems, plays, non-fiction and novels for mature audiences in his long career.

== Personal life ==
Chakraborty was born into the well-known Chanchal Rajbari (royal house of Chanchal) family, although his ancestral home was in Malda. However the ancestral seat of the Chakrabarty family was at Choa in Murshidabad District. He was born at his maternal uncle's house at Nayan Chand Dutta Street, Darjipara in Kolkata, the capital of British India. His father was Shibprashad Chakrabarty. A spiritualist by nature, Shibprashad would often speak of the road. Shibram inherited his wanderlust from his father.

In school, he played an active role in the Swadeshi movement (struggle for Indian independence) and as a result was jailed, which resulted in his inability to sit for the matriculation exam. Despite not progressing further with his education, Chakraborty studied on his own and was knowledgeable in a variety of subjects.

He spent most of his life in the second-floor rented accommodation, only consisting of a bedstead & bedsheet at Muktaram Babu Street in Kolkata. He turned its walls into a hand-written calendar, documenting his time there. He never married and was known as a "free spirit" and was generous to his friends. He did not maintain proper records or preserve the manuscripts of some of his works.

== Work ==
His initial foray into literature was as a poet. His first book of poems was called Manush (Man). He worked as a feature writer in daily newspapers and magazines such as Basumati (বসুমতী), Ananda Bazar Patrika (আনন্দবাজার পত্রিকা) and Desh [দেশ]. These were tinged with humour and got him noticed in the public eye. Subsequently, he started writing stories and novels.

His writing is noted for use of literary puns as a key story vehicle – speculated to be a first in Bengali literature. He is also noted for his self-deprecating humour. An example of this is the convoluted way in which he would spell his name in Bangla in his stories: শিব্রাম চকরবরতি (Shee-bram Cho-ko-ro-bo-ro-ty). He would often put himself into his stories amongst fictional characters. The most famous and recurring characters in his stories are the brothers Harshabardhan [হর্ষবর্ধন] and Gobardhan [গোবর্ধন] and his sister Bini. He also created a detective character named Kalke Kashi. Advertisements for his books often bill him as the King of Laughter. Aside from funny stories, his other notable writings include the dramatisation of Sarat Chandra Chattopadhyay's novel Dena Paona (দেনা পাওনা) under the title Shoroshi [ষোড়শী] (Sixteen Year Old Girl), the political work Moscow bonam Pondicheri [মস্কো বনাম পন্ডিচেরি] (Moscow Versus Pondicheri;) and the play Jokhon Tara Kotha Bolbe [যখন তারা কথা বলবে] (When They Will Speak). His (so called) autobiography Eeshwar Prithibee Valobasa (ঈশ্বর পৃথিবী ভালবাসা) (God Earth Love) is also regarded as one of his best works. During his 60-year career he authored more than 150 books.

Shibram spent his early days in Paharpur and Chanchal. In his boyhood days, he once ran away from home. This experience would later inspire his novel Bari Theke Paliye [বাড়ি থেকে পালিয়ে] (Runaway), which was made into a film by Ritwik Ghatak.

== Last phase of life and death ==
In the last phase of his life, he ran into serious financial difficulties and the Government of West Bengal put him on a monthly allowance. He died in Kolkata in 1980. Very few people attended his cremation, including a few of his very close friends like Shakti Chattopadhyay and Sunil Ganguly.

== Bibliography ==
- Bari Theke Paliye [বাড়ি থেকে পালিয়ে] (Runaway): A novel
- Bari Theke Paliyer Por [বাড়ি থেকে পালিয়ের পর] (After Runaway): A novel, sequel to Bari Theke Paliye.
- The Merry Adventures of Harshabardhan and Gobardhan. (Translated by Arunava Sinha. Hachette India, New Delhi, 2014)
- Eeshwar Prithibee Valobasa [ঈশ্বর পৃথিবী ভালবাসা] (God Earth Love), 1974: (So called) autobiography.
- Valobasa Prithibee Eeshwar [ভালবাসা পৃথিবী ঈশ্বর] (Love Earth God), 1976: Another (so called) autobiography.
- Aaj O Agamikaal [আজ ও আগামীকাল] (Today & Tomorrow), 1929: A collection of short stories.
- Ekti Swarnaghotita Apokeerti [একটি স্বর্ণঘটিত অপকীর্তি] (A Misdoing Due to Gold): Drama
- Debotar Jonmo [দেবতার জন্ম] (Birth of God): Short story
- Jakhan Tara Katha Bolbe [যখন তারা কথা বলবে], (When They Will Speak): A play.

== Quotations ==
- "Though that may be not the ultimate goal, but the communists do have an extreme goal, and that is All for one and one for all."
- "The history of human civilisation is sub-divided into two kinds of people. One who is selfishly screaming that all of this earth belongs to me. State – that's me! I will benefit—this happens to be the biggest thing of this world. The other is sacrificing himself by exiling into the forest or on the cross; they said, I have come for all; I have sacrificed myself to all. Both of them show the incompleteness of the civilisation."
- "My respect for Rabindranath is not because he is a so-called superman, but because he is a complete human being."
- "The basis of a human being's completeness lies in the maturity of body, mind and intellect ... the bottom line of completeness is congruence, harmony."
- "To earn the freedom of a nation, a freedom fighter has to sacrifice his own freedom."
- "After years of hard contemplation I have reached the conclusion that all this excitement about "New Year" is meaningless, because in my experience, it has never lasted more than a year." (Paraphrased and translated from Bengali)
