= Amar Lenin =

1970 film by Ritwik Ghatak

- A scene from the documentary
- Directed by: Ritwik Ghatak
- Screenplay by: Ritwik Ghatak
- Produced by: Sumana Films
- Starring: Arun Kumar
- Cinematography: Dhruba Kumar Basu; Shakti Banerjee
- Music by: Jyotirindra Moitro; Binoy Roy
- Color process: Black and white
- Release date: 1970
- Country: India
- Language: Bengali

Amar Lenin (Bengali: আমার লেনিন, subtitle: My Lenin) is a 1970 black and white documentary film directed by film director Ritwik Ghatak made for Government of West Bengal in the centenary year (1970) of the birth of Vladimir Lenin.

The film was created by Ritwik Ghatak. It is based on the thoughts and views of Ritwik Ghatak on Lenin and communism. The film was, for some time, not allowed to be released in India.

== Initial problems ==
After making the film, countries such as the Soviet Union and the People's Republic of Poland approached Ritwik Ghatak for him to show the movie in those countries. However, issues arose with the National Film Censorship Board of India which did not approve of the movie and banned it in India. Ghatak and his team had to work hard to have the movie passed by the censorship board. Ritwik Ghatak personally met with Indira Gandhi on this matter.

== Cast and Crew ==
- Production: Sumana Films
- Direction and screenplay: Ritwik Ghatak
- Cinematography: Dhruba Kumar Basu and Shakti Banerjee.
- Music Direction: Jyotirindra Maitro and Binoy Roy
- Singers: Preeti Banerjee, Binoy Roy, Mantu Ghosh, Anima Dasgupta, Reba Ray Choudhury.
- Acting: Arun Kumar etc.

== See also ==
- Ramkinkar Baij (film)
