= Nemai Ghosh (director) =

- Born: 1914; Calcutta, West Bengal, British India [now India]
- Died: 1988 (aged 73–74)
- Occupations: Cinematographer, director
- Years active: 1940s–1981

Nemai Ghosh, or Nimai Ghosh (1914–1988), was an Indian film director and cinematographer, best known for his film Chinnamul (1950).

== Career ==
Ghosh started his career as a stage actor with Little Theatre Group formed by Utpal Dutt . In addition to photography, he directed the highly acclaimed and neo-realistic Chinnamul (1950), that dealt with the partition of Bengal during the partition of India in 1947. Film director Ritwik Ghatak started his film career as an assistant in this film.

Despite critical acclaim, Chinnamul failed commercially. Thereafter Ghosh relocated to Madras (now Chennai), and he worked in Tamil cinema as a cinematographer in a few films and directed a film titled Paathai Theriyudhu Paar that won Certificate of Merit for Second Best Feature Film in Tamil. His last film as a director was the Tamil film Sooravali (1981).

Ghosh was also active in the Film Society movement in Madras and started the Madras Film Society which was the first society involved in that part of the country. This society came after Bombay and Calcutta Film Societies started in 1942 and 1947 respectively.

He was also a pioneer in the labour movement of employees of various hues working in the film industry in Madras which was the production centre for Tamil, Telugu, Malayalam and Kannada films during those days.

== Filmography ==
As director

- Chinnamul (1950)
- Paadhai Theriyudhu Paar (1960)
- Sooravali (1981)

As cinematographer

- Chinnamul (1950)
- Anubavi Raja Anubavi (1967)
