= Kato Ajanare (novel) =

Novel by Mani Shankar Mukherjee

- Author: Mani Shankar Mukherjee
- Language: Bengali
- Genre: Novel
- Publication place: India

Kato Ajanare ("All the unknown") is a Bengali novel written by Mani Shankar Mukherjee. This was Shankar's first novel which mainly deals with author's memories of Mr. Barwell, a renowned Barrister of the Calcutta High Court.

== Adaptation ==
- In 1959 Ritwik Ghatak started creating a Bengali film Kato Ajanare based on this novel, but the film remained unfinished.
