= Keshto Mukherjee =

Indian actor and comedian

- Born: 7 August 1925; Calcutta, Bengal Presidency, British India
- Died: 3 March 1982 (aged 56); Bombay, Maharashtra, India

Keshto Mukherjee (7 August 1925 – 3 March 1982) was an Indian actor and comedian. He was born in Kolkata, Bengal Presidency, British India. He specialised in comic drunkard roles in Hindi films.

He used to share a very good relation with the iconic director Ritwik Ghatak and had very tiny but important roles in the maestro's films such as the trickster in Bari Theke Paliye, the madman in Ajantrik or character roles in Nagarik and Jukti Takko Aar Gappo.

== Family and personal life ==
Keshto Mukherjee was married to Chaaya Mukherjee, and they had two sons, Indrajit Mukherjee (Babloo Mukherjee) and Ranjit Mukherjee. Ranjit Mukherjee died in a traffic accident.

=== Relationship with alcohol ===
Keshto Mukherjee specialised in comic drunkard roles in Hindi films. Though he was famous for his drunkard typecast role in Hindi films, he was a teetotaler throughout his life. However in his own interview published in the Stardust magazine in 1981, he mentioned the following; "I drink a lot. I started boozing when I left my home town and came to Bombay to become a film hero. I lived in a dingy room in the railway quarters with nothing to eat, but lots to drink. I drank because I was frustrated. I didn’t have any work. I drank to get some sleep, to forget that there were rats running all around the place, that there was a dog sleeping next to me. I drank to relieve the tension. And I only had daaru as my true friend. And again, it was because of this daaru that I gained popularity. Today, if anyone says my name, everyone pictures a bevda. I cannot ditch my friend now. I still drink. The only day when I didn’t touch a drop of liquor was on my wedding day."

== Death ==
Keshto Mukherjee died on March 3, 1982, in an accident in Mumbai (then Bombay).

== Selected filmography ==
- Nagarik (1952) - Jatin Babu
- Musafir (1957) - Street Dancer
- Ajantrik (1958) - Lunatic
- Bari Theke Paliye (1958) - Magician
- Lukochuri (1958)
- Khazanchi (1958)
- Parakh (1960) - Compounder Keshto
- Masoom (1960) - CID Officer
- Aas Ka Panchhi (1961)
- China Town (1962) - Keshto
- Prem Patra (1962)
- Asli Naqli (1962)
- Aashiq (1962) - Bheekhu
- Aarti (1962) - Johnny
- Daal Me Kala (1964) - Mangu
- Faraar (1965) - School Janitor
- Akashdeep (1965) - Ramu (uncredited)
- Teesri Kasam (1966) - Shivratan
- Pinjre Ke Panchhi (1966) - Keshto (Barber)
- Paari (1966)
- Biwi aur Makan (1966)
- Mehrban (1967) - Gadhamaharaj's devotee
- Majhli Didi (1967) - Bhola - Navin's employee
- Baazi (1968) - Madhav
- Padosan (1968) - Calcuttiya
- Shikar (1968)
- Sadhu Aur Shaitaan (1968)
- Apna Ghar Apni Kahani (1968)
- Anokhi Raat (1968) - Buyer (stammerer)
- Chanda Aur Bijli (1969) - Raju
- Suhana Safar (1970) - Keshto
- Maa Aur Mamta (1970) - Drunkard
- Geet (1970) - Keshav
- Mere Humsafar (1970) - Abdul Narayan D'Souza
- Umang (1970) - Prem Praksh Jagmag (uncredited)
- Maa Ka Aanchal (1970) - Drunkard Flower Vendor
- Bachpan (1970) - Advocate John - Tom's dad
- Guddi (1971) - Kader Bhai
- Rakhwala (1971) - Drunk patient (uncredited)
- Mere Apne (1971) - Jattu
- Memsaab (1971) - Masterji
- Lakhon Mein Ek (1971) - Chatterjee
- Ek Nari Ek Brahmachari (1971) - Doctor
- Door Ka Raahi (1971) - Paunchkaudi
- Chori Chori (1972) - Hotel Manager
- Piya Ka Ghar (1972) - Baburao Kulkarni
- Sanjog (1972) - Mohan's Father
- Bombay To Goa (1972) - Sleeping Passenger
- Lalkaar (1972) - Keshto
- Parichay (1972) - Teacher
- Koshish (1972) - The Man irritated by Hari's whistling (uncredited)
- Sabse Bada Sukh (1972) - Guide at railway station
- Yeh Gulistan Hamara (1972) - Soldier
- Bindiya Aur Bandook (1972)
- Anokha Milan (1972)
- Mem Saheb (1972)
- Loafer (1973) - Drunk
- Zanjeer (1973) - Gangu
- Bada Kabootar (1973) - Abdul
- Sweekar (1973) - Drunkman
- Samjhauta (1973) - Cheater at R.K.Studio
- Chalaak (1973) - Gangaram Sakharam Patil
- Achanak (1973) - Man in the train
- Nirmaan (1974) - Bajrangi
- Apradhi (1974) - Nawab Ashiq Mizaaj
- Aarop (1974) - Kunwarelal
- Geetaa Mera Naam (1974) - Keshto - Raja's Assistant
- Aap Ki Kasam (1974) - Kanhaiya Lal (uncredited)
- Jab Andhera Hota Hai (1974) - Drunkard
- Chor Chor (1974) - Keshto Mukherjee
- Trimurti (1974) - Drunk Man
- 5 Rifles (1974) - Drunkard
- Pran Jaye Par Vachan Na Jaye (1974) - Prospective groom for Janniya
- Jeevan Rekha (1974)
- Imaan (1974) - Mama
- Humrahi (1974)
- Call Girl (1974)
- Maze Le Lo (1975)
- Kaam Shastra (1975)
- Chupke Chupke (1975) - James D'Costa (Driver)
- Aakraman (1975) - Rangeela
- Qaid (1975) - Kanhaiyalal
- Pratigya (1975) - Chandi
- Kala Sona (1975) - Drunkard
- Sholay (1975) - Hariram
- Salaakhen (1975) - Qaidi No.840
- Mazaaq (1975) - Waiter
- Kahte Hain Mujhko Raja (1975)
- Do Thug (1975) - Jaggu
- Dhoti Lota Aur Chaupaty (1975)
- Aag Aur Toofan (1975)
- Sankoch (1976) - Dhakkan
- Sabse Bada Rupaiya (1976) - Himalaya Club's President
- Charas (1976) - Police Inspector Gomes
- Zindagi (1976) - Principal 'Kalu'
- Sikka (1976)
- Rakhi Aur Rifle (1976)
- Meera Shyam (1976)
- Gumrah (1976) - Kesto - Drunk
- Arjun Pandit (1976) - Examiner
- Aaj Ka Mahatma (1976) - Pedro
- Vir Mangdavalo (1976) (Gujarati film)
- Amaanat (1977) - Drunk
- Chala Murari Hero Banane (1977) - Abdul
- Tinku (1977) - Truck Driver
- Sahib Bahadur (1977) - Trumpet Player
- Ram Bharose (1977)
- Niaz Aur Namaz (1977)
- Naami Chor (1977)
- Kitaab (1977) - Pandit Shankar Lal
- Kinara (1977)
- Inkaar (1977) - Drunk fishing at the china creek
- Dildaar (1977) - Raju
- Daku Aur Mahatma (1977) - Shersingh
- Chacha Bhatija (1977) - Kesto
- Agar... If (1977) - Chaman
- Aafat (1977) - Pyare Miyan
- Rahu Ketu (1978) - Taxi driver
- Aakhri Daku (1978)
- Naukri (1978) - Hawaldar
- Damaad (1978) - Tulsiram
- Azad (1978) - Ramesh Sharma
- Giddha (1978) - Policeman
- Devta (1978)
- Khatta Meetha (1978) - Milkman in the song "Roll Roll"
- Dillagi (1978) - Tonga driver
- Do Ladke Dono Kadke (1979) - Shantu's husband / Local drunk
- Sargam (1979) - Tushar Babu Ghosh / Chatterjee
- Prem Bandhan (1979) - Johny - Dr Vinod's Assistant
- Jhoota Kahin Ka (1979) - Rahim (Chauffeur)
- Gol Maal (1979) - Drunk
- Jurmana (1979) - Babu Ram
- Duniya Meri Jeb Mein (1979) - Watchman
- Hum Tere Ashiq Hain (1979) - Mukherjee
- Do Shikari (1979) - Gulu
- Salaam Memsaab (1979) - James
- Ghar Ki Laaj (1979) - Manphool
- Meena Kumari Ki Amar Kahani (1979)
- Desh Drohi (1980) - Drunkman in Hotel Room
- Khubsurat (1980) - Dayal's cook
- Aap Ke Deewane (1980) - Lawyer
- The Burning Train (1980) - Passenger in toilet
- Hum Nahin Sudhrenge (1980) - Mukherjee
- Red Rose (1980) - Man came to buy brassiere for his girlfriend
- Be-Reham (1980) - Ram Prasad
- Taxi Chor (1980) - Robert
- Qatil Kaun (1980) - Press Manager
- Garam Khoon (1980)
- Ganga Aur Suraj (1980)
- Paanch Qaidi (1981) - Sharaabi
- Kudrat (1981) - Jagat Ram
- Mangalsutra (1981) - Drunk in Tonga
- Wardat (1981) - Dharamdas
- Naseeb (1981) - Ad Film Director
- Rocky (1981) - Drunk Driver
- Chhupa Chhuppi (1981)
- Shradhanjali (1981) - Rocky - Drummer
- Sansani: The Sensation (1981) - Juman Miya
- Nai Imarat (1981) - Drinkard
- Meena Kumari Ki Amar Kahani (1981)
- Main Aur Mera Haathi (1981)
- Katilon Ke Kaatil (1981) - Husband of lady with necklace
- Jeene ki Arzoo (1981)
- Hathkadi (1982) - Drunkman
- Dial 100 (1982) - P. K. Bahke
- Meharbaani (1982)
- Troyee (1982) - Drunkard
- Ghazab (1982) - Emperor
- Dil-E-Nadan (1982)
- Waqt-Waqt Ki Baat (1982)
- Shiv Charan (1982) - Sweeper
- Rachna (1983) - Babu
- Paanchwin Manzil (1983)
- Divorce (1984) - Shankar dada
- Kasam Durga Ki (1984)
- Hanste Khelte (1984) - Canteen Owner
- Hum Dono (1985) - Shankar
- Maa Ki Saugandh (1986)
- Aatank (1996) - Phillips Crasto (uncredited) (final film role)

== Awards and nominations ==
Year	Award	Category	Film	Result
1976	Filmfare Awards	Best Performance in a Comic Role	Kaala Sona	Nominated
1978	Filmfare Awards	Best Performance in a Comic Role	Chacha Bhatija	Nominated
1979	Filmfare Awards	Best Performance in a Comic Role	Azaad	Nominated
1981	Filmfare Awards	Best Performance in a Comic Role	Be-Reham	Nominated
1981	Filmfare Awards	Best Performance in a Comic Role	Khubsoorat	Won
