= Chor Chor =

- Directed by: Prem Prakash
- Written by: Vijay Anand; Suraj Sanim
- Produced by: Vijay Anand
- Starring: Vijay Anand; Leena Chandavarkar; Trilok Kapoor; Iftikhar
- Cinematography: Chaman Kadalbuju
- Edited by: Vijay Anand; Babu Shiekh
- Release date: 1974
- Running time: 124 minutes
- Country: India
- Language: Hindi

Chor Chor is a 1974 Bollywood drama film directed by Prem Prakash. The film stars Vijay Anand.

Chor Chorian Bank manager Akash searches for his father's killer in the small town of Panchgani.

Chor Chor's Family

- Vijay Anand
- Leena Chandavarkar
- Trilok Kapoor
- Iftekhar
- P. Jairaj
- Keshto Mukherjee
