= Ramaprasad Banik =

Bengali actor, director and playwright (1954–2010)

- রমাপ্রসাদ বণিক
- Born: 28 December 1954; Calcutta, West Bengal, India
- Died: 27 December 2010 (aged 55); Kolkata, West Bengal, India
- Occupation: Actor
- Spouse: Sumitra Banik
- Children: 2

Ramaprasad Banik (রমাপ্রসাদ বণিক) (1954–2010) was a Bengali theatre actor, director and playwright. He also worked in films and televisions. He started his career at a very early age with Putul khela, which was an adaptation of Henrik Ibsen's A Doll's House. This play was directed by Sombhu Mitra. Banik was called protégé of the Sombhu Mitra. Banik wrote and acted in many plays for Bohurupee. In 1981 he left Bohurupee he created his own theatre group Chena Mukh. In 1991 he created another theatre group "Theatre Passion" He was a very prominent part of the Nehru Children's Museum theatre classes.

== Career ==
=== Plays ===
With Bohurupee

- Putul Khela
- Dashachakra
- Chhera Tar
- Dashachakra
- Chhar Addhaye
- Jadi Arekbar

With Chena Mukh

- Ranee Kahini
- Icchegari
- Aguntuk
- Pakhi
- Sharanagato

With Theatre Passion

- Kabikatha
- Trata
- The Tempest
- Dahanshil
- Antar Bahir
- Sparshak
- Bhablai Bhalo
- Anukul
- Anko Sir, Golapi Babu ar Tipu
- Iti Mritajan

With Nehru Children's Museum

- Mahabidya Primary
- Ekla Pagol
- Manoniyo Shotyo
- Jodio Sandhya
- Anubhab
- Sarashwati Samipeshu
- Luxembourg er Laxmi
- Bhalobasha
- Parichoy

With Purba Paschim

- Angshumati
- Patolbabu Film Star

With Anya Theatre

- Ache Ache Sthan

With Taki Natyam

- Good Morning Nishikanta

With IFTA

- Ghasiram Kotwal

With Ajantrik

- Pratham Path

=== Films ===
- Chalo Patol Tuli (2011)
- Aalo Chhaya (2011)
- Bajikar (2011)
- Ek Poloke Ektu Dekha (2011)
- Purna Brahma Sri Sri Harichand (2011)
- Juaari (2009)
- Hochheta Ki? (2008)
- Khalnayak (2006)
- Sadhu Babar Lathi (2008)
- Abar Asbo Phire (2004)
- Rakhe Hari Mare Ke (2003) as Constable Ghoshal Babu
- Amar Mayer Shapath (2003) as Nata Bose
- Arjun Aamar Naam (2003)
- Patalghar (2003)
- Tumi Je Aamar (1994) as Avik Halder
- Jharh (1979)

=== Television soap operas ===
- Janmabhumi
- Draupadi
- Kanakanjali
- 13 no. Barir Rahasya (as Hukakasi)
- Mahaprabhu
- Mohini
- Bhanga Garar Khela
- Aleya
- Banhishikha
- Ek Posla Bristi
- Raja and Goja
