= Rakhe Hari Mare Ke =

2003 Indian Bengali film

- Theatrical release poster
- Directed by: Ratan Adhikari
- Screenplay by: N. K. Salil
- Dialogues by: N. K. Salil
- Story by: Pritam Jalan
- Based on: Avasara Police 100 by K. Bhagyaraj
- Produced by: Pritam Jalan
- Starring: Prosenjit Chatterjee; Rachana Banerjee; Raima Sen; Laboni Sarkar; Sabyasachi Chakraborty; Subhasish Mukhopadhyay
- Cinematography: Yusuf Khan
- Edited by: Atish Dey Sarkar
- Music by: Babul Bose
- Production company: Kushagra Arts
- Distributed by: Shree Venkatesh Films; Surinder Films
- Release date: 31 January 2003
- Running time: 158 minutes
- Country: India
- Language: Bengali

Rakhe Hari Mare Ke is a 2003 Indian Bengali-language action comedy film directed by Ratan Adhikari. Produced and conceptualized by Pritam Jalan under the banner of Kushagra Arts, the screenplay and dialogues were written by N. K. Salil. It stars Prosenjit Chatterjee in dual roles, alongside Rachana Banerjee and Raima Sen in lead roles, while Laboni Sarkar, Sabyasachi Chakraborty, Rajesh Sharma, Antara Biswas, Subhasish Mukherjee, Ramaprasad Banik and Kaushik Banerjee play supporting roles. The soundtrack of the film was composed by Babul Bose, with lyrics penned by Gautam Sushmit.

== Cast ==
- Prosenjit Chatterjee in a dual role as
  - Haridas Pal
  - Arjun Chowdhury
- Rachana Banerjee as Hari's wife
- Raima Sen as Riya
- Laboni Sarkar
- Sabyasachi Chakraborty
- Subhasish Mukhopadhyay
- Rajesh Sharma
- Kaushik Banerjee as Raghav
- Ramaprasad Banik
- Bhola Tamang
- Antara Biswas as Riya's friend
- Trae Dottin as Deadlock professional

== Soundtrack ==
1. Chokhe Chokhe Kotha Holo
2. Cholechi Mora Desher Tore
3. Katus Kutus
4. Na Na Na Sono Na
5. Piriter Oi Laal Pipra
6. Tomake Jibon Bhore Bedhechi
