= Leena Chandavarkar =

Indian actress (born 1950)

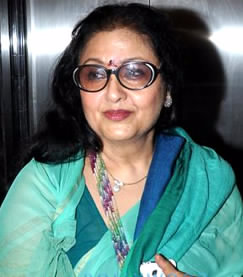
- Chandavarkar in 2014
- Born: 29 August 1950 (age 76); Dharwad, Karnataka State, India
- Occupation: Actress
- Years active: 1968–1989
- Spouses: Siddharth Bandodkar (m. 1975; died 1976); Kishore Kumar (m. 1980; died 1987)
- Children: 1
- Relatives: Dayanand Bandodkar (father-in-law); Shashikala Kakodkar (sister-in-law)

Leena Chandavarkar (born 29 August 1950) is an Indian actress who appeared in Hindi films as a leading actress and now appears in reality shows. She was active during the late 1960s and early 1970s. She played the heroine opposite many notable Hindi film actors of that era. She was frequently paired with Rajesh Khanna, Dharmendra, Jeetendra, Sanjeev Kumar, Vinod Khanna, Shammi Kapoor, Dilip Kumar, Sunil Dutt, and Raaj Kumar.

== Early life ==
Leena Chandavarkar was born to Army Officer Sreenath Chandavarkar at Dharwad in Karnataka in 1950. She comes from a Konkani family.

== Career ==
Chandavarkar came into the limelight after finishing as one of the runners-up for the Fresh Face competition organized across the country by Filmfare. Initially she worked in advertisements, and eventually ventured into film.

She was supposed to debut with the film Maseeha (1967), opposite Sunil Dutt and costarring Raaj Kumar and Mumtaz, under the direction of Sunil Dutt. The film was shelved, and she made her debut under the direction of Dutt with the movie Man ka Meet in 1968. The movie was a hit and she became an overnight star.

Between 1969 and 1979, Chandavarkar acted in many films. She was one of the topmost heroines in the early 70s, alongside Hema Malini and Mumtaz. She was cast opposite many popular heroes of that era. She gave one of her best performances in Mehboob Ki Mehndi with Rajesh Khanna in 1971. In Bairaag (1976), she acted with Dilip Kumar and an ensemble star cast of Saira Bano, Prem Chopra and Helen.

She appeared as a guest judge for the first two episodes of K for Kishore, a reality TV singing show launched by Sony TV in December 2007. She is now appearing in reality shows.

She also penned some songs for Amit Kumar and Rajesh Bambal for a music album.

== Personal life ==
Chandavarkar had an arranged marriage to her first husband, Siddharth Bandodkar, who came from a prominent Goan-Marathi political family. Shashikala Kakodkar, the elder sister of Siddharth, was then the chief minister of Goa, Daman and Diu. Siddharth was the son of Dayanand Bandodkar, the first chief minister of Goa, Daman and Diu. Siddharth died from an accidental gunshot wound, a few days into the marriage, leaving Chandavarkar a widow at age 25.

A few years later, she married playback singer Kishore Kumar. Her father initially objected because Kumar had been married three times already, and was more than 20 years older than her, but he soon came around and welcomed Kumar into the family. She has a son with Kumar named Sumeet. Kumar died in 1987, leaving Chandavarkar once again a widow at age 37. She lives with her son Sumeet, her step-son Amit Kumar, and his wife.

Chandavarkar quit Bollywood after marriage with singing legend Kishore Kumar, only to later return for two movies.

== Filmography ==
Year	Movies	Role	Co-star	Notes
1989	Mamta Ki Chhaon Mein	Leena Rai	Rajesh Khanna	Last film
1985	Sarfarosh	Sita	Jeetendra	Supporting role
1980	Zalim	Kiran	Vinod Khanna	
1980	Pyar Ajnabi Hai	Unreleased	Kishore Kumar	
1978	Daaku Aur Jawan	Seeta	Sunil Dutt, Vinod Khanna	Hit
1978	Nalayak	Seema	Jeetendra	
1977	Aafat	Inspector Chhaya	Navin Nischol	
1977	Aakhri Goli	Suman	Sunil Dutt	
1977	Naami Chor	Dr. Leena	Biswajit Chatterjee	
1977	Yaaron Ka Yaar	Bindiya	Shatrughan Sinha	
1976	Bairaag	Soniya	Dilip Kumar	
1975	Qaid	Preet	Vinod Khanna	Hit
1975	Jaggu	Geeta	Shatrughan Sinha	
1975	Ek Mahal Ho Sapno Ka	Sonia	Dharmendra	
1975	Apne Rang Hazaar	Malti	Sanjeev Kumar	
1974	Bidaai	Padma D. Das	Jeetendra	Superhit
1974	Chor Chor	Hema	Vijay Anand	
1974	Manchali	Leena	Sanjeev Kumar	Semihit
1974	Imaan	Imli	Sanjeev Kumar	
1973	Anhonee	Dr. Rekha	Sanjeev Kumar	Semihit
1973	Ek Kunwari Ek Kunwara	Neela	Rakesh Roshan	
1973	Honeymoon	Madhu Bhatnagar	Anil Dhawan	
1972	Dil Ka Raja	Geeta	Raaj Kumar	
1971	Rakhwala	Chandni	Dharmendra	
1971	Chingari	Reshma	Sanjay Khan	
1971	Preetam	Sharan B. Sinha/Bindya	Shammi Kapoor	
1971	Jaane-Anjaane	Mala	Shammi Kapoor	
1971	Main Sunder Hoon	Radha	Biswajit Chatterjee	Semihit
1971	Mehboob Ki Mehndi	Shabana	Rajesh Khanna	
1970	Humjoli	Ranibala Rai	Jeetendra	Superhit
1970	Jawab	Chanchal	Jeetendra	
1970	Saas Bhi Kabhi Bahu Thi	Sadhana Deepak Chaud	Sanjay Khan	
1968	Man Ka Meet	Aarti	Som Dutt	Semihit
