= Aafat =

1977 Indian Hindi film

- Poster
- Directed by: Atma Ram
- Written by: Ram Govind
- Produced by: Atma Ram
- Starring: Navin Nischol; Leena Chandavarkar; Mehmood; Amjad Khan; Nazir Hussain
- Music by: Nitin Mangesh
- Distributed by: Guru Dutt Films Combine
- Release date: 14 April 1977
- Country: India
- Language: Hindi

Aafat (transl. Hardship) is 1977 Indian Hindi-language crime thriller film directed by Atma Ram, starring Navin Nischol, Leena Chandavarkar, Amjad Khan, Mehmood and Nazir Hussain.

== Plot ==
Inspector Amar and Inspector Chhaya are after the criminal Hardayal. Amar and Chhaya fall in love. Amar goes beyond the call of duty to catch Hardayal and hence becomes suspended. Amar is caught by Hardayal and is held captive. Now Chhaya is supposed find the criminal Hardayal.

== Songs ==
The soundtrack was composed by Nitin Mangesh.

1. "Oye Laila Oye Laila Tere Pyar Me Majnu Rota Hai" - Kishore Kumar, Usha Mangeshkar
2. "Koi Kahe Mai Khanjar Hu" - Lata Mangeshkar
3. "Ye Nasha Jaan Meri Hai" - Lata Mangeshkar

== Cast ==
- Navin Nischol as Inspector Amar
- Leena Chandavarkar as Inspector Chhaya
- Jayshree T. as Rajni
- Mehmood as Mahesh
- Amjad Khan as Shera
- Nazir Hussain as Dindayal
- Kamal Kapoor as Police Commissioner Hardayal
- Prema Narayan as Champa
- Faryal as Jenny
- Keshto Mukherjee as Drunkard
- Tiwari
- Sajjan
- Anil Chandavarkar (first film)
