= Raja Sen =

Indian television and film director (1955–2026)

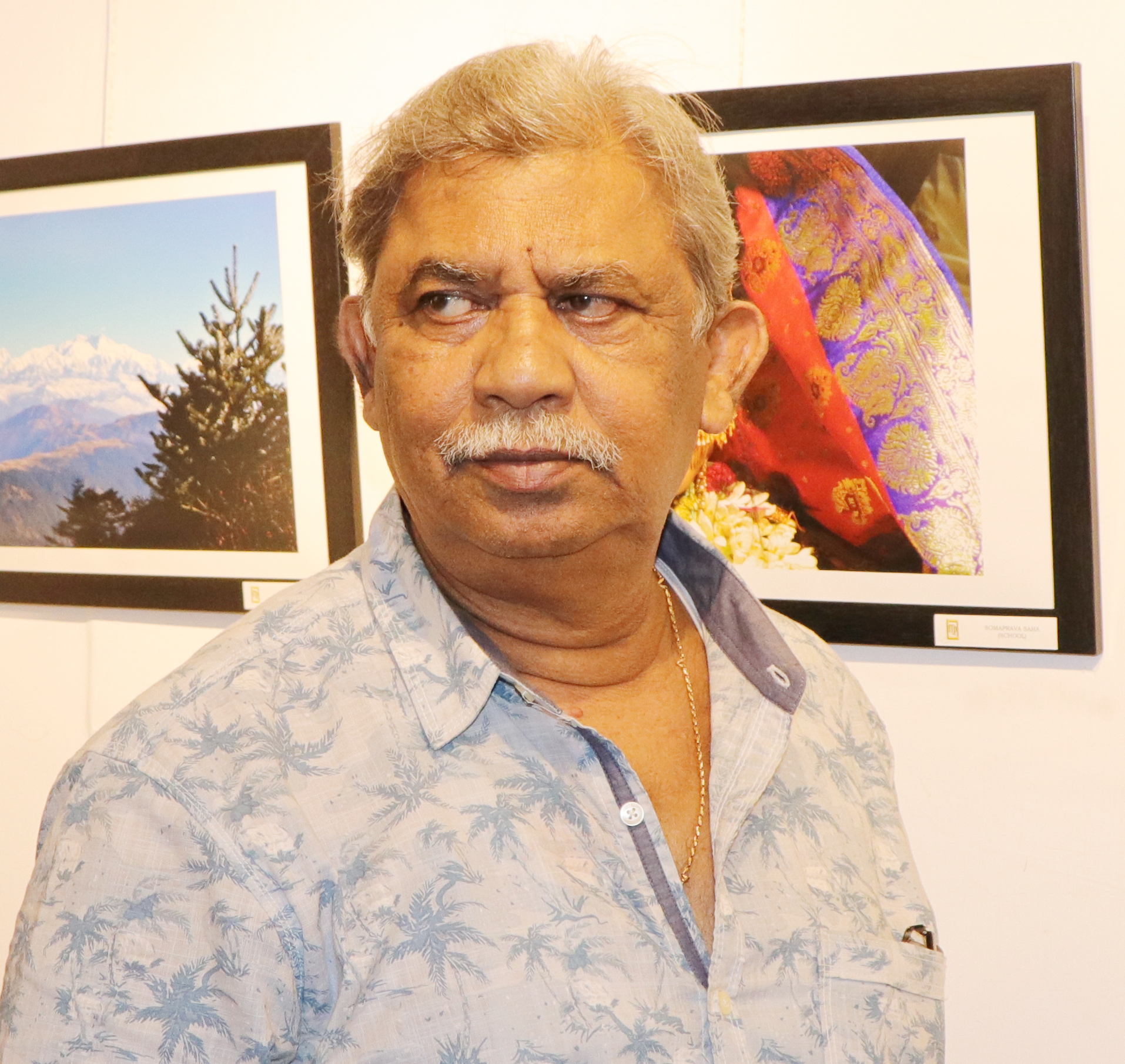
- Sen in 2019
- Born: 10 November 1955; Calcutta, West Bengal, India
- Died: 16 August 2026 (aged 70); Kolkata, West Bengal, India
- Occupations: Film director; television director
- Spouse: Papiya Sen
- Website: www.rajasensfilms.com

Raja Sen (10 November 1955 – 16 August 2026) was an Indian film and television director who was the winner of three National Film Awards from Kolkata, West Bengal, India. He was the father of Subhasree Sen and Sreyoshi Sen.

== Career ==
He first received recognition with Subarnalata (1997), a teleserial. He followed it up with Adarsha Hindu Hotel, Arogyo Niketan, and a few episodes of Desh Amaar Desh.

He also documented the real life paradigm of the personalities of Bengal's world of art and culture, namely, Suchitra Mitra, Tapan Sinha, Sombhu Mitra, Subhas Mukhopadhyay.

== Personal life and death ==
Sen was married to Indian actress Papiya Sen. He had two daughters.

Sen died at the SSKM Hospital in Kolkata, on 16 August 2026, at the age of 70.

== Filmography ==
=== Feature film ===
- Damu (1996) – Cast: Raghuvir Yadav, Satya Banerjee, Monoj Mitra, Sabyasachi Chakrabarty, Rimi Sen (Child Artist).
- Atmiyo Swajan (1999) – Cast: Soumitra Chatterjee, Supriya Devi, Dipankar De, Sabyasachi Chakrabarty, Rituparna Sengupta, Shakuntala Barua, Alok Mukherjee, Ashok Mitra, Asit Mukherjee, Chaitali Ghoshal, June Malia, Papiya Sen, Piyush Ganguly, Pradip Chakraborty, Rimi Sen (Child Artist), Tridib Ghosh.
- Chakrabyuhya (2000) – Cast: Indrajeet, Chiranjeet, Anjan Srivastava, Rituparna Sen Gupta, Indrani Haldar, Chitra Sen, June Maliya.
- Desh (2002) – Cast: Jaya Bhaduri, Abhishek Bachchan, Sabyasachi Chakravarthy, Subhendu Chatterjee, Gyanesh Mukherjee, Nayana Das, Monu Mukherjee, Kaushik Sen, Rajesh Sharma, Dulal Lahiri.
- Debipaksha (2004) – Cast: Soumitra Chatterjee, Rituparna Sengupta, Satabdi Roy, Koel Mullick.
- Viswa O Arjun (2006) – Cast: Mayukh Mukherjee, Ashok Mukherjee, Indarni Pal, Anindya Bhaduri, Ipshita Nandi
- Krishnakanter Will (2007) – Cast: Jeet, Soumitra Chatterjee, Swastika Mukherjee.
- Tinmurti (2009) – Cast: Ranjit Mullick, Dipankar Dey, Manoj Mitra, Paoli Dam.
- Laboratory (2010) – Cast: Raveena Tandon (debut in the Bengali film industry), Arpita Chatterjee, Sabyasachi Chakraborty, Ranjit Mullick.
- Moubone Aaj (2011) – Cast: Ranjit Mullick, Manoj Mitra, Dipankar Dey, Rahul, Priyanka and Rachana Banerjee.
- Colonel (2012) – Cast: Chiranjit, Sabyasachi, Kharaj, Saheb, Shakar, Sudip, and Tapas Paul.
- Maya Mridanga (2016) – Cast: Debshankar Haldar, Rituparna Sengupta, Paoli Dam, Gautam Haldar

=== Documentaries ===
- Filmmaker for Freedom (a film on Tapan Sinha)
- Subhas Mukhopadhyay
- Suchitra Mitra
- Sambhu Mitra – 3 hours documentation by EZCC
- Jyotirmoyee Devi
- Alkaap – a dying folk culture
- Itihasher Kolkata (5 episodes on the heritage of Kolkata)
- Samaresh Basu (ICIL)
- Rosogolla – brand ambassador of Bengal (EZCC)
- The Greatest Bengali of The Millennium – (a film on Sheikh Mujibur Rahman, BBC announced the founding father of Bangladesh as the Greatest Bengali of all time voted by Bengalis worldwide.)

=== Television serials ===
- Kolkata Kolkata
- Adarsha Hindu Hotel
- Subarnalata
- Samparka
- Arogya Niket
- Anirban
- Anjuman
- Streeash Charitram
- Tarasankarer Chhoto Galpo

== Awards ==
- 1993 – Documentary Suchitra Mitra – National Film Award for Best Arts/Cultural Film
- 1997 – Debut feature film Damu – National Film Award for Best Children's Film
- 1997 – Damu – Best Film – Shiromoni Award
- 1997 – Damu – Best Audinence Juvenile Award in Dhaka International Film Festival
- 1999 – Atmiyo Swajan – National Film Award for Best Film on Family Welfare
- 1999 – Atmiyo Swajan – Cairo International Film Festival
