= Paadhai Theriyudhu Paar =

1960 film by Nemai Ghosh

- Poster
- Directed by: Nemai Ghosh
- Written by: R. K. Kannan
- Starring: K. Vijayan; S. V. Subbaiah
- Cinematography: Nemai Ghosh
- Edited by: R. Devarajan
- Music by: M. B. Sreenivasan
- Production company: Kumari Films
- Release date: 18 November 1960
- Running time: 168 minutes
- Country: India
- Language: Tamil

Paadhai Theriyudhu Paar (transl. Look, the path is visible) is a 1960 Indian Tamil-language drama film directed by Nemai Ghosh. The film stars K. Vijayan and S. V. Subbaiah. It won the National Film Award for Best Feature Film in Tamil along with Kalathur Kannamma.

== Cast ==
Male cast

- S. V. Sahasranamam
- S. V. Subbaiah
- T. S. Muthaiah
- T. K. Balachandran
- V. Gopalakrishnan
- R. Muthuraman
- A. Veerappan
- N. Paranthaman
- S. Prabhakar
- S. Kulmagadhu
- D. V. Ramasami
- Rajavelan
- Dhanapal
- Seshu

Female cast

- Sundari Bai
- S. R. Janaki
- Chandini
- Baby Kaplana

Newcomers

- K. Vijayan as Murugesan
- L. Vijayalakshmi

== Production ==
Nemai Ghosh and M. B. Sreenivasan formed a production company called Kumari Films, with contributions from more than 50 shareholders. Each of them contributed an amount ranging from a minimum sum of ₹500 to a maximum of ₹5,000 to start the banner. Kumari Films' inaugural production Paadhai Theriyudhu Paar was launched by the communist leader P. Jeevanandham. The film was the second directorial venture of Ghosh, who also worked as cinematographer. Some journalists believe it is the first crowdfunded Tamil film.

== Themes ==
Paadhai Theriyudhu Paar addresses the trade union movement of India, and was scripted keeping the Communist Party of India (CPI) ideology in mind.

== Soundtrack ==
The music was composed by M. B. Sreenivasan, while the lyrics were written by Jayakanthan, Pattukkottai Kalyanasundaram and K. C. S. Arunachalam. Vaali wrote the song "Koduthadellam Koduthan" for this film but it was rejected by Ghosh, and instead used in Padagotti (1964). The song "Thennankeetru" is based on Valaji raga, and was set to tune with a xylophone.

Title	Singers	Lyrics	Length
"Azhutha Kanneerum Paalaagumaa"	P. Susheela	Jeyakanthan	
"Chinna Chinna Mookuthiyaam"	T. M. Soundararajan	K. C. S. Arunachalam	06:11
"Maasil Veenaiyum"	S. Janaki, A. S. Mahadevan	Tevaram	03:35
"Raasaa Maga Polirundhe"	A. L. Raghavan	K. C. S. Arunachalam	03:24
"Thennankeetru Oonjalile"	P. B. Sreenivas, S. Janaki	Jayakanthan	04:14
"Unmai Orunaal Veliyaagum"	Thiruchi Loganathan	Pattukottai Kalyanasundaram	

== Release and reception ==
Paadhai Theriyudhu Paar was released on 18 November 1960. In July, select reels of the film were made available for previewing as the final film was not yet complete. The Indian Express then wrote, "The plot unfolds itself with easy tempo and unflagging interest. The songs are natural and exceptionally homely. Photography and sound recording are superb". Reviewing the complete version on 19 November, they praised the film for minimal dramatisation and more naturalism. Despite critical acclaim, the film did not succeed commercially; the distributors complained that L. Vijayalakshmi did not dance, to which the director replied, "[Vijayalakshmi] knows how to dance, but the character she plays in the film does not!" According to historian Randor Guy, "internal dissensions spoiled the film's release and caused it to flop."

== Bibliography ==
- Rajadhyaksha, Ashish; Willemen, Paul (1998) [1994]. Encyclopaedia of Indian Cinema. British Film Institute and Oxford University Press. ISBN 0-19-563579-5.
