= Khana Baraha =

Bengali film

- Directed by: Bijoy Bose
- Screenplay by: Bijoy Bose
- Story by: Manmatha Roy
- Produced by: Ashim Sarkar
- Starring: Uttam Kumar; Sandhya Roy; Santu Mukhopadhyay; Ruma Guha Thakurta; Samit Bhanja
- Cinematography: Bijoy Ghosh
- Edited by: Baidyanath Chattopadhyay
- Music by: Shyamal Mitra
- Release date: 1981
- Country: India
- Language: Bengali

Khana Baraha is a Bengali historical drama film directed by Bijoy Bose and produced by Ashim Sarkar. This film was based on the story of Manmatha Roy about the life of Khana and Varāhamihira, the ancient mathematician astrologers of India. It was released on 29 May 1981.

== Plot ==
Baraha is an astrologer and member of emperor Vikramaditya's Navaratnas. He abandoned his new born son in the sea. The baby reaches the coast of Singhal and grows up as Mihir with miraculous astrological knowledge. He marries Khana, another talented lady poet. They come to India to search Mihir's parents.

== Cast ==
- Uttam Kumar as Baraha
- Sandhya Roy as Khana
- Santu Mukhopadhyay as Mihir
- Ruma Guha Thakurta as Baraha's Wife
- Samit Bhanja as Kamandak
- Gyanesh Mukherjee as Bhairav
- Mrinal Mukherjee
- Asit Baran as King Vikramaditya
- Shekhar Chatterjee as Dharmadhikar
- Biplab Chatterjee as Tilak
- Alpana Goswami
