= Naami Chor =

- Directed by: Kamal Mehra
- Written by: Prayag Raj
- Starring: Biswajeet; Shatrughan Sinha; Leena Chandavarkar
- Music by: Kalyanji–Anandji
- Release date: 1977
- Country: India
- Language: Hindi

Naami Chor is a 1977 Bollywood action film directed by Kamal Mehra.

== Cast ==
- Biswajeet
- Shatrughan Sinha
- Leena Chandavarkar
- Keshto Mukherjee
- Durga Khote
- Dev Kumar
- Hiralal
- Gajanan Jagirdar

== Songs ==
1. "Kehte Hai Mujuko Raja, Mai Bajata Hu Dil Ka Baaja" – Kishore Kumar
2. "Aapse Mujhe Aapse Maniye Na ManiyePyar Ho Hi Gaya" – Asha Bhosle
3. "Sukh Aur Dukh Is Duniya Me" – Mukesh
4. "Aaye Hai Jo Mehfil Me, Kuch Karke Dikha Denge" – Mahendra Kapoor, Asha Bhosle
5. "Gori Tori Mathe Pe Saj Gayi Bindiya" – Usha Mangeshkar, Asha Bhosle
