= Ramananda Sengupta =

- রমানন্দ সেনগুপ্ত
- Born: 8 May 1916; Dacca, Bengal Presidency, British India (present-day Dhaka, Bangladesh)
- Died: 23 August 2017 (aged 101); Kolkata, West Bengal, India
- Education: Visva-Bharati University
- Occupation: Cinematographer
- Years active: 1938–1976

Ramananda Sengupta (8 May 1916 – 23 August 2017) was an Indian cinematographer. He was born in Dhaka in 1916 and became a centenarian in 2016.

Sengupta stood behind the lens in more than 70 films. His work in cinematography began in 1938 when he joined as an apprentice at the Aurora Film Corporation in Kolkata (formerly Calcutta). He worked with G. K. Mehta, as first assistant on the 1941 film Kurukshetra. Sengupta's first independent work was Purbaraag directed by Ardhendu Mukherjee. Sengupta worked with French director Jean Renoir when he came to Kolkata to shoot his 1951 film The River.

In 2007 Utsav Mukherjee prepared a documentary Under Exposed about Sengupta. Siddhartha Maity has written a book and made a documentary, Alor Frame e Chhayar Saaj (Framing Light Against the Shadows) about Sengupta.

== Filmography ==
- Dakghar (Bengali)
- Bindur Chhele (Bengali)
- Kankabatir Ghat (Bengali)
- Personal Assistant (Bengali)
- Bandhu (Bengali)
- Hangsamithun by Partha Pratim Bandopadhyay
- Dakharkara (Bengali)
- Nagarik (1977, Bengali)
- Teen Bhubaner Pare (1969, Bengali)
- Nishithe (1961, Bengali)
- Megh (1960, Bengali)
- Sri Lokanath (1960, Oriya)
- Headmaster (1959, Bengali)
- Shilpi (1956, Bengali)
- Raat Bhore (1955, the first film by Mrinal Sen)
- Ghoom Bhangar Gaan by Utpal Dutta
- The River (1951)
- Purbaatra (1947)
- Purbaraag (1946, Bengali)

=== Documentaries ===
- Modern and Ancient Architecture of India
- Religion
- Autobiography of an Elephant
- Life in the Backwater of Malabar Cochin
