= Damu (film) =

- Film poster
- Directed by: Raja Sen
- Screenplay by: Mohit Chatterjee
- Story by: Narayan Gangopadhyay
- Based on: Panchaananer Haati
- Produced by: Ashok Bose; Tapas Ghosh; Raja Sen
- Starring: Raghuvir Yadav; Tarun Kumar Chatterjee; Sabyasachi Chakrabarty; Rimi Sen; Gyanesh Mukherjee
- Cinematography: Shakti Banerjee
- Edited by: Snehasish Ganguly
- Music by: Jatileshwar Mukherjee
- Release date: 13 June 1996
- Running time: 2:36:00
- Country: India
- Language: Bengali

Damu (Bengali: দামু) is a 1996 Indian Bengali-language drama film directed by Raja Sen and produced by the Government of West Bengal. It is based on Narayan Gangopadhyay's novel Ponchanoner Haati (Bengali: পঞ্চাননের হাতি) and is Sen's directorial debut. The film was released on 26 October 1996 and won National Film Award for Best Children's Film.

== Plot ==
Damu is an innocent orphan who lives in the village with an old man Panchanan. He develops a friendship with Panchanan's granddaughter Runku. One day he carelessly promises her an elephant ride through the village. But it is impossible to manage an elephant in the village, hence Runku is disappointed. To fulfill the promise, Damu sets out in search of an elephant. In his journey, he faces humiliation, taunting, harassment but does not lose hope. Finally, Damu comes across a circus but the manager refuses to meet him. Circumstances arise where Damu saves the circus from a gang of a robbers. Out of gratitude, the circus manager allows Damu to borrow an elephant and Runku gets her elephant ride in the village.

== Cast ==
- Raghuvir Yadav as Damu
- Sabyasachi Chakraborty as Potai Chor
- Manoj Mitra as Daroga
- Gyanesh Mukherjee as Owner of Circus
- Satya Bandyopadhyay as Panchanan
- Tarun Kumar Chatterjee as Jagai Ghosh
- Rimi Sen as Runku
- Dulal Lahiri as Bhatu
- Ajit Bandyopadhyay as Nibaran Chakraborty
- Anamika Saha as Badan's wife
- Monu Mukherjee as Kalim Sheikh
- Smita Sinha as Runku's Grandmother
- Dhiman Chakraborty as Badan
- Gautam Dey as Nitai, Runku's father

=== Accolades ===
List of awards and nominations
Organisation	Date	Category	Recipients and nominees	Result	Ref.(s)
National Film Awards	1996	Best Children's Film	Raja Sen	Won	
