= Yaaron Ka Yaar =

Yaarron Ka Yaar
- Directed by: A. Bhimsingh
- Produced by: K.B.Chahdha
- Starring: Shatrughan Sinha; Leena Chandavarkar
- Music by: Kalyanji-Anandji
- Release date: 1977
- Country: India
- Language: Hindi

Yaarron Ka Yaar is a 1977 Bollywood film, starring Shatrughan Sinha, Leena Chandavarkar in lead roles and directed by A. Bhimsingh. The music was composed by Kalyanji-Anandji.

== Plot ==
Low-caste Nathu becomes a proud father of a son and is asked to fetch some water to clean the child. When he goes to the well, he finds it dry, and goes on to a private pond, owned by Zamindar Jaimal Singh. In Jaimal's house too there is merry-making as his wife has given birth to a baby boy as well, and preparations are made to name the child. When Jaimal finds out that Nathu has polluted the water, he takes his men and severely beats up Nathu, leaving his crippled, and sets fire to the entire village. Nathu loses his son, and is unable to locate his pregnant wife. Angered at this injustice, he abducts Jaimal's son, and disappears into the night. Years later, crippled Nathu has nurtured Jaimal's son, named him Shera, and has taught him how to be a thief. Shera has learned well, but is apprehended and arrested by the police and sent to jail. After his return, Nathu tells him the atrocities inflicted by Jaimal, and Shera swears to avenge this, and sets about to destroy Jaimal and his family.

== Cast ==
- Shatrughan Sinha as Pratap / Shera
- Leena Chandavarkar as Bindiya
- Premnath as Nathu
- Helen as Rita
- Ramayan Tiwari as Jaimal Singh
- Indrani Mukherjee as Shakuntala (Jaimal's Daughter)
- Achala Sachdev as Dhanno (Nathu's Wife)
- Ramesh Deo as Shekhar
- Asit Sen as Milk Seller
- Yunus Parvez as Money Lender
- Marutirao Parab as Police Constable

== Soundtrack ==
Song	Singer
"Main Yaaron Ka Hoon Yaar"	Kishore Kumar
"Meri Jaan, Mujh Pe Kar Tu"	Manna Dey
"Pehli Pehli Baar Mujhko Yeh Kya Ho Gaya"	Mohammed Rafi, Asha Bhosle
"Mere Lal, Mujh Pe Kar Tu"	Asha Bhosle
"Dekho Mehfil Mein Main"	Asha Bhosle
