= Jharh =

1979 Bengali film

Jharh (The Storm) is a 1979 Bengali biographical drama film directed and written by Utpal Dutt and produced by Government of West Bengal. The movie is based on the life of Henry Louis Vivian Derozio, a social revolutionary.

== Plot ==
The film portrays on the life of Henry Derozio, a leader of Bengal Renaissance and his students, members of the Young Bengal.

== Cast ==
- Ujjal Sengupta as Derozio
- Rabi Ghosh
- Shobha Sen
- Utpal Dutt as Radhakanta Deb
- Sumitra Mukherjee
- Ramaprasad Banik
- Haradhan Bannerjee
- Satya Banerjee
- Rajkumar Biswas
- Sagarika Adhikari
