= Ramkinkar Baij (film) =

- Directed by: Ritwik Ghatak
- Produced by: Ritwik Ghatak

A scene from the documentary

Ramkinkar Baij (or Ramkinkar)- is an incomplete personality study or documentary on sculptor Ramkinkar Baij created by legendary filmmaker Ritwik Ghatak. He started creating the film in 1975. The film was almost complete but it still remained unfinished for the death of Ritwik Ghatak.

== Film ==
In July 1975 Ghatak commenced shooting on the sculptor at Shantiniketan for a stretch of four days. The movie is a biographical (personality study) film where Baij has been featured as a political icon too. In the film, Ramkinkar Baij speaks about the problems that he faces in his life. He speaks about how he has shielded his dripping roof with his oil paintings. Ghatak asks him what he is going to do for the show that is coming soon. Ramkinkar answers to this question: "As the paintings are made by oil on canvas water will not do any damage to them. I can pull them out for the show. But my worry is what I will replace them with to stop the rainwater. It costs hundred rupees to buy grass for thatching. It is very expensive.’

== Cast and crew ==
- Producer, Director, Screenplay: Ritwik Ghatak
- Financial assistance: Mohan Biswas
- Photography: Nirmal, Sunil Jana

== See also ==
- List of works of Ritwik Ghatak
