= Sadhu Babar Lathi =

- The poster for the film Sadhu Babar Lathi
- Directed by: Sanghita Banerjee
- Written by: Sirshendu Mukherjee
- Produced by: A. V. Production
- Starring: Ramaprasad Banik
- Music by: Antara Chowdhury
- Release date: 21 November 2008
- Running time: 135 minutes
- Country: India
- Language: Bengali

Sadhu Babar Lathi (Bengali: সাধু বাবার লাঠি "") is a 2008 Bengali drama film directed by Sanghita Banerjee based on Sirshendu Mukherjee novel by the same name.

== Plot ==
Nabin Saha gets a stick of a dead Sadhu Baba (Saint) from his uncle. He takes the stick with him for a journey. On the way a local crook Nemai Roy makes friends with Nabin. When he learns that Nabin would cross the haunted "Ghurbuner Math" alone with Rs. 30,000/- he plans to rob Nabin. He ties up with the dacoits. Sota Gunda and slowly misleads the simple Nabin toward his den. Meanwhile, Nabin's friend Jagai and Madai advance towards at the same "Ghurbuner Math" in search of a hidden treasure but sense something wrong. They cross the field to reach Harirpurer Kella (fort) to discover Nabin fighting the dacoits alone with Sadhu Baba's Stick. The three musketeers win the battle. But the dacoits send Nemai once again to steal the stick after knowing its supernatural prowess. When Nemai comes back to Nabin's village Haripur he reveals that the stick already become famous. Two other villainous people Hiru (a dacoit) and Panu (the local hoodlum) approach Nemai and threaten him to get the stick. Though after a lot of fuss Nemai manages to steal the stick from Nabin's courtyard, he can do nothing with it. In fact no one can bear fruits from it as all the three gangs clash with each other only to bash up themselves. Nabin, Jagai and Madai get back the stick and install it upon the grave of Sadhu Baba.

== Cast ==
- Kali Banerjee
- Mrinal Mukherjee
- Ramaprasad Banik
- Kalyan Chatterjee
- Manowar Aftab
- Mithai Banerjee
- Sabita Banerjee
- Sobhan Banerjee
- Deepsikha Basu
- Nimai Lahiri
- Satu Majumdar
