= Bari Theke Paliye =

1958 film

- Directed by: Ritwik Ghatak
- Written by: Ritwik Ghatak (screenplay), Shibram Chakraborty (the original novel)
- Produced by: Chitrakalpa
- Starring: Kali Banerjee; Gyanesh Mukherjee; Keshto Mukherjee; Jahar Roy
- Cinematography: Dinen Gupta
- Edited by: Ramesh Joshi
- Music by: Salil Chowdhury
- Production company: L.B. Films International
- Release date: 24 July 1959
- Running time: 117 min.
- Language: Bengali

Bari Theke Paliye (English-language title: Runaway or The Runaway) is a 1959 coming-of-age Bengali film by director Ritwik Ghatak.

This film was directed by alternative Indian filmmaker Ritwik Ghatak in Kolkata (then Calcutta) based on the same name novel by Shibram Chakraborty. The plot is about a misbehaving boy who runs away from his village and goes to Calcutta.

== Plot ==
Eight-year-old Kanchan is always getting into mischief, playing pranks at home and around the village. He sees his father as a cruel demon who imprisons and oppresses his mother. In his dreams, the big city is El Dorado — Kolkata — but when he arrives, he finds that reality is harsher than he expected. The glimpses of reality he catches, however, are harsher than he expected, and the people he meets offer him an alternative view of the city. He learns the dialectics of life in the City of Joy: love and hate, honesty and dishonesty. He meets Mini, a small, loving girl, and her family, as well as folk singers, street hawkers, magicians, beggars and thieves. After struggling to survive, he experiences life as it is, only to return home to his village. This time, he returns a more mature person, having realised that his father is not a demon, but another victim of poverty who remains a loving father.

== Cast ==
- Parambhattarak Lahiri as Kanchan
- Gyanesh Mukherjee as Kanchan's father
- Kali Banerjee as Haridas
- Krishnajaya Gupta as Mini
- Nripati Chattopadhyay
- Jahor Roy
- Bijon Bhattacharya
- Keshto Mukherjee as Magician
- Padma Devi as Kanchan's mother
- Niti Pandit as Mini's mother
- Mani Shrimai
- Satindra Bhattacharya
- Shailen Ghosh

== Soundtrack ==
- Ore–ore Nore–nore, Shonkure... Bulbul Bhaja...
- O, Ami Onek, Ghuriya... Koilkatta
- Mago Amay Deko Na Ko Aar

== See also ==
- List of works of Ritwik Ghatak
