= Bedeni (film) =

- Directed by: Ritwik Ghatak
- Based on: Tarashankar Bandopadhyay's short story Nagini
- Produced by: Sunil Krishna Roy
- Starring: Prabha Debi; Shobha Sen
- Country: India
- Language: Bengali

Bedeni, also known as Arup Kotha (1951–52), is an unfinished Bengali language film directed by filmmaker Ritwik Ghatak. This was the first movie in which Ritwik worked as a director.

== Making ==
The film was based on a short story of Tarashankar Bandopadhyay named Nagini. In 1950, when the shooting started the director of this movie was Nirmal Dey. The shooting of the film was arranged in Rupashree studio, Park Circus, Kolkata. After the studio got devastated by fire in an accident, they started shooting in Indrapuri Studio. After some time, the shooting of the film had to be stopped mainly for financial problems. In 1951 Ritwik Ghatak was appointed as the director of this film. Ghatak made some changes in the storyline, rewrote screenplay and renamed the film Arup Kotha. In 1952 the film unit shot for 20 days in Bolpur and Ghatshila in the bank of river Subarnarekha. But, for some technical problem in the cameras used in the shooting the film did not expose. So, the film was abandoned.

== Cast and crew ==
=== Cast ===
- Shobha Sen as Pingala
- Bijon Bhattacharya
- Keshto Mukherjee
- Ketaki Dutta as Chiti
- Mita Chaterjee as Gokhri
- Prabha Debi as Shapla
- Abhi Bhatacharya as Dhona
- Maharshi Manoranjan Bhattacharya as Sardar
- Mumtaz Ahmed Khan
- Parijat Bose

=== Crew ===
- Production: Sunil Krishna Roy.
- Direction and screenplay: Ritwik Ghatak.
- Story: Tarashankar Bandopadhyay.
- Cinematography: Sachin Dasgupta.
