= Qaid (film) =

- Directed by: Atma Ram
- Produced by: Atma Ram
- Starring: Vinod Khanna; Leena Chandavarkar; Kamini Kaushal
- Music by: Nitin Mangesh
- Release date: 21 May 1975
- Running time: 2 hours 10 min
- Country: India
- Language: Hindi

Qaid is a 1975 Hindi thriller drama film produced and directed by Atma Ram. The film stars Vinod Khanna, Leena Chandavarkar, Kamini Kaushal, Nazir Hussain, Mehmood, Keshto Mukherjee and K. N. Singh.

== Plot ==
The movie revolves with the life of an orphan girl of a millionaire. She works as maidservant in the house of Advocate Jai Saxena. Suddenly she informs the advocate that someone is trying to kill her and her family and friends can not recognise her. Jai wants to give her shelter. Next day police arrives there and tell that this woman's real name is Ragini, a killer.

== Cast ==
- Vinod Khanna as Advocate Jai Saxena
- Leena Chandavarkar as Preet
- Jayshree T. as Julie
- Mehmood as Bajrangi
- Kamini Kaushal as Mrs. Saxena
- Nazir Hussain as Rai Bahadur Tulsinath
- Keshto Mukherjee as Kanhaiyalal
- Satyendra Kapoor as Inspector L.G. Kaushik
- K. N. Singh as Dr. Trivedi
- Sajjan as Mr. Verma
- Rajesh Behl as Rakesh
- Mridula Rani as Sarita's Mother
- Sameer Khan as Heera

== Soundtrack ==
All songs were composed by Nitin–Mangesh and written by Maya Govind.

- "Deewana Hoon Pyaar Ka" - Kishore Kumar
- "Ye To Zindagi Hai" - Kishore Kumar, Nitin Mangesh
- "Yeh Dil De De De Yeh Jaan Le Le" - Amit Kumar, Anjali
- "Beliya Aale Beliya" - Asha Bhosle, Nitin Mangesh
- "Yahan Kaun Hai Asli Kaun Hai Nakli" - Lata Mangeshkar
- "Karale Saaf Karale Zara Tu Saaf Karale" - Usha Mangeshkar, Mehmood
- "Kaali Raat Aai Nahi" - Anjali Ram
