= Ajantrik =

1958 film

- Directed by: Ritwik Ghatak
- Written by: Subodh Ghosh (short story); Ritwik Ghatak (story elaboration)
- Starring: Kali Banerjee; Shriman Deepak; Kajal Gupta; Keshto Mukherjee
- Cinematography: Dinen Gupta
- Edited by: Ramesh Joshi
- Music by: Ali Akbar Khan
- Production company: L. B Films International
- Release date: 23 May 1958
- Running time: 104 min.
- Country: India
- Language: Bengali

Ajantrik (known internationally as The Unmechanical, The Mechanical Man or The Pathetic Fallacy) is a 1958 Indian Bengali film written and directed by Ritwik Ghatak. The film is adapted from a Bengali short story of the same name written by Subodh Ghosh.

A comedy-drama film, Ajantrik is one of the earliest Indian films to portray an inanimate object, in this case an automobile, as a character in the story. It achieves this through the use of sounds recorded post-production to emphasize the car's bodily functions and movements.

The film was considered for a special entry in the Venice Film Festival in 1959.

== Plot ==
Bimal is a taxi-driver in a small provincial town. He lives alone. His taxi (an old 1920 Chevrolet jalopy which he named Jagaddal) is his only companion and, although very battered, it is the apple of Bimal's eye. The film shows episodes from his life in the industrial wasteland, transporting people from one place to another.

== Critical Response ==
Film critic Georges Sadoul shared his experience of watching the film in this way. He said, "What does 'Ajantrik' mean? I don't know and I believe no one in Venice Film Festival knew...I can't tell the whole story of the film...there was no subtitle for the film. But I saw the film spellbound till the very end". According to the noted Bengali poet and German scholar Alokeranjan Dasgupta, "The merciless conflict of ethereal nature and mechanised civilization, through the love of taxi driver Bimal and his pathetic vehicle Jagaddal seems to be a unique gift of...modernism."

== Cast ==
- Kali Banerjee as Bimal
- Gangapada Basu
- Satindra Bhattacharya
- Tulsi Chakraborty
- Anil Chatterjee
- Shriman Deepak
- Kajal Gupta as Young woman
- Gyanesh Mukherjee as Mechanic
- Keshto Mukherjee
- Sita Mukherjee as Bulaki

== See also ==
- List of works of Ritwik Ghatak
