= Ichhapuran =

1970 film in Bengali language

Ichhapuran (Wish Fulfilment) is a 1970 Bengali comedy drama film directed by Mrinal Sen produced by the Children’s Film Society, based on the same name short story of Rabindranath Tagore. This is the only children’s film made by director Mrinal Sen in his entire career.

== Plot ==
It revolves around the life of a young mischievous boy Sushil and his school teacher father Subal. Sushil is not interested in studies at all and always likes to play. He wishes to be like his father, having liberty to enjoy life like an adult person can. On the other hand Subal also wishes to be young like Sushil. One day their wishes are fulfilled by God and their bodies get swapped. After huge confusion and comical situation they finally desire to get back to their original selves.

== Cast ==
- Shekhar Chatterjee as Subal
- Sadhu Meher
- Surajit Nandi
- Sova Sen as Sushil's mother
- Nimai Ghosh
