= Harshabardhan and Gobardhan =

Bengali fictional humorous characters by Shibram Chakraborty

Harshabardhan হর্ষবর্ধন -
- Harshabardhan - Gobardhan character
- A cover of Digbijoyi Harshabardhan illustrated by Purnendu Pattrea and published by Ananda Publishers, one of a number of books featuring short stories with Harshabardhan
- Created by: Shibram Chakraborty

In-universe information
- Occupation: Black-marketeer
- Family: ? (spouse)
- Relatives: Gobardhan (brother)
- Religion: Hindu
- Nationality: Indian

Gobardhan গোবর্ধন
- Harshabardhan - Gobardhan character
- Created by: Shibram Chakraborty

In-universe information
- Occupation: Unemployed
- Relatives: Habardhan (brother)
- Religion: Hindu
- Nationality: Indian

Harshabardhan (Bengali: হর্ষবর্ধন) and Gobardhan (Bengali: গোবর্ধন) are humorous fictional characters in Bengali literature created by Shibram Chakraborty. Harshabardhan along with his younger brother Gobardhan, his wife, and the author Shibram are the subject of a number of satirical short stories. A characteristic of these stories is acerbic wit, play on words, and a characteristic goodnaturedness on the part of the characters. Harshabardhan is a successful black-marketeer dealing in timber who was born in Tezpur, Assam, migrates and lives in Ranaghat, West Bengal. Often to hide his ignorance on day-to-day matters, he comes up with outlandish explanations to impress his devoted younger brother and wife.

== Character ==
"Harshabardhan" means whose wealth is joy and his brother's name, "Gobardhan" whose wealth consists of cow-dung.
