= Kato Ajanare (film) =

- Directed by: Ritwik Ghatak
- Based on: Kato Ajanare by Mani Shankar Mukherjee
- Country: India
- Language: Bengali

Kato Ajanare (1959) is an unfinished Bengali drama film directed by Ritwik Ghatak. The storyline was based on a Bengali novel written by Mani Shankar Mukherjee with the same title. The film was shot on a 20-day schedule. The shooting was complete, except the court scene. The film was discontinued and abandoned for mainly financial and some other problems.

Shooting was arranged in the technician's studio for indoor shooting and Kolkata (then Calcutta) high court area for outdoor shooting. Seven reels were restored later by Ritwik Memorial Trust.

== Cast and crew ==
=== Cast ===
- Anil Chatterjee as Shankar
- Chhabi Biswas as Rempini
- Kali Banerjee as Noel Barwell
- Utpal Dutta as Dutch sailor
- Ashim Kumar
- Karuna Banerjee
- Geeta Dey

=== Crew ===
- Producer: Mihir Laha
- Direction: Ritwik Ghatak
- Story: Mani Shankar Mukherjee
- Screenplay: Ritwik Ghatak
- Cinematography: Dilip Ranjan Mukherjee
- Editing: Ramen Joshi

== See also ==
- Bagalar Banga Darshan
- Bedeni
- List of works of Ritwik Ghatak
