= Rakhwala (1971 film) =

- Poster
- Directed by: Adurthi Subba Rao
- Screenplay by: Inder Raj Anand; Prem Kapoor; R.M. Veerappan
- Produced by: T. Govindarajan; S. Krishnamoorthy
- Starring: Dharmendra; Leena Chandavarkar; Vinod Khanna
- Cinematography: Roy P.L.
- Edited by: T.Krishna, BA
- Music by: Kalyanji Anandji
- Release date: 17 September 1971
- Country: India
- Language: Hindi

Rakhwala (transl. Protector) is a 1971 Indian Hindi-language action thriller film directed by Adurthi Subba Rao. The film stars Dharmendra, Leena Chandavarkar and Vinod Khanna. It is a remake of the 1967 Tamil film Kaavalkaaran.

== Cast ==
- Dharmendra ... Deepak Kumar
- Leena Chandavarkar ... Chandni
- Vinod Khanna ... Shyam
- Madan Puri ... Boxing Chairman Jwalaprasad
- Jagdeep ... Gopi
- Rakesh Pandey ... Suresh
- Rajan Haksar ... Jwalaprasad's Manager
- Keshav Rana... Police Commissioner
- Randhir ... Dr. Girdharilal
- Shyam Kumar (as Sham Kumar)
- Raj Kishore ... Bartender
- Sanjana ... Girija
- Baby Gayatri ... Pinky

== Soundtrack ==
The music was composed by Kalyanji Anandji. The author Sujata Dev stated that the song "Rehne Do Gile Shikwe", a Rafi-Asha duet, is an "excellent example of the adeptness in unifying classical and contemporary music in the same song."

#	Title	Singer(s)	Lyrics
1	"Rahne Do Gile Shikwe"	Mohammed Rafi, Asha Bhosle	Rajinder Krishan
2	"Mere Dil Ne Jo Maanga"	Lata Mangeshkar	Rajinder Krishan
3	"Tere Nain Mere Nain Ek Ho gaye"	Mohammed Rafi, Lata Mangeshkar	Indivar
4	"Tere Umar Ki Phoolwari"	Lata Mangeshkar	Rajinder Krishan
5	"Tu Itna Samajh Le Sanam"	Mohammed Rafi, Lata Mangeshkar	Hasrat Jaipuri
6	"Ye Kaisa Maine Madhur Si"	Mohammed Rafi	Rajinder Krishan

== Reception ==
Vijay Lokapally of The Hindu said the film, "had its bright moments in the presence of Dharmendra and Vinod Khanna, two evergreen stars of Indian cinema."
