= Rakhi Aur Rifle =

- Directed by: Radhakant
- Starring: Dara Singh; Leela Mishra
- Music by: Sapan-Jagmohan
- Release date: 1976
- Language: Hindi

Rakhi Aur Rifle is a 1976 Hindi action film.

== Songs ==
1. "Ek Musibat Khadi Ho Gayi" – Usha Mangeshkar
2. "Hansi Meri Le Lo Khushi Meri Le Lo" – Aziz Nazan
3. "'Kabhi Kabhi Saiyya Sharab Pike Aaye" – Asha Bhosle
4. "Tum Pyare Ho Balam Mohe Praan Se" – Asha Bhosle
5. "Ye Rakhi Bhi Pyari Hai" – Asha Bhosle
