= Chinnamul =

- A scene from the film Chinnamul
- Directed by: Nemai Ghosh
- Story by: Swarnakamal Bhattacharya
- Produced by: Bimal Dey
- Starring: Gangapada Basu; Bijon Bhattacharya; Ritwik Ghatak; Shobha Sen
- Cinematography: Nemai Ghosh
- Edited by: Gobardhan Adhikari
- Music by: Kalabran Das
- Production company: Desa Pictures
- Distributed by: Union Distributors
- Release date: 1950
- Running time: 117 minutes
- Country: India
- Language: Bengali

Chinnamul (alternate spelling Chhinnamul, lit. The Uprooted) was a 1950 Bengali film directed by Nemai Ghosh. This was the first Indian film that dealt with the partition of India. The story revolved around a group of farmers from East Pakistan (now Bangladesh) who were forced to migrate to Calcutta because of the partition of Bengal in 1947. Russian film director Vsevolod Pudovkin came to Calcutta at that time, watched this film, and being inspired, he bought the print of this film to release in Russia. The film was shown in 188 theaters in Russia.

== Plot ==
The film is based on the story of Swarnakamal Bhattacharya. Depicting the physical pain and crisis, the film is about the partition of Bengal and the flow of refugees from East Pakistan (present Bangladesh) into India's West Bengal. The story begins in a village of East Bengal where people (Hindus and Muslims) live peacefully. Govinda and Sumati are husband and wife who are about to have a child. However, the partition forces Hindu people to leave their ancestral village. So, they become refugees. They don't find any location or shelter in Calcutta and eke out their daily lives in temporary shelters in and around Sealdah railway station. Along with millions of refugees the family has to face untold misery in big city.

== Cast and crew ==
=== Cast ===
- Gangapada Basu
- Bijon Bhattacharya
- Jalad Chatterjee
- Shanta Devi
- Ritwik Ghatak
- Shanti Mitra
- Prematosh Roy
- Shobha Sen
- Sushil Sen.

=== Crew ===
- Direction and cinematography: Nemai Ghosh.
- Writer: Swarnakamal Bhattacharya.
- Music: Kalabran Das

== See also ==
- Pather Panchali, 1955 film directed by Satyajit Ray
