= Shobha Sen =

Bengali theatre and film actress (1923–2017)

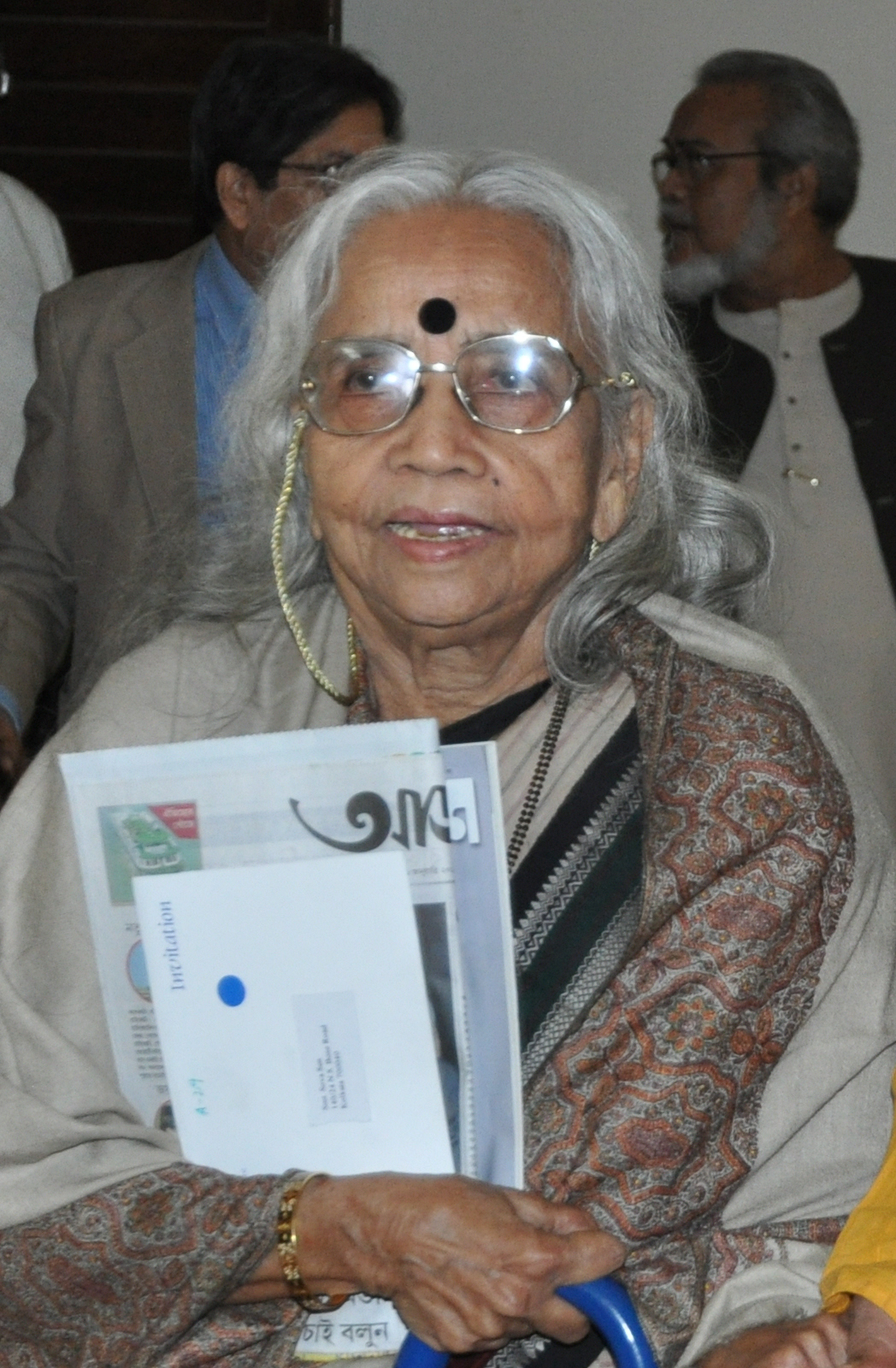
- Sen in 2010
- Born: 17 September 1923; Faridpur, Bengal, British India
- Died: 13 August 2017 (aged 93); Kolkata, West Bengal, India
- Occupation: Actress
- Spouse: Utpal Dutt (m. 1960; died 1993)

Shobha Sen (17 September 1923 – 13 August 2017), also known as Sova Sen, was an Indian actress who worked in Bengali theatre and Bengali cinema.

== Career ==
After graduating from Bethune College, she joined Gananatya Sangstha and acted in the lead female role of Nabanna. She joined the Little Theatre Group in 1953-54, which later became the People's Theatre Group. She subsequently acted in many productions of the group, chief among them are: Barricade, Tiner Taloyar and Titumir. She has also worked in some films, including Ek Adhuri Kahani.

On 10 April 2010, Sen received the Mother Teresa International Award.

== Personal life ==
Shobha Sen married two times, and had one child by each marriage. Her first husband, Deba Prasad Sen, was a freedom fighter. They had one son, Udayan Sen, before the marriage ended in divorce. In 1960, she married actor and theatre personality Utpal Dutt, who was six years younger than her. Shobha and Utpal Dutt have one daughter, Dr. Bishnupriya Dutt, who is a professor of theatre history in the School of Arts and Aesthetics at Jawaharlal Nehru University, New Delhi.

== Works ==
=== Plays ===
- Nabanna (1944)
- Barricade
- Tiner Taloyar
- Titumir
- Kallol
- Angar

=== Films ===
- Kankantala Light Railway (1950)
- Bhagavan Sri Ramakrishna, 1955 film by Prafulla Chakraborty
- Adarsha Hindu Hotel, 1957 film
- Khokababur Pratyabartan, 1960 film by Agradoot
- Bedeni, unfinished film of Ritwik Ghatak
- Ichhapuran, 1970 film directed by Mrinal Sen
- Ek Adhuri Kahani, 1972 film directed by Mrinal Sen
- Jharh, 1979 film directed by Utpal Dutt
- Thagini 1974 film directed by Tarun Majumdar
- Ek Din Pratidin, 1979 film directed by Mrinal Sen
- Baisakhi Megh, 1981 film directed by Utpal Dutt
- Paka Dekha, 1980 film directed by Arabinda Mukherjee
- Pasand Apni Apni, 1983 Hindi film directed by Basu Chatterjee
- Dekha, 2001 film directed by Gautam Ghose
- Shadows of Time, 2004 German film in Bengali directed by Florian Gallenberger
- Abohomaan, 2010 film directed by Rituporno Ghosh
