= Ritwik Ghatak =

Indian Bengali filmmaker and script writer (1925–1976)

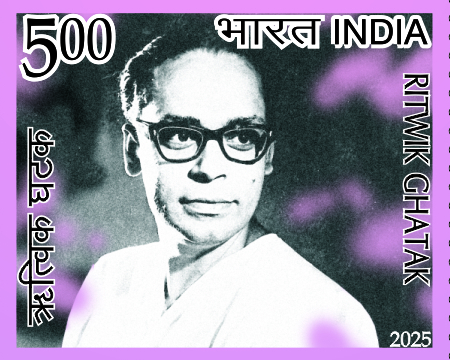
- Ghatak on a 2025 stamp of India
- Pronunciation: [rit̪ːik ɡʱɔʈok]
- Born: 4 November 1925; Zindabahar Lane, Dhaka, Bengal Presidency, British India (modern day Dhaka, Bangladesh)
- Died: 6 February 1976 (aged 50); Calcutta, West Bengal, India
- Education: Ballygunge Government High School; Rajshahi Collegiate School; Presidency University; University of Calcutta; Murshidabad Maharaja Krishnanath University
- Occupations: Director; writer
- Years active: 1952–1976
- Works: Filmography; Bibliography; Theatrical works
- Spouse: Surama Ghatak
- Children: 3
- Relatives: Aroma Dutta (niece); Manish Ghatak (brother); Mahasweta Devi (niece); Parambrata Chatterjee (grandnephew); Nabarun Bhattacharya (brother's grandson); Bijon Bhattacharya (niece's spouse)
- Awards: Padma Shri (1970); National Film Award for Best Story (1974)

Ritwik Kumar Ghatak (Note: Bengali: [rit̪ːik ɡʱɔʈok].) (Bengali: [rit̪ːik ɡʱɔʈok]; 4 November 1925 – 6 February 1976) was an Indian film director, screenwriter, actor and playwright. Widely considered as one of the greatest film makers of all time, his works remained largely underrated and ignored during his lifetime. Along with prominent contemporary Bengali filmmakers like Satyajit Ray, Tapan Sinha and Mrinal Sen, his cinema is primarily remembered for its meticulous depiction of social reality, partition and feminism. He won the National Film Award's Rajat Kamal Award for Best Story in 1974 for his Jukti Takko Aar Gappo and Best Director's Award from Bangladesh Cine Journalist's Association for Titash Ekti Nadir Naam. The Government of India honoured him with the Padma Shri for Arts in 1970.

== Family ==
Ritaban Ghatak, his son, is also a filmmaker and is involved in the Ritwik Memorial Trust. He has restored Ritwik's Bagalar Banga Darshan, Ronger Golam and completed his unfinished documentary on Ramkinkar.

Ritaban has made a film titled Unfinished Ritwik. He is working on adapting Bibhutibhushan Bandopadhyay's novel Ichhamati. Ghatak's elder daughter, Samhita, made a docufeature titled Nobo Nagarik. Ghatak's younger daughter died in 2009.

== Creative career ==
In 1948, Ghatak wrote his first play, Kalo sayar (The Dark Lake), and participated in a revival of the landmark play Nabanna. Ghatak, who was a member of the Communist Party of India till he was expelled in 1955, was one of the main leaders behind the party's cultural wing, the Indian People's Theatre Association. He was renowned for his partition trilogy Meghe Dhaka Tara (The Cloud-capped Star), 1960; Komal Gandhar (E Flat), 1961; and Subarnarekha (The Golden Thread), 1962.

Ghatak entered the film industry with Nimai Ghosh's Chinnamul (1950) as an actor and assistant director. Chinnamul was followed in two years by Ghatak's first completed film, Nagarik (1952), both major breakthroughs for Indian cinema. Ghatak's early work sought theatrical and literary precedent in bringing together a documentary realism, a stylised performance often drawn from the folk theatre, and a Brechtian use of the filmic apparatus.

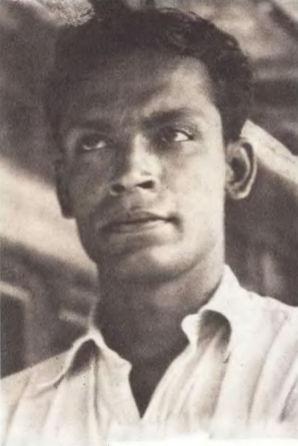
Ritwik Ghatak, at a young age

Ghatak moved briefly to Pune in 1966, where he taught at the Film and Television Institute of India (FTII). His students included filmmakers Mani Kaul, Kumar Shahani, Adoor Gopalkrishnan, Saeed Akhtar Mirza, John Abraham. During his year at FTII, he was involved in the making of two student films: Fear and Rendezvous.

== Impact and influence ==
A scene from Ghatak's last film, Jukti Takko Aar Gappo (1974)

Ghatak died on 6 February 1976. At the time of his death, Ghatak's primary influence seemed to have been through former students. Although his stint teaching film at FTII was brief, one-time students Mani Kaul, John Abraham, and especially Kumar Shahani, carried Ghatak's ideas and theories, which were elaborated upon in his book Cinema and I, into the mainstream of Indian art film. Cinema and I was called by Satyajit Ray as a book that covers all aspects of filmmaking. Other students of his at the FTII included Saeed Akhtar Mirza, Subhash Ghai and Adoor Gopalakrishnan. While other filmmakers like Satyajit Ray succeeded in creating an audience outside India during their lifetime, Ghatak and his films were appreciated primarily within India. Satyajit Ray did what he could to promote his colleague, but Ray's generous praise did not translate into international fame for Ghatak. For example, Ghatak's Nagarik (1952) was perhaps the earliest example of a Bengali art film, preceding Ray's Pather Panchali by three years, but was not released until after his death in 1977. His first commercial release, Ajantrik (1955), was one of the early Indian films to portray an inanimate object, an automobile, as a character in the story, many years before the Herbie films. Ghatak's Bari Theke Paliye (1958) had a similar plot to François Truffaut's The 400 Blows (1959), but Ghatak's film remained obscure while Truffaut's went on to become one of the more famous of the French New Wave. One of Ghatak's later films, Titash Ekti Nadir Naam (1973), is one of the early to be told in a hyperlink format, featuring multiple characters in a collection of interconnected stories, predating Robert Altman's Nashville (1975) by two years.

Ghatak's only major commercial success was Madhumati (1958), a Hindi film, which he wrote the screenplay for. It was one of the early ones to deal with the theme of reincarnation and is believed to have been the source of inspiration for many later works dealing with reincarnation in Indian cinema, Indian television, and perhaps world cinema. It may have been the source of inspiration for the American film The Reincarnation of Peter Proud (1975) and the Hindi film Karz (1980), both of which dealt with reincarnation and have been influential in their respective cultures. Karz in particular was remade several times: as the Kannada film Yuga Purusha (1989), the Tamil film Enakkul Oruvan (1984), and more recently the Bollywood Karzzzz (2008). Karz and The Reincarnation of Peter Proud may have inspired the American Chances Are (1989). The most recent film to be directly inspired by Madhumati was the hit Bollywood film Om Shanti Om (2007), which led to the late Bimal Roy's daughter Rinki Bhattacharya accusing it of plagiarism and threatening legal action against its producers.

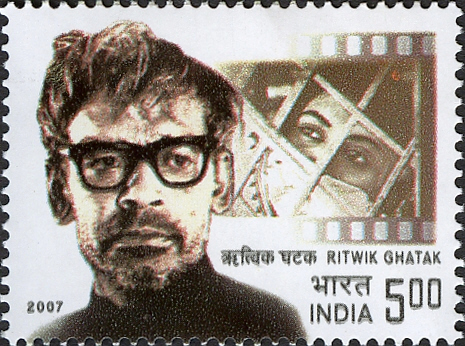
Ghatak in a 2007 stamp of India.

Ghatak's work as a director influenced many later Indian filmmakers, including those from the Bengali film industry and elsewhere. Ghatak is said to have influences on Kumar Shahani, Mani Kaul, Ketan Mehta, and Adoor Gopalakrishnan. For example, Mira Nair has cited Ghatak as well as Ray as the reasons she became a filmmaker. Ghatak's influence as a director began to spread beyond India much later; beginning in the 1990s, a project to restore Ghatak's films was undertaken, and international exhibitions (and subsequent DVD releases) have belatedly generated an increasingly global audience. In a critics' poll of all-time greatest films conducted by the Asian film magazine Cinemaya in 1998, Subarnarekha was ranked at No. 11. In the 2002 Sight & Sound critics' and directors' poll for all-time greatest films, Meghe Dhaka Tara was ranked at No. 231 and Komal Gandhar at No. 346. In 2007, A River Named Titas topped the list of 10 best Bangladeshi films, as chosen in the audience and critics' polls conducted by the British Film Institute. Russia-born German actress Elena Kazan once said Ghatak's Jukti Takko Gappo has the most profound influence on her view about world cinema.

== Ideology ==
A devoted communist throughout his life, Ghatak was a theorist as well. His views and commentaries on films have been parts of scholarly studies and research. As a filmmaker, his main concentration was on men and life, especially the day-to-day struggle of ordinary people. He could never accept the partition of Bengal in 1947, which divided Bengal and created a new country. In almost all his films, he dealt with this theme.

For him, filmmaking was an art form and a means to end the suffering of people. It was a means of expressing his anger at the sorrows and sufferings of his people.

== Filmography and accolades ==
- Padma Shri for Arts in 1970 by The government of India.
- Musafir had won the Certificate of Merit for Third Best Feature Film at the 5th National Film Awards in 1957.
- Madhumati Nominated for Filmfare Best Story Award.
- The National Film Award's Rajat Kamal Award for Best Story in 1974 for Jukti Takko Aar Gappo.
- Certificate of Merit for the Second Best Feature Film in Bengali for Subarnarekha at the 13th National Film Awards
- Heerer Prajapati had won the Best Children's Film Award (Prime Minister's gold medal) at the 16th National Film Awards in 1970.

=== Honours ===
The 56th International Film Festival of India taking place from 20 to 28 November 2025, will celebrate centenary and pay tribute to Ritwik Ghatak by screening his classic films.

== See also ==
- Mrinal Sen
- Rajen Tarafdar
- Goutam Ghose

== See also ==
- Goutam Ghose
