= Meghe Dhaka Tara =

Meghe Dhaka Tara (lit. 'Star Hidden by the Clouds' in Bengali) may refer to these in Indian arts:

- Meghe Dhaka Tara (1960 film), a film directed by Ritwik Ghatak
- Meghe Dhaka Tara (2013 film), a film directed by Kamaleshwar Mukherjee
- Meghe Dhaka Tara (play), a 2016 play directed by Bratya Basu
