= Bhola Moira =

Bengali poet

Bhola Moira was a renowned Bengali witty Kabiyal. He was one of the most prominent figures in the world of Kavigan.

== Early life ==
Bhola Moira's real name was Bholanath Modak. His year of birth remains unknown. It is popularly believed that he was born in Guptipara in the Hooghly district. His father was named Kripanath. He owned a sweet shop in the Bagbazar area of Kolkata. Although he received little formal education in childhood, he possessed knowledge of Sanskrit, Persian, and Hindi. He had studied the Puranas and religious scriptures to a limited extent. He composed many poems before forming his own troupe.

== Poetic fame ==
Bhola Moira was capable of composing extempore poetry. His poems were satirical and pointed out social defects. He possessed the ability to mesmerize the audience through his presence of mind, witty and aggressive rhetoric, a mix of grave and light subjects, and popular humor. Ishwar Chandra Vidyasagar stated, "To keep Bengali society alive, the emergence of orators like Ramgopal Ghosh, writers like Hutum Pyancha, and Kabiyals like Bhola Moira is essential." Bhola Moira described himself as a disciple of the famous Kabiyal Haru Thakur. Haru Thakur also composed songs for him. His rivals included Anthony Firingee, Ram Basu, and Yajnaheshwari Dasi. Nobin Chandra Das, the inventor of Rasgulla, was his son-in-law.

== Film ==
A film titled Bhola Moira (film), directed by Piyush Ganguly, was released in 1977 based on the life of Bhola Moira. Actors such as Uttam Kumar, Supriya Devi, and Bikash Roy starred in this film. Additionally, actor Asit Baran played the character in the film Antony Firingee and Kharaj Mukherjee played the role of Bhola Moira in the film Jaatishwar.
