= Komal Gandhar =

Komal Gandhar (A Soft Note on a Sharp Scale)
- Poster
- Directed by: Ritwik Ghatak
- Screenplay by: Ritwik Ghatak
- Produced by: Ritwik Ghatak
- Cinematography: Dilip Ranjan Mukhopadhyay
- Edited by: Ramesh Joshi
- Music by: Jyotirindra Moitra; Lyrics: Rabindranath Tagore
- Release date: 31 March 1961
- Country: India
- Language: Bengali

Komal Gandhar (Bengali: কোমল গান্ধার Kōmal Gāndhār), also known as A Soft Note on a Sharp Scale, is a 1961 Bengali film written and directed by legendary film maker Ritwik Ghatak. The title refers to the Hindustani equivalent of "E-flat". It was part of the trilogy composed of Meghe Dhaka Tara (1960), Komal Gandhar and Subarnarekha (1962), all dealing with the aftermath of the Partition of India in 1947 and the refugees coping with it, though this was the most optimistic film of his oeuvre. The film explores three themes juxtaposed in the narrative: the dilemma of Anusuya, the lead character, the divided leadership of IPTA, and the fallout from the partition of India.

== Overview ==
The film title was taken from the line of a poem (Note: Book: Punascha, poem: Komal–Gandhar; Bengali: নাম রেখেছি কোমল গান্ধার, মনে মনে।) by Rabindranath Tagore that meant a sur or note, E-flat. As in other films by Ghatak, music plays a pivotal role in the movie.

Through the microcosmic perspectivising of a group of devoted and uncompromising IPTA workers, Ghatak with his signature style touches on varied issues of partition, idealism, corruption, the interdependence of art and life, the scope of art, and class-struggle. Unlike his other films, this one runs along an upbeat mood with the lead pair of lovers (Vrigu and Anusua) being reunited.

== Cast ==
- Supriya Devi as Anusuya
- Abanish Bannerjee as Bhrigu
- Bijon Bhattacharya as Gagan
- Satindra Bhattacharya as Shibnath
- Debabrata Biswas
- Chitra Sen as Jaya
- Anil Chatterjee as Rishi
- Gyanesh Mukherjee
- Satyabrata Chattopadhyay
- Gita Dey as Shanta

== Soundtrack ==
Music was by Jyotirindra Moitra, from IPTA, and a noted Rabindra Sangeet exponent who had previously given music in Ghatak's Meghe Dhaka Tara (1960), and had song by singers like, Bijon Bhattacharya, Debabrata Biswas, Hemanga Biswas. Bahadur Khan played sarod in the soundtrack. The film is noted for its wedding songs and also contrapuntal use of sound.

== Screening of Komal Gandhar aka E-Flat in different festivals ==
- 2017: Ritwik Ghatak Retrospective UK, at Dundee Contemporary Arts, Dundee, Scotland, UK, Programme curated by Sanghita Sen, Department of Film Studies, St Andrews University, UK

== See also ==
- List of works of Ritwik Ghatak
