= Meghe Dhaka Tara (play) =

2016 Bengali drama directed by Bratya Basu

Meghe Dhaka Tara is a 2016 drama directed by Bratya Basu and produced and staged by Naihati Bratyajan. The plot of the drama is based on Ritwik Ghatak's 1960 film Meghe Dhaka Tara.

== Credits ==
=== Cast ===
- Poulomi Basu as Neeta
- Subhashish Mukhopadhyay as Tarini Master
- Partha Bhowmick as Shankar
- Suranjana Dasgupta as Kathakali
- Anirban Ghosh as Sanatan

=== Crew ===
- Bratya Basu - director
- Ujjawal Chattopadhyay - writer

== Production ==
The rehearsal of the drama started in 2016. In August 2015, Bratya Basu informed about this drama in a press conference. He also informed that at that time he was working on two other dramas.

=== Casting ===
Poulomi Basu played Neeta's role. In Ghatak's film the character was portrayed by Supriya Devi. Subhashish Mukhopadhyay played Tarini Master, Neeta's father role. In Ghatak's movie Bijon Bhattacharya played this character. Partha Bhowmick portrayed Shankar's character, which was played by Anil Chatterjee in the movie. Suranjana Dasgupta and Anirban Ghosh played the roles of Kathakali and Sanatan.

== Release ==
The drama was first staged on 2 January 2016 at University Institute Hall, Kolkata. As of 3 January 2016, the drama will be staged every Saturday at that auditorium.
