= Meghna Kothari =

Indian actress

Meghna Kothari is an Indian actress. She has acted in Bollywood movies and in Gurinder Chadha's film Bride and Prejudice where she played the role of Maya Bakshi based on the character Mary Bennett and is known for the famous cobra dance choreographed by Saroj Khan. She learned Kathak dance under the tutelage of Reba Vidyarthi and the peerless Birju Maharaj at the National Institute of Kathak Dance.

She started her acting career with a cameo in Aahat (TV series) (produced by B. P. Singh) along with theatre director Satyadev Dubey. Her debut film was Prem Aggan with Fardeen Khan.

In theater, she took training at Living Theatre and has acted in plays directed by the legendary Ebrahim Alkazi.

She is the daughter of Rita Ganguly and Keshav Kothari, who was the secretary of Sangeet Natak Akademi. Her brother is poet Arijeet. Actress Gita Ghatak is her maternal aunt and renowned folklorist Komal Kothari is her paternal uncle. She is married to Sandeep Chattopadhyay (Chatterjee) a director, who received the National Film Award for Best Short Fiction Film at the 50th National Film Awards for the film Sunder Jibon and the lead actor in the film Chitrasutram directed by Vipin Vijay.

She returned to limelight after comedians Biswa Kalyan Rath and Kanan Gill made a sketch (Pretentious Movie Reviews) about the film Prem Aggan. She, along with Hansal Mehta, featured in the music video of the song 'Likh Ke Mehndi Se Sajna Ka Naam' sung by Anuradha Paudwal. She keeps herself busy organizing short filmmaking workshops via the collective 'Ctrl Alt Cinema'.

== Filmography ==
Filmography
Year	Title
1998	Prem Aggan
2000	Hari Bhari
2002	Vadh
2005	Bride and Prejudice
2004	Sau Jhooth Ek Sach
