= Begaana =

Begaana (lit. 'Stranger') may refer to these Indian films:

- Begaana (1963 film), a Hindi romantic drama film
- Begaana (1986 film), a Bollywood film
