= Hemanga Biswas =

Indian singer, composer, author and political activist

- হেমাঙ্গ বিশ্বাস
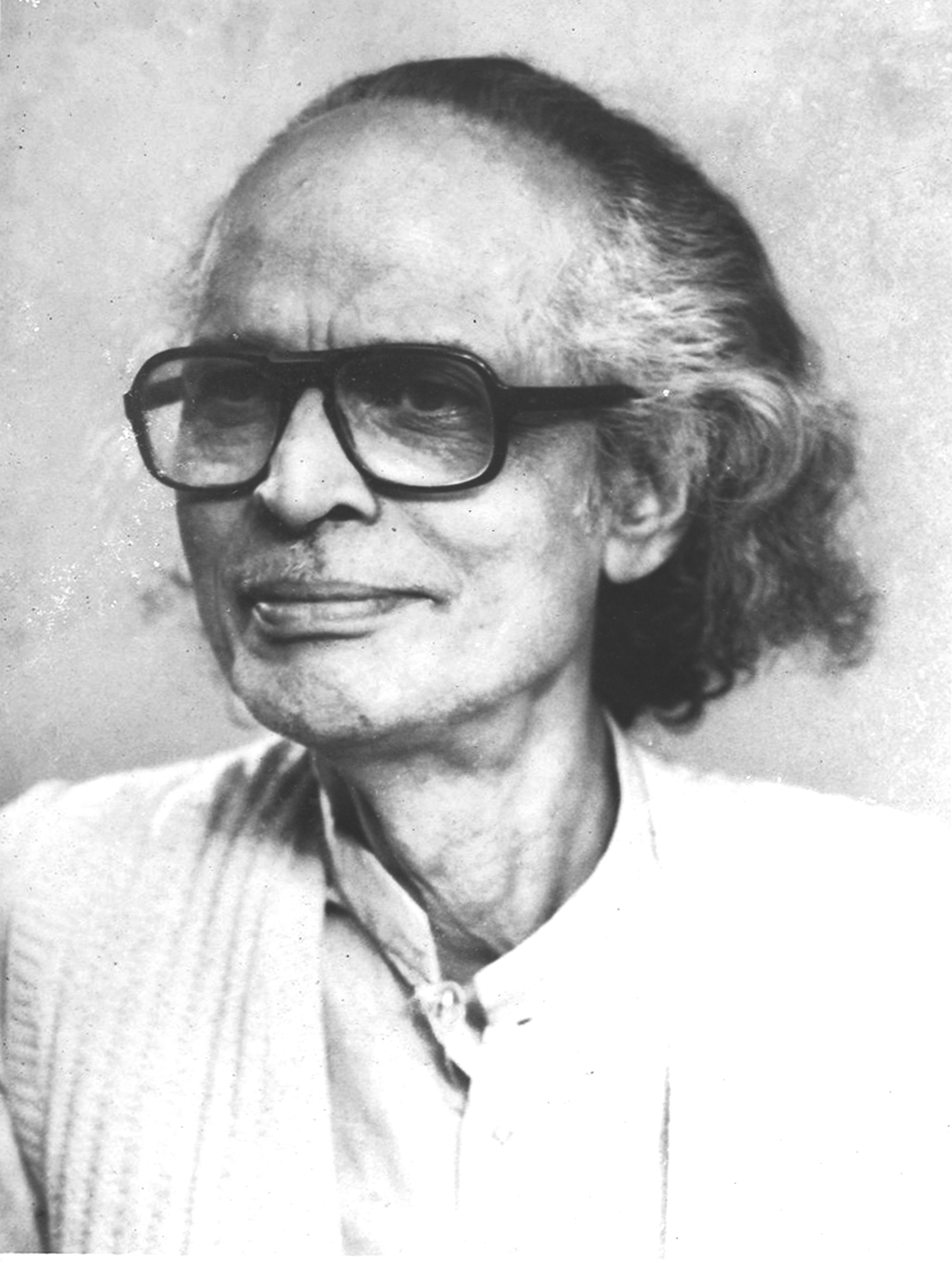
- Biswas in the 1980s
- Pronunciation: [hemaŋɡo biʃːaʃ]
- Born: 14 December 1912; Mirashi, Habiganj, Sylhet, Assam Province, British India (now Bangladesh)
- Died: 22 November 1987 (aged 74); Calcutta, West Bengal, India
- Citizenship: British Indian (1912–1947); Indian (1947–1987)
- Occupations: Singer; songwriter; composer; author; theatre artist; political activist
- Years active: 1930–1978
- Works: Discography; bibliography
- Political party: Indian People's Theatre Association
- Movement: Indian independence movement
- Criminal charges: Anti-British activism
- Criminal penalty: Imprisonments
- Spouse: Ranu Dutta (m. 1959; died 1987)
- Writing career
- Language: Bengali; Assamese
- Period: Modern
- Genres: non-fiction; scholarly publishing; essay; poem; song
- Subjects: Revolution; freedom; humanism; communism; justice
- Notable works: Shônkhôchiler Gan; Hemanga Biswaser Gan; Kul Khurar Sûtal; Akôu Sin Sai Ahilû̃; Ôxôm Aru Bôngôr Lûkôxôngit Xômikkhya
- Musical career
- Genres: Gana Sangeet; folk; revolutionary; Bhawaiya; Bhatiali; Bahirana
- Instruments: Vocals; harmonium
- Works: Full list
- Formerly of: Mass Singers

Hemanga Biswas (Note: Bengali/Assamese: হেমাঙ্গ বিশ্বাস, Bengali pronunciation: [hemaŋɡo biʃːaʃ], Assamese pronunciation: [ɦɛmaŋɡɔ bisːax].) (Bengali/Assamese: হেমাঙ্গ বিশ্বাস, pronounced [hemaŋɡo biʃːaʃ]; 14 December 1912 – 22 November 1987) was an Indian singer, composer, author and political activist, known for his literature in Bengali and Assamese, advocacy of peoples music, drawing from genres of folk music, including Bhatiali originally popular among the fishermen of Bengal.

== Early life ==
Biswas was born in a Bengali Hindu family of Habiganj, Sylhet, British India (now in Bangladesh) on 14 December 1912 to Harakumar and Sarojini Biswas. He went to the Middle English School in Habiganj. He studied at the George Institution of Dibrugarh from 1925 to 1927 when Nilmoni Phukan was its headmaster. There he became interested in Assamese culture. He attended Habiganj Government High School in 1930. He also studied in MC College, Sylhet from 1930 to 1931. Biswas embraced the values of communism during his college years and wrote poems and plays on equal rights. During this time he started performing "gana sangeet." He did not complete his formal education. Biswas became involved in a movement to ensure the rights of tea garden laborers, farmers, and the underprivileged throughout the region. For his political convictions, he was arrested in 1930. He was also associated with the Indian People's Theatre Association. He married Ranu Dutta, a high school teacher, in 1959. Their son, Moinak Biswas (professor of Film Studies at Jadavpur University & filmmaker), was born in 1960 and their daughter, Rongili Biswas (a writer & professor of Economics) was born in 1967.

== Musical work ==
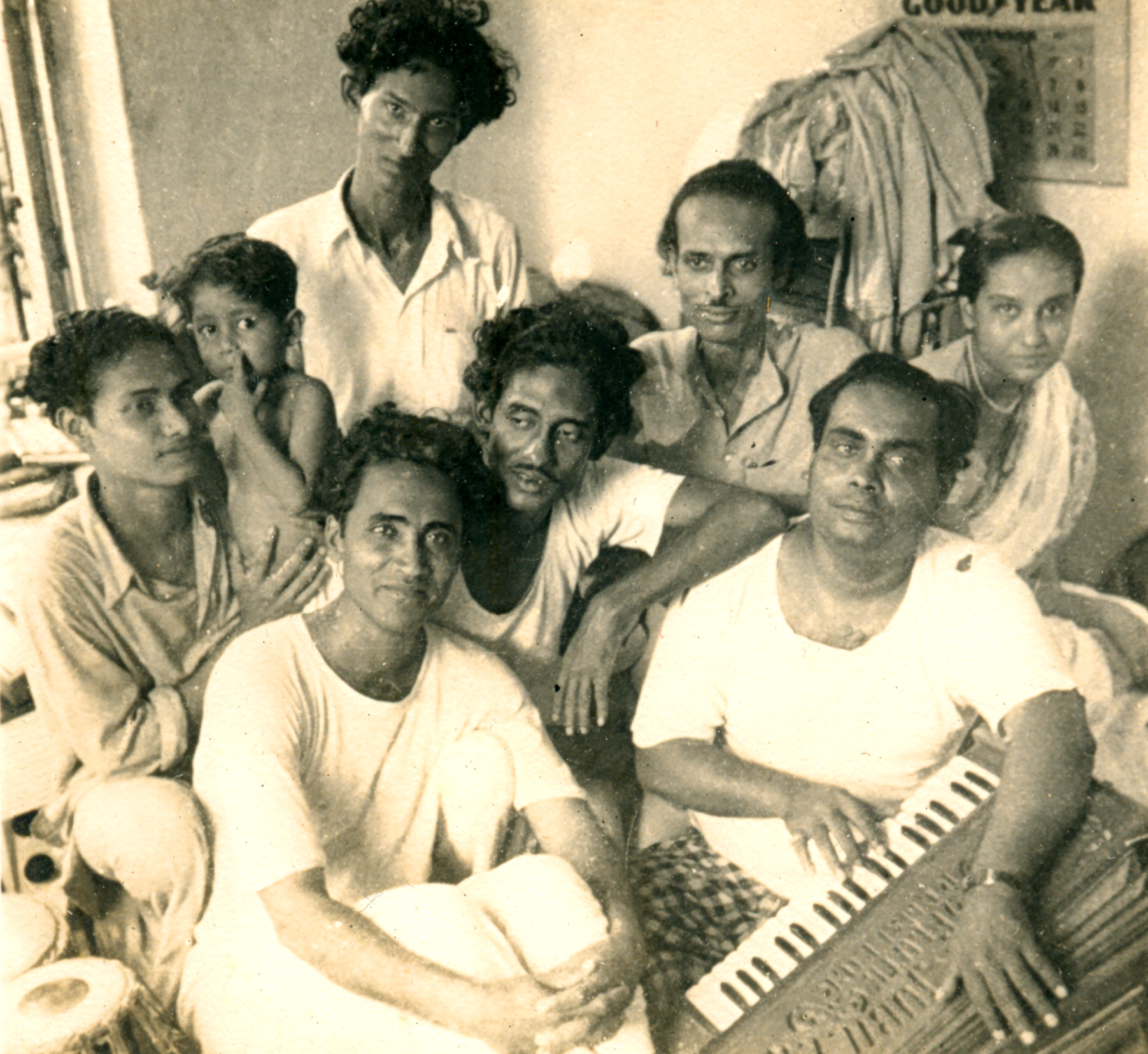
Hemanga with Debabrata Biswas, Omar Sheikh, Niranjan Sen and others.

Hemanga Biswas was responsible for a number of popular Bengali songs. A fierce debate once ensued between Salil Choudhury and him on the method of translating the ideal of people's art:

He sang a duet with Bhupen Hazarika, Debabrata Biswas and Pete Seeger. Through his music, he had hoped to motivate the masses to fight for their rights, for them to be united, and for them to be vocal against any form of corruption. His beliefs in equal rights for all led him to repeatedly try to request and urge the then Congress Government headed by Siddhartha Shankar Roy to extend a helping hand to the labour class people. Banchbo Re Banchbo Amra was composed to motivate the laborers to improve their standard of living. His translation of The Internationale into Bengali and his singing of such songs as Amra Karbo Joy, Ajadi Hoyni Tor, and Negro Bhai Amar (which refers to Paul Robeson) aided the Bengali leftist movement.

He was influenced by Bhawaiya and Bhatiali, and generated his own style, which combined those folk traditions with Sylhet culture's, which he called Bahirana. He formed Mass Singers (a group for mass songs) in or around 1978.

== Movies ==
Hemanga Biswas was the playback singer in Meghe Dhaka Tara (The Cloud Capped Star) (1960), Lalon Fakir (Deha Tari Dilam Chhariyo), Utpal Datta's Kallol, and Komal Gandhar.

== Discography ==
1. Bhedi Anôshôn Mṛityu
2. Rush Desher Komred Lenin
3. Pub Dik Lal
4. Aro Bôsôntô Bahu Bôsôntô Tômar Name Asuk
5. Ei Sômadhitale
6. Jhanjha Jhor Mṛityu
7. John Brown-er Deho Shuye
8. Amra Kôrbô Joy
9. Tôgbôg Dhabôman Ashwakhure
10. Kôllol
11. Langar Chhariya Naô-er De Dukhhi Naiya
12. Karagar Bôndi
13. Dhire Bahe Yangsi
14. Sagarjatra Nabik Nirbhôy
15. Shankhachil
16. Phulguli Kôthay Gel
17. Bharatêr Himalayer Ek Shishu Debdaru
18. Mahanagarir Rajpathe Jôto Rôkter Swakshar
19. Ami Je Dekhechi Sei Desh
20. Jalinabager Jallalabader
21. Amra To Bhuli Nai Shahid
22. Nigrô Bhai Amar Paul Robeson
23. John Henry
24. Mountbatten Mangal Kabya
25. Behular Bhelay
26. Bangla Bannyay
27. Ami Jai Shaoshan
28. Bachbô Bachbôre
29. Bhanga Banglar Tar-Chhera Baul
30. Azadi Hoy Ni Ajo Tor
31. Chiner Ekti Lôkgiti
32. Tôr Môrágange Ailo Ebar Ban
33. Dhakar Dak
34. Habiganjer Jalali Kôitor
35. Tôra Bôl Sakhi Bôl
36. Padma Kao, Kao Amare
37. Môn Kandere Padmar Chorer Laigya
38. Lal Lônthon Natoker Gan
39. Gulibiddho Gan Je Amar
40. Egiye Chôlô Muktisena
41. E Matir Ei Dhulikonay
42. Amar Gayer Shirnô Nodi
43. Mukti Shibire Hanke Biugôl
44. Tôra Je Matrimukti-Mantra
45. Amra Juger Swapnô Ôre
46. Kastetare Dio Jore Shan
47. Udaypôther Jatri
48. Ghor Tamas Bhedi
49. Praner Bôdôle Chai Prôtidan
50. Milito Praner Ruddho Deule
51. Tabu Mṛityu Eseche Bôrabhôy
52. Ajab Desher Ajab Lila
53. Telengana Telengana
54. Haradhan-Rangmôn Kôtha
55. Prôtidhwani Shuni
56. Thakile Dôbakhana Hôbe Kôchuripana
57. Ora Amader Gan Gaite Dey Na
58. Phiraiya De De Moder Bandhukere
59. Dheu Utheche Kara Tutche
60. Bir Pradhan O, Bir Pradhan O
61. Dure Dure Bônmajhe Sari Sari Gramer
62. Lal Dhan Akha Re
63. Murkho Gidal Hamragula Bhaoaiya Gan Gai
64. Shatakul Bikôshitô Hôk
65. Hushiyar
66. Komred Shôn Biugôle Ei Hankiche Re
67. Antôrjatik

== Bibliography ==
=== Bengali ===
1. Bishan (বিষাণ, 1943)
2. Shimantô Prôhôri (সীমান্ত প্রহরী, 1961)
3. Shônkhôchiler Gan (শঙ্খচিলের গান, 1975)
4. Amar Gan (আমার গান)
5. Abar Chin Dekhe Elam (আবার চীন দেখে এলাম, 1975)
6. Chin Theke Phire (চীন থেকে ফিরে, 1977)
7. Lokôshôngit Shômikkha: Bangla O Assam (লোকসংগীত সমীক্ষা: বাংলা ও আসাম, 1978)
8. Hemanga Biswaser Gan (হেমাঙ্গ বিশ্বাসের গান, 1980)
9. Ujan Gang Baiya (উজান গাঙ বাইয়া, 1990)
10. Ganer Bahirana (গানের বাহিরানা, 1998)
11. Hemanga Biswas Rôchônashôngrôhô 1 (হেমাঙ্গ বিশ্বাস রচনাসংগ্রহ ১, 2012)

=== Assamese ===
1. Kul Khurar Sûtal (কুল খুৰাৰ চোতাল, 1985)
2. Akôu Sin Sai Ahilû̃ Volume I (আকৌ চীন চাই আহিলোঁ ১ম খণ্ড, 1975)
3. Akôu Sin Sai Ahilû̃ Volume II (আকৌ চীন চাই আহিলোঁ ২য় খণ্ড, 1977)
4. Jiwônxilpi Jyotiprasad (জীৱনশিল্পী জ্যোতিপ্ৰসাদ, 1983)
5. Ôxôm Aru Bôngôr Lûkô-Xôngit Xômikkhya (অসম আৰু বঙ্গৰ লোক-সঙ্গীত সমীক্ষা)
6. Hemanga Biswas Rôsônawôli (হেমাঙ্গ বিশ্বাস ৰচনাৱলী, 2008)

== See also ==
- Left Front
- The Internationale
