= Gita Dey =

Indian actress (1931-2011)

- Born: 5 August 1931; Kolkata, West Bengal, India
- Died: 17 January 2011 (aged 79); Kolkata, West Bengal, India
- Other name: Gita maa
- Occupation: Actress
- Years active: 1938–2008
- Children: 3

Gita Dey (Bengali: গীতা দে, 5 August 1931 – 17 January 2011) was an Indian actress in Bengali cinema, theatre and Bengali folk theater. She became a stage artist at the age of 6 years. She came to the film industry in 1943. Her first film release was Ahuti (1941) as a child actress. She acted in over 200 Bengali-language films and over 2,000 stage shows. She acted in the movie Teen Kanya by Satyajit Ray and Rittik Ghatak's Meghe Dhaka Tara, Subarnarekha, Komal Gandhar, and Kato Ajanare. She also acted in Hindi movies such as Parineeta (2005) with Vidya Balan and Sanjay Dutt and other movies. She was associated with All India Radio for a long time doing Shruti Natok. She received the Presidential Award for Lifetime Achievement from Dr. A.P.J. Abdul Kalam and many other awards during her lifetime.

== Early life ==
She started as an actress in the Bengali film industry based in Kolkata's Tollygunge since 1938. Her first role was as a child artiste when she was six years old in Ahutee directed by Dhiren Ganguly.

== Later career ==
She has been associated with All India Radio since 1954, and enacted character roles in radio plays. However, her last play was Badsahi Chaal (1996), which was directed by Ganesh Mukherjee, and was staged at the Rangana theatre in North Kolkata.

She acted diverse roles in a wide variety of films, and is known for her versatile outlook in her many roles. Her acting even caught the attention of the legendary Laurence Olivier.

Proficient in both negative and comic roles, Dey was brilliant in the role of torn and scheming mother in Ritwik Ghatak's Meghe Dhaka Tara.

Throughout her long career, she worked with directors like Sisir Bhaduri, Ritwik Ghatak, Debaki Bose and Satyajit Ray. She also acted in a Bollywood musical based on Sarat Chandra Chattopadhyay's Parineeta, starring Saif Ali Khan and Vidya Balan.

Though ailing, she went on acting and won applause in recent films like Tolly Lights and Chirodini Tumi Je Amar.

Dey died on 17 January 2011 in Kolkata, aged 79.

== Filmography ==
- Meghe Dhaka Tara (1960)
- Teen Kanya (1961)
- Dampati
- Indrani (1958)
- Nauka Dubi
- Malyadan (1971)
- Komol Gandher (1961)
- Abhaya o Srikanta
- Dainee (1961)
- Kathin Maya (1961)
- Kanchanmulya (1961)
- Sathi Hara (1961)
- Kancher Swarga (1962)
- Shubba Drishti (1962)
- Bandhan (1962)
- Saat Paake Bandha (1963)
- Dui Bari (1963)
- Chhaya Surya (1963)
- Abhaya O Srikanta (1965)
- Nishipadma
- Sesh Porjonto (1969)
- Bagh Bondi Khela (1975)
- Datta (film) (1976)
- Bhola Moira (1977)
- Surya Sakhi (1981)
- Dui Bhai
- Ahoban
- Barnochora
- Pita Putro
- Mouchak
- Hirer Shikal (1988)
- Mahaprithibi (1991)
- Tolly Lights
- Santan (1999)
- Chirodini Tumi Je Amar
- Kathavasheshan (Malayalam)
- Parineeta

== Awards ==
For her lifetime contributions to Bengali cinema, in 1998 she received a star medal from the University of Calcutta from the then Governor of West Bengal Saiyid Nurul Hasan. She also got the presidential award for lifetime contribution to Bengali cinema and theater.
