= Jjhoom India =

- Directed by: Vipul D. Shah; Sanjiv Sharma
- Country of origin: India
- No. of seasons: 1

Production
- Editor: Umma Mishrra

Original release
- Network: Sahara One
- Release: 27 October 2007 – 19 January 2008

Jjhoom India is a musical reality show that aired on Sahara One channel, starting from 27 October 2007. Jjhoom India is an Indian adaptation of Stars on Stage, a Swedish format from Zodiac Television.

== Concept ==
Jjhoom India is a musical reality show wherein ten celebrities are paired with professional singers to take on specific challenges. The ten celebrities team up with singers to compete against each other for the grand prize. The singers train their celebrity partner, and the duo performs on the stage. Each week, the pairs have to perform a song based on specific themes: Disco, Swinging Sixties, R.D. Burman special, etc. One pair is eliminated every week. Viewers get a chance to vote for the best three teams every week.

=== Host/Anchor ===
- Rahul Vaidya
- Sucheta Khanna

=== Judges ===
- Mahesh Bhatt
- Shabana Azmi
- Anand Shah

== Contestants ==
=== Winners ===
- Sachin Tyagi and Madhushree

=== Finalists ===
- Varun Badola and Akriti Kakar

=== Contestants ===
- Jodi 1 - Vinod Rathod and Roshni Chopra
- Jodi 2 - Jatin Padit and Chhavi Mittal
- Jodi 3 - Varun Badola and Akriti Kakar
- Jodi 4 - Jolly Mukherjee and Shama Sikander
- Jodi 5 - Sharad Kelkar and Vaishali Samant
- Jodi 6 - Parthiv Gohil and Apara Mehta
- Jodi 7 - Sachin Tyagi and Madhushree
- Jodi 8 - Shekhar Suman and Sanjeevni
- Jodi 9 - Sudesh Bhosle and Mrinal Kulkarni
- Jodi 10- Suresh Wadkar and Shweta Tiwari
