= Bhola Moira (film) =

- ভোলা ময়রা
- Directed by: Piyush Ganguly
- Screenplay by: Bibhuti Mukherjee
- Based on: Life of Bhola Moira
- Produced by: Moonmoon Films
- Starring: Uttam Kumar; Supriya Devi; Bikash Roy
- Edited by: Ramesh Joshi
- Music by: Anil Bagchi
- Production company: Piyali Pictures
- Release date: 14 April 1977
- Running time: 132 minutes
- Country: India
- Language: Bengali

Bhola Moira is an Indian Bengali language biographical drama film directed by Piyush Ganguly based on the life of the nineteenth-century Bengali kabiyal Bhola Moira. The film stars Uttam Kumar, Supriya Devi and Bikash Roy in pivotal roles. It was released on 14 April 1977 under the banner of Piyali Films.

== Plot ==
The film follows the life of Bhola Moira, celebrated Bengali folk poet. The film explores his personal relationships, artistic fights, and competitions with other famous contemporary folk singers.

== Cast ==
- Uttam Kumar as Bhola Moira
- Supriya Devi
- Bikash Roy
- Satya Bandyopadhyay
- Bijon Bhattacharya
- Lily Chakravarty
- Biswajeet Chatterjee
- Tapan Chatterjee
- Gita Dey
- Anup Kumar
- Sulata Chowdhury
- Nilima Das
- Alpana Gupta
- Mani Srimani
