= Rita Ganguly =

Exponent in the Indian classical arts

- Born: 1940 (age 85–86); Lucknow, Uttar Pradesh, India
- Occupation: Classical musician
- Known for: Hindustani music
- Spouse: Keshav Kothari
- Children: a son and a daughter Meghna Kothari
- Parent(s): K. L. Ganguly; Meena
- Awards: Padma Shri; Sangeet Natak Akademi Award; Priyadarshi Award; Rajiv Gandhi Shiromani award Critics Circle of India Award; Broadcasters Association Lifetime Achievement Award

Rita Ganguly (born 1940) is an exponent in the Indian classical arts. An accomplished dancer, musician and vocalist, she was honoured with the Sangeet Natak Akademi Award in 2000 and with the Padma Shri in 2003. She is the mother of actress Meghna Kothari and the younger sister of the famous Ravindra Sangeet singer Gita Ghatak.

In 2025, she was awarded the Sangeet Natak Akademi Fellowship, the highest award of Sangeet Natak Akademi, India's National Academy for Performing arts, for her contribution to Indian music.

== Early life and education ==
Rita Ganguly was born in Lucknow, Uttar Pradesh, into a Bengali Brahmin family, and is the daughter of K. L. Ganguly, and Meena Ganguly. K. L. Ganguly was a freedom fighter and member of the Congress party. In 1938, he was selected by Jawaharlal Nehru to become the first editor of the National Herald, a newspaper founded by Nehru.

Rita therefore grew up in Lucknow, where the newspaper was based. She started learning Rabindrasangeet at the age of 12 under Gopeshwar Banerjee. She later joined Visva-Bharati University, along with her elder sister, Gita Ghatak with an emphasis on the arts whilst studying the Indian classical dance forms of Kathakali and Manipuri. She did further studies in Kathakali under renowned gurus, Kunchu Kurup and Chandu Pannikar and trained in modern dance at Martha Graham School, New York.

== Career ==
She performed at various stages including the Bolshoi Theatre, Russia and joined the National School of Drama (NSD) as a faculty member of dance where she is known to have introduced a new course of Movement and Mime. She taught at NSD for thirty years and during her tenure there, she is known to have contributed in productions and costume designing. She is also credited with efforts in the recreation of the classical theatre and in the construction of Vikrishta Madhyam Auditorium. Under the aegis of NSD, she visited many countries such as Australia, England, Sri Lanka and Israel where she presented performances and held workshops on Indian Classical Theatre.

In the fifties, a chance opportunity to sing during a performance in Delhi changed her career and she started concentrating more on singing. Encouraged by Shambhu Maharaj, renowned Kathak guru, she performed at many places in India along with Siddheshwari Devi, a known classical singer. It was during one of these performances, Begum Akhtar, renowned Hindustani singer, met Ganguly and took her as her disciple. The bond between the singers lasted till Akhtar's death in 1974.

Ganguly is a Ford Foundation Fellow and has a doctoral degree for her thesis on the female singers of Indian subcontinent. She produced a multimedia production, Ruh-e-ishq, incorporating the seven stages of Sufism, in 1997, to celebrate the fifty years of Indian Independence. She is known to have a liking for nazms, a genre of Urdu poetry and has composed music for the poems of such Bengali poets as Jibanananda, Shakti Chattopadhyay, Subhash Mukherjee, Shankho Ghosh, Sunil Gangopadhyay and Joy Goswami. She was involved with the Soumitra Chatterjee production, Homapakhi for which she composed the theme song. She has also acted in Darmiyaan, a feature film by Kalpana Lajmi.

Ganguly has performed at the Festival of India events held in UK and France. She is the author of a number of books related to art and music such as Bismillah Khan and Benaras, the Seat of Shehnai and Ae Mohabbat... Reminiscing Begum Akhtar. She is the founder of Kaladharmi, a non-profit organization to promote young talents in arts and the Begum Akhtar Academy of Ghazal, an academy for nurturing Ghazal tradition which has instituted annual awards to recognize excellence in Ghazal music. Her play on Begum Akhtar, Jamal-e-Begum Akhtar, has been staged on many occasions and she is planning a film on the life of Begum Akhtar in association with the known ghazal singer, Anup Jalota, involving filmmaker, Ketan Mehta and music director, A. R. Rahman.

Ganguly is the founder of Kaladharmi, a non-profit organization for the promotion of performing arts and Begum Akhtar Academy of Ghazals (BAAG), a ghazal academy. She appeared in the film Parineeta (2005) and is credited for the song Dhinak-Dhinak-Dha composed by Shantanu Moitra penned by Swanand Kirkire. She has also sung for the film Sarkar (2005) the song Deen Bandhu .

== Awards ==
She received the Sangeet Natak Akademi Award for music in 2000. The Government of India honoured her with the civilian award of Padma Shri in 2003. She is also a recipient of Priyadarshi Award, Rajiv Gandhi Shiromani award, Critics Circle of India award and the Lifetime Achievement Award of the Broadcasters Association of the Ministry of Information and Broadcasting.

== Personal life ==
She was married to Keshav Kothari, a former secretary of Sangeet Natak Akademi and the couple has two children, son Arijeet a poet and a daughter, Meghna Kothari who is an actress in Hindi films.

== See also ==
- Hindustani music
- Ghazal
- Nazm
- Begum Akhtar
- Siddheswari Devi
- National School of Drama
