= Nilkantha Bagchi =

Fictional character

- Ritwik Ghatak as Nilkantha Bagchi (centre) in the film Jukti Takko Aar Gappo
- First appearance: Jukti Takko Aar Gappo (1977)
- Last appearance: Meghe Dhaka Tara (2013)
- Created by: Ritwik Ghatak
- Based on: Ghatak's personality
- Portrayed by: Ritwik Ghatak; Saswata Chatterjee

In-universe information
- Gender: Male
- Occupation: Filmmaker; Theatre personality
- Spouse: Durga
- Children: Satya
- Religion: Hindu
- Nationality: Indian

Nilkantha Bagchi (alternative spelling Neelkantha Bagchi) is an iconic Bengali cinema character that first appeared in 1977 in Ritwik Ghatak's Jukti Takko Aar Gappo. In the 2013 film Meghe Dhaka Tara, the character portrayed by Saswata Chatterjee was named Nilkantha Bagchi. Chatterjee's character was based on the personality of Ritwik Ghatak.

The character of Debshankar, a painter, in the 2009 Bengali film Chha-e Chhuti, partially resembled Ritwik Ghatak's personality and Nilkantha Bagchi of Jukti Takko Aar Gappo. Debshankar delivered one of the most memorable quotations from Jukti Takko Aar Gappo, saying, ভাবো, ভাবা প্র্যাকটিস কর ("Think, practice thinking").

== Jukti Takko Aar Gappo ==
Jukti Takko Aar Gappo, made in 1974 and released in 1977, was Ghatak's last film. The film is considered to be the autobiographical film of Ghatak's alter ego. The film shows Nilkantha Bagchi, the protagonist, as an alcoholic, disillusioned Bengali intellectual. The film is set against the backdrop of the first Naxalite wave of rebellion in India. Ghatak explained, "In it the political backdrop of West Bengal from 1971 to 1972 as I saw it has been portrayed. There is no ideology. I saw it from a point of view of not a politician. I am not supposed to please a political ideology". Ghatak was aware of a complete breakdown of moral values around him, especially among the younger generation. He tried to portray these issues in this film and in his unfinished film Sei Vishnupriya.

== Meghe Dhaka Tara (2013) ==
In 2013, Bengali film director Kamaleswar Mukherjee made Meghe Dhaka Tara. The film was based on Ghatak's life and struggle. The name of the protagonist, Nilkantha Bagchi, was adopted from Jukti Takko Aar Gappo. The name of film was inspired from Ghatak's film Meghe Dhaka Tara (1969). The protagonist Nilkantha Bagchi (played by Saswata Chatterjee) resembled Ghatak's real life character.

== Influence ==
The character Nilkantha Bagchi is considered a cultural icon of Bengali cinema. The character of Debshankar, a painter in the 2009 Bengali film Chha-e Chhuti, partially resembled Ghatak's personality and that of Nilkantha Bagchi of Jukti Takko Aar Gappo. Debshankar also delivered one of the film's most famous lines, saying, Bhabo, bhaba practice koro ("Think, practise thinking").
