= Shama Sikander =

Indian Actress

- Sikander in 2022
- Born: Makrana, Rajasthan, India
- Education: Roshan Taneja School of Acting
- Occupations: Actress, Producer
- Years active: 1998–2021
- Spouse: James Milliron (m. 2022)

Shama Sikander is an Indian actress and fashion designer best known for portraying Pooja Mehta in Yeh Meri Life Hai (2003–2005).

== Early life and education ==
Shama Sikander was born on August 4, 1981 in Makrana, Rajasthan. Her family moved to Mumbai, Maharashtra in 1991 and struggled financially while she was growing up. She attended multiple schools in Makrana and Mumbai for her primary and secondary education. She trained at Roshan Taneja School of Acting in Mumbai.

Sikandar has three siblings.

== Career ==
Sikander began her acting career with minor roles in Prem Aggan (1998) and Mann (1999). She later appeared in Ansh: The Deadly Part (2002), and Yeh Mohabbat Hai (2002).

Sikander first gained prominence while portraying as Pooja Mehta in the coming-of-age dramaYe Meri Life Hai from 2003 to 2005. Her performance earned her a Gold Award for “Critics' Choice: Best Actress" in 2005, and two Indian Television Academy Awards—"GR8! Face of the Year" and "Best Debut" (2004). In 2005, she appeared in Chand Bujh Gaya, Faaiz Anwar's film based on the Godhra train burning; Central Board of Film Certification (CBFC) initially refused to grant exhibition certification for the film’s release and only complied after Bombay High Court ruled that the certification body was infringing on the constitutional rights of the filmmaker.

Sikander made guest appearances on several television shows, including Batliwala House No. 43 (2005), CID (2006), Jodee Kamaal Ki (2007), Kaajjal (2008), and Man Mein Hai Visshwas (2009). She also hosted a season of Zoom's Popkorn Newz (2007) and STAR One’s Jet Set Go (2008) before returning to film with a supporting role in Dhoom Dadakka (2008).

In 2010, Sikander launched her own fashion label “Saisha”. In 2011, she played the protagonist in Yash Raj Films’ supernatural thriller Seven; the show was cancelled after one season. Between 2012 and 2014, she was the lead antagonist in SAB TV’s Baal Veer. She was a celebrity contestant and performer on Jjhoom India (2007), Ek Khiladi Ek Haseena (2008), alongside notable Indian cricketer Vinod Kambli, and Boogie Woogie.

In March 2016, Sikander appeared in the short film Sexaholic. In early 2017, she played the titular role in director Vikram Bhatt’s webseries Maaya. In December 2017, she started her own production company and announced Ab Dil Ki Sunn (2018), a webseries comprising seven short films inspired by her own experience of living with mental illnesses.

In 2019, Sikander was seen in Bypass Road (2019). In March 2021, Sikander appeared in the music video for Hawa Karda by Koinage Records.

== Personal life ==
Sikandar is multilingual and speaks Hindi, English, Urdu, Gujarati, Marathi and Marwadi. She has been open about her experience of living with depression and bipolar disorder.

Sikandar was in a relationship with actor and musician Alexx O'Nell from 2011 to 2015. She met businessman James Milliron in 2015. The couple lived together for 8 years and got married on March 14, 2022.

== Filmography ==
=== Film ===
Year	Title	Role	Notes
1998	Prem Aggan	Pooja	
1999	Mann	Kamini	
2002	Yeh Mohabbat Hai		
2002	Ansh: The Deadly Part	Kusum	
2003	Basti		
2005	Chand Bujh Gaya	Saveen I. Jafri	
2008	Dhoom Dadakka	Jiya	
2008	Contract		Special appearances in "Maula Khair Kare"
2016	Sexaholic	Riya	Short film
2019	Bypass Road	Sarah	

=== Television ===
==== As an actress ====
Year	Show	Role	Channel	Notes
2003–2005	Yeh Meri Life Hai	Pooja	Sony TV	
2005	Batliwala House No. 43	Herself	Sony TV	1 episode
2006	C.I.D.	Minakshi	Sony TV	Ep. "Secret of the Code No. 571 E 1115"
2007	Jodee Kamaal Ki	Herself	Star Plus	Ep. “Raksha Bandhan Special”
2007	Popkorn Newz	Herself	Zoom	Host
2008	Kaajjal	Chameli	Sony TV	Cameo
2009	Man Mein Hai Visshwas	Rukhsana	Sony TV	1 episode
2010–2011	Seven	Shunyaa	Sony TV	
2012–2014	Baal Veer	Bhali Pari/Bhayankar Pari	SAB TV	

==== As herself ====
Year	Title	Channel
2008	Ek Khiladi Ek Haseena	Colors (TV channel)
2008	Jet Set Go	STAR One
2010	Jjhoom India	Sahara One
2010	Boogie Woogie	Sony TV

=== Web series ===
Year	Title	Role	Channel	Notes
2017	Maaya	Maaya	YouTube	Marseille Web Fest Official Selection 2017
2018	Ab Dil Ki Sunn		YouTube	Also producer

=== Music videos ===
Year	Song title	Album	Ref.
2001	Mirza	Lala Lala Lala	
2001	Chann Chaanani Raat	Saaun di jhadi	
2002	Baje Jo Bansi Thama Karo	Tere Bina	
2002	Kabhi Mausam Hua Resham	Tere Bina	
2020	Majnu Remix	N/A	
2021	Hawa Karda	Hawa Karda	

== Awards and nominations ==
Year	Award	Presenter	Result
2004	Best Actress in a Lead Role	Indian Telly Awards	Nominated
2004	Fresh New Face	Indian Telly Awards	Nominated
2004	GR8 Face of the Year	Indian Television Academy Awards	Won
2004	Best Debut	Indian Television Academy Awards	Won
2005	Critics' Choice: Best Actress	12th Lions Gold Awards	Won
2019	Most Promising Actor	Black Swan Awards, Asia One	Won
