= Dhoom Dadakka =

2008 Indian film

- DVD cover
- Directed by: Shashi Ranjan
- Written by: Kabir Srivastav (dialogue)
- Screenplay by: Shashi Ranjan; Kabir Srivastav; Ashwni Dhir
- Produced by: Shashi Ranjan
- Starring: Anupam Kher; Gulshan Grover; Satish Kaushik; Satish Shah; Sammir Dattani; Shaad Randhawa; Aarti Chhabria; Deepshikha Nagpal
- Cinematography: Arvind Kumar
- Edited by: Abhay Pandey
- Music by: Roop Kumar Rathod
- Production company: Anushka Images Pvt Ltd
- Distributed by: Eros International
- Release date: 23 May 2008
- Country: India
- Language: Hindi

Dhoom Dadakka is a 2008 Indian Hindi-language comedy-drama film directed by Shashi Ranjan starring Anupam Kher, Gulshan Grover, Satish Kaushik, Satish Shah, Sammir Dattani, Shaad Randhawa, Aarti Chhabria and Deepshikha Nagpal.

== Cast ==
- Anupam Kher as Mungilal
- Gulshan Grover as Fursat Lala
- Satish Kaushik as Johnny English
- Satish Shah as Jignesh
- Sammir Dattani as Ranbir
- Shaad Randhawa as Rahul
- Aarti Chhabria as Shivani Sawant
- Deepshikha Nagpal as Rambha J. English
- Bhavana Balsavar as Mungilal's sister
- Zac as Zac
- Shama Sikander
- Bobby Darling
- Jackie Shroff as Godfather in a guest appearance

== Production ==
Shama Sikander returns after a hiatus in a glamorous role. Anupam Kher, Gulshan Grover and Satish Kaushik sang a Holi song in the film.

== Reception ==
A critic from The Times of India wrote that "Despite of three big dadas of comedy - Anupam Kher, Satish Shah, Satish Kaushik - sharing celluloid space in a single film, the outcome is not as expected". Taran Adarsh, writing for Bollywood Hungama stated that "On the whole, Dhoom Dadakka could've been a decent timepass flick, but it misses the bus". Rajeev Masand of CNN-IBN opined that "No prizes for guessing, I’m going with zero out of five for director Shashi Ranjan’s Dhoom Dadakka, it’s a showcase for some of the worst acting you’re likely to see at the movies in a long, long time". Ameeta Gupta of Rediff.com rated the film two-and-a-half out of five stars and said that "Not a movie for all unless comedy is your poison".
