= Ansh: The Deadly Part =

- Directed by: Sai Thalvar
- Written by: Sandeep Joshi
- Produced by: Suresh Sharma
- Starring: Abbas; Ashutosh Rana; Om Puri; Milind Gunaji; Rajat Bedi; Sharbani Mukherjee; Shama Sikander; Ashish Vidyarthi; Sayaji Shinde; Alok Nath; Ravi Kishan; Pankaj Berry; Ishrat Ali; Yunus Parvez; Mushtaq Khan
- Cinematography: V. Subbarao
- Edited by: Arun-Shekhar
- Music by: Nadeem–Shravan
- Production company: Rukamanee Arts
- Release date: 26 April 2002
- Country: India
- Language: Hindi

Ansh : The Deadly Part is a 2002 Indian Hindi-language crime thriller film written and directed by Rajan Jori, starring Abbas (In his Hindi film debut), Ashutosh Rana, Om Puri and Rajat Bedi.

== Plot ==
Deputy Superintendent of Police Bhagat Pandey is described as thorough and honest, with a track record of apprehending criminals. This background creates problems for him with other criminals, who are closely connected to powerful politicians. As a result, he is transferred to Bombay (now known as Mumbai). He takes charge of his post and attempts to reform the local police. Politicians and criminals dislike his diligence and talk about transferring him to Kashmir, where he will be killed in an encounter with a terrorist. Bhagat also comes in touch with suspended Police Inspector Sukhdev Singh, and gang leader, Rajnath Guru, the son of a freedom-fighter, Dinanathji.

== Cast ==
- Abbas as Rajnaath Guru
- Om Puri as Bhagath Pandey
- Ashutosh Rana as Sukhdev Singh
- Sharbani Mukherji as Shweta
- Shama Sikander as Kusum
- Rajat Bedi as Munna
- Ashish Vidyarthi as Dawoo
- Sayaji Shinde as Govind Edda
- Milind Gunaji as Babu Bakshi
- Alok Nath as Dina Nathji
- Ravi Kishan as Dhoble
- Pankaj Berry as Inspector Patil
- Ishrat Ali as Bhawani Chaudhary
- Mushtaq Khan as M. P. Patel
- Yunus Parvez as Yadav

== Soundtrack ==
Ansh: The Deadly Part

Soundtrack album by Nadeem–Shravan
- Released: 2001
- Recorded: 2001
- Genre: Feature film soundtrack
- Length: 44:00
- Label: Saregama

The music of the film was composed by Nadeem–Shravan with the lyrics written by Sameer Anjaan.

#	Title	Singer(s)
1.	"Masoom Chehra"	Sonu Nigam, Alka Yagnik
2.	"Hum Apni Taraf Se"	Kumar Sanu, Alka Yagnik
3.	"Dhoom Machi Hai"	Udit Narayan, Dimple
4.	"Mumbai Mein"	K. K., Shaan, Hozef & Tausif
5.	"Beech Bajaria"	Sapna Awasthi
6.	"Sirf Sunday Ko"	Kavita Krishnamurthy
7.	"Desh Ko Yaaro"	Mohammed Aziz
8.	"Masoom Chehra" (Male)	Sonu Nigam
