= Ek Khiladi Ek Haseena =

Ek Khiladi Ek Haseena (lit. 'A Player and A Beauty') may refer to:

- Ek Khiladi Ek Haseena (film), a 2005 Indian Hindi crime thriller film
- Ek Khiladi Ek Haseena (TV series), an Indian reality dance series broadcast on Colors TV in 2008
