= Bypass Road (film) =

Indian Hindi-language murder mystery film

- Theatrical release poster
- Directed by: Naman Nitin Mukesh
- Written by: Neil Nitin Mukesh
- Produced by: Madan Paliwal; Sonal Deshpande; Neil Nitin Mukesh
- Starring: Neil Nitin Mukesh; Adah Sharma; Shama Sikander
- Cinematography: Fasahat Khan
- Edited by: Bunty Nagi; Vinay Pal
- Music by: Songs: Raaj Aashoo; Rohan-Rohan; Sharib-Toshi; Score: Daniel B. George
- Production companies: Miraj Film Creations; NNM Films
- Distributed by: PVR Pictures
- Release date: 8 November 2019
- Running time: 118 minutes
- Country: India
- Language: Hindi
- Box office: est. ₹1.16 crore

Bypass Road is a 2019 Indian Hindi-language thriller film directed by Naman Nitin Mukesh and written by Neil Nitin Mukesh. The film features Neil Nitin Mukesh, Adah Sharma and Shama Sikander in lead roles. The film is produced by Neil Nitin Mukesh in association with Miraj Group. The film was released theatrically on 8 November 2019.

== Plot ==
Vikram Kapoor, a renowned fashion designer, has an accident one night and one of his top models Sarah Brigenza is found dead the same night in what looks like a suicide. Vikram is paralyzed from the accident and has to use a wheelchair for the rest of his life. He returns home after years, to where his father Pratap Kapoor and stepmother Romila live.

Police suspect Sarah was murdered and Vikram becomes a suspect. The accidents were apparently arranged by Romila, who wants to acquire Pratap's assets with her real daughter Nandini. A flashback shows that Sarah and Vikram had a one-night stand, after which Sarah, though engaged to Jimmy, wanted to be Vikram's girlfriend. After being refused, she shot herself. Vikram realized no witness would prove his innocence if Sarah was found dead there so he drove her body to her house, where it was later found.

In the present, Vikram sees Romila's ex-boyfriend Narang Kapoor sneak into his house to meet Romila, implying that the two had planned the accidents in the house that nearly killed him. Jimmy is another suspect in Sarah's death because he was seen in CCTV footage escaping from her house right after the gunshot was heard. However, Jimmy is on the run from cops and parts of the footage in Sarah's house is missing. The existing part of the footage shows that Jimmy arrived, learned that the two had an affair, and fought with Vikram.

Pratap, Romila and Nandini leave for a cruise trip, leaving Vikram at home alone. A masked man then enters the house to attack and kill Vikram. Paralyzed Vikram calls his girlfriend Radhika for help but is caught by the attacker. Police Inspector Roy arrives right then and shoots the masked attacker. To everyone's shock, it is Vikram's father Pratap.

Roy now reveals the story: Sarah called Pratap to inform him that she found his gun, which he had lost; it had been in Vikram's possession. When Pratap arrived, he witnessed Vikram and Jimmy fighting so he shot Sarah to frame Vikram; the two then escaped to avoid suspicion.

It is revealed that Vikram never lost his legs; he, along with his doctor, planned to act handicapped to avenge his mother's death. Pratap is actually his uncle who had killed his mother for money, and had planned Vikram's accident.

== Cast ==
- Neil Nitin Mukesh as Vikram Kapoor
- Adah Sharma as Radhika Nair, Vikram's girlfriend
- Shama Sikander as Sarah Brigenza
- Sudhanshu Pandey as Narang Kapoor
- Rajit Kapur as Pratap Kapoor
- Gul Panag as Romila “Romzi” Kapoor
- Tripti Shukla
- Manish Choudhary as Inspector Himanshu Roy
- Taher Shabbir as Jimmy Brigenza
- Pahal Mange (Child Artist) as Nandini
- Varun Singh Rajput as Ajay
- Errol Peter Marks as Raayo
- Bhavana Rao as Sonia
- Mukesh Bhatt as Kaka
- Ram Sujan Singh as Constable Ravi Singh

== Production ==
Principal photography commenced in September 2018 in Alibaug and Lonavala over a span of three months. The film was released theatrically on 8 November 2019.

== Soundtrack ==
Bypass Road

Soundtrack album by Raaj Ashoo, Rohan-Rohan and Sharib-Toshi
- Released: 21 October 2019
- Genre: Feature film soundtrack
- Length: 11:21
- Label: T-Series
External audio
- Official Audio Jukebox on YouTube

This music of the film is composed by Raaj Ashoo, Rohan-Rohan, Sharib-Toshi and Mayur Jumani while lyrics written by Shabbir Ahmed, Rohan Gokhale and Kalim Shaikh. The song, "So Gaya Yeh Jahaan" is a remake from the song of the same name from Tezaab. It's the second remake after Nautanki Saala

Track listing
No.	Title	Lyrics	Music	Singer(s)	Length
1.	"So Gaya Yeh Jahan"	Shabbir Ahmed	Raaj Ashoo	Nitin Mukesh feat. Jubin Nautiyal, Saloni Thakkar	2:32
2.	"Tanha Mera Pyaar"	Rohan Gokhale	Rohan-Rohan	Mohit Chauhan	5:17
3.	"Ishq Maine Paaya"	Kalim Shaikh	Sharib-Toshi	Sharib Sabri	3:32
4.	"Guide"	Olivia Dawn	Mayur Jumani	Mayur Jumani, Olivia Dawn	4:38
5.	"Troubled Land"	Hanita Bambri	Mayur Jumani	Hanita Bambri	3:19
Total length:					11:21

== Reception ==
Filmfare gave 3 stars out of 5 and said, 'Bypass Road may have aspired to soar high as a slasher flick but faulty writing kind of clips its wings.'

=== Box office ===
Bypass Road's opening day domestic collection was ₹18 lacs. On the second day, the film collected ₹18 lacs. On the third day, the film collected ₹18 lacs, taking total opening weekend collection to ₹54 lacs. The lifetime collection of film was ₹11.6 million.
