= Kavigan =

Bengali folk form

Kobi Gaan
- Native name: কবি গান
- Stylistic origins: Bengali folk song
- Cultural origins: British India

Kavigan (Bengali: কবিগান), Kobi Gaan, Kobi Lorai or Kabigan is a form of Bengali folk performance wherein folk poets sing and perform. A verbal duel among the poets, this mystic minstrels art was popular with rural folk form in nineteenth century in Bengal region, which includes the Indian state of West Bengal and Bangladesh.. The mythological themes from both Hindu and Muslims religious texts were commonly used for Kobi Gaan.

== Form ==
Kavigan is normally sung by two groups. Each group is led by a kaviyal or sarkar. The accompanying singers called dohars often repeat what the leader said. A kavigan programme starts with bandana (evocation) or gurudever geet (song of the sect patron). The bandana can be directed to or be in praise of Saraswati, Ganesh, people, and the audience, as deemed fit by a particular kaviyal. This is followed by Radha–Krishna related song, some call it agamani. Then songs on four subjects are sung: sakhi sambad, biraha, lahar and kheur. Sakhi sambad deals with the love-songs related to Radha-Krishna. Biraha is about the mortal pang of separation of common human beings. Kheur is mainly about gods and goddesses, but often includes mild slangs. Finally, the competitive part starts. It mainly consists of the Lahar, where the competitors personally attack each other, musico-verbally. In kavigan, also referred to as kabir larai, two person who are lyricist plus composer at the same time answer each other in form of songs.

== History ==
In his Banglar Kavigan, Sajani Kanta Das said, "Kavigan was born out of a synthesis of various art forms prevalent in different parts of Bengal at different times having peculiar names such as tarja, panchali, kheur, akhrai, half akhrai, full akhrai, danra kavigan, basa kavigan, dhap kirtan, tappa, Krishna jatra, tukkagiti etc." Various literary researchers such as Ishwar Chandra Gupta and Dr. Harekrishna Mukhopadhyay have dwelt at length on the origins and development of kavigan.

Dr. Sushil Kumar Dey opines, "The existence of kabi songs may be traced to the beginning of the 18th century or even beyond it to the 17th; but the flourishing period of the Kabiwalas was between 1760 and 1830." As the religious and ritualistic content in Bengali poetry wore out there was a tendency to break away from the traditional Vaishnava poetry but the real breakthrough came only with the introduction of the printing press in mid–18th century. From the close of the 18th century for more than half a century the new kavi–poetry and panchali reigned supreme in the Kolkata region and almost threatened to sweep everything else in literature. However, while Kavigan lost its supremacy in Kolkata, it retained its position in rural Bengal.

The mug of Mymensingh is better, and the kai fish of Khulna;
Dhaka's pataksir is better, and the yoghurt of Bankura;
The sweetmeat makers of Krishnanagar are better, and the mangoes of Maldaha;
Ulo's male monkeys are better, and the blackberries of Murshidabad;
The fathers-in-law of Rangpur are better, and the sons–in–law of Rajshahi;
The boats of Noakhali are better, and the midwives of Chittagong;
The Kayets of Dinajpur are better, and the wine sellers of Howrah;
The Vaishnavas of Pabna are better, and the mudi of Faridpur;
The cultivators of Burdwan are better, and the milkmen of 24-Paraganas;
The girls of Guptipara are better–beware your line will soon become extinct.
The fighters and ruffians of Hughli are better, and the buttermilk of Birbhum.
It is better if the rhythm of the dhak stops and all utter the name of Hari in chorus.

— Banglapedia

Dr. Sushil Kumar Dey has a word of praise for the kaviyals, "These poets were, no doubt, born among the people (lowest classes), lived with the people and understood perfectly their ways of thinking and feeling; hence their direct hold upon the masses of whom many a modern writer is contentedly ignorant."

Kobigaan was a debating contest between two minstrels (Kobiaal | the poets of the Kobigaan genre) and their troupes (Dohars) in Verse with some traditional musical instruments of Bengal. The mythological themes as well as the erotic themes were used. When mythological themes was used in Kobigaan, that was called Torja, this Torja was an old and traditional Kobi Gaan. The Kheyur was the second type Kobi Gaan in which erotic themes like Radha and Krishna were used as metaphorically. The originated of the Kheyur was Krishnanagar under the patronage of Raja Krishna Chandra of Nadia District. The Dhaak, Harmonium, Kansi, Mandira and drum were the main musical instrument used in Kobi Gaan. The Kobi Gaan is still performed in villages of Bengal with a small scale.

== Kaviyals ==
A number of kaviyals attained popularity and fame. In Birbhum district alone there were about three hundred kaviyal from the 18th–20th century. Amongst the earliest were Lokokabi Lambodar Chakroborty, Gonjla Guin, born in the 18th century and his contemporaries: Lalu–Nandalal, Raghu and Ramji. The famous 19th century kaviyals of Kolkata were Haru Thakur, Nitai Vairagi, Ram Basu, Bhola Maira, and Anthony Firinghee.

Some of kaviyals in other parts of Bengal were Balahari Roy (1743–1849), Sambhunath Mondal (1773–1833), Tarakchandra Sarker (1845–1914), Haricharan Acharya (1861–1941), Ramesh Chandra Shil (1877–1967), Rajendranath Sarkar (1892–1974), Bijaykrishna Adhikari (1903–1985), Nishikanto Raysarkar.

Mukunda Das, more popular as a charan kavi, was also a kaviyal. His character was featured in a popular Bengali film Balika Bodhu, wherein the songs of Mukunda Das inspired the rural masses during the independence movement,

Another famous kaviyal, Anthony Firingee, a Portuguese man, was featured in a Bengali biographical film bearing his name, with Uttam Kumar portraying him.

Bhola Moira (19th century) kaviyal was a popular and entertaining singer who could keep his audience mesmerised. Realising the importance of popular entertainment, Ishwar Chandra Vidyasagar complimented Bhola Moira and said, "To awaken the society of Bengal, it is necessary to have orators like Ramgopal Ghosh, amusing men like Hutom Pyancha and folk singers like Bhola Moira". Bhola Moira is a biographical film about him, made in 1977.
