= Prem Aggan =

1998 Indian film by Feroz Khan

- Directed by: Feroz Khan
- Written by: Feroz Khan
- Produced by: Feroz Khan
- Starring: Fardeen Khan; Meghna Kothari; Anupam Kher
- Cinematography: Kabir Lal
- Edited by: Feroz Khan
- Music by: Anu Malik
- Release date: 30 October 1998
- Country: India
- Language: Hindi
- Box office: ₹6.05 crore

Prem Aggan (meaning:- The fire of love) is a 1998 Indian Hindi-language Drama film written and directed by Feroz Khan. The film stars Fardeen Khan and Meghna Kothari and Shama Sikander. Fardeen is Feroz's son who made his debut in the film, he got the Filmfare Award for Best Male Debut for his role. The film bombed at the box office but gained cult status for being so bad it's good.

== Plot ==
Sapna is sent to Australia by her father, Jai Kumar, to marry a man of his choice. However, Sapna is in love with Suraj Singh, a musician. Suraj follows her to Australia, determined to win her back.

In Australia, Sapna faces challenges and emotional turmoil as she grapples with her feelings for Suraj. Despite her father’s disapproval, she continues to meet Suraj secretly. The story unfolds with melodrama, misunderstandings, and intense emotions.

As the film progresses, Sapna’s health deteriorates due to her inner conflict. She falls seriously ill, and Suraj is devastated. In a dramatic turn of events, Sapna’s life hangs in the balance, and Suraj must fight to save her.

== Cast ==
- Fardeen Khan as Suraj Singh
- Meghna Kothari as Sapna Kumar
- Sameer Malhotra as Vishal Kumar
- Shama Sikander as Pooja Kumar
- Sanjay Sippy
- Anupam Kher as Jai Kumar
- Raj Babbar as Captain Veer Bahadur Singh
- Beena Banerjee as Sheena Kumar
- Smita Jaykar as Seema Singh
- Karan Kapoor as Sangha
- Satish Shah as Principal Balan
- Rakesh Bedi as Hiralal
- Dinesh Hingoo as Motilal
- Ram Sethi
- Geeta Agarwal Sharma
- Bobby Simha
- Feroz Khan

== Soundtrack ==
Prem Aggan

Soundtrack album by Anu Malik
- Released: 24 July 1998
- Genre: Feature film soundtrack

#	Title	Singer(s)	Length	Lyricist(s)
1	"Khatey Hain Kasam"	Udit Narayan, Sadhana Sargam	06:34	Sudarshan Faakir
2	"Hum Tumse Mohabbat Karte Hain"	Udit Narayan, Kavita Krishnamurthy	06:29	Rahat Indori
3	"Tere Pyar Ki Aag Mein"	Hariharan, Sadhana Sargam	06:43	Sudarshan Faakir
4	"Har Dam Dam Bedam"	Hariharan, Shankar Mahadevan, Feroz Khan	07:00	M. G. Hashmat
5	"Har Dam Dam Bedam (duet)"	Hariharan, Sadhana Sargam	07:00	M.G. Hashmat
5	"Exercise"	Priscilla Corner	02:55	Santosh Anand
6	"Prem Ishwar Ishq Khuda Hai"	Udit Narayan, Sapna Mukherjee	06:30	Santosh Anand
7	"Dekh Ke Tujh Ko"	Abhijeet, Priscilla Corner	06:54	Sudarshan Faakir

== Reception ==
Syed Firdaus Ashraf of Rediff.com called the film ″Prem Agony″, stating, ″There were a lot of expectations from this film, since Feroz Khan was betting his son's career on it. But the script and the music are ordinary; only the title song, Prem Aggan, is passable. ″Face it, guys and gals, Prem Aggan just isn't worth the trouble.″ Deccan Herald wrote, "Stylish villas, breathtaking locales, inimitable music - the hallmark of Feroz Khan`s films are all there, but what`s missing is urbanity which generally suffuses the plot and characters in Feroz`s films."

Retrospectively, many reviewers put this film on the list of "worst movie ever made" for being "so bad it's good".

Fardeen Khan's performance was not well received yet he was awarded Filmfare Award for Best Male Debut for his performance. In 2022, during an interview, Khan stated, ″I don't think I deserve that award. It was a culture and stuff back then, that people got awards like that. I look at my work, I definitely didn't deserve that. The film didn't work, I didn't work, I looked back and I thought I was horrible.″
