= Ram Basu =

Bengali folk poet (1786–1828)

Ram Basu (1786 – 1828) was a Bengali folk poet (Locally Kabiyal). He was called Biraha-Sangiter Raja for his best contribution in Folk poetry (Kabigaan).

== Born ==
He was born in 1786 at Shalikha Village in Howrah in British India.

== Education ==
He received Primary Education from Jorashako, Also learned English language.
