= Lokokabi Lambodar Chakroborty =

Lokokabi Lambodar Chakroborty was the kavial of Birbhum. Kavials take his name at bandana gaan. Primary school Lokokabi Lambodar Chackroborty operates at Kharun near Rampurhat at Birbhum in the Indian state of West Bengal.
