= Subarnarekha (film) =

1965 Indian film

- A poster for Subarnarekha.
- Directed by: Ritwik Ghatak
- Screenplay by: Ritwik Ghatak
- Story by: Radheshyam Jhunjhunwala
- Starring: Abhi Bhattacharya; Madhabi Mukherjee; Satindra Bhattacharya; Bijon Bhattacharya; Pitambar; Indrani Chakrabarty; Sriman Tarun; Ritwik Ghatak
- Cinematography: Dilip Rajan Mukherjee
- Edited by: Ramesh Joshi
- Music by: Ustad Bahadur Khan
- Release date: 1 October 1965
- Running time: 143 min.
- Language: Bengali

Subarnarekha (Bengali: সুবর্ণরেখা Subarṇarekhā) is an Indian Bengali film directed by Ritwik Ghatak. It was produced in 1962 but not released until 1965. It is a part of the trilogy that includes Meghe Dhaka Tara (1960), Komal Gandhar (1961) and Subarnarekha (1962), all dealing with the aftermath of the Partition of India in 1947 and the refugees coping with it.

== Plot summary ==
The film tells the story of Ishwar Chakraborty, a Hindu refugee from East Pakistan after the 1947 partition of India. He goes to West Bengal with his little sister Sita where he tries to start a new life. In a refugee camp, they see the abduction of a low-caste woman and Ishwar takes her little son Abhiram with him. He gets a job at a factory in the province, near the Subarnarekha River, courtesy of his college friend Rambilas. Ishwar, Sita and Abhiram arrive at Chatimpur, a small settlement near Ghatshila where they meet Mukherjee, foreman of the foundry workshop, who greets them with love.

Abhiram is sent to Jhargram for education shortly after and Sita becomes lonely. Abhiram completes his study successfully and comes back on the very day Ishwar is appointed as the new manager. Abhiram finds that Ishwar had already arranged for his application in a German University to pursue his career further in engineering, but to his foster-brother's surprise, he refuses and decides to become a writer instead. Soon after, he and Sita realise that they are in love. But at this moment, Ishwar's fear of prejudice emerges, as he does not want his sister, a Brahmin, to marry a lower caste boy. At the same time, Abhiram's caste gets exposed to the others also when he recognizes his dying mother at rail station in front of many people. Ishwar senses danger and asks Abhiram to leave for Calcutta when he gives proposal to marry Sita. During Sita's wedding with another man, the girl and Abhiram elope and go to Calcutta. Ishwar is angry and heartbroken.

Sita and Abhiram live in the slums of Calcutta and try to make ends meet. They have a little son. One day, Abhiram gets a new job as a bus driver, but this leads to tragedy: when he accidentally hits and kills a little girl, he is lynched by the crowd. In her desperate situation, Sita is forced to think about taking up prostitution.

In the meantime, Ishwar is living a lonely and sad life in the province. When his old time friend Haraprasad comes to visit him, they decide to go to Calcutta on a binge drinking tour. They finally end up in a brothel, both completely drunk. When Ishwar staggers into one of the bedchambers, he is faced... with his own sister, whose first "client" he should become. Sita immediately recognizes him and cuts her own throat rather than have her brother see how far she has fallen. She dies. When Ishwar realizes what has happened, he breaks down.

At the end of the film, the now completely broken Ishwar meets Sita's little son, Binu, who is now his closest relative. Ishwar and Binu arrives at Ghatshila rail station. Just as the train leaves, Ishwar receives a letter from foreman Mukherjee through which he discovers that he has been sacked from his managerial job because of his honesty and the legal matters he faced after her sister killed herself. Mukherjee is now the new manager and he asks Ishwar to vacate the quarter. Ishwar, at first, feels lost but as he sees little Binu, he brightens up and decides to take the little boy under his wings. The film ends with the two approaching the quarter along the banks of Subarnarekha, with Binu, not knowing the reality filled with joy at seeing his new home, the story he has been told by his mother many times, while Ishwar pants but still does not reveal the truth in order not to spoil his nephew's dream.

== Credits ==
=== Cast ===
- Abhi Bhattacharya as Iswar Chakraborty
- Bijon Bhattacharya as Haraprasad
- Indrani Chakraborty as Little Sita
- Gita Dey as Koushalya (Bagdi Bou)
- Master Tarun as Little Abhiram
- Ranen Roy Choudhury as Baul
- Abanish Bandopadhyay as Hari Babu
- Radha Govinda Ghosh as Manager
- Ritwik Ghatak as Music Teacher
- Madhabi Mukhopadhyay as Sita
- Satindra Bhattacharya as Abhiram
- Jahor Roy as Mukherjee (Foreman)
- Umanath Bhattacharya as Akhil Babu
- Sita Mukhopadhyay as Kajal Didi
- Pitambar as Rambilas

=== Crew ===
- Story: Ritwik Ghatak, Radheshyam Jhunjhunwala
- Screenplay: Ritwik Ghatak
- Cinematography: Dilip Rajan Mukherjee
- Editing: Ramesh Joshi
- Sound: Satyen Chatterjee
- Art Direction: Rabi Chatterjee
- Music: Ustad Bahadur Khan

== Soundtrack ==
The film's soundtrack consists of the following songs composed by Ustad Bahadur Khan:

- Aaj dhaner khete roudro chhayay...
- Ali, dekh bhor bhai... kahan jage...
- Aaj ki ananda, aaj ki ananda, jhulat jhulane Shyamchanda...
- Mor dukhuya ka se kahun... aaj'
- Khelan aaye... kuhar phuhar

== Accolades ==
In a critics' poll of all-time greatest films conducted by Asian film magazine Cinemaya in 1998, Subarnarekha was ranked at #11 on the list. Critic Girish Shambu, director Ashim Ahluwalia and 2 others included the film on their respective lists of "The Greatest Films of All Time" (polled by Sight and Sound), making it the 322nd best film according to the Directors' poll. Ahluwalia considers it to be "one of the most intuitive, messy and haunting films ever made with the best drunk taxi ride in the history of cinema."
