= Begaana (1963 film) =

- Directed by: Sadashiv Rao Kavi
- Starring: Dharmendra; Supriya Chowdhury; Agha; Tarun Bose
- Music by: Sapan Jagmohan
- Production company: Sadashiv Chitra
- Release date: 1963
- Country: India
- Language: Hindi

Begaana is a 1963 Hindi is a romantic drama film. It was produced by Sadshiv Chitra and directed by Sadashiv Rao Kavi. The story was written by Mushtaq Jalili. The film stars Dharmendra, Supriya Chowdhury, Agha, Sailesh Kumar, Tarun Bose and Madhavi. The music is by Sapan Jagmohan with lyrics by Shailendra.

The film is a romantic triangle, filled with misunderstandings especially when the past lover (Sailesh Kumar) enters the life of a happily married couple. It's a drama that depicts the true bonding and love of a wife towards her husband.

== Cast ==
- Supriya Chowdhury
- Dharmendra
- Agha
- Sailesh Kumar
- Madhavi
- Manorama
- Tarun Bose
- Babloo

== Soundtrack ==
=== Song list ===
| # | Title | Singer |
|---|---|---|
| 1 | "Phir Woh Bhuli Si Yaad Aayi Hai" | Mohammed Rafi |
| 2 | "Na Jaane Kahan Kho Gaya Woh Zamana" | Mukesh |
| 3 | "Daanton Ka Zamana Pyare Daant Bachana" | Mahendra Kapoor |
| 4 | "Bulati Hai Bahar Chale Hum Dono Koyal Bole" | Lata Mangeshkar |
| 5 | "Tosay Nazar Ladi Sajna Re Mere Man" | Asha Bhosle |
| 6 | "Pyar Nibhana Bhool Na Jana Sajan Salone" | Asha Bhosle |
| 7 | "Sagar Ka Jhilmil Pani Machhariya Balkhati Jaye" | Asha Bhosle, Manna Dey |
| 8 | "Aaye Gayo More Man Bhaye Gayo Dil Mein Samaye Gayo" | Usha Mangeshkar, Lata Mangeshkar |
