= Gita Ghatak =

Indian actress and singer

- Born: Gita Ganguly; 23 January 1931
- Died: 17 November 2009 (aged 78); Kolkata, West Bengal, India
- Occupations: Actress, singer

Gita Ghatak (Geeta Ghatak née Ganguly) (23 January 1931 – 17 November 2009) was an Indian actress and singer. She mainly acted in Bengali cinema. Gita Ghatak was also an exponent of Rabindra Sangeet. She had her primary lessons in Tagore songs from celebrated artistes like Sailajaran Majumdar and Indira Debi Choudhurani, having a brief stint in Indian classical music too in her long music career of 65 years. She was closely associated with the All India Radio, Kolkata. She was also a teacher at South Point School, Kolkata (where she taught all sorts of subjects including English as well as music). Her husband Anish Chandra Ghatak was the nephew of noted Bengali movie director Ritwik Ghatak and son of noted Bengali author Manish Ghatak.She is the eldest sister of Thumri and Ghazal maestro Padma Shri Rita Ganguly and Her Grand Niece is singer Nikhita Gandhi

== Career ==
Her notable works include Meghe Dhaka Tara, Bari Theke Paliye, Ekti Nadir Naam.

== Selected filmography ==
Year	Film	English Title
1958	Bari Theke Paliye	The Runaway
1959	Meghe Dhaka Tara	The Cloud-Capped Star
2002	Ekti Nadir Naam	The Name of a River
2010	Beyond Borders	
