= Debabrata Biswas =

Bengali singer (1911 – 1980)

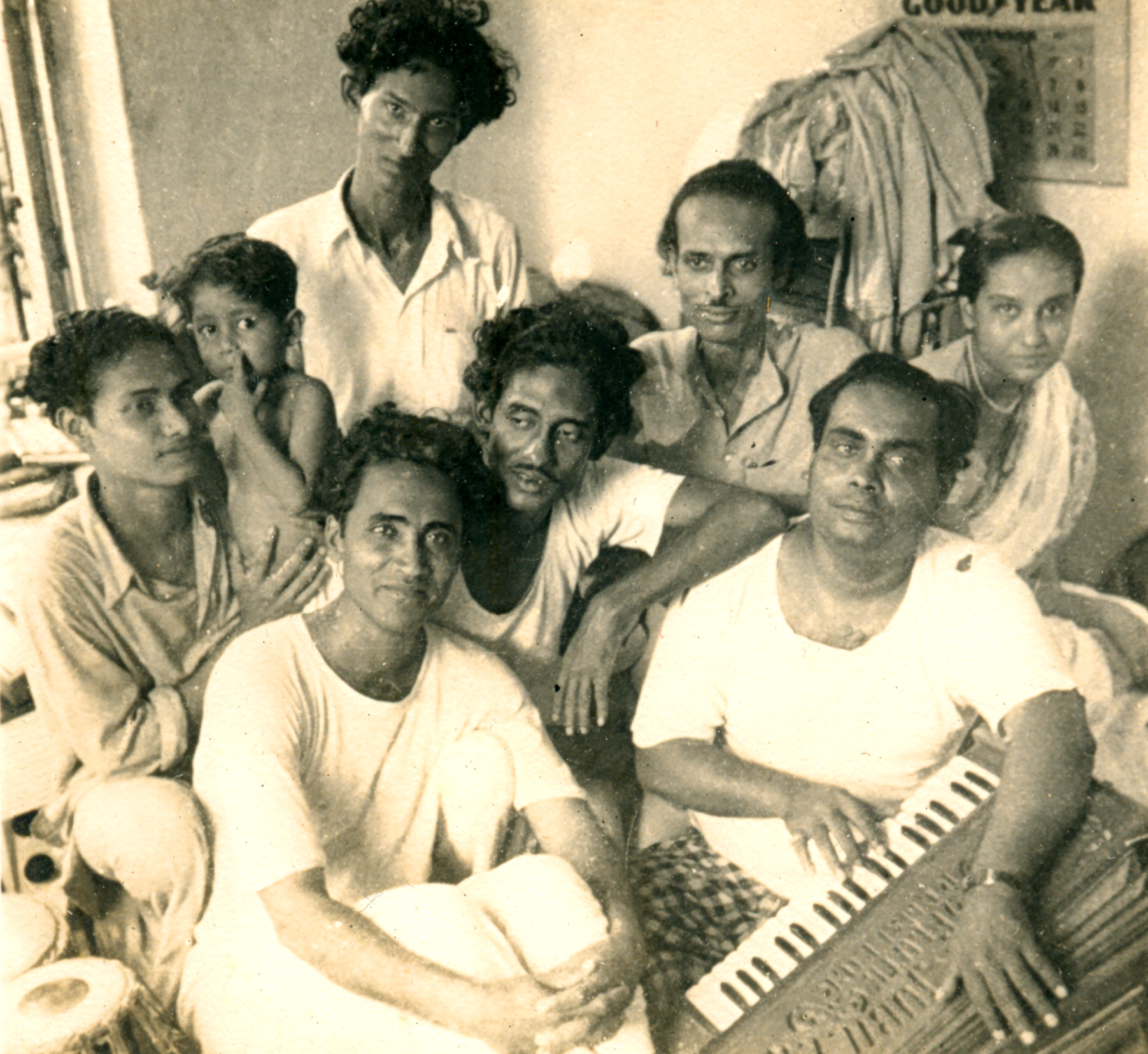
- Biswas (rightmost, front row) with his fellow IPTA singers
- Born: Debabrata Biswas; 23 August 1911; Kishoreganj, Bengal Presidency, British India (present-day Bangladesh)
- Died: 18 August 1980 (aged 68); Ballygunge, Calcutta, West Bengal, India
- Other name: George-da
- Education: University of Calcutta (graduate)
- Occupation: Vocalist
- Years active: 1940–1971
- Known for: Rabindra Sangeet performer
- Parent(s): Debendra Kishore Biswas, Abala devi

Debabrata Biswas (also known as George Biswas or George-da; 23 August 1911 – 18 August 1980) was an Indian vocalist known for his interpretation of Rabindra Sangeet, a genre of music composed by Rabindranath Tagore.

== Early life ==
Biswas was born in 1911 in Kishoreganj, in the Mymensingh District of the Bengal Presidency, during the period of British India.

== Controversy and later life ==
In 1964, Biswas began using Western instruments—such as the Spanish guitar, saxophone, clarinet, piano, and cello—alongside traditional Indian ones like the sitar, sarod, esraj, and violin. His innovative interpretations, which sometimes deviated from established notations and rhythms, drew criticism from traditionalists and Tagore music authorities.

By the late 1960s, some of his recordings were reportedly withdrawn from commercial circulation, with critics alleging that his interpretations diverged from accepted Tagorean musical standards. Despite this, he continued to perform live until he retired from singing in 1971 due to chronic asthma.

His autobiography, Bratya Janer Ruddha Sangit (The Stifled Music of an Outcast), published in 1979, offers a personal account of his musical philosophy and the controversies he faced. He died on 18 August 1980.
