= Supriya Devi =

Indian actress (1933–2018)

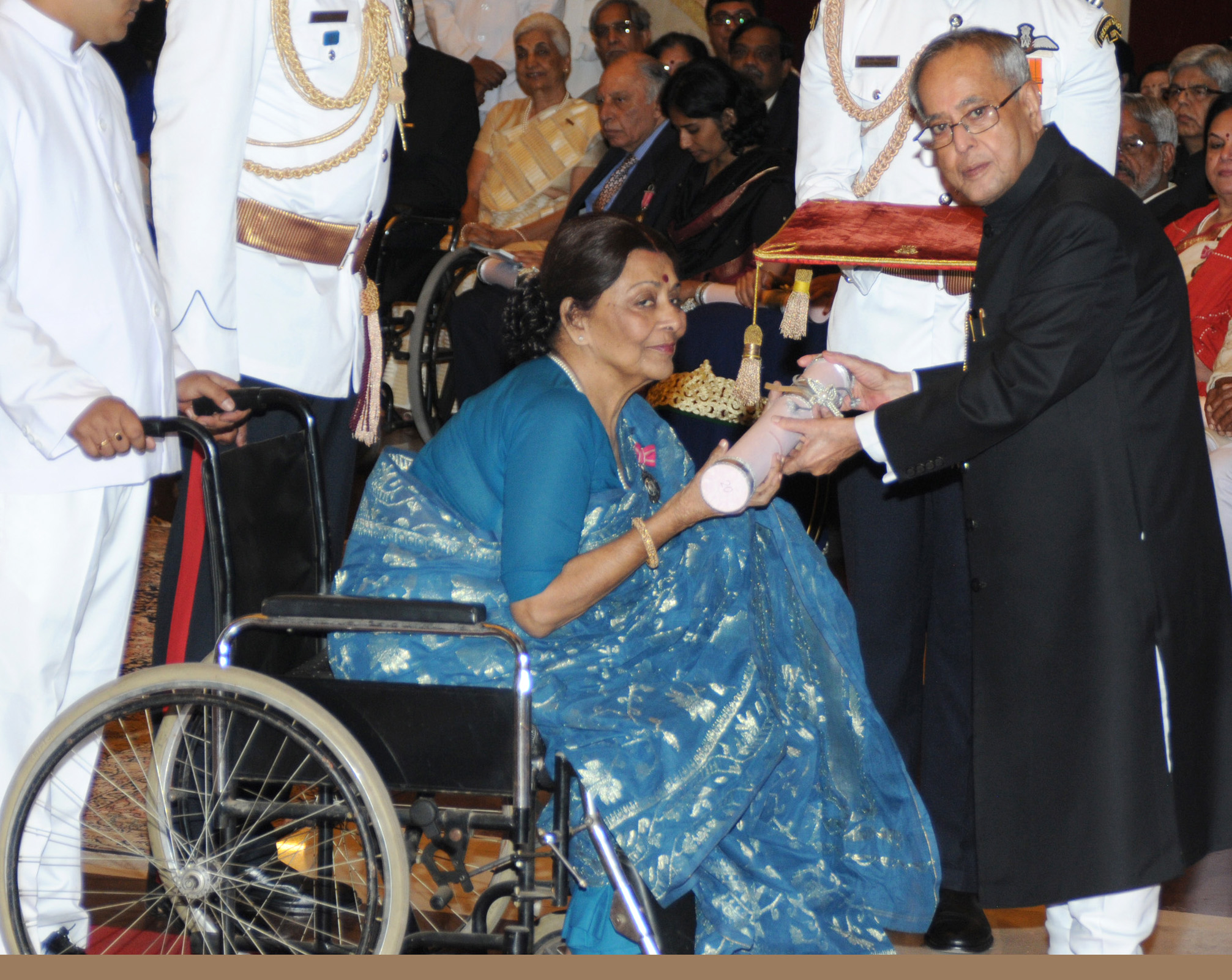
- Devi receiving Padma Shri Award from Pranab Mukherjee
- Born: Krishna Banerjee; 8 January 1933; Myitkyina, Burma, British India (now Myanmar)
- Died: 26 January 2018 (aged 85); Ballygunge, Kolkata, India
- Other name: Supriya Choudhury
- Occupation: Actress
- Years active: 1952; 1958–2018
- Notable work: Amrapali; Meghe Dhaka Tara; Shuno Baranari; Komal Gandhar; Swaralipi; Teen Adhyay; Sanyasi Raja; Sister
- Spouses: Biswanath Chowdhury (m. 1954; div. 1958) Uttam Kumar (m. 1963–1980)
- Relatives: Sean Banerjee (grandson)
- Awards: Padma Shri; Banga-Vibhushan; Filmfare Award; BFJA Awards

Supriya Devi (Supriya Choudhury; 8 January 1933 – 26 January 2018) was an Indian actress who is known for her work in Bengali cinema for more than 50 years. She is best known for her portrayal of Neeta in Ritwik Ghatak's Bengali film Meghe Dhaka Tara (1960). She won the Filmfare Award and the BFJA Award twice. In 2011, she received the Banga-Vibhushan, West Bengal's highest civilian honour, followed in 2014 by the Padma Shri—India's fourth-highest civilian award—for her contributions to the entertainment industry.

She made her debut alongside Uttam Kumar in Basu Paribar (1952), under the direction of Nirmal Dey, and successively appeared in Prarthana (1952) directed by Pranab Ray. However, IMDb lists 1951 Hindi film Shokhiyan as her first film. She, then took a hiatus and returned to filmdom in Marmabani (1958). She rose to prominence after she had appeared in the Uttam Kumar blockbuster Sonar Harin (1959). At the beginning of the 1960s, she came to wider notice for her successive roles in films such as Meghe Dhaka Tara (1960), Shuno Baranari (1960), Komal Gandhar (1961), Swaralipi (1961), Agnisanskar (1961) and others. She made her Bollywood debut opposite Dharmendra in Begaana (1963).

== Early life ==
Supriya was born in Myitkyina, Burma. Her father was Gopal Chandra Banerjee, a lawyer from Faridpur (now in Bangladesh). During World War II, her family moved to Calcutta (present-day Kolkata, India).

Supriya was seven years old when she made her acting debut in two plays directed by her father. She was a dancer since her childhood, even receiving an award from Thakin Nu, then-Prime Minister of Burma, who was moved by one of her dance recitals. From her childhood, her closest friend was Nihar Dutta, who married into the Guha Thakurata family and as Nihar Guha Thakurata, was an eminent Burmese social worker of her time.

In 1948, the Bannerjees left Burma for good and re-settled in Calcutta. They had been refugees in 1942 when the Japanese forces occupied Burma. The young Supriya and her family were forced to undertake an arduous trek on foot to the safety of Calcutta.

== Career ==
In Calcutta, she resumed her dance lessons and trained under Guru Muruthappan Pillai and later under Guru Prahlad Das. Supriya and her family were on friendly terms with Chandrabati Devi who was their neighbour. It was through Chandrabati Devi's inspiration and contacts that Supriya Choudhury stepped into the world of Bengali films.

She made her debut in the Uttam Kumar, who was a childhood friend of her youngest brother, starrer Basu Paribar (1952) under the direction of Nirmal Dey and successively appeared in Prarthana (1952) directed by Pranab Ray and Shyamali (1952) directed by Binoy Bandyopadhyay. She, then took a hiatus and returned to filmdom in Marmabani (1958) under Sushil Majumdar's direction. She rose to prominence after she had appeared in the Uttam Kumar starrer blockbuster Sonar Harin (1959) directed by Mangal Chakraborty.

She rose to higher prominence after she had played the role of Amrapali in Amrapali (1959) directed by Sree Tarashankar and produced by Nalanda Films. Vyjayanthimala who was later found to play the same titular role was full of praise for her performance in the film.

At the beginning of the 1960s, she came to a bigger attention for her successive roles in films such as Meghe Dhaka Tara (1960), Shuno Baranari (1960), Komal Gandhar (1961), Swaralipi (1961) to name a few. She made her Bollywood debut opposite Dharmendra in Begaana (1963) under Sadashiv Rao Kavi's direction. She was applauded for her performance in the 1973 blockbuster Sanyasi Raja.

She was applauded for her performance in Raja Sen's National Award winning Bengali film Atmiyo Swajan (1998). Rediff described her performance in the film as "a fairly good fleshing out Supriya Devi".

== Personal life ==
In 1954, Supriya married Bishwanath Choudhury and a few years later her only daughter Soma was born. The couple divorced in 1958. She retired from films for a while during this period.

In 1963 she married Uttam Kumar. She lived with him until his death in 1980.

Supriya Devi died of a heart attack in Kolkata on 26 January 2018, aged 85.

== Filmography ==
1. The Namesake (2006) as Ashima's Grandmother
2. Arjun Aamar Naam (2003)
3. Ekti Nadir Naam (2002)
4. Shesh Thikana (2000) as Sriradha's grandmother
5. Atmiya Swajan (1998)
6. Honeymoon (1992)
7. Kari Diye Kinlam
8. Iman Kalyan (1982)
9. Kalankini Kankabati (1981)
10. Uttar Meleni (1981)
11. Dui Prithibi (1980)
12. Debdas (1979) as Chandramukhi
13. Bahnisikha
14. Dui Purush (1978) as Bimala
15. Sandhya Raag (1977)
16. Sabyasachi (film) (1977)
17. Sanyasi Raja (1975)
18. Bhola Moira
19. Sister
20. Jadi Jantem (1974) as Sujata
21. Bagh Bondi Khela (1975)
22. Raktatilak (1975) as Binata
23. Bon Palashir Padabali (1973) as Padma
24. Andha Atit (1972)
25. Chhinnapatra
26. Bilambita Loy (1970)
27. Duti Mon (1969)
28. Chiradiner (1969)
29. Mon Niye (1969)
30. Sabarmati (1969) Hiren Nag Chhaya Debi
31. Jiban Mrityu
32. Chowringhee (1968) as Karabi Guha
33. Teen Adhayay (1968)
34. Kal Tumi Aleya (1966) as Dr. Labanya Sarkar
35. Shudhu Ekti Bachhar (1966)
36. Aap Ki Parchhaiyan (1964) as Asha in Hindi Movie
37. Door Gagan Ki Chhaon Mein (1964) as Meera
38. Nishithe
39. Lal Pathore (1964)
40. Begaana (1963)
41. Surya Sikha (1963)
42. Uttarayan (1963)
43. Swaralipi
44. Komal Gandhar (1961) as Anasuya
45. Madhya Rater Tara (1961)
46. Meghe Dhaka Tara (1960) as Nita
47. Natun Fasal (1960)
48. Suno Baranari (1960)
49. Khelaghar (1959)
50. Sonar Harin (1959)
51. Amrapali
52. Basu Paribar (1952) as Sukhen's Sister

== Awards ==
- Won- Filmfare Awards East-Best Actress Award for Sister in 1977.
- Won- Filmfare Awards East- Lifetime Achievement Award
- Won- Padmashri-the fourth highest civilian award for her contribution to Indian Cinema.
- Won- Banga-Vibhushan - the highest civilian award in West Bengal in 2011.
- Won- BFJA Award-Best Actress Award for "Tin Adhay" in 1969.
- Won- BFJA Award-Best Supporting Actress Award for "Chhinnapatra" in 1973.
- Won- Kalakar Awards-Lifetime Achievement Award in 2001.

== Book ==
Amar Jiban Amar Uttam. (Autobiography, Memoir)
