= Meghe Dhaka Tara (1960 film) =

1960 Indian film by Ritwik Ghatak

- A poster for Meghe Dhaka Tara
- Directed by: Ritwik Ghatak
- Written by: Ritwik Ghatak (screenplay), Shaktipada Rajguru (the original novel)
- Produced by: Chitrakalpa
- Starring: Supriya Choudhury, Anil Chatterjee, Niranjan Ray, Gita Ghatak, Bijon Bhattacharya, Gita Dey, Dwiju Bhawal, Gyanesh Mukherjee, Ranen Ray Choudhury
- Cinematography: Dinen Gupta
- Edited by: Ramesh Joshi
- Music by: Composer: Jyotirindra Moitra; Assistant: Anil Chandra Sengupta
- Release date: 14 April 1960
- Running time: 127 minutes
- Country: India
- Language: Bengali

Meghe Dhaka Tara (Bengali: মেঘে ঢাকা তারা Mēghē Ḍhākā Tārā, lit. The Cloud-Capped Star) is a 1960 film written and directed by Ritwik Ghatak, based on a social novel by Shaktipada Rajguru with the same title. It stars Supriya Choudhury, Anil Chatterjee, Gita Dey, Bijon Bhattacharya, Niranjan Roy, and Gyanesh Mukherjee. It was part of a trilogy consisting of Meghe Dhaka Tara (1960), Komal Gandhar (1961), and Subarnarekha (1962), all dealing with the aftermath of the Partition of Bengal during the Partition of India in 1947 and the refugees coping with it.

== Plot ==
The film revolves around Nita (played by Supriya Choudhury), a young girl who lives with her family, refugees from East Pakistan, in the suburbs of Calcutta. Nita is a self-sacrificing person who is constantly exploited by everyone around her, even her own family, who take her goodness for granted. Her father, who had had an accident, is unable to make a living. Her elder brother Shankar (played by Anil Chatterjee) believes that his craft (singing) needs to be perfected before he can make any income from it and therefore the burden of taking care of the family falls on Nita. Her life is ridden with personal tragedy: her lover Sanat leaves her for her sister Geeta, her younger brother is injured while working in a factory and finally she herself becomes a burden to her family when she contracts tuberculosis. Her mostly absent would-be singer brother is the only person who cares about her in the end. At the end of the film, she screams out her agony, throwing herself into her brother's arms . With her dying breaths, she utters her last words: "Elder Brother, I want to live (দাদা,আমি বাঁচতে চাই!)."

== Cast ==
- Supriya Choudhury as Nita
- Anil Chatterjee as Shankar (brother)
- Gyanesh Mukherjee as Banshi Dutta (seller)
- Bijon Bhattacharya as Taran (the father)
- Gita Dey as Mother
- Gita Ghatak as Gita (sister)
- Dwiju Bhawal as Mantu (younger brother)
- Niranjan Ray as Sanat

== Production ==
This film was directed by independent filmmaker Ritwik Ghatak in Kolkata (then Calcutta). In contrast to many Bollywood films made in Mumbai, India's main film center, Ghatak's films are formally elaborate and somber, and often address issues related to the Partition of India. Although Partition is never explicitly mentioned in Meghe Dhaka Tara, the film takes place in a refugee camp in the outskirts of Calcutta, and concerns an impoverished genteel Hindu bhadralok family and the problems they face because of Partition.

The film is perhaps the most widely viewed film among Ghatak's works; it was his greatest commercial success at home, and coincided with an international film movement towards personal stories and innovative techniques (the so-called 'new wave'). After Ghatak's death, his work (and this film in particular) began to attract a more sizable global audience, via film festivals and the subsequent release of DVDs both in India and in Europe.

Meghe Dhaka Tara is strongly melodramatic in tone, especially as concerns the sufferings heaped on the protagonist. As in many of his other films, Ghatak also uses surrealistic sound effects, such as sounds of a lashing as the heroine suffers yet another tragic twist of fate.

=== Music ===
Jyotirindra Moitra composed the film score. He used classical Indian musical forms and included a song by Rabindranath Tagore, sung to Nita by her brother, Shankar. Moitra also wrote the film music for Ritwik Ghatak's Komalgandhar.

== Credits ==
- Story: Shaktipada Rajguru
- Screenplay: Ritwik Ghatak
- Cinematography: Dinen Gupta
- Assistant: Soumendu Ray, Sunil Chakraborty, Sukhendu Dasgupta, Krishnadhan Chakraborty, Shankar Guha, Mahendra Kumar, Agnu
- Editing: Ramesh Joshi
- Assistant: Gobinda Chattopadhay, Punu Sen
- Sound: Satyen Chatterjee
- Art Direction: Rabi Chatterjee
- Music: Music Director:Jyotirindra Moitra
  Assistant(s):
  Ustad Bahadur Khan
- Production: Chitrakalpa

== Reception ==
=== Ghatak on the film ===
The title 'Meghe Dhaka Tara' was given by me, original story was published in a popular newspaper by the name of 'Chenamukh'. Something in this story stirred me. And that is why Shakespeare's 'The Cloud Capped Star' struck my mind and I decided to pen a new script all together. It could be a bit sentimental, but to throw overtones out of it came to mind gradually. Here I made use of Indian mythology which is a part of my life. 'Meghe Dhaka Tara' expressed my thoughts.

=== Screening of Meghe Dhaka Tara in different festivals ===
- 1968: Ritwik Film Festival by Calcutta Cine Institute
- 1968: Ritwik Film Festival by Jadavpur University
- 1974: Ritwik Film Festival by Bengali club of Delhi
- 1976: Ritwik Ghatak Retrospective at Society Theatre by Federation of Film Society
- 1978: International Film Festival, Madras (Chennai)
- 1982: Ritwik Film Festival by London film and Theatre Festival
- 1983: Ritwik Film Festival, France
- 1985: Ritwik Ghatak Retrospective at India International Centre, Delhi
- 1985: 25 anniversary by Ritwik Memorial Trust at the Nandan
- 1985: Festival of India Celebration, US
- 1986: Major Retrospective of Indian Cinema, Lisbon, Portugal
- 1987: Film section of Festival of India, Switzerland
- 1987: Festival of India in Japan
- 1987: Celebrating Ghatak's birthday at Nandan celebration
- 1987: Ritwik Festival by the Bombay Screen Unit
- 1988: Ritwik Festival at Gorky Sadan jointly organised by Ritwik Memorial Trust and Eisenstein Cine Club, Calcutta
- 1990: Ritwik Retrospective at Rotterdam Film Festival, Netherlands
- 1990: Ritwik Retrospective organised by Chennai Film Society, Madras
- 1990: Locarno Film Festival, Locarno, Switzerland
- 1991: Ritwik Film Festival, Zürich, Switzerland
- 1992: Film Festival titled 'Amader Bhalobasar Ritwik' at Ganabhaban, organised by Uttarapara Cine Club
- 1997: New York film festival
- 1998: Part of 'Classic Film Classic Directors' category', Calcutta International Film Festival
- 1999: Best Masterpiece Film, Pusan Film Festival, South Korea
- 1999: Barcelona, Madrid, Spain
- 2006: Jeonju International Film Festival, South Korea
- 2012: Toronto International Film Festival, Canada
- 2012: Kolar Hills Film Festival, Bangalore (Bettadalli Ghatak: A Festival of Ritwik Ghatak's Films)
- 2012: 10th Pune International Film Festival, Pune
- 2017: Ritwik Ghatak Retrospective UK, at Dundee Contemporary Arts, Dundee, Scotland, UK, Programme curated by Sanghita Sen, Department of Film Studies, St Andrews University, UK

== Legacy ==
=== Accolades ===
In 2012, Meghe Dhaka Tara was ranked at #235 and #322 on the Sight & Sound's critics' and directors' poll of "The Greatest Films of All Time" respectively. In 2022, it was ranked #152 on the Sight & Sound's critics' poll of "The Greatest Films of All Time." The movie is also listed in the book 1001 Movies You Must See Before You Die, which praises "the grace of Ghatak's mise en scène, his expressionist sound design, and the enormous sense of loss."

== Releases ==
=== The Criterion Collection ===
The Criterion Collection released the latest and definitive restoration of the film on Blu-ray, DVD, and on their streaming platform the Criterion Channel in 2019.

=== Adaptations ===
In 2016, Bratya Basu made a Bengali drama based on the plot of this film. The drama was first staged on 2 January 2016 at University Institute Hall at Kolkata.

== See also ==
- List of works of Ritwik Ghatak
- Dhaka University Film Society
