= List of works by Sreelekha Mitra =

Sreelekha Mitra filmography
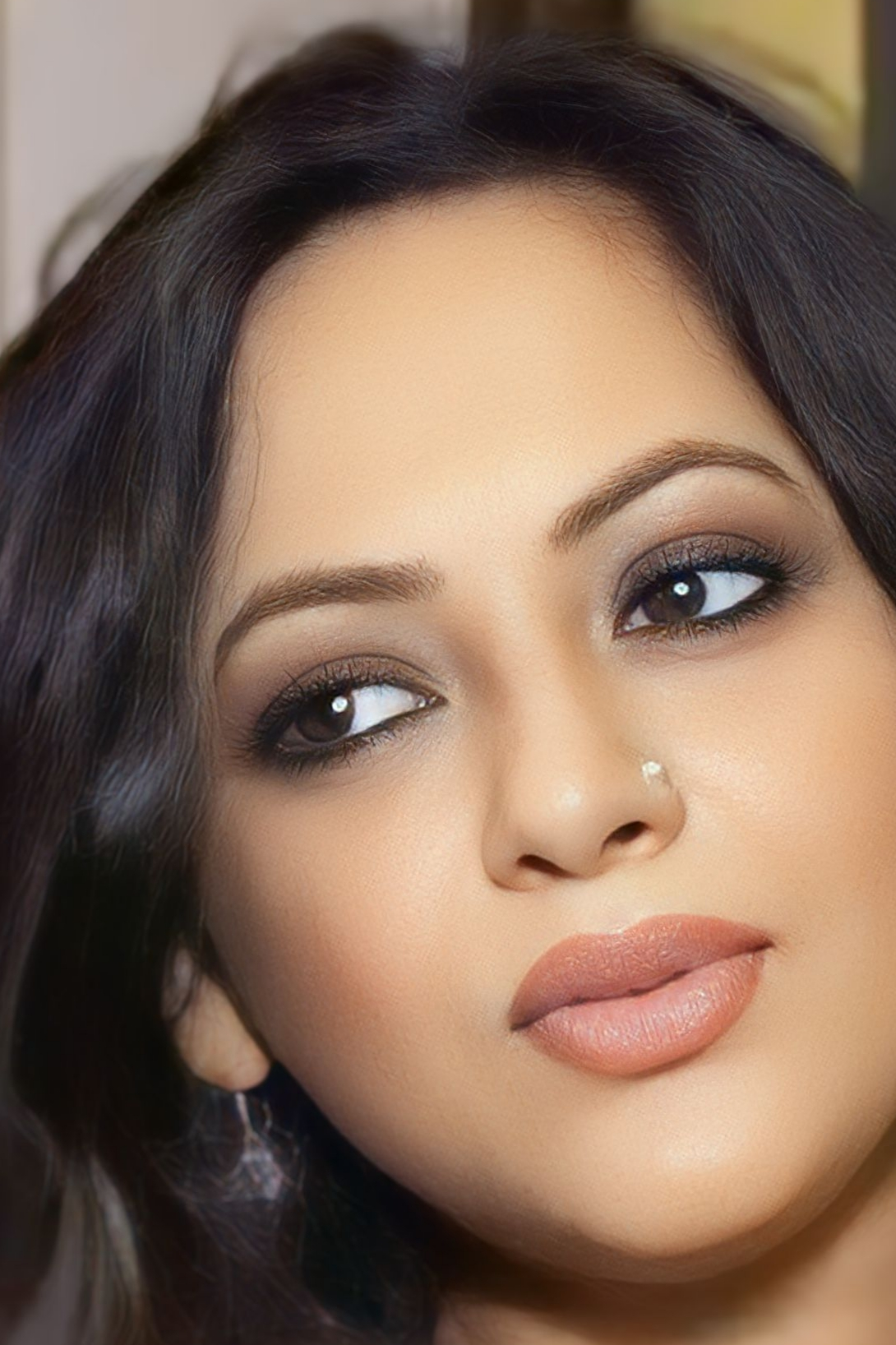
- Mitra in 2017
- Film: 50+
- Television series: 20+
- Web series: 2
- Television show: 1

Sreelekha Mitra is an Indian actress who is known for her work in Bengali cinema and television. Her first Acting stint was Balikar Prem, a Bengali TV series by Dulal Lahiri. She then appeared in two odia films but those did not take off her career. After she bagged the role of Nabanita in Trishna (1996), a Bengali TV series directed by Anindya Sarkar, she went on to appear in a string of Bengali TV series and films.

Mitra starred in Basu Chatterjee's Hothat Brishti (1998) which became a major commercial success. She did not experience a significant elevation in her career as she did not reciprocate to Prosenjit Chatterjee's love for her.

== Short films ==
Key
| † | Denotes films that have not yet been released |

| Year | Title | Role | Direction | Acting | Note | Ref. |
|---|---|---|---|---|---|---|
| 2000 | Y2K | | | Yes | | |
| 2020 | 12 Seconds | Sreejita | | Yes | | |
| 2022 | Ebong Chad | | Yes | Yes | Bagged two awards at the Kolaj Bengaluru Bengali Film Festival | |
| | Locked † | | | Yes | | |
| | Ebong Barandah † | | Yes | | | |

== Feature films ==
Key
| † | Denotes films that have not yet been released |

=== Hindi films ===
| Year | Title | Role | Note | Ref. |
|---|---|---|---|---|
| 2016 | Ardhangini Ek Ardhsatya | Bimala | | |
| TBA | Nyaya — A Judgement Day † | | | |

=== Bengali films ===
| Year | Title | Role | Note | Ref. |
|---|---|---|---|---|
| 1996 | Sei Raat | | | |
| 1997 | Joyee | | | |
| 1997 | Samadhan | | | |
| 1997 | Saptami | | | |
| 1997 | Sriman Bhootnath | | | |
| 1998 | Aamar Maa | | | |
| 1998 | Baba Keno Chakor | | | |
| 1998 | Hothat Brishti | | | |
| 1998 | Maayer Dibyi | | | |
| 1998 | Nag Nagini | | | |
| 1998 | Nayaner Alo | | | |
| 1998 | Sagar Banya | | | |
| 1998 | Singha Purush | | | |
| 1999 | Ding Dong | | | |
| 1999 | Khelaghar | | | |
| 1999 | Krishna Kaberi | | | |
| 1999 | Madhu Malati | Debi | | |
| 1999 | Sankha Sindurer Dibbi | | | |
| 2000 | Aamader Sansar | | | |
| 2000 | Apan Holo Par | | | |
| 2000 | Gariber Samman | | | |
| 2000 | Satbhai | | | |
| 2001 | Jabab Chai | | | |
| 2002 | Annadata | | | |
| 2002 | Tak Misti Jiban | | | |
| 2003 | Mando Meyer Upakshan | | | |
| 2004 | Debdoot | | | |
| 2004 | Teen Ekke Teen | | | |
| 2005 | Jonmodin | | | |
| 2006 | Kantatar | | | |
| 2008 | Antarotamo | | | |
| 2008 | Hello Kolkata | | | |
| 2008 | Tolly Lights | | | |
| 2008 | Tumi Robe Nirobe | | | |
| 2009 | Houseful | | Cameo | |
| 2009 | Smritimedur | | | |
| 2010 | Mahanagar@Kolkata | Kamalinee | | |
| 2010 | Ogo Bodhu Sundari | | | |
| 2010 | Soldier | | | |
| 2011 | Bhorer Pakhi | | | |
| 2011 | Kalidas o Chemistry | Renu | | |
| 2011 | Katakuti | | | |
| 2011 | Seven Days | | | |
| 2011 | Uro Chithi | Raka | | |
| 2012 | Bhooter Bhobishyot | | Cameo | |
| 2012 | Ebong Bisarjan | | | |
| 2013 | Aschorjo Prodip | | | |
| 2013 | Bandhu Sundar | | | |
| 2013 | Shantiniketane | | | |
| 2014 | Chaar | | | |
| 2014 | Jijibisha | | | |
| 2014 | Pendulum | | | |
| 2015 | Chitrahar @ Cinema Noy Ganema | | | |
| 2015 | Choukaath | | | |
| 2015 | Kadambari | Binodini Dasi | | |
| 2015 | Maayer Biye | | | |
| 2015 | Swade Ahlade | | | |
| 2016 | Raater Atithi | | | |
| 2016 | Virus | | | |
| 2017 | AranyaDeb | | | |
| 2017 | Kichu Na Bola Katha | | | |
| 2018 | Nirbhoya | | | |
| 2018 | Rainbow Jelly | Pori Pishi | | |
| 2018 | Aranyadeb | Rini | | |
| 2019 | Bhalo Maye Kharap Maye | | | |
| 2019 | Sweater | | | |
| 2020 | Borunbabur Bondhu | | | |
| 2020 | Sudakshinar Saree | | | |
| 2021 | Nirbhaya | | | |
| 2021 | Avijatrik | Ranu | | |
| 2021 | Once Upon a Time in Calcutta | Ela | | |
| 2022 | Tritiyo Purush | | | |
| 2022 | Bhoote Biswas Koren | Rusha | | |
| 2024 | Pariah | | | |
| 2024 | Kolkata Diaries | Anamika Saha | | |
| 2025 | Sunetra Sundaram | | | |
| 2026 | Chobiwala | | Cameo | |
| 2026 | Bhootu Aya Bhago | | | |
| TBA | Mir Jafar : Chapter 2 † | | | |
| TBA | Fair and Ugly † | | | |
| TBA | Tari † | | | |
| TBA | Anumaner Bhittite † | Indrani | | |

=== Malayalam film ===
| Year | Title | Role | Note | Ref. |
|---|---|---|---|---|
| 2004 | Akale | Kamala | | |

=== Odia films ===
| Year | Title | Role | Note | Ref. |
|---|---|---|---|---|
| 1999 | Sasu Hata Kadi Bhauja Bedi | | | |
| 2001 | Kala Manika | | | |
| 2007 | Chaka Chaka Bhaunri | Sonali | | |

== Telefilms ==
=== Hindi telefilm ===
| Year | Title | Role | Note | Ref. |
|---|---|---|---|---|
| | Bhor | Asim's ex-girlfriend | | |

=== Bengali telefilm ===
| Year | Title | Role | Note | Ref. |
|---|---|---|---|---|
| | Dicharinee | | | |
| | Raja Opera | | | |
| | Tin Satyi | | | |
| | Abhinetri | | | |
| | Dui Purush | | | |
| | Tin Purush | | | |
| | Ami Shey O Anu | | | |
| 2008 | Mon | Katha | | |
| 2018 | Darjeelinge Bhalobasa | | | |

== TV series ==
| Year | Title | Season | Role | Direction | Note | Ref. |
|---|---|---|---|---|---|---|
| 1993 | Balikar Prem | | | | | |
| 1996 | Trishna | | Nabanita | | | |
| 1999 | Draupadi | | Chitrāngadā | | | |
| 1999 | Ei Norodeho | | | | | |
| 2002 | Pratibimba | | Ranja | | | |
| | Ei to Jibon | | Shreya | | | |
| 2004 | Devdas | | Chandramukhi | | Comprises five episodes. A part of Sahityer Sera Samay | |
| | Prabahini-E-Samay | | | | | |
| | Bhanga Gorar Khela | | | | | |
| 2009 | Bandhan | | Aparna | | | |
| 2017 | Dhimaner Din Kaal | | | | | |
| 2019 | Oddbhururey | | | | | |
| 2020 | Beder Meye Jotsna | | Khokkoshi Rani | | Cameo | |
| 2021 | Rudrabinar Obhishaap | 1 | Madhubanti | | | |
| 2022 | Rudrabinar Obhishaap | 2 | Madhubanti | | | |
| 2023 | Kaala | 1 | Paromita Mukherjee | | | |
| | Summer of '77 — Children of Freedom | | | | | |
| TBA | Paan Supari † | | | Yes | | |

== Reality show ==
| Year | Title | Season | Judge | Note | Ref. |
|---|---|---|---|---|---|
| 2007 | Mirakkel Akkel Challenger 2 | 2 | Yes | | |
| 2008 | Mirakkel Bare Miya Chhote Miya | 3 | Yes | | |
| 2010 | Mirakkel Akkel Challenger 5 | 5 | Yes | | |
| 2011 | Mirakkel Akkel Challenger 6 | 6 | Yes | | |
| 2012 | Mirakkel Akkel Challenger 6 : Awesomesala | 7 | Yes | | |
| 2013 | Mirakkel Akkel Challenger 7 | 8 | Yes | | |
| 2014 | Mirakkel Akkel Challenger 8 | 9 | Yes | | |
| 2015—2016 | Mirakkel Akkel Challenger 9 | 10 | Yes | | |
