= Anandalok Puraskar =

Award ceremony for Bengali film in India

- Awarded for: Best in Bengali cinema
- Country: India
- Presented by: Anandalok Magazine
- First award: 1998

The Anandalok Puraskar, or Anandalok Awards, ceremony is an award ceremony for Bengali film in India. Bengali language film magazine Anandalok, published by Ananda Publishers and Ananda Bazar Patrika, presents the award (Puraskar). The magazine was launched on 25 January 1975 and the awards ceremony started in 1998.

== Awards ==
- Best Films
- Best Director
- Best Actor
- Best Actress
- Best Actor (Critics)
- Best Actress (Critics)
- Best Supporting Actor
- Best Supporting Actress
- Best Screenplay
- Best Cinematographer
- Best Art Director
- Best Editor
- Best Music Director
- Best Lyricist
- Best Male Playback
- Best Female Playback
- Best Make Up Man
- Most Promising Director
- Most Promising Actor
- Most Promising Actress
- Best Action Hero

=== Hindi section ===
- Anandalok Award for Best Actor (Hindi)
- Anandalok Award for Best Actress (Hindi)
- Anandalok Award for Best Film (Hindi)

== Previous awards ==
=== 2025 ===
- Life time achievement award – Biswajit Chatterjee
- Best Film (Critics Choice) – Chalchitra Ekhon and Beline
- Best Director – Raj Chakraborty for Shontaan
- Best Director (Critics Choice) – Srijit Mukherji for Padatik
- Best Actress (Popular Choice) - Koushani Mukherjee for Bohurupi and Subhashree Ganguly for Babli
- Best Actress (Critics Choice) – Monami Ghosh for Padatik
- Best Actor (Critics Choice) – Chandan Sen for Manikbabur Megh
- Best Actor (Popular Choice) - Dev for Khadaan
- Best Supporting Actor - Ritwick Chakraborty for Shontaan
- Best Supporting Actress - Subhashree Ganguly for Shontaan
- Best Debut ( Female) – Idhika Paul for Khadaan

=== 2012 ===
- Best Film - Muktodhara
- Best Director- Anik Dutta for Bhooter Bhabishyat
- Best Actor - Parambrata Chatterjee for Hemlock Society
- Best Actress - Swastika Mukherjee for Bhooter Bhabishyat
- Best Supporting Actor - Saswata Chatterjee for Bhooter Bhabishyat
- Best Supporting Actress - Mumtaz Sorcar for Bhooter Bhabishyat

=== 2010 ===
- Best Film – Le Chakka
- Best Director – Raj Chakraborty for Le Chakka
- Best Hindi Feature Film – Raajneeti
- Best Bengali Actor – Dev for Le Chakka
- Best Bengali Actress – Payel Sarkar for Le Chakka
- Best Debut (Male) – Joy Mukherjee for Target
- Best Debut (Female) – Barkha Sengupta for Dui Prithibi
- Best Music Director – Indradeep Dasgupta for Le Chakka
- Lifetime Achievement Award – Sharmila Tagore

=== 2009 ===
- Best Actress (Critics' Choice) – Rani Mukerji for Dil Bole Hadippa!
- Best Actor popular – Neil Nitin Mukesh for New York

=== 2008 ===
- Best Film – Chirodini Tumi Je Amar
- Best Director-Raj Chakraborty for Chirodini Tumi Je Amar
- Best Actor-Rahul Banerjee for Chirodini Tumi Je Amar
- Best Actress-Priyanka Sarkar for Chirodini Tumi Je Amar
- Best Music-Jeet Ganguly for Chirodini Tumi Je Amar
- Best Action Hero-Hiran Chatterjee for Nabab Nandini
- Best Actress (Hindi)- Prachi Desai for Rock On!!
Nominated for 2008
- Best Film
  - Chirodini Tumi Je Amar
  - Chalo Let's Go
  - Khela
  - Nabab Nandini
  - Kailashe Kelenkari
- Best Director
  - Haranath Chakraborty for Nabab Nandini
  - Raj Chakraborty for Chirodini Tumi Je Amar
  - Anjan Dutt for Chalo Let's Go
  - Sandip Ray for Kailashe Kelenkari
  - Arjun Chakraborty for Tolly Lights
  - Rituparno Ghosh for Khela
- Best Actor
  - Prosenjit for Khela
  - Sabyasachi Chakrabarty for Kailashe Kelenkari
  - Jisshu Sengupta for Bor Asbe Ekhuni
  - Rahul Banerjee for Chirodini Tumi Je Amar
  - Jeet for Krishnakanter Will
  - Dev for Premer Kahini
- Best Actress
  - Koyel Mullick for Nabab Nandini
  - Subhashree Ganguly for Bajimaat
  - Priyanka Sarkar for Chirodini Tumi Je Amar
  - Sreelekha Mitra for Tolly Lights
  - Rituparna Sengupta for Chander Bari
- Best Music
  - Jeet Ganguly for Chirodini Tumi Je Amar
  - Indradeep Dasgupta for Bor Asbe Ekhuni
  - Neel Dutt for Chalo Let's Go
  - Arundhuti Roychowdhury-Shibaji Chatterje for Chander Bari

=== 2007 ===
- Best Film – Minister Fatakeshto
- Best Music – Pritam Chakraborty
- Lifetime Achievement Award – Moushumi Chatterjee
- Best Action Hero – Anubhav Mohanty for Kalishankar
- Best Actor- Mithun Chakraborty for Minister Fatakesto
- Best Actress- Rituparna Sengupta for Anuranan
- Best Actress (Hindi)-Vidya Balan for Bhool Bhulaiyaa
- Best Debut- Subhashree Ganguly for Bajimaat

=== 2006 ===
- Best Cinematography – Abhik Mukhopadhyay for Dosar
- Best Director – Prabhat Roy for Shubhodrishti
- Best Film – Shubhodristi
- Best Music – Jeet Ganguly for Shubhodristi
- Best Playback Singer (Male) – Pranjal Bakshi for Bhalobasar Onek Naam
- Best Actor – Prosenjit Chatterjee for Dosar
- Best Actress – Sreelekha Mitra for Kantatar
- Best Upcoming Star (Female) – Koel Mallick for Shubhodrishti
- Best Upcoming Star (Male) – Jeet for Priyotama
- Best Villain – Rajatava Dutta for MLA Fatakeshto
- Best Actress (Bollywood) – Rani Mukerji for Black
- Best Actor (Bollywood) – Amitabh Bachchan for Black
- Best Film (Bollywood) – Black

=== 2005 ===
- Best Director – Rituparno Ghosh for Antarmahal
- Best Film – Antarmahal
- Best Playback Singer (Female) – Shreya Ghoshal for Manik
- Best Playback Singer (Male) – Sonu Nigam for Bandhan
- Best Actor – Jeet for Manik
- Best Actress – Debashree Roy for Tista
- Best TV Serial – Bohnishikha
- Best Telefilm – Palatak
- Best Makeover – Sudipta Chakraborty
- Most Promising Actor – Jeet for Bandhan
- Most Promising Actress – Koel Mallick for Bandhan
- Best Actress (Mega serial) – Indrani Halder for Bohnishikha
- Best Actor (Mega serial) – Saswata Chattopadhyay for Ekdin Pratidin
- Best Glamour Queen – Rituparna Sengupta
- Best Actress (Bollywood) – Rani Mukerji for Hum Tum
- Best Actor (Bollywood) – Abhishek Bachchan
- Best Film (Bollywood) – Veer-Zaara

=== 2004 ===
- Best Director: Anjan Das for Iti Srikanto
- Best Film : Aalo
- Best Action Hero: Jeet for Nater Guru
- Best Playback Singer (Female):Arundhati Holme Chowdhury for Aalo
- Best Playback Singer (Male):Babul Supriyo for Sangee
- Critics Choice :Koneenika Bandyopadhyay for Aabar Asibo Phire
- Lifetime Achievement Award : Ranjit Mallick
- Best Actor : Sabyasachi Chakrabarty for Bombayer Bombete
- Best Actor (Hindi): Saif Ali Khan
- Best Actress : Vidya Balan for Bhalo Theko
- Best Actress (Hindi): Preity Zinta for Kal Ho Naa Ho
- Best Director (Hindi) : Rajkumar Hirani for Munnabhai M.B.B.S.
- Best Film (Hindi) : Munnabhai M.B.B.S.
- Best Newcomer (Hindi) : Ashmit Patel for Murder

=== 2003 ===
- Best Director : Buddhadeb Dasgupta for Mando Meyer Upakshan
- Best Playback Singer (Female) :Swagatalakshmi Dasgupta for Chokher Bali
- Best Playback Singer (Male):Srikanta Acharya for Aamar Bhuban
- Critics Choice : Konkana Sen Sharma for Mr. and Mrs. Iyer
- Best Actor : Jeet for Sathi
- Best Actress: Aishwarya Rai for Chokher Bali
- Best Debut (Female): Rimi Sen for Hangama
- Best Debut (Male):Shahid Kapoor for Ishq Vishk
- Creator of the Most Outstanding Film of the Year: Rakesh Roshan for Koi... Mil Gaya
- Outstanding Music Director: Rajesh Roshan for Koi... Mil Gaya
- Outstanding Performance of the Year (Female): Kareena Kapoor for Main Prem Ki Diwani Hoon
- Outstanding Performance of the Year (Male): Hrithik Roshan for Koi... Mil Gaya

=== 2002 ===
- Best Film: Dekha
- Best Playback Singer (Female): Swagatalakshmi Dasgupta for Dekha
- Lifetime Achievement Award: Hema Malini
- Best Actor: Sabyasachi Chakrabarty for Ek Je Achhe Kanya
- Best Actress: Aparna Sen for Titlee
- Best Debut: Madhur Bhandarkar for Chandni Bar
- Editor's Choice: Dia Mirza and Vivek Oberoi

=== 2001 ===
- Lifetime Achievement Award- Sabitri Chattopadhyay & Shammi Kapoor
- Best Actor Mithun Chakraborty
- Best Actress Aparna Sen
- Editor's Choice Raveena Tandon

=== 2000 ===
- Best Screenplay Anjan Chowdhury Jiban Niye Khela
- Best Story Samaresh Majumdar Atmiyoswajan
- Lifetime Achievement Award Sunil Dutt
- Special Jury Award Indrani Dutta Swapno Niye
- Best Actress in a Supporting Role Rituparna Sengupta Atmiyoswajan
- Best Actor Soumitra Chatterjee AtmiyoswajanSoumitra Chatterjee Asukh
- Best Actress Indrani Haldar Anu
- Best Debut Shilajit Majumdar Asukh
- Editor's Choice Tabu Hu Tu Tu
- Voice of the Millennium Manna Dey

=== 1999 ===
- Best Art Direction = Rupchand Kundu Surya Kanya
- Best Cinematography Soumendu Roy Surya Kanya
- Best Director Biresh Chattopadhyay Surya Kanya
- Best Editing Arghakamal Mitra Dahan
- Best Film Dahan
- Best Lyrics Nachiketa Chakraborty Hathat Brishti
- Best Music Nachiketa Chakraborty Hathat Brishti
- Best Playback Singer (Female) Swagatalakshmi Dasgupta Surya KanyaSreeradha Bandhopadhaya Surya Kanya
- Best Playback Singer (Male) Kumar Sanu For Ami Sei Meye
- Best Screenplay Joy Mukherjee Sanghat
- Best Story Taposi Roychoudhury Surya Kanya
- Lifetime Achievement Award Tapan Sinha
- Special Jury Award Dolon Ray SanghatFirdous Ahmed Hathat Brishti
- Best Actor in a Supporting Role Manoj Mitra Hathat Brishti
- Best Actress in a Supporting Role Mamata Shankar Surya Kanya
- Best Actor Prasenjit Ranakshetra
- Best Actress Indrani Haldar DahanRituparna Sengupta Dahan
- Editor's Choice Jaya BachchanMithun Chakraborty
- Living Legend Rajesh Khanna
- Special Editor Award Jaya BachchanMithun Chakraborty

=== 1998 ===
- Best Art Direction Goutam Bose Moner Manush
- Best Cinematography Venu Lal Darja
- Best Director Buddhadeb Dasgupta Lal Darja
- Best Editing Oankar Bakri Gane Bhuban Bhoriye Debo
- Best Film Sedin Chaitramas
- Best Lyrics Jatileswar Mukhopadhyay DamuMohit Chottopadhayay Damu
- Best Music Jatileswar Mukhopadhyay DamuPartha Sengupta Damu
- Best Playback Singer (Female) Swagatalakshmi Dasgupta Sedin Chaitramas
- Best Playback Singer (Male) Kumar Sanu Gane Bhuban Bhoriye Debo
- Best Screenplay Mohit Chottopadhaya Damu
- Best Story Bimal Kar Nayantara
- Lifetime Achievement Award Dev AnandSoumitra Chatterjee
- Special Jury Award Rabi Ghosh NayantaraSaswata Chattopadhyay Nayantara
- Best Actor in a Supporting Role Ashad Lal Darja
- Best Actress in a Supporting Role Alokananda Ray Sedin Chaitramas
- Best Actor Subhendu Chattopadhyay Lal Darja
- Best ActressMamata Shankar Nayantara
