= Anandalok Best Female Playback Award =

Anandalok Puraskar or Anandalok Awards (Bengali: আনন্দলোক পুরস্কার) ceremony is one of the most prominent film events for Bengali Cinema in India. Anandalok, a film magazine in Bengali language, published from Ananda Publishers and Ananda Bazar Patrika, presents this award (Puraskar). The magazine was started on 25 January 1975 and the awards (Puraskar) ceremony started in 1998.

== Winners ==
Year	Winner	Film
1998	Swagatalakshmi Dasgupta	Sedin Chaitra Mas
1999	Swagatalakshmi Dasgupta; Sreeradha Banerjee (joint)	Surya Kanya
2002	Swagatalakshmi Dasgupta	Dekha
2004	Swagatalakshmi Dasgupta	Chokher Bali
2005	Shreya Ghoshal	Manik
2025	Antara Mitra; Srestha Das (joint)	Khadaan; Bohurupi

== Trivia ==
Swagatalakshmi Dashupta has been awarded 4 times in a row, a record for any category of Anandalok Awards. She won almost two thirds of all awards given (6) and also the most frequent recipient in this category.

== See also ==
- List of Asian television awards
