= Anandalok Best Films Award =

Here is a list of Anandalok Awards - Best Films Award, presented at the Anandalok Awards ceremony for Bengali-language films in India.

Year	Film	Director	Banner	Remarks/Note
2026	Once Upon a Time in Calcutta (মায়ানগর), Projapoti 2	Aditya Vikram Sengupta; Avijit Sen
2025	Chaalchitra Ekhon; Beyline	Anjan Dutt; Samik Roy Choudhury
2022	Abhijaan (2022 film)	Parambrata Chatterjee
2012	Muktodhara	Shiboprosad Mukherjee; Nandita Roy
2010	Le Chakka	Raj Chakraborty
2008	Chirodini Tumi Je Amar	Raj Chakraborty	Shree Venkatesh Films
2007	Minister Fatakesto	Swapan Saha	Shree Venkatesh Films
2006	Shubhodristi	Prabhat Roy	Shree Venkatesh Films
2005	Antarmahal	Rituparno Ghosh	ABCL
2004	Aalo	Tarun Majumdar
2003	Sathi	Haranath Chakraborty	Shree Venkatesh Films
2002	Dekha	Gautam Ghose
2001
2000
1999	Dahan	Rituparno Ghosh	Gee Pee Films Pvt. Ltd.
1998	Sedin Chaitramas	Prabhat Roy	New Cine Vision

== See also ==
- Anandalok Awards
- Tollywood Bangla
