= Tejendra Majumdar =

Indian sarod player (born 1961)

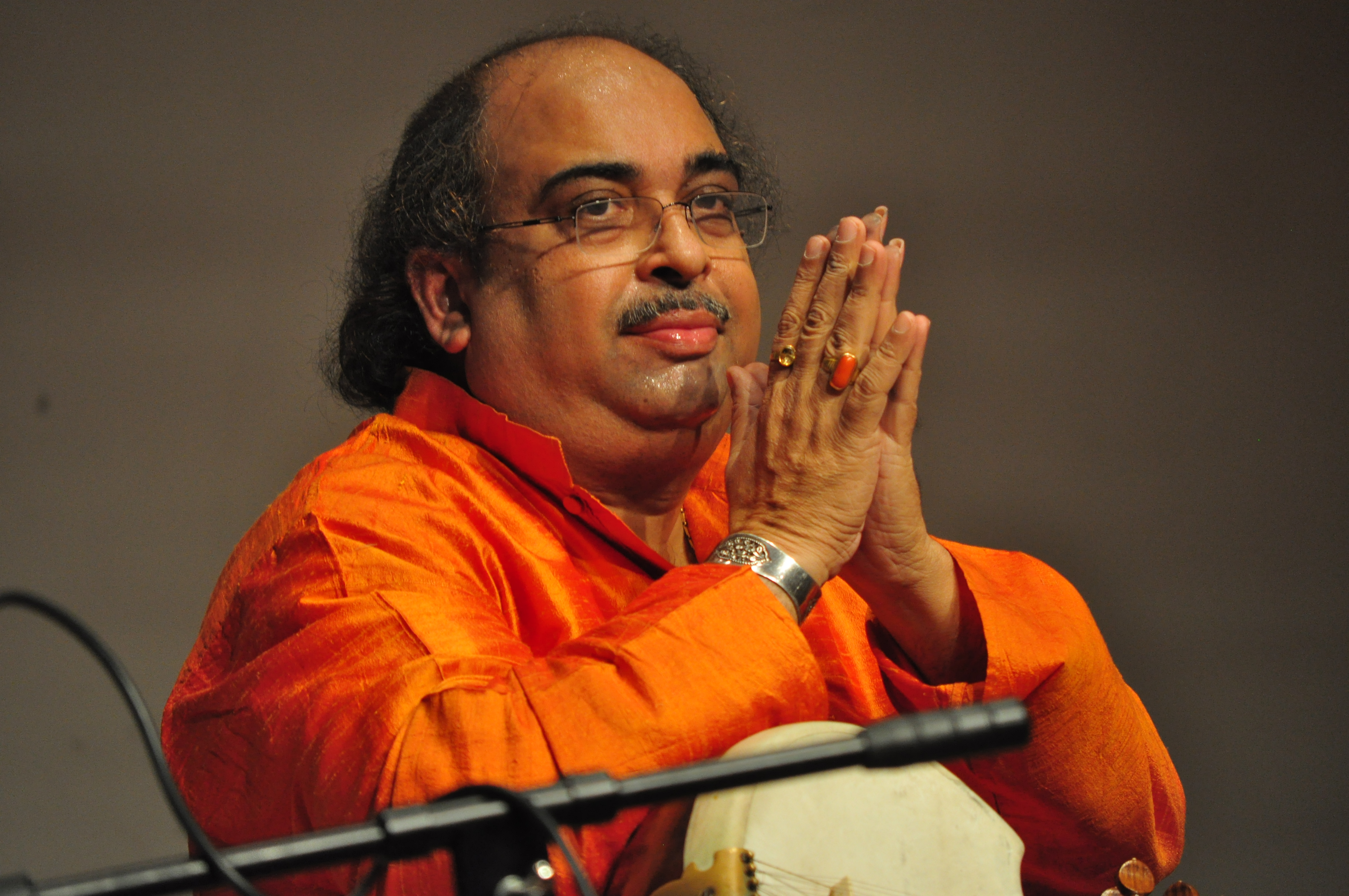
- Majumdar performing at Eastside Baha'i Center, Bellevue, Washington (2014)

Background information
- Born: Tejendra Narayan Majumdar; 17 May 1961 (age 65); India
- Genres: Hindustani classical music
- Instrument: Sarod
- Awards: ITC SRA (2017); Sangeet Natak Akademi (2018); Padma Shri (2025)

Tejendra Narayan Majumdar (born 17 May 1961) is an Indian sarod player known for his contributions to Hindustani classical music. A disciple of Bahadur Khan and Ali Akbar Khan, he is regarded as one of the prominent modern sarod exponents.

In 2025, he was conferred with the Padma Shri, India's fourth-highest civilian honour, by the Government of India for his contributions to the arts.

== Early life and training ==
Majumdar began his musical training under his grandfather Bibhuti Ranjan Majumdar. He later trained in vocal music and tabla under Amaresh Chowdhury and Anil Palit. He studied sarod with Bahadur Khan for 18 years, followed by advanced training under Ajay Sinha Roy and Ali Akbar Khan.

== Career ==
Majumdar is a regular performer at prestigious classical music festivals in India and abroad. His collaborations include jugalbandis with noted musicians such as Shujaat Khan. His rendering of raag Charukeshi in duet has been particularly acclaimed.

In February 2025, he performed at the 2025 Prayag Maha Kumbh Mela's Ganga Manch, Kalagram, alongside Tanmoy Bose, Pt. Akhilesh Gundecha, and Vidwan K. G. Prasad. He, along with Pandit Tanmoy Bose, presented a jugalbandi on a raga and tala created by Acharya Jayanta Bose, in the 60th birthday felicitation concert of Acharya Bose.

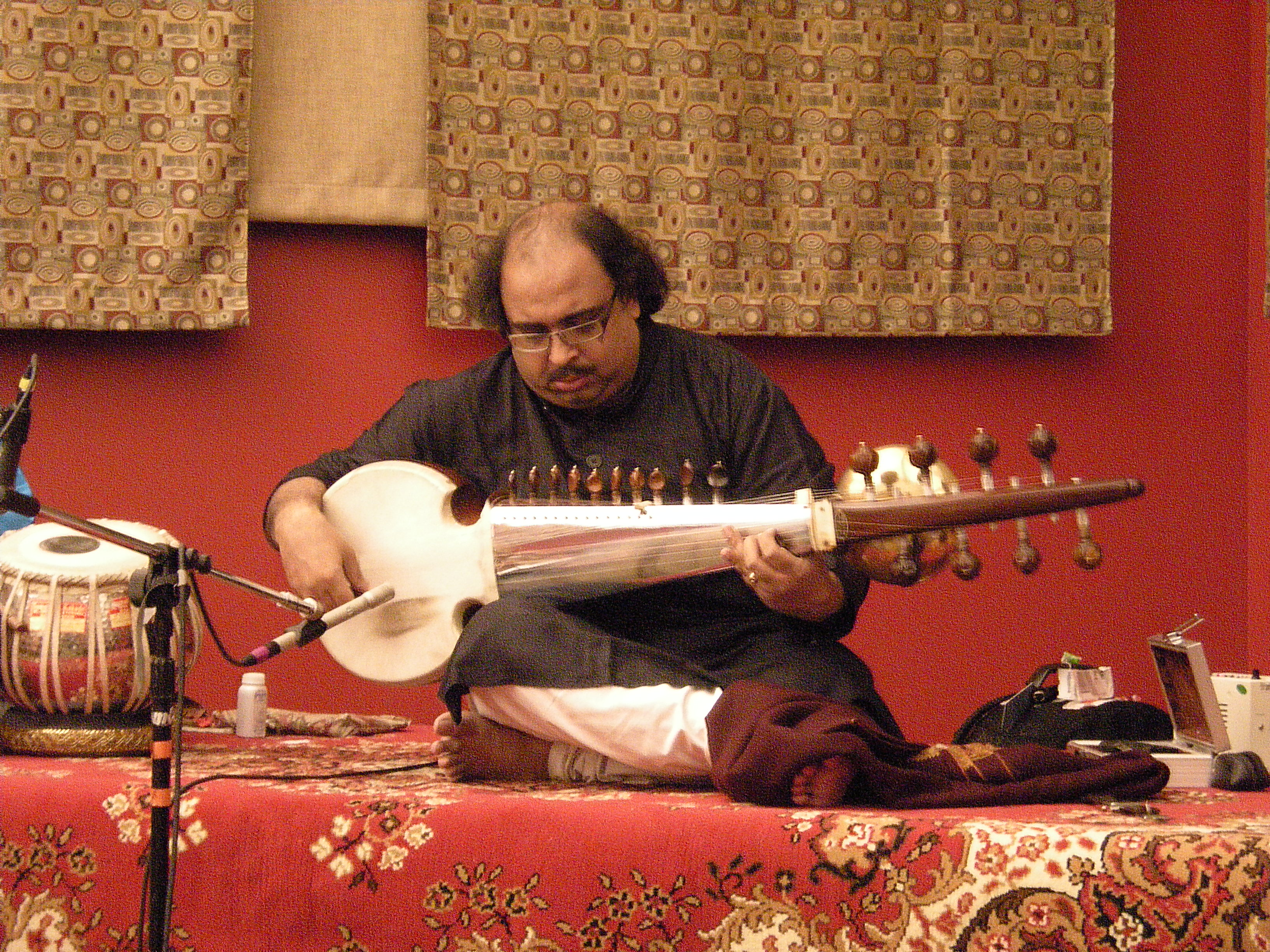
Tejendra Majumdar in concert at Spring Hall, Eastshore Unitarian Church, Bellevue, Washington as part of the Seattle-area Ragamala series

== Music direction ==
He composed music for the Bengali film Tollylights, directed by Arjun Chakraborty. He also directed music for Hanankaal, a Bengali film by Saibal Mitra.

== Awards and honours ==
- 1981 – First prize, All India Radio music competition; President’s Gold Medal; Pt. D. V. Paluskar award
- 2017 – ITC SRA Award
- 2018 – Sangeet Natak Akademi Award
- 2025 – Padma Shri

== Personal life ==
He is married to Manasi Majumdar, and they have a son, Indrayudh.
