= Sreelekha Mitra =

Indian Bengali actress

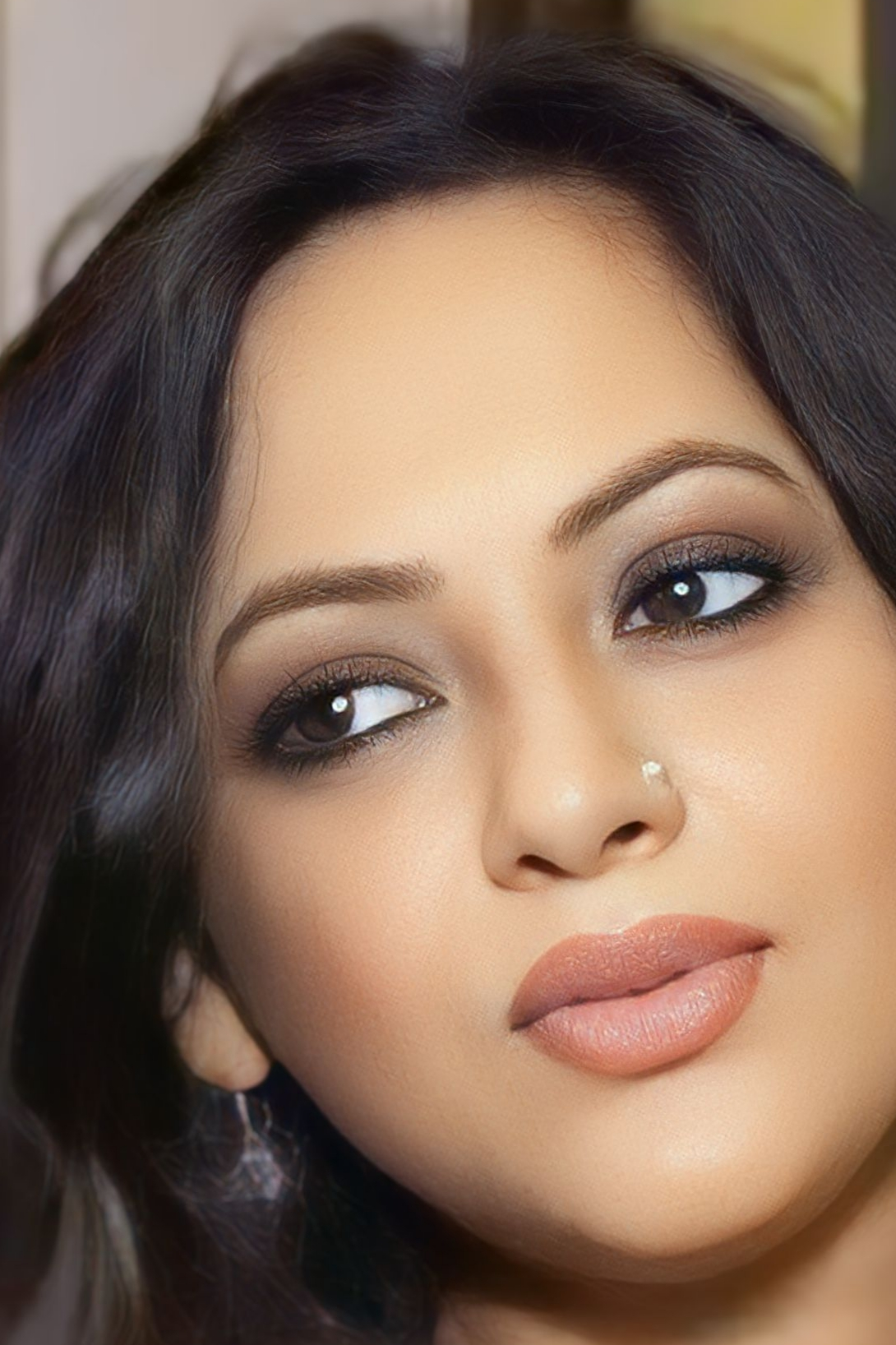
- Mitra in 2017
- Born: 30 August 1972 (age 54); Dum Dum, Calcutta, West Bengal, India
- Occupations: Actress, director, politician
- Years active: 1993–present
- Works: Full list
- Political party: Communist Party of India (Marxist)
- Spouse: Siladitya Sanyal (m. 2003; div. 2013)
- Children: 1
- Father: Santosh Mitra
- Awards: BFJA Award; Anandalok Award; Zee Bangla Gourav Samman
- Website: sreelekhamitra.com

Sreelekha Mitra (born 30 August 1972) is an Indian actress, director and politician who is known for her work in Bengali cinema and television. Winner of a BFJA Award and an Anandalok Award, Mitra is best known for her roles in films such as Hothat Brishti (1998), Kantatar (2006), Aschorjo Prodip (2013), Swade Ahlade (2015), Choukath (2015), Rainbow Jelly (2018) and Mayanagar (2021).

Her first acting assignment was Balikar Prem, a Bengali TV series directed by Dulal Lahiri. She rose to prominence for her role as Nabanita in the 1996 Bengali TV series Trishna directed by Anindya Sarkar. After she appeared in a host of films, her breakthrough role came with Basu Chatterjee's Hothat Brishti (1998) which was a major success at the box office. Despite the success of the film, Mitra never attained any significant elevation in her career which she claimed to be an undesirable consequence of Nepotism in Bengali cinema. She was conferred with BFJA Award and Anandalok Award for her role in Bappaditya Bandopadhyay's Kantatar (2006) where she essayed Sudha, an illegal immigrant who moves from one man to another and from one religion to another in quest of love. In 2011, she was awarded the Big Bangla Movie Award in The Best Actress in a Supporting Role category for her role in Mahanagar@Kolkata (2010), by Suman Mukhopadhyay. In 2012, she received the Zee Bangla Gourav Samman in the category of Best Supporting Actress for her role in Uro Chithi (2011). She was nominated for Filmfare Award and Zee Bangla Gourav Samman for her role in Ashchorjyo Prodeep (2013). She was further acclaimed for her role in Raja Dasgupta's Bengali film Choukaath (2016). She made her Bollywood debut in Reema Mukherjee's directorial debut Ardhangini Ek Ardhsatya (2016). Mitra has also an extensive career on television. Her notable telefilms include Dwicharini, Raja Opera, Teen Satyi, Dui Purush, Teen Purush and Ami Shey O Anu, to name a few. Her notable television series include Trishna, Ei To Jiban, Pratibimba, Bhanga Gorar Khela, Probahini Ei Samay and Bandhan, to name few. She was also a judge on the Bengali standup comedy show Mirakkel.

== Early life and education ==
Mitra was born in Dum Dum Cantonment, Calcutta. Her father Santosh Mitra was a thespian actor. She passed ICSE from Auxilium Convent School, Dum Dum. She completed her graduation at Jaypuriya College, with English literature as her honours subject. She went to pursue masters in English literature at Calcutta University but quit it when she got a job at Taj Hotel, Kolkata.

== Career ==
Mitra grew her urge to be an actress during her school days. While working at Taj Hotel, Kolkata, she was advised by one of her acquaintances to appear for an audition conducted by Teleframe, the production house of Samaresh Majumdar who had been looking for a fresh face for the female lead of his new Bengali TV series Balikar Prem. She appeared wearing a saree. At first, Dulal Lahiri, the director of the TV series and Majumdar, the producer and screenplay writer were reluctant to cast her since they had been looking for a girl who had to portray a teenager in the TV series. She was finalized after she reappeared wearing a skirt. The TV series was not completed ultimately. Ranjit Mallick portrayed the role of her father in it. She then, started working as an anchor in several programmes aired in Channel 8. During her working schedule in Channel 8, she met Rabiranjan Maitra who helped her bag roles in two consecutive Odia feature films.

In 1996, she was proposed to play the female lead in the Bengali TV series Trishna. It was directed by Anindya Sarkar. Her role as Nabanita in the TV series earned her popularity. At a fast pace she carried on with prominent roles in Bengali films. Her first film alongside Prosenjit Chatterjee was Samadhan (1997) directed by Swapan Saha. The film also stars Rituparna Sengupta as the ladylove of the character played by Chatterjee. Mitra played the role of the sister of the character played by Chatterjee. She often reminisced that, back in 1990s, she was always told to play the sister to Chatterjee even though she had potential to play the female lead. She bagged the female lead opposite Chatterjee in Sagarbanya (1998). While shooting for the film, she had an accident, for which she had to lose significant roles in several films. She featured in Basu Chatterjee's Hothat Brishti (1998) where she portrayed Priti. The film came out as a major success at the box office. In her 2020 vlog Let's Expose Face It, she claimed that she never had any significant elevation in her career even after the huge success of Hothat Brishti (1998). She exposed that she had to lose a number of central female roles since she never showed any interest to be the ladylove of Prosenjit Chatterjee who, then had a monopolistic foothold in Bengali film industry. Till 2001, she had to play the second fiddle in the films she was offered. She featured as the female lead opposite Prosenjit Chatterjee in Rabi Kinagi's Annadata (2002).

It wasn’t something I did on an impulse; it was latent inside me. Sushant’s death acted as a catalyst. I revisited that trauma. I’ve suffered the sense of neglect, of identity crisis, gone through depression, even contemplated suicide. Why would I knock on doors asking for work?

— Mitra on why she raised her voice against the ongoing nepotism in Bengali cinema (in an interview conducted by Indian Express)

She garnered wider applause for her role in Pratibimba, a Bengali TV series broadcast on Alpha Bangla between 2002 and 2004. The series was a major commercial success running 700 episodes.

In 2003, Mitra appeared, alongside Aamir Khan in a Coca-Cola advertisement directed by Pradip Sarkar. Sarkar proposed her to portray the role of Gayatri in his directorial venture Parineeta (2005). She eschewed the role. She never clarified why she refused Parineeta. She was then featured in Arghyakamal Mitra's Jonmodin (2005). In 2006, she came to wider attention for her role in Bappaditya Bandopadhyay's much acclaimed film Kantatar, where she essayed the character of Sudha, an illegal immigrant who moves from one man to another and from one religion to another in quest of love. The film earned her the Anandalok Award for Best Actress in 2006 and BFJA Award for Best Actress in 2007. She featured in Manoj Michigan's Bengali drama film Hello Kolkata (2008). She featured as Raka opposite Indraneil Sengupta in Kamaleswar Mukherjee's drama film Uro Chithi (2011). It won critical favour for her performance in Uro Chithi (2011). She was awarded the Zee Bangla Gourav Samman for Best Supporting Actress for her role in the film. She featured as Madhumita Sanyal in Anik Dutta's Bhooter Bhabishyat (2012). In 2014, she was nominated for the Filmfare Award East for Best Supporting Actress for her role in Ashchorjyo Prodeep.

Suman Ghosh approached her to portray the role of Binodini Dasi in his Kadambari (2015). She featured in Arindam Sil's Swade Ahlade (2015). In 2015, she collaborated with Raja Dasgupta in his big screen directorial debut Choukaath, where she essayed the role of Debi who meets an accident, loses her consciousness and is taken to the hospital by an unknown passer-by. When she regains her consciousness, she cannot recall what happened to her after the accident. Later, she discovers that her husband suspects that she was raped after the accident and bears the rapist's child. The film was a critical success. Mitra was well acclaimed for her performance in the film. Anandabajar claimed that her performance in the film was the best one until date. Times of India described her performance as "understated and dignified in her pain".

She accepted the role of Bimala in Reema Mukherjee's directorial debut Ardhangini Ek Ardhsatya (2016) based on Tagore's much celebrated novel Ghare Baire. The film met neither critical nor commercial success. Mitra eschewed the lead in Dupur Thakurpo: Season 2.

Mitra featured as 'Pori pishi' in Rainbow Jelly (2018), a film by Soukarya Ghosal. Her performance in the film won her critical favour. She featured in Anshumaan Banerjee's Baro Second (2020) where she played Srijita alongside Silajit portraying Debanjan, Srijita's husband and the male protagonist. Her directorial venture is Bitter Half. She will be seen in The Inside Job, a film directed by Shieladitya Moulik. She featured in Nirbhaya.

Sreelekha starred in Aditya Vikram Sengupta's third feature film, Once Upon a Time in Calcutta, as Ela, the protagonist of the film. She plays a bereaved mother who wants a separation from her husband and struggles to have a separate house for herself. To fit in the shoe of the character, Sengupta never approved her to wear any makeup.

I could see myself in Ela as well. A bit of Sreelekha rubbed onto Ela and a bit of Ela rubbed onto Sreelekha. An osmosis was happening between us. I could feel Ela’s angst, pain, desperation, but due to that desperation things that Ela did Sreelekha would never do; something which I think is amoral.

— Mitra on her role in Once Upon a Time in Calcutta (in an interview conducted by Indian Express)

The film had its world premiere at the 78th Venice International Film Festival. Mid-Day considered the film one of the 20 best Indian films of 2021. Of her performance in the film, Anupama Chopra writes, "Sreelekha plays Ela without a trace of vanity. Her circumstances might be pathetic but she certainly isn't. Instead, Aditya and Gokhan imbue her life with poetry." For her performance, she got overwhelmingly positive reviews. The role earned her an award in the Best Actress in a Leading Role category at the New York Indian Film Festival, 2022.

Her directorial venture Ebong Chaad won the Best Short Film award at the Colaj Bengaluru Bengali Film Festival, 2022 and She was awarded in the Best Director — Short Film category. Mitra, then, featured in Raaj Mukherjee's Bengali drama film Tritiyo Purush (2022). She would be seen in Fair and Ugly directed by Prosenjit Biswas. She approached by Rashed Raha, to portray the role of Anamika Saha, a successful entrepreneur his Bangladeshi venture Kolkata Diaries. The screenplay was written by Khairul Basar.

== In media ==
=== Let's Expose Face It (2020 vlog) ===
On 17 June 2020, Mitra uploaded a vlog Let's Expose Face It on her YouTube channel Aami Sreelekha claiming that she never had a significant elevation in her career even after the remarkable success of Hothat Brishti (1998) since she never reciprocated to the love proposal of Prosenjit Chatterjee who then had a monopolistic foothold in Bengali cinema. She said that Rituparna Sengupta rode the crest of her career so easily as she had a love affair with Chatterjee in the late 1990s. The vlog stirred Media. Chatterjee never responded to her statement. Sengupta opened up that she had not worked with Chatterjee since 2001 until 2015 but had managed to last in the Bengali film industry. In the vlog, she also implicated that Swastika Mukherjee had a smooth career since she always had affairs with various actors and directors.

== Controversies ==
Binodini Issues

Binodini issue After Rukmini Maitra's look as Nati Binodini was published, Mitra made a Facebook post interrogating whether the concerned thespian actress was slim. She further added that she would not have criticised the casting of the film if Ananya Chatterjee had been cast.

Allegations against director Ranjith

The bedroom was dark and there was a balcony. When I talked to the cinematographer over the phone, he was standing beside me. He was playing with my bangles and touching my skin. We women have the sixth sense. I felt uncomfortable, but I was trying to give him the benefit of doubt. I thought I was overthinking and thought he wanted to see my bangles. I was not feeling ok with him. The room was dark. After realising that I was not reacting or taking back my hand, he tried to play with my neck and hair. Then, I excused myself and left the room. This was not shocking, but I know how the film industry works by and large. There are good and bad people.

— Mitra on Ranjith, in an interview conducted by PTI

On 23 August 2024, in the wake of Hema Committee report, Mitra levelled accusations against Indian filmmaker Ranjith at Ernakulam Town Police Station. In an interview with PTI, she alleged that she walked out of his directorial venture Paleri Manikyam: Oru Pathirakolapathakathinte Katha (2009) as he intended to seek sexual favour from her during the audition. She further added that she did not have confidence to pursue the matter any further to prosecute Ranjith for the offence attracting sections 354, and 354 B of the IPC at the time of the commission of crime as she hailed from West Bengal. Ranjith denied the charges. He said that she was summoned for the audition and was rejected as she was found unsuitable for the role of the movie. (Note: National Award winning Indian filmmaker Joshy Joseph claimed that Mitra was finalized for the role.) Veena George said in this regard that Kerala Government would provide all the facilities and safety in case Mitra intended to go ahead with the allegation. National Award winning Indian filmmaker Joshy Joseph persuaded her to file an official complaint against Ranjith.

Certain comments from the public functionaries also were brought to my notice and the response would show that a written complaint is necessary to register a crime. As the conduct of Sri Ranjith constitute the commission of a cognizable offence, a written complaint is not a prerequisite, as I am told, following the judgment of the Hon'ble Supreme Court. In view of the public stand taken by the public functionaries in the State of Kerala, that a written complaint is a prerequisite, I am lodging this complaint by way of e-mail addressed your goodself as the offence has been committed within your territorial limits at DD Flats, Kadavanthra, Kochi. This may be treated as a complaint and set the law in motion, as insisted by the State functionaries to initiate criminal action against an offender.

— Mitra substantiating her official complaint against Ranjith

On 26 August 2024, Mitra lodged an official complaint against Ranjith with the Kochi Police Commissioner claiming that the director had clutched her hand and later on attempted to spread his hand to the other parts of her body with sexual intention. She wrote that the incident took place in DD Flats in Kadavanthra, Kochi where she was invited to discuss her role.

== Political career ==
Mitra is a member of the CPI(M) and has campaigned for the leftist cause in the West Bengal elections. Her father had also been a member of CPI(M).

== Personal life ==
While working in Teen Satyi, a Bengali telefilm for ETV Bangla, Sreelekha met Siladitya Sanyal who was the assistant director of the telefilm. Sanyal works as a professor in SRFTI. They married on 20 November 2003. They separated in 2013. They have a daughter named Oishi Sanyal born on 7 December 2005.

She was offended when she was informed by director Aditya Vikram Sengupta that her name was not there in the credit-list of Rainbow Jelly on Netflix.

== Awards ==
Award	Year	Category	Film	TV series	Result	Ref.
BFJA Award	2007	Best Actress in a Leading Role	Kantatar		Won	
WBFJA Award	2019	Best Actress in a Supporting Role	Rainbow Jelly		Nominated	
Filmfare Awards East	2014	Best Actress in a Supporting Role	Ashchorjyo Prodeep		Nominated	
Anandalok Award	2006	Best Actress in a Leading Role	Kantatar		Won	
Anandalok Award	2008	Best Actress in a Leading Role	Tolly Lights		Nominated	
Zee Bangla Gourav Samman	2012	Best Actress in a Supporting Role	Uro Chithi		Won	
Zee Bangla Gourav Samman	2014	Best Actress in a Supporting Role	Ashchorjyo Prodeep		Nominated	
Big Bangla Movie Award	2010	Best Actress in a Supporting Role	Mahanagar@Kolkata		Won	
Kalakar Award	2003	Best Actress (Television)		Pratibimba	Won	
Kalakar Award	2009	Best Actress	Tolly Lights		Won	
Telangana Bengali Film Festival	2021	Best actress in a Supporting Role (Popular)	Nirbhaya		Won	
New York Indian Film Festival Award	2022	Best Actress in a Leading Role	Once Upon a Time in Calcutta		Won	
Melbourne Indian Film Festival	2022	Best Actress in a Leading Role	Once Upon a Time in Calcutta		Nominated	
