= Lolita Chatterjee =

Indian actress (1937–2018)

Lolita Chatterjee (1937 – 9 May 2018) was an actress who worked in Bengali Cinema. She made her debut as an adult in 1964 and played her first role in the Bengali classic ‘Bibhas’ alongside Uttam Kumar.

== Career ==
She made her debut as a child actor in 1949 film Ananya. She later acted in a Bengali classic ‘Bibhas’ alongside Uttam Kumar. Afterwards, she acted in a few other Bengali films and then eventually moved to Mumbai.

She acted in films in the 1960s and ’70s, Bollywood films, and was cast in small yet important roles in ‘Raat Andheri Thi’, ‘Aap Ki Kasam’, ‘Talaash’, ‘Victoria No. 203’ and ‘Pushpanjali’. Her last film was Jonaki (2018) directed by Aditya Vikram Sengupta.

She died following a cerebral stroke in Kolkata nursing, at the age of 81.
