= Anandalok Best Male Playback Award =

Anandalok Puraskar or Anandalok Awards (Bengali: আনন্দলোক পুরস্কার) ceremony is one of the most prominent film events for Bengali Cinema in India. Anandalok, a film magazine in Bengali language, published by Ananda Publishers and Ananda Bazar Patrika, presents this award (Puraskar). The magazine was launched on 25 January 1975 and the awards (Puraskar) ceremony was started in 1998.

== Winners ==
Year	Winner	Film
1998	Kumar Sanu	Gane Bhubon Bhoriye Debo
1999	Kumar Sanu	Ami Sei Meye
2003	Srikanta Acharya	Aamar Bhubon
2004	Babul Supriyo	Sangee
2004	Sonu Nigam	Bandhan
2006	Pranjal Bakshi	Bhalobashar Arek Naam
2025	Rathijit Bhattacharjee	Khadaan

Records :-

Record	Name	Years
Most Winner	Kumar Sanu (2)	1998, 1999
First Winner	Kumar Sanu	1998
Last Winner	Pranjal Bakshi	2006

== See also ==
- List of Asian television awards
