= Once Upon a Time in Calcutta =

- Film poster
- Directed by: Aditya Vikram Sengupta
- Written by: Aditya Vikram Sengupta
- Produced by: Anshulika Dubey; Priyankar Agarwal; Shashwat Singh; Aditya Vikram Sengupta; Jonaki Bhattacharya; Priyankar Patra; Vikram Mohanta
- Starring: Sreelekha Mitra; Arindam Ghosh; Anirban Chakrabarti; Shayak Roy; Rikita Nandini Shimu; Satrajit Sarkar; Bratya Basu
- Cinematography: Gökhan Tiryaki
- Edited by: Aditya Vikram Sengupta
- Music by: Minco Eggersman
- Production company: For Films
- Distributed by: SVF Entertainment
- Release dates: 7 September 2021 (Venice); 7 February 2025 (India)
- Countries: India; France; Norway
- Language: Bengali

Mayanagar (transl. City Of Illusions), released internationally as Once Upon A Time In Calcutta is a 2021 Bengali-language drama film directed by Aditya Vikram Sengupta. It is the third film by the Indian director and produced by Wishberry Films, in association with For Films, with Catherine Dussart Productions (of France) and DUOfilm As (of Norway). The film had its world premiere at the 78th Venice International Film Festival in September 2021.

The film stars Sreelekha Mitra as the protagonist, along with Arindam Ghosh, Bratya Basu, Satrajit Sarkar, Anirban Chakrabarti, Rikita Nandini Shimu and debutant Shayak Roy in supporting roles. The film was in development since 2015 and was part of the LÁtleier Cinefondation at the Cannes Film Festival before it was supported by CNC, Sorfond and NFDC Film Bazaar.

Sengupta says he got the idea for the film when he took a picture of a dinosaur statue outside Kolkata's Science City, which was fast being overshadowed by the construction of a new flyover – a literal representation of a relic from the past, juxtaposed with a symbol of Kolkata's economic development. To Screen Daily, Sengupta mentions, "It looked like the flyover and the dinosaur were about to start a race". It received two awards at New York Indian Film Festival, 2022, including Best Direction for Sengupta and Best Actress for Mitra. The film was released theatrically in India on 7 February 2025.

== Synopsis ==
Ela (Sreelekha Mitra), a bereaved mother, wants to leave the house of her husband and start an independent life of her own. She's the daughter of a cabaret dancer, who once had an affair with the owner of an iconic theatre in North Calcutta, called Circarena (the first revolving stage in Asia, owned by Amar Ghosh). Ela's step-brother, Bubu (Bratya Basu) lives alone in the now abandoned theatre.

Unable to secure a bank loan to buy a house of her own, Ela uses her boss, owner of a ponzi-scheme to get what she wants. Soon, however, she realizes that she's not the only scavenger in a city hungry for more.

The film is inspired by true events.

== Cast ==
- Sreelekha Mitra as Ela
- Bratya Basu as Bubu
- Satrajit Sarkar as Shishir
- Arindam Ghosh as Bhaskar
- Shayak Roy as Raja
- Rikita Nandini Shimu as Pinky
- Anirban Chakrabarti as Pradipta

== Production ==
The film was shot over a period of two and half months in Kolkata, India.

Initially, Fred Keleman was supposed to shoot the film, which was then titled Memories and My Mother. Later, Gökhan Tiryaki, the collaborator of Nuri Bilge Ceylan came on board as the cinematographer.

The shoot was abruptly interrupted because the production refused to play by the rules of the Federation. The conflict arose when the Federation asked Aditya Vikram to hire its members. Generally, a film shot in Kolkata has to have approximately 70 members from the Federation in its crew. Many directors and production houses have complained that sometimes it gets too much for them to abide by this norm. "They wanted us to work with their members. That wasn't possible for me as I have my own team. When I refused, the Federation president said they would not let me work in Kolkata. That is when I realised this was an unfair logic and stopped indulging in it. I found it juvenile," Aditya told Times of India.

Jonaki Bhattacharya, who previously collaborated with Aditya on Labour of Love and Jonaki joined as the executive producer and the production designer. Dutch composer, Minco Eggersman, was the last to creatively come on board and scored the original soundtrack of the film.

== Release ==
The film premiered at the 78th Venice International Film Festival. The premiere was attended by the lead actors Sreelekha Mitra and Arindam Ghosh, along with co-producers Catherine Dussart and Ingrid Lill Høgtun, and For Films producer, Priyankar Patra, who also attended the Venice Production Bridge to pitch Sengupta's next project. The film had its North American premiere at the New Directors New Films MoMA in 2022 before screening and winning awards at other festivals in the US.

== Reception ==
The film received overwhelmingly positive reviews after the Venice screening.

Saibal Chatterjee of NDTV gave the film four out of five stars. He writes, "Once Upon A Time In Calcutta is a triumph. It meshes the intimate with the epic with glorious felicity." Giving the film 4.5 out of 5, The Quint writes, "As we concentrate on the minutiae of everyday life, the film captures with tenderness and brilliance a city in flux."

The Hindu in its post-Venice coverage added, "save Dune for IMAX, don't miss Once Upon a Time in Calcutta." David Katz of Cineuropa gave the film a positive review, calling it "a cinematic poem to contemporary Kolkata". Anupama Chopra praises Sreelekha Mitra in her review for Film Companion, "Sreelekha plays Ela without a trace of vanity. Her circumstances might be pathetic but she certainly isn't. Instead, Aditya and Gokhan imbue her life with poetry."

== Awards ==
Award	Year	Category	Recipient	Result	Ref.
El Gouna Film Festival	2021	NETPAC Special Mention	Aditya Vikram Sengupta	Won	
Washington DC International Film Festival	2022	Circle Award	Aditya Vikram Sengupta	Won	
Indian Film Festival of Los Angeles	2022	Grand Jury Award - Best Feature Film	Aditya Vikram Sengupta	Won	
New York Indian Film Festival Award	2022	Best Director	Aditya Vikram Sengupta	Won	
New York Indian Film Festival Award	2022	Best Actress in a Leading Role	Sreelekha Mitra	Won	
WBFJA Award	2026	Best film	Aditya Vikram Sengupta	Won	
WBFJA Award	2026	Best director	Aditya Vikram Sengupta	Nominated	
WBFJA Award	2026	Best actress in a leading role	Sreelekha Mitra	Nominated	
