= Jonaki (film) =

2018 Bengali film

- Release poster
- Directed by: Aditya Vikram Sengupta
- Written by: Aditya Vikram Sengupta
- Produced by: Samir Sarkar
- Starring: Lolita Chatterjee; Jim Sarbh; Ratnabali Bhattacharjee; Sumanto Chattopadhyay
- Cinematography: Aditya Vikram Sengupta; Mahendra Shetty
- Music by: Alexander Zekke
- Production company: Magic Hour Films
- Release date: 25 January 2018
- Running time: 95 minutes
- Countries: India, France, Singapore
- Language: Bengali

Jonaki (Firefly) is a 2018 Bengali-language psychological drama film directed by Aditya Vikram Sengupta and produced by Samir Sarkar. An India, France, Singapore co-production the film is produced by Magic Hour Films in association with For Films and Catherine Dussart Production. Jonaki is the "dream" of an 81-year-old woman who in her comatose state revisits her tumultuous life through surrealistic images of painful echoing memories. The film stars late Lolita Chatterjee, Jim Sarbh, Ratnabali Bhattacharjee and Sumanto Chattopadhyay.

Jonaki had its world premiere in the Bright Future section of the 47th International Film Festival Rotterdam in 2018 where it was nominated for the coveted Netpac Awards. It then travelled to several international film festivals including the Shanghai International Film Festival, New Horizons Film Festival, Indian Film Festival of Los Angeles, Indian Melbourne Film Festival amongst others.

Jonaki was nominated for the Golden Gateway of India for Best Film at the 20th Mumbai Film Festival (MAMI) in 2018 and went on to win the Silver Gateway Award. It also won a Special Mention for Best Film on Gender Equality at the Oxfam Awards in 2018.

Jonaki is available on Netflix.

== Plot ==
While Jonaki, an 80-year-old woman, searches for love in a strange world of decaying memories, her lover, now old and grey, returns to a world she is leaving behind.

== Cast ==
- Lolita Chatterjee as Jonaki
- Jim Sarbh
- Ratnabali Bhattacharjee
- Sumanto Chattopadhyay
