= Kantatar =

2005 Indian Bengali film

- DVD cover of Kantatar
- Directed by: Bappaditya Bandopadhyay
- Written by: Debasis Bandopadhyay
- Produced by: Binay Prakash
- Starring: Sreelekha Mitra; Sudip Mukherjee
- Cinematography: Rana Dasgupta
- Edited by: Uttam Roy
- Music by: Abhijit Bose
- Distributed by: Shristri Prods
- Release dates: 22 July 2005 (Osian's-Cinefan Festival of Asian Cinema); 31 January 2006
- Running time: 119 minutes
- Country: India
- Language: Bengali

Kantatar (Bengali: কাঁটাতার, Barbed Wire) is a 2005 Bengali film directed by Bappaditya Bandopadhyay, featuring Sreelekha Mitra, Sudip Mukherjee, and Rudranil Ghosh. It received NETPAC Award at Vesoul International Film Festival of Asian Cinema, 2007 for its deceptively simple style with which the complex situation of people trapped in a state of permanent displacement is exposed.

== Plot ==
Kantatar (Barbed Wire) revolves around the journey of Sudha (Sreelekha Mitra), a socio-political-love drama, Kantatar centers on an illegal immigrant's search for identity and her effort to survive sake and in search of an identity, moves from one man to another and from one religion to another. The sudden threat of cross border terrorism entirely changes the socio-political situation in a remote village close to the frontier, the army rolls into town, and the drastic changes take their toll on inter-personal relationships as they are marred by suspicion, competition and fear. Sudha takes refuge in a temporary weather camp just outside the village. She develops a physical relationship with Binod (Sudip Mukherjee), the weather balloonist, whose job it is to take note of the frequent change of wind direction. But soon Sudha's identity comes into question and she is seen as a suspect. Her dream of a secure shelter is once again threatened. This is a beautiful and engaging film, which luxuriates in the story and its location. The visual poetry and unfettered exploration of the ongoing conflict on the borders of India and Bangladesh come together with great impact and insight. There are brilliant touches of both satire and social comment, which go to show that Bappaditya Bandhopadhay has a lot to say about today's India. Sudha's hard life consists of weaving herself in and out of different relationships with men and dabbling in various religions. The immediate threat of attack entirely changes the climate of her remote border village, and as the army rolls into town, inter-personal relationships are drastically affected. Suspicion, competition and fear start to grip the villagers. Sudha takes refuge in a temporary weather camp just outside the village. Binod, a meteorologist working in the village, becomes fascinated by Sudha, and they soon begin a physical relationship. But when Sudha's identity is called into question, she is seen as a terrorist suspect. Her dreams of security are once again threatened. Kantatar is visually engaging, luxuriating in the lush locales where it was filmed. Director Bappaditya Bandhopadhay relies on both satire and social comment to tell his story, all the while exploring the ongoing conflict on the borders of India and Bangladesh. Modern India is portrayed with great impact and insight.

== Cast ==
- Sreelekha Mitra as Sudha
- Sudip Mukherjee as Binod
- Rudranil Ghosh
- Nimai Ghosh
- Papia Ghoshal
- Pradip Bhattacharya
- Shankar Debnath
- Sudin Adhikari
- Iqbal Sultan

== Critical reception ==
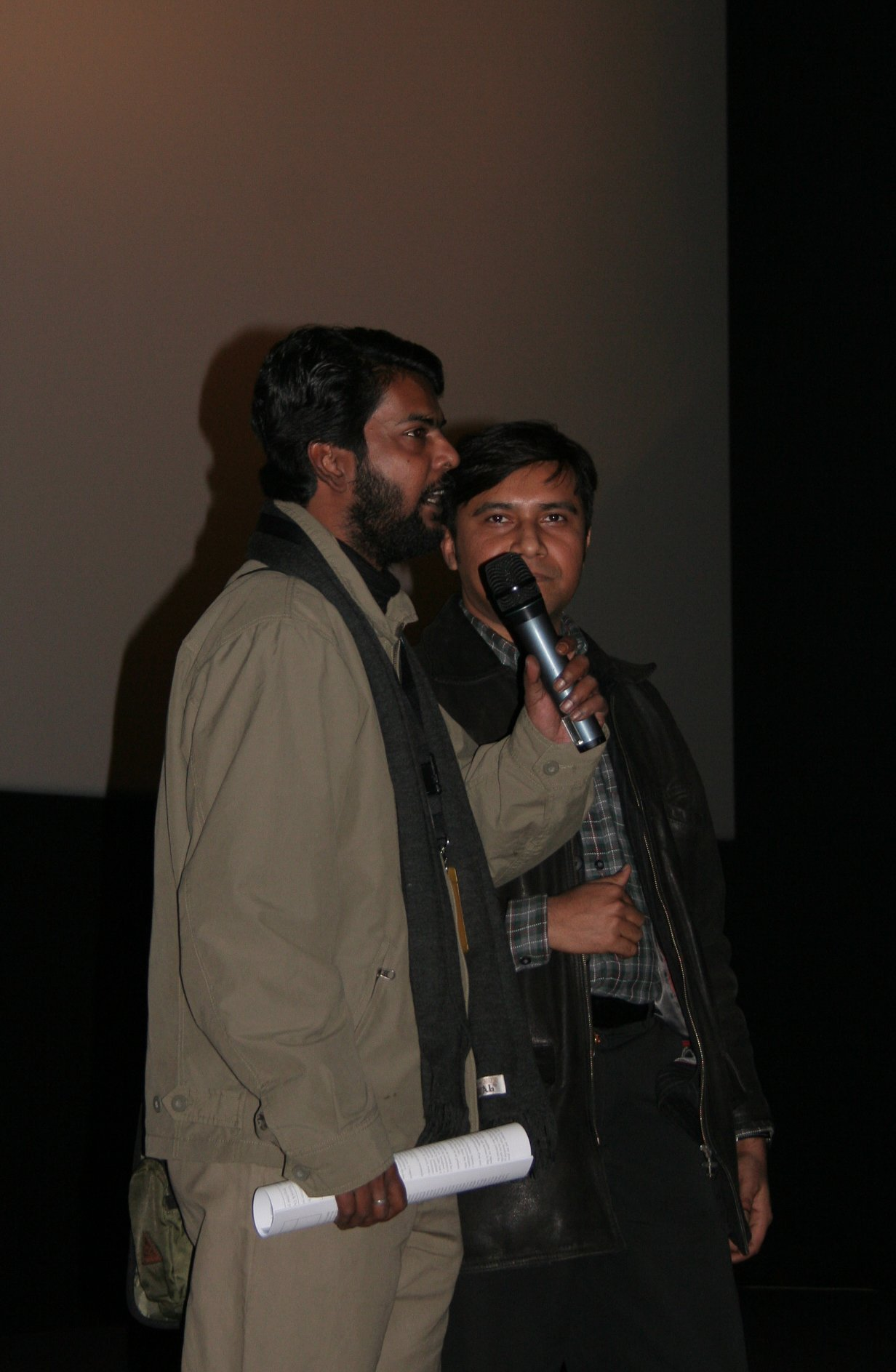
Bappaditya Bandopadhyay at International Asian movies festival in Vesoul, 2007

- Though a favourite with foreign festivals (the poster screams that the film has already been to five international fests), Kantatar could have done with a little more finesse.-The Telegraph (4 stars out of 10)

== Awards ==
Award	Year	Category	Recipient	Result	Ref.
NETPAC Award at Vesoul International Film Festival of Asian Cinema	2007		Bappaditya Bandopadhyay	Won	
BFJA Awards	2007	Best Actress in a Leading Role	Sreelekha Mitra	Won	
BFJA Awards	2007	Best Actor in a Supporting Role	Rudranil Ghosh	Won	
BFJA Awards	2007	Best Cinematographer	Rana Dasgupta	Won	
Anandalok Awards	2006	Best Actress	Sreelekha Mitra	Won	

- Fribourg International Film Festival, Switzerland, 2006
- São Paulo International Film Festival, Brazil, 2006
- Singapore International Film Festival, 2006
- Raindance International Film Festival, London, U.K. 2005
- Ashdod International Film Festival, Tel Aviv, Israel, 2006
- Bangladesh International Film Festival, Dhaka, 2006
- Inaugural film, International Forum of new cinema, Kolkata International Film Festival, India, 2005
- Inaugural film Chittagong International Film Festival, Bangladesh 2005
- Osian Cinefan Festival of Asian Cinema, New Delhi, India 2005
- Mumbai International Film Festival, India, 2006
- Pune International Film Festival, India, 2005
- Habitat International Film Festival, New Delhi, India, 2005
- Festival des Cinémas d'Asie, Vesoul, 2007
- Silk screen Festival of Asian Cinema, Pittsburg, U.S.A. 2007
- Anandaloke Award for Best Actress.
- B.F.J.A. Awards for Best Cinematographer, Best Actress and Best Supporting Actor.
- Partha Pratim Chowdhury Award for Best Film and Best Director.

World Sales: Wide Management Ltd. France
