= Ardhangini Ek Ardhsatya =

- Poster of the film
- Directed by: Reema Mukherjee
- Produced by: Reema Mukherjee
- Starring: Subodh Bhave; Sreelekha Mitra; Subrat Dutta; Manoj Mitra; Reema Lagoo; Varsha Usgaonkar
- Release date: 1 July 2016

Ardhangini Ek Ardhsatya is a 2016 Hindi film produced and directed by Reema Mukherjee. The film is based on Rabindranath Tagore's classic 1916 novel The Home and the World. It is set against backdrop of the freedom movement. The film stars Subodh Bhave, Sreelekha Mitra, Subrat Dutta, Manoj Mitra, Reema Lagoo, Varsha Usgaonkar.

== Cast ==
- Subodh Bhave
- Sreelekha Mitra
- Subrat Dutt
- Manoj Mitra
- Reema Lagoo
- Varsha Usgaonkar
- Arjun Rajput
