= Swagatalakshmi Dasgupta =

Indian singer

- Born: Swagatalakshmi Dasgupta; Calcutta, West Bengal, India
- Occupation: Singer
- Website: www.swagatalakshmi.com

Swagatalakshmi Dasgupta (Bengali pronunciation: [ʃaɡotalokkʰi daʃɡupto]) is a Bengali musician and exponent of Rabindra Sangeet.

== Early life ==
Dasgupta was born into a musical family, the daughter of Late Shri Pabitra Dasgupta, a lecturer at Bhatkhande Marris Music College in Lucknow, who trained her in pure Hindustani classical music. Swagatalakshmi completed her M.A. in music at Rabindra Bharati University, Kolkata. She received further training from Smt. Maya Sen, an expert on Rabindra Sangeet. Swagatalakshmi subsequently worked at Rabindra Bharati University for two years as a lecturer.

In 1985, Swagatalakshmi won the All India Singing Talent Contest, leading her towards the musical profession. The following year, she came first in Rabindra Sangeet and Bhajan in the All India Radio Music Competition (Akashbani), and Rabindra Sangeet and Atul Prasadee in West Bengal Rajya Music Competition.

== Music ==
Swagatalakshmi has recorded over 5000 songs across genres including North Indian classical music, Rabindra sangeet, Carnatic classical music, Western music, Scottish and Irish folk songs, Gazal, Nazrul Geeti, modern Bengali songs, Sanskrit Stotras and chanting. In 2006 she recorded the entire Geetabitan (2,023 Songs of Rabindranath Tagore) in 105 days, released as the album Ekla Geetobitan on 8 August 2006, the anniversary of Tagore's death. She has also recorded the entire 700-verse Bhagavad Gita, Sampurna Chandi, Sanskrit Veda, and the whole of Tagore's Gitanjali. Swagatalakshmi has released over 225 albums.

Swagatalakshmi sings in nine languages: Bengali, Urdu, Hindi, Sanskrit, Telugu, Tamil, Scottish, English, and Assamese, and has performed internationally. She often accompanies herself on piano, and composes and plays the musical score for her albums. She was the music director, lyricist and singer in the film Ding-Dong, directed by Chinmoy Roy.

== Writing ==
Swagatalakshmi has published three books on poetry and songs: Jhaapsa Holo Taapoor Toopoor, Duoranir Chithi, and Aakasher Gaan.

== Awards and honors ==
- 1995: Promothesh Barua Award for best female performance
- 1997: Uttam Kumar Award for best Rabindra Sangeet cassette (Esechho Prem)
- 1998: Anandolok Award for best Female Playback Singer
- 1998: Sailajaranjan Award
- 1998/99: Dishari (Film Journalist Award) for best female playback
- 1999: Cha-Cha-Cha Award for outstanding achievement in music during the 1990s
- 2002: Anandolok Award for best Female Playback Singer
- 2003: Anandolok Award for best Female Playback Singer
- 2004: Zee Bangla television award for Best Rabindra Sangeet album by a female artist (Chena Fagun)

Swagatalakshmi also received the Millennium Kalakar Award for her outstanding contribution to Indian music, and the Bharat Nirman Award and Sangeet Mahasamman Award from the Government of West Bengal in 2013.
