= Asha Jaoar Majhe =

2014 Indian Bengali film

- Film poster
- Directed by: Aditya Vikram Sengupta
- Written by: Aditya Vikram Sengupta
- Produced by: For Films
- Starring: Ritwick Chakraborty; Basabdatta Chatterjee
- Cinematography: Mahendra J. Shetty; Aditya Vikram Sengupta
- Edited by: Aditya Vikram Sengupta
- Music by: Alokananda Dasgupta
- Distributed by: For Films
- Release dates: 2 September 2014 (Venice Days Film Festival 2014); 26 June 2015 (India)
- Running time: 84 minutes
- Country: India

Asha Jaoar Majhe (transl. Labour of Love) is a 2014 Indian film by Aditya Vikram Sengupta. The film stars Ritwick Chakraborty and Basabdatta Chatterjee as an unnamed married couple, which brings focus to the hard lives endured by ordinary working people in Kolkata.

The film premiered at the 11th Venice Days at the Venice International Film Festival on 4 September 2014 At the 62nd National Film Awards, it won the Indira Gandhi Award for Best Debut Film of a Director and Best Audiography.

== Plot ==
A woman (Basabdatta Chatterjee) works in a handbag factory while a man (Ritwick Chakraborty) works the night shift at a printing press. The film follows that young married couple as they go about their day, how they stay apart all day long except one brief moment when they get to be with each other. The entire movie has no dialogue. It has background music and some classic old songs thrown in for a soothing effect.

== Cast ==
- Ritwick Chakraborty as the Man
- Basabdatta Chatterjee as the Woman

== Awards ==
62nd National Film Awards (India)

- Indira Gandhi Award for Best Debut Film
- Best Audiography

New York Indian Film Festival

- Best Film
- Best Director
- Best Original Screenplay

World Premiere at the 11th Venice Days Film Festival

- Best Debut Film

Marrakech International Film Festival

- Best Director

Abu Dhabi Film Festival

- Jury Special Mention

BFI London Film Festival

- Honorable Mention

Bangalore International Film Festival

- NETPAC Award for Best Asian Film

Jaipur International Film Festival

- Best Feature Film
