= Mahanagar@Kolkata =

- Directed by: Suman Mukhopadhyay
- Written by: Nabarun Bhattacharya
- Based on: i) Ek Tukro Nyloner Dori, ii) Amar Kono Bhoy Nei Toh and iii) Angshik Chandragrahan by Nabarun Bhattacharya
- Starring: Anjan Dutt; Sreelekha Mitra; Rituparna Sengupta; Arun Mukherjee
- Cinematography: Indranil Mukherjee
- Edited by: Arghyakamal Mitra
- Release date: 2010
- Country: India
- Language: Bengali

Mahanagar@Kolkata is a 2010 Bengali film directed by Suman Mukhopadhyay. The film is based on three stories of Nabarun Bhattacharya. The film was screened in Munich film festivals.

== Plot ==
Director Suman Mukhopadhyay has strung three stories of Nabarun Bhattacharya Ek Tukro Nyloner Dori, Amar Kono Bhoy Nei Toh and Angshik Chandragrahan to create this film. The story of the film revolves around the people and their life of Kolkata metropolitan city. The film explores the different worlds of Manmatha, Jagadish, Biren, Rohit, Rangili and Kamalini. Manmatha and Jagadish belong to different economic and social class. Biren is jobless. Rohit is an NRI, Rangili is wife of Rohit. Rohit has a relationship with Kamalini, another woman.

== Cast ==
- Anjan Dutt as Manmatha
- Biplab Chatterjee as Jagadish
- Sreelekha Mitra as Kamalini
- Arun Mukherjee as Biren
- Chandan Roy Sanyal as Rohit
- Rituparna Sengupta as Rongili

== Awards ==
2009 National Film Awards

- Won - Silver Lotus Award - Best Male Playback Singer - Rupam Islam for the song "Ei To Ami"
