= Anandalok =

- Editor: Payel Sengupta
- Frequency: Bi-weekly
- First issue: 25 January 1975
- Company: ABP Group
- Country: India
- Language: Bengali
- Website: anandalok.in

Anandalok (Bengali: আনন্দলোক) is a Bengali film magazine published by the ABP Group from Kolkata, India. It is usually published on the 12th and 27th of every month.

Anandalok started on 25 January 1975. In the early 2000s, Rituparno Ghosh was a significant editor of this magazine. However, the editorial board has now been changed. editor-last4 =Sujit Kundu |

According to the Audit Bureau of Circulations (July – December 2022), the total circulation was 76,686. The National Readership Survey 2006 cited readership at 6,78,000.

== See also ==
- Anandalok Awards
