= Arjun Chakraborty =

Indian actor and director

- Born: India
- Occupations: Actor, director
- Years active: 1983–present
- Spouse: Nilanjana Chakraborty

Arjun Chakraborty (Bengali: অর্জুন চক্রবর্তী) is an Indian actor and director based in Kolkata.

He made his debut as an actor in the 1983 Hindi film Zara Si Zindagi, and his first major role was in the 1986 film Ankush starring Nana Patekar. Later he shifted mainly to the Bengali film industry starting with the 1989 film Kari Diye Kinlam. He made his directorial debut in 2008 with the film Tollylights.

== Filmography ==
Chakraborty has acted in 13 feature films, number of tele serials and has directed 1 film.

=== Actor ===
Year	Film	Language	Role	Note	Ref.
1982	Angoor	Hindi		Uncredited role of an employee at Sanjeev Kumar's Office	
1983	Zara Si Zindagi	Hindi	Tilak		
1986	Ankush	Hindi	Arjun		
1989	Ek Din Achanak	Hindi	Neeta's brother		
1989	Pranami Tomay	Bengali	Debashish Roy "Debu"		
1989	Kari Diye Kinlam	Bengali			
1990	Bahattar Din Par	Hindi			
1991	Antardhan	Bengali			
1992	Debota	Bengali			
1993	Atmajo	Bengali			
1994	Thikana	Bengali			
1994	Wheel Chair	Bengali			
1994	Prasab	Bengali			
1995	Karna	Bengali			
1999	Jibon Niye Khela	Bengali	Police Inspector		
2000	Anokha Moti	Hindi			
2000	𝘙𝘪𝘯 𝘔𝘶𝘬𝘵𝘪	Bengali	Ujjwal Biswas		
2004	My Karma	English	Anirban Mallik		
2008	Tollylights	Bengali		Directorial debut	
2012	Charuulata 2011	Bengali			
2012	Ki Kore Bojhabo Tomake	Bengali			
2018	Bhalobasar Bari	Bengali			
2026	Phool Pishi O Edward	Bengali			

=== Director ===
Year	Film	Language	Notes	Ref.
2008	Tollylights	Bengali	Directorial Debut	

== Television ==
Year	Program	Role	Other notes
2004	Sahib Biwi Gulam		Raveena Tandon's television debut
2014–2016	Tumi Robe Nirobe	Jashojit Mukherjee	
