= Tolly Lights =

- Film poster
- Directed by: Arjun Chakraborty
- Written by: Suchitra Bhattacharya
- Produced by: S.D.Ahuja
- Starring: Sreelekha Mitra; Arjun Chakraborty
- Cinematography: Soumik Haldar
- Edited by: Subrata Roy
- Music by: Tejendra Majumdar
- Release date: 29 February 2008
- Country: India
- Language: Bengali

Tolly Lights (Bengali: টলি লাইট "Tolly Lights") is a 2008 Indian Bengali-language drama film directed by Arjun Chakraborty starring Sreelekha Mitra, Abhishek Chatterjee, Priyadarshini Chatterjee and Arjun Chakraborty. It is based on the novel Rangeen Prithibi by Suchitra Bhattacharya.

== Cast ==
- Sreelekha Mitra
- Abhishek Chatterjee
- Samaresh Chakraborty
- Komolika Bannerjee
- Biswajit Chakraborty
- Barun Chanda
- Supriyo Tagore
- Ratul Bhattacharjee
- Haradan Bose
- Gita Dey
- Anindo Banerjee
- Pradip Mukherjee
- Subarna Ghosh
- Rohan Dutta
- Arindol Bagchi
- Debjani Deb
- Arindam Sil
- Mita Chatterjee
- Monica Chakraborty
- Priyadarshini Chatterjee
- Shashank Arora
- Manjula Poley
- Uma Basu
- Amitava Bhattacharya
- Kharaj Mukherjee
- Arjun Chakraborty

=== Special appearances ===
- Sunny Deol
- Tapas Paul
- Satabdi Roy
- Mahaakshay Chakraborty
- Mithun Chakraborty

== Controversy ==
In the 2020 controversial vlog Let's Expose It Face It, Sreelekha Mitra said that Rituparna Sengupta wanted to play the lead in the film. She made a phone call to Arjun Chakraborty and requested him to cast herself replacing Sreelekha Mitra. Sreelekha Mitra claimed that Sengupta went on persisting that she would work at a lower remuneration if Chakraborty cast her.
