= Aditya Vikram Sengupta =

Indian director

- Born: 6 September 1983 (age 42); Kolkata, India
- Occupations: Film Director, Producer, Screenwriter, Cinematographer, Editor
- Years active: 2010–present
- Spouse: Jonaki Bhattacharya (2011-2021)
- Website: forfilmsindia.com

Aditya Vikram Sengupta (born 6 September 1983) is an Indian film director, cinematographer and graphic designer. His first film Asha Jaoar Majhe or Labour of Love, released in 2014 which premiered at the 11th Venice Days section of the Venice International Film Festival, which won him the National Award for Best Debut in India.

== Early life ==
Aditya Vikram Sengupta was born in Kolkata in 1983 to Sharmila Sengupta and Tridib Kumar Sengupta. He attended St. Xavier's Collegiate School and post-school, Aditya was accepted at the prestigious National Institute of Design in Paldi, Ahmedabad. After NID, he worked at Channel [V] for a number of years as a promo and creative director before turning director full-time.

== Career ==
His first directorial venture was the Bengali film Asha Jaoar Majhe (English: Labour of Love) premiered at the 11th Venice Days at the Venice International Film Festival on 4 September 2014. At the 62nd National Film Awards, it won the Indira Gandhi Award for Best First Film of a Director and Best Audiography.

Aditya's second film Jonaki was an international co-production between India-France and Singapore. Catherine Dussart Productions of France and Samir Sarkar's Magic Hour Films were co-producers of Jonaki. Shortly after the festival run of Jonaki, it was available for streaming on Netflix.

Once Upon a Time in Calcutta (previously titled Memories and My Mother) is Aditya's third film and his first collaboration with Turkish director of photography, Gokhan Tiryaki. Filmed in 2019, Once Upon A Time in Calcutta has been selected for 78th Venice Film Festival 2021 in the Orizzonti Competition. The film had its North American premiere at the New Directors New Films MoMA in 2022 before screening and winning awards at other festivals in the US.

According to Variety, Aditya's follow up film, Birthmark, a five country co-production between India, France, Norway, Luxembourg and Denmark, which was initially part of HAF Hong Kong Film Financing Forum, the Venice Gap Financing Market at the Venice Production Bridge and received production support from Luxembourg Film Fund and the Danish Film Institute was shelved because of reasons not disclosed by the production.

Aditya is developing three projects under his home production banner, For Films. First is Death of an Elephant based on a Bengali author Tarashankar Bandopadhyay's short story. The other two projects are Mandrake, a film on magic in Kolkata and an untitled documentary on Bollywood looked through a socio-cultural lens.

Aditya is married to Jonaki Bhattacharya, who also works with him as an Art Director on all of his projects.

== Filmography ==
Year	Title	Director	Writer	Producer	Cinematographer	Editor	Notes	Ref.
2014	Asha Jaoar Majhe	Yes	Yes	Yes	Yes	Yes	Cinematography along with Mahendra Shetty	
2018	Jonaki	Yes	Yes	Yes	Yes	Yes	Cinematography along with Mahendra Shetty	
2021	Mayanagar	Yes	Yes	Yes		Yes		
2025	Puratawn					Yes		
2025	Early Days			Yes			Executive Producer	

== Awards and festival selections ==
Year	Film	Awards
2014	Asha Jaoar Majhe	WORLD PREMIERE Venice International Film Festival (Venice Days) AWARDS National Film Award - WINNER Golden Lotus Award for Best Debut Film of a Director & WINNER Silver Lotus Award for Best Sound Design Venice International Film Festival (Venice Days) - WINNER Best Debut Director BFI London Film Festival - WINNER Honorable Mention New York Indian Film Festival - WINNER Best Film, WINNER Best Director, WINNER Best Script Marrakesh International Film Festival - WINNER Best Director Jaipur International Film Festival - WINNER Best Film Abu Dhabi Film Festival - WINNER Jury Special Mention FESTIVALS International Film Festival of Rotterdam | Busan Film Festival | Kolkata International Film Festival | Los Angeles Indian Film Festival | Warsaw International Film Festival | Shanghai International Film Festival | Lisbon & Estoril Film Festival
2018	Jonaki	WORLD PREMIERE International Film Festival of Rotterdam AWARDS MAMI Mumbai Film Festival - WINNER Silver Gateway Award & Gender Equality Award FESTIVALS Los Angeles Indian Film Festival | Kolkata International Film Festival
	Once Upon A Time In Calcutta†	El Gouna Film Festival winner|SUPPORTED BY Cinefondation L'Atelier - Cannes Film Festival |CNC (Centre national du cinéma et de l'image animée) Sorfond |NFDC Film Bazaar
