= Chander Pahar (franchise) =

Works based on a novel

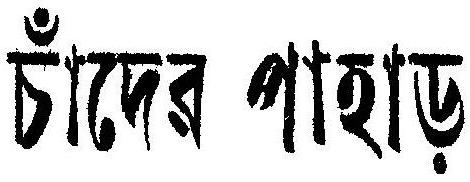
- Created by: Bibhutibhushan Bandyopadhyay
- Original work: Chander Pahar (1937)

Print publications
- Novel(s): Chander Pahar (1937); Chander Upatyaka (2015); Rajhangsir Sarobar (2017)
- Comics: Moon Mountain (2014); Amazon Obhijaan (2017)

Films and television
- Film(s): Chander Pahar (2013); Amazon Obhijaan (2017)

Audio
- Radio program(s): Chander Pahar (Sunday Suspense)
- Soundtrack(s): Chander Pahar (2013); Amazon Obhijaan (2017)

Chander Pahar is an Indian Bengali language franchise consisting of novels, graphic novels and a film series. The original work is a 1937 novel named Chander Pahar, written by Bibhutibhushan Bandyopadhyay. It was translated to English in 2002 by Santanu Sinha Choudhuri and Pradeep Kumar Sinha, published by Orient Blackswan. The English version of the novel was titled Mountain of the Moon. Bandyopadhyay’s story was adapted into a Graphic novel and a live-action film in 2013. A sequel to the 2013 film Amazon Obhijaan, written by the director of the first film Kamaleswar Mukherjee, is released in Christmas 2017.

== Original novel Chander Pahar (1937) ==
=== Plot ===
This novel tells the story of an ordinary young Bengali man, Shankar Roy Chowdhury, as he adventures in Africa in the years 1909 and 1910. After graduating from college at 20-years-old, his family's financial struggles almost force him take a job in a jute mill in Shyamnagar — a prospect he absolutely loathes.

Because loves the subject of geography, he wants to follow the footsteps of renowned explorers like Livingstone, Mungo Park, and Marco Polo. He wants to explore the wilderness, passionate for learning about African forests and animals. By a stroke of luck, he gets a job as a clerk at the Uganda Railway and rushes to Africa without a second thought.

After a few months laying rail tracks, he encounters the first of many dangers in pre-World War I Africa: a man-eating lion. Later, he takes up a job as station-master in a desolate station amidst the Veldts, where he to narrowly escapes a deadly black mamba. While at this post, Shankar encounters, rescues and nurses Diego Alvarez, a middle-age Portuguese explorer and gold/diamond prospector. Alvarez's arrival becomes a turning point in Shankar's life.

While recovering, Alvarez describes his exploits in Africa with his friend Jim Carter. He explains that, lured by the prospect of a priceless yellow diamond from a Kaafi village chief, Alvarez and Carter searched for these yellow diamond caves, on the Mountain of the Moon (Chander Pahar) in the Richtersveld. Rumors suggested a mythical monster, the Bunyip, guards the mine. The explorers set off into the dense jungle, much against the villagers' advice, and Carter was gruesomely killed, supposedly by the Bunyip.

Shankar, inspired by Alvarez's exploits, resigns from his job and accompanies Alvarez to venture again for the mines. They meet hardships, like a raging volcano. Eventually, they get lost in the forests where Alvarez is killed by the Bunyip. Demoralised, Shankar tries to return to civilization. He finds the Bunyip's cave and the diamond mines by accident. Almost getting lost, he finds the remains of the Italian explorer, Attilio Gatti, and learns that the cave is in fact the diamond mine.

Leaving, he becomes lost in the deserts of Kalahari and nearly dies of thirst. Fortunately, he is rescued by a survey team and taken to a hospital in Salisbury, Rhodesia, from where he sets sail for home. Before going back, he writes his account in a newspaper, earning him money. He names the volcano after Alvarez. He ends the book saying that he will return to the cave one day with a large team, and continue the legacy of Alvarez, Carter, and Gatti.

== Sequels by other writers ==
- Writer Partha De has written two of the novels featuring Shankar as the protagonist. Name of those novels are - Chander Upatyaka and Rajhangsir Sarobar. In both novel another character Prasad Das Bandyopadhyay from the original novel also featured along with Shankar Roy Chowdhury. Later in 2017, two of the novels were published in a collection book named Chander Upatyaka by Prativas Prakashan.

=== Chander Upatyaka (2015) ===
Prasad Das Bandyopadhyay is now at Brazil and doing rubber business. Where Shankar was called by him to take a part in that business. Soon Shankar finds that he has been called here for a different reason. He learns, the treasure of last Inca king Atahualpa was hidden somewhere in Amazon. He tries to explore the place.

=== Rajhangsir Sarobar (2017) ===
Prasad Das Bandyopadhyay is now in a Russian jail. A mysterious lady invites Shankar to Russia to help Prasad Das. After arriving at Russia Shankar gets involved in a conspiracy, which might lead to a worldwide devastation.

== Characters ==
=== Introduced in Chander Pahar ===
- Shankar Roy Chowdhury — The hero of the story, a young man from a village in Bengal. He is a smart, brave person who has a penchant for adventures.
- Diego Alvarez — A Portuguese explorer. He is a friend and mentor to Shankar, and together they explore the deepest reaches of Richtersveld for the Mountain of the Moon.
- Jim Carter — A British explorer who was Alvarez's companion in his previous expedition. Alvarez revealed to Shankar that Carter was killed by the Bunyip while he and Carter were exploring the Mountains of the Moon.
- Attilio Gatti — An Italian explorer. He discovered the diamond mine caves in c. 1879 but dies in a cave (later discovered by Shankar) on his way back, in the hands of his traitorous followers.
- Prasad Das Bandyopadhyay
- Rameswar Mukhopadhyay
- Shankar's mother
- Shankar's father

=== Introduced in Chander Upatyaka ===
- Suarez
- Miguel
- Bruno
- Buendia
- Carvalho

=== Introduced in Rajhangsir Sarobar ===
- Dr. Marojov
- Mikhail
- Vasilisa
- Dr. Jing

== Graphic novels ==
Moon Mountain
- Date: 15 Feb 2014
- Page count: 160 pages
- Publisher: Penguin India

Creative team
- Writers: Bibhutibhushan Bandyopadhyay; Saurav Mohapatra (essay)
- Artist: Sayan Mukherjee
- Creator: Bibhutibhushan Bandyopadhyay

Original publication
- Language: English
- ISBN: 9780143332589

=== Moon Mountain (2014) ===
Moon Mountain is a 2014 Graphic novel adapted from Bibhutibhushan Bandyopadhyay's classic Chander Pahar. The graphic novel is published by Penguin Books India, has its script written by Saurav Mohapatra with illustrations by Sayan Mukherjee

=== Amazon Obhijaan (2017) ===
Amazon Obhijaan is a 2017 Graphic novel based on the film of the same name. The graphic novel is written by film's director Kamaleswar Mukherjee, and available in two languages - English and Bengali. The graphic novel acts as a promotional activity for the film. It is released on 11 November 2017.

== Films ==
=== Chander Pahar (2013) ===
A film based on the novel, directed by Kamaleshwar Mukherjee was released on 20 December 2013 (27 December 2013 in all over India). The film, poorly received by critics and the Bengali audience, was produced by Shree Venkatesh Films and has been shot on locations across Africa. It was reportedly being made with a budget of nearly ₹150 million (US$1.6 million), making it one of the most expensive in the Bengali film industry.

Director Kamaleshwar Mukherjee mentioned Chander Pahar as his "Dream Project". The film has reportedly incorporated CGI and visual effects at par with Hollywood and Bollywood standards. Dev plays the role of the main protagonist, Shankar. Most of the other cast members are from South Africa. According to the crew members, it took a considerable time to decide who would play the role of Diego Alvarez, and South African actor Gérard Rudolf was selected. The first theatrical trailer of the film was released by Shree Venkatesh Films, at the Kolkata Nicco park on 14 November 2013.

Shooting locations include Kruger National Park, the mountains of Drakensberg, and the deserts of Kalahari.

=== Amazon Obhijaan (2017) ===
According to a Bengali magazine, director Kamaleshwar Mukherjee is already penning the script, taking the story forward from where it left and Dev has been quoted as saying that the next location, after the African safari, will be the dense forests of Amazon rainforest. The film has been titled Amazon Obhijan.

The story of the film is original, written by Kamaleshwar Mukherjee with some character reprising their roles from the original Chander Pahar. Reportedly it will be made with a budget of whopping ₹20 crores.

The shooting of this film has been started from May 2016 and ended in July 2017.

=== Shankar's Next Adventure (TBA) ===
A sequel to Amazon Obhijaan is instantly announced after the release of the film. Commonly referred as Shankar's Next Adventure the film announced along with 24 more films of 3 upcoming years.

=== Cast and characters ===
| Character | Film | | |
| Character | Chander Pahar (2013) | Amazon Obhijaan (2017) | Shankar's Next Adventure (TBA) |
|---|---|---|---|
| Shankar Roy Chowdhury | Dev | Dev | Dev |
| Shankar’s mother | Laboni Sarkar | Laboni Sarkar | Laboni Sarkar |
| Shankar’s father | Tamal Roy Chowdhury | Tamal Roy Chowdhury (Photo only) | |
| Diego Alvarez | Gérard Rudolf | Mentioned only | |
| Jim Carter | Martin Cito Otto | | |
| Turumal Appa | Nabeel Khan | | |
| Attilio Gatti | Andrew Stock | | |
| Albuquerque | David James (cameo) | | |
| Zulu Chief | Peter Moruakgomo | | |
| Zulu King | Matthew Monika | | |
| Patel | Rafiq Jibhay | | |
| Prasad Das | Keith Gendagoo | | |
| Dan Mabiru | Luthuli Dlamini | | |
| Masai Chief | Ramambila Muladelo | | |
| Bunyip | Animated character | | |
| Marco Florian | | David James | |
| Ankoma | | Eduardo Munniz | |
| Anna Florian | | Svetlana Gulakova | |
| Doctor | | Augusto Cesar | |

=== Crew ===
| Occupation | Film | |
| Occupation | Chander Pahar (2013) | Amazon Obhijaan (2017) |
|---|---|---|
| Director | Kamaleswar Mukherjee | Kamaleswar Mukherjee |
| Producer(s) | Mahendra Soni; Shrikant Mohta | Mahendra Soni; Shrikant Mohta |
| Screenplay | Kamaleswar Mukherjee | Kamaleswar Mukherjee |
| Story | Bibhutibhushan Bandyopadhyay | Kamaleswar Mukherjee |
| Composer(s) | Indraadip Das Gupta; Debojyoti Mishra | Indraadip Das Gupta |
| Cinematography | Soumik Haldar | Soumik Haldar |
| Editor | Raviranjan Maitra | Raviranjan Maitra |

=== Release and revenue ===
| Film | Release date | Budget | Box office revenue |
|---|---|---|---|
| Chander Pahar | 20 December 2013 | ₹150 million (US$1.6 million) | ₹200 million (US$2.1 million) |
| Amazon Obhijaan | 22 December 2017 | ₹200 million (US$2.1 million) | ₹486.3 million (US$5.0 million) |
| Total | | ₹350 million (US$3.6 million) Two films | ₹686.3 million (US$7.1 million) Two films |

== Awards and nominations ==
=== Chander Pahar ===
| Year | Award name | Result |
|---|---|---|
| 2014 | Filmfare Awards East for Best Film – Bengali | Won |
| 2014 | Filmfare Awards East for People's Choice Best Actor – Global - (Dev) for Mountains of the moon | Won |
| 2014 | Filmfare Awards East for Best Director – Bengali - Kamaleshwar Mukherjee | Nominated |
| 2014 | Filmfare Awards East for Best Actor Male – Bengali - (Dev) | Nominated |
| 2014 | Tollywood National Award for Best film | Won |
| 2014 | Tollywood National Award for Best film in critics | Won |
| 2014 | Tollywood National Award for Best Actor (Male) (Dev) | Won |
| 2014 | Star Jalsha Entertainment Award for Best Film of the year | Won |
| 2014 | Star Jalsha Entertainment Award for Best Actor (Dev) | Won |
| 2014 | Zee Bangla Gourab Somman Awards for Biggest Superhit film of the year | Won |
| 2014 | Zee Bangla Gourab Somman Awards for Best Actor (Male) (Dev) | Won |
| 2014 | Zee Bangla Gourab Somman Awards for Best Director Kamaleshwar Mukherjee | Won |
| 2014 | Kalakar Awards for Best Actor (Dev) | Won |
| 2014 | Kalakar Awards for Best Film | Won |
| 2014 | Kalakar Awards for Best Director (Kamaleshwar Mukherjee) | Won |
