= List of highest-grossing Indian Bengali films =

Cinema of West Bengal, commonly known as Indian Bengali cinema or Tollywood, is based in the Tollygunge region of Kolkata, West Bengal, and is dedicated to the production of films in the Bengali-language. The Indian Bengali film industry has been known by the nickname Tollywood, a blend word of the words Tollygunge and Hollywood, since 1932. In the 1930s, West Bengal was the centre of Indian cinema, and Indian Bengali cinema accounted for a quarter of India's film output in the 1950s. A 2014 industry report noted that while approximately 100 films were produced annually in Bengali. The Indian Bengali film industry, which was valued at around ₹150-170 crore in terms of revenue in 2017, has decreased over the years to ₹66 crore in 2023.

This ranking lists the highest-grossing Indian Bengali films produced by Bengali cinema, based on conservative global box office estimates as reported by organizations classified as green by Wikipedia. (Note: See WP:RSP, WP:ICTFSOURCES) The figures are not adjusted for inflation.

== Key ==
Background shading indicates that a film, or at least one from a series, is currently showing in theatres worldwide.

== Highest-grossing films worldwide ==
Rank	Title	Year	Worldwide gross	Ref
1	Amazon Obhijaan	2017	₹48.63–50 crore	(Note: Amazon Obhijaan's reported box office varies between ₹48.53 crore (The Statesman) – ₹50 crore (Hindustan Times and Indian Express))
2	Dhumketu	2025	₹28.07 crore	
3	Khadaan	2024	₹25−26 crore	
4	Chander Pahar	2013	₹22.5 crore	
5	Bohurupi	2024	₹21.24 crore	(Note: In India, including West Bengal, the net income is calculated by subtracting GST from the gross income of the film. The net income of the film is 18 crores, resulting in a gross income of almost 21.24 crores, including 18% GST.)
6	Projapoti	2022	₹13–14 crore	
7	Raghu Dakat	2025	₹13 crore	
8	Boss 2: Back to Rule	2017	₹10.5 crore	
9	Pather Panchali	1955	₹10 crore	
10	Paglu	2011	₹9.95–10 crore	
11	Sathi	2002	₹9.82 crore	
12	Karnasubarner Guptodhon	2022	₹9.8 crore	
13	Poran Jai Joliya Re	2009	₹9.5 crore	
14	Rangbaaz	2013	₹9 crore	
15	Game: He Plays to Win	2014	₹8.95 crore	
16	Chaamp	2017	₹8.9 crore	
17	Praktan	2016	₹8.5 crore	
18	Khoka 420	2013	₹8 crore	
19	Mishawr Rawhoshyo	2017	₹7.5 crore	
20	Posto	2017	₹7 crore	
21	Boss: Born to Rule	2013	₹6.75 crore	
22	Durgeshgorer Guptodhon	2019	₹6.5 crore	

== Highest-grossing films by opening week ==
Rank	Title	Worldwide gross	Year	Ref.
1	Dhumketu	₹18 crore	2025	(Note: In India, including West Bengal, the net income is calculated by subtracting GST from the gross income of the film. The net income of the film is 15.24 crores, resulting in a gross income of almost 18 crores, including 18% GST.)
2	Khadaan	₹7.26 crore	2024	
3	Raghu Dakat	₹6 crore	2025	(Note: In India, including West Bengal, the net income is calculated by subtracting GST from the gross income of the film. The net income of the film is ₹5.1 crores, resulting in a gross income of almost ₹6 crores, including 18% GST.)
4	Amazon Obhijaan	₹5.50 crore	2017	
5	Karnasubarner Guptodhon	₹5.50 crore	2022	
6	Bohurupi	₹5.24 crore	2024	
7	Chander Pahar	₹4.83 crore	2012	
8	Rangbaaz	₹4.5 crore	2013	
9	Dawshom Awbotaar	₹4.25 crore	2023	
10	The Eken: Benaras e Bibhishika	₹2.85 crore	2025	

== Highest-grossing films by year ==
Year	Title	Domestic net	Director	Ref.
1932	Palli Samaj	₹44 lakh (₹937 crore in February 2025)	Sisir Bhaduri	
1933	Seeta	₹41 lakh	Sisir Bhaduri	
1934	Dhruba	₹88 lakh (₹1667 crore in February 2025)	Kazi Nazrul Islam and Satyendranath Dey	
1935	Devdas	₹41 lakh	Pramathesh Barua	
1936	Grihadah	₹44 lakh	Pramathesh Barua	
1937	Vidyapati	₹77 lakh	Debaki Bose	
1938	Gora	₹44 lakh	Naresh Mitra	
1939	Chanakya	₹50 lakh	Sisir Bhaduri	
1940	Nartaki	₹88 lakh	Debaki Bose	
1941	Abatar	₹50 lakh	Premankur Atorthy	
1942	Shesh Uttar	₹41 lakh	Pramathesh Barua	
1943	Dikshul	₹40 lakh	Premankur Atorthy	
1944	Pratikar	₹47 lakh	Chhabi Biswas	
1945	Dui Purush	₹80 lakh	Subodh Mitra	
1946	Vande Mataram	₹40 lakh	Sudhir bandhu Bannerjee	
1947	Noukadubi	₹88 lakh	Naresh Chandra Mitra	
1948	Kalo Chhaya	₹50 lakh	Premendra Mitra	
1949	Kuasha	₹51 lakh	Premendra Mitra	
1950	Vidyasagar	₹55 lakh	Kali Prasad Ghosh	
1951	Barjatri	₹60 lakh	Satyen Bose	
1952	Pasher Bari	₹50 lakh	Sudhir Mukherjee	
1953	Sharey Chuattor	₹65 lakh	Nirmal Dey	
1954	Agni Pariksha	₹72 lakh	Agradoot	
1955	Pather Panchali	₹10 crore	Satyajit Ray	
1956	Saheb Bibi Golam	₹68 lakh	Kartik Chatterjee	
1957	Harano Sur	₹77 lakh	Ajoy Kar	
1958	Indrani	₹70 lakh	Niren Lahiri	
1959	Deep Jwele Jaai	₹1 crore	Asit Sen (director)	
1960	Meghe Dhaka Tara	₹70 lakh	Ritwik Ghatak	
1961	Saptapadi	₹10 crore	Ajoy Kar	
1962	Bipasha	₹75 lakh	Agradoot	
1963	Deya Neya	₹78 lakh	Sunil Banerjee	
1964	Lal Pathore	₹75 lakh	Sushil Mazumder	
1965	Thana Theke Aschi	₹70 lakh	Hiren Nag	
1966	Nayak	₹80 lakh	Satyajit Ray	
1967	Antony Firingee	₹87 lakh	Sunil Bannerjee	
1968	Chowringhee	₹80 lakh	Pinaki Bhushan Mukherjee	
1969	Goopy Gyne Bagha Byne	₹88 lakh	Satyajit Ray	
1970	Nishi Padma	₹85 lakh	Arabinda Mukhopadhyay	
1971	Nimantran	₹85 lakh	Tarun Majumdar	
1972	Mem Saheb	₹82 lakh	Pinaki Mukherjee	
1973	Titash Ekti Nadir Naam	₹1.23 lakh	Ritwik Ghatak	
1974	Mouchak	₹1.8 crore	Arabinda Mukhopadhyay	
1975	Sanyasi Raja	₹85 lakh	Pijush Bose	
1976	Datta	₹75 lakh	Ajoy Kar	
1977	Baba Taraknath	₹70 lakh	Sunil Bandyopadhyay, Baren Chatterjee, Shanti Ranjan Ghosh Dastidar	
1978	Ganadevata	₹50 lakh	Tarun Majumdar	
1979	Joi Baba Felunath	₹70 lakh	Satyajit Ray	
1980	Hirak Rajar Deshe	₹90 lakh	Satyajit Ray	
1981	Ogo Bodhu Shundori	₹1 crore	Salil Dutta	
1982	Troyee	₹29 lakh	Gautam Mukherjee	
1983	Protidan	₹70 lakh	Prabhat Roy	
1984	Shatru	₹70 lakh	Anjan Choudhury	
1985	Bhalobasa Bhalobasa	₹78 lakh	Tarun Majumdar	
1986	Pathbhola	₹21 lakh	Tarun Majumdar	
1987	Guru Dakshina	₹86 lakh	Anjan Choudhury	
1988	Chhoto Bou	₹85 lakh	Anjan Choudhury	
1989	Asha O Bhalobasha	₹88 lakh	Sujit Guha	
1990	Devota	₹88 lakh	Abhijit Sen	
1991	Beder Meye Josna	₹90 lakh	Tojammel Haque Bokul	
1992	Mon Mane Na	₹98.57 lakh	Indar Sen	
1993	Padma Nadir Majhi	₹30 lakh	Goutam Ghose	
1994	Rakta Nadir Dhara	₹88 lakh	Ram Mukherjee	
1995	Sangharsha	₹95 lakh	Haranath Chakraborty	
1996	Bhai Amar Bhai	₹1 crore	Swapan Saha	
1997	Bakul Priya	₹1.8 crore	Swapan Saha	
1998	Raja Rani Badsha	₹1 crore	Haranath Chakraborty	
1999	Jibon Niye Khela	₹1 crore	Anjan Choudhury	
2000	Sasurbari Zindabad	₹2.5 crore	Haranath Chakraborty	
2001	Pratibad	₹2 crore	Haranath Chakraborty	
2002	Sathi	₹9.80 crore	Haranath Chakraborty	
2003	Guru	₹1.88 crore	Swapan Saha	
2004	Bandhan	₹5 crore	Ravi Kinagi	
2005	Yuddho	₹3.5 crore	Ravi Kinagi	
2006	MLA Fatakeshto	₹7.5 crore	Swapan Saha	
2007	I Love You	₹3 crore	Ravi Kinagi	
2008	Mon Mane Na	₹3.5 crore	Sujit Guha	
2009	Paran Jai Jalia Re	₹9.5 crore	Ravi Kinagi	
2010	Shedin Dekha Hoyechilo	₹12.50 crore	Sujit Mondal	
2011	Paglu	₹9.95 crore	Rajiv Kumar Biswas	
2012	Awara	₹8.5 crore	Ravi Kinagi	
2013	Chander Pahar	₹21 crore	Kamaleshwar Mukherjee	
2014	Game	₹8.95 crore	Baba Yadav	
2015	Shudhu Tomari Jonno	₹6.50 crore	Birsa Dasgupta	
2016	Praktan	₹8.5 crore	Nandita Roy, Shiboprosad Mukherjee	
2017	Amazon Obhijaan	₹48.63 crore	Kamaleshwar Mukherjee	
2018	Haami	₹6 crore	Nandita Roy, Shiboprosad Mukherjee	
2019	Durgeshgorer Guptodhon	₹6 crore	Dhrubo Banerjee	
2020	Dwitiyo Purush	₹5 crore	Srijit Mukherji	
2021	Tonic	₹7 crore	Avijit Sen	
2022	Projapoti	₹13 crore	Avijit Sen	
2023	Chengiz	₹6.75 crore	Rajesh Ganguly	
2024	Khadaan	₹26 crore	Soojit Rino Dutta	
2025	Dhumketu	₹28.07 crore	Kaushik Ganguly	(Note: In India, including West Bengal, the net income is calculated by subtracting GST from the gross income of the film. The net income of the film is 23.79 crores, resulting in a gross income of almost 28.07 crores, including 18% GST.)
2026	Saptadingar Guptodhon	₹10.5 core	Dhrubo Banerjee	

== Highest-grossing franchises ==
Highest-grossing franchises

Rank	Franchise	Worldwide gross (crore) (Note: The franchise gross is calculated using the lowest reported gross for each film in the franchise.)	No. of films	Average gross (crore)	Highest grosser

1	Chander Pahar	₹68.63	2	₹34	Amazon Obhijaan (₹48.63 crore)
1	Amazon Obhijaan (2017)	₹48.63			
2	Chander Pahar (2013) (Note: Chander Pahar's reported worldwide grosses vary between ₹15 crore (The Indian Express) – ₹16.53 crore (The Statesman))	₹20			

2	Goenda Shabor	₹17.78	4	₹4	Aschhe Abar Shabor (₹7.7 crore)
1	Tirandaj Shabor (2022)	₹3.2			
2	Aschhe Abar Shabor (2018)	₹7.7			
3	Eagoler Chokh (2016)	₹5.76			
4	Ebar Shabor (2015)	₹1.12			

3	Guptodhon Series	₹30.3	3	₹10	Saptadingar Guptodhon (₹10.5 crore)
1	Saptadingar Guptodhon (2026)	₹10.5			
2	Karnasubarner Guptodhon (2022)	₹9.8			
3	Durgeshgorer Guptodhon (2019)	₹6			
4	Guptodhoner Sandhane (2018)	₹4			

4	Feluda Theatrical Films	₹18.91	11	₹2	Badshahi Angti (₹4 crore)
1	Badshahi Angti (2014)	₹4			
2	Hatyapuri (2022)	₹2.56			
3	Royal Bengal Rahashya (2011)	₹2.25			
4	Bombaiyer Bombete (2003)	₹2			
5	Kailashey Kelenkari (2007)	₹2			
6	Nayan Rahasya (2024)	₹1.4			
7	Tintorettor Jishu (2008)	₹1.25			
8	Gorosthaney Sabdhan (2010)	₹1			
9	Double Feluda (2016)	₹1			
10	Sonar Kella (1974)	₹0.75			
11	Joi Baba Felunath (1979)	₹0.7			

5	Srijit Mukherji's Cop Universe	₹18.5	4	₹5	Dawshom Awbotaar (₹7.5 crore)
1	Dawshom Awbotaar (2023)	₹7.5			
2	Dwitiyo Purush (2020)	₹5			
3	Vinci Da (2019)	₹3			
4	Baishe Srabon (2011)	₹3			

6	Boss	₹17.25	2	₹9	Boss 2: Back to Rule (₹10.50 crore)
1	Boss 2: Back to Rule (2017)	₹10.50			
2	Boss: Born to Rule (2013)	₹6.75			

7	Khokababu	₹15.15	2	₹8	Khoka 420 (₹8.2 crore)
1	Khoka 420 (2013)	₹8			
2	Khokababu (2012)	₹7.15			

8	Ekenbabu Theatrical Films	₹9.35	3	₹3	The Eken: Ruddhaswas Rajasthan (₹3.5 crore)
1	The Eken: Benaras e Bibhishika (2025)	₹2.85			
2	The Eken: Ruddhaswas Rajasthan (2023)	₹3.5			
3	The Eken (2022)	₹3.0			

9	Challenge	₹14.2	2	₹7	Challenge 2 (₹7.7 crore)
1	Challenge 2 (2012)	₹7.7			
2	Challenge (2009)	₹6.50			

10	Srijit Mukherji's Kakababu	₹14	3	₹5	Yeti Obhijaan (₹5 crore)
1	Kakababur Protyaborton (2022)	₹2			
2	Yeti Obhijaan (2017)	₹5			
3	Mishawr Rawhoshyo (2013)	₹7			

11	The Apu Trilogy	₹12.8	3	₹4	Pather Panchali (₹12 crore)
1	The World of Apu (1959)	₹1.4			
2	Aparajito (1956)	₹1.4			
3	Pather Panchali (1955)	₹10			

12	Paglu	₹11.5	2	₹6	Paglu (₹10)
1	Paglu 2 (2012)	₹6.5			
2	Paglu (2011) (Note: Paglu's reported worldwide grosses vary between ₹5 crore (The Indian Express) – 9.95 crore (The Statesman))	₹5			

13	Bela Films	₹6.68	2	₹3	Belashuru (₹4.38 crore)
1	Belashuru (2022)	₹4.38			
2	Bela Seshe (2015)	₹2.3			

14	Haami	₹8	2	₹4	Haami (₹5 crore)
1	Haami 2 (2022)	₹3			
2	Haami (2018)	₹5			

15	Cheeni	₹2.67	2	₹1	Cheeni (₹2.2 crore)
1	Cheeni 2 (2023)	₹0.47			
2	Cheeni (2020)	₹2.2			

== See also ==
- List of highest-grossing Bengali films
- Cinema of West Bengal
- Lists of Bengali films
- List of highest-grossing Indian films
  - List of highest-grossing Hindi films
  - List of highest-grossing Marathi films
  - List of highest-grossing Punjabi-language films
  - List of highest-grossing South Indian films
    - List of highest-grossing Kannada films
    - List of highest-grossing Malayalam films
    - List of highest-grossing Tamil films
    - List of highest-grossing Telugu films
- List of highest-grossing films in India
- Hyderabad Bengali Film Festival
- Kolkata International Film Festival
