= Mountains of the Moon =

Mountains of the Moon may refer to:

- Mountains of the Moon (Africa), a legendary mountain range once thought to be the source of the Nile River in Uganda
- Mountains of the Moon (film), a 1990 film about a search for the source of the Nile
- Mountains of the Moon University, Uganda
- List of mountains on the Moon, mountains on Luna
- Mountains Of The Moon, or O Desejado, a 1987 Portuguese-French film
- Mountains of the Moon, or Chander Pahar, a 2013 Indian film
- "Mountains of the Moon", a 1969 song by the Grateful Dead from Aoxomoxoa
- Mountains of the Moon, the original working title for Mark Hollis's 1998 album Mark Hollis
- Mountain of the Moon, or Chander Pahar, a 1937 novel by Bibhutibhushan Bandopadhyay
