= Laboni Sarkar =

Bengali film actress

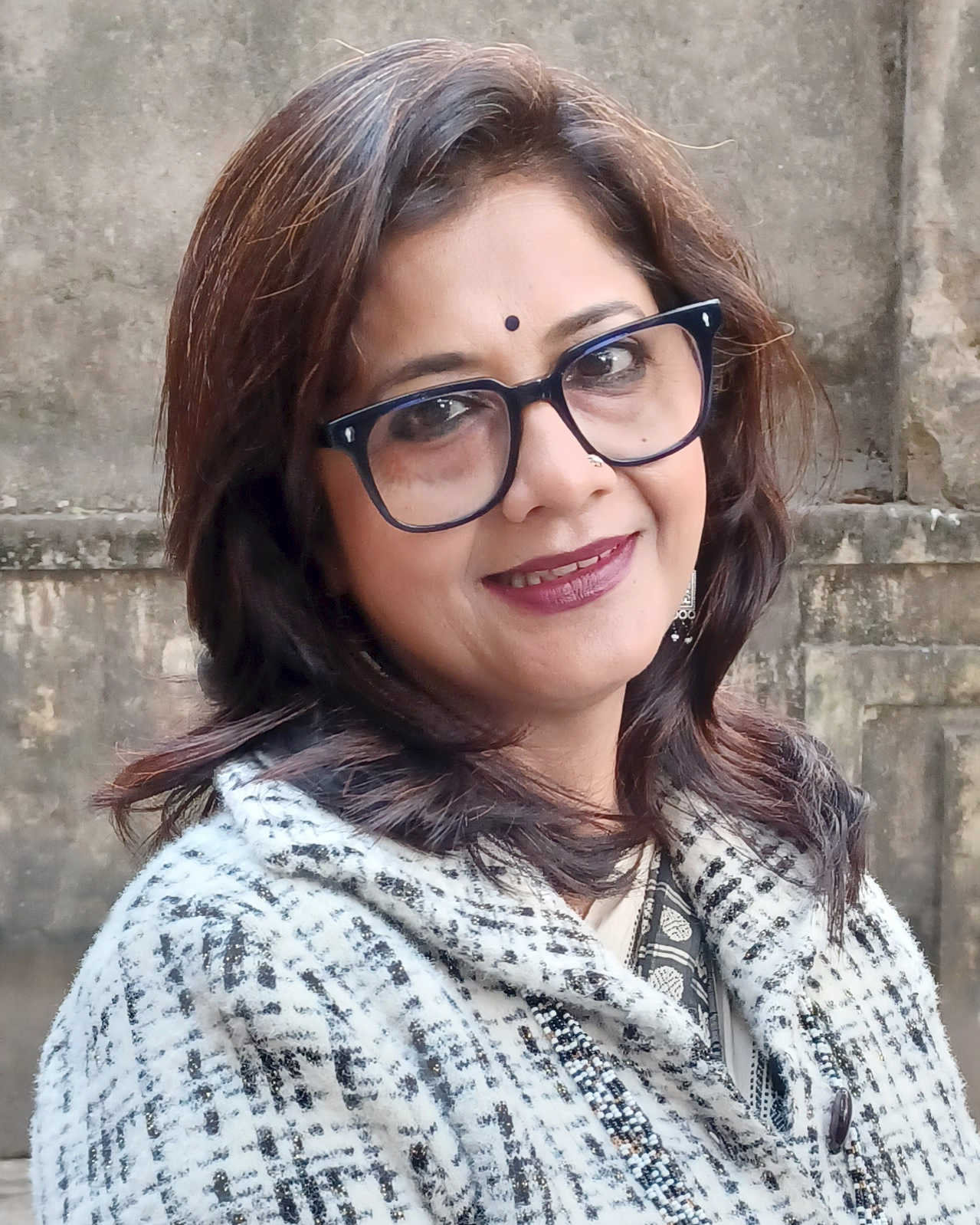
- Sarkar at AF Awards in 2024
- Born: 26 October; Kolkata, West Bengal, India
- Education: Jadavpur University
- Occupation: Actress
- Years active: 1986–present
- Spouse: Kaushik Banerjee (m. 1997)
- Parents: Mukul Kanti Sarkar (father); Krishna Sarkar (mother)
- Awards: BFJA Awards

Laboni Sarkar is an Indian actress who is known for her work in Bengali cinema. She is the recipient of three BFJA Awards. She began her acting career in a Bengali TV series by Jochon Dastidar. She made her Big screen debut in Aparna Sen's Sati (1989).Sarkar has acted in more than a 50 movies including Chander Bari by Tarun Majumdar, Charachar by Buddhadev Dasgupta, Ami Shubhash Bolchi by Mahesh Manjrekar, Kichhhu Sanlap Kichhu Pralap by Ashoke Viswanathan, Chander Pahar by Kamaleshwar Mukherjee

== Awards ==
Award	Year	Category	Work			Result	Ref.
Award	Year	Category	Stage adaptation	Film	TV series	Result	Ref.
Bengal Film Journalists' Association Awards	1994	Best Actress		Kancher Prithibi		Won	
Bengal Film Journalists' Association Awards	1995	Best Actress		Wheel Chair		Won	
Bengal Film Journalists' Association Awards	1996	Best Actress		Charachar		Won	
Kalakar Awards	1993	Best Actress			Bishbrikshya	Won	
Kalakar Awards	1994	Best Actress	Ujan Ganga			Won	
Kalakar Awards	1999	Best Actress			Mohini	Won	
West Bengal Tele Academy Awards	2022	Best Actress (Supporting role)				Won	

== Filmography ==
=== Films ===
Key
†	Denotes films that have not yet been released

Year	Title	Roles	Note	Ref.
1989	Sati			
1992	Nabarupa			
1993	Kancher Prithibi			
1994	Bhalobasar Ashray			
1994	Wheel Chair			
1994	Ponthan Mada			
1995	Charachar			
1995	Sangharsha			
1997	Dabidar			
1997	Nayantara			
1999	Kichhhu Sanlap Kichhu Pralap			
2000	Aasroy			
2001	Dada Thakur			
2001	Pratibad			
2002	Kurukshetra			
2003	Guru			
2003	Katha Deithili Maa Ku (Odia film)			
2003	Sabuj Saathi			
2004	Badsha The King			
2005	Agnipath			
2005	Shubhodrishti			
2005	Kaalpurush	Putul		
2006	Hungama			
2007	Chander Bari			
2007	Kalishankar (Bengali /Odia) Bilingual flim			
2008	Rajkumar			
2008	Mahakaal			
2008	Bhalobasa Bhalobasa			
2008	Aamar Pratigya			
2008	Janmadata			
2009	Aparadhi			
2009	Prem Amar			
2009	Paran Jai Jaliya Re	Anna's Mother		
2009	Saat Paake Bandha			
2009	Maa Amar Maa			
2009	Challenge	Abhi's Mother		
2010	Josh			
2010	Le Chakka	as Abir's Mother		
2010	Mon Je Kore Uru Uru			
2011	Romeo	Sidhu's Mother		
2011	Kashmakash			
2012	Ami Shubhash Bolchi			
2012	Challenge 2	Pooja's Mother		
2012	Khokababu	Khoka's Mother		
2013	Chander Pahar	Shankar's mother		
2013	Chupi Chupi			
2013	Dekha, Na-Dekhay			
2013	Khiladi			
2013	Khoka 420	Krrish's Mother		
2014	Bangali Babu English Mem			
2014	Obhishopto Nighty			
2015	Hriday Haran			
2015	Jomer Raja Dilo Bor			
2016	Haripad Bandwala	Nandalal's Wife		
2017	Amazon Obhijaan	Shankar's mother		
2017	Chaamp	Shibaji's mother		
2017	Shrestha Bangali			
2017	Tomake Chai			
2018	Boxer			
2018	Hiralal			
2018	Maati			
2019	Parineeta			
2021	Kolkatar Harry			
2022	Aporajeyo			
2022	Oti Uttam			
2023	Oh! Lovely			
2025	Jhumur			

=== TV series ===
Year	Title	Roles	Channel	Ref.
1988	Sei Samay		DD Bangla	
1993	Bishbrikkha			
1993	Pratibimba			
2015 – 2017	Icche Nodi	Malobika Banerjee	Star Jalsha	
2017 – 2018	Sanyashi Raja	Iraboti Sen	Star Jalsha	
2018 – 2019	Mayurpankhi	Mitali Bose	Star Jalsha	
2018 – 2019	Phagun Bou	Mayurakshi Ghosh	Star Jalsha	
	Mrs Sinha Roy	Dayamanti Sinha Roy	Sananda TV	
2021 – 2022	Falna	Ashalata Banerjee	Star Jalsha	
2022	Uron Tubri	Sabitri Banerjee	Zee Bangla	

=== Web series ===
Year	Title	Roles	Ref.
2022	Sampurna	Aloka Sanyal	
2023	Rokto Karobi		

== See also ==
- Anashua Majumdar
- Rita Dutta Chakraborty
- Paran Bandopadhyay
- Tanima Sen
