= Diego Álvarez =

Diego Álvarez may refer to:

- a mistaken name in some 19th-century English sources for Gough Island
- Diego Álvarez Chanca (c. 1463–c. 1515), doctor who accompanied Christopher Columbus
- Diego Álvarez Benítez (1812–1899), Mexican general
- Diego Álvarez (footballer) (born 1981), Colombian footballer
- Diego Álvarez (tennis) (born 1980), Argentine tennis player
- Diego Álvarez (theologian) (c. 1558–1635), Spanish theologian and bishop of Trani
- Diego Betancur Álvarez (born 1949), Colombian ambassador to Australia and New Zealand
- Diego Alvarez (Chander Pahar), a fictional character in the novel Chander Pahar

== See also ==
- Caramuru (Diogo Álvares Correia, c. 1475–1557), Portuguese adventurer
- José Diego Álvarez (disambiguation)
