= List of highest-grossing Bengali films =

The following is a list of the highest-grossing Bengali-language films produced worldwide, including commercial releases from Dhallywood (Bangladesh) and Tollywood (India).

== Global gross figures ==
In this chart, films are ranked by the revenues from theatrical exhibition at their nominal value, along with the highest positions they attained.

Rank	Title	Year	Worldwide gross (in BDT/INR with USD)	Country of origin	Ref
1	Borbaad	2025	৳105 crore (US$8.6 million)	Bangladesh	
2	Toofan	2024	৳56 crore (US$4.6 million)	Bangladesh	
3	Amazon Obhijaan	2017	₹49 crore (equivalent to ₹75 crore or US$7.8 million in 2026)	India	(Note: Amazon Obhijaan's reported box office varies between ₹48.53 crore (The Statesman) – ₹50 crore (Hindustan Times and Indian Express))
4	Priyotoma	2023	৳44 crore (equivalent to ৳49 crore or US$4.0 million in 2024)	Bangladesh	
5	Taandob	2025	৳30 crore (US$2.4 million)	Bangladesh	
6	Dhumketu	2025	₹28.07 crore (equivalent to ₹29 crore or US$3.0 million in 2026)	India	(Note: In India, including West Bengal, the net income is calculated by subtracting GST from the gross income of the film. The net income of the film is 23.79 crores, resulting in a gross income of almost 28.07 crores, including 18% GST.)
7	Rajkumar	2024	৳26 crore (US$2.1 million)	Bangladesh	
8	Khadaan	2024	₹25.5 crore (equivalent to ₹27 crore or US$2.8 million in 2026)	India	
9	Beder Meye Josna	1989	৳25 crore (equivalent to ৳216 crore or US$18 million in 2024)	Bangladesh	
10	Chander Pahar	2013	₹22.5 crore (equivalent to ₹42 crore or US$4.3 million in 2026)	India	
11	Bohurupi	2024	₹21.24 crore (equivalent to ₹23 crore or US$2.3 million in 2026)	India	(Note: In India, including West Bengal, the net income is calculated by subtracting GST from the gross income of the film. The net income of the film is 18 crores, resulting in a gross income of almost 21.24 crores, including 18% GST.)
12	Ammajan	1999	৳20 crore (equivalent to ৳99 crore or US$8.1 million in 2024)	Bangladesh	
13	Bonolota Express	2026	৳20 crore (US$1.6 million)	Bangladesh	
14	Shopner Thikana	1995	৳19 crore (equivalent to ৳117 crore or US$9.5 million in 2024)	Bangladesh	
15	Hawa	2022	৳16 crore (equivalent to ৳19 crore or US$1.6 million in 2024)	Bangladesh	
16	Daagi	2025	৳16 crore (US$1.3 million)	Bangladesh	
17	Chandni	1991	৳15 crore (equivalent to ৳115 crore or US$9.3 million in 2024)	Bangladesh	
18	Priya Amar Priya	2008	৳15 crore (equivalent to ৳45 crore or US$3.7 million in 2024)	Bangladesh	
19	Surongo	2023	৳15 crore (equivalent to ৳17 crore or US$1.4 million in 2024)	Bangladesh	
20	Projapati	2022	₹14 crore (equivalent to ₹16 crore or US$1.7 million in 2026)	India	
21	Raghu Dakat	2025	₹13 crore (equivalent to ₹13 crore or US$1.4 million in 2026)	India	
22	Utshob	2025	৳13 crore (US$1.1 million)	Bangladesh	
23	Poran	2022	৳12 crore (equivalent to ৳15 crore or US$1.2 million in 2024)	Bangladesh	
24	Sotter Mrittu Nei	1996	৳11.5 crore (equivalent to ৳69 crore or US$5.6 million in 2024)	Bangladesh	
25	Password	2019	৳11 crore (equivalent to ৳16 crore or US$1.3 million in 2024)	Bangladesh	
26	Shanto Keno Mastan	1998	৳10.5 crore (equivalent to ৳55 crore or US$4.5 million in 2024)	Bangladesh	
27	Boss 2: Back to Rule	2017	₹10.5 crore (equivalent to ₹16 crore or US$1.7 million in 2026)	India-Bangladesh	
28	Jongli	2025	৳10.03 crore (US$820,000)	Bangladesh	(Note: According to Prothom Alo, Jongli earned approximately ৳4.05 crore from multiplex ticket sales. However, this figure does not account for single-screen theatres, international markets, or corporate show revenues. As reported by the Bangla Movie Database (BMDB), the distribution company The Abhi Katachitra stated that the film grossed a total of ৳10.03 crore, including income from multiplexes, single screens, overseas screenings, and corporate shows. BMDB is widely recognized as a reliable and frequently cited database for Bangladeshi cinema, offering cross-referenced and production-backed box office data, and is used by film analysts, journalists, and academic publications within the region.)
29	Pather Panchali	1955	₹10 crore (equivalent to ₹12 billion or US$120 million in 2026)	India	
30	Paglu	2011	₹9.95 crore (equivalent to ₹22 crore or US$2.3 million in 2026)	India	
31	Sathi	2002	₹9.8 crore (equivalent to ₹41 crore or US$4.2 million in 2026)	India	
32	Karnasubarner Guptodhon	2022	₹9.8 crore (equivalent to ₹11 crore or US$1.2 million in 2026)	India	
33	Paran Jai Jaliya Re	2009	₹9.5 crore (equivalent to ₹26 crore or US$2.7 million in 2026)	India	
34	Dhaka Attack	2017	৳9.5 crore (equivalent to ৳15 crore or US$1.3 million in 2024)	Bangladesh	
35	Leader: Amie Bangladesh	2023	৳9.5 crore (equivalent to ৳10 crore or US$860,000 in 2024)	Bangladesh	
36	Nabab	2017	৳9.1 crore (equivalent to ৳15 crore or US$1.2 million in 2024)	Bangladesh-India	
37	Rangbaaz	2013	₹9 crore (equivalent to ₹17 crore or US$1.7 million in 2026)	India	
38	Game	2014	₹8.95 crore (equivalent to ₹16 crore or US$1.6 million in 2026)	India	
39	Chaamp	2017	₹8.9 crore (equivalent to ₹14 crore or US$1.4 million in 2026)	India	
40	Dard	2024	৳8.55 crore (US$700,000)	Bangladesh-India	
41	Praktan	2016	₹8.5 crore (equivalent to ₹13 crore or US$1.4 million in 2026)	India	
42	Keyamat Theke Keyamat	1993	৳8.2 crore (equivalent to ৳59 crore or US$4.8 million in 2024)	Bangladesh	
43	Monpura	2009	৳8 crore (equivalent to ৳23 crore or US$1.8 million in 2024)	Bangladesh	
44	Khoka 420	2013	₹8 crore (equivalent to ₹15 crore or US$1.5 million in 2026)	India	
45	Mishawr Rawhoshyo	2013	₹7.5 crore (equivalent to ₹14 crore or US$1.4 million in 2026)	India	
46	Coolie	1997	৳7 crore (equivalent to ৳40 crore or US$3.3 million in 2024)	Bangladesh	
46	Swami Keno Asami	1997	৳7 crore (equivalent to ৳40 crore or US$3.3 million in 2024)	Bangladesh	
47	Posto	2017	₹7 crore (equivalent to ₹11 crore or US$1.1 million in 2026)	India	
48	Boss: Born to Rule	2013	₹6.75 crore (equivalent to ₹13 crore or US$1.3 million in 2026)	India	
49	Durgeshgorer Guptodhon	2019	₹6.5 crore (equivalent to ₹8.8 crore or US$920,000 in 2026)	India	
50	Badsha – The Don	2016	৳6.4 crore (equivalent to ৳11 crore or US$900,000 in 2024)	India-Bangladesh	
