= Eduardo Munniz =

Brazilian actor

Eduardo Muniz is a Brazilian actor and voice artist, best known for his work in television and voice-over projects. He is recognized as one of Brazil's prominent male voice-over artists.

== Career ==
Muniz graduated in acting from Michael Howard Studios in New York City. His Bengali debut film is Amazon Obhijaan, sequel of the movie Chander Pahar, directed by Kamaleshwar Mukherjee. Before appearing this Bengali film he directed theater, performed as voice over artist in The Coca-Cola Company's Campaigns, Volkswagen Brasil, Sundance TV, HSBC Bank like commercial programs. Munniz also worked in the advertisement of various companies like Pepsi, Rolling Stone magazine, Vivo, Honda, GM, Ford, Itaipava etc.
