= Tamal Roy Chowdhury =

Indian actor (1946–2026)

Tamal Roy Chowdhury (1946 – 9 March 2026) was an Indian actor from West Bengal.

Chowdhury acted in popular Bengali films like Challenge, Le Halua Le, Bindass, Amazon Obhijaan and Chander Pahar.

Chowdhury died on 9 March 2026, at the age of 80, due to cardiac arrest at his residence in South Kolkata when he was asleep. He had undergone a pacemaker implantation.
