= Chander Pahar =

1937 adventure novel by Bibhutibhushan Bandopadhyay

- Signet Press edition cover
- Author: Bibhutibhushan Bandopadhyay
- Translators: Santanu Sinha Chaudhuri, Pradeep Kumar Sinha (2002 translation, reprinted 2007)
- Illustrator: Shyamalkrishna Bose
- Cover artist: Satyajit Ray
- Language: Bengali
- Genre: Adventure
- Publisher: M. C. Sircar & Sons Limited (Bengali), Orient Blackswan (English translation, 2002)
- Publication date: 1937
- Publication place: India
- English publication date: 1 July 2002
- Media type: Print (hardback & paperback)
- Pages: 175 pp (Eng. trans. edition)
- ISBN: 978-81-250-3069-0

Chander Pahar (transl. Mountain of the Moon) is a Bengali adventure novel written by Bibhutibhushan Bandopadhyay and published in 1937. The novel follows the adventures of a young Bengali man in the forests of Africa. The novel is one of the most-loved adventure novels in the Bengali literature and is one of Bibhutibhushan's most popular works. It spawned a media franchise.

== Plot summary ==
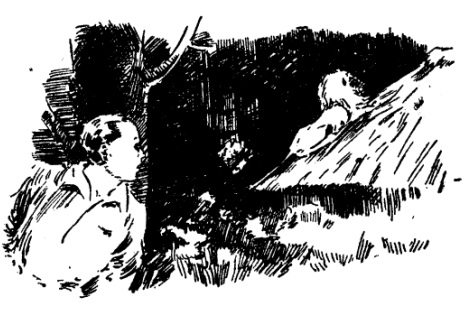
Shankar facing a lion.

This novel tells the story of an ordinary young Bengali man, Shankar Ray Choudhuri, as he adventures in Africa in the years 1909 and 1910. After graduating from college at 20-years-old, his family's financial struggles almost force him take a job in a jute mill in Shyamnagar — a prospect he absolutely loathes.

Shankar loves the subject of geography, he wants to follow the footsteps of renowned explorers like Livingstone, Mungo Park, and Marco Polo. He wants to explore the wilderness, passionate for learning about African forests and animals. By a stroke of luck, he gets a job as a clerk at the Uganda Railway and rushes to Africa without a second thought.

After a few months laying rail tracks, he encounters the first of many dangers in pre-World War I Africa: a man-eating lion. Later, he takes up a job as station-master in a desolate station amidst the Veldts, where he narrowly escapes a deadly black mamba. While at this post, Shankar encounters, rescues and nurses Diego Alvarez, a middle-age Portuguese explorer and gold/diamond prospector. Alvarez's arrival becomes a turning point in Shankar's life.

While recovering, Alvarez describes his exploits in Africa with his friend Jim Carter. He explains that, lured by the prospect of a priceless yellow diamond from a Kaafi village chief, Alvarez and Carter searched for these yellow diamond caves, on the Mountain of the Moon (Chander Pahar) in the Richtersveld. Rumors suggested a mythical monster, the Bunyip, guards the mine. The explorers set off into the dense jungle, much against the villagers' advice, and Carter was gruesomely killed, supposedly by the Bunyip.

Shankar, inspired by Alvarez's exploits, resigns from his job and accompanies Alvarez to venture again for the mines. They meet hardships, like a racist gambler, legends about Dingonek the monster and later, a raging volcano. Eventually, they get lost in the forests where Alvarez is killed by the Bunyip. Demoralised, Shankar tries to return to civilization. He finds the Bunyip's cave and the diamond mines by accident. Almost getting lost, he finds the remains of the Italian explorer, Attilio Gatti, and learns that the cave is in fact the diamond mine.

Leaving, he becomes lost in the deserts of Kalahari and nearly dies of thirst. Fortunately, he is rescued by a survey team and taken to a hospital in Salisbury, Rhodesia, from where he sets sail for home. Before going back, he writes his account in a newspaper, earning him money. He names the volcano after Alvarez. He ends the book saying that he will return to the cave one day with a large team, and continue the legacy of Alvarez, Carter, and Gatti.

== Characters ==
- Shankar Ray Choudhuri — The main protagonist, a young man from a village in Bengal. He is a smart, brave person who has a penchant for adventures.
- Diego Alvarez — A Portuguese explorer. He is a friend and mentor to Shankar, and together they explore the deepest reaches of Richtersveld for the Mountain of the Moon.
- Jim Carter — A British explorer who was Alvarez's companion in his previous expedition. Alvarez revealed to Shankar that Carter was killed by the Bunyip while he and Diego were exploring the Mountains of the Moon.
- Attilio Gatti — An Italian explorer. He discovered the diamond mine caves in c. 1879 but dies in a cave (later discovered by Shankar) on his way back, at the hands of his traitorous followers.
- Prasad Das Bandyopadhyay
- Tirumal Appa
- Shankar's mother
- Shankar's father

== In other media ==
=== Films ===
- A film based on the novel, named Chander Pahar directed by Kamaleshwar Mukherjee was released on 20 December 2013 (27 December 2013 in all over India). The film, joyfully received by critics and the Bengali audience, was produced by Shree Venkatesh Films and has been shot on locations across Africa. It was reportedly being made with a budget of nearly ₹150 million (US$1.6 million), making it one of the most expensive in the Bengali film industry.

Director Kamaleshwar Mukherjee mentioned Chander Pahar as his "Dream Project". The film has reportedly incorporated CGI and visual effects at par with Hollywood and Bollywood standards. Dev plays the role of the main protagonist, Shankar. Most of the other cast members are from South Africa. According to the crew members, it took a considerable time to decide who would play the role of Diego Alvarez, and South African actor Gérard Rudolf was selected. The first theatrical trailer of the film was released by Shree Venkatesh Films, at the Kolkata Nicco Park on 14 November 2013.

Shooting locations include Kruger National Park, the mountains of Drakensberg, and the deserts of Kalahari.

- A sequel film Amazon Obhijaan also directed by Kamaleshwar Mukherjee and starring Dev, was released in 2017. The film is based on the characters of Chander Pahar created by Bibhutibhushan Bandyopadhyay.

=== Graphic novels ===
Moon Mountain
- Date: 15 Feb 2014
- Page count: 160 pages
- Publisher: Penguin India

Creative team
- Writers: Bibhutibhushan Bandyopadhyay
- Artist: Sayan Mukherjee
- Creator: Bibhutibhushan Bandyopadhyay

Original publication
- Language: English
- ISBN: 9780143332589

- Moon Mountain is a 2014 Graphic novel adapted from Bibhutibhushan Bandyopadhyay's classic Chander Pahar. The graphic novel is published by Penguin Books India, has its script written by Saurav Mohapatra with illustrations by Sayan Mukherjee
- Another graphic novel named Amazon Obhijaan released as a promotional activity of the film of same name, written by film director Kamaleshwar Mukherjee.

== Legacy ==
Inspired by Shankar's character in Chander Pahar Bengali adventurer Anindya Mukhopadhyay took an expedition to explore the "Chander Pahar" or "Mountain of the Moon" in Africa, which inspired Bibhutibhushan Bandyopadhyay to write the novel, and he finds the real "Mountain of the Moon" is Rwenzori Mountains. Anindya Mukhopadhyay travelled the mountain and have written a book called Abar Chander Pahar, where he explained about his journey to Rwenzori Mountains.

== Sequels by other writers ==
- Writer Partha De has written two of the novels featuring Shankar as the protagonist. Name of those novels are - Chander Upatyaka and Rajhangsir Sarobar. In both novel another character Prasad Das Bandyopadhyay from the original novel also featured along with Shankar Roy Chowdhury. Later in 2017, two of the novels were published in a collection book named Chander Upatyaka by Prativas Prakashan.
  - Chander Upatyaka - Prasad Das Bandyopadhyay is now at Brazil and doing rubber business. Where Shankar was called by him to take a part in that business. Soon Shankar finds that he has been called here for a different reason. He learns, the treasure of last Inca king Atahualpa was hidden somewhere in Amazon. He tries to explore the place.
  - Rajhangsir Sarobar - Prasad Das Bandyopadhyay is now at Russian jail. A mysterious lady invites Shankar to Russia to help Prasad Das. After arriving Russia Shankar gets involved into a conspiracy, which might lead to worldwide devastation.

== See also ==
- Shankar Ray Choudhuri
- Diego Alvarez
