= Mukhomukhi =

- Release poster
- Directed by: Kamaleshwar Mukherjee
- Written by: Kamaleshwar Mukherjee
- Based on: Abayab drama by Kamaleshwar Mukherjee
- Produced by: Firdausul Hasan
- Starring: Jisshu Sengupta; Rajatava Dutta; Gargi Roychowdhury; Darshana Banik; Payel Sarkar; Ushasie Chakraborty; Padmanabha Dasgupta
- Edited by: Arghyakamal Mitra
- Release date: 1 February 2019
- Country: India
- Language: Bengali

Mukhomukhi is an Indian Bengali language film directed by Kamaleshwar Mukherjee. The film is based on a drama Abayab written by the director himself. The film was released in India on 1 February 2019.

== Plot ==
Agnibha (Played by Rajatava) is a novelist and Isha's (Played by Gargee) biggest critic. When he adds a twist to her latest story about an estranged couple, (played by Jisshu and Paayel), things quickly drift towards an uncertain end.

== Cast ==
- Jisshu Sengupta
- Rajatava Dutta
- Gargi Roychowdhury
- Darshana Banik
- Payel Sarkar
- Ushasie Chakraborty
- Padmanabha Dasgupta
