= Gérard Rudolf =

South African film actor and poet

- Born: 20 April 1966 (age 60); Pretoria, South Africa
- Education: University of Pretoria
- Occupation: Actor
- Years active: 1992–present
- Height: 1.91 m (6 ft 3 in)

Gérard Rudolf is a South African actor. He has starred in many TV series and films since 1992, including the 2013 Bengali film Chander Pahar and the SABC 3 soap Isidingo. He stars as Boef Beukes in the 2023 M-Net series Devil's Peak, based on the novel of the same name by Deon Meyer.

== Early life and education ==
Gérard Rudolf was born in Pretoria, South Africa, but spent most of his younger years in Cape Town and then his teenage years in Johannesburg.

After completing high school he did two years of compulsory military service, and was sent to fight in the Angolan War. In 1987 he joined the drama school at the University of Pretoria, where he graduated in 1989.

== Career ==
Rudolf joined the CAPAB (Cape Performing Arts Board) drama company for a year, during which he performed on stage in Shakespeare plays, comedies, and dramas.

He left the company in 1991 to start his own theatre company called Makeshift Moon, specialising in original South African works. In the same year, he developed an interest in film and appeared in several roles over the following decade, beginning in 1992 with the series Arende II. He received some notoriety as an outspoken opponent to the Apartheid regime at the time, and he also campaigned against forced military conscription.

In 2013, Rudolf played Diego Alvarez in the award-winning Bengali film Chander Pahar, opposite Bengali star Dev (Bengali). Based on the 1937 adventure novel of the same name, which was filmed in South Africa. He described the role as "the most challenging and beautiful character I have ever played".

From 2017 until mid-2019, Rudolf played Hendrik Lategan in the SABC 3 soap Isidingo, before his character suddenly dies of a brain aneurysm.

In 2018, he starred in Kanarie, a "coming-of-age musical war drama" set in South Africa in the 1980s.

Rudolf played Boef Beukes in the 2023 crime drama series Devil's Peak.

== Other roles and activities ==
In 1998, he started his own acting school in Cape Town, but left after feeling burnt out in 2002.

Rudolf published a collection of poetic writings in 2009, titled Orphaned Latitudes.

== Personal life ==
Rudolf divorced his wife after quitting his acting school in 2002 and moved to the United Kingdom, returning in 2010 to Johannesburg.

== Publications ==
Year	Book	Publisher	Type
2009	Orphaned Latitudes	Red Squirrel Press	Poetry

== Filmography ==
Selected Filmography :

Year	Film	Role	Notes
1992	Arende II		TV series
1993	Arende III		TV series
1997–1998	The Adventures of Sinbad		TV series
1998	Paljas	Jan Mol	
2001	Styx	Sloan	
2001	Dust		
2002	Pavement		
2002	The Piano Player	Ryan Tyler	
2003	Adrenaline	Ben	
2003	The Young Black Stallion	Rhamon	
2008	Transito	Priester	
2012	Wolwedans in die Skemer		
2012	Wild at Heart		TV series
2013	Layla Fourie	Van Niekerk	
2013	Chander Pahar	Diego Alvarez	Bengali film
2013	Jimmy in Pienk	Gigi	
2015	Die Ontwaking	Capt. Fred Lange	
2016	The Siege of Jadotville	Black Jack	
2018	Canary (Kanarie)	Ds Koch	
2018	Griekwasted	Hannes Cloete	
2018	The Tokoloshe		
2023	Devil's Peak	Boef Beukes	TV series based on Deon Meyer's novel of the same name
2025	Recipes for Love and Murder	Ricus "The Satanic Mechanic"	TV Series 2
