= Attilio Gatti =

Italian explorer, filmmaker

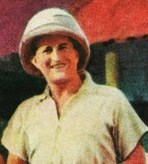
- A c. 1939 illustration of Gatti
- Born: 10 July 1896; Voghera, Lombardy, Italy
- Died: 1 July 1969 (aged 72); Derby Line, Vermont, United States
- Occupations: Explorer; author; documentary filmmaker
- Spouse: Ellen Gatti (died 1962)

Attilio Gatti (10 July 1896 - 1 July 1969) was an Italian-born explorer, author, and documentary filmmaker who travelled extensively in Africa in the first half of the 20th century.

== Expeditions ==
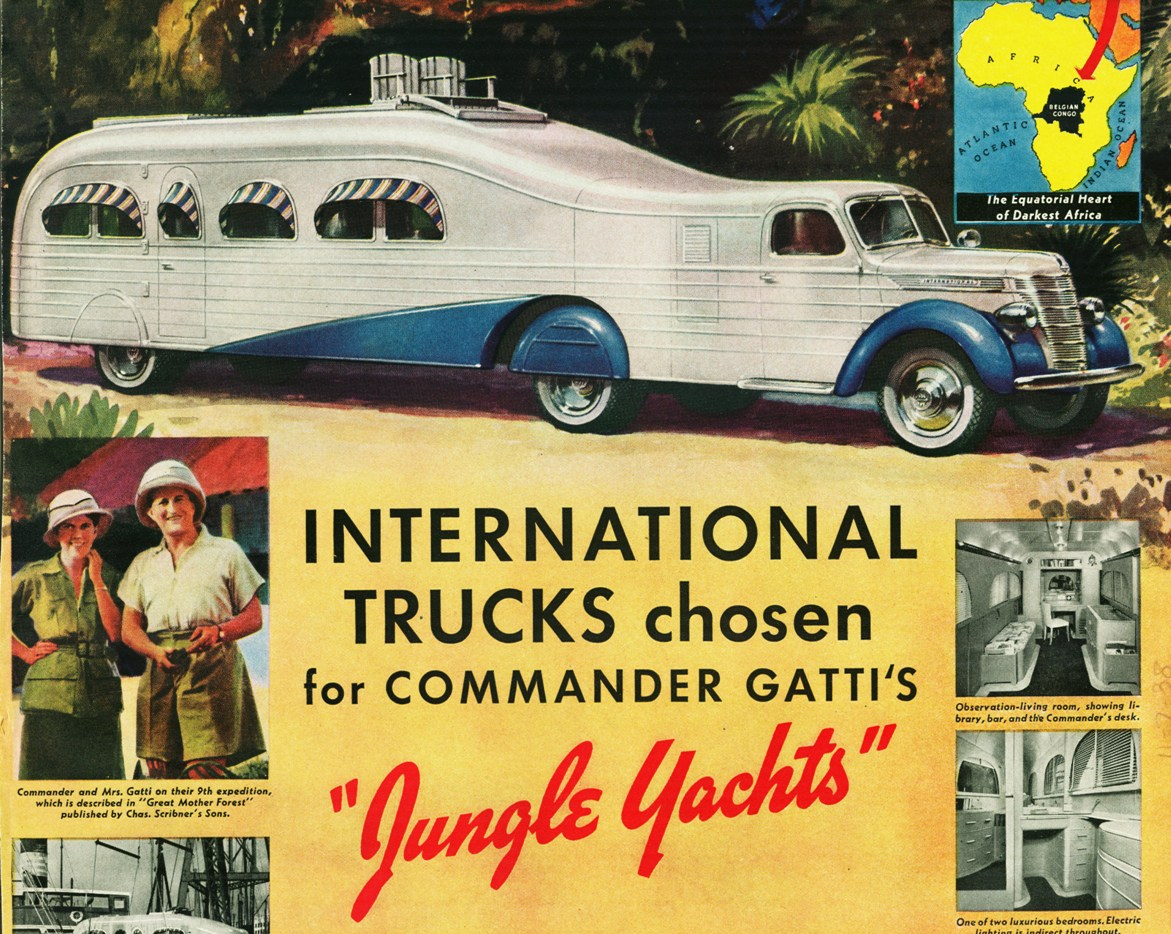
1939 advertisement for International Harvester featuring Gatti, his wife Ellen, and their expedition to the Belgian Congo

Gatti, a member of the Società Reale Italiana di Geografia ed Antropologia, was among the last great safari expedition men. He led thirteen expeditions to Africa starting in 1922. Broke after the financial disaster of his 7th African expedition, Gatti settled in the US in 1930. His second spouse, Ellen, accompanied him on his 8th expedition. They did the 10th (in Belgian Congo, 1938–1940) and 11th expeditions ("To the Mountains of the Moon" i.e. the Rwenzori Mountains at the border of Uganda, 1947–1948) with a caravan of motor vehicles including a 9-ton "Jungle Yacht", custom-built by International Harvester in Chicago.

Gatti became one of the first Europeans to see and capture the fabled okapi and bongo, a brown lyre-horned antelope with white stripes. He was an enthusiastic amateur radio operator using callsign OQ5ZZ. Known as "Bwana Makubwa", he was very familiar to the Pygmy tribe. He photographed them as well as the Watussi and Masai.

His books, articles, and some 53,000 photos have become invaluable scientific and anthropological resources.

== Books ==
- Gatti, Attilio. Tom-toms in the Night. London : Hutchinson & Co, 1932, 285 p., fig. (includes: The King of the Gorillas. 1932)
- Black Mist. 1933
- Gatti, Ellen; Gatti, Attilio. Hidden Africa. London : Hutchinson & Co. Ltd, 1933. 286 p., ill.
- Gatti, Attilio. Musungu : romanzo. Milano : Editrice Genio, 1933, 247 p., ill.
- Gatti, Attilio. Great Mother Forest. London : Hodder & Stoughton, 1936. 344 p.
- Gatti, Attilio. Saranga the Pigmy. Ill. by Kurt Wiese. New York : Charles Scribner's Sons, 1939, 226 p. (trad. in Italian: Saranga il cacciatore. 1941)
- Kamanda: An African Boy. 1941 (with ill. by Ellen Gatti)
- The Wrath of Moto. 1941
- Gatti, Attilio. Adventure in black and white. Ill. by Kurt Wiese. New York, C. Scribner's Sons, 1943. 172 p., ill.
- Gatti, Ellen; Gatti, Attilio. Here is Africa. Ill. with photographs by Attilio Gatti and others; maps by Raymond Lufkin. New York : Scribner's Sons, 1943, 166 p., carte, fig.
- Gatti, Attilio. Killers all !. New York : R.M. McBride & c°, 1943, 245 p., ill.
- Mediterranean Spotlights. 1944
- South of the Sahara: Perilous Encounters with Big Game and Strange Peoples in the African Wilds. 1945
- Here Is the Veld. 1948
- Kamanda on Safari. (1953?)
- Jungle Killers. 1958
- Gatti, Attilio. Africa is adventure. New York : Messner, 1959, 249 p.
- Gatti, Ellen; Gatti, Attilio.The New Africa. Ill. with phot. by the authors and others; maps by Rafael Palacios. New York : Charles Scribner's Sons, World background books, 1960, X, 213 p., ill.
- Sangoma. 1962
- Bapuka. 1963

Ellen Gatti: Exploring We Would Go. 1944 (autobiography)

== Films ==
- Siliva Zulu: Storia Negra in 5 Parti (Italy 1927/1928; silent film; with anthropologist professor Lidio Cipriani)
- Tramonto dei blasoni (Italy 1928; silent film)
- Perils of the Jungle (USA 1941)
- Bitter Spears (USA 1956; remake of "Siliva the Zulu")
