= Lidio Cipriani =

Italian explorer

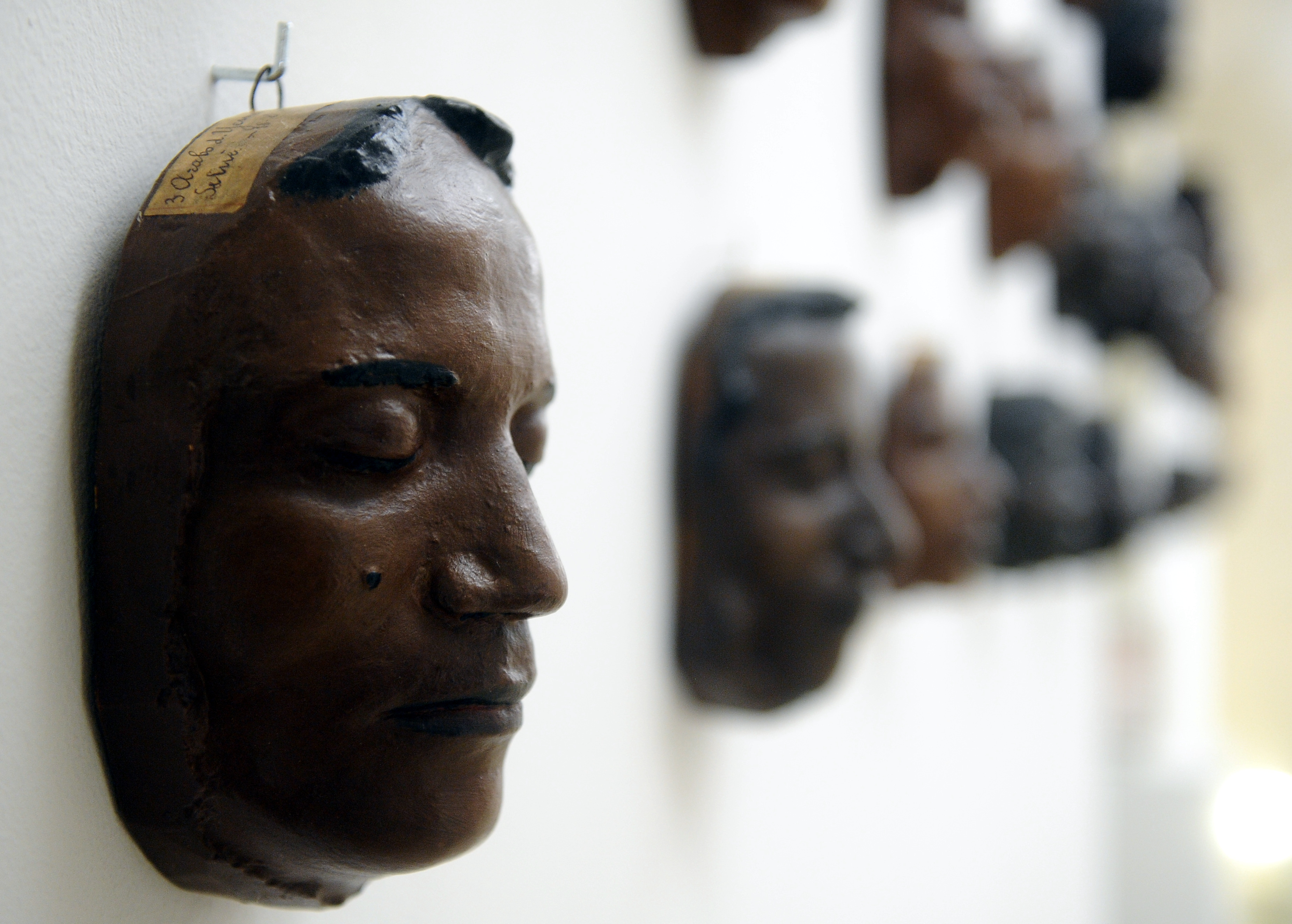
- Facial plaster casts made by Lidio Cipriani (1927–1930). The original white plaster casts were then painted according to the color of the skin of the subject, using a color scale.
- Born: 17 March 1892; Bagno a Ripoli, Kingdom of Italy
- Died: 8 October 1962 (aged 70); Florence, Italian Republic
- Occupations: Anthropologist, university teacher and explorer
- Board member of: Museo nazionale di antropologia ed etnologia di Firenze
- Awards: International Broca Prize (1924); Knight grand cross of the Colonial Order of the Star of Italy (1935)

Academic background
- Education: University of Florence

Academic work
- Discipline: Anthropologist, ethnologist
- Sub-discipline: Physical anthropologist
- School or tradition: Anthropometric school
- Institutions: University of Florence
- Notable works: The Andaman Islanders

Lidio Cipriani (17 March 1892 – 8 October 1962) was an anthropologist, university teacher and explorer from Florence.

== Education and academia ==
Cipriani first trained and worked as an elementary school teacher like his father. He then volunteered for the military and served in World War I. As of 1920 Cipriani studied natural sciences and graduated in 1923, became docent of anthropology at the University of Florence and Director of the Istituto e Museo Nazionale di Antropologia in the same university. In 1924 Cipriani was awarded the International Broca Prize of Paris for Anthropology. He distinguished himself by a long period of exploration and field work in several continents and among a large number of tribes and population of Africa, Southwest Asia and India.

== Research ==
As an exponent of the anthropometric school, Cipriani was particularly interested in systematic measurements (cranial, but also of hands, feet, and all other kinds of body parts), and he was also fond of making plaster facial moulds made from life, for which he procured models among the populations he encountered.

Cipriani's three journeys in Africa were documented by a large number of photographs and the chronicle was reported in his book In Africa dal Capo al Cairo (‘In Africa from the Cape to Cairo’) (1932): over 600 pages of anthropological, zoological, botanical and geological information.

His Indian work started in the South, in collaboration with the late Prof. Anantha K. Iyer and his work on the physical anthropology of the Toda (Arch. per l'Antrop. e la Etnol. LXVII, 1937 XV) and of the Coorg, Kuruba, Ierava etc. (Idem, LXV, 1935) throws new light on these populations. Later, as a Foreign Fellow of the Anthropological Survey of India he collaborated with the late Dr. B. S. Guha in his work on the Onge of Little Andaman Island.

In the summer of 1942, Cipriani arrived in Crete which was then under Axis occupation. With the aim of anthropologically studying the Cretans, he traveled from one end of the island to the other and took anthropological measurements on 2,375 men and women, most of whom he photographed. At the same time he captured activities and tasks, ceremonies, habits, houses, landscapes, archaeological sites and elements of the fauna and flora of Crete. In May 1943 he published in Florence his study "Creta e l'origine mediterranea della civiltà", in which he included a small fraction of the material he had collected in Crete. His archive was rediscovered in 2012 and latter published in its entirety in a bilingual (Greek/Italian) book.

Cipriani died in his native Florence at the age of seventy on the 8 October 1962. A committed fascist, Cipriani was one of the authors of the Manifesto of Race, published on 14 July 1938 in Il Giornale d'Italia. He began working at the Racial Office and contributing to Telesio Interlandi's journal La difesa della razza almost from its inception.

== Works ==
- Cipriani, Lidio (1932). In Africa dal Capo al Cairo. Florence: R. Bemporad & figlio.
- Cipriani, Lidio (1953). "Report on a Survey of the Little Andaman during 1951-53". Bulletin of the Department of Anthropology. 2 (1): 61–82.
- The Andaman Islanders. By Lidio Cipriani. Edited and translated by D. Taylor Cox, assisted by Linda Cole. New York: Frederick A. Praeger. 1966.
