= Diego Alvarez (character) =

Fictional character in a Bengali novel

- Chander Pahar character
- A portrait of Alvarez from Chander Pahar novel.
- First appearance: Chander Pahar (1937)
- Last appearance: Amazon Obhijaan (Mentioned) (2017)
- Created by: Bibhutibhushan Bandyopadhyay
- Portrayed by: Gérard Rudolf

In-universe information
- Alias: Alvarez
- Occupation: Explorer; Gold / Diamond Prospector
- Relatives: Shankar Ray Choudhuri (Friend, surrogate son); Jim Carter (Friend)
- Nationality: Portuguese
- Death: Bunyip attack

Diego Alvarez is a fictional character in the Bibhutibhushan Bandopadhyay novel Chander Pahar. He is a Portuguese explorer and Gold / Diamond Prospector. He acts as a friend and mentor to Shankar Ray Choudhuri, and together they try to explore the deepest reaches of Richtersveld for the Mountain of the Moon. His name isn't really Portuguese but Spanish, the correct form in Portuguese would have been Diogo Álvares.

== Background and history ==
One day in African jungle Shankar rescues and nurses Diego Alvarez. His arrival becomes a turning point in Shankar's life. While recuperating, Alvarez narrated his earlier exploits in Africa with his friend Jim Carter. Lured by a priceless, uncut yellow diamond gifted by the Chief of a Kaafi village, Alvarez and Carter had resolved to find the cave of these yellow diamonds, located on the Mountain of the Moon- Chander Pahar- in the Richtersveld, which was believed to be guarded by the mythical monster, the Bunyip. The explorers set off, much against the villagers' advice, braved the dense jungle and hostile environment but met with disaster- for Carter was gruesomely killed, supposedly by the Bunyip.

=== In Richtersveld ===
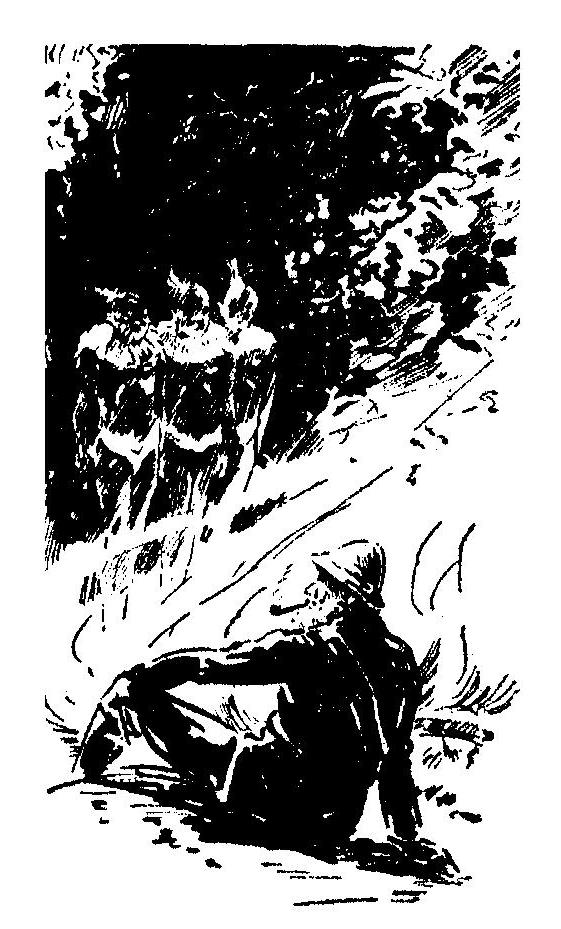
Picture of Alvarez smoking.

Shankar, highly inspired by Alvarez's exploits, resigns from his job and accompanies Alvarez as they decide to venture out once more and find the mines. They meet with innumerable hardships, and come across the raging volcano called Ol Doinyo Lengai. But the volcano was uncharted by the world outside, thus making Shankar and Alvarez its first discoverers. Eventually, they get lost in the forests where Alvarez suffers death at the hands of a mysterious monster, the same that had taken Carter's life, the Bunyip.

=== Legacy ===
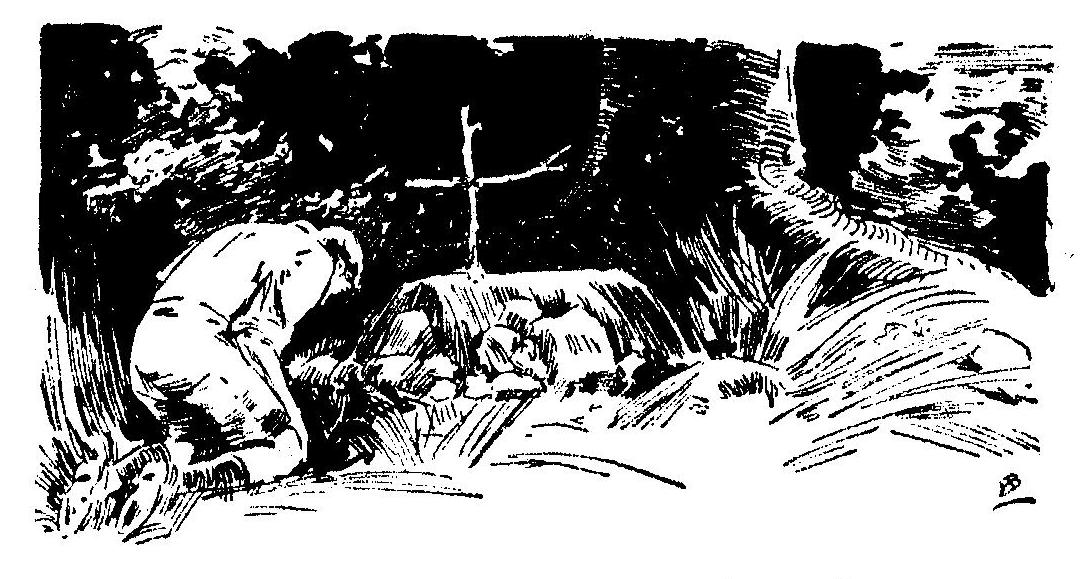
The grave of Alvarez.

After returning from the Mountain of the Moon Shankar wrote an article for a local newspaper where he refers to the Ol Doinyo Lengai volcano as Mount. Alvarez.

== In other media ==
=== Film ===
In the film- Chander Pahar or Mountain of the Moon Alvarez's character is portrayed by South African actor Gérard Rudolf.

=== Graphic novel ===
Diego Alvarez appeared in the 2014 graphic novel Moon Mountain as the friend of protagonist Shankar.
