= Arende =

- Cover for the dvd release of Arende.
- Genre: Adventure, Historical drama
- Written by: Paul C. Venter
- Starring: Ian Roberts, Gavin van den Berg, Brian O'Shaughnessy
- Country of origin: South Africa
- Original languages: Afrikaans; English
- No. of seasons: 3
- No. of episodes: 33

Production
- Executive producer: Dirk de Villiers
- Running time: 46 minutes

Original release
- Network: SABC
- Release: 27 April 1989 – 20 January 1994

Arende, also known as Cape Rebel, is a television mini-series and historical drama about the Second Boer War, as experienced by two fictional characters: Sloet Steenkamp (played by Ian Roberts), a rebellious Boer farmer, and James Kerwin (played by Gavin van den Berg), a captain with the British Army.

== Television miniseries ==
The first season comprising 10 episodes was first aired on 27 April 1989 on the SABC. The second season titled "Arende II: MoordenaarsKaroo" comprising 10 episodes was first aired on 13 February 1992 and the third and final season titled Arende III: Dorsland was first aired on 28 October 1993 and comprised 13 episodes. The show was run on SABC 1 in South Africa and syndicated abroad under the name Cape Rebel.

The miniseries ends with Sloet's band of Boer bittereinder exiles being ambushed by a group of Nama led by Hendrik Witbooi in Namibia during the Herero Wars.

== Movie ==
A film version of Arende also starring Ian Roberts as Sloet Steenkamp and Gavin van den Berg as Captain James Kerwin was released in 1994. The movie follows Sloet Steenkamp after the British invasion, and his is subsequent capture and imprisonment on Saint Helena Island.

Sloet is originally sentenced to execution for treason, due to his past as a British citizen originally from the Cape Colony that joined the war on the Boer side; his execution is commuted to life imprisonment. The movie follows his ultimately unsuccessful attempts at escaping the island. It ends with the death of two fellow inmates and the attempted kidnapping of the island's governor to demand better medical care, and a race with Captain Kerwin that ends in the death of another Boer prisoner – and friend of Sloet's – just as the end of the Boer War is announced.
