= Chaamp =

2017 Indian Bengali sports drama film by Raj Chakraborty

- Chaamp Movie Poster
- Directed by: Raj Chakraborty
- Screenplay by: Padmanabha Dasgupta; Raj Chakraborty
- Story by: Dev
- Produced by: Gurupada Adhikari; Dev; Raj Chakraborty
- Dialogues by: Padmanabha Dasgupta
- Inspired from: Shiba and Shibar Phire Asha by Moti Nandi
- Starring: Dev; Rukmini Maitra
- Cinematography: Soumik Haldar
- Edited by: MD. Kalam
- Music by: Songs: Jeet Gannguli; Anupam Roy; Background score: Indraadip Dasgupta
- Production companies: Dev Entertainment Ventures; Geetsangeet Productions; Raj Chakraborty Entertainment Productions
- Distributed by: SVF Entertainment
- Release dates: 23 June 2017 (West Bengal); 30 June 2017 (All India)
- Running time: 155:40 Minutes
- Country: India
- Language: Bengali
- Box office: approx. ₹8.9 crore

Chaamp is a 2017 Indian Bengali-language sports action drama film co-written and directed by Raj Chakraborty. Conceptualized and produced by Dev under the banner of Dev Entertainment Ventures, the film is loosely based on Moti Nandi's famous novels Shiba and Shibar Phire Asha. It stars Dev himself in the titular role, alongside an ensemble cast of Rukmini Maitr in her debut, Chiranjeet Chakraborty, Priyanka Sarkar, Laboni Sarkar, Kamaleshwar Mukherjee, Biplab Chatterjee and Supriyo Dutta. It revolves around the rise and fall of an aspiring boxer Shibaji, who makes a comeback to sports due to the circumstances.

The film was officially announced in September 2016 under the tentative title, Dev 29 as it is Dev's 29th film and the official title was announced in November 2016. Principal photography commenced in December 2016. It was predominantly shot in Kolkata, with a minor schedule in Delhi, and wrapped by mid-April. The film has music composed by Jeet Gannguli, Anupam Roy and Raftaar, while Indraadip Dasgupta provided its background score, with lyrics penned by Anindya Chatterjee, Srijato and Raja Chanda. The cinematography was handled by Soumik Haldar and editing was by MD. Kalam.

Chaamp was released on 23 June 2017 theatrically in West Bengal, while it was released worldwide on 30 June 2017.

== Plot ==
Shibaji, a famous Indian boxer, loses fame overnight when he meets a tragic accident that ruins his boxing career. After losing his title, he fights all odds to revive his career and become a champion again.

== Cast ==
- Dev as Shibaji "Shiba" Sanyal; A boxer
- Rukmini Maitr as Jaya Sanyal, Shiba's wife
- Chiranjeet Chakraborty as Coach Buro Bagchi
- Laboni Sarkar as Shiba's mother
- Ranajit Chatterjee as Shiba's late father
- Supriyo Dutta as Narukaka, a local grocer
- Priyanka Sarkar as Swati Bagchi
- Kamaleswar Mukherjee as Reporter Shantanu, the main Antagonist
- Padmanava Dasgupta as Shantanu's friend
- Biplab Chatterjee as Chacha
- Krishnokishore Mukhopadhyay as Mr. Sanyal, Jaya's dad
- Joydip Kundu as a businessman
- Akbar Hasan as Prashant Singh, A boxer and Shiba's rival
- Animesh Badhuri as a businessman
- Arjun Dasgupta as a doctor
- Raj Chakraborty as Swati's husband (Cameo Appearance)

== Production ==
In September 2016, The Times of India reported that Dev was going to launch Rukmini Maitr through a new production of his directed by Raj Chakraborty. It was reported that boxing is the main core of the film, with Dev playing the role of a boxer and Chiranjeet, playing the role of a retired boxer who wants to fulfill his dream through Dev's character.

The film is Dev's debut production with his company, Dev Entertainment Ventures.

== Release ==
The film released in West Bengal on 23 June 2017, and released in the rest of India on 30 June 2017. The film was distributed by SVF Entertainment in India.

=== Critical reception ===
The Times of India praised the film, giving Chaamp 3.5 stars out of 5 and calling the film a must watch. Their review praised the directing by Chakraborty, saying that the film shows his coming of age as a director. Despite calling him "deadpan as usual", the review notes that Dev has been played to his strengths and has the perfect body language. Maitra was praised for a debut performance, being called a natural in the review. The rest of the cast was commended for their performances, including Chakraborty, Sarkar, Kamaleshwar Mukherjee, and Supriyo Dutta. The review also commended the crew, specifically cinematographer Soumik Halder, art director Tanmoy Chakraborty and editor Md Kalam. However, the film's story was criticized for its similarities to Sultan, a 2016 Hindi film also about the comeback of an athlete. Dev told they wanted to do a film based on a Moti Nandi's story but didn't get the rights to it, hence Chaamp was made.

== Soundtrack ==
Chaamp

Soundtrack album by Jeet Gannguli, Raftaar & Anupam Roy
- Released: 10 June 2017
- Recorded: 2017
- Genre: Feature film soundtrack
- Length: 22:26
- Language: Bengali
- Label: Zee Music Bangla
- Producer: Dev

Singles from Chaamp
- 1. "Tu Hi Hai Chaamp" Released: 16 May 2017; 2. "Jaya Tomari" Released: 27 May 2017; 3. "Dekho Dekho Chaamp" Released: 2 Jun 2017; 4. "Tumio Chaamp" Released: 10 Jun 2017; 5. "Maula Re" Released: 14 Jun 2017; 6. "Shibaji Shibaji" Released: 29 Jun 2017

Jeet Gannguli chronology
Boss 2: Back To Rule (2017)	Chaamp (2017)	Dekh Kemon Lage (2017)

Raftaar chronology
One (2017)	Chaamp (2017)	Kaabil (2017)

Anupam Roy chronology
Arani Takhon (2017)	Chaamp (2017)	Uma (2018)

There are 2 additional songs by Raftaar and Anupam Roy which were not in the film but in the soundtrack. The soundtrack was initially released on Saavn on 14 May 2017, and was later released on other streaming services like Apple Music on 10 June 2017.

Track listing
No.	Title	Lyrics	Music	Artist(s)	Length
1.	"Tu Hi Hai Chaamp" (Title Track)	Anindya Chattopadhyay	Jeet Gannguli	Supratip Bhattacharya	4:09
2.	"Jaya Tomari"	Raja Chanda	Jeet Gannguli	Dev Negi	3:49
3.	"Dekho Dekho Chaamp"	Raftaar	Raftaar	Raftaar, Dev	2:36
4.	"Tumio Chaamp"	Anupam Roy	Anupam Roy	Anupam Roy	3:07
5.	"Maula Re"	Anindya Chattopadhyay	Jeet Gannguli	Arijit Singh	5:36
6.	"Shibaji Shibaji"	Srijato	Jeet Gannguli	Shayon Biswas	3:07

Jeet Gannguli, one of the composers of the soundtrack, expressed disappointment with the inclusion of Anupam Roy and Raftaar on the soundtrack. He explained that he initially composed four tracks for the soundtrack, and felt that since he had already done that, he should complete the soundtrack by composing the rest of the music. Gannguli further explained that he is not fond of the trend of hiring multiple composers for a single soundtrack album, a trend which has become popular in the Hindi film industry.

=== Album critical reception ===
"Jaya Tomari" has been described as a runaway hit, and was commended along with "Maula Re" and "Tumio Chaamp".

== Accolades ==
The film was nominated for multiple awards at the 2018 Filmfare Awards East.

Year	Nominated work	Category	Award	Result	Notes	Ref.
2018	Dev	Best Actor	Filmfare Award	Nominated	Filmfare Awards East	
2018	Arijit Singh	Best Singer (Male)	Filmfare Award	Nominated	Filmfare Awards East	
2018	Rukmini Maitr	Best Debut (Female)	Filmfare Award	Won	Filmfare Awards East; Also for the film Cockpit	

== See also ==
- List of highest-grossing Bengali films
- List of Bengali films of 2017
- List of boxing films
