= Shankar Ray Choudhuri =

Fictional character of Bengali novel

Puja miss
- Chander Pahar character
- A portrait of Shankar from Chander Pahar novel.
- First appearance: Chander Pahar (1937)
- Last appearance: Amazon Obhijaan (2017)
- Created by: Bibhutibhushan Bandyopadhyay
- Portrayed by: Dev

In-universe information
- Full name: Shankar Ray Choudhuri
- Nickname: Shankar
- Occupation: Explorer
- Family: Unnamed Mother; Unnamed Father
- Relatives: Diego Alvarez (Friend)
- Religion: Hinduism
- Home: Bengal Presidency, British India
- Nationality: British Indian

Shankar Ray Choudhuri is a fictional character and the hero of the novel of Bibhutibhushan Bandyopadhyay, Chander Pahar, a young Bengali man from a village in undivided Bengal, India. He is a smart, brave person who has a penchant for adventures. A franchise has been adapted from the novel which features Shankar.

== Background ==
Shankar is an ordinary young Bengali boy, from a nondescript village of Bengal. He is a 20-year-old youth, recently graduated from college and due to financial difficulties in the family, was about to take up a job in a jute mill of Shyamnagar, a prospect he absolutely loathes.

== In Africa ==
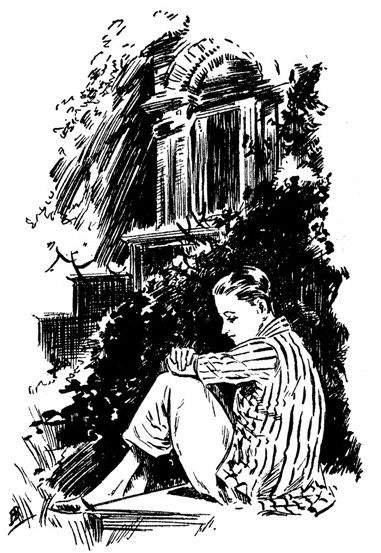
Shankar thinking about an adventurous life. (before going to Africa)

Since childhood, geography has been his pet subject; he has wanted to follow the footsteps of renowned explorers like Livingstone, Mungo Park, and Marco Polo, all of whom he has read about. He yearns for adventure, wild lands, forests and animals and the continent of Africa. By a stroke of luck, he secures a job as a clerk in Uganda Railway through an acquaintance already holding a post there and joyously rushes to Africa without a second thought.

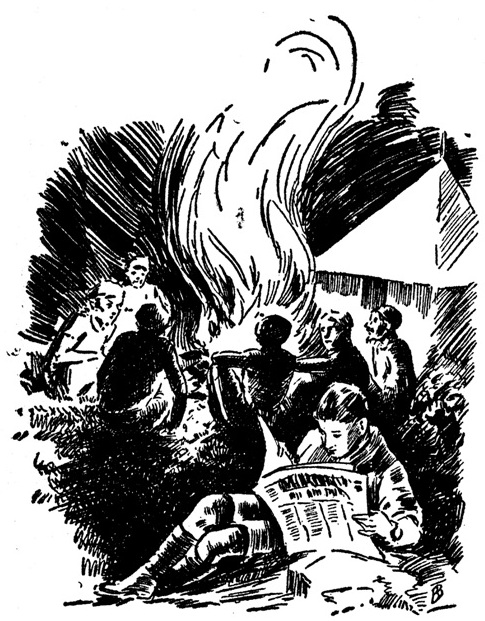
Shankar reading 'Kenia Morning News' in front of the campfire.

There, he spends a few months as a part of a company laying rail tracks but soon encounters the first of many dangers of pre-World War I Africa: man-eating lions who claim the lives of a few of his new-found friends in Africa. Later he takes up a job as station master in a desolate station amidst the Veldts. Here his presence of mind enables him to have a narrow escape from another hazard in Africa: the deadly black mamba. While at this post, Shankar one day encounters, rescues and nurses Diego Alvarez, a middle-aged Portuguese explorer and gold/diamond prospector. Alvarez's arrival becomes a turning point in Shankar's life. While recuperating, Alvarez narrated his earlier exploits in Africa with his friend Jim Carter. Lured by a priceless, uncut yellow diamond gifted by the Chief of a Kaafi village, Alvarez and Carter had resolved to find the cave of these yellow diamonds, located on the Mountain of the Moon- Chander Pahar- in the Richtersveld, which was believed to be guarded by the mythical monster, the Bunyip. The explorers set off, much against the villagers' advice, braved the dense jungle and hostile environment but met with disaster- for Carter was gruesomely killed, supposedly by the Bunyip.

Shankar, highly inspired by Alvarez's exploits, resigns from his job and accompanies Alvarez as they decide to venture out once more and find the mines. They meet with innumerable hardships, a raging volcano being the greatest challenge. But the volcano was unknown to the world outside, thus making Shankar and Alvarez its first discoverers. Eventually, they get lost in the forests where Alvarez suffers death at the hands of a mysterious monster, the same that had taken Carter's life, the Bunyip.

A grieved and demoralised Shankar sets out to attempt to reach civilization. He finds the Bunyip's cave and the diamond mines by accident. He enters the cave but eventually gets lost. With great difficulty, he gets out, marking his way with "pebbles" and taking some back with him as memento, not knowing each is a piece of uncut diamond. He finds the remains of the Italian explorer, Attilio Gatti, and learns that the cave he found earlier really was the diamond mine. Gatti, as Shankar learns from a note by him, had uncut diamonds in his boots. The note said that whoever reads the note can take the diamonds as long as he buries his skeleton, with Christian rites. Shankar does so, and keeps the old diamonds. He becomes lost in the deserts of Kalahari and nearly dies of thirst. He is rescued by a survey team, and taken to a hospital in Salisbury, Rhodesia, from where he sets sail for home. Before going back he wrote his account in a newspaper which earned him quite some money. In that he named the volcano after Alvarez. He ends the book saying that he will return to that cave one day with a large team, and continue the legacy of Alvarez, Carter and Gatti.

== In other media ==
=== Film ===
In the 2013 film Chander Pahar and 2017 film Amazon Obhijaan Shankar's character is portrayed by Bengali actor Dev.

=== Graphic novel ===
Shankar Roy Chowdhury appeared in the 2014 graphic novel Moon Mountain as the protagonist.

== See also ==
- Chander Pahar
