= Amazon Obhijaan =

2017 film by Kamaleshwar Mukherjee

- Theatrical release poster
- Directed by: Kamaleshwar Mukherjee
- Written by: Kamaleshwar Mukherjee
- Based on: Characters of Chander Pahar, created by Bibhutibhushan Bandyopadhyay
- Produced by: Mahendra Soni; Shrikant Mohta
- Starring: Dev; Laboni Sarkar; David James; Svetlana Gulokava
- Cinematography: Soumik Haldar
- Edited by: Rabiranjan Maitra
- Music by: Indraadip Dasgupta
- Production company: Shree Venkatesh Films
- Distributed by: Shree Venkatesh Films
- Release date: 22 December 2017
- Running time: 140 minutes
- Country: India
- Language: Bengali
- Budget: est.₹20 crore
- Box office: approx.₹48.63–50 crore (Note: Amazon Obhijaan's reported box office varies between ₹48.53 crore (The Statesman) – ₹50 crore (Hindustan Times and Indian Express))

Amazon Obhijaan (lit. The Amazon Expedition) is a 2017 Indian Bengali-language action-adventure film written and directed by Kamaleshwar Mukherjee and produced by Shrikant Mohta and Mahendra Soni under the banner of Shree Venkatesh Films. Starring Dev in the lead role of Shankar, it is the sequel to 2013 film Chander Pahar and the second installment of Chander Pahar film series. The film revolves around Shankar, an adventurer who, along with a lady and her father, travels to Amazon in search of the City of Gold, El Dorado.

Amazon Obhijaan marked the 100th film of the production house. Released in the theatres on 22 December 2017, it is the highest-grossing Indian Bengali film of all time and the third highest grossing Bengali film overall. On 5 January 2018, the film was dubbed and released in five languages: Hindi, Tamil, Telugu, Odia and Assamese. It also became the first Bengali film to release theatrically in United Kingdom on 12 January 2018, in 30 years.

== Plot ==
The film begins in the Amazon in 1913, where the ship The Witch of Endor is wrecked, killing a group of Garimpeiros (gold hunters).Within the wreckage, A sealed bottle containing an ancient coded map of El Dorado, locked in the ship's vault, sinks into the riverbed of the Rio Solimões. Marco Florian, an Italian adventurer who possessed the map, is the sole survivor and washes ashore at Miratinga. Attacked by a panther, he faints but not before witnessing his saviours, the Virgins of the Sun, the mythical women warriors of the Amazon.

Two years later, in 1915, Marco's daughter Anna, a young anthropologist, approaches Shankar, requesting him to join her expedition. Shankar, who had already tasted the elation of discovery in the Richterveld in Africa during the events of Chander Pahar, readily accepts. The journey takes them to the heart of the Amazon rainforest, in search of the enigmatic Yanomami people and the hidden city of gold, El Dorado.

Laden with natural difficulties, wild animals, savage tribes and a vicious gold digger, the explorers travel thousands of miles. Shankar, undaunted, confronted each threat: a menacing black caiman, a gigantic anaconda. Marco's drinking threatened to tear the group apart, but Shankar intervened, keeping the expedition intact. It ended in a revelation about El Dorado, one that upended the explorers' understanding of wealth and discovery.

== Cast ==
- Dev as Shankar Ray Choudhuri
- Laboni Sarkar as Shankar's mother
- Tamal Ray Chowdhury as Shankar's father
- David James as Marco Florian
- Svetlana Gulakova as Anna Florian
- Eduardo Munniz as Ankoma
- Augusto Cesar as Doctor

== Production ==
=== Development and casting ===
In early 2014, director Kamaleshwar Mukherjee had already penned the script for a sequel to Chander Pahar (2013), taking the story forward from where it left off. Actor Dev was quoted at the time saying that the next location, following the African safari, would be the dense forests of the Amazon rainforest. The film was produced by Shrikant Mohta and Mahendra Soni under the banner of Shree Venkatesh Films (SVF), and marked the production house's 100th film.

With a budget of approximately ₹20 crore, Amazon Obhijaan was the most expensive Bengali film ever made at the time of its release. This was a significant increase from its predecessor, Chander Pahar, which had a budget of ₹15 crore.

=== Filming ===
The production faced significant logistical challenges, primarily due to its ambitious choice of location. Initially, the makers planned to shoot the film in Siberia to capture a snowy landscape. However, the director decided to shift the film to a rainforest. Although Malaysia was considered for the shoot, it was ultimately rejected as it did not look "adventurous" enough. The Amazon rainforest was finalised owing to its authentic and dangerous landscapes.

The shooting commenced in May 2016. The initial parts of the film, which depicted Shankar's home in India, were shot in Bolpur. The majority of the film was shot across different locations in Brazil, including São Paulo, Manaus, and the Amazon forests. The underwater sequences were primarily shot in the rivers Rio Negro and Rio Solimões.

The shoot was physically demanding for the cast and crew. Dev injured his right foot when a sharp branch pierced through his boot. Despite the injury and pain, he resumed filming the next day, shooting scenes that required him to be seated. He also recounted a near-death experience when a tree branch they were shooting under snapped and fell, moments after they had moved away from it.

=== Visual effects ===
A major component of the film's production was its extensive use of visual effects (VFX) and computer-generated imagery (CGI) to bring the Amazon's wildlife and dangerous environments to life. The film underwent multiple stages of special effects work, with the CGI still being completed months before its release, leading the makers to reschedule the film to a Durga Puja 2017 slot to allow more time for post-production. Director Kamaleshwar Mukherjee described the post-production as "an arduous process" owing to the extensive use of special effects and animation in the film.

== Marketing ==
Amazon Obhijaan
- Date: 11 November 2017
- Page count: 160 pages

Creative team
- Writers: Kamaleshwar Mukherjee
- Creator: Chander Pahar by Bibhutibhushan Bandyopadhyay

Original publication
- Language: Bengali and English

The first poster and teaser released on 21 September 2017. A 320 feet long and 190 feet wide poster was launched on 4 November 2017, at the Mohun Bagan Ground and made a Guinness World Record of the biggest film poster in the history of India, breaking the record previously held by Baahubali. The trailer of the film was released on 1 December 2017 in Bengali, Assamese, Odia, Hindi, Tamil and Telugu languages.

=== Graphic novel ===
As a part of the promotional material, the makers released a graphic novel titled the same as the film, Amazon Obhijaan, on 11 November 2017. Written by the film's director Kamaleswar Mukherjee, it is available in English and Bengali.

== Soundtrack ==
Amazon Obhijaan

Soundtrack album by Indraadip Dasgupta
- Released: 2017
- Recorded: 2017
- Genre: Feature film soundtrack
- Length: 5:22
- Label: SVF
- Producer: SVF Entertainment Pvt. Ltd

Indraadip Dasgupta chronology
Yeti Obhijaan (2017)	Amazon Obhijaan (2017)	Kabir (2018)

Indraadip Dasgupta was signed to compose the music of the film. (The songs as well as the background score). The lyrics were penned by Prasen.

The film included only one song in the album. "Chol Naa Jai", sung by Arijit Singh and back vocals by Ishan Mitra, Sayan Ghosh, Amit Chatterjee was released on 16 December 2017.

Track listing
No.	Title	Lyrics	Singer(s)	Length
1.	"Chol Naa Jai"	Prasen	Arijit Singh	5:22
Total length:				5:22

== Release ==
=== Theatrical ===
The film was released theatrically on 22 December 2017 in the original Bengali language. On 5 January 2018, the dubbed versions were released in Hindi, Telugu, Tamil, Odia and Assamese languages. The film became the first Bengali film in 30 years to have a theatrical release in the United Kingdom, opening on 12 January 2018 in nine theatres across England through the Cineworld and Odeon Cinemas, with over 100 screenings in the first week. An estimated 150 theatres across 30 cities screened the film in India, including tier-II and tier-III cities such as Bokaro, Dhanbad, Faridabad, Dehradun, Surat, Jamnagar and Visakhapatnam.

=== Box office ===
Amazon Obhijaan earned ₹5.5 crore in its first week, setting a record for the highest first-week collection for a Bengali film in five years. The film went on to become the highest-grossing Bengali film ever, surpassing Dev's earlier Chander Pahar, with a worldwide gross of over ₹48 crore. By early January 2018, the film had collected approximately ₹12.26 crore in its Bengali box office run prior to its nationwide multi-language release.

=== Home media ===
The film had its television premiere in Bengali on 27 May 2018 on Star Jalsha. The Hindi version was premiered on Star Plus on 16 September 2018.

== Reception ==
Ronita Goswami of Zee 24 Ghanta rated the film 4 out of 5 stars and wrote "Amazon Obhijaan is a remarkable feat in Indian cinema in the genre of jungle adventure." She praised the direction, narration, sets, cinematography, background music and acting of the lead cast, specially Dev.

Bhaswati Ghosh of Ei Samay rated the film 3.5 out of 5 stars and wrote "Amazon Obhijaan is the big scale Bengali commercial film and Bengal's answer to South Indian biggies like Baahubali." She praised the cinematography but criticised the narration, screenplay, VFX, background score and the dialogue delivery. She additionally praised the director and production house for their attempt to take Bengali cinema "one step further."

Shamayita Chakraborty of The Times of India rated the film 3 out of 5 stars, writing, "One must watch the film. Not only because of its grandeur but also to savour Kamaleswar’s imagination. The mythic city of El Dorado is pretty much the same as we had imagined in childhood. And finally, the film ends where it all began — with a reference to National Geographic, the book that opened up the idea of Shankar’s first adventure, Chander Pahar, many years ago."

Bhaskar Chattopadhyay of the Firstpost rated the film 1 out of 5 stars and wrote "While lavishly planned and mounted, the film is ruthlessly slaughtered by its absolutely shoddy writing and equally cringe-worthy execution." He crticised the film for the unnecessary excesses in every department - the editing, dialogues, cinematography, art direction, background score, sound design, costumes and the makeup.

Sayantan Mondal of The Quint reviewed the film and wrote "‘Amazon Obhijaan’ is insipid, boring, lethargic and absolutely avoidable just like linking your Aadhar card." He mentioned how the cringe dialogues made the character of Shankar look more like an insurance agent and less of an explorer as if he was trying to sell an insurance policy to Anna.

== See also ==
- List of highest-grossing Indian Bengali films
