= Andrew Stock =

British artist (born 1960)

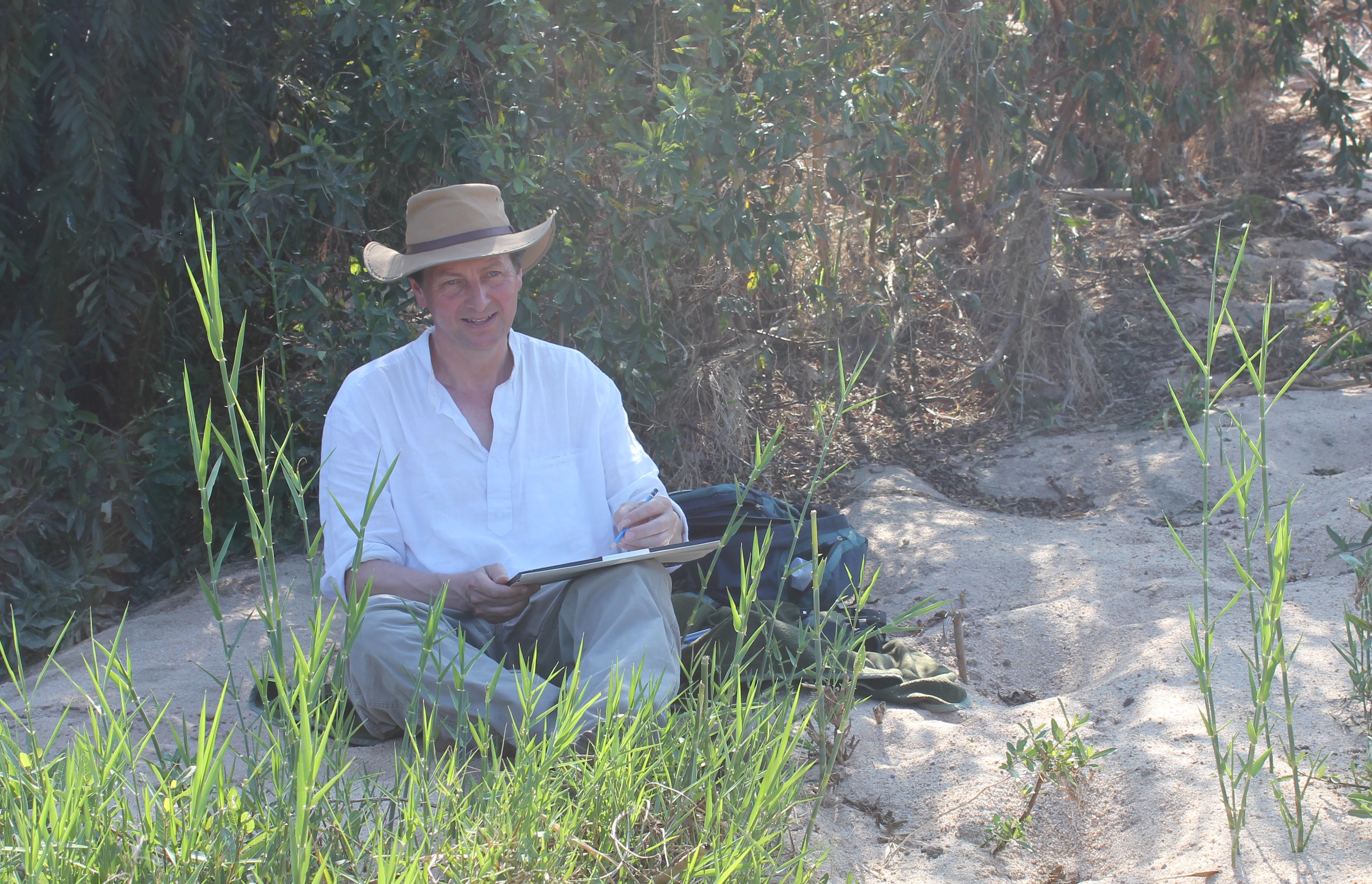
- Stock in the Atlas Mountains
- Born: Andrew Stock; 1960 (age 65–66); Germany

Andrew Stock (born 1960) is a British artist who, having spent many years in Dorset now lives in Devon. He has been painting wildlife and landscapes since 1978. He is the brother of Jon Stock, a British journalist and author. He has been a member of the Society of Wildlife Artists since 1983, was Honorary Secretary from 1995 to 2004 and President from 2004 to 2009. He is now an Honorary Vice-president of the society and continues to exhibit with them at the annual exhibition at the Mall Galleries. Stock served as a Governor at the Federation of British Artists from 1997 to 2003. In 2005 Stock was elected a Fellow of the Royal Society of Painter-Printmakers.

Stock held the first of four solo shows at the Malcolm Innes Gallery in London in 1981, followed by shows at the Mall Galleries in London and also abroad. While at school he was encouraged and inspired by Sir Peter Scott the conservationist and painter. He draws his inspiration from the local countryside as well as visits to Cornwall, the Outer Hebrides, Sutherland, France and Kaladungi, Corbett National Park, Kumaun Himalaya in India. and Ulusaba Private Game Reserve in South Africa.

Stock paints in oils and watercolours and in 1990 he added etching to his folio.

In 2008 he was invited by the Royal Navy to accompany HMS Endurance and artistically record the wildlife and landscape of Antarctica. The resulting work was successfully exhibited in a solo show at the Frost & Reed Gallery in St James's, London, in June 2009. This was followed by a further exhibition at Frost & Reed, based on the wildlife and landscapes of the Outer Hebrides in November 2010. Frost & Reed continued to represent Stock until the St James's gallery closed in the autumn of 2011. Stock subsequently exhibited at the Mall Galleries with 'The call of the running tide' exhibition in December 2013 and 'Ulusaba' in December 2014. Further exhibitions include 'Coastlines' in November 2016, featuring the wildlife and land/seascapes of north Cornwall and the Northwest Highlands, and 'Mules, mountains and minarets' in November 2017 (birdlife and landscapes in and around the Berber villages of the Atlas Mountains), both held at the Royal Opera Arcade Gallery, Pall Mall, London.
