= Chander Pahar (film) =

2013 Indian Bengali film by Kamaleshwar Mukherjee

- Theatrical poster
- Directed by: Kamaleshwar Mukherjee
- Written by: Bibhutibushan Bandyopadhyay
- Based on: Chander Pahar by Bibhutibhushan Bandyopadhyay
- Produced by: Mahendra Soni; Shrikant Mohta
- Starring: Dev; Gérard Rudolf; Martin Cito Otto
- Cinematography: Soumik Haldar
- Edited by: Raviranjan Maitra
- Music by: Indraadip Das Gupta & Debojyoti Mishra
- Production company: Shree Venkatesh Films
- Distributed by: Shree Venkatesh Films
- Release dates: 20 December 2013 (West Bengal); 27 December 2013 (India); 9 January 2014 (Worldwide)
- Running time: 148:41 minutes / (150:24 minutes)
- Country: India
- Languages: Bengali; English; Afrikaans
- Budget: ₹15 crore
- Box office: ₹22.50 crore (Note: Original Release: ₹20 crore (The Statesman) – ₹21 crore (Indian Express); Final Collection after Re-release in 2024: ₹22.50 crore (Hindustan Times))

Chander Pahar (released as Mountains of the Moon in English) is a 2013 Indian Bengali-language action-adventure film based on Chander Pahar by Bengali novelist Bibhutibhushan Bandyopadhyay, directed by Kamaleshwar Mukherjee and produced by Mahendra Soni and Shrikant Mohta under the banner of their production house Shree Venkatesh Films. It features Bengali actor Dev in the lead role as Shankar. This is the first collaboration between Dev and Mukherjee, the latter having made only two films before: Uro Chithi and Meghe Dhaka Tara. It was dream project of Late Filmmaker Tarun Majumdar.

Principal photography commenced on 20 April 2013. The film released on 20 December 2013. The trailer was released on Children's Day of 2013 at Nicco Park at 5 pm. This is the first Indian film to be extensively shot in South Africa. Chander Pahar is one of the most successful films in Bengali cinema. Critics consider it Dev's most memorable and recognizable work. It is the first film of the Chander Pahar franchise and was followed by Amazon Obhijaan in 2017. The film went down as the fourth highest grossing Bengali film of all time, surpassed by the sequel, Amazon Obhijaan.

== Plot ==
Chander Pahar is the story of a young Bengali man's adventures in Africa from 1909 to 1910. Shankar Ray Choudhuri is a 20-year-old man, recently completed his First Arts graduation and about to take up a job in a jute mill, a prospect he absolutely loathes.

Chander loves adventure, wildlands, forests and animals. He wants to follow the footsteps of famous explorers like Livingstone, Mungo Park, Marco Polo, all of whom he has read about and idolizes.

By a stroke of luck, he secures a job as a station master in a desolate station in Uganda Railway through a fellow villager working there and goes to Africa without a second thought. One evening Shankar is chased by a man-eating lion and luckily he reaches his cabin and locks the door. The next day he asks the head stationmaster to provide him with a Springfield bolt-action rifle and carbolic acid as a day before he encounters another hazard in Africa: the poisonous black mamba. He miffs the black mamba with his torchlight. The next day he gets these things from another fellow Indian, Tirumal Appa, who is serving the British Army.

They quickly strike a rapport and Tirumal visits him often. One day Tirumal becomes a victim of the same man-eating lion. This rages Shankar and he decides to end this peril. He poses as bait by pouring blood on himself and scatters meat chunks. He tempts the lion out of his cave and eventually shoots him down.

He rescues and looks after the middle-age Portuguese explorer and gold prospector, Diego Alvarez. The encounter with Alavarez influences him deeply. Alavarez tells him of his exploits and adventures, how he and his companion Jim Carter had braved deep jungles and mountains of Richtersveld to find the largest diamond mine. However, they were thwarted by the legendary Bunyip, a mythical monster who guards the mines and killed Carter.

Shankar gives up his job and accompanies Alvarez as he decides to venture out once more and find the mines again. They meet with innumerable hardships. The first is a raging volcano which forces them to halt their expedition. One night they were attacked by the monster Bunyip. Eventually, they get lost in the forests where Alvarez is killed by the monster, in an effort to save Shankar's life. Desolated Shankar mourns the death of Alvarez deeply. He buries him with all rites and sets sail towards the mountain of the moon.

Shankar sets out to reach civilization. He finds the diamond mines by accident. He enters the cave and gets lost. With great difficulty, he gets out, marking his way with "pebbles" and taking some back with him as a memento, not knowing each is an uncut diamond. He finds the remains of the Italian explorer, Attilio Gatti, and learns that the cave he found earlier was the diamond mine. Gatti, as Shankar learns from a note by him, had uncut diamonds in his boots. The note said that whoever reads the note can take the diamonds as long as he buries his skeleton, with Christian rites. Shankar does so and keeps the old diamonds.

While crossing the jungle, he comes in contact with the Bunyip's cave. Filled with revenge, he devises a plan to get rid of Bunyip. Shankar collects sticks from the jungle and sharpens their tips into spears. He fences the entrance with sharpened wood and waits for the Bunyip. The Bunyip turns up and, seeing its prey, jumps at it from a height. Shankar moves out and the Bunyip gets pierced on the wood and dies.

Shankar tries to move out by following the compass. He becomes lost in the deserts of Kalahari and nearly dies of thirst. Fortunately, he is rescued by a survey team and taken to a hospital in Salisbury, Rhodesia. When he recovers he sells four of his diamonds and for much money. One diamond he sends to his parents with a note to sell it and help the villagers with its money. Next, he sells his sole diamond and buys a steamer boat to continue his exploration.

He ends by saying that he will return to that cave one day with a large team and continue the legacy of Alvarez, Carter and Gatti.

== Cast ==
- Dev as Shankar Ray Choudhuri, the protagonist
- Gérard Rudolf as Diego Alvarez
- Martin Cito Otto as Jim Carter
- Nabeel Khan as Tirumal Appa
- Paul Ditchfield as Jacobus Marius
- Andrew Stock as Attilio Gatti
- Laboni Sarkar as Shankar's mother
- Tamal Roy Chowdhury as Shankar's father
- David James as Albuquerque
- Peter Moruakgomo as Zulu Chief
- Matthew Monika as Zulu King
- Rafiq Jibhay as Patel
- Keith Gendagoo as Prasad Das
- Luthuli Dlamini as Dan Mabiru
- Ramambila Muladelo as Masai Chief
- Debika Mitra as Shankar's relative (special appearance)

== Production ==
=== Development ===
"The film is about a young Bengali man and his adventures in South Africa. The story is set in 1909-1910. This time around, Kamal Da shot the early years of Shankar's life and for that, I had to gain few kilos to look like a typical bhodro-Bangali chhele. From my getup (dhuti-panjabi and jhola) to body language to the hairstyle – everything had to reflect the era Shankar hailed from. Trust me, it wasn't easy at all. Shankar loves adventure, forests and animals. The director wanted to see that passion in my eyes."

— Dev, sharing his experience on playing the role of Shankar, the protagonist of Chander Pahar

Director Kamaleshwar Mukherjee mentioned Chander Pahar as his "dream project". But he even compared the project to a "double-edged sword" as he realized the challenges while looking for locations in South Africa for a month. When Shree Venkatesh Films agreed to produce the film, they wanted a big star in the lead. As a result, it was decided that actor Dev would play the role of Shankar.

For this special project, Kamaleshwar has a Maasai proverb in mind: "If you are not living on the edge, you are taking up too much space." He added that he was lucky enough as Bibhutibhushan Bandyopadhyay, author of Chander Pahar, had such a fertile imagination that, without having visited Africa, he had a clear idea about the landscape. Even Dev said that the shooting of Chander Pahar was going to be the most exciting few days of his life.

=== Casting ===
A source close to the Chander Pahar unit revealed that the production house wanted a big star to play Shankar, the adventurer protagonist. At the beginning, Dev and Parambrata's names had come up. However, Kamaleshwar Mukherjee later said that Dev was in his and the producer's (Shree Venkatesh Films) minds from the beginning. They needed an athletic body for the role of Shankar because in the book it is mentioned that Shankar was into boxing and he knew horse riding and swimming. Dev was learning horse riding and he is good at action scenes. Therefore, finally, he was chosen to be cast as Shankar. Dev also agreed to do that as he was brought the offer. But he was asked to lose weight because, in the latter part of the film, Shankar fights with lions, walks through jungles and mountains, and almost starves. Regarding the character, Dev said, "Shankar, the protagonist, was an athlete and a boxer. He never flinches from any challenge or danger. Be it fighting the African lion or duelling on the cliff, and that too without a body double."

Most of the cast members of Chander Pahar are from South Africa. It took a lot of time to decide who was going to play the role of Diego Alvarez, the Portuguese explorer, who has a supporting role. It was later disclosed that, among others, South African actor Gérard Rudolf has been assigned the role of Alvarez. He even has a dialogue in Bengali, where he tells Shankar, "Ishwar Tomar Mongol Korun" (meaning, God Bless You).

Kamaleshwar Mukherjee said that he was sending a translated version of the script to the actors and added that, they were so professional that they had already read up about Chander Pahar on the Internet.

=== Budget ===
"Many directors wanted to make this film earlier. But they simply could not make it due to a lack of budget. This is the reason why I want to thank Shrikantda (Producer Shrikant Mohta) for financing this film. The film is made on a whopping fifteen crore budget. The cost is a big factor in the making of this film. There is a lion in the film which was acquired for six lakh rupees per day. Hence without a good budget, making Chander Pahar was impossible."

— Dev, in an interview speaking about the budgeting of Chander Pahar.

The budget of Chander Pahar was the highest in Bengali Cinema till its release in 2013. The film is produced by Shree Venkatesh Films and is shot at locations in Africa. It was reportedly being made with a budget of nearly ₹150 million (equivalent to ₹280 million or US$2.9 million in 2026) — making it one of the most expensive in the Bengali film industry. The film would reportedly incorporate computer-generated imagery and visual effects at par with Hollywood and Bollywood standards.

For Shree Venkatesh Films, Chander Pahar marked the latest in a series of adventure films. According to The Times of India, it will be high-budget and have computer graphics that no one has seen before in a Bengali film. It was also reported that the production costs suddenly went up by ₹10 million (US$100,000) more than that was estimated, during the second schedule of filming.

=== Filming ===
Chander Pahar was filmed for 45 days in South Africa. Before the filming, Kamaleshwar Mukherjee threw a party on 31 March 2013 at Kolkata, much before 20 April, the day when shooting was scheduled to start. Upon questioning, he said, "Before the shooting of the film which contains a large number of risks, team Chander Pahar wanted a party with the presence of all the crew and artists. Who knows if anyone doesn't come back forever! Everyone's life is at stake."

It was the first time in Bengali cinema that a film is made with so much of risks and challenges. Dev said, "Chander Pahar is going to be the biggest challenge in my life and I'm not afraid. Being afraid will mean no shooting for the project."

==== Sequence with African lions ====
Chander Pahar has of a sequence in which six African lions chase Dev. Though a lot of scenes involve risks, the crew was very tense about this particular scene. The chase sequence was filmed at an animal farm for three days. During this scene, the director and cinematographer stayed in an open cage with three sides closed. The distance between Dev and the lions was measured by the examiner of the lions. Pieces of meat were used to tempt them. Dev had to run as the director said "Action", with six lions chasing him. Then he had to enter the cage while running and the opening of the cage was shut immediately. According to the director Kamaleshwar Mukherjee, lions are very lazy and don't even get up for four days after having a meal. The lions used were not given food for three days. After this shot, Dev said, "During my shoot with the lion, I went closer than what director Kamaleswar Mukhopadhyay had wanted. And he reprimanded me on this count."

==== Sequence with Black mamba ====
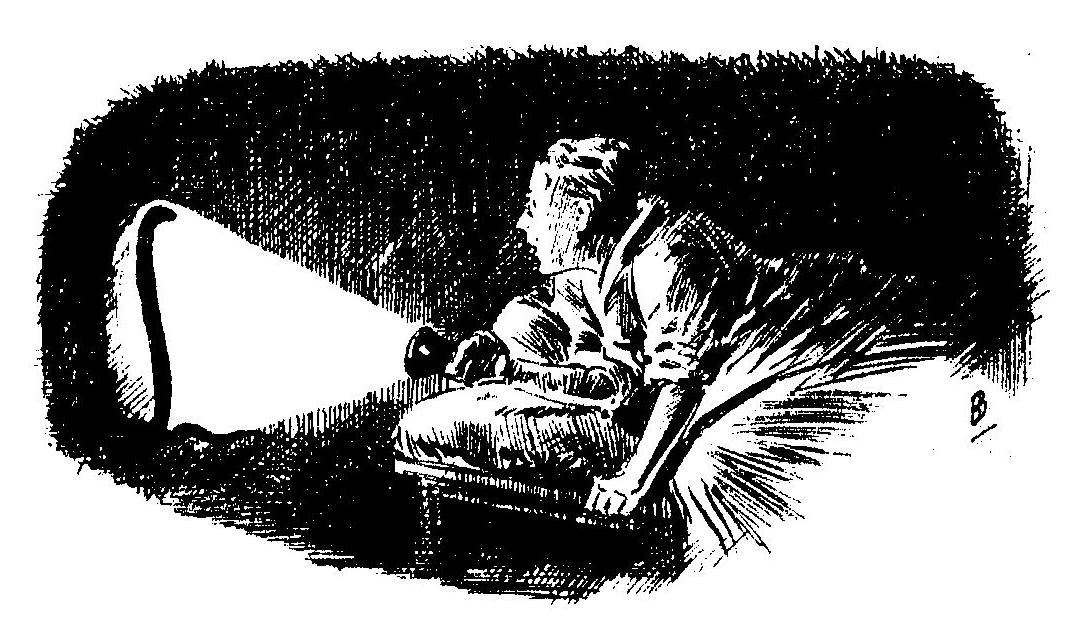
Picture of Shankar facing a Black mamba in the original book.

The novel Chander Pahar has a story where the protagonist Shankar has a face-to-face experience with Africa's most deadliest snake, Black mamba. The shooting included a real Black mamba. Director Kamaleshwar Mukherjee said that the local people were telling the pre-production team how the Black mamba had bitten at least someone of the crew of a film in 80% of shooting cases. The most threatening fact was that the venom of Black mamba cannot be taken out. Thus, the shooting of Chander Pahar has a life-threatening sequence with a venomous snake. Mukherjee added that the largest risk in this sequence will be of the cinematographer, Soumik Haldar, who confidently said that he will be positively doing his work since he had already decided to do that. It was later revealed that to prevent risk, a glass sheet was over the snake and the camera so that, if the snake attacks, the sheet will be dropped.

==== Shooting spot ====
There were life-threatening risks with the other 35 artists. The grassland, where the shooting took place is very dangerous, is full of snakes; most of the crew was afraid. Abhishek Daga, the executive producer said that carbolic acid will be used where the shooting will take place, and everyone will wear ankle-high boots. Also, during the chase sequence with the lions, the entire shooting spot will be fenced with electric fences so that giraffes or deer don't enter the set as that can prove dangerous.

Small base camps were made for the shooting, where the crew members stayed. They were surrounded by electric fences because lions may destroy them if angry and it has occurred before. Other than lions and Black mamba, shooting featured other wild animals such as Python, hyena, crocodile, cheetah, hippopotamus, Puff adder, viper and wild scorpions, some of which are extremely venomous. "Every animal will be shot real and alive with no use of computer graphics!" said Dev.

A 22-year-old Bengali boy named Sundar trained the hyenas. There is so much risk in the shooting that the crew is bound to keep mobile phones and ambulances so that they can be taken to a hospital. Even it is said that helicopters would be kept so that no time is wasted.

==== Sequence with African elephants ====
The film had featured a chase sequence with six African elephants. "The local people said that the sequence with African elephants is even riskier than those with African lions and Black mamba. If the elephants somehow get angry, no one will return alive!" said Kamaleshwar Mukherjee. The favorite thing about African elephants is oranges: Oranges were thrown towards the sky from a distance to attract their attention. As the elephants will run to get the oranges, Dev has to run preceding them. Kamaleshwar added, "The local stuntmen assured us that there is nothing to fear. Once they raise their hands and tell the elephants to stop, the herd of elephants will stop immediately."

==== Other risks ====
There were other scenes regarding which the crew members were worried initially. The production team said that the place in the Kalahari Desert where the film was shot is nearly 300 km from their hotel; the team had to cover 600 km regularly during the shoot. "The most dangerous thing is that we have to return to the presence of daylight. Otherwise, we cannot return once there is darkness over the red desert. The place is so impassable that there is no sign of roads. We will get lost. Over that, the day temperature there is 50 degrees. And the night temperature is 4 degrees," said Kamaleshwar Mukherjee before the filming.

Other than the Kalahari Desert part, the film features actor Dev in a rock climbing sequence. It was shot at such a mountain that, if one fell, he would go down 500 feet. There is also a sequence of Dev inside an old cave with a Python.

It was reported that the Chander Pahar team had to face a Mozambique spitting cobra while shooting a scene.

==== Other precautions ====
- For the full shooting, life insurance for ₹50 million (US$520,000) was made for Dev.
- Use of sunglasses, deodorant, and aftershave was strictly prohibited at shooting as it may disturb the wild animals.
- Smoking is strictly prohibited as a preventive to forest fires.
- The weight of the lions will be over 150 kg and their height will be 3 feet.
- No wild animal can be used for shooting for over 2 hours.
- Eating any sorts of non-veg food items and even using tomato sauce is forbidden as their scent may distract the wild animals.
- Electric fences should surround every shooting location.
- Carbolic acid should be used in every shooting location to prevent the entry of snakes.
- The film used original models of weapons like Springfield Bolt Action, Winchester Repeater, Gewehr 88 Mauser, Colt Six Shooter, boot knives and axe, among others.

==== Locations ====
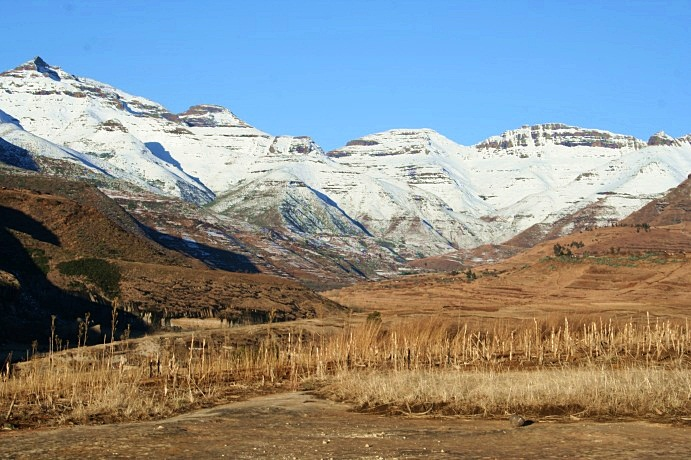
Drakensberg Mountains, where some portions were shot. In the novel, Richtersveld mountains were mentioned. Director Kamaleshwar Mukherjee instead used Drakensberg Mountains for the purpose.

For the filming of Chander Pahar, the team camped at places in South Africa for a month. Some places near Johannesburg were finalised. Other places where filming took place include the jungles of Mpumalanga, Elands River valley, Blyde River Canyon, Kruger National Park, mountains of Drakensberg and the Kalahari Desert. The film was also shot in Kenya and Uganda. Locations within West Bengal include Bolpur, where the portions of Shankar's village and home were shot.

Director Kamaleshwar Mukherjee said,

"Near Johannesburg and the province of Mpumalanga, there are forests, streams and game parks that are quite spectacular, which would be great on screen. Once we'd decided on the locations in and around Kruger National Park, my directorial team set out for the mountains of Drakensberg and the deserts of Kalahari. Drakensberg has numerous valleys, water bodies and trails that could serve for the famous Richtersveld Mountains described in the novel. The Sentinel peak and KwaZulu-Natal offer brilliant vistas, but visually, the Kalahari is the most stunning. Like all deserts, the temperature varies from 51°C in the day to 5°C in the evening. About 17 years ago, an Italian film was shot there and since then the furious desert hasn't witnessed a camera. There is one single lodging facility about three hours away from the core area. But we will shoot there anyway."

==== Tribes ====
A number of tribes of Africa are shown in this film: Swahilis, Somalis, Maasais, Matabeles and Zulus.

=== Visual effects ===
Some special scenes were made with the help of computer graphics. The most notable of these is the eruption of the volcano and the sequence featuring the monster called Bunyip.

== Soundtrack ==
Initially, composer Debojyoti Mishra, who had earlier worked in Kamaleshwar Mukherjee's Uro Chithi and Meghe Dhaka Tara was signed to compose the film score for Chander Pahar. But just before a few days of the film's release, he was replaced by Indraadip Das Gupta. Producer Shrikant Mohta stated the reason that Debojyoti's music didn't quite suit the film well and that's why they were bound to approach Indraadip.

According to Indraadip, the producers did approach him and asked him that how long he would take to compose the film score for a film, to which he replied that it could be done in 4 days. He added, "Then, I was asked to work on Chander Pahar. I was astounded since it's a big-canvas story. While Mishawr Rawhoshyo was quite a challenge, this is an even bigger task. I will have to work on the background score and the title track apart from a few other pieces of music. I spoke to my team and they gave their nod. I'll have to work extra hard to complete the score as the film's release is nearing."

All lyrics are written by Srijato; all music is composed by Indraadip Dasgupta.

Track listing
No.	Title	Lyrics	Singer(s)	Length
1.	"Chander Pahar"	Srijato	Arijit Singh	6:32
Total length:				6:32

== Release ==
=== Marketing ===
==== First look and trailer ====
Though by early 2013, the production house had yet not released any official poster of Chander Pahar, a large number of unofficial posters designed by graphic designers were promoted in social networking sites such as Facebook and Twitter, featuring only Dev in the foreground and background somehow similar to the official cover art of the novel. It was later found out that some of these were unofficial versions and morphed screenshots from the 2011 Australian movie The Hunter.

On 14 November 2013, during the occasion of Children's Day, the first theatrical trailer of the film was released by Shree Venkatesh Films, at the Kolkata Nicco park. Upon its release, the trailer went viral on the web and managed to receive 32,000+ viewers on YouTube on the first day itself. Soon, the trailer got 100,000+ viewers in just 3 days, which was the first for any Bengali film.

Apart from these, back to back episodes were released by Shree Venkatesh Films at their official YouTube channel for promotion, under the name of 'Chander Pahar Diaries', which provided various glimpses of the filming:

Episode No.	Title	Release date	Ref.
1	Gerard Rudolf	28 November 2013	
2	Lion The King Part I	29 November 2013	
3	Columbus Vs Shankar Part I	30 November 2013	
4	Columbus Vs Shankar Part II	2 December 2013	
5	African Food Safari	3 December 2013	
6	The Tribes - Zulu & Massai	4 December 2013	

==== Release ====
Chander Pahar was released on 22 December 2013 in nearly 200 theaters in West Bengal, which was the widest released Bengali film in that state at that point.

== Reception ==
Chander Pahar received overwhelming response from the critics and audiences both. The film received positive reviews.

The Times Of India gave 3.5 stars out of 5 and said "It's give a feels like Life Of Pi". They wrote "Our Tollywood voyagers may have arrived two centuries after the African explorer, but they haven't missed his advice. So there's much effort and a lot of sweat in Chander Pahar. Bullets fly, lions roar, spiders crawl. The director and the actor do their best: marching, plodding, running, galloping — but sadly, never really soaring with the film."

Anandabazar Patrika gave 8.5 stars out of 10 and stated this film as "The Sholay of Bengali Film" E Bela Patrika gave 8 stars out of 10. Box Office India and The Daily Star called this as the "New Boundary of Indian Cinema."

Ei Samay wrote "Most of all (though the book and film are different mediums) fictional Shankar doesn't get bogged down in reality. Screenwriter and director Kamleswar Mukhopadhyay weaves them in with a deft hand."

Anjan Dutt of The Telegraph wrote "To me it looks and feels far bigger than a 15 crore project. Far glorious than many bigger budget Hindi adventures I have ever seen. When I read Chander Pahar for the first time I felt very proud to be a Bong. But buddy, Kamaleswar, I felt a greater pride to be part of this Bong industry after watching Chander Pahar. It raises the bar. The crux of the review folks is that whether you are a Bong or not, if you live in Bengal, Chander Pahar is a must watch. If you do not you will perhaps miss history. If you wait to watch it on the small screen or DVD, it would be like listening to a live Ravi Shankar on a cheap tape recorder."

USA based magazine Variety wrote "The movie's heart is clearly in the right place; writer-director Mukherjee honors his characters for being loyal and tolerant, and he clearly has a feeling for the beauty of the African countryside. He takes his camera and his plucky actors up one mountain after another, framing them against golden landscapes that seem to go on forever."

The Washington Post wrote "Director Kamaleswar Mukherjee shot the film primarily in South Africa, and the vistors and animals are breathtaking. In some ways, the movie feels like an excuse to go to Africa and film wildlife. The source material ends up shoehorned between splashy images of springboks and hippos, and any gaps are filled with CGI. But when adapting an acclaimed book, it's probably smart to let the plot steal the show."

== Box office ==
Chander Pahar was released on 20 December 2013 along with the challenge of Dhoom 3. As it is a festival time release, Chander Pahar beat Dhoom 3 in Kolkata and Eastern India. The first day collection of Chander Pahar in West Bengal is about ₹90 lakh (equivalent to ₹1.7 crore or US$170,000 in 2026) by breaking the previous highest records of Bengali film industry. In Sunday the film collect 1 crore which was the highest collection ever in a single day at that time. It had a collection of ₹4.83 crore in the first week. The film completed 100 days in Bengal Box Office. The film overall gross collection is 25 crore including the satellite value while Dhoom 3 collected 12 crore. Film became highest grosser of that year and second highest grossing Bengali film of all time.

== Awards and nominations ==
Award name	Result
Filmfare Awards East for Best Film – Bengali	Won
Filmfare Awards East for Best Director – Bengali - Kamaleshwar Mukherjee	Nominated
Filmfare Awards East for Best Actor Male – Bengali - (Dev)	Nominated
Tollywood National Award for Best film	Won
Tollywood National Award for Best film in critics	Won
Tollywood National Award for Best Actor (Male) (Dev)	Won
Star Jalsha Entertainment Award for Best Film of the year	Won
Star Jalsha Entertainment Award for Best Actor (Dev)	Won
Zee Bangla Gourab Somman Awards for Biggest Superhit film of the year	Won
Zee Bangla Gourab Somman Awards for Best Actor (Male) (Dev)	Won
Zee Bangla Gourab Somman Awards for Best Director Kamaleshwar Mukherjee	Won
Kalakar Awards for Best Actor (Dev)	Won
Kalakar Awards for Best Film	Won
Kalakar Awards for Best Director (Kamaleshwar Mukherjee)	Won

== Sequel ==
After the success of Chander Pahar a sequel was made as Amazon Obhijaan which was released on 22 December 2017.

== See also ==
- List of highest-grossing Bengali films
- Dev (Bengali actor)
