= Kamaleshwar Mukherjee =

Indian Bengali film director and actor

Doctor Kamaleswar Mukherjee
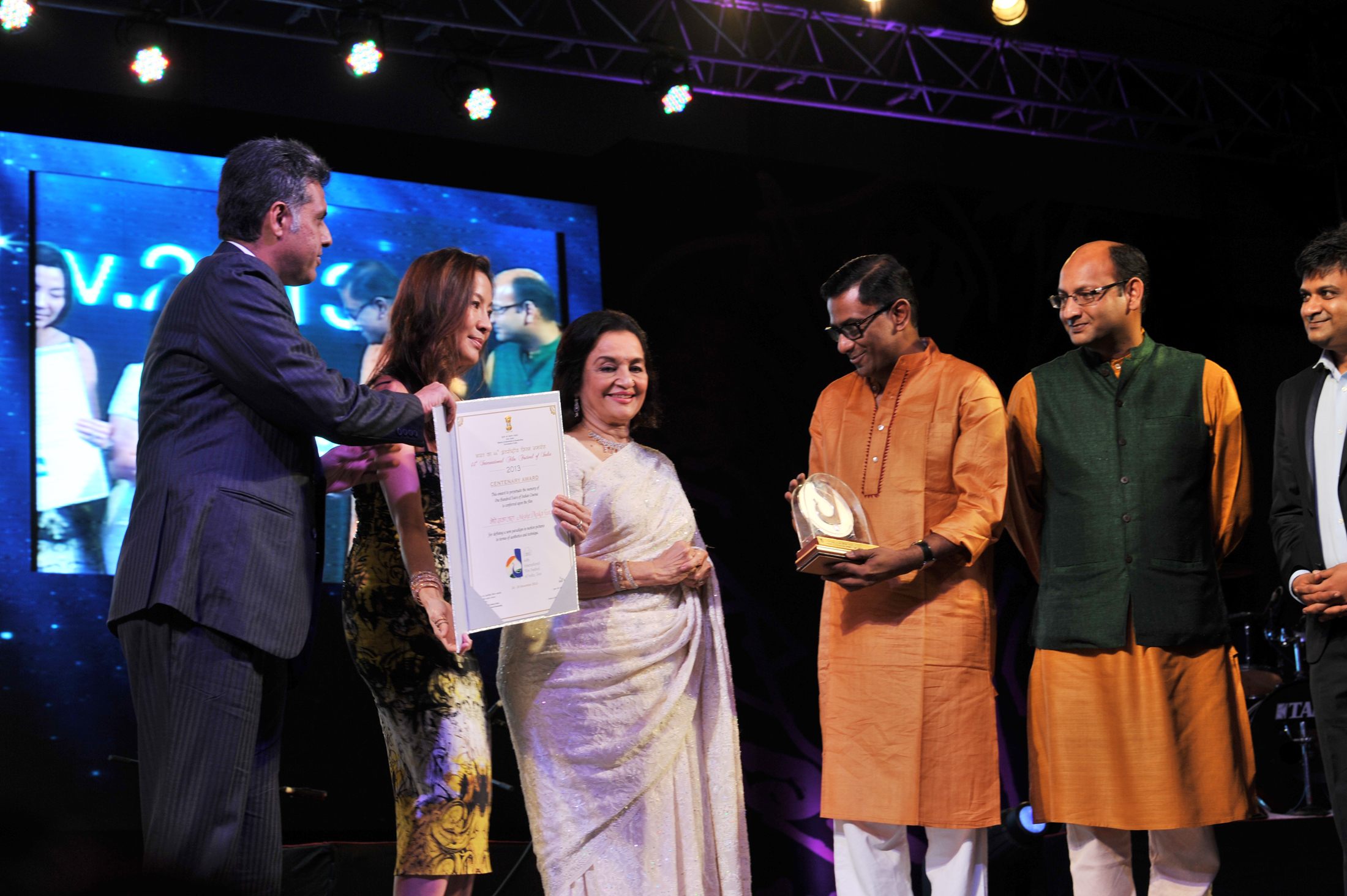
- Mukherjee at the 44th International Film Festival of India
- Born: 25 October 1964 (age 61); Kolkata, West Bengal, India
- Education: St. Lawrence High School, Kolkata
- Alma mater: Medical College and Hospital, Kolkata (M.B.B.S.)
- Occupations: Film director; screenwriter; actor
- Known for: Meghe Dhaka Tara; Chander Pahar; Amazon Obhijaan; Cockpit; Password

Kamaleswar Mukherjee is an Indian film director, actor, and physician known for his work in Bengali film industry. He has directed multiple highest grossing Bengali films including Chander Pahar (2013), Amazon Obhijaan (2017) and Cockpit (2017).

== Early life and education ==
Kamaleswar Mukherjee is a physician by training. He attended St. Lawrence High School, Kolkata and is an alumnus of the Medical College and Hospital, Kolkata. He transitioned from the medical profession first to Group Theatre, then to the advertising world, and then to filmmaking. After working as an advertisement filmmaker, Mukherjee wrote dialogues, screenplays, and songs for the film Natobor Not Out (2010).

== Career ==
His directorial debut, the well acclaimed film Uro Chithi was released in 2011. The film interwove 12 text messages with 12 different characters, combining shades of life spanning across 12 months. His next venture was Meghe Dhaka Tara, inspired by the life and works of Bengali filmmaker, Ritwik Ghatak. The film portrayed the period of Ghatak's life when he was admitted into a mental asylum for treatment. Meghe Dhaka Tara was critically acclaimed and it won the International Film Festival of India Centenary Award.

His next film was Chander Pahar (2013), based on an eponymous novel by Bibhutibhushan Bandyopadhyay. Chander Pahar is the second costliest film made in Indian Bengali film industry and is one of the highest grossing Indian Bengali films of all time. The film received huge critical acclaim. Then he made the film Khawto, that deals with the love story of an eminent urban author in self imposed asylum near the sea. In 2017, Mukherjee wrote and directed Amazon Obhijaan, the sequel to Chander Pahar. It is most expensive Indian Bengali film ever made. The film grossed around ₹50 crore and emerged as the highest grossing Bengali film of all time. Further, he has directed multiple films including Cockpit - dealing with the life and journey of a pilot, Good Night City based on the conflict between a psychiatrist and a schizophrenic man, Mukhomukhi - a surreal representation of modern-day urban angst and living and Password - a story relating to cybercrime.

As an actor he has performed in a lot of films. Mukherjee is also a playwright, director and the founder member of Kolkata‐based theatre group "Shailushik". He is also trained in photography and computer graphics.

== Filmography ==
=== Feature films ===
Key
†	Denotes films that have not yet been released

Year	Film	Director	Writer	Actor	Role	Notes	Ref.
2010	Notobor Notout	No	Yes	No	—N/a		
2011	Uro Chithi	Yes	Yes	No	—N/a		
2013	Meghe Dhaka Tara	Yes	Yes	No	—N/a	Centenary Award at International Film Festival of India, Goa 2013; Silver Crow Pheasant Award for the Best Director at International Film Festival of Kerala, 2013; NETPAC Award International Film Festival of Kerala, 2013	
2013	Mishawr Rawhoshyo	No	No	Yes	Sadat Manto	Cameo appearance	
2013	Chander Pahar	Yes	No	No	—N/a	Nominated for Filmfare Awards East for Best Director – Bengali; Zee Bangla Gourab Somman Awards for Best Director; Kalakar Awards for Best Director	
2014	Obhishopto Nighty	No	No	Yes	A news reporter	Cameo appearance	
2014	Khaad	No	No	Yes	Rajib, a trekker		
2014	Force	No	No	Yes	Police commissioner		
2015	Arshinagar	No	No	Yes	Salim Saab, a music teacher		
2015	13 Number Tarachand Lane	Yes	Yes	No	—N/a	Zee Bangla Originals	
2015	Onno Bosonto	No	No	Yes	Bride's father		
2016	Khawto	Yes	Yes	No	—N/a		
2017	Chaamp	No	No	Yes	Reporter Shantanu		
2017	Meghnad Badh Rahasya	No	No	Yes	Badal Biswas		
2017	Cockpit	Yes	Yes	No	—N/a		
2017	Soshibhushan	No	No	Yes	Sashi Babu		
2017	Amazon Obhijaan	Yes	Yes	No	—N/a		
2018	Kabir	No	No	Yes	IPS Dulal Roy Chattopadhyay		
2018	Guptodhoner Sandhane	No	No	Yes	Akhilesh Majumdar		
2018	Goodnight City	Yes	No	No	—N/a		
2019	Mukhomukhi	Yes	Yes	No	—N/a		
2019	Durgeshgorer Guptodhon	No	No	Yes	Akhilesh Majumdar		
2019	Kidnap	No	No	Yes	Newspaper Office Head		
2019	Password	Yes	No	No	—N/a		
2020	Dwitiyo Purush	No	No	Yes	Commissioner Dibakar Bose		
2021	Anusandhan	Yes	Yes	Yes	Boss		
2022	Kishmish	No	No	Yes	Ashim Sen		
2022	Karnasubarner Guptodhon	No	No	Yes	Akhilesh Majumdar		
2023	Amader Somporko	No	No	Yes	—N/a		
2023	Borfi	No	No	Yes	—N/a		
2023	Mayaa	No	No	Yes	Darbar Sharma		
2023	A Separate Sky	No	No	Yes	Akhilesh Mukherjee		
2023	Ektu Sore Bosun	Yes	Yes	No	—N/a		
2025	Aarii	No	No	Yes	Barundeb		
2026	Ami Amar Moto	Yes	Yes	No	—N/a		

=== Web series ===
Year	Title	Director	Writer	Actor	Role	Language	Platform	Notes	Ref.
2021	Mohomaya	Yes	No	Yes	A doctor	Bengali	Hoichoi	Directorial as well as acting debut in a web series; Cameo appearance	
2021	Dujone	No	No	Yes	IB Chief	Bengali	Hoichoi		
2022	Roktopolash	Yes	Yes	Yes	—N/a	Bengali	Klikk		
2022	Johny Bonny	No	No	Yes	Promod Sen	Bengali	Klikk		
2023	Shabash Feluda	No	No	Yes	Mohandas Mehta	Bengali	ZEE5		
2023	Chhotolok	No	No	Yes	Gopal Manna	Bengali	ZEE5		
2024	Talmar Romeo Juliet	No	No	Yes	Badal Majumder	Bengali	Hoichoi		

=== Television ===
- Mahisasuramardini (director),2019, Star Jalsha
- Durga Durgatinashini (director),2020, Star Jalsha

== Bibliography ==
- Amazon Obhijaan (Graphic novel), 2017, Bee Books

== Awards and nominations ==
Year	Award	Category	Film	Result	Ref.
2013	International Film Festival of India, Goa 2013	Centenary Award	Meghe Dhaka Tara	Won	
2013	International Film Festival of Kerala, 2013	Silver Crow Pheasant Award for Best Director	Meghe Dhaka Tara	Won	
2013	International Film Festival of Kerala, 2013	NETPAC Award	Meghe Dhaka Tara	Won	
2014	1st Filmfare Awards East	Filmfare Award for Best Director	Chander Pahar	Nominated	
2014	Zee Bangla Gourab Somman	Zee Bangla Gourab Somman for Best Director	Chander Pahar	Won	
2014	Kalakar Awards	Kalakar Awards for Best Director	Chander Pahar	Won	
2022	West Bengal Film Journalists' Association Awards	WBFJA Award for Best Screenplay	Anusandhan	Won	
