= List of awards and nominations received by Dev (Bengali actor) =

Dev awards and nominations
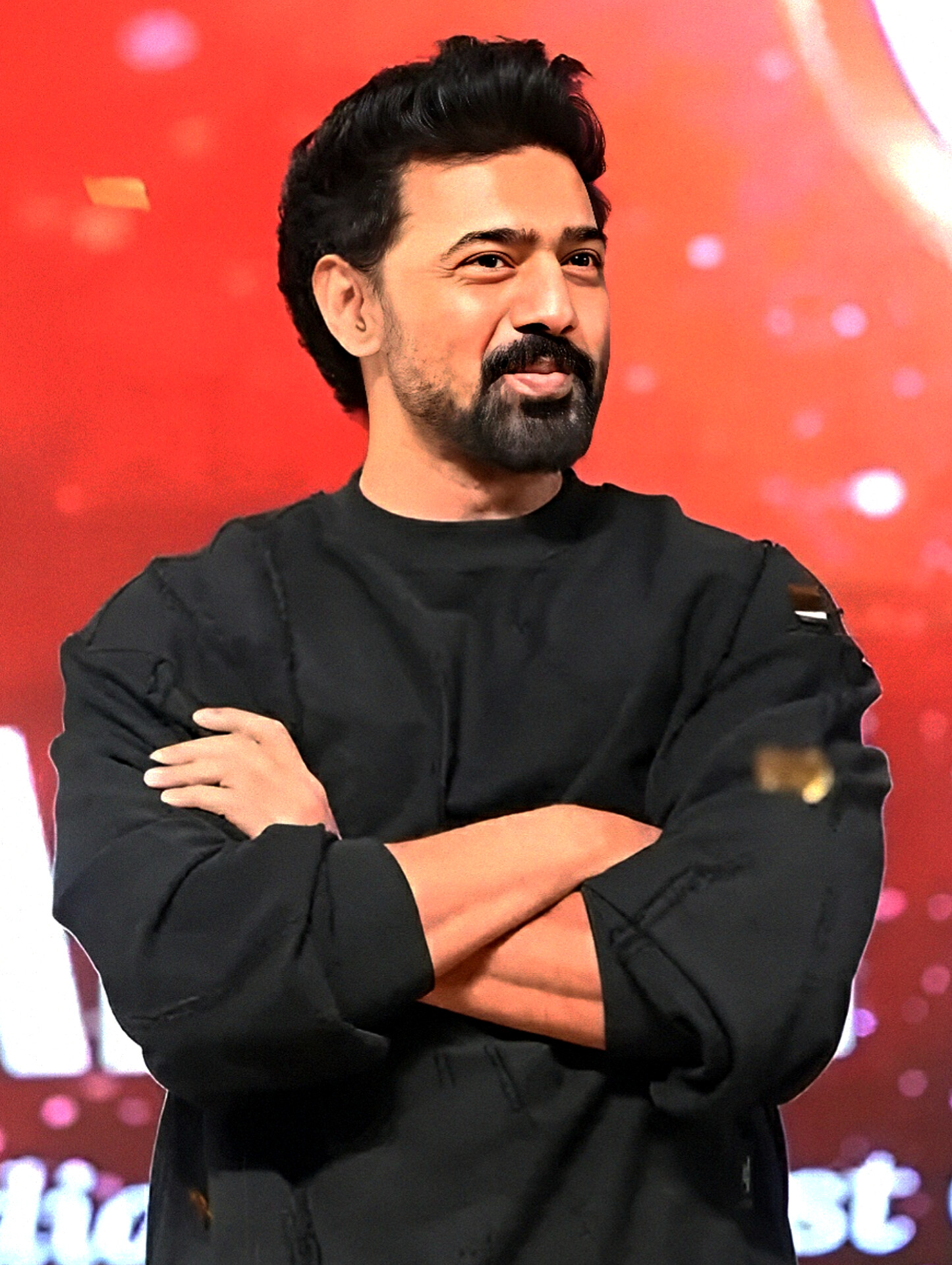
- Dev in 2026
Awards and nominations
Award	Wins	Nominations
Anandalok Awards	4	2
Tele Cine Awards	6	0
Kalakar Awards	2	0
Bengal Film Journalists' Association Awards	1	0
Filmfare Awards East	1	1
Other awards	18	4

Totals (Note: Certain award groups do not simply award one winner. They acknowledge several different recipients, have runners-up, and have third place. Since this is a specific recognition and is different from losing an award, runner-up mentions are considered wins in this award tally. For simplification and to avoid errors, each award in this list has been presumed to have had a prior nomination.)
- Wins: 43
- Nominations: 17

Dev (born Deepak Adhikari on 25 December 1982) is an Indian actor, producer, singer and screenwriter, known for his works in Bengali cinema, and more recently, a politician. He owns the production house Dev Entertainment Ventures Pvt. Ltd.. He is also one of the Highest Paid Bengali actors.

He made come back on the silver screen with Premer Kahini, opposite Koel Mullick, his first with whom he went on to star with in numerous films. A remake of the Kannada hit Mungaru Male, the film was moderately successful. Dev got another breakthrough in Challenge which opened to critical and commercial success. He received the Anandalok Awards for Best Actor and Best Action Hero for his performance in the film. He continued to garner commercial success and wider attention through his successful films, including Le Chakka, Dui Prithibi, Paglu, Challenge 2, Khoka 420, Rangbaaz and Chander Pahar.

He had been a recipient of numerous awards, namely Tele Cine Awards, Kalakar Awards, Filmfare Awards East, Filmfare Awards East (2017) & NABC International Bangla Film Award 2017. His accomplishments have made him one of the highest paid and sought out actors of Bengali cinema. Though he has delivered some critically acclaimed performances, Dev is often trolled for his poor accent, average acting skills, his winning of the Mahanayak Samman from the Government of West Bengal and his work as a politician. In 2022 he was awarded Banga Bhushan by the chief minister of West Bengal Mamata Banerjee.

== Awards and nominations ==
Year	Award	Category	Film	Result	Ref.
2009	Anandalok Awards	Anandalok Award for Best Actor	Challenge	Won	
2009	Anandalok Awards	Anandalok Award for Best Action Hero	Challenge	Won	
2010	Star Jalsha Entertainment Awards	Star Jalsha Entertainment Award for Best Actor	Paran Jai Jaliya Re	Won	
2010	Star Jalsha Entertainment Awards	Star Jalsha Entertainment Award for Best Actor	Dujone	Nominated	
2010	Tele Cine Awards	Tele Cine Awards for Best Actor	Challenge	Won	
2010	Kalakar Awards	Kalakar Award for Best Actor	Challenge	Won	
2010	Star Ananda Shera Bangali Awards	STAR Ananda Shera Notun Protibha Award	—N/a	Won	
2010	Anandalok Awards	Anandalok Award for Best Actor (Male)	Le Chakka	Won	
2011	Big Bangla Movie Awards	Big Bangla Movie Award for Best Actor of the Decade	—N/a	Won	
2011	Anandalok Awards	Anandalok Award for Best Actor	Paglu	Nominated	
2011	Star Jalsha Entertainment Awards	Star Jalsha Entertainment Award for Best Dancing Sensation	—N/a	Won	
2011	Zee Banglar Gourab Samman Awards	Zee Bangla Award for Best Actor	Le Chakka	Nominated	
2012	Star Guide Bengali film Awards	Star Guide Bengali film Award for Best Actor	Paglu	Won	
2012	Anandalok Awards	Anandalok Award for Best Actor (Male)	Paglu 2	Nominated	
2012	Zee Banglar Gourab Samman Awards	Zee Bangla Award for Best Actor	Paglu	Won	
2012	11th Tele Cine Awards	Tele Cine Award for Best Actor	Paglu	Won	
2012	Kalakar Awards	Kalakar Award for Best Actor	Paglu	Won	
2013	12th Tele Cine Awards	Tele Cine Award for Best Actor	Challenge 2	Nominated	
2014	Most Desirable Tollywood Actor (Public Poll)	Best Actor	Rangbaaz	Won	
2014	Most Desirable Tollywood Actor (Public Poll)	Best Actor	Chander Pahar	Nominated	
2014	Tollywood National Award	Best Actor	Chander Pahar	Won	
2014	Tollywood National Award	Best Romantic Hero	Khoka 420	Nominated	
2014	Tollywood National Award	Best Action Hero	Rangbaaz	Won	
2014	Kalakar Awards	Kalakar Award for Best Actor	• Rangbaaz • Chander Pahar	Won	
2014	Bengal Film Journalists' Association Awards	Best Actor	Khokababu	Won	
2014	"Mahanayak Samman" by Government of West Bengal	—N/a	—N/a	Won	
2014	Zee Bangla Gourab Somman Awards	Best Actor	Chander Pahar	Won	
2014	Anandalok Awards	Best Actor	Chander Pahar	Won	
2014	Filmfare Awards East	Global East People's Choice Filmfare Award	—N/a	Won	
2014	13th Tele Cine Awards	Best Actor	Chander Pahar	Won	
2014	13th Tele Cine Awards	Best Jodi (Dev-Koel)	Rangbaaz	Won	
2015	14th Tele Cine Awards	Best Actor	Buno Haansh	Won	
2015	14th Tele Cine Awards	Best Jodi (Dev-Srabanti)	Buno Haansh	Won	
2017	1st WBJFA Awards	Most Popular Actor of the Year.	Zulfiqar	Won	
2017	Filmfare Awards East	Best Actor	Zulfiqar	Nominated	
2017	NABC International Bangla Film Award	Best Actor (Commercial)	Zulfiqar	Won	
2020	4th WBFJA Award	Most Popular Actor	Sanjhbati	Won	
2021	4th Filmfare Awards Bangla	Filmfare Award Bangla for Best Actor	Sanjhbati	Nominated	
2022	"Banga Bhushan" by Government of West Bengal	—N/a	—N/a	Won	
2022	5th Filmfare Awards Bangla	Filmfare Award Bangla for Best Actor	Golondaaj	Nominated	
2022	5th WBFJA Award	Most Popular Actor	Tonic	Won	
2023	6th Filmfare Awards Bangla	Filmfare Award Bangla for Best Actor	Kachher Manush	Nominated	
2023	6th WBFJA Awards	Best Actor	Projapati	Won	
2024	7th WBFJA Award	Most Popular Actor	Pradhan	Won	
2024	7th Filmfare Awards Bangla	Filmfare Award Bangla for Best Actor	• Pradhan • Bagha Jatin	Nominated	
2024	TV9 Bangla Ghorer Bioscope Awards	Best Actor	Projapoti	Won	
2025	8th Filmfare Awards Bangla	Best Actor	Khadaan	Nominated	
2025	Filmfare Glamour & Style Awards West Bengal 2025	Most Glamorous Star	—N/a	Won	
2025	Filmfare Glamour & Style Awards West Bengal 2025	Hottest Star of the year	—N/a	Won	
2025	8th WBFJA Awards	Best Actor	Tekka	Nominated	
2025	8th WBFJA Awards	Most Popular Actor	Khadaan	Won	
2025	22nd Tele Cine Awards	Best Actor	Khadaan	Nominated	
2025	Anandalok Puraskar	Best Actor(Critics)	Khadaan	Won	
2026	Zee 24 Ghanta Binodoner Sera 24	Best Actor	Projapati 2	Won	
2026	9th WBFJA Awards	Most Popular Actor	Dhumketu	Nominated	
2026	9th WBFJA Awards	Best Actor	Projapati 2	Won	
2026	Star Jalsha Parivaar Awards	Best Host Award	—N/a	Won	
2026	Anandabazar Patrika Bochorer Best	Social Soldier	—N/a	Won	

== Dadagiri(TV Show) ==
Season	Episode	District	Result
Season 8	41	Paschim Medinipur	Winner
Season 9	4	Paschim Medinipur	Runner-up
Season 10	27	Paschim Medinipur	Winner

== See also ==
- Dev filmography
