= Dev filmography =

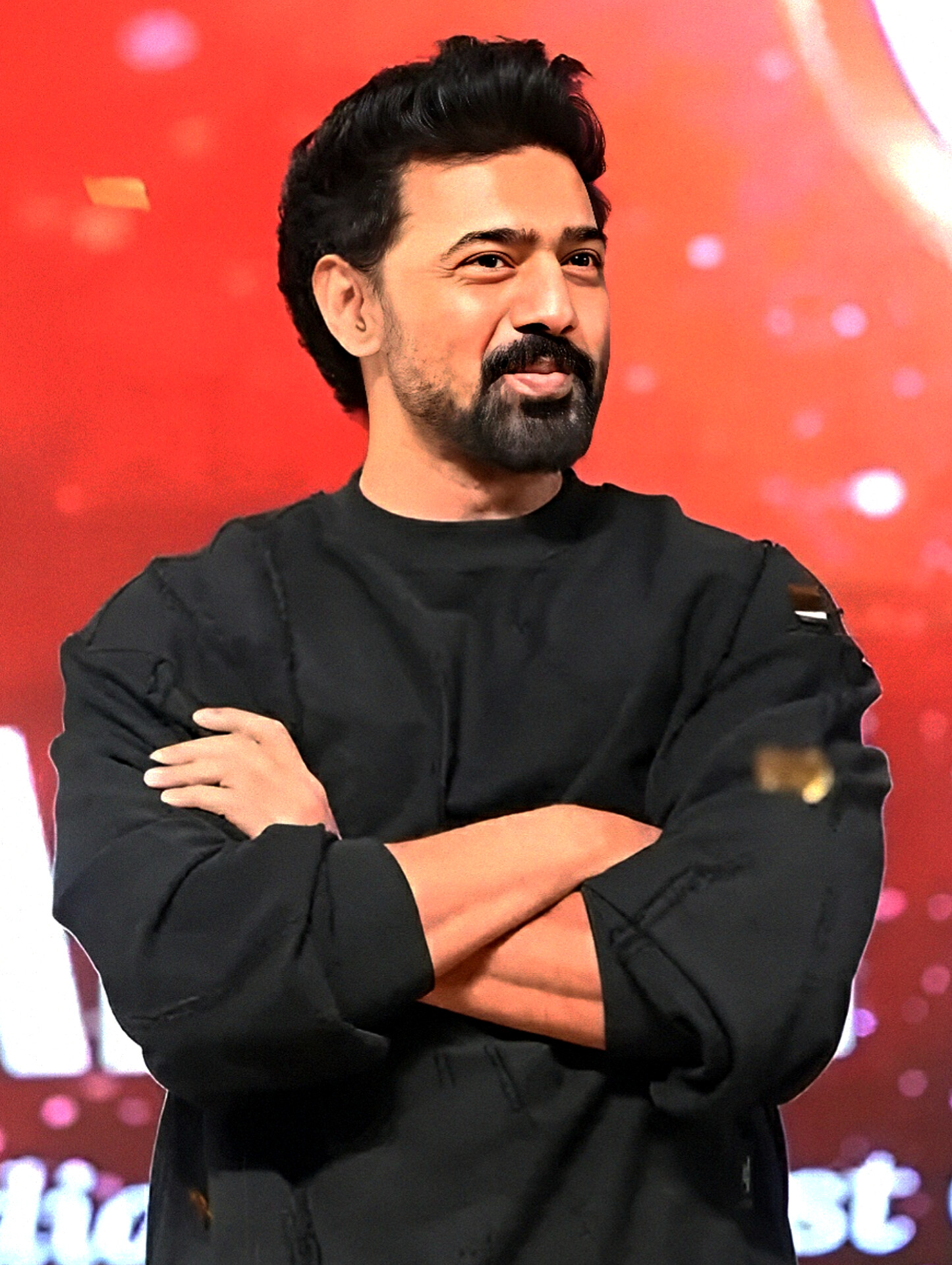
Dev in 2026

Dev, is an Indian actor who works primarily in the Bengali film industry. He made his acting debut with the Bengali film Agnishapath although it ultimately turned up to be a commercial failure. He later signed up Ravi Kinagi's Bengali film I Love You which was the actual breakthrough for his career in Tollywood.

== Film ==
Key
| † | Denotes films that have not yet been released |

| Year | Title | Role | Notes | Ref. |
|---|---|---|---|---|
| 2006 | Agnishapath | Jeet Singh | Debut | |
| 2007 | I Love You | Rahul Chowdhury | | |
| 2008 | Premer Kahini | Akash | | |
| 2008 | Chirodini Tumi Je Amar | Himself | Guest Appearance in "Pante Taali" song | |
| 2008 | Mon Mane Na | Rahul | | |
| 2009 | Jackpot | Himself | Guest Appearance in "Jibone Ki Pabo Na" song | |
| 2009 | Challenge | Abir | | |
| 2009 | Paran Jai Jaliya Re | Raj | | |
| 2009 | Dujone | Akash Banerjee | | |
| 2010 | Bolo Na Tumi Aamar | Abhishek Dutta | | |
| 2010 | Le Chakka | Abir Basu | | |
| 2010 | Ekti Tarar Khonje | Himself | Guest Appearance | |
| 2010 | Dui Prithibi | Shibu | | |
| 2010 | Shedin Dekha Hoyechilo | Abir / Khoka (Note: He played a single character with multiple names) | | |
| 2011 | Paglu | Dev / Paglu | | |
| 2011 | Romeo | Siddhartha Roy / Sidhu | | |
| 2012 | Khokababu | Abir Roy / Khoka | | |
| 2012 | Paglu 2 | Dev / Paglu | | |
| 2012 | Challenge 2 | Abhiraj Roy IPS / Ruhidas Paul | | |
| 2012 | Bawali Unlimited | Inspector Joy Banerjee | Cameo | |
| 2013 | Khoka 420 | Krish / Khoka | | |
| 2013 | Rangbaaz | Raj | | |
| 2013 | Chander Pahar | Shankar Ray Choudhuri | Nominated—Filmfare Award Bangla for Best Actor | |
| 2014 | Obhishopto Nighty | Himself | Cameo | |
| 2014 | Bindaas | Abhimanyu Sen | | |
| 2014 | Buno Haansh | Amal Kumar Biswas | | |
| 2014 | Yoddha | Rudra Pratap, Abir (Note: He played dual roles in the film) | | |
| 2015 | Herogiri | Subhadip "Subho" Burman / Raj | | |
| 2015 | Shudhu Tomari Jonyo | Aditya Sen | | |
| 2015 | Arshinagar | Ronojit Mitra / Rono | 25th film | |
| 2016 | Dev I Love You | Himself | Voiceover | |
| 2016 | Kelor Kirti | Guru | | |
| 2016 | Love Express | Raktim Prasad Gangopadhyay / Laal | | |
| 2016 | Zulfiqar (Note: He played a dumb character in the film) | Markaz Ali | Nominated—Filmfare Award Bangla for Best Actor | |
| 2017 | Chaamp | Shibaji Sanyal / Shiba | Nominated—Filmfare Award Bangla for Best Actor; Also debut as producer | |
| 2017 | Cockpit | Capt. Dibyendu Rakshit | Also producer | |
| 2017 | Amazon Obhijaan | Shankar Ray Choudhuri | | |
| 2018 | Kabir | Abir Chatterjee / DSP Altaf Kabir (STF Officer) | Also producer | |
| 2018 | Uma | Himself | Special Appearance in "Jaago Uma" song | |
| 2018 | Ahare Mon | Himself | Cameo; Also producer | |
| 2018 | Hoichoi Unlimited | Kumar Chowdhury | Also producer | |
| 2019 | Kidnap | Dev | | |
| 2019 | Password | DCP Rohit Dasgupta | Also producer | |
| 2019 | Sanjhbati | Chandan Chatterjee / Chandu | Nominated—Filmfare Award Bangla for Best Actor; Also producer | |
| 2021 | Golondaaj | Nagendra Prasad Sarbadhikari | Nominated—Filmfare Award Bangla for Best Actor | |
| 2021 | Tonic | Tonic | Also producer | |
| 2022 | Kishmish | Krishanu Chatterjee / Tintin | Also producer | |
| 2022 | Kachher Manush | Kuntal Sarkar | Nominated—Filmfare Award Bangla for Best Actor; Also producer | |
| 2022 | Projapati | Joy Chakraborty | Also producer | |
| 2023 | Byomkesh O Durgo Rahasya | Byomkesh Bakshi | Also producer | |
| 2023 | Bagha Jatin | Bagha Jatin / Jatindranath Mukherjee | Nominated—Filmfare Award Bangla for Best Actor; Also producer | |
| 2023 | Pradhan | Deepak Pradhan | Nominated—Filmfare Award Bangla for Best Actor; Also producer | |
| 2024 | Tekka | Iqlakh Alam | Also producer | |
| 2024 | Khadaan | Shyam Mahato, Madhu Mahato | Debut as creative director Nominated—Filmfare Award Bangla for Best Actor; Also producer | |
| 2025 | Dhumketu | Bhanu Singha / Indranath Khasnobish | Also producer Filmed in 2015; Released after a decade | |
| 2025 | Raghu Dakat | Raghab Dutta / Raghu Dakat / Raja | Also producer | |
| 2025 | Projapati 2 | Joy Chakraborty | Also producer | |
| 2026 | DeSu7 | Dev | 50th film; Directorial debut; Also producer | |
| 2026 | Bike Ambulance Dada † | Karimul Haque | Based on the life and works of Karimul Haque; Also Producer | |
| 2027 | Tonic 2 † | Tonic | Also Producer | |

== Television ==
| Year | Title (Reality Show) | Season | Channel | Character | Ref |
|---|---|---|---|---|---|
| 2010 | Mirakkel | 5 | Zee Bangla | (Guest) | |
| 2011 | Mirakkel | 5 | Zee Bangla | (Guest) | |
| 2011 | Sobhinoy Nibedhon | —N/a | Sananda TV | (Special appearance) | |
| 2012 | Ronger Anandey | —N/a | Sananda TV | (Special appearance) | |
| 2013 | Dadagiri Unlimited | 4 | Zee Bangla | (Guest) promoting Rangbaaz Film with Koel Mallick | |
| 2014 | Dance Bangla Dance | 8 | Zee Bangla | (Main Judge) | |
| 2019 | Dadagiri Unlimited | 8 | Zee Bangla | (Perticipate & Winner), Promoting Sanjhbati Film. | |
| 2021 | Dance Dance Junior | 2 | Star Jalsha | (Judge) with Mithun Chakraborty (Mahaguru) and Monami Ghosh | |
| 2021 | Dadagiri Unlimited | 9 | Zee Bangla | (Participate & Runner-up), promoting Tonic film | |
| 2022 | Dance Dance Junior | 3 | Star Jalsha | (Judge) along with Rukmini Maitra and Monami Ghosh | |
| 2022 | Dadagiri Unlimited | 9 | Zee Bangla | (Guest) with Rukmini Maitra | |
| 2022 | Borsho Boron 2022 | —N/a | Zee Bangla | (Host), Performer | |
| 2023 | Dadagiri Unlimited | 10 | Zee Bangla | (Participate & Winner), Promoting Bagha Jatin Film | |
| 2024 | Parivaar Awards | 7 | Star Jalsha | (Special Guest), Honored as an "Industry Icon". | |
| 2024 | Pujor Sobcheye Boro Jalsha | 1 | Star Jalsha | (Host), Performer. | |
| 2025 | Parivaar Awards | 8 | Star Jalsha | (Special Guest), Performed a reunion dance with Koel Mallick. | |
| 2025 | Pujor Sobcheye Boro Jalsha | 2 | Star Jalsha | (Host), Lead performer, featuring a "Double Dhamaka" dance with Idhika Paul. | |
| 2025 | SaReGaMaPa Bangla | 22 | Zee Bangla | (Guest), Promoting Projapati 2 Film with Idhika Paul. | |
| 2026 | Parivaar Awards | 9 | Star Jalsha | (Special Guest), Performed a reunion dance with Koel Mallick. | |
| 2026 | Dadagiri Unlimited | 11 | Zee Bangla | (Host), Taking over from Sourav Ganguly. | |
