= List of accolades received by Khadaan =

Accolades
Award	Won	Nominated
8th Filmfare Awards Bangla	1	12
8th WBFJA Awards	6	13
22nd Tele Cine Awards	6	9
- Total number of awards and nominations (Note: Awards in certain categories do not have prior nominations and only winners are announced by the jury. For simplification and to avoid errors, each award in this list has been presumed to have had a prior nomination.)
Totals	13	34
- References

Khadaan is a 2024 Indian Bengali-language action thriller film written and directed by Soojit Rino Dutta. Produced by Nispal Singh and Dev under the banners of Surinder Films and Dev Entertainment Ventures respectively, the film stars Dev in dual roles, alongside Jisshu Sengupta in the lead, with an ensemble cast of Anirban Chakrabarti, Barkha Bisht, Idhika Paul, John Bhattacharya, Partha Sarathi Chakraborty, Sneha Bose, Sujan Neel Mukherjee, Sumit Ganguly and Raja Dutta.

Made on a budget of ₹6 crore, the film was released in theatres on 20 December 2024 to positive reviews from critics and audience alike. Grossing over ₹26 crore, it became the highest grossing Bengali film of 2024 and the second highest grossing Bengali film of all time.

At the 8th Filmfare Awards Bangla, Khadaan received 14 nominations, including Best Film, Best Debut Director (Dutta) and Best Actor (Dev).

== Accolades ==
Awards (Note: Awards, festivals and organizations are in alphabetical order.)	Date of ceremony (Note: Date is linked to the article about the awards held that year, wherever possible.)	Category	Recipient(s)	Result	Ref
8th Filmfare Awards Bangla	18 March 2025	Best Film	Khadaan	Nominated	
8th Filmfare Awards Bangla	18 March 2025	Best Director	Soojit Rino Dutta	Nominated	
8th Filmfare Awards Bangla	18 March 2025	Best Debut Director	Soojit Rino Dutta	Nominated	
8th Filmfare Awards Bangla	18 March 2025	Best Actor	Dev	Nominated	
8th Filmfare Awards Bangla	18 March 2025	Best Supporting Actor - Male	Jisshu Sengupta	Nominated	
8th Filmfare Awards Bangla	18 March 2025	Best Female Debut	Idhika Paul	Won	
8th Filmfare Awards Bangla	18 March 2025	Best Music Album	Rathijit Bhattacharjee, Nilayan Chatterjee, Savvy	Nominated	
8th Filmfare Awards Bangla	18 March 2025	Best Playback Singer - Male	Rathijit Bhattacharjee – (for "Kishori")	Nominated	
8th Filmfare Awards Bangla	18 March 2025	Best Playback Singer - Female	Antara Mitra – (for "Kishori")	Nominated	
8th Filmfare Awards Bangla	18 March 2025	Best Production Design	Bablu Singha	Nominated	
8th Filmfare Awards Bangla	18 March 2025	Best Background Score	Rathijit Bhattacharjee	Nominated	
8th Filmfare Awards Bangla	18 March 2025	Best Sound Design	Anindit Roy, Adeep Singh Manki	Nominated	
8th WBFJA Awards	12 January 2025	Best Actor in a Negative Role	Jisshu Sengupta	Nominated	
8th WBFJA Awards	12 January 2025	Best Background Score	Rathijit Bhattacharjee	Won	
8th WBFJA Awards	12 January 2025	Best Cinematography	Shailesh Awashthi	Won	
8th WBFJA Awards	12 January 2025	Best Editor	MD. Kalam	Nominated	
8th WBFJA Awards	12 January 2025	Best Make-Up	Somnath Kundu	Nominated	
8th WBFJA Awards	12 January 2025	Best Music Director	Rathijit Bhattacharjee, Nilayan Chatterjee, Savvy	Nominated	
8th WBFJA Awards	12 January 2025	Best Playback Singer (Male)	Rathijit Bhattacharya – (for "Kishori")	Won	
8th WBFJA Awards	12 January 2025	Best Playback Singer (Female)	Antara Mitra – (for "Kishori")	Won	
8th WBFJA Awards	12 January 2025	Best Playback Singer (Female)	Sohini Das – (for "Phiraiyya Dao")	Nominated	
8th WBFJA Awards	12 January 2025	Best Sound Designer	Anindit Roy, Adeep Singh Manki	Nominated	
8th WBFJA Awards	12 January 2025	Most Popular Film	Khadaan	Won	
8th WBFJA Awards	12 January 2025	Most Popular Actor	Dev	Won	
8th WBFJA Awards	12 January 2025	Most Promising Director	Soojit Rino Dutta	Nominated	
22nd Tele Cine Awards	26 March 2025	Best Film	Khadaan	Won	
22nd Tele Cine Awards	26 March 2025	Best Actor	Dev	Nominated	
22nd Tele Cine Awards	26 March 2025	Best Actor in a Supporting Role (Male)	Jisshu Sengupta	Nominated	
22nd Tele Cine Awards	26 March 2025	Best Debutant Actress	Idhika Paul	Won	
22nd Tele Cine Awards	26 March 2025	Best Promising Actor (Male)	John Bhattacharya	Won	
22nd Tele Cine Awards	26 March 2025	Best Choreographer	Debraj Ghosal – (for "Baap Eseche")	Won	
22nd Tele Cine Awards	26 March 2025	Best Lyricist	Ritam Sen – (for "Kishori")	Won	
22nd Tele Cine Awards	26 March 2025	Best Music Director	Rathijit Bhattacharjee – (for "Kishori")	Won	
22nd Tele Cine Awards	26 March 2025	Best Cinematography	Shailesh Awashthi	Nominated	

== See also ==
- List of Bengali films of 2024
- List of highest-grossing Indian Bengali films
