= West Bengal Film Journalists' Association Award for Most Popular Actor =

Annual Indian film award

WBFJA for Most Popular Actor
- Awarded for: Most popular actor of the year
- Country: India
- Presented by: West Bengal Film Journalists' Association
- Final award: 2026
- Most Recent Winner: Anirban Chakrabarti for The Eken: Benaras e Bibhishika

The West Bengal Film Journalists' Association Award for Most Popular Actor is presented by WBFJA as a part of its annual West Bengal Film Journalists' Association Awards for Bengali films, to recognize the most popular actor in a film released in the previous year.

== Superlatives ==
Multiple wins
Awards	Actor
5	Dev
2	Prosenjit Chatterjee

== Winners and Nominees ==
Year (Note: Refers to the year in which the ceremony was held.)	Photos of winners	Actor	Role(s)	Film
2017 (1st)		Dev ‡	Markaz Ali	Zulfiqar
2017 (1st)		Abir Chatterjee	Byomkesh Bakshi	Byomkesh Pawrbo
2017 (1st)		Jeet	Aditya Dev Burman	Abhimaan
2017 (1st)		Rituparna Sengupta	Sudipa Sen	Praktan
2017 (1st)		Sabyasachi Chakraborty	Prodosh Chandra Mitra	Double Feluda
2017 (1st)		Saswata Chatterjee	Shabor Dasgupta	Eagoler Chokh
2017 (1st)		Yash Dasgupta	Kabir / Guru	Gangster
2018 (2nd)		Dev ‡	Shivaji Sanyal	Chaamp
2018 (2nd)		Jeet	Surya	Boss 2
2018 (2nd)		Jisshu Sengupta	Byomkesh Bakshi	Byomkesh O Agnibaan
2018 (2nd)		Prosenjit Chatterjee	Kakababu	Yeti Obhijaan
2019 (4th)		Abir Chatterjee ‡	Byomkesh Bakshi	Byomkesh Gotro
2019 (4th)		Prosenjit Chatterjee ‡	Rajat Ghosh	Kishore Kumar Junior
2019 (4th)		Ankush Hazra	Raja / Joy	Villain
2019 (4th)		Dev	Altaf Kabir Kapoor	Kabir
2020 (4th)		Prosenjit Chatterjee ‡	Subhas Chandra Bose / Gumnami Baba	Gumnaami
2020 (4th)		Abir Chatterjee	Subarna Sen	Durgeshgorer Guptodhon
2020 (4th)		Anirban Bhattacharya	Nikhilesh	Ghawre Bairey Aaj
2020 (4th)		Dev	Chandan Chatterjee	Sanjhbati
2020 (4th)		Koel Mallick	Mitin Masi	Mitin Mashi
2020 (4th)		Rituparna Sengupta	Basundhara	Ahaa Re
2021–2022 (5th)	–	Anirban Bhattacharya	Khokaa / Paltan	Dwitiyo Purush
2021–2022 (5th)	–	Dev ‡	Tonic	Tonic
2021–2022 (5th)	–	Ankush Hazra	Indra	Magic
2021–2022 (5th)	–	Dev	Nagendra Prasad Sarbadhikari	Golondaaj
2021–2022 (5th)	–	Koel Mallick	RJ Swarnaja	Rawkto Rawhoshyo
2021–2022 (5th)	–	Mimi Chakraborty	Manjari	Dracula Sir
2023 (6th)		Mithun Chakraborty ‡	Gaur Chakraborty	Projapoti
2023 (6th)		Abir Chatterjee	Subarna Sen	Karnasubarner Guptodhon
2023 (6th)		Dev	Tintin Chatterjee	Kishmish
2023 (6th)		Jeet	Professor Ram Mukherjee / Raavan	Raavan
2023 (6th)		Prosenjit Chatterjee	Kakababu	Kakababur Protyaborton
2024 (7th)		Dev ‡	Deepak Pradhan	Pradhan
2024 (7th)		Anirban Chakrabarty	Ekenbabu	The Eken: Ruddhaswas Rajasthan
2024 (7th)		Mimi Chakraborty	Sanjukta Mitra	Raktabeej
2024 (7th)		Mithun Chakraborty	Rehmat Khan	Kabuliwala
2024 (7th)		Prosenjit Chatterjee	Prabir Roy Chaudhury	Dawshom Awbotaar
2025 (8th)		Dev ‡	Shyam Mahato / Madhu Mahato	Khadaan
2025 (8th)		Ankush Hazra	Mirza	Mirza: Part 1 - Joker
2025 (8th)		Jeet	Samar Sen/Amar	Boomerang
2025 (8th)		Prosenjit Chatterjee	Prosen Mitra	Ajogyo
2025 (8th)		Vikram Chatterjee	Lubdhak Chatterjee	Pariah
2026 (9th)	–	Anirban Chakrabarti ‡	Ekendra Sen aka Eken Babu	The Eken: Benaras e Bibhishika
2026 (9th)	–	Dev	Bhanu Singha / Indranath Khasnobis	Dhumketu

== See also ==
- West Bengal Film Journalists' Association Awards
- Cinema of West Bengal
