= Bike Ambulance Dada =

Upcoming Indian Bengali-language biographical drama film

- Theatrical release poster
- Directed by: Vinay Mudgil
- Written by: Rohit Dey; Soumya Nandy
- Based on: Karimul Haque
- Produced by: Dev; Pradip Kumar Nandy
- Starring: Dev; Rukmini Maitra; Resad Ajim; Parthasarathi Chakraborty
- Production companies: Dev Entertainment Ventures; Nandi Movies
- Release date: 24 December 2026
- Country: India
- Language: Bengali

Bike Ambulance Dada is an 2026 upcoming Indian Bengali-language biographical drama film directed by Vinay Mudgil. The film is based on the life and humanitarian work of Karimul Haque, a social worker from North Bengal who became widely known for transporting critically ill patients to hospitals using a motorcycle ambulance.

The film stars Dev in the title role and is produced by Dev Entertainment Ventures in association with Nandi Movies.

== Premise ==
The film chronicles the life of Karimul Haque, popularly known as "Bike Ambulance Dada", who dedicated his life to helping people in remote villages of North Bengal reach hospitals during medical emergencies. Haque began this mission after losing his mother in 1995 due to the unavailability of an ambulance. He later converted his motorcycle into an emergency transport vehicle and spent decades transporting patients free of cost.

Karimul Haque received the Padma Shri in 2017 for his contribution to social service and rural healthcare support.

== Cast ==
- Dev as Karimul Haque
- Rukmini Maitra as Anju
- Resad Ajim
- Parthasarathi Chakraborty

== Production ==
The film was announced on 25 December 2025 by Dev Entertainment Ventures. The first-look poster was released on the occasion of actor Dev's birthday and introduced the project as a biographical film inspired by the life of Padma Shri awardee Karimul Haque. The announcement described the film as the 50th feature film in Dev's acting career. The first promotional poster featured the title logo and highlighted the inspirational nature of Karimul Haque's story.

On International Women's Day in March 2026, the producers unveiled a second official poster introducing actress Rukmini Maitra as Anju, the wife of Karimul Haque. The poster depicted the couple together and emphasized the role played by Anju in Haque's life journey.

The film is based on the real-life story of Karimul Haque, a resident of the Dooars region of West Bengal. Haque gained national attention for providing emergency transportation services to villagers living in remote areas where conventional ambulances were unavailable. His work has been widely recognized by media organizations and public institutions.

== Release ==
Bike Ambulance Dada is scheduled for theatrical release on 24 December 2026. Media reports have described the film as one of the major Bengali-language releases of 2026 and a landmark project in Dev's filmography.
