= 8th WBFJA Awards =

2025 Indian film awards

2024-2025 WBFJA Awards
- Awarded for: Excellence in Indian Bengali cinema
- Announced on: Nominations: 3 January 2025
- Presented on: 12 January 2025
- Date: 12 January 2025
- Site: Priya Cinema Hall, Kolkata
- Organised by: West Bengal Film Journalists’ Association (WBFJA)
- Official website: WBFJA

Highlights
- Best Film: Manikbabur Megh
- Best Direction: Debaloy Bhattacharya; Srijit Mukherji
- Best Actor: Chandan Sen
- Best Actress: Rituparna Sengupta

The 8th West Bengal Film Journalists' Association Awards (WBFJA) also known as Cinemar Somabarton (transl. Convocation of Cinema) is an annual award ceremony which honoured the best Bengali-language films of 2024.

== Nominations ==
Shri Swapankumarer Badami Hyenar Kobole led the ceremony with 14 nominations, followed by Khadaan with 13 and Ajogyo with 12 nominations.

Dev received dual nominations under Best Actor and Most Popular Actor categories, for two different films – Tekka and Khadaan, winning for the latter.

== Background ==
The nominations for the ceremony were announced on 3 January 2025 at a Press conference held at Rotary Sadan, Kolkata and subsequently live streamed via Facebook from the official page of the organization. Actors Tota Roy Chowdhury and Rituparna Sengupta were present at the conference. The ceremony was to take place at the Ajanta Circus in order to commemorate the 100th Birth Anniversary of noted Indian actor Raj Kapoor. However, owing to security concerns, the venue was later changed to Priya Cinema.

== Winners & Nominees ==
=== Main awards ===
The nominations were announced on 3 January 2025.

Best Film	Best Director
Manikbabur Megh – Little Lamb Films; Beline – DrishtiShree Arts Pvt. Limited; Chaalchitra Ekhon – Hoichoi Studios; Padatik – Friends Communication; Shri Swapankumarer Badami Hyenar Kobole – Hoichoi Studios	Debaloy Bhattacharya – Shri Swapankumarer Badami Hyenar Kobole; Srijit Mukherji – Padatik; Anjan Dutt – Chaalchitra Ekhon; Pratim D Gupta – Chaalchitro: The Frame Fatale
Best Actor	Best Actress
Chandan Sen – Manikbabur Megh as Manik Babu; Abir Chatterjee – Shri Swapankumarer Badami Hyenar Kobole as Dipak Chatterjee; Anjan Dutt – Chaalchitra Ekhon as Kunal Sen; Dev – Tekka as Iqlakh Alam; Tota Roy Chowdhury – Chaalchitro: The Frame Fatale as Kanishka Chatterjee	Rituparna Sengupta – Ajogyo as Parna Majumdar; Koushani Mukherjee – Bohurupi as Jhimli Pramanik; Mamata Shankar – Bijoyar Pore as Alokananda "Aloka"; Mimi Chakraborty – Alaap as Aditi Mitra; Rukmini Maitra – Boomerang as Ishaa Sen/Nisha
Best Supporting Actor	Best Supporting Actress
Silajit Majumdar – Ajogyo as Raktim Majumdar; Anirban Chakrabarty – Chaalchitro: The Frame Fatale as Naseer; Indraneil Sengupta – Hubba as Dibakar Sen; Paran Bandopadhyay – Shri Swapankumarer Badami Hyenar Kobole as Swapan Kumar; Ritwick Chakraborty – Shontaan as Indranil "Bablu" Bose	Swastika Dutta – Alaap as Swatilekha Sen; Sanjita Mukherjee – Doaansh as Sarathi Sardar
Best Actor in a Negative Role	Best Actor in a Comic Role
Anirban Bhattacharya – Athhoi as Anagra "Gogo" Chatterjee; Dibyendu Bhattacharya – Bonbibi as Dakshin Ray; Jisshu Sengupta – Khadaan as Mohan Das; Loknath Dey – Hubba as Baapi; Soumya Mukherjee – Pariah: Volume – I as Nanda	Saswata Chatterjee – Jamalaye Jibonto Bhanu as Bhanu Bandopadhyay; Sourav Das – Boomerang as Ayan
Best Music Director	Best Lyricist
Amit Chatterjee – Shri Swapankumarer Badami Hyenar Kobole; Amit Chatterjee – Athhoi; Anupam Roy, Indraadip Dasgupta & Ranajoy Bhattacharjee – Ajogyo; Anupam Roy, Bonnie Chakraborty, Arnab Dutta & Nani Chora Das Baul – Bohurupi; Nilayan Chatterjee, Rathijit Bhattacharya & Savvy Gupta – Khadaan	Kaushik Ganguly – "Keu Jaanbe Naa" – Ajogyo; Anupam Roy – "Ajogyo Ami" – Ajogyo; Barish – "Taasher Deshe" – Tekka; Dhrubojyoti Chakraborty – "Mon Kharaper Gaan" – Oti Uttam; Ranajoy Bhattacharjee – "Tomay Chhere Jete" – Tekka
Best Male Playback Singer	Best Female Playback Singer
Rathijit Bhattacharya – "Kishori" – Khadaan; Timir Biswas – "Taasher Deshe" – Tekka; Anupam Roy – "Ajogyo Ami" – Ajogyo; Arijit Singh – "Keu Jaanbe Naa" – Ajogyo; Rupankar Bagchi – "Mon Kharaper Gaan" – Oti Uttam	Antara Mitra – "Kishori" – Khadaan; Monali Thakur – "Saaiyaan Beimaan" – Oti Uttam; Shreya Ghoshal – "Tui Aamar Hobi Naa" – Ajogyo; Shreya Ghoshal – "Elomelo Raat" – Babli; Sohini Saha – "Phiraiya Dao" – Khadaan

=== Popular Awards ===
Most Popular Film	Most Popular Actor
Khadaan – Surinder Films & Dev Entertainment Ventures; Ajogyo – Surinder Films; Alaap – Surinder Films; Bohurupi – Windows Production; Boomerang – Jeetz Filmworks & Grassroot Entertainment; Eta Amader Golpo – Dhagaa Production	Dev – Khadaan as Shyam Mahato / Madhu Mahato; Ankush Hazra – Mirza: Part 1 – Joker as Mirza; Jeet – Boomerang as Samar Sen / Amar; Prosenjit Chatterjee – Ajogyo as Prosen Mitra; Vikram Chatterjee – Pariah: Volume – I as Lubdhak Chatterjee

=== Special awards ===
Lifetime Achievement Award
- Aparna Sen

=== Other awards ===
Most Promising Director
- Abhinandan Banerjee – Manikbabur Megh
  - Arna Mukhopadhyay – Athhoi
  - Rajdeep Paul & Sarmistha Maiti – Mon Potongo
  - Samik Roy Choudhury – Beline
  - Soojit Dutta – Khadaan
Most Promising Actor (Male)
- Sawon Chakraborty – Chaalchitra Ekhon
  - Gambhira Bhattacharya – Hubba
  - Pratik Dutta – Shri Swapankumarer Badami Hyenar Kobole
  - Subhankar Mohanta – Mon Potongo
Most Promising Actor (Female)
- Baishakhi Roy – Mon Potongo
  - Oindrila Sen – Mirza: Part 1 – Joker
  - Roshni Bhattacharyya – Oti Uttam
  - Sreya Bhattacharya – Beline
  - Tanika Basu – Chaalchitro: The Frame Fatale

=== Technical Awards ===
Best Screenplay	Best Editing	Best Art Director	Best Cinematography
Anjan Dutt – Chaalchitra Ekhon	Antara Lahiri – Chaalchitro: The Frame Fatale; Srijit Mukherji – Padatik	Tanmoy Chakraborty – Padatik	Anup Singh – Manikbabur Megh
Best Sound Designer	Best Background Score	Best Costume Designer	Best Makeup
Abhijit Teny Roy – Manikbabur Megh	Rathijit Bhattacharya – Khadaan; Amit Chatterjee – Shri Swapankumarer Badami Hyenar Kobole; Prabuddha Banerjee – Alaap; Subhadeep Guha – Athhoi; Subhajeet Mukherjee – Manikbabur Megh	Sabarni Das – Padatik	Somnath Kundu – Padatik

== Controversy ==
Windows Production, owned by Shiboprosad Mukherjee and Nandita Roy, requested the organisation to revoke the nominations for their film Bohurupi (2024), conveying their wish to abstain from attending the ceremony or accepting any awards.

== Superlatives ==
Multiple nominations
Nominations	Film
14	Shri Swapankumarer Badami Hyenar Kobole
13	Khadaan
12	Ajogyo
8	Chaalchitro: The Frame Fatale
7	Manikbabur Megh, Padatik
6	Athhoi, Chaalchitra Ekhon
