= List of Indian Bengali films of 2024 =

This is a list of India Bengali cinema films to be released in 2024.

== Box office collection ==
The following is the list of highest-grossing Bengali films (India) released in 2024. The rank of the films in the following table depends on the estimate of worldwide collections as reported by organizations classified as green by Wikipedia. (Note: See WP:RSP, WP:ICTFSOURCES) There is no official tracking of domestic box office figures within India.

Background shading indicates that a film is currently showing in theatres worldwide.

Highest grossing Bengali cinema films of 2024
Rank (Note: Sorted based on the lowest value when figures are presented as a range, and for the same value, the older item is given a higher order.)	Title	Production company	Distributor	Worldwide gross	Ref.
1	Khadaan	Dev Entertainment Ventures; Surinder Films		₹26 crore	
2	Bohurupi	Windows Production		₹21.24 crore	(Note: In India, including West Bengal, the net income is calculated by subtracting GST from the gross income of the film. The net income of the film is 18 crores, resulting in a gross income of almost 21.24 crores, including 18% GST.)
3	Tekka	Dev Entertainment Ventures	PVR Inox Pictures	₹6.1 crore	
4	Ajogyo	Surinder Films		₹3.2 crore	
5	Eta Amader Golpo	Dhagaa Production	SSR Cinemas	₹2.1 crore	
6	Oti Uttam	Camellia Productions	PVR Inox Pictures	₹1.56 crore	

== January–March ==
Opening		Title	Director	Cast	Production Company	Ref.
J A N	12	Shri Swapankumarer Badami Hyenar Kobole	Debaloy Bhattacharya	Abir Chatterjee, Paran Bandopadhyay, Goutam Halder	Hoichoi Studios	
J A N	12	Bijoyar Pore	Abhijit SriDas	Swastika Mukherjee, Mamata Shankar, Mir Afsar Ali	SR Jupiter Motion Pictures	
J A N	12	Sesh Rokkha	Sudeshna Roy, Abhijit Guha	Indraneil Sengupta, Parno Mittra, Susmita Chatterjee	ZEE5	
J A N	19	Hubba	Bratya Basu	Mosharraf Karim, Debasish Mondal, Indraneil Sengupta	Friends Communication	
J A N	19	Sentimentaaal	Baba Yadav	Yash Dasgupta, Nusrat Jahan, Sayantani Ghosh	YD Films	
F E B	9	Palasher Biye	Premendu Bikash Chaki	Mimi Chakraborty, Somraj Maity	Roadshow Films, Shadow Films, ZEE5	
F E B	9	Pariah	Tathagata Mukherjee	Vikram Chatterjee, Angana Roy, Sreelekha Mitra, Soumya Mukhopadhyay, Ambarish Bhattacharya	Pramod Films	
F E B	9	Bhootpori	Soukarya Ghosal	Jaya Ahsan, Ritwick Chakraborty, Sudipta Chakraborty	Surinder Films	
F E B	9	Sedin Kuyasha Chilo	Arnab Midda	Jeetu Kamal, Paran Bandopadhyay, Lily Chakraborty, Sauraseni Maitra, Debshankar Haldar, Kharaj Mukherjee	Sandarc Media	
F E B	23	Sada Ronger Prithibi	Raajhorshee De	Srabanti Chatterjee, Sauraseni Maitra, Arindam Sil	Michel Angel Studio; Adarsh Telemedia	
F E B	23	Ahalya	Abhimanyu Mukherjee	Bonny Sengupta, Payel Sarkar	APP Production	
M A R	1	Daroga Mamur Kirti	Nehal Dutta	Ranjit Mallick, Kharaj Mukherjee, Laboni Sarkar	Shree Jagannath Films Entertainment	
M A R	8	Bonbibi	Rajdeep Ghosh	Parno Mittra, Dibyendu Bhattacharya	Dag Creative Media	
M A R	15	Tilottama	Soumojit Adak & team	Neel Bhattacharya, Trina Saha, Paran Bandopadhyay	Anjana Films	
M A R	22	Oti Uttam	Srijit Mukherji	Anindya Sengupta, Roshni Bhattacharya, Gourab Chatterjee	Camellia Productions	
M A R	22	Lukochuri	Shieladitya Moulik	Angana Roy, Rajdeep Deb	Nalini Lakshmi Creations, The Big Day	
M A R	29	Beline	Samik Roy Choudhury	Paran Bandopadhyay, Sreya Bhattacharya	Drishtishree Arts Pvt. Ltd.	

== April–June ==
Opening		Title	Director	Cast	Production Company	Ref.
A P R	11	Mirza: Part 1 - Joker	Sumeet-Saahil	Ankush Hazra, Oindrila Sen, Kaushik Ganguly, Rishi Kaushik	Ankush Hazra Motion Pictures	
A P R	26	Alaap	Premendu Bikash Chaki	Abir Chatterjee, Mimi Chakraborty, Swastika Dutta, Kinjal Nanda	Surinder Films	
A P R	26	Eta Amader Golpo	Manasi Sinha	Saswata Chatterjee, Aparajita Auddy	Dhagaa Production	
M A Y	10	Dabaru	Pathikrit Basu	Chiranjeet Chakraborty, Rituparna Sengupta, Dipankar De	Windows Production	
M A Y	10	Nayan Rahasya	Sandip Ray	Indraneil Sengupta, Abhijit Guha, Ayush Das	Surinder Films	
M A Y	10	Chaalchitra Ekhon	Anjan Dutt	Anjan Dutt, Sawon Chakraborty	Anjan Dutt, Neel Dutt	
M A Y	24	Tahader Katha	Subrata Bose	Rishav Basu, Rajnandini Paul	Epic Tale Entertainment	
J U N	7	Boomerang	Sauvik Kundu	Jeet, Rukmini Maitra	Jeetz Flimworks	
J U N	7	Ajogyo	Kaushik Ganguly	Prosenjit Chatterjee, Rituparna Sengupta	Surinder Films	
J U N	14	Athhoi	Arna Mukhopadhyay	Arna Mukhopadhyay, Sohini Sarkar, Anirban Bhattacharya	SVF, Jio Studios	
J U N	28	Alexandarer Pisi	Debojyoti Sarkar	Aparajita Auddy, Biswanath Basu	Aditya Production	

== July–September ==
Opening		Title	Director	Cast	Production Company	Ref.
J U L	5	Aranyar Prachin Prabad	Dulal Dey	Jeetu Kamal, Silajit Majumder	JSM Entertainment	
J U L	12	Manikbabur Megh	Abhinandan Banerjee	Chandan Sen	Little Lamb Films	
J U L	19	Surjo	Shieladitya Moulik	Vikram Chatterjee, Madhumita Sarcar, Darshana Banik	Innovative Films	
J U L	19	Robin's Kitchen	Bappa	Bonny Sengupta, Priyanka Sarkar	Pandey Motion Pictures	
A U G	2	Kaliachak Chapter 1	Ratool Mukherjee	Asim Aktar, Rupanjana Mitra	Sahi Bangla Films	
A U G	15	Padatik	Srijit Mukherji	Chanchal Chowdhury, Monami Ghosh, Korak Samanta	Friends Communication, Big Screen Productions House	
A U G	15	Babli	Raj Chakraborty	Subhashree Ganguly, Abir Chatterjee, Sauraseni Maitra	Raj Chakraborty Entertainment	
A U G	20	Bharga	Shuvam Roy	Saurav Das, Prantika Das, Kharaj Mukherjee, Loknath Dey, Surjo Majumder, Gargi Sengupta	Akash Anjali Production	

== October–December ==
Opening		Title	Director	Cast	Production Company	Ref.
O C T	8	Tekka	Srijit Mukherji	Dev, Swastika Mukherjee, Rukmini Maitra, Paran Bandopadhyay, Tota Roy Chowdhury	Dev Entertainment Ventures	
O C T	8	Shastri	Pathikrit Basu	Mithun Chakraborty, Debashree Roy, Sauraseni Maitra, Soham Chakraborty	Soham's Entertainment, Surinder Films	
O C T	8	Bohurupi	Shiboprosad Mukherjee, Nandita Roy	Abir Chatterjee, Ritabhari Chakraborty, Koushani Mukherjee, Shiboprosad Mukherjee	Windows Production	
N O V	15	Jamalaye Jibonto Bhanu	Dr.Krishnendu Chatterjee	Saswata Chatterjee, Ambarish Bhattacharya	Burima Chitram	
N O V	15	Kohinoor	Sourav Das	Sourav Das, Rajatava Dutta, Soumi Datta Roy	SDR	
D E C	13	Mon Patongo	Rajdeep Paul and Sharmistha Maiti	Subhankar Mohanta, Baishakhi Roy, Joy Sengupta, Tannistha Biswas, Janardan Ghosh	Aurora Film Corporation	
D E C	20	Khadaan	Soojit Rino Dutta	Dev, Jisshu Sengupta, Idhika Paul, Barkha Bisht Sengupta	Surinder Films, Dev Entertainment Ventures	
D E C	20	Shontaan	Raj Chakraborty	Mithun Chakraborty, Ritwick Chakraborty, Subhashree Ganguly	SVF	
D E C	20	Chaalchitro	Pratim D. Gupta	Tota Roy Chowdhury, Ziaul Faruq Apurba, Raima Sen, Shantanu Maheshwari, Swastika Dutta, Debesh Chattopadhyay, Anirban Chakrabarti, Tanika Basu, Priya Banerjee, Indrajeet Bose, Bratya Basu	Friends Communication	
D E C	20	5 No. Swapnomoy Lane	Manasi Sinha	Aparajita Auddy, Kharaj Mukherjee, Chandan Sen, Arjun Chakrabarty	Dhagaa Production	

== See also ==
- List of Indian Bengali films of 2023
- List of Indian Bengali films of 2025
