= Le Chakka =

2010 Indian Bengali film

- Theatrical poster
- Directed by: Raj Chakraborty
- Written by: Padmanabha Dasgupta; Abhimanyu Mukherjee
- Produced by: Shyam Agarwal
- Starring: Dev; Payel Sarkar; Ritwick Chakraborty; Kharaj Mukherjee; Laboni Sarkar; Debjani Chattopadhyay; Biswanath Basu; Dipankar De; Biswajit Chakraborty; Raja Dutta
- Cinematography: Somak Mukherjee
- Edited by: Rabi Ranjan Maitra
- Music by: Indraadip Das Gupta
- Production company: Srijon Arts
- Distributed by: Eskay Movies
- Release date: 10 June 2010
- Running time: 134:05 minutes
- Country: India
- Language: Bengali

Le Chakka (English: Take a Sixer) is a 2010 Indian Bengali-language sports comedy drama film co-written and directed by Raj Chakraborty. Produced by Shyam Aggarwal under the banner of Srijan Arts, the screenplay and dialogues of the film were by Padmanabha Dasgupta and Abhimanyu Mukherjee. It stars Dev, Payel Sarkar and Ritwick Chakraborty in lead roles, while Kharaj Mukherjee, Biswajit Chakraborty, Dipankar De, Supriyo Dutta, Laboni Sarkar, Biswanath Basu, Parthasarathi Chakraborty, Pradip Dhar, Prasun Gain and Anindya Banerjee play pivotal roles. The soundtrack and background score was composed by Indraadip Das Gupta.

Le Chakka marks the second collaboration between Dev and Raj Chakraborty after Challenge (2009). The film received positive reviews from the audiences, while critics were appraisal of the portrayal of the famous 'Rock culture' in North Kolkata; differences between North and South Kolkata; 'Khep Khela', a popular term of cricket taken places in North Kolkata.

== Plot ==
11 Bullets is a very bad cricket team of North Kolkata. The team is formed by the people of the locality, who have various professions. The film starts with a match between 11 Bullets and a cricket team of South Kolkata. The hero, named Abir, alone smashes 11 Bullets. The team members of 11 Bullets are then abused by the people of their locality. In the meantime, Abir comes with his family to stay at Dorjipara, which is the locality of 11 Bullets. But, due to huge cultural difference between North Kolkata and South Kolkata, Abir becomes irritated to stay over there. The niece of the landlord of Abir's tenant house, starts having regular quarrels with Abir. Then, Abir discovers that a political leader is trying to grab Dorjipara, and for that, the leader wants the tenant house, which the landlord does not want to sell. When Abir teaches the 11 Bullets people, that without protesting against these political evils, they will not be able to survive, slowly, those people come close to Abir, and vice versa. Then slowly, Abir gets intimate with Rani, which her brother Rajat does not like. A person, Shankar, who is attached to that leader comes and gets involved with the unmarried, frustrated, elder sister of Rani, named Ratna. But, when Shankar says that he wants to marry Rani, not Ratna. Ratna kills herself. Ultimately, when the party leaders come to take control over Dorjipara, Abir throws a challenge of a cricket match, which is going to decide who's going to get control over the house. 11 Bullets have a tensed and marvelous win, and Abir has a romantic win over Rani.

== Cast ==
- Dev as Abir Basu
- Payel Sarkar as Rani
- Kharaj Mukherjee as Ismail Biriyaniola
- Biswanath Basu as Gour
- Biswajit Chakraborty as Abir's father
- Laboni Sarkar as Abir's mother
- Deepankar De as Maniranjan Mitra, Rani's uncle
- Debjani Chattopadhyay as Ratna, Rani's elder sister
- Supriyo Dutta as Rani's father
- Ritwick Chakraborty as Rajat, Rani's brother
- Abhimanyu Mukherjee as commentator
- Aritra Dutta Banik as Futkarai Pocha
- Sanghasri Sinha as Chilim
- Prasun Gain as Tarun
- Parthasarathi Chattopadhyay as Kanu
- Raju Majumdar as Raju
- Vashcar Deb as Abir's friend
- Debranjan Nag as Abir's friend
- Arindam Dutta as Shankar
- Anindya Pulak Banerjee
- Raju Dutta
- Tapan Chattopadhyay
- Padmanabha Dasgupta
- Rupak Dey

== Soundtrack ==
Le Chakka

Soundtrack album by Indraadip Das Gupta
- Released: 14 May 2010
- Recorded: 2010
- Genre: Feature film soundtrack
- Label: Eskay Movies

The film score of the film as well as the soundtrack was scored by Indraadip Das Gupta. The soundtrack, featuring 5 tracks overall, was released on 14 May 2010 in India. The lyrics were written by Priyo Chattopadhyay, Prosen and Srijato.

Track	Song	Singer(s)	Duration (min:sec)	Lyricist	Notes
1	"You And Me"	Shaan, June Banerjee	4:56	Priyo Chattopadhyay, Prasenjit Mukherjee and Srijato	
2	"Shabba Rabba Reeba Ru"	Kunal Ganjawalla, Monali Thakur	5:00	Priyo Chattopadhyay, Prasenjit Mukherjee and Srijato	
3	"Ali Maula"	Shreya Ghoshal, Shaan, Shahadab Hussain	6:04	Priyo Chattopadhyay	
4	"Ekta Bindaas Para"	Kunal Ganjawalla, Shahdab Hussain, Prasenjit Mukherjee	4:38	Priyo Chattopadhyay, Prasenjit Mukherjee and Srijato	
5	"Le Chakka"	Kunal Ganjawalla, Prasenjit Mukherjee	4:24	Priyo Chattopadhyay, Prasenjit Mukherjee and Srijato	
