= Karimul Haque =

Indian tea garden worker

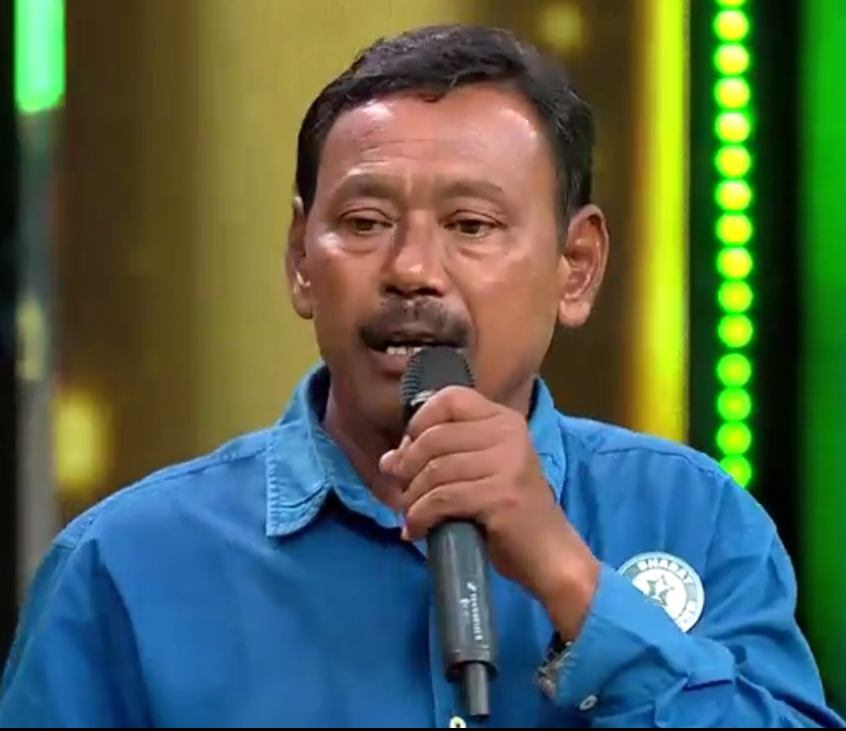
- Born: Karimul Haque; West Bengal, India
- Occupation: Social service
- Years active: From 1998
- Spouse: Anjuya Begum
- Awards: Padma Shri (2017)

Karimul Haque is a worker in the tea gardens of West Bengal. Locally known as Bike-Ambulance-dada, he has received the Padma Shri award for his work supporting the villagers in and around Dhalabari by bringing sick people to hospital in his motorcycle ambulance.

== Inspiration ==
In 1995 Haque had gone door to door seeking help for his ailing mother who was in desperate need of medical treatment, but he was not able to find an ambulance to take her to the hospital. Consequently, his mother died at home due to a heart attack. Following this, he took a vow to not let anyone else die due to insufficient ambulance coverage.

Haque's motorbike ambulance plan came to him when one of his colleagues collapsed on the field. Since a regular ambulance could not reach him in time, Haque tied him to his back and made him ride pillion to the nearest hospital. His co-worker recovered from the illness, inspiring Haque to continue with this approach.

== Life ==
Since 1998 Haque has been providing ambulance coverage to over 20 villages in and around Dhalabari in the Dooars belt where basic amenities such as roads and electricity are not present, and the nearest hospital is 45 kilometres (28 mi) away. As of 2019, he had ferried approximately 5,000 to 5,500 people free of cost.

Besides the ambulance service he also provides basic first aid with training from local doctors to villagers. He also holds periodic health camps in tribal regions.

Haque is a resident of Rajadanga in Malbazar. He lives with his wife Anjuya Begum, his two sons Rajesh and Raju and their wives. His sons' betel leaf shop and cellphone repair shop in Rajadanga support the family. Most of Haque's income goes into buying fuel and medicines.

He appeared in Kaun Banega Crorepati with actor Sonu Sood on 1 January 2021.

Karimul Haque's life has been chronicled in a book called 'Bike Ambulance Dada'. The book was published by Penguin Random House India, in January 2021, and written by journalist turned social entrepreneur Biswajit Jha.
