= Challenge 2 =

2012 Indian Bengali film by Raja Chanda

- Theatrical release poster
- Directed by: Raja Chanda
- Screenplay by: N. K. Salil
- Dialogues by: N. K. Salil
- Story by: Srinu Vaitla
- Produced by: Shrikant Mohta
- Starring: Dev; Puja Banerjee; Tapas Paul; Ashish Vidyarthi; Rajatava Dutta; Kharaj Mukherjee
- Cinematography: Shailesh Awasthhi
- Edited by: Rabi Ranjan Maitra; Saikat Sengupta; Jahidul Islam Shuvo
- Music by: Songs: Jeet Gannguli; Savvy; Background score: Jeet Gannguli; S. P. Venkatesh
- Production company: Shree Venkatesh Films
- Distributed by: Shree Venkatesh Films
- Release date: 19 October 2012
- Running time: 161:38 minutes
- Country: India
- Language: Bengali

Challenge 2 is a 2012 Indian Bengali-language film directed by Raja Chanda. Produced by Shrikant Mohta under the banner of Shree Venkatesh Films, the film is remake of 2011 Telugu movie Dookudu. It stars Dev, Puja Banerjee, Tapas Paul, Ashish Vidyarthi and in lead roles, alongside, Rajatava Dutta, Kharaj Mukherjee, Subhasish Mukherjee and Kaushik Chakraborty in another pivotal roles, with Biswanath Basu and Labani Sarkar in guest appearances. The film is a spiritual sequel to the 2009 film Challenge, but contains a very different storyline. It revolves around an undercover officer as well as IPS Abhiraj Roy, who is on a mission to bring down the dreaded don Guru Nayak. But all on a sudden tragically he transforms into an MLA to fulfill his father's wish, who was in coma after meeting an conspiring accident as he was an honest and celebrated politician amongst the masses.

The film began production in December 2011 in Kolkata. Shooting began on 16 February 2012 in Kolkata and lasted in Turkey till mid-August 2012. The film was predominantly shot in Kolkata, with portions shot in Mumbai, Dubai, Singapore, Malaysia and Switzerland. The soundtrack of the film was composed by Jeet Gannguli and Savvy (making his debut as a composer), while the background score was by S. P. Venkatesh. Rabi Ranjan Maitra edited the film, while Shailesh Awasthhi handled the cinematography.

On the auspicious occasion of Durga Puja, Challenge 2 was released on 19 October 2012 on 1500 screens worldwide. Upon release, it received positive reviews and was superhit at the box-office. It was cited as "During this Devipokkho this film is a good option to fill-up the spare time you’ll get in between pandal-hopping" by The Times of India. It was the second highest grossing Bengali film of 2012, after Jeet starrer Awara (2012).

== Plot ==
Debraj Roy is an independent MLA of the constituency of Debnagar, which is named after him, in West Bengal, and is regarded as a champion for the poor and one who has idealistic values. When a truck collides with the car his brother Angshuman Roy and he are in, Debraj goes into a coma. Except for his family, everyone else presumes that he was killed in the accident. Years later, his son Abhiraj "Abhi" Roy is a police officer in Mumbai who fights against the mafia and is on a mission to apprehend a mafia don Guru Nayak who is involved in illegal drug trade, extortion and arms trafficking.

When he heads to Kuala Lumpur in an undercover operation, he meets Pooja, the daughter of Abhi's senior police officer, Madhusudan Bakshi and soon falls in love with her. She initially rejects his advances which makes him give up. However, he is successful in the undercover operation and arrests Nayak's brother Bunty. After returning to India, he again meets Pooja and, to his surprise, she reciprocates his feelings. In an attempt to arrest Nayak, Bunty and the police commissioner is killed and Debraj's loyal follower Shivu reveals to Abhi that Nayak, along with Debraj's rival, Apurba Ghosh, and Debraj's other followers including Jagganath and Krishnakanto Mitro were behind Debraj's accident, which makes Abhi plot to kill them all.

When Debraj comes out of the coma, the doctors who treated him advise his family that his life is at risk if he encounters or hears anything upsetting, disturbing or shocking. Abhi hides the events surrounding the accident and shifts his family to his previously abandoned mansion which is now being used for film-making. Abhi creates a dummy political set-up at this mansion. In the guise of a reality television program, Abhi tricks an aspiring but unsuccessful film actor Swarnakamal by making him believe that the television show is being sponsored by actor Mithun Chakraborty's television show, and that Mithun Chakraborty wants to offer Swarnakamal very high remuneration for his realistic performance in the show. On the other hand, an aspiring actor Premjit and Apurba Ghosh are tricked by Abhi with a real estate business deal to exploit his criminal nexus.

Abhi keeps this drama under wraps from Debraj by making him believe that Abhi is also an MLA revered by people fulfilling his father's wishes. He marries Pooja after gaining her family's consent much to Debraj's delight. Meanwhile, Abhi manages to kill Jogonnath and Apurba without the knowledge of anybody while Debraj believes that they died due to ailments. Nayak reaches Kolkata to kill Abhi and Abhi's drama is exposed before everybody except Debraj. Abhi killed Guru Nayak's gang members and others in an encounter while Nayak is later killed in a Ramlila event. Debraj too learns of Abhi's drama and is happy for the affection his son showed on him.

== Cast ==
- Dev as ACP Abhiraj "Abhi" Roy IPS / MLA A. D. Roy / Ruhidas Paul, a film director
- Puja Banerjee as Puja Bakshy, Abhi's wife
- Tapas Paul as Debraj Roy, Abhi's father and ex-MLA of Debnagar
- Ashish Vidyarthi as Guru Nayak, an underworld Don.
- Rajatava Dutta as DCP Madhushudhan Bakshy, Puja's father and later Abhi's father-in-law
- Kharaj Mukherjee as Kamal "Swarnakamal" Ghosh, an actor / Haridas Paul, Ruhidas's uncle
- Surajit Sen as Bunty Nayak, Guru Nayak's younger brother
- Dipankar De as Apurba Ghosh, a fraud medicine launderer
- Laboni Sarkar as Joyeeta Bakshy, Madhusudan's wife and Puja's mother
- Subhasish Mukherjee as Premjit
- Bharat Kaul as CP Pulak Ghosh
- Joyjit Banerjee as Joydeb Shastri IPS, Abhi's colleague
- Srabanti Malakar as Indrani Roy, Angshu's wife
- Kaushik Chakraborty as Shibu Dutta, Debraj Roy's most trusted companion and follower.
- Debesh Roy Chowdhury as Krishnakanto Mitra aka Kesto Mitra, a state minister, Debraj's party worker
- Sumit Ganguly as Jagannath aka Chokh Kota Joga, Debraj's former henchman
- Tulika Basu as Sunanda, Debraj's sister Abhi's paternal aunt
- Arun Bannerjee as Akhilesh, Sunanda's husband
- Kushal Chakraborty as Angshuman Roy aka Angshu, Debraj and Sunanda's brother
- Kunal Padhy as the new ACP
- Arghya Basu as Nayak's henchman and Abhi's colleague who gives information to Nayak (Mole in Department)
- Rittika Sen as Sreeja, Madhusudan's younger daughter and Puja's sister
- Pradip Dhar as Inspector Dhar / Cool Babu
- Rajat Ganguly as Ananda, Abhi's maternal uncle
- Jahidul Islam Shuvo as IPS, Abhi's colleague
- Vashcar Dev as IPS, Abhi's colleague
- Subrata Mukherjee as Dr. Banerjee

=== Special appearances ===
- Raj Chakraborty as film director (cameo)
- Mousumi Saha as Abhi's mother (deceased, flashback) (special appearance through footage)
- Biswanath Basu as Babla, a film artist supplier

== Soundtrack ==
Challenge 2

Soundtrack album
- Released: October 2012
- Recorded: 2012
- Genre: Feature film soundtrack
- Language: Bengali
- Label: SVF
- Producer: Shree Venkatesh Films

Official audio
- Challenge 2 - Full Album on YouTube

Singles from Challenge 2
- 1. "Challenge Nibi Na Sala" Released: 20 September 2012; 2. "Police Chorer Preme Poreche" Released: 27 September 2012; 3. "Pyaar Ka Bukhar" Released: 3 October 2012; 4. "Elo Je Maa" Released: 11 October 2012

Jeet Gannguli chronology
Ekla Akash (2012)	Challenge 2 (2012)	Bapi Bari Jaa (2012)

Savvy Gupta chronology
Goray Gondogol (2012)	Challenge 2 (2012)	Bawali Unlimited (2012)

The soundtrack of the film was scored by Jeet Gannguli and Savvy.

1	"Challenge Nibi Na Sala"	Suraj Jagan	4:20	Jeet Gannguli	Prasen (Prasenjit Mukherjee)
2	"Police Chorer Preme Poreche"	Abhijeet Bhattacharya and Akriti Kakkar	4:11	Jeet Gannguli	Raja Chanda
3	"Elo Je Maa"	Abhijeet Bhattacharya and Shreya Ghoshal	5:07	Jeet Gannguli	Priyo Chattopadhyay, Raja Chanda
4	"Pyaar Ka Bukhar"	Suraj Jagan	3:22	Savvy	Savvy

== Release ==
The film released on 19 October 2012 (Durga panchami) just before the Durga Pujo weekend in 270 theatres across India including West Bengal, Kolkata, Mumbai, Delhi, Bihar, Assam, Tripura, Madhya Pradesh and Chhattisgarh and was screened in both single screen and multiplexes. According to the producer duo Shrikant Mohta and Mahendra Soni, it was the first time a non-double-version Bengali flick has been released in 270 theatres across the country and continues its run in the non-niche segment of core viewers outside Bengal.

=== Critical reception ===
A critic from The Times of India wrote that "Over all, during this Devipokkho this film is a good option to fill-up the spare time you'll get in between pandal-hopping".
