= Bawali Unlimited =

- Directed by: Sujit Mondal
- Written by: Malay Bandopadhyay
- Screenplay by: Malay Bandopadhyay
- Produced by: Pankaj Agarwal
- Starring: Payel Sarkar; Sabyasachi Chakrabarty; Rajatava Dutta
- Music by: Savvy & Dev Sen
- Release date: 28 December 2012
- Country: India
- Language: Bengali

Bawali Unlimited is a 2012 Bengali comedy film directed by Sujit Mondal and produced by Pankaj Agarwal.

== Cast ==
- Joy Kumar Mukherjee as Santo/Soniya
- Payel as Munmun
- Sourav Nandy as Pappu
- Sabyasachi Chakrabarty Daman
- Rajatava Dutta as Mohan
- Kanchan Mallick as Fakir
- Sayak Chakraborty
- Dev ( Cameo appearance ) as Inspector Joy Banerjee
- Parthasarathi as Hagan

== Soundtrack ==
The soundtrack features 6 songs composed by Savvy and Dev Sen

No.	Title	Music	Singer(s)	Length
1.	"Bawali Unlimited"	Dev Sen	Dev Sen, Prasenjit Mallick
2.	"Ami Superstar"	Savvy	Suraj Jagan
3.	"Mon Ure Chole"	Dev Sen	Shaan, Kunal Ganjawala and June Banerjee
4.	"Strawberry"	Savvy	Shaan and Rana Mazumdar
5.	"Bhul Korechi"	Savvy	Rupankar, Raghab Chatterjee
6.	"Life is Shotti Fun"	Savvy	Tanya Chua

== See also ==
- Khoka 420
