= Idhika Paul =

Indian actress

- Born: Tumpa Paul; 2 July 1998 (age 28); Kolkata, West Bengal, India
- Citizenship: Indian
- Education: K.K Das College, Kolkata
- Occupation: Actress
- Years active: 2019—present

Tumpa Paul (born 2 July 1998) (Note: multiple sources:) know popularly as Idhika Paul, is an Indian actress who appears in Bengali-language television and films. She works in both Dhallywood and Tollywood film industries. She made her debut in Bangladeshi film with the film Priyotoma (2023) and her Indian Bengali film debut is Khadaan (2024).

== Career ==
Paul started her career in 2019 with a small role in Arabbya Rajani. Her first TV series debut in a lead character was in Rimli; a 2021 Bengali-language Indian TV series. Then she acted as a supporting character in 2022 Bengali-language Indian TV series Pilu.

Paul made her silver screen debut with Himel Ashraf's 2023 film Priyotoma. It became the highest grossing Bangladeshi film of 2023 and emerged as the third highest grossing Bangladeshi film of all time. In 2024, she made her Tollywood debut with Khadaan starring Dev. It emerged as the highest grossing Bengali film of 2024 and the second highest grossing Bengali film of all time. The song "Kishori" from the film Khadaan has become so popular that Idhika is also called "Kishori". She received widespread recognition for the film, and her vibrant performance was widely applauded.

In 2025, she returned to the Bangladeshi cinema with the romantic-action film Borbaad. It emerged as the highest grossing Bangladeshi film of 2025 as well as the highest grossing Bangladeshi film of all time.

Besides, after the massive success of Khadaan, Idhika starred opposite Dev in the period action thriller Raghu Dakat, which released during Durga Puja 2025.

== Filmography ==
Key
†	Denotes films that have not yet been released

- All films are in Indian Bengali-language, unless otherwise noted.

Year	Title	Role	Notes	Ref.
2023	Priyotoma	Iti	Debut film; Bangladeshi film	
2024	Khadaan	Latika		
2025	Borbaad	Neetu	Bangladeshi film	
2025	Bahurup	Uttara		
2025	Raghu Dakat	Saudamini		
2025	Projapati 2	Shree	Cameo appearance	
2026	DeSu7	Herself	Cameo appearance for the item number "Ilish Chandana"	
2027	Nissho †	TBA	Bangladeshi film; Filming	
TBA	Queen Victoria Aar Goyenda Kanaichawron †	TBA	Filming	
TBA	Kobi †	TBA	Delayed; Bangladeshi film	

== Television ==
List of television credits
Year	Serial	Role	Network	Notes	Ref.
2019	Arabbya Rajani	Rajkumari Rani	Colors Bangla	Episodic Role	
2019–2020	Kapalkundala	Padmabati	Star Jalsha	Negative Role	
2019–2021	Beder Meye Jyotsna	Lakkhi	Sun Bangla	Side Role	
2021	Rimli	Rimli	Zee Bangla	Lead Role	
2022	Pilu	Ranjini Basu Mallick "Ranja"	Zee Bangla	Antagonist turned Second Lead	

=== Television Shows ===
Year	Title	Channel	Note
2025	Pujor Sobcheye Boro Jalsha Season 2	Star Jalsha	Guest & Performer in "Season 2," featuring a "Double Dhamaka" dance with Dev at a Bonedi Bari setting.

=== Mahalaya ===
Year	Serial	Role	Network	Ref.
2021	Nanarupe Mahamaya	Devi Chamunda	Zee Bangla	
2022	Singhobahini Trinayani	Devi Chandika	Zee Bangla	
2025	Jago Maa Jago Durga	Devi Parvati, Devi Mahamaya and Devi Mahisasurmardini	Zee Bangla	

== Awards ==
Year	Award	Category	Character	Film/TV show
2023	Zee Bangla Sonar Sansar Awards	Favourite Sister-in-law	Ranja	Pilu
2025	Anandalok Awards	Best Debutant Female	Latika	Khadaan
2025	Filmfare Awards Bangla	Best Debut (Female)	Latika	Khadaan
2025	Tele Cine Awards	Best Debutant Actor- Female	Latika	Khadaan
2026	WBFJA Awards	Most Promising Actress	Saudamini	Raghu Dakat
