= Paglu =

2011 Indian Bengali film

- Theatrical poster of Paglu
- Directed by: Rajiv Kumar Biswas
- Written by: N.K. Salil
- Screenplay by: N.K. Salil
- Produced by: Nispal Singh
- Starring: Dev; Koel; Rajatava Dutta
- Cinematography: Kumud Verma
- Edited by: Rabiranjan Maitra; Aninda Chattopadhyay
- Music by: Jeet Gannguli
- Production company: Surinder Films
- Distributed by: Shree Venkatesh Films
- Release date: 3 June 2011
- Running time: 159 minutes
- Country: India
- Language: Bengali
- Budget: ₹5 crore
- Box office: ₹9.95 crore

Paglu (transl. Crazy) is a 2011 Indian Bengali-language romantic action film directed by Rajiv Kumar Biswas. Produced by Nispal Singh under the banner of Surinder Films, the film stars Dev and Koel Mallick, Rajatava Dutta in lead roles. The screenplay and the dialogues were written by N.K Salil, with the songs composed by Jeet Gannguli. The cinematography was handled by Kumud Verma, action and dance sequences were choreographed by Judo Ramu and Baba Yadav respectively. The film follows the story of how a college student falls in love with a non resident Indian girl. The movie was a remake of 2006 Telugu movie Devadasu.

Paglu marked the fourth collaboration of Dev with Koel. The film is the first instalment of the Paglu franchise. The film successfully ran more than 150 days in West Bengal was the highest grossing Bengali movie until the 2013 film Chander Pahar. The film currently stands as the tenth highest grossing Bengali movies of all time, with a lifetime collection of over ₹9.95 crore.

== Plot ==
The film begins with Dev, a college student, meeting Rimi– a girl who comes from the U.S. to take admission in 'Princeton' College for completing papers. She becomes a matter of rivalry between Dev and his rival in college, Ronnie, whom Dev defeats in a challenge and wins over Rimi. Rimi's father, a senator in the U.S., arrives in town and takes her back to the U.S. on the pretext of celebrating her birthday. He separates the couple, but they vow to get back to each other. Dev's visa is rejected so he organizes a public rally and pleads his love for Rimi which helps him to get his visa. Once he is in the U.S., he starts a game with Rimi's father which sees Dev laying down a challenge to him and also sees Dev getting beaten up by his security guards. He returns and takes Rimi away with him, but later Rimi goes back to her house. The film concludes with Dev going back to India and Rimi joining him there.

== Cast ==
- Dev as Dev aka Paglu
- Koel as Rimi Sen
- Rajatava Dutta as Gunodhar Sen, Rimi's Father, Senator of the United States
- Joheb Ahmed as Ronnie
- Tulika Basu as Madhabilata Sen aka Madhu, Rimi's mother
- Partha Sarathi Chakraborty as Krishna, Dev's friend
- Pradip Dhar as Mahadev, Madhabi's brother
- RJ Sayan as Dev's friend.
- Titas Bhowmik

== Soundtrack ==
Paglu

Soundtrack album by Jeet Gannguli
- Released: 2011
- Recorded: 2010
- Studio: Surinder Films
- Genre: Feature film soundtrack
- Label: Surinder Films
- Producer: Surinder Films

Jeet Gannguli chronology
Josh (2010)	Paglu (2011)	Bhorer Alo (2011)

Singles from Paglu
- 1. "Paglu Title Track" Released: 25 April 2011; 2. "Mon Bebagi" Released: 23 May 2011; 3. "Jane Mon" Released: 16 Jun 2011; 4. "Eshechi Toke Niye" Released: 7 July 2011; 5. "Prem Ki Bujhini" Released: 18 August 2011

All lyrics are written by Priyo Chattopadhyay, Prasen (Prasenjit Mukherjee); all music is composed by Jeet Gannguli.

Track listing
No.	Title	Lyrics	Singer(s)	Length
1.	"Paglu Title Track"	Priyo Chattopadhyay	Mika Singh & Akriti Kakkar	03:34
2.	"Prem Ki Bujhini"	Prasen (Prasenjit Mukherjee)	Zubeen Garg & Akriti Kakkar	03:51
3.	"Mon Bebagi"	Prasen (Prasenjit Mukherjee)	Kunal Ganjawala, Akriti Kakkar & Rana Mazumder	04:12
4.	"Eshechi Toke Niye"	Prasen (Prasenjit Mukherjee)	Mohit Chauhan	04:03
5.	"Jane Mon"	Prasen (Prasenjit Mukherjee)	Jeet Gannguli	03:52
6.	"Paglu - Remix"	Priyo Chattopadhyay	Mika Singh & Akriti Kakkar	04:08

== Sequel ==
Following the success of Paglu, Paglu 2 was made and released in 2012. Although the two films have different plots and characters, the film is considered the second installment in the Paglu franchise that began with Paglu. The second installment, Paglu 2 was also a hit.
