= Sanjhbati =

2019 Indian Bengali-language film

- Sanjhbati
- Directed by: Leena Gangopadhyay & Saibal Banerjee
- Written by: Leena Gangopadhyay
- Produced by: Atanu Ray Chaudhuri; Dev Entertainment Ventures
- Starring: Dev; Paoli Dam; Soumitra Chatterjee; Lily Chakravarty
- Cinematography: Sirsha Ray
- Edited by: Sujay Datta Ray
- Music by: Anupam Roy
- Production company: Bengal Talkies
- Distributed by: Bengal Talkies
- Release date: 20 December 2019
- Running time: 129:25 minutes
- Country: India
- Language: Bengali

Sanjhbati (transl. Evening Light) is an Indian Bengali drama film directed by Leena Gangopadhyay and Saibal Banerjee and produced by Atanu Ray Chaudhuri. The film was released on 20 December 2019 under the banner of Bengal Talkies.

== Plot ==
The film reflects the loneliness of an old lady, Sulekha, who lives alone because her son works outside of India. The tale has been spun around a lonely mother who is missing her son. It also tells how the old lady interacts with her caretakers. The lives of the caretakers have also been emphasized in a very interesting way.

== Cast ==
- Soumitra Chatterjee as Chana Dadu
- Lily Chakravarty as Sulekha Mitra
- Dev as Chandan Chatterjee aka Chandu
- Paoli Dam as Phuli
- Sohini Sengupta as Rupkotha aka Muni
- Sudip Mukherjee as Sulekha's elder son Bumba
- Santu Mukhopadhyay as Chandu's father
- Saptarshi Maulik as Bishu
- Saayoni Ghosh as Shyamali
- Shreya Bhattacharya as Mini, Chandu's sister
- Manjushree Ganguly as Bumba's Wife
- Asmee Ghosh as Titas, Bumba's Daughter
- Nitya Ganguly as Phuli's father
