= Khadaan =

2024 Indian Bengali action film by Soojit Dutta

- Theatrical release poster
- Directed by: Soojit Rino Dutta
- Screenplay by: Biswaroop Biswas; Soojit Rino Dutta; Additional screenplay: Rohit-Soumyo
- Dialogues by: Soojit Rino Dutta; Biswaroop Biswas
- Story by: Soojit Rino Dutta
- Produced by: Nispal Singh; Dev
- Starring: Dev; Jisshu Sengupta; Barkha Bisht; Idhika Paul; Anirban Chakrabarti
- Narrated by: Sabyasachi Chakraborty
- Cinematography: Shailesh Awashthi
- Edited by: MD. Kalam
- Music by: Songs: Rathijit Bhattacharjee; Nilayan Chatterjee; Savvy; Background score: Rathijit Bhattacharjee
- Production companies: Surinder Films; Dev Entertainment Ventures
- Distributed by: Surinder Films
- Release date: 20 December 2024
- Running time: 137:11 minutes
- Country: India
- Language: Bengali
- Budget: ₹6 crore
- Box office: ₹26 crore

Khadaan (Bengali pronunciation: [kʰa.dan]; transl. Quarry) is a 2024 Indian Bengali-language action thriller film written and directed by Soojit Rino Dutta. Produced by Nispal Singh and Dev under the banners of Surinder Films and Dev Entertainment Ventures respectively, the film stars Dev in dual roles, alongside Jisshu Sengupta in the lead, with an ensemble cast of Anirban Chakrabarti, Barkha Bisht, Idhika Paul, John Bhattacharya, Partha Sarathi Chakraborty, Sneha Bose, Sujan Neel Mukherjee, Sumit Ganguly and Raja Dutta. In the film, an ordinary fair organizer from a coal mine near the Damodar Valley, is recruited by his dead father's like-minded friend to be a partner in his coal syndicate, and there the former discovers the truth on some unfolded events.

The film was officially announced in January 2024 with a character motion poster. Principal photography commenced in February 2024 in Kolkata, with the major filming taking place in Asansol, Durgapur and Raniganj in subsequent schedules. The soundtrack of the film is composed by Rathijit Bhattacharjee, Savvy and Nilayan Chatterjee, while Bhattacharjee himself provides its score. The screenplay and dialogues of the film are written by Biswaroop Biswas and Dutta respectively. Shailesh Awashthi handled its cinematography and MD. Kalam did the editing. The film marks Dev's debut as creative director and a comeback to the action genre after a few years. (Note: Dev's last film in the mainstream field was Kidnap (2019))

Khadaan was released in the theatres on 20 December 2024, on the eve of Christmas, to positive reviews from critics and audience alike with specific appraisals of its cast performances, direction, script, action sequences, and musical score. The film set several box-office records for a Bengali film, overtaking those set by Dev starrer Chander Pahar (2013). Grossing over ₹26 crore, it became a blockbuster at the box office and emerged as the highest grossing Bengali film of 2024 and the third highest grossing Bengali film of all time. At the 8th Filmfare Awards Bangla, Khadaan received 14 nominations, including Best Film, Best Debut Director (Dutta) and Best Actor (Dev).

== Plot ==
1997: After losing everything in Bangladesh, Shyam comes to India as an illegal immigrant by crossing the border. Here he went to work as a laborer in the coal mines of the Damodar Valley and there he met Mohan, a Vaishnavite. Over the time, they developed a strong bond of friendship. Together with Shyam's strength and Mohan's mastermind, they gained monopoly control over the entire colliery. They had developed their complete influence over the coal syndicate.

This amplification in power bought them in a stand against the local MLA, Shehzad Siddique. In the meantime, Shyam had become a messiah for the poor labourers, mostly belonging from the local adivasi community. He didn't support the idea of grabbing their agricultural lands and on the top, gave them 20 percent share of the coal khadaan. This brought him in contact with the adivasi leader, Mandi.

In a heated confrontation and argument, Shyam killed a police officer. This resulted in him going behind the bars, at a time when he had a newborn child and wife Jamuna. But he mysteriously dies inside the jail.

2024: Now, Mohan has become a rich industrialist in that region through the illegal coal syndicate and has also gained monopoly over the mines. He gently offers Shyam's son Madhu to join his lead team, who is just a coal transporter now. This does not go well with Makhan, Mohan's son who had hoped to inherit his father's business .With the passage of time, as Madhu becomes one of Mohan's most trusted people, he gets to know the reason behind his father's death. Madhu now wants to take revenge against the atrocities committed against his father.

In the end, it is revealed that Mohan was the main culprit behind his father's death. Mohan, who was jealous of Shyam mixed sleeping pills in Shyam's food due to which Shyam went into deep sleep. During this opportunity, Mohan strangulated him to death, about which Shyam was totally unaware since he was in deep sleep and in order to prevent suspicion, Mohan arranged the incident like as if Shyam committed suicide.

Madhu upon hearing this gets enraged and kills Mohan just like Shyam was once killed. With Mohan removed, Madhu becomes the unchallenged crime boss of the coal mines.

== Cast ==
- Dev in dual roles
  - Shyam Mahato
  - Madhu, Shyam and Jamuna's son
- Jisshu Sengupta as Mohan Das, Shyam's friend turned enemy
- Barkha Bisht as Jamuna, Shyam's wife (voiceover by Satakshi Nandy)
- Idhika Paul as Latika, Madhu's wife
- Sneha Bose as Rekha, Mohan's second wife
- Anirban Chakrabarti as Balai Mandi
- Partha Sarathi Chakraborty as Gokul Das
- John Bhattacharya as Makhan Das, Mohan's son
- Sumit Ganguly as Billu Paswan, a coal businessman and later iron businessman
- Sujan Neel Mukherjee as Shehzada Siddiqui, the local MLA, later minister
- Raja Dutta as Bhojon, Mohan's bodyguard
- Joydip Dey as Sahani, Mahali's henchman and former assistant of Siddiqui
- Aayan Sohan as a coal dealer
- Biswajit Ghosh as Madhu's assistant and former right hand man of Billu Paswan
- Jina Tarafder as Makhan's girlfriend
- Raima Pal as an oppressed worker
- Debashis Nath as Latika's father
- Pradip Bhattacharya as Daadu, a worker
- Jayshree Bose as Deeda, a blind lady

== Production ==
=== Development ===
In August 2023, there were rumours that Raj Chakraborty is collaborating with Dev for an action film, which would be based on coal smuggling, under the production of Shree Venkatesh Films. But later it was revealed during mid-September, that Dev opted out of Chakraborty's project due to date issues and Mithun Chakraborty signed the film. In December 2023, it was confirmed that the coal smuggling based film originally was pitched by Soojit Rino Dutta, while Raj Chakraborty's film was different, which Dev previously turned down. Surinder Films came on the board associating with Dev Entertainment Ventures to co-produce the film.

=== Pre-production and announcement ===
Initially during the timespace of 2015–2016, Soojit Rino Dutta began researching at the coal mining areas and explored the subject of coal smuggling and the socio-political events related with the residents of those surroundings. After he finished the research, playwright Biswaroop Biswas completed the screenplay, while Dutta himself wrote dialogues. Since most of the film takes place in a rural backdrop, Dev was reported to have learned the Santhali accent for the film. The story is set against the backdrop of Raniganj, located in the region of Asansol. Initially Nilayan Chatterjee was reported to be the music director of the film, while Rathijit Bhattacharjee and Savvy also came on the board along with him. Cinematographer Shailesh Awashthi, who previously worked with Dev for Challenge 2 (2012) and Rangbaaz (2013), was signed for the film, with MD. Kalam as the editor. Aejaz Gulab Shaikh, Sunil Rodrigues and Rajesh Kannan were roped to design the action sequences, whereas Bablu Singha handled the production designing. D. Shankaraiyaa aka Shanker Master and Debraj Ghoshal were chosen for dance choreography.

The film was announced by the makers on 1 January 2024 with a motion poster, which revealed the title of the film as Khadaan. It also revealed the first look of Dev's character as Shyam Mahato in the film. On 16 January 2024, Dev, along with his team including Soojit Dutta, went to recce at the Sonpur Bazari Coal mines at ECL in Pandaveshwar, accompanied by ECL officers, to consider the place as one of the shooting spots. On that occasion, Dev also inaugurated his wax statue at the Asansol Wax Museum, organized by sculptor Sushanta Roy.

=== Casting ===
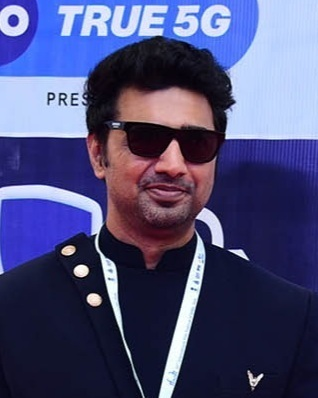
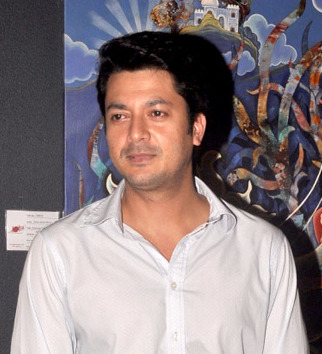
The film marks the fifth collaboration between Dev and Jisshu Sengupta, 8 years after Zulfiqar (2016).

Chanchal Chowdhury entered talks to play a pivotal role in the film, supposed to be the antagonist, however he refused due to time constraints. In February 2026, he shared his guilt for declining the role. Post Chowdhury's exit, Mosharraf Karim, Jeetu Kamal and Anirban Bhattacharya were reported to be proposed for that role in the film, but ultimately Jisshu Sengupta came on the board and was announced playing a Vaishnavite character (Note: The Vaishnavite character of Mohan Das played by Jisshu, was itself a homage to the actor's portrayal of Chaitanya Mahaprabhu in the TV Series Mahaprabhu (1998).) of Dev's friend in the film in January 2024. It marked Dev and Jisshu together in a film 8 years after Zulfiqar in 2016. Jisshu, the captain of the team Bengal Tigers in the Celebrity Cricket League, conditioned to shoot only if he got leave to play, to which the makers agreed. Later, Idhika Paul was announced as the film's lead actress, and Soumitrisha Kundu was reported to be another lead actress of the film, but it was proved to be a rumour when Barkha Bisht joined the cast for that role. It marked pairing up between Dev and Barkha, 14 years after Dui Prithibi in 2010. Anirban Chakrabarti was confirmed to play an important role in the film. In February 2024, Sumit Ganguly, Raja Dutta and Parthasarathi Chakraborty joined the cast, each of them reuniting with Dev after a few years.

Bonny Sengupta was approached for a pivotal role in the film, but he rejected it, because he didn't want to work in any dark or negative character, also preferring to maintain his romantic hero image among the audience. Then Vikram Chatterjee was considered for the role, who had to turn down due to other commitments. Later, Amartya Ray was offered the role, but after he rejected it, John Bhattacharya joined the cast in March 2024, for the role. In an interview to Aajkaal, Bhattacharya stated, "It is absolutely difficult to leave the opportunity of sharing screen with two acting giants, Dev da and Jisshu da".

=== Filming ===
On 14 February 2024, on the eve of Saraswati Puja, the Muhurat of the film was performed at the office of Surinder Films. The makers planned to shoot the first schedule of the film in Kolkata in February 2024, after Dev would complete his commitments with Tekka (2024). The filming commenced on 16 February 2024 with a short schedule in Kolkata, and also a revelation of the first look posters of Dev and Jisshu. In an interview to the Anandabazar Patrika, the director informed about the difficulties of finding a suitable shooting spot in Kolkata. On 25 February 2024, an action sequence was shot at the tram depot in Nonapukur, under the supervision of fight master Rajesh Kannan. On 27 February, the team was spotted in Shobhabazar, where a particular scene was filmed at Chhaya cinema hall. The first schedule of the film was completed on 1 March 2024.

From 4 March 2024, the second schedule commenced in the coal mines of Asansol, having major parts of the film been shot there, where Jisshu Sengupta joined the cast members. In this schedule, the song "Kishori" was filmed for 4 days, with an inclusion of 20 dancers. The song was picturized on Dev and Idhika Paul and was choreographed by D. Shankaraiyaa. An action sequence in the mud was shot with Dev and John Bhattacharya in the timespace of 10 and 12 March 2024 in Durgapur, which was designed by Rajesh Kannan. The remaining parts of this schedule, were filmed in the Asansol and Raniganj coalfields where Dev had gone earlier to recce, with some parts of the film being filmed Bankura. A scene where Dev puts a burning cigar inside his mouth, was finally shot after he had injured his lips 55 times with hot flashes from the cigar, along with burning his tongue and beard, during the retakes. A specific scene was filmed at the Randiha Barrage beside the Damodar River in Panagarh, where Dev and Jisshu met the fans who came to see the shooting. On 13 March 2024, the makers uploaded second poster of the film, informing that the second schedule of the film had been completed.

After the completion of Dev's commitments with the Lok Sabha elections 2024, the shooting resumed in July 2024 again in Asansol. For 3 days, the team shot in the rural environment at Nalban in Bidhannagar but had to shoot indoor on the fourth day due to heavy rains. From 19 July to 22 July, the song "Radharani" was filmed portraying the a Kirtan programme. The song "Haye Re Biye" was shot in this schedule. The same month, an action sequences was shot at least 400 ft. deep in the coalmines of Jamuria for a week. In August 2024, a massive underwater sequence was shot in the Damodar River. The remaining parts in the schedule were filmed across Durgapur, Asansol and Bankura. During this schedule, on 28 September 2024, the song "Rajar Raja" was shot in Baranagar, also with a high octane action sequence. The song was filmed at the aforementioned place, constructing a special set of a village fair. Along with 200 dancers, Dev danced to this song on the sand in 42 °C (108 °F) scorching heat, under Shankaraiyaa's supervision. On 1 October 2024, the producers informed with a new poster that the filming has been completed and wrapped up.

=== Post-production ===
Post-production for the film began in July 2024 and went on for four months as the film involves extensive computer graphics and VFX. The VFX work of the film was provided by Surinder Films VFX, where Tamal Roy served as the visual effects supervisor. Dibyo and Soumyo Roy were the sound designers. The first half of the film was edited by October 2024.

Barkha Bisht and Idhika Paul were reported to dub their parts in late-September 2024, while Dev and Jisshu Sengupta began dubbing their portions in October 2024.

== Soundtrack ==
Khadaan

Soundtrack album by Rathijit Bhattacharjee, Nilayan Chatterjee and Savvy
- Released: 2024
- Recorded: 2023–24
- Genre: Film soundtrack
- Length: 27:31
- Language: Bengali
- Label: Surinder Films
External audio
- Khadaan Official Audio Jukebox on YouTube

The music of the film has been composed by Rathijit Bhattacharjee, Savvy and Nilayan Chatterjee. The lyrics have been written by Nilayan Chatterjee himself in his compositions while Ritam Sen has penned the lyrics for Rathijit Bhattacharjee and Savvy.

The first single "Rajar Raja" was released on 12 November 2024. It marked Dev in a dance song after a decade of films including no dance numbers. The second single "Haye Re Biye" was released on 22 November 2024. The third single "Kishori" was released on 5 December 2024. The fourth single "Baap Eseche" was released on 12 December 2024. It served as a promotional track for the film.

The remaining songs "Radharani", "Royal Fighter" , "Dhinak Na Tin" and "Phiraiyya Dao" along with the full audio jukebox was released on 18 December 2024, at the music launch event held at South City Mall. In February 2025, "Kishori" became the fastest Indian Bengali song to register 100 million views on YouTube.

Track listing
No.	Title	Lyrics	Music	Singer(s)	Length
1.	"Rajar Raja"	Ritam Sen	Savvy	Dev Arijit	3:15
2.	"Haye Re Biye"	Nilayan Chatterjee	Nilayan Chatterjee	Abhijeet Bhattacharya, June Banerjee, Sudip Nandy	3:45
3.	"Kishori"	Ritam Sen	Rathijit Bhattacharjee	Rathijit Bhattacharjee, Antara Mitra	3:26
4.	"Baap Eseche"	Nilayan Chatterjee	Nilayan Chatterjee	Ishan Mitra	3:00
5.	"Radharani"	Ritam Sen	Rathijit Bhattacharjee	Arkadeep Mishra (Arka)	3:58
6.	"Royal Fighter"	Ritam Sen	Rathijit Bhattacharjee	Bullet B-One	3:14
7.	"Dhinak Na Tin"	Nilayan Chatterjee	Nilayan Chatterjee	Debosmita Deb	3:03
8.	"Phiraiyya Dao"	Nilayan Chatterjee	Nilayan Chatterjee	Sohini Saha	3:50
Total length:					27:31

== Marketing ==
The teaser was initially planned to release on 14 August 2024. But it was postponed as a sign of solidarity with the then ongoing protests against the RG Kar rape and murder incident. The teaser was finally dropped on 29 August 2024, 2 weeks after the initially scheduled date. It was praised by eminent personalities like Srijit Mukherjee.

On 30 Oct 2024, Dev was invited in the opening ceremony of a Kali Puja in Kalyani, where a short promotion was done. As a part of the ground level promotions at an event in Medinipur, Jisshu Sengupta dialed Dev and spoke out one of his prime dialogues from the movie in November 2024. The same month, when the song "Rajar Raja" was unveiled. The makers announced people to recreate the signature step by recording their own dance performances to the song and sharing these videos across social media platforms.

Anirban Chakrabarti's character in the film was revealed with his first look poster on 18 November 2024. Barkha Bisht's character from the film was revealed with a motion poster on 19 November 2024. As a part of the marketing campaign, the makers launched official merchandise of the film. They included prime dialogues, catchy quotes, song names and title of the film printed on T-shirts. This was the first time in many years that official merchandise has been launched for a Bengali film as a part of the promotions. On 21 November 2024, Sneha Bose's character from the film was revealed with a motion poster.

A song launch event was arranged by the makers at Flamboyant in Park Street, where the song "Haye Re Biye" was launched. In this event, Dev, Barkha Bisht and Sneha Bose were observed dancing to the beat of the song. Jisshu Sengupta was dialed by Dev and was asked if he would be a part of Shah Rukh Khan's upcoming film King (2025). On 27 November 2024, the makers released a motion poster addressing Idhika Paul's character from the film. The same day, the makers announced people to create reels by grooving the hook step of "Haye Re Biye" and also revealed to win the Khadaan T-shirts exclusively.

The makers declared "Khadaan Tour", a massive strategy of promotion in several towns across West Bengal including Durgapur (at Junction Mall), Bardhaman (at Burdwan Town Hall), Howrah (at Bargachia Book Fair), Madhyamgram (at Star Mall), Malda (at Malda College), Raiganj (at Raiganj University), Kalyani (at PRM City Mall), Siliguri (Vega Circle Mall), Howrah (Amta Bakshi Ground), Barrackpore (Swami Vivekananda University) and Hooghly (Rishra Lenin Ground) on a Khadaan themed bus, featuring the characters in a giant poster all over the bus. Another motion poster was released on 1 December 2024, which revealed the character of Raja Dutta from the film. The second teaser titled "Pre-trailer" was released on 2 December 2024, by conducting a launching event at Miraj Cinemas in Salt Lake.

After the promotions at Durgapur, Dev visited Tarapith Temple in Birbhum to seek blessings for the success of the film. The event at Bardhaman created a lot of chaos as groups of excited fans broke the barricade and got up on the stage to meet the actors. Similar unprecedented events took place during the Madhyamgram promotions due to failure of the event organisers as an unexpected number of people turned up for the event. The police had to "lathi-charge" to disperse the enthusiastic crowd to avoid chances of any stampede and also to normalise the National Highway 12, which was completely blocked, creating difficulties for the vehicles and commuters. Dev along with the cast and crew visited the Naihati Boro Maa Kali Temple in Naihati, to take her blessings for the success of the film. On 17 December 2024, Sourav Ganguly and Jhulan Goswami along with other cricketers played a friendly cricket match with the cast and crew of Khadaan as a part of the promotions.

Initially scheduled to release on 15 December 2024, the trailer release was delayed due to technical issues. The trailer was released on 18 December 2024. The advance booking was started from 18 December 2024, just 2 days prior to the release. Dev informed that they couldn't open the advance bookings because the distributors were struggling to get enough shows due to large number of screens given to Pushpa 2. Dev mentioned on his X handle that, if there is any place where there are no theatres but the people want to watch the film, they makers will make the necessary arrangements for a temporary screening. After the first weekend from release, Dev visited the Kalighat Temple in Kolkata to take blessings of Maa Kali.

On 4 January 2025, after the completion of 53 million views of the song "Kishori", the characterizations of Dev and Idhika were felicitated by Amul in their special cartoony style. Later on 9 January 2025, the makers announced "Khadaan Tour of Single Screens" in several towns including Bagnan (Chitrabani Cinema), Dakshin Barasat (Mahamaya Talkies), Tollygunge (Navina Cinema), Barrackpore (Atindra Cinema), Dunlop (Sonali Cinema) and Panskura (Charulata Cinema). In spite of the film's success, about this post-release promotion, Dev cited, "It is necessary to conduct this tour in single screens in the rural areas and make people more hall-oriented. At the same time, the hall owners must be convinced to renovate the halls as people still celebrate the excitement of mass films in single screens, not in multiplexes".

== Release ==
=== Theatrical ===
The film was released in the theatres on 20 December 2024 with 282 shows, on the eve of Christmas weekend. With the first show for the film starting from 2 am at SVF Cinemas in Raiganj, Khadaan became the first Bengali film to keep a midnight show for the audience and also became the first Bengali film to have a housefull show at midnight. It had at least 392 shows across Bengal from second week, which eventually increased later.

The film had its nationwide release on 3 January 2025 with 36 shows in major cities including Delhi, Mumbai, Hyderabad, Pune, Jamshedpur, Bengaluru and Ahmedabad, having maximum shows across Assam. Later, shows for the film were increased after it registered housefull shows in most cities. The film had its 1st Grand International Premiere in Dubai on 25 January 2025 at Star Cinemas, Al Ghurair Centre. It had a Special Screening in Bangkok on 9 February 2025 at EmQuartier and in Melbourne on 9 February 2025 at Hoyts Melbourne Central.

Khadaan set the record for the largest bookings in Bengali cinema, surpassing the record previously held by Dev's film, Amazon Obhijaan, released in 2017. This record was achieved in both single-screen theatres and multiplex chains.

== Reception ==
=== Box office ===
The film collected around est. ₹1.5 crore on its opening day. It marked the second highest opening day gross of all time for an Indian Bengali film after Amazon Obhijaan (2017) at that time. Grossing an average of ₹1 crore daily, it became the fastest Indian Bengali film to cross the ₹6 crore mark in just 5 days. At the end of first week, the film grossed over ₹7.26 crore and emerged as the highest first week grosser for an Indian Bengali film. In 5 days, it became the fastest Indian Bengali film to gross over ₹25 crore at the box office. On 1 January 2025, the film collected over ₹6.6 crore, which is the highest single day collection for an Indian Bengali film. After 15 days, it grossed over ₹20.3 crore. After 3 weeks, it grossed over ₹25 crore. By the end of January 2025, it netted over ₹25.5 crore. At the end of its theatrical run, the film's grossing net collection over ₹26 crore against a production budget of ₹6 crore. It ran in the theatres for over 150 days and emerged as the highest grossing Bengali film of 2024 and the third highest grossing Indian Bengali film of all time.

=== Critical reception ===
Subhasmita Kanji of Hindustan Times rated the film 4.5 out 5 stars and opined "Khadaan is a paisa-vasool masala entertainer. Every frame speaks of the huge production value of the film, in which Dev's character aroused back the memories and nostalgia of his initial films." She praised Idhika's vibrant acting, Anirban's character, Rathijit and Nilayan's music and the storytelling but criticised the script for being predictable at certain points. Sandipta Bhanja of Sangbad Pratidin reviewed the film on a positive note and wrote "Dev is the heartstring of the film. His ostracized action hero avatar is a visual treat while his romantic avatar triggers back the nostalgia of his initial days." She praised Jisshu and Idhika's acting, John's debut performance, Anirban's tribal accent and Dev's comeback to commercial genre after a decade but criticized the twists for being somewhat predictable.

Addressing Dev as the "Dynamo" of the film, the IWM Buzz critic Shatakshi Ganguly opined "There's a certain electricity in the air when a film as ambitious as Khadaan makes its way to the screen. From its first explosive frames, the film establishes itself as a film with grand ambitions. As Shyam Mahato, Dev is at once fiery and grounded, oscillating between moments of sheer rage and heartfelt vulnerability. Quiet, composed, and deeply empathetic, Jisshu's presence as Mohan serves as the moral compass of the story." Anurupa Chakraborty of the Indian Express rated the film 4.5/5 stars and highlighted "Khadaan is a commercial entertainer with high octane action, romance and songs. The chemistry between Dev and Jisshu drives the film." She specially praised Jisshu's performance in the film, the BGM, John's short cameo and Dev's comeback in mass avatar after many years but mentioned that the story could have been written better.

Sangita Chowdhury of Aajkal Bangla rated the film 4.5 out of 5 stars and quoted "Apart from the performances by the whole cast, Shailesh Awashthi's cinematography is the main highlight of the film, which takes the viewers to a new world." Agnivo Niyogi of The Telegraph reviewed the film and noted "The synergy between Shyam and Mohan anchors the film and helps this otherwise straightforward story sail through." He criticised weakly written characters for Idhika and Barkha but specially praised the soundtrack and picturisation on the Kirtan track "Radharani".

Poorna Banerjee of The Times of India rated the film 4 out of 5 stars and quoted "Khadaan thrives on Dev's commanding presence and a lot of action sequences that are well shot. For fans of action dramas and larger-than-life protagonists, this might just hit the mark." She praised the cinematography, editing, music and high octane action sequences but mentioned Idhika's role to be unimpressive. A reviewer from ETV Bharat noted "Khadaan is a full masala entertainer that brought Dev back to his old avatar, characterised by heavy action scenes and romantic sequences." Although Jisshu's seasoned acting, Anirban' character, John's debut, Idhika's performance and chemistry with Dev was praised, it was stated that the screenplay could have been better.

== Future ==
The ending of the film hints towards a sequel. But, in an interview, Dev mentioned that Khadaan 2 will be made depending upon the reception of Khadaan and only if the maiden part becomes commercially successful.
