= Zulfiqar (film) =

- Film poster
- Directed by: Srijit Mukherji
- Written by: Srijit Mukherji
- Screenplay by: Srijit Mukherji
- Based on: Julius Caesar and Antony and Cleopatra by William Shakespeare
- Produced by: Shrikant Mohta; Mahendra Soni
- Starring: Prosenjit Chatterjee; Kaushik Sen; Dev; Ankush Hazra; Parambrata Chatterjee; Jisshu Sengupta; Nusrat Jahan; Kanchan Mullick; Rahul Banerjee; Paoli Dam; Neel Mukherjee; June Malia; Kyra Dutt
- Cinematography: Soumik Haldar
- Edited by: Srijit Mukherji; Anindya Chattopadhyay
- Music by: Anupam Roy
- Production company: Shree Venkatesh Films
- Distributed by: Shree Venkatesh Films
- Release date: 7 October 2016
- Running time: 138:18 minutes (A) / 135:35 minutes (V/UA)
- Country: India
- Languages: Bengali; Hindi
- Budget: ₹5.5 Cr
- Box office: ₹7.7 Cr

Zulfiqar (Bengali pronunciation: [zʊl.fɪˈqar]) is a 2016 Indian Bengali-language epic gangster action crime film written and directed by Srijit Mukherji. Produced by Shrikant Mohta and Mahendra Soni under the banner of Shree Venkatesh Films, the film is a modern-day adaptation of William Shakespeare’s two tragedies—Julius Caesar and Antony and Cleopatra. It stars Prosenjit Chatterjee in the titular role, alongside an ensemble cast of Dev, Parambrata Chatterjee, Jisshu Sengupta, Ankush Hazra, Kaushik Sen, Nusrat Jahan, Rahul Banerjee and Paoli Dam in the leads. The film revolves around Zulfiqar Ahmed, a powerful figure in the Kolkata underworld whose rise to dominance triggers betrayal and eventual assassination by his trusted associates.

The soundtrack and background score of the film were composed by Anupam Roy and Indraadip Dasgupta respectively. The cinematography of this film was by Soumik Halder, while the editing was done by Mukherji himself and Anindya Chattopadhyay. The action sequences were choreographed by Javed-Aejaz.

The film released during Durga Puja. Despite receiving mostly negative reviews, the film became a hit at the box office and was one of the highest grossing Bengali films of 2016 as Praktan is the biggest hit of 2016.

== Plot ==
Zulfiqar Ahmed is a Godfather figure and the most prominent member of Syndicate - a powerful organization which oversees most of the happenings in the heart of the city. Basheer Khan, a member of Syndicate is a nationalist, a gangster and the best friend of Zulfiqar, who does not support terrorism. Tony Braganza is the brain of The Syndicate who oversees the financial things of the organization, and Markaz Ali is the brawn. If need be, Tony can shoot a bullet, but he is a man of the papers. Tony and Markaz have grown up together and they are inseparable. Though Zulfiqar is married to Karishma Ahmed, he continues an extramarital affair with Rani Talapatra, a money-lender, and the owner of the "Blue Nile Bar", who in turns loves Markaz and vice versa. Kashinath Kundu is the wily and scheming guy of The Syndicate, who has an ambition for power. The Syndicate also have some corrupt government officials as members, like Customs officer Kaushik Sinha, Port Trust officer Tribhuban Gupta, and a policeman, Laltu Das. Zulfiqar is more equal than the others who carries his aura lightly, but even in this group of equals, his opinion on matters of business and policy weigh a bit more. Not everyone likes this including Kashinath Kundu who fuels Basheer's growing individuality and makes him believe that Zulfiqar was the one who gave shelter to Lashkar-e-Taiba terrorists who came to West Bengal some days earlier by showing him some fake photographs and documents.

Basheer, fully convinced about Zulfiqar's involvement in helping the terrorists to hide in West Bengal, reluctantly decides to kill him with the other conspirators on the auspicious occasion of Eid al-Fitr. Karishma has nightmares of some upcoming danger that is yet to take place with Zulfiqar and repeatedly prevents him from going out on Eid al-Fitr. Zulfiqar, to calm down his wife, decides not to get out. But Danish, Syndicate's member, escorts him to go out. Tony and Markaz had no idea about the conspiracy and they were prevented from attending the meeting by Tribhuban, who held both of them for some other cause. During the Syndicate meeting, Mithilesh Sikdar urges the members to rid his brother of the exile, given to him due to the latter's hand in drug dealing. Though majority of the members gave their nod to the proposal, Zulfiqar denies the proposal and also told that there is no one to oppose him. At this point, Sharafat Qasim shoots Zulfiqar from behind, with others, including Kashinath, Sinha, Danish, Shishir Tili and Basheer shooting a bullet each to end Zulfiqar's rule once and for all, whereas Laltu Das and Pavel Lateef escape due to the fact that Basheer didn't want to kill any innocent.

After Zulfiqar's death, Tony and Markaz, along with Zulfiqar's nephew Akhtar Ahmed, Laltu Das, Rani, Pavel and Tony's favourite aide Chenno Bablu go into hiding. Basheer calls them, asking to return on the occasion of Zulfiqar's funeral. At the funeral, Basheer delivers an oration defending his actions and for the moment the crowd, which have gathered outside the assassination spot to know the reasons for Zulfiqar's murder, is on the conspirators' side. However, Tony and Markaz, with a subtle and eloquent speech over Zulfiqar's corpse deftly turns public opinion against the assassins by manipulating the emotions of the common people. Tony, even as he states his intentions against it, rouses the mob to avenge Zulfiqar's murder. A massive gang war is triggered and the conspirators are forced to go into hiding, but one by one Markaz, Tony and Laltu finds and kills Tribhuban, Shishir Tili, and Sinha's twin brother (whom they mistake for Sinha). Basheer reveals that his beloved wife Pariza had committed suicide under the stress of his absence after which the conspirators prepare for a gang war against the loyalists. That night, Zulfiqar's ghost appears to Basheer and tell him, he too will know everything when the right time comes and then once more the ghost will appear. Skirmishes and shootouts occur between the loyalists and the conspirators, in which Pavel, Mithilesh and Qasim are killed. Danish is shot during another shootout, and before his last breath he whispers something to Basheer. Kashinath inadvertently reveals his conspiracy against Zulfiqar to Basheer, the faking of the photographs and how he brainwashed Basheer into killing his best friend, after which Basheer informs him what Danish told him in his last moments- Kashinath is the illegitimate brother of Pariza. Now both of them indulges in a hand-to-hand combat, which ends when they kill each other. With his dying breath, Basheer again sees the ghost of Zulfiqar, as promised before.

The remaining part of the story follows the growing ambition of Akhtar. With the Syndicate no more existing, Akhtar systematically eliminates every obstacle in his path, including Tony, Markaz, Rani, Chheno and Laltu, thus ultimately becoming the new, all-powerful gangster of the area once ruled by the Syndicate.

== Cast ==
Actor	Role	Based on
Prosenjit Chatterjee	Zulfiqar Ahmed	Julius Caesar
Kaushik Sen	Basheer Khan	Marcus Brutus
Parambrata Chatterjee	Tony Braganza	Mark Antony
Dev	Markaz Ali	Mark Antony
Ankush Hazra	Akhtar Ahmed	Octavius
Jisshu Sengupta	Kashinath Kundu	Cassius
Rahul Banerjee	Laltu Das	Lepidus
Paoli Dam	Karishma Ahmed	Calpurnia
Nusrat Jahan	Rani Talapatra	Cleopatra
Kyra Dutt	Albeena Ahmed	Octavia
Kanchan Mullick	Chheno Bablu	Enobarbus
June Malia	Pariza Khan	Porcia
Sujan Mukhopadhyay	Kaushik Sinha/unnamed twin brother	Cinna the conspirator/Cinna the poet
Srijato	Tribhuban Gupta	Trebonius
Bharat Kaul	Parvez Maqsood	Pompey the Great
Aryann Roy	Sharafat Qasim	Casca
Prasun Gain	Mithilesh Sikder	Metellus Cimber
Subhra Sourav Das	Saqlain Maqsood	Sextus Pompey
Barun Chakraborty	Shishir Tili	Cicero
Kalyan Ray	Peer Baba	Soothsayer
Debapriyo Mukherjee	Danish Bashar	Decius Brutus
Aritra Dutta	Pavel Lateef	Popilius Lena
Biplab Dasgupta	MLA	—N/a
Srijit Mukherjee	Person in crowd	—N/a
Biswajit Chakraborty	Police Officer	—N/a

== Production ==
The shooting of the film started in January 2016.

== Soundtrack ==
Zulfiqar

Soundtrack album by Anupam Roy
- Released: 2016
- Recorded: 2016
- Genre: Feature film soundtrack
- Label: SVF
- Producers: Shrikant Mohta; Mahendra Soni

Anupam Roy chronology
Pink (2016)	Zulfiqar (2016)	Runningshaadi.com (2017)

No.	Title	Writer(s)	Singer(s)	Length
1.	"Ami Aajkal Bhalo Achi"	Anupam Roy	Anupam Roy	4:53
2.	"Ek Purono Masjide"	Anupam Roy	Nachiketa Chakraborty	5:07
3.	"Ghawrbaari"	Anupam Roy	Anupam Roy	4:46
4.	"Katakuti Khela"	Anupam Roy	Shaan, Shreya Ghoshal	3:54
5.	"Katakuti Khela (Acoustic Version)"		Anupam Roy	4:23
6.	"Qatl E Zulfiqar"	Anupam Roy	Timir Biswas	4:59
7.	"Katakuti Khela Acoustic Version"	Anupam Roy	Anupam Roy	4:59

== Reception ==
=== Critical response ===
The film received mixed to negative reviews from the critics. The film was rated 2.5/5 by reviewers of The Times of India. The reviewers lambasted the storytelling, acting, costume design etc. commenting-"The result of the Shakespearean 'fusion' is a film that is an overcooked, hyperventilating stream of images and sound stretching for well over two hours". Editors from Indian Express also critiqued the Shakespearean adoption rating the film 2/5.

=== Controversy ===
The film was subjected to controversy as it showed the leading characters, mostly Muslims, associated with illegal activities. Chairman of the State Minorities Commission Imtiaz Ali Shah reported the incident to the Chief Minister of West Bengal Mamata Banerjee, following which Mukherji had agreed to address the issues. Sources said Banerjee herself ordered some cuts in the film.

Assistant Professor at Aliah University Mohammad Reyaz wrote a critique of stereotyping of Muslims in the film which led to the director Srijit Mukherji responding with a note on Facebook.

== Awards and nominations ==
Award	Category	Recipient(s)	Result
2nd Filmfare Awards East	Filmfare Award for Best Actor - Bengali	Dev	Nominated
2nd Filmfare Awards East	Filmfare Award for Best Supporting Actor - Bengali	Jisshu Sengupta	Nominated
2nd Filmfare Awards East	Filmfare Award for Best Supporting Actor - Bengali	Kaushik Sen	Nominated
2nd Filmfare Awards East	Filmfare Award for Music - Bengali	Anupam Roy	Nominated
2nd Filmfare Awards East	Filmfare Award for Best Lyrics - Bengali	Anupam Roy for Ek Purono Masjide	Nominated
2nd Filmfare Awards East	Filmfare Award for Best Playback (Male) - Bengali	Anupam Roy for Ami Aajkal Bhalo Achi	Nominated
2nd Filmfare Awards East	Filmfare Award for Best Playback (Male) - Bengali	Nachiketa Chakraborty for Ek Purono Masjide	Won
