= Dev (Bengali actor) =

Indian actor, producer and politician (born 1982)

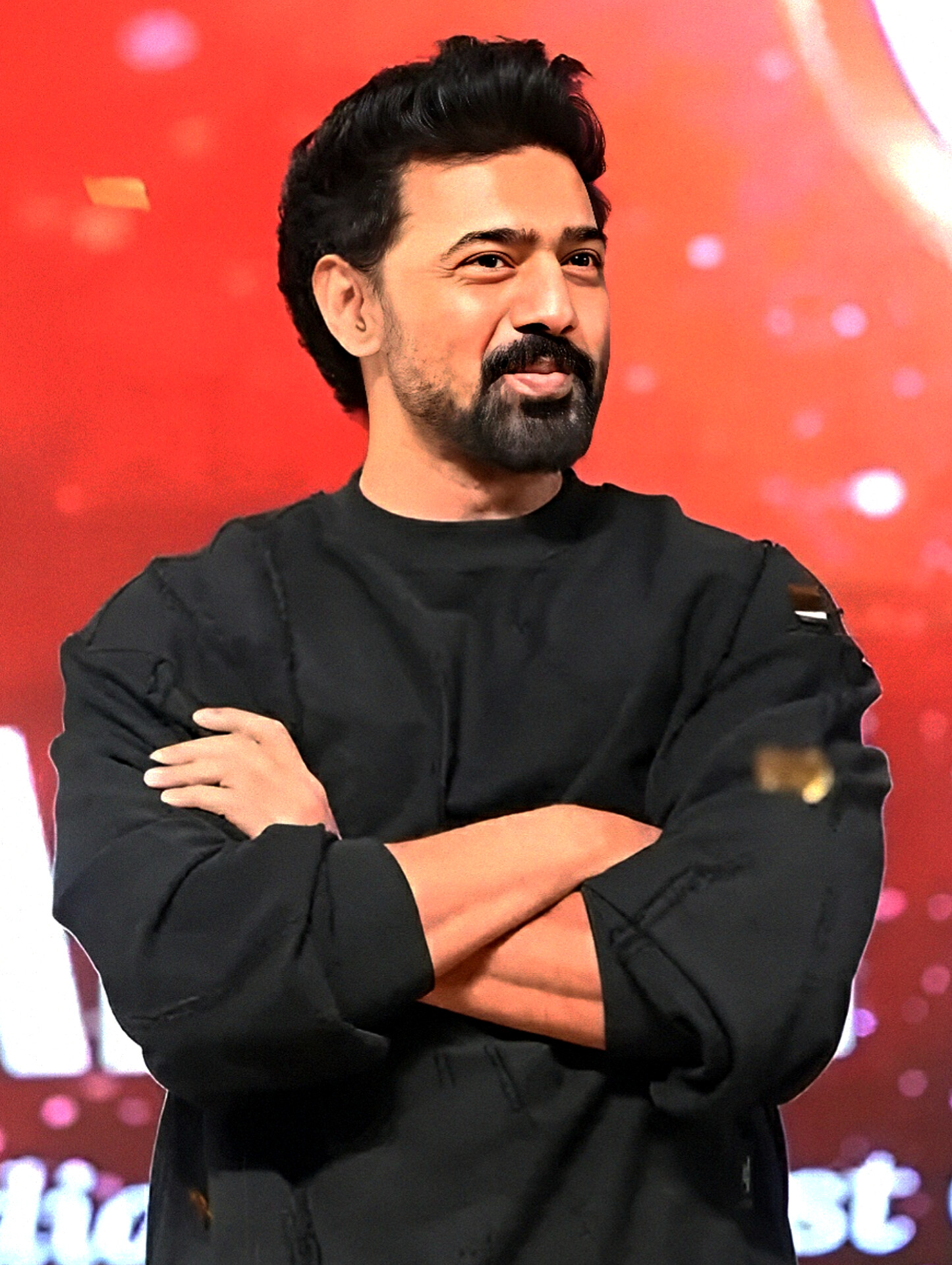
- Dev in 2026

Member of Parliament, Lok Sabha
- Incumbent
- Assumed office 16 May 2014
- Preceded by: Gurudas Dasgupta
- Constituency: Ghatal, West Bengal

Personal details
- Pronunciation: [ˈd̪ipɔk ˈodʱikaɾi]; [ˈd̪eːb]
- Born: Deepak Adhikari; 25 December 1982 (age 43); Keshpur, West Bengal, India
- Other name: Raju
- Occupations: Actor; film writer; producer; politician
- Years active: 2006–present
- Works: Filmography
- Political party: Nationalist Citizens Party of India (2026–present)
- Other political affiliations: Trinamool Congress (till 2026)
- Awards: Full list

Signature
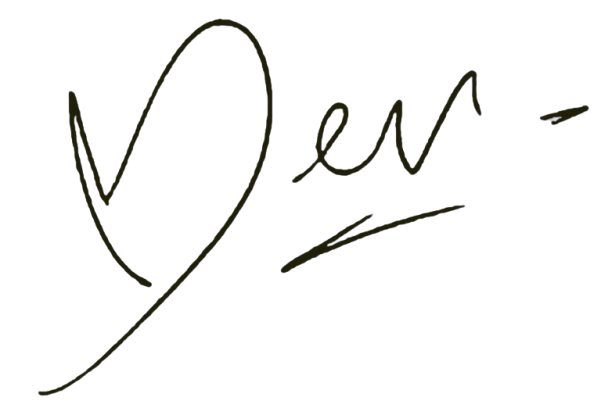

Deepak Adhikari (Note: Bengali: [ˈd̪ipɔk ˈodʱikaɾi].) (Bengali: [ˈd̪ipɔk ˈodʱikaɾi]; born 25 December 1982), known by his stage name Dev, (Note: Bengali: [ˈd̪eːb].) is an Indian actor, producer, singer and screenwriter, known for his works in Bengali cinema and more recently, a politician. Three Time elected MP representing Ghatal (Lok Sabha constituency) since 2014, as a candidate from the All India Trinamool Congress party. He is now representing NCPI due to 2026 Trinamool Congress split

Born in Keshpur, he made his acting debut in the 2006 film Agnishapath opposite Rachna Banerjee. Dev faced flak after the film was released, and it turned out to be a critical and commercial flop. His starring role in I Love You (2007) opposite Payal Sarkar was his breakthrough. Directed by Ravi Kinagi, the film was critically unsuccessful, but was commercially successful and was quick to resurrect his career. Despite the success, Dev did not get any work for the next fourteen months.

He made a comeback on the silver screen with Premer Kahini (2008), opposite Koel Mallick, his first with whom he went on to star with in numerous films. A remake of the 2006 Kannada hit Mungaru Male, the film was moderately successful. Dev got another breakthrough in Challenge (2009) which opened to critical and commercial success. He received the Anandalok Awards for Best Actor and Best Action Hero for his performance in the film.

He continued to gain commercial success and wider attention through his successful films, including Le Chakka (2010), Dui Prithibi (2010), Paglu (2011), Challenge 2 (2012), Khoka 420 (2013), Rangbaaz (2013), Chander Pahar (2013), Zulfiqar (2016) and Amazon Obhijaan (2017). Amazon Obhijaan went on to become the highest-grossing Bengali film of all time. Post its success, he has starred in a number of critically and commercially successful ventures like Tonic (2021), Projapoti (2022), Bagha Jatin (2023), Pradhan (2023) and many others.

He had been a recipient of numerous awards, namely Tele Cine Awards, Kalakar Awards, Filmfare Awards East (2017) and NABC International Bangla Film Award 2017. His accomplishments have made him one of the highest paid and sought out actors of Bengali cinema. Though he has delivered some critically acclaimed performances, Dev is often trolled for his poor accent and average acting skills.

Dev had also been a mentor on the Bengali dance reality show Dance Bangla Dance, replacing Mithun Chakraborty. In 2014, the Government of West Bengal conferred him the Mahanayak Samman Award.

== Life and background ==
Dev was born on 25 December 1982, in Mahisha, a small village near Keshpur, to Gurupada Adhikari and Mousumi Adhikari. His father used to have a food-catering service and his mother is a housewife. His nickname is Raju. He spent his childhood living with his maternal uncle in Chandrakona and his sister, Deepali. Later in his childhood, he moved to Mumbai and attended Purushottam High School in Bandra. His sister, Deepali Adhikari, was married on 9 August 2015 to Anirban.

He also did an acting course at the Kishore Namit Kapoor Acting Academy. In an interview with The Times of India, Dev recalled that when his school was closed for summer, he went to the outdoors of Prahaar: The Final Attack with his father, where Nana Patekar was shooting. He described it as more of a family vacation for them and work did not feel like work. As a child, that was the first time he got a taste of cinema. Though that was his first, life continued to be the same for the next couple of years. The family was based in Mumbai and Dev would often accompany his father to the sets of Abbas–Mustan and Prakash Jha, among several others. There were times when his father would keep busy with other things and he had to chip in. Though he could not cook, he would do the groceries and supervise on his father's behalf. He also said there were times when he washed plates and served food. After receiving his Diploma from BV Jawaharlal Nehru Institute Of Technology (Bharati Vidyapeeth) in Pune, in Computer Engineering, Dev returned to Mumbai and started his film career as an observer on the set of Abbas–Mustan's Taarzan: The Wonder Car.

Dev is in a relationship with fellow actress Rukmini Maitra.

== Film career ==
=== 2005–09: Debut, early career ===
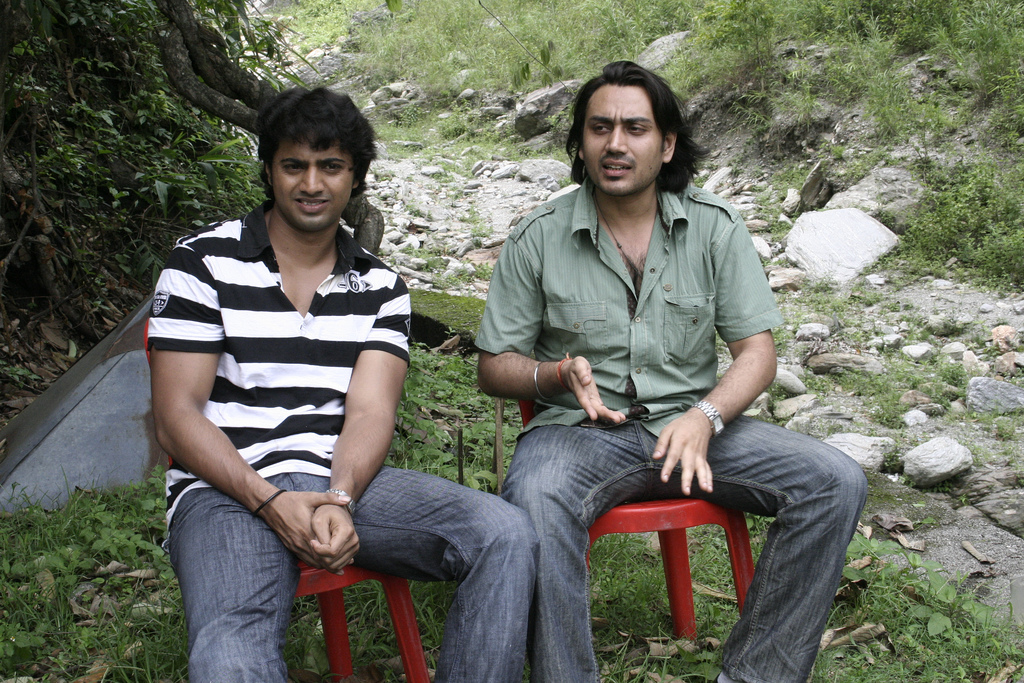
Dev with producer Nispal Singh Rane during shooting of Mon Mane Na

Dev made his acting debut with the 2005 film Agnishapath, directed by Prabir Nandi, opposite Rachana Banerjee. The film did not perform well at the box office. By this point, the film I Love You, directed by Ravi Kinnagi, was in development at Shree Venkatesh Films. Dev met with the producers and gained the male lead role. Despite the financial success of I Love You, Dev did not take on any other roles for about 14 months. He went to Mumbai, and, dedicated to improving himself, learned dance and trained under fight choreographer Aejaz Gulab (of Shootout at Lokhandwala and Mission Istaanbul fame).

=== 2008–10: Comeback and success ===
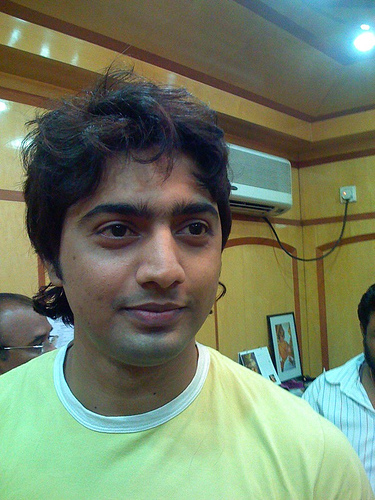
Dev at Shree Venkatesh Films's office in 2010

Dev made a comeback to acting in director Raj Chakraborty's action-romance Challenge, opposite Subhashree Ganguly. The film was a huge hit in West Bengal, giving Dev a considerable popularity boost.

Dev performed item songs like "Pante Tali," and Chirodini Tumi Je Amar. The tracks and videos were very successful. He also performed an additional item number in the film Jackpot, directed by Kaushik Ganguly. The song was a remake of "Jibone Ki Pabona," a track originally performed by Bengali actor Soumitra Chatterjee. Dev appeared as a cameo in Ekti Tarar Khonje directed by Abhik Mukhopadhyay.

In December 2010, Indian romantic Bengali film Shedin Dekha Hoyechilo starring Dev and Srabanti Chatterjee was released, directed by Sujit Mondol and produced by Shree Venkatesh Films. This is the second collaboration between Dev and Sujit Mondol. This movie was one of the biggest hits of 2010. The title track of the movie, being shot in Switzerland, is one of the best romantic songs of Tollywood ever. The chemistry between Dev and Srabanti is so mellifluous that it added a new flavour, which was tremendously appreciated by the audience and critics. The film had an item number by Samidh and Rishi "Khokababu jaye, Lal juto paye", which was the entry song for Dev in the movie. The song's choreographer Baba Yadav said: "Dev has done a great job. There's no doubt that he is an amazing dancer...What I like about Dev is the fact that he enjoys dancing. This shows in his movements." "Khokababu jaye, Lal juto paye" was the costliest song of Tollywood (costing nearly 50-60 million) until the release of Khokababu in January 2012, which contained the costlier item number, "Dance maare Khokababu".

In 2010, Dev received the STAR Ananda Shera notun Protibha Award, at the 2010 Shera Bangali Awards.

=== 2011–2020: Commercial and critical success ===
In June 2011, Dev starred alongside Koel Mallick in Paglu, directed by Rajib Biswas. Produced by Surinder Films, this movie was the highest opener in Tollywood history before Challenge 2 was released in October 2012. Paglu is highest in terms of earning T.R.P on Bengali television till date, having a T.R.P of 12.25 when it was telecast on Star Jalsha. It even left 3 Idiots behind in the T.R.P. battle. As per Sree Venkatesh distribution head, Debasis Sarkar – "Paglu released in 166 theatres across Bengal in the first week. The second week has seen the number of theatres rising to 169. The movie is running in 17 theatres in Kolkata. The gross collections till Monday's (13 June) matinee show have crossed Rs 50 million." The film was a box-office success. This film also introduced martial art in Bengali cinema and Dev as the first martial art hero. The director said – " Dev was superb with the action sequences. He did some martial art stunts and also learnt kickboxing for two months only for my movie. I was amazed with his dedication. Bengali films haven't ever seen such action sequences before. There is a train and a bike chase sequence that was shot by Zoyeb and Dev. I was literally scared when they were shooting this sequence without any body double. Hats off to their courage". In November 2011, his movie Romeo, directed by Sujit Mondol and co-starring Subhashree Ganguly was released was released and earned Dev commendations from all sections of audience and from critics. The movie also saw Dev-Subhashree, the most talked about jodi (pair) of Tollywood and that too after two years. In December, a biography of Dev entitled Aami Dev, was released by Greymind Publications.

In January 2012, Dev starred in Khokababu, the 2nd highest-grossing Tollywood film, once again opposite Subhashree Ganguly. The film, directed by Shankar Aiyya and produced by Ashok Dhanuka Himanshu Dhanuka of Eskay Movies, is the longest running movie of 2012, remaining in theatre for more than 300 days. The film had an item number "Dance Maare Khokababu" which was the costliest song of Tollywood till Challenge 2 released in October 2012, whose title track "Challenge nibi na sala" broke the record to become the costliest song till now made in Tollywood. In 2013, he starred in Khoka 420, Rangbaaz and Chander Pahar. Though the former two films were commercial hits, with Khoka 420 and Rangbazz earning ₹8,000,000 and ₹9,000,000 respectively, the latter gave him a slight decree of critical success. Made on a budget of ₹15,000,000 and shot in South Africa, the film met with critical and commercial success upon release. Dola Mitra of Outlook (magazine) reviewed: "Dev charms as Shankar Choudhury, the young Bengali village boy who dreads clerkdom and wangles a job as station master of a tiny train station in Uganda, where only one train stops in a day." Besides many awards, Dev won the Kalakar Awards for his performance in the film and a Filmfare Awards East nomination. After appearing in two films, one where he gave a special appearance and another critically and commercially unsuccessful film, he gave another critically acclaimed performance in Buno Haansh, the adaptation of Samaresh Majumdar's successful novel of the same name.

In 2015, he appeared in Aparna Sen's action romantic drama film Arshinagar opposite Rittika Sen. Released on Christmas 2015, Dev's performance was critically acclaimed, apart from Jisshu Sengupta and Swagata Mukherjee. Upam Buzarbaruah of The Times of India reviewed: "The high point of the film are the performances. All the actors, including Dev, have performed perfectly." His performance of a mute gangster in the 2016 action drama film Zulfiqar, earned him his second Filmfare Awards East 2017 nomination for Best Actor. Dev's first film of 2017 was Chaamp directed by Raj Chakraborty. The film got critical acclaim from critics and was a commercial success earning above 8.90 crores. His next film of 2017 was Cockpit directed by Kamaleshwar Mukherjee. The film got positive reviews from critics but failed at the Box Office. Dev next starred in Kamaleshwar Mukherjee directed Amazon Obhijaan, a sequel to the 2013 film Chander Pahar. Dev reprised his role as Shankar Rai Chodhury. The film was well received by critics and became the highest grossing Bengali film of all time earning over 48 crores. On 5 January 2018, the film was dubbed and released in five languages: Hindi, Tamil, Telugu, Odia and Assamese. In 2018, he starred in the action thriller films Kabir and Password. Although Password received critical acclaim, the film didn't manage to do well at the box-office. That year in December he starred in Sanjhbati.

=== 2021-present : Family dramas, commercial expansion and continued success ===
After no release in 2020, he starred in two films in 2021. The historical sports drama film Golondaaj directed by Dhrubo Banerjee and produced under the banner of SVF was a blockbuster at box-office. It is based on the life of Nagendra Prasad Sarbadhikari, called as "The Father of Indian football". His second film that year was Tonic. A family drama directed by Avijit Sen, the film received positive reviews and everyone's performance was praised, specially the bonding between Dev and Bandopadhyay. At the 5th Filmfare Awards Bangla, the film received six nominations and won three, including Best Film, Best Actor (Paran Bandopadhyay) and Best Debut Director (Sen). It went on to become the highest-grossing Bengali film of 2021.

In 2022, he starred in Kishmish with Rukmini Maitra. It received good reviews and faired decently at the box-office, earning 2.6 crores. Then he starred in Kacher Manush with Prosenjit Chatterjee and Ishaa Saha. It earned him a nomination for "The Best Actor Award" in 6th Filmfare Award Bangla. In December he starred in Projapoti with Mithun Chakraborty, Mamata Shankar and Koushani Mukherjee in lead roles. It was a huge blockbuster at the box-office, collecting more than 13 crores. It emerged as the highest grossing Bengali film of 2022 and the fifth highest grossing Indian Bengali film of all time. In 2023, he played the titular role of Byomkesh Bakshi in the Birsa Dasgupta directorial detective action thriller Byomkesh O Durgo Rahasya along with Rukmini Maitra and Ambarish Bhattacharya in pivotal roles. His second film in 2023 was the historical biopic Bagha Jatin, which became his first film to be released simultaneously in both Bengali and Hindi. His third film in 2023 was Pradhan. Released on 22 December 2023, the film opened to positive reviews from the critics and emerged as a box-office success. It marked the third collaboration between director Avijit Sen and Dev after the blockbusters Tonic and Projapoti.

In 2024, he starred in the Srijit Mukherji directorial hostage thriller Tekka co-starring Rukmini Maitra and Swastika Mukherjee. His 45th film, it was released in Durga Puja 2024 to mixed reviews from the critics and positive reviews from the audience. In December 2024, he starred in the Soojit Dutta directorial action film titled Khadaan co-starring Jisshu Sengupta, Barkha Bisht and Idhika Paul. It marked his return to the action genre after a few years. It registered the highest first week gross and the highest single day collection for an Indian Bengali film; and emerged as the highest grossing Bengali film of 2024 and the second highest grossing Bengali film of all time. His first release in 2025 was the Kaushik Ganguly directorial Dhumketu. Unreleased since 2016 due to fallout between the producer Rana Sarkar and Dev, it was released on 15 August 2025, after amendments between the two. Grossing over ₹28 crore, it emerged as the second highest grossing Bengali film of all time, pushing Khadaan down to the third position. His second film Raghu Dakat was released during Durga Puja 2025, and it became a commercial success. A historical action biopic, it was based on the life of Raghu Dakat. In December 2025, he starred in the Avijit Sen directorial Projapoti 2, which is a sequel to the 2022 film Projapoti.

== Other works ==
=== Television ===
In November 2011, as a special appearance in Raj Chakraborty's serial Sobinoy Nibedon in Sananda TV, with a bevy of beauties wrapped around him, Dev showed his Romeo side, dancing to "Ami Romeo", "Khokababu jaye", "Gal mitthi mitthi bol" and "Paglu thoda sa karle romance". "I wish Naina and Joydeep a very happy married life," Dev later told t2. Again in March 2012, Dev appeared in a holi special show 'Ronger Anandey' at Sananda TV.

In April 2010 and again in December 2011, he entered as a special guest in Mirakkel Akkel Challenger, an Indian Reality Show on Zee Bangla hosted by Mir Afsar Ali and directed by Subhankar Chattopadhyay. He also came as special guest in many shows such as Dadagiri Season 2, Season 4 etc. Dev became the main coach and judge of Dance Bangla Dance in the show's eighth season, replacing Mithun Chakraborty.

In July 2026, Dev became the host of the reality show Dadagiri Unlimited Season 11 by replacing Sourav Ganguly.

=== Stage ===
Dev has given many stage performances and has participated in several concerts. In 2007, he performed in the Bengal Film Journalists' Association (BFJA) awards 2007. In 2009, he performed in ETV bangla prathama in a Bengali TV channel ETV Bangla. He performed in a concert also, Mon Mane Na concert in 2009. Being a terrific dancer, he's also a brilliant stage performer. He also performed in many award functions as in Star Jalsha Entertainment Awards 2009, Star Jalsha Entertainment Awards 2010, Zee Banglar Gourav Samman 2011, Star Jalsha Entertainment Awards 2011, Jaya Hey, Zee Bangalar Gourav Samman 2012.

== Politics ==
Dev won the 2014 Lok Sabha Elections as a Trinamool Congress candidate from Ghatal constituency. He gave his maiden speech in the Lok Sabha after two years of winning the elections, in Bengali language regarding the implementation of Ghatal Master Plan. He was re-elected consecutively from the same constituency in 2019 and 2024.He is longest serving member of parliament from Ghatal.

=== 2026 Rebellion (Merger to NCPI) ===
In June 2026, almost immediately after the massive Trinamool Congress defeat, around 20 MPs of TMC including Yusuf Pathan, Saayoni Ghosh, Shatrughan Sinha, Bapi Halder, Mala Roy, Mitali Bag, Adhikari, Arup Chakraborty, Sharmila Sarkar, Satabdi Roy, Rachna Banerjee, Prasun Banerjee and others, allegedly declared rebellion from their Party, and presented their written wish to join Bhartiya Janata Party. This group was led by Kakoli Ghosh.

Later, on 14 June, 20 MPs, including Adhikari, signed a formal letter declaring their split from Trinamool Congress as to merge with the Nationalist Citizen Party of India (NCPI). They formally submitted the letter to Lok Sabha Speaker Om Birla.

The total strength of TMC in Lok Sabha had been 28, so that a number of 20 MPS made it eligible for splitting from the Party, as per the Indian Defection laws, so as to escape the anti-defection disqualification.

== Special appearances ==
Dev has had special appearances in several films. In 2009, he made a cameo appearance in the item song "Pante tali" of Chirodini Tumi Je Amar directed by Raj Chakraborty and produced by Shree Venkatesh Films. The song was one of the leading chartbuster songs of the year. In the same year, he appeared in an additional item number "Jibone Ki Pabona" in the film Jackpot, directed by Kaushik Ganguly. The song was a cover of a track originally performed by Bengali actor Soumitra Chatterjee.

In 2010, he appeared as himself in Abhik Mukhopadhyay's Ekti Tarar Khonje.

In 2012, Dev made a cameo appearance in Bawali Unlimited, directed by Sujit Mondal.

In 2018, Dev made a cameo appearance as himself in Uma, directed by Srijit Mukherji.

== In the media ==
Dev topped the list Calcutta Times Most Desirable Men in the year 2013. In addition to his films, he also endorses several brands, such as Vivel-ITC Limited, Royal Stag, Shricon TMT Bars, Bakefresh Biscuits, and the television channel Jalsha Movies. He is touted as one of the richest Bengali actors and politicians with assets over ₹ 15,000,000.

Before the 2014 Lok Sabha Elections the Bengali tabloid Ebela asked him if he enjoyed being in the spotlight. He replied: "...it's just like being raped, either you can enjoy or can shout." This comment sparked controversy as being inappropriate and insensitive and led to calls for him to withdraw his candidacy. Thereafter, he apologised for his comments on his official Twitter account.

== Discography ==
=== Film soundtracks ===
Film	Song	Music by	Year	Banner	Ref
Khokababu	"Khoka Chalu Cheez"	Savvy Gupta	2012	Eskay Movies	
Chaamp	"Dekho Dekho Chaamp"	Raftaar	2017	Dev Entertainment Ventures	
