= Fever (disambiguation) =

Fever is an increase in internal body temperature to levels above normal.

Fever or The Fever may also refer to:

== Film ==
- Fever (1942 film), a French film directed by Jean Delannoy
- Fever (1943 film), an Italian film directed by Primo Zeglio
- Fever (1957 film), a Hungarian film directed by Viktor Gertler
- Fever (1981 film), a Polish film
- Fever (1989 film), an Australian-American erotic thriller/comedy
- Fever (1991 film), an American television film starring Armand Assante
- Fever (1999 film), a film directed by Alex Winter
- Fever (2014 film), an Austrian film
- Fever (2016 film), a Bollywood film
- Fever (2022 film), a Chilean-Peruvian-Brazilian family fantasy film directed by Elisa Eliash
- The Fever (2004 film), an adaptation of Wallace Shawn's play (see below)
- The Fever (2005 film), an Italian film by Alessandro D'Alatri
- The Fever (2019 film), a Brazilian film by Maya Da-Rin
- Fedz (working title Fever), a 2013 British crime thriller by Q

== Literature ==
=== Novels ===
- Fever (Thwaites novel), a 1939 novel by F.J. Thwaites
- Fever (Cook novel), a 1982 novel by Robin Cook
- Fever (DeStafano novel), a 2013 novel by Lauren DeStefano
- Fever, a 2013 novel by Mary Beth Keane
- Fever, a 2016 novel by Deon Meyer
- The Fever (novel), a 2014 novel by Megan Abbott

=== Other ===
- A Fever, a poem by John Donne
- Fever (short story collection), a 1965 short story collection by J. M. G. Le Clézio
- Fever (comics), several comics characters or publications, including:
  - Fever, a DC Comics character in the Doom Patrol
  - Fever, a Marvel Comics character in Doom 2099 comics
- Fever Zine, a UK quarterly
- The Fever, a 1990 play by Wallace Shawn, basis for the 2004 film

== Music ==
=== Performers and labels ===
- Fever (band), an American disco trio
- The Fever (band), an American rock band
- The Fevers, a Brazilian rock band
- Fever Records, an American record label

=== Albums ===
- Fever (Black Milk album), 2018
- Fever (Bullet for My Valentine album) or the title song (see below), 2010
- Fever (Kylie Minogue album) or the title song, 2001
- Fever (Ronnie Laws album), 1976
- Fever (Roy Ayers album) or the title song, 1979
- Fever (Sodagreen album) or the title song, 2009
- Fever (mixtape), by Megan Thee Stallion, 2019
- Fever: Legend Live, by Kumi Koda, 2014
- Fever or the title song, by Annabella Lwin, 1986
- Fever, by Balthazar, 2019
- Fever, by Con Funk Shun, 1983
- Fever, by Sleepy Sun, 2010
- Fever or the title song (see below), by Little Willie John, 1955
- Fever or the title song, an EP by Quentin Elias, 2008

=== Songs ===
- "Fever" (Adam Lambert song), 2010
- "Fever" (Aerosmith song), 1993; covered as "The Fever" by Garth Brooks (1995)
- "Fever" (B.Traits song), 2012
- "Fever" (The Black Keys song), 2014
- "Fever" (Bullet for My Valentine song), 2011
- "Fever" (Cascada song), 2009
- "Fever" (Dua Lipa and Angèle song), 2020
- "Fever" (GFriend song), 2019
- "Fever" (Little Willie John song), 1956; covered by Peggy Lee (1958), Madonna (1993), Beyoncé (2010), and many others
- "Fever" (Tone Damli song), 2007
- "The Fever" (Bruce Springsteen song), 1999
- "Fever", by Aldous Harding from Warm Chris, 2022
- "Fever", by Ateez from Zero: Fever Part.1, 2020
- "Fever", by B'z from The Circle, 2005
- "Fever", by Buckshot and Fakemink, 2025
- "Fever", by Bulldog Mansion from Bulldog Mansion, 2000
- "Fever", by Buono! from Sherbet, 2012
- "Fever", by Carly Rae Jepsen from Emotion: Side B, 2016
- "Fever", by Dongkiz, 2019
- "Fever", by Dropgun and Farleon, 2016
- "Fever", by Enhypen, 2021
- "Fever", by Family Force 5 from Dance or Die, 2008
- "Fever", by HALO, 2014
- "Fever", by the Hives from A.K.A. I-D-I-O-T, 1998
- "Fever", by Inna from Hot, 2009
- "Fever", by J. Cole from Might Delete Later, 2024
- "Fever", by J.Y. Park, 2019
- "Fever", by Jeremy Lee, 2023
- "Fever", by Judas Priest from Screaming for Vengeance, 1982
- "Fever", by K.Flay from Life as a Dog, 2014
- "Fever", by Kings of Convenience from Peace or Love, 2021
- "Fever", by Klinik, 1989
- "Fever", by Love and Rockets from Sweet F.A., 1996
- "Fever", by Nas from Magic 3, 2023
- "Fever", by Neko Case from Middle Cyclone, 2009
- "Fever", by Oscar and the Wolf, 2018
- "Fever", by the Osmonds from Love Me for a Reason, 1974
- "Fever", by Preoccupations from Preoccupations, 2016
- "Fever", by Starsailor from Love Is Here, 2001
- "Fever", by Two Door Cinema Club from Gameshow, 2016
- "The Fever", by The Academy Is... from From the Carpet, 2006
- "The Fever (Aye Aye)", by Death Grips from The Money Store, 2012

== Television and radio ==
- The Fever, a 2019 television series starring Jarry Lee
- Fever 104 FM, a radio channel in India

=== Episodes ===
- "Fever" (Black Books)
- "Fever" (Moonlight)
- "Fever" (The Morning Show)
- "Fever" (Queen of Swords)
- "Fever" (Sliders)
- "Fever" (Smallville)
- "The Fever" (Pose)
- "The Fever" (The Twilight Zone)

== Sports ==
- Indiana Fever, a Women's National Basketball Association team
- West Coast Fever, an Australian netball team

== Other ==
- Fever (app), live entertainment ticketing platform

== See also ==
- Fever Fever (disambiguation)
- Feaver, a surname
- Feve (disambiguation)
- FEV (disambiguation)
