= Close the Door =

Close the Door may refer to:

- "Close the Door" (song), by Teddy Pendergrass, 1978
- "Close the Door" (Idlewild song), from Hope Is Important, 1998
- "Close the Door", a 1955 song written by Fred Ebb and Paul Klein; The Stargazers version was a top ten (#6) hit in the UK
- "Close the Door", a song by Bulldog Mansion from Funk
- "Close the Door", a song by Montell Jordan from This Is How We Do It
- "Close the Door", a song by Shinee from Everybody
- Close the Door campaign, an energy conservation campaign in the United Kingdom
