= Masasa Mbangeni =

South African actress

- Born: Masasa Lindiwe Mbangeni; Port Elizabeth, South Africa
- Education: University of Witwatersrand
- Occupation: Actress
- Years active: 2008–present

Masasa Lindiwe Mbangeni is a South African actress. She is best known for her role as Thembeka Shezi in the popular television serial Scandal!.

== Early life and education ==
Masasa Lindiwe Mbangeni was born on in Port Elizabeth, South Africa.

She received the Mandela Rhodes Scholarship to study at the University of Witwatersrand in Johannesburg, where she graduated with a bachelor of arts degree in dramatic arts, specialising in performance and directing.

== Career ==
Mbangeni made guest appearances on two television series: as Eunice on the BBC Television crime drama Silent Witness and as Jackie's personal assistant on the M-Net soapie, Egoli.

She also performed in stage plays at the Johannesburg's Market Theatre: Nogogo, Sundjata, and Amen Corner, directed by James Ngcobo. She also toured Grahamstown Festival of the Arts with the play Oedipus @ Koonu.

In 2013, she joined the cast of popular television serial Scandal! and played the role of Thembeka Shezi. The role became highly popular, but she left the series in 2016.

After Scandal!, she appeared in the season two of thriller television series Thola, telecast on SABC 2. Then she played the role of Celia in the series Harvest. She later returned to the series and then the character was shot dead, making her second exit from the show.

In 2011, she played in the American feature film Machine Gun Preacher.

In 2023, she appears in the role of as Mbali Kaleni in the five-part crime thriller series Devil's Peak, based on Deon Meyer's novel of the same name.

== Other activities ==
Mbangeni took part in the Marie Claire "Naked" campaign in 2015 to raise public awareness about sexual violence against women and children.

== Recognition and awards ==
Mbangeni received two nominations for Best Actress in a TV Soap from the South African Film and Television Awards (SAFTA) in 2014 and 2015 for her role in Scandal!. In 2017, she received a nomination for Best Actress in the inaugural DStv Mzansi Magic Viewers' Choice Award.

== Filmography ==
Year	Film	Role	Genre	Ref.
2008	Silent Witness	Eunice	TV series	
2011	Machine Gun Preacher	Lip-less Woman	Film	
2016	Thola 2		TV series	
2016	Hard Copy	Khanya Langa	TV series	
2013-2016, 2020	Scandal!	Thembeka Shezi Nyathi	TV series	
2017	Harvest	Celia	TV series	
2019	The Republic	Bridget Ranaka	TV series	
2019	The Red Sea Diving Resort	Mother	Film	
2019	The River	Adv Akhona Mayisela	TV series	
2020	Housekeepers	Nomahlubi	TV series	
2020	Legacy	Kwanele Losi	TV series	
2023	I Am All Girls	Thamsanqa	Film	
2023	Devil's Peak	Mbali Kaleni	TV series	
2024	Heart of the Hunter	Maline Mambi	Film	
2025	Bad Influencer	Gorata	TV series	
