= Devil's Peak (novel) =

2007 novel by Deon Meyer

- Author: Deon Meyer
- Original title: Infanta
- Translator: K. L. Seeger
- Language: Afrikaans
- Series: Benny Griessel Mysteries
- Genre: Crime
- Set in: 2004
- Published: 2004
- Publisher: Hodder & Stoughton
- Publication place: South Africa
- English publication date: 2007
- Pages: 409
- ISBN: 978-0-340-82265-4 (Eng. trans.)
- Followed by: Thirteen Hours

Devil's Peak is a detective novel by South African novelist Deon Meyer, first published in Afrikaans under the title Infanta in 2004. The English translation by K. L. Seeger was published under the title Devil's Peak in 2007, and it has since been translated into a number of other languages.

This novel begins a series of seven detective novels featuring Inspector Benny Griessel.

== Plot summary ==
Thobela Mpayipheli is a former Umkhonto we Sizwe soldier and KGB assassin, who hangs up his boots to take care of his adopted son Pakamile. When Pakamile is killed in a random shooting by armed robbers, Thobela has only one thing on his mind: to do justice and hunt down child abusers across the country. He becomes a vigilante. Inspector Griessel, an alcoholic, takes charge of the investigation but he must also deal with his family problems. Intertwined with this is the story of Christine, a prostitute who becomes involved with a Colombian drug dealer and fears for her child.

== Adaptations ==
Devil's Peak was adapted as a five-episode TV series for M-Net, with Hilton Pelser starring as Benny Griessel. Written by Matthew Orton in consultation with Meyer, the series was directed by Jozua Malherbe and filmed in Cape Town. It also stars Shamilla Miller, Sisanda Henna, Gérard Rudolf, Masasa Mbangeni, and others. The series aired on M-Net from 29 October 2023, with BBC Studios handling international distribution rights.
