= Jazz Age Lawn Party =

1920s-themed event in New York City

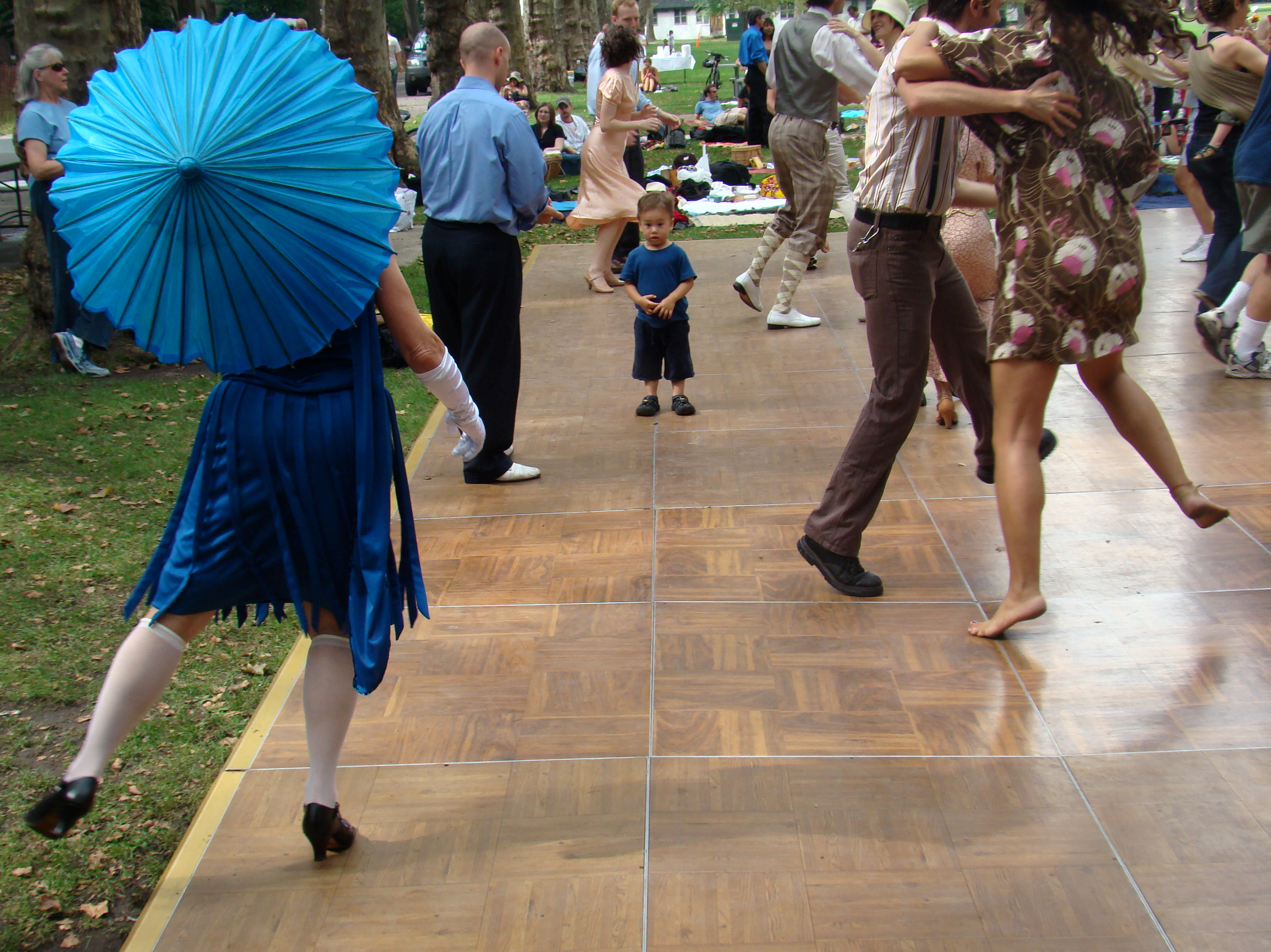

The Jazz Age Lawn Party is a 1920s themed party in New York City that was started by Michael Arenella & His Dreamland Orchestra in 2005. People come dressed in 1920's clothing to listen and dance to period music performed by Mr. Arenella and his Orchestra. There are live dance performances and lessons, as well as activities such as the Tintype photograph, and booths selling clothing from the period. The party grew rapidly after the original party in 2005.

The party takes place every summer at Governors Island in New York City on Colonels Row; the island is accessible through Manhattan and Brooklyn by Ferry only. Tickets are available to purchase with the Fever App and Website; tickets must be purchased before the event and are non-refundable. Children under 12 years old are allowed in without a ticket as long as they are with an adult.

== Founder ==
Michael Arenella is from Georgia and music has been a large part of his life, he began singing in his church choir and soon followed into studying music. Arenella has always been drawn to the past, leading his interest in music to follow jazz backgrounds and popular music from the 1920s. In his adult life, Arenella became a composer and began making his own music in the style of that specific period. He moved to New York and shared his music with the city through the subways and slowly the Dreamland Orchestra came to be. The Orchestra keeps to the period, playing and dressing as if they were in the 20s, with the goal of expressing the importance of joy that their music contains.

== Activities ==
Through the years there have been booths and activities that have stayed popular during the event, these include Paper Moon photo booths, Tintype photo booths, Radeberger Pilsners, beer and cocktail bars, Bigelow's Rose Lounge, Croquet, Pop up barber shops hosted by Proraso, 1920's Motorcar exhibitions, Carnival Games, Vintage clothing booths, Food trucks, sweet treats, dance lessons that include the Charleston and the Peabody, and the Dreamland General Store.

=== Attire ===
On their way to the party, 2017

The event is styled through the 1920s prohibition era, meaning the fashion at the time emphasizing bow ties, pearls, flapper dresses, linen outfits, straw hats, Pinstripes, Suspenders and Bedazzled headpieces. People come from far and wide with period based clothing, makeup, and accessories. The event invites but does not require individuals to dress up, and some individuals go all out.

=== Performers ===
Through the 20 years the event has gone on, performers that have come and gone, and some have been attending and performing since the start. Some of the performers include Michael Arenella and his Dreamland Orchestra, Roddy Caravella and The Canarsie Wobblers, Gretchen Fenston, Peter Mintun, Ziegfeld, Gelber & Manning Band, Queen Esther, Charlie Roman Casteluzzo, and the Dreamland Follies.

== History ==
=== 2005 ===
In 2005, Governors island opened to the public for the first time, hosting the Jazz Age Lawn Party's first event.

=== 2006-2009 ===
The Jazz Age lawn party grew through the years 2006–2009, the event happened every year at Governors island but there isn't much documentation of the parties.

=== 2010 ===
In the 2010s Jazz Age Lawn Party took place in August and was filled with dancing, live music, costumes, motorcar events and vintage booths.

=== 2013 ===
During the 8th year of the event, the Jazz Age Lawn party took place on June 15 and 16 of 2013. Performers, music, and 1920s themed booths and drinks were offered throughout the weekend. The tickets were available before the event through the Michael Arenella's Dreamland Orchestras website.

=== 2014 ===
The 9th annual Jazz Age Lawn party happened at Governors island the weekend of June 14 and 15 of 2014, fully sponsored by the founder of the event Michael Arenella. Over 10,000 people attended dressed fully in period based clothing. They participated in dancing, live music, and activities throughout the two days.

=== 2015 ===
The 10th annual event at Governors island was filled with costumes, dance, and music. Over 20,000 participants faced the rainy weather in their 1920s style clothes with their picnic blankets.

=== 2016 ===
By the time of the 12th annual Jazz Age Lawn Party at Governors island, the event was growing to be a popular New York City Summer activity for travelers. So much so that West House Hotel located at West 55th street added it to their website on June, 06 2016.

=== 2018 ===
During the 14th annual event in early August 2018, the Roxy Hotel in NYC. credited the Jazz Age Lawn Party and an-experience to do in NYC. The article discussed the events activities, music, as well as the attire and costume that people dress in during the event. Proraso barer was also a 1920s themed booth that sold fresh shaves to the people attending the event. Michael Arenella and his Dreamland orchestra performed as well as many other musicians and dancers.

=== 2019 ===
The 15th annual event took place at Governors island in mid-August, the event was filled with performers, music, vintage Polaroid photography was taken as well as Proraso which is a 1920s themed barber shop where full face shaves were available for purchase right in the middle of the events.

=== 2020 ===
There was no Jazz Age Lawn Party in 2020 due to the COVID-19 Pandemic.

=== 2021 ===
The party took place on August 14 and 15, 2021 for its 15th year. Live music, drinks, and period based activities will be live during the event. Throughout the weekend, you could participate in Croquet, dance the Peabody and Charleston to Michael Arenella and the Dreamland Orchestra followed by other musicians. A motor car exhibition showed off the 1920s antique cars accompanied with games, prizes, and booths selling period based clothing and accessories. COVID-19 restriction consists of proof of the COVID-19 vaccine as well as a negative COVID-19 test that matches their legal ID. Hand sanitizer was accessible throughout the event.

=== 2022 ===
The 16th annual event took place on June 11 and 12 of 2022. General admission tickets sold out quickly, at $50 to $60 a person on the Fever app. Performers such as Queen Esther, Michael Arenella and his Dreamland Orchestra were a part of the event. As well as motorcars and dance lessons.

=== 2023 ===
The 19th annual event took place at Governors island in 2023, as the community began to grow, so did the activities. Tintypes and pie contests happened during this event. The New York Times attended and began asking people if they could go back in time would they. Many said they love the dress and life but wouldn't want the world to go back to that time.

=== 2024 ===
The 2024 party happened on June 8–9 and August 10–11, 2024 from 11a.m - 5 p.m, the entertainment included Michael Arenella & His Dreamland Orchestra, Ziegfeld, Peter Mintun on the piano, Gelber & Manning band, Ziegfeld, with dancers Roddy Caravella and The Canarsie Wobblers showing the Charleston. Special events through the weekends involved the Children's Parade starting at the main stage Sunday at 3 p.m, the Bathing Beauties and Beaus Promenade, The High Court Pie eating contest on Sunday, a Charleston lesson with Roddy Caravella followed by a contest on Saturday, and a Peabody dance lesson hosted on Sunday.
