= Feaver =

Feaver is a surname. It is an English surname of Norman French origin, and is an anglicisation of Lefebvre, meaning "smith". Notable people with the surname include:

- Douglas Feaver (1914–97), Anglican bishop
- John Feaver (born 1952), British tennis player
- Peter Feaver (born 1961), American professor of political science
- Samuel Russell Feaver (1878–1946), New Zealand farmer, pharmacist, veterinary surgeon and photographer
- Vicki Feaver (born 1943), English poet

== See also ==
- Fever (disambiguation)
