= Sisanda Henna =

South African actor, producer & filmmaker

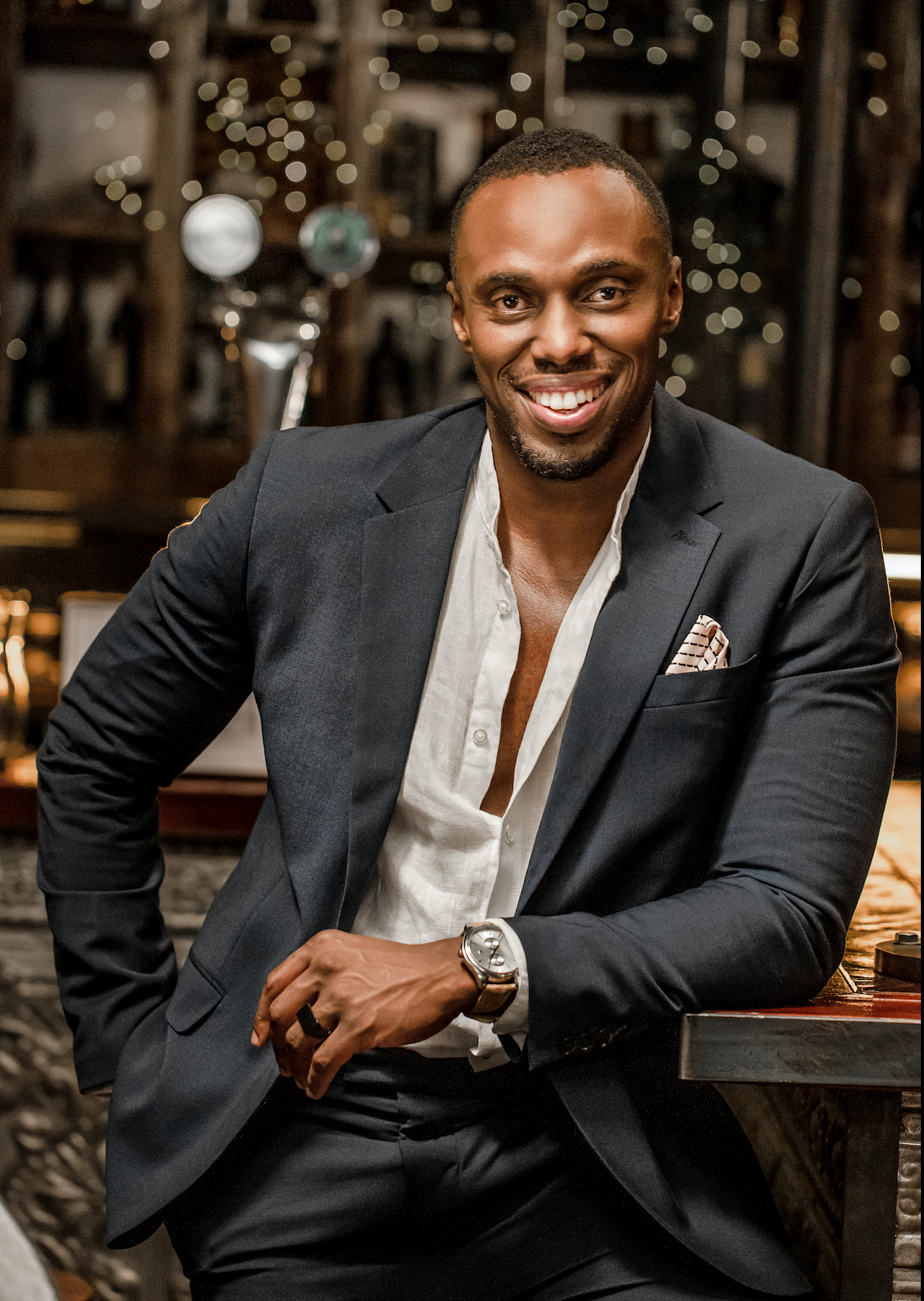
- Born: 18 March 1982 (age 44); Bisho, Eastern Cape, South Africa
- Occupations: producer; director; actor
- Years active: 2003 - Present
- Known for: Devil's Peak
- Notable work: One Night KwaMxolisi; Heart of the Hunter; Inconceivable
- Website: sisandahenna.co.za

Sisanda Henna (born 18 March 1982) is a South African film producer, director, and actor.

== Early life and education ==
Sisanda Henna was born on 18 March 1982 in Bisho, Eastern Cape, South Africa.

He later trained as a story and script editor at Masters level through the South African National Film Video Foundation (NFVF). He completed the International Financing program offered by the NFVF.

== Career ==
=== Acting ===
Henna's acting career started on South African screens in 2003, with the TV series Tsha Tsha. He played Sandile in the SABC 1 series, which aired from 2003 to 2006.

In 2007 he moved to Los Angeles to pursue work in Hollywood.

Henna starred as Sisansa Nkosi in the M-Net series Inconceivable in 2020, opposite Refilwe Madumo. He also had roles in One Night KwaMxolisi and Heart of the Hunter, and played one of the main characters in the 2023 TV series Devil's Peak, based on the 2004 novel of the same name by Deon Meyer.

=== Filmmaking ===
Henna has been working in production since 2003. As a runner, PA, co-ordinator, assistant director, and then producer, he worked on many projects, including working as a trainee producer under Genevieve Hofmeyr on Clint Eastwood's Invictus.

His directorial debut was a commercial for the South African Department of Roads in 2010.

== Other activities ==
In Los Angeles, Henna worked at the Pan African Film & Arts Festival, assisting the festival director with a variety of things.

He is also a speaker, who is invited to speak at many events and gatherings.

== Awards and nominations ==
In 2004 Henna won the Duku Duku Award for best actor, for his role as Sandile in Tsha Tsha.

== Filmography ==
=== Acting ===
- Tsha Tsha as Sandile (2003–2006)
- This Life as Jabu (2004)
- Einmal so wie ich will as Tobi (2005)
- Klein Karoo as Bongi (2013)
- Donkerland as Mtonga (2013)
- Hustle as Moruti Samson (2016)
- Emjindini (2018)
- Rogue (2020)
- Trackers (TV Series) as Nkunzi Shabangu (2020)
- Devil's Peak (2023)

=== Filmmaking ===
- Invictus as a staff assistant (2009)
- Gauteng Maboneng as a series producer (2011)
- Intersexions as a director (2013)
- Gold Diggers as a director (2015)
- Greed & Desire as a director (2016)

=== Other media ===
- Far Cry 2 (video game), voice-over for Sisandra Henna (2008)
