= Van Gogh immersive experience =

Type of art exhibit

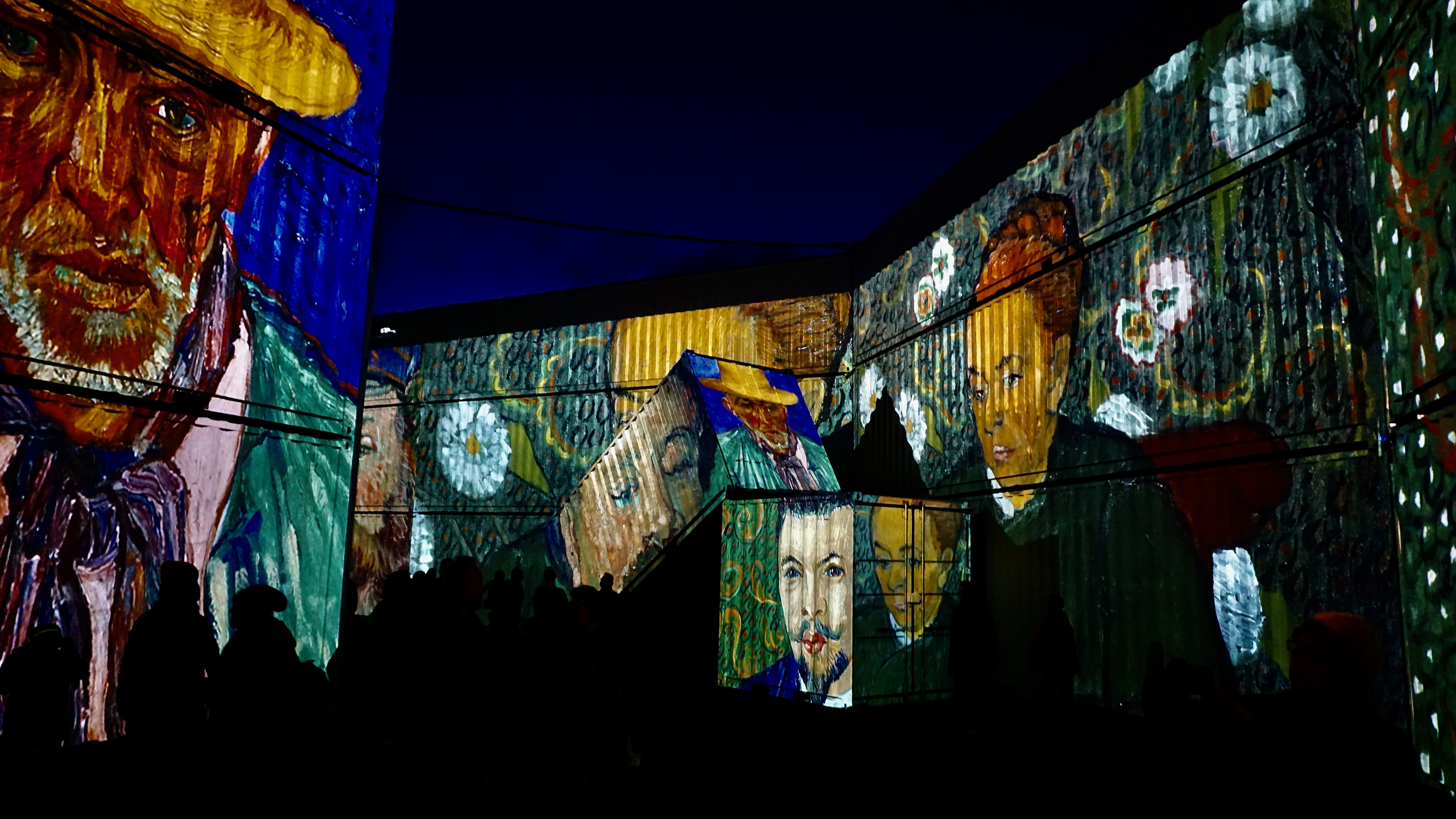
"Van Gogh Alive" exhibit in Wellington, New Zealand in 2021

A number of real-life and virtual reality exhibits of Vincent van Gogh's paintings have been staged around the world since the 2000s. The for-profit events range across venues, organizers, and locations, though the majority have been held in North America in 2021 and 2022. The events are typically set up in large gallery spaces. Images or videos of the artist's works are projected onto walls, ceilings, and floors, sometimes accompanied by animations, narrations, music, or fragrances.

The events have received varying degrees of criticism, including over ticket providers, confusion over similar event names, and over artistic licenses taken with van Gogh's paintings.

== Events ==
Video of a "Van Gogh Alive" exhibit

The immersive events have been held in North America, Europe, Asia, and the Middle East. Events held in the United States include "Imagine Van Gogh: The Immersive Exhibition", the "Immersive Van Gogh Exhibit", "Van Gogh: The Immersive Experience", "Van Gogh Alive", and "Beyond Van Gogh". These events drew complaints over their similar naming, which lead customers to accidentally purchase tickets to the wrong event. The for-profit shows range in price from $25 to US$75 per adult.

Numerous van Gogh events are being held in mid- to large-size U.S. cities, including Atlanta, Chicago, Columbus, Houston, Indianapolis, Los Angeles, Phoenix, San Francisco, Seattle, St. Petersburg, Philadelphia and Charlotte. Larger cities like Boston, Dallas, Miami, and New York City have multiple shows through multiple vendors; there are about six total. Museums in Columbus, Dallas, Houston, and Santa Barbara are hosting unaffiliated traditional exhibits of van Gogh's works, running over similar periods to the immersive exhibitions.

Most of these experiences involve visitors moving through multiple rooms, with walls, and occasionally floors or ceilings, covered in moving projections of Van Gogh's works. The projections include sketches, drawings, and paintings, presented in a 360-degree, floor-to-ceiling digital format. The works are typically accompanied by music set to pair with them. Some exhibits also use sensory tools like aromas of cedar, cypress, lemon, or nutmeg to help visitors feel more immersed with the works. Some events involve virtual reality headsets that take visitors through the artist's experiences.

The original show, "Imagine Van Gogh: The Immersive Exhibition", shows works from the artist's last two years living. There is separately in New York "Van Gogh: The Immersive Exhibition". The "Immersive Van Gogh Exhibit", designed by Massimiliano Siccardi, is adapted for each space it is exhibited in. The show tells van Gogh's story with a loose stream of consciousness, using large images and animations to demonstrate what "flashed before his eyes" before the artist died.

== History ==
The first immersive experiences of Van Gogh's art took place in Europe in the 2000s. Other artists have also been featured in similar shows, including Picasso and Monet, though Van Gogh's popularity makes his shows the most successful. The first showing, in 2008, was titled "Imagine Van Gogh: The Immersive Exhibition". The exhibit was created by Annabelle Mauger, who built off a model her husband's grandfather created, known as "Image Totale".

Showings in the United States gained traction following the 2020 Netflix series Emily in Paris. The show depicts a Van Gogh-themed experience in Paris. Nevertheless, the magazine Boston expressed that there doesn't seem to be a distinct reason behind the mass of immersive events.

Most of the 2021–22 showings had to comply with COVID-19-related regulations, including enforcing mask-wearing and social distancing. Some of these shows were rescheduled due to outbreaks of the virus, and at least one event was modified to be viewed from inside visitors' vehicles. The pandemic has been suggested as another reason for the high frequency and popularity of immersive shows in 2021–22, given that many visitors may have been kept inside during COVID-19 lockdowns.

On July 27, 2023, however, the operator of the immersive shows, Lighthouse Immersive, filed for bankruptcy in Canada and Chapter 15 bankruptcy in the US. Lighthouse Immersive will reduce its operations to four or five venues by the end of September 2023.

In 2025, the exhibition will be installed from January 21, 2025, in Villeurbanne, France.

== Reception ==
C. Shaw Smith, art professor at Davidson College, expressed that the exhibits are more about presentation and spectacle than about the art itself. The exhibits also do not generally show the artist's brushstrokes (a key element of his artistry), especially as the originals have a depth that is imperceptible from a projector image. He noted that the exhibits may displease purists as some simulations animate the paintings, taking creative licenses beyond what van Gogh intended for his art. Smith also recognized that the exhibits popularize the works, bringing them to a larger audience.

In March 2021, the Better Business Bureau warned the public about confusion over the van Gogh events, given the different events taking place around the same time and issues with ticket provider Fever. The ticketing company received about 200 complaints by that time, many of which were due to their policy against giving refunds.
