= Dead at Daybreak =

Crime novel written by Deon Meyer

Dead at daybreak
- Author: Deon Meyer
- Original title: Orion
- Translator: Madeleine van Biljon
- Language: Afrikaans
- Genre: Crime/Thriller fiction
- Set in: South Africa
- Publisher: Hodder & Stoughton
- Publication date: 1998 (2000 in English)
- Publication place: South Africa
- Pages: 400
- ISBN: 9781848947849
- Preceded by: Dead Before Dying
- Followed by: Heart of the Hunter

Dead at Daybreak is the second crime novel written by South African thriller novelist, Deon Meyer. Its Afrikaans title is Orion, and it has been translated into English by Madeleine van Biljon.

With this popular thriller the author incorporates the history of the apartheid system, and politics, that is interconnected in South Africa but found in Angola.

This book won a coveted international prize, the France’s Prix Mystère de la critique. It has also been the basis of Orion, a series for television.

== Plot summary ==
Zatopek 'Zet' van Heerden, an Afrikaner former cop, is a private detective. He is appointed by the lawyer Hope Beneke to find in less than 7 days a testament bequeathing to the widow Wilna van As the fortune of her husband, Johannes Jacobus Smit. This rich antiquarian was tortured at their home and murdered after the opening of his safe-deposit box and the stealing of its contents. van Heerden discovers that "J. J. Smit" was not the person whose papers he carried, and that someone wants to hide his true identity.

The plot alternates between the chapters written in the third person and describing the step-by-step investigations, and those written in the first person and detailing the history of the personal life of Zet van Heerden. This character is like a vindicator showing us that no one holds a single truth, and that coexistence with former enemies is difficult.

In parallel, the reader discovers the life of Thobela Mpayipheli, a member of Umkhonto we Sizwe — the armed wing of African National Congress — sent to the former Soviet Union and East Germany to be trained as an assassin.

== Quotation ==
In a dialogue with Hope (Beneke), a sentence summarizes how between Zet (van Heerden), the main character, oscillates between positive and negative feelings.

'My mother is an artist. That's her work.' He pointed to the wall. 'She creates beautiful paintings. She looks at the world and she makes it more beautiful on canvas. I think it's her way of distancing herself from the evil that is in all of us.' (Day 4 — Sunday, 9 July).
