= Feve =

Feve or Feves may refer to:

- Fève, a small trinket in a king cake or similar dish
- Ferrocarriles de Vía Estrecha, or Feve, a Spanish railway operator 1965–2012
- Renfe Feve, a subdivision of Spanish railway operator Renfe, 2013–2025
- Fèves, a commune in the Moselle department, Grand Est, France
- Betty Feves (1918–1985), American artist
- La Fève, historical name for the Merhavia kibbutz in Israel
- Fluorinated polyols (FEVE), a raw material to make polyurethane
- Fluoroethylene vinyl ether
- Rivière aux Fèves, an alternate name for the Galena River in Illinois, US

== See also ==
- Fever (disambiguation)
- FEV (disambiguation)
