= The Dark Flood =

2020 novel written by Deon Meyer

- Author: Deon Meyer
- Original title: Donkerdrif
- Translator: K.L. Seegers
- Language: Afrikaans
- Series: Benny Griessel Mysteries
- Genre: Thriller
- Published: 2020
- Publication place: South Africa
- Pages: 416
- Awards: Barry Award Nominee 2023
- ISBN: 978-1529375527
- Preceded by: The Last Hunt
- Followed by: Leo

The Dark Flood is a detective novel written by Deon Meyer as the seventh installment of the Benny Griessel Mysteries Originally published in Afrikaans by Human and Rousseau in 2020, the novel was translated by K.L. Seegers into English and published in the U.S and UK in 2022. It follows two detectives, Benny Griessel and Vaughn Cupido, who are demoted from the elite Hawks unit of the South African Police Service (SAPS) and Sandra Steenberg, a real-estate agent in Stellenbosch, South Africa.

== Plot ==
The novel opens with a cash-in-transit heist which Captains Benny Griesel and Vaughn Cupido are charged to prevent. The operation quickly turns chaotic, and a shootout occurs. Vaughn Cupido defuses a hostage situation and Griessel saves Phila Zamisa from being shot. An illegal firearm is confiscated and sent to Buddy Fick.

Later, Griesel and Cupido face a disciplinary hearing for insubordination concerning events in the previous installment, The Last Hunt. They are demoted to Warrant Officers, put on temporary leave, and reassigned to Laingsburg, South Africa.

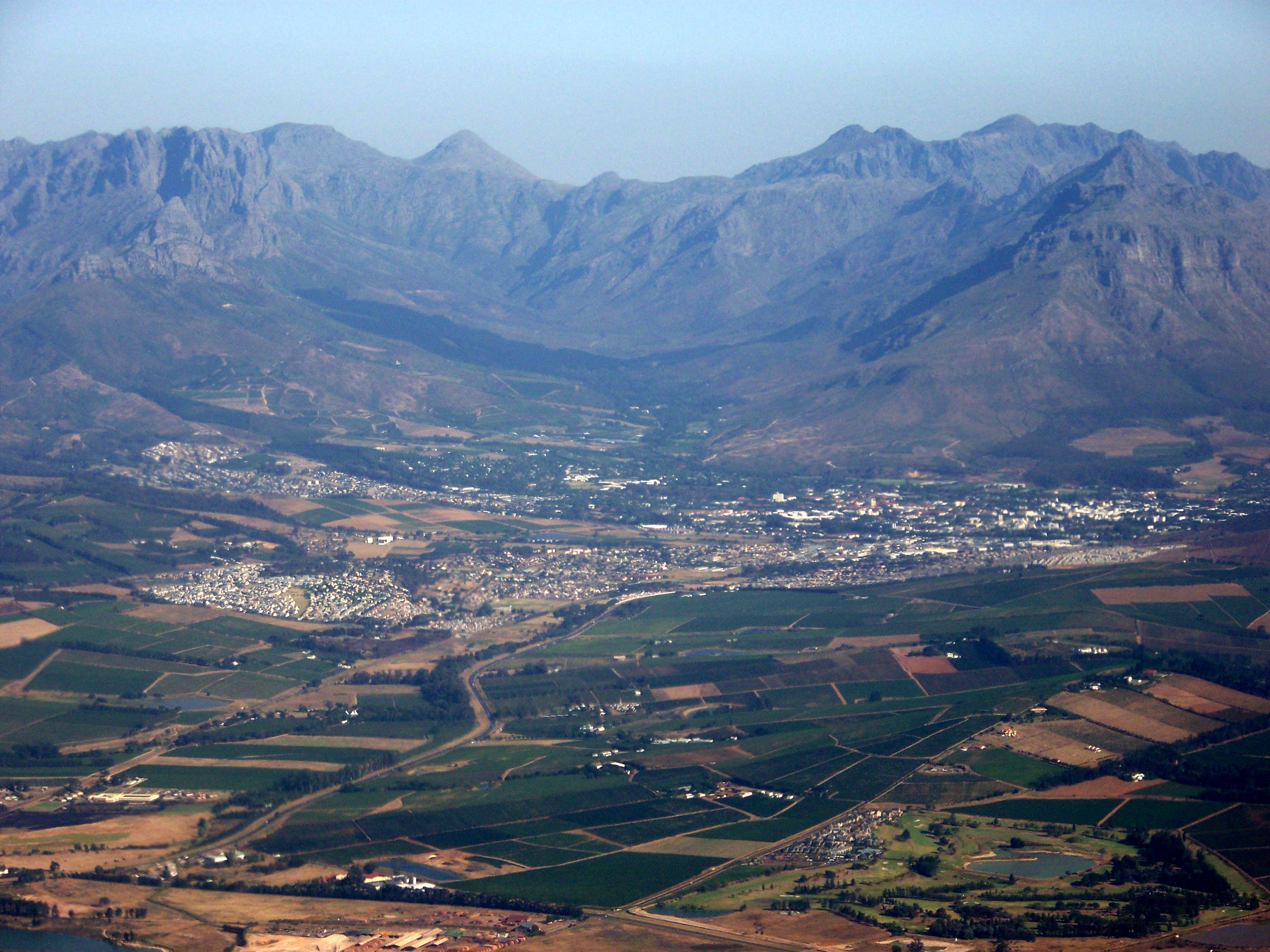
Stellenbosch, Western Cape, South Africa. The valley serves as the setting for Jasper Boonstra's Donkerdrif and the events of The Dark Flood

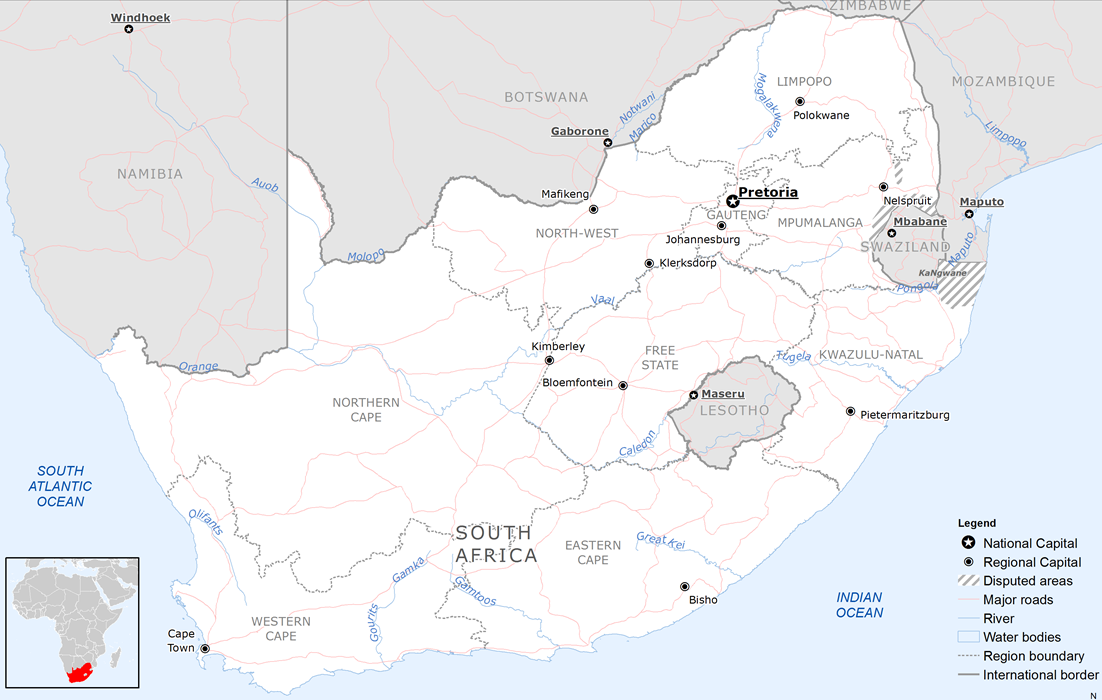
Map of states and major cities in South Africa. The events of The Dark Flood take place in the Western Cape state.

While on leave, Warrant Officers Griesel and Cupido receive several mysterious notes from an unknown source, revealing pictures of General Khaba, a provincial commander, who holds a confiscated illegal weapon, specifically an S & W 500 revolver. A last note requests a meeting at the waterfront. The detectives investigate off-book and Mbali Kaleni supports them.

When they return to work, their new boss is the strict Colonel Witkop Jansen. Captain Rowan Geneke gives them their first assignment, which is a missing persons case for a college student named Calvyn “Callie” Wilhelm de Bruin. They learn that Callie was interested in hacking and that someone in a hoodie entered his apartment using his student ID after he went missing. The detectives also learn that his hard drive his missing.

Their best lead is Roland “The Rolster” Parker, the only “friend” Callie has been seen with by witnesses. They question him several times at his house in Cloetesville, with few results. They later learn that Parker was a cat burglar and that, rather than making mundane Droppa deliveries for Callie as stated, Parker had helped Callie procure and sell illegal items. Callie scouted Parker by hacking the police Krim system and clearing his criminal record. They find footage of Parker selling a Krugerrand, illegally obtained (Callie located by hacking and Parker procured), to a pawn shop. They also discover Callie's considerable hidden assets at Capitec Bank, separate from his FNB account.

At a secret meeting with Chriselda Plaatjies, Milo April's fiancé, the detective duo and Mbali Kaleni learn that April was killed because he discovered that corrupt officers were selling illegal, confiscated weapons to gangs.

Simultaneously, a subplot occurs throughout the novel involving a real-estate agent, Sandra Steenberg. Her husband Josef is an academic on sabbatical to write a book, and she has two children, Anke and Bianca. She has financial trouble after multi-billionaire Jasper Boonstra's corruption and legal troubles caused a crash in the local economy. Ironically, she begins work to secretly sell one of Boonstra's expensive properties, Donkerdrif, to cure this problem. She faces sexual harassment and innuendo both from Boonstra and her boss, Charlie Benson, throughout this process. She pursues several leads to sell the property, but ultimately finds success through Mareli Volster, a lawyer representing a wealthy client. Right as she is almost finished, she thinks Boonstra touched her rear and pushes him down the stairs of his house, killing him. She panics and hides the body in a property owned by clients. Next door, she sees Callie de Bruin and anonymously tips the police off, holding civic duty over personal preservation.

Griessel investigates Boonstra's death. Boonstra's lawyer, Meinhardt Sarazin, tries to inhibit the investigation while his wife, Lettie, helps Sandra, who she saw commit the crime on camera. Griessel is interrupted when Steenberg tips off the police and joins Cupdio and Phila Zamisa in the operation to rescue Callie. Cupido is shot, not fatally, and Callie is rescued. They learn that he discovered Buddy Fick's illegal selling of police confiscated firearms to gangs, as Milo April did, while he was hacking to locate weapons to sell for high prices to America. He used this information to blackmail Fick instead but was kidnapped and tortured. The man in the hoodie was a gang member who stole the computer hard drive to prevent Callie's data-bomb reveal of the conspiracy, which would have happened regardless. Zamisa stops Griessel from killing Fick. Steenberg's crime is not discovered.

== Main characters ==
- Warrant Officer Benjamin (Benny) Griessel: The main character of the novel. A recovering alcoholic, he struggles against the temptation to drink. He is divorced and has a daughter and son, Fritz, whom he has a strained relationship with and whose film school tuition he is paying.
- Warrant Officer Vaughn Cupido: Benny Griessel's partner. He has a girlfriend whom he met and pursued a relationship with in the previous installment, The Last Hunt. Other characters note that his is loud and is very confident in himself. He has had significant weight gain since the last novel and is trying to lose weight in this novel.
- Lieutenant Colonel Mbali Kaleni: Griessel and Cupido's former boss in the Serious & Violent Crimes Unit. She is also known as “The Flower.” She helps the detectives’ decision to pursue the Milo April incident off-the-book.
- Sandra Steenberg: A Stellenbosch real-estate agent who becomes involved in a secret land deal with entrepreneur Jasper Boonstra.
- Jasper Boonstra: A local, incredibly wealthy and infamous businessman who partakes in underhanded and illegal market practices which have gained him ridicule but as yet no legal repercussions. His numerous sexual harassment scandals and rumored criminal activities would result in the company Schneider-Konig and others from leaving Stellenbosch, thus plunging the economy into disarray.
- Lettie Boonstra: Jasper Boonstra's wife, who is seeking a divorce for his continued unfaithfulness. She has known him since college and is disappointed by his decline, greed, and ego.
- Mareli Volster: A lawyer representing a wealthy American client, Demeter, who sought to, and ultimately purchased the Donkerdrif property.
- Warrant Officer Milo April: Killed in a crash while investigating, off-the-record, the disappearance of guns seized by the SAPS in raids.
- Calvyn (Callie) Wilhelm de Bruin: The missing university student in Stellenbosch. He's known to be reclusive and an excellent programmer. He started fencing stolen goods which earned him illegal money he would use to buy his mother a house.

South Africa's current flag, adopted in 1994

- Annemarie de Bruin: Callie's mother and a single mother. She reported Callie's disappearance to the Stellenbosch police and has a close relationship with her son.
- Roland Parker: Callie's business partner. Known as “Rolster” by his mother and “The Rolster” to others. He stole goods from wealthy homes he installed security systems in. He lives with his mother in Cloetsville, north of Stellenbosch.
- Lieutenant Colonel Phila Zamisa: Lieutenant Colonel of the Borland Task force that resolves the cash-in-transit heist at the beginning of the novel. Griessel saves his life. Was also a part of the council that decided Griessel and Cupido's fate after the events of the Last Hunt. Was involved in the extraction of Callie de Bruin.
- General Mandala Khaba: In the council that decided Griessel and Cupido's fate. He wanted to remove them from the police force based on the events in The Last Hunt.
- Colonel Buddy 'The Flash' Fick: Head of the SAPS Confiscated Firearms Store in Silverton, outside Tshwane. Known for his meticulous, controlling personality, overbearing strictness, and polished uniform. Responsible for the kidnap of Callie de Bruin.
- Lieutenant Colonel Waldemar 'Witkop' Jansen: Griessel and Cupido's boss in Stellenbosch. Known for being “old-school,” he brutally admonishes Griessel & Cupido when they did not have any leads in the Callie de Bruin case.
- Milo April: A police officer who sent mysterious messages to Cupido and Griessel alluding to a police corruption plot he had discovered within the confiscated firearms department of the SAPS. He was murdered before he could reveal what he knew.
- Chriselda Plaatjies: Milo April's fiancé who revealed what he had uncovered but was unable to tell before his death when she agreed to a secret meeting at Mbali Kaleni's house.
- Desiree Coetzee: IT project manager and Cupido's girlfriend he met in the last book. She has a son, Donovan whom Cupido is close with.
- Alexa Barnard: Griessel's girlfriend he met in Alcoholics Anonymous. They recovered together and currently live in Belleville, Western Cape. Griessel busies himself with painting her house as he awaits his assignment after the hearing.
- Fritz Griessel: Griessel's estranged son who is studying film. He is dubious at his father's motivation to become closer to him due to Griessel's alcoholism, resulting in distrust in his father's ability to maintain his sobriety.

== Translations ==
The Dark Flood was originally published in Afrikaans by NB-Uitgewers in 2020 and translated in English by K.L. Seegers in 2021 to be sold in the US and UK. The novel was also translated in German (titled Todstunde) by Aufbau Verlaine and in the Netherlands (titled Donkerdrif) by A.W. Bruna.

The English edition includes a glossary of Afrikaans words in the back due to the many Afrikaans words that were used throughout the novel. Meyers states that he has a translator who does the main translations but he tweaks her work to best convey his meaning. This includes usage of the Afrikaans words to best convey the setting and culture

== Style ==
=== Structure ===
The novel is broken into two main perspectives, with the omniscient narrator divulging events with Sandra Steenberg and the detective duo Griessel and Cupido. Occasionally in the middle and end of the novel, Cupido and Griessel have separate narrations to describe their experiences investigating the Callie de Bruin and Jasper Boonstra cases separately. The two main perspectives changed simultaneously throughout the story, and eventually, Steenberg and the detective duo's stories meet. This is done frequently to either develop suspence, characters, or reveal an unreliable narrator.

=== Genre ===
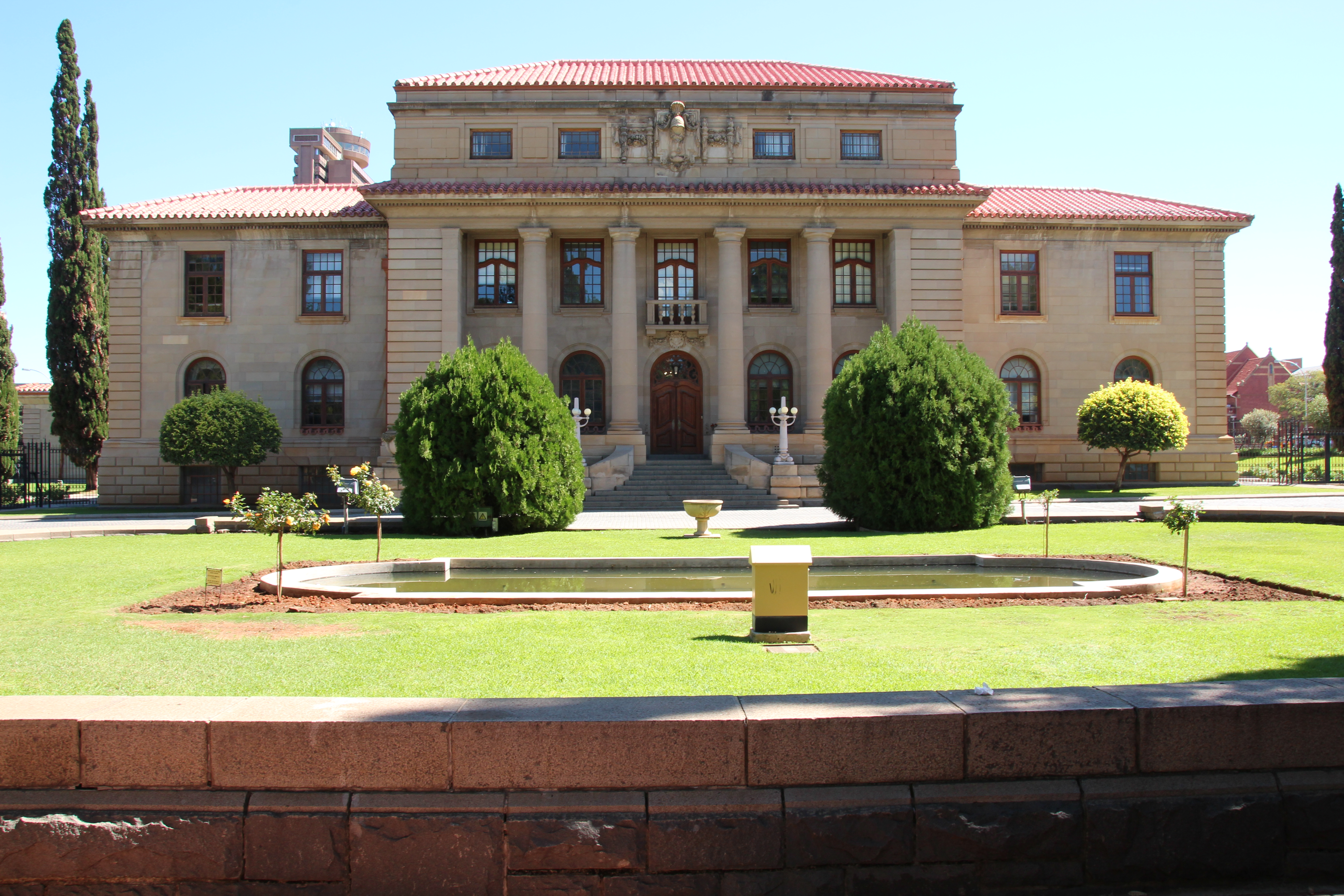
Courthouse in Bloemfontein, South Africa, in the Free State Province

A wide selection of criminal activities, such as theft, cybercrime, and corruption of the state & police are included in The Dark Flood.

The Dark Flood has been classified as a thriller, due to the fast-paced action, and a police procedural due to the intimate focus on police practices during the investigations and the involvement of police tensions into the story. Meyer's portrayal of police officers and their investigation techniques in The Dark Flood and his other novels is described as “outstanding,” characteristic of that genre.

== Themes ==
=== State capture and government corruption ===
State capture is a specific government corruption in which economic influence is wielded by corporations, businesses, or wealthy individuals in order to secure "narrow and selfish" goals through the method of influencing State policies. This issue is thoroughly highlighted in The Dark Flood and is described as "South Africa's systemic political corruption." Systemic corruption occurs when corruption is present on the small scale (petty bribes among low-level officials) and the large scale (large misuse of public funds). The South African democratic state ended some forms of corruption during apartheid and propagated others.

State corruption has produced crashes in local real-estate markets, in reference to Sandra Steenberg's financial troubles and is the reason for Griessel and Cupido's demotion. This is also mentioned several times by Cupido and Griessel themselves over the course of the novel, and Griessel struggles with his quest for justice alongside "state sanctioned crime."

State capture was prevalent under the Jacob Zuma administration in South Africa and remains a problem in the modern day. State capture can manifest in fostering bad governance, politically motivated appointments, seizure of State assets, misuse of government funds, and various other problems, such as the police corruption and politics faced by Cupido and Griessel, which occur.

=== Police corruption ===
South African Police Service (SAPS) emblem

A severe issue that has been noticed around the globe is police corruption. Milo April himself states this in his anonymous note to Griessel that there is "an adder" in the force. This event is important in driving the plot forward. Milo April had learned, as Callie de Bruin did, that police corruption had resulted in officers selling confiscated weapons to gangs. This plotline culminates in the arrest of Buddy Fick and the rescue of Callie de Bruin.

Since the birth of democracy in 1994, police corruption has been a difficult problem to quantify. Generally, South Africa has a history of police corruption with large mistrust of the police force from citizens and even from other members of the SAPS, where many officers believed there was corruption in their own station. Shown in The Dark Flood, there is corruption in all levels of the SAPS, with many high-level officers working with organized gangs.

Although The Dark Flood does not delve into the causes of police corruption, the close bonds between officers and the hierarchy within the police system causes officers to turn their backs on misconduct in case they need a favor later. The motivation by citizens and other police officers is not great enough to bring the crimes into the open due to events that follow (i.e. court cases, mistrust among other officers).

=== Income disparities and financial crisis ===
The income disparity between the residents of Stellenbosch are shown in The Dark Flood. Between 2012 and 2018, the income disparity in Stellenbosch increased dramatically compared to neighboring municipalities. In Stellenbosch, the wealthy live “only a few kilometers away” from impoverished neighborhoods. Meyer himself describes this as “abject poverty” and believes that a majority of crime occurs in poverty-stricken neighborhoods.

The financial crisis in Stellenbosch is akin to the scandal of Steinhoff International by Markus Jooste, whose fraud pocketed people's retirement funds. His rise to wealth and association with foreign companies lead readers to make this comparison.

=== Misogyny, sexual harassment and rape ===
Misogyny and sexual harassment are also explored with the character Sandra Steenberg, who is exposed to sexism on a daily basis from her boss, Charlie Benson, and is harassed by "skirt chaser" Jasper Boonstra with innuendo. In general, workplace sexual harassment has been gaining awareness in recent years, with high numbers of South African men and women reporting sexual harassment in their workplace. Sexual harassment is seen as the sexualization of non-sexual relationships, mostly women with men in authority. This is known as the power-differential interpretation.

The transition into democracy forced these issues into the limelight, especially when crime statistics were posted representing all groups, but sexual harassment and rape have been receiving a growing cyber presence in recent years. Even though South Africa did not experience the #MeToo movement in 2018 to the same extent other advanced economies did, a number of rape cases in 2012 and 2013 in South Africa sparked the discussion of the sex crimes against women, especially the Anene Booysen case in 2013 which happened less than two months after the Jyoti Singh Pandey case that sparked national outrage and protests in India, which in turn, outraged South Africa as well.

Steenberg believed that she was about to be raped before pushing Boonstra down the stairs of his Baronsberg home. High levels of rape are reported that have generally remained unchanged over the years according to official statistics released by the SAPS.

=== Racism and justice ===
This theme is explored through Roland Parker's character, who is a person of color. His unpleasant disposition and his attempt to evade Warrant Officers Cupido and Griessel is partially due to his race and the unfair treatment and prejudice against minorities in the South African society and the justice system.

In a post-apartheid world, whites in South Africa disapprove apartheid while perpetuating internalized superiority against colored people. This percolates into all parts of society, including the justice system.

Under apartheid, there were only a handful of crime novels but afterwards, there is a boom of crime novels and authors. Meyer notes himself that the apartheid system itself is what drove people away from writing novels because this system made people believe that justice did not exist. In his other novels (such as Heart of the Hunter and Dead Before Dying), commentary by Meyer about racism is greater.

=== Alcoholism ===
The Alcoholics Anonymous organization logo

A recurrent theme of alcoholism, how it affects Griessel as a police officer, and its consequences is explored in The Dark Flood Griessel is a recovering alcoholic who has been tenuously maintaining sobriety for a decently long period by the events of The Dark Flood. His relationship with his son, Fritz, has been negatively impacted by this habit and the story explores Griessel's attempts to restore this relationship as the case of a missing college student feels personal in regard to his college-age son. Griessel also met his fiance, Alexa, through a recovery program for alcoholics.

Disproportionately, alcoholism affects police officers compared to the rest of the population, with the stress and trauma of the job along with the social aspect of drinking being contributing factors.

== Critical reception ==
Overall, The Dark Flood was received well by reviewers. Times UK notes that Meyer roots his novels on the socio-political issues of the day and there is no shortage of critique against South African politics, to the point that it is considered “biting.” Despite the serious issues that are brought up, The Dark Flood is still considered humorous by many and delves into personal conflicts and relationships between characters at the same time of the investigations to create a satisfying novel. Meyer's short chapters and frequent uses of nicknames and Afrikaans words interrupt the flow of reading make some lose focus of the general plot. It has been noted that the large cast of characters is confusing at times.

In March 2023, The Dark Flood was nominated for a Barry Award, as best Mystery or Crime Novel of 2023. The winner will be announced in September.
