= FEV =

FEV or Fev may refer to:

== Sport ==
- Brendan Fevola (born 1981), Australian Rules footballer
- Featherstone Rovers, an English rugby league club
- Liga FEV; see Volleyball in Spain

== Other uses ==
- Fidelity European Values, a British investment trust
- Forced Evolutionary Virus, a fictional virus in the Fallout game franchise
- Forced expiratory volume
- Full electric vehicle
- Xiaohu FEV, Chinese electric car

== See also ==
- Fuel cell electric vehicle
- Fever (disambiguation)
- Feve (disambiguation)
