= Fever Fever =

Fever Fever may refer to:

- Fever Fever (album), by Puffy AmiYumi, 1999
- Fever Fever (band), an American Christian rock band
- "Fever Fever", a song by Melody Club from Scream, 2006
- "Fever, Fever", a song by Gizmo Varillas

== See also ==
- Fever (disambiguation)
