= Fever (comics) =

Fever, in comics may refer to:

- Fever (DC Comics), a DC Comics character
- Fever, an Image Comics character who appeared in Freak Force
- Fever, a Marvel Comics character who appeared in Doom 2099

== See also ==
- Fever (disambiguation)
- Fever Pitch (comics), a Marvel Comics supervillain
