= Salon de Musica =

Studio album by Bulldog Mansion
- Released: August 5, 2004
- Genre: Pop rock K-pop
- Length: 52:41
- Label: YBM Seoul Records, Inc. SRCD-3768

Bulldog Mansion chronology
Funk (2002)	Salon de Musica (2004)

Salon de Musica is an album released in 2004 by Korean pop rock band Bulldog Mansion.

== Track listing ==
1. "You'd Expected, but We Are..." – 1:45
2. "Life Is..." – 3:30
3. "사랑은 구라파에서" – 3:10
4. "그녀 이야기" – 3:27
5. "El Disco Amor" – 4:50
6. "O" My Soul" – 3:05
7. "좋아요~" – 2:31
8. "Salon" – 0:55
9. "잘가라 사랑아" – 3:13
10. "Lucha! Amigo" – 3:52
11. "명탐정 차차차" – 2:25
12. "Soul Drive" – 6:35
13. "Summer Rain" – 4:27
14. "The Classic Story of Bulldog Mansion" – 2:17
15. "Closing Time" – 2:18
16. "El Disco Amor (사랑의 디스코 radio edit)" – 4:14
