= Cape Town (TV series) =

TV series based on a novel by Deon Meyer

- Also known as: Mat Joubert
- Genre: Drama; Crime
- Created by: Annette Reeker
- Based on: Dead Before Dying by Deon Meyer
- Written by: Annette Reeker & Mark Needham
- Directed by: Peter Ladkani
- Starring: Trond Espen Seim; Boris Kodjoe; Arnold Vosloo; Marcin Dorociński; Axel Milberg; Jessica Haines; Isolda Dychauk; Jody Abrahams; Ian Roberts; Nandi Horak
- Countries of origin: South Africa, Germany
- Original language: English
- No. of seasons: 1
- No. of episodes: 6

Production
- Producers: Samantha Putter; Adam Friedlander; Boris Kodjoe; Brecht Driesen
- Production companies: all-in-production; Out Of Africa entertainment; Dynamic Television

Original release
- Release: 23 June 2016

Cape Town (also known as Mat Joubert) is a South African-German produced TV-series based on the novel Dead Before Dying by author Deon Meyer. The series is produced by German company all-in-production, whose head Annette Reeker bought rights 5 years before starting the production. Produced without any television channel backing it, Reeker funded the series with private earnings of about 6 million Euro and wrote the episodes on her own, with English writer Mark Needham translating them from German into English. The world premiere of the series was scheduled for June 23, 2016, on Polish channel TVN.

== Plot ==
Cop Mat Joubert is devastated following the murder of his wife, who also worked for the police. He now spends his time drinking and contemplating suicide. When he gets back to work, Mat discovers he has been partnered with a new colleague and has to investigate the murders of several men, all shot with the same German weapon. Meanwhile, elsewhere in Cape Town, young female models are being drugged, raped and murdered.

== Cast and characters ==
- Trond Espen Seim as Mat Joubert
- Boris Kodjoe as Sanctus Snook
- Arnold Vosloo as Robin van Rees
- Marcin Dorociński as Christian Coolidge
- Axel Milberg as Norbert Wernicke
- Jessica Haines as Hanna Nortier
- Isolda Dychauk as Irena Krol
- Jody Abrahams as Bart de Wit
- Ian Roberts as Gerbrand Vos
- Nandi Horak as Rosina Windburg
- Vusi Kunene
