= Bulldog Mansion =

South Korean rock band

- Origin: Seoul, South Korea
- Genres: Pop rock
- Years active: 1999–2004
- Labels: Tubeamp, EIN Media
- Members: Lee Han-Chul (vocals, guitar); Seo Chang-Seok (guitar); Lee Hanjoo (bass guitar); Jo Jeong-Beom (drums)

Bulldog Mansion (Korean: 불독맨션) is a South Korean pop rock band from Seoul formed in 1999. Their name does not translate to "Bulldog Mansion"; rather, it is a phonetic approximation in Hangul, with the English name being used for their website and album art. They are most well known in the English-speaking world for their song, "Happy Birthday to Me" featured in the SamBakZa Flash cartoon "There she is!! Step 2 -- Cake Dance".

== Discography ==
=== Studio albums ===
Title	Album details	Peak chart positions	Sales
Title	Album details	KOR	Sales
Funk	Released: September 17, 2002; Label: Universal; Formats: CD, cassette	37	KOR: 17,540+
Salon de Musica	Released: August 5, 2004; Label: Ain Media; Formats: CD, cassette	21	KOR: 10,276+

=== Extended plays ===
Title	Album details	Peak chart positions	Sales
Title	Album details	KOR	Sales
Debut E.P.	Released: May 10, 2000; Labels: Tube Amp Music; Formats: CD, cassette	—	—
Re-Building	Released: May 16, 2013; Labels: Tube Amp Music, DH Play Entertainment; Formats: CD, digital download	31	—
Tres3	Released: May 29, 2014; Labels: Tube Amp Music, DH Play Entertainment; Formats: CD, digital download	50	—
"—" denotes release did not chart.
