= Soli Philander =

South African actor, presenter and radio personality (1961–2026)

Silamour Philander
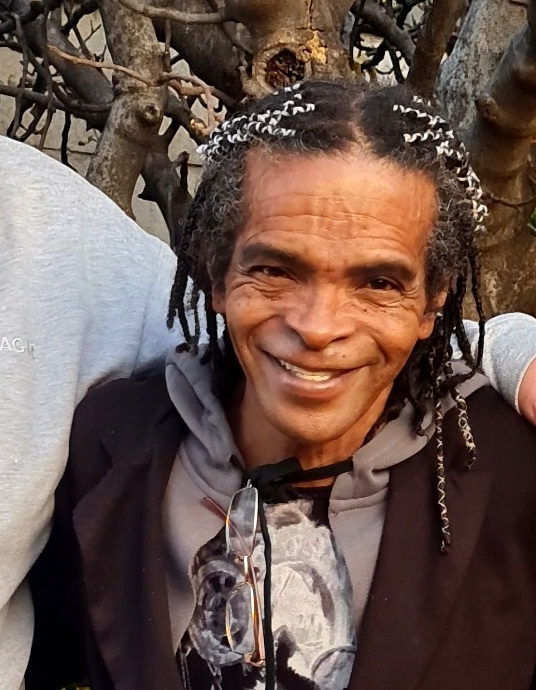
- Philander in 2024
- Born: 19 January 1961; Elsie's River, Cape Flats, Cape Town, South Africa
- Died: 4 March 2026 (aged 65); Cape Town, South Africa
- Occupations: Actor, presenter, radio personality
- Notable work: Are You Smarter than a 5th Grader?, Let's Make a Deal
- Children: 4

Silamour Philander (19 January 1961 – 4 March 2026), professionally known as Soli Philander, was a South African actor, comedian, director, television presenter and radio personality. He is best known for his work in South African media and theater, particularly for his advocacy and performance of "Kaapse" (Cape) culture and the Kaaps dialect.

== Early life ==
Philander was born and raised in Elsie's River on the Cape Flats. His upbringing during the Apartheid era significantly influenced his creative output, which frequently addresses themes of identity, race, and the unique socio-cultural landscape of the Western Cape.

== Career ==
=== Television and films ===
Philander became a household name as the host of several major South African television programs, including the local version of Are You Smarter Than a 5th Grader? and Let's Make a Deal.

Filmography
Year	Title	Role	Notes
1982	Verkeerde Nommer	Thief	Film
1988	Dot en Kie	Jean-Pierre de Kamp	TV series
1991	The Road to Mecca	Kees	Film; Dir. Athol Fugard
1992	Kideo	Timothy Traddle	Children's TV
2000–2008	Liriekeraai	Host	Musical game show
2007	Are You Smarter Than a 5th Grader?	Host	Game show
2008	Let's Make a Deal	Host	Game show
2010	Doen met 'n Miljoen!	Host	Game show
2016	Snaaks Genoeg	Solly	Film
2023	Devil's Peak	Princess	TV series

=== Radio ===
Philander has held major slots on South Africa's leading radio stations, including

- Kfm 94.5
- RSG (Radio Sonder Grense)
- Smile 90.4 FM.

=== Theater ===
A prolific stage performer, Philander's work often promoted the legitimacy of the Kaaps language in literature and performance.

- Waiting for Godot (1980) – Performed at the Baxter Theatre.
- Take Two (1991) – One-man show at The Laager.
- Woeskroes – Writer and performer.
- Nice Coat (Lekker Jas!) (2017) – Performed at the Baxter Theatre.

== Death ==
Philander died of cancer in Cape Town, on 4 March 2026, at the age of 65.

== Awards and recognition ==
In 2019, Philander was honored with the Lifetime Achievement Award at the Fleur du Cap Theatre Awards. The award recognized his four decades of contribution to the South African performing arts and his role in elevating Cape culture.

- Artes Award for Best Television Presenter.
- Fleur du Cap Theatre Award—Lifetime Achievement (2019).
