= Devil's Peak (TV series) =

2023 South African TV crime drama series

- Genre: Crime drama; police procedural
- Created by: Matthew Orton
- Based on: Devil's Peak, by Deon Meyer
- Written by: Matthew Orton and Amy Jephta
- Directed by: Jozua Malherbe
- Theme music composer: Tim Phillips
- Country of origin: South Africa
- Original language: English
- No. of seasons: 1
- No. of episodes: 5

Production
- Producer: Johann Knobel
- Production companies: Lookout Point and Expanded Media Productions

Original release
- Network: M-Net
- Release: 29 October 2023

Devil's Peak is a South African-British crime drama five-part television series based on the novel of the same name by South African author Deon Meyer. It stars Hilton Pelser as troubled detective Benny Griessel, Shamilla Miller as his wife, and Sisanda Henna as a vigilante killer.

== Synopsis ==
After Pakamile, the son of Thobela Mpayipheli, is killed by two young white men from privileged backgrounds and one from a powerful family, he attempts to get justice in the courts. However once his past as a security guard for a gangster has been exposed, it appears that the men will escape conviction, so he decides to exact revenge. This does not come about, but he embarks on a series of attacks on other men who have hurt children, using an assegai. In the meantime, Detective Benny Griessel, while initially working on an unrelated case, gets drawn into the hunt for "the Assegai Killer".

== Cast ==
- Hilton Pelser as detective Benny Griessel
- Shamilla Miller as Anna Griessel
- Sisanda Henna as Thobela Mpayipheli ("the Assegai Killer")
- Tarryn Wyngaard as Christine van Rooyen
- Gérard Rudolf as Boef Beukes
- Masasa Mbangeni as Mbali Kaleni
- Soli Philander as Princess
- Litha Bam as Themba Genge
- Tshamano Sebe as Madison Madikiza
- Lee Roodt as Enver Davids
- Mpilo May as Detective Jaimie Keyter
- Faith Baloyi as Ntsusa ka Mlawu
- Dawid Minnaar as Eugene de Klerk
- Michele Burgers as Nicola
- Brendan Sean Murray as Detective Cruywagen

== Production ==
The series was co-written by Matthew Orton and Amy Jephta, who also serves as associate producer, and directed by Jozua Malherbe. Orton wrote the script in consultation with Meyer, updating the storyline and characters to better reflect contemporary reality. It was filmed in Cape Town and surrounds. Devil's Peak is the name of the mountain peak next to Table Mountain, behind the city centre.

Johann Knobel is producer of the series. British production company Lookout Point, in collaboration with Expanded Media Productions, are responsible for production of the series. Orton, along with Laura Lankester from Lookout Point and Francis Hopkinson from Expanded Media are executive producers, with M-Net's Yolisa Phahle, Allan Sperling, and Jan du Plessis also acting as executive producers.

== Release ==
Devil's Peak had red carpet premiere on 5 October 2023 at the Nasdak rooftop venue in Cape Town, before the five-part series started airing on M-Net from 29 October 2023. BBC Studios has international distribution rights.

American streaming service Tubi acquired North American broadcasting rights, with the series premiering there on 15 January 2024. It also became available on BBC Player in January 2024, and Australian streaming service Stan from 24 July 2024.
