= Sodagreen =

Taiwanese band

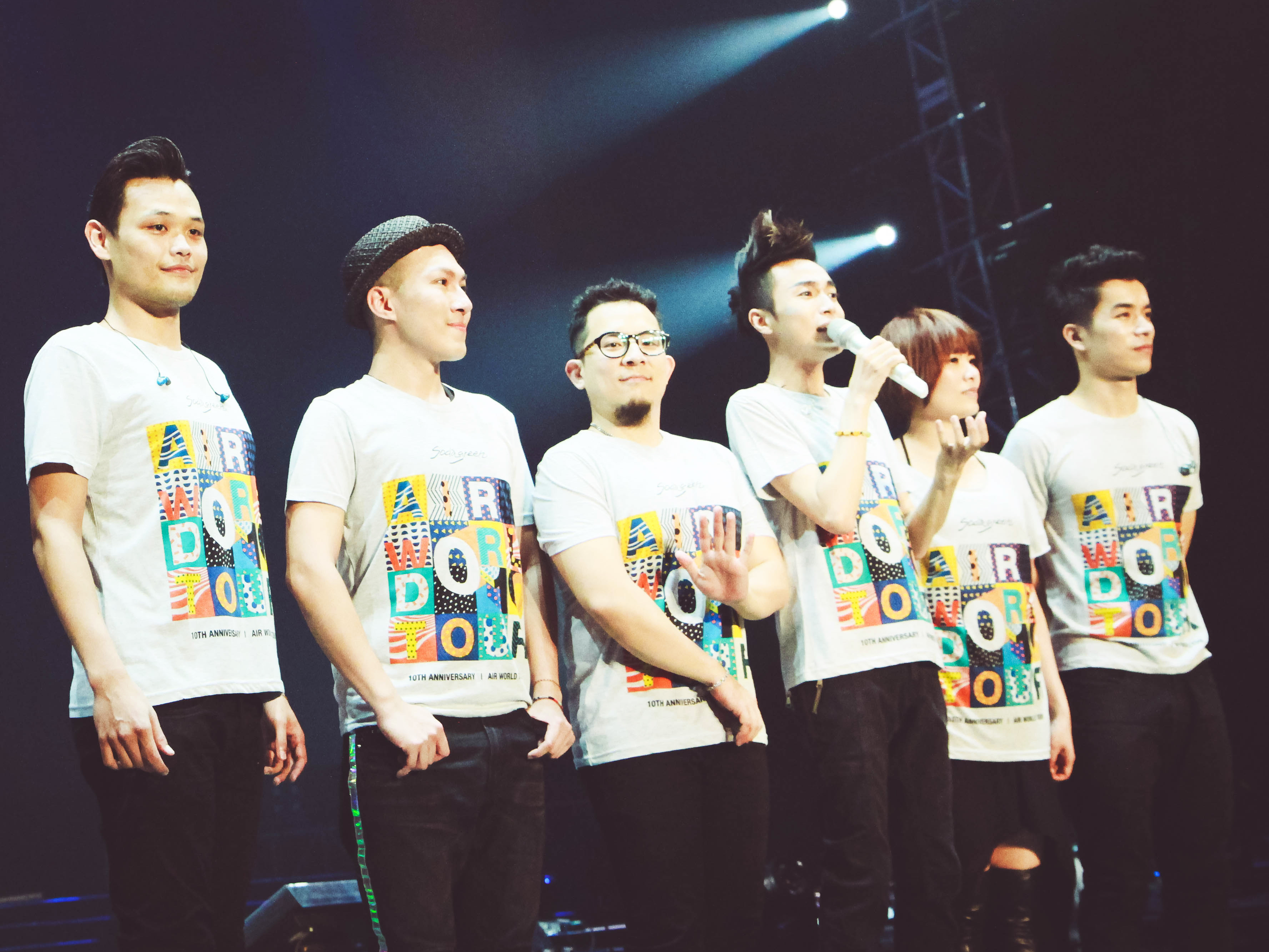
- Sodagreen in 2014. From left to right: A-Fu, A-Gong, Wei, Qing-feng, Claire, Kay

Background information
- Also known as: Oaeen
- Origin: Taipei, Taiwan
- Genres: Indie pop; indie rock; Mandopop
- Years active: 2003–present
- Label: Universal
- Members: Wu Qing-feng; Shie Shin-Yi; Liou Jia-Kai; Shih Jyun-Wei; Ho Jing-Yang; Gong Yu-Chi
- Website: www.sodagreen.com

Sodagreen
- Traditional Chinese: 蘇打綠
- Simplified Chinese: 苏打绿
Transcriptions
Standard Mandarin
- Hanyu Pinyin: Sūdǎ Lǜ

Oaeen
- Traditional Chinese: 魚丁糸
- Simplified Chinese: 鱼丁糸
Transcriptions
Standard Mandarin
- Hanyu Pinyin: Yú Dīng Mì

Sodagreen (Chinese: 蘇打綠; pinyin: Sūdǎ lǜ; stylized as sodagreen) is a Taiwanese indie band formed in 2001. Its members have been unchanged since 2003. Sodagreen emerged in the Taiwanese indie music scene after receiving the Grand Jury Award in the Hohaiyan Gongliau Rock Festival in 2004, after which it signed a contract with Willlin Music. The band is the first indie band to hold a concert in the Taipei Arena.

In 2020, because their "ex-mentor & agent" Lin Weizhe registered the "Sodagreen" trademark first, the band had to use the new name "魚丁糸" (a part of each of the three traditional Chinese characters for "Sodagreen 蘇打綠", literally meaning "fish nail spool") and the English name is Oaeen (also derived from the words "soda" and "green"). On May 30, 2022, the 18th anniversary of Sodagreen's debut, Lin Weizhe announced that he would relinquish the trademark rights to the name "Sodagreen," allowing Wu Qing-feng and the other five members to regain the right to use the band's original name.

== History ==
Sodagreen was named by Shih, the band's leader at the time, and Wu, the lead vocalist. The band was originally named Soda (蘇打), but Shih preferred a name with three syllables. Wu then affixed the word green (綠), his favorite colour, behind Soda, completing the portmanteau.

In May 2001, Sodagreen competed in the Golden Melody Cup held by the National Chengchi University and won the Best Popularity award with the composition "Peeping". With the support of Shiao-Ying, a judge at the competition, it recorded "Peeping" for the compilation Taiwan independent compilation 2001, released by TCM. In April of the next year, after several changes to the line-up of the band (guitarists), Sodagreen participated in the Golden Melody Cup again, this time winning the awards for Best Band, Best Composition, Best Lyrics and Best Music.

In March 2003, A-Fu and Jia-Kai, also from the National Chengchi University, and A-Gong from the Taipei National University of the Arts joined the band, forming its current line-up. In July the same year, the band decided to break up upon graduation and mark its dissolution with a final tour. Its first stop was the Hohaiyan Gongliau Rock Festival's Hot Wave Rock section, where it caught the attention of prominent indie producer Will Lin.

In August 2004, Sodagreen was awarded the Grand Jury Award at the Hohaiyan Gongliau Rock Festival, after which the band was signed by Lin's Willlin Music. In September 2005, they released their self-titled debut album, sodagreen, which was preceded by a few singles and EPs. Through this album, the band garnered a handful of nominations at the 2006 Golden Melody Awards. In October 2006, they released their second album, Little Universe, followed by a single in December- My Future Is Not a Dream, a collaboration with A-pay, a band under the same label.

In June 2007, Sodagreen was awarded the Best Band Award at the 18th Golden Melody Awards. Wu Tsing-Fong also received the highly coveted Best Melody award for Little Love Song, which was also nominated for best lyrics. Little Universe was nominated for the Best Album award. In November, Sodagreen released their third album, Incomparable Beauty. Shortly after, it held its first major concert, the Absolutely Beautiful Concert, which was held at the Taipei Arena, where it made history by being the first indie band to hold a concert there. The concert holds the record for being the longest concert ever held at the venue, with Sodagreen playing for five hours, incurring a large fine for playing too late into the night.

In May 2008, the band released the live album Sing With Me, which included live tracks from the Absolutely Beautiful Concert as well as three new studio tracks. Lover Animal was the official Chinese language theme song for the film Juno. That year at the 19th Golden Melody Awards, they were awarded the Best Band Award for the second time in a row.

In 2009, Sodagreen began its Vivaldi Project, planning to record and release four concept albums based on the four seasons within two years. The band recorded Daylight of Spring in Taidung and released it in May. They then traveled to London to record Summer/Fever, releasing it in September. Late that year, the band held a solo concert at the Taipei Arena for the second time, playing for two nights at the Daylight Fever Concert. However, the band's plans for the third and fourth Vivaldi Project albums were cut short by A-gong's conscription.

In 2010, Sodagreen's two albums garnered a double nomination for the Best Band Award. The music video for the song Daylight won its directors the award for best music video. That year, the band released their second live album, Once in a Lifetime, comprising live recordings from the Daylight Fever Concerts and three studio-recorded songs. The tracks "Once in a Lifetime" and "No Sleep" came in 29th and 84th respectively on Hit Fm Taiwan's Hit FM Annual Top 100 Singles Chart (Hit-Fm年度百首單曲) for 2010. Guitarist A-fu was conscripted shortly after.

Following A-gong's discharge from military service in 2011, the band released its eighth album, What is Troubling You in November. The song Enjoy Loneliness received online prominence after Wu performed it on the talk show Kangxi Lai Le. The music video for the titular song What is Troubling You also trended worldwide on video-sharing website YouTube for a few days after its release. Shortly before A-fu's discharge in January 2012, the band announced that its third Taipei Arena concert, Walk Together, would be held in March that year. The Walk Together World Tour began at the Taipei Arena with two concerts from 3–4 March. This was followed by two sold-out concerts at the Kaohsiung K-Arena on 18 August and 19 August 2012.

Shortly after ending the Walk Together World Tour in Shanghai on 3 August 2013, Sodagreen announced that Autumn: Stories, the third installment in the band's Vivaldi Project, would be released on 18 September 2013. The release of the album in September was accompanied by six live house performances in Beijing, with tickets to these mini-concerts selling out within ten minutes of the opening of online booking services.

In 2014, the band held its tenth-anniversary tour: Aerial Visions, Sounds and Illusions, the title of its first EP. The tour began at the Hong Kong Coliseum on 11 April and saw the band tour various Asian cities over eight months.

In September 2015, Sodagreen announced that the last album in its Vivaldi Project, Winter Endless, would be released on 4 November. On 16 September, the band released the music video for Everyone, a song on the record, which featured members of the band playing in Berlin, where the album was produced and is set.

In 2016, Sodagreen, with its album “Winter Endless”, was the biggest winner at the ceremony in the categories of Best Mandarin Album, Best Band, Best Lyricist, Best Album Producer, and Best Musical Arrangement. After the awards, the band announced that they would be taking a three-year break to look back on their past and decide their future.

In 2019, Wu Tsing-fong pursued his solo career through participation in the seventh season of Hunan Television's singing competition television series, I Am a Singer. His appearance was a success despite finishing as the series' runner-up and losing to the winner Liu Huan in the finals held on April 12, 2019.

In 2020, Sodagreen announced their comeback and released their new single "Tomorrow will be fine.".

The six members also formed a new group 魚丁糸 (oaeen, literally "fish-nail-spool"), whose three characters are ideographic subparts of the characters in the original name 蘇打綠. The anglicization, "oaeen," was a linguistically similar pun, made from the endings of the three syllables in "So-da-green". This name change was due to a name trademark dispute with former producer Lin Wei-che. By May 2022, Lin ended his naming dispute, allowing the band to officially use its original name if it chooses to.

In 2021, Oaeen released their first album Strange Pool. Also this year, their hit "No Sleep (無眠)" was adapted to merengue in Spanish by Dominican singer Luys Bien.

In 2022, Oaeen released a re-recording of their first album Sodagreen (蘇打綠同名專輯), titled Oaeen (魚丁糸不同名專輯). This record included all tracks from Sodagreen, as well as four new cover songs: "ㄐㄧㄢ視" by Sandee Chen, "忧愁" by 小安, "Pretty Thing" by Charlotte Martin, and "That I Would Be Good" by Alanis Morissette. On 1 October 2022, the trademark on the Sodagreen name was bought over by Sodagreen, with a validity of 10 years. In a February 2023 concert, the band officially announced the return of Sodagreen as the band name. However, the master records for the songs sang before the hiatus remained with the band's previous label, and the band encouraged their fans to listen to their rerecordings of the old songs instead.

== Members ==
- Wu Qing-Feng (Greeny；青峰；日出) – lead vocals, piano, harmonica, accordion, percussion, flute
- Hsieh Shin-Yi (Claire；馨儀；香我) – bass guitar, piano, guitar, guzheng/zither, backing vocals, percussion
- Liu Jia-Kai (Kay；家凱；豕豆) – guitar, backing vocals
- Shih Jun-Wei (Wei；小威；八女) – drums, percussion, guitar, harmonica, backing vocals
- Ho Jing-Yang (A Fu；阿福；可田) – guitar, ukulele, backing vocals
- Kung Yu-Chi (A Gong；阿龔；金八) – piano, viola, keyboards, backing vocals

== Discography ==
Studio albums

- Sodagreen (蘇打綠同名專輯；2005)
- Little Universe (小宇宙; 2006)
- Incomparable Beauty (無與倫比的美麗; 2007)
- Daylight of Spring (春・日光; 2009)
- Summer/Fever (夏／狂熱; 2009)
- What is Troubling You (你在煩惱什麼; 2011)
- Autumn: Stories (秋：故事; 2013)
- Winter Endless (冬 未了; 2015)
- Strange Pool (池堂怪談; 2021) - released by the band as oaeen

Live albums and DVDs

- sodagreen sing with me (陪我歌唱；2008)
- That Moment (That Moment小巨蛋現場全紀實；2008)
- Once in a livetime (十年一刻；2010)
- Walk Together (Walk Together；2013)
- AIR WORLD TOUR 10 (空氣中的視聽與幻覺；2015)
- A Endless Story (故事未了；2016)

Extended play

- Air (空氣中的視聽與幻覺；2004)
- Flying Fish (飛魚；2004)
- Believe in music (Believe in music；2004)
- 遲到千年 (遲到千年；2006)
- My future is not a dream (我的未來不是夢；2006)
- Blue eyes (藍眼睛；2007)
- 日光狂熱遺珠之憾 (日光狂熱遺珠之憾；2010)
- Shadow (Shadow；2011)
- 一起喔喔 (一起喔喔；2014)
- 我賴你 (我賴你；2016)

Single

- A Stir In Silence (安靜在沸騰；2012)
- 不甘寂寞. (不甘寂寞；2012)
- 微光 (微光；2014)
- Zinnia Flower (百日告別；2015)
- Tomorrow will be fine. (Tomorrow will be fine.；2020)
- 沙發裡有沙發Radio (沙發裡有沙發Radio；2020)
- 《二十年一刻》單曲計劃
  - You don't have be perfect.（你不需要多完美；2024）
  - Original Flavor（原汁原味；2024）
  - Darkness Before the Dawn（黎明前最暗時候；2024）
  - Dream（夢；2024）
  - All Day Long（一整天；2024）
  - Face the Situationship（面面相覷；2024）
  - Silent Angel（2025）
  - Daydream Rope（白日夢繩索；2025）

Re-recordings

- Oaeen（魚丁糸不同名專輯；2022）
- Little Universe (oaeen ver.)（小宇宙（魚版）；2022）
- Incomparable Beauty (oaeen ver.)（無與倫比的美麗（魚版）; 2023）
- Sing with Me (oaeen ver.)（陪我歌唱（魚版）；2023）
- Once in a lifetime (sodagreen ver.)（十年一刻（蘇打綠版））；2024）
- What's Troubling You (sodagreen ver.) （你在煩惱什麼（蘇打綠版）; 2024）
- Spring · Daylight (sodagreen ver.) （春・日光（蘇打綠版）；2024）
- Summer / Fever (sodagreen ver.) （夏／狂熱（蘇打綠版）；2024）
- Autumn : Stories (sodagreen ver.) （秋：故事（蘇打綠版）；2024）
- Winter Endless (sodagreen ver.) （冬 未了（蘇打綠版）；2025）
