= Bulldog Mansion (EP) =

Bulldog Mansion (Debut E.P.)

EP by Bulldog Mansion
- Released: May 10, 2000
- Genre: Pop rock K-pop
- Length: 28:42

Bulldog Mansion chronology
Bulldog Mansion (Debut E.P.) (2000)	Funk (2002)

Bulldog Mansion, listed as Debut EP, is an EP released on May 10, 2000 by Korean pop rock band Bulldog Mansion.

== Track listing ==
1. "Fever" – 5:01
2. "괜찮아!" – 4:41
3. "피터팬" – 4:07
4. "99" – 5:39
5. "아침에 문득" – 3:36
6. "Fever (DJ'tama'-vocal dub club mix)" – 5:25
