= Fever (Sodagreen album) =

Summer/Fever

Studio album by Sodagreen
- Released: September 11, 2009
- Studios: Strongroom Recording (London, England)
- Genres: Britpop; indie rock; power pop
- Length: 46:07
- Languages: Mandarin; Hokkien
- Label: Willlin Music
- Producer: Will Lin

Sodagreen chronology
Spring·Daylight (2009)	Summer/Fever (2009)	Once in a Lifetime (2010)

Summer/Fever (traditional Chinese: 夏／狂熱; simplified Chinese: 夏／狂热; pinyin: xìa/kūang rè) was released on 11 September 2009, and is the fifth full-length studio album by Taiwanese indie pop band Sodagreen. It is the second of the band's Vivaldi Project, a planned series of four albums representing the four seasons—spring, summer, autumn and winter respectively.

The recording of the album took place in London, England, at Strongroom Recording Studio, and the songs, mostly written by Sodagreen's lead singer Wu Tsing-Fong, contain Britpop elements and lyrical references to the supernatural, Faust, Madame Butterfly, Don Quixote and the Greek god Dionysus, the subject of three brief prose passages between tracks, translated in English by band manager Will Lin and recited by studio engineer Dan McKinna.

The first music video released was for the lead song "Fever", and was directed by the film studio Heroes for Zeroes. It showed the band performing on a rooftop with the night London skyline as a backdrop. Music videos were also released for "He Summers Summer", which showed the everyday lives of ordinary people, "Surround", a montage of photographs of the band, "Sleeplessly", which showed the band performing at The Wall, a performance venue in Taiwan, and "The Near Future", also shot in London, which showed the band walking along the banks of the Thames River, passing landmarks such as Big Ben.

The album includes Sodagreen's first Hokkien song, Sleeplessly (無眠), and earned the band one of its two nominations that year (2010) for Best Band at the 21st Golden Melody Awards.

"Fever" (2009)
Fever performed by Sodagreen

== Track listing ==
All tracks written by Wu Qing-Feng, except where noted; all tracks arranged by Sodagreen and Will Lin; all tracks produced by Lin.

No.	Title	Length
1.	"Claps" (掌聲落下)	2:49
2.	"Summer Summer" (他夏了夏天)	5:04
3.	"The Sound That Remains" (蟬想)	4:43
4.	"Surrounding" (包圍; music: Sodagreen)	4:26
5.	"King's Garden" (御花園)	2:53
6.	"Peter and the Wolf" (彼得與狼)	3:41
7.	"Together We Dance" (共舞)	3:30
8.	"No Sleep" (無眠; lyrics: Wu, Lin; music: Shih Jun-Wei)	3:46
9.	"Fever" (狂熱; music: Shih)	3:25
10.	"Tempted" (煽動; music: Shih)	4:28
11.	"Near Future" (近未來)	6:29

== See also ==
- 21st Golden Melody Awards
