= Shamilla Miller =

South African actress and presenter (born 1988)

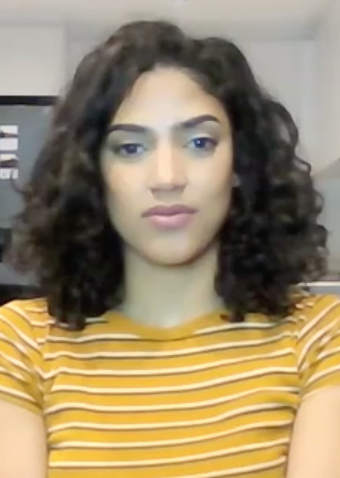
- Miller in 2022
- Born: Shamilla Ismael Miller; 14 September 1988 (age 38); Cape Town, South Africa
- Education: AFDA
- Years active: 2008–present
- Spouse: Clifford Joshua

Shamilla Ismael Miller (born 14 September 1988) is a South African actress, television presenter, and model. She is best known for her roles in Amaza, Forced Love, Tali's Baby Diary, Troy: Fall of a City, and The Girl from St. Agnes.

== Early life and education ==
Shamilla Ismael Miller was born on 14 September 1988 in Cape Town, South Africa.

She graduated with a bachelor's degree in live performance and film from AFDA, The School for the Creative Economy (AFDA) in 2009.

== Career ==
Miller started her acting career in theatre, acting in plays under David Kramer and Alfred Rietman. She also played lead roles in productions such as Krismas van Map Jacob’s (2009) and Baby (2010). From 2011 to 2015, she joined Vulture Productions and performed in five sitcom-style plays performed at the Artscape Theatre and Grahamstown Festival. She also appeared in television commercials.

In 2013, she made her film debut with the Hollywood blockbuster Zulu directed by Jérôme Salle. In 2014, she joined the SABC1 youth drama series Amaza, where she played Ayesha Ibrahim. In 2014 she became a television presenter, where she presented the kids TV show Challenge SOS.

In 2015, she played a guest role, as Chanel, in the second season of the SABC1 comedy-drama series Forced Love. In the meantime, she appeared in many short films such as: Lazy Susan, As ek huistoe kom, Nommer 37, and Kleingeld. For her role in the short Nommer37, she won best actress for her role as Pam at the Mzanzi short film festival.

In 2016 Miller was included in the "Top 12" of the BET reality competition Top Actor Africa. In the same year, she acted in Maynard Kraak's film Sonskyn Beperk as Nicola. In international arena, she acted in the film Bock to School Mom and TV series Hooten and the Lady.

At the end of 2016, Miller moved to Johannesburg, where she had notable television roles. She also played Daniella in the SABC3 soap opera Isidingo. In 2017, she joined the third season of e.tv drama Z'bondiwe, as Hilda Miller. In the same year, she played the support role as Athena in the BBC drama series Troy: Fall of a City.

In 2018, she appeared in the SABC3 police procedural The Docket with a minor role. In the same year, she appeared in Showmax comedy Tali’s Wedding Diary as Kim. The show had the most successful launch day of any series on Showmax ever.

In 2019, she played the role Riley Morgan in the South African Netflix original Blood & Water. In the same year, she appeared in the Showmax's first original series The Girl From St Agnes, playing the role of Jenna. The show later broke the record for the most number of unique viewers in the first 24 hours, previously held by Tali’s Wedding Diary.

In 2021, she appeared in two television series, where playing multiple roles in the SABC2 comedy serial Comedy Mixtape, and then as Kelly Peterson in the Netflix South Africa original Dead Places.

== Filmography ==
Year	Film	Role	Genre	Ref.
2013	Zulu	Bar lady	Film	
2014	T-Junction	Natalie	Short film	
2014	Amaza	Ayesha Ibrahim	TV series	
2015	Nommer 37	Pam	Short film	
2015	Forced Love	Chanel	TV series	
2015	Lazy Susan	Miss Sugar	Short film	
2015	Kleingeld	Corey	Short film	
2016	Isidingo	Daniella	TV series	
2016	Sonskyn Beperk	Nicola	Film	
2016	Hooten & the Lady	Caribbean barmaid	TV mini series	
2017	Z'bondiwe	Hilda Miller	TV series	
2017	Double Echo	Sandra	Film	
2018	Troy: Fall of a City	Athena	TV series	
2018	The Docket	Guest role	TV series	
2018	Tali's Baby Diary	Kim	TV series	
2019	The Girl from St. Agnes	Jenna	TV series	
2020	Blood & Water	Riley Morgan	TV series	
2020	The Verdict	Emerald	Short film	
2020	Jerusalema	Jo	Short film	
2021	Comedy Mixtape	Various roles	TV series	
2021	Dead Places	Kelly Peterson	TV series	
2022	My Beskermer		Short film	
2023	Devil's Peak	Anna Griessel	TV series	
2025	Sniper: Last Stand	Nadia	Film	
