= There She Is!! =

South Korean animated web series

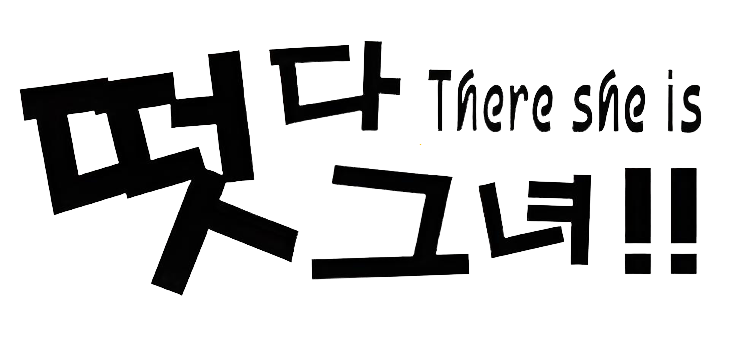
- Hangul: 떳다그녀!!
- RR: Tteotda geunyeo!!
- MR: Ttŏtta kŭnyŏ!!
- Genre: Romance, Comedy-Drama
- Created by: SamBakZa
- Country of origin: South Korea
- Original languages: Korean, English (partial)
- No. of episodes: 6

Production
- Running time: 3-5 minutes

Original release
- Network: Newgrounds
- Release: April 20, 2003 – August 10, 2020

There She Is!! (Korean: 떳다 그녀!!; RR: Tteotda geunyeo!!) is a South Korean Flash animated series produced by the three-person team SamBakZa. Originally hosted on the SamBakZa website, the series gained international popularity in the spring of 2004 upon its introduction to Western audiences. The series originated from the comic strip 'One day' (Korean: 어떤날; RR: Eotteonnal), which was published from November 2000 to March 2002 in The Newspaper We Read Together (Korean: 함께 읽는 신문; RR: Hamkke ingneun sinmun), a Braille publication by the Hankook Ilbo. Distribution rights to the series are licensed to Gyeonggi Digital Contents Agency (GDCA). In 2008, SamBakZa relocated to the Production Support Center in Bucheon, Gyeonggi-do. The creators have expressed plans to implement a registration system on their official website to provide members with email updates regarding new releases.

The series is widely recognised for its high-quality animation and classic manhwa stylistic elements. The overwhelming positive reception of the initial short, which included a surge in fan art and community feedback, prompted SamBakZa to expand the project into a multi-episode series. Since July 2014, all five episodes have consistently ranked within the top 20 of Newground's Best of All Time list, with the original 'There She Is!!' frequently holding the first-place position. To date, the series has accumulated over 13 million views on the Newgrounds platform alone. At the 2004 Anima Mundi animation festival in Brazil, the series achieved critical acclaim, winning first place in both Professional Jury and Audience divisions for Web Animation, as well as the Special Award Anima Mundi Web.

== Premise ==
Doki (right) and Nabi (left) on their culturally biased first date.

The story takes place in a world inhabited by anthropomorphic rabbits and cats, where interspecies relationships are regarded as a social taboo. The narrative centers on the romance between Doki, a rabbit, and Nabi, a cat. The series initial focuses on the relationship between Doki and Nabi, only to later focus on the growing hostility towards the couple by society due to their romance.

Each episode, referred to as a step, has a song for its soundtrack and no dialogue. The final step of There She Is!! debuted on December 9, 2008 with the rest of the series at Joongang Cinema along with various other short Flash animations. The website crashed after its release due to unexpected demand. In 2015, remastered versions of the series were upload to YouTube, with slight changes to the episodes. On January 12, SamBakZa launched an Indiegogo Campaign in order to help fund a new episode of There She Is. The new episode primarily features the Jjintta-set, the three scruffy bunnies, and explores their origins and why they ultimately decided to help Doki and Nabi find their love.

The final step officially aired on August 18, 2020, on Newgrounds for three days for a fee. It was later released on DVD in 2021. Copies of the DVD were first distributed to the Indiegogo Campaign's supporters, and later in May 2021 were made available for purchase via SamBakZa's online store. Amalloc has said that some of the scenes of the film will be released on YouTube in 2021. On March 30, 2024, the full episode became available on SamBakZa's YouTube channel.

== Characters ==
Doki (도키, cf. Korean word tokki 토끼 "rabbit"): A female rabbit who is madly in love with Nabi and considers everyone to be her friends. Although very loving and cheerful, she is somewhat obsessive and willing to go to extremes to get what she wants. She has a habit of befriending animals and putting green ribbons, similar to that of Nabi's, around their necks or tails.

Nabi (나비, cf. Korean word goyang'i 고양이, "kitty"): is a male cat as well as Doki's love interest in the story. He is reluctant to return Doki's love at first, finding her antics annoying and fearing the social repercussions, but grows to tolerate and eventually reciprocate it. He wears a green scarf and seems to have some skill in martial arts. In Step 3, it is shown that he works as a paperboy. Nabi translates to "butterfly", and is a common name for a pet cat in South Korea.

Jjintta Set (Korean: 찐따 세트; RR: Jjintta seteu; lit. 'Moron Set'): A gang of three roughneck, shaggy male cabbits. The three are brothers, the children of a female rabbit and a male lion. They appear as minor antagonists in the second episode, but slowly develop a friendship with Nabi. Their members include:

- Il-ho (Korean: 일호; RR: Ilho; lit. 'Number One'): The firstborn and leader of the group. He has a rather fierce rivalry with Nabi and is extremely protective of Doki. In episode 2, he misunderstands that Nabi was forcing her into a relationship, but realises otherwise later. In episode 5, he gives Nabi a ticket to "Paradise" albeit reluctantly. In the episodes it is unclear what motivates his behaviour, but in 2016, the creator shared that Il-ho's motivation is his parentage.
- Yi-ho (Korean: 이호; RR: Iho; lit. 'Number Two'): The second eldest brother who wears an eye patch and has a crush on the keyboardist, Pi.
- Sam-ho (Korean: 삼호; RR: Samho; lit. 'Number Three'): The youngest brother who wears a medical mask and appears to be less coordinated than the other members of the gang.

Band: While the website's profile does not give any information about them, they are present in Step 2. The band consists of Pi, a female cat keyboardist, and a male rabbit guitarist named Moon

Red Eyes: A tall male bunny wearing sunglasses, and an artist. He was originally created as an antagonist.

Hana: Hana (하나, translating as "One" or common name in Korea) is a female cat, and the apparent owner of the band. She is shown to be very kind, especially towards Doki and Nabi, and has a loving trust in her bodyguard, Pizza.

Pizza: Pizza (피짜, Pijja) is a large male cat, and Hana's bodyguard. He has a noticeable scar over his right eye, but its origin is unknown.

Gray Rabbit: Gray Rabbit (회색 토끼 Hoisaek Tokki, literally Gray Rabbit) is a large male rabbit who is in love with Hana. He is often depicted holding a bouquet of flowers. Works as an electrical engineer.

== Episodes ==
No.	Title	Soundtrack	Original release date
1	"There She Is!!"; Transliteration: "Tteotda! geunyeo!!" (Korean: 떳다! 그녀!!)	"There she is!!" by Witches	20 April 2003
Doki and Nabi encounter each other while getting drinks from a vending machine, where Doki immediately falls in love with him. Nabi attempts to avoid Doki and tries to explain to her that their romance is not socially acceptable, but Doki remains infatuated with him. Eventually, Doki gives in to Nabi's affection, and when he sees Nabi willing to drink fish juice for him, he begins to develop romantic feelings for her.
2	"Cake Dance"; Transliteration: "Keikeu daenseu" (Korean: 케이크 댄스)	"Happy Birthday to Me" by Bulldog Mansion	25 February 2005
Doki is celebrating her birthday at a café, and Nabi has decided to get her a birthday cake. Nabi runs into various obstacles while attempting to deliver the cake, such as being pushed around by crowds of people and getting chased by various animals. As he rushes towards the café, he bumps into the Jjintta Set, a gang of three cabbit brothers. Believing that Nabi had forced himself onto Doki, the gang attacks him. Nabi is able to dodge the gang and arrive at the café, but is pushed by them and drops the cake. Despite this, Doki and Nabi celebrate the former's birthday, with them along with all the other guests being kicked out of the café after Doki publicly shows affection towards Nabi. Nabi later encounters a young rabbit girl trying to deliver cake and offers to help her.
3	"Doki & Nabi"; Transliteration: "Doki wa nabi" (Korean: 도키 와 나비)	"3rd Sexual Characteristics" by T.A.-COPY	30 May 2008 (Note: First premiered at SICAF (Seoul International Cartoon & Animation Festival) on May 21–25, 2008, and was posted online on May 30.)
Doki and Nabi go on their first date, though Nabi is still hesitant to show any affection towards Doki. While on their date, Doki finds and adopts a hedgehog as her pet, tying a green ribbon around it. As the day progresses, Nabi is still reluctant to reciprocate Doki's feelings for him. Dropping off Doki at her house and returning home, Nabi is reminded of how excited Doki was for their first date and rushes back to her house to ask for a second date, which she happily accepts. The two meet up that night and share their first kiss, while a rock is thrown into Nabi's house.
4	"Paradise"; Transliteration: "Paradaiseu" (Korean: 파라다이스)	"A Lunar Eclipse" by Tabu	20 August 2008
Doki and Nabi are discriminated against due to their relationship, with Nabi's house getting vandalized and the couple being harassed in public. During a protest against their relationship, Doki is spotted and chased by several protestors. Her pet hedgehog jumps down to confront the protestors and Doki tries to rescue it, resulting in both of them being attacked with Doki hospitalized. Worried that being together is endangering Doki's life, Nabi ends their relationship. Inside Doki's house, it's shown that she had bought two plane tickets for her and Nabi to escape to a place known as Paradise. Il-ho sees this and punches Nabi for breaking up with Doki, resulting in a riot between Nabi's supporters and opponents that leads to Nabi and Il-ho being arrested. Doki's hedgehog dies from its injuries and she attempts to call Nabi, unaware he in incarcerated. When Nabi doesn't answer, Doki, believing their relationship is truly over, decides to leave for Paradise by herself.
5	"Imagine"	"Imagine" by Brunch	9 December 2008
Doki ties her late pet hedgehog's green ribbon onto a tree branch before heading to the airport. Nabi is released from custody and goes back to the area where he and Doki first met, where he rescues an abandoned bird. The bird leads Nabi to the tree Doki had been to previously, where he sees multiple green ribbons tied to it. Realizing how much Doki cared for their relationship despite society's prejudices, Nabi rushes to the airport to reunite with Doki, assisted by his various friends. Nabi arrives at the airport and embraces Doki out of pure love, rekindling their relationship. The couple return back to the vending machines where they first met to clean up the graffiti on it, sharing a toast together.
6	"Another Step"	"Untouchable" by schizo	18 August 2020
As a young kid, Il-ho is bullied by his school peers due to his mixed lion-rabbit heritage. In the present day, Il-ho attempts to make Pi, a guitarist and girlfriend of his younger brother Yi-ho, leave their house. A fight breaks out between the two brothers, resulting in Yi-ho being thrown out a window. Yi-ho joins an extremist pro-protestor group, assaulting anti-protestors. When Pi witnesses Yi-ho assault and drag away an anti-protestor during one of her shows, she recruits Il-ho and Sam-ho in confronting their brother, who is imprisoning the anti-protestors at a junkyard. The group manage to free the anti-protestors, but when they start to charge Yi-ho, Il-ho pushes him aside and roars at the anti-protestors, intimidating them to stop. An excavator loses its balance and lands on Il-ho, and Pi, Sam-ho, and both pro-protestors and anti-protestors work together to lift the excavator and help Yi-ho rescue his older brother.

== Merchandising ==
Several requests have been made for various There She Is!! merchandising, such as T-shirts and DVDs. SamBakZa have not made anything available, although they have indicated that a DVD is forthcoming. amalloc announced on April 4, 2012 that a There She Is!! DVD was being produced with modified scenes and may contain TSI comic strips. The project was suspended due to Amalloc's other works, though he said that he was still planning to work on the project. an update to this source, SamBakaZa came out with an Official Store Webpage the release of the Official store happened at Thursday 6 May 2021 some of the merchandise is a Doki & nabi Short Sleeve T-shirt: Limited design commemorating the 2016 Indiegogo campaign, There She Is!! Memorial DVD, Here She Comes!! Illustration Postcard Set, and an Here She Comes!! Illustration Postcard Set
