= Fever (The Morning Show) =

- The Morning Show episode
- Episode no.: Season 2 Episode 10
- Directed by: Mimi Leder
- Written by: Kerry Ehrin
- Cinematography by: Michael Grady
- Editing by: Sidney Wolinsky
- Original release date: November 19, 2021
- Running time: 61 minutes

Guest appearances
- Valeria Golino as Paola Lambruschini (special guest star); Holland Taylor as Cybil Reynolds; Joe Tippett as Hal Jackson; Damon Dayoub as Glenn Corn; Markus Flanagan as Gerald Drummond; Victoria Tate as Rena Robinson; Joe Marinelli as Donny Spagnoli; Joe Pacheco as Bart Daley; Eli Bildner as Joel Rapkin; Amber Friendly as Layla Bell

Episode chronology
| ← Previous "Testimony" | Next → "The Kármán Line" |

"Fever" is the tenth episode and season finale of the second season of the American drama television series The Morning Show, inspired by Brian Stelter's 2013 book Top of the Morning. It is the twentieth overall episode of the series and was written by series developer Kerry Ehrin, and directed by executive producer Mimi Leder. It was released on Apple TV+ on November 19, 2021.

The series follows the characters and culture behind a network broadcast morning news program, The Morning Show. After allegations of sexual misconduct, the male co-anchor of the program, Mitch Kessler, is forced off the show. It follows Mitch's co-host, Alex Levy, and a conservative reporter Bradley Jackson, who attracts the attention of the show's producers after a viral video. In the episode, Alex quarantines herself, while the staff prepares for lockdowns as the pandemic worsens.

The episode received mixed reviews from critics, with many criticizing the unresolved storylines, considering it an unsatisfying closure to the season.

== Plot ==
As the COVID-19 pandemic continues spreading in the country, Alex (Jennifer Aniston) returns to her house to quarantine herself. Nevertheless, Bradley (Reese Witherspoon) continue searching for Hal (Joe Tippett) in the streets.

Alex contacts Stella (Greta Lee) to inform her that she has been diagnosed with COVID, and Stella alerts the staff without telling them who is infected. As the staff is told they will have to operate from their homes, Stella asks Daniel (Desean Terry) to be the main anchor for the time. Daniel refuses, deciding to go to Los Angeles to bring his grandfather back to take care of him. When Stella protests, Daniel quits his job, revealing that Mia (Karen Pittman) told him about Stella's perception of him. Even with the incoming lockdowns, Cory (Billy Crudup) is still hopeful that the company's streaming service, UBA+, can be a success.

Alex feels her condition is worsening, but she is not advised to go to the hospital. She contacts Chip (Mark Duplass) to talk to him, expressing guilt that she might have infected someone. To aid her, Chip asks Cory to have Alex do a program about her experiences with COVID-19, with Cory agreeing to air it on UBA+ after it fails to attract subscribers. Despite not being exposed, Chip visits Alex to convince her to be part of the show. During this, Cory is visited by Paola (Valeria Golino), who wants to show her work. Cory is not interested but still gives her two minutes to watch her work. The footage includes Mitch's interview, where he expresses remorse for his actions. He is impressed and tells her to release it to boost her career.

When a special event is cancelled after the guests Tom Hanks and Rita Wilson contract COVID, Cory decides to help Bradley in finding Hal. He takes the opportunity to declare his love for her, but it is interrupted when Bradley is called by a hospital after Hal is found. Arriving at the hospital, she reunites with Hal, who was injured in a fight. During the broadcast, Alex talks with multiple people over the severity of the virus and about the concept of death. Alex then takes a moment to confront people for wishing her declining health, feeling that they took an interest with her personal life over her work. She tells the audience that she is done apologizing for who she is, and concludes the broadcast by wishing well on everyone.

== Development ==
=== Production ===
The episode was written by series developer Kerry Ehrin, and directed by executive producer Mimi Leder. This was Ehrin's sixth writing credit, and Leder's seventh directing credit.

=== Writing ===
On Alex's broadcast, Ehrin said, "The fever to me was almost representative as a fire that burned her, and she rises out of it like a phoenix with a better sense of her true self and the person she wants to be. And so that was sort of a symbolic meaning for me. And it was always very much attached to her doing a live show where she took people through having COVID. And, in doing that, she re-found herself as a news person and also as a human, and how she connected to people on the other side of the camera, to the audience, in a more human way." She added, "this person who has been through so much emotionally and internally and has come to a point where’s she’s gotten washed up on the beach, and is just picking herself up. That to me is where we end it, and I'm really very proud of it." With the final scene, director Mimi Leder said, "we wanted it to feel more like a prayer than a pronouncement. That it was Alex saying: This is what I hope for, this is what I wish for; this is what I want it to be. We really wanted it to be singular with her, alone, in some way having it be raw, naked and exposed. To be like a prayer."

== Critical reviews ==
"Fever" received mixed reviews from critics. Maggie Fremont of Vulture gave the episode a 3 star rating out of 5 and wrote, "As we arrive at the finale of the second season of The Morning Show, I have a very serious question to ask: Is Chip Black the biggest idiot on the planet? No, seriously, I'm asking. Why in the actual world would he risk getting a deadly disease — in March 2020!! No one knew anything about COVID!! — for Alex freaking Levy."

Linda Holmes of NPR wrote, "I set out to examine these episodes to try to figure out why this very watchable show, which features a lot of very likable actors, has never worked for me for more than a few scenes at a time. Why, despite the obviously abundant talent involved, it wasn't actually good. And I think it's just... I don't like Alex and Bradley, and if you don't like them, the stories about them are unsatisfying. That's not because you can't care about flawed characters; it's because their flaws are never really addressed. I mean, maybe they'll come back at the beginning of a theoretical season 3 and Bradley will be apologizing for breathing all over an ER full of people like a selfish goober. But I seriously doubt it." Claire Di Maio of The Young Folks gave the episode a 6 out of 10 and wrote, "It's an odd place to leave The Morning Show in. It's up to AppleTV+ to decide if they’re still on the Alex Levy train, but her unapologetic embrace of her worst (and arguably dangerous) parts of herself may leave audiences at the station, should there be a third season."

Lacy Baugher of Telltale TV gave the episode a 1.5 star rating out of 5 and wrote, "The Morning Show Season 2 Episode 10, “Fever,” is a messy end to a wildly uneven season, but at this point, I can't imagine that anyone is terribly surprised. It feels like this show consistently made the weirdest, most indefensible choices all season long, from dedicating so much screen time to Mitch Kessler — whether alive or dead! — to its bizarre handling of the early days of the coronavirus pandemic, so it's not a shock that it keeps right on doing that here." Chike Coleman of We Live Entertainment gave the episode a 7 out of 10 rating and wrote, "Jennifer Aniston's character has constantly been a thorn in my side the entire season because of how she treats people, but now she's using that same level of animosity and contempt to shock viewers into being safe with their lives to this pandemic. This is a courageous choice by the writers to have an unlikeable character; both do the decent thing and still be that sharp-tongued, despicable character to help audiences understand the gravity of the world's situation."

=== Accolades ===
TVLine named Jennifer Aniston as an honorable mention for the "Performer of the Week" for the week of November 20, 2021, for his performance in the episode. The site wrote, "Say what you will about The Morning Show's polarizing second season: Jennifer Aniston was on fire in the finale. As Alex was laid low both physically and emotionally by COVID-19, Aniston turned in a performance that blunted absolutely zero of the character's barb-lined edges. We loved it. The Emmy winner's most impressive moment (of the season, perhaps?) came during Alex's UBA+ broadcast in which she chose to drop Alex's morning-show mask and let the world see her fury over being publicly swept up in Mitch's mess. She cried. She raged. She commanded everyone to “get on the Alex Levy train or stay at the station.” We still don't think we like Alex Levy all that much, but man, do we love watching Aniston play her."
