= Samuel Russell Feaver =

New Zealand farmer, pharmacist, veterinary surgeon and photographer

Samuel Russell Feaver (5 February 1878 – 3 November 1946) was a New Zealand farmer, pharmacist, veterinary surgeon and photographer. He was born in St Leonards, Sussex, England. He moved to New Zealand in 1895 and settled in Ōpunake in 1900. He was a member of the Royal College of Veterinary Surgeons for his invention of a small curved scalpel used in internal dissections and work on animal mastitis.
