= Dead Before Dying =

1999 novel by Deon Meyer

- Author: Deon Meyer
- Original title: Feniks
- Working title: Feniks
- Translator: Madeleine van Biljon
- Language: Afrikaans
- Genre: Mystery
- Set in: Cape Town
- Publisher: Little, Brown
- Publication date: 1996
- Publication place: South Africa
- English publication date: 1999
- Media type: Print
- Pages: 346
- ISBN: 978-3-7466-3050-2 (first edition)

Dead Before Dying is a novel written by South African novelist Deon Meyer. It was first published as Feniks in Afrikaans in 1996 before being translated by Madeleine van Biljon in 1999. The novel has been adapted into a series known as Cape Town.
