= Close the Door campaign =

UK energy conservation campaign

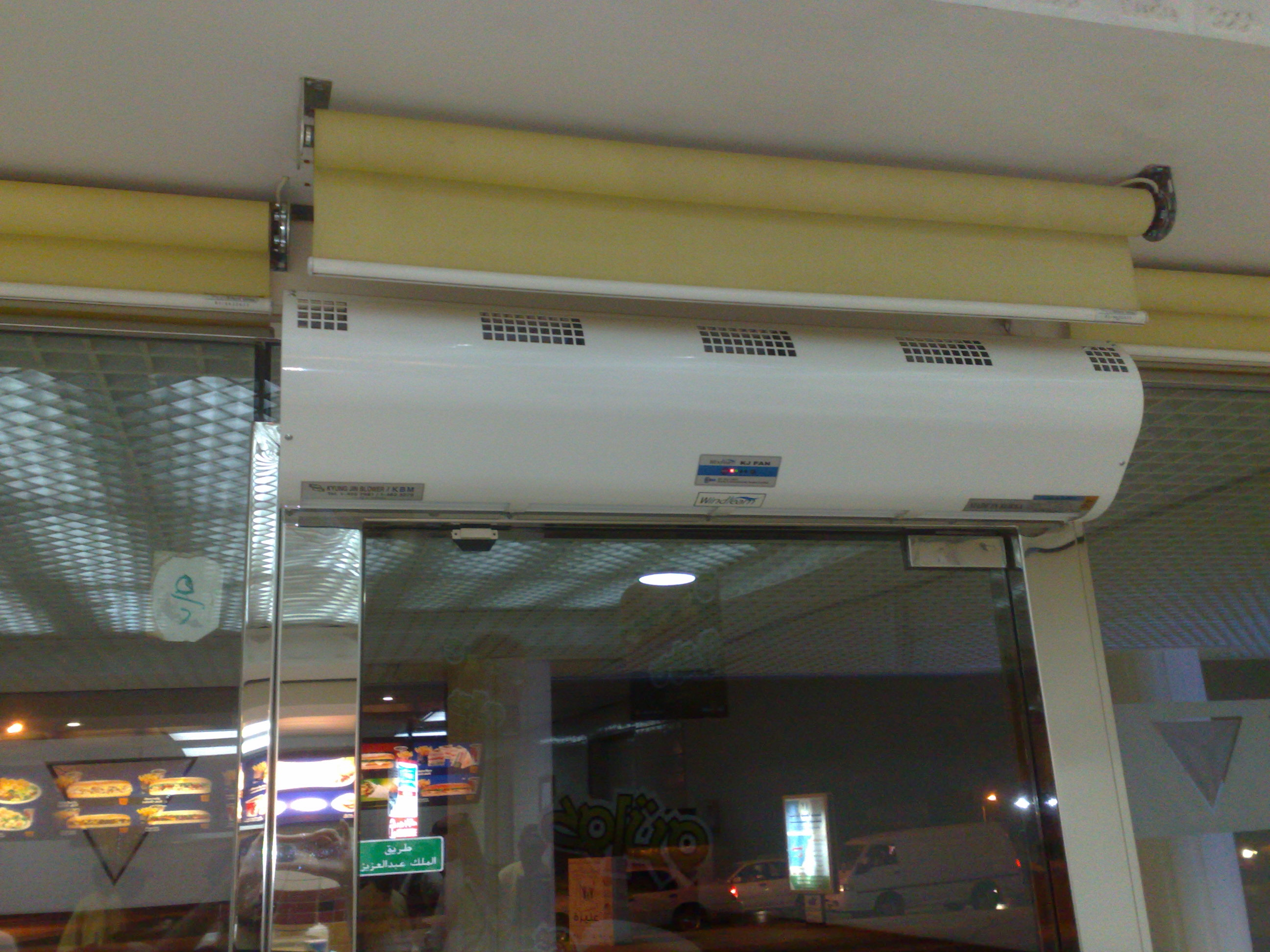
Air curtain

The Close the Door campaign is a national campaign in the United Kingdom to encourage retailers to keep their doors closed to conserve energy and reduce carbon emissions.

== Overview ==
As well as the national campaign, which is supported by major retailers including Marks and Spencer, Tesco, John Lewis Partnership, Wickes and Boots, there are also local campaigns in various cities including Cambridge (where the campaign was founded), Birmingham, London and York.

In addition to encouraging the participation of retailers, consumers are also encouraged to participate by closing shop doors and boycotting shops that refuse to close their doors.

== Affiliations ==
The Campaign is supported by the shopworkers Union USDAW both because of the energy reduction and the increase in staff comfort.

The Carbon Trust and the British Retail Consortium are members of the steering group.

== See also ==
- Ethical consumerism
