= Betty Feves =

American sculptor (1918–1985)

- Born: 1918; Washington
- Died: 1985 (aged 66–67); Pendleton, Oregon
- Spouse: Dr. Lou Feves
- Awards: Governor's Awards for the Arts (1997), Portland State University Distinguished Service Award (1983)
- Elected: Oregon State Board of Education (1975–1979)
- Memorials: Betty Feves Memorial Gallery
- Website: mocc.pnca.edu/exhibitions/2236/

Betty Feves (1918 – 1985) was an Oregon artist who helped shape the development of clay as an expressive medium in the years following World War II.

== Biography ==
Feves was academically trained in the late 1930s and early 1940s, first earning a degree in art with a strong secondary emphasis on music at Washington State College, now Washington State University, where she studied with the noted artist Clyfford Still. She studied during a summer session with Alexander Archipenko at the University of Washington, and later at his studio in New York during 1940. Feves worked at Design Technics, a design studio in New York City during World War II, where she also attended classes taught by Ossip Zadkine at the Art Student's League. Following her marriage to Dr. Lou Feves, she returned to the Pacific Northwest, where she lived in Pendleton, OR until her death in 1985.

Betty Feves is recognized in her community as a mentor by many artists, including James Lavadour, who used Betty Feves' community activism as one of the models for the development of Crow's Shadow Institute for the Arts, Pendleton, OR. Music played an equally important role in her life. In 1967, Feves was instrumental in arranging a visit by Dr. Shinichi Suzuki to Pendleton, his only stop in the Pacific Northwest that year.

Using primarily locally sourced materials and glazes she created herself, Betty Feves work is inspired by the land both through materials and forms. Feves earned a national and international reputation for her work, and established new approaches to working with clay. Her first entry into publicly exhibiting her artwork came in 1952, when she entered Three Figures in the Third Annual Exhibition of Northwest Ceramics at the Oregon Ceramic Studio, now the Museum of Contemporary Craft, and Four Figures in the 17th Ceramic National at Syracuse Museum of Fine Arts, now the Everson Museum of Art. In 1957, she was a presenter at the groundbreaking American Craft Council Conference at Asilomar, CA, recognized today as the first convening of modern craftsman and a pivotal moment in the American Craft Movement. Her work is included in collections of The Smithsonian Institution, Museum of Contemporary Craft in partnership with Pacific Northwest College of Art, Portland Art Museum, The Henry Art Gallery, and private collections.

In 2012, the Museum of Contemporary Craft in partnership with the Pacific Northwest College of Art honored the artist with Generations: Betty Feves, the first museum retrospective exhibition and publication to focus on the artist's work and life. In 2020, The Jordan Schnitzer Museum of Art, Washington State University presented the exhibition Betty Feves: The Earth Itself.
