= Deon Meyer =

South African crime/thriller novelist

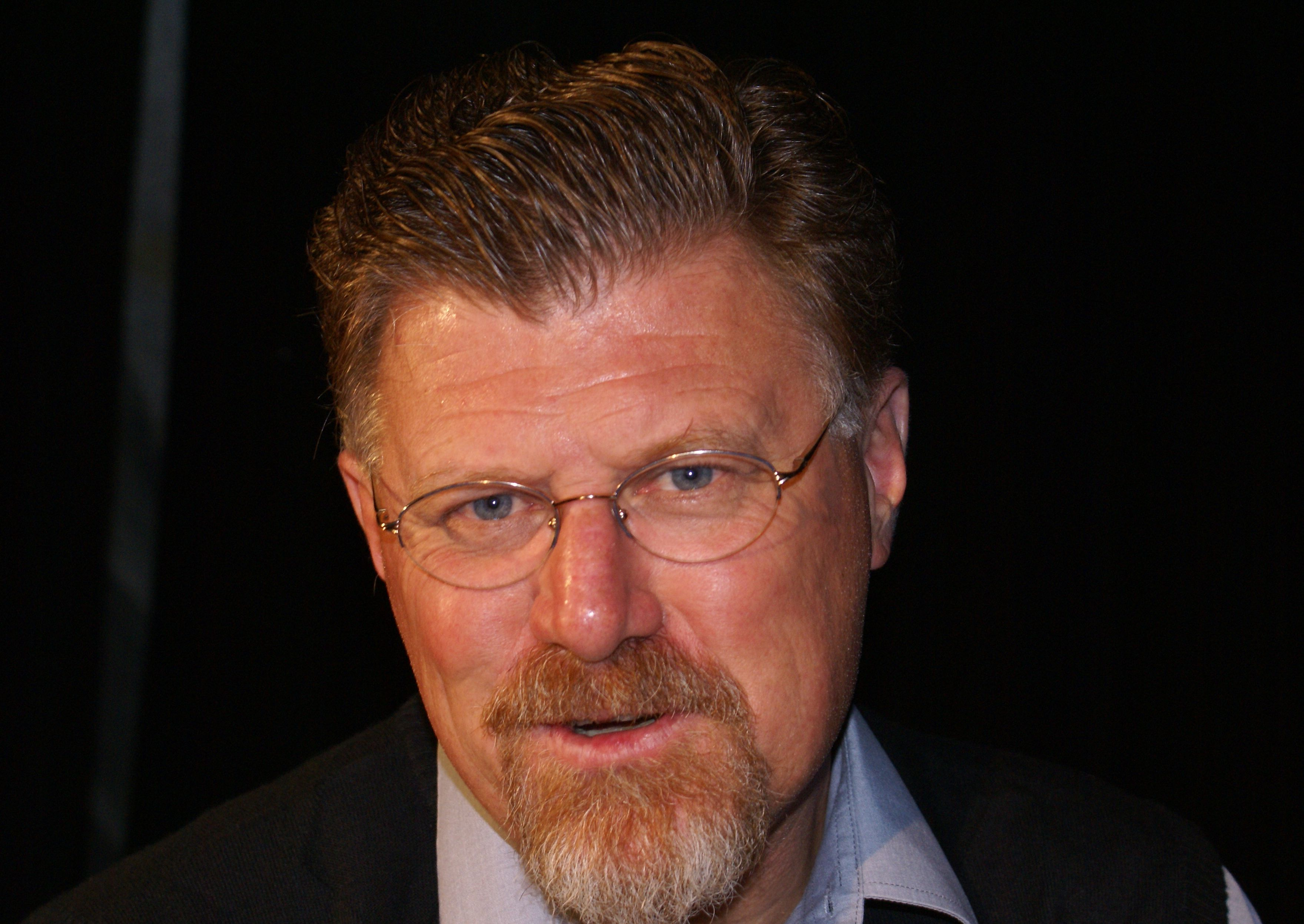
- Deon Meyer, South African novelist.
- Born: Paarl, Western Cape, South Africa
- Education: University of Potchefstroom
- Occupations: Novelist, screenwriter
- Writing career
- Language: Afrikaans
- Period: 1999 – present
- Genre: Crime/thriller fiction
- Notable awards: Grand prix de littérature policière 2003 Prix Mystère de la critique 2004
- Website: deonmeyer.com

Deon Godfrey Meyer is a South African thriller novelist, writing primarily in Afrikaans. His works have been translated into 28 languages. He has also written numerous scripts for television and film.

== Early life and education ==
Deon Meyer was born in Paarl, South Africa.

He matriculated in 1976 at the Schoonspruit High School in Klerksdorp. He then attended Potchefstroom University for Christian Higher Education, where he gained a BA with English and History as majors. He later obtained an honours degree at the University of the Free State.

== Career ==
In the 1980s he worked as a journalist at Die Volksblad, at the public relations office of the University of the Free State, and began work as advertising copy writer at Sanlam. In 1991 he was appointed manager of Internal Communication and creative director of Sanlam's publicity department.

After leaving Sanlam, he started his own business specialising in the creation and management of virtual communities on the internet. He then worked as manager of special projects at BMW motorcycles.

He currently writes full-time.

== Personal life ==
Meyer was a long-time resident of historical coastal resort of Melkbosstrand, where he wrote most of his novels.

His hobbies include touring Southern Africa on a motorcycle.

== Novels ==
Deon Meyer's novel-writing career started when the Afrikaans magazine, Huisgenoot, published a short story he had submitted. Since then, he has written fifteen novels and two short story collections. His novels reflect current social issues in South Africa, including that of the apartheid system. His main characters are flawed but empathetic cops.

=== Bibliography ===
- (1994) Wie met vuur speel
- (1996) Feniks (English title: Dead Before Dying — published in 1999)
- (1997) Bottervisse in die jêm: 13 kortverhale (A collection of thirteen short stories)
- (1998) Orion (also dramatised for television) (English title: Dead at Daybreak — published in 2000)
- (2000) Proteus (English title: Heart of the Hunter — published in 2003)
- (2007) Onsigbaar (English title: Blood Safari — published in 2009)
- (2009) "Transito" (series written for television)
- (2010) Karoonag en ander verhale (A collection of short stories)
- (2010) Spoor (English title: Trackers — published in 2011)
- (2016) Koors (English title: Fever — published in 2017)

==== Benny Griessel Mysteries ====
- (2004) Infanta (English title: Devil's Peak — published in 2007)
- (2008) 13 Uur (English title: Thirteen Hours — published in 2010)
- (2011) 7 Dae (English title: Seven Days — published in 2012)
- (2013) Kobra (English title: Cobra — published in 2014)
- (2015) Ikarus (English title: Icarus — published in 2015)
- (2017) Die vrou in die blou mantel (English title: The Woman in the Blue Cloak - published in 2018)
- (2018) Prooi (English title: The Last Hunt — published in 2019)
- (2020) Donkerdrif (English title: The Dark Flood — published in 2021)
- (2023) Leo — (English title: Leo — published in 2024)
- (2025) Skorpio — (English title: Scorpio Rising — to be published in 2027)

== Film and television rights ==
Feniks (Dead Before Dying) was the first novel for which film rights were awarded. The screenplay, written by South African writer Johann Potgieter, was finalised in 2008 but was never made into a motion picture. It was adapted again in 2015 by German TV-producer Annette Reeker as Cape Town, an international co-produced TV-series.

Transito was specially written for television and aired in 2008.

The novel Orion (Dead at Daybreak) was dramatised for television.

In August 2009 the film rights for 13 Uur (Thirteen Hours) were awarded to British producers Malcolm Kohll and Robert Fig. Roger Spottiswoode was appointed to direct the film.

The film rights for Proteus (Heart of the Hunter) were granted to a South African company. Heart of the Hunter was subsequently released in 2024.

The 2019 South African TV series Trackers is based on Meyer's 2011 novel of the same name. It premiered in the US on June 5, 2020.

Devil's Peak, the first Benny Griessel novel, was adapted in 2023 as a five episode TV series for M-Net, with Hilton Pelser starring as Griessel.

== Awards and nominations ==
Meyer’s novels have been nominated for and have won numerous awards.

Blood Safari won the inaugural ATKV Prize for Best Suspense Fiction in 2008. It also received the German Krimi Award (third place) in 2009.

Dead at Daybreak won the French Prix Mystère de la critique 2004. It was awarded best television script for a South African series by the Afrikaanse Taal en Kultuurvereniging in 2007 and won the ATKV Prose Prize in 2000. It was shortlisted for the Swedish Martin Beck Award for best translated crime fiction in 2008, the M-Net Book Prize, and the Sunday Times Literary Prize.

Dead before Dying (French title Jusqu'au Dernier) won Le Grand Prix de Littérature Policière 2003.

Devil’s Peak won the Martin Beck Award ("Den gyllene kofoten" or The golden crowbar) by the Swedish Academy of Crime Writers in 2010. It also won ATKV Prose Prize for 2004 and the Readers' Award from CritiquesLibres.com for Best Crime Novel or Thriller in 2010.

Heart of the Hunter (Afrikaans title Proteus) won the ATKV Prose Prize in 2003 and the Deutscher Krimi Preis in 2006.

13 Hours won the ATKV Prize for Best Suspense Fiction in 2009 and the Exclusive Books Boeke Prize (Exclusive Books Fanatics choice) in 2011.

Seven Days (Afrikaans title 7 Dae) won the M-Net Literary Award (Film category) in 2012.
