= Fever (app) =

Live entertainment ticketing platform

- Type: Platform
- Industry: Entertainment
- Founded: 2012; 14 years ago
- Founders: Alexandre Perez Casares, Francisco Hein, Ignacio Bachiller and Pep Gomez
- Headquarters: London Madrid
- Number of employees: 5,000 (2026)
- Website: feverup.com

Fever is a live entertainment ticketing platform that provides users access to various cultural and entertainment events on iOS, Android, and the web. Additionally, it offers ticketing, marketing and technology services for event management companies.

== History ==
Fever was founded in 2012 in Barcelona. The company has offices and headquarters in Madrid, London, and New York. Its parent company, Kzemos Technologies, was incorporated in Barcelona in 2011 by Fever's co-founder, Pep Gómez.

In 2014, Fever launched its product, and was co-led by Ignacio Bachiller, Francisco Hein, and Alexandre Pérez. As of 2015, Fever had expanded across major European cities, including London, Madrid, Barcelona, and Valencia. In 2015, it closed €11 million funding round led by Accel Partners.

In July 2018, Fever raised $20 million in a funding round led by Atresmedia to expand its event discovery platform. In August 2019, Fever raised $35 million in a funding round led by Rakuten Capital and Atresmedia to expand its entertainment discovery platform.

In January 2022, Fever raised $227 million in a funding round led by Goldman Sachs, reaching a valuation of $1 billion.

In January 2023, Fever raised $110 million in a funding round led by Goldman Sachs Asset Management, bringing its valuation to $1.8 billion.

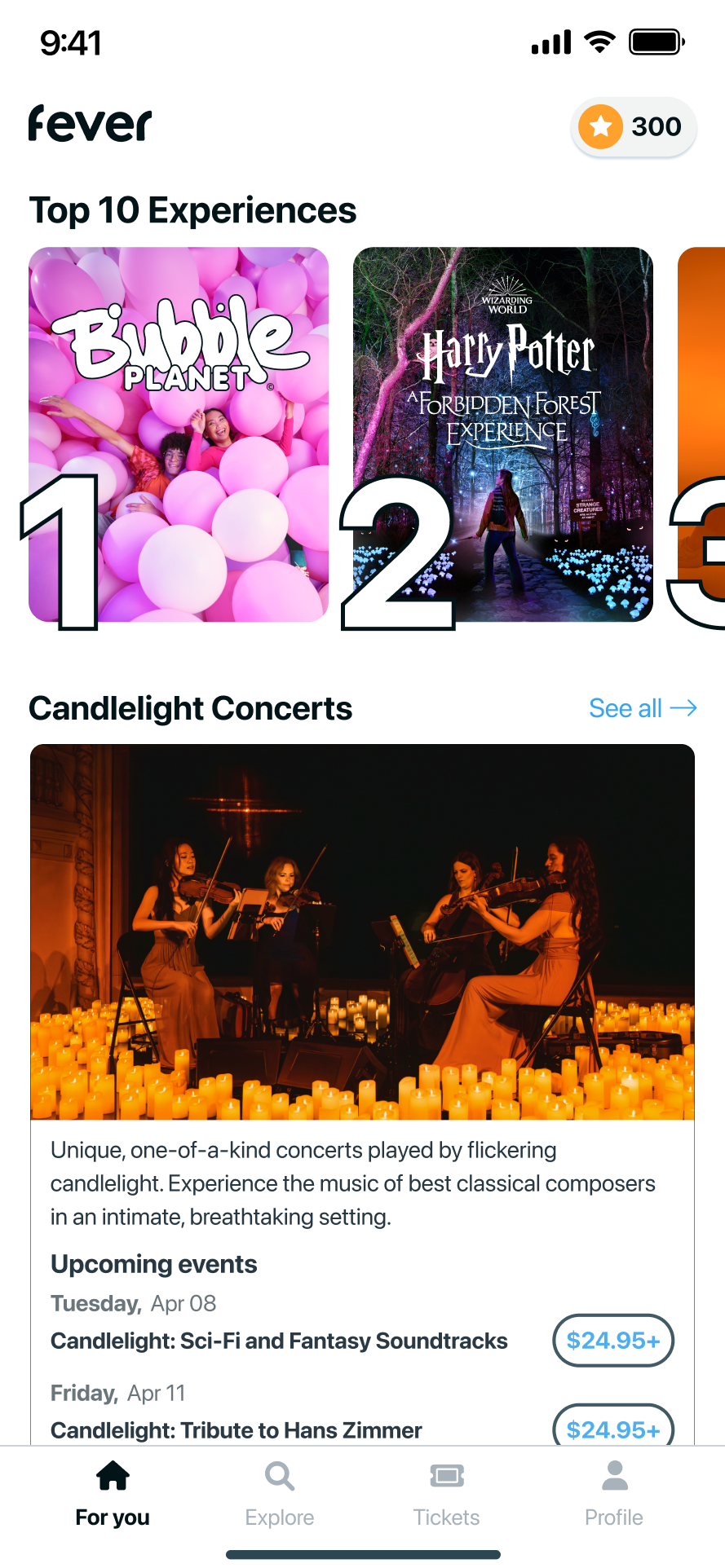
Image of the home page in the iOS version of the Fever mobile app

In August 2024, FC Barcelona partnered with Fever to improve its ticket sales platform ahead of the team's return to Camp Nou.

In October 2024, Fever partnered with Primavera Sound, a prominent music festival in Spain. As part of this collaboration, Fever became the official ticketing partner for the festival, offering exclusive access to full festival tickets for upcoming editions in Barcelona and Porto, as well as tickets for Primavera Tours, concerts organized by Primavera Labels, and live shows of Radio Primavera Sound.

In June 2025, Fever acquired the British ticketing platform DICE, a day after announcing a funding round of over $100 million led by L Catterton and Point72.

In 2026, Formula 1 signed a five-year contract with Fever to handle race ticketing starting in 2027. Under the agreement, Fever will run the ticketing platform on F1.com for general admission, local hospitality, and Paddock Club tickets.

The company, which is valued at more than $1.8 billion, has investors including Goldman Sachs; Eurazeo, one of Europe’s largest private equity funds; and other U.S. investors leading in the consumer technology and entertainment sectors, including Convivialité Ventures, Goodwater Capital, one of Silicon Valley’s leading consumer technology funds and an investor in brands such as Spotify and TikTok; Alignment Growth; Vitruvian Partners; and Smash Capital, a venture capital firm led by former Disney executives that invests in brands such as Epic Games, the creators of Fortnite.

== Platforms ==
Fever operates a responsive web marketplace accessible on all devices and offers dedicated apps for Android and iOS. The platform offers a catalog of events and experiences organized into categories, including tourism, gastronomy, culture, cinema, sporting events, immersive experiences, and Candlelight concerts, among others. After selecting an experience or plan, users can check availability, view venue details and directions based on their location, and book tickets.

As of June 2026, Fever operates in more than 500 cities across more than 30 countries worldwide.

In addition to its consumer-facing marketplace, Fever's platform uses proprietary technology to analyze data and help event and experience creators reach new audiences and scale their offerings.
