= Raghu Dakat (soundtrack) =

2025 soundtrack album by Nilayan Chatterjee and Rathijit Bhattacharjee

Soundtrack album by Nilayan Chatterjee and Rathijit Bhattacharjee
- Released: 21 September 2025
- Recorded: 2025
- Studios: Sound Symphony Studios, Mumbai; Sunshine Studio, Mumbai; BBay Studios, Mumbai; Kailasa Studios
- Genres: Feature film soundtrack, Indian conventional music, Bengali folk, soft rock
- Length: 15:25
- Language: Bengali
- Label: SVF Music
- Producers: Nilayan Chatterjee; Rathijit Bhattacharjee

Nilayan Chatterjee chronology
Dhumketu (2025)	Raghu Dakat (2025)	Mon Maaney Na (2026)

Rathijit Bhattacharjee chronology
Sonar Kellay Jawker Dhan (2025)	Raghu Dakat (2025)	Projapati 2 (2025)

Singles from Raghu Dakat
- 1. "Joy Kaali" Released: 27 August 2025; 2. "Jhilmil Laage Re" Released: 6 September 2025; 3. "Raghu Raghu" Released: 24 September 2025; 4. "Agunpakhi" Released: 1 October 2025

Raghu Dakat is the soundtrack album composed by Nilayan Chatterjee and Rathijit Bhattacharjee, to the 2025 Indian Bengali-language epic period action-adventure film of the same name, directed by Dhrubo Banerjee. The film stars Dev in the titular role of a legendary folk hero set against the backdrop of the Indigo revolt (1859–1860), alongside Anirban Bhattacharya, Sohini Sarkar and Idhika Paul. The film is produced by Shrikant Mohta and Dev under the banners of Shree Venkatesh Films and Dev Entertainment Ventures.

The album was released on 21 September 2025, under the SVF Music label, ahead of the film's theatrical release during Durga Puja. Lyrics were penned by Chatterjee himself with Sugata Guha, Prasen and Barish. The soundtrack contains four singles—"Joy Kaali", "Jhilmil Laage Re", "Raghu Raghu" and "Agunpakhi".

== Background ==
Initially Bickram Ghosh was approached to compose for Raghu Dakat, in his fifth collaboration with Dhrubo Banerjee after Guptodhoner Sandhane (2018), Durgeshgorer Guptodhon (2019), Golondaaj (2021) and Karnasubarner Guptodhon (2023). On 5 January 2025, Nilayan Chatterjee and Rathijit Bhattacharjee were featured during muhurat of the film, thereby confirming their inclusion to the film. It marks Nilayan and Rathijit's collaborations with Dev for the sixth time after Kishmish (2022), Kachher Manush (2022), Bagha Jatin (2023), Khadaan (2024) and Dhumketu (2025), and Projapati (2022), Pradhan (2023) and Khadaan respectively.

Nilayan stated that when the film began production, expectations were high for both the film's story and its music, aiming to create a soundscape that captured the "rebel spirit" of 19th-century colonial Bengal. Rathijit, who also provided its score, was designed to reflect the duality of the protagonist—his spiritual devotion to the goddess Kali and his role as a formidable outlaw fighting British oppression. Much of the compositions were inspired from mantras, with full focus on ancient instruments such as Veena, Mridangam and Nadaswaram, and the alap that reflected Bengali traditions. Rathijit focused on high-energy, percussive arrangements for the action sequences, using traditional instruments such as the Dhak, Dhol, and Kartal. A key feature of the soundtrack is the "Raghu Raghu," which was promoted as a "Folk Rock×Trap Fusion Anthem," combining electric guitar riffs with rhythmic trap beats to appeal to a contemporary audience while maintaining the film's period authenticity. Banerjee insisted on using the Dhak not just as a festive instrument, but as a war drum. This led the composers to collaborate with traditional Dhaki (Dhak players) troupes from Birbhum and Bankura, recording raw, high-tempo rhythms that would eventually form the backbone of the film's action sequences. Apart from it, "Jhilmil Laage Re" uses acoustic arrangements, featuring the Esraj, Sarod and Flute, as a tribute to the Thumri style prevalent in 19th-century zamindari households.

Kailash Kher's raw, high-pitched delivery was paired with Nilayan's contemporary composition "Agunpakhi," a blend of semi-classical Indian music and the early stages of the Bengali folk musical. Conversely, the selection of Ishan Mitra for "Joy Kaali" was based on his ability to transition from a soft devotional baritone to a powerful high-octane crescendo.

Unlike many contemporary soundtracks that rely heavily on MIDI and samples, the Raghu Dakat score was recorded with a live 40-piece orchestra for the background score. The recording sessions took place in Kolkata. To capture the authentic "forest" atmosphere of the protagonist's hideout, several percussive tracks were recorded in open-air environments to use natural reverberation, a technique rarely used in modern Bengali film production.

== Release ==
The soundtrack preceded with five singles: "Joy Kaali" was the first to be released on 27 August 2025, followed by "Jhilmil Laage Re" on 6 September 2025, "Raghu Raghu" on 24 September, and "Agunpakhi" on 1 October 2025. The soundtrack album was released on 21 September 2025, four days before the film's release.

== Track listing ==
Track listing
No.	Title	Lyrics	Music	Singer(s)	Length
1.	"Joy Kaali"	Sugata Guha	Rathijit Bhattacharjee	Ishan Mitra; Shreya Bhattacharjee; Rathijit Bhattacharjee	3:45
2.	"Jhilmil Laage Re"	Prasen	Nilayan Chatterjee	Ishan Mitra; Shuchismita Chakraborty	3:39
3.	"Raghu Raghu"	Barish		Rathijit Bhattacharjee	2:48
4.	"Agunpakhi"	Nilayan Chatterjee		Kailash Kher; Nilayan Chatterjee	4:13
Total length:					15:25

== Personnel ==
=== Backing Vocals ===
Crowd chorus: Ankit Malakar, Soumyabrata banerjee, Suman Das, Ayan Dhar, Sohan Bhattacharjee, Ritwik Paul, Mahul Nath, Debarghya Sengupta, Pralay Halder, Silajit Konar, Souparna Sarkar, Meghasree Mukherjee, Patrali Pramanik, Devjit

=== Personnel ===
Song	Personnel
"Joy Kaali"	Ethnic Winds: Nirmalyo Humtoo Dey; Ethnic percussions: Dipesh Varma; Guitar, Oud: Jakiruddin Khan
"Jhilmil Laage Re"	Flute: Subhamoy Ghosh
"Raghu Raghu"	Ethnic percussion: Dipesh Verma
"Agunpakhi"	Flute: Subhamoy Ghosh; Traditional string instruments: Shamik Chakravarty

=== Production ===
- Music Directors: Nilayan Chatterjee, Rathijit Bhattacharjee
- Background Score: Rathijit Bhattacharjee
- Lyricists: Sugata Guha, Prasen, Barish, Nilayan Chatterjee
- Programming & Arrangement: Shamik Chakraborty, Kalam
- Rhythm Design: Rupam Percussionist, Arnab Das
- Mixing & Mastering: Shiladittiya Sarkar (BBay Studios, Mumbai)
- Live Percussions: Birbhum Dhaki ensemble
- Music Label: SVF Music
