= Tekka (film) =

2024 Bengali film by Srijit Mukherji

- Theatrical release poster
- Directed by: Srijit Mukherji
- Screenplay by: Bhaskar Chattopadhyay; Srijit Mukherji
- Dialogues by: Srijit Mukherji
- Story by: Bhaskar Chattopadhyay
- Produced by: Gurupada Adhikari; Dev
- Starring: Dev; Tota Roy Chowdhury; Paran Bandopadhyay; Swastika Mukhopadhyay; Rukmini Maitra
- Cinematography: Modhura Palit
- Edited by: Pronoy Dasgupta
- Music by: Ranajoy Bhattacharjee
- Production company: Dev Entertainment Ventures
- Distributed by: PVR Inox Pictures
- Release date: 8 October 2024
- Running time: 135:29 minutes
- Country: India
- Language: Bengali
- Budget: ₹3 crore
- Box office: ₹8 crore

Tekka (/tɛkə/ transl. Ace) is a 2024 Indian Bengali-language vigilante action thriller film co-written and directed by Srijit Mukherji. Produced by Gurupada Adhikari and Dev under the banner of Dev Entertainment Ventures, the film is based on a story of the same name by Bhaskar Chattopadhyay, which itself is loosely inspired from the West Bengal School Service Commission recruitment scam (2022). It stars an ensemble cast consisting of Dev, Swastika Mukherjee, Rukmini Maitra, Paran Bandyopadhyay, Sujan Mukherjee, Aryann Bhowmik, Sreeja Dutta and Aameya Bose in her debut, with Kaushik Sen, Tota Roy Chowdhury, Sudeshna Roy and Srijit Mukherji himself in special appearances. The film follows Iqlakh, a poor janitor, who kidnaps a little girl and takes her hostage for 48 hours in order to demand his lost job.

The film was officially announced in August 2023 under the tentative title Dev 45, as it is the actor's 45th film as the lead actor, and the official title was announced in December 2023. Principal photography commenced in January 2024 in Kolkata. The film marks Srijit Mukherji's second collaboration with Dev and fourth collaboration with Swastika Mukherjee. Music of the film is composed by Ranajoy Bhattacharjee, with Kabir Suman as guest composer, and background score by Diptarka Bose, with lyrics penned by Suman and Bhattacharjee himself for their respective tracks, along with Barish. Modhura Palit handled the cinematography while Pranoy Dasgupta did the editing.

Tekka was released worldwide on 8 October 2024 on the occasion of Durga Puja. It opened to positive reviews from the audience as well as the critics alike, mainly noted as the biggest plot twist of 2024. Grossing over 8 crore, it became a box-office hit and emerged as the third highest grossing Bengali film of 2024.

== Plot ==
Iqlakh Alam is a poor janitor who has lost his job. He realises that poor people have basically no existence for the rich. Disillusioned by the mistreatment of the poor by the rich, he plans his revenge against the rich strata. One day, he kidnaps Avantika, a schoolgirl, from St. Benjamin School while she was returning home. Pointing a gun at her head, he takes control of an office building in Sector V and holds her hostage on the ninth floor.

A team of cops from the crime branch led by ACP Maya has been assigned the task to save the child from his hands. While Iqlakh negotiates his demands with Maya, it turns out that he does not want any ransom but just wants his job back. She adheres to her duty, despite having pain due to injections for having a baby via IVF. She is struck between her dreams of motherhood and her high-stress job. She learns that Iqlakh used to work in that same office building. Due to a small argument with the higher authorities, he was fired. Tormented, he turned a kidnapper the next day and kidnapped the girl. Brishti is a young journalist and Tintin is her cameraman. Brishti and Tintin, coincidentally trapped in the same building and desperate to impress their boss, secretly film the events happening there.

Ira is the kidnapped girl's mother. She is ready to pay any amount to save her daughter. But things take a turn when she kidnaps Iqlakh's son Guddu to get her daughter back. With Brishti and Tintin's help, she warns Iqlakh through a video message that whatever happens with her daughter, the same consequences will be faced by his son. Iqlakh becomes desperate and demands that his job be returned to him by Anubrata Adhikary, the owner of the company. Anubrata Adhikary is a powerful business tycoon turned politician, who, though initially reluctant, agrees to do so under public pressure.

In a final turn of events, it is revealed that the whole act was planned by Iqlakh and Ira together to avenge the murder of Ira's husband and Iqlakh's brother, Altaf Alam, a journalist who was killed by Anubrata for exposing his corruption of drugs smuggling. Anubrata confesses to his crimes, which is recorded live by Brishti and Tintin. The situation returns to normal, with Anubrata being tried for his crimes, Brishti leaving her toxic job to become a teacher, Maya successfully giving birth to her baby, and Iqlakh and Ira happily raising their respective kids, thus executing the vengeance.

== Cast ==
- Dev as Iqlakh Alam, a janitor working in Diamond Developers(Jack)
- Swastika Mukherjee as Ira Sengupta (Queen), Iqlakh's elder sister-in-law
- Rukmini Maitra as ACP Maya Khastogir (King)
- Paran Bandopadhyay as politician and industrialist Anubrata Adhikary, owner of Diamond Developers
- Aameya Bose as Avantika
- Aryann Bhowmik as Tintin
- Sreeja Dutta as Brishti
- Lokenath Dey as SI Kallol Guha
- Kamaleswar Mukherjee as JCP Rajat Majumdar
- Sujan Neel Mukherjee as Mr Ghosh, News anchor and the owner of Sky News
- Anujoy Chatterjee as Anubrata Adhikari's maintenance manager
- Biswajit Ghosh as Joe

=== Special appearance ===
- Kaushik Sen as Altaf Alam, journalist
- Tota Roy Chowdhury as Rajiv Sanyal, Maya's husband
- Srijit Mukherji as Mr. Arjun Puri, former ATS chief
- Sudeshna Roy as Mrs. Mitali Sharma

== Production ==
=== Development ===
In June 2023, it was reported that Dev would reunite with Srijit Mukherji for the biopic of Nawab Siraj-ud-Daulah in his second collaboration seven years after Zulfiqar (2016). Later it was clarified by Dev to be a rumour through the #AskDev session on Twitter. According to him, he had no discussions with Mukherji about the biopic. He also confirmed that he had no plans of working with the director that time. On 7 July 2023, Dev revealed that he would be collaborating with Mukherji through a post on Twitter, but not for that biopic, under his banner of Dev Entertainment Ventures.

When asked about the subject matter of their film, Srijit Mukherji said that several scripts have been narrated to Dev, but nothing had been finalized. Initially it was rumoured to be a gangster drama on the life of Markus, the character portrayed by Dev in Zulfiqar. Later in December 2023, the film was revealed to be a hostage thriller. Coinciding with Dev's 40th birthday on 25 December 2023, the film's title was officially announced to be Tekka with a poster which previously had the working title Dev 45, as it was his 45th film as an actor.

=== Pre-production ===
Tekka was originally based on a story of the same name written by Bhaskar Chattopadhyay, the teacher of screenwriting at York University of Canada. Although he initially considered the story for a Hindi film, he later sold the rights for a Bengali film at Mukherji's request and unable to resist the temptation of working with Dev as a screenwriter. The screenplay of the film was taken down within five days by him, while Mukherji had done some minor changes to it.

"Timing is the key to a successful screenplay. I wrote Tekka in the form of a novel about ten years ago. Later, it was transformed into a screenplay within five days due to the pre-production of the film[...] I wrote such an informative script within five days that Srijit didn't have to make any major changes to it later. After spending sleepless nights, unable to pass up the tempting opportunity to work with Dev, I stopped writing it completely.

— Bhaskar Chattopadhyay in an interview to Anandabazar Patrika

Tekka's pre-production began in December 2023, when Mukherji chose to work with cinematographer Soumik Halder, with whom he had frequently worked on his earlier films. Due to scheduling conflicts, Halder left the production and was replaced by Modhura Palit, who had appeared in Dev Entertainment Ventures' previous projects Kishmish (2022) and Kachher Manush (2022).

=== Casting ===
The film's production house confirmed the collaboration between Mukherji and Dev by releasing the official poster of the film along with the pivotal names in the cast on their social media handles on 25 December 2023. Swastika Mukherjee was roped in to play the character of a police officer, but later she was selected to play the role of the kidnapped child's mother. Filming began in 2024. After being suspended for the 2024 general elections in India; the rest of the filming was completed after the general elections.

== Music ==
The music of the film has been composed by Ranajoy Bhattacharjee. The lyrics have been penned by Ranajoy Bhattacharjee and Barish.

The first song "Tomay Chhere Jete Parlam Koi" was released on 23 September 2024. The second single "Taasher Deshe" was released on 2 October 2024 on the occasion of Mahalaya. The third single "Tomay Chhere Jete Parlam Koi (Female Version)" was released on 8 October 2024.

== Marketing ==
The first look posters of the principle characters with their names in the movie were released in September 2024. Rukmini Maitra's first look poster, revealing her name "Maya" in the film was released on 1 September 2024. Swastika Mukherjee's first look poster, introducing her as "Ira" was released on 8 September 2024. Dev's first look poster was dropped on 10 September 2024, introducing him as "Iqlakh".

The release poster featuring the lead characters in the film was released on 11 September 2024. The teaser was released on 13 September 2024 on Dev Entertainment Ventures official YouTube channel. At the teaser launch event at a mall in South Kolkata, the producers informed that for the first time in Bengal film industry, sync sound technology has been used in the film. The first song was launched on 23 September 2024 at an event in South Kolkata, on the director's birthday. The trailer was launched at a mall in Kolkata on 28 September 2024.

As a part of the promotions, Dev and Srijit Mukherji sold tickets at the ticket counter of SVF Baruipur. The film also marked the reopening of the iconic Globe Cinemas in New Market, Kolkata, after being shut down for 20 years. On the reopening ceremony, Dev and Srijit Mukherji sold the tickets for Tekka from the hall counter.

== Release ==
=== Theatrical ===
The film was released in the theatres on 8 October 2024, on the occasion of Durga Puja, with 276 shows.

=== Pre release rights ===
The music rights of the film was acquired by Saregama Bengali. The film and collected over ₹2 crore before its release from the digital, music and satellite rights.

=== Home media ===
The post-theatrical satellite rights of the film was acquired by Star Jalsha. It was premiered on 22 December 2024. The digital streaming rights was acquired by Hoichoi. It will be premiered on 27 December 2024.

== Reception ==
=== Box office ===
With over 100+ almost houseful shows on Saptami, 70+ houseful and almost houseful shows on Ashtami, 105 houseful and almost houseful shows on Navami, the film has collected over ₹1.5 crore in the first 3 days and grossed over ₹2.75 crore in six days. It netted almost ₹3 crore in the first week. After two weeks, its collections stood at ₹3.22 crore. At the end of 18 days, it had collected ₹4.10 crore. By the third week, it has grossed over ₹4.55 crore. At the end of its theatrical run, the film grossed over ₹6.1 crore at the box office against a production budget of ₹3 crore.

=== Critical reception ===
Poorna Banerjee of the Times of India rated the film 3.5 out of 5 stars and wrote that it belongs to the genre of Srijit's films like Vinci Da, Dwitiyo Purush or Chotushkone. He praised Srijit's direction, the script, acting and cinematography but criticized the slow pace in second half, use of too many dialogues and questionable decisions taken by the protagonist throughout the film. Sudeep Ghosh of Anandabazar Patrika rated the film 8 out of 10 stars and wrote "Tekka is a commercial Bengali hostage thriller film including all the mass masala elements." He mentioned that: intense plot, unexpected twists, good acting and complex situations, the film had everything. He also praised the dialogues, screenplay, songs, background score and the fluent acting of everyone in their respective roles.

Agnivo Niyogi of The Telegraph reviewed the film and wrote "Tekka is a nerve-wracking hostage thriller, anchored by a nuanced performance from Dev in a de-glam avatar. Dev as Iqlakh, delivers perhaps the finest performance of his career." He praised the acting mettle of Rukmini and Swastika and how they skillfully portray the complexity of their feelings. He also praised Srijit's dialogues and screenplay, Modhura Palit's urban landscape cinematography and Diptarka's background score. Biswadip Dey of Sangbad Pratidin reviewed the film and wrote "Dev and Srijit Mukherjee are the two nuclear factors of the film." He praised Mukherjee's engrossing screenplay, the songs and specially the background score, which aptly complements the scenes. He also praised the acting of the whole cast, specially Dev, Rukmini and Swastika's dimensional acting skills and mentioned it to be one of the pillars in the film.

Anurupa Chakraborty of the Indian Express rated the film 4 out of 5 stars and wrote "Every actor's acting along with the two child actors, combined with the tight screenplay by Srijit Mukherjee and Palit's cinematography is the heart of the film." She praised the climax of the film, the indulging script and the strong writing for all the characters. Bhaswati Ghosh of TV9 Bangla reviewed the film and wrote "The tone of the film is not for the celebration of happiness on Durga Puja. It merges with the tone of protests." She praised the strong character of Dev, the emotionally layered acting of Swastika and Rukmini, the dialogues and the climax.

Shamayita Chakraborty of OTTplay rated the film 3 out of 5 stars and wrote "Tekka is a thrilling but one-time watch." She praised the acting, direction, dialogues, cinematography, songs and BGM but criticized the storyline, the storytelling, unnecessary guest appearance and the not appropriate title of the film as per the plot. She mentioned it to be heavily banking on Dev's stardom. Subhodeep Bandyopadhyay of The Wall rated the film 7.5 out of 10 stars and wrote "Tekka is a voice against the mistreatment of the poor strata of people. Despite some parts being unrealistic, it is a paisa-vasool film." He praised the intense script but criticized it for losing logic at certain parts. He praised the acting of Rukmini, Swastika, the supporting cast, the songs, cinematography and also mentioned this to be one of the finest acting in Dev's career.

Deboleena Ghosh of Ei Samay rated the film 3.5 out of 5 stars and wrote "The film speaks about the sharp divide in the society between the rich and the poor." She praised the music, songs and acting of the whole cast, specially Dev, Rukmini and Paran Bandyopadhyay. But she criticised the loopholes in screenplay and the slow first half. Subhasmita Kanji of Hindustan Times rated the film 3.7 out of 5 stars and wrote she was disappointed with the first half but the second half compensated it. Besides praising the acting, direction, dialogues, twist at the climax, songs and cinematography, she specially applauded Dev for his expressions. Kolkata TV reviewed the film and wrote "Srijit's Pujo release is filled with twists after twists." They mentioned that the slow pace of the first half is compensated in the second half along with the climax. They praised the acting skills of the whole cast, the music, background score, cinematography and the dialogues.

== Awards ==
- Timir Biswas won Best Male Playback Singer for Tekka at 8th WBFJA Awards, 2025
