= Mon Mane Na =

- Mon Mane Na (transl. Heart Won't Listen) may refer to:
- Mon Mane Na (1992 film), an Indian Bengali-language film directed by Indar Sen and starring Prosenjit
- Mon Mane Na (2008 film), an Indian Bengali-language film directed by Sujit Guha and starring Dev and Koyel Mullick
- Mon Mane Na (TV series), 2021-2022 Indian series starring Pallavi Dey, Samm Batyacharyya, and Anjana Basu
- Mon Maaney Na (2026 Bengali Film), an Indian Bengali-language film directed by Rahool Mukherjee.
