= Dhumketu (soundtrack) =

2025 soundtrack album by Anupam Roy, Indraadip Dasgupta and Nilayan Chatterjee

Soundtrack album by Anupam Roy, Indraadip Dasgupta and Nilayan Chatterjee
- Recorded: 2016–2025
- Studios: Audio Lake, Kolkata; Ananjan's Studio, Kolkata
- Genre: Feature Film Soundtrack
- Length: 30:47
- Language: Bengali
- Label: Saregama India
- Producers: Anupam Roy, Indraadip Dasgupta and Nilayan Chatterjee

Anupam Roy chronology
Chandrabindoo (2025)	Dhumketu (2025)	Raktabeej 2 (2025)

Indraadip Dasgupta chronology
Grihapravesh (2025)	Dhumketu (2024)	Lawho Gouranger Naam Rey (2025)

Nilayan Chatterjee chronology
Khadaan (2024)	Dhumketu (2025)	Raghu Dakat (2025)

Dhumketu is the official soundtrack album to the 2025 Indian Bengali-language romantic thriller film of the same name, directed by Kaushik Ganguly, and starring Dev and Subhashree Ganguly in lead roles. The film’s songs were composed primarily by Anupam Roy, with additional compositions by Indraadip Dasgupta and Nilayan Chatterjee, whereas Dasgupta also provided its original score.

The album is notable for its unusually long production cycle; while most of the songs were recorded in 2016, the soundtrack remained unreleased for nearly a decade due to production delays, finally debuting on 7 July 2025, under the Saregama India label.

== Background and development ==
The musical development for Dhumketu began in late-2015 when director Kaushik Ganguly collaborated with Anupam Roy maidenly. Ganguly wanted the music to reflect the film's theme of long-distance longing and the passage of time.

The lead single, "Gaane Gaane," featuring Arijit Singh and Shreya Ghoshal, was recorded in early 2016. It was famously filmed at Khoorpatal, Nainital, in November 2015, featuring lead actors Dev and Subhashree Ganguly. However, the film and its soundtrack entered a state of limbo for nearly nine years due to a well-publicized legal and financial fallout between producer Rana Sarkar and Dev, who was also the co-producer of the film. During this hia tus, the recorded songs became a subject of urban legend among fans, with leaked snippets occasionally appearing online.

In May 2025, following a resolution of the disputes, the project was revived. The producers decided to keep the original recordings intact to preserve the "vintage mid-2010s" flavor of Anupam’s acoustic-heavy arrangements, while adding two new tracks by Nilayan Chatterjee to modernize the album's appeal. Indraadip Dasgupta, who was initially to provide the score only, also composed for the soundtrack.

== Release ==
The soundtrack preceded with seven tracks: "Gaane Gaane" was the first to be released on 7 July 2025, which was followed by "Maa" on 24 July 2025, "Hobe Na Dekha?" on 1 August 2025, "Smriti Phatoley" on 19 August 2025, "Nei Kono Dewa Newa" on 26 August 2025, and "Gaane Gaane–Reprise" on 11 December 2025.

== Track listing ==
Track listing
No.	Title	Lyrics	Music	Singer(s)	Length
1.	"Gaane Gaane"	Anupam Roy	Anupam Roy	Arijit Singh, Shreya Ghoshal	4:59
2.	"Maa"	Anupam Roy	Anupam Roy	Anupam Roy	3:50
3.	"Hobe Na Dekha?"	Anupam Roy	Anupam Roy	Ishan Mitra	4:14
4.	"Smriti Phatoley"	Anupam Roy	Anupam Roy	Nachiketa Chakraborty	2:54
5.	"Nei Kono Dewa Newa"	Ritam Sen	Indraadip Dasgupta	Armaan Rashid Khan	6:19
6.	"Dhumketu Hoye Eso"	Nilayan Chatterjee	Nilayan Chatterjee	Nilayan Chatterjee and Shuchismita Chakraborty	3:32
7.	"Gaane Gaane–Reprise"	Anupam Roy	Anupam Roy	Anupam Roy	4:59
Total length:					30:47

== Critical reception ==
The soundtrack received overwhelmingly positive reviews. Agnivo Niyogi of The Telegraph gave the album 4.5/5 stars, stating, "Anupam’s melodies from 2016 have aged like fine wine; Arijit and Shreya’s duet is a reminder of why they remain the gold standard of playback singing." Sampali Moulik Sangbad Pratidin noted that the addition of Nachiketa Chakraborty's "Smriti Phatoley" added a "haunting gravitas" that perfectly complemented Kaushik Ganguly’s storytelling.

== Personnel ==
- Music Directors: Anupam Roy, Indraadip Dasgupta, Nilayan Chatterjee
- Lyricists: Anupam Roy, Ritam Sen, Nilayan Chatterjee
- Music Arrangement: Nabarun Bose, Shamik Chakravarty
- Guitars: Subhodip Banerjee, John Paul
- Mixed & Mastered: Anindit Roy
- Label: Saregama India
