= Nilayan Chatterjee =

Indian music composer and singer

- Also known as: RJ Neil
- Born: c. 1990
- Origin: Kolkata, West Bengal, India
- Genres: Bengali folk; Pop; Lo-fi
- Occupations: Radio jockey; Composer; Singer; Songwriter; Lyricist
- Instruments: Vocals; Piano; Guitar
- Years active: 2007–present
- Labels: Sony Music; Zee Music Company; Saregama; SVF; Surinder Films; Grassroot Entertainment

Nilayan Chatterjee (pronounced [nilajan cʰɔtterʤeɛ]; born c. 1990), also known by his stage name RJ Neil, is an Indian radio jockey, music composer, singer-songwriter, and lyricist who works in the Bengali film industry and independent music scene. He is best known for composing soundtracks for films such as Kacher Manush (2022), Bagha Jatin (2023), Dilkhush (2023), Boomerang (2024), and Khadaan (2024).

== Early life and education ==
Chatterjee was born around 1990 in Kolkata, West Bengal. Details about his early life and formal musical training are not extensively documented. He began his career in radio in 2007.

== Career ==
=== Radio career ===
Chatterjee began his career as a radio jockey in 2007, hosting the late-night Hindi show Masala Nights on Red FM Kolkata under the name RJ Neil. His show featured innovative segments including "Dark Hour," which allowed anonymous listener confessions, and "Instant song creation," where he would compose songs on-the-spot using random words provided by listeners.

His radio promotion performance "Dedicated to DEV & RUKMINI" in 2019 caught the attention of actor Dev, which facilitated his transition into film music composition.

=== Music career ===
Chatterjee made his film composition debut with the 2022 romantic comedy Kishmish, where he composed all the songs and also wrote lyrics. He continued his collaboration with Dev on the romance drama Kacher Manush (2022), for which he wrote and composed the lead single "Chumbak Mon", sung by Usha Uthup.

His work on the patriotic biopic Bagha Jatin (2023) included composing title tracks such as "Jago Re Bagha" and "Ei Desh Amar." During this project, Chatterjee received guidance and mentorship from composer A. R. Rahman.

In 2023, he scored the anthology romance Dilkhush, which featured the hit track "Bibagi Phone". His 2024 projects include the thriller Boomerang and the supernatural drama Khadaan, for which he also served as co-producer alongside Dev.

Following their work on Khadaan, Chatterjee collaborated again with composer–singer Rathijit Bhattacharjee on the soundtrack of the period action film Raghu Dakat, starring Dev and directed by Dhrubo Banerjee. The film's music contributed to his growing popularity, and he participated in promotional tours across several districts of West Bengal alongside actor Dev.

The collaboration followed the popularity of the song "Kishori" from Khadaan, which became widely popular among younger listeners. Bhattacharjee provided vocals for the track alongside singer Antara Mitra

In 2026, he composed five songs for Rahool Mukherjee's Mon Maaney Na (2026 Bengali Film), marking the third collaboration between the director-music director duo. This film marks the debut of Ritwik Bhowmik in Bengali cinema as well as Hiya Chatterjee.

Chatterjee has collaborated with prominent playback singers including Sonu Nigam, who reportedly returned his fee after recording a song for one of Chatterjee's projects upon learning it was for an independent film with a limited budget.

On World Music Day 2023, Chatterjee shared his perspectives on the evolving Bengali music industry and the balance between commercial success and creative expression.

=== Independent music ===
Alongside his film work, Chatterjee has released independent music including lo-fi singles and EPs. His track "Apatoto Jai" was featured in a lo-fi version by The Times of India. He also released the Kacher Manush Original Motion Picture Soundtrack EP in 2022.

== Personal life ==
Chatterjee was previously married to radio jockey RJ Ayantika. The couple announced their separation and Ayantika's second marriage in 2023. Despite their separation, they maintained a cordial relationship and were seen together at a friend's wedding after their divorce.

== Discography ==
=== Film scores ===
Year	Title	Role	Notes
2022	Kishmish	Composer and lyricist	Debut as film composer
2022	Kacher Manush	Composer and lyricist	Featured "Chumbak Mon" sung by Usha Uthup
2023	Bagha Jatin	Composer	Received mentorship from A. R. Rahman
2023	Dilkhush	Composer and lyricist	
2024	Boomerang	Composer	
2024	Khadaan	Composer	
2025	Dhumketu	Composer and lyricist	
2025	Raghu Dakat	Composer	
2026	Mon Maaney Na (2026 Bengali Film)	Composer and lyricist	
2026	Bike Ambulance Dada	Composer and lyricist	Upcoming project

=== Singles and EPs ===
Year	Title	Format
2022	Kacher Manush (Original Motion Picture Soundtrack)	EP
2023	"Apatoto Jai"	Single
2024	"Sajani – LoFi"	Single

== Reception ==
Chatterjee's score for Bagha Jatin was praised for its patriotic fervor and thematic coherence by The Times of India. His work has been recognized for blending traditional Bengali folk elements with contemporary musical arrangements.
