= Raghu Dakat =

2025 Indian Bengali action-adventure film by Dhrubo Banerjee

- Theatrical release poster
- Directed by: Dhrubo Banerjee
- Written by: Dhrubo Banerjee
- Screenplay by: Dhrubo Banerjee
- Story by: Dhrubo Banerjee
- Produced by: Dev; Gurupada Adhikari; Shrikant Mohta; Mahendra Soni
- Starring: Dev; Anirban Bhattacharya; Om Sahani; Sohini Sarkar; Idhika Paul; Roopa Ganguly; Alexx O'Nell; Carl A. Harte
- Narrated by: Anujoy Chatterjee
- Cinematography: Soumik Halder
- Edited by: Md. Kalam
- Music by: Nilayan Chatterjee; Rathijit Bhattacharjee
- Production companies: Shree Venkatesh Films; Dev Entertainment Ventures
- Distributed by: Shree Venkatesh Films
- Release date: 25 September 2025
- Running time: 152 minutes
- Country: India
- Language: Bengali
- Budget: ₹8 crore
- Box office: est.₹13 crore

Raghu Dakat (Bengali pronunciation: [ɾɔɡʱu ɖakat]) is a 2025 Indian Bengali-language epic period folk superhero film written and directed by Dhrubo Banerjee. Produced by Shrikant Mohta, Mahendra Soni, Gurupada Adhikari and Dev under the banners of Shree Venkatesh Films and Dev Entertainment Ventures, the film stars Dev himself in the titular role as a notorious 18th-century outlaw turned folk hero. It also features Anirban Bhattacharya, Om Sahani, Sohini Sarkar, Idhika Paul and Roopa Ganguly in other pivotal roles. The film is a fictionalised tale set in the backdrop of the Indigo revolt (1859–1860), during colonial unrest in Bengal.

Banerjee conceptualised the film by reimagining the life and legends of Raghab Dutta, who later turned into Raghu Dakat as a formidable force uniting to battle British colonial rule. Announced in November 2021, the film was stalled in the development phase for four years and later reannounced in December 2024. It marks Banerjee's collaborations with Dev and Bhattacharya for the second and fourth time respectively. It also pairs Dev and Paul for the second time. Principal photography commenced in January 2025, primarily in Purba Bardhaman and Jharkhand. The music has been composed by Rathijit Bhattacharjee and Nilayan Chatterjee, the background score is done by Rathijit Bhattacharjee did the background score while the cinematography and editing were handled by Soumik Halder and MD. Kalam respectively.

Raghu Dakat released in the theatres on 25 September 2025, coinciding with Durga Puja. The film received positive reviews from critics and became a commercial success at the box office. It emerged as the second highest-grossing Bengali film of 2025.

== Plot ==
Set in Bengal during the decades following the Sepoy Mutiny, the film begins with an aged Damru narrating events to villagers gathered by torchlight. He describes how British indigo planters, supported by local landlords, force peasants into exploitative contracts, sometimes using the peasants’ bloodied fingerprints as signatures. When a farmer refuses to comply, British officer Duncan orders a public hanging to intimidate the villagers.

The execution is interrupted by Raghu, an outlaw devoted to Kali, who defeats the mercenaries of Ahindra Barman, the zamindar of Rudrapur. Raghu humiliates Duncan but spares his life, telling him to remember his name. Rumors about Raghu grow after a captured mercenary claims Raghu is the son of Maa Kali, and his actions take on legendary status. A ritual dance follows, and it is revealed by Kalu Ustad that Ahindra is sending all taxes and indigo harvests to Duncan's factory. Raghu intervenes when he learns of girls being abducted under Ahindra's protection, Raghu rescues the abducted girls and on their way back meets Saudamini at Mahadevpur, a skilled fighter. Raghu develops feelings for Saudamini, which initially strains his relationship with his longtime companion Gunja, but they later reconcile with the guidance of Dakat Ma.

Raghu's successes lead villagers to see him as a messianic figure, although information about his band is unwittingly passed to Durlav, a sadhu secretly working for Ahindra and the British. Raghu is haunted by memories of Ahindra and Duncan hanging his father in front of him. Raghu, Gunja, and Saudamini later prevent another execution in Rudrapur. The group suffers a setback when Durlav murders Dakat Ma and sets a trap that injures Raghu, who is presumed dead. Durlav attempts to kill Raghu at a Kali gathering, but Raghu survives and kills Durlav. With their hideout exposed, the group relocates to the mountains.

At Ahindra's estate, confusion arises when he receives a letter from the King of Nawabgunj requesting donations of jewelry for a Maa Kali ritual. Ahindra soon understands that Raghu has already raided the wedding of King Bikram Roy's daughter. During the raid, Raghu addresses the royal family, delivering a speech about redistributing wealth taken from the poor. In response, Bikram Roy's wife asks for a peaceful resolution, and the king's daughter is moved to tears. The royal family, including the king, ultimately chooses to donate their jewelry voluntarily. The redistributed wealth is given to the peasants, further establishing Raghu's reputation among both the oppressed and the powerful.

Enraged by the raid, Ahindra instructs his manager to target Raghu's supporters. Gunja and Saudamini are ambushed during their return; Gunja is fatally stabbed, and Saudamini is captured and taken to a ship. In response, Raghu and his allies pursue Lokenath and Duncan to Duncan's indigo factory. During the confrontation, Bhimraj and the rebels kill Lokenath, and Raghu kills Duncan by whipping him and drowning him in indigo-stained water.

The final confrontation takes place on a ship, where Robert and Ferguson are killed in the ensuing battle. Raghu manages to rescue Saudamini, but is stabbed from behind by Ahindra. Believing Raghu to be dead, Ahindra boasts to Saudamini, but Raghu recovers, stabs Ahindra, and kills him. As the ship catches fire, Raghu and Saudamini escape.

The film concludes with a title card explaining that, following the Indigo Revolt and the Indigo Committee's report, the Indigo Act of 1862 was passed, ending forced indigo cultivation in Bengal.

== Cast ==
- Dev as Raghu Dakat / Raghab Dutta / Raja, a notorious outlaw and folk hero
  - Ayush Banerjee as child Raghu
- Anirban Bhattacharya as Ahindra Barman, king of Rudrapur
- Sohini Sarkar as Gunja
- Idhika Paul as Saudamini / Moni, Raghu's love interest
- Roopa Ganguly as Dakat Maa
- Alexx O'Nell as a Duncan
- Om Sahani (credited as Om Prakash) as Durlav Roy
- Carl A. Harte as John Ferguson
- Loknath Dey as Ahindra's manager
- Anujoy Chatterjee as Damru, the narrator
- Biswaroop Biswas as Kalu Ustad
- Durbar Sharma as Fajlu
- Sumit Samadder as Petuk Thakur
- Sudip Dhara as Lakha
- Mithun Gupta as Budhon
- Arna Mukherjee as Haran Dutta, a farmer and Raghu's father
- Firdousi Bose as Dakat Maa's daughter
- Siddhartha Mondal as Jadu, Bhimraj's first assistant fighter
- Subhankar Chatterjee as Madhu, Bhimraj's second assistant fighter
- Allen Archment as Robert
- Bidyut Das as Shankar
- Mouma Naskar as Shankar's wife

=== Special appearances ===
- Ashim Roy Chowdhury as Bikram Roy, king of Nawabgunj
- Tulika Basu as Bikram's wife, queen of Nawabgunj
- Sreeja Dutta as Bikram's daughter
- John Bhattacharya as Bikram's son-in-law

== Production ==
=== Announcement and development ===
Raghu Dakat was announced in 2021 by SVF Entertainment and Dev Entertainment Ventures, with Dhrubo Banerjee as the director and writer. This marked their second collaboration after Golondaaj (2021). The story was inspired by Bengali folklore surrounding the titular character, with additional research into 200 years ago, 19th-century colonial Bengal to ensure authenticity.

The film's development faced repeated delays due to scheduling conflicts and budget finalization.It is planned to be one of the most expensive film in Bengali cinema. A concept motion poster was released on 8 November 2021. After sorting out the issues, and with Banerjee and Dev refining the script to balance historical accuracy and cinematic flair, the first poster of the film was released on 1 January 2025. In mid January 2025, Dhrubo Banerjee finished the final draft of the screenplay. Shree Venkatesh Films announced it on 5 February 2025. The film was officially re-announced at SVF's 30-year journey event "Golper Parbon 1432" on 28 February 2025.

=== Casting ===
The casting process began in 2020, with Dev confirmed for the lead role of Raghu Dakat. Dhrubo Banerjee mentioned in an interview that he approached Dev for the role of Raghu Dakat, soon after the success of Golondaaj (2021). Anirban Bhattacharya was cast in a pivotal antagonistic role. An obstacle appeared while filming his parts because the Tollywood technicians' guild decided to boycott Bhattacharya; but the issue was solved upon Dev's mediation, and the filming continued. Sohini Sarkar and Idhika Paul were selected for principle female characters. This marked the second collaboration between Dev and Idhika after Khadaan (2024). Roopa Ganguly was cast to play a significant supporting role, marking her return to Bengali cinema. Chiranjeet Chakraborty denied the rumors of him being present in the film. Alexx O'Nell and Carl A. Harte were cast as major British colonial officers. Firdousi Bose was cast in a pivotal role. Rajatava Dutta joined the cast in April 2025.

=== Pre-production ===
Pre-production involved extensive planning for the film's period setting. The team conducted location scouting in Jharkhand and Purba Bardhaman to capture the rugged landscapes of 19th-century Bengal. Dev underwent physical training to portray the physically demanding role of Raghu, including horseback riding and combat choreography. The horse riding sessions were practiced at the Kolkata Horseback Policeman Training Ground. Dev grew a long beard to suit the character of Raghu Dakat. Costume design and set construction were prioritized to recreate the colonial era authentically, with Banerjee emphasizing attention to cultural details. Dev and all the cast adapted the Bengali accent of 19th century. The mahurat of the film was done on 2 February 2025.

=== Filming ===
"A Dream we dreamt in 2021 is finally turning into Reality as we begin shoot today. This day wouldn't have been possible without my two strongest pillars Shrikant Mohta & Mahendra Soni (svf). Where we stand today as an industry, every penny counts, yet they dared to produce this magnum opus. I also must thank Dhrubo Banerjee my director for remaining loyal towards his passion for making sure this film sees the light of day, even when all I saw was darkness."

"Last but not the least, I want to thank my team of HOD's who have worked relentlessly over the past 6 months to make this project happen and create magic on celluloid. If everything goes well, get ready for the Biggest Bangla Film of 2025 and till 2025! Raghu Dakat Shoot begins today. Keep us in ur Prayers."

— Dev, sharing his experience of re-starting such a high budget film which was almost shelved due to a high budget.

Filming was initially scheduled to start from mid 2022 but was delayed owing due budget finalisation and Dev's prior schedule. It was rescheduled to start from April 2024 but was again delayed owing to date issues. Principal photography commenced on 16 March 2025, after being delayed for four years. A poster and small announcement video was released on that day, which displayed the construction of a 100 feet set for filming few horse fight scenes in the film.

Major portions were filmed in the arid regions of Jharkhand in the second schedule, chosen for their resemblance to historical Bengal's terrain. The first look poster of Dev as Raghu Dakat from the film was released on 28 March 2025, announcing the completion of the first schedule. Additional scenes were shot in the jungles of Aushgram in Purba Bardhaman. Few sequences were shot in the Aduria forests, dilapidated Kalikapur zamindar house and the adjoining Moukhira teracotta temple. Few scenes were shot in the forests of Maharashtra. Few scenes were shot in Pune. Parts of the film were shot at Bolpur and Purulia in early June, 2025. The song sequence of "Jhilmil Laage Re" has been filmed in the Krabi province of Thailand. The production team shared behind-the-scenes updates on social media, showcasing Dev's transformation and the film's large-scale action sequences. Filming wrapped in mid-2025, with a focus on capturing authentic period visuals.

== Music ==
Nilayan Chatterjee and Rathijit Bhattacharjee composed its soundtrack, in their collaborations with Dev for the sixth time after Kishmish (2022), Kachher Manush (2022), Bagha Jatin (2023), Khadaan (2024) and Dhumketu (2025), and Projapati (2022), Pradhan (2023) and Khadaan respectively. Lyrics were penned by Chatterjee himself with Sugata Guha, Prasen and Barish.

The soundtrack preceded with five singles: "Joy Kaali" was the first to be released on 27 August 2025, followed by "Jhilmil Laage Re" on 6 September 2025, "Raghu Raghu" on 24 September, and "Agunpakhi" on 1 October 2025. The soundtrack album was released on 21 September 2025, four days before the film's release.

== Marketing ==
The promotional campaign began with the release of a glimpse on 15 July 2025. The pre teaser was released on 20 July 2025. On 14 August 2025, the official teaser was attached at the end of Dhumketu screenings in West Bengal. The teaser was released on social media on 15 August 2025. A poster was released on 18 August 2025.

The makers announced "Bengal Tour" on 26 August 2025, to promote the film across several towns in West Bengal including Malda (at Brindabani Ground) on 6 September 2025, Balurghat (Balurghat High School Ground) on 6 September 2025, Raiganj (Surendranath College) on 7 September 2025, Siliguri (Vega Mall) on 8 September 2025, Howrah (Sehagori Football Ground) on 11 September 2025, Berhampore (Mohan Mall) on 12 September 2025, Purulia (Near KB Centre City Mall) on 14 September 2025, Durgapur (Junction Mall Ground) on 15 September 2025 and Madhyamgram (Star Mall) on 18 September 2025, in a Raghu Dakat themed bus, featuring the characters in giant posters all over the bus.

The trailer was launched at an event on 20 September 2025 at Netaji Indoor Stadium in Kolkata. It marked the largest trailer release event for a film in the history of the Bengali film industry. It also marked the first ever ticketed trailer release event for a Bengali film. Twenty years of Dev in Tollywood was celebrated at the event. The event marked by the presence of all of Dev's co-actresses throughout his career barring Subhashree Ganguly and Rukmini Maitra. Besides, it was attended by most of the directors with whom Dev has worked in his career. Dev announced that the money which they collected from the trailer release event will be donated to the Bengali Technicians' Welfare Fund.

== Release ==
The film was initially scheduled to release on Diwali 2021, but was delayed owing to Dev's other projects, script changes and budget issues. The new release occasion was announced on 1 January 2025. The release date was announced with a poster on 1 July 2025. Raghu Dakat theatrically released on 25 September 2025, on the eve of Durga Puja, clashing with Raktabeej 2 and Devi Chowdhurani.

== Reception ==
=== Critical reception ===
Sayani Rana of Hindustan Times rated the film 4/5 stars. She emphasised the performances of the characters in the film as that Dev's role does not seem exaggerated in any stage, Sohini's extraordinary acting deserves special praise and Anirban is a perfect hit for his character. She found the story quite entertaining, as the events and twists keep the film tense. Poorna Banerjee of The Times of India rated the film 3/5 stars and concluded that "At its core, Raghu Dakat plays out like an '80s-style action potboiler. While Dev risks typecasting in such heroic roles, the ensemble cast lifts the film into an entertaining, if uneven, experience." She considered the roles of Dev, Anirban and Sohini Sarkar's roles to be charming and compelling. She censured the film for historical instability, CGI, finale.

Anurupa Chakraborty of The Indian Express rated the film 3.5/5 stars and wrote "Raghu Dakat isn't a heist story, it is a story of hope and dream. It is a story of standing beside the poor people and inspire them to fight against the injustice served against them." She praised the power packed action sequences in the film, the background score, well written first part and the shot division but mentioned that it might get a bit tedious and repetitive till reaching the climax. She applauded Sohini, Rupa and Idhika's performances. She mentioned that the characters of Raghu Dakat and Ahindra Barman could not have been justified by anyone else better than Dev and Anirban Bhattacharya respectively and also noted that Dev's acting was more mature than his previous films and Anirban's artistry was the best among everyone.

Agnivo Niyogi of The Telegraph reviewed the film and termed it as "A South Indian mass entertainer rooted in Bengal". He opined "Unless you are a hardcore Dev fan, it will take a lot of dedication to sit through 150-odd minutes of an unabashed celebration of Dev-ian aura. Every other scene feels eerily similar to a Baahubali, Mohenjodaro or Kantara." He acclaimed the scale, the grand visuals, larger-than-life hero and villain, ornate costumes and lavish sets, massy dialogues, Anirban's performance and Banerjee's over-the-top storytelling but bemoaned the melodramatic writing and loud background score.

Shatakshi Ganguly of IWMBuzz rated the film 2.5/5 stars and highlighted "Raghu Dakat isn’t a bad film. It’s just a deeply frustrating one — because you can see what it could’ve been. The visuals are strong, but the writing falls short. A dacoit film without drama is like a gun without bullets — it might look dangerous, but it never fires." She praised Dev, Anirban and Sohini's performances, the cinematography, grand visuals and the background score but criticised the weak screenplay, dragged scenes, poor timing of songs, and the lack of intensity and rawness in the action sequences.

Arani Bhattacharya of Sangbad Pratidin noted that the shadow of South Indian period action films is visible throughout Raghu Dakat and opined that Raghu's entry scene could have been better and the backstory reveal could have been avoided. Although, she praised the makers for choosing female characters to exemplify the dilemma for a person to choose between friendship and love. Souvik Saha of Cine Kolkata rated the film 2.5/5 stars and noted "Raghu Dakat had the potential to be a gripping Bengali action-drama, but it does not deliver what the audience expects from its title." He applauded Dev's strong performance, Anirban Bhattacharya's shrewd acting in certain sequences, the background score and the grand scale but criticised the weak screenplay, uneven pacing in the second half, poor song placement and the lack of powerful action scenes.
