= Pierre Angénieux Excellens in Cinematography =

Angénieux

The Pierre Angénieux ExcelLens in Cinematography is an annual award that pays tribute to a prominent international director of photography at the Cannes Film Festival. The award originated in 2013.

The name comes from Pierre Angénieux, inventor of the retrofocus zoom mechanism and founder of the French manufacturer of high-end zoom lenses. It is not awarded to a film from the Cannes Film Festival official selection but pays tribute to a prominent director of photography whose career is commended by the industry for his/her aesthetic work.

== History ==
This award is organized by Angénieux, a French manufacturer of zoom lenses since 1935, official partner of the Cannes Film Festival. This award celebrates a cinematographer for his/her career, not as a brand ambassador. Despite his 2015 award, Roger A. Deakins acknowledged that he does not shoot with zoom lenses. The company explains this sponsorship, writing: "For more than 80 years, with their demanding aesthetics and techniques, directors of photography have secured the success of Angénieux zoom lenses. In honor, Angénieux turns the spotlight to these image professionals without whom cinema would not exist".

Since 2018, the ceremony has also recognized emerging film professionals for their contributions to cinematography.

== Awards ceremony ==
The ceremony takes place within Cannes Film Festival main venue, generally during the festival's last week (month of May), with the honoree walking on the red carpet. An overview of his/her filmography is projected, then the President of Angénieux and the Director of the festival speak along with former partners who explain their experiences and the reasons of this tribute. An Angénieux zoom lens engraved with the name of the recipient is offered as the award.

A first masterclass was organized during the 4th edition of the event with Peter Suschitzky to explain his lighting techniques and his collaboration with David Cronenberg. Since then, a masterclass prior to the awarding ceremony is part of the event.

== List of cinematographers honored with Pierre Angénieux Tribute ==
- 2013: Philippe Rousselot (AFC, ASC)
- 2014: Vilmos Zsigmond (HSC, ASC)
- 2015: Roger A. Deakins (BSC, ASC)
- 2016: Peter Suschitzky (ASC)
- 2017: Christopher Doyle (HKSC)
- 2018: Edward Lachman (ASC)
  - Promising cinematographer: Cecile Zhang, China
- 2019: Bruno Delbonnel (AFC, ASC)
  - Promising cinematographer: Modhura Palit, Calcutta, India.
- 2020: No festival due to Covid-19
- 2021: Agnès Godard (AFC)
  - Promising cinematographer: Pamela Albarrán, Mexico
- 2022: Darius Khondji (AFC, ASC)
  - Promising cinematographer: Evelin van Rei, Netherland
- 2023: Barry Ackroyd (BSC)
  - Promising cinematographer: Haya Khairat, Egypt
- 2024: Santosh Sivan (ISC, ASC)
  - Promising cinematographer: Kadri Koop, Estonia
- 2025: Dion Beebe (ACS, ASC)
  - Promising cinematographer: Eunsoo Cho
- 2026: Akiko Ashizawa (JSC)
  - Promising cinematographer: Nguyễn Phan Linh Đan, a rising Vietnamese director of photography
