= Jehanabad - Of Love & War =

Indian crime thriller web series

- Genre: Crime thriller
- Created by: Sudhir Mishra
- Written by: Rajeev Barnwal
- Directed by: Rajeev Barnwal; Satyanshu Singh
- Starring: Ritwik Bhowmik; Parambrata Chatterjee; Harshita Gaur; Rajat Kapoor
- Country of origin: India
- Original language: Hindi
- No. of seasons: 1
- No. of episodes: 10

Production
- Editor: Kamlesh Robin Parui
- Running time: 35-40 minutes
- Production company: Studio NEXT

Original release
- Network: SonyLIV
- Release: 3 February 2023

Jehanabad - Of Love & War is a SonyLIV Original, crime thriller streaming on Sony LIV, helmed by show-runner Sudhir Mishra and produced by Studio NEXT. The show has been directed by Rajeev Barnwal and Satyanshu Singh. Rajeev has also written the story, screenplay & dialogues for this series.

The main cast features Ritwik Bhowmik, Parambrata Chattopadhyay, Harshita Gaur and Rajat Kapoor

The crime thriller series has been inspired by real life incidents that took place in Bihar. The series is set in 2005. It is said to be based on the incident of 2005 Jahanabad prison attack. The show is available to watch on Sony LIV starting 3 February 2023.

== Cast ==
- Ritwik Bhowmik as Abhimanyu Singh
- Parambrata Chatterjee as Deepak Kumar
- Harshita Gaur as Kasturi Mishra
- Rajat Kapoor as Shivanand Singh
- Satyadeep Mishra as SP Durgesh Pratap Singh
- Suneel Sinha as Jagmohan Kumar A.K.A Mamaji
- Sonal Jha as Kumud Mishra
- Rajesh Jais as Rajendra Mishra
- Shikha Chauhan
- Amit Bhardwaj as SP(Giridih)Pramod Sharma

== Synopsis ==
The story follows the events of a small town in Bihar called Jehanabad, where innocent love and anarchy of the land are heading towards a collision. Set in 2005, the show has been inspired by real-life incidents. While the Naxals plan the country's biggest jailbreak to free Deepak Kumar, a seasoned Naxal commander; there is love brewing between college professor Abhimanyu Singh and his student Kasturi Mishra. The story is filled with love, loss, betrayal, and ultimately, the resilience of the human spirit. What will happen when love and war cross paths? What fate awaits the people of Jehanabad?

=== Episodic synopsis ===
Episode 1
Manzil

A notorious criminal, Deepak Kumar, is transferred to the Jehanabad jail. An ever-fragrant Kasturi is drawn to her new, righteous teacher, Abhimanyu. While romance brews in the college, violence boils in the jail.

Episode 2
Maamla

Abhimanyu and Suraj Singh, a student leader, come face to face when Suraj induces caste-based violence against a fellow student. The scuffle eventually brings Abhimanyu and Kasturi closer.

Episode 3
Santulan

Pradeep Kumar’s death splits the entire town in two — those who consider it puny and those who believe it to be an act of brutal hate crime. Will justice be served for Pradeep’s death?

Episode 4
Uljhan

Durgesh puts a beaten-up Deepak in solitary confinement whereas Kumud does the same with Kasturi as she confronts her love for Abhimanyu.

Episode 5
Raasta

A love-struck Kasturi meets unwavering resistance from her mother. In college, she faces incessant rejection from Abhimanyu. Will Kumud accept Kasturi and Abhimanyu’s love?

Episode 6
Laal Salaam

Durgesh mocks Deepak over the upcoming Naxal attack. While violence spirals out of control, what will be its impact on innocent romance?

Episode 7
Chakravyuh

Abhimanyu’s Mamaji meets Kasturi’s family and locks the date of engagement. Wedding preparations begin while the jail's security is tightened.

Episode 8
Milan

Despite their engagement and apparent closeness with Kasturi, Abhimanyu continues to use the Mishras.

Episode 9
Duvidha

Abhimanyu realises his true feelings for Kasturi. His closeness with Kasturi is also evident to Mamaji.

Episode 10
Of Love & War

Janki Kund is abuzz with the wedding. Elections begin, and the clock starts ticking. On the wedding night, while the entire town comes under siege, what is the fate that awaits Kasturi and Abhimanyu?

== Release ==
The teaser of the web series was out on 29 December 2022.

The show is available to watch on Sony LIV starting 3 February 2023.

== Reception ==
Ruchi Kaushal of Hindustan Times wrote, "The picturisation is as impactful as the screenplay and dialogues with a dash of local music adding to the mood. The story somehow looks slightly predictable if you are on an overdose of thrillers but, it is undoubtedly entertaining and doesn’t let the viewer slip for even a moment."
