= Pierre Angénieux =

French engineer and optician (born 1907)

Pierre Angénieux (French pronunciation: [pjɛʁ ɑ̃ʒenjø]; 14 July 1907 in Saint-Héand – 26 June 1998) was a French engineer and optician, one of the inventors of the modern zoom lenses, and famous for introducing the Angénieux retrofocus.

== Biography ==
Angénieux graduated from the École Nationale Supérieure d'Arts et Métiers in 1928, and from the École Supérieure d'Optique the next year. He was a student of Henri Chrétien.

After working for Pathé, Angénieux founded a company specialising in cinema equipment in 1935, Les Etablissements Pierre Angénieux. He started using Geometric optics rather than Physical optics in the design of his lenses, as Carl Zeiss and Ernst Abbe did, and developed computing methods decreasing the time needed to design a lens by an order of magnitude.

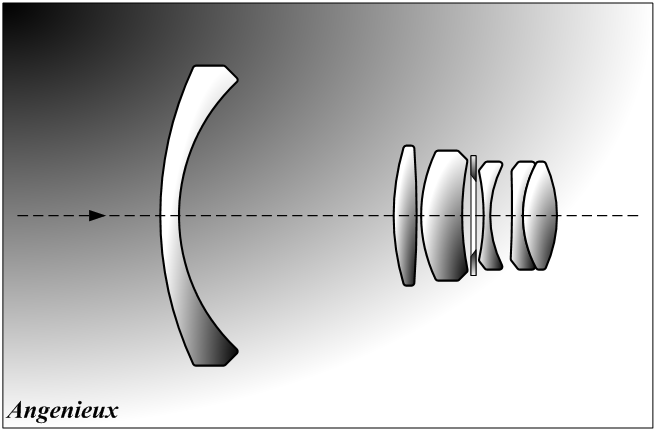
Angénieux retrofocus

In 1950, Angénieux introduced the Angénieux retrofocus, which allowed mounting wide-angle lenses on Single-lens reflex cameras.

In 1953, Angénieux designed the fastest lens of the time, reaching f/0.95. The design was used in the Bell & Howell 70 series cameras for 35 years.–

In 1956, Angénieux designed a constant aperture 17-68mm zoom lens, and a 12-120mm in 1958.

Angénieux' company provided NASA with photographic equipment used in the Ranger program, Project Gemini, Apollo program, Apollo-Soyuz Test Project and the Space Shuttle program. Notably, the first high-resolution photographs of the Moon, by Ranger 7, were made with a 25 mm f/0.95 lens.

In 1964, Angénieux received a Scientific or Technical award "for the development of a ten-to-one Zoom Lens for cinematography." He was honoured with the Grand Prix des Ingénieurs Civils in France in 1973, and with the 1989 Gordon E. Sawyer Award. His company also produced lenses for the Kodak Retinette and Pony cameras.

In 1993, Angénieux' eponymous company was acquired by Thales Group and renamed Thales Angénieux. The company still specializes in optical, electro-optical and optical-mechanic products.

Since 2013, Thales Angénieux organizes every year on the occasion of the Cannes Film Festival the Pierre Angénieux Excellens in Cinematography ceremony to pay tribute to a prominent Director of Photography for its career.
