= Modhura Palit =

Indian cinematographer

Modhura Palit (ISC) is an Indian cinematographer and director. She is the first Indian to receive the Cannes Film Festival's Pierre Angénieux ExcelLens award.

== Career ==
Palit studied cinematography at the Satyajit Ray Film and Television Institute. She is a member of the Indian Society of Cinematographers, Indian Women Cinematographers Collective, the Eastern India Cinematographers Association, and the Busan Asian Film Academy. She participated in the Looking China Youth Film Project in 2015. She was a part of Berlinale Talents 2023 for the Berlin International Film Festival. She was also on the board for the ImagineIndia International Film Festival Madrid. She was the recipient of the Shera Bangali Award for Cinema in 2024, presented by ABP Ananda.

Palit has worked on multiple feature films, web series, and other visual mediums. Her work includes films that have been both critically and commercially acclaimed. She is known for her visual work in films like Ami O Manohar, Bahadur-the Brave, Amar Colony, Tekka, Kishmish, and others. She was the director of photography for the Netflix series Kurukshetra. She had also worked on one of India's first VR projects, Black Wing, in 2018, an unreleased Indo-British production. Palit helped Watchmaker, an experimental feature film. She made her directorial debut with the episode "Troilokyo" in the Zee5 web series Ganoshotru, receiving critical and popular acclaim.

Palit advocates for the inclusion of women in the technical field of filmmaking, and serves as an academic counselling member at the Satyajit Ray Film and Television Institute as an alumna.

== Awards ==
Palit was awarded the Pierre Angénieux ExcelLens in Cinematography (Special Encouragement Award for Promising Cinematographer) at the 2019 Cannes Film Festival, making her the first Indian to win the award. She received the award alongside cinematographer Bruno Delbonnel, who received the lifetime achievement award for cinematography. With this award, she is one of the only three Indians who have received technical awards at Cannes, alongside V. Santaram and Santosh Sivan.

She won the Best Debut Director Award at the Kerala International Film Festival in 2018 for her work on Ami O Manohar, and received the Sera Bengali Award by ABP Ananda for her contribution to cinema in 2024.

Bahadur - the Brave won the New Directors category at San Sebastián International Film Festival, the first Indian film to win this award, and the Silver Gateway Award at Jio Mami Mumbai Film Festival 2023.

Amar Colony won the Special Jury award at PÖFF Tallinn Black Nights Film Festival 2022 and Best Debut Director Award at Kerala International Film festival 2022

Ek Duaa won a special mention award at the National Film Awards in 2023.

She has received PESGSPC" Honorary Membership for the Outstanding Contribution to International Art Photography by the Cyprus Pascal English School and Greek School Photography Club, and the PESGSPC Grand Progress Award "GPA - By FIAP (Fédération Internationale de l'Art Photographique).

== Filmography ==
| Year | Film | Director | Ref |
|---|---|---|---|
| 2018 | Ami O Manohar | Amitabha Chatterjee | |
| 2018 | Watchmaker | Anindya Pulak Chatterjee | |
| 2020 | Mukhosh | Arghadeep Chatterjee | |
| 2020 | Naxalbari | Partho Mitra | |
| 2021 | Ek Duaa | Ram Kamal Mukherjee | |
| 2022 | Kishmish | Rahool Mukherjee | |
| 2022 | Sahobashe | Anjan Kanjilal | |
| 2022 | Kacher Manush | Pathikrit Basu | |
| 2022 | Kothamrito | Jiit Chakraborty | |
| 2022 | Amar Colony | Siddharth Chauhan | |
| 2023 | Dilkhush | Rahool Mukherjee | |
| 2023 | Cheeni 2 | Mainak Bhaumik | |
| 2024 | Dadur Kirti | Rahool Mukherjee | |
| 2024 | Dabaru | Pathikrit Basu | |
| 2024 | Bahadur: The Brave | Diwa Shah | |
| 2024 | Tekka | Srijit Mukherji | |
| 2024 | Junior | Rahool Mukherjee | |
| 2024 | Lohu | Rahool Mukherjee | |
| 2024 | Debi | Rahool Mukherjee | |
| 2025 | Yakshi | Karan Sunil | |
| 2025 | Drusht | Aditya Chauhan | |
| 2025 | Lalaat | Jaivi Dhanda | |
| 2025 | Kurukshetra (Animation Series) | Ujaan Ganguly | |
| 2025 | Ganoshotru (Troilokyo) | Modhura Palit | |
| 2026 | Mon Maaney Na | Rahool Mukherjee | |
| 2026 | Khadaan | Visvesh Singh Sehrawat | |
