= The Whistleblower (TV series) =

Indian Hindi-language fictional web series

- Genre: Drama; Thriller
- Created by: Ritesh Modi
- Written by: Ajay Monga; Shivang Monga
- Directed by: Manoj Pillai
- Starring: Ritwik Bhowmik; Ravi Kishan; Ankitta Sharma; Ashish Verma
- Music by: Ketan Sodha
- Country of origin: India
- Original language: Hindi
- No. of seasons: 1
- No. of episodes: 9

Production
- Producers: Indranil Chakraborty; Anujeet Ghatak; Priyesh Kaushik; Kartik R. Iyer; Rohit Phale
- Editor: Dev Rao Jadhav
- Production company: Studio NEXT

Original release
- Network: SonyLIV
- Release: 16 December 2021

The Whistleblower is an Indian Hindi-language thriller web series on SonyLIV, directed by Manoj Pillai and produced by Indranil Chakraborty, Anujeet Ghatak, Priyesh Kaushik, Kartik R. Iyer, and Rohit Phale. Based on M.P Vyapam scam.

The web series is available in multiple languages - Hindi, Tamil, Telugu and Malayalam - on the SonyLIV app and was released on 16 December, exclusively on SonyLIV. It consisted of nine episodes.

== Synopsis ==
The Whistleblower revolves around Sanket, a spoilt but brilliant intern doctor, who gets tempted to become a part of a massive education racket that has been running for years. The situation, however, backfires after Sanket loses his father, and his fiance leaves him upon uncovering the truth. In a desperate attempt to identify his father's murderer, Sanket becomes a whistleblower to dig out the dark realities of the deep rot, which he once was a part of.

== Cast ==
- Ritwik Bhowmik as Dr. Sanket Bhadoria
- Ravi Kishan as Jairaj Jatav
- Ankitta Sharma as Dr. Pragya Agnihotri
- Ashish Verma as Anoop Singh
- Ridhi Khakhar as Prachi Agnihotri
- Sachin Khedekar as Dr. Ashwin Bhadoria
- Hemant Kher as Sunil Verma
- Sonali Kulkarni as Zainab Parkar
- Zakhir Hussain as Shashikant
- Bhagwan Tiwari as Roopesh Singh

== Season ==
=== Episodes ===
No. of Episodes	Title	Episode Synopsis	Originally aired
1	The First Sin	Dr. Sanket finds an illegal route to secure a medical seat and is fascinated by the whole process. He then befriends kingpin Jairaj Jatav, who heads this dangerous education racket, and unknowingly invites some irreparable troubles into his perfect life.	16 December 2021
2	Early Warning	Astonished to find his friend Dinesh swinging between the clutches of two powerful rivals, Dr. Sanket leaves no stone unturned in saving his life. However, this is just the beginning for Dr. Sanket.	16 December 2021
3	Bystander	Sanket's father, Dr. Ashwin speaking against corruption and fake medical certificates, rattles many. Clueless of its consequences, Sanket continues to get deeply entrenched into this dangerous world.	16 December 2021
4	Meritocracy Ki Maa….	Sanket's involvement in the racket affects his relationship with his girlfriend Dr. Pragya, and his father. However, he promises to get back on the right path.	16 December 2021
5	The Child Dies With Father’s Death	Jairaj brainwashes Sanket about his father's involvement in a student's suicide, for whom he had written the exam. After blaming his father, Sanket takes an overdose of drugs and wakes up to the harrowing news of Dr. Ashwin's demise.	16 December 2021
6	Face The Mirror	A mourning Sanket loses hope after finding that all the potential witnesses, who can prove Dr. Ashwin was murdered, die one after another. He soon discovers that Jairaj is responsible for all the atrocities in his life, including his father's death.	16 December 2021
7	Blowing The Whistle	Upon uncovering the truth, Sanket smartly lays a trap for all those involved in the vicious racket by teaming up with Pragya, Anup, and Zainab.	16 December 2021
8	Payback	The final plan is put to action, and even one setback can cost many lives. Sanket and Pragya, along with their team, give it all to disclose the deadly racket and those involved in it.	16 December 2021
9	Karma Is The Ultimate Bitch	All the wrongdoers, including Jairaj, are tracked. However, Sanket goes missing only to be found where it all began. This time, as a whistleblower.	16 December 2021

== Reception ==
As per The Indian Express, Ritwik plays Sanket with shrewd crookedness. Director Ritesh's greatest accomplishment here is taking the audience inside the mind of Sanket through a voiceover that explains how he perceives every situation. Ravi Kishan channels a corrupt, deceitful and uncompassionate politician with utmost dedication.

LatestLY gave The Whistleblower a rating of 3 stars while lauding all its performances and storyline. As per them, the writers have done an excellent job, especially with Sanket's character. They believe that the callous, defiant, and remorseless manner, in which his character has been drafted, makes The Whistleblower very fine.
