= Angénieux retrofocus =

Wide-angle lens for photographic camera

- Introduced in: 1950 (stills)
- Author: Pierre Angénieux (1950)
- Construction: 6 elements in 5 groups
- Aperture: f/2.5

The Angénieux retrofocus photographic lens is a wide-angle lens design that uses an inverted telephoto configuration. The popularity of this lens design made the name retrofocus synonymous with this type of lens. The Angénieux retrofocus for still cameras was introduced in France in 1950 by Pierre Angénieux.

== Inverted telephoto concept ==
The telephoto lens configuration combines positive and negative lens groups with the negative at the rear, serving to magnify the image, which reduces the back focal distance of the lens (the distance between the back of the lens and the image plane) to a figure shorter than the focal length. This is for practical, not optical reasons, because it allows telephoto lenses to be made shorter and less cumbersome. The first practical telephoto lens was developed by Peter Barlow in the early 1800s, with the eponymous Barlow lens referring to the negative achromat inserted between the eye and a telescope.

The inverted telephoto configuration does the reverse, employing one or more negative lens groups at the front to increase the back focal distance of the lens – possibly to a figure greater than the focal length – in order to allow for additional optical or mechanical parts to fit behind the lens. The negative front group also serves to increase peripheral illumination; some symmetric wide-angle lenses require a radially-graduated filter or other means to make the exposure even across the frame.

The inverted telephoto design was first employed in the 1930s by Taylor-Hobson for the early Technicolor "3-strip" cameras since the beam splitter unit behind the lens required significant space, so that a long back focal distance was essential. Horace Lee patented an inverted telephoto lens design in 1930 with an angle of view of 50° and maximum aperture of f/2 which afforded a distance between the rear element and the film plane approximately 10% greater than the focal length. Joseph Ball showed how a beam-splitting apparatus could be fitted in the space gained. Also, wide-angle lenses for narrow-gauge movie cameras had to be of this type because of the shutter mechanism that had to fit in between.

In still photography, a single-lens reflex camera requires a space for the reflex mirror, imposing a limit on the use of wide-angle lenses of symmetric designs. The retrofocus lens addressed this situation by increasing the distance between the rear element and the focal plane, thus making wider-angle lenses usable while retaining normal viewing and focusing. Unless the reflex mirror were locked in the "up" position, blacking out the viewfinder, the rearmost element(s) of a non-retrofocus (symmetric wide-angle) lens would interfere with the movement of the mirror as it flipped up and down during exposure.

== Implementation ==
Rudolf Kingslake and Paul Stevens filed for a patent in 1941 for the WA Ektanar, which featured a negative meniscus element facing the object, followed by a Tessar-derived four-element/three-group lens. However, the spacing between the first element and the following lens was relatively small and so the back focus was approximately equal to the focal length.

On 13 August 1949 Harry Zöllner and Rudolf Solisch completed the computation of the first version of the Zeiss Jena Flektogon 35 mm f/2.8. This lens was presented at the Leipzig Spring Fair from 5 to 12 March 1950 and serial production started in July 1950.

Pierre Angénieux applied for a patent in 1950. In the original patent, he presented two lenses with an angle of view of 65°, approximately equal to the view of a f=35 mm lens on the 35mm format for still cameras; the first example had a maximum aperture of f/2.5, while the second example had a maximum aperture of f/2.2. The Angénieux corporation coined the name Retrofocus for its line of inverted telephoto wide-angles, and the name has become synonymous as a generic trademark for similar lens designs.

Inverted telephoto wide-angle lens development

Taylor-Hobson 'inverted telephoto' lens by H.W. Lee (1930), GB 355,452 and US 1,955,590

Kodak WA Ektanar (35 mm f/3.5, 1941) by Kingslake & Stevens, from US Patent 2,341,385

Angénieux Retrofocus R-1 (35 mm f/2.5, 1950), from US Patent 2,649,022

Voigtländer Skoparon (35 mm f/3.5, 1952) by Tronnier, from US Patent 2,746,351

Angénieux Retrofocus R-11 (28 mm f/3.5, 1952), from US Patent 2,696,758

Enna Lithagon (35 mm f/2.5, 1953) by Lautenbacher, from US Patent 2,983,191

Schacht Travegon (35 mm f/2.5, 1954) by Bertele, from US Patent 2,772,601

Zeiss Jena Flektogon by Zöllner & Solisch (1955), from US Patent 2,793,565

Schneider Curtagon (28 mm f/4, 1955) by Klemt, from US Patent 2,824,495

Rodenstock Eurygon (35 mm f/4, 1955) by Schlegel, from DE Patent 1,017,382

Voigtländer Skoparet (35 mm f/3.4, 1956) by Determann, from US Patent 2,927,506

ISCO Westrogon (24 mm f/4, 1956) by Solisch, from US Patent 2,878,724

Carl Zeiss (Oberkochen) Distagon (35 mm f/4, 1958) by Eismann & Lange, from US Patent 3,038,380

Angénieux Retrofocus R-61 (24 mm f/3.5, 1958), from French Patent 1,214,945

Carl Zeiss (Jena) Flektogon (20 mm f/4, 1963) by Dannberg & Dietzsch, from GB Patent 978797A

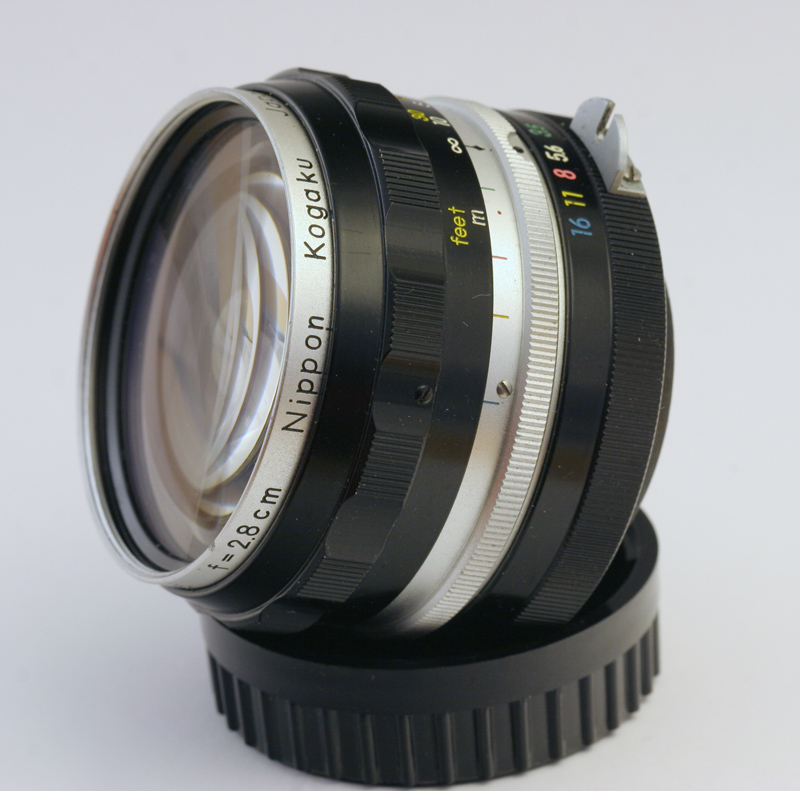
Nikon Nikkor-H f=2.8cm f/3.5 lens (early 1960s); note large front element, characteristic of inverted telephoto designs

The Angénieux Retrofocus lens line inspired other manufacturers to produce similar wide-angle lenses of this type for almost every 35mm SLR, helping to make it the definitive camera type of the late 20th century.

Similar lenses with prominent object-facing meniscus lenses were patented a few years after the original Retrofocus patent. For example, Albrecht Tronnier used the Tessar-derived Skopar lens with a single negative meniscus for the Voigtländer Skoparon of 1952. Carl Zeiss Oberkochen also created an inverted telephoto design branded Distagon (5.6/60 mm) for the Hasselblad 1000F in 1952. In 1955, Harry Zöllner and Rudolf Solisch applied for a similar patent on an inverted telephoto lens design, branded Flektogon, for Carl Zeiss Jena, which uses a single negative meniscus element ahead of a Double-Gauss lens.

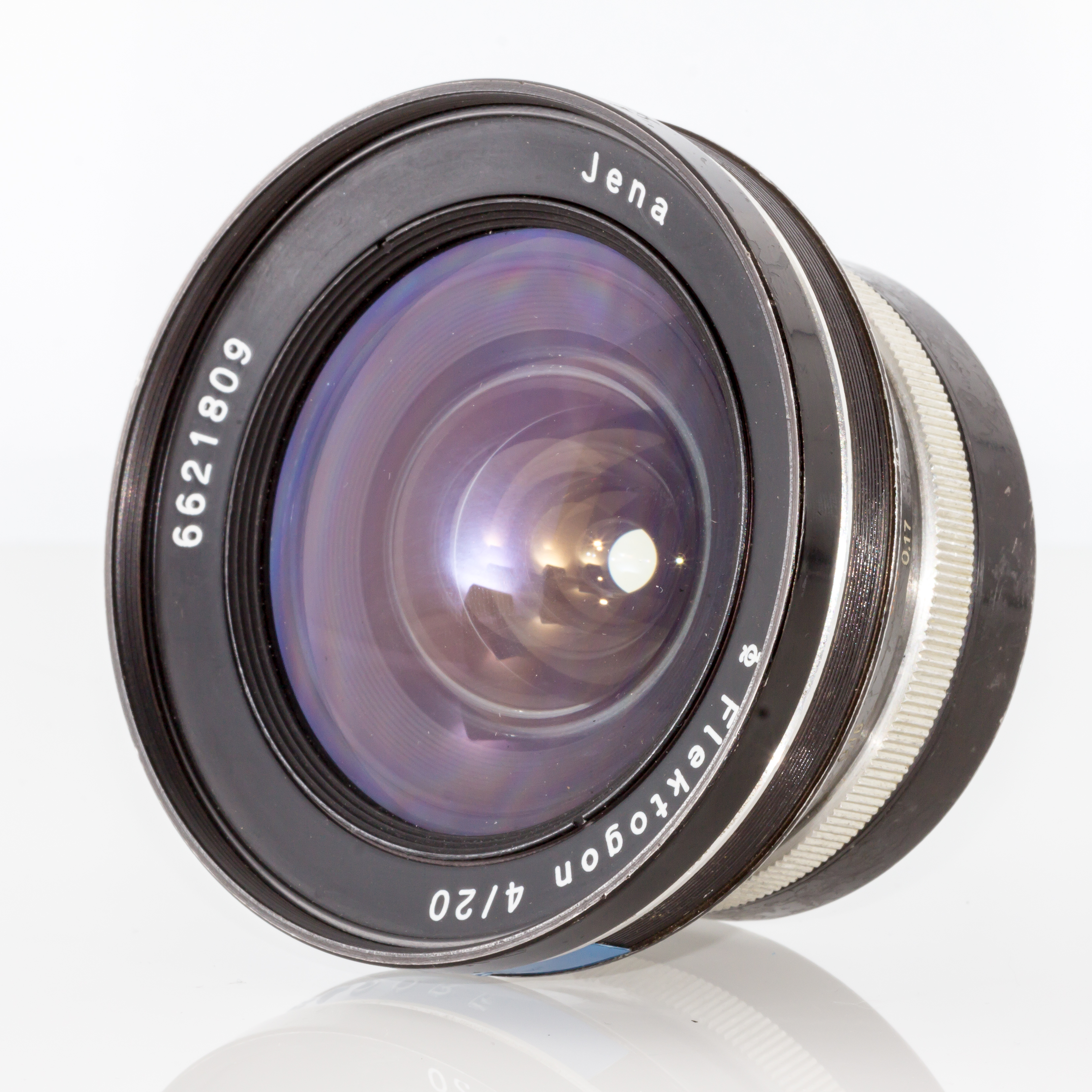
Zeiss (Jena) Flektogon 4/20

Angénieux were not content to rest on their laurels, continuing to develop the inverted telephoto scheme by shortening the focal length from 35 mm f/2.5 with the original Retrofocus R-1 (1950) to 28 mm f/3.5 with the Retrofocus R-11 (1952) and R-61 (24 mm f/3.5, 1958). These used multiple negative meniscus elements in the front group, a trend that would continue with the Zeiss (Jena) Flektogon 20 mm f/4 design of 1963, with three negative meniscus elements and an angle of view expanded to 94° from 62° (with the original Retrofocus R-1).

=== Further development ===
The highly symmetric super-wide angle lenses developed in the late 1940s and early 1950s, including the Biogon, are sometimes described as a mirrored pair of inverted telephoto objectives, as first presented by Roosinov in 1946.

Pincushion distortion is common with inverted telephoto designs because they are so highly asymmetric. Lee suggested using an air space in the negative group to control this distortion. By removing the constraint for rectilinear projection and deliberately introducing barrel distortion, the illumination of the field can be made more even; the resulting fisheye lenses can be considered a subset of the inverted telephoto lens design, with strong negative front elements.
