= Dhuusar =

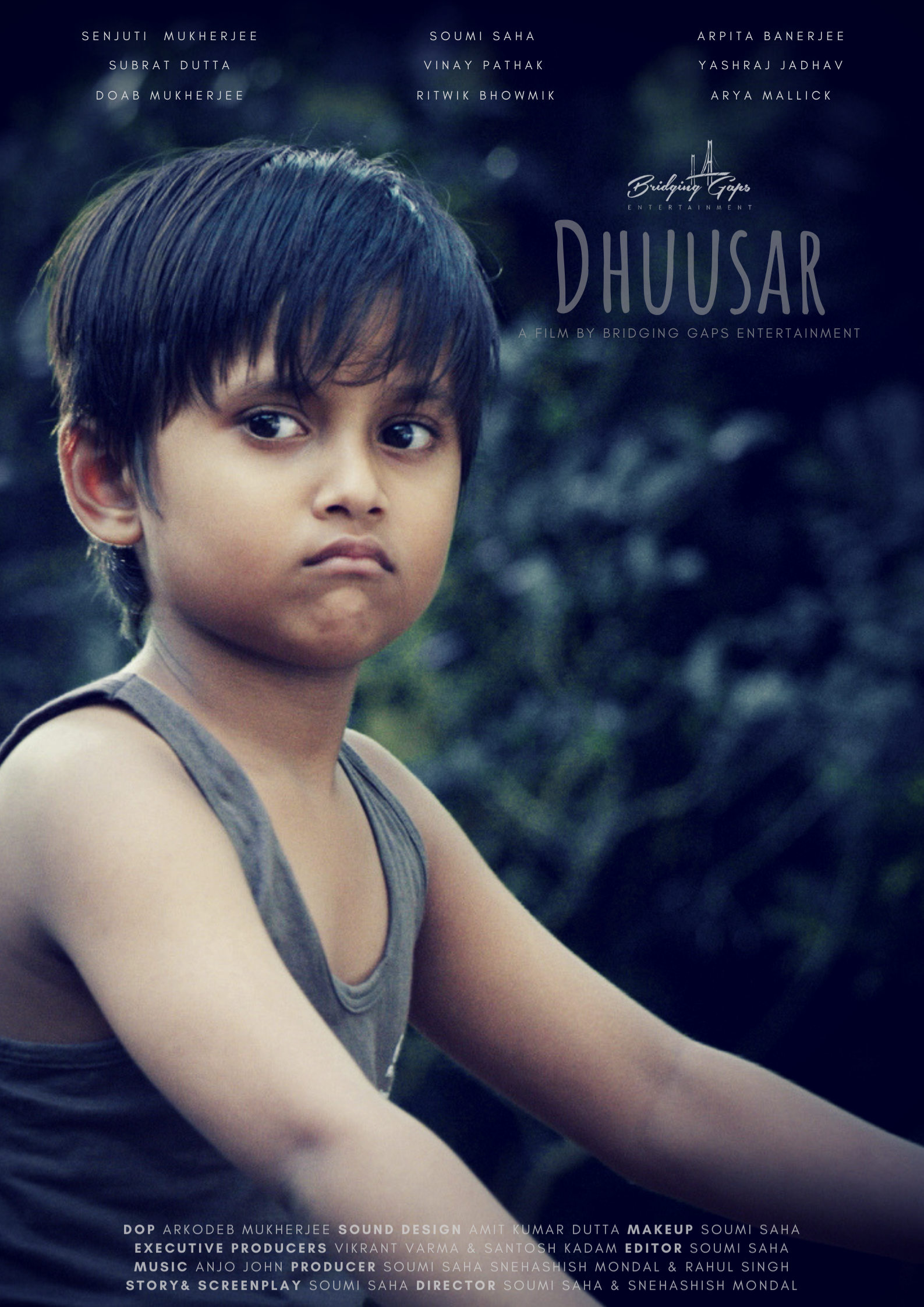
- Official Poster
- Directed by: Snehashish Mondal, Soumi Saha
- Written by: Soumi Saha
- Produced by: Snehashish Mondal, Soumi Saha, Rahul Singh
- Cinematography: Arkodeb Mukherjee
- Edited by: Soumi Saha
- Music by: Anjo John
- Release date: 2019
- Running time: 72 minutes
- Country: India
- Languages: Hindi, Bengali

Dhuusar (lit. 'Grey') is a 2019 Indian drama film directed by Soumi Saha and Snehashish Mondal, which features Ritwik Bhowmik in the lead role.

== Synopsis ==
Dhuusar is inspired by a real-life incident of Sajal Barui, who was a convicted criminal of Kolkata, India, for the murder of his family at the age of 16. The film is also a semi-autobiographical account of Saha's childhood and adolescence, depicting her relationship with a former lover and her mother.

== Cast ==
- Arya Mallick – Kid Shila
- Doab Mukherjee – Teen Shila
- Vinay Pathak – Supt. Avinash Gautam
- Subrat Dutta – Prashanta Guha
- Ritwik Bhowmik – Shiladitya Guha
- Senjuti Mukherjee – Paromita Guha
- Arpita Banerjee – Shuto
- Soumi Saha – Purva Sharma
- Yashraj Jadhav - Kaka

== Production ==
Soumi Saha is the writer, co-director, co-producer, production designer, costume designer, actor and editor of the film.

== Release and awards ==
Dhuusar premiered at the 20th Lucania Film Festival, Italy, where it won the Best Screenplay and Best Actor award for Saha.

It had its Indian premiere in Mumbai, at the 10th Jagran Film Festival before travelling to several international film festivals including Winchester Film Festival, United Kingdom; Barcelona International Film Festival, Spain; South Europe International Film Festival, Spain; and the Queen Palm International Film Festival, United States, where it won the Gold award for Best Feature & Best Editor (Saha), Silver award for Best Actor (Ritwik Bhowmik), Bronze award for Best Producer, and an Honorable Mention for Best Costume Design.
