= Maja Ma =

2022 Indian film directed by Anand Tiwari

- Directed by: Anand Tiwari
- Written by: Sumit Batheja
- Produced by: Amritpal Singh Bindra
- Starring: Madhuri Dixit; Gajraj Rao; Ritwik Bhowmik; Barkha Singh; Srishti Shrivastava; Simone Singh
- Cinematography: Debojeet Ray
- Edited by: Sanyukta Kaza
- Music by: Score: Shishir Samant; Songs: Siddharth Mahadevan; Souumil Shringarpure; Gourov Dasgupta; Anurag Sharma
- Production company: Leo Media Collective
- Distributed by: Amazon Prime Video
- Release date: 6 October 2022
- Running time: 134 minutes
- Country: India
- Language: Hindi

Maja Ma is a 2022 Indian Hindi-language drama film directed by Anand Tiwari. It stars Madhuri Dixit, Gajraj Rao, Ritwik Bhowmik, Barkha Singh, Srishti Shrivastava and Simone Singh. The film premiered on 6 October 2022 on Amazon Prime Video.

== Plot ==
Pallavi Patel is a simple housewife living in a housing society and is famous for her cooking and dancing. Her husband, Manohar Patel, is the chairman of the society. Pallavi's daughter is working towards her PhD in sexuality and gender identity. She is also an ally and an activist for LGBTQIA+ rights. Her son, who lives in America, is in love with Esha Hansraj. Pallavi's family is her world. But when Pallavi is questioned about her sexuality, her world and her family start to fall apart.

== Cast ==
- Madhuri Dixit as Pallavi Patel
  - Simran Nerurkar as young Pallavi
- Gajraj Rao as Manohar Patel
- Ritwik Bhowmik as Tejas Patel, Pallavi and Manohar Patel's son
- Barkha Singh as Esha Hansraj, Tejas Patel's fiancée and Bob Hansraj's daughter
- Srishti Shrivastava as Tara Patel Adhia, Pallavi and Manohar Patel's daughter
- Simone Singh as Kanchan Adhia, Tara's mother-in-law and Pallavi's ex-girlfriend
  - Khushi Khanna as young Kanchan
- Rajit Kapoor as Bob Hansraj, Esha Hansraj's father
- Sheeba Chaddha as Pam Hansraj, Bob Hansraj's wife
- Malhar Thakar as Pinakin Adhia, Tara's husband
- Rohit Kumar as Viral’s Friend Chabbu
- Khushi Hajare as Kinjal
- Ninad Kamat as Moolchand Adhia, Tara's father-in-law
- Krunal Pandit as Dr Ankit Patel
- Aarti Ashar as Society Women 2

== Soundtrack ==
Maja Ma

Soundtrack album by Siddharth Mahadevan, Souumil Shringarpure, Gourov Dasgupta, Anurag Sharma
- Released: 3 October 2022
- Genre: Feature film soundtrack
- Length: 24:38
- Language: Hindi
- Label: Sony Music India

Official audio
- Maja Ma - Full Album on YouTube

The music for the film is composed by Siddharth Mahadevan, Souumil Shringarpure, Gourov Dasgupta and Anurag Sharma while the lyrics are written by Priya Saraiya, Kumaar, Anurag Sharma and Lil Sidley.

Track listing
No.	Title	Lyrics	Music	Singer(s)	Length
1.	"Boom Padi"	Priya Saraiya	Siddharth Mahadevan, Souumil Shringarpure	Shreya Ghoshal, Osman Mir	4:06
2.	"Ae pagli"	Kumaar	Gourov Dasgupta	Ash King, Prakriti Kakkar	2:49
3.	"Kacchi Doriyaan"	Anurag Sharma	Anurag Sharma	Arijit Singh, Asees Kaur	3:56
4.	"Kacchi Doriyaan reprise"	Anurag Sharma	Anurag Sharma	Aniruddh Ananta, Harjot Kaur	3:54
5.	"Boom Padi- electronic version"	Priya Saraiya, Lil Sidley	Siddharth Mahadevan, Souumil Shringarpure	Yashita Sharma, Lil Sidley	2:39
6.	"Songs of Celebration"	Priya Saraiya	Siddharth Mahadevan, Souumil Shringarpure	Shashaa Tirupati, Osman Mir	3:05
7.	"Buniyaad 2.0"		The Yellow Diary	The Yellow Diary	4:11
Total length:					24:38

== Reception ==
Upon release, Maja Ma received mixed reviews from the film critics, who praised Dixit's performance but criticized the sanitised plot of the film.

Rachana Dubey from The Times of India gave a rating of 3.5/5 and described the film as "A conscious effort to navigate the internal conflicts that the various characters feel, with Pallavi's sudden relevation." Manik Sharma from Firstpost wrote, "Pallavi’s sexuality is a matter of public debate long before, she takes the brave step to contemplate what is being said. This knotty moral conundrum that Pallavi must confront as a personal journey, is the highlight of a film that can often oscillate between massy tropes and meaningful depths." Shweta Keshri from India Today gave Maja Ma a rating of 2/5 and wrote, "Madhuri Dixit carries the film on her shoulders and Gajraj Rao delivers a flawless performance. The film dealt with the topic sensitively and not made a mockery of it. However, the film's ending is disappointing".
