= Evelin van Rei =

Dutch cinematographer

Evelin van Rei is a Dutch cinematographer and photographer based in London, formerly credited as Ann Evelin Lawford.

== Career ==
Van Rei graduated with first-class honors from the Cambridge School of Art in 2012. Initially working as a camera trainee and clapper loader, she transitioned to lighting for short films, music videos and commercials by late 2014. In 2018, she was nominated for the BSE Emerging Cinematographer Award for her work on Innozenz and Cinematography Carbon Award at Frēsh 18 for I'll Probably Never See You Again. In 2022, van Rei received the Angénieux Special Encouragement award, becoming the first cinematographer without formal film school training to be honoured with it.

Mark Pellington was impressed by van Rei's cinematography, which she shared on her Instagram, and subsequently invited her to collaborate on The Severing in the United States.

== Filmography ==
As cinematographer
Year	Film	Notes
2022	Vera	S11 E3 "Tyger Tyger"
2022	The Severing	
2022	Bad Sisters	Apple TV+ series, 3 episodes
2024	Passenger	ITV TV series; 3 episodes
TBA	Walk With Me †	

== Awards and nominations ==
Year	Award	Result	Ref
2018	BSC Short Film Cinematography Award	Nominated	
2019	BSC Short Film Cinematography Award	Nominated	
2022	Angenieux Special Encouragement	Won	
