= Mukhosh (2020 film) =

2020 Indian Bengali film

- Release poster
- Directed by: Arghadeep Chatterjee
- Screenplay by: Aveek Ray; Sujoyneel Bandopadhyay
- Produced by: Suman Sengupta
- Starring: Payel Sarkar; Rajatava Dutta; Shantilal Mukherjee; Amrita Halder; Prantik Banerjee; Suchismita Thakur
- Cinematography: Modhura Palit
- Edited by: Anirban Maity
- Music by: Nilanjan Ghosh
- Production company: SSG Entertainment
- Distributed by: PSS Entertainments
- Release date: 3 January 2020
- Country: India
- Language: Bengali

Mukhosh (transl. The mask) is a Bengali thriller drama film directed by Argha Deep Chatterjee and produced by Suman Sengupta. The film starring Payel Sarkar and Rajatava Dutta was released on 3 January 2020 under the banner of SSG Entertainment.

== Plot ==
Ranajay is an industrialist and influential person. He joins politics then one day, his wife goes missing and his sister-in-law Amrita suspects he is responsible for her mysterious disappearance. She complains to the police. Police inspector Sabyasachi Banerjee investigates the case.

== Cast ==
- Rajatava Dutta as Ranajay
- Payel Sarkar as Amrita
- Shantilal Mukherjee as Sabyasachi Banerjee
- Prantik Banerjee
- Amrita Halder
