= Bagha Jatin (2023 film) =

- Theatrical release poster
- Directed by: Arun Roy
- Written by: Sounava Bose; Arun Roy
- Produced by: Dev; Gurupada Adhikari
- Starring: Dev; Sreeja Dutta; Sudipta Chakraborty
- Narrated by: Mir
- Cinematography: Gopi Bhagat
- Edited by: Md. Kalam
- Music by: Nilayan Chatterjee
- Production company: Dev Entertainment Ventures
- Distributed by: PVR Inox Pictures (India); Reliance Entertainment (Overseas)
- Release dates: 19 October 2023 (Bengali); 20 October 2023 (Hindi)
- Running time: 137:59 minutes
- Country: India
- Language: Bengali
- Budget: ₹5 crore
- Box office: ₹12.3 crore+

Bagha Jatin is a 2023 Indian Bengali language bio-historical action drama film co-written and directed by Arun Roy. The film is produced by Dev and Gurupada Adhikari under Dev Entertainment Ventures. The film stars Dev as the title character with Sreeja Dutta, Sudipta Chakraborty, Shoaib Kabeer, Rohaan Bhattacharjee, Carl A. Harte and Alexandra Taylor in pivotal roles. The film is based on the life of Bagha Jatin, a freedom fighter who fought for Indian independence along with fellow members of the Jugantar. The film features a total of 92 freedom fighters.

It was released in theaters during Durga Puja on 19 October 2023 in Bengali language and on 20 October in Hindi dubbed version. It marks the last directional venture of Arun Roy before his death on 2 January 2025.

== Cast ==
- Dev as Jatindranath Mukherjee, known as Bagha Jatin, Indian independence activist
- Sreeja Dutta as Indubala Banerjee, Bagha Jatin's wife
- Sudipta Chakraborty as Binodbala, Bagha Jatin's elder sister
- Samiul Alam as Kshudiram Bose, Indian revolutionary
- Sajal Mondal as Arabindo Ghose, journalist, editor of newspapers such as Bande Mataram
- Kallol De as Ullaskar Dutta, a figure in the Indian subcontinent's anti-British independence movement
- Sumanta Roy as Hemchandra Kanungo, Indian nationalist and a member of the Anushilan Samiti
- Rohaan Bhattacharjee as Chittapriya Ray Chaudhuri, Bengali revolutionary and member of the Indian independence movement
- Carl A. Harte as Charles Tegart, Irish police officer who served extensively in British India and Palestine
- Alexandra Taylor as Mrs. Kennedy
- Shoaib Kabeer as Manoranjan Sengupta
- Bhaskar Mukherjee as M. N. Roy
- Kolaj Sengupta as Rash Behari Bose
- Raju Bera as Prafulla Chaki
- Biswajit Naskar as Satyendranath Bose
- Ujjwal Ghosh as Charu Chandra Bose
- Anirban Paitandi as Nirendranath Dasgupta
- Abhirup Chowdhury as Birendranath Dutta Gupta
- Shrimanta Chakraborty as Shrish Chandra Mitra
- Arohi Bakhuli as Ashalata Mukherjee, Bagha Jatin's daughter
- Gurshaan Singh Kohli as Kartar Singh Sarabha, Indian revolutionary
- Sandip Ghosh as Barindra Kumar Ghosh, Indian revolutionary and journalist
- Sourav Mukherjee as Vishnu Ganesh Pingle
- Arijit Bhusan Bagchi as Ashu Biswas, Alipur Government's lawyer
- Konkona Haldar
- Mir Afsar Ali as Narrator
- Adrjia Roy as Biplobi Bimboboti

== Production ==
=== Development ===
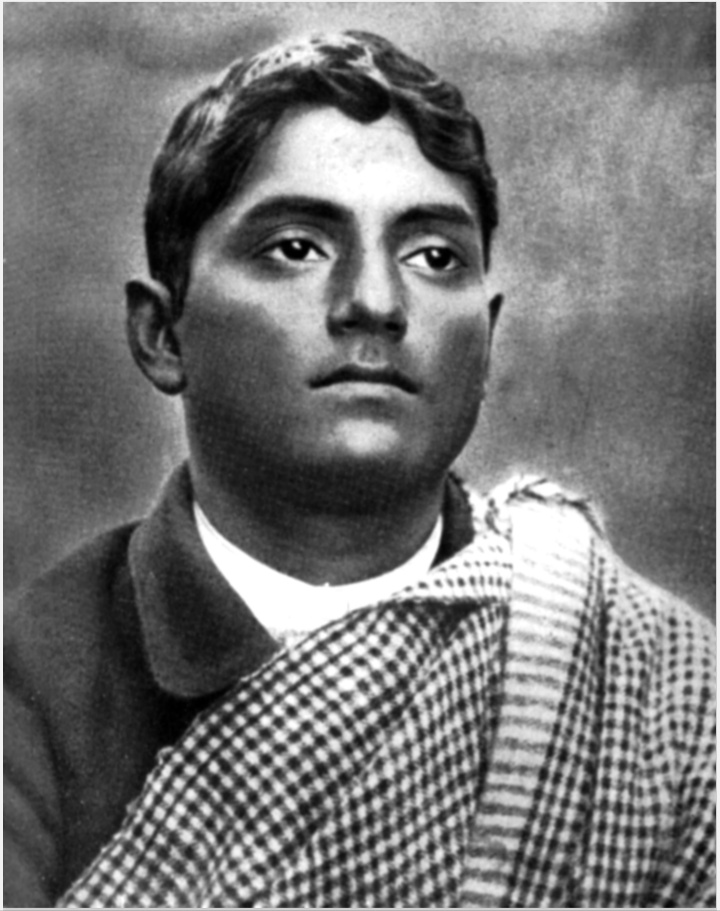
Bagha Jatin, the real-life Indian revolutionary whose life was portrayed in the film

In July 2022, director Arun Roy told Anandabazar Online about writing the script for the Bagha Jatin. He said that "I have been writing about Bagha Jatin for the last one and a half years. I don't know anything more than that." At this time, it is also known that the shooting of the film will begin from October. On 15 August 2022, The film was officially announced on the occasion of India's 75th Independence Day.

Bagha Jatin is a biographical film, that covers the life of real-life Indian revolutionary Bagha Jatin and his fight against the British Raj. Dev played the role of Bagha Jatin, the central character of the film. The film explores the events of the last two decades of the 19th century and the first two decades of the 20th century.

=== Casting ===
It was announced in July 2022 that Dev would play the lead role of Bagha Jatin in the film. Auditions were held to select the actress for the role of Indubala Banerjee in the film Bagha Jatin, produced by Dev Entertainment and directed by Arun Roy. Auditions were conducted by the director and production company by visiting various colleges in West Bengal. About 6 thousand girls auditioned, out of which Sreeja Dutta was selected. Samiul Alam was selected for the role of revolutionary Kshudiram Bose. Australian actor Carl A. Hart was selected to play the role of Charles Tegart, Deputy Commissioner of the Calcutta Police.

=== Filming ===
Principal photography took place in the Baripada forest, Odisha and Kolkata. The Baripada forest in Odisha were selected for the scenes of the Battle of Buribalam. Recce was done in November 2022 for site selection. In February 2023, the shooting started in the Birpara forest. But, during the shooting for an action scene, Dev suffered an eye injury, due to which the shooting was stopped for few days. Dev was admitted to a hospital in Mumbai for treatment. Birpara jungle scene work resumed in May. The imprisonment of many revolutionaries in Kolkata's Alipore Jail was filmed. A British period prison environment was recreated for the scene at Alipore Jail.

== Soundtrack ==
The music of the film was composed by Nilayan Chatterjee. The lyrics were written by Nilayan Chatterjee.

The first single was released on 23 September 2023. The second single was released on 30 September 2023. The third single was released on 7 October 2023. The fourth single was released on 15 October in Bengali and was released on 16 October in Hindi.

=== Original ===
Bagha Jatin

Soundtrack album by Nilayan Chatterjee
- Released: 18 October 2023
- Recorded: 2023
- Genre: Feature film soundtrack
- Length: 22:34
- Language: Bengali
- Label: Zee Music Bangla

Official audio
- Bagha Jatin - Full Album on YouTube

Singles from Bagha Jatin
- 1. "Ei Desh Amar" Released: 23 September 2023; 2. "Bagha Bagha Hey" Released: 30 September 2023; 3. "Jago Re Bagha" Released: 7 October 2023; 4. "Ashbo Phire" Released: 15 October 2023

Nilayan Chatterjee chronology
Dilkhush (2023)	Bagha Jatin (2023)	TBA (TBA)

No.	Title	Singer(s)	Length
1.	"Ei Desh Amar"	Rupam Islam	3:01
2.	"Bagha Bagha Hey"	Bavrabi Basu, Sreeja Gupta	3:41
3.	"Jago Re Bagha"	Snigdhajit Bhowmick, Iman Chakraborty	2:44
4.	"Ashbo Phire"	Arijit Singh	4:43
5.	"Ekotar Gaan"	Nilayan Chatterjee	3:07
6.	"Prince of Mine"	Pratisha Paul	2:45
7.	"Amra Morbo Jogot Jagbe"	Nilayan Chatterjee	1:09
8.	"Vande Mataram"	Nilayan Chatterjee, Subhadeep Pan, Sayan Ghosh	2:29
Total length:			22:34

=== Hindi ===
Bagha Jatin

Soundtrack album by Nilayan Chatterjee
- Released: 18 October 2023
- Recorded: 2023
- Genre: Feature film soundtrack
- Length: 22:34
- Language: Hindi
- Label: Zee Music Company

Official audio
- Bagha Jatin - Full Album on YouTube

No.	Title	Singer(s)	Length
1.	"Ek Ho Pukar"	Rupam Islam	3:01
2.	"Bagha Bagha Hey"	Bavrabi Basu, Sreeja Gupta	3:41
3.	"Jago Re Bagha"	Snigdhajit Bhowmick, Iman Chakraborty	2:44
4.	"Hai Yeh Wada"	Sonu Nigam	4:44
5.	"Aakhri Khat"	Nilayan Chatterjee	3:07
6.	"Prince of Mine"	Pratisha Paul	2:45
7.	"Amra Morbo Jogot Jagbe"	Nilayan Chatterjee	1:09
8.	"Vande Mataram"	Nilayan Chatterjee, Subhadeep Pan, Sayan Ghosh	2:29
Total length:			22:34

== Marketing ==
The Bengali pre-teaser of the film was released on 14 August 2023 on Dev Entertainment Ventures Youtube channel. The Hindi pre-teaser was released on 15 August 2023, on the occasion of Independence Day.

The teaser for the film was released on 9 September 2023 in both Bengali and Hindi on Dev Entertainment Ventures Youtube channel. The Bengali trailer was released on 9 October 2023. The Hindi trailer was dropped one day later, on 10 October 2023 on Zee Music Company Youtube channel.

== Release ==
=== Theatrical ===
In June 2023, the film was slated for theatrical release in Bengali and Hindi on 20 October 2023 on the occasion of Durga Puja. But as per the final decision, it was released across India in Bengali language on 19 October. The dubbed version of Hindi language was released across India on 20 October. It released on almost 200 screens in Indian markets, including 19 and 20 October releases.

=== Home media ===
The movie was telecasted on 23 June 2024 on Star Jalsha. On digital media, it is streaming on Disney+ Hotstar.

== Reception ==
Elina Dutta of Ei Samay rated the film 3.5 out of 5 stars and wrote "A tickle of Bengali nationalism with patriotism, Bagha Jatin is a cocktail of the glorious history of Bengal. The background score by Neelayan Chatterjee is also worth noting. Riding on the raft of patriotism and Dev's stardom, it looks set to win the box office." Virat Verma of Flickonclick reviewed the film and wrote "Dev’s portrayal of Jatindranath Mukherjee is compelling and serves as the backbone of the film. Bagha Jatin is a commendable addition to Bengali cinema, providing a powerful and historically significant narrative. It is a must-watch for those interested in India’s history and its fight for freedom, offering a glimpse into the lives of the heroes who shaped the nation’s destiny."

Upam Buzarbaruah of The Times of India rated the film 3.5 out of 5 stars and wrote "Bagha Jatin is a good watch but could have been much more. For one, the editing leaves ample room to tighten the narrative, and second, a decent pick up in the overall pace could have done wonders to the film. However, the VFX sequence that shows how Jatindranath came to be known as ‘Bagha’ by slaying a tiger, make-up and the film music is impressive. If you want to experience the life and journey of a renowned Bengali freedom fighter, better not miss it." Subhasmita Kanji of Hindustan Times wrote "Bagha Jatin's dialogue deserves special praise. However, the first part shows so many fragmented events that could have been put together in a better way. But in the hustle and bustle of Puja, this film will inspire more tension towards the country, inform the history as well as give courage."

Akash Misra of Sangbad Pratidin wrote "Dev has imbued into the character of Bagha Jatin with emotions. This film will be memorable in his filmography, that much can be said." Souvik Saha of Cine Kolkata rated the film 4.5 out of 5 stars and wrote "Baghajatin is a commendable attempt at bringing a crucial chapter of history to the silver screen. Dev’s powerful performance, coupled with strong supporting acts and impressive visuals, makes this film a worthy watch. While it falls short in some aspects, it stands as a testament to the filmmakers’ courage and dedication." Anandabazar Patrika and The Indian Express also reviewed the film.

=== Box office ===
The film trade magazine Film Information mentioned that the film collected over ₹11.45 lakhs (₹1.14 million) from national multiplex chains only in West Bengal on first day.

According to Hindustantimes Bangla, the film grossed ₹3.25 crore (US$340,000) within eight days of its release in the domestic market.
