= Rahoul Mukherjiee =

Indian film director

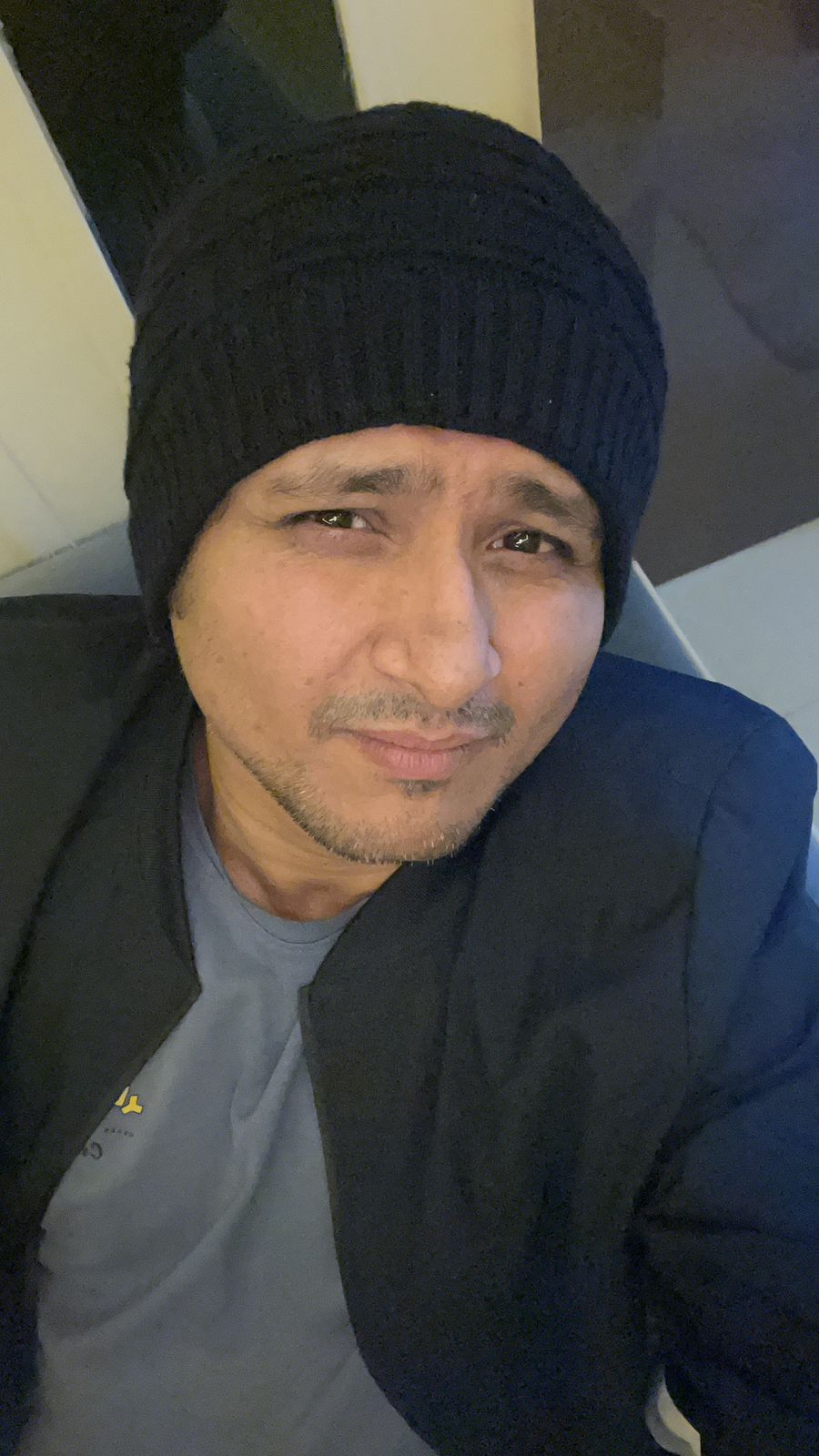
- Occupations: Director; screenwriter
- Years active: 2010–present
- Known for: Kishmish (2022); Dilkhush (2023)

Rahoul Mukherjiee is an Indian film director and screenwriter who predominantly works in Bengali Cinema. He made his film debut with the Dev starrer Kishmish in the year 2022.

== Career ==
After several years of working in television, Mukherjiee was about to make his film debut with the film Ami Sairabanu with Rajkumar Rao as the hero in the year 2013. The film got marred in the some financial controversy and was eventually shelved.

Mukherjiee made his directorial debut with the film Kishmish in 2022. Starring Dev-Rukmini in the lead roles, film was initially announced in 2020 but the production got delayed due to the Covid-19 pandemic. The film finally went on floors in August 2021 and released on 29th April, 2022. The film received positive reviews from the critics.

He then directed the romantic drama Dilkhush under the banner of Shree Venkatesh Films. Starring Madhumita Sarcar, Sohum Majumdar, Paran Bandopadhyay, Anashua Majumdar in the lead roles, the film received positive reviews from the critics.

His next film is Mon Maaney Na, starring Ritwik Bhowmik and Hiya Chatterjee. This film marks the debut of Ritwik Bhowmik in Bengali Cinema along with Hiya Chatterjee as well. He is acting as a Producer as well apart from directing the film. The film released on 13 February 2026.

== Filmography ==
=== Television ===
Denotes films or web series that have not yet been released

Year	Show	Director	Channel	Notes
2011	Ishti Kutum	Yes	Star Jalsha	Directorial Debut
2016	Resham Jhapi	Yes	Colors Bangla	
2017	Shubho Drishti	Yes	Colors Bangla	
2020	Pandob Goyenda	Yes	Zee Bangla	

=== Web Series ===
Year	Show	Director	OTT	Notes
2024	Dadur Kirti	Yes	For Hoichoi	
2024	Chhabi Biswas	Yes	For Hoichoi	Also Producer
2024	Lohu	Yes	For Chorki	In Post-Production
2026	Khanikta Premer Moton	Yes	For Platform 8	Also Producer

=== Films ===
Year	Film	Director	Writer	Notes
2021	Ikir Mikir	No	Yes	
2022	Kishmish	Yes	Yes	Film Directorial Debut
2023	Dilkhush	Yes	Yes	
2026	Mon Maaney Na	Yes	Yes	Also Producer
