= Dilkhush =

2023 Indian Bengali film

- Directed by: Rahool Mukherjee
- Written by: Rahool Mukherjee
- Produced by: Shrikant Mohta
- Cinematography: Modhura Palit
- Edited by: Sharmistha Chakrabartty
- Music by: Nilayan Chatterjee
- Production company: Shree Venkatesh Films
- Distributed by: Shree Venkatesh Films
- Release date: 20 January 2023
- Country: India
- Language: Bengali

Dilkhush is a 2023 Indian Bengali language Romantic drama film written and directed by Rahool Mukherjee. It is produced by Shrikant Mohta under the banner of Shree Venkatesh Films. The film features an ensemble cast including Paran Bandopadhyay, Anashua Majumdar, Madhumita Sarcar, Soham Majumdar, Kharaj Mukherjee, Aparajita Adhya, Ujan Chatterjee, and Aishwarya Sen.

== Cast ==
- Paran Bandopadhyay as Ratan
- Anashua Majumdar as Komolika
- Madhumita Sarcar as Pushpita
- Soham Majumdar as Rishi
- Kharaj Mukherjee as Shakti
- Aparajita Auddy as Dolly
- Ujan Chatterjee as Bodhi
- Aishwarya Sen as Trisha
- Ananya Sen as Putul

== Soundtrack ==
The music of the film is composed by Nilayan Chatterjee. All lyrics are also written by Nilayan Chatterjee. The Popular Song Bibagi Phone Lyrics is written by Nilayan Chatterjee.

Track listing
No.	Title	Singer(s)	Length
1.	"Bibagi Phone"	Anirban Bhattacharya	3:45
2.	"Sajani"	Nilayan Chatterjee	3:27
3.	"Tobu Onyo Kothao"	Shaan, Antara Mitra	4:08
4.	"Apatoto Jai"	Nilayan Chatterjee	4:05
5.	"Yeh Dilkhush"	Ananya Chakraborty, Ishan Mitra	3:12
Total length:			18:37

== Release and reception ==
The film was released in the theatres on 20 January 2023.

Poorna Banerjee of the Times of India rated the film 3 out of 5 stars and wrote "There are many surprises in this mixed bag of love, but perhaps the film rushes through the drama too much to highlight certain important moments. Music is decent if not memorable, still Dilkhush would be a nice weekend watch with friends and family." Bhaswati Ghosh of Ei Samay rated the film 3 out of 5 stars and wrote "It was expected that the talented actors of this film will attract attention. Rich and uplifting alchemy soothes the mind like fresh flowers. All in all, it was an experience, sometimes pleasant, sometimes exhilarating."
