= Horace Lee =

English cricketer

Personal information
- Full name: Horace Cedric Lee
- Born: 14 March 1909; North Shields, Northumberland, England
- Died: 14 July 1981 (aged 72); Wallsend, Northumberland, England
- Batting: Right-handed
- Bowling: Right-arm fast-medium

Domestic team information
- Years: Team
- 1936–1937: Minor Counties
- 1928–1947: Northumberland

Career statistics
Competition	First-class
Matches	2
Runs scored	112
Batting average	28.00
100s/50s	–/1
Top score	61
Balls bowled	–
Wickets	–
Bowling average	–
5 wickets in innings	–
10 wickets in match	–
Best bowling	–
Catches/stumpings	1/–
- Source: Cricinfo, 4 May 2012

Horace Cedric Lee (14 March 1909 – 14 July 1981) was an English cricketer. Lee was a right-handed batsman who bowled right-arm fast-medium. He was born at North Shields, Northumberland.

Lee made his debut in county cricket for Northumberland in the 1929 Minor Counties Championship against Durham. Before the start of World War II in 1939, Lee made 67 appearances for the county in the Minor Counties Championship. In 1935, Lee made his first-class debut for a combined Minor Counties team against the Oxford University at the University Parks. Batting first, the Minor Counties made 251 all out. In their second-innings, the Minor Counties made 294 all out, with Lee making 45 runs before he was once again dismissed by Whitehouse. Oxford University reached 23 without loss in their second-innings, with the match declared a draw. The following season he made a second first-class appearance for the Minor Counties against Ireland at Observatory Road, Dublin. Batting first, Ireland were dismissed for 102, which the Minor Counties responded to by making just 69 in their first-innings, which saw Lee dismissed for 5 runs by James Graham. Ireland then made 179 in their second-innings, setting the Minor Counties a target of 213 for victory. Chasing that target, the Minor Counties were dismissed for just 133, with Lee being dismissed for a single run by the same bowler. Following World War II, he played a further Minor Counties Championship match for Northumberland against Staffordshire.

He died at Wallsend, Northumberland, on 14 July 1981.
