= Mon Maaney Na =

2026 Indian Bengali romantic drama film

- Theatrical release poster
- Bengali: মন মানে না
- Literally: Heart doesn't accept
- Directed by: Rahoul Mukherjiee
- Screenplay by: Aritra Sengupta
- Story by: Rahoul Mukherjiee; Aritra Sengupta
- Starring: Ritwik Bhowmik; Hiya Chatterjee; Soumya Mukherjee; Sweta Mishra; Kharaj Mukherjee
- Cinematography: Modhura Palit
- Edited by: Amit Ray
- Music by: Nilayan Chatterjee
- Production companies: Studio Blotting Paper; GP Entertainment
- Distributed by: PVR Inox Pictures
- Release date: 13 February 2026
- Running time: 170 minutes
- Country: India
- Language: Bengali

Mon Maaney Na (Bengali pronunciation: [mɔn mane na]; Bengali: মন মানে না, lit. 'Heart doesn't accept') is a 2026 Indian Bengali-language musical romantic drama film written and directed by Rahoul Mukherjiee. It stars Ritwik Bhowmik, Hiya Chatterjee and Soumya Mukherjee in the lead roles, alongside Sweta Mishra, Kharaj Mukherjee and Sudipa Basu in supporting roles. This film marks the Bengali film debut of Ritwik Bhowmik and film debut of Hiya Chatterjee. The music and the lyrics have been penned by Nilayan Chatterjee, marking the third collaboration between the director and the music director.

The film was announced in July, 2025 and it released on 13 February 2026, on the eve of Valentine's Day.

== Synopsis ==
Rahul and Bidisha are friends from their college years who share a close emotional bond. While Rahul pursues several unsuccessful romantic relationships, he remains unaware of his deeper feelings for Bidisha. Over time, their circumstances change and they eventually lose contact with one another.

Years later, the two reunite during a significant event in Bidisha's life. This reunion causes their previous unresolved emotions to resurface. Amidst their current life commitments, Rahul and Bidisha are forced to evaluate the nature of their relationship and determine the future of their bond.

== Cast ==
- Ritwik Bhowmik as Rahul Sen
- Hiya Chatterjee as Bidisha Mukherjee
- Soumya Mukherjee as Ranojoy Basu
- Sweta Mishra as Meghla Das
- Kharaj Mukherjee as Bidisha's father
- Sudipa Basu as Rahul's grandmother
- Sumit Ganguly as Gurudev, an astrologer
- Anil Kuriakose as Meghla's father
- Moupiya Goswami
- Srishti Halder
- Sabuj Bardhan
- Preeti Sarkar
- Jayati Chakraborty
- Rukmini Maitra as Binodini, History Teacher (cameo)
- Ritabhari Chakraborty as Bidisha's mother (cameo)
- Saswata Chatterjee as college principal (cameo)

== Production ==
=== Development and Casting ===
Hiya Chatterjee, daughter of noted Bengali actor Saswata Chatterjee was roped in to play the female lead, thus marking her debut. Ritwik Bhowmik of Bandish Bandits fame was roped in to play the male lead, thus marking his debut in Bengali Cinema. Frequent collaborators of Rahoul Mukherjiee, Nilayan Chatterjee and Modhura Palit were roped in as music director and cinematographer respectively.

=== Filming ===
The Mahurat was held at Kalighat temple on 12 May 2025 in the presence of Rahoul Mukherjiee, Ritwik Bhowmik and the entire cast and crew of the film. The film went on floors in the month of July and wrapped on 7 August 2025.

== Soundtrack ==
Mon Maaney Na

Soundtrack album by Nilayan Chatterjee
- Released: 2026
- Genre: Film soundtrack
- Length: 15:26
- Language: Bengali
- Label: Saregama Bengali

The soundtrack of the film has been composed by Nilayan Chatterjee and the lyrics have been penned by Nilayan Chatterjee as well.

The first single "Mon Maaney Na Title Track (Male)" was released on 15 January 2026. The second song "Konye Konye" was released on 23 January 2026. The third single "Ke Tumi Nandini 2.0" was dropped on 29 January 2026. It is a reimagination of the song Jibone Ki Pabo Na from the film Teen Bhubaner Pare, where Sudhin Dasgupta was the composer and lyricist and was voiced by Manna Dey. The fourth song "Jao Na - (Male Version)" was released on 30 January 2026.

No.	Title	Lyrics	Music	Singer(s)	Length
1.	"Mon Maaney Na Title Track (Male)"	Nilayan Chatterjee	Nilayan Chatterjee	Nilayan Chatterjee	4:42
2.	"Konye Konye"	Nilayan Chatterjee	Nilayan Chatterjee	Kinjal Chatterjee	4:03
3.	"Ke Tumi Nandini 2.0"	Nilayan Chatterjee, Sudhin Dasgupta	Nilayan Chatterjee, Sudhin Dasgupta	Subhadeep Pan, Nikhita Gandhi, Manna Dey	3:43
4.	"Jao Na (Male Version)"	Nilayan Chatterjee	Nilayan Chatterjee	Ishan Mitra	3:38
Total length:					15:26

== Marketing ==
The first look of the film was unveiled on 26 December 2025. The teaser was unveiled on 2 January 2026.

== Release ==
The film is set to release on 13 February 2026, on the eve of Valentine's Day.

== Reception ==
=== Critical reception ===
Eshna Bhattacharya of the Times of India rated the film 2.5/5 stars and wrote "Mon Maaney Na is visually polished, musically engaging and earnest in intent. Yet beneath the gloss lies a film unsure whether it wants to reinterpret romantic nostalgia or simply recreate it." She praised Soumya's performance, the vivid cinematography, the supporting cast and small cameos but bemoaned the over-dramatic performance of Ritwik in certain scenes, excessive melodrama of Hiya in the quiet emotional sequences, the below par writing, poor screenplay and the huge structural imbalance between the two halves.

Shampali Moulik of Sangbad Pratidin reviewed the film and opined "If more care was taken to fill up the loopholes in the screenplay, the film would have been complete." She applauded the vibrant cinematography, chemistry between the lead actors, each of their performances and the small cameos but criticised the slow second half and Ritwik's poor accent and weird hairstyle.
