= Kishmish =

2022 Indian Bengali-language film by Rahool Mukherjee

- Directed by: Rahoul Mukherjiee
- Written by: Rahoul Mukherjiee
- Produced by: Dev; Atul Agarwal
- Starring: Dev; Rukmini Maitra
- Cinematography: Modhura Palit
- Edited by: Amit Ray
- Music by: Nilayan Chatterjee
- Production companies: Dev Entertainment Ventures; M.K. Media
- Distributed by: SSR Cinemas
- Release date: 29 April 2022
- Running time: 141:32 minutes
- Country: India
- Language: Bengali
- Budget: ₹1.35 Cr
- Box office: ₹2.7 Cr

Kishmish (transl. Raisins) is a 2022 Indian Bengali-language romantic comedy film written and directed by Rahoul Mukherjiee. This film is jointly produced by Dev Entertainment Ventures and M. K. Media. The film stars Dev and Rukmini Maitra. The supporting cast includes Kharaj Mukherjee, Anjana Basu, June Malia and Kamaleshwar Mukherjee.

== Plot ==
After failing in the school examinations, Tintin goes to college where he meets Rohini, a topper girl in his batch. Gradually they fell in love. They both want to get married but somehow, they couldn't manage their parents. Then a series of events happen in their life which make the situation more complex.

== Cast ==
- Dev as Krishanu Chatterjee aka Tintin
- Rukmini Maitra as Rohini Sen
- Kharaj Mukherjee as Govinda "Goblu" Chatterjee, Tintin's father
- Anjana Basu as Pubali Chatterjee, Tintin's mother
- Kamaleshwar Mukherjee as Ashim Sen, Rohini's father
- June Malia as Rohini's mother
- Lily Chakravarty as Buri, Pubali's aunt
- Ankush Hazra (cameo appearance)
- Rituparna Sengupta (cameo appearance)
- Paran Bandopadhyay (cameo appearance)
- Srabanti Chatterjee (cameo appearance)
- Jisshu Sengupta (cameo appearance)

== Production ==
=== Development ===
The film was announced in November 2020, starring Dev and Rukmini Maitra.

=== Filming ===
The makers of the film with arranged an muhurat puja for the team a month ahead of filming. The principal photography of the film started in August 2021 in Kolkata, followed by Darjeeling, and was completed within 10 days. The film was wrapped up on 22 September 2021.

== Soundtrack ==
The film's music composed and lyrics written by Nilayan Chatterjee. On 30 March 2022, the first song titled "Tui Bolbo Na Tumi" sung by Nikhita Gandhi and Subhadeep Pan was unveiled. Ten days later, the second song "Oboseshe" sung by Arijit Singh was released.

Kishmish

Soundtrack album by Nilayan Chatterjee
- Released: 2022
- Recorded: 2021
- Genre: Film soundtrack
- Length: 16:49
- Label: Saregama Bengali
External videos
- "Tui Bolbo Na Tumi" on YouTube
- "Oboseshe" on YouTube
- "Kanna" on YouTube
- "Janina Bhalolaga" on YouTube

Singles from Kishmish
- 1. "Tui Bolbo Na Tumi" Released: 30 March 2022; 2. "Oboseshe" Released: 9 April 2022; 3. "Kanna" Released: 18 April 2022; 4. "Janina Bhalolaga" Released: 22 April 2022

Track listing
No.	Title	Singer(s)	Length
1.	"Tui Bolbo Na Tumi"	Nikhita Gandhi, Subhadeep Pan	3:52
2.	"Oboseshe"	Arijit Singh	4:26
3.	"Kanna"	Papon	4:22
4.	"Janina Bhalolaga"	Nikhita Gandhi, Shaswat Singh	4:09
Total length:			16:49

== Release ==
=== Theatrical ===
The film was released theatrically on 29 April 2022.

=== Home media ===
The film was digitally premiered on the OTT Platform Hoichoi on 29 November 2024.

== Reception ==
Upam Buzarbaruah of The Times of India gave it three and a half stars out of five and praised the movie saying that it is quite a pleasant watch. He noted that runtime of almost two and a half hours is a bit lengthy but the narrative, interspersed with some nice melodious songs, moves at a relatively fast pace and helps in passing the time easily. He opined that Kishmish is a refreshing treat for all ages and for the family.

Anandabazar Patrika reviewed that the film brings back the nostalgic memories of college days and that watching it would lead one to possess a desire to go back to college. The protagonist of the film, Dev, expressed that the best review was received from his father. He wrote "In my 39 years of life, my dad never wrote me a letter. Like every other movie, my dad and my family came today to see the movie Kishmish. Outside Dad wrote "Kishmish Super duper Hit"." Ei Samay reviewed it and gave it three and a half stars out of five.
