= Ritwik Bhowmik =

Indian actor

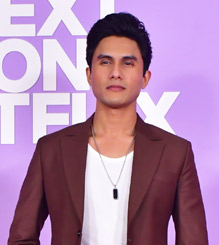
- Bhowmik in 2025
- Born: 28 August 1992 (age 34); Aurangabad, Maharashtra, India
- Education: B.Com
- Occupation: Actor
- Years active: 2017–present
- Known for: Bandish Bandits; The Whistleblower; Modern Love Mumbai

Ritwik Bhowmik (born 28 August 1992) is an Indian actor known for portraying Radhe in Bandish Bandits and Sanket Bhadoria in The Whistleblower.

== Career ==
In 2017, he made his acting debut on the digital platform with the TVF web series Office VS Office. In 2019, he made his film debut in the lead role in the Bengali drama film Dhuusar as Shiladitya Guha. He worked in a Netflix show titled Gabru, and also appeared in several videos for FilterCopy Talkies.

In 2020, he starred in Anand Tiwari's musical romantic drama Bandish Bandits, which premiered on Amazon Prime, where he played the lead role of a trained classical singer, Radhe Rathore, opposite Shreya Chaudhary. In 2022, he featured in Prime's anthology series Modern Love Mumbai opposite Masaba Gupta, and in Maja Ma opposite Barkha Singh. In 2024, he reprised his role as Radhe in the second season of Bandish Bandits. He is set to make his Bengali film debut with Rahool Mukherjee's Mon Maaney Na (2026 Bengali Film), starring opposite Hiya Chatterjee, daughter of Saswata Chatterjee, who is also making her debut with this film.

== Filmography ==
=== Films ===
Year	Title	Role	Notes	Ref.
2019	Cargo	Aggressive Cargo		
2019	Dhuusar	Shiladitya Guha		
2020	Life Is Ruff	Faizaan	Short film	
2020	Haba Goba	Kush	Short film	
2022	Maja Ma	Tejas Patel		
2026	Mon Maaney Na	Rahul Sen	Bengali Debut	
2026	Meethe Mein Kya Hai	Jai Agarwal	Netflix film	
2027	Maharaja Tomare Selam			

=== Web series ===
Year	Title	Role	Notes	Ref.
2017	Office vs. Office	Baldev		
2018	FilterCopy Talkies	Joy	Season 1; Episode 5	
2020–2024	Bandish Bandits	Radhemohan "Radhe" Rathod Jr.		
2021	The Whistleblower	Dr. Sanket Bhadoria		
2022	Modern Love Mumbai	Parth	Season 1; Episode 5	
2023	Jehanabad - Of Love & War	Abhimanyu Singh		
2023	Sweet Kaaram Coffee	Radhemohan "Radhe" Rathod Jr.	Guest appearance	
2024	Butterflies	Rohan	Season 5; Episode 1	
2024	The Pickle Factory	Deb		
2025	Fasco	Atul Kar		
2025	Khakee: The Bengal Chapter	Sagor Talukdar		

=== Music videos ===
Year	Title	Singer	Ref.
2020	Khidki	Papon	
2021	Qatra	Stebin Ben	

== Awards and nominations ==
Year	Award	Category	Work	Result	Ref.
2022	22nd Indian Television Academy Awards	Popular Actor - OTT	The Whistleblower	Nominated	
