= Kachher Manush =

2022 Indian Bengali-language film

Kacher Manush
- Official Theatrical Poster
- Directed by: Pathikrit Basu
- Written by: Pathikrit Basu (Story); Shubhendu Dasmunshi; Arnab Bhaumik; Priya Das (Screenplay & Dialogues)
- Produced by: Dev
- Starring: Prosenjit Chatterjee; Dev; Ishaa Saha; Susmita Chatterjee
- Cinematography: Modhura Palit
- Edited by: MD. Kalam
- Music by: Nilayan Chatterjee
- Production company: Dev Entertainment Ventures
- Distributed by: SSR Cinemas
- Release date: 30 September 2022
- Running time: 135:29 minutes
- Country: India
- Language: Bengali

Kachher Manush (transl. Close people) is a 2022 Indian Bengali-language black comedy-drama thriller film co-written and directed by Pathikrit Basu. It is produced by Dev under the banner of Dev Entertainment Ventures. The film stars Prosenjit Chatterjee, along with Dev, and Ishaa Saha. The story revolves around Kuntol and Sudarshan who meet when they are at their lowest point in life. On hearing Kuntol's story, Sudarshan gets a dangerous idea that can solve both their problems. It results in a hide and seek game with life.

== Plot ==
Kuntol is suffering from suicidal depression as he is unable to cope up with the fact that he is responsible for his brother's death as well as his mother's paralysis. He is rescued from the railway tracks by Sudarshan, an eccentric man, who comes up with a policy wherein the nominee gets a huge amount of money if the policy-holder meets an accidental death. Sudarshan suggests that Kuntol be the policy-holder and he himself be the nominee, so that after Kuntol's suicide, Sudarshan will take care of Kuntol's mother as well as pay for his sister Kusum's surgery with the policy-money. Though Kuntol agrees at first, he is unable to commit suicide after he falls in love with Alo, who is revealed to be none other than Sudarshan's sister. Thereafter, Sudarshan becomes hellbent on killing Kuntol so as to pay for his mortally ill sister's treatment. What results is a life-and-death game between Kuntol and Sudarshan.

== Cast ==
- Prosenjit Chatterjee as Sudarshan Ghosh
- Dev as Kuntal Sarkar
- Ishaa Saha as Alo/Kusum
- Ranjit Mullick as industrialist Bikash Sengupta (cameo)
- Susmita Chatterjee as Asha(cameo)
- Sanjib Sarkar as local leader Sadeq Ali

== Soundtrack ==
Kacher Manush

Soundtrack album by Nilayan Chatterjee
- Released: 25 September 2022
- Genre: Feature film soundtrack
- Length: 19:43
- Language: Bengali
- Label: Sony Music East

Track listing
No.	Title	Singer(s)	Length
1.	"Are Are Bondhu"	Amit Kumar, Shaan	3:10
2.	"Chumbok Mon"	Usha Uthup	3:00
3.	"Mukti Dao"	Sonu Nigam	4:10
4.	"Taka Lage"	Pranjal Biswas	3:25
5.	"Ke Bole Manush More"	Kuthi Mansur, Parvathy Baul	5:58
Total length:			19:43

== Release ==
The film was released on 30 September 2022, just before Durga Puja.
