= Ei Samay =

Bengali-language daily newspaper

Ei Samay Sangbadpatra

- The front page of the edition of Ei Samay on 5 May 2026.
- Type: Online news portal
- Format: Digital
- Owners: Tidings Media and Communications Pvt Ltd; Sanjay Basu; Anurag Chaudhary
- Publisher: Tidings Media and Communications Pvt Ltd
- Editor-in-chief: Hirak Bandyopadhyay
- Founded: 15 October 2012 (Daily Newspaper)
- Language: Bengali
- Headquarters: Kolkata, West Bengal, India
- Country: India
- Circulation: 242,022 Daily (as of December 2019)
- Sister newspapers: Ei Samay Online (Bengali Digital) News Ei Samay (English Digital) Samachar Ei Samay (Hindi Digital)
- Website: www.eisamay.com www.newseisamay.com www.samachareisamay.com

Ei Samay is a Bengali-language daily newspaper and digital news platform headquartered in Kolkata, West Bengal. As of 2026, it is owned by Tidings Media and Communication Private Ltd, following its sale by the Times Group in 2024.

Times Group sold Ei Samay to Tidings Media and Communication Private Ltd in 2024.

While the main language is Bengali, it has expanded into multi-language digital reporting:

News Ei Samay (English): A digital news portal launched in late 2025 to provide English-language coverage for young professionals and a global audience. It brings stories in English from the region to a wider audience, blending an approach of strong local reporting with a national and international outlooks.

Samachar Ei Samay (Hindi): A Hindi-language digital platform introduced simultaneously with the English version to cater to Hindi-speaking readers.

Eisamay.com (Bengali): The primary digital hub for real-time news in Bengali, featuring sections on West Bengal, Kolkata local updates, and international news.

The newspaper was originally launched on 15 October 2012, by The Times Group to compete directly with dominant publications like Anandabazar Patrika. In mid-2024, the publication transitioned to new ownership under Tidings Media & Communications Private Limited, a firm led by advocate Sanjay Basu and industrialist Anurag Chaudhary.

== Pre-launch scenario ==
The vernacular print media space in West Bengal comprises four major Bengali dailies: Anandabazar Patrika, Aajkaal, Bartaman and Sangbad Pratidin. Out of these, Anandabazar Patrika is said to be the dominant leader in the Bengali print media space and ranks 6th among the top 10 vernacular dailies in India as per Indian Readership Survey 2012, with a readership of about 59 lakhs.

== Sections ==
Regular sections

- Ei Muhurte: contains essays on different topics, tips, and analysis on different subjects like graphology and share market
- Ei Shahar: contains news and articles related to Kolkata
- Ei Rajya: contains news and articles related to West Bengal
- Ei Desh: deals with news of national interest
- Sompadokiyo: contains editorial, on this date, essays
- Khelar Samay: sports section contains news on different sports
- Byabsa Banijyo: business section contains news related to business, economics and finance

Other sections

- Onnya Samay: regular supplement
- Robibaroyari: Sunday special.

== Editions ==
Currently this daily is published from Kolkata and New Delhi.
