= List of Indian Bengali films of the 1980s =

A list of films produced by the Tollywood (Bengali language film industry) based in Kolkata in the 1980s.

== 1980 ==
Title	Director	Cast	Genre	Notes
Aro Ekjan	Srijan	Uttam Kumar, Sumitra Mukherjee, Samit Bhanja		
Banchharamer Bagaan	Tapan Sinha	Manoj Mitra, Dipankar De, Nirmal Kumar Chakraborty		
Bhagya Chakra	Ajoy Biswas	Ranjit Mallick, Mithu Mukherjee, Sandhya Roy	Romance, Drama	
Chattogram Astragar Lunthan	Nirmal Chowdhury	Dipti Roy, Banani Choudhury, Aparna Devi	Patriotic	
Dadar Kirti	Tarun Majumdar	Tapas Paul, Mahua Roychoudhury, Debashree Roy	Romance, Drama	
Dui Prithibi	Piyush Bose	Uttam Kumar, Ranjit Mallick, Supriya Chowdhury	Drama	
Hirak Rajar Deshe	Satyajit Ray	Tapen Chatterjee, Rabi Ghosh, Utpal Dutt	Dystopian Fantasy	
Paka Dekha	Arabinda Mukherjee	Utpal Dutt, Mahua Roychoudhury, Rabi Ghosh	Comedy, Drama	
Pankhiraj	Piyush Bose	Soumitra Chatterjee, Utpal Dutt, Samit Bhanja		
Parabesh	Kalpataru	Samit Bhanja, Mahua Roychoudhury, Santu Mukhopadhyay	Drama	
Pikoo	Satyajit Ray	Arjun Guha Thakurta, Aparna Sen, Victor Banerjee		
Rajnandini	Sukhen Das	Uttam Kumar, Bikash Roy, Subhendu Chatterjee	Romantic Drama	
Samadhan	Jayanta Basu	Dipankar De, Rabi Ghosh, Uttam Kumar		

== 1981 ==
Title	Director	Cast	Genre	Notes/Music
36 Chowringhee Lane	Aparna Sen	Jennifer Kendal, Debashree Roy, Dhritiman Chatterjee	Drama	
Aaj Kal Parsur Galpa	Nabyendu Chatterjee	Mahua Roychoudhury, Dipankar Dey, Niranjan Ray	Drama	
Abichar	Biswajit Chatterjee	Biswajit Chatterjee, Aparna Sen, Bikash Roy	Drama	
Adalat o Ekti Meye	Tapan Sinha	Jennifer Kendal, Manoj Mitra	Drama	
Baishakhi Megh	Utpal Dutt	Rabi Ghosh, Utpal Dutt, Ramaprasad Banik		
Bodhan	Amal Dutta	Mahua Roychoudhury, Dipankar De, Sumitra Mukherjee	Drama	
Bondi Balaka	Inder Sen	Aparna Sen, Dipankar De, Sumitra Mukhopadhyay		Shyamal Mitra
Choto Bakulpurer Jatri	Purnendu Pattrea	Snigda Banerjee, Parthasarathi Deb, Tarit Chowdhury		
Dakhal	Goutam Ghose	Mamata Shankar		Won National Film Award for Best Feature Film
Dooratwa	Buddhadev Dasgupta	Bijon Bhattacharya, Pradip Mukherjee	Drama	
Dustu Misti	Rajkumar Roychoudhuri	Panchali Sen, Swati Biswas, Kanika Mazumder, Jayashree Roy, Sreetama Gope	Children	Abhijit Bandyopadhyay
Kakhono Megh	Agradoot	Uttam Kumar, Anjana Bhowmik, Kali Banerjee		
Kalankini Kankabati	Uttam Kumar	Mithun Chakraborty, Sharmila Tagore, Supriya Devi	Crime Drama	
Kapalkundala	Pinaki Bhushan Mukherji	Bhanu Bannerjee, Samita Biswas, Ranjit Mallick		
Khana Baraha	Bijoy Bose	Uttam Kumar, Sandhya Roy	Historical Drama	
Mahakabi Krittibas	Ashok Chakraborty	Lily Chakravarty, Ashim Kumar, Tarun Kumar		
Nyay Anyay	Sukhen Das	Soumitra Chatterjee, Sumitra Mukherjee, Shubhendru Chattopadhyay	Drama	
Ogo Bodhu Shundori	Salil Dutta	Uttam Kumar, Moushumi Chatterjee, Santosh Dutta	Comedy	
Plot No. 5	Yogesh Saxena	Vikas Anand, Benjamin Gilani, Amjad Khan		
Pratisodh	Sukhen Das	Soumitra Chatterjee, Sumitra Mukherjee, Mahua Roychoudhury	Drama	
Simabaddha	Satyajit Ray	Sharmila Tagore, Barun Chanda, Dipankar Dey		
Subarna Golak	Manu Sen	Prosenjit Chatterjee, Debashree Roy, Utpal Dutt	Comedy Drama	
Surya Sakkhi	Gautam Mukherjee	Mithun Chakraborty, Debashree Roy, Soumitra Bannerjee	Romantic Drama	
Upalabdhi	Tapan Saha	Mithun Chakraborty, Mahua Roychoudhury, Anil Chatterjee, Cheratra Radasinghe		

== 1982 ==
Title	Director	Cast	Genre	Notes	Ref.
Akaler Shandhaney	Mrinal Sen	Dhritiman Chatterjee, Smita Patil	Documentary		
Amrita Kumbher Sandhane	Dilip Roy	Subhendu Chatterjee, Aparna Sen	Documentary		
Bandini Kamala	Bhimal Bhowmick	Sarika Thakur, Madhavi Mukherjee, Chhaya Devi			
Bijayini	Palash Bandopadhyay	Soumitra Chatterjee, Aparna Sen, Ranjit Mallick	Drama		
Chokh	Utpalendu Chakrabarty	Om Puri, Anil Chatterjee, Shyamanand Jalan, Sreela Majumdar	Drama	National Film Award for Best Feature Film, Best Direction	
Dulia	Saikat Bhattacharya				
Faisala	Raaj	Samit Bhanja, Santu Mukhopadhyay, Mahua Roychoudhury	Drama		
Grihajuddha	Buddhadev Dasgupta	Sunil Mukherjee, Anjan Dutt			
Jake Ghoosh Dite Hoy	Saikat Bhattacharya	Pradip Mukherjee, Devika Mukherjee, Haradan Bandopadhyay	Drama		
Kharij	Mrinal Sen	Anjan Dutt, Mamata Shankar, Sreela Majumdar		Won the Jury Prize at the 1983 Cannes Film Festival	
Ma Bhabani Ma Amar	Sadhan Chowdhury	Gurudas Banerjee, Asit Bharan, Padma Devi	Devotional		
Ma Kalyaneswari	Shree Krishna	Sandhya Rani, Nandini Maliya, Gita Pradhan	Devotional		
Mayer Ashirvad	Parimal Ghosh	Dipankar Dey, Sumitra Mukherjee, Soma Dey	Drama		
Prafulla	Sujoy Dutta	Sumitra Mukherjee, Santu Mukherjee, Madhavi Mukherjee			
Preyasi	Shrikant Guha-Thakurta	Bhanu Bannerjee, Kali Bannerjee, Soumitra Chatterjee			
Rajbadhu	Partha Pratim Chowdhury	Ranjit Mallick, Moon Moon Sen, Utpal Dutt, Rabi Ghosh	Drama		
Shathe Shathyang	Dinen Gupta	Ranjit Mallick, Mahua Roy Chowdhury, Sumitra Mukherjee, Shekhar Chatterjee	Action, comedy		
Sonar Bangla	Kedar Agarwal, Ardhendu Chatterjee	Biswajit Chatterjee, Vasant Choudhury, Mahua Roy Chowdhury			
Swarna Mahal	Sukhen Das	Shambu Bhattacharya, Lily Chakravarty, Anil Chatterjee			
Troyee	Gautam Mukherjee	Mithun Chakraborty, Debashree Roy, Soumitra Bannerjee	Romantic drama		

== 1983 ==
Title	Director	Cast	Genre	Notes
Abhinoy Noy	Archan Chakraborty	Aparna Sen, Anup Kumar	Romance	
Agami Kal	Tapan Saha	Kali Bannerjee, Utpal Dutt, Rita Bannerjee		
Agradani	Palash Bannerjee	Soumitra Chatterjee, Anil Chatterjee	Drama	
Amar Geeti	Tarun Majumdar	George Baker, Satya Bannerjee, Biswajit Chatterjee		
Aparupa	Bidesh Sarkar	Debashree Roy, Prosenjit Chatterjee, Madhu Kapoor, Rabi Ghosh	Romance, Drama	
Arpita	Arabinda Mukhopadhyay	Dipankar De, Aparna Sen, Sumitra Mukherjee		
Ashleelotar Daye	Uma Nath Bhattacharya	Chiranjit Chakraborty, Alpana Goswami	Drama	
Chena Achena	Pinaki Choudhury	Soumitra Chatterjee, Amol Palekar	Drama	
Din Jai	Manu Sen	Mahua Roychoudhury, Joy Sengupta, Chiranjit Chakraborty	Romance, Drama	
Duranta Jay	Ardhendu Mukherjee	Bikash Roy, Anil Chatterjee, Nirmal Kumar	Romance	
Duti Pata	Bimal Roy, jr.	Utpal Dutt, Rabi Ghosh		
Indira	Dinen Gupta	Aparna Sen, Soumitra Chatterjee, Sumitra Mukherjee		
Nishi Bhor	Rashbehari Sengupta	Debashree Roy, Somnata Chowdhury, Sandhya Rani	Drama	
Phatik Chand	Sandip Ray	Kamu Mukherjee, Rajib Ganguly	Children's	
Protidan	Prabhat Roy	Victor Bannerjee, Naseeruddin Shah, Sharmila Tagore	Action Drama	
Rajeswari	Salil Dutta	Tapas Paul, Moon Moon Sen, Mahua Roychoudhury	Drama	
Sagar Balaka	Dinen Gupta	Debashree Roy, Dipankar Dey, Soma Dey		
Samarpita	Gurudas Bagchi	Chiranjit Chakraborty, Rabi Ghosh, Ruma Guha Thakurta		
Samapti	Bijoy Bose	Ajoy Bannerjee, Laxmi Bannerjee, Rita Bannerjee		
Shilalipi	Palash Bandopadhyay	Tanuja, Ashok Kumar, Santu Mukhopadhyay		
Utsargo	Tapan Saha	Santu Mukhopadhyay, Mahua Roychoudhury, Rajeswari Roychoudhury	Drama	

== 1984 ==
Title	Director	Cast	Genre	Notes
Abhishek	Subhash Mukhopadhyay	Aalpana Goswami, Bidisha Sinha	Romance	
Agnishuddhi	Sachin Adhikari	Anup Kumar, Dipankar De	Romance	
Ajantay	Arvind Mukherjee	Moon Moon Sen, Tapas Paul, Alpana Goswami	Romance, Drama	
Bishabriksha	Ajoy Kar	Ranjit Mallick, Aparna Sen, Debashree Roy	Romance	
Dadamoni	Sujit Guha	Sukhen Das, Sandhya Rani, Sumitra Mukherjee		
Dakhal	Gautam Ghose	Mamata Shankar, Robin Sengupta, Sunil Mukherjee		
Debigarjan	Pijushkanti Gangopadhyay	Anil Chatterjee, Samit Bhanja, Gyanesh Mukherjee	Drama	
Deepar Prem	Arundhati Devi	Tapas Paul, Moon Moon Sen		
Devi Chowdhurani	Dinen Gupta	Suchitra Sen, Ranjit Mallick, Basanta Choudhury	Drama	
Didi	Swadesh Sarkar	Sumitra Mukherjee, Samit Bhanja, Anil Chatterjee		
Ghare Baire	Satyajit Ray	Soumitra Chatterjee, Victor Bannerjee, Jennifer Kendal	Romance, Drama	
Harishchandra Shaibya	Ardhendu Chatterjee	Biswajit Chatterjee, Sandhya Roy, Tapas Paul, Anup Kumar, Alka Nupur	Religious	
Kony	Saroj Dey	Soumitra Chatterjee, Sriparna Bannerjee	Drama	
Lalita	Tapan Choudhury	Dipankar Dey, Santosh Dutta	Drama	
Madhuban	Ajoy Kar	Victor Banerjee, Utpal Dutt, Swarup Dutt	Drama	
Pragaitihasik	Jochon Dastidar	Mridul Sen, Sujit Ghosh, Bhabatosh Banerjee		
Prarthana	Asit Sen	Victor Bannerjee, Moushumi Chatterjee, Debashree Roy		
Shatru	Anjan Choudhury	Ranjit Mallick, Anup Kumar, Chiranjit Chakraborty		
Pujarini	Partha Pratim Chowdhury	Prosenjit Chatterjee, Ranjit Mallick, Moon Moon Sen, Utpal Dutt	Romance, Drama	

== 1985 ==
Title	Director	Cast	Genre	Notes
Aamar Prithibi	Bimal Bhowmik	Anil Chatterjee, Anup Kumar	Romance	
Ahuti	Prabir Mitra	Ranjit Mallick, Anup Kumar	Romance	
Aloye Phera	Ajit Ganguly	Dipankar Dey, Anil Chatterjee, Rabi Ghosh	Drama	
Antarale	Shantanu Mitra	Chiranjit Chakraborty, Moon Moon Sen		
Anweshan	Shankar Bhattacharya	Sumitra Mukherjee, Pradip Mukherjee, Sabitri Chatterjee	Thriller	
Anyay Abichar	Shakti Samanta	Rozina, Mithun Chakraborty	Romance	
Baidurya Rahasya	Tapan Sinha	Basanta Choudhury, Moon Moon Sen, Tapas Paul, Manoj Mitra	Thriller	
Baikunther Will	Sushil Mukherjee	Soumitra Chatterjee, Sandhya Rani, Satya Bannerjee		
Bhalobasa Bhalobasa	Tarun Majumdar	Tapas Paul, Debashree Roy, Sumitra Mukherjee, Madhabi Mukherjee and others	Family Romance	
Devika	Anil Ghosh	Ranjit Mallick, Aparna Sen, Kali Banerjee	Drama	
Harishchandra Shaibya	Ardhendu Chatterjee	Biswajit Chatterjee, Sandhya Roy	Religious Drama	
Jiban Sathi	Adhir Bhat	Samit Bhanja, Alpana Goswami, Madhabi Chakraborty	Drama	
Neelakantha	Indrajit	Anurag, Soma Roy, Jeniva, Ruma Bhattacharya	Drama	
Nishantey	Narayan Chakraborty	Tapas Paul, Debashree Roy	Romance	
Palataka	Swaran Dey	Prosenjit Chatterjee, Sanghamitra Bandopadhyay, Babita Chakraborty		
Parama	Aparna Sen	Raakhee, Aparna Sen, Anil Chatterjee	Drama	
Phoolan Devi	Ashok Roy	Rita Bhaduri, Suresh Oberoi, Joy Mukherjee	Action	
Pratignya	Asit Sen	Moushumi Chatterjee, Victor Bannerjee, Papiya Adhikari		
Sonar Sansar	Rathish Dey Sarkar	Sumitra Mukherjee, Kali Bannerjee, Anil Chatterjee		
Till Theke Thal	Shantimoy Bannerjee	Sabitri Chatterjee, Sumitra Mukherjee, Sanchita Basu		

== 1986 ==
Title	Director	Cast	Genre	Notes
Abhiman	Sujit Guha	Ranjit Mallick, Mahua Roychoudhury, Sukhen Das, Rabi Ghosh	Romance	
Abhishap	Biresh Chattopadhyay	Ranjit Mallick, Debashree Roy	Romance	
Amar Bandhan	Tapan Saha	Babita Adhikari, Nirmal Kumar Chakraborty, Subhendru Chatterjee		
Amar Kantak	Sukhen Das	Chiranjeet Chakraborty, Moon Moon Sen	Drama	
Anurager Chowa	Jahar Biswas	Tapas Paul, Subhendu Chatterjee, Madhavi Mukherjee		
Ashirbad	Biresh Chatterjee	Tapas Paul, Mahua Roychoudhury, Anil Chatterjee	Romance, Drama	
Atanka	Tapan Sinha	Ranjit Mallick, Kali Bannerjee, Anil Chatterjee		
Bouma	Sujit Guha	Ranjit Mallick, Sandhya Roy, Sanghomitra Banerjee, Prasenjit Chatterjee, Satabdi Roy, Samit Bhanja, Satya Bandopadhyay	Romance, Drama	
Muktapran	Samir Ghosh	Ranjit Mallick, Sumitra Mukherjee, Joy Banerjee		
Pathbhola	Tarun Majumder	Prosenjit Chatterjee, Tapas Paul, Abhishek Chatterjee, Utpal Dutt	Action	
Prem O Paap	Umanath Bhattacharya	Chiranjeet Chakraborty, Mahua Roychoudhury, Sumitra Mukherjee	Romance, Drama	
Shapmukti	Ajit Ganguly	Dipankar De, Mahua Roy Chowdhury, Biplab Chatterjee		
Shyam Saheb	Salil Dutta	Aparna Sen, Soumitra Chatterjee, Dipankar Dey	Drama	
Swarga Sukh	Bablu Sammadar	Ranjit Mallick, Alpana Goswami, Anup Kumar, Meenakshi Goswami	Drama	
Tin Purush	Umanath Bhattacharya	Prosenjit Chatterjee, Debashree Roy, Satya Bandyopadhyay	Drama	

== 1987 ==
Title	Director	Cast	Genre	Notes
Abhishek	Pavan Kaul	Aditya Pancholi, Archana Puran Singh, Nitish Bharadwaj		
Abir	Kajal Majumdar	Tarun Kumar, Mahua Roychoudhury	Romance	
Amar Sangi	Sujit Guha	Prasenjit Chatterjee, Rabi Ghosh, Ruma Guha Thakurta	Romance	
Antarjali Jatra	Goutam Ghose	Shatrughan Sinha, Vasant Choudhury	Drama	
Apon Gharey	Pinaki Bhushan Mukherjee	Debashish Ghosh		
Arpan	Srinivas Chakraborty	Tapas Paul, Debashree Roy, Prasenjit Chatterjee		
Bandook Baj	Goutam Gupta	Madhabi Chakraborty, Anil Chatterjee, Koushik Chattopadhyay	Drama	
Bidrohi	Anjan Choudhury	Ranjit Mallick, Santu Mukhopadhyay, Alpana Goswami	Drama	
Contemporary Indian Sculpture	Buddhadev Dasgupta		Documentary	
Dabar Chal	Kumar Chowdhury	Dipankar Dey, Alpana Goswami, Anup Kumar		
Dolon Chanpa	Sujit Guha	Sandhya Roy, Ranjit Mallick, Rajeshwari Raychowdhury		
Ekanto Apon	Biresh Chattopadhyay	Victor Banerjee, Aparna Sen, Satabdi Roy, Shakuntala Barua, Subhendu Chatterjee, Master Tapu	Romance, Drama	
Gayak	Shantanu Bhowmick	Amit Kumar, Chiranjeet Chakraborty, Debashree Roy, Ruma Guha Thakurta, Dipankar De, R. D. Burman, Mithun Chakraborty, Kalpana Iyer	Musical, Drama, Action	
Guru Dakshina	Anjan Choudhury	Ranjit Mallick, Tapas Paul, Satabdi Roy	Drama	
Jar Je Priya	Salil Dutta	Tapas Paul, Aparna Sen, Utpal Dutt		
Madhuganjer Sumati	Agantuk	Satya Banerjee, Dipti Roy, Chiranjeet Chakraborty	Drama	
Maha Milan	Dinen Gupta	Ranjit Mallick, Sumitra Mukherjee, Alpana Goswami	Drama	
Maha Yatra	Goutam Ghose	Mohan Agashe, Kalyan Chatterjee, Vasant Choudhury		
Mouna Mukhar	Samit Bannerjee	Debashree Roy, Chiranjit Chakraborty, Prasenjit Chakraborty		
Nirjan Sanlap	Archana Chakraborty	Anil Chatterjee, Sumitra Mukherjee, Soma Dey	Drama	
Pap Punnya	Rajat Das	Tapas Paul, Chiranjit Chakraborty, Indrani Dutta	Romance, Drama	
Pratibha	Hiren Nag	George Baker, Ayan Bannerjee, Satya Bannerjee		
Pratikar	Prabhat Roy	Victor Banerjee, Chiranjit Chakraborty, Madhabi Mukherjee, Debashree Roy, Satabdi Roy, Shakuntala Barua, Utpal Dutt	Action, Drama	
Ranima	Abanish Banerjee	Sumitra Mukherjee, Dipankar Dey, Shashi Puri		
Rudrabeena	Pinaki Mukherjee	Ranjit Mallick, Tapas Paul, Madhabi Mukherjee	Drama	
Samrat O Sundari	Bimal Roy, jr.	Utpal Dutt, Rabi Ghosh		
Sukumar Ray	Satyajit Ray	Utpal Dutt, Soumitra Chatterjee, Tapen Chatterjee	Documentary	
Swarnamoyeer Thikana	Sushil Mukherjee	Prasenjit Chatterjee, Papiya Adhikar, Sumitra Mukherjee		
Tania	Ramaprasad Chakraborty	Sumitra Mukherjee, Dipankar De, Tarun Kumar	Drama	

== 1988 ==
Title	Director	Cast	Genre	Notes
Aagoon	Victor Banerjee	Victor Banerjee, Tanuja, Soumitra Chatterjee, Utpal Dutt	Drama	
Adwitiya	Nabyendu Chatterjee	Madhabi Mukherjee, Sarbendra, Bikash Roy, Daisy Irani	Drama	
Agaman	Tarun Majumdar	Soumitra Chatterjee, Tapas Paul	Romance	
Aghat	Deb Singha	Chiranjit Chakraborty, Prosenjit Chatterjee	Romance	
Agni Sanket	Aroop Dutta	Satya Bannerjee, Kumkum Bhattacharya, Premangshu Bose		
Anjali	Anjan Choudhury	Ranjit Mallick, Moon Moon Sen, Kali Banerjee	Romance, Drama	
Antaranga	Dinen Gupta	Tapas Paul, Satabdi Roy, Vasant Choudhury		
Apaman	Chandan Mukherjee	Prosenjit Chatterjee, Tarun Kumar	Drama	
Apon Gharey	Pinaki Chaudhuri	Prosenjit Chatterjee, Subhendu Chatterjee, Chhaya Devi		
Boba Sanai	Ajit Ganguly	Rameshwari, Chiranjit Chakraborty, Sukhen Das		
Channachara	Anjan Mukherjee	Prosenjit Chatterjee, Tapas Paul, Sunil Mukherjee		
Choto Bou	Anjan Choudhury	Prosenjit Chatterjee, Ranjit Mallick, Sandhya Roy	Drama	
Debi Baran	Srikanta Guha Thakurta	Prosenjit Chatterjee, Debashree Roy, Ranjit Mallick	Romance, Drama	
Deepshikha	Amal Nag	Joy Banerjee, Papia Adhikari, Madhabi Mukherjee	Drama	
Dena Paona	Sukhen Das	Dipankar De, Soumitra Bannerjee, Satabdi Roy, Sukhen Das, Anup Kumar, Joy Banerjee, Ratna Ghoshal	Drama	
Hirer Shikal	Murari Chakraborty	Chiranjit Chakraborty, Debashree Roy	Drama	
Jyoti	Shabda Kumar	Prosenjit Chatterjee, Anuradha Patel	Romance	
Kidnap	Aabir Basu	Dipankar Dey, Shakuntala Barua, Manoj Mitra	Drama	
Krishna Bhakta Sudama	Kedar Agarwal	Biswajit Chatterjee, Bharat Bhushan, Gita Dey	Devotional	
Maa Ek Mandir	Sukhen Das			
Ora Charjon	Samit Bhanja	Prosenjit Chatterjee, Debashree Roy	Action Drama	
Parashmoni	Tarun Majumder	Tapas Paul, Satabdi Roy, Santu Mukhopadhyay	Family Drama	
Pathe Jete Jete	Umanath Bhat	Tapas Paul, Papiya Adhikari, Dilip Roy	Romance, Drama	
Phera	Buddhadeb Dasgupta	Aloknanda Roy, Kamu Mukherjee, Sunil Mukherjee	Drama	Entered into the 38th Berlin International Film Festival
Pratik	Prabhat Roy	Rakhee Gulzar, Soumitra Chatterjee, Chiranjit Chakraborty		
Pratipaksha	Rathish Dey Sarkar	Prosenjit Chatterjee, Rameshwari, Utpal Dutt		
Punarmilan	Jayanta Basu			
Sudhu Tomari	Prabir Mitra	Prosenjit Chatterjee, Tapas Paul, Satabdi Roy	Romance, Drama	
Surer Akashe	Biresh Chatterjee	Tapas Paul, Debashree Roy, Abhishek Chatterjee	Drama	
Surer Sathi	Tapan Saha	Tapas Paul, Debashree Roy, Anil Chatterjee	Romance, Drama	
Tumi Koto Sundar	Manoj Ghosh	Tapas Paul, Moon Moon Sen, Nirmal Kumar Chakraborty		

== 1989 ==
Title	Director	Cast	Genre	Notes/Music
Aakrosh	Sujit Guha	Victor Banerjee, Debashree Roy, Prosenjit Chatterjee, Ranjit Mallick	Romance, Drama	Rahul Dev Burman
Aamar Shapath	Prabhat Roy	Prosenjit Chatterjee, Satabdi Roy, Soumitra Chatterjee	Romance	Kanu Bhattacharya
Aamar Tumi	Bimal Ray, jr.	Prosenjit Chatterjee, Farah, Rabi Ghosh	Romance	Bappi Lahiri
Agni Trishna	Prabhat Roy	Chiranjit Chakraborty, Satabdi Roy, Ranjit Mallick, Rupa Ganguly	Drama	Bappi Lahiri
Amar Prem	Sujit Guha	Prosenjit Chatterjee, Juhi Chawla, Haradhan Bandopadhyay	Romance	Bappi Lahiri
Amanat	Santanu Bhowmik	Prosenjit Chatterjee, Satabdi Roy, Rupa Ganguly, Sumitra Mukherjee, Shakuntala Barua, Deepankar Dey	Romance	Amit Kumar
Angar	Srinivas Chakraborty	Tapas Paul, Satabdi Roy, Utpal Dutt		
Aparanher Alo	Agradoot	Debashree Roy, Prosenjit Chatterjee, Sandhya Rani		
Asha	Anup Sengupta	Tapas Paul, Debashree Roy, Rajeshwari Roychowdhury		
Asha O Bhalobasha	Sujit Guha	Prosenjit Chatterjee, Deepika Chikhalia	Romance, Drama	Bappi Lahiri
Bagh Bahadur	Buddhadev Dasgupta	Archana, Pavan Malhotra	Drama	Shantanu Mohapatra
Bandhabi	Shankar Bhattacharya	Santu Mukhopadhyay, Moon Moon Sen, Devika Mukherjee	Romance, Drama	
Bandini	Sujit Guha	Ranjit Mallick, Moushumi Chatterjee, Prosenjit Chatterjee, Satabdi Roy, Sandhya Rani	Romance, Drama	Kanu Bhattacharya
Bidai	Ajit Ganguly	Prosenjit Chatterjee, Satabdi Roy, Sandhya Rani	Romance, Drama	
Chandaneer	Utpalendu Chakrabarty	Debashree Roy, Madhabi Mukherjee, Ajoy Chakraborty		
Chhoto Bou	Anjan Choudhury	Prosenjit Chatterjee, Devika Mukherjee, Ranjit Mallick		
Chokher Aloy	Sachin Adhikari	Tapas Paul, Debashree Roy	Romance	Bappi Lahiri
Jaj Saheb	Pijush Debnath	Prosenjit Chatterjee, Satabdi Roy, Ranjit Mallick	Thriller	
Jhankar	Sujit Guha	Prosenjit Chatterjee, Debashree Roy, Samit Bhanja		
Kari Diye Kinlam	Biresh Chattopadhyay	Aparna Sen, Moushumi Chatterjee, Supriya Devi, Madhabi Mukherjee, Tapas Paul, Arjun Chakraborty, Shakuntala Barua, Utpal Dutta, Haradhan Banerjee	Romance, Drama	Swapan Chakraborty
Mahapith Tarapith	Guru Bagchi	Chiranjeet Chakraborty, Satabdi Roy, Sumitra Mukherjee	Devotional	
Mandanda	Pinaki Chowdhury	Nirmal Kumar Chakraborty, Urmi Chakraborty, Biplab Chatterjee		
Mangal Deep	Haranath Chakraborty	Ranjit Mallick, Haradhan Bannerjee, Kali Bannerjee		
Maryada	Chiranjeet Chakraborty	Chiranjeet Chakraborty, Satabdi Roy, Sandhya Rani	Drama	Babul Bose
Mone Mone	Partha Pratim Chowdhury	Satabdi Roy, Prosenjit Chatterjee, Nirmal Kumar	Romance, Drama	Kanu Bhattacharya
Nishi Trishna	Parimal Bhattacharya	Prosenjit Chatterjee, Shekhar Chatterjee, Moon Moon Sen	Horror	
Nutan Surja	Sachin Adhikari	Papia Adhikari, Mita Bannerjee, Abhishek Chatterjee		
Parshuramer Kuthar	Nabyendu Chatterjee	Sreelekha Mukherjee, Arun Mukhopadhyay	Drama	
Pronomi Tomaya	Prabhat Roy	Prosenjit Chatterjee, Reshma Singh, Arjun Chakraborty	Romance, Drama	Bappi Lahiri
Satarupa	Palash Bandopadhyay	Ranjit Mallick, Moushumi Chatterjee, Soumitra Banerjee	Romance, Drama	Rahul Dev Burman
Sati	Aparna Sen	Shabana Azmi, Arun Bannerjee	Drama	Chidananda Das Gupta, Chandan Raichaudhri
Shatru Pakhha	Nripen Saha	Chiranjeet, Prosenjit Chatterjee, Satabdi Roy	Drama	Sumit Bandopadhyay
Sreemati Hansaraj	Ajit Ganguly	Satabdi Roy, Kunal Dutta, Soumitra Bannerjee		
Toofan	Biresh Chattopadhyay	Chiranjeet Chakraborty, Tapas Paul, Indrani Dutta, Abhishek Chatterjee, Shakuntala Barua, Rupa Ganguly, Nayana Bandopadhyay, Soma Dey, Dilip Roy	Romance, Drama	Swapan Chakraborty
