= Bengal Film Journalists' Association – Best Supporting Actor Award =

Indian film award

Here is a list of the Bengal Film Journalists' Association Best Supporting Actor Award winners and the films for which they won.

Year	Director	Film
2018	Kaushik Ganguly	Mayurakshi
2007	Anjan Das Rudranil Ghosh	Faltu Kantatar and Refugee
2006	Sekhar Das	Krantikaal
2005	Anjan Das	Iti Sreekanta
2004	Goutam Ghose	Abar Aranye
2003	Mrinal Sen	Aamaar Bhuban
2002	Rituparno Ghosh	Utsav
2001	Buddhadeb Dasgupta	Uttara
2000	Rituparno Ghosh
1999	Rituparno Ghosh
1998
1997	Rituparno Ghosh	Unishey April
1996	Buddhadeb Dasgupta	Charachar
1995	Tapan Sinha	Wheel Chair
1994
1993	Satyajit Ray	Agantuk
1992	Mrinal Sen	Mahaprithbi
1991
1990
1989	Buddhadeb Dasgupta	Phera
1988	Rajen Tarafdar	Nagpash
1987	Saroj De	Kony
1986	Aparna Sen	Paroma
1985
1984
1983
1982
1981
1980
1979
1978
1977
1976	Tarun Majumder	Sansar Simanthey
1975 Asit Bandopadhyay (actor) Mrinal Sen (director) || Chorus
1974	Mrinal Sen	Padatik
1973	Mrinal Sen	Calcutta 71’
1972	Tarun Majumder	Nimantran
1971	Satyajit Ray	Pratidwandi
1970	Satyajit Ray	Goopy Gyne Bagha Byne
1969	Tapan Sinha	Apanjan
1968	Arundhati Devi	Chhuti
1967	Satyajit Ray	Nayak
1966	Ritwik Ghatak	Subarna Rekha
1965	Satyajit Ray	Charulata
1964	Tapan Sinha	Nirjan Saikate
1963	Satyajit Ray	Abhijan
1962	Satyajit Ray	Tin Kanya
1961
1960
1959
1958
1957
1956
1955
1954
1953
1952
1951
1950
1949
1948
1947
1946	Niren Lahiri	Bhabikal
1945	Bimal Roy	Udayer Pathey
1944
1943	1.Shailajanand Mukherjee	Bondi
1943	2.Niren Lahiri	Garmil
1942	Hemchunder	Pratishruti

== See also ==
- Bengal Film Journalists' Association Awards
- Cinema of India
