= Mamata Shankar =

Indian actress and dancer (born 1955)

- মমতা শঙ্কর
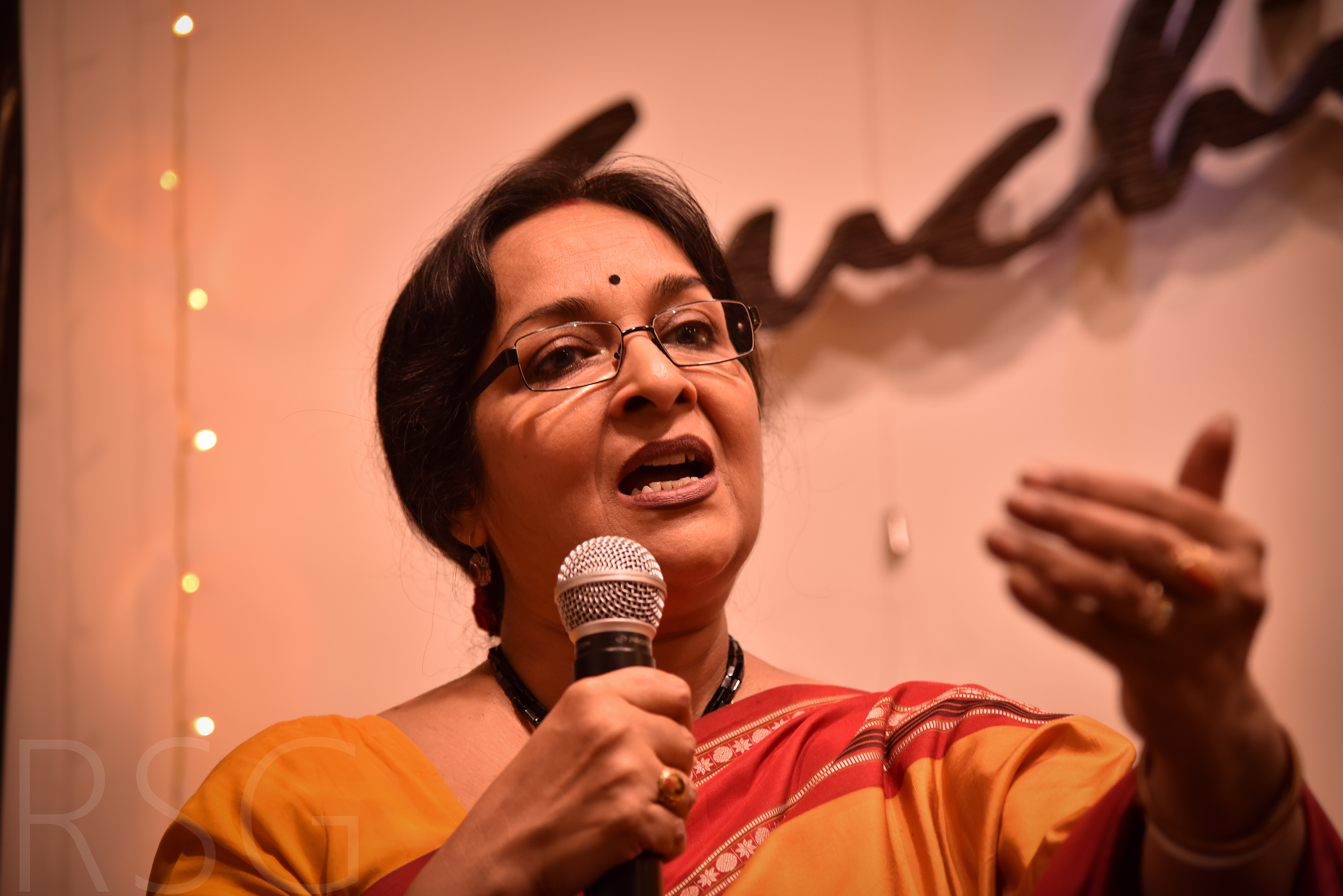
- Shankar in 2014
- Born: 7 January 1955 (age 71); Calcutta, West Bengal, India
- Occupations: Dancer; choreographer; actress
- Spouse: Chandrodoy Ghosh
- Children: Ratul Shankar; Rajit Shankar Ghosh
- Parent(s): Uday Shankar (father); Amala Shankar (mother)
- Relatives: Ananda Shankar (brother)

Mamata Shankar (born 7 January 1955) is an Indian actress and dancer. She is known for her work in Bengali cinema. She has acted in films by directors including Satyajit Ray, Mrinal Sen, Rituparno Ghosh, Buddhadeb Dasgupta and Gautam Ghosh. In addition to being an actress, she is a dancer and choreographer. She was the niece of musician Pandit Ravi Shankar. Her brother, Ananda Shankar, was an Indo-Western fusion musician.

In January 2025, Mamata Shankar was honored with the Padma Shri, India's fourth-highest civilian award, by the Government of India. She has received a National Film Award and four Filmfare Awards Bangla.

== Early life and education ==
Mamata Shankar was born on 7 January 1955 to the dancers Uday Shankar and Amala Shankar. She received her training in dance and choreography at the Uday Shankar India Culture Centre, Calcutta under Amala Shankar.

== Career ==
Shankar made her film debut with Mrigayaa in 1976, directed by Mrinal Sen. The film won the National Film Award for Best Feature Film for the year.

Shankar is married, and runs the Udayan - Mamta Shankar Dance Company, which was founded in 1986, and which travels extensively throughout the world, with the 'Mamata Shankar Ballet Troupe'. The troupe was founded in 1978, and performed its first production, based on a Rabindranath Tagore work, Chandalika, in 1979. It was followed by Horikhela, Aajker Ekalabya, Milap, Shikaar, Mother Earth, Amritasyaputra and Sabari.

== Awards ==
- 1992: National Film Award – Special Jury Award (Feature Film) for Agantuk
- 1993: BFJA Award – Best Supporting Actress Award for Shakha Proshakha
- 2000: BFJA Award – Best Supporting Actress Award for Utsab
- 2018: Filmfare Awards Bangla 2018 – Best Supporting Actress for Maacher Jhol
- 2023: Filmfare Awards Bangla 2023 – Best Supporting Actress for Projapoti
- 2025: Padma Shri
- 2025: Filmfare Awards Bangla 2025 – Best Actress (Critics') for Bijoyar Pore

== Filmography ==
- Mrigayaa (The Royal Hunt, 1976)
- Oka Oori Katha (The Marginal Ones or The Outsiders, 1977)
- Dooratwa aka Distance (1978)
- Ek Din Pratidin (And Quiet Rolls the Dawn or One Day Like Another (USA), 1979)
- Bapika Bidai (1980)
- Kalankini (1981)
- Kharij (The Case Is Closed, 1982)
- Grihajuddha (Crossroads, 1982)
- Dakhal (The Occupation, 1982)
- Grihajuddha (Crossroads, 1982)
- Nishantay (1985)
- Neelkantho (1985)
- Shakha Proshakha (The Branches of the Tree or Les Branches de L'arbre, 1991)
- Agantuk (The Stranger aka Le Visiteur, 1991)
- Sunya Theke Suru (A Return to Zero, 1993)
- Prajapati (1993)
- Sopan (1994)
- Daughters of This Century (1995)
- Dahan (Crossfire, 1997)
- Nayantara (1997)
- Utsab (The Festival, 2000)
- Waaris (2004)
- The Bong Connection (2006)
- Samudra Sakshi (2006)
- Ballyganj Court (2007)
- Drishti Pradip (2008)
- Abohomaan (The Eternal, 2010)
- Jaani Dyakha Hawbe (2011)
- Ranjana Ami Ar Ashbona (2011)
- Jaatishwar (2014)
- Agantuker Pore (2015)
- Pink (2016)
- Maacher Jhol (2017)
- Flat No 609 (2018)
- Shah Jahan Regency (2019)
- Shesher Golpo (2019)
- Antardhaan (2021)
- Bhotbhoti (2022)
- Antarleen
- Flat No. 609
- Projapoti (2022)
- Shibpur (2023)
- Palaan (2023)
- Pradhan (2023)
- Bijoyar Pore (2024)
- Deri Hoye Geche (2025)
- Projapoti 2 (2025)
