= Rabiranjan Maitra =

Indian film director and editor (born 1963)

- Born: 1963 (age 62–63); Kolkata, West Bengal, India
- Occupations: Actor; editor
- Years active: 1987–present
- Spouse: Subrata Maitra
- Children: 1

Rabiranjan Maitra is an Indian film director and editor who predominantly works in Bengali cinema. His most notable works include Tobu Mone Rekho (1994), Mr. and Mrs. Iyer (2002), Raatporir Rupkatha (2007), Rok Sako To Rok Lo (2007), Challenge (2009), Chalo Paltai (2011), Chander Pahar (film) (2013), Meghe Dhaka Tara (2013), Jole Jongole (2016), and Amazon Obhijaan (2017). His 2018 ventures include action thriller Kabir starring Rukmini Maitra and Shankar Mudi featuring Kaushik Ganguly, Anjan Dutt, and Sreela Majumder.

== Career ==
Maitra is noted for his work in Bengali cinema. He started his career with the TV movie Tero Sandhyar Galpo in 1990. After that, he got into the world of television. In his career, he has worked in more than 315 feature films. He has worked as a director, an actor, an editor, a sound designer and a producer in many films.

== Filmography ==
Year	Film	Role	Notes
2018	Pornomochi		
2017	Cockpit	Manager	
2017	Porobashinee		Reggae Entertainment & Tourism Ltd
2015	13 No Tarachand Lane	Doctor	
2011	Shotru	Police Commissioner	
2010	Jodi Ekdin	AR	
2004	Chased by Dreams	Policeman	
2003	Nil Nirjane	Film director	
2002	Mr. and Mrs. Iyer	Dr. Chatterjee	
1998	Dahan	Gang leader	

== Editor ==
Year	Film	Director
2023	The Rapist	Aparna Sen
2023	The Eken: Ruddhaswas Rajasthan	Joydip Mukherjee
2022	The Eken	Joydip Mukherjee
2021	Anusandhan	Kamaleshwar Mukherjee
2021	Flyover	Abhimanyu Mukherjee
2019	Ghawre Bairey Aaj	Aparna Sen
2019	Password	Kamaleshwar Mukherjee
2018	Kabir	Aniket Chattopadhyay
2018	Pornomochi	Koushik Kar
2018	Alifa	Deep Choudhury
2018	Jole Jongole	Nitish Roy
2017	Amazon Obhijaan	Kamaleshwar Mukherjee
2017	Cockpit	Kamaleshwar Mukherjee
2017	Porobashinee	Swapan Ahmed
2017	Sonata	Aparna Sen
2016	Khawto	Kamaleshwar Mukherjee
2016	Udaan	Ritajit Raychaudhuri
2015	Arshinagar	Aparna Sen
2015	Ryan & I	Sambit Banerjee
2015	Katmundu	Raj Chakraborty
2015	13 No Tarachand Lane	Kamaleshwar Mukherjee
2014	Yoddha: The Warrior	Raj Chakraborty
2014	Chotushkone	Srijit Mukherjee
2014	Borbaad	Raj Chakraborty
2014	Bindaas	Rajiv Kumar Biswas
2014	Arundhati	Sujit Mondal
2014	Chirodini Tumi Je Amar 2	Soumik Chatterjee
2014	Highway	Sudipto Chattopadhyay
2013	Chander Pahar	Kamaleshwar Mukherjee
2013	Goynar Baksho	Aparna Sen
2013	Punglingo Strilingo	Subrata Sen
2013	Rangbaaz	Raja Chanda
2008	Swapner Din	Buddhadeb Dasgupta
2007	Eklavya: The Royal Guard	Vidhu Vinod Chopra
2006	Faltu	Anjan Das
2006	Anuranan	Aniruddha Roy Chowdhury
2005	15 Park Avenue	Aparna Sen
2002	Mr. and Mrs. Iyer	Aparna Sen
2002	Mondo Meyer Upakhyan	Buddhadeb Dasgupta
2001	Uttara	Buddhadeb Dasgupta
