= Venu (cinematographer) =

Indian cinematographer and film director

- Born: Venugopal Pillai; 26 January 1957 (age 69)
- Education: FTII
- Occupations: Cinematographer; Film director
- Spouse: Beena Paul (m. 1983)
- Children: Malavika
- Relatives: Karur Neelakanta Pillai (Grandfather)

Venugopal Pillai ISC (born 26 January 1957), popularly known as Venu, is an Indian cinematographer and film director who works mainly in Malayalam cinema. An alumnus of the Film and Television Institute of India, Pune and CMS college Kottayam. Regarded as one of the finest cinematographers in the country, he has been the recipient of four National Film Awards, including three for Best Cinematography and one Indira Gandhi Award for Best Debut Film of a Director, and four Kerala State Film Awards. He is a founding member of the Indian Society of Cinematographers (ISC).

== Personal life ==
Venu is the grandson of Malayalam author, Karur Neelakanta Pillai. Venu is married to Indian film editor, Beena Paul, since 26 August 1983. The couple have a daughter, Malavika, who is married and is the manager of the Great North Museum: Hancock.

== Career ==
Venu graduated from the Film and Television Institute of India, Pune, with a diploma in motion picture photography in 1982. He has worked as cinematographer in over 80 feature films with Mani Kaul, K G George, John Abraham, Buddhadeb Dasgupta, Pamela Rooks, Padmarajan, Bharathan and M. T. Vasudevan Nair.

In 1987, Venu received his first National Film Award (jointly for Amma Ariyan and Namukku Parkkan Munthiri Thoppukal). He went onto receive two more awards for Miss Beatty's Children (1993) and Ponthan Mada (1994). In 1998, he made his directorial debut with Daya, a period fiction written by M. T. Vasudevan Nair. The film won the Kerala State Film Award for Best Debut Director and Indira Gandhi Award for Best Debut Film of a Director. In 2014, he directed his second film, Munnariyippu, starring Mammootty. His latest work is Carbon, starring Fahadh Faasil.

He has also written two books named Nagnarum Narabhojikalum (or നഗ്നരും നരഭോജികളും): A travelogue and Solo Stories (or സോളോ സ്റ്റോറീസ്): A collection of travel writings featuring photographs from various parts of India.

== Filmography ==
=== As cinematographer ===
| Year | Film | Language | Notes |
|---|---|---|---|
| 1983 | Prem Nazirine Kanmanilla | Malayalam | |
| 1984 | Mati Manas | Hindi | Documentary |
| 1985 | Irakal | Malayalam | |
| 1986 | Sister Alphonsa of Bharananganam | Malayalam | |
| 1986 | Deshadanakkili Karayaariilla | Malayalam | |
| 1986 | Kariyilakkaattu Pole | Malayalam | |
| 1986 | Arappatta Kettiya Graamatthil | Malayalam | |
| 1986 | Pranamam | Malayalam | |
| 1986 | Namukku Paarkkaan Munthiri Thoppukal | Malayalam | |
| 1986 | Amma Ariyaan | Malayalam | |
| 1987 | Kathakku Pinnil | Malayalam | |
| 1988 | Aparan | Malayalam | |
| 1988 | Moonaam Pakkam | Malayalam | |
| 1988 | Aaranyakam | Malayalam | |
| 1988 | Dhwani | Malayalam | |
| 1989 | Bagh Bahadur | Bengali | |
| 1989 | Season | Malayalam | |
| 1989 | Vadakkunnokkiyanthram | Malayalam | |
| 1989 | Ramji Rao Speaking | Malayalam | |
| 1989 | Dasharatham | Malayalam | |
| 1990 | Innale | Malayalam | |
| 1990 | Thaazhvaaram | Malayalam | |
| 1990 | In Harihar Nagar | Malayalam | |
| 1990 | Malootty | Malayalam | |
| 1991 | Gunaa | Tamil | |
| 1991 | Godfather | Malayalam | |
| 1991 | Kadavu | Malayalam | |
| 1991 | Njaan Gandharvan | Malayalam | |
| 1991 | Keli | Malayalam | |
| 1992 | Miss Beatty's Children | English | |
| 1992 | Tahader Katha | Bengali | |
| 1992 | Aham | Malayalam | |
| 1992 | Vietnam Colony | Malayalam | |
| 1992 | Nakshathrakkoodaaram | Malayalam | |
| 1993 | Maayaa Mayooram | Malayalam | |
| 1993 | Oru Kadankadha Pole | Malayalam | |
| 1993 | Chenkol | Malayalam | |
| 1993 | Manichithratthaazhu | Malayalam | |
| 1993 | Porutham | Malayalam | |
| 1994 | Sagaram Sakshi | Malayalam | |
| 1994 | Ponthan Mada | Malayalam | |
| 1994 | Amodini | Bengali | |
| 1994 | Tarpan | Hindi | |
| 1995 | Sindoora Rekha | Malayalam | |
| 1995 | Thacholi Varghese Chekavar | Malayalam | |
| 1995 | Sadaram | Malayalam | |
| 1996 | Kaanaakkinaavu | Malayalam | |
| 1997 | Minsara Kanavu | Tamil | |
| 1997 | Bhoothakkannadi | Malayalam | |
| 1997 | Lal Darja | Bengali | |
| 1999 | Angane Oru Avadhikkaalathu | Malayalam | |
| 1999 | Chandaamaama | Malayalam | |
| 1999 | Friends | Malayalam | |
| 2002 | Mondo Meyer Upakhyan | Bengali | |
| 2002 | Matrubhoomi: A Nation Without Women | Hindi | |
| 2002 | Taj Mahal: A Monument of Love | English | |
| 2002 | Margam | Malayalam | |
| 2004 | Swapner Din | Bengali | |
| 2005 | Nuvvostanante Nenoddantana | Telugu | Debut in Telugu cinema |
| 2005 | Anbe Aaruyire | Tamil | |
| 2005 | Jai Chiranjeeva | Telugu | |
| 2006 | Pournami | Telugu | |
| 2007 | Thirumagan | Tamil | |
| 2008 | Maharathi | Hindi | |
| 2008 | 2 Harihar Nagar | Malayalam | |
| 2008 | Bhaagyadevatha | Malayalam | |
| 2008 | Kerala Varma Pazhassi Raja | Malayalam | |
| 2010 | Kadha Thudarunnu | Malayalam | |
| 2010 | Pranchiyettan & the Saint | Malayalam | |
| 2010 | Tournament | Malayalam | |
| 2010 | In Ghost House Inn | Malayalam | |
| 2011 | Three Kings | Malayalam | |
| 2011 | Snehaveedu | Malayalam | |
| 2012 | Cobra | Malayalam | |
| 2012 | Spirit | Malayalam | |
| 2012 | Puthiya Theerangal | Malayalam | |
| 2013 | Celluloid | Malayalam | |
| 2014 | Munnariyippu | Malayalam | |
| 2021 | Aanum Pennum | Malayalam | |
| 2023 | Pulimada | Malayalam | |
| 2024 | Pani | Malayalam | |

=== As director ===
- Daya (1998)
- Munnariyippu (2014)
- Carbon (2018)
- Aanum Pennum (2021)

== Awards ==
National Film Awards

| Year | Film | Language | Category | Notes |
|---|---|---|---|---|
| 1986 | Amma Ariyan; Namukku Parkkan Munthirithoppukal | Malayalam | National Film Award for Best Cinematography | |
| 1992 | Miss Beatty's Children | English | National Film Award for Best Cinematography | |
| 1993 | Ponthan Mada | Malayalam | National Film Award for Best Cinematography | |

Kerala State Film Awards

- 1985 - Irakal - Best Cinematography
- 1992 – Aham – Best Cinematography
- 2003 - Margam - Best Cinematography
