= Lal Darja =

- Directed by: Buddhadev Dasgupta
- Written by: Buddhadev Dasgupta
- Produced by: Bhappi Lahiri; Chitrani Lahiri; Dulal Roy
- Starring: Subhendu Chatterjee; Gulsan Ara Akhtar; Raisul Islam; Indrani Haldar; Biplab Chatterjee; Haradhan Bandopadhyay
- Cinematography: Venu
- Edited by: Ujjal Nandi
- Music by: Bappi Lahiri
- Release date: 1997
- Running time: 97 minutes
- Country: India
- Language: Bengali

Lal Darja (English language: The Red Door) is a 1997 Bengali allegorical drama film about a Kolkata dentist Dr. Nabin Dutta who fears becoming a cripple. Directed and written by Buddhadev Dasgupta, the film won the Golden Lotus Award for Best Film at the Indian National Film Awards.

== Plot ==
Nabin Dutta (Subhendu Chattopadhyay) was a 47-year-old dentist. He had a son, Kushal who was studying in Darjeeling. His wife was not satisfied with him and wanted a separation. Nabin thought he had some acute disease, but it was nothing serious. Every moment, Nabin felt a lack of satisfaction.

He compared his situation with his driver Dinu who had two wives, Sukhi (Nandini Maliya) and Maloti (Indrani Haldar). Dinu's wives were satisfied with him and they had no complaints about him. Nabin tried to understand himself. Most of the time he thought about his childhood in Cherrapunji and the red coloured gate which he thought obeyed him. His mother said that the gate had a huge tolerance and Nabin compared himself with the red coloured gate. Ultimately, after departing from his wife and son, he raised his tolerance to a maximum stage and started to live alone.

== Cast ==
- Champa
- Subhendu Chatterjee as Nabin Dutta
- Raisul Islam
- Indrani Haldar as Maloti
- Biplab Chatterjee
- Haradhan Bandopadhyay
