= Samayer Kache =

- Directed by: Buddhadeb Dasgupta
- Written by: Buddhadeb Dasgupta
- Release date: 1968
- Country: India
- Language: Bengali

Samayer Kache is a 1968 Bengali short film directed and written by Buddhadeb Dasgupta.
