= Prafulla Roy =

Indian writer (1934–2025)

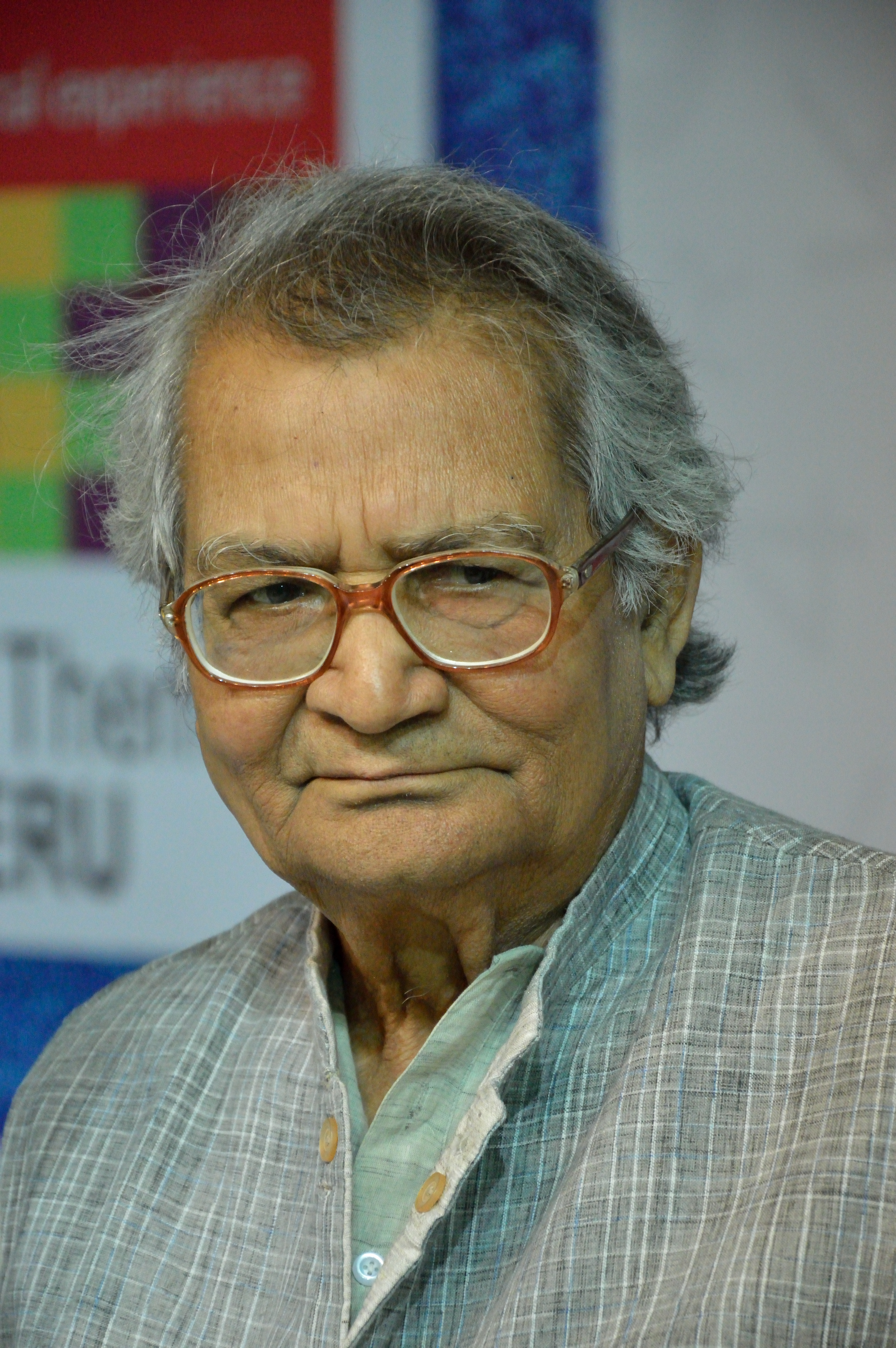
- Born: 11 September 1934; Atpara, Bikrampur District, Bengal Presidency, British India
- Died: 19 June 2025 (aged 90); Kolkata, West Bengal, India
- Occupation: Writer
- Writing career
- Language: Bengali
- Notable work: Keya Patar Nouko

Prafulla Roy (11 September 1934 – 19 June 2025) was an Indian Bengali author, who lived in West Bengal. He received Bankim Puraskar and Sahitya Akademi Award for his literary contribution in Bengali.

== Early life ==
Prafulla Roy was born on 11 September 1934 in the village of Atpara, Bikrampur, in the former East Bengal, district of Dhaka. He moved to India in 1950 and resided in Kolkata. He had to struggle a lot to set foot in a new land. He travelled all over the country to experience the struggles of the people. And for this purpose he lived for some time among the indigenous people of Nagaland, who were the untouchables of Bihar and the rootless people of the mainland of the Andamans, most of which later appeared flawlessly in his writings.

== Author ==
Roy's writings portray powerful realities in both urban and rural conditions. He wrote over 150 books, including novels and short stories. His first novel was Purva Parvati, written in Nagaland and published in 1956. He penned novels on refugee life, such as Keya Patar Nauko (2003), Shatdharay Boye Yay (2006), Uttal Samayer Itikatha (2014), Nona Jal Mithe Mati (Bang 136). Although it differs in form and name from Kayapatar Nauka, Shatdharaya Boye Yaya, Uttal Samay Itikatha, it is actually a trilogy.

From 1986 to 1989, at the initiative of Monindra Roy, Keya Patar Nauko was continuously published in Amrit Patrika.

== Adaptations ==
About 45 telefilms, tele-series, and number of feature-films were made based on his novels. Among his notable works are Ekhane Pinjar (1971), Bagh Bondi Khela (1975), Mohana Dike (1984), Aadmi Aur Aurat (1984), Ekanta Apan (1987), Bagh Bahadur Pratipaksha (1988) (1989), Prithibir Sesh Station (1993), Charachar (1994), Target (1996), Mondo Meyer Upakhyan (2003), Desh (2002), Krantikaal (2005), Pitribhumi (2007).

India produced a serial drama of the same name based on his novel Keya Patar Nouko, which aired on Indian Channel Zee Bangla.

== Death ==
Roy died on 19 June 2025, at the age of 90 in Kolkata.

== Awards ==
- Bankim Puraskar for his novel Akasher Neeche Manush (1985)
- Sahitya Akademi Award for his novel Krantikal (2003)
- Bhualka Puraskar
- Matilal Puraskar

== See also ==
- Bankim Puraskar
- List of Sahitya Akademi Award winners for Bengali
