= Swapner Din =

- Original Poster
- Directed by: Buddhadev Dasgupta
- Written by: Buddhadev Dasgupta
- Produced by: Jhamu Sughand
- Starring: Prasenjit Chatterjee; Rimi Sen; Rajesh Sharma; Raima Sen
- Cinematography: Venu
- Edited by: Rabiranjan Maitra
- Music by: Biswadep Dasgupta
- Release dates: 16 September 2004 (Toronto Film Festival); 2 October 2008 (India)
- Running time: 89 minutes
- Country: India
- Language: Bengali

Swapner Din (English: Chased by Dreams, translation: A Day of Dreams) is a 2004 Bengali drama film directed and written by Buddhadev Dasgupta, who won the National Film Award for Best Direction for it.

== Plot ==
Paresh, the protagonist in Swapner Din, cannot afford the luxury of reaching out for the unexplored. For him, travelling in an official jeep across the state is a matter of keeping alive, a business he is forced to do. He screens badly put together family planning films in villages that fall along his predetermined route, often meeting with unpleasant responses from his target audience. His faith in life is sustained by his love for his dream girl — a beautiful actress he saw crying away in a film five years ago and has been haunted by. He has never met her. She accompanies him on his daily sojourns through a sticker of her picture pasted on the projector box he carries along.

Chapal, the proxy-driver Paresh is saddled with, carries a stolen passport that has his picture under a different name. His dream is to reach Dubai and land a cushy job to end what he thinks is an apology for living. The pregnant and pretty Ameena is running back to her homeland Bangladesh. Her husband, an illegal immigrant, was killed in the Gujarat riots. Her dream is to give birth to her child in her own country, as a legal citizen rooted to his land.

Along the journey, the three share their food, their sleep and their dreams trying to help each other get that much closer to the fulfillment of their respective dreams. No one falls in love, no one attempts to molest Ameena, not even the goons who take away the jeep at gun-point and leave them in the wilderness of nowhere, and no one comes to their rescue when their lives, along with their dreams, are threatened by the real danger of death.

== Cast ==
- Prasenjit Chatterjee as Paresh
- Rimi Sen as Ameena
- Rajesh Sharma as Chapal
- Raima Sen

== Awards ==
2005 National Film Awards for Best Direction
