= Grihajuddha =

- Directed by: Buddhadev Dasgupta
- Written by: Buddhadev Dasgupta, Prabrit Das Mahapatra (screenplay)
- Produced by: Buddhadev Dasgupta
- Cinematography: Sambit Bose
- Release date: 1982
- Running time: 98 minutes
- Country: India
- Language: Bengali

Grihajuddha (English language:Crossroads) is a 1982 Bengali film directed and written by Buddhadev Dasgupta and starring Sunil Mukherjee. The film was produced under contract from the Government of West Bengal. The Naxalite movement in Bengal in the 1970s forms a backdrop to the film.

The film was entered into the main competition at the 39th edition of the Venice Film Festival.

== Plot ==
The Chief labour officer of a private steel company in Barrackpur senses corruption in the management. Being an ideal person, he resigned but gets murdered. The secretary of the trade union, Probir gets to know of it and is also murdered. His comrade Bijan manages to escape and absconds. Nirupama, the sister, who silently cherishes Bijan, along with Sandipan, a reporter, tracks down the hired gang of killers, which includes Sital, the goal keeper in a smalltime football team. Sital reveals that they had been lured with the promise of a job. But the promises were not kept and Sital wishes to disown his past. Meanwhile, Bijan has made good as a salesman in Nasik and returns to Calcutta as a changed man. His values had been eroded by time and success. He tries to justify his desertion of his earlier convictions, but fails to convince Nirupama. He wants a settled married life with Nirupama. She still clings to the ideals of her dead brother. But confusion and desperation forces Nirupama to accept his proposal. On the date of marriage, Sandipan is found dead in mysterious circumstances. Confused, Nirupama wants to postpone the marriage. Quarrels follow and Nirupama realises that the void between them is too wide to be bridged. The rift, however, forces a helpless girl to the threshold of self awareness. The film ends with Nirupama beginning the struggle all by herself.

== Cast ==
- Anjan Dutt as Bijon
- Mamata Shankar as Nirupama
- Goutam Ghose as Sandipan
- Shashanka Bhattacharya
- Manoj Mitra as Newspaper Editor
- Prabir Guha
- Sunil Mukherjee
- Pradip Sen
- Monidipa Roy

== Production ==
=== Casting ===
In 1981, Gautam Ghose had done a film with Mamata Shankar called Dakhal. Gautam Ghose said “ While directing Mamata, I would enact some scenes. She called up Buddha and praised my acting skills. In fact, she also to him that he should approach me for the role in ‘Grihajuddha’." Buddha and Mamata reached his residence to convince him to play the part.

=== Production ===
Gautam Ghose said about Buddhadeb Dasgupta in an interview " He would always tell the unit that I don't need extra takes since I am myself a cinematographer and know how to walk keeping pace with the trolley. Buddha was trying to develop a new style since the days of ‘Grihajuddha’. We would often get into arguments over why he was doing things a certain way. He would then tell me about wanting to develop a new style. Since I am also a film-maker, I could understand that."

== Trivia ==
1. One of the thugs Shital Das that visited the deceased Prabir Dutta's house was shown to be the goalkeeper of Friends Sporting Club, Kolkata.
