= Dholer Raja Khirode Natta =

- Directed by: Buddhadev Dasgupta
- Written by: Buddhadev Dasgupta
- Release date: 1973
- Country: India
- Language: Bengali

Dholer Raja Khirode Natta is a 1973 Bengali documentary film directed and written by Buddhadev Dasgupta.
