= Alokananda Roy =

Indian actress

- Years active: 1957 – 1962; 1978 – present
- Awards: BFJA Awards

Alokananda Roy is an Indian actress known for her work in Bengali cinema and theatre. She made her thespian debut at the age of seven in the 1951 and later on became part of numerous Bengali plays. She made her screen debut with Satyajit Ray's Kanchenjungha (1962). She received a BFJA Award for her role in Buddhadeb Dasgupta's Bengali film Phera (1988). She appeared in National Award winning films such as Paromitar Ek Din, Utsab, Prohor and Netaji Subhas Chandra Bose: The Forgotten Hero.

== Acting career ==
While searching for a new face to portray the character of Manisha in Kanchenjungha (1962), Satyajit Ray ultimately chose Alokananda Roy for the role. Ray had to convince her father and her uncle as well that the role was sober enough to play. The film did not perform well at the box office.

In 1978, She returned to stage with the Bengali play Acharya directed by Shekhar Chatterjee. She featured opposite Soumitra Chatterjee for near about ten years, in the Bengali play Homapakhi directed by the latter. She starred as Rangapishima in Rituparno Ghosh's Bengali thriller TV series Tahar Namti Ranjana. Due to the sudden demise of Ghosh, the series was never carried on after completion of the first episode.

== Awards ==
Award	Year	Category	Film	Result	Ref.
BFJA Award	1989	Best Actress in a Leading Role	Phera	Won	
Anandalok Puraskar	1998	Best Actress in a Supporting Role	Sedin Chaitramas	Won	
Filmfare Award Bangla	2022	Best Actress in a Supporting Role	Ekannoborty	Nominated	

== Filmography ==
=== Hindi film ===
Year	Film	Role	Notes	Ref.
2004	Netaji Subhas Chandra Bose: The Forgotten Hero	Prabhabati Devi		

=== Bengali film ===
†	Denotes films that have not yet been released

Year	Title	Role	Notes	Ref.
1962	Kanchenjungha	Manisha	directed by Satyajit Ray	
1988	Phera		directed by Buddhadeb Dasgupta	
1992	City of Joy	Mother of child in opening scene	directed by Roland Joffé	
1997	Sedin Chaitramas			
2000	Paromitar Ek Din		directed by Aparna Sen	
2000	Utsab		directed by Rituparno Ghosh	
2004	Prohor			
2006	Kranti			
2007	Jara Bristite Bhijechhilo			
2015	Family Album			
2016	Benche Thakar Gaan			
2016	Cinemawala		directed by Kaushik Ganguly	
2021	Ekannoborti		directed by Mainak Bhaumik	
2025	Dhumketu		directed by Kaushik Ganguly	

=== Bengali TV series ===
Year	Title	Channel	Role
1999	Ek Akasher Niche	Zee Bangla	Nandini's mother.
2008	Khela	Zee Bangla	Tista's mother.
2010	Ganer Opare	Star Jalsha	Sucharita Sanyal.
2013	Badhubaran	Star Jalsha	Rangama.
2013	Raage Anuraage	Zee Bangla	Mallar's mother.
2016	Membou	Star Jalsha	Gora's paternal grandmother.
2017	Jamai Raja	Zee Bangla	Nilasha's maternal grandmother
2019	Guriya Jekhane Guddu Sekhane	Star Jalsha	
2019	Sreemoyee	Star Jalsha	Sreemoyee's Mother.
2021	Amader Ei Poth Jodi Na Shesh Hoy	Zee Bangla	Rama Sarkar:Satyaki's Grandmother
