= Utsab =

- DVD cover of the film.
- Directed by: Rituparno Ghosh
- Written by: Rituparno Ghosh
- Produced by: Sutapa Ghosh; Tapan Biswas
- Starring: Madhabi Mukherjee; Mamata Shankar; Prasenjit Chatterjee; Rituparna Sengupta; Pradip Mukherjee; Deepankar De; Arpita Pal
- Cinematography: Abhik Mukhopadhyay
- Edited by: Arghyakamal Mitra
- Music by: Debojyoti Mishra
- Distributed by: Cinemawalla
- Release date: 23 March 2000
- Running time: 119 minutes
- Language: Bengali

Utsab, also written Utsav (Bengali: উৎসব, [ut̪.ʃɔb] lit. 'Festival') is a 2000 Bengali-language drama film directed by Rituparno Ghosh and stars Madhabi Mukherjee, Mamata Shankar, Rituparna Sengupta, Prasenjit Chatterjee, Pradip Mukherjee, Deepankar De and Arpita Pal. The film focuses on the various emotional currents passing among family and relatives underneath the supposedly festive occasion of Durga Puja.

== Plot ==
This is a family drama which is portrayed against the backdrop of Durga Puja, West Bengal's biggest festival. The story is about a cultured Bengali family, different members that have gathered in their native house on the occasion of Durga puja. Bhagabati has four children: two sons Asit and Nishith and two daughters Parul and Keya. It is festival time and all the children are at the main house to celebrate. Meanwhile, Shishir, a relative who is also a big real estate agent, is interested in buying the house. Most of the family members want to sell the house. The old and traditional house is not a place for everyone's interest and they have individual problems to solve with money. None of the sisters are looking forward to the family reunion as they all are more concerned about their own problems.

== Cast ==
- Madhabi Mukherjee as Bhagabati.
- Pradip Mukherjee as Asit, Bhagabati's elder son.
- Alokananda Roy as Bonani, Asit's wife.
- Arpita Pal as Shompa, Asit's daughter.
- Bodhisattva Mazumdar as Nishith, Bhagabati's younger son.
- Anuradha Roy (actress) as Monica, Nishith's wife.
- Vinit Ranjan Maitra as Bumba, Nishith's son.
- Mamata Shankar as Parul, Bhagabati's elder daughter.
- Ratul Shankar as Joy, Parul's son.
- Rituparna Sengupta as Keya, Bhagabati's younger daughter.
- Prosenjit Chatterjee as Arun, Keya's husband.
- Deepankar De as Shishir.

== Awards ==
National Film Awards (India)

- Won - Golden Lotus Award - Best Director - Rituparno Ghosh
