= Uttara (film) =

- Poster
- Directed by: Buddhadev Dasgupta
- Written by: Buddhadev Dasgupta; Samaresh Bose (story)
- Produced by: Buddhadev Dasgupta; Dulal Roy
- Starring: Jaya Seal; Tapas Paul; Shankar Chakraborty; Raisul Islam Asad
- Cinematography: Asim Bose
- Edited by: Raviranjan Maitra
- Music by: Biswadep Dasgupta
- Distributed by: Buddhadeb Dagupta Productions
- Release date: 1 December 2000
- Running time: 93 minutes
- Country: India
- Language: Bengali

Uttara (English: The Wrestlers, Bengali: উত্তরা) is a 2000 Bengali language drama film thriller directed by Bengali poet Buddhadev Dasgupta. Based on a short story by Samaresh Bose, it stars Jaya Seal as Uttara, Tapas Paul, Shankar Chakraborty, Raisul Islam Asad as a Christian missionary.

The film contrasts violence, human vices and lawlessness in a seemingly peaceful setting, in a quiet village in Purulia district in Bengal.

Uttara premiered at the Venice Film Festival on 30 August 2000 and was the winner of the festivals' Special Director award. It was screened at the Toronto International Film Festival in September 2000 and on 22 May it was shown in the US at the Los Angeles Asian Pacific Film Festival The film was released in France on 13 June 2001 and won the Audience Award at the Nantes festival. It opened the Pusan Film Festival in South Korea. Buddhadeb Dasgupta won the National Film Award for Best Direction in 2000 for this movie.

Due to its homoerotic undertones, Uttara was shown at a number of gay and lesbian film festivals including the London Lesbian and Gay Film Festival.

== Overview of the film ==
The way the movie depicts the development of the plot conveys this violation of a peaceful world. The series of disjunctive shots of the threads of the story that follow the opening utopian shot disrupt any notions of linearity, making the audience feel the conflict of the forces that destroys the village. One of these scenes shows an army of dwarfs traversing mountains, plains, and rivers, suggesting the search for an alternative world. As the dwarf who tries to help Uttara explains, these people have grown weary of the world of 'tall people', which full of cruelty and despair, and seek an alternate world. This is a metaphor for the wider world plagued by inequality and corruption. The troupe of masked folk dancers, who meander through the village, function in a mythic framework, representing the continuity of culture and tradition, and act as a stabilizing force in the various conflicts that mar the idyllic world of the village.

The schism between the friends is illustrated in the wrestling, which gradually becomes an overpowering obsession. Instead of expressing bonding, it takes on the colour of a power-game between two equally physically strong and morally weak men. The wrestling irrespective of homoerotic undertones is a deliberate destruction where one aims to destroy the other, as each morally unjust man attempts to win the physical 'possession' of Uttara.

Although an allegorical, cautionary tale on religious fundamentalism, between Christianity and Hinduism, Uttara is also an incisive examination of the provincialism, anachronism, moral and social injustice, and inherent contradiction. Contradiction is very important element in the film, for example the Christian missionary Padre who dispenses of his food wastefully at a rural village ravaged by poverty in exchange for converting desperate (and undernourished) souls, and a band of Hindu zealots aggressively roaming the landscape in their off-road utility vehicle and behaving in a manner completely with disregard to others contrary to the Hindu faith.

Another important aspect of the film is the way in which the dwarfs don pagan masks and ritualistically perform an ancient parade through the village. The seemingly pantheistic ancient dance is intended to represent an instinctual connection to roots and tradition becoming a metaphor for the sense of duty that has become increasingly sublimated in an environment of self-interest, vanity, gluttony and strong jealousy and competition. It is this contrasted, parallel image of reverence for the cycle of nature that renders Buddhadeb Dasgupta's vision of Indian society as a complex and tragic one, illustrating that society is overcome by hypocrisy. The barbaric behaviour of the city-dwellers is also intended to reflect the deviance of human nature in modern urban society, as it becomes plagued by declining moral values and terrorized by the inhumanity of extremism.

== Cinematography and audio ==
The film is shot strikingly with visual imagination of the rural pastoral landscapes, the solitary huts of the wrestlers and the isolated church, contrasted against the malignant presence of the three urban yobs and their brutality. Filmmaker Buddhadeb Dasgupta employs a unique strategy of shooting where he consistently shot periods of Uttara just after dawn and before sunset to emphasise the natural lighting on the landscape and to create atmosphere. In addition, this is precisely matched with reverse angle shots and unusually deep focus for framing and blocking. The cumulative result of such a technique adds to the formal unease, in a world where distinct natural beauty and deadly human menace coexist in equal measure. The cinematography, with the increasing or diminishing light of day is intended to directly coincide with the volatile changes in the ambience and mood of the film. The intense sunrise in one of the scenes as tension surmounts attempts to exude a feeling of heat, giving reflecting the burning emotions between the two wrestlers who are overcome by lust and jealousy.

The sounds that accompany these images play into this reiteration of theme on a more abstract level, ranging from the eerie silence that accompanies the menacing presence of the three goons, to the death knell that sounds as a rock rolls down while the wrestlers fight to kill each other. The audio occasionally uses a lot of rhythm and beats, for instance during the escapades of the three yobs, but this is sometimes juxtaposed by images and sounds of tranquility, the shots of the orchard accompanied by a soothing tune, and the troupe of dancers with their folk culture, that signify hope for the future.

== Cast ==
- Jaya Seal as Uttara
- Tapas Paul as Nemai
- Shankar Chakraborty as Balaram
- Raisul Islam Asad as Padre
- Tapas Adhikari as Railway Guard
- Saurav Das as Matthew
- Gautam Warshi as Militant
- Masood Akhtar as Militant
- Subrat Dutta as Militant
