= Bijoyar Pore =

2024 Indian Bengali film

- Directed by: Abhijit SriDas
- Written by: Abhijit SriDas
- Screenplay by: Abhijit SriDas
- Story by: Abhijit SriDas
- Produced by: Sujit Raha
- Starring: Mamata Shankar; Deepankar De; Swastika Mukherjee; Mir Afsar Ali
- Cinematography: Supriyo Dutta
- Edited by: Anirban Maity
- Music by: Ranajoy Bhattacharjee
- Production company: SR Jupiter Motion Pictures
- Release date: 12 January 2024
- Running time: 149 minutes
- Country: India
- Language: Bengali

Bijoyar Pore is a 2024 Indian Bengali psychological drama film directed by Abhijit SriDas and produced by Sujit Raha under the banner of SR Jupiter Motion Pictures. Set against the backdrop of Durga Puja, it explores family, tradition, and reconciliation through the lens of generational conflict.

== Plot ==
After the grandeur of Durga Puja ends, a family returns to its home, burdened by years of silence and unresolved emotional wounds. When an estranged daughter returns and a tragedy unfolds, they are forced to confront long-buried grief. At the center is Alokananda, a quietly resolute mother whose empathy becomes the thread binding the family’s pain and capacity for healing.

== Cast ==
- Mamata Shankar
- Deepankar De
- Swastika Mukherjee
- Mir Afsar Ali
- Tanika Basu
- Rwitobroto Mukherjee
- Padmanabha Dasgupta
- Bidipta Chakraborty
- Animesh Bhaduri
- Miska Halim
- Kheya Chaatopadhay

== Release ==
Bijoyar Pore was released theatrically in India on 12 January 2024.

== Reception ==
Bijoyar Pore received significant attention on the international film festival circuit. The film made history by becoming the first Indian Bengali film to be officially selected at the prestigious Osaka Asian Film Festival, marking a milestone for Bengali cinema on the global stage. Its inclusion at the festival reflects a growing recognition of regional Indian films and the expanding reach of Bengali storytelling and cinematic expression, highlighting the film’s cultural impact beyond its domestic release.

== Accolades ==
=== Awards ===
Year	Award	Ceremony	Category	Recipient	Ref.
2024	Third Eye Asian Film Festival	20th Third Eye Asian Film Festival	Best Actress Award	Mamata Shankar	
2024	Dhaka International Film Festival	22nd Dhaka International Film Festival	Best Audience Choice Film	Abhijit SriDas	
2024	Telangana Bengali Film Festival	Telangana Bengali Film Festival - Aayna 2024	Best Director	Abhijit SriDas	
2024	Telangana Bengali Film Festival	Telangana Bengali Film Festival - Aayna 2024	Best Actress	Mamata Shankar	
2024	Telangana Bengali Film Festival	Telangana Bengali Film Festival - Aayna 2024	Best Supporting Actor	Swastika Mukherjee	
2024	Telangana Bengali Film Festival	Telangana Bengali Film Festival - Aayna 2024	Best Editing	Anirban Maity	
2025	Filmfare Awards Bangla	8th Filmfare Awards Bangla	Best Actress (Critics)	Mamata Shankar	

=== Official selections ===
- Official Selection - 21st Osaka Asian Film Festival (First Indian Bengali film screened at the festival)
- Official Selection - 29th Kolkata International Film Festival (Bengali Panorama)
- Official Selection - 10th Jaffna International Cinema Festival
- Official Selection - Jagran Film Festival, Mumbai
- Official Selection - Indo Padma Bengali Film Festival, Delhi
- Official Selection - Bengali Film Festival Dallas
- Official Selection - Suchitra Sen International Bengali Film Festival
- Official Selection - South Assam Film Festival
- Official Selection - NABC 2024, Chicago
- Official Selection - F5 International Film Festival, Kolkata
- Official Selection - India International Film Festival of Boston
- Official Selection - Atlanta Indian Film Festival
