= Rajar Kirty =

2020 Bengali film

Rajar Kirty is a Bengali thriller drama film directed by Shankar Roy. The movie was released on 27 November 2020 under the banner of Kamala Film Production.

== Plot ==
Raja, a ten-year-old school boy lives with his parents in a blended family. He is computer addicted, and while surfing through the internet Raja enters into the dark web and knows that a terrorist attack will happen in Kolkata. He promptly informs to the police through mail but later when the investigation starts, he cannot find the website link, and causes problems for his family.

== cast ==
- Biplab Chatterjee as Ramesh Chandra Dutta
- Ananya Chatterjee
- Rajesh Sharma
- Abhishek Chatterjee
- Master Ankush as Raja
- Master Sayan
