= Pradip Mukherjee =

Indian actor and dramatist (1946–2022)

- Born: 11 August 1946; Calcutta, Bengal Presidency, British India
- Died: 29 August 2022 (aged 76); Kolkata, West Bengal, India
- Occupations: Actor, dramatist
- Years active: 1976–2022
- Children: 2

Pradip Mukherjee, also known as Pradip Mukhopadhyay (11 August 1946 – 29 August 2022), was an Indian actor and dramatist who primarily acted in Bengali movies. Although not famous for acting in mainstream movies, Pradip Mukherjee received critical acclaim for his acting in movies like Satyajit Ray's Jana Aranya, Buddhadeb Dasgupta's Dooratwa, and Rituparno Ghosh's Utsab.

== Early life ==
Mukherjee was born to middle-class parents Sammohan Mukhopadhyay and Bhakti Mukhopadhyay and grew up in the Chorbagan area of Shimla in Kolkata. He completed his high school education at Hare School in 1965 and graduated from City College, Kolkata, in 1970. He took up law and graduated from law school in 1973.

== Acting career ==
At college, Mukherjee took drama lessons and joined drama academies. He acted in several plays at Tapan Theater in Kolkata. After graduating from law school, he worked full-time as a lawyer and acted in plays at the weekends. In 1974, he met Satyajit Ray who, impressed with his performance while he performed for Nakshatra Theater Group, cast him in his last movie of the Calcutta trilogy, Jana Aranya. The film received critical acclaim and won several awards, including the Karlovy Vary Prize in 1976. He also earned the Filmfare Awards East for Best Actor in 1976.

Later in his career, he acted in critically acclaimed films like Dooratwa (1981) and Utsab (2001).

== Personal life ==
Mukherjee married in 1977 and had a son and a daughter. Besides acting, he worked full-time as a tax consultant in Lake Town in the Patipukur area of East Kolkata.

Mukherjee died at a hospital in Kolkata on 29 August 2022, aged 76, from complications of a lung infection.

== Filmography ==
- Jana Aranya (1976)
- Golap Bou (1978)
- Dour (1979)
- Dooratwa (1981)
- Durer Nadi (1982)
- Ashleelotar Daye (1983)
- Lalita (1984)
- Anweshan (1985)
- Chopper (1987)
- Madhuganjer Sumati (1988)
- Behula (1989)
- Sati (1990)
- Manabpremik Nimai (1991)
- Anandaniketan (1991)
- Purushottam (1992)
- Hirer Angti (1992)
- Shakha Proshakha (1992)
- Ami O Maa (1994)
- Baksho Rahashya (1996)
- Kalratri (1997)
- Dahan (1998)
- Chaka (2000)
- Utsab (2001)
- Mondo Meyer Upakhyan (2003)
- Sangram (2005)
- Faltu (2006)
- Bibar (2006)
- Eti (2008)
- Gorosthaney Sabdhan (2010)
- Ami Aadu (2011)
- Shatru (2011)
- Mayabazaar (2012)
- Jekhane Bhooter Bhoy (2012)
- Maach Mishti & More (2013)
- Swabhoomi (2013)
- Goynar Baksho (2013)
- Badshahi Angti (2014)
- Shajarur Kanta (2015)
- Kahaani 2: Durga Rani Singh (2016) as Benu Kaka
- The Parcel (2020)
- Torulatar Bhoot (2021)

== Bibliography ==
- Robinson, Andrew (1989). Satyajit Ray: The Inner Eye. I.B. Tauris. ISBN 1-86064-965-3.
