= Mondo Meyer Upakhyan =

- The French language film poster of the film
- Directed by: Buddhadev Dasgupta
- Written by: Buddhadev Dasgupta; Prafulla Roy (short story)
- Produced by: Arya Bhattacharjee
- Starring: Samata Das; Tapas Paul; Rituparna Sengupta; Sreelekha Mitra; Sudipta Chakraborty; June Malia
- Cinematography: Venu
- Release date: 2002
- Running time: 90 minutes
- Country: India
- Language: Bengali

Mondo Meyer Upakhyan (Bengali: মন্দ মেয়ের উপাখ্যান) is a 2002 Indian Bengali-language film directed and written by Buddhadev Dasgupta based on a short story of Prafulla Roy. The film was also released under the English title A Tale of A Naughty Girl and French title Chroniques Indiennes. The film stars Samata Das in the title role. It also stars Tapas Paul, Rituparna Sengupta, Sreelekha Mitra, Sudipta Chakraborty and June Malia. The film won National Film Award for Best Feature Film in 2003.

== Plot ==
The film revolves with the story of a girl, Lati (Samata Das), whose mother Rajani (Rituparna Sengupta) is a prostitute living and working in a brothel in rural India. Rajani plans to offer her daughter to an older man, a rich husband and protector to her daughter. Lati, however, wants to return to school and finish her studies. Unwilling to pay such a price for material success, she runs away to Calcutta. The discovery of this new world is described parallel to other stories of emancipation, such as that of three young prostitutes, of an aged couple going nowhere and man's landing on the Moon. In a surrealistic approach typical of the director, a clumsy cat and an intelligent donkey are also present in the film.

Ganesh (Tapas Paul) works full-time as a driver for wealthy Bengali-speaking, Natabar Paladhi (Ram Gopal Bajaj), who lives in a mansion with his wife, children and grandchildren, and runs 'Anjali Cinema' He has Ganesh use his vehicle as a private taxi cab. Amongst Ganesh's customers are a woman named Bakul (June Malia), who alights near a town of Gosaipara to take up prostitution with Jamunabai; an abandoned elderly couple who are in need of hospitalization — there is none in the vicinity, and they end up secretly riding with Ganesh all the time; while Natabar uses this vehicle to travel to Gosaipara to visit a prostitute named Rajani and negotiate with her so that he can have her 14-year-old daughter, Lati, as his mistress. Things get complicated when Lati rebels against her mother so she can return to school, and a prostitute is about to get killed by her vengeful husband.

== Cast ==
- Samata Das as Lati
- Tapas Paul as Ganesh
- Rituparna Sengupta as Rajani
- Sreelekha Mitra as Ayesha
- Sudipta Chakraborty as Basanti
- June Malia as Bakul
- Arpan Basar as Shibu
- Ram Gopal Bajaj as Natabar Paladhi
- Pradip Mukherjee as Nagen
- Pavan Bandhopadhyay
- Debjani Biswas
- Kajol Chowdhuri
- Ketaki Dutta
- Arjun Guha Thakurta
- Saroj Gupta
- Fakir Das Kumar
- Subrata Mukherjee
- Anup Mukhyopadhyay

== Crew ==
- Directed: Buddhadev Dasgupta
- Screenplay: Buddhadev Dasgupta
- Produced: Arya Bhattacharjee
- Music: Buddhadev Dasgupta
- Cinematography: Venu
- Film Editing: Raviranjan Maitra
- Art Direction: Kousik Sarkar

== Promotion ==
Directors like Dasgupta (and others of his ilk like Adoor Gopalakrishnan or Mrinal Sen) make movies that are very specific to their own cultural milieu. A great master like the late Satyajit Ray was never comfortable when he stepped outside his native Bengal with his camera. So too Dasgupta. His latest work, Mondo Meyer Upakhyan (A Tale of a Naughty Girl), is set in his favourite Purulia, a backward region in West Bengal. Beyond these main travails of Lati, Dasgupta presents a gripping account of village life. On Dasgupta's canvas, one witnesses life in all its splendour. A Tale of a Naughty Girl is undoubtedly a piece of celluloid that elevates cinema to another realm. It is extremely positive, and probably comes from a deep sense of peace and tranquillity that Dasgupta must have achieved from his poetic inclination.

== Released ==
Country	Date	Festivals
Canada	7 September 2002	(Toronto International Film Festival)
Brazil	25 October 2002	(Mostra BR de São Paulo)
South Korea	18 November 2002	(Pusan International Film Festival)
United States	14 January 2003	(Palm Springs International Film Festival)
Denmark	31 March 2003	(NatFilm Festival)
United States	4 April 2003	(Philadelphia International Film Festival)
France	17-May-03	(Cannes Film Festival)
UK	15-Jun-03	(Commonwealth Film Festival)
Russia	26-Jun-03	(Moscow Film Festival)
Czech Republic	09-Jul-03	(Karlovy Vary Film Festival)
Australia	18 September 2003	
United States	22-Oct-04	(Milwaukee International Film Festival)
France	17-Nov-04	
Poland	24-Jul-05	(Era New Horizons Film Festival)

== Awards ==
- 2003: Anandalok Awards – Best Director – Buddhadeb Dasgupta
- 2003: Best ASEAN Film Award – Buddhadev Dasgupta
- 2003: National Film Award for Best Feature Film – Arya Bhattacharya (Producer), Buddhadev Dasgupta (Director)
