= Dekha =

2001 film by Goutam Ghose

- Film poster
- Directed by: Goutam Ghose
- Screenplay by: Goutam Ghose
- Story by: Sunil Gangopadhyay
- Starring: Soumitra Chatterjee
- Cinematography: Goutam Ghose
- Edited by: Moloy Banerjee
- Music by: Goutam Ghose
- Release date: 2 February 2001
- Country: India
- Language: Bengali

Dekha is a 2001 Bengali drama film directed by Goutam Ghose. This was Ghose's ninth feature film and it was a successful one. At the 48th National Film Awards, the film was awarded Best Feature Film in Bengali, while Soumitra Chatterjee was awarded the Special Jury Award.

== Plot ==
The film revolves around an ageing poet Sashi Bhusan Sanyal afflicted with glaucoma and nearly blind whose wife has deserted him because of his reckless lifestyle.

== Cast ==
- Soumitra Chatterjee as Sashi Bhusan Sanyal
- Debashree Roy as Sarama
- Roopa Ganguly as Sashi Bhusan's wife
- Indrani Haldar as Reema
- Biplab Chatterjee as Biplob
- Haradhan Bannerjee as Sarama's father
- Paran Bandyopadhyay
- Anjan Dutt as Sarama's husband
- Kamal Kanjilal as Gagan Chandra Goon
