= Ashleelotar Daye =

1983 Bengali film

Ashlilatar Daye
- Directed by: Uma Nath Bhattacharya
- Story by: Narayan Sanyal
- Cinematography: Uma Nath Bhattacharya
- Distributed by: Mitali Films
- Release date: 1983
- Country: India
- Language: Bengali

Ashlilatar Daye (Bengali: অশ্লীলতার দায়ে) (meaning: "Accusation for vulgarity") is a Bengali drama film released in 1983. The film is based on a novel by Narayan Sanyal with the same title, which was published in 1975. Sanyal took this novel theme from Seven Minutes by Irving Wallace. This film was directed by Uma Nath Bhattacharya. Arundhati Holme Chowdhury and Haimanti Sukla sang in this film.

== Plot ==
The movie is based on a court trial of the case of a Bengali novel which is accused of obscenity. Young advocate Bhaskar defends the case arguing that this novel is not obscene or vulgar at all. Finally it is found that a retired judge had written the novel in a pen name when young and the story of it, was based on his personal experience.

== Cast ==
- Chiranjeet Chakraborty as Bhaskar
- Alpana Goswami as Antara
- Dilip Roy (actor) as Dr.Roy / Aprakash Gupta
- Biplab Chatterjee
- Anamika Saha as young Tatini
- Satya Banerjee
- Sanghmitra Banerjee
- Santana Basu
- Pradip Mukherjee as Nirmal
