= Charachar =

- A poster for Charachar
- Directed by: Buddhadev Dasgupta
- Written by: Buddhadev Dasgupta, Prafulla Roy (novel)
- Produced by: Gita Gope; Shankar Gope
- Cinematography: Soumendu Roy
- Edited by: Ujjal Nandi
- Music by: Biswadep Dasgupta
- Production company: Gope Movies
- Release date: 1993
- Running time: 97 minutes
- Country: India
- Language: Bengali

Charachar (English language:Shelter of the Wings, Bengali: চরাচর) is a 1993 Bengali drama film directed and written by Buddhadev Dasgupta based on a novel by Prafulla Roy.

== Plot ==
Lakha (Rajit Kapoor) comes from a family of bird catchers, but questions the value of catching birds. He, and the older Bhushan (Sadhu Meher), sell their caged birds to the local dealer. Lakha's wife, Sari (Laboni Sarkar), complains that he is not ambitious enough because he cares more for the birds than for her, and she starts meeting Natobar. Kalicharan, a city dealer, suggests they sell their birds directly to him. So Bhushan and Lakha take their next catch of birds on the train to Calcutta. Kalicharan invites them to a feast for the ceremony of the birds, with disastrous consequences.

== Cast ==
- Shankar Chakraborty
- Indrani Haldar as Gouri
- Rajit Kapoor as Lakhinder
- Sadhu Meher as Bhushan
- Manoj Mitra
- Laboni Sarkar as Sari

== Awards ==
- 1993 - National Film Award for Best Feature Film
- 1994 - Golden Bear (nominated) - 44th Berlin International Film Festival.
