= Antarjali Jatra =

1987 film

- Directed by: Gautam Ghose
- Written by: Kamal Kumar Majumdar (Story)
- Produced by: NFDC
- Starring: Shatrughan Sinha; Basanta Choudhury; Promode Ganguly; Rabi Ghosh; Shampa Ghosh
- Cinematography: Goutam Ghose
- Music by: Goutam Ghose
- Release date: 1987
- Country: India
- Language: Bengali

Antarjali Jatra (The Ultimate Journey, Bengali: অন্তর্জলী যাত্রা), also known as Antarjali Yatra, is a 1987 film directed by Kolkata-based Indian film director Goutam Ghose based on a novel, Mahayatra, by Kamal Kumar Majumdar. It documents the institution of Kulin Brahmin polygamy in nineteenth-century Bengal.

The film won the National Film Award for Best Feature Film in Bengali in 1988. It was screened in the Un Certain Regard section of the 1988 Cannes Film Festival.

== Plot ==
Seetaram, a wealthy Kulin Brahmin, is being taken to the banks of the Ganges to undergo the Antarjali (death) ritual. According to the family priest, he is supposed to die upon coming into contact with the river's sacred waters. However, Seetaram does not die, even after waiting for several days. An astrologer claims that Seetaram will not die alone and that he needs a companion, such as a wife. Seeing an opportunity in Seetaram's situation, an elderly Brahmin tries to find a husband for his daughter Yashobati, as he has no dowry to offer.

Meanwhile, Baiju, a kind-hearted Chandala (a traditionally outcast Hindu caste employed as crematorium workers), tries to persuade Yashobati, a newlywed, to run away with him. He explains that he cannot take part in the sinful act of building a funeral pyre for a newlywed and burning a young widow. He tries to convince her that the glory of Sati is hollow.

== Cast ==
- Shatrughan Sinha as Baiju
- Basanta Choudhury as Yashobati's Father
- Promode Ganguly as Seetaram
- Rabi Ghosh as an Astrologer
- Shampa Ghosh as Yashobati
- Mohan Agashe as Vaidya (Physician)

== Awards ==
The film won the National Film Award for Best Feature Film in Bengali in 1988.

It was screened in the Un Certain Regard section of the 1988 Cannes Film Festival and the Grand Prix at Tashkent Film Festival 1988.
