= Hirer Shikal =

1988 Bengali film

Hirer Shikal is a Bengali drama film directed by Murari Chakraborty. This film was released in 1988 under the banner of Tumpa films. The music of the film was scored by Rabin Banerjee.

== Plot ==
It is a story of rivalry between two brothers over their family diamonds. One brother hired an imposter lady and send her to another brother's house. Because she is the look-alike of their daughter Krishna. The parents could realise that she is not their daughter and they not only gift her those diamonds but also fix her marriage. When the imposter lady tries to steal and escape, she is caught and confesses the whole story to everyone.

== Cast ==
- Chiranjeet Chakraborty
- Debashree Roy
- Biplab Chatterjee
- Madhabi Mukherjee
- Shekhar Chatterjee
- Gita Dey
- Kajal Gupta
- Satya Banerjee
