= Biplab Chatterjee =

Indian Bengali film actor

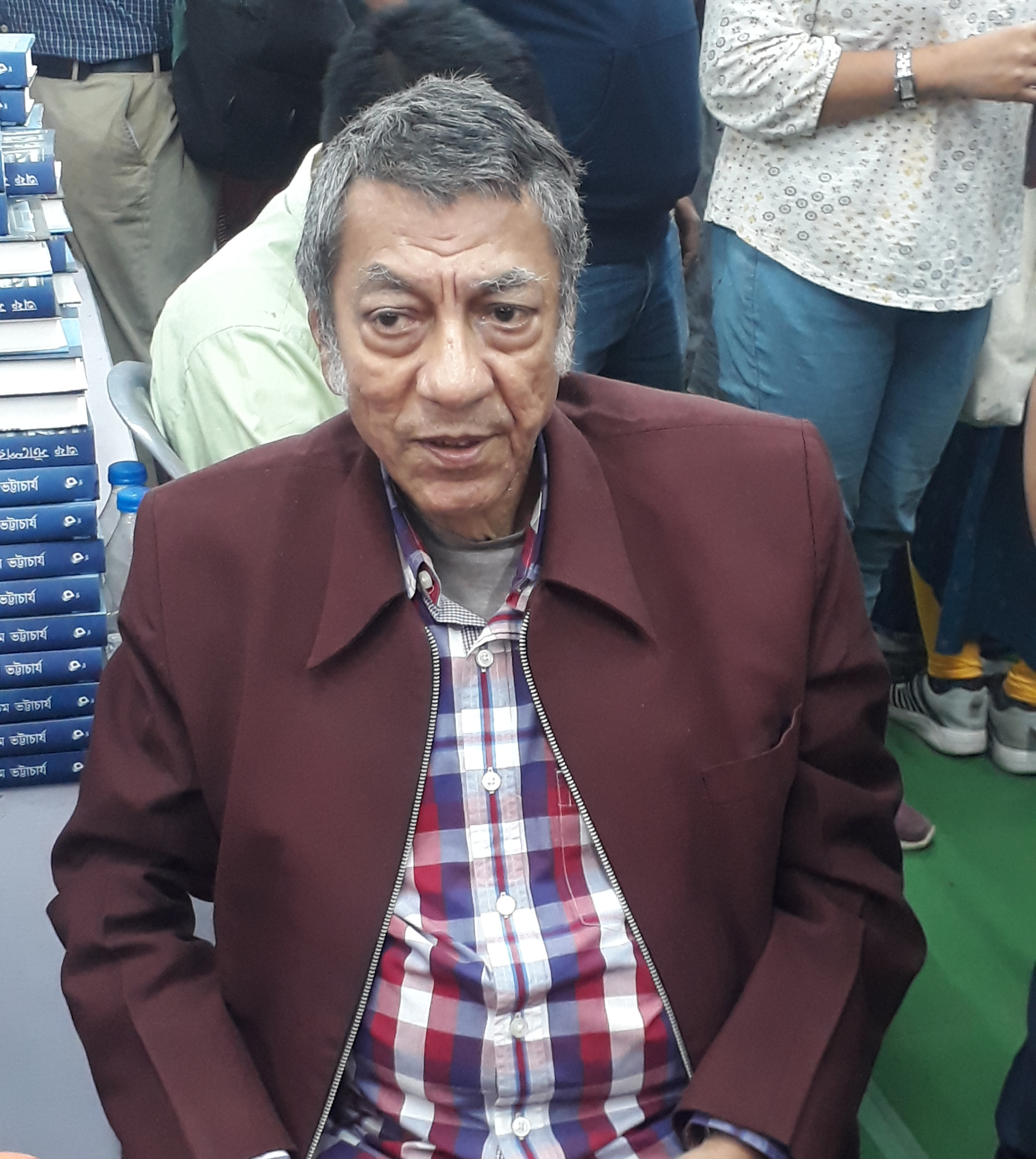
- Chatterjee in 2023
- Born: 8 July 1947 (age 79)
- Education: Anandamohan College (University of Calcutta)
- Occupations: Actor, Politician
- Years active: 1970–present
- Political party: Communist Party of India (Marxist)
- Spouse: Dipti Chatterjee
- Children: 1

Biplab Chatterjee (born 8 July 1947) is an Indian actor and director of television and films, mostly associated with the Bengali Film industry. His father was Sri Sanat Chatterjee.

He passed Higher Secondary examination in 1963 from Park Institution and graduated from Anandamohan College, an affiliate of the University of Calcutta, in 1965.

== Career ==
Biplab started his film career with Satyajit Ray in his film Pratidwandi. He is popular for his antagonistic character in Bengali films. Apart from his career in films, he has also shown interest in socio-political activities. In 1998, he was a candidate for assembly by-election from Rashbehari constituency with the Communist Party of India [Marxist], and lost to Sri Sobhandeb Chattopadhyay of the All India Trinamool Congress. In 2006 he contested from Alipore constituency as CPI(M) candidate and lost to Sri Tapas Paul of AITC.

== Filmography ==
Biplab Chatterjee filmography
Year	Movie	Role	Director
1970	Pratidwandi		Satyajit Ray
1971	Khunjey Berai		
1974	Chhera Tamsuk		Purnendu Patri
1975	Nagar Darpane		Yatrik
1977	Proxy		Dinen Gupta
1977	Din Amader		
1978	Charmurti		
1979	'Joi Baba Felunath		Satyajit Ray
1979	Sabuj Dwiper Raja		
1979	Ek Din Pratidin	Policeman	
1980	Bancharamer Bagan	Hontka and Kontka	
1981	Surya Sakhi		
1982	Chokh		Utpalendu Chakrabarty
1983	Phatik Chand	Shyamlal	
1984	Shatru		
1987	Pratikar		
1988	Hirer Shikal		
1989	Bagh Bahadur Hindi		
1989	East Bengaler Chele		
1992	Rakte Lekha		
1994	Phiriye Dao		
1997	Lal Darja		
1999	Jibon Niye Khela		
2001	Dekha		
2003	Moner Majhe Tumi		
2003	Patalghar	Vik	
2004	Swapne Dekha Rajkanya		
2004	Paribar		
2005	Rajmohol		
2005	Parineeta	Shyam Lal Tantiya	Pradeep Sarkar
2005	Agnipath		
2005	Manik	Kartik Sen	Provat Roy
2005	'Ek Muto Chobi in Ragun Babur Galpo	Ragun Babu	Provat Roy
2006	Refugee		
2007	Jara Bristite Bhijechhilo		
2007	Kailashe Kelenkari		
2007	Tulkalam in special appearance		
2008	Sedin Dujone		
2009	Bangal Ghoti Phataphati (Unreleased)		
2009	Magno Mainak		
2010	Gaj Ukiler Hatya Rahasya		
2010	Wanted		
2011	Tenida (film)		
2011	Shotru		
2011	Royal Bengal Rahasya		
2011	Gosainbaganer Bhoot		
2012	Teen Yaari Katha		
2012	Khokababu		
2012	Teen Kanya		
2012	Astra		
2012	Ullas		
2013	Nirbhoya		
2013	Rokto		
2017	Ei Toh Jeebon		
2017	Chaamp		
2019	Paran Bandhu Re		
2020	Asur		
2020	Rajar Kirty		

=== As director ===
- Chor O Bhagoban (2003)
- Tomar Aamar Prem (1998)
- Bidrohini (1994)
- Prajapati (1993)
- Abhimanyu (1990)

== Biography ==
Ami Biplab (2023), written by Suman Gupta and Biplab Chatterjee, Deep Prakashan, Kolkata.

On the occation of its publication on February 8, 2023, Biplab commented, "I have more enemies than friends in this industry. There There were so many influential people who literally pulled strings to sideline me and made sure I don’t get work. Some have even damaged my image spreading rumours and it affected my career when I need the industry the most."

== Awards ==
- BFJA for Best Supporting Actor for Debipaksha in 2005
- BFJA for Best Supporting Actor for Banaphul in 1997
