= Abar Aranye =

- DVD cover for Abar Aranye.
- Directed by: Goutam Ghose
- Written by: Goutam Ghose
- Starring: Soumitra Chatterjee; Subhendu Chatterjee; Saswata Chatterjee; Samit Bhanja; Sharmila Tagore; Champa; Roopa Ganguly; Tabu; Jisshu Sengupta
- Cinematography: Goutam Ghose
- Music by: Goutam Ghose
- Production companies: Rainbow; T Sarkar Productions
- Distributed by: T Sarkar Productions
- Release date: 16 May 2003
- Running time: 123 minutes
- Country: India
- Language: Bengali

Abar Aranye (English title: In the Forest ...Again) (2003) is an Indian Bengali-language drama film directed by Goutam Ghose.

== Plot ==
The film features the characters from Satyajit Ray's Aranyer Din Ratri, returning to the forest over thirty years later. Asim, Sanjoy, Harinath and Aparna have grown old in this film; Shekhar has died. They set out on a journey to break off every link with civilisation for a few days. However, the trip turns sour when Asim and Aparna's daughter, Amrita, goes missing. It transpires that she is being held for ransom by local tribespeople. Police intervene and the kidnapped girl is returned to her parents, albeit against her own wishes.

== Cast ==
- Soumitra Chatterjee as Asim
- Sharmila Tagore as Aparna (wife of Asim)
- Subhendu Chatterjee as Sanjoy
- Gulshan Ara Akter Champa As Champa (wife of Sanjoy)
- Tabu as Amrita (daughter of Ashim & Aparna)
- Samit Bhanja as Hari
- Roopa Ganguly as Shimul (wife of Hari)
- Saswata Chatterjee as Saswata (son of Sanjoy and Champa)
- Bidipta Chakraborty as Bidipta (wife of Saswata)
- Jisshu Sengupta as Jishu (friend of Saswata)
- Rajatava Dutta as manager of tea estate
- Chaiti Ghoshal as wife of manager

== Awards ==
- 2004 :BFJA Awards
- 2004 :National Award - Best Director for Goutam Ghose
- 2004 :National Award - Best Screenplay for Goutam Ghose
- 2004 :National Award - Best Supporting Actress for Sharmila Tagore
- 2003 :Nominated for Montreal World Film Festival
- 2003 :Nominated for International Film Festival of Marrakech
