= Bagh Bahadur =

- Directed by: Buddhadev Dasgupta
- Written by: Buddhadev Dasgupta; Prafulla Roy (story)
- Produced by: Buddhadev Dasgupta; Dulal K. Roy – Executive Producer
- Starring: Archana; Pavan Malhotra; M.V. Vasudeva Rao
- Cinematography: Venu
- Music by: Shantanu Mahapatra
- Release date: 1989
- Running time: 98 minutes
- Country: India
- Language: Bengali

Bagh Bahadur (Bengali: বাঘ বাহাদুর, translation: The Tiger Dancer) is a 1989 Bengali drama film directed and screenplayed by Buddhadev Dasgupta based on a short story of Prafulla Roy.

== Plot ==
The film is about a man, Ghumuram who paints himself as a tiger and dances in a village in Bengal. The movie conveys a strong message as it illustrates the hardships of rural village life in Bengal.

== Cast ==
- Archana as Radha
- Pavan Malhotra as Ghunuram
- M.V. Vasudeva Rao as Sibal
- Biplab Chatterjee
- Rajeswari Roychowdhury

== Awards ==
1989 – National Film Award for Best Feature Film
