= Dakhal =

- Directed by: Gautam Ghose
- Written by: Goutam Ghose; Partha Banerjee
- Story by: Sushil Jana
- Produced by: Government of West Bengal
- Starring: Mamata Shankar; Robin Sen Gupta; Sunil Mukherjee; Sujal Roy Chowdhury
- Cinematography: Goutam Ghose
- Music by: Goutam Ghose
- Release date: 1981
- Country: India
- Language: Bengali

Dakhal (transl. The Occupation) is a 1981 Indian Bengali film directed by Gautam Ghose, with Mamata Shankar, Robin Sen Gupta, Sunil Mukherjee and Sujal Roy Chowdhury in lead roles. The film is about a woman belonging to a nomadic tribe from Andhra Pradesh, known as crow hunters, who elopes and moves to south Bengal and makes a living by occult practices. It deals with the issue of exploitation of tribal people by a deceitful landlord. The film was based on Amma, a short story of Sushil Jana.

This the first Bengali-language feature film by Ghosh, who had previously made documentaries and Maa Bhoomi in Telugu. At the 29th National Film Awards it won the awards for Best Feature Film. At the 11th International Human Rights Film Festival in Paris it won the Grand Jury Prize.

== Cast ==
- Mamata Shankar as Andi
- Robin Sen Gupta
- Sunil Mukherjee
- Sujal Roy Chowdhury
- Bimal Deb
