= Dooratwa =

1978 film by Buddhadeb Dasgupta

- Directed by: Buddhadeb Dasgupta
- Written by: Buddhadeb Dasgupta
- Produced by: Buddhadeb Dasgupta
- Cinematography: Ranjit Roy
- Music by: Ain Rasheed Khan, Mahmud Mirza
- Release date: 21 March 1981
- Running time: 96 minutes
- Country: India
- Language: Bengali

Dooratwa (English: Distance) is a 1981 Bengali film directed and written by Buddhadeb Dasgupta. It won the National Film Award for Best Feature Film in Bengali.

== Plot ==
Mondar (P. Mukherjee), marries a young woman, Anjali. When the former rebel learns that Anjali is pregnant from another relationship, he leaves her. He also refuses shelter to a Naxalite on the run. The lonely teacher forms a relationship with another woman, who is a Personal secretary in a business firm and her insane mother, but class differences prevent this from going any further. In the end, he finds that the woman he rejected is mature enough to accept him as a friend and their relationship shows renewed promise as he tries to shed his prejudices. The film continued the Bengali cinema's fascination with the Naxalite uprising of the late 60s and 70s, often using symbolic imagery as in the opening shot of a newly paved VIP road and the commentary linking the annihilation of 'troublemakers' with the 'beautification' of the city. The film recalled aspects of Ray's 70s Calcutta films in its extensive use of silence and its consistently lyrical emphasis on the protagonist's subjectivity.

== Cast ==
- Bijon Bhattacharya
- Mamata Shankar as Anjali
- Pradip Mukherjee as Mondar
- Niranjan Ray
- Pravas Sarkar as Shaibal
