= Contemporary Indian Sculpture =

- Directed by: Buddhadev Dasgupta
- Written by: Buddhadev Dasgupta
- Produced by: Buddhadev Dasgupta
- Release date: 1987
- Running time: 152 minutes
- Country: India
- Language: Bengali

Contemporary Indian Sculpture is a 1987 Bengali documentary film directed and written by Buddhadev Dasgupta. It is a documentary on Indian sculpture.
