= Dulal Roy =

Indian theatre director

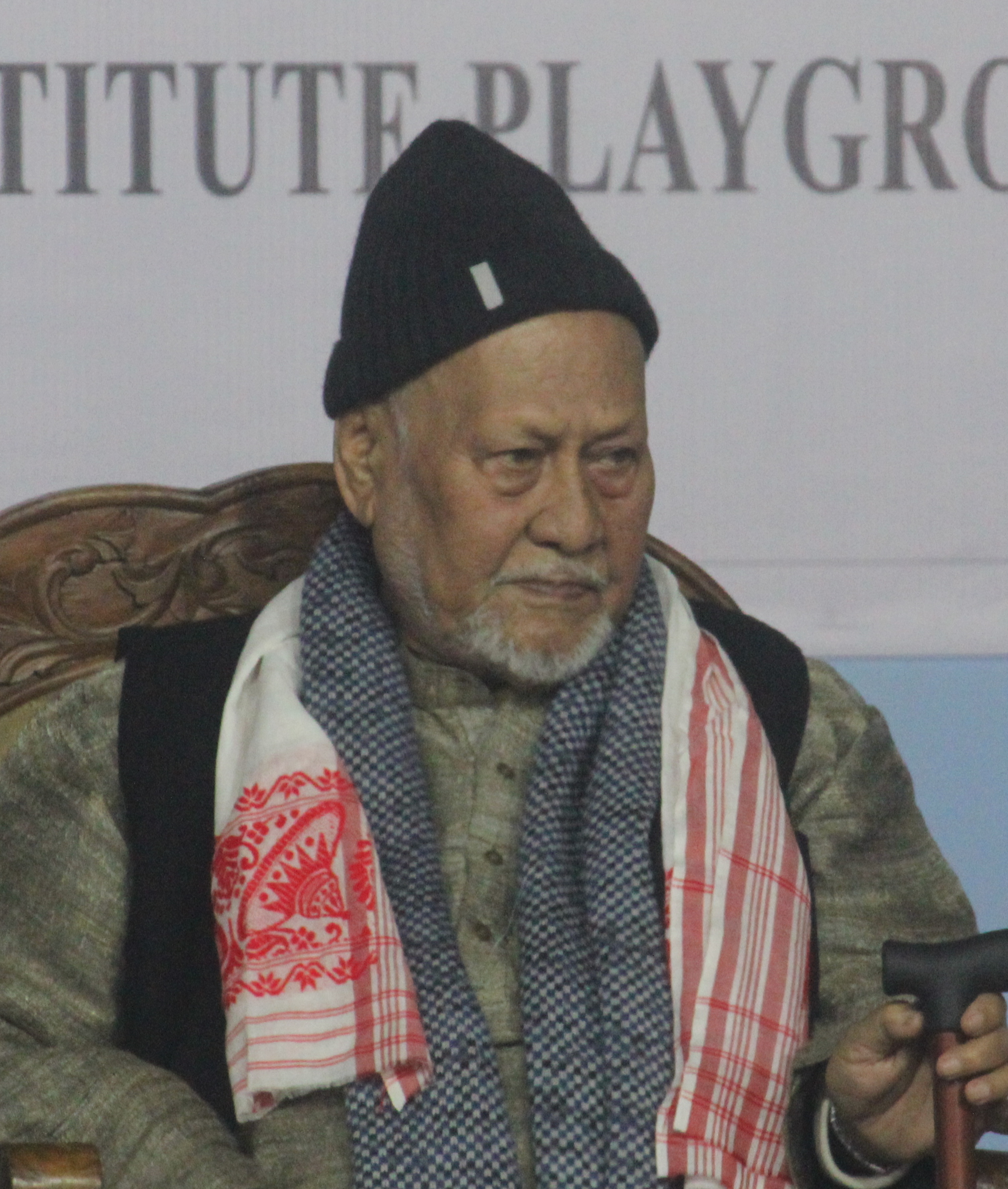
- Born: 1 April 1943 (age 83); Assam, British India
- Occupations: theatre actor, director and playwright
- Known for: Theatre
- Spouse: Santi Chaya Roy
- Children: Madhur Kankana Roy and Sumadhur Roy
- Parent: Dr. Tarani Kanta Roy
- Awards: Sangeet Natak Akademi Award for stage direction Sangeet Natak Akademi Fellowship; Natyasurya Phani Sharma Award by the Government of Assam

Dulal Roy is an Indian theatre actor, director, and playwright from Assam. He received the Sangeet Natak Akademi Award for stage direction, the Sangeet Natak Akademi Fellowship, and the Natyasurya Phani Sharma Award from the Government of Assam.

== Biography ==
Dulal Roy was born on 1 April 1943 in Sorbhog, Barpeta, Assam. He is the son of Dr. Tarani Kanta Roy, who was part of the Medical Corps of the Allied Forces. According to information gathered by the family, he was killed during World War II when the hospital he was attached to was subjected to Japanese aerial bombardment. His primary education was at Cotton Collegiate Government H.S. School in Guwahati, and he completed his graduation from Cotton College, Guwahati.

His affinity for drama, which began during his school days, intensified during his college years. In his second year of college, he translated Narayan Gangopadhyay's play Bharate Chai into Assamese under the title Janani and staged it. Its success led to the formation of a society called the Cotton College Dramatic Society.

Due to his interest in acting, after graduation Dulal Roy joined the National School of Drama in New Delhi and completed a diploma in dramatic arts in direction in 1966.

After completing his diploma, Roy returned to Assam with the aim of reviving the theatre scene in Assam, but two years later, in 1968, he joined the Film and Television Institute, Pune, to further his understanding of the various facets of audio-visual media, and obtained a diploma in film editing. During his time working with prominent filmmakers such as Tarun Dutta, Asit Sen, Rajinder Singh Bedi, and Hrishikesh Mukherjee, he worked as an assistant editor on films such as Zafar, Buddha Mil Gaya, Anand, and Dastak.

== Career ==
Roy has held many positions, such as Executive Board Member of the Sangeet Natak Akademi, Member of the Planning and Theatre Committee of the ICCR, Member of the Expert Committee of the National School of Drama, and Member of the Expert Committee for Young Theatre Workers of the Sangeet Natak Akademi. Later, he became the Project Director of the Sattriya Kendra, Guwahati, a centre started by the Sangeet Natak Akademi to support Sattriya and allied traditions, and in-charge of the Sangeet Natak Akademi's North East Centre, Guwahati.

== Works ==
Dulal Roy has directed over 80 plays, written numerous plays for stage, radio, and television, and acted in many plays. His play Prayosi is an independent adaptation based on George Bernard Shaw's Pygmalion. Another notable play is an independent adaptation of Nikolai Gogol's Russian satire The Government Inspector. Other notable plays include Jukti Tarka, Bismriti, Pon Rokshya, Kankalata, Swarthopor Daitya, Karengor Ligiri, Siraj, Andha Yug, Adhe Adhure, Ashadh Ka Ek Din, The Lesson, Bhogjora, Hamlet, Sarkari Inspector, and Waiting for Godot.

Roy directed the film Aashroy in 1979 and has also acted in several Assamese films.

== Awards and honours ==
=== Awards ===
- 1973: Best Production and Best Direction awards at the All India Full-Length Drama Competition held in Delhi (for Prayosi).
- 1977: Best Production and Best Direction awards at the All India Full-Length Drama Competition held in Delhi.
- 1999: Sangeet Natak Akademi Award for stage direction.
- 2019: Natyasurya Phani Sharma Memorial Award by the Government of Assam.
- 2022: Sangeet Natak Akademi Fellowship.
- 2022: Chatak Sanman.
- Chamanlal Memorial Award.
- Natya Bhaskar Samman.

=== Honours ===
A six-day photography exhibition titled Indulgence of the Spirit was organized in 2015 to honour Dulal Roy's career spanning over 50 years. The book Pratay and Annekhsan: Dulal Royor Sadhana, released in 2016 as a tribute to him, contains more than a hundred articles by his former associates and art critics.
