= Phera =

1988 Indian Bengali-language film

- Directed by: Buddhadeb Dasgupta
- Written by: Narendranath Mitra (story), Buddhadeb Dasgupta (script)
- Produced by: Buddhadeb Dasgupta
- Cinematography: Dhrubajyoti Bose
- Release date: 23 December 1988
- Running time: 94 minutes
- Country: India
- Language: Bengali

Phera (English language:The Return) is a 1988 Bengali drama film directed by Buddhadeb Dasgupta based on a story of Bengali novelist Narendranath Mitra. It was entered into the 38th Berlin International Film Festival, competition section.

== Plot ==
The film revolves around the life of Sasanka who lives a mournful life and relationship with the family.

== Cast ==
- Aloknanda Roy as Saraju
- Kamu Mukherjee as Mantu
- Sunil Mukherjee as Rashu
- Devika Mukherjee as Jamuna
- Subrata Nandy as Sasanka
- Aniket Sengupta as Kanu

== Awards ==
- 1987: National Film Award
  - Best Screenplay: Budhdhadeb Dasgupta
  - Best Feature Film in Bengali
  - Best Child Artist: Aniket Sengupta
