= Goutam Ghose =

Indian actor, director and screenwriter

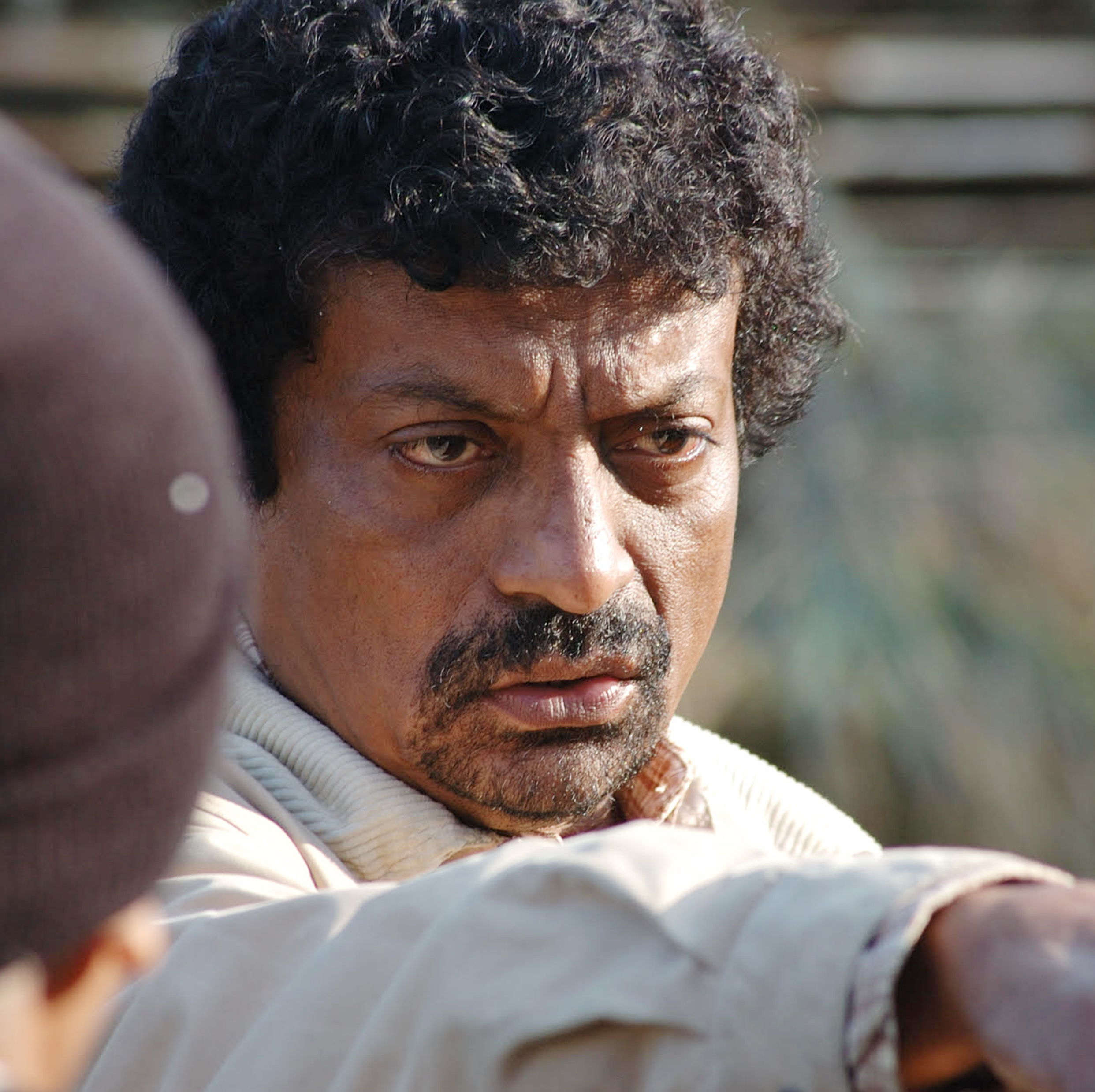
- Born: Goutam Ghose; 24 July 1950 (age 76); Calcutta, West Bengal, India
- Education: University of Calcutta
- Occupations: Director; Screenwriter; Actor; music director; cinematographer
- Spouse: Neelanjana Ghose (1978–2025)
- Children: Anandi Ghose, Ishaan Ghose

Goutam Ghose (Bengali pronunciation: [ɡou̯tom ɡʱoʃ]) (also spelled Gautam Ghosh; born 24 July 1950) is an Indian film director, actor, music director and cinematographer who works primarily in Bengali cinema. He is the only Indian to have received the "Vittorio Di Sica" Award, Italy, in 1997.

In 2012, the Government of West Bengal honored him with the Banga Bibhushan for lifetime achievement. Acknowledging his contributions to film, he was awarded the Knighthood of the Star of the Italian Solidarity in July 2006.

== Early life ==
Goutam Ghose was born on 24 July 1950 in Calcutta, India to Santana and Prof. Himangshu Kumar Ghose. His kindergarten days began at the St John's Diocesan School (now an all-girls school). He studied there till class 4 and then moved to the neighboring Cathedral Missionary Boys' School. He graduated from the University of Calcutta.

== Career ==
He started making documentaries in 1973. Took active part in group theatre movement in Calcutta. Also dedicated some time as a Photojournalist. Made his first documentary, New Earth, in 1973 followed by Hungry Autumn. Since then, he has made a number of feature films and documentaries. Ghose was greatly influenced by the movies of Akira Kurosawa' Homage, Satyajit Ray's adventure film, Ritwik Ghatak's hyperlink cinema, Rajen Tarafdar's partition of India in film, Mrinal Sen's New Indian Cinema, and Ajoy Kar's social realism, who had heralded a new era in Bengali movie through his works.

His most successful films were Antarjali Jatra, Padma Nadir Majhi, Abar Aranye, Kaalbela, Shankhachil and Moner Manush. He came into limelight for these films.

== Filmography ==
Denotes film that has not yet been released

=== As film director ===
Feature films
Year	Title	Language	Director	Music	Cinematographer	Notes
1980	Maa Bhoomi	Telugu	Yes	Yes	No	
1981	Dakhal	Bengali	Yes	Yes	Yes	
1984	Paar	Hindi	Yes	Yes	Yes	
1987	Antarjali Jatra	Bengali	Yes	Yes	Yes	
1992	Padma Nadir Majhi	Bengali	Yes	Yes	Yes	Indo-Bangladesh joint production
1993	Patang	Hindi	Yes	Yes	Yes	
1997	Gudia	Hindi	Yes	Yes	Yes	
2001	Dekha	Bengali	Yes	Yes	Yes	
2003	Abar Aranye	Bengali	Yes	Yes	Yes	
2006	Yatra	Hindi	Yes	Yes	Yes	Also editor
2009	Kaalbela	Bengali	Yes	Yes	Yes	
2010	Moner Manush	Bengali	Yes	Yes	No	Indo-Bangladesh joint production
2013	Shunyo Awnko	Bengali	Yes	No	No	
2016	Shankhachil	Bengali	Yes	No	No	Indo-Bangladesh joint production
2022	Raahgir – The Wayfarers	Hindi	Yes	No	No	
2025	Parikrama	English / Hindi / Italian	Yes	No	No	

Documentaries
Year	Title	Language
1973	New Earth	English
1974	Hungry Autumn	English
1986	The Land of Sand Dunes	English
1988	In search of Theater- Utpal Dutta on Utpal Dutta	Bengali/English
1989	Sange Meel Se Mulaqat- On Ustad Bismillah Khan	Hindi
1990	Mohor- On Kanika Banerjee	Hindi
1996	Beyond the Himaylayas	English
1999	Ray: life and work on Satyajit Ray	English
2000	Kalahandi	English
2004	Impermanance- On Dalai Lama	English
2005	Journey with Jyoti Basu	Bengali/English
2007	Rivers of Knowledge- A Film on Asiatic Society	English
2008	In Search of Raja- On Raja Ram Mohan Roy	English
2012	L'archivio a oriente	Italian, Persian, Chinese
2013	Subha & Me- On Artist Subhaprasanna	Bengali/English
2014	The Magic of Making- On K. G. Subramanyan	English
2017	A Temple to Solomon- On Calcutta High Court	English

Short films
Year	Title	Language
1987	Ek Ghat Ki Kahani	Hindi
1993	Sham Hi Toh Hai	Hindi
1998	Fakir	Hindi
2021	Somoyer Smritimala	Bengali

=== As actor ===
As actor
Year	Title	Role	Language	Notes
1982	Grihajuddha	Sandipan	Bengali	
1996	Vrindavan Film Studios		Italian	
2011	Baishe Srabon	Nibaron Chakraborty	Bengali	
2012	Ekla Akash		Bengali	
2014	Chotushkone	Sakyo/Animesh	Bengali	Dual roles
2017	Beyond the Clouds	Akshi	English / Hindi	
2018	Guptodhoner Sandhane	Harinarayan Singha Roy	Bengali	Cameo appearance
2019	Shantilal O Projapoti Rohoshyo	editor of The Sentinel	Bengali	

== Awards and recognitions ==
Hungry Autumn (documentary):

- Main Award, Oberhausen Film Festival (1978)

Land of Sand Dunes (documentary):

- National Film Award for Best Non-Feature Film (1986)

Meeting a Milestone (documentary):

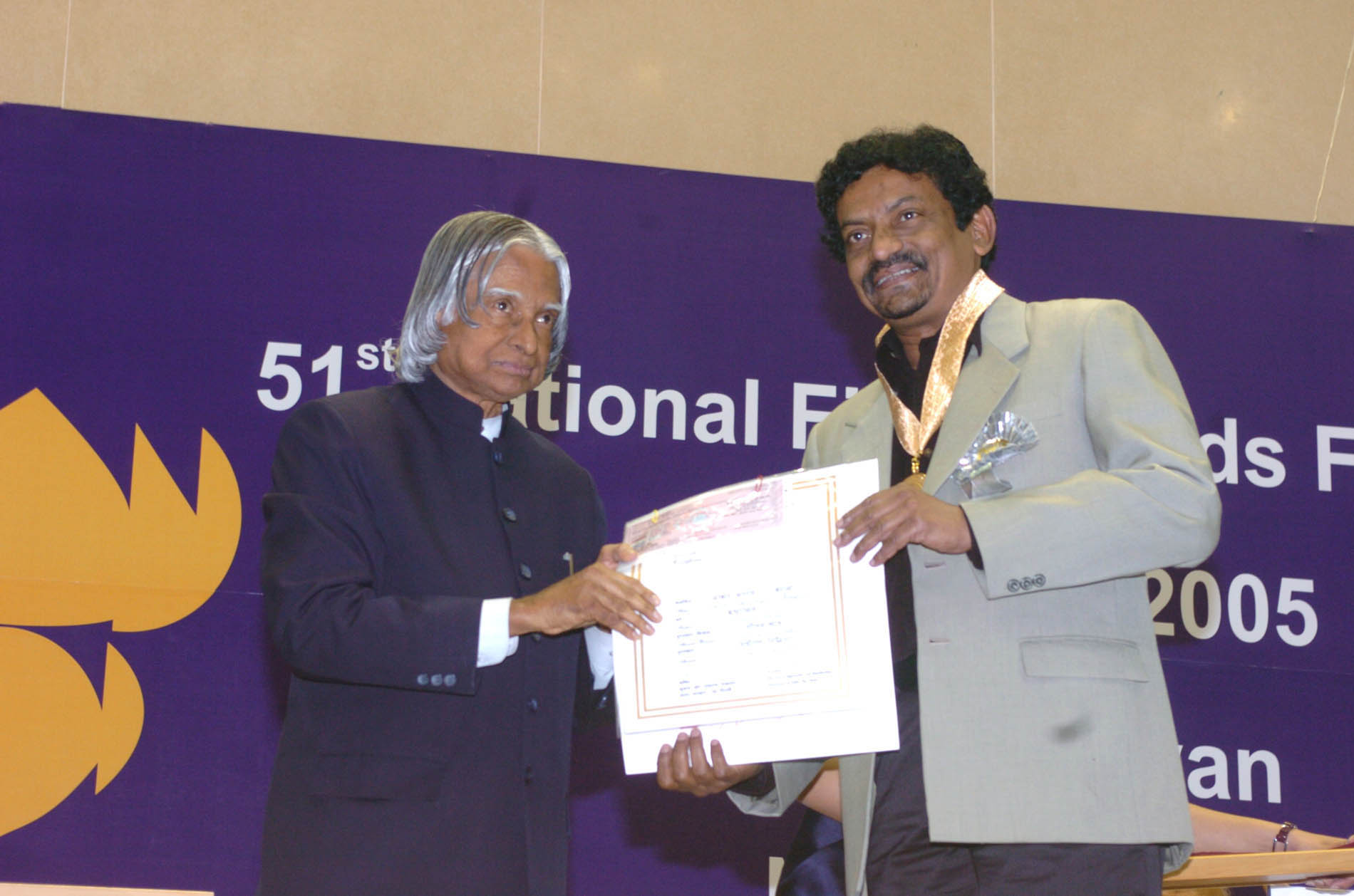
- The President Dr. A.P.J. Abdul Kalam presenting the Best Direction Award for the year 2004 to Mr. Goutam Ghose
  Special screening at the Cannes Film Festival, (out of competition)

Maa Bhoomi:

- Nandi Award for Best Feature Film
- Filmfare Award for Best Film – Telugu

Dakhal:

- National Film Award for Best Feature Film (1982)
- Silver Medal at Figuera De Foz, Portugal (1982)
- Ecumenical Jury Prize for Human Rights Festival at Strasbourg, France (1982)

Paar:

- National Film Award for Best Feature Film in Hindi(1985)
- National Film Award for Best Actor and Actress (1985)
- UNESCO Award at Venice Film Festival (1984)
- Best Actor at Venice Film Festival (1984)
- FIPRESCI Award, Red Cross Award at Verna Film Festival (1987).
- Filmfare Award for Best Direction and Best Screenplay

Antarjali Jatra:

- National Film Award for Best Feature Film in Bengali (1987)
- Un-Certain Regards, Cannes Film Festival (1988)
- Grand Prix – Golden Semurg at Tashkent Film Festival (1988)

Padma Nadir Majhi:

- National Film Award for Best Direction (1992)
- National Film Award for Second Best Feature Film (1992).
- UNESCO Award, Cannes Film Festival (1993).

Patang:

- National Film Award for Best Feature Film in Hindi (1993)
- Best Actress Award at Taormina Film Fest, Italy – Shabana Azmi (1994)

Beyond the Himalayas (documentary):

- Filmfare Award for Best Documentary

Gudia:

- National Film Award for Best Feature Film in Hindi (1996)
- Un-Certain Regards, Cannes Film Festival (1997)

Dekha:

- National Film Award for Best Feature Film in Bengali (2001)
- Silver Balloon Award, Nantes Film Festival

Kalahandi (documentary):

- National Film Award for Best Investigative Film (2002)

A Treasure in the Snow (documentary):

- National Film Award for Best Promotional Film (2003)

Abar Aranye:

- National Film Award for Best Direction
- National Film Award for Best Screenplay

Impermanence (documentary):

- Premiered at the Venice International Film Festival (2004)

Yatra:

- National Film Award for Best Cinematography

Moner Manush:

- Nargis Dutt Award for Best Feature Film on National Integration (A National award)
- Golden Peacock for Best Film at the 41st International Film Festival of India held at Goa.

Shankhachil:

- National Film Award for Best Feature Film in Bengali
- 41st Bangladesh National Film Awards for Best Actress, Best child Artist and Best art Direction.
- Montreal World Film Festival For Nominate

Special Awards:

- Is the only Indian to have received the "Vittorio Di Sica" Award, Italy, 1997
- Was awarded the Knighthood of the "Star of the Italian Solidarity" in July 2006
- Awarded the Banga Bibhushan for lifetime achievement in film direction in 2012
- UNESCO Award (1985)
- Kalakar Awards
- PIFF Distinguished Award (2024)

=== Honours ===
- In 2017, he was inducted as a member of the Oscar Academy
- Honorary Doctorate by Adamas University
- Honorary Doctorate by Sidho-Kanho-Birsha University
- In 2026, Ghose joined the Gold Mercury Council, the international advisory council of Gold Mercury International.

== As an avant-garde poet ==
Ghose has portrayed the role of a Hungry generation poet in Srijit Mukherji's film Baishe Srabon (2011) and also penned the poems of the character he played.

== See also ==
- Kamaleshwar Mukherjee
- Ishaan Ghose
