= Buddhadeb Dasgupta =

Indian director (1944–2021)

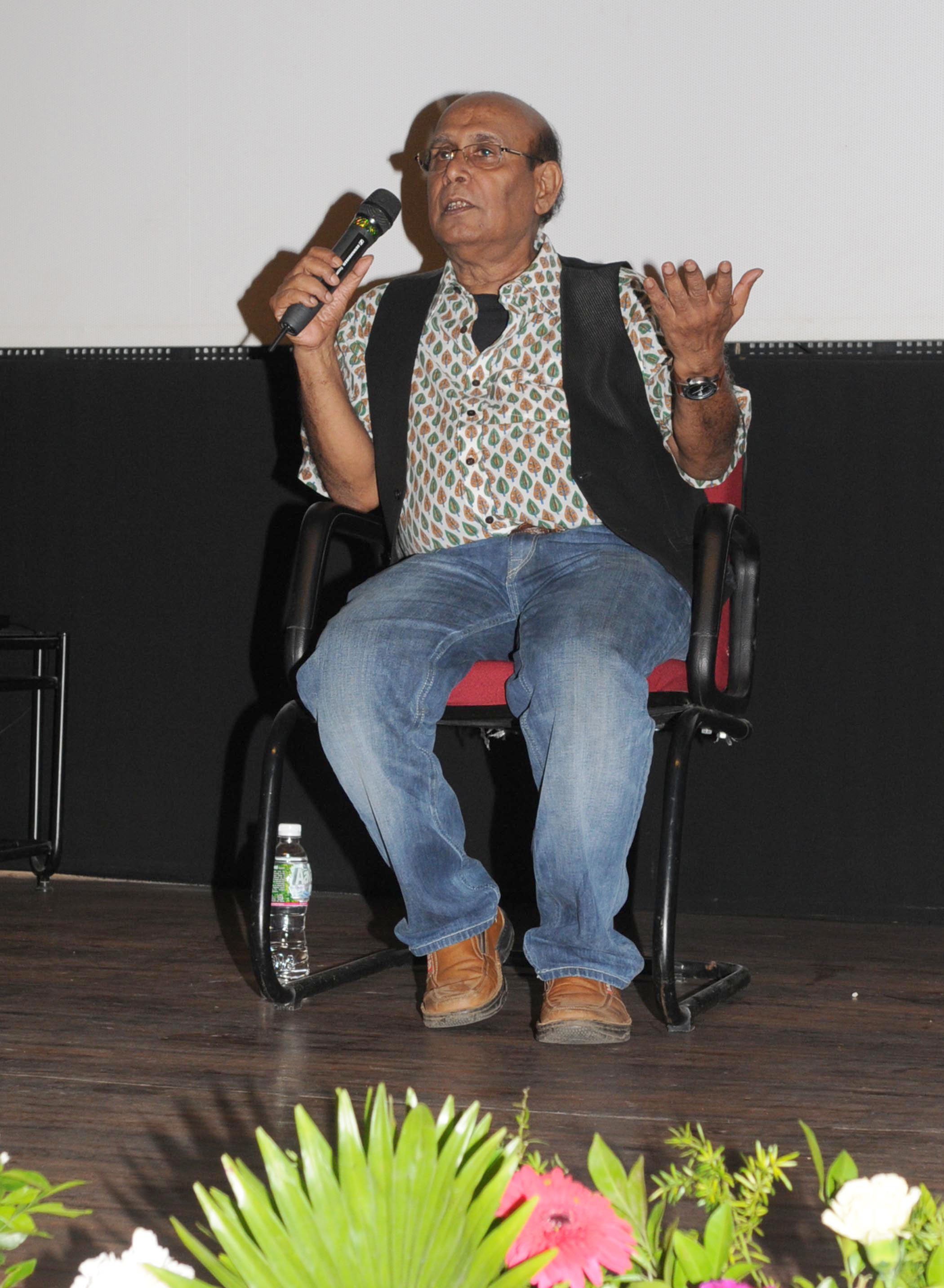
- Dasgupta at the IFFI 2014
- Born: 11 February 1944; Anara, Bengal Presidency, British India (present-day Purulia, West Bengal, India)
- Died: 10 June 2021 (aged 77); Kolkata, West Bengal, India
- Occupations: Film maker, screenplay writer and author
- Children: Alokananda Dasgupta

Buddhadeb Dasgupta (11 February 1944 – 10 June 2021) was an Indian filmmaker and poet best known for his Bengali-language films like Bagh Bahadur, Tahader Katha, Charachar and Uttara. Five of his films have won the National Film Award for Best Feature Film, Bagh Bahadur (1989), Charachar (1993), Lal Darja (1997), Mondo Meyer Upakhyan (2002) and Kaalpurush (2008), while Dooratwa (1978) and Tahader Katha (1993) have won the National Film Award for Best Feature Film in Bengali. As a director, he has won National Film Award for Best Direction twice, for Uttara (2000) and Swapner Din (2005). Over the years he has published several works of poetry including Govir Araley, Coffin Kimba Suitcase, Himjog, Chhaata Kahini, Roboter Gaan, Sreshtha Kabita, and Bhomboler Ascharya Kahini O Ananya Kabita.

== Early life and education ==
Buddhadeb Dasgupta was born in a Vaidya family in 1944 in Anara near Puruliya in Southern West Bengal, and was the third of nine siblings. His father Tarkanta Dasgupta was a doctor with the Indian Railways, thus he spent the early part of childhood traveling. At the age of twelve, he was sent to Calcutta to study, earlier at Shibpur SSPS Vidyalaya and later at Dinabandhu School, Howrah. Post-independence his father was transferred first to Kharagpur in West Midnapore district and Manendragarh (now in Chhattisgarh).

He studied economics at the Scottish Church College and the University of Calcutta.

== Career ==
Buddhadeb started his career as a lecturer of economics, at the Shyamsundar College of the University of Burdwan followed by City College, Calcutta. In 1976, when disenchanted by the gap he perceived between the economic theory he taught and the socio-political reality, he took to film making. Meanwhile, his membership with the Calcutta Film Society, where he started going in his senior high school along with his uncle, exposed him to the works of directors like Charlie Chaplin, Ingmar Bergman, Akira Kurosawa, Vittorio De Sica, Roberto Rossellini, and Michelangelo Antonioni. This, in turn, inspired him to take film making as a mode of expression. He started his film career with a 10-minute documentary in 1968, The Continent of Love; eventually he made his first full-length feature film, Dooratwa (Distance) in 1978.

His lyricism has been extended to cinema as well. During the early stages of his film career, Dasgupta made films inspired by Satyajit Ray's realistic films and later moved on to other forms of Andrei Tarkovsky. Some of his most acclaimed films are Bagh Bahadur, Tahader Katha, Charachar and Uttara.

== Filmography ==
=== Feature films ===
- Samayer Kache (1968) (short)
- Dooratwa (1978) (Distance)
- Neem Annapurna (1979) (Bitter Morsel)
- Grihajuddha (1982) (The Civil War)
- Andhi Gali (1984) (Blind Alley, Hindi)
- Phera (1988) (The Return)
- Bagh Bahadur (1989) (The Tiger Man)
- Tahader Katha (1992) (Their Story)
- Charachar (1993) (Shelter of the Wings)
- Lal Darja (1997) (The Red Door)
- Uttara (2000) (The Wrestlers)
- Mondo Meyer Upakhyan (2002) (A Tale of a Naughty Girl)
- Swapner Din (2004) (Chased by Dreams)
- Ami, Yasin Ar Amar Madhubala (2007) (The Voyeurs)
- Kaalpurush (2008) (Memories in the Mist)
- Janala (2009) (The Window)
- Mukti (2012)
- Choli Ke Pichey (2012) (TV Movie)
- Arjun (2012) (TV Movie)
- The Station (2013) (TV Movie)
- Anwar Ka Ajab Kissa (2013) (Sniffer, Hindi)
- Tope (2017)
- Urojahaj (2018)

=== Documentary and TV work ===
- The Continent of Love (1968)
- Dholer Raja Khirode Natta (1973)
- Fishermen of Sundarban (1974)
- Saratchandra (1975)
- Rhythm of Steel (1981)
- Indian Science Marches Ahead (1984)
- Vigyan O Tar Avishkar (1980)
- Story of Glass (1985)
- India on the Move (1985)
- Ceramics (1986)
- Aranyak (1996)
- Contemporary Indian Sculpture (1987)
- History of Indian Jute (1990)

== Awards ==
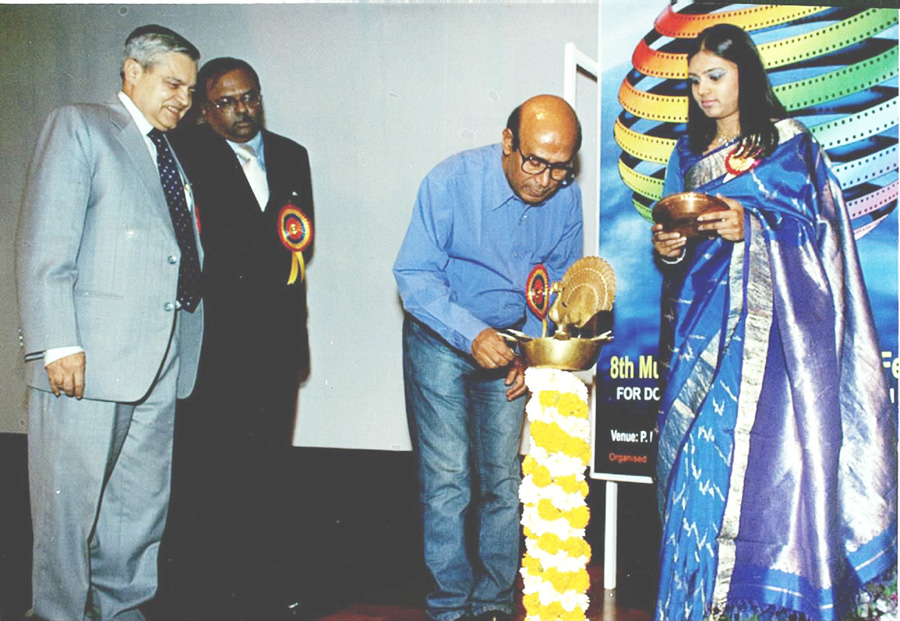
Dasgupta (second from right) inaugurating 8th Mumbai International Film Festival, at the P.L. Deshpande Auditorium in Mumbai on 3 February 2004

- Buddhadeb Dasgupta was honoured with the lifetime achievement award at the Spain International Film Festival in Madrid on 27 May 2008.
- Golden Athena Award at the Athens International Film Festival in 2007
- National Film Award
  - Best Film
    - 1989: Bagh Bahadur
    - 1993: Charachar
    - 1997: Lal Darja
    - 2002: Mondo Meyer Upakhyan
    - 2008: Kaalpurush
  - Best Direction
    - 2000: Uttara
    - 2005: Swapner Din
  - Best Screenplay
    - 1987: Phera
  - Best Feature Film in Bengali
    - 1978: Dooratwa
    - 1987: Phera
    - 1993: Tahader Katha
  - Best Arts/Cultural Film
    - 1998: A Painter of Eloquent Silence: Ganesh Pyne
- Venice Film Festival
  - 1982: Golden Lion nomination: Grihajuddha
  - 1982: FIPRESCI award: Grihajuddha
  - 2000: Golden Lion nomination: Uttara
  - 2000: Silver Lion for Best Director: Uttara
- Berlin International Film Festival
  - 1988: Golden Bear nomination: Phera
  - 1994: Golden Bear nomination: Charachar
- Locarno Film Festival
  - Critic's Award: Dooratwa
  - Special Jury Award: Neem Annapurna
- Asia Pacific Film Festival
  - Best Film: Janala
- Karlovy Vary Film Festival
  - Special Jury Award: Neem Annapurna
- Damascus International Film Festival
  - Golden Prize: Neem Annapurna
- Bangkok International Film Festival
  - Best Asian Film Award (2003): Mondo Meyer Upakhyan

== Family ==
His youngest daughter, Alokananda Dasgupta, a trained classical pianist, composed the background score for his 2013 film, Anwar Ka Ajab Kissa.

== Death ==
He died at the age of 77 on 10 June 2021.

== Media ==
=== Film ===
A documentary titled Maestro: A Portrait — A Film on Buddhadeb Dasgupta was released in 2013 by filmmaker Supriya Suri. The documentary examines Dasgupta's life and works.

== See also ==
- Aditya Vikram Sengupta
