= Debashree Roy filmography =

- Film: 100+
- Television film: 1
- Television series: 10+
- Hosting: 1

Debashree Roy is an Indian actress who has performed in more than a hundred films. She is a National Award winner actress and known for her work in Hindi as well as Bengali cinema. She has been a highly successful leading actress in Bengali cinema throughout eighties and nineties as well as a critically acclaimed actress.

Her first acting assignment was Hiranmoy Sen's Bengali devotional film Pagal Thakur (1966) where she was cast as an infant Ramakrishna Paramhansa and rose to prominence after she had been cast as Ranu in Tarun Majumdar's Bengali suspense thriller Kuheli (1971). Her first leading role came with Arabinda Mukhopadhyay's Bengali flick Nadi Theke Sagare (1978). She shot to a wider recognition after she had been cast in Aparna Sen's directorial debut 36 Chowringhee Lane (1981) and Kanak Mishra's Jiyo To Aise Jiyo (1981) under Rajshri Productions. Her other Hindi films include Desh Gautam's Bura Aadmi (1982), Kovelamudi Raghavendra Rao's Justice Chaudhury (1983), Mukul Dutt's Phulwari (1984), Akash Jain's Seepeeyan (1984), Vijay Singh's Kabhi Ajnabi The (1985), Kanak Mishra's Pyar Ka Sawan (1989), Bhabendra Nath Saikia's Kaal Sandhya (1997), Prasanta Bal's Hindustani Sipahi (2002). In 1985, she acted in Tarun Majumdar's romantic flick Bhalobasa Bhalobasa which was a major success at box office. This film ensured Roy's pairing with Tapas Paul as the leading on-screen pairing of nineteen eighties. Her other major hits with Paul includes films such as Lalmahal (1986), Uttar Lipi (1986), Arpan (1987), Shankhachur (1988), Surer Sathi (1988), Surer Akashe (1988), Nayanmani (1989), Chokher Aloy (1989), Shubha Kamana (1991), Mayabini (1992), Phire Paoa (1993), Tobu Mone Rekho (1994), Putra Badhu (1998) and Sundar Bou (1999).

Roy had also hits with Prosenjit Chatterjee and Chiranjeet Chakraborty. Her pairing with Chakraborty conveyed major hits like Mouna Mukhar (1987), Heerer Shikal (1988), Papi (1990), Tomar Rakte Amar Sohag (1993), Bhoy (1996), Beyadap (1996), Jiban Jouban (1997), Joddha (1987), Debanjali (2000). Her hits with Chatterjee are Samrat O Sundari (1987), Debi Baran (1988), Ora Charjon (1988), Jhankar (1989), Ahankar (1991), Raktelekha (1992), Purushottam (1992), Rakter Swad (1993), Shraddhanjali (1993), Nati Binodini (1994) . She further received critical acclaim for her performance in Anutap and Unishe April (1994). She has been cited as "the reigning queen of Bengali commercial cinema." Actor Prosenjit Chatterjee described her as the finest actress in Kolkata.

== Key ==
Key
| † | Denotes films that have not yet been released |

== English film ==
| Year | Title | Role | Notes | Ref. |
|---|---|---|---|---|
| 1981 | 36 Chowringhee Lane | Nandita | | |
| 2006 | Wild Bengal | | Documentary film | |

== Hindi film ==
| Year | Title | Role | Notes | Ref. |
|---|---|---|---|---|
| 1978 | Ghata | Sheetal | | |
| 1981 | Jiyo To Aise Jiyo | Vidya | | |
| 1982 | Bura Aadmi | | | |
| 1983 | Justice Chaudhury | Laxmi | | |
| 1984 | Phulwari | Lali | | |
| 1984 | Seepeeyan | Kalyani | | |
| 1985 | Kabhie Ajnabi The | Geeta | | |
| 1985 | Pyar Badhate Chalo | | | |
| 1989 | Mamta Ki Chhaon Mein | | Cameo | |
| 1989 | Pyar Ka Sawan | | | |
| 1994 | Chubhan | | | |
| 1995 | Daughters of This Century | Manorama/ Rama | | |
| 1997 | Kaal Sandhya | | | |
| 1998 | Swami Vivekananda | Sarada Devi | | |
| 2002 | Hindustani Sipahi | Shachi | | |

== Hindi TV series ==
| Year | TV Series | Role | Network | Notes | Ref. |
|---|---|---|---|---|---|
| 1988 | Mahabharat | Satyavati | Doordarshan | | |
| 1992 | Banjara | | Doordarshan | | |
| 1997 | Samarpan | Tishyaraksha | Zee Tv | | |

== Tamil film ==
| Year | Title | Notes | Ref. |
|---|---|---|---|
| 1987 | Manaivi Ready | Credited as Sinthamani | |

== Malayalam film ==
| Year | Title | Notes | Ref. |
|---|---|---|---|
| 1978 | Ee Ganam Marakkumo | Credited as Rugmini Roy | |

== Kannada film ==
| Year | Title | Role | Notes | Ref. |
|---|---|---|---|---|
| 1972 | Sipayi Ramu | | | |

== Bengali film ==
| Year | Film | Role | Notes | Ref. |
|---|---|---|---|---|
| 1966 | Pagal Thakur | Gadadhar | Credited as Chumki Roy for the first time | |
| 1969 | Balak Gadadhar | Gadadhar/ Devi Kanya Kumari | | |
| 1970 | Rupasi | | | |
| 1971 | Kuheli | Ranu | | |
| 1976 | Sudur Niharika | | Credited as Rumki Roy for the first time | |
| 1978 | Aguner Phulki | | | |
| 1978 | Nadi Theke Sagare | Champa | Played leading role for the first time | |
| 1978 | Ranger Saheb | Soniya | | |
| 1979 | Lattu | | | |
| 1979 | Jiban Jerakam | | | |
| 1980 | G T Road | | | |
| 1980 | Dadar Kirti | Bini | Credited as Debasree Roy for the first time | |
| 1981 | Father | | | |
| 1981 | Subarna Golak | | | |
| 1982 | Aparupa | | | |
| 1982 | Meghmukti | | | |
| 1982 | Troyee | | | |
| 1983 | Agamikal | | | |
| 1983 | Nishibhor | | | |
| 1983 | Samapti | | Romantic lead opposite Paul for the first time | |
| 1984 | Bishabriksha | Kundanandini | | |
| 1984 | Parabat Priya | | | |
| 1984 | Prarthana | | Cameo | |
| 1984 | Sagar Balaka | | | |
| 1985 | Bhalobasa Bhalobasa | Keya | | |
| 1985 | Nishantay | | | |
| 1986 | Abhishap | | | |
| 1986 | Artanad | | | |
| 1986 | Jiban | | | |
| 1986 | Lalmahal | | | |
| 1986 | Madhumoy | | | |
| 1986 | Parinati | | | |
| 1986 | Tin Purush | | | |
| 1986 | Uttar Lipi | | | |
| 1987 | Arpan | | | |
| 1987 | Gayak | | | |
| 1987 | Mouna Mukhar | | | |
| 1987 | Pratikar | | | |
| 1987 | Samrat O Sundari | | | |
| 1988 | Agaman | | | |
| 1988 | Debi Baran | | | |
| 1988 | Hirer Shikal | | Double role | |
| 1988 | Ora Charjon | | | |
| 1988 | Shankhachur | | | |
| 1988 | Sobar Upore | | Bangladeshi film | |
| 1988 | Surer Akashe | | | |
| 1988 | Surer Sathi | | | |
| 1989 | Agnitrishna | | Cameo | |
| 1989 | Akrosh | | | |
| 1989 | Aparanher Alo | | | |
| 1989 | Asha | | | |
| 1989 | Chhandaneer | | Cameo | |
| 1989 | Chokher Aloy | | | |
| 1989 | Jhankar | | | |
| 1989 | Nayanmoni | | | |
| 1990 | Bhagyalipi | | | |
| 1990 | Debata | | | |
| 1990 | Garmil | | | |
| 1990 | Papi | | | |
| 1990 | Jibon Songi | | | |
| 1991 | Agnisakshi | | | |
| 1991 | Ahankar | | | |
| 1991 | Sadharan Meye | | | |
| 1991 | Shubho Kamana | | | |
| 1991 | Thikana | | | |
| 1992 | Anutap | | | |
| 1992 | Gunjan | | | |
| 1992 | Mayabini | | Double role | |
| 1992 | Pitrireen | Shanu | | |
| 1992 | Prem | | | |
| 1992 | Purushottam | | | |
| 1992 | Raktelekha | | | |
| 1993 | Mayer Ashirbad | | | |
| 1993 | Phire Paoa | | | |
| 1993 | Rakter Swad | | | |
| 1993 | Shraddhanjali | Bobby | Shared screen with Satabdi Roy for the first time | |
| 1993 | Tomar Rakte Aamar Sohag | | | |
| 1994 | Cinemay Jemon Hoy | | | |
| 1994 | Nagpanchami | | | |
| 1994 | Nati Binodini | Binodini | | |
| 1994 | Rajar Raja | | | |
| 1994 | Rakta Nadir Dhara | | | |
| 1994 | Sandhyatara | | | |
| 1994 | Tobu Mone Rekho | | | |
| 1996 | Beyadap | | | |
| 1996 | Bhoy | | | |
| 1996 | Lathi | Kalyani | | |
| 1996 | Rabibar | | Delayed release | |
| 1996 | Unishe April | Aditi | | |
| 1997 | Jiban Jouban | | | |
| 1997 | Yoddha | | | |
| 1998 | Ajab Gayer Ajab Katha | | | |
| 1998 | Daho | | | |
| 1998 | Ganga | | | |
| 1998 | Putrabadhu | | | |
| 1999 | Asukh | Rohini Chowdhury | | |
| 1999 | Jiban Niye Khela | | | |
| 1999 | Rajdanda | | Double role, Cameo | |
| 1999 | Sundar Bou | | | |
| 2000 | Chaka | | | |
| 2000 | Debanjali | | Produced by Debashree Roy Telemedia | |
| 2000 | Joy Maa Durga | | | |
| 2001 | Dekha | | | |
| 2001 | Ek Je Achhe Kanya | | | |
| 2002 | Abaidha | | | |
| 2002 | Antarghat | | | |
| 2002 | Chhelebela | Kadambari Devi | | |
| 2002 | Ferari Fauj | Shachi | | |
| 2002 | Gandharbi | | | |
| 2002 | Shilpantar | | | |
| 2003 | Amar Bandhua | | | |
| 2003 | Mej Didi | | | |
| 2004 | Ami Je Ke Tomar | | | |
| 2004 | Prohor | | | |
| 2004 | Sagar Kinare | | Shared screen with Rituparna Sengupta | |
| 2004 | Satabdir Galpo | | | |
| 2004 | Waarish | | | |
| 2005 | Debi | | Cameo | |
| 2005 | Teesta | Teesta | | |
| 2005 | Yuddho | Sandhya Roy | | |
| 2006 | Abhimanyu | Nandini Sinha | | |
| 2006 | Je Jon Thake Majhkhane | | | |
| 2006 | Manush Bhut | | | |
| 2006 | MLA Fatakeshto | Nandini Chatterjee | | |
| 2007 | Dus Din Pore | Minu | | |
| 2007 | Mahaguru | | | |
| 2007 | Minister Fatakeshto | | | |
| 2007 | Tiger? | | | |
| 2008 | Lal Ronger Duniya | | | |
| 2009 | Anubhab | | | |
| 2009 | Narak Guljar | | Delayed release | |
| 2009 | Pakhi | | | |
| 2009 | Rahasya | | | |
| 2010 | Antarbas | | | |
| 2010 | Shukno Lanka | | | |
| 2010 | Thikana Rajpath | | | |
| 2011 | Bhalo Meye Mando Meye | | | |
| 2011 | Ei Aranya | | | |
| 2011 | Ekdin Thik | | | |
| 2011 | Jibon Rang Berang | | | |
| 2012 | Antore Bahire | | | |
| 2012 | Life in Park Street | | | |
| 2013 | Jakhan Esechhilem | | | |
| 2013 | Antaraal | | | |
| 2013 | Swabhoomi | | | |
| 2013 | Lattoo | | | |
| 2013 | Tobu Mone Rekho | | | |
| 2014 | 10th July | | Cameo | |
| 2017 | Hothat Dekha | | | |
| 2024 | Shastri | Sarala | | |
| TBA | Jonmodin † | | | |
| TBA | Tumi Ki Sei † | | | |

== Mahalaya ==
| Year | Title | Role | Network | Note | Ref. |
|---|---|---|---|---|---|
| 2008 | Mahishasurmardini | Durga | Colors Bangla | | |
| 2012 | Mahishasurmardini | Durga | Colors Bangla | | |

== Bengali TV series ==
Key
| † | Denotes films that have not yet been released |

| Year | Title | Role | Network | Note | Ref. |
|---|---|---|---|---|---|
| 1989 | Dena Paona | Shoroshee | Doordarshan | | |
| 1992 | Nagarpare Roopnagar | Jyotirani | Doordarshan | | |
| 1994 | Phire Elam | | Doordarshan | | |
| 1995 | Louhakapat | Kuti Bibi | Doordarshan | | |
| 1995 | Biraj Bou | Biraj | Doordarshan | | |
| 1995 | Ratnadip | | Doordarshan | | |
| 2021–2022 | Sarbojaya | Sarbojaya Chowdhury | Zee Bangla | | |
| 2024 | Chemistry Mashi | Sucharita Lahiri | Hoi Choi | | |

== Odia film ==
| Year | Title | Role | Notes | Ref. |
|---|---|---|---|---|
| 1989 | Topaye Sindura Dipata Shankha | | | |
| 1992 | Baadshah | | | |
| 1995 | Jivana Dhara | | | |
| 1998 | Kiye Para Kiye Nijara | | | |

== Reality show ==
| Year | Show | Season | Role | Channel | Ref. |
|---|---|---|---|---|---|
| 2013 | Didi No. 1 | 5 | Anchor | Zee Bangla | |
