= Debashree Roy =

Indian actress, dancer, choreographer and animal rights activist

- Debashree Roy in 2009

Member of West Bengal Legislative Assembly
- In office 2011–2021
- Preceded by: Kanti Ganguly
- Succeeded by: Aloke Jaldata
- Constituency: Raidighi

Personal details
- Party: Trinamool Congress (2011 – March 2021)
- Born: Chumki Roy; 8 August 1962 (age 64); Calcutta, West Bengal, India
- Other name: Kolkatar rosogolla
- Education: Park English School
- Occupations: Actress; dancer; choreographer; politician
- Years active: 1966–present
- Organization: Debasree Roy Foundation
- Works: Full list
- Spouse: Prosenjit Chatterjee (m. 1994; div. 1995)
- Relatives: Ram Mukherjee (brother-in-law); Rani Mukerjee (niece)
- Awards: National Award; BFJA Awards; Kalakar Awards; Anandalok Award

Notes
- In the films at her early age she was credited as "Chumki Roy" and then "Rumki Roy". The name "Debashree Roy" was later given by Tarun Majumdar.; She refused offers to play lead opposite Prosenjit Chatterjee since their conjugal separation in 1995, leaving an ample scope to her contemporary Rituparna Sengupta and Satabdi Roy.

Debashree Roy (born 8 August 1962), also known as Debasree Roy, is an Indian actress, dancer, choreographer, politician and animal rights activist. She was a bankable star of Bengali cinema during the 1980s, 1990s and early 2000s. She has received more than forty awards including a National Award, three BFJA Awards, five Kalakar Awards and an Anandalok Award. As a dancer, she is known for her stage adaptations of the various forms of Indian folk dances as well as her innovative dance forms imbued with elements from Indian classical, tribal and folk dance. She runs Natraj dance troupe. She is the founder of Debasree Roy Foundation, a non-profit organisation that works for the cause of stray animals. Roy was a Member of the Legislative Assembly from Raidighi constituency from 2011 till 2021.

Her first acting assignment was Hiranmoy Sen's Bengali devotional film Pagal Thakur (1966) where she was cast as an infant Ramakrishna Paramhansa. Her first leading role in Bengali cinema came with Arabinda Mukhopadhyay's film Nadi Theke Sagare (1978). (Note: Her Malayalam movie Ee Ganam Marakkumo (1978) opposite Prem Nazir was released before Nadi Theke Sagare.) She shot to wider recognition for her role in Aparna Sen's National Award winning directorial debut 36 Chowringhee Lane (1981) and Kanak Mishra's Jiyo To Aise Jiyo (1981) under Rajshri Productions. She also appeared in several other Hindi films such as Bura Aadmi (1982), Justice Chaudhury (1983), Phulwari (1984), Kabhie Ajnabi The (1985), Seepeeyan (1986) and Pyar Ka Sawan (1989). After her Bengali film Troyee (1982) became a major success at box office, she concentrated more in Bengali cinema. Her other major hits at the box office include films such as Bhalobasa Bhalobasa (1985), Lalmahal (1986), Chokher Aloy (1989), Jhankar (1989), Ahankar (1991) and Yuddha (2005) to name a few.

Roy was conferred with BFJA Award for Best Actress (1992) for the first time for her performance in Indar Sen's Bengali film Thikana (1991). She was conferred with the National Film Award for Best Actress (1995) as well as BFJA Award for Best Actress (1997) for her role in Rituparno Ghosh's National Award winning Bengali film Unishe April (1994). She collaborated with Rituparno Ghosh for the second time in his National Award winning Bengali film Asukh (1999) which once again earned her the BFJA Award for Best Actress (2000). She was also critically acclaimed for her performances in films such as Anutap (1992), Sandhyatara (1994), Kaal Sandhya (1997), Prohor (2002) and Shilpantar (2004).

== Family and educational background ==
Roy was born and brought up in a Bengali family in Kolkata. Her father Birendra Kishore Roy was an employee at West Bengal Finance Corporation. Her mother Arati Roy was the principal of Sai Natraj Shikshayatan. She is the youngest and sixth child after Purnima Lahiri, Krishna Mukherjee, Ramendra Kishore Roy, Mrigen Roy and Tanushree Bhattacharya. Purnima Lahiri, her eldest sister is a former hair stylist. Her second eldest sister Krishna Mukherjee is a former playback singer and wife of filmmaker, Ram Mukherjee. They are the parents of actress Rani Mukerji. Her deceased brother Ramendra Kishore Roy was a cinematographer of South Indian cinema. Mrigen Roy is an event manager and executive producer of Bengali cinema. Her sister Tanushree Bhattacharya, popularly known as Jhumki Roy was an actress of Bengali cinema and a playback singer. She was married to director Sanjay Bhattacharya. Initially, she took her dancing lessons from her mother, her eldest sister and then Bandana Sen. later on, she was trained by Kelucharan Mahapatra.

== Acting career ==
=== Early career as a child artist (1966—1972) ===
Roy was an infant when she was introduced to cinema. Her mother Arati Roy was a student of Shyamal Mitra and was thus well- acquainted with a number of music composers and filmmakers of Bengali cinema. She was cast in the role of an infant Ramkrishna Paramhansa in Hiranmoy Sen's devotional film Pagal Thakur (1966) alongside Chhaya Devi playing Chandramani Devi, mother of Ramakrishna. She was credited as "Kumari Chumki" (Note: "Kumari" is a Bengali term that refers to an unmarried girl. The term is used as a title for a juvenile girl.) in the film. She was noted for the first time for her role in Hiranmoy Sen's another devotional film Balak Gadadhar (1969), her second film assignment where she was once again cast as a young Ramkrishna Paramhansa. Hiranmoy Sen also zeroed in on her to play the role of Devi Kanya Kumari in the film. During this time Tarun Majumdar was looking for a pretty but expressive little face for the role of Ranu in his new Thriller Kuheli (1971). Chhaya Devi who was also a part of that venture suggested Chumki's name for that role. She was cast alongside veterans like Biswajit Chatterjee and Sandhya Roy in the film. Roy portrayed Ranu who, every night, stealthily goes out to meet a mysterious woman whom she believes to be her mother. The film was a prominent success at box office and Chumki became a starlet. She featured in Sipayi Ramu (1972).

=== Profusion of roles (1976—2007) ===
Following the success of Kuheli (1971), Tarun Majumdar gave his word that he would introduce Roy as a leading actress when she hit her teens. Hence Arati Roy, her mother refused to let Roy play any other supporting roles in order to retain her daughter's exclusivity. In 1975 Roy was finally summoned for the title role in Majumdar's Balika Badhu. The film was the Hindi remake of his 1967 Bengali film Balika Badhu (1967). After she appeared for a look test, Majumdar changed his mind considering her imperfect for this role and she got replaced by Rajni Sharma. An upset Roy, then accepted a role in Sushil Mukherjee's Bengali drama Sudur Niharika (1976) where she was credited as "Rumki Roy". She, then featured in Kushali Goshthi's Aguner Phulki (1978) alongside veterans like Anil Chatterjee and Sabitri Chatterjee. During this time Arabinda Mukhopadhyay was looking for a young actress for the female lead opposite Mithun Chakraborty in Nadi Theke Sagare (1978). Sandhya Roy who played the other female lead in the film suggested the director to cast Roy in the lead opposite Chakraborty. As described by the director, the film narrates the ebb and flow of the life of two unfathered individuals played by Roy and Chakraborty. Roy played Champa, the unfathered daughter to Sandhya Roy. Upon its release, the film received favourable review. Roy was critically appreciated for her gaze in the film. She had to enact the adolescence as well as the adulthood of the character she was given. A perfectionist, director Arabinda Mukhopadhyay wanted her gaze to be mature enough for the adult role while practically, she was not an adult at that time. To shed off her juvenile, impulsive look, He instructed her not to undergo any conversation or any kind of playful activity for a long time before shooting. The film was a major success at box office. She then featured opposite Anil Dhawan in Kuldeep Pandey's Hindi film Ghata (1978). The film won critical favour but failed to create any ripple at box office. She acted opposite Prem Nazir in N. Sankaran Nair's Malayalam film Ee Ganam Marakkumo (1978) where she was credited as "Rugmini Roy". The film was a major failure at box office.

She, then featured in Nirmal Sarbanga's road film G. T. Road (1980). The film did not perform well at box office. During this time Tarun Majumdar came up with the offer for his romantic drama film Dadar Kirti (1980) and suggested to change her name into "Debashree Roy". Her mother never objected to it. She was cast alongside Sandhya Roy, Kali Banerjee, Ruma Guha Thakurta, Tapas Paul and Mahua Roychoudhury in the film. She portrayed the character of Bini, the innocent sibling of Saraswati portrayed by Mahua Roychoudhury. The film became a remarkable box office success and her role and vibrant appearance was loved by the audience, alongside the reverse and solemn appearance of Mahua Roychoudhury.

She was again cast in the role of the chirpy sibling of Mahua Roychoudhury in Manu Sen's blockbuster Bengali film Subarnagolak (1981). She featured in Dilip Mukherjee's Bengali film Father (1981) alongside Soumitra Chatterjee, Ranjit Mallick, Haradhan Banerjee, Sumitra Mukherjee, Mithu Mukherjee and Mahua Roychoudhury. After Moon Moon Sen declined the role of Nandita, Aparna Sen proposed Roy to play the part in her directorial debut 36 Chowringhee Lane (1981). Nandita along with her boyfriend Samaresh exploits her former teacher's apartment for making love to each other. She was initially hesitant to do the love-making scene with Dhritiman Chatterjee who played Samaresh. The film was a major failure at box office, still Roy was applauded by media personalities due to her good looks and unlaboured screen presence. She, then appeared in Kanak Mishra's Hindi film Jiyo To Aise Jiyo (1981), under Rajshri Productions. She played Vidya, the love interest of Kundan played by Arun Govil. The film became a jubilee hit at box office. The next year, she appeared in Desh Gautam's Bura Aadmi (1980) which was a major box office debacle. In 1982, she appeared in Tarun Majumdar's Bengali film Meghmukti. The same year, she featured opposite Mithun Chakraborty in Goutam Mukherjee's love triangle Troyee which became a major success at box office. Aparupa, her another release of the same year was a flop at the box office.

Roy featured opposite Tapas Paul in Bijoy Bose's Bengali drama Samapti (1983). She featured in K. Raghavendra Rao's multistarrer Hindi film Justice Chaudhury (1983) alongside Jeetendra, Hema Malini, Moushumi Chatterjee, Sridevi and Raj Kiran. The film was a major success at box office.

In 1984, she appeared in Mukul Dutt's Hindi film Phulwari, under Rajshri Productions. In the film, Roy portrayed the character of Lali, a beautiful, conceited and pampered girl who insults her boyfriend Rajiv on the day of their engagement and discloses to everyone present at her engagement party that she has given consent to marry him because she wanted to avenge an earlier incident when he humiliated her in front of the public. She was paired with Shashi Puri in this film. She featured alongside Kanowaljit Singh and Om Puri in Akash Jain's film Seepeeyan (1984), where she portrayed the role of a beautiful woman who flings herself into water after her boyfriend refused to marry her and is saved by another man whom she later marries. In 1984, she was cast in the role of Kundanadinee in Ajay Kar's Bengali period film Bishabriksha, based on the veteran Bengali novelist Bankim Chandra Chattopadhyay's novel of the same name. She then, featured in Dipranjan Bose's Bengali drama film Parabat Priya (1984), alongside Tapas Paul and Mahua Roychoudhury. The film was a major success at the box office. She played the character of Piyali, a highly pampered girl who decides to poison a glass of milk that her husband was supposed to take.

In 1985, she was paired with Sandeep Patil in Kabhi Ajnabi The (1985), directed and produced by Vijay Singh. She played the character of Geeta, who decides to sacrifice her love for the sake another woman who had previously been her boyfriend's ladylove. The film was over-hyped regarding the Bollywood debut of Sandeep Patil and Roy's sensuous enacting with him in the song sequence Geet Mere Hothon Ko De Gaya Koi. Filmfare wrote: "With those kohl eyes and her figure scantily covered with, she looked enthralling, yet she looked coy enough." Her performance in this film earned her the Calcutta and National Unity Award for Best Supporting Actress in Hindi Cinema. The film theatrically opened with 80% seat occupancy, but ultimately proved itself to be a major commercial failure due to its poor screenplay. In 1985, she was cast opposite Tapas Paul in Tarun Majumdar's romantic drama Bhalobasa Bhalobasa. This film established Roy's pairing with Tapas Paul as the leading on-screen pairing of the nineteen eighties. Her other major hits with Paul are Uttar Lipi (1986), Arpan (1987), Shankhachur (1988), Surer Sathi (1988), Surer Akashe (1988), Nayanmani (1989), Chokher Aloy (1989), Shubha Kamana (1991), Mayabini (1992), Phire Paoa (1993), Tobu Mone Rekho (1994) and Putrabadhu (1998).

Roy also delivered hits with Prosenjit Chatterjee and Chiranjeet Chakraborty. She was paired with Chiranjeet Chakraborty for the first time in Madhumoy (1986), which also stars Prosenjit Chatterjee and Mahua Roychoudhury. Her pairing with Chakraborty conveyed major hits such as Mouna Mukhar (1987), Heerer Shikal (1988), Papi (1990), Tomar Rakte Amar Sohag (1993), Bhoy (1996), Beyadap (1996), Jiban Jouban (1997), Joddha (1987) and Debanjali (2000).

In 1988, she appeared as Satyavati in B.R.Chopra's Mahabharat.

In 1987, she was paired with Prosenjit Chatterjee in Bimal Ray's Samrat O Sundari. The film was a hit and gave acknowledgement to Roy's pairing with Prosenjit Chatterjee as a bankable one. Her other hits with Chatterjee are Ora Charjon (1988), Jhankar (1989), Ahankar (1991), Raktelekha (1992), Purushottam (1992), Rakter Swad (1993), Shraddhanjali (1993) and Nati Binodini (1994). Srikanta Guhathakurata's Ahankar (1991) opened with 90% seat occupancy and grossed more than ₹1 crore at the box office. Roy further received critical acclaim in her role in the Drama Anutap (1992) which was directed by Prabhat Roy as well as rave reviews for her performance in Thikana for which she won her first BFJA Award for Best Actress . She featured in Rakte Lekha (1992) where the number Ami Kolkatar Rosogolla became very popular. Following the success of the film, she earned the sobriquet, Kolkatar rosogolla. Roy was paired with Chatterjee for the last time in Rituparno Ghosh's much acclaimed film Unishe April (1994). Roy essayed the role of Aditi, who decides to commit suicide after her boyfriend refused her to marry, but gets interrupted by her mother. India Today described her performance as an "inspired performance by Roy, who has so far been mired in Bengali commercial cinema." Filmfare appreciated her performance. The film won her the National Film Award for Best Actress category. She also garnered critical acclaim for her roles in Sandhyatara (1994) and Cinemay Jeman Hoy (1994).

After Roy separated from Chatterjee, she refused to play any female lead opposite the actor. Which in turn leaves an ample scope to her two strong rivals Rituparna Sengupta and Satabdi Roy who became choices opposite Chatterjee in most of his films in the late 1990s. Chiranjeet Chakraborty chose her for the female lead of his directorial venture Bhoy (1996). The film is inspired by Sleeping with the Enemy (1991). In 1997, Roy had two releases opposite Chiranjeet Chakraborty – Prabhat Roy's Jiban Jouban and Dulal Bhowmik's Yoddha both of which were commercially successful. She gave birth to speculation and controversy for her role as Tishyarakshita in Nitish Roy's Samarpan aired on Zee Tv.

She portrayed the role of Sarada Devi in Swami Vivekananda (1998). She appeared in Tapan Sinha's Bengali film Ajab Ganyer Ajab Katha (1998), under the banner of Shree Venkatesh Films. She appeared in a cameo role in Tapan Sinha's Hindi film Daughters of This Century (1999). In 1999, she appeared in Rituparno Ghosh's Asukh, landing the character of Rohini Choudhury, an actress who is suspicious by nature and begins to suspect her father to be an HIV positive due to some illegitimate relation she is not aware of.

When I heard of this role, my first reaction was "Yes, this is my role." What helped me flesh out the character was the closeness I discovered between Rohini and myself. The lowest common denominator between us is the element of loneliness, the feeling of isolation and alienation every actress experiences as part of her life. Each of us lives in an island, in our own space, where we are completely, totally alone, ...

— Debashree Roy on what made her give her nod to Rituparno Ghosh's Asukh (in an interview with Rediff.com)

The film became a commercial as well as a major critical success. It won her Bengal Film Journalists' Association – Best Actress Award in 2000.

In 2000, Roy appeared in Debanjali which was debacle at box office.

She appeared in Subrata Sen's Ek Je Achhe Kanya (2001), which was major commercial success. She was paired with Sabyasachi Chakrabarty in this film. She appeared in Goutam Ghose's much acclaimed Bengali film Dekha (2001), alongside Soumitra Chatterjee. She featured in Prashant Bal's Hindustani Sipahi (2002). In 2002, she appeared in Bappaditya Bandopadhyay's much acclaimed film Shilpantar. She played the character of a woman who works in a circus and draws masses by her act of eating raw live snakes or hens. In the same year, she played the character of Kadambari Devi in Sukanta Ray's film Chhelebela, alongside Jisshu Sengupta playing Rabindranath Tagore.

Kadambari for me is a challenge . . . . this role is a different challenge. It is a period film based on real life incidents and characters. The role demands that I remain conscious of my makeup, costume, dialogue delivery, body language etc. Yet act naturally. Because I have to pretend that I belong to a Bengal of a bygone era. Kadambari is famous in Bengal's cultural and literary history. I cannot take too many liberties with the external aspects of the character. I am confident that with the hard work I put in and the good wishes of my mentors and fans, I will certainly live up to the expectations of my audience with my enactment of Kadambari.

— Roy on her role as Kadambari Devi in Sukanta Roy's Chhelebela

Shantimoy Bandopadhyay chose Roy to play the title role in Mejdidi (2003) based on Sarat Chandra Chatterjee's story of the same name. She portrayed Hemangini, who shelters an orphan who is severely exploited by his stepsister. The film endorsed altruism. The film failed to receive favourable reviews from critics but performed well at the box office.

She featured in Subhadro Chowdhury's National Award winning film Prohor, where she played the protagonist Nandita, who donates her blood for a man who raped her earlier.

Roy featured as the titular protagonist in Bratya Basu's Teesta (2005). It is inspired by Basu's play Mukhomukhi Bosibar. She portrayed Teesta who fails to communicate with the world of people and finds solace in nature. Though the film became a critical and commercial failure, she won critical favour for her performance. It earns her Anandalok Award for Best Actress in 2005. She had a series of flops such as Satabdir Golpo (2004), Sagar Kinare (2004), Ami Je Ke Tomar (2004) and Teesta (2005). She featured opposite Mithun Chakrabarty in Ravi Kinagi's Yuddho (2005). The film was released with 41 prints across West Bengal. It grossed ₹1.2 crore in the first week and grossed ₹ 3 crore overall. She then featured in MLA Fatakesto (2006) and Mahaguru (2007). She featured in Je Jon Thake Majhkhane (2006).

She made her small screen debut in Soumitra Chatterjee starrer Bengali tv series Dena Paona. Her other famous roles from Bengali TV series are that of Louhakapat, Nagarpare Roopnagar and Biraj Bou to name few.

Roy choreographed most of her dance numbers in Bengali films. Her dance to the popular song Ami Kolkatar Rosogolla from Raktelekha (1992) was accredited as the biggest factor for the film achieving an enormous success at box office. Several of her other memorable choreographies includes her dance numbers such as Aar Koto Raat Eka Thakbo from Chokher Aloy (1989), Baje Dhol Tak Dhina Dhin from Aakrosh (1989) and Bajlo Je Ghungru from Jhankar (1989).

=== Setback (2008–2011) ===
From 2008, Roy made some impolitic choices of selecting films that did not equalise her stature and led her career into a major setback. She featured in Nilanjan Bhattacharya's directorial debut Lal Ronger Duniya (2008) where she played Dalia Karmakar, a former sex worker who tries save the women who are entangled in their lives of prostitution. The film is based on Lal Ronger Prithibi, a Bengali novel by Rupak Saha. It emerged as a major critical and commercial failure. The Telegraph stated that the film failed to stand up for too many characters. The dialogues never won any critical favour as well. Roy was appreciated for her performance. The Indian Express wrote, "Debasree Roy as Dalia gives one of her best performances in recent times". It ran for two weeks and was then withdrawn.

She then featured in Tapas Chandra's Anubhav (2009). The film is based on a short story by Dibyendu Palit. She plays Purnima who tries to rescue the women mired in the profession of prostitution. The film became a box office debacle. She was appreciated for her performance in Goutam Sen's Bengali feature film Pakhi (2009). The Times of India wrote, "Debasree Roy gives a stellar performance with her act of a blind girl." The Telegraph wrote, "Debasree stands out as a sensitive, vulnerable woman who secretly nurses a sense of betrayal." The film failed to create any ripples at the box office. She featured in Rahasya — The Bhoutik. The film was a major critical failure.

She featured in Suhasish Mukherjee's drama Antarbas (2010). The film was both critically and commercially unsuccessful. She also featured in Gaurav Pandey's Shukno Lanka (2010) which was a critical and commercial success. She portrayed the character of a loving woman whose husband is indifferent to her. The film was publicised on her dance to the popular number Sundari Kamala. She featured in Thikana Rajpath (2010) directed by Kanoj Das. She played Padma who is insisted by Manisha played by Indrani Halder to surrogate for the latter but left in lurch when Manisha becomes pregnant. Roy's performance in the film was appreciated by critics. The film was a moderate grosser at box office.

In 2011, Roy had four releases – Bhalo Meye Mondo Meye, Ei Aranya, Ekdin Thik and Jibon Rang Berang. She featured as Siddha in Nirmalya Banerjee's Ekdin Thik (2011). The film revolves around the protagonist Nikhilesh who gets to know that he has won a prestigious award not for the merit of his literary performance but his father's influence.

During an interview conducted by Ei Samay newspaper in May 2021, she was asked why she was missing from the silver screen even though a number of good films had been being made. She stated that she is not favourite of any producer or any director who prefers to cast in all his films some other actors who are his favourites.

=== Further Roles (2012–2017) ===
She featured in Antare Bahire (2012), and Life in Park Street (2012). Both the films met debacle at box office.

In 2013, Roy featured in a role of a gynaecologist in Benoy Mittra's Antaraal. When Mittra narrated the plot to her, she loved the plot as well as her character. She was up on her feet regarding the promotion of the film. The film met critical as well as commercial success. Times of India wrote, "After a long time Debasree seems to have taken a genuine interest both in the plot and her character." Her next turn was Ujjal Chatterjee's Swabhoomi (2013) which was based on Mahasweta Devi's novel Adhaba. She portrayed Saraswati whose husband goes missing. The film turned out to be a major critical as well as commercial failure. Her two other releases of that year were Sukanta Roy's Jakhan Esechhilem (2013) and Ashis Roy's Lattoo (2013) both of which became major critical as well as commercial failures.

After a brief hiatus Roy accepted a role in Reshmi Mitra's Indo-Bangladesh collaboration Hothat Dekha (2017). She had to share her screen with Ilias Kanchan who she described as a delight to work with. Based on the poem of the same name by Tagore, the film narrates the story of two estranged lovers who, coincidentally meet on a journey by a train after a long time. The film was shot in Chittagong.

=== Comeback (2021—present) ===
She was slated to be seen in Anup Sengupta's new venture Tumi Ki Sei. But the film did not happen. In January 2021, there arises a speculation in media that she would feature opposite Prosenjit Chatterjee in a film by Nandita Roy and Shiboprosad Mukherjee. She later changed her mind and refused to star opposite Chatterjee. After she quit politics, she was offered the title role in Sarbojaya, a Bengali TV series directed by Snehashish Chakraborty. She portrays a woman who has sacrificed all her longing for the sake of her in-laws. Once the promo of the TV series was released, netizens started to compare the TV series to the Indrani Halder starrer TV series Sreemoyee. She received backlash from a part of netizens who claimed that she had lost all her charm and splendour to portray a female lead. Once broadcast, the series grasped the 3rd position in TRP having attained 8.5 rating point. Though she faces strong rivalry from young actresses such as Soumitrisha Kundu, Shweta Bhattacharya and Susmita Dey, she manages to retain her position in the top ten bracket. In 5th week of 2022, the series lost its position in the top ten countdown. She gives her nod to Sourav Chakraborty's Bengali web series Chemistry Mashi. She portrays Sucharita Lahiri, a YouTuber who explains chemistry through cooking.

== Dance career ==
Roy's mother, initially, wanted Roy to become a dancer. She alongside her sister Tanushree Bhattacharya, made a career in dance at a very young age after she became popular for her role in Balak Gadadhar (1969). Barin Dhar, a famous impresario at that time named her "Rumki" and her sister Tanushree "Jhumki". She was trained in Odissi by Kelucharan Mohapatra. In 1991, she formed her troupe Natraj. In 1991, she was hailed for Vasavdatta, a production by Natraj. It was a dance-drama where she translated classical Indian dance forms and their iconography into a solemn contemporary dance movements. It was based on Abhisar, a poem by Rabindranath Tagore. She enacted the role of Vasabdatta, a celebrated courtesan who meets a young mendicant on her way and pleads him to accept her hospitality at her home. The mendicant assures her that he will accept only when the right time will come. Later, Vasavdatta is banished and left alone outside of her city as she has contracted a contagious disease. The mendicant comes, takes her into his arms and says that the time has come. Roy was careful enough regarding the sobriety and delicacy while rehearsing it. Vasavdatta got full seat occupancy every time it was staged.

Roy was exposed to Indian folk dances as well by Kelucharan Mohapatra and took a keen and sincere interest to adapt them on stage. She ventured into an attempt to manifest the forms of folk dances of Bengal in Swapner Sandhane, the much acclaimed production of Natraj. She was most applauded for her wider attempt to present the various forms of Indian folk dance in Bichitro, the first abroad production of Natraj. The project was critically acclaimed in western media. It was regarded as a valuable workshop on south-eastern Asian culture by Pariscope. Bhashyo wrote: "She created a jugglery with those rapid change in posture and movement."

Indian folk dance has never been so glamorous before she conglomerated almost all the native dance forms of Indian subcontinent and at the same time it was marvellous to watch one of the biggest pop icons of East Indian cinema, in the manifestation of our folks. She mesmerized with her verve. She created a jugglery with the rapid change in posture and movement especially in the north-eastern Indian sequence and the spectators were bewitched and awe-struck. She has really been a sincere observer and lover of Indian heritage. She has that probing Indian mind that keeps searching and researching on what the modern, cultural outcome has descended from or the overlooked factors of our heritage.

— An extract from the review on Bichitro by Bhashyo (August, 1996 ed.)

Roy had an interrupted dance career due to her commitment to film industry. She was always in a dilemma regarding which to focus primarily on between dance and film. After the major success of Bichitro, Roy was persuaded by some of her close ones to pay priority to her dance over her film career as she was regarded as much more excellent as a dancer than an actress. As Roy was, at that time, the most bankable female star of Bengali cinema, directors and producers did not want her to focus less on her film career. Besides, Roy was getting offered to essay a lot of substantial roles and she did not want to refuse them for the sake of her stage career.

In 1998, Subarna Bharati was staged for the first time. The production glorified amelioration of India since Independence till Kargil war. The Telegraph wrote that the show upheld rich multicultural heritage of India. Later on, she ventured into Fusion art and collaborated with Taaltantra in some of their tours. She rendered the nine moods of Bharata Muni's Natya Shastra in Navaras, where she exhibited an innovative dance form imbued with elements from Indian classical, tribal and folk dance. She has been acclaimed for her vigour while dancing and to sustain this she has always been careful enough regarding the selection of the colour for her costumes, which ranged from tint, tone and shade to exotic ones. She was also acclaimed for her use of mirrors and curtains on stage, which she claimed to have been used to vivify her presentation.

== Political career ==
Roy, as a Member of the Legislative Assembly from Trinamool Congress, successfully contested the West Bengal assembly elections 2011 and 2016. She won against the CPI(M) candidate and former minister Kanti Ganguly from the Raidighi constituency.

On 15 March 2021, she quit TMC after being denied a ticket for the upcoming West Bengal legislative election.

== Animal rights activity ==
"Man, Nature and the animal world are inextricably linked. One cannot survive without the other. We must treat our animals with compassion. We must co-exist with them as they are our friends."

— Debashree Roy during an interview conducted by The Hindu

Roy is the founder of Debasree Roy Foundation, an NGO which works for the welfare of the stray animals. The object of this NGO is to set up a good relation between mankind and animals. It also enlightens people about the various steps that one can take to prevent animal cruelty and take ample care of the animals. It also organises vaccination camps in different locations of Kolkata. Eminent veterinary professionals are assigned to preside over these camps. She gave her backing to Humane Society International's campaign against testing cosmetics on animals.

== Personal life ==
In 1983, Roy met Sandeep Patil on the set of Kabhie Ajnabi The and reportedly an affair followed between her and the cricketer who was married at that time. She was rumoured to be the sole reason for the failure of Patil's first marriage. She claimed that she was a good friend to Patil and nothing beyond that. She filed a lawsuit against an article about her, published in the September 1983 edition of Stardust magazine since the article claimed that she was married to Patil. In 1985, soon after the release of Kabhie Ajnabi The, they discontinued their relationship and never publicly discussed anything about their separation.

In 1994, Roy married Prosenjit Chatterjee and they separated in 1995. Her mother wanted her to marry Amit Kumar.

"I don't know when and how Chumki (Debasree Roy) and I fell in love. Ma and Chumki's mom were best of friends and Chumki, Maku (Pallavi Chatterjee) and I were best buddies since childhood. Ma would always say that Chumki would be my wife one day. But I can vouch for the fact that not even for a day did Chumki and I go out or even watch a film together. We didn't date. Suddenly, one day, Chumki came to my flat and said, 'I want to marry you'. Huh! She said, 'I've left my house and you have to marry me, right now'. At that moment I felt like I was some Prithviraj Chauhan! On top of the world! I was a big star then and I agreed and we tied the knot. Everything was going fine and then one day Chumki left me."

— Prosenjit Chatterjee on his equation with Debashree Roy during an interview conducted by The Telegraph

During an interview conducted by The Telegraph, Prosenjit Chatterjee said that Roy had been one of his close friends since childhood; he also said that it was actually Roy who proposed to get married and decided to separate. Insiders from Bengali film industry claimed that Chatterjee wanted her to quit her acting career and pursue maternity. Roy could not accept his suggestion to quit her acting career since she was at the peak of her career at that time. Roy claimed that Chatterjee was professionally jealous of her.

At that time my marriage to Prosenjit was going through a bad patch. Nothing I did could make him happy. Our relationship was never like a husband-wife relationship should be – where the two compromise and adjust. I did try to adjust, but my efforts were of no avail as Bumba did neither. I know that he'd have been happy if I gave up acting altogether and became a housewife. But that was something I didn't want to do and he knew it even before he married me. Anyway I had virtually stopped acting during that period because my domestic life was in such a mess. Bumba was very insecure of my success. He was professionally jealous of me. I think his ego, his jealousy and his inferiority complex worked in his mind against me. To him I was the actress Debasree Roy and not his wife Chumki.

— Roy on her relationship with Prosenjit Chatterjee (in an interview conducted by The Telegraph)

She is the maternal aunt of Bollywood actress Rani Mukerji.

In February 2021, she filed a defamation case at Alipore Court, against Sovan Chatterjee and Baishakhi Banerjee who claimed that Roy deceived the people of Raidighi constituency.

== Awards and nominations ==
Award	Year	Category	Work	Result	Ref.
National Film Award	1995	Best Actress	Unishe April	Won	
Banga Bibhushan	2014	Contribution in Cinema		Won	
Bengal Film Journalists' Association Awards	1992	Best Actress	Thikana	Won	
Bengal Film Journalists' Association Awards	1997	Best Actress	Unishe April	Won	
Bengal Film Journalists' Association Awards	2000	Best Actress	Asukh	Won	
Anandalok Puraskar	1999	Best Actress	Daho	Nominated	
Anandalok Puraskar	2000	Best Actress	Asukh	Nominated	
Anandalok Puraskar	2001	Best Supporting Actress	Ek Je Ache Kanya	Nominated	
Anandalok Puraskar	2005	Best Actress	Teesta	Won	
Kalakar Awards	1993	Best Actress	Prem	Won	
Kalakar Awards	1994	Best Actress	Sandhyatara	Won	
Kalakar Awards	1996	Best Actress (Television)	Louhakapat	Won	
Kalakar Awards	2002	Best Actress	Dekha	Won	
Kalakar Awards	2003	Best Actress	Shilpantar	Won	
Aajkaal Television Award	1990	Best Actress	Dena Paona	Nominated	
Bharat Nirman Awards	1999	Contribution in Film and Television		Won	

== Discography ==
Year	Album	Language	No.	Song	Ref.
	Durga Maa Elo Ghare	Bengali	1.	Mon Diyechi Mon Niyechi	
	Durga Maa Elo Ghare	Bengali	2.	Durga Maa Elo Ghare	
	Durga Maa Elo Ghare	Bengali	3.	Ghure Ghure Bone Bone	
	Durga Maa Elo Ghare	Bengali	4.	Chhi Chhi Ki Bolley	
	Durga Maa Elo Ghare	Bengali	5.	Jai Jadi Jak	
	Durga Maa Elo Ghare	Bengali	6.	Andhare Deep Keno Jalo Je	
	Shon Shon Mor Gaan	Bengali			
