= Unishe April =

1994 film by Rituparno Ghosh

- Theatrical Poster
- Directed by: Rituparno Ghosh
- Written by: Rituparno Ghosh
- Produced by: Renu Roy
- Starring: Aparna Sen; Debashree Roy; Prosenjit Chatterjee; Boddhiswatta Majumdar; Deepankar De
- Cinematography: Sunirmal Mazumdar
- Music by: Jyotishka Dasgupta
- Production company: Spandan Films
- Release date: 1994
- Running time: 138 mins
- Country: India
- Language: Bengali
- Budget: est. ₹20 lakh

Unishe April (Bengali pronunciation: [u̯niʃe epril], transl. April 19) is a 1994 Indian Bengali-language drama film directed by Rituparno Ghosh and produced by Renu Roy under the banner of Spandan Films. It stars Aparna Sen, Debashree Roy, Prosenjit Chatterjee, Boddhiswatta Majumdar and Deepankar De. The music of the film was composed by Jyotishka Dasgupta.

Unishe April marked Ghosh's second directorial venture after Hirer Angti (1992). A loose remake of Ingmar Bergman's film Autumn Sonata (1978), it opened to widespread acclaim, with critical praise drawn towards the screenplay and performances by the lead actors—especially that of Sen and Roy, the latter eventually winning the National film Award for Best Actress. Ghosh, besides directing the film, also wrote the screenplay while the cinematography was handled by Sunirmal Mazumdar.

The film's narrative revolves around the tensed relationship between a woman who is an uninvolved parent and her daughter, depicting how their inter-personal matters lead to a bitter aspect of life. Considered way ahead of its time, the huge success of the film was instrumental in ending the era of action films in Bengali film industry and rejuvenating the genre of art films. Roy's award-winning performance further consolidated her position as the 'undisputed queen of Bengali cinema'. At the 42nd National Film Awards, it won Best Feature Film and was nominated for the New Currents Award at the Busan International Film Festival of 1996.

== Plot ==
Sarojini (Aparna Sen) is a well-known dancer, whose immense dedication to her art permeates every aspect of her life. While honor and acclaim make way into her professional life she, is less successful on the domestic front. Her growing popularity leads to her husband Manish's (Boddhiswatta Majumdar) gradual resentment towards her and ultimately a rift between the couple. Manish takes over the upbringing of their only daughter, Aditi, as Sarojini remains busy with her artistic commitments. Sarojini seems to find a replacement for the void in her marital life through dancing, however she is unsure if her blossoming career and success is really bringing her happiness. The sudden demise of Manish forces Sarojini to put her daughter in a hostel. The glittering memory of her father and her mother's inability to give her proper time results in Aditi's bitterness towards her mother.

The film begins with Aditi's (Debashree Roy) returning home. She is now all grown up and on the verge of starting her career as a doctor, like her father. The atmosphere is thick with the sharp tension between mother and daughter. Shortly after Aditi's return, Sarojini is honored with a prestigious award. It is 19 April, Aditi's father's death anniversary, which her mother appears to have forgotten. Misunderstanding and temperamental conflicts creates an air of suffocation for both.

Aditi's prospective husband, Prosenjit Chatterjee dumps her after his family learns of her mother's profession soon after the public announcement of Sarojini's award. Heartbroken, Aditi decides to attempt suicide, which her mother finds out leading mother and daughter into a heart-to-heart conversation. Gradually they unlock two decades of rage and rancor, pain and bitterness to each other. Untold facts finally get deciphered, misunderstandings clear out. All hint to the final question: "Will Aditi ultimately be able to forgive her mother?"

== Cast ==
- Aparna Sen as Sarojini Gupta aka Babli
- Debashree Roy as Dr. Aditi Sen aka Mithu
  - Ahana Banerjee as young Mithu
- Boddhiswatta Majumdar as Manish Sen, Sarojini's deceased husband
- Prosenjit Chatterjee as Sudeep
- Chitra Sen as Bela
- Deepankar De as Somnath
- Sudeshna Roy as Ruma
- Dipannita Nag
- Tapas Tagore
- Shoubhik Mitra
- Malay Bhattacharya
- Prabir Ghosh
- Sumit Roy
- Shuchita Roychowdhury
- Konkona Sen Sharma (Cameo)

== Reception ==
S.R. Ashok Kumar of The Hindu wrote that "The film has a gripping climax which makes you to sit on the edge of the seat. Rituparno Ghosh has directed this film which has good music by Jyotishka Dasgupta and eye catching visuals are by Sunirmal Majumder."

== Legacy ==
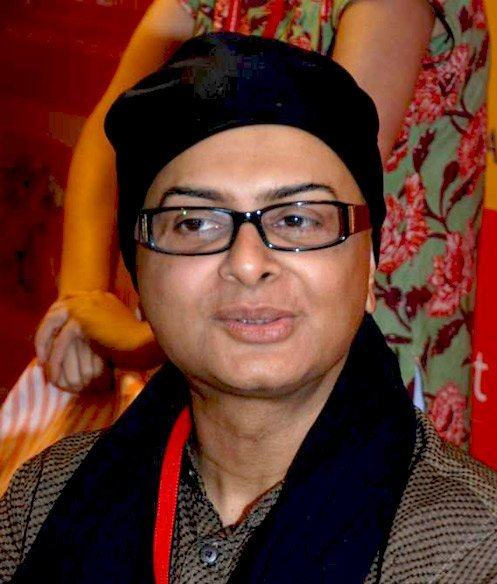
Unishe April is considered one of the best works of Ghosh as it gave him widespread reputation

Unishe April gained cult status in Bengali cinema, and has been considered as one of the most memorable works of Ghosh. Critics cited that "it changed the dynamics of Bengali cinema".

In the words of Shubhra Gupta from The Indian Express:

"Unishe April, out in 1994, was only his second feature, but he displayed in it, and continued to display in his subsequent work, a rare understanding of human nature. He was fearless when it came to emotion: he demanded that his actors strip away the layers, throw away artifice, so that when they felt pain, we felt it too".

Following its success, Ghosh came to be known as the "Heir to Satyajit Ray" as he derived from Ray's style "a subtler way of telling complex problems that plugged Bengali society" in [almost] all his films. Noted socialist Alison Macdonald hailed Unishe April to be a pertinent example of the fact that "good family relations grow from negotiation and discussion". While elaborating further, she says "Ghosh demonstrates that motherhood is not only something that needs to be worked at but that traditional expectations made of women in modern society are unrealistic in this respect." Sangeeta Dutta pinpoints that the film helped Ghosh to build his reputation among the Bengali diaspora. On 22 July 2021, Shoma. A. Chatterji has written "Through this very unusual film, Ghosh aspired to free the censored and distorted image of the screen mother from the taboos and constraints of patriarchal culture, to place it as a subject of psychological study and sociological inspiration for a feminist reading." Film-maker Goutam Ghoshe noted "the mother-daughter relationship in 'Unishe April' was refreshing, yet realistic in a society that was going through churning."

Debashree Roy, who was already a popular actress in Bengali cinema, gained critical acclaim for this film in particular. She went on to collaborate with Ghosh in his yet another venture Asukh (1999), which was too a success. The film tops the list of her Best Performances, and in one of her interviews she was quoted saying, "this character is very much different from the ones I have played till now". Talking about Sen's role in the film, The Times of India has put forth their view as, "Aparna Sen excelled in her role. Both the personality of a professional dancer and motherly love has superbly bloomed in the character Sarojini". As part of Indian Independence Day's celebration in 2016, NDTV included the film in its "70 Great Indian Films" listing. News18 considered it to be one of the "100 Greatest Indian films of all time".

== Awards ==
Award (Note: Awards, festivals and organizations are in Alphabetical order.)	Date of ceremony (Note: Date is linked to the article about the awards held that year, wherever possible.)	Category	Recipient(s)	Result	Ref.
1st Busan International Film Festival	13 September 1996	New Currents Award	Unishe April	Nominated	
42nd National Film Awards	17 July 1995	Best Feature Film	Unishe April	Won	
42nd National Film Awards	17 July 1995	Best Actress	Debashree Roy	Won	
