= Angana Bose =

Bengali theatre and film actress

- Occupation: Actress
- Known for: Shukno Lanka

Angana Bose is a Bengali theatre and film actress. She acted in the 2010 Bengali film Shukno Lanka.

== Career ==
Bose started her acting career in the Bengali theatre group Aarabdha Natya Vidyalay, which was directed by Tripti Mitra. In the play Abhigyan Shakuntalam, she acted in the role of Priyamvada. In 2010 she acted in the Bengali film Shukno Lanka opposite Mithun Chakraborty. She was also a member of the Bengali theatre group Gandhar. She acted in the lead role of Vasantasena in the Shomikkhon theatre group's play Mrichchakatika.

== Works ==
=== Films ===
- Shukno Lanka (2010)

=== Plays ===
With Aarabdha Natya Vidyalay (theatre group)

- Raktakarabi
- Abhigyan Shakuntalam
- Bish-Brikkho

With Gandhar theatre group

- Bhamma

With Shomikkhon theatre group

- Mrichchakatika
