= Kunal Mitra =

Indian actor (born 1965)

- Born: Basab Mitra; 30 April 1965; Calcutta, West Bengal, India
- Died: 21 January 2009 (aged 43); Kolkata, West Bengal, India
- Occupation: Actor
- Years active: 1994–2009
- Spouse: Ruma Mitra (m. 1992)
- Children: 2

Basab Mitra, popularly known by his stage name Kunal Mitra (Bengali: কুনাল মিত্র), was an Indian actor who appeared in Bengali films and television.

== Early life ==
Kunal Mitra was an Indian film actor who has performed in Bengali movies and TV shows. He was recognized as Councilor Janardan Jana from the famous television show Raja & Goja: Bindass Moja Zee Bangla. He played the role of councilor of Ward no. 420; his conclusive movie was Chhaw-a Chhuti. Kunal was born in Kolkata, West Bengal, India. He was married to Ruma Mitra in 1992, and they have two sons.

== Career ==
Mitra began his career in television with the comedy serial Ebar Jombe Mawja on 1994. He appeared in about 300 shows and serials, and around ten feature films. He achieved success as Councilor Janardan Jana in the popular show Raja & Goja: Bindass Moja on the Zee Bangla television channel, where he played a councilor of Ward no. 420 who performed many anti-social activities. His last film was Chhaw-a Chhuti.

== Death ==
Mitra died of a heart attack while shooting at Indrapuri Studio, Kolkata for the television serial “Utsaver Ratri.” He was survived by his wife and two sons.

== Filmography ==
- Shukno Lanka (2010)
- Raaj Bangsha (2009)
- Chha-e Chhuti (2009)
- Kaler Rakhal (2009)
- Sedin Dujone (2008)
- Lal Ronger Duniya (2008)
- Rangamati (2008)
- Krishnakanter Will (2007)
- Bibar (2006)
- Netaji Subhas Chandra Bose: The Forgotten Hero (2004)
- Alo (2003)
- Raja & Goja: Bindaas Moja (TV series)
- Sampradan (1999)
- Khelaghar (1999)
- Jahangirer Swarnamudra (1998)
- Yugant (1995)
