= Safia/Safdar =

2026 Indian Hindi-language drama film

- Directed by: Baba Azmi
- Written by: Mir Ali Husain
- Produced by: Baba Azmi; Namrata Goyal
- Starring: Naseeruddin Shah; Kanwaljit Singh; Aditi Subedi
- Cinematography: Baba Azmi
- Music by: Ripul Sharma
- Production companies: Zee Studios; Azmi Pictures; Filmstoc
- Distributed by: ZEE5
- Release date: 16 January 2026
- Running time: 105 minutes
- Country: India
- Language: Hindi

Safia/Safdar is a 2026 Indian Hindi-language social drama film directed by Baba Azmi and written by Mir Ali Husain. The film stars Naseeruddin Shah, Kanwaljit Singh and Aditi Subedi in lead roles. It premiered on ZEE5 on 16 January 2026. The film follows a young woman who assumes a male identity to protect her family's barber shop after her father becomes incapacitated.

== Plot ==
Safia is a young woman whose family depends on a small barber shop run by her father, Salman. When Salman becomes seriously ill, the family faces financial hardship and the threat of losing the shop to a local moneylender. To protect her family's livelihood and navigate a male-dominated profession, Safia adopts the identity of "Safdar" and takes over the business. As she struggles to keep the shop running, she confronts social prejudice, questions of identity and the challenges of preserving her family's dignity.

== Cast ==
- Naseeruddin Shah as Yazdani
- Kanwaljit Singh as Salman
- Aditi Subedi as Safia / Safdar
- Mehrin Saba as Ismat
- Siddharth Menon as Aman
- Neetu Pandey as Fatima
- Irrfan Jaffer
- Shivi Bajpai

== Release ==
The film was selected for screening at the Chicago South Asian Film Festival in 2025. It was released on ZEE5 on 16 January 2026.
