= Prohor =

- DVD cover of the film
- Directed by: Subhadro Chowdhury
- Screenplay by: Sekhar Das
- Story by: Dulendra Bhowmick
- Produced by: Devjani Gupta
- Starring: Debashree Roy; Alokananda Roy; Barun Chanda; Shilajit
- Cinematography: Amlan Dutta
- Edited by: Saurav Sharangi
- Music by: Indradeep Dasgupta
- Release date: 2002
- Running time: 94 minutes
- Country: India
- Language: Bengali

Prohor is a 2002 Bengali feature film directed by Subhadro Chowdhury. The film is based on Dulendra Bhowmick's short story Dash Number Bed. The cinematographer of the film was Amlan Dutta. It revolves around a nurse who, in one night, discovers that there is a patient in her hospital, who once raped her brutally. It stars Debashree Roy as the central character. The film was edited by Saurav Sharangi and the background score was composed by Chiradeep Dasgupta.

The film was critically appreciated and has often been considered as the best of Debashree Roy. Indian film historian S. Theodore Bhaskaran listed this film into his choice of ten best Indian films. Several film critics have considered this film stodgy and unwieldy. It bagged Indira Gandhi Award for Best Debut Film of a Director in 2002. It was released in some limited halls in 2002.

== Synopsis ==
Nandita who is a nurse encounters an emergent case of a bomb blast. The patient is a bomb blast victim and a criminal under police protection.

== Cast ==
- Debashree Roy as Nandita
- Alokananda Roy as Nandita's mother
- Barun Chanda as Doctor Sengupta
- Shilajit as Sarit
- Chaiti Ghoshal as Seema
- Rajatava Dutta as Biltu
- Manjushree Ganguly as Tuku
- Ritwik

== Awards ==
Award	Year	Category	Result	Ref.
IFFI Award	2003	Special Jury Recognition	Won	
Down Under Film Festival, Australia	2003	Best Actress	Won	
