= Barun Chanda =

Indian Bengali actor and author

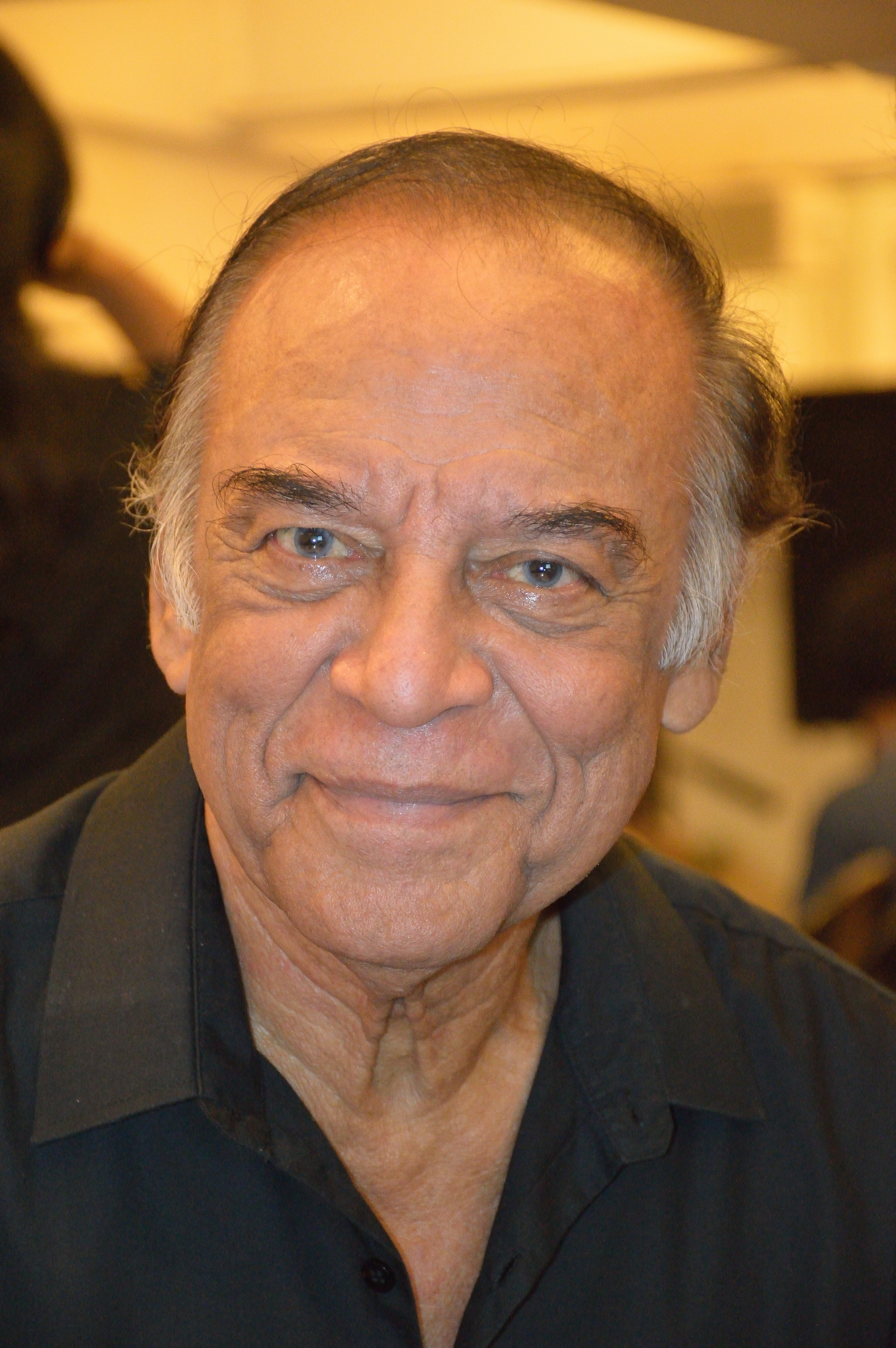
- Chanda in October 2015
- Born: Dhaka, Bangladesh
- Occupations: Author; actor
- Known for: Acting in Seemabaddha (1971)

Barun Chanda is an Indian Bengali advertising professional, actor and author based in the city of Kolkata. He is best known for his leading role in Satyajit Ray's Seemabaddha.

== Education Life ==
Chanda was educated at La Martinière Calcutta, where he was appointed House Captain of Macaulay house in his final year, and at St. Xavier's where he graduated with a Bachelor of Commerce degree (with honours). He further completed his post-graduate degree in English from Jadavpur University, Kolkata.

== Biography ==
Chanda was born on the 17th of July, 1939, in Dhaka in present-day Bangladesh, but came to Kolkata at an early age to pursue higher education. Chanda acted in the 1971 Bengali movie Seemabaddha, directed by Satyajit Ray. After that he did not appear in any films for over twenty years. In 1992 he again acted in director Rituparno Ghosh's debut film Hirer Angti. Next he acted in Kalo Cheetah (2004). Since then he has acted in several movies like Tolly Lights, Antaheen, and Laptop. He recently played the role of the landlord father of Sonakshi Sinha in the Hindi film Lootera.

In 2014, he did commercials for CESC Limited with some social messages.

In 2019, Barun Chanda starred in an independent psychological thriller, Rakkhosh, which has been touted as India's first POV film to be shot on cinema camera. Chanda plays Dr. Idris Shah, a psychiatrist, in the film. The film made the official selection at Pune International Film Festival (PIFF), the Rajasthan International Film Festival (RIFF) and the Orange City International Film Festival (OCIFF) in 2019.

== Filmography ==
- Seemabaddha (1971)
- Hirer Angti (1992)
- Lal Darja (1997)
- Kalo Chita (2004)
- Anuranan (2006)
- Cholo Let's Go (2008)
- Tolly Lights (2008)
- Antaheen (2009)
- Flop-E (2011)
- System (2011)
- Laptop (2011)
- Elar Char Adhyay (2012)
- Hemlock Society (2012)
- Sector V (2012)
- Aborto (2013)
- Lootera (2013)
- Mishawr Rawhoshyo (2013)
- Swabhoomi (2013)
- Chotushkone (2014)
- Roy (2015)
- Bela Seshe (2015)
- Chorabali (2016)
- Kuheli (2016)
- Mentor (2016)
- Sohra Bridge (2016)
- Ebong Kiriti (2017)
- Rina Brown (2017)
- Ek Je Chhilo Raja (2018)
- Rupkothar Kahini (2018)
- Bhobishyoter Bhoot (2019)
- Dil Bechara (2020)
- Bob Biswas (2021)
- Habu Chandra Raja Gobu Chandra Montri (2021)
- Shyam Singha Roy (2021)
- Danny Detective INC (2021)
- Toolsidas Junior (2022)
- Karnasubarner Guptodhon (2022)
- Commando (2022)
- Khela Jokhon (2022)
- One Way (2022)
- Mrs. Chatterjee vs Norway (2023)
- Chor Nikal Ke Bhaga (2023)
- Trial Period (2023)
- Ujjhyo – The Unsaid (2023) (Award Winning Short Film)
- Nadaaniyan (2025)
- Re-Routing (2025)
- Dispersion (Upcoming)

== Books ==
- Robibar
- Coke
- Murder in the Monastery
- Kidnap
- Satyajit Ray: The Man Who Knew Too Much
