= Kanwaljit Singh (actor) =

Indian actor (born 1951)

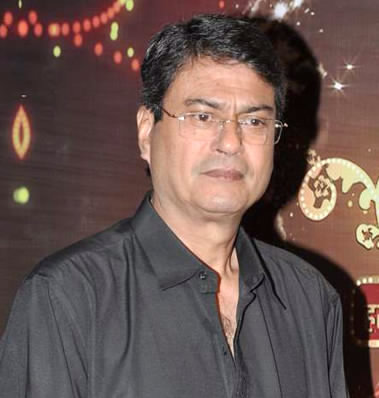
- Kanwaljit Singh in 2013
- Born: 19 September 1951 (age 75); Kanpur, Uttar Pradesh, India
- Occupation: Actor
- Height: 6 ft 2.5 in (1.89 m)
- Spouse: Anuradha Patel (m. 1988)
- Children: 2
- Relatives: Ganguly Family (via marriage)

Kanwaljit (Note: alternative spelling: Kanwaljeet) Singh Walia (born 19 September 1951) is an Indian actor who has performed in films as well as television serials. He has acted in Hindi and Punjabi films.

== Early life and education ==
Kanwaljit Singh Walia was born on 19 September 1951 in Kanpur, Uttar Pradesh, to Sardar Joginder Singh, a field officer at Life Insurance Corporation (LIC) and Rani Ravinder Kaur, a homemaker. He has two brothers.

Due to his father's transferable job, he studied at various schools, including St. George's College, Mussoorie. He graduated from JV Jain Degree College in Saharanpur.

He graduated from the Film and Television Institute of India (FTII) in 1973. Shabana Azmi, Shailendra Singh, Rita Bhaduri, Zarina Wahab, Neelam Mehra and Adil Amaan were his classmates.

== Personal life ==
After a courtship of seven or eight years, he married actress Anuradha Patel (granddaughter of Ashok Kumar) on 13 April 1988.

They have two sons and a goddaughter.

== Filmography ==
=== Films ===
Year	Title	Role	Notes
1977	Shankar Hussain	Inaam Husain	
1982	Pyaas		
1982	Pyar Ke Rahi	Jai	
1982	Satte Pe Satta	Guru Anand	
1982	Jeevan Dhaara	Prem	
1982	Ashanti	Tony	
1984	Seepeeyan		
1984	Farishta		
1986	Ek Misaal	Raj	
1989	Marhi da Diva	Bhanta	
1990	Haar Jeet		
1990	Jeevan Ek Sanghursh	Arjun	
1990	Shaitaani Ilaaka	Amar	
1991	Akayla	Inspector Ahmed	
1991	Aakhri Cheekh	Dr. Khanna	
1996	Maachis	Police Officer Vohra	
1997	Do Rahain	Subhankar	
2002	Jee Aayan Nu	Grewal	
2004	Dil Maange More	Neha's father	
2004	Asa Nu Maan Watna Da	Kawaljit singh dhillon	
2005	Kuchh Meetha Ho Jaye	Col. Bhabus Shamsher Kapoor	
2006	Humko Tumse Pyaar Hai	Doctor	
2006	Dil Apna Punjabi	Kang Singh	
2006	Mannat	Shamsher Singh	
2007	MP3: Mera Pehla Pehla Pyaar	Mr. Sood	
2007	Mitti Wajaan Maardi	Surjit Singh	
2010	Virsa	Ranvir Singh Grewal	
2010	Ik Kudi Punjab Di	Sehajpal's father	
2011	Mere Brother Ki Dulhan	Dilip Dixit	
2011	Mummy Punjabi	Baby Kaur's Husband	
2013	Inkaar	Rahul's Father	
2014	Bang Bang!	Mr. Nanda	
2015	Phir Se...	Mr. Chadda	
2016	Kaptaan	Judge S. S. Chahal	
2016	One Night Stand	Raghav Kapoor	
2016	Rustom	K. G. Bakshi	
2016	Happy Bhag Jayegi	Bau ji	
2016	Tum Bin II	Papa ji	
2017	Raagdesh	Prem's Father	
2018	Jawani Phir Nahi Ani 2	Nawab Saab	Lollywood
2018	Raazi	Older Nikhil Bakshi	Cameo
2019	Ek Ladki Ko Dekha Toh Aisa Laga	Mr Mirza	
2019	Phir Ussi Mod Par	Rashid	
2020	Shimla Mirchi	Tilak	
2021	Tribhanga	Bhaskar Raina	
2021	Sardar Ka Grandson	Gurkeerat Singh	
2021	Chandigarh Kare Aashiqui	Brigadier Mohinder Brar	
2022	Thank God	Aayan's father	
2022	Double XL	Rajshri's father	
2023	Ishq-e-Nadaan	Subhash Kapoor	
2025	Mrs.	Father-in-law	
2025	Mere Husband Ki Biwi	Antra's Father	
2025	Single Salma	Nawab Saahab	
2026	Safia/Safdar		
2026	Satluj	DGP Inderpal Singh Bitta	
2026	Daayra	Ajooni's father	

=== Television ===
Year	Title	Role
1985	Chhapte Chhapte	
1986–1987	Buniyaad'	Satbir
1987	Gul Gulshan Gulfaam	
1988	Param Vir Chakra	Lance Naik Karam Singh
1990	The Sword of Tipu Sultan	Ikram Mulla Khan
1993	Bible Ki Kahaniya	Jacob
1994	Farmaan	Azhar Nawab
1994	Daraar	Karan Khanna
1995	Captain House	Captain
1996–1997	Aahat	Various characters
1998–1999	Family No.1	Deepak Malhotra
1998	Wajood	Thakur Sharanjit Singh
1998–1999	Saans	Gautam Kapoor
1999–2000	Abhimaan	Saigal
2000–2001	Meri Mrs. Chanchala	Mr. Srikant
2000	Siski	Colonel Baldev Singh
2003–2004	Khushiyaan	Mahesh
2004–2005	Saara Akaash	Flight Lieutenant / AOC Abhay Kochar
2006	Aisa Des Hai Mera	Randheer Singh Deol
2006–2007	Barrister Roy	Barrister Roy
2009-2010	Bajega Band Baaja	
2009–2011	Sabki Laadli Bebo	Kukku Narang
2013–2014	Ek Nanad Ki Khushiyon Ki Chaabi...Meri Bhabhi	Colonel Zorawar Shergill
2016–2017	Dil Deke Dekho	Hridayanath Shastri
2019	Typewriter	Madhav Matthews
2020	Hostages	Karnail Singh
2021	Tabbar	Inderji
2024	IC 814: The Kandahar Hijack	J. P. Kohli
2025	Bada Naam Karenge	Anand Rathi
2026	Dhindora	Manohar/Munya Pehelwan

=== Theatre ===
Year	Title	Role	Venue	Ref.
2023	Kaifi Aur Main	Kaifi Azmi	Tata Theatre	
2023	Kaifi Aur Main	Kaifi Azmi	Chowdiah Memorial Hall	

== Awards and nominations ==
Year	Award	Category	Work	Result	Notes	Ref.
2001	Indian Television Academy Awards	ITA Award for Best Actor Drama Jury	Saans	Won	First recipient of the award in this category	
