= Anutap =

- Directed by: Prabhat Roy
- Screenplay by: Prabhat Roy
- Story by: Rita Tarafdar
- Produced by: Shanti Film Corporation
- Starring: Raj Babbar; Debashree Roy; Deepankar Dey; Rabi Ghosh
- Release date: 6 March 1992
- Running time: 146 minutes
- Country: India
- Language: Bengali

Anutap is a 1992 Bengali family drama film directed by Prabhat Roy. It stars Raj Babbar, Debashree Roy as the protagonist, along with Deepankar Dey, Rabi Ghosh, Anup Kumar, Soumitra Banerjee and others.

== Cast ==
- Raj Babbar
- Debashree Roy
- Deepankar Dey
- Rabi Ghosh
- Anup Kumar
- Nirmal Kumar
- Sagarika
- Sanghamitra Bandyopadhyay
- Soumitra Bannerjee
- Master Shibam
