= Balak Gadadhar =

- Video cover of the film
- Directed by: Hiranmoy Sen
- Screenplay by: Hiranmoy Sen
- Produced by: Hiranmoy Sen
- Starring: Debashree Roy; Chhaya Devi; Gita Dey; Nripati Chattopadhyay
- Edited by: Shibsadhan Bhattacharya
- Music by: Ahin Ghosh
- Distributed by: Tirtha Bharati
- Release date: 26 December 1969
- Country: India
- Language: Bengali

Balak Gadadhar is a 1969 Bengali film by Hiranmoy Sen. The film is based on legends about Ramkrishna Paramhansa. It stars Debashree Roy, Chhaya Devi, Gita Dey and Nripati Chattopadhyay. The music of the film was composed by Ahin Ghosh with lyrics penned by Shanti Bhattacharya.

== Cast ==
- Tapas Manna as a pre-adolescent Gadadhar
  - Master Soumitra as an infant Gadadhar
  - Debashree Roy (Credited as Chumki Roy) as a tween Gadadhar/ Devi Kanya Kumari
  - Swapan Kumar as an adult Gadadhar
- Chhaya Devi as Chandramani Devi, the mother of Gadadhar
- Anubha Gupta
- Gita Dey
- Amaresh Das
- Tarapad Basu
- Rabi Roy Choudhury
- Biren Chattopadhyay
- Nripati Chattopadhyay
- Bankim Chattopadhyay
- Biswanath Mukherjee
