= Ee Ganam Marakkumo =

- Poster
- Directed by: N. Sankaran Nair
- Written by: Venu Nagavally; Aniyan Alanchery
- Screenplay by: Venu Nagavally; Aniyan Alanchery
- Produced by: Adoor Manikantan; Adoor Padmakumar
- Starring: Prem Nazir; Debashree Roy; Sukumari; Jagathy Sreekumar; Adoor Bhasi
- Cinematography: Ashok Kumar
- Edited by: M. S. Mani
- Music by: Salil Chowdhary
- Production company: Padmamani Productions
- Distributed by: Padmamani Productions
- Release date: 20 January 1978
- Country: India
- Language: Malayalam

Ee Ganam Marakkumo (transl. Ever Forget this song?) is a 1978 Indian Malayalam-language film, directed by N. Sankaran Nair and produced by Adoor Manikantan and Adoor Padmakumar. The film stars Prem Nazir, Sukumari, Jagathy Sreekumar, Adoor Bhasi and Debashree Roy. The film has musical score by Salil Chowdhary. This is the only work of Debashree Roy in Malayalam film industry till date. The film also marks the debut of Lalu Alex.

== Cast ==
- Prem Nazir as Gopi
- Rugmini Roy as Geetha
- Sukumari as Mariya Chedathi
- Jagathy Sreekumar as Wissle
- Adoor Bhasi
- Thikkurissy Sukumaran Nair as Raghavan Pillai, Gopi's father
- Jose Prakash as Raman Nair
- Sreelatha Namboothiri as Ponnamma
- Bahadoor as Mathai
- Jalaja
- K. P. Ummer as Kurup
- Lalu Alex - (Debut) as Vikraman
- Meena
- Konniyoor Vijayakumar
- Varghees
- Adoor Ravi
- Adoor Manikandan
- Cheriyan
- Balagopal
- Keshavan Nair

== Soundtrack ==
All lyrics are written by O. N. V. Kurup; all music is composed by Salil Chowdhary.

No.	Title	Artist(s)	Length
1.	"Ee Kaikalil"	S. Janaki
2.	"Kalakalam Kaayalolangal"	K. J. Yesudas
3.	"Kurumozhi Mullappoove"	K. J. Yesudas, Vani Jairam
4.	"Onappoove"	K. J. Yesudas
5.	"Raakkuyile Urangoo"	K. J. Yesudas, Sabitha Chowdhary
