= Subarna Golak =

1981 Bengali-language Indian comedy drama film

- Directed by: Manu Sen
- Based on: Subarna Golok by Bankim Chandra Chatterjee
- Screenplay by: Birendra Krishna Bhadra; Beenu Bardhan
- Produced by: Shailen Sarkar
- Starring: Dipankar De; Mahua Roy Chowdhury; Utpal Dutt; Rabi Ghosh; Prosenjit Chatterjee; Debashree Roy; Chinmoy Roy
- Cinematography: Ajoy Mitra
- Edited by: Rabin Sen
- Music by: Hemanta Mukherjee
- Production company: Kalimata Productions
- Distributed by: Mitali Films
- Release date: 17 April 1981
- Running time: 104 minutes
- Country: India
- Language: Bengali

Subarna Golak (transl. The Golden Ball) is a 1981 Indian Bengali-language fantasy action comedy film directed by Manu Sen. Produced by Shailen Sarkar under the banner of Kalimata Productions, the film is based on the 1885 novel of the same name by Bankim Chandra Chatterjee. It stars an ensemble cast of Dipankar De, Prosenjit Chatterjee, Utpal Dutt, Mahua Roy Chowdhury, Debashree Roy, Rabi Ghosh, Chinmoy Roy and Sulata Chowdhury. The film satirically plots Lord Shiva throwing a golden ball away which reaches earth and creates a number of errors.

Initially adapted as a stage play, the screenplay and dialogues of the film are jointly written and developed by Birendra Krishna Bhadra and Beenu Bardhan respectively for a film. Music of the film is composed by Hemanta Mukherjee, with lyrics penned by Shibdas Bandyopadhyay.

== Plot ==
Hindu deity Shiva threw away a golden ball that even the gods are scared to keep. The ball creates greed and violence amongst the gods due to its opulence. Shiva had endowed the ball with a magical power, whenever a person physically hands it over to someone else, the giver and the receiver start behaving like each other. When it reaches Earth, accidentally a typical Bengali Babu is the first person to find it while going to his in-laws’ home. He gives it to his servant to carry, and when their minds get exchanged, comedy ensues.

== Cast ==
- Prosenjit Chatterjee as Dipu
- Deepankar De as Kalikanta Chowdhury
- Rabi Ghosh as Rama
- Utpal Dutt as Nilratan
- Mahua Roychoudhury as Kamala, Nilratan's elder daughter and Kalikanta Chowdhury's wife
- Debashree Roy as Bimala, Nilratan's younger daughter and Dipu's love interest
- Chinmoy Roy as Gobra
- Sulata Chowdhury as Tarango, Gobra's wife
- Kalikinkar Banerjee
- Rathin Basu
- Bishwanath Banerjee
- Swaraj Basu
- Shambhu Bhattacharya
- Dhiman Chakraborty

== Music ==
- "Katodin Ami Dekhini Tomar Mukh" - Arundhati Holme Chowdhury
- "Ei Chand Mukh Dekhe" - Papia Bhattacharya
- "Shukla Paksha Krishna Paksha" - Anup Ghoshal
- "Ami Aaj Bhebechhi Mone" - Anup Ghoshal
- "Din Nei Raat Nei" - Hemant Kumar, Chorus
