= Chokher Aloy =

1989 film

- Directed by: Sachin Adhikari
- Starring: Debashree Roy; Prosenjit Chatterjee; Tapas Paul; Anil Chatterjee
- Music by: Bappi Lahiri
- Release date: 1989
- Country: India
- Language: Bengali

Chokher Aloy is a 1989 Bengali film directed by Sachin Adhikari. The music of the film was composed by Bappi Lahiri. The film stars Debashree Roy, Prosenjit Chatterjee and Tapas Paul in the leading roles.

== Cast ==
- Debashree Roy
- Prosenjit Chatterjee
- Tapas Paul
- Subhendu Chatterjee
- Anil Chatterjee
- Beena Banerjee
- Shakuntala Barua
- Phalguni Banerjee
- Premanshu Basu
- Shyamal Chakraborty
- Amitabh Chatterjee
- Prashant Chatterjee
- Swarup Dutta
- Aloka Ganguly
- Geeta Karmakar
- Tarun Mitra
- Sadhan Maulik
- Anand Mukherjee
- Mrinal Mukherjee
- Purnendu Mukherjee
- Suneel Mukherjee
- Balai Mukherjee
