= Mej Didi (2003 film) =

- video cover of the film
- Directed by: Shantimoy Bandyopadhyay
- Produced by: Samrat Banerjee
- Starring: Debashree Roy; Ranjit Mallick; Debraj Ray; Chinmoy Roy; Mrinal Mukherjee; Ramaprasad Banik; Manoj Mitra; Santana Bose
- Music by: Suparna Kanti Ghosh
- Release date: 2003
- Country: India
- Language: Bengali

Mej Didi is a 2003 Bengali film directed by Shantimoy Bandyopadhyay and produced by Samrat Banerjee. The film is based on Sarat Chandra Chattopadhyay's short story of the same name. (Note: The story was first published in Bharatbarsha, a Bengali newspaper, in 1915.) The screenplay and dialogue of the film was written by Shaktipada Rajguru. The film endorses altruism. The plot is set in the early twentieth century. It revolves around an orphan teenager who is oppressed by his unkind stepsister and a woman who shelters him. It stars Debashree Roy in the title role.

The film failed to earn critical favour. Rajguru was criticised for his weak screenplay. The portrayal of Bipin Chatujje was critically panned. While Hemangini is the face of altruism in the original story, the film depicts both Hemangini and her husband Bipin to be altruistic. Ranjit Mallick's performance in the film failed to win critical favour. Despite critical failure, the film was financially successful.

== Plot ==
After Keshta's parents untimely dies, he is left abandoned. It is suggested that he be sent to the house of his stepsister Kadambini who is married to Nabin Chatujje, as he has no one to take care of. Haran, one of his well-wishers takes Keshta to Kadambini's house. Kadambini feels disgusted with Keshta. He is employed at Nabin's shop and extremely ill-treated by his stepsister. He is often left to starvation. Anyway, Keshta is well-treated by Hemangini whom he addresses as "Mej Didi". She often feeds him. Kadambini is abhorrent of Hemangini's love towards Keshta. She insists Nabin, her husband that he should give Keshta a lesson if he ever visits Hemangini again. Nabin tells Bipin that he does not like that Keshta is feed by Hemangini. Bipin fears his brother's wrath and tells his wife not to feed Keshta any more. Anyway she continues to disobey her husband and feeds Keshta secretly as she cannot bear that Keshta is often left to starvation. When Hemangini falls sick, Keshta decides to get prasad from Vishalakshi Temple, in his village. He steals three rupees from Nabin's shop and gets prasad for Hemangini. He is eventually exposed that he has stolen the money for the sake of Hemangini's recovery. Kadambini severely denounces Hemangini claiming that the latter has actually instigated Keshta to steal. Her words seem to be unbearable to Hemangini who slaps Keshta for obtaining prasad for herself. Keshta is beaten hard by Nabin and left abandoned at the premises of the village temple. Anyway, Nabin does not want to abandon Keshta as the latter is a great help at his shop. Moreover, it is quite easy to exploit him. The next morning he visits the village temple to get Keshta back and discovers that Hemangini has already reached there to comfort him. Hemangini who fears neither Nabin's wrath nor Bipin's. She says that she does want Keshta to go back to Nabin's place any more; instead she herself will look after him. She leaves her family behind and goes away with Keshta. When Bipin returns, he learns of Hemangini's departure. He runs after her cart. When he finally meets her, he promises that he will look after Keshta if the two return.

== Cast ==
- Ranjit Mallick as Bipin Chatujje
- Debashree Roy as Hemangini, Bipin's wife aka Mej Didi
- Debraj Ray as Nabin Chatujje, Bipin's elder brother
- Chaitaly Chakraborty as Kadambini, Nabin's wife and Keshta's stepsister
- Manoj Mitra as Haran
- Ramaprasad Banik
- Chinmoy Roy
- Sambhu Bhattacharjya
- Master Riju
- Sreshtha Mukherjee
- Mimi Dutta
- Master Utpal
- Master Partha
- Abhijit Nag
- Master Debarjun
