= Justice Chaudhury =

- Theatrical release poster
- Directed by: K. Raghavendra Rao
- Written by: Kader Khan (dialogues)
- Screenplay by: K. Raghavendra Rao
- Story by: Satyanand
- Based on: Justice Chowdary (1982) by K. Raghavendra Rao
- Produced by: G. A. Seshagiri Rao; Krishna (Presents)
- Starring: Jeetendra; Sridevi; Hema Malini; Moushumi Chatterjee
- Cinematography: K. S. Prakash
- Edited by: Kotagiri Venkateswara Rao
- Music by: Bappi Lahiri
- Production company: Padmalaya Studios
- Release date: 15 July 1983
- Running time: 148 minutes
- Country: India
- Language: Hindi

Justice Chaudhury is a 1983 Hindi film, produced by G.A. Seshagiri Rao under the Padmalaya Studios banner, presented by Krishna and directed by K. Raghavendra Rao. The film stars Jeetendra, Sridevi, Hema Malini, Moushumi Chatterjee and music composed by Bappi Lahiri. The film is a remake of Telugu movie Justice Chowdary (1982), which also stars Sridevi in the same role.

== Plot ==
Advocate RK Choudhary a disciple of justice sentences a hardcore criminal Shankar Singh to death. Hence, his villainous twin Jai Singh seeks vengeance and blends to repay with an advocate Kailash Nath who envies Choudhary. Choudhary is lively with his ideal wife Janki, son Inspector Ramesh, daughter-in-law Lata, and a dumb daughter Lakshmi. Parallelly, Ramu a juvenile one that resembles Choudhary is a motor mechanic & racer too. Ramu falls for Rekha the daughter of Kailash Nath. Gazing the caliber of Ramu Jai Singh selects him as his white knight that succeeds in several tasks courageously. Meanwhile, Choudhary is appointed as Chief Justice of the High Court which abides the noxious. So, they ploy by utilizing their acolyte Gopal and knit him with Lakshmi to exploit Choudhary. Nevertheless, Choudhary is hard though Gopal expels Lakshmi. Once, Rekha witnesses Ramu's criminality and accuses then he divulges the actuality. Explicitly, all efforts are on behalf of his mother Radha who is in prison for the crime he committed. Kailashnath discovers Ramu as Choudhary's son when he intrigues him by forging Choudhary as a deceiver of his mother and provokes Ramu to pay him back. Here, Ramu in the guise of Choudhary incriminates Ramesh when Choudhary is compelled to penalize him without fear and favor. Thereafter, Choudhary starts digging into the matter when he learns the reality regarding Radha & Ramu and recalls the past. Indeed, Choudhary & Radha are love birds in the college and decided to knit shortly. But suddenly, Radha quits when ascertaining her as dead Choudhary and nuptial with Janki. At present, Radha releases, Choudhary meets her and knows that she deliberately did, perceiving Janki's love for him. Choudhary also explains the credulity of Ramu. Listening to it, Radha makes Ramu realize. Being cognizant of it, Jai Singh seizes Choudhary,s family including Kailash Nath. However, Choudhary gamely breaks his play along with Ramu. At last, Jai Singh ceased when Radha sacrifices her life while guarding Choudhary Finally, the movie ends on a happy note with the marriage of Ramu & Rekha.

== Cast ==
- Jeetendra as Justice R. K. Chaudhary / Ramu (Double Role)
- Sridevi as Rekha
- Hema Malini as Radha
- Moushumi Chatterjee as Janki
- Raj Kiran as Gopal
- Shakti Kapoor as Jai Singh / Shankar Singh (Double Role)
- Kader Khan as Advocate Kailash
- Arun Govil as Inspector Ramesh
- Debashree Roy as Laxmi
- Asrani as Alexander Onassis Anthony
- Prema Narayan as Alexander's Girlfriend
- Bharat Bhushan as Jagannath
- Satyendra Kapoor as Dr. Murthy
- Manmohan Krishna

== Soundtrack ==
Song	Singer
"Insaaf Ki Kursi"	Kishore Kumar
"Zindagi Anmol"	Kishore Kumar, Lata Mangeshkar
"Laxmi O Laxmi"	Kishore Kumar, Asha Bhosle
"Maine Tujhe Chhua"	Kishore Kumar, Asha Bhosle
"Mamma Miya"	Kishore Kumar, Asha Bhosle
"Sath Mere Aaogi"	Kishore Kumar, Asha Bhosle
