= Seepeeyan =

- Directed by: Akash Jain
- Produced by: Akash Jain
- Starring: Debashree Roy; Kanwaljit Singh; Om Puri; Ranjeet
- Edited by: Venketesh Naik
- Music by: Raghunath Seth
- Release date: 1984
- Country: India

Seepeeyan (transl. Oysters) is a 1984 Indian drama film produced and directed by Akash Jain. The film was edited by Venketesh Naik. The film revolves around a woman who plunges into a river after her boyfriend refused to marry her, but is saved by another man of inferior caste whom she marries. It stars Debashree Roy, Kanwaljit Singh and Om Puri in the leading roles. The music of the film was composed by Raghunath Seth.

The film created ripples in the eighties due to its themes of pre-marital sex.The film received mixed reviews from the critics and was a hit at box office.

== Plot ==
Kalyani is a young beautiful woman who falls in love with a young man named Jeetu. Jeetu confesses his love for Kalyani and promises her to be always by her side. Kalyani and Jeetu make love. After her mother's death, Kalyani proposes to Jeetu to get married. Jeetu declares that he is not willing to spend the rest of his life with Kalyani. Kalyani feels like she has been deceived and loses all the yearning for her life. She plunges into a river they were standing beside and is drifted to somewhere else where a man named Gokul finds her unconscious on the surface of the water. Gokul brings her to his home and cures her well. Kalyani marries Gokul. Eventually Jeetu learns that Kalyani has been married to a man of an inferior caste. Jeetu meets her and confesses that he is contrite for what he told her earlier and now he wants her back in his life. He also tries to persuade her that she cannot spend the rest of her life with a man like Gokul who belongs to an indigent lower caste. Gokul overhears what Jeetu says to Kalyani and he insists that she return to Jeetu. But she remains resolute. She declares that she has fallen for Gokul and is not willing to leave him at any cost. Gokul is overjoyed to have heard this and they embrace.

== Cast ==
- Kanwaljit Singh as Jeetu
- Debashree Roy as Kalyani
- Om Puri as Gokul
- Ranjeet

== Music ==
1. " Aayenge Tere Dwar Maata" - Mahendra Kapoor
2. "Jeevan Pal Do Pal Ka Saathi" - Anoop Jalota
3. "Kya Kahen Kisse Kahen" - Bhupinder Singh
4. "Main Titli Rango Ki Kali" - Alka Yagnik
5. "O Badhau Na Mohe Dibiya" - Alka Yagnik

== Reception ==
The role played by Roy was reviewed as a borrowed idea from Tess of the d'Urbervilles by Thomas Hardy as her character gets seduced and deceived by the male lead played by Kanwaljit Singh. Filmzack wrote: "Her role, somehow reminds us of Tess of the d'Urbervilles by Thomas Hardy, whose innocence is ripped apart by the debauched manhood."

The gaze which demonstrates the subtle incongruence in the conjugal life of Kalyani and her husband Gokul. The gaze was reviewed as an alteration of any cinematic sequence to manifest the discordance of relationship between a woman of an upper periphery of society and a man of a lower caste. (Om Puri and Debashree Roy in a sequence of the film)

Roy gained mixed review for her performance. She was adulated for her gaze but criticised as well for her whimpering performance in some of the sequences especially when Kalyani learns her mother has died.

Om Puri was applauded for his role in the film. Filmzack wrote: "It's a real hard thing to find out a single rift in his performance and this time also, there is no exception."
