= Life in Park Street =

- Film poster
- Directed by: Raj Mukherjee
- Produced by: Pankaj Agarwal
- Starring: Soumitra Chatterjee; Debashree Roy; Shankar Chakraborty
- Edited by: Tapas Chakraborty
- Release date: 20 July 2012 (Kolkata)
- Country: India
- Language: Bengali

Life in Park Street is a 2012 Indian Bengali film directed by Raj Mukherjee. This film revolves around the people and their lives at Park Street, Kolkata.

== Plot ==
Park Street is a cosmopolitan place in Kolkata and the film focuses on different aspects of life of this locality. It focuses on different characters like a drug addict young girl, gays raping boys, pimps, housewife having affair with others etc.

== Cast ==
- Soumitra Chatterjee
- Debashree Roy as Radhika
- Shankar Chakraborty
- Baishakhi Marjit
- Jagannath Guha

== See also ==
- Dwando
