= Nadi Theke Sagare =

1978 Indian film

- Poster of the film
- Directed by: Arabinda Mukhopadhyay
- Screenplay by: Sunil Gangopadhyay; Arabinda Mukhopadhyay
- Story by: Prasanta Chowdhury
- Produced by: Sitalamata Pictures
- Starring: Soumitra Chatterjee; Sandhya Roy; Debashree Roy; Mithun Chakraborty; Chhaya Devi; Ajitesh Bandopadhyay; Rabi Ghosh; Anup Kumar; Gita Dey
- Edited by: Subodh Ray
- Music by: Hemanta Mukherjee
- Release date: 4 August 1978
- Running time: 135 min.
- Country: India
- Language: Bengali

Nadi Theke Sagare (transl. From river to ocean) is a 1978 Indian Bengali-language romantic drama film directed by Arabinda Mukhopadhyay. The film was written by Prasanta Chowdhury. The screenplay was written by Sunil Gangopadhyay and Arabinda Mukhopadhyay. It revolves around a prostitute who struggles to get her daughter married to a decent man. It stars Soumitra Chatterjee, Sandhya Roy, Debashree Roy, Mithun Chakraborty, Chhaya Devi, Rabi Ghosh and Anup Kumar. Debashree Roy was credited as Rumki Roy in the film. The music of the film was composed by Hemanta Mukherjee with lyrics penned by Pulak Bandyopadhyay and Arabinda Mukhopadhyay.

This is the film where Debashree Roy, for the first time played a leading role. It was the first film where Mithun Chakraborty and Debashree Roy collaborated. She played Champa, the unfathered daughter of Sohagi played by Sandhya Roy, and had to enact the adolescence as well as the adulthood of the character she was given. She drew critical favour for her gaze in the film. Soumitra Chatterjee and Ajitesh Banerjee won critical favour for their performance in the film. The film was a major success at box office.

== Plot ==
Roy was critically appreciated for her gaze in the film. She had to enact the adolescence as well as the adulthood of the character she was given. A perfectionist, director Arabinda Mukhopadhyay wanted her gaze to be mature enough for the adult role while practically, she was not an adult at that time. To shed off her juvenile, impulsive look, He instructed her not to undergo any conversation or any kind of playful activity for a long time before shooting.

Sohagi is a prostitute who attempts to commit suicide as she has been deceived by a man whom she loved. She is saved by Shyamapada who is a priest. She returns to Basak Lane where she works as a prostitute. She gives birth to a daughter named Champa. When Champa grows up, Sohagi's mother Kusum insists that Champa be a prostitute just like her mother Sohagi but Sohagi refuses her mother's proposal stating that she wants Champa to marry Sagar.

== Cast ==
- Soumitra Chatterjee as Shyamapada
- Sandhya Roy as Sohagi
- Mithun Chakraborty as Sagar
- Debashree Roy as Champa
- Chhaya Devi as Bhaba Dasi
- Shamita Biswas as Kusum
- Gita Dey
- Sulata Chowdhury
- Ajitesh Bandopadhyay
- Rabi Ghosh
- Anup Kumar
- Mrinal Mukherjee
- Ajit Chatterjee

== Reception ==
The film drew critical favour for the performance of the cast. It was criticised for its slow-paced screenplay.
