= Lal Ronger Duniya =

- Directed by: Nilanjan Bhattacharya
- Written by: Rupak Saha
- Produced by: Kaustuv Roy
- Starring: Debashree Roy; Kunal Mitra; Rajesh Sharma; Locket Chatterjee
- Release date: 19 September 2008
- Country: India
- Language: Bengali

Lal Ronger Duniya (Bengali: লাল রঙের দুনিয়া) is a 2008 Bengali drama film directed by Nilanjan Bhattacharya and produced by Kaustuv Roy. The film is based on a novel Lal Ranger Prithibi written by Rupak Saha. The film stars Debashree Roy as the protagonist. The film was a major debacle at box office.

== Plot ==
Himan, a boy from a good family accidentally lands in a red light area after he spots his sister in that area one day, who refuses to recognize him. He is thrashed by the local goon, but he is saved by Altamasi, a brothel owner who in due course brings him up as her own son. Other sex workers try to poison Altamasi's mind against Himan, but she has immense belief in him. Himan who has an excellent academic record gives tuitions to earn some money. He is very fond of Dolly, Altamasi's younger daughter and wants her to be away from this bad world. He has two friends called Shiuli and Mehuli, twin sisters who are totally opposites in character. Mehuli loves Himan, but since he never reciprocates her love, she never forgives him. In due course of time, Himan learns that she runs a massage parlour where masseuses double up as sex workers. Himan wants to do something to improve the lives of the sex workers so he becomes a social worker by chance. He is very close to Dallia, a former sex worker who runs a high class brothel, but wants to do something for this section of the society. She is made a candidate for the elections, but discovers that she has become part of the vicious circle and that in due course of time she would be eliminated by the very people who are helping her to contest the election. Shiva becomes extremely dangerous and sets a sex worker on fire after gang raping her. Dallia cannot take it any more and decides to finish off Shiva once and for all. She hacks Shiva to death and is sent to jail.

== Cast ==
- Debashree Roy as Dalia
- Tathagata Mukherjee as Himan
- Kunal Mitra
- Rajesh Sharma as Shiva
- Locket Chatterjee as Mehuli
- Debdut Ghosh
- Gourishankar Panda
