= Hirer Angti =

- DVD cover
- Directed by: Rituporno Ghosh
- Starring: Basanta Choudhury; Ayan Banerjee; Gyanesh Mukherjee; Moon Moon Sen; Pradip Mukherjee; Shakuntala Barua; Barun Chanda; Dulal Lahiri; Sumanta Mukherjee
- Edited by: Ujjwal Nandi; Atish Nandi; Arup Ghosh
- Music by: Soumik Mitra
- Production companies: NFDC; CFSI
- Release date: 1992
- Running time: 107 minutes
- Language: Bengali

Hirer Angti (Bengali: হীরের আংটি) is a 1992 Bengali film directed by Rituparno Ghosh in his first film as a director. It is based on a story of the same name written by Shirshendu Mukhopadhyay.

== Plot ==
Gandharva Kumar disturbs the joy of Durga Puja celebrations at Ratanlal Babu's house. Gandharva becomes a favourite of Ratanlal Babu's grandchildren, Habul and Tinni, with his magic powers. He also reveals an age-old secret: that he is the successor to the ancestral property of Ratanlal Babu. The whole family is shattered and grows gloomier when some dramatic incidents take place. It is told that Gandharva is a fake. The climax of the story is whether Gandharva Kumar's magic trick works or not.

== Cast ==
- Basanta Choudhury as Ratanlal Bannerjee
- Gyanesh Mukherjee as Panchu
- Pradip Mukherjee as Bishweshwar
- Shakuntala Barua as Pratima
- Barun Chanda as Someshwar
- Moon Moon Sen as the wife of Someshwar
- Sumanta Mukherjee as Bireshwar
- Dulal Lahiri as Shwet
- Ayan Banerjee as Gandharba Kumar / Dilip Kumar
- Sunil Mukherjee as Shashthicharan
- Bankim Ghosh as Gupi Syankra
- Sandipan Mukherjee as Habul
- Anchita Dutta as Tinni
- Deepankar De as voice of Gandharba Kumar

== Production ==
Hirer Angti was a Children's Film Society of India (CFSI) production. It was adapted from an original story by Shirshendu Mukhopadhyay. It was Ghosh's first film (by his count, he had directed over 400 advertising films) after coming into filmmaking without any formal training, and arrived shortly after Bengali cinema was caught up in a debate between intellectual and commercial cinema, with the theatre-going urban bhadralok largely absent.

== Release ==
The film won an international award, but nonetheless did not get a public theatrical release; it was exhibited at small festivals for children's films and on television. Of the award, Ghosh commented afterwards that "it got an award at a festival somewhere in the U.S. or Europe, but children in India probably did not get a chance to see it". The particular award is not known from available sources.

== Reception ==
In a 2013 retrospective, Shoma A. Chatterji wrote that the film "looks like a product directed, put together rather by an amateur trying his hand in a new medium", describing it as "slip-shod and half-heartedly handled". In a 2024 retrospective, The Telegraph described it as "much less complex compared to his later works" and added that the film "reflects Rituparno's penchant for exploring emotions even when creating a child's film".

== Themes ==
In a 2023 article in the Quarterly Review of Film and Video, Akaitab Mukherjee analyses Hirer Angti alongside Ghosh's later children's film Khela, exploring notions of escape, queerness, authorship and adaptation in the children's film. Mukherjee argues that Ghosh's adaptations treat the idea of escape as a mode of resistance to the heteronormative family and as a vector for a queer vantage point in the spectacle of adaptation.The film's central narrative, exploring the arrival of a mysterious outsider who thwarts the patriarchal household, has been read as an early precursor to Ghosh's later exploration of alternative bloodlines and subversion of standard family constructs.
