= Ghata =

1978 film by Kuldeep Pandey

- Poster of the movie
- Directed by: Kuldeep Pandey
- Produced by: Kuldeep Pandey
- Starring: Anil Dhawan; Pradeep Kumar; Debashree Roy; Pratima Devi; Jalal Agha; Kamal Kapoor
- Music by: Ravindra Jain
- Release date: 1978
- Running time: 155 mins
- Country: India
- Language: Hindi

Ghata (Hindi: घटा) is a 1978 Indian film directed and produced by Kuldeep Pandey. The film evolves around a man who on being disheartened at his friend's unchastity, falls for the woman who has been betrothed to his friend. It stars Anil Dhawan as the protagonist. The music of the film was composed by Ravindra Jain.

The film garnered a mixed review upon its release. A part of film critics criticized the film for its uncurbed over the shoulder shots. The film was also criticized for its plot slowing down gradually. Some of the sequences of the film have been appreciated as having been made proficiently, especially the sequence where the protagonist's conundrum to pick up the flower on the riverside is an explanatory manifestation of his predicament between his adherence to his friend and his love for Sheetal.

== Plot ==
Ajay and Suresh are colleagues to each other. Suresh is a philanderer who thinks it is fun to flirt with girls. Though a gentleman, Ajay is often rollicked when Suresh playfully articulates how he seduced a girl. On a leave, Ajay comes with Suresh to the latter's native village. There he discovers that Suresh has already been betrothed to a girl named Sheetal who is unaware of the playful side of Suresh. Ajay befriends Sheetal and learns that her family has been leading an indigent life since her father died. Ajay denounces Suresh when the former learns that Suresh has an illegitimate relationship with the nymphomaniac wife of the latter's wealthy neighbor Ratanlal Sharma and persuades him not to pursue any kind of indecent relationship any more as he is betrothed to Sheetal. But Suresh does not seem to pay any heed to his words. Eventually Ajay falls for Sheetal and finds himself in a dilemma whether he should expose the real nature of Suresh and confess his love for her or he should stay loyal to his friend who thinks Ajay to be his confidant.

== Cast ==
- Anil Dhawan as Ajay
- Pradeep Kumar as Basudev Mehra
- Debashree Roy as Sheetal
- Pratima Devi as Sheetal's grandmother
- Jalal Agha as Suresh
- Kamal Kapoor as father of Suresh
- Goga Kapoor as Ratanlal Sharma
- Manik Irani as the henchman
