= Hothat Dekha =

- Theatrical poster
- Directed by: Reshmi Mitra; Shahadat Hossain
- Screenplay by: Aloke Mukherjee
- Produced by: Impress Telefilms, Reshmi Pictures and Bidyut Das
- Starring: Debashree Roy; Ilias Kanchan; Deep Bhattacharya; Jannatul Sumaiya Heme; Sankar Chakraborty; Tulika Bose; Kartik Das Baul; Parthasarathi Deb
- Cinematography: Badal Sarkar
- Edited by: EditFX Studio
- Music by: Raja Narayan Deb
- Production companies: Impress Telefilms, Reshmi Pictures and Bidyut Das
- Release date: 31 March 2017
- Running time: 103 minutes
- Countries: India, Bangladesh
- Language: Bengali

Hothat Dekha is a 2017 Bengali romantic drama film directed by Reshmi Mitra and Shahadat Hossain. The film was originally inspired by a poem of the same name by Tagore. It stars Debashree Roy, Ilias Kanchan, Deep Bhattacharya, Jannatul Sumaiya Heme, Sankar Chakraborty, Tulika Bose and Kartik Das Baul and Parthasarathi Deb. Jannatul Sumaiya Heme made a debut with this movie. The music of the film was composed by Raja Narayan Deb. The film was shot in Chittagong.
