= Antore Bahire =

- Antore Bahire poster
- Directed by: Somnath Sen
- Written by: Somnath Sen
- Screenplay by: Rajib Das
- Produced by: Dinesh Modi; Jyoti Modi
- Starring: Debashree Roy; Abhishek Chatterjee; Kalyan Chatterjee; Bodhisatya Majumdar; Jack; Chitrangada Chakraborty; Abhiraj; Moubani Sorcar
- Cinematography: Arindam Bhattacharjee
- Edited by: Dipak Mandal
- Music by: Chandan Roy
- Release date: 14 December 2012 (Kolkata)
- Country: India
- Language: Bengali

Antore Bahire is a 2012 Bengali drama film directed by Somnath Sen and edited by Dipak Mandal. Arindam Bhattacharjee is the cinematographer of the film. The film stars Debashree Roy and Abhishek Chatterjee, and marks the big screen debut of actress Chitrangada Chakraborty. The music and background score of the film was composed by Chandan Roy Chowdhury with lyrics penned by Somnath Sen.

== Synopsis ==
Dipto and Riddhi are married and, working in a corporate office, both have busy work schedules. All was well until Dipto began an extramarital affair with his colleague, Shruti. Presently, they are awaiting a divorce. A mysterious entity known as Khushi enters their lives and controls their destinies.

== Cast ==
- Debashree Roy as Khushi
- Abhishek Chatterjee
- Moubani Sorcar as Riddhi
- Kalyan Chatterjee
- Bodhisatya Majumdar
- Jack as Arjun
- Chitrangada Chakraborty as Shruti
- Abhiraj as Dipto

== Songs ==
No.	Title	Length
1.	"Ghore Mane Ki Phakir"
2.	"Hridayan Kotha Boloto"
3.	"Kothamalara Jane"
4.	"Chokher Kajole"
5.	"Ekla Akash"
