= Shukno Lanka =

2010 Indian Bengali-language film

- Directed by: Gaurabh Pandey
- Written by: Gaurabh Pandey
- Produced by: Joy Ganguly
- Starring: Mithun Chakraborty; Debashree Roy; Sabyasachi Chakrabarty
- Cinematography: Debraj Ray
- Edited by: Mahadeb Shi
- Music by: Debajyoti Misra
- Production companies: Mumbai Mantra; Mojo Productions
- Release date: 2 July 2010
- Country: India
- Language: Bengali

Shukno Lanka is a 2010 Bengali-language Indian drama film directed by Gaurabh Pandey, starring Mithun Chakraborty, Debashree Roy and Sabyasachi Chakrabarty.

== Plot ==
Chinu Nandi was a talented part-time actor and full-time employee of a coal-mine. Once he loses his job, he takes up acting as his full-time job. However, not starting in the profession early proves to be his demerit. He finds himself as a 250 bucks per day actor, who gets paid only if he gets a chance to play some part on the day. He is cast mainly as elderly house-servants and similar small characters in thoroughly commercial movies. Even so, he tries to give his best in such roles, which makes the stars of such movies (mainly Tublai) insecure, and they start to avoid giving him roles.

Meanwhile, Joy Sundar Sen, a world-renowned director who recently won an award for his movie at the Berlin Film Festival, starts working on his new project: a movie based on Ritwik Ghatak's short story Porosh Pathor (The Philosopher's Stone). In order to portray the protagonist of this movie (Chandrakant), Sen selects Chinu Nandi, much to the dismay of the superstars of the industry, some of whom are openly hostile with Nandi for being 'the chosen one'.

Through the course of filming this movie, we see a lot of these two characters, their sincerity, their devotion to their fields, their love for art, and their talent. When it comes to family, however, Nandi is very happy being a poor simpleton with his wife, whom he loves very dearly, and cherishes his hobby of cuisine. Sen, on the contrary, is indifferent to his wife, who constantly tries to make him feel her presence through her love for him.

The movie, after a couple of obstacles, finally gets released, and everything falls into place. Sen and his wife revive their love for each other, and Nandi wins the respect of his wife and the whole neighborhood.

== Cast ==
- Mithun Chakraborty as Chinu Nandi.
- Debashree Roy as Joy's wife
- Sabyasachi Chakrabarty as Joy Sundar Sen
- Emma Brown Garett
- Angana Bose as Chinu's wife
- Saheb Chatterjee
- Kunal Mitra as Tublai
- Biswanath Basu
- Arindam Sil
- Nandini Chaterjee
- Chattrapati Dutta
- Suman De

== Premiere ==
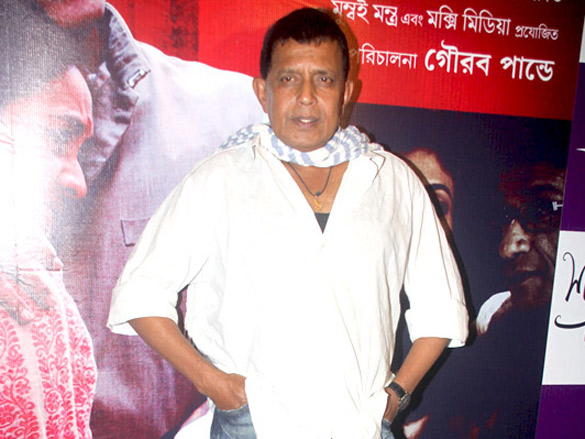
Mithun Chakraborty at the premiere of Skukno Lanka

Shukno Lanka is the story of a Junior artist living in a tinsel town, played by Mithun Chakraborty, who is yet to taste success after a struggle of 30 years of acting career. Sabyasachi Chakrabarty plays the character of Joy Sundar Sen, who is inspired by Ritwik Ghatak casts junior artiste Chinu Nandi a chance in the lead role in his next venture.

The film motivates thousands of junior artistes, when the character played by Mithun gets signed for an international project as the leading man.

The film has allusions to the works of Ritwik Ghatak and Satyajit Ray, and even the character played by Sabyasachi Chakrabarty has apparent similarities with Ray. Mithun Chakraborty spoke about his character Chinu Nandi – this character gave him an opportunity to retrace his struggling days. He told "It has taken me back closer to my roots. But if you look closely, I, Mithun Chakraborty, have not completely outgrown the Chinu Nandy of Shukno Lanka. In a way all of us are bit-role players in the drama of life."

== Awards ==
Shukno Lanka won Mithun, the Best Actor award in the Critics category of Star Jalsha Awards 2011 for the year 2010.
