= Phulwari (1984 film) =

- Movie poster
- Directed by: Mukul Dutt
- Story by: Mukul Dutt
- Produced by: Rajshri Productions
- Starring: Debashree Roy; Shashi Puri; Iftekhar
- Edited by: Mukhtar Ahmed
- Music by: Raj Kamal
- Release date: 4 September 1984
- Running time: 159 mins
- Country: India
- Language: Hindi

Phulwari is a 1984 Indian Hindi-language drama film directed by Mukul Dutt and produced by Tarachand Barjatya. The screenplay was also written by Dutt. It stars Debashree Roy and Shashi Puri. The music was composed by Raj Kamal with lyrics by Taj Quadri and R N Gustakh.

== Plot ==
Arun meets Rajiv Mathur, the newly assigned welfare inspector of the Forest office, at the station. Rajiv says that he is headed for Talpur, and Arun informs him that Talpur is far away, offering Rajiv hospitality for the day. Rajiv arrives at Arun's place and discovers that he is wealthy. Arun also notices that Rajiv is carrying a flute and requests that he play it that night. While Rajiv plays the flute, they are interrupted by the sudden arrival of Lali, Arun's younger sister. The next day, Arun drops Rajiv off at his office.

Rajiv attends Lali's birthday party but is interrupted by Pyare, a servant at Arun's house, who informs him that a man from his provision has been severely bitten by a rabid dog and needs to be taken to the doctor. Just as Rajiv is about to leave, Lali stalls him, saying that it is Pyare's job to take the wounded man to the doctor, adding that the whole thing is being done to spoil her birthday party. Rajiv is stunned at Lali's rudeness and declares that she is selfish and does not care for anyone but herself.

Lali later visits Rajiv and apologizes for her behavior. She begins to visit him regularly, and Rajiv slowly develops feelings for her. One day, Lali asks Rajiv if he loves her. Rajiv initially fumbles but eventually confesses his feelings. Lali also declares that she is in love with him, and Arun arranges for their wedding. In the meantime, Lali arrives at Rajiv's place but cannot find him. She searches for him and discovers him with Mangli, his maid, by a brook. Lali assumes that Rajiv is having an affair with Mangli and intends to marry her only for her wealth. On their wedding day, Lali confronts Rajiv, declaring that she is no longer willing to marry him because she thinks that he is a fraud and a hypocrite.

Mangli visits Lali and reveals that she accidentally fell into the brook and Rajiv saved her. Lali, now repentant, arrives at Rajiv's place but discovers that he has left without saying where he was going. Dejected, Lali goes on a pilgrimage to find solace. Standing on the bank of a river, she feels that her life has become meaningless. Feeling guilty, she throws herself into the river but is saved by people nearby. When she regains consciousness, she meets an elderly woman and tells her everything about her life. The woman endeavors to reinstate her faith and hope. Coincidentally, Rajiv appears and it is revealed that he is the woman's son. Lali cries and falls at his feet. Rajiv forgives her, and they reunite.

== Cast ==
- Debashree Roy as Lali Chaudhury
- Shashi Puri as Rajiv Mathur
- Benjamin Gilani as Arun Chaudhary
- Naaz as Shobha
- Rakesh Bedi as Pyare, Servant
- Iftekhar as Mr Chaudhary, Lali's father
- Kishore Kapoor as Prakash Khatri
- Rajendra Nath as Dr.Gupta
- Sulochana Latkar as Rajiv's Mother
- Shivraj as Kaka
- Jankidas as Antique Shop Owner
- Pallavi Dutt (Introducing - her first film)
- Mohan Choti as Municipal Dog Catcher
- Ashok Saraf as Manu, Cyclerickshaw Driver
- Viju Khote as Horse Trainer
- Jayshree T. as Mangli
- Junior Mehmood as Raviraj
- Dinesh Hingoo as Mohan

== Crew ==
Role	Name
Story	Mukul Dutt
Dialogue	Govind Moonis
Photography	Ishan Arya
Art direction	Maharudra Shetty
Editing	Mukhtar Ahmed
Sound	S G Rao
Choreography	Badri Prasad; Subal Sarkar
Action	Masoom Husain
Controller of production	Nand Kishore Kapoor
Production manager	P K Gupta
Publicity manager	Vinay Welling
Music composition	Raj Kamal
Producer	Tarachand Barjatya

== Soundtrack ==
The music of the film was composed by Raj Kamal. Govind Moonis wrote the lyrics.

- "Maine Tumko Hi Maa Jaana" - Haimanti Shukla, Raj Kamal
- "Chanchal Naina Mohini Chitvan" - K. J. Yesudas
- "Jao Saiyan Aise Na Churao" - Haimanti Sukla
- "Mausam Kitna Pyara Hai" - K. J. Yesudas, Haimanti Sukla
- "Sanwari Saloni Aisi" - K. J. Yesudas
- "Jaan Marelo, Goliyan Kamaal Karelo" - K. J. Yesudas
- "Jab Jab Baithe Hum Rikshe Par" - Haimanti Shukla
