= Rituparno Ghosh =

Indian film director, actor, writer, and lyricist

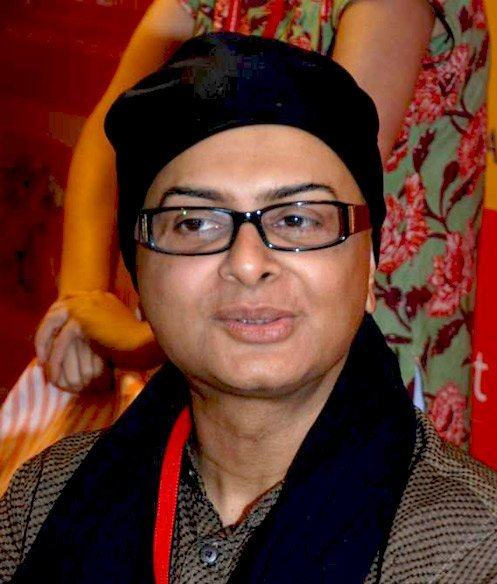
- Ghosh at MAMI festival in 2010
- Pronunciation: [ˈritupɔɾno ɡʱoʃ]
- Born: 31 August 1963; Calcutta, West Bengal, India
- Died: 30 May 2013 (aged 49); Kolkata, West Bengal, India
- Other name: Ritu
- Occupations: Director; actor; writer; lyricist
- Years active: 1992–2013

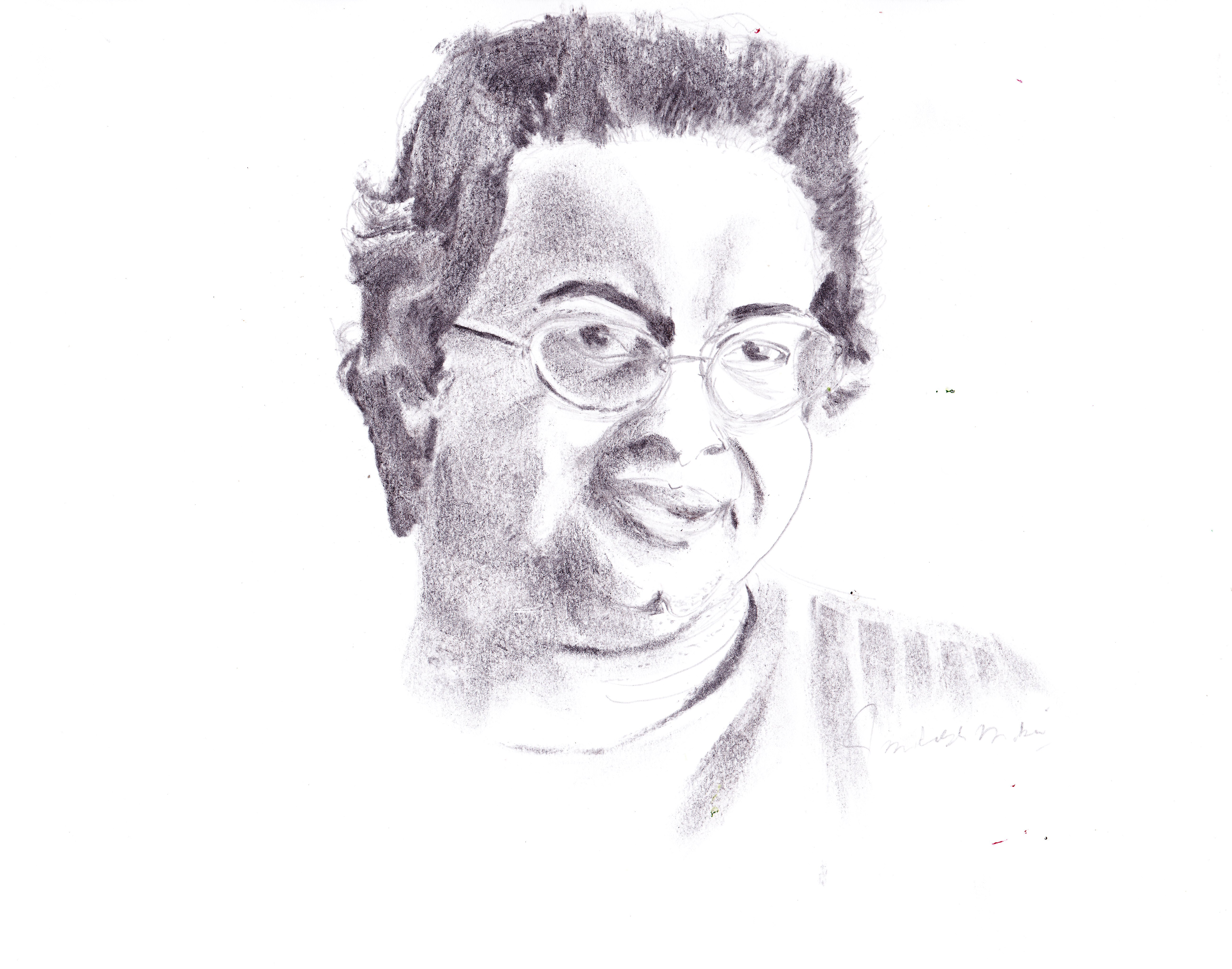
Bengali award-winning film director Rituparno Ghosh, charcoal on paper by Amitabh Mitra

Rituparno Ghosh (Bengali: [ˈritupɔɾno ɡʱoʃ]; 31 August 1963 – 30 May 2013) was an Indian film director, actor, writer and lyricist. After pursuing a degree in economics, he started his career as a creative artist at an advertising agency. He received recognition for his second feature film Unishe April which won the National Film Award for Best Feature Film. Having won 19 National Awards, along with his contemporaries Aparna Sen and Goutam Ghose, Rituparno heralded contemporary Bengali cinema to greater heights. Ghosh died on 30 May 2013 in Kolkata after a heart attack. Ghosh was one of the openly homosexual personalities in Indian cinema.

Ghosh was influenced by the works of Satyajit Ray and was an avid reader of Rabindranath Tagore. Tagore's works are frequently referenced to in his films. He also made a documentary titled Jeevan Smriti on the life of Tagore. In his career spanning almost two decades, he won 12 national and numerous international awards. His unreleased Bengali movie Sunglass (also known as Taak Jhaank) was honoured and released at the 19th Kolkata International Film Festival.

== Personal life ==
Rituparno Ghosh was born in a Bengali family on 31 August 1963 in Kolkata. His birth name was Souranil Ghosh. His father, Sunil Ghosh, was a documentary film maker and painter. He completed his schooling at South Point School, and earned a degree in economics from the Jadavpur University, Kolkata. He also had a master's degree in economics from the same university. He was one of the few openly LGBT figures in Indian cinema and is considered an icon of the queer community of India.

== Advertising ==
Before his career in film, Rituparno Ghosh worked at the Response India advertising agency and became known as an especially effective copywriter in Kolkata. He was particularly noted for composing succinct, appealing one-liners and slogans for ad campaigns in Bengali during the 1980s. At the time, the trend in Kolkata was to translate all-India advertisement campaigns originally composed in English and Hindi into Bengali. Ghosh won recognition for his ability to initiate campaigns in Bengali. Among his noted ad campaigns were Sharad Samman and Bongo Jiboner Ango for the antiseptic ointment, Boroline, and others for Frooti, the largest-selling mango drink in India. Some commentators noted that his power to appeal to consumers through ad campaigns helped make his films appealing to wider audiences, particularly to middle class Bengalis. In 1990, Rituparno received his first break in documentary filmmaking when his own agency, Tele-Response, a member of the Response family of companies, was commissioned to make a documentary on Vande Mataram for Doordarshan.

== Film career ==
=== Direction ===
==== 1992–2003 ====
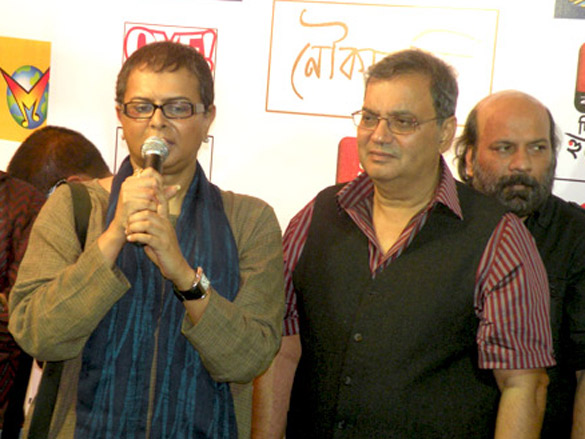
Rituparno Ghosh (left) with Subhash Ghai (right) and Debojyoti Mishra (behind) at the audio release of Noukadubi

Ghosh made his directorial debut in the feature film Hirer Angti which was released in 1992, a family-friendly film based on a novel written by Shirshendu Mukhopadhyay about inheritance and conjuring tricks, and starring Moon Moon Sen, Basanta Choudhury, and others

His second film, Unishe April, starring Aparna Sen, Debashree Roy, Prosenjit Chatterjee and Dipankar Dey, with a soundtrack composed by Jyotishka Dasgupta, was released in 1994, and won two National Film Awards in 1995, including Best Feature Film. It portrayed the relationship of an award-winning dancer and her emotionally abandoned daughter, who aspires to be a doctor. This film received both critical acclaim and commercial success. His next film, Dahan, released in 1997. won Ghosh the National Film Award for Best Screenplay Dahan was based on the true story of a woman who was molested on a street in Kolkata, and of another woman, a witness who came forward to bring legal action against the perpetrators, but became frustrated by the callousness of society, including the victim's family.

Bariwali, released in 2000, starring Kirron Kher, Rupa Ganguly and Chiranjeet Chakraborty, portrayed a lonely and withdrawn middle-aged woman (Kirron Kher) who rents out her large house for film production and fantasises about the charming and very much married director, who flirts with her but, predictably, disappoints her. Kher won National Film Award for Best Actress. In the 1999 film Asukh, Ghosh dealt with the relationship between a young film star and her father who must depend unwillingly on his daughter's earnings. The film won National Film Award for Best Feature Film in Bengali.

Ghosh won the National Award for Best Direction for Utsab, released in 2000. The film dealt with the decadence of a large family whose members now live away from the ancestral home, and meet only during the traditional Durga puja held on the premises. The 2002 film Titli was another narrative about a mother-daughter relationship—the teenage daughter has a crush on an older film star who, years ago, had an affair with the mother.

The 2003 film Shubho Mahurat, a whodunit based on Agatha Christie's book, The Mirror Crack'd from Side to Side, starred the veteran actresses Rakhee and Sharmila Tagore, alongside Nandita Das, in major roles. The same year, Ghosh released his film Chokher Bali, based on a novel written by Rabindranath Tagore, in which Bollywood actress Aishwarya Rai worked with the director for the first time.

==== 2004–2013 ====
In 2004, Ghosh's first Hindi film, Raincoat, an adaptation of the short story, The Gift of the Magi (1906), by O. Henry was released. In this film he worked with Aishwarya Rai again. The shooting of the film was completed in 17 days. This film received National Film Award for Best Feature Film in Hindi award. It was later adapted in English by Mithaq kazimi.

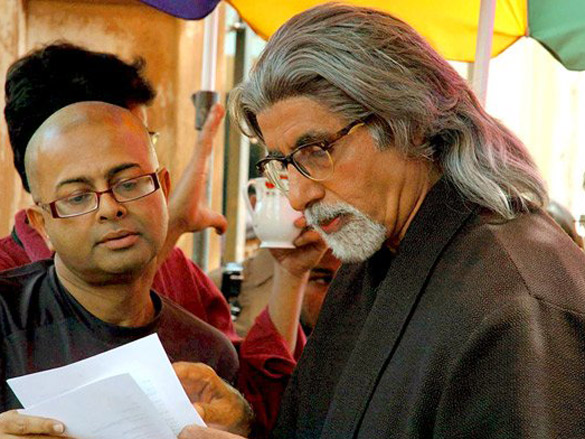
Rituparno Ghosh with Amitabh Bachchan (right) at the set of The Last Lear

In 2005 the Bengali film, Antar Mahal was released. The film was set in British India and revolved around a land-owning or zamindari family. Jackie Shroff played the Zamindar. Soha Ali Khan and Roopa Ganguly played the Zaminder's wives.

Ghosh's 2007 film, The Last Lear, revolved around the life of a retired Shakespearean theatre actor, with Amitabh Bachchan in the lead role, and with Preity Zinta and Arjun Rampal playing supporting roles.

The 2008 film, Khela, was Manisha Koirala's debut film in Bengali cinema. Later the same year, Shob Charitro Kalponik, starring Bipasha Basu and Prosenjit, was released, and won the National Award for Best Film in Bengali.

In 2009, Ghosh's film Abohomaan, starring Jisshu Sengupta, Ananya Chatterjee, Dipankar Dey, and Mamata Shankar, was released, and won him the National film award for Best Director in Bengali for this film.

Just before he died, he had finished production work on his last film, Satyanweshi, based on Bengali detective Byomkesh Bakshi.

=== Acting career ===
Rituparno Ghosh made his first screen appearance in an Oriya film, Katha Deithilli Ma Ku, which was directed by Himanshu Parija and released in 2003. In 2011, he acted in two Bengali films— Arekti Premer Golpo directed by Kaushik Ganguly, which dealt with queer relationships, and Memories in March directed by Sanjoy Nag.

Chitrangada (2012) was Ghosh's last film to be released. Loosely based on Rabindranath Tagore's work 'Chitrangada', this film received the special jury award at the 60th National Film Awards.

== Other activities ==
=== Television ===
Rituparno Ghosh hosted two celebrity chat shows, Ebong Rituporno on ETV Bangla and Ghosh & Co. on Star Jalsha. He was the scriptwriter of Gaaner Opare. Ghosh had planned a 13-episodes long television series based on Miss Marple, featuring the character of Ranga Pishima from his film, Shubho Mahurat. Titled Tahar Namti Ranjana, it remained unfinished on his death. Star Jalsha telecasted the only finished episode from the planned series posthumously in June 2013.

=== Literary career ===
Rituparno Ghosh was the editor of the Bengali film magazine, Anandalok from 1997 to 2004. He was also the editor of Robbar magazine of Sangbad Pratidin from 2006 till his death.

== Death ==
Rituparno suffered from diabetes mellitus type 2 for ten years, and pancreatitis for five years. He experienced insomnia and had been taking medication for it. According to Rajiv Seal of Fortis Hospitals, who had been his physician for almost two decades, Rituparno was also facing complications from hormone treatments after abdominoplasty and breast implants operations.

Ghosh died at his Kolkata residence on 30 May 2013, following a massive heart attack. His attendants, Dileep and Bishnu, found him lying unconscious in bed. Nilanjana Sengupta, wife of actor Jisshu Sengupta, sent for Nirup Mitra, who declared Ghosh dead. Ghosh was 49 years old.

Many Bengali film actors and directors went to Ghosh's residence to pay tribute. In the afternoon his body was taken to Nandan and kept outside the Nandan complex for some time to allow his fans to see him one last time. Thousands of people came to Nandan to pay homage. Then his body was taken to Tollygunge Technician Studios, where West Bengal's Chief Minister Mamata Banerjee spoke of him in tribute. From Tollygunge, Ghosh's body was taken to Siriti cremation ground where his funeral took place. He was given gun salute by Kolkata Police before cremation.

=== Reactions and tributes ===
Bengali film industry

Bengali actor Soumitra Chatterjee said "I cannot believe that Rituparno is no more. It is very difficult to accept this news. We lost a very promising film director at a very early age." Konkona Sen Sharma, who acted in Ghosh's Titli and Dosar, said that Ghosh's death was a great personal loss for her. Actor Arindam Sil requested to observe the day as a day of national mourning. Dev said he was speechless after getting the news. Rituparna Sengupta described Ghosh as a creative genius who had enriched the Bengali film industry emotionally and culturally.

Bollywood film industry

Amitabh Bachchan remembered Ghosh as the only director who had worked with every member of the Bachchan family. He tweeted, "Ghosh was a sensitive artistic minded gentle human being." For actress Bipasha Basu it was heartbreaking news, difficult to believe. Film director Shyam Benegal said, Ghosh's death was a "huge tragedy". Soha Ali Khan described Ghosh as one in the vanguard of Bengali cinema who created a link between Satyajit Ray and a new school of Bengali filmmakers. To Arjun Rampal, Ghosh was "a master of his craft" and a wonderful man. Actress Kirron Kher remembered his childlike wonder and added, "In the film world, which is replete with ignorant people, Ritu was a very well-read man. He had a library of his own and would study religiously. His knowledge was unparalleled."

International film industry

The Indian consulate in Bangladesh held a retrospective and Afghan-American director Mithaq Kazimi wrote his reactions via his personal blog and commented on Ghosh's influence beyond India on a number of newspapers.

== Cinematic vision ==
Rituparno Ghosh was one of the most acclaimed film directors of India, and was himself an admirer of Satyajit Ray. His films glorified womanhood and closely and sensitively portrayed women's lives, feelings and sufferings. According to Bollywood actor Anupam Kher, Ghosh had wonderful understanding of the female psyche. In his last films he addressed issues of homosexuality and gender.

An article in the newspaper Live Mint categorised Ghosh's cinematic career in three phases: In his early films, he tried to portray Bengali middle-class lives, their aspirations and desires; in the second phase, he mainly worked with Bollywood actors and made films in Hindi and English as well as Bengali; in the third and the last phase his movies mainly dealt with sexuality.

Rituparno Ghosh had deep interests in the classics and made multiple films of Rabindranath Tagore's works. According to film-maker Goutam Ghose—

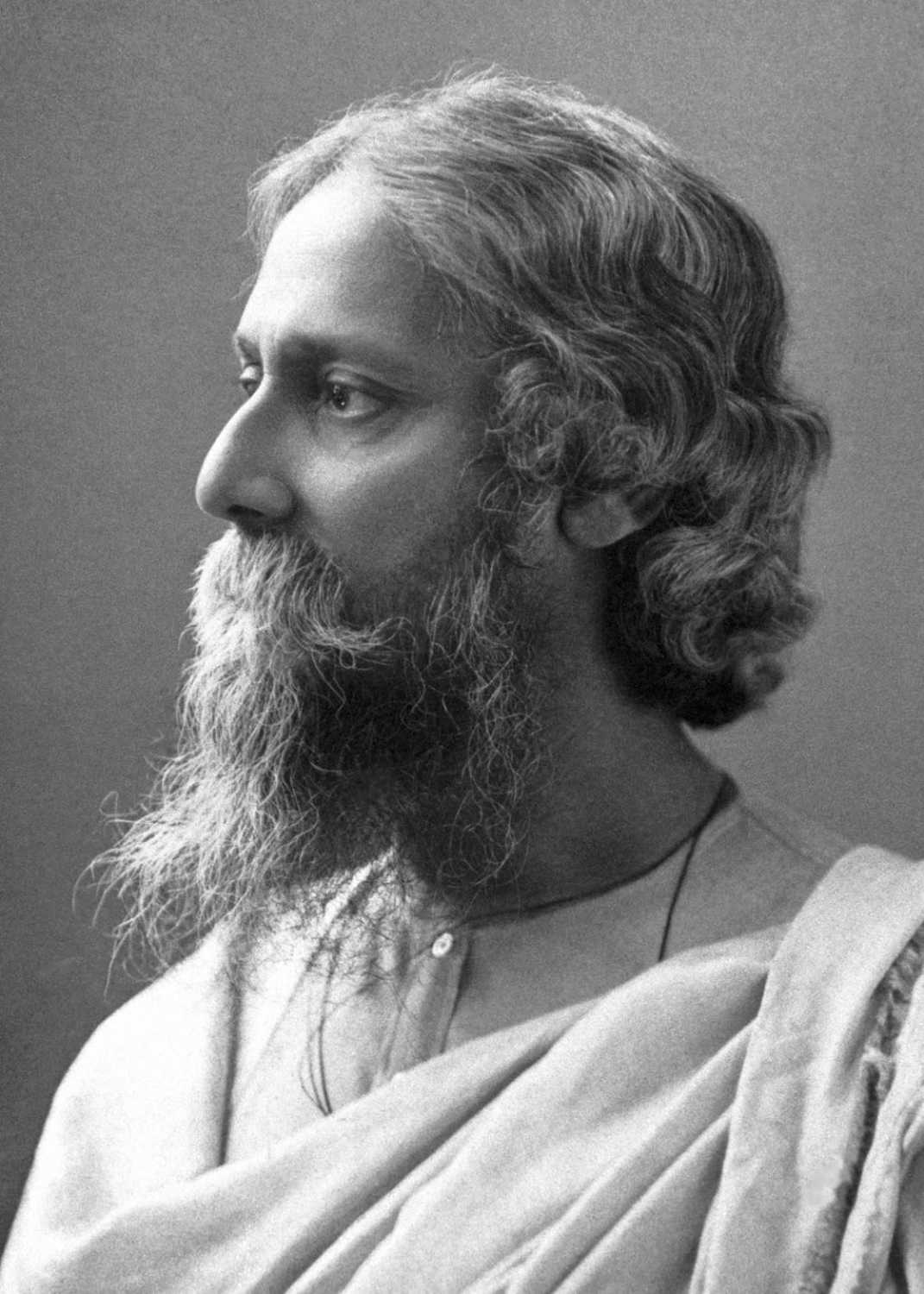
Rituparno Ghosh was a researcher and admirer of Rabindranath Tagore (pictured).

His films, with their sensitive portrayal of human relationships, anguish, trauma and love in a fast-changing, post-liberalisation India charmed audiences. His brilliant story-telling reflected contemporary society like never before. While his death creates a tremendous void that can never be filled, Rituparno's work blazed a trail that has paved the way for an entire generation of filmmakers who have dared to be different. It was Rituparno who gave them the courage.
... ...
He looked at ordinary middle-class relationships from an angle that had never been explored. For example, the mother-daughter relationship in 'Unishe April' was refreshing, yet realistic in a society that was going through churning.

Goutam Ghose also felt that Rituparno Ghosh was the best film director of his generation. He directed and as well as acted in such films which tried to reject the concept that homosexual relationship is all about a physical relationship. He said in an interview in 2010— "There is much more to such relationships. Same-sex relationships, too, are extremely soulful, emotional and have the same pathos that any heterosexual relationship has."

Bengali film director Mrinal Sen said that whenever he thought of direction, the name that came to mind was Rituparno Ghosh. According to Sen, Ghosh's contribution to Indian cinema will be remembered forever. The independent film critic Saibal Chatterjee, in an article in The Hindu, described the way Ghosh mixed the literary traditions of Bengal with modern-day sensibility, thereby transcending the confines of region. Chatterjee praised Ghosh for his brave and empathetic treatment of "alternative sexuality" as actor in Arekti Premer Golpo and Memories in March, and as director-actor in Chitrangada.

=== Ghosh's exploration of Tagore's works ===
Ghosh was a researcher and admirer of Rabindranath Tagore. He made three films directly based on literary works of Rabindranath Tagore— Choker Bali (2003), Noukadubi (2010) and Chitrangada (2012). In the film Asukh (1999) Tagore played an invisible role. In 2012, Ghosh made a documentary based on Tagore's autobiography, 'Jiban Smriti', for the Government of India Ministry of Culture.

In an interview in August 2012, Ghosh spoke about Tagore— "What comes through is what a lonely man Tagore was – from childhood to old age. There is no one in his life to share even his success with him. It's the journey of a lonely traveller. What I haven't captured in the documentary is what a fun-loving, humorous man he could be. I show him as a profound thinker, a guru – but then this was perhaps necessary for an audience which is not at all familiar with Rabindranath."

== Filmography ==
Year	Title	Language	Role			Notes	Ref.
Year	Title	Language	Direction	Screenplay	Acting	Notes	Ref.
1992	Hirer Angti	Bengali	Yes	Yes		Directorial debut, based on Shirshendu Mukhopadhyay's novel	
1994	Unishe April	Bengali	Yes	Yes		National Film Award for Best Feature Film; National Film Award for Best Actress – Debashree Roy	
1997	Bahanno Episode	Bengali	Yes	Yes		TV series	
1997	Dahan	Bengali	Yes	Yes		National Film Award for Best Feature Film in Bengali; National Film Award for Best Screenplay – Rituparno Ghosh; National Film Award for Best Actress – Indrani Halder, Rituparna Sengupta	
1999	Bariwali	Bengali	Yes	Yes		National Film Award for Best Actress – Kirron Kher; National Film Award for Best Supporting Actress – Sudipta Chakraborty	
1999	Asukh	Bengali	Yes	Yes		National Film Award for Best Feature Film in Bengali	
2000	Utsab	Bengali	Yes	Yes		National Film Award for Best Direction	
2001	Obhinoy	Bengali	Yes	Yes		Telefilm	
2002	Titli	Bengali	Yes	Yes			
2003	Shubho Mahurat	Bengali	Yes	Yes		National Film Award for Best Supporting Actress – Raakhee; National Film Award for Best Feature Film in Bengali	
2003	Chokher Bali	Bengali	Yes	Yes		National Film Award for Best Feature Film in Bengali	
2003	Raincoat	Hindi	Yes	Yes		National Film Award for Best Feature Film in Hindi	
2005	Antarmahal	Bengali	Yes	Yes			
2006	Dosar	Bengali	Yes	Yes		National Film Awards – Special Jury Award – Prosenjit Chatterjee	
2006	Kuri Nombor Malatibala Lane	Bengali	Yes				
2007	The Last Lear	English	Yes	Yes		National Film Award for Best Feature Film in English; National Film Award for Best Supporting Actress – Shefali Shah	
2008	Khela	Bengali	Yes	Yes			
2008	Shob Charitro Kalponik	Bengali	Yes	Yes		National Film Award for Best Feature Film in Bengali	
2010	Abohomaan	Bengali	Yes	Yes		National Film Award for Best Direction – Rituparno Ghosh; National Film Award for Best Feature Film in Bengali; National Film Award for Best Actress – Ananya Chatterjee	
2010	Arekti Premer Golpo	Bengali			Yes	Directed by Kaushik Ganguly, dealt with queer relationship	
2010	Memories in March	English		Yes	Yes	National Film Award for Best Feature Film in English	
2010	Mumbai Cutting	Hindi	Yes				
2010-11	Gaaner Oparey	Bengali		Yes		Television series aired by Star Jalsha; aired 251 episodes.	
2011	Noukadubi	Bengali	Yes	Yes		He dubbed for Amu Chatterjee	
2012	Chitrangada	Bengali	Yes	Yes	Yes	National Film Awards – Special Jury Award	
2013	Tahar Namti Ranjana	Bengali	Yes	Yes		Unfinished 13-episodic television series reviving Ranga Pishima's character from Shubho Mahurat. Star Jalsha telecasted the only finished episode posthumously.	
2013	Jeevan Smriti: Selected Memories	Bengali	Yes	Yes	Yes	Documentary on Rabindranath Tagore's life, produced by the Ministry of Culture. Telecasted posthumously by Doordarshan.	
2013	Satyanweshi	Bengali	Yes	Yes		Released posthumously.	
2013	Sunglass	Hindi	Yes	Yes		Released posthumously at the 19th Kolkata International Film Festival inauguration in 2013.	

== Awards ==
Award	Year	Film	Category	Status
National Film Awards	1995	Unishe April	National Film Award for Best Feature Film	Won
National Film Awards	1998	Dahan	National Film Award for Best Screenplay and National Film Award for Best Feature Film in Bengali	Won
National Film Awards	2000	Asukh	National Film Award for Best Feature Film in Bengali	Won
National Film Awards	2001	Utsab	National Film Award for Best Direction	Won
National Film Awards	2003	Shubho Mahurat	National Film Award for Best Feature Film in Bengali	Won
National Film Awards	2004	Chokher Bali	National Film Award for Best Feature Film in Bengali	Won
National Film Awards	2005	Raincoat	National Film Award for Best Feature Film in Hindi	Won
National Film Awards	2008	The Last Lear	National Film Award for Best Feature Film in English	Won
National Film Awards	2009	Sob Charitro Kalponik	National Film Award for Best Feature Film in Bengali	Won
National Film Awards	2010	Abohoman	National Film Award for Best Direction	Won
National Film Awards	2010	Abohoman	National Film Award for Best Feature Film in Bengali	Won
National Film Awards	2012	Chitrangada	National Film Awards – Special Jury Award	Won
Bombay International Film Festival	1999	Asukh	FIPRESCI Prize (Special Mention)	Won
Bombay International Film Festival	2002	Titli	FIPRESCI Prize (Jury Prize)	Won
Bombay International Film Festival	2003	Shubho Mahurat	Best Indian film	Nominated
Berlin International Film Festival	2000	Bariwali	NETPAC Award	Won
Kalakar Awards	1997	Unishe April	5th Kalakar Award for Best Director	Won
Kalakar Awards	2011	Arekti Premer Golpo	19th Kalakar Award for Best Actor	Won
Tele Cine Awards	2011	Arekti Premer Golpo	11th Tele Cine Awards special award for Extraordinary Performance in an Exceptional Character	Won
Pusan International Film Festival	1996	Unishe April	New Currents Award	Nominated
Locarno International Film Festival	2003	Chokher Bali	Golden Leopard	Nominated
Locarno International Film Festival	2005	Antarmahal	Golden Leopard	Nominated
International Film Festival of Kerala	2005	Antarmahal	Golden Crow Pheasant	Nominated
Karlovy Vary International Film Festival	1998	Dahan	Crystal Globe	Nominated
Karlovy Vary International Film Festival	2004	Raincoat	Crystal Globe	Nominated
Deauville Asian Film Festival	2010	Abohoman	Best film— Lotus	Nominated
Chicago International Film Festival	2003	Chokher Bali	Gold Hugo	Nominated

== See also ==
- Anjan Das
- Subrata Sen
- Kaushik Ganguly
- Srijit Mukherji
