= Asukh =

- Directed by: Rituparno Ghosh
- Produced by: D. Rama Naidu
- Starring: Soumitra Chatterjee; Debashree Roy; Arpita Pal; Silajit Majumder; Shankar Chakraborty; Gouri Ghosh
- Cinematography: Avik Mukhopadhyay
- Edited by: Arghyakamal Mitra
- Music by: Debojyoti Mishra
- Production company: Suresh Productions
- Release date: 20 August 1999
- Country: India
- Language: Bengali

Asukh (Note: Pronounced as 'Oshukh') (lit. 'Illness') is a 1999 Indian Bengali feature film directed by Rituparno Ghosh. The film was awarded in the Best Feature Film in Bengali category at the 46th National Film Awards.

== Plot ==
Rohini asks her ex-boyfriend if he remembers her. Although he says yes, she doesn't believe him and instead asks for the medicine box and takes three to five sleeping pills. Even after Aniruddha forbids her, she takes them all, saying that it should not affect him. The reason for this bitterness is revealed. Aniruddha had left her for another girl named Mrittika. Rohini was a famous film star and her love for her man was unblemished. She had brought Mrittika into the industry, and suffered Caesar's wounds when Aniruddha started an affair with her. When Mrittika and Aniruddha started coming close, Rohini had confronted Aniruddha several times to tell the truth but he always tried to hide the fact and that had hurt her more. While she was facing such turbulent times in her life and wanted to be all alone, she learns that her mother is hospitalized with a high fever.

Unaware of the deteriorating relationship among Aniruddha and Rohini, her father often asks help from him despite Rohini showing irritation. She does not express her emotions as she knows her father is also going through tough times, nor is she able to digest the fact that Aniruddha is called off and on. She tries to avoid him, as we see couple of times, she lies to avoid him and even does not pick up any call assuming it to be Aniruddha. On the other hand, on seeing a difference in Rohini's behavior her father is upset; he even finds her taking frequent sleeping pills and is worried about her. Ghosh neatly brings in the father-daughter relationship –he shows how the father worries about his daughter even after she has grown up. There is a scene in the movie which shows that, when there is a power cut, her father doesn't allow her daughter to move, going himself to fetch the torch to light up the place, similarly like a father showing light of right path to their children. He didn't think that he himself can be hurt, but only thought to protect his child from the darkness just like a shield. There are some more scenes where Ghosh brilliantly brought out the pure love of a father for his daughter. In contrast, he also shows that even though her father is unwilling to take her money, he still has to depend on her, and this constantly bothers him, which is seen when he expresses his views to his wife that they are depending on her money completely.

The film also shows how a husband loves his wife; he is not only worried about her but also sad at the same time that she is far from him and suffering from pain. Despite being old himself, he never missed to go to the hospital one single day, buying all the medicines and other necessary itinerary. Due to her daughter's fame, when he was allowed to stay longer during visiting hours, the happiness in his face explained his love for his wife. Even Rohini quotes several times that even after she got betrayal and disappointment from her relation, she keeps consoling herself when she sees her parents; their relationship makes her feel that love has not vanished from the society, it's still present. But destiny plays it role and we are unable to predict the future. The same Rohini who thought of her parents' relation as pure, started doubting her father after her mother is attacked by fever again after the discharge from the hospital. They thought of taking second opinion and the doctor suggested for HIV test as he think this may be due to lack of immunity. The hatred was installed in her mind after getting betrayed by Aniruddha and she was unable to think rationally. She started thinking for the worst, repeatedly asking her father if the needles used were sterilized and on getting the same answer from him every time (that he himself bought the disposable injections every time), her mind was shrouded in doubt that her father was the only source for her mother's illness. Ghosh, may be for the first time, brought in to the Bengali cinemas the awareness for AIDS and at the same time dealt with fear and anxiety in a sensitive manner. The rude behavior of the daughter brings a distance between them but still father's love for her daughter did not diminish.

The blood test result revealed that her mother does not have AIDS. At the end, Rohini realizes her mistake; she realizes that everything is in one's mind, and people themselves can control that. She expresses all her sorrow to her father, when he learns that Aniruddha has left her. Her father consoles her but asks is she the person who said in an interview that there is no more love and trust left in the society. She says nothing but begs pardon from her father.

== Cast ==
- Soumitra Chatterjee as Sudhamoy/Rohini's father
- Debashree Roy as Rohini
- Gouri Ghosh as Rohini's mother
- Arpita Pal
- Silajit Majumder

== Awards ==
The film won the National Film Award for Best Feature Film in Bengali at the 46th National Film Awards. The film also won the FIPRESCI Prize (Special Mention) at Bombay International Film Festival.
