= Subrata Sen =

Indian film director

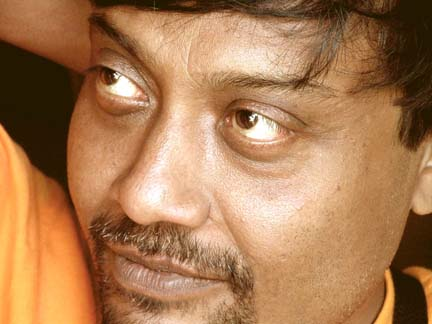
- Born: 29 May 1963 (age 61); Kolkata, West Bengal, India
- Occupation(s): Film director, film producer, screenwriter
- Website: www.filmwallah.in

Notes
- Banner: FILMWALLAH, Subrata Sen Communications

Subrata Sen (Bengali: সুব্রত সেন), (born 29 May 1963) is a Bengali Indian film director, screenwriter, novelist and producer.

== Biography ==
=== Early life ===
Subrata Sen was born in Kolkata in 1963. He went to South Point High School and graduated in physics from Presidency College, then affiliated with the University of Calcutta. After a brief stint in a bank as an officer, he joined journalism in 1987 in Anandabazar Patrika, the largest circulated daily in India. He shifted from Anandabazar Patrika to The Statesman in 1992, then he joined Banglalive dot com, an internet magazine where he remained until he made his first film Ek Je Achhe Kanya (The Girl) in 2001. His wife Parongama Sen is a Physicist of international repute.

=== Films ===
Ek Je Achhe Kanya, also known as The Girl in English is Subrata Sen's first film, which made waves in Bengal and India. It won massive critical acclaim and at the same time was a major success story in the commercial arena. This movie is said to be influenced by a Hollywood movie The Crush starring Alicia Silverstone. The movie also saw the debut performance of Konkona Sen Sharma and earned an entry into the Karlovy Vary Film Festival, besides winning the Gollapudi Srinivas National Award for a debut director.

His follow-up film, 2002's ...And They Dared to Dream known as Swapner Feriwala in Bengali—while commercially not as successful as The Girl, earned Sen some shelf-life in international arena, including an inclusion into that year's Karlovy Vary Film Festival line-up, proving Sen to be an emerging maverick of Bengali and Indian cinema.

Sen's third movie Vacation Blues, known as Nil Nirjane in Bengali was made in 2003 and was the first digital movie to be made in India. The movie became a cult among the young population in Bengal, despite attracting flak from orthodox critics because of a liplock scene between two young females. The film won the Best Experimental Film award at the Down Under Film Festival, Australia.

Sen based his fourth and fifth movies on Bengali literature. His fourth movie Hotath Neerar Jonnyo (Suddenly for Nira) was made in 2005, based on a short story by Sunil Gangopadhyay. The movie faced problems from the Indian Censor Board because of some reported explicit scenes and was commercially released only after a few shots were deleted.

Sen's fifth movie Bibar (Calcutta Unabashed) made in 2006 was based on a controversial Bengali classic by Samaresh Basu. The film won the best actor and best actress awards at the Osian Cinefan, New Delhi—the international film festival of Asian films.

Koyekti Meyer Golpo released in domestic circle in 2012 and received flak from local critics. However, it won an entry into the competition section of Madrid International Film Festival 2013 and had nominations in Best Feature Film category and Best Costume Design. It eventually won an award in the Best Costume Design category.

Sen's films are said to be the beginning of "urban genre" of Bengali films and are now course material in plenty of film schools in India. Though not as famous as his seniors beyond his home-state Bengal, Sen is the maverick filmmaker of Indian Cinema whose work, as felt in Karlovy Vary Film Festival catalogue, strongly resembles that of Pedro Almodóvar.

=== Influences and impact ===
Sen never had any formal training in film-making. He describes making of Ek Je Achhe Kanya his first training ground. However, as a child, he came in close contact with Satyajit Ray, the master Indian filmmaker, while writing for Sandesh, a children's magazine which the maestro edited. It was probably Ray's over towering influence in childhood, which initiated Sen into delving in filmmaking.

But despite his close association with Ray, Sen has consciously avoided Ray's style of filmmaking. "Ray is a fixation of Indian Filmmakers. We have to get out of his influence and make movies which are different", he says.

Besides Ray, the person whose style influenced Sen the most was Jean-Luc Godard. "We have to break all forms and all moulds to make Bengali film survive. Godard is our ideal", is Sen's frank admission. Incidentally Subrata Sen's second film, Swapner Feriwala, is a tribute to Godard.

His first film, "Ek Je Achhe Kanya" has been acknowledged by the Jadavpur University as the "First New wave Film" for the young generation in the post Satyajit Ray era. The film has been included in the university's Film Studies course from 2002.

== Filmography ==
The following is the list of films directed by Subrata Sen. For many of these movies, Subrata Sen is also credited for the story, screenplay:

=== Director ===
Year	Film	Language	Cast
2001	Ek Je Achhe Kanya	Bengali	Konkona Sen Sharma, Sabyasachi Chakrabarty, Debashree Roy
2002	Swapner Feriwala	Bengali	Subrat Dutta, Ferdous Ahmed, Nilanjana Sharma, Dipankar De
2003	Nil Nirjane	Bengali	Moonmoon Sen, Raima Sen, June Malia
2004	Hotath Neerar Jonnyo	Bengali	Bickram Ghosh, Jaya Seal, Tina Majumdar
2006	Bibar	Bengali	Subrat Dutta, Tannistha Chatterjee, Payel Sarkar
Unreleased	Nondinee	Bengali	Swastika Mukherjee, Mir Asaf Ali, Others
2012	Those City Girls	Bengali	Raima Sen, Subrat Dutta, Parno Mittra, Tanusree, Mumtaz Sorcar, Locket Chatterjee, Sanjoy Sinharoy
2014	Sada Canvas	Bengali	Paoli Dam, Rohit Roy, Malobika Banerjee, Mumtaz Sorcar, Locket Chatterjee, Aparajita Ghosh
2015	Mister Bhaduri	Bengali	Rahul Banerjee, Malobika Banerjee, Aparajita Ghosh
2018	Kali (Documentary)	Bengali	Nimisha, Aparajita Ghosh
2020	Punglingo Strilingo	Bengali	Rahul Banerjee
2023	Projapoti	Bengali	Rwitobroto Mukherjee, Mumtaz Sorcar, Subrat Dutta

=== Writer and novelist ===
Subrata Sen has written the stories for five of his movies, namely Ek Je Acche Kanya, Swapner Feriwala, Nil Nirjane, Nondinee and Koyekti Meyer Golpo and is the scriptwriter of all his movies. He is the writer and scriptwriter of all his television fiction work too. He has not worked on anyone else's script so far. Subrata Sen also has four published Bengali novels to his credit, namely Joubon Japon (ISBN 978-81-7756-935-3), Dakbakshe Nil Kham (ISBN 978-81-7756-865-3), Chhayanot (ISBN 978-81-8374-261-0) and Banvasi (ISBN )

=== Story and screenplay ===
Subrata Sen often writes both story and screenplay of his films, apart from Bibar and Hotath Neerar Jonnyo. Bibar was based on famous Bengali writer Samaresh Basu's novel. Whereas Hotath Neerar Jonnyo was adapted from a short story of another famous writer Sunil Gangopadhyay.
