= Prajapati (disambiguation) =

Prajapati is a Vedic deity of Hinduism.

Prajapati may also refer to:

== Religion ==
=== Hindu deities ===
- Agni, god of fire
- Daksha, god of ritual
- Brahma, god of creation
- Indra, king of the devas
- Vishvakarma, divine architect of the devas

=== Buddhism ===
- Mahapajapati Gotami, foster mother of The Buddha

== Arts and entertainment ==
- Prajapati (novel), a 1967 Bengali-language novel by Indian writer Samaresh Basu
  - Prajapati (film), a 1993 Indian Bengali-language film adaptation by Biplab Chatterjee
- Prajapathi, a 2006 Indian Malayalam-language action drama film by Ranjith

== People ==
- Kumhar, a caste or community in India, Nepal and Pakistan, sometimes referred to as "Prajapati"
  - Vataliya Prajapati, a Hindu subcaste of the Kumhar

=== Given name ===
- Prajapati Mishra (1898–1952), Indian politician
- Prajapati Trivedi (born 1953), Indian economist

=== Surname ===
- Tulsiram Prajapati (died 2005), Indian man killed in custody
- Aryan Prajapati (born 2008), Indian child actor
- Maharaji Prajapati, Indian politician
- Gayatri Prasad Prajapati, Indian politician, convicted of rape and imprisoned
- Sunil Prajapati, Nepalese politician
- Kashyap Prajapati (born 1995), Indian-born cricketer
- Archana Prajapati (born 1996 or 1997), Indian actress and model
- Arjun Prajapati (1957–2020), Indian artist
- Brajesh Kumar Prajapati, Indian politician
- N. P. Prajapati (1958), Indian politician
- Shivcharan Prajapati, Indian politician
- M. R. Prajapati, Indian rural innovator and inventor
- Govind Prajapati, Indian politician
- Dharmveer Prajapati (born 1963), Indian politician
- Ranbir Singh Prajapati (born 1964), Indian politician
- Deepika Prajapati (born 1994), Indian archer
- Shailesh Prajapati actor of Ernie, a supporting character in Power Rangers Megaforce
- Bala Prajapathi Adikalar, religious figure in Ayyavazhi

== Other ==
- Prajapati Halt railway station, a railway station in Bihar, India
- Prajapati Nagar metro station, of the Nagpur Metro in Nagpur, India
- Daksh Prajapati temple, a Hindu temple dedicated to Lord Shiva in Uttarakhand, India
- Delta Aurigae or Prajapati, a star

== See also ==
- Projapoti (disambiguation)
- Painted bat, also known as "butterfly bat" (Projapoti Badur)
