= Sidhu (musician) =

Indian musician

Siddartha Ray
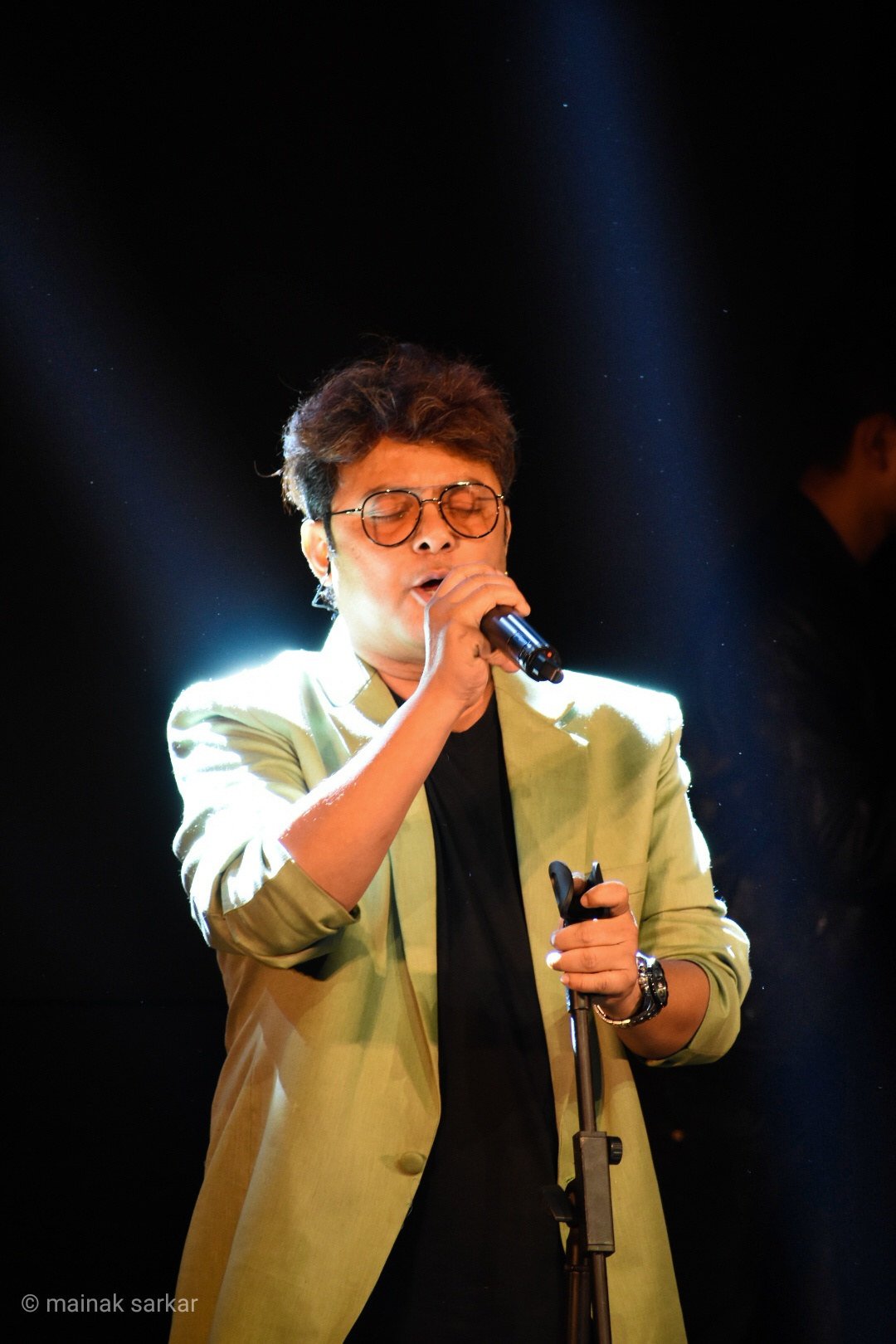
- Ray performing live in Kolkata
- Born: Kolkata
- Other name: Sidhu
- Occupations: singer; lyricist; composer; poet; doctor
- Years active: 1992–present

Siddhartha Sankar "Sidhu" Ray is an Indian singer, lyricist, composer, playback writer, and actor from Kolkata, West Bengal. He is a producer of the Bangla Rock genre. Prior to pursuing his career in music, Ray left his dream profession of being a doctor at and formed the band Cactus, of which he is the frontman. The band offered a new genre in the Bengali music scene—a Bengali rock band. Songs like "Holud Paakhi" have become a household name. Ray also hosted quiz shows as a quiz master, presented in a musical game show, and a singer as a soloist in many Bengali films. Since then, he has gone on to compose, write lyrics, and sing for his band. In 2003, he and his band made their debut in Tollywood (Bengali cinema), composing songs for Nil Nirjane. They won the Mirchi Music Awards Bangla several times. He did his schooling at St. Lawrence High School, Kolkata

== Music ==
Ray has been writing songs since his childhood days. His biggest break was the self-titled debut album of Cactus. Released in 1999 by His Master's Voice, it became a rage with a touch of blues and psychedelic rock. With numbers like Brishti, oooh Ma! and Icchamati, this album portrayed psychedelia in Bengali music for the first time. Halud pakhi, on the other hand, created a long-lasting sensation in the contemporary Bengali music scene with its nostalgic feel being perfectly accompanied by Shudhu Tumi Ele Na and Amra Bhishon Eka complementing the overall mood of the album. They tasted some success when their first self-titled album was released in 1999 by His Master's Voice.

Apart from band music, ray has many singles under his name, among them songs like "Keno emon hoy", onno corridor from album "Letters from Siliguri", Mayabini, and Buro Radio are very famous.

As a playback artist, he has also sung for many films, among them "Esho Bondhu", from the film Uma.

== Discography ==
=== Nil Nirjane (2001–2002) ===
In 2002, Cactus composed and performed the score for the Bengali movie Nil Nirjane. A Hindi version of the song was used as the intro song for Love Story, a TV series in SAB TV.

It had Sidhartha Sankar "Sidhu" Ray on vocals, Sibaji "Baji" Paul on drums, Sanjay Bhattacharya on guitar, Kanishka (Pinky) Sarkar on keyboard, Shubayan Ganguly on bass, and Abhijit Barman (Pota) on vocals.

=== Rajar Raja (2002–2004) ===
The band released its second album titled Rajar Raja in 2004. Different genres of music were experimented with within the album. Buddho Heshechhen and Lash Kata Ghore are examples of classic rock combining with folk rock in 'Bodhu re'. Songs like Udaaner Gaan, Krishti, Ude Jete Chay, and Kamalar Swami were added in.

Line up: Sidhartha Sankar "Sidhu" Ray [vocals], Sibaji "Baji" Paul [drums], Sanjay Bhattacharya [guitar], Kanishka (Pinky) Sarkar [keyboard], Sandip Roy [bass], Abhijit Barman (Pota)[vocal]

=== Tuchho (2004–2008) ===
The band released its third album, Tuccho, in 2008. The band with this album moved ahead and has incorporated new sounds. Different genres of music were experimented with in the album. They were then featured in the Rock Street Journal's February 2009 issue. Tuccho contained the hits "Bhalo Theko" and "Rater Pari".

Line up: Sidhartha Sankar "Sidhu" Ray [vocals], Sibaji "Baji" Paul [drums], Allan Ao [guitar], Sudipto Banerjee [keyboard], Sandip Roy [bass], Sayak Bandyopadhay [vocals]

=== Blah Blah Blah (2013) ===
Blah Blah Blah was their fourth album. Asha Audio produced the album, and it was published on 3 October 2013.

Line up: Sidhartha Sankar "Sidhu" Ray [vocals], Sibaji "Baji" Paul [drums], Ritaprabha "Ratul" Ray [guitar], Sudipto Banerjee [keyboard], Sandip Roy [bass], Dibyendu Mukherjee [vocal]

=== Tobuo Thik Acche (2017–2019) ===
In 2017, Abhijit Barman (Pota) left the band due to several opinionated arguments By then, the band had already started working on their next album Tobuo Thik Acche. They had to rework some of the tracks. Finally, the songs were published as music videos on their official YouTube channel from 2017 to 2019.

Line up: Siddhartha Sankar "Sidhu" Ray [vocals], Sibaji "Baji" Paul [drums], Ritaprabha "Ratul" Ray [guitar], Sudipto "Buti" Banerjee [keyboard], Mainak "Bumpy" Nag Chowdhury[bass], Saqi [vocal]

=== Singles as singer-songwriter/composer ===
Year	Title	Role
	Keno Emon Hoy	Singer
	Onno Corridor	Singer/writer/composer

== Filmography ==
=== As singer, lyricist, music director ===
Ray has worked as lyricist, music director & singer for the following films.

Year	Title	Role	Songs	Notes
2013	Nil Nirjane	Composer	Nil Nirjane, Noah, Telephone, Mon, Dukhho Medley (1st), Medley (2nd), Dhik Dina Dhaki Dina	Along with his band 'Cactus'
	Uma			
	Circle			
	Ka Kha Ga Gha			
	Kusumitra Goppo			

=== Jingles and advertisements ===
- Flipkart Big Billion Day – 2018 – Writer

== Cactus Band ==
=== Current members ===
- Sidhartha Sankar "Sidhu" Ray - Vocals
- Abhijit Barman Pata - Vocals
- Boidurjo Chowdhury - Guitar
- Samrat Mukherjee - Guitar
- Sayantan Chatterjee - Keyboard
- Prasanto Mahato - Bass
- Arnab Tabla Dasgupta - Drums

=== Past members ===
- Sanjay guitar
- Sukanti guitar
- Kanishka (Pinky) keyboard
- Shubayan bass
- Rajesh vox
- Sayak vox
- Indra keyboard
- Allan guitar
- Sandip Roy bass
- Abhirup Biswas guitar
- Subhajit Bhowmick bass
- Saqi vocals
- Shibaji Baji Paul drums
- Sudipto Buti Banerjee keyboard

== Journalism ==
Ray's writings have been featured in various online and print magazines as well as newspapers.

== Director ==
Ray has written and directed one short film, HaaBaaB, in the year 2015.

== Acting ==
Year	Title	Language	Role	Remarks
2003	Nil Nirjane	Bengali	As himself	
2014	Jaatishwar	Bengali	As himself	
2017	Samantaral	Bengali	Sambit, the psychiatrist	
2017	Khyapa 2	Bengali	As himself	Web Series
2019	Sweater	Bengali	Mrityunjan Sen	
2020	Pandab Goenda	Bengali		Soap opera
2021	Aguntuk	Bengali		
2021	Mukhosh	Bengali	Detective	Web Series
