= St. Lawrence High School, Kolkata =

St. Lawrence High School

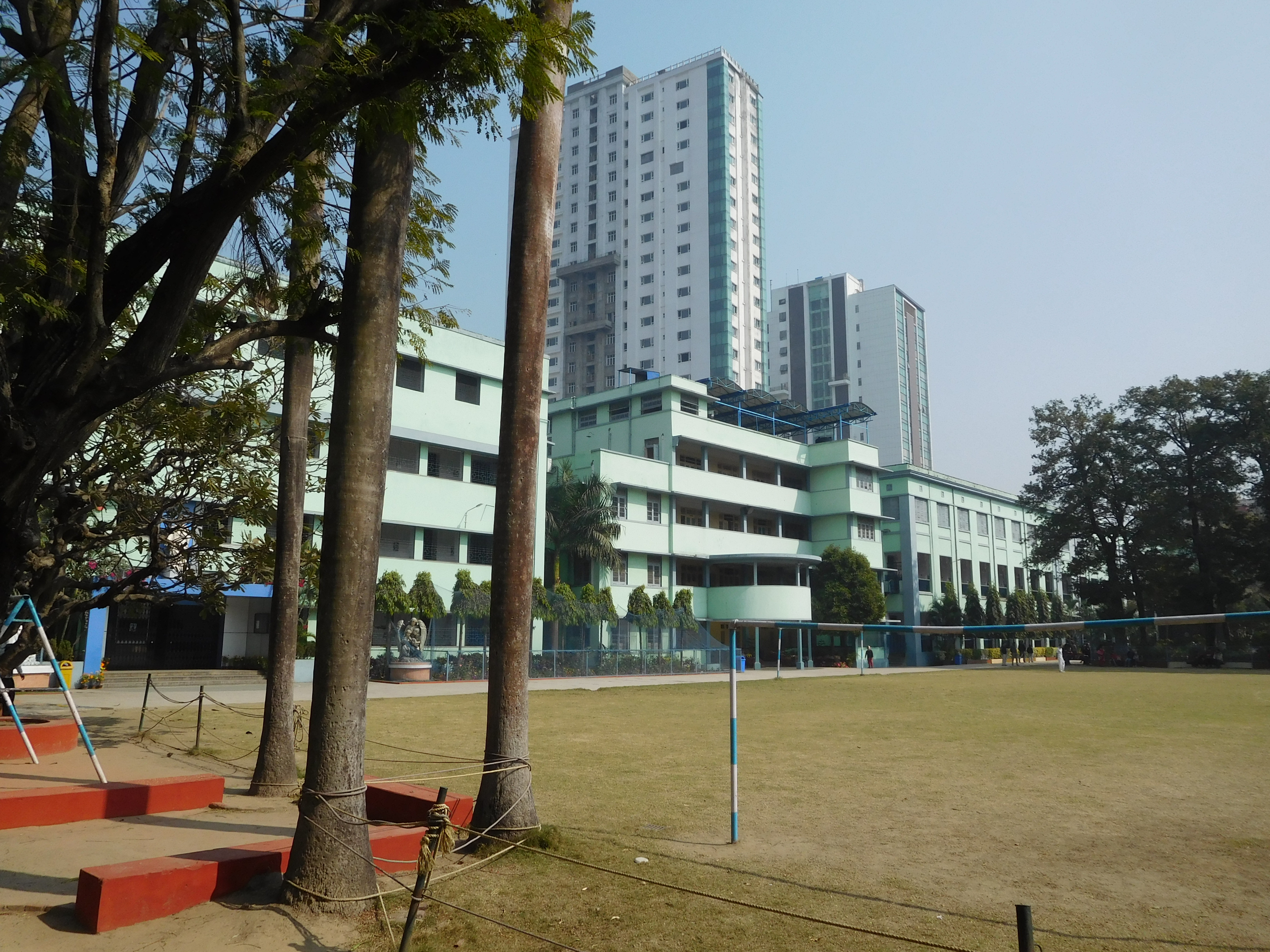
- St. Lawrence High School, Kolkata, in 2017

Location
- 27 Pramathesh Barua Sarani (formerly Ballygunge Circular Road); Kolkata-700019, West Bengal; India; 22°31′43.39″N 88°21′20.88″E

Information
- Former name: St. John Chrysostom School
- Type: Private primary and secondary school
- Motto: For God and Country
- Religious affiliation: Catholicism
- Denomination: Jesuits
- Patron saint: Lawrence of Rome
- Established: January 1937; 89 years ago
- Founder: Fr. Lawrence Rodrigues, S.J.
- School board: I.C.S.E. & I.S.C.
- School district: Kolkata
- Session: April–March
- Rector: Fr. Julian S. Das, S.J.
- Principal: Fr. M. Benny Thomas S.J.
- Teaching staff: 84
- Grades: 1-12
- Gender: Boys
- Enrollment: 1600+
- Average class size: 40
- Language: English
- Hours in school day: 5:50
- Campus: 7 acres (2.8 ha)
- Houses: Loyola; Xavier; Kalam (formerly Britto); Tagore (formerly Aloysius)
- Athletics: Football, cricket, basketball
- Nickname: Lawrencians; SLHS
- National ranking: 19
- Yearbook: The Lawrencian
- Affiliations: CISCE
- Website: stlawrencehighschool.edu.in

St. Lawrence High School is a private Catholic primary and secondary school for boys, located in Kolkata, West Bengal, India. The school was founded in 1810 and run by the Jesuits, initially in Baithakhana, Sealdah, as an elementary school which came to be known as St. John Chrysostom School. It was renamed in January 1937 by Fr. Lawrence Rodriques, S.J. as St. Lawrence High School. The school caters for approximately 1600 students.

== History ==
St.Lawrence High School traces its roots to an elementary school at the Church of Our Lady of Dolours at Baithakkhana, Sealdah, in 1810. In 1855 it was known as St. John Chrysostom's School and prepared students for the Lower Primary Examination. In 1902 it became the site of St. Ann’s Orphanage and included Upper Primary School; teaching was in Bengali but instruction in English was included. In 1913 teaching turned to English and boys were prepared for the Junior Cambridge Course. In 1920 the University of Calcutta recognised Chrysostom as a high school, with its first graduation in 1922. At that time the school at 126 Bow Bazar Street occupied one floor of a building that had a printery on the ground floor and the top floor housed boarders; it had no playground. In the 1930s Fr. Lawrence Rodriques S.J. held Sunday raffles to purchase St. Xavier's College land at Ballygunge. In January 1937 he was able to open a large new school there, featuring tall eucalyptus trees, a flower garden, and playground. Rodrigues rechristened the school after his namesake, Lawrence of Rome.

The school maintains as a goal to uplift the poor, to show equal respect for all castes, creeds, and social strata, and to promote unity in diversity. It would implement the Jesuit ideal of forming "persons for and with others."

== Programmes ==
St. Lawrence is an unaided, primary through higher secondary school for boys, with English as the medium of instruction. It has about 28 teachers and 22 classrooms at the secondary level, with computer-aided learning. Students are organised into four "houses" which integrate primary and high school students.

In 2017, St. Lawrence High celebrated in a big way the United Nations International Day of Sport for Development and Peace (6 April) and, along with its alumni association, sponsored an art contest for Jesuit schools worldwide on the theme of Olympic Games and Peace. In 2016 a group of students enjoyed a one-week, educational trip to China hosted by the Chinese Consul General His Excellency Mr. Ma Zhanwu.

Cricket, soccer, and basketball are the main school sports. The school has also had a championship rowing team. Extracurricular activities include speech and debate, drama, music, and choir. Dozens of videos of student activities are available on the web, as well as a tour of the facility.

== Notable alumni ==
- Aniruddha Bose, The Hon’ble Justice of the Supreme Court of India
- Ranadeb Bose, an Indian first class cricketer
- Suman Chakraborty, Director and Professor of Mechanical engineering at IIT Kharagpur
- Rahul Peter Das, emeritus professor of South Asian studies at the Martin Luther University Halle-Wittenberg, former president of the German Association for Asian Studies
- Utpal Dutt, an Indian actor, director, and writer-playwright.
- Abhik Ghosh, chemist and winner of the Hans Fischer Career Award (2022) for lifetime contributions
- Ashok Jhunjhunwala, an Indian academic, awarded Padma Shri, India, 2002: distinguished service in science and engineering, telecommunications
- Kamaleshwar Mukherjee, film director, theatre artist, doctor
- Kharaj Mukherjee, an Indian actor
- Bedabrata Pain, National Film Award-winning director and scientist
- Saugata Roy, an Indian politician and a member of parliament in the Lok Sabha of the Indian Parliament
- Tathagata Roy, an Indian politician, former Governor of Tripura (2015–2018), former Governor of Meghalaya (2018–2020)
- Soumen Sen, The Hon’ble Chief Justice of the Kerala High Court, Meghalaya High Court, Calcutta High Court
- Sidhu (musician), eminent musician, composer, lyricist, and member of Cactus (Indian band)
- Kabir Suman, an Indian Politician, music director, singer, composer, former journalist, and former Member of Lok Sabha of the Indian Parliament

== See also ==
- List of Jesuit schools
- List of schools in West Bengal
