= Subrata Dutta =

Indian actor

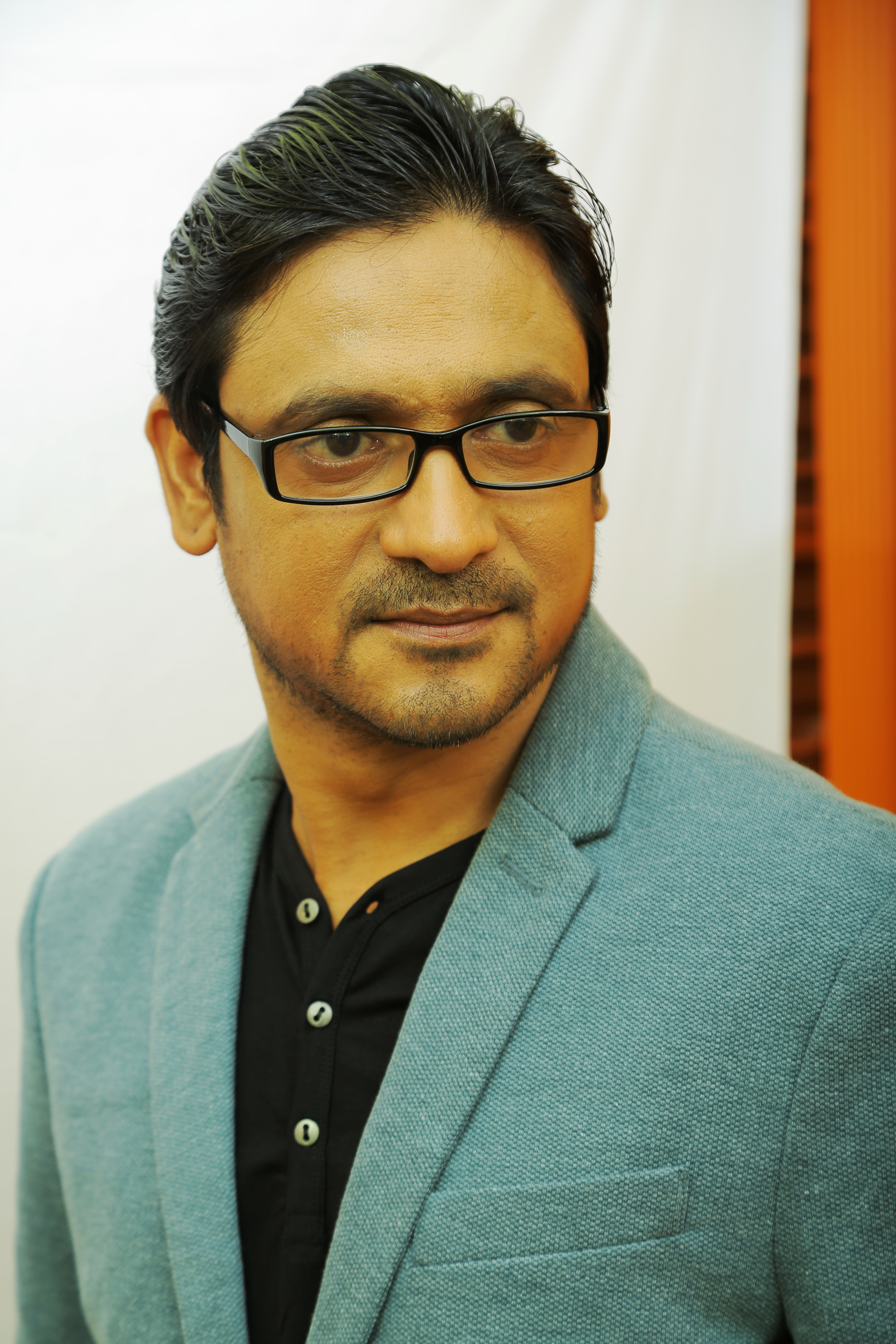
- Subrata Dutta in 2018
- Born: 16 November 1975 (age 50); Bankura, West Bengal
- Education: National School of Drama
- Occupation: Actor
- Spouse: Robijita Gogoii (m. 2006; div. 2018)
- Children: 1

Subrata Dutta (born 16 November 1975) is an Indian actor who predominantly works in Hindi and Bengali films. He is best known for his role in Bollywood films like Talaash, Tango Charlie, Zameen, The Shaukeens, Rakhcharitra, Bhootnath Returns and Bengali films Chaturanga, Bibar and Jor.

== Early life and education ==
Subrat Dutta was born in Bankura district of West Bengal. Eldest of three brothers, he completed his schooling from Bankura Christian Collegiate School and bachelor's degree from Bankura Sammilani College with major in Zoology.

Hailing from a non-filmy background Subrat Dutta had no planning to join films and he was preparing for his MBA, when suddenly an advertisement about a theatre workshop caught his attention. The 40 day long workshop organised by National School of Drama in Berhampore, West Bengal made him change his mind and he decided to join the school. After completing his master's degree from National School of Drama he received a scholarship from Charles Wallace Trust, New Delhi and joined Central School of Speech and Drama, London. Nawazuddin Siddiqui, Swanand Kirkire and Chittaranjan Tripathy were his National School of Drama batchmates.

He started his acting career as a theatre artist for NSD Repertory Company and played lead role in 35 plays before joining films.

Subrat Dutta has learnt dance from PranatI Sengupta and continued to take part in Tagore Dance Drama. He tried to learn Kathak but left after few months. He has also worked in amateur "Jatra".

== Career ==
He made silver screen debut with Hindi film Karvaan by Pankaj Butalia as the main protagonist in 1999. His first Bengali film was Uttara by Buddhadeb Dasgupta where he played a small role of a Hindu militant.

In the beginning of his career he has worked for many television series too. His work was noticed in Bengali teleseries Shudhu Tomari Jonyo. He has worked in few episodes of the series Tehreer…Munshi Premchand Ki by Gulzar, based on stories of Munsi Premchand. He was also featured in few episodes of the thriller series Kagaar on Sahara One. Later he returned to television once with Yash Raj Films series Powder in 2010. After making his debut in both Bollywood and the Bengali film industry, he went on to work in both the industries together. Hindi films like 88 Antop Hill (2003), Zameen (2003) and Bengali film Swapner Feriwala (2002) were some of his early works.

Subrat Dutta earned critical acclaim for his portrayal of a common man in Subrata Sen directorial Bibar (2026), which has been adapted from an aponymous novel by Samaresh Basu. He won Best Actor at the Osian's Cinefan Festival of Asian and Arab Cinema. He played the principal antagonist in Swapan Saha's Jor. He also acted in Suman Mukhopadhyay's period drama Chaturanga, which was based on Rabindranath Tagore's novel.

In 2009 he was awarded Best Actor at Cairo International Film Festival, Egypt for his portrayal of the main protagonist Madholal in the film Madholal Keep Walking by Jai Tank. The film received positive reviews from critics and Subrat Dutta’s character was highly praised that gave him lead roles in many commercial and independent films in later years.

His next venture was Ram Gopal Varma’s magnum opus, Rakta Charitra (Part I and II) in 2010, where he played the character of AK. In the same year he appeared in Bengali films Achin Pakhi and Antim Shash Sundar. He next worked in Talaash (2012), Koyekti Meyer Golpo (2012), and some independent Hindi films including Oass (2012), Kaphal (2012) and Baromas (2013). In Bhoothnath Returns (2014), he played an engineer ghost.

He next appeared as the main villain Bheera in Roar: Tigers of the Sundarbans (2014) based on tiger poaching in Sundarbans and film director Basu in Akshay Kumar starrer Bollywood film TheShaukeens (2014). In both the films his role received critical acclaim. He also appeared in films like Bumper Draw (2015), Charlie Kay Chakkar Mein (2015) and played lead role as ATS Chief in Sameer (2017) and Gandhian Divakar in Humne Gandhi Ko Mar Diya (2018). His next release was multilimgual III Smoking Barrels where he played the character of a Bangladeshi refugee earned him immense applause from pan Indian audience and critics. His character Mukhtar turns the victim of illegal Elephant poaching where his every move and actions got praised by the critics.

Subrat Dutta was part of Bengali popular series Byomkesh also. He played a noticeable role in Har Har Byomkesh in 2015. Later he played Ajit for Byomkesh series of popular Bengali online channel Hoichoi. He has played the lead character in the emotional drama Bhairavi which was released exclusively on Muvizz.com in 2016. Apart from Bollywood and Bengali films he has also appeared in Marathi film Lalbaugchi Rani (2016), Bhojpuri films Tujhse Laagi Lagan, Pistol Ego Prem Kahani and American production English language film Behind the Trees.

Subrat Dutta has acted in more than 45 films. Most of his films like Uttara, Kaphal: The Wild Berries, Chaturanga, Bibar, Madholal Keep Walking were shown in prestigious National & International Festivals & also won couple of prestigious National and International awards. He has often been referred 'chameleon' as he changed his appearance for every film and experimented with his look for each character he played.

Aasma by Sudipto Sen, T for Tajmahal by Kireet Khurana, Bengali film Sitara opposite Raima Sen and Brishti tomake Dilam opposite Jaya Ahsan are some of his upcoming films.

Subrat Dutta appears in TV and web commercials regularly. Some of his notable commercials are Parle G, Wonder cement, Aircel IPL Commercial, OLX. and Google Paise.

== Personal life ==
Subrat Dutta is a Yoga expert and practitioner. He was married to theatre director Robijita Gogoii from 2006 to 2018 whom he met in National School of Drama. After a long period of courtship, they got married on 29 August 2006. Together they have a daughter named Aatreyi born on 8 June 2010.

== Filmography ==
| Year | Title | Language | Role | Director |
|---|---|---|---|---|
| 1999 | Karwaan | Hindi | Gautam | |
| 2000 | Uttara | Bengali | As Hindu militant | |
| 2001 | Lajja | Hindi | Cameo | |
| 2002 | Swapner Feriwala | Bengali | Shome | Subrata Sen |
| 2002 | Dharini | Hindi | | |
| 2003 | 88 Antop Hill | Hindi | Prashant | |
| 2003 | Sala Bandar! | Hindi Short film | Gulshan | Roop Singh Sood< |
| 2003 | Zameen | Hindi | Major Puri | |
| 2005 | Tango Charlie | Hindi | As revolutionary leader | |
| 2005 | Mangal Pandey: The Rising | Hindi | Mangal's friend | |
| | Light House (Sudhu Tomari Jonno) | Bengali | | Debangshu Sengupta |
| 2006 | Bibar | Bengali | Biresh | Subrata Sen |
| 2008 | Jor | Bengali | Indrajit | |
| 2008 | Shaurya | Hindi | Colonel Malhotra | Samar Khan |
| 2008 | Tomar Jonyo | Bengali | Rahul Roy | Nilanjan Banerjee |
| 2008 | Chaturanga | Bengali | Sachish | |
| 2008 | 10:10 | Bengali | Apratim | Arin Paul |
| 2009 | Thanks Maa | Hindi | | Irfan Kamal |
| 2009 | Madholal Keep Walking | Hindi | Madholal Dubey | Jai Tank |
| 2010 | Achin Pakhi | Bengali | Achin | |
| 2010 | Antim Swash Sundar | Bengali | Prem Sengupta | Kris Alin |
| 2010 | Rakhta Charitra I | Hindi/Telugu | AK | |
| 2010 | Rakhta Charitra II | Hindi/Telugu | AK | |
| 2012 | Koyekti Meyer Golpo | Bengali | Ashesh | [ |
| 2012 | Oass | Hindi | Jhukki | Abhinav Shiv Tiwari |
| 2012 | Taalash | Hindi | Shashi Nayak | |
| 2012 | Lattoo | Bengali | Aarjo | Ashish Roy |
| 2013 | Meridian Lines | Hindi | Romeo | Venod Mitra |
| 2013 | Kaphal: Wild Berries | Hindi | Kailash | Batul Mukhtiar |
| 2013 | Baromas | Hindi | Eknath Tanpure | Dhiraj Meshram |
| 2013 | Target Kolkata | Bengali | Surjo | Kartick Singh |
| 2014 | Bhootnath Returns | Hindi | Engineer Ghost | Nitesh Tiwari |
| 2014 | ROAR: Tigers of the Sundarbans | Hindi | Bheera | Kamal Sadnah |
| 2014 | The Shaukeens | Hindi | Ranjit Basu | Abhishek Sharma |
| 2015 | Tevar | Hindi | Kaakdi | Amit Ravindernath Sharma |
| 2015 | Pakaram | Bengali | Dipak | Shankar Debnath |
| 2015 | Bumper Draw | Hindi | Villium | Irshad Khan |
| 2015 | Charlie Kay Chakkar Mein | Hindi | Sohail | Manish Srivastav |
| 2015 | Har Har Byomkesh | Bengali | Narmadashankar | Arindam Sil |
| 2016 | Ardhangini Ek Ardhsatya | Bengali | Sandeep | Reema Mukherjee |
| 2016 | Lalbaugchi Rani | Marathi | Drunk guy | Laxman Utekar |
| 2016 | Bhairavi | Hindi | | Suhail Tatari |
| 2017 | Sameer | Hindi | Desai, ATS Chief | Dakxin Bajrange |
| 2018 | Humne Gandhi Ko Mar Diya | Hindi | Divakar | Naeem A Siddiqui |
| 2018 | W | Hindi Short Film | —N/a | Sushant Panda |
| 2018 | III Smoking Barrels | Multilingual | Mukhtar | Sanjib Dey |
| 2018 | T for Tajmahal | Hindi | Bansi | Kireet Khurana |
| 2019 | Dotara | Bengali | Debdutta | Amitabha Dasgupta |
| 2019 | Sitara | Bengali | Manab Sarkar | Ashish Roy |
| 2019 | Brishti Tomake Dilam | Bengali | | Arnab Paul |
| 2019 | Dhuusar | Bengali | Prashanta Guha | Snehashish Mondal, Soumi Saha |
| 2019 | Junction Varanasi | Hindi | Sadhu's Associate | Dheeraj Pandit |
| 2019 | Josef – Born in Grace | Hindi | Josef | Susant Mishra |
| 2019 | Behind the Trees | English | Navin | Vikram Jayakumar |
| 2019 | Dhumkkudiya | Hindi | Kamal | Nandlal Nayak |
| 2020 | Uraan | Bengali | Arif Alam | Tridib Raman |
| 2020 | Harami | Hindi | Dhiren Yvas | Shyam Madiraju |
| 2020 | Banaras Vanilla | Hindi | | Sumit Mishra |
| 2020 | Lucknow Times | Hindi | Kallol Ghosh | Sudipto Sen |
| 2023 | Guthlee Ladoo | Hindi | Mangru, Guthlee's father | Ishrat R Khan |
| 2023 | Flowers of the Mountain | Hindi | Parijat Mukherjee | Shuvro Roy |
| 2024 | Bastar: The Naxal Story | Hindi | | Sudipto Sen |
| 2025 | Bhaggyolokkhi | Bengali | A police officer | Mainak Bhaumik |
| 2025 | Aasma | Hindi | Intekhab | Sudipto Sen |
| 2026 | Bibi Payra | Bengali | Jhuma's husband | Arjunn Dutta |
| 2026 | Phera | Bengali | Ananda, Palash's colleague | Pritha Chakraborty |

== Television ==
| Year | Title | Episodes/Character | Channel |
|---|---|---|---|
| 2002-2003 | Shudhu Tomari Jonyo | Shankar Dada Onyo Rong | Etv Bangla |
| 2002-2003 | Tehreer…Munsi Premchand Ki | Namak Ka Daroga Sawa Sher Gehu | DD National |
| 2002 | Kagaar | Operation Rameswaram | Sahara One |
| 2010 | Powder | As Zonal Inspector Bose | Sony Entertainment Television |

== Web series ==
| Year | Web series | Character | OTT platform | Notes | Ref. |
|---|---|---|---|---|---|
| 2018 | Selection Day | Broker | Netflix | | |
| 2017-2018 | Byomkesh | Ajit Kumar Banerjee | Hoichoi | | |
| 2019 | Montu Pilot | | Hoichoi | | |
| 2020 | Lalbazaar | A.C Port Gaurav Dutta | ZEE5 | | |
| 2020 | Shobdo Jobdo | Dr. Amitabha Mitra | Hoichoi | | |
| 2020 | High | Dr. Roy | MX Player | | |
| 2022 | Feludar Goyendagiri | Mahadev Verma | Hoichoi | | |
| 2023 | Honeymoon | Shekhar | Klikk | | |
| 2024 | Kaantaye Kaantaye | Raman Guha | ZEE5 | | |

== Awards ==
- Best Actor: Cairo International Film Festival, Egypt, 2009
- Best Actor: at Osian's-Cinefan, New Delhi, 2006
- Best Actor: Dehradun International Film Festival, 2021 (Josef – Born in Grace)
- Best Actor: Manikarnika International Film Festival, 2022 (Josef – Born in Grace)
