= Tomay Amay Mile =

2013 Bengali television series

- Genre: Family drama Romance
- Created by: Shashi Sumeet Mittal; Sumeet Hukamchand Mittal
- Screenplay by: Nilanjana Sharma; Mon Chakraborty; Dialogue; Amitabha Bhattacharya
- Story by: Shashi Mittal; Ananda Bardhan Sharma
- Directed by: Prabir Ganguly
- Creative directors: Nilanjana Sharma; Jisshu Sengupta
- Starring: See below
- Opening theme: "Tomay Amay Mile"
- Composers: Arijit Singh, Ujjaini Mukherjee
- Country of origin: India
- Original language: Bengali
- No. of seasons: 1
- No. of episodes: 992

Production
- Executive producers: Anindya; Ishani (Star Jalsha)
- Producers: Nilanjana Sharma; Jisshu Sengupta
- Production locations: Kolkata; Pattaya
- Cinematography: Tuban; Pratip Mukherjee
- Editor: Krishnendu Ghosh
- Running time: 22 minutes
- Production company: Blue Water Pictures

Original release
- Network: Star Jalsha
- Release: 11 March 2013 – 20 March 2016

Related
- Diya Aur Baati Hum

Tomay Amay Mile was a Bengali television drama on Star Jalsha. It ran from 11 March 2013 to 21 March 2016 and stars Riju Biswas and Roosha Chatterjee. The show is an official remake of Star Plus's show Diya Aur Baati Hum.

== Plot ==
The story centers upon a college student, Ushoshi Mitra, whose dream is to become an IPS officer, and Nishith Ghosh a sweetshop owner and sweetmaker.

Nishith and Ushoshi get married under strained circumstances. Ushoshi struggles with her strict mother-in-law who does not accept that her daughter-in-law could become a police officer. The story shows how Ushoshi's husband becomes her strength and helps her to fulfil her dreams.

== Cast ==
- Roosha Chatterjee as Ushoshi Ghosh (née Mitra) — an IPS officer, Nishith's wife, Sujan and Chitra's daughter, Bitan’s younger sister
  - Ditipriya Roy as childhood Ushoshi
- Riju Biswas / Gourab Roy Chowdhury as Nishith Ghosh — a sweet seller Ushoshi's husband, Bhavani and Gobindo's adopted son/Bhavani's biological nephew, Taroni's biological son
- Tulika Basu as Bhavani Ghosh, Gobindo's wife, Shyamal, Debol and Soma's mother, Nishith's adopted mother/biological aunt
- Titas Bhowmik as Kakoli Ghosh, wife of Shyamal Ghosh, mother of Rani
- Prantik Banerjee as Shyamal Ghosh, husband of Kakoli Ghosh, father of Rani Ghosh, son of Bhavani and Gobindo Ghosh
- Biplab Banerjee as Gobindo Ghosh, Bhavani's husband, Shyamal, Debol and Soma's father, Nishith's adopted father, Raja and Rani's paternal grandfather
- Priyanka Raychowdhury as Shundari, Ghosh house servant, Bakelal's love interest
- Chhanda Chatterjee as Katyayani Ghosh, Gobindo Ghosh's aunt, Shyamal, Debol and Soma's grand-aunt, Nishith's adopted great-aunt, Raja & Rani's great-grand-aunt, Kumud's grandmother
- Indrajit Deb as Kakoli & Keka's father, Rani's maternal grandfather
- Sharmila Das as Phul Bou, the Ghosh family's neighbour
- Priya Mondal as Diana Ghosh, wife of Debol Ghosh, Raja's mother, Naresh's girlfriend
- Debraj Mukherjee as Naresh Kumar, Abha Sundari's son, Palash's brother, Soma's ex-husband, Diana's boyfriend
- Dolon Roy as Abha Sundari, Naresh and Palash's mother, Soma's ex mother-in-law
- Prince Ghosh as Debal Ghosh, Diana's husband, Raja's father
- Tanuka Chatterjee as Taroni Debi, Nishith's biological mother, Bhavani's younger sister, Gobindo’s sister-in-law, Shyamol, Debol & Soma’s aunt (deceased)
- Sutirtha Saha as Surya Mitra, Ushoshi's colleague
- Mallika Majumdar as Madhura Sen, Surya and Ushoshi's boss, Rik's mother
- Debdut Ghosh as Sujan Mitra, Bitan & Ushoshi's father (deceased)
- Chaiti Ghoshal as Chitra Mitra, Bitan & Ushoshi's mother (deceased)
- Aditya Roy as Palash, Soma's former crush & ex brother-in-law, Abha Sundari's son, Naresh's younger brother (deceased)
- Manoj Ojha as Aslam Chowdhury, Nishith's friend
- Deerghoi Paul as Sohini, Ushoshi's best friend
- Tirtha Mallick as Siddhartha, Soma's ex-fiancé, Keka's boyfriend
- Sukdeep Ghosh as Murolidhar Das / Muroli / Arindam Sanyal, Nita's Husband (deceased)
- Debjani Deb / Sananda Basak / Ayesha Bhattacharya / Anaya Kheya Ghosh as Soma Ghosh
- Runa Bandopadhyay as Ushoshi's Principal
- Upanita Banerjee as Elli, Diana's older sister, Debol's sister-in-law, Raja's maternal aunt
- Meghna Mukherjee as Kabita, Nishith's ex-fiancé, Kunjo's ex-girlfriend
- Arnab Banerjee as Bitan Mitra, Ushoshi's brother, Pritha's husband, son of Chitra & Sujan Mitra, Raziya's father
  - Sohel Dutta as childhood Bitan
- Sohom Basu Roy Chowdhury as Chotu

== Adaptations ==
Language	Title	Original release	Network(s)	Last aired	Notes
Hindi	Diya Aur Baati Hum दिया और बाती हम	29 August 2011	StarPlus	10 September 2016	Original
Bengali	Tomay Amay Mile তোমায় আমায় মিলে	11 March 2013	Star Jalsha	20 March 2016	Remake
Malayalam	Parasparam പരസ്പരം	22 July 2013	Asianet	31 August 2018	Remake
Marathi	Phulala Sugandha Maticha फुलाला सुगंध मातीचा	2 September 2020	Star Pravah	4 December 2022	Remake
Tamil	Raja Rani 2 ராஜா ராணி 2	12 October 2020	Star Vijay	21 March 2023	Remake
Telugu	Janaki Kalaganaledu జానకి కలగలేదు	22 March 2021	Star Maa	19 August 2023	Remake
