= Hotath Neerar Jonnyo =

- DVD cover of the film
- Directed by: Subrata Sen
- Written by: Sunil Gangopadhyay (story), Subrata Sen (screenplay)
- Produced by: Kanchan Datta; Sugata Guha
- Starring: Bikram Ghosh; Jaya Seal; Arindam Sil
- Cinematography: Samiran Datta
- Edited by: Rabi Ranjan Moitra
- Music by: Bikram Ghosh
- Release date: 2004
- Running time: 113 minutes
- Country: India
- Language: Bengali

Hotath Neerar Jonnyo is a 2004 Bengali film directed by director Subrata Sen. It is based on a short story Rani O Abinash by noted novelist Sunil Gangopadhyay.

== Plot ==
Rani (Ghosh) is a housewife with a successful husband, Tapas, and a kid. Living a routine existence, Rani looks after her family and attends her dance classes. One day her old friend from college Abinash (Ghosh) comes into her life. Abinash is a renowned musician currently and has been travelling around the world. Abinash says to Rani that he has had relationships with a few women, but cannot offer himself up fully because the memory of Rani stands in his way. He asks her to spend a day with him so that he can get over her. Abinash also has a girlfriend Tina who is in love with him. Rani, torn between principles and passion, succumbs to Abinash's persistence. This creates havoc in her personal life while Abinash, his goal complete, moves away from her.

== Cast ==
- Bikram Ghosh
- Jaya Ghosh
- Arindam Sil
- Tina Majumdar
- Saptarshi Dasgupta
