= Honeymoon (2023 TV series) =

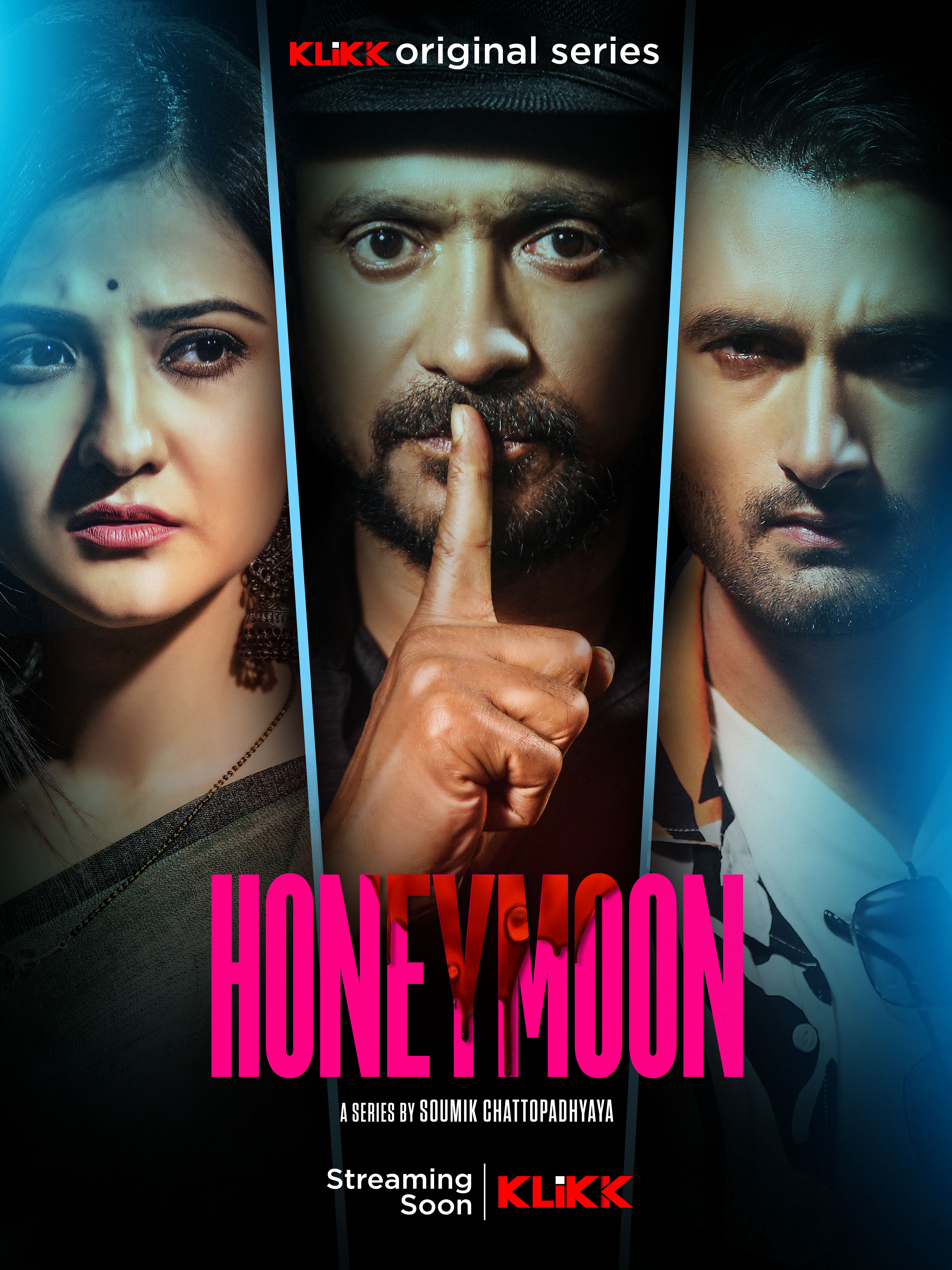
- Genre: crime and thriller
- Written by: Soumik Chattopadhyay and Soumit Deb
- Directed by: Soumik Chattopadhyay
- Starring: Aishwarya Sen, Subrat Dutta, Sean Banerjee
- Country of origin: India
- Original language: Bengali
- No. of seasons: 1
- No. of episodes: 6

Production
- Producer: Santanu Chatterjee
- Cinematography: Madhusudan Shi, Akash Sethi
- Editor: Koustav Sarkar

Original release
- Network: Klikk
- Release: 19 May 2023

Honeymoon is a 2023 Bengali language thriller and crime streaming television series written and directed by Soumik Chattopadhyay. The series is produced by Santanu Chatterjee.

The series starring Aishwarya Sen, Subrat Dutta and Sean Banerjee are in the lead roles. The series was released on 19 May 2023.

== Cast ==
- Aishwarya Sen as Ranjini
- Subrat Dutta as Shekhar
- Sean Banerjee as Ishan

== Plot ==
Ishan Chatterjee and Ranjini Chatterjee have been married for six months. Despite the fact that their marriage was arranged, their love is strong. However, there are many unsaid, suppressed facts and hidden things underneath all of their happiness and contentment. After six months on the honeymoon, Ishan and Ranjini's secrets began to be uncovered one by one. A third character enters the story.

== Episodes ==
No.	Title	Directed by	Original release date
1	"Are You Stalking Me?"	Soumik Chattopadhyay	19 May 2023
For the past six months, Ranjini and Ishan have been happily married. She has, however, been keeping a secret from her spouse. Unbeknownst to Ishan, their honeymoon turns into a crucial meeting when they meet a mystery stranger.
2	"We Need To Talk!"	Soumik Chattopadhyay	19 May 2023
Their honeymoon is marred by a series of strange occurrences. However, during a deeply weird encounter with Shekhar, everything changes for the marriage, and she suddenly realises that her perception of her husband may not match his identity.
3	"The Thin Line Of Trust!"	Soumik Chattopadhyay	19 May 2023
Both are in despair after discovering evidence of her infidelity. Uncovering Shekhar's manipulative grip over their lives gradually, they realise that only the truth can bring them freedom. But the border between truth and falsehood is razor thin.
4	"The Escape"	Soumik Chattopadhyay	19 May 2023
Despite Shekhar's crafty plan to make them suffer, Ishaan and Ranjini devise a daring escape strategy. They obtain assistance from an unknown person who assists them in hiding from him. Their woes, however, are far from ended.
5	"Only The Truth Can Set Her Free!"	Soumik Chattopadhyay	19 May 2023
Ishan saves her after she is kidnapped, but he falls into Shekhar's trap. Ishaan, who is already the most wanted man in the state, must now hide himself and figure out what Shekhar's plans are. What he discovers totally changes his life.
6	"The Devil Is In The Details"	Soumik Chattopadhyay	19 May 2023
When Ishan realises the wrongs he has done in the past, he feels compelled to make a sacrifice in order to make things right and regain his sanity. He must give up something extremely important to him.
