= June Malia =

Indian actress and politician

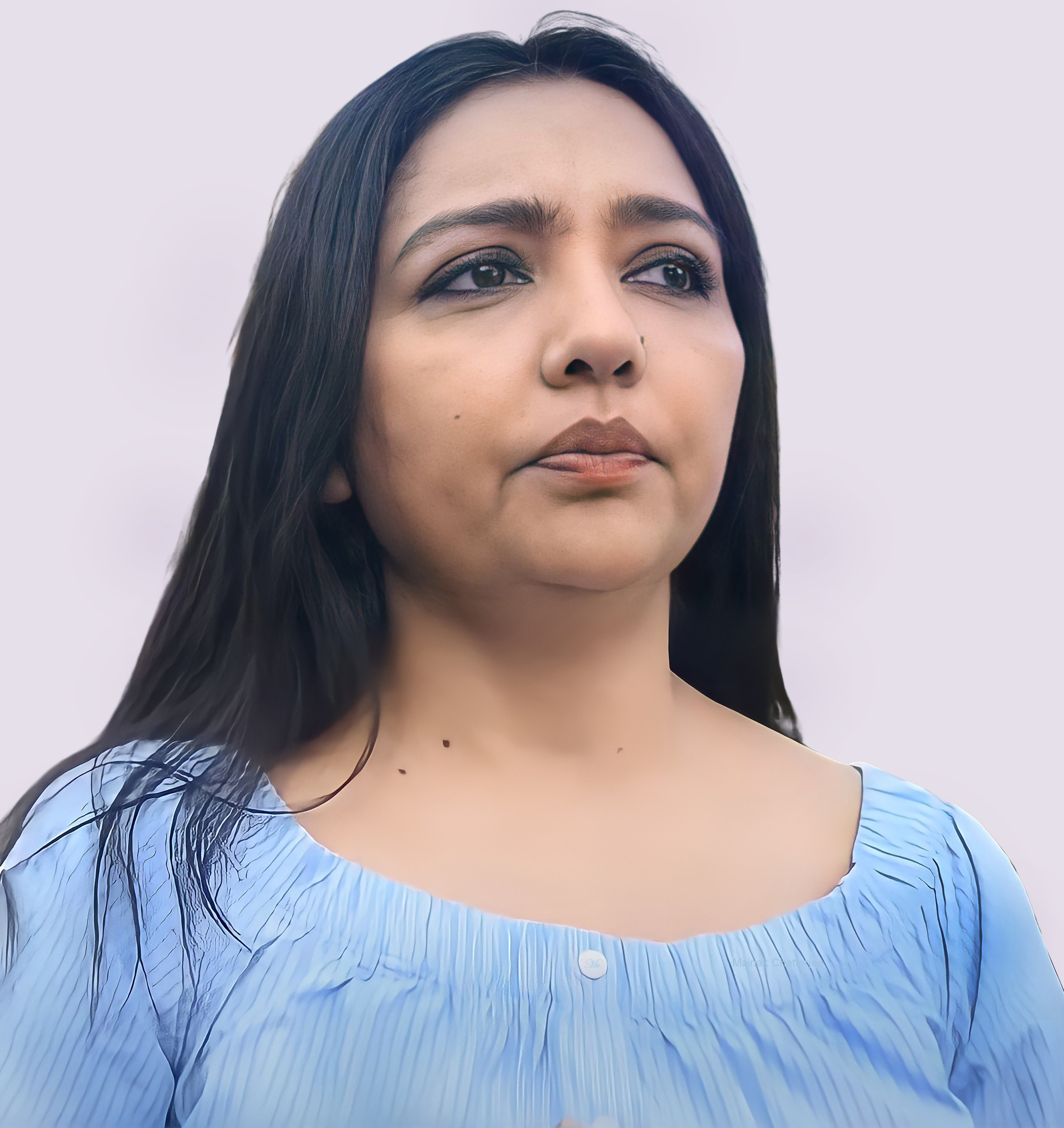
- June Malia

Member of Parliament, Lok Sabha
- Incumbent
- Assumed office 4 June 2024
- Preceded by: Dilip Ghosh
- Constituency: Medinipur

Member of West Bengal Legislative Assembly
- In office 2 May 2021 – 4 June 2024
- Preceded by: Mrigendra Nath Maiti
- Succeeded by: Sujoy Hazra
- Constituency: Medinipur

Personal details
- Party: Nationalist Citizens Party of India (2026–present)
- Other political affiliations: Trinamool Congress (till 2026)
- Occupation: Actress; Politician
- Born: June Dobe; 24 June 1970 (age 56); Calcutta, West Bengal, India
- Years active: 1996–present
- Spouse: Sourav Chattopadhyay
- Relatives: Shivangini Malia (daughter)

June Malia (Note: Spelling according to The Times of India) (or June Maliah) (born June Dobe; 24 June 1970) is an Indian actress and politician who predominantly works in Bengali cinema and television. She is a philanthropist and also a member of West Bengal Women's Commission.

== Early life ==
Maliah was born in Calcutta to Arun Prasad Dobe and Parul Dobe. She studied at Modern High School.

== Political career ==
In 2021, she was elected as Member of West Bengal Legislative Assembly from Medinipur constituency. In 2024, she was elected from Midnapur Loksabha, representing Trinamool Congress for Lok Sabha election.

== Political career ==
She contested the 2024 Lok Sabha election from the Trinamool Congress from Jhargram Lok Sabha constituency and won to became first time Member of Parliament.

=== 2026 Rebellion ===
In June 2026, almost immediately after the massive Trinamool Congress defeat, around 20 MPs of TMC allegedly declared rebellion from their Party, and presented their written wish to join Bhartiya Janata Party. This group was led by Kakoli Ghosh.

Later, on 14 June, 20 MPs, including Malia, signed a formal letter declaring their split from Trinamool Congress as to merge with the Nationalist Citizen Party of India (NCPI). They formally submitted the letter to Lok Sabha Speaker Om Birla.

The total strength of TMC in Lok Sabha had been 28, so that a number of 20 MPS made it eligible for splitting from the Party, as per the Indian Defection laws, so as to escape the anti-defection disqualification.

== Filmography ==
| Year | Title | Role | Notes |
|---|---|---|---|
| 1996 | Lathi | | |
| 1998 | Hothat Brishti | Rupamati | |
| 2002 | Bor Kone | | |
| 2003 | Nil Nirjane | Jaya | |
| 2003 | Aamar Mayer Shapath | | |
| 2006 | The Bong Connection | | |
| 2006 | Shikar | Reshmi | |
| 2007 | Podokkhep | Seema | |
| 2008 | Lovesongs | | |
| 2008 | Raktamukhi Neela - A Murder Mystery | | |
| 2011 | Shey Sraban | Probir's Wife | |
| 2012 | Prem Bibhrat | Nabanita | |
| 2012 | Hathat Vishon Valo Lagchhe | | |
| 2012 | Sabdhan Pancha Aaschhe | | |
| 2012 | Teen Yaari Katha | Sreeradha | |
| 2015 | Ebar Shabor | Doyel Ghosh | |
| 2015 | Har Har Byomkesh | Miss Manna | special appearance |
| 2015 | Ekla Chalo | | |
| 2015 | Sesh Anka | | |
| 2016 | Zulfiqar | Pariza Khan | Based on Porcia |
| 2016 | Romantic Noy | Shilpi | |
| 2017 | Meri Pyaari Bindu | Bindu's mother | |
| 2017 | Porobashinee | Actress | |
| 2019 | Sweater | Mother in law of Tuku | |
| 2019 | Mitin Mashi | Lila Jariwala | |
| 2022 | Kishmish | Rohini's mother | |
| 2022 | Khela Jokhon | | |
| 2025 | O Mon Bhromon | | Not release |

=== Documentary ===
- Out in India: A Family's Journey (2008)

== Web Series/ Short Films ==
- Virgin Mohito (2018) (Addatimes)
- Karkat Rogue (2020) (ZEE5)
- Srikanto (2022) (Hoichoi)
- Abar Proloy (2023) (ZEE5) as Indrani
- Choddobeshi (2026) (Hoichoi) as Mandakini Chowdhury

== Television ==
- Didi No. 1 (reality game show)
- Dhyatterika
- Shirinra (Telefilm)
- Babushona (Comedy show)
- Dance Bangla Dance (Dance reality show)
- Kacher Manush
- Behula
- Resham Jhapi
- Sob Choritro Kalponik
- Sanjher Bati
- Gantchhora
- Love Biye Aaj Kal
