= Bibar =

- Poster for the film Bibar
- Directed by: Subrata Sen
- Written by: Subrata Sen
- Produced by: R D Bansal
- Starring: Subrat Dutta; Tannishtha Chatterjee; Payel Sarkar; Sabyasachi Chakrabarty
- Cinematography: Shirsha Roy
- Edited by: Raviranjan Maitra
- Music by: Debojyoti Mishra
- Release date: 6 June 2006
- Running time: 113 minutes
- Country: India
- Language: Bengali

Bibar (Bengali: বিবর pronounced Bengali pronunciation: [ˈbibar]) is a 2006 Indian Bengali drama film directed by Subrata Sen starring Subrat Dutta, Tannishtha Chatterjee, Payel Sarkar, Sabyasachi Chakrabarty, Kunal Mitra, Shiladitya Patranabis, Pradip Mukherjee, Anuradha Ray, Kanchan Mullick, Rajesh Sharma, Dulal Lahiri and Biswajit Chakraborty. Based on Samaresh Basu's 1965 controversial novel Calcutta, Unabashed, Bibar deals with the angst of city youth in Calcutta, who are caught between the lures of a new, liberalized society and fast-fading traditional values.

== Plot ==
Biresh Bose works in a finance company IIDB as an investigating officer who prepares the investigation reports on which the loans are sanctioned. The company has provided him a pick up and drop car and he gets a handsome salary. At heart, he is a bohemian with no rigid values in life. He is a regular drinker. He visits the bar every evening. One such evening at the bar he meets Nita, a high-society call girl Nita, with whom he is caught in a psycho-sexual relationship. After that Biresh starts visiting Nita's apartment regularly and gradually he started feeling peculiar attraction for Nita. Biresh has a friend name Hiren, who is a painter. He lives in with his model Iti. One evening Hiren takes Biresh to Sonagachi brothel, the infamous red-light area of Calcutta. There Biresh learns that Hiren was a regular visitor of that area. He is attracted towards Iti.

In his office, his position becomes bleak as he refuses a loan to an influential person, Haralal Bhattacharya, an NRI who applied for loan in Biresh's company. Biresh while investigating found that Haralal's claim was false. So in his report, he stated that Haralal is not eligible for any loan. That ultimately creates problems in Biresh's life. Being an NRI, Haralal had an enormous connection in the upper level. So Biresh was asked by his superiors to change his investigation report, so that Haralal could get the loan. One day Iti visits Biresh's office and tells him that Hiren has left her. She needs Biresh's help. Biresh learns that Haralal was a regular visitor to Nita's place those days. Biresh finds Haralal in disturbing not only his office life but also his personal life. Biresh, in a bout of self-destruction, vents his anger and frustration by strangling Nita and stages his alibi through Iti. The police investigate but are unable to establish any motive behind the killing. Police investigator suspects him but cannot not prove him guilty. Iti tells the police that when Nita was killed Biresh was in her apartment the whole night. Everybody starts believing that Haralal might killed Nita. Biresh's company decided that not to give loan to Haralal. Life become smooth for Biresh again, but Nita still haunts him. So one day he calls the police and confesses to the murder of Nita.

== Cast ==
- Subrat Dutta as Biresh Bose
- Tannishtha Chatterjee as Nita Roy
- Payel Sarkar as Iti, Hiren's girl-friend
- Sabyasachi Chakraborty as police investigation officer
- Kunal Mitra as Haralal Bhattacharya, NRI businessman
- Shiladitya Patronobish as Hiren, artist and Biren's friend
- Pradip Mukherjee as Biresh's father
- Anuradha Ray as Biresh's mother
- Kanchan Mullick in a special appearance
- Rajesh Sharma in a special appearance
- Dulal Lahiri as Mr Bagchi, Biresh's boss
- Biswajit Chakraborty as Mr Chattopadhyay, Biresh's senior colleague
- Oindrila Khan as Bidisha, Biresh's sister

== Promotion ==
After looking around for the main cast (Raima Sen and Nandana Deb Sen were considered for the leads), Subrata Sen formed a star cast with Payel Sarkar, Subrat Dutta (Rising) and Tannistha Chatterjee. Subrata Sen said, "I saw Payel's photo and interview in Calcutta Times and decided to cast her. Tannistha has worked German director Florian Gallenberger and I have worked with Subrat Dutta before in 'Swapner Ferriwallah' and know his potential well. Bibar might be a difficult novel to translate onto screen but Sen has worked hard on the script."

Tannistha Chatterjee was recommended for Bibar by Nandana Deb Sen. "I am playing an upper class call girl who is straight forward and knows how she can get what she wants," says the actress, shooting in a Ballygunge house.

"This has been my most difficult film. Even veteran directors haven't had the courage to adopt Bibar. Hope people like my treatment." — Subrata Sen, The Times of India, 13 December 2006

== Awards ==
- BFJA Awards (2007)
  - Most Promising Actress Tannistha Chatterjee
- Best Actor:
  - Best Actress: Tannistha Chatterjee
  - Best Actor: Subrat Dutt
