= Santosh Rana (CPI) =

Indian politician

MLA
- In office 2006–2011
- Constituency: Medinipur

Personal details
- Born: 1 February 1948 (age 78)
- Party: Communist Party of India

Santosh Rana (born 1948) is an Indian politician, belonging to the Communist Party of India. He studied at Bhattar College at Danton, graduating with a B.A. in 1969.

He contested the Tamluk seat in the 2001 West Bengal legislative assembly election, and finished in second place with 44.45% of the votes.

He won the Medinipur seat in the 2006 West Bengal legislative assembly election, but lost it in 2011.
