= Sujoy Hazra =

Indian politician

Member of the West Bengal Legislative Assembly
- In office 23 November 2024 – 4 May 2026
- Preceded by: June Maliah
- Succeeded by: Shankar Guchhait
- Constituency: Medinipur

Personal details
- Party: All India Trinamool Congress
- Profession: Politician

Sujoy Hazra is an Indian politician from West Bengal. He is a member of the West Bengal Legislative Assembly since 2024, representing Medinipur Assembly constituency as a Member of the All India Trinamool Congress.

== See also ==
- List of chief ministers of West Bengal
- West Bengal Legislative Assembly
