= Rahul Peter Das =

German professor of South Asian studies (born 1954)

Rahul Peter Das (born 7 July 1954 in Haan, North Rhine-Westphalia), an alumnus of St. Lawrence High School, Kolkata, is a former professor of South Asian studies (Südasienkunde) at the Martin Luther University of Halle-Wittenberg, where he was also dean of studies of the Faculty of Philosophy I. He retired in October 2020. Das was president of the German Association for Asian Studies (Deutsche Gesellschaft für Asienkunde) from 2016 to 2019, and received the Hind Rattan Award in 2006, the Nav Rattan Award in 2009.

Das is of mixed Bengali and German parentage. He attended the Calcutta Medical College and the Maulana Azad College, both affiliated to the University of Calcutta for his medical preparatory education. He returned to Germany in 1974, where he studied Indology, Islamic studies and Tamilology at the University of Cologne and the University of Hamburg, obtaining all his degrees from the latter. Through his teachers Klaus Ludwig Janert and Albrecht Wezler, students of Paul Thieme, he was influenced by the stringent principles of philological research. He applied these principles when he instituted, in 2000, the new subject of South Asian Studies (Südasienkunde) at his university.

Das has published on a variety of subjects ranging from Vedic linguistics through South Asian Islam and Tamil to Security Studies. His particular areas of interest are Bengal and Bengali, as well as traditional South Asian medicine. One of his major publications in the context of Bengali is his Lehrbuch der modernen bengalischen Hochsprachen, a comprehensive teaching device for and grammar of Bengali in German.

In 2006, Das initiated the interdisciplinary Working Group on Post-classical South Asia (Arbeitskreis Neuzeitliches Südasien) within the German Association for Asian Studies (Deutsche Gesellschaft für Asienkunde).

Das is or was the editor / co-editor of:

- Traditional South Asian Medicine
- Südasienwissenschaftliche Arbeitsblätter (Working Papers on South Asian Studies)
- Mitteilungen zur Sozial- und Kulturgeschichte der islamischen Welt (Communications on the Social and Cultural History of the Islamic World)
- Veröffentlichungen zur Indogermanistik und Anthropologie (Publications on Indo-European Studies and Anthropology)
- South Asia editor of Orientalistische Literaturzeitung (Review of Literature on the Orient)
- South Asia editor of the new (3rd) edition of Kindlers Literatur Lexikon
