= Hamne Gandhi Ko Maar Diya =

- Theatrical release poster
- Directed by: Naeem A. Siddiqui
- Screenplay by: Sanjay Rai
- Story by: Naeem A. Siddiqui
- Produced by: Naeem A. Siddiqui
- Starring: Pratima Kazmi; Subrat Dutta; Samiksha Bhatnagar; Jatin Goswami
- Cinematography: Shanti Bhushan Roy
- Edited by: Nilesh Mulye
- Music by: Anjani Kumar Tiwari; Ubaid Azam Azmi; A M Turaz; Rana
- Production company: Touchwood Multimedia Creations
- Distributed by: Indian Film Studios (Utpal Acharya)
- Release date: 2 March 2018
- Running time: 120 minutes
- Country: India
- Language: Hindi

Hamne Gandhi Ko Maar Diya is a Hindi movie produced and directed by Naeem A. Siddqui. It was released on 2 March 2018 all over India, this movie is inspired by non-violence movements taken by Mahatma Gandhi (Mohan Das Karamchand Gandhi) during his struggle for Independent India from 1915 to 1947. The film was originally titled as Hey Ram Humne Gandhi Ko Maar Diya, but the name was snipped by the Central Board of Film Certification.

== Plot ==
This is a story of two completely opposite ideologies, revolving around two strangers who met during a train journey on 28 January 1948. Amidst an atmosphere of terror, communal riots, and fear, we find Kailash (Jatin Goswami) travelling from Calcutta to Sasaram with his wife, Sudha (Sameeksha Bhatnager), and their daughter to meet his mother, Savitri (Pratima Kazmi). On the other side is Divakar (Subrat Dutta), who is returning to his village to assume the responsibility of a teacher.

Kailash has lost everything during the "Direct Action Day" riots in Calcutta and harbours a strong belief that Gandhi was responsible for the partition of India. Conversely, Divakar holds his own views and believes in Gandhi's philosophy of non-violence, tolerance, and the embracing of all religions. The events that unfold during their two-day journey have a significant impact on both individuals, prompting them to reflect on who is right and who is wrong.

As they reach their destination and conclude their journey, they discover that Gandhi has been assassinated. The assassination of Gandhi and the subsequent events serve as a reflection of these two differing ideologies.

== Cast ==
- Pratima Kazmi
- Subrat Dutta
- Samikssha Bhatnagar as Sudha Singh
- Jatin Goswami

== Release ==
The new poster was unveiled on 31 January 2018, coinciding with the death anniversary of Mahatma Gandhi. The official trailer of the film was released by Touchwood Multimedia Creations on 5 February 2018. The theatrical trailer of the film was released by Touchwood Multimedia Creations on 23 February 2018.

The film was theatrically released on 2 March 2018.
