= Sankar Kumar Guchhait =

Indian politician (born 1984)

Member of the West Bengal Legislative Assembly
- Incumbent
- Assumed office 4 May 2026
- Preceded by: Sujoy Hazra
- Constituency: Medinipur

Personal details
- Party: Bharatiya Janata Party
- Profession: Politician

Sankar Kumar Guchhait (born 1984) is an Indian politician from West Bengal. He is a member of the West Bengal Legislative Assembly from the Medinipur Assembly constituency in Paschim Medinipur district representing the Bharatiya Janata Party.

== Early life and education ==
Guchhait is from Medinipur, Paschim Medinipur district, West Bengal. He is the son of Sunil Kumar Guchhait. He completed his MSc at Vidyasagar University and later did his PhD, also at Vidyasagar University. He works as a high school teacher. He declared assets worth Rs.1 crore in his affidavit to the Election Commission of India.

== Career ==
Guchhait won the Medinipur Assembly constituency representing the Bharatiya Janata Party in the 2026 West Bengal Legislative Assembly election. He polled 1,33,041 votes and defeated his nearest rival and sitting MLA, Sujoy Hazra of the All India Trinamool Congress, by a margin of 38,747 votes.
