= Shiladitya Patranabis =

Indian actor

Shiladitya Patranobis (1967 – 7 November 2008) was a prominent Indian TV and Bengali film actor. He began his acting career with the Doordarshan serial Sonar Sansar in the early 1990s. He worked in the Zee Bangla serials Rajpath and Rani Kahini.

He died of kidney failure in Calcutta. He was admitted to Kothari Medical Centre and Research Institute on 14 October 2008 with jaundice. His condition kept deteriorating. He was an alcoholic and had been to rehabilitation centres on two occasions. He had one daughter, from his first marriage, who resides in Toronto, Canada.

== Filmography and Television ==
- Bibar (2006)
- Ujan
- Kuashar Araley
- Durga (Later REPLACED BY SAPTARSHI ROY)
- Rani Kahini
- Mon Porobase (Shudhu Tomari Janya)
- Hiyar Majhe
- Rajpath
- Jharna Samayer Upakatha
- Swapnoneel
- Tithir Atithi
- Aloukik
- Sathihara
- Bilambita Loy
- Jeet
- Pagla Kuthi
- Ki Holo
- Bishbrikkho
- Iska Bonner Bibi
- Janani
- Grihadaha
- Sonar Sansar
