= Zameen (2003 film) =

2003 Indian film by Rohit Shetty

- Theatrical release poster
- Directed by: Rohit Shetty
- Screenplay by: Suparn Verma; Robin Bhatt
- Dialogues by: Javed Siddiqui
- Story by: Suparn Verma
- Produced by: N. R. Pachisia
- Starring: Ajay Devgn; Abhishek Bachchan; Bipasha Basu
- Cinematography: V. Manikandan
- Edited by: Bunty Nagi
- Music by: Songs: Himesh Reshammiya; Score: Aadesh Shrivastava
- Production company: V.R. Entertainers
- Release date: 26 September 2003
- Running time: 154 minutes
- Country: India
- Language: Hindi
- Budget: est.₹11 crore
- Box office: est.₹17.8 crore

Zameen (transl. Land) is a 2003 Indian Hindi-language action thriller film directed by Rohit Shetty in his directorial debut. The film stars Ajay Devgn, Abhishek Bachchan and Bipasha Basu.

The plot of the film is loosely based on the Indian Airlines Flight 814 hijacking.

== Plot ==
A group of terrorists backed by Pakistan attacks the Indian Parliament. The Indian Army assigns Colonel Ranvir Singh Ranawat to lead the operation against them. Ranvir and his men successfully capture the group's leader, Baba Zaheer Khan. During the operation, however, nine soldiers are killed due to the negligence of one of Ranvir's subordinates, Captain Jaideep Rai. Ranvir holds Jaideep responsible and asks him to resign from the Army.

Some time later, Jaideep has joined the Mumbai Police and serves as an Assistant Commissioner of Police (ACP) with the Anti-Terrorism Squad (ATS). Meanwhile, members of the terrorist organisation Al-Tahir attempt to free Baba Zaheer from Army custody. Jaideep intervenes and foils their attempt.

The terrorists subsequently seek assistance from Fareed, a garage owner who has connections with the group. They are secretly supported by Professor Santhanam, who helps them obtain weapons and other resources. Their plan is to hijack a civilian aircraft and use the passengers as hostages to force the Indian government to release Baba Zaheer.

The terrorists bribe two airport employees to smuggle firearms aboard an Indian Airlines flight travelling from Mumbai to Kathmandu. The aircraft carries 107 passengers and crew, including Jaideep's fiancée Nandini, an in-flight supervisor, and Captain Basheer Ali, Jaideep's foster father and the aircraft's pilot. The terrorists hijack the plane and divert it to Kazan in Pakistan-administered Kashmir, where they are joined by other militants and receive assistance from the Pakistani authorities. They demand Baba Zaheer's release in exchange for the hostages.

Jaideep recalls his final conversation with Nandini and realises that one of the airport ground staff had remained with the aircraft until its departure. He tracks down and interrogates the employee, who confesses to helping the terrorists smuggle weapons onto the plane.

The Indian government attempts to negotiate with the Pakistani authorities for the safe release of the hostages, but the negotiations fail. With the aircraft being held in Pakistan-administered Kashmir, the Indian government is unable to obtain permission for the Army to enter the territory. The Indian Army and Mumbai Police consequently coordinate an operation to rescue the hostages. Ranvir and Jaideep are assigned to work together despite their troubled history.

Ranvir remains distrustful of Jaideep because of his earlier failure as a soldier, while Jaideep is investigating Ranvir and several members of his unit over suspected links to the terrorists and the supply of weapons to them. Despite their differences, the two gradually cooperate and devise a plan to rescue the hostages and capture the terrorists.

Unknown to them, however, information about their operation has been leaked to the terrorists. The rescue mission therefore turns into a large-scale confrontation between the Indian forces and the militants. After a prolonged gun battle, Ranvir and Jaideep succeed in rescuing the hostages and capturing Baba Zaheer.

As the aircraft leaves Kazan, Ranvir and Jaideep take Baba Zaheer aboard an Army helicopter. Rather than allowing him to return to captivity, they throw him from the helicopter, killing him.

== Cast ==
- Ajay Devgn as Col. Ranvir Singh Ranawat, Para SF
- Abhishek Bachchan as ACP Jaideep "Jai" Rai IPS, a former Captain in the Indian Army
- Bipasha Basu as Nandini Rai, Jai's fianceè
- Mukesh Tiwari as Baba Zaheer Khan, leader of Al-Tahir
- Pankaj Dheer as Captain Basheer Ali, Jai's foster father
- Mohan Joshi as Brigadier Malik, Ranvir's senior officer
- Manish Khanna as Professor Santhanam
- Arun Bali as the Pakistani Home Minister
- Kamal Chopra as Commissioner of Police
- Subrat Dutta as Major Puri
- Ramesh Goyal as Rajesh Kaul
- Madan Joshi as Prime Minister
- Raja Kapse as D. Sadanand
- Sanjay Mishra as henchman Fareed
- D. Santosh as COP Kadam
- Rajendra Sethi as ISI Chief
- Vikram Sahu as Nandini's father
- Govind Khatri as the Head of Terrorists
- Mohit Chauhan as a Terrorist
- Kunwar Aziz as a Terrorist
- Manu Malik as a Terrorist
- Amrita Arora as a dancer in the item number "Dilli Ki Sardi" (special appearance)
- Eijaz Khan as a dancer in the item song "Dilli Ki Sardi'' (special appearance)

== Soundtrack ==
Zameen

Soundtrack album by Himesh Reshammiya
- Released: 26 September 2003 (India)
- Recorded: 2003
- Venue: Mumbai
- Genre: Feature film soundtrack
- Producer: Himesh Reshammiya

Himesh Reshammiya chronology
Tere Naam (2003)	Zameen (2003)	Tum – A Dangerous Obsession (2003)

The soundtrack was composed by Himesh Reshammiya, with lyrics written by Sameer. The music was released by T-Series.

#	Title	Singer(s)
1	"Sarzameen Se" (Title song)	Shaan, K.K., Himesh Reshammiya (backup vocals)
2	"Dilli Ki Sardi"	Shweta Shetty, K.K.
3	"Mere Naal"	Hema Sardesai, Shaan
4	"Tere Sang Ek Simple Si Coffee"	Hema Sardesai, K.K.
5	"Bas Ek Baar"	Alka Yagnik, Babul Supriyo, Himesh Reshammiya (backup vocals)
6	"Dilli Ki Sardi" (Remix)	Shweta Shetty, K.K.
7	"Yehi Zameen" (Band version)	Vital Signs
8	"Yehi Zameen" (Film version)	Vital Signs, Sadhana Sargam and Shreya Ghoshal
9	"Sarzameen Se" (Instrumental)	
10	"Yehi Zameen" (Instrumental)	
