= Prem Bibhrat =

2012 Bengali film

- Release date: 6 June 2012
- Country: India
- Language: Bengali

Prem Bibhrat is a Bengali romantic comedy film directed by Archan Chakraborty, produced by Tushar Kanti Halder and Subhas Bera. This film was released on 6 June 2012.

== Plot ==
Kanchan and Nabanita are college friends who end up falling in love. Their respective fathers were also college mates having a good relationship. The respective fathers get wrong ideas about their respective son or daughter. They assume them to love somebody else due to circumstances. Finally all wrong impressions are done away with and Kanchan marries Nabanita.

== Cast ==
- Prosenjit Chatterjee as Kanchan
- June Malia as Nabanita
- Subhendu Chatterjee
- Manoj Mitra
- Chinmoy Roy
- Nayna Bandopadhyay
