= Chaturanga (film) =

2008 Indian Bengali-language film

- The poster for the film Chaturanga
- Directed by: Suman Mukherjee
- Written by: Rabindranath Tagore
- Based on: Chaturanga by Rabindranath Tagore
- Produced by: Campfire Films Production
- Starring: Rituparna Sengupta; Dhritiman Chaterji; Subrat Dutta; Joy Sengupta; Kabir Suman
- Cinematography: Indranil Mukherjee
- Edited by: Arghyakamal Mitra
- Music by: Debojyoti Mishra
- Release date: 21 November 2008
- Running time: 125 mins
- Country: India
- Language: Bengali

Chaturanga (transl. Four Chapters) is a 2008 Indian Bengali-language film directed by Suman Mukherjee, starring Rituparna Sengupta, Dhritiman Chaterji, Subrata Dutta, Joy Sengupta and Kabir Suman. Based on the 1916 novel, Chaturanga, by author Rabindranath Tagore the film is about a love caught between conflicting worlds of ideas.

== Plot ==
Set in Colonial Bengal at the turn of the twentieth century, the film weaves a rich tapestry of crisscrossing desires and moralities. The protagonist Sachish fleets from radical positivism to religious mysticism in his quest for life's meaning. However, his search ultimately yields nothing but crushing disillusionment. This is because he cannot square his abstract ideals with the powerful presences of two women in his life. One of them is Damini, a young Hindu widow, and the other is Nanibala, the abandoned mistress of Sachish's own brother. Sachish tries to convince himself that Nanibala is simply a helpless woman who needs to be 'rescued' by him. Similarly, during his later religious phase, he pretends that the widow Damini is merely an enticement of Nature that must be avoided at all costs for spiritual salvation. Chaturanga thus becomes, after a point, a psychodrama of cruelty. Nanibala becomes a victim of it because as a 'fallen woman' she can only be 'saved', but her humanity cannot be recognized. Damini is first given away by her dying husband, along with all her property, to a religious guru. She then falls in love with Sachish who can accept her only without her sexuality.

== Cast ==
- Dhritiman Chaterji as Uncle
- Rituparna Sengupta as Damini
- Subrat Dutta as Shachish
- Joy Sengupta as Shribilash
- Kabir Suman as Lilananda
- Trina Nileena Banerjee as Nanibala

== Music ==
The songs, especially those from the Vaishnav tradition, are erotic. The divine is expressed in them through allegorical depictions of the illicit love between Krishna and Radha, who was actually his aunt. There is a radical side to this blend of eroticism and divinity. Radha's love for Krishna is beyond all social norms. It is directly expressed, without the priest or the Brahmin caste coming in between. When devotees sing and rejoice in that form of love, it is thus a popular and democratic process that defies caste divisions.

1. "Allah Ke Nur—Shafqat" — Amaanat Ali & Chorus
2. "Din Thakte Tiner Sadhan" — Kartick Das Baul
3. "Bhajo Patito Udhadharana"— Arijit Chakraborty & Chorus
4. "Hara Gauri Prananath" — Dohar
5. "Esraj" — Instrumental
6. "Hari Haraye Nama" — Monomoy Chakraborty & Chorus
7. "Jagohu Brishobhanu" — Sri Bani Kumar Chatterjee & Chorus
8. "Hese Khele Nao Re Jogu" — Neel Mukherjee & Chorus
9. "Rupo Lagi Aankhi Jhure" — Raghab Chatterjee
10. "Joy Radhe Radhe" — Arijit Chakraborty & Chorus
11. "Moula Tere Bina" — Shafqat Amaanat Ali & Chorus
12. "Nirodo Nayane" — Santa Das
13. "Background Music" — Instrumental
14. "Praner Majhe Sudha (Hum)" — Parama Banerjee
15. "Radha Madhabo" — Kabir Suman & Chorus
16. "Aalo Je Amar Gaan Kore" — Parama Banerjee
