= Projapoti =

Projapoti (প্রজাপতি) may refer to:

- Projapoti: The Mysterious Bird, a 2011 Bangladeshi film
- Projapoti (2022 film), an Indian Bengali-language family drama

== See also ==
- Prajapati (disambiguation)
