= Guthlee Ladoo =

- Official release poster
- Directed by: Ishrat R Khan
- Screenplay by: Ganesh Pandit; Srinivas Abrol; Ishrat R Khan
- Story by: srinivas Abrol
- Produced by: Pradeep Rangwani
- Starring: Sanjay Mishra; Subrat Dutta; Kalyanee Mulay; Heet Sharma; Dhanay Sheth
- Cinematography: Anil Akki
- Edited by: Steven H. Bernard
- Music by: Rohan Rohan
- Production company: UV Films
- Release date: 13 October 2023
- Country: India
- Language: Hindi

Guthlee Ladoo is a 2023 Indian Hindi-language drama film Produced by Pradeep Rangwani and directed by Ishrat R Khan. Starring Sanjay Mishra, Subrat Dutta, Kalyanee Mulay and Dhanay Seth. the film was released on October 13, 2023, in theaters and is distributed by Panorama Studios.

== Production ==
Produced under the banner of UV films and distributed by Panorama Studios, the film is directed by Ishrat R Khan. The story is penned by Srinivas Abrol, screenplay and dialogue by Ganesh Pandit, Srinivas Abrol, and Ishrat R Khan. The music is composed by Rohan Rohan, and lyrics by Rohan Gokhale. Anil Akki (WICA) serves as the Director of Photography & Creative producer. R Santosh Raj serves as an Associate Creative Producer for release & Distribution. The film is edited by Steven H Bernard. The costumes are designed by Sagar Trilotkar, background Score by Amar Mohile and Action by Abbas Ali Moghul. The film was shot in the locales of Trimbakeshwar and Nashik.

== Cast ==
- Sanjay Mishra as Harishankar
- Dhanay Sheth as Guthlee
- Subrat Dutta as Mangru
- Kalyanee Mulay as Rania
- Heet Sharma as Ladoo
- Kanchan Pagare as Budhiya
- Archana Patel as Dhaniya
- Arif Shahdoli as Chaube
- Sanjay Sonu as Ganesia
