= Medinipur Assembly constituency =

Medinipur
- Constituency No. 236 for the West Bengal Legislative Assembly
- Interactive Map Outlining Medinipur Assembly Constituency

Constituency details
- Country: India
- Region: East India
- State: West Bengal
- District: Paschim Medinipur
- Lok Sabha constituency: Medinipur
- Established: 1957
- Total electors: 215,435
- Reservation: None

Member of Legislative Assembly
- 18th West Bengal Legislative Assembly
- Incumbent Dr. Shankar Guchhait
- Party: BJP
- Alliance: NDA
- Elected year: 2026
- Preceded by: Sujoy Hazra

Medinipur Assembly constituency is an assembly constituency in Paschim Medinipur district in the Indian state of West Bengal.

== Overview ==
As per orders of the Delimitation Commission, No. 236 Medinipur Assembly constituency is composed of the following: Midnapore municipality, Chandra, Dherua, Monidaha and Tantigeria gram panchayats of Midnapore Sadar community development block and Bankibandh, Garhmal, Karnagarh, Kashijora and Shatpati gram panchayats of Salboni community development block.

Medinipur Assembly constituency is part of No. 34 Medinipur (Lok Sabha constituency).

== Members of the Legislative Assembly ==
Year	Member	Party
1957	Anjali Khan	Indian National Congress
1962	Syed Shamsul Bari	Indian National Congress
1967	Kamakhya Charan Ghosh	Communist Party of India
1969	Kamakhya Charan Ghosh	Communist Party of India
1971	Biswanath Mukherjee	Communist Party of India
1972	Biswanath Mukherjee	Communist Party of India
1977	Bankim Behari Pal	Janata Party
1982	Kamakhya Charan Ghosh	Communist Party of India
1987	Kamakhya Charan Ghosh	Communist Party of India
1991	Kamakhya Charan Ghosh	Communist Party of India
1996	Purnendu Sengupta	Communist Party of India
2001	Purnendu Sengupta	Communist Party of India
2006	Santosh Rana	Communist Party of India
2011	Mrigendra Nath Maiti	Trinamool Congress
2016	Mrigendra Nath Maiti	Trinamool Congress
2021	June Malia	Trinamool Congress
2024^	Sujoy Hazra	Trinamool Congress
2026	Sankar Guchhait	Bharatiya Janata Party

- ^ by-election

== Election results ==
=== 2026 ===
2026 West Bengal Legislative Assembly election: Medinipur
Party	Candidate	Votes	%	±%
BJP	Sankar Kumar Guchhait	133,041	54.51	+14.0
AITC	Sujoy Hazra	94,294	38.63	−12.09
CPI	Manikuntal Khamrai	7,649	3.13	−2.3
NOTA	None of the above	1,628	0.67	−0.97
Majority		38,747	15.88	+5.67
Turnout		244,086	93.66	+8.36
BJP gain from AITC		Swing		

=== 2024 bypoll ===
2024 West Bengal Legislative Assembly by-election: Medinipur
Party	Candidate	Votes	%	±%
AITC	Sujoy Hazra	115,104	53.42	▲2.72
BJP	Subhajit Roy	81,108	37.64	▼2.86
CPI	Mani Kuntal Khamrui	11,892	5.52	▲0.09
INC	Shyamal Kumar Ghosh	3,959	1.84	New
Independent	Nantu Kuila	717	0.45	New
NOTA	None of the above	2,624	1.22	
Majority		33,996	146,896	68.19
Turnout		215,404		
AITC hold		Swing		

=== 2021 ===
2021 West Bengal Legislative Assembly election: Medinipur
Party	Candidate	Votes	%	±%
AITC	June Maliah	121,175	50.72	
BJP	Shamit Dash	96,778	40.51	
CPI	Tarun Kumar Ghosh	12,984	5.43	
NOTA	None of the above	3,928	1.64	
Majority		24,397	10.21	
Turnout		238,898	85.3	
AITC hold		Swing		

=== 2016 ===
2016 West Bengal Legislative Assembly election: Medinipur
Party	Candidate	Votes	%	±%
AITC	Mrigendra Nath Maiti	1,06,774	50.11	
CPI	Santosh Rana	73,787	34.63	
BJP	Tushar Mukherjee	22,567	10.59	
NOTA	None of the above	4,060	1.91	
AMB	Sova Das	2,172	1.02	
Majority		32,987	15.48	
Turnout		2,13,344	84.95	
AITC hold		Swing		

=== 2011 ===
2011 West Bengal Legislative Assembly election: Medinipur
Party	Candidate	Votes	%	±%
AITC	Mrigendra Nath Maiti	1,03,060	54.43	+24.90
CPI	Santosh Rana	74,840	39.53	−17.84
BJP	Tusar Mukharjee	4,880	2.58	
IND	Sanjay Mishra	2,590	1.37	
LJP	Arun Kumar Adhikari	1,436	0.76	
Majority		28,220	14.90	
Turnout		1,89,467	87.95	
AITC gain from CPI		Swing	42.74	

=== 2006 ===
In the 2006 state assembly elections, Santosh Rana of CPI won the 223 Midnapore assembly seat defeating his nearest rival Rama Prasad Tewary of Trinamool Congress. Contests in most years were multi cornered but only winners and runners are being mentioned. Purnendu Sengupta of CPI defeated Gouri Ghosh of Trinamool Congress in 2001, and Dinen Roy of Congress in 1996. Kamakhya Ghosh of CPI defeated Raj Kumar Mishra of Congress in 1991, Samir Roy of Congress in 1987, and Samir Roy of ICS in 1982. Bankim Behari Pal of Janata Party defeated Kamakhya Ghosh of CPI in 1977.

=== 1972 ===
Biswanath Mukherjee of CPI won in 1972 and 1971. Kamakhya Charan Ghosh of CPI won in 1969 and 1967. Syed Shamsul Bari of Congress won in 1962. Anjali Khan of Congress won in 1957.
