= Syed Shamsul Bari =

West Bengal politician

Member of West Bengal Legislative Assembly
- In office 1962–1967
- Preceded by: Anjali Khan
- Succeeded by: Kamakhya Charan Ghosh
- Constituency: Medinipur

Personal details
- Born: 1965 (age 59–60) Midnapore district, Bengal Presidency
- Party: Indian National Congress

Syed Shamsul Bari is an Indian lawyer and politician belonging to the Indian National Congress. He was the second MLA of Medinipur Assembly constituency in the West Bengal Legislative Assembly.

== Early life and family ==
Bari was born into a Bengali family of Muslim Syeds in Midnapore district, Bengal Presidency.

== Career ==
Bari contested in the 1962 West Bengal Legislative Assembly election where he ran as an Indian National Congress candidate for Medinipur Assembly constituency, defeating Marxist politician Kamakshya Charan Ghose. He lost to Ghose at the 1967 West Bengal Legislative Assembly election.
