= Nimisha =

Nimisha is an Indian feminine given name. It may refer to the following notable people:

- Nimisha Madhvani, Ugandan diplomat
- Nimisha Mehta, British actress
- Nimisha Mukerji, Canadian film and television director
- Nimisha Pandey, Indian television and Internet content developer and curator
- Nimisha Sajayan, Indian actress
- Nimisha Suresh, Indian actress
- Nimisha Suthar, Indian politician
- Nimisha Vakharia, Indian actress
