= Prajapati (novel) =

1967 novel by Indian writer Samaresh Basu

- Author: Samaresh Basu
- Language: Bengali
- Published: 1967
- Publisher: Ananda Publishers
- Publication place: India

Prajapati (lit. 'Butterfly') is a 1967 novel by Bengali author Samaresh Basu. It was first published in the puja issue of Desh, by Ananda Publishers. The novel is about a young boy who is used as the premises to understand his background and the society in which he lives.

On 2 February 1968, a lawyer named Amal Mitra filed a charge of obscenity against Basu and the publisher Shitangshu Kumar Dasgupta. The Government of West Bengal supported Mitra and spoke against Prajapati. The lower court ruled the novel is obscene and has no literary value. Calcutta High Court upheld the lower court's verdict. After seventeen years, Prajapati was unbanned after a ruling by the Supreme Court of India in its favour.

Ananda Publishers had published Prajapati as a hard-cover book before the charge of obscenity was made against it. In its second edition in 1985, soon after the verdict was overturned, it made record sales. The 11th edition of Prajapati states the first edition had a print-run of 8,800 copies but the second-to-tenth editions (from 1985 to 2003) sold 48,000 copies.

== Plot summary ==
Sukhen, the protagonist, is trying to capture a butterfly. Sukhen goes to his lover's house early in the morning. As he tries to catch a butterfly, he is talking with his lover and analysing his own life as he recollects the past. Sukhen had been brought up in a family where he had found no love or affection. His mother died, leaving behind her husband and three sons: Keshav, Purnendu, Sukhendu. Both of Sukhen's elder brothers are politicians and according to Sukhen, mere opportunists. The brothers use people for their own benefit and cheat them without remorse. Sukhen remembers his mother as a flirtatious woman, and his father is devoid of any moral depth and realisation, and is mean and money-minded. Sukhen He became adventurous and had no respect for his elders and women. Sukhen's mostly-rich neighbours feared him. Mr. Chopra, manager of neighbouring industry and Mr. Mittir, the labour advisor, flattered Sukhen out of fear. Sukhen remembers Jina, the daughter of Mr. Mittir, who had been seduced by her uncle Mr. Chatterjee, a colleague of her father. Sukhen also had seduced Jina.

Sukhen had become addicted to women and alcohol soon after having entered college. He became attracted to a woman named Shikha. Sukhen fell in love with Shikha when he was taking part in a hunger strike conducted to demand the rehabilitation of a recently dismissed teacher of the college and to stop the construction of a multi-storeyed building close to the college gate.

Shikha is from a poor family and her father is a drunkard. Shikha's two brothers were subordinates of Sukhen's brothers in Sukhen's brothers' political parties. Her only sister Bela was married but lived at her father's house and flirted with several men.

The presence of Shikha in Sukhen's life offered him respite from his careless, perplexed life. This relationship helped revive his latent sense. Sukhen hates hypocrisy and politicians who cheated and oppressed people for their own needs, and teachers who used their students as a political weapon for personal benefits. Sukhen also hates the owners and governing-body members of industries who squeeze the labourers; he also hates parents who were indifferent to their children, and those who abused children for sexual satisfaction. He also disliked the heinous attack of American soldiers on prostitutes. The atrocities around him agonised and traumatised him. He sometimes suffers from a subtle pain to his shoulder, and channelled his energy into anger to numb the pain. Sukhen urinates under his father's table, untidies his brothers' rooms, and calls out to servants to divert his attention.

Sukhen, who was otherwise brash, respected Shulada, an elderly servant of their house. Keshob, Sukhen's elder brother, is a powerful political leader who allegedly illegally traded in baby foods and railway spare parts. Keshav has several extramarital affairs with married women and young women who were members of his own party. Purnendu, Sukhen's immediate elder brother, is also a political leader and an employee in a governmental office. Purnendu's political party apparently worked for the poor and fought for justice but Purnrndu has sex with their maidservant's daughter. Both of Sukhen's brothers want him to join their parties. Sukhen refuses to join either of them and severely criticises their agendas. Sukhen becomes the enemy of both groups.

Sukhen breaks off one wing of the butterfly; Shikha tries to revive it but the butterfly eventually dies. After having talked with Shikha, Sukhen leaves for home but instead goes to visit Nirapadbabu, a primary school master watching Ramesh, a worker of Purnendu's party, delivering a lecture. He wonders about Nirapadababu's peaceful life and dreams of having a wife like Nirapadababu's. Sukhen plans to marry Shikha and live peacefully like Nirapadababu. Sukhen also enjoys the company of N’Kori Haldar, the superintendent of police at the local police station; and Bimal, a devoted worker of Purnendu's party. As he thinks of living a simple life with Shikha as his wife, Sukhen goes to see Mr. Chopra and get himself a job but Chopra refuses him, knowing Sukhen is a hooligan. Perturbed, Sukhen wonders who are the simple and good boys?

Sukhen goes in search of his friend Shutka but finds Shibe, another friend of his, in Dayalda's tea stall. Suddenly, Sukhen feels the strange pain close to his shoulder; to suppress it, he drinks alcohol and goes to Shibe's house, where he meets Manjari and falls asleep. In the evening, Sukhen awakens and finds Shutka close to him. Sukhen goes to Shikha's house, where he had promised to go that evening. Sukhen returns home at night, takes a bath and sleeps without having eaten. The next day, there is a strike. In the evening, Sukhen goes out and finds himself in the midst of two processions. He is severely injured in a bomb explosion and is admitted in a hospital. One of Sukhen's arms has been blown off and he finally dies due to the injury.

== Controversies ==
=== Charge ===
On 2 February 1968, Bengali lawyer Amal Mitra complained in the court of Chief Presidency Magistrate in Calcutta Prajapati "contains matters which are obscene and both the accused persons have sold, distributed, printed and exhibited the same which has the tendency to corrupt the morals of those in whose hands the said Sharadiya Desh may fall". Both Samaresh Basu and Shitangshu Kumar Dasgupta, the publisher and printer of Desh, were said to have committed an offence punishable under Section 292 of the Indian Penal Code (IPC) and under Section 292 read with Section 109 IPC (abetment).

=== Supreme Court trial ===
Samaresh Basu and the owners of Desh appealed to the Supreme Court of India on 9 July 1973 by Special Leave according to Article 136 of the Indian Constitution. This appeal was fixed with Justice H. R. Khanna and Justice Algiri Swami on 24 August 1973. The Supreme Court accepted the appeal against the order of High Court of Calcutta, giving the case the appeal number 174/1973 for Samaresh Basu and Shitangshu Kumar Dasgupta versus Amal Mitra and West Bengal Government.

On 24 September 1985, the Supreme Court announced its verdict, declaring Prajapati free from obscenity and all overturned the complaints about Samaresh Basu and Shitangshu Kumar Dasgupta. The court concluded:

On a very anxious consideration and after carefully applying our judicial mind in making an objective assessment of the novel, we do not think that it can be said with any assurance that the novel is obscene merely because slang and unconventional words have been used in the book in which there have been emphasis on sex and description of female bodies and there are the narrations of feelings, thoughts and actions in vulgar language.

It took 12 years and the verdict of the Supreme Court for the novel to be cleared of charges. Sagarmoy Ghosh, the working editor of Desh of that time, noted this event as an historical landmark in Bengali literature. He said there were some books that got banned and subsequently released from conviction from the local court. He also said he did not know of any such event like Prajapati that had gone on to face conviction for seventeen years. Following the Supreme Court's verdict, the novel was republished.

=== Effects of judgement ===
Several important propositions were raised on the law of obscenity in India while dealing with this case, such as the definition of obscenity and the determinants of obscenity in literature. ‘…legal concept used to characterize certain (particularly sexual) material as offensive to the public sense of decency. A wholly satisfactory definition of obscenity is elusive, however, largely because what is considered obscene is often, like beauty, in the eye of the beholder. Although the term originally referred to things considered repulsive, it has since acquired a more specifically sexual meaning.

The conviction was made about using slang words in Prajapati that were unfamiliar with the literature of the time. P. M. Bakshi stated in his article "The Need for a New Convention":

... the mere fact that the language used was vulgar would not be enough to render the book as obscene. Vulgar writing is not necessarily obscene. The essence of obscenity of a novel is the effect of depraving, debasing and corrupting the morals of the readers of the novel. Vulgarity may arouse disgust and revulsion but does not necessarily corrupt the morals of the reader.

== Adaptation ==
In 1993, an Indian Bengali-language film Prajapati was made by Biplab Chatterjee based on the novel. Soumitra Chatterjee, Satabdi Roy, Robi Ghosh and Mamata Shankar acted in the film.
