= Samaresh Basu =

Indian writer (1924–1988)

- Born: 11 December 1924; Bikrampur, Bengal Presidency, British India
- Died: 12 March 1988 (aged 63); Calcutta, West Bengal, India
- Citizenship: Indian
- Occupation: Writer
- Spouse: Gauri Basu (m. 1942)
- Writing career
- Pen name: Kalkut
- Notable works: Prajapati, Dekhi Nai Phire, Shamba, Ganga
- Notable awards: Sahitya Akademi Award (1980)

Samaresh Basu (Bengali pronunciation: [/səˈmɑːrɛʃ/]; 11 December 1924 – 12 March 1988) was an Indian writer in modern Bengali literature, known for his versatility and vast range of themes. He wrote under the pen name Kalkut. Basu was awarded the 1980 Sahitya Akademi Award in Bengali, by Sahitya Akademi, India's National Academy of Letters, for his novel, Shamba. He won the 1983 Filmfare Awards for Best Story for Namkeen.

== Biography ==
Basu was born on 11 December 1924 in Bikrampur, Dhaka (present day Bangladesh). He married Gauri Basu in 1942. In his early days, he worked at a factory at Ichapore, West Bengal. He was imprisoned between 1940 and 1950 for his involvement in trade unions and Communist party. It was in prison, he penned his first published novel, Uttaranga. After release, he devoted his time entirely to writing, refusing his old job offer. He wrote over 200 short stories and 100 novels under the pen names, Kalkut and Bhromor, revolving around themes of political activism, middle class life and sexuality, two of which were banned for a brief period with charges of obscenity.

Basu received the Sahitya Akademi Award for Shambo in 1980 and Filmfare Award for Namkeen in 1983.

Samaresh Basu died on 12 March 1988.

== Works ==
- Aam Mahato
- Aboseshe
- Achinpurer Kathokata
- Apadartho (Ananda Pub.)
- Aparichito (Sahityam,1985)
- Baghini
- Bathan
- Bibar (Ananda Publishers, 1965), made as a film in 2006, it is also mentioned in Mrinal Sen's 1971 film Interview.
- Bibekban/Bhiru
- Bijon Bibhui (Ananda Pub.)
- Bijorito (Anjali Prakashoni)
- B.T. Roader Dhare, translated as The Hollow by Saugata Ghosh
- Chaya Dhaka Mon
- Daho
- Dekhi Nai Phire (Ananda Pub.)
- Dosh Deen Pore (Ananda Pub.,1986)
- Dui Aronyo (Anjali Prakashoni)
- Ganga (Maushumi Prakasani,1974)
- Goenda Ashok Thakur Samogro (Anjali Prakashoni)
- Hariey Pawa (Nath Publishing)
- Hridayer Mukh
- Jabab (Deys Publishing,1986)
- Jhile Nagar (Karuna Prakashoni)
- Jug Jug Jiye (Ananda Pub. & Lokbharati,1990)
- Kamona Basona
- Ke Nebe More
- Khondita (Ananda Pub.)
- Mahakaler Rother Ghora, translated in English as Fever (Ananda Publishers)
- Marsumer Ek Din (Annyadhara, 1979)
- Mohamaya (Modern Publishers,1988)
- Nithur Dorodee
- l'Noyonpurer Mati (Nath Publishing)
- Padokkhep
- Pancho Bonhi (Sahityam)
- Pathik
- Patok (Anjali Prakashoni)
- Prajapati (Ananda Publishers,1985)
- Prakriti
- Pran Protima
- Punaryatra (Ananda Pub.)
- Raktim Basonto
- Ranir Bazar (Nath Publishing)
- Samaresh Basu Rochonaboli [1–13] (Ananda Pub.)
- Shalgherir Simanay
- Sekol Chera Haater Khoje (Ananda Pub.,1984)
- Swarnochanchu
- Tanaporen (Anjali Prakashoni)
- Teen Purush (Ananda Pub.)
- Tin Bhubaner Pare (Maushumi Prakasani,1982)
- Uddhar (Mandal, 1986)

== Works as Kalkut ==
- Amrita Bisher Patre (Ananda Publishers)
- Amrita Kumbher Sandhaney, translated as In Search of the Pitcher of Nectar (Bengal Publishers Pvt Ltd, 1954)
- Arab Sagorer Jol Lona
- Dhyan Jnan Prem (Ananda Pub.)
- Ek Je Chhilen Raja (Ananda Pub.)
- Juddher Shesh Senapoti (M.C.Sarkar & Sons)
- Kalkut Rachona Samagro [1–8] (Maushumi Prakasani)
- Kothaay Pabo Tarey (Ananda Pub.)
- Ponnyo Bhume Punya Snan (Ananda Pub.)
- Pritha (Mondal Book House, 1957)
- Purno Kumbho Punascho (Ananda Pub.)
- Shambo (Ananda Pub.)
- Prachetosh

== Works for children ==
- Adrisya Manusher Haatchani (Sarodiya Suktara, 1986)
- Bandha Ghore'r Awaz (Ananda Pub., Nov 1979)
- Bhul Barite Dhuke (Ananda Pub., 1986, Sarodiya Anondomela, 1985)
- Bideshi Garite Bipod (Ananda Pub., Apr 1988, Sarodiya Anondomela, 1987)
- Buno Hati'r Bandhuttwo (Pujabarshiki Anondomela Sankalan, Sarodiya Anondomela, 1977, illustration – Sudhir Maitro)
- Goa i Gogoler Prothom Kirti (Pujabarshiki Anondomela Sankalan, Sarodiya Anondomela, 1978)
- Gogol Amonibas (Nath Publishing)
- Gogol Chikkus Nagalande (Ananda Pub.)
- Gorokhkhonathbabur Notebook (Pakhik Anondomela Sera Sankalan, 25 June 1986, illustration – Debashish Deb)
- Jangal Mohol E Gogol (Ananda Pub., 1987, Sarodiya Anondomela, 1986)
- Jonaki Bhuter Bari (Pujabarshiki Anondomela Sankalan, Sarodiya Anondomela, 1980, illustration – Sunil Shil)
- Jwor'er Ghore Shona (Pakhik Anondomela Sera Sankalan,23 December 1987, illustration – Anup Roy)
- Sei Gari'r Khoje (Ananda Pub., Aug 1984, Sarodiya Anondomela, 1983)
- Simul Gore'r Khune Bhut (Ananda Pub.)

== Gogol ==
Samaresh Basu created two fictional detective characters: Gogol for children, and Ashok Thakur for adults. Gogol, the child detective, is more famous and widely read. Most of the Gogol stories are assembled in the Gogol Omnibus. Notable ones include:

- Aayna Niye Khelte Khelte
- Adrishya Manusher Haatchani (Sarodiya Suktara, 1986)
- Buno Hati'r Bandhuttwo (Sarodiya Anondomela, 1977)
- Chora Hati Shikari
- Durger Garhkhai Er Durghatono
- Garadheen Jaanalay Rakkhos
- Gogol Kothay? (Sarodiya Anondomela, 1981)
- Gogoler Keramati
- Gogoler Royraja Uddhar
- Harano Buddhagupti
- Indurer Khut khut
- Jonaki Bhuter Bari (Sarodiya Anondomela, 1980)
- Kairong Moth Er Gogoler Kando
- Mahishmardini Uddhar
- Pashchimer Balcony Theke
- Rajdhani Expresser Hatya Rahasya
- Ratna Rahasya O Gogol
- Sonali Parer Rahashya
- Telephone Aaripatar Bipad (Sarodiya Suktara)

== Adaptations ==
=== Films ===
A number of films are based on his works including-

- Ganga (1960) by Rajen Tarafdar
- Kuhak (1960) by Agradoot
- Nirjan Saikate (1963) by Tapan Sinha
- Teen Bhubaner Pare (1969) by Ashutosh Bandhopadhyay
- Aparichita (1969) by Salil Dutta
- Swarna Shikhor Prangane (1970) by Piyush Basu
- Calcutta 71 (1972) by Mrinal Sen
- Mouchak (1974) by Aurobindo Mukhopadhyay
- Chhera Tamsuk (1974) by Purnendu Pattrea
- Bikele Bhorer Phool ( 1974) by Piyush Basu
- Chhutir Phande (1975) by Salil Sen and Honeymoon (2018) by Premendra Bikash Chaki (a remake of Chhutir Phande)
- Kitaab (1977) and Namkeen (1982) by Gulzar
- Shoukheeen (1982) directed by Basu Chatterjee
- Amrita Kumbher Sandhane (1982) by Dilip Roy
- Paar (1984) by Goutam Ghose
- Genesis (1986) by Mrinal Sen
- Prajapati (1993) by Biplab Chatterjee
- Uttara (2000) by Buddhadeb Dasgupta
- Nater Guru (2003) by Haranath Chakraborty
- Bibar (2006) by Subrata Sen
- In 2013, a film adaptation of Basu's story, Sonali Parer Rahashya of Gogol Omnibus, was released with the title Goyenda Gogol. Directed by Arindam Dey, the film featured child actor Ahijit Ghosh as Gogol, along with veteran actors like Indraneil Sengupta, Saheb Chatterjee and Rachana Banerjee.
- A sequel of Goyenda Gogol, named Gogoler Kirti was released in 2014. Directed by Pompy Ghosh Mukherjee, the film is based on two stories by Samaresh Basu: "Royraja Uddhar" and "Mahishmardini Uddhar". Actor Ahijit Ghosh reprising his role as Gogol from the previous film.
