= Nilanjana Sengupta =

Indian actress

Nilanjanaa Sengupta
- Born: 21 February 1975 (age 51); Kolkata, India
- Occupations: Actor, writer, producer
- Years active: 1998–present
- Spouse: Jisshu Sengupta (m. 2004)
- Children: 2
- Mother: Anjana Bhowmik
- Relatives: Chandana Sharma (sister)

Nilanjanaa Sengupta (née Sharma) is an actress. She played the role of Mona Joshi, in the show Hip Hip Hooray. Her debut movie was director Swapan Saha's film Agni. She is a graduate of English literature. She produced the television serial Tomay Amay Mile.

She is the daughter of Anjana Bhowmik. Her younger sister Chandana Sharma is also an actress. She is married to Bengali actor Jisshu Sengupta and has two daughters named Sara Sengupta and Zara Sengupta.

== Television ==
=== As actor /TELEVISION ===
- Hip Hip Hurray .... Mona (Zee Tv)
- Sansar (Zee Tv)
- Saturday Suspense (Zee Tv)
- Mrityudand (Zee Tv)
- Darr (Star Plus)
- Star Best Sellers (Star Plus)
- Rishtey (Zee Tv)
- Jaaneman Jaaneman .... Maya
- Lekin Woh Sach Tha
- Aporajito (Star Jalsha)
- Shudhu Tomari Jonnyo (ETV Bangla)
- Ssshhh Koi Hai as Radhika Episode mask/mukhauta

As an ACTOR / FILMS

1. Shopner Feriwala
2. Teen Ekke Teen
3. Amra

=== As producer ===
- Ghosh and Company (2008)
- Dancing Star (2009)
- Aporajito (2011)
- Tomay Amay Mile (2013)
- Antakshari Premiere League (2013)
- Shesh Theke Shuru (2014)
- Shob Choritro Kalponik (2015)
- Shonge Srijit (2015)
- Bhalobasha Bhalobasha (2016)
- Jhumur (2017)
- Horogouri Pice Hotel (2022)
- Love Biye Aaj Kal(2023)
- Anondi (2024)
- Amader Dadamoni (2025)

== Filmography ==
- Swapner Feriwala (2003)
- Teen Ekke Teen (2006)
- Aamra (2007)

== Awards ==
- 2003: BFJA-Most Promising Actress Award for Swapner Pheriwala
