= Nil Nirjane =

- DVD cover of Nil Nirjane
- Directed by: Subrata Sen
- Written by: Subrata Sen
- Produced by: Rajesh Kumar Rungta
- Starring: Moonmoon Sen; Raima Sen; June Malliah; Ayan Mitra; Mou Sultana; Cactus; Rajatava Dutta
- Cinematography: Sirsha Ray
- Edited by: Rabiranjan Maitra
- Music by: Debojyoti Mishra, Cactus
- Distributed by: Piyali Films
- Release date: 14 February 2003
- Running time: 109 minutes
- Country: India
- Language: Bengali

Nil Nirjane (Bengali: নীল নির্জনে, Vacation Blues) is an Indian Bengali movie, released in 2003. It is the first movie in India that was shot on a digital platform and is often credited as the first digital film in north India. Directed by Subrata Sen, the movie featured Moonmoon Sen, Raima Sen, June Malliah, Ayan Mitra, Mou Sultana and Rajatava Dutta. This is the only movie where Moonmoon Sen and Raima Sen, the real-life mother and daughter of Indian cinema, play reel-life mother-daughter roles. Nil Nirjane also saw the performance of Cactus, a Bengali rock band of Calcutta.

== Plot ==
Nil Nirjane is set in a holiday resort where several people have come to spend their weekend. An interesting urban milieu far away from the humdrums of Kolkata were created when we see an unwed mother with an adolescent daughter, a widower father with an adolescent daughter, and an unwed couple. While relationships among unknown people start developing, the manager of the resort leads a slow life and gets entangled with a tribal girl. Suddenly the Cactus band arrives in the resort to shoot for their music video album and the serenity of the place is disturbed…

The film starts with a music video-like title, where glimpses of the story to follow are showcased. Immediately afterwards, Jaya and his boyfriend Aman enter the resort looking for a room. In the resort we find the single-mother, played by Moonmoon Sen with her daughter, played by real-life daughter Raima Sen. Mou and her father are there to spend the weekend. A friendship develops between Mou and Raima, which gradually emerges as a love entanglement.

Cactus, the rock band from Kolkata arrives for a music video and the place is filled with songs, which emerge in music-video format.

Meanwhile, the Jaya-Aman duo, sensing that the relationship is not going to last long go for a suicide pact. People in the resort save them from dying and they leave for the city, with the resort in its original serenity.

== Cast ==
- Moonmoon Sen as Unwed mother
- Raima Sen as Ria
- Ayan Mitra as Aman
- June Malia as Jaya
- Mou Sultana ... Mou
- Rajatava Dutta ... Brigadier
- Cactus ... Cactus members

== Promotion ==
Nil Nirjane is the first digital full-length feature film made in India. It was entirely on digital video format and later converted into celluloid, with astounding results. This is a film that has used sync sound after a long time in an Indian film. Says the director Subrata Sen, "This was an experiment for all us to try out the technology that has emerged as a boon for the independent filmmakers. With the final print in hand, we can now say that Nil Nirjane is a path breaking movie in Indian context."

This was the first Bengali film that got a nationwide release in Bombay, Delhi, Pune and Bangalore simultaneously.

Nil Nirjane created many controversies with the purists terming it "outrageous" for the lesbian and sex scenes. The controversy helped the movie in the box-office and ran for 50 days in the city halls.

== Awards ==
- Best Experimental Film Award at Down Under Film Festival, Australia
- Uttamkumar Award for Best Music
- Best Promising Actress to Raima Sen by BFJA.
