= Mrigendra Nath Maiti =

Indian politician (1946 – 2020)

Mrigendra Nath Maiti (1946 – 7 December 2020) was an Indian (West Bengal State) politician from West Bengal. He was a two time member of the West Bengal Legislative Assembly representing the All India Trinamool Congress from Medinipur Assembly constituency. He won the 2011 West Bengal Legislative Assembly election and retained the seat for Trinamool Congress in the 2016 West Bengal Legislative Assembly election. He died on 7 December 2020.

== Early life and education ==
Maiti was from Medinipur, Paschim Medinipur district, West Bengal. He was the son of late Kedarnath Maiti. He completed his MA at Rabindra Bharati University in 1971. He was a retired government employee and his wife was a teacher.

== Career ==
He also served as the chairman of Midnapore Kharagpur Development Authority (M.K.D.A.) and the state General Secretary of Paschim Bangya Rajya Sarkari Karmachari Federation (Unified).

He won the 2011 West Bengal Legislative Assembly election from Medinipur Assembly constituency representing the All India Trinamool Congress. He polled 103,060 votes and defeated his nearest rival, Santosh Rana of the Communist Party of India, by a margin of votes. He retained the seat in the 2016 West Bengal Legislative Assembly election.

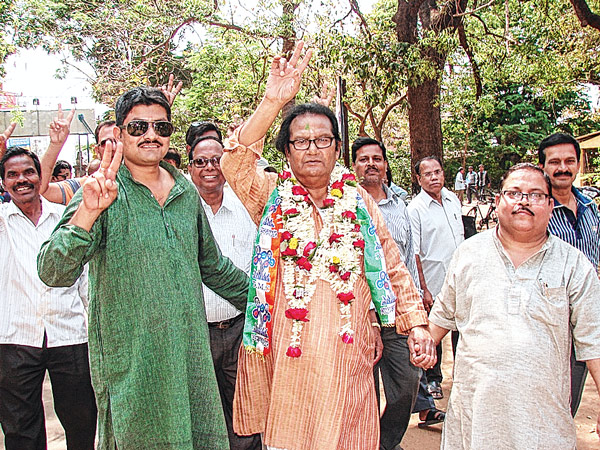
At the time of filing nomination

== In Assembly Election of 2016 ==
West Bengal assembly elections, 2016: Medinipur				
Party	Candidate	Votes	%	±%
AITMC	Mrigendra Nath Maiti	106,774		
CPI	Santosh Rana	73,787		
BJP	Tushar Mukherjee	22,567		
Amra Bangali	Sova Das	2,171		
SUCI	Sushanta Sahoo	2,069		
AJSU	Sk.Aliuddin Ali	1,655		
NOTA		4,060		

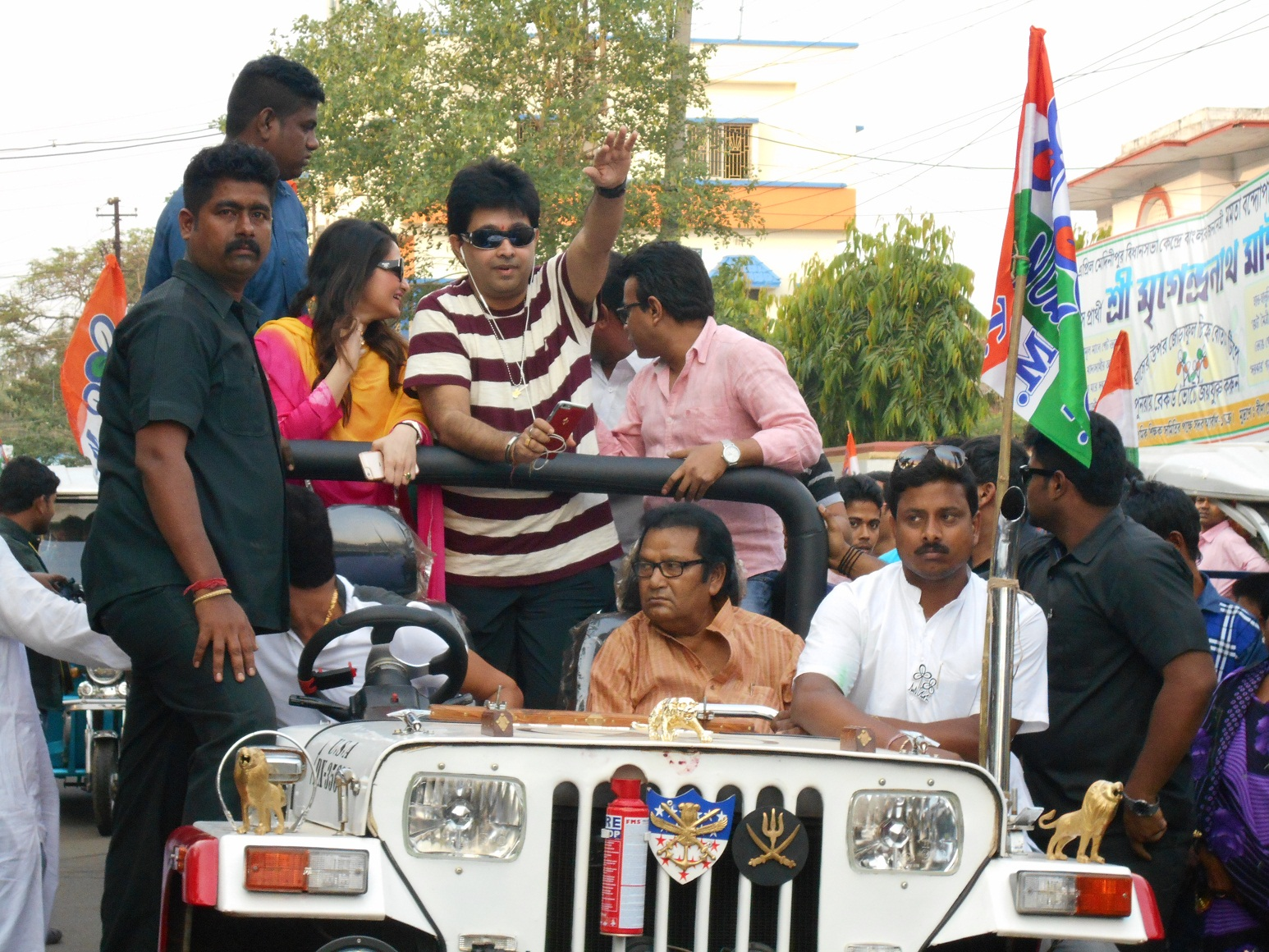
Jit Ganguly, Rudranil & Tanushree in a road show with Mrigendra Nath Maiti

== In Assembly Election of 2011 ==
West Bengal assembly elections, 2011: Medinipur				
Party	Candidate	Votes	%	±%
AITMC	Mrigendra Nath Maiti	103,060	54.43%	+24.90#
CPI	Santosh Rana	74,840	39.53%	
BJP	Subhajit Roy	4,880	2.58%	
LJP	Arun Kumar Adhikari	1,436		
Independent	Dilip Kumar Das	724		
Independent	Sanjay Mishra	2,590		
Independent	Pradyot Saw	699		
JMM	Sunil Kumar Hembram	691		
JD(S)	Pratap Kumar Roy	42		
Turnout		189,348	88.32%	
		Swing	42.74	

== See also ==
- Mamata Banerjee
- All India Trinamool Congress
- Suvendu Adhikari
