= Prajapati (film) =

Indian film directed by Biplab Chatterjee

Prajapati is a 1993 Bengali social drama film directed by Biplab Chatterjee and produced by Rajesh Kumar based on a novel of the same name by Samaresh Basu. In 1968, a criminal case for obscenity was filed against Basu and the publisher of the novel.

== Plot ==
Sukhen, a young man lives a casual life. He is innocent but neglected by his family. Sukhen loves Shikha and wants to live a normal and healthy life but his brothers are corrupt as well as politically powerful, and they try to use unemployed Sukhen for their political mileage.

== Cast ==
- Biplab Chatterjee as Sukhendu Chatterjee
- Soumitra Chatterjee as Sukhendu's father
- Dipankar Dey as Sukhendu's elder brother
- Rabi Ghosh as Doctor
- Satabdi Roy as Sikha
- Mamata Shankar
- Dilip Roy
- Soma Mukherjee
- Sandip Ghosh
