= Cactus (Indian band) =

Indian Bengali rock band

CACTUS
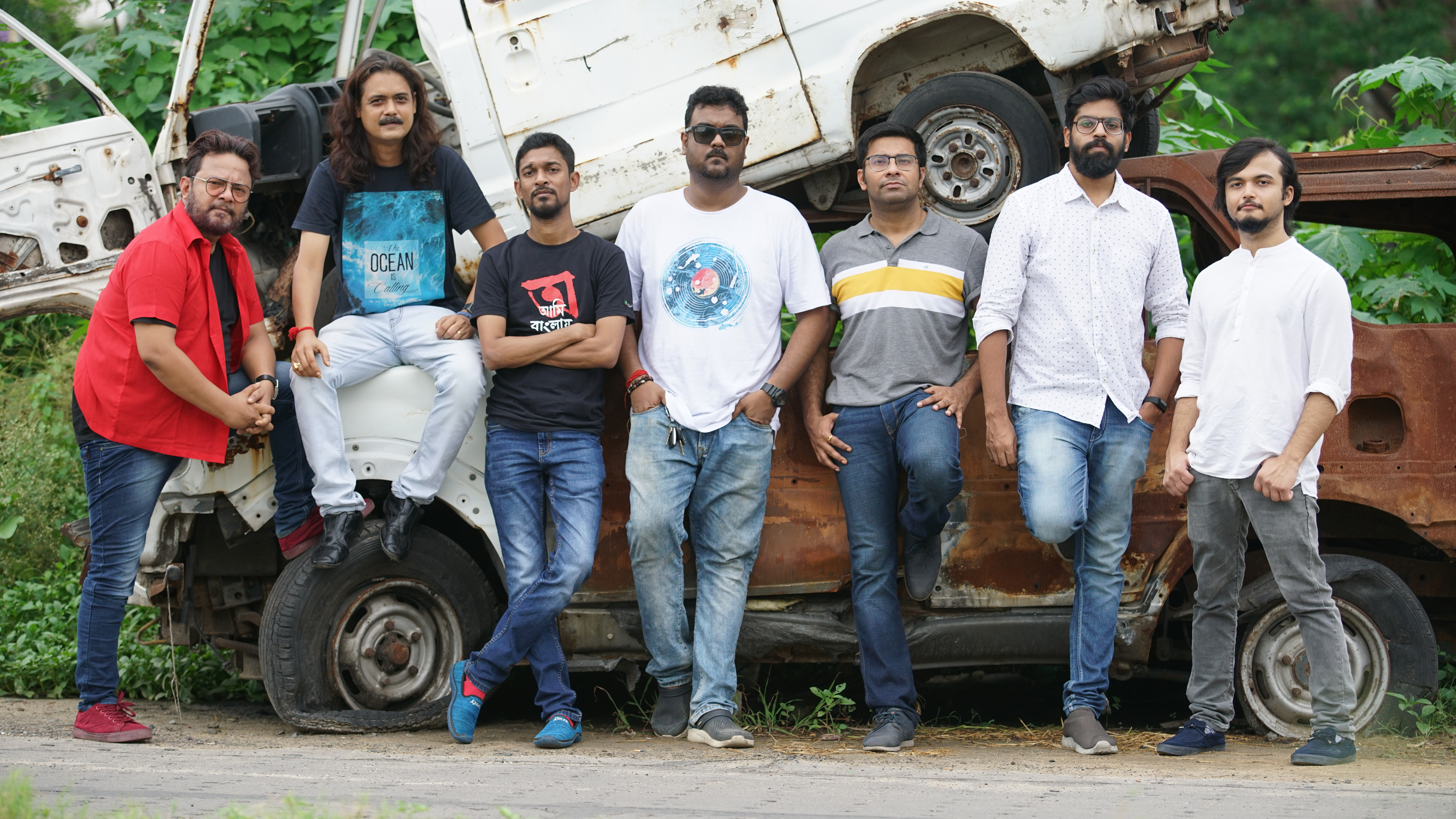
- Cactus photoshoot in Kolkata

Background information
- Origin: Kolkata, West Bengal, India
- Genre: Bengali rock
- Years active: 1992–2019, 2021—Present
- Labels: Saregama India Limited; Sunnyo Media Pvt. Ltd. Asha Audio
- Members: Sidhartha Sankar "Sidhu" Ray; Abhijit "Pata" Barman; Boidurjyo Chowdhury; Samrat Banerjee; Sayantan Chatterjee; Proshanto Mahato; Arnab Tabla Dasgupta
- Past members: Sanjay; Sukanti; Kanishka (Pinky); Shubayan; Rajesh; Sayak; Indra; Allan; Sandip Roy; Abhirup Biswas; Subhajit Bhowmick; Saqi; Shibaji Baji Paul; Sudipto Buti Banerjee

Cactus (Bengali: ক্যাকটাস) is an Indian Bengali rock band from Kolkata, West Bengal, India. Since inception they have recorded five full-length studio albums and have performed over 2500 concerts across India & abroad.

== History ==
In the early nineties, the average Bengali youth was restless with the farcical social – political system, the apprehensions of globalization and a sense of alienation. In 1990, the music scene in Bengal was a complete contrast to the present one.

Moreover, the average Bengali was not used to the idea of Bangla rock. A very small percentage of the mass would listen to rock music which was essentially in the English language. There was also a severe lack of identification with the local music culture which was only doing English rock music. This led to a sense of dissatisfaction, leaving the youth disoriented and confused.

The band name "CACTUS" was derived "from the fact that the music scene was then devoid of life as in a desert".

Cactus was formed in 1992. The band has named Deep Purple, Pink Floyd, Led Zeppelin, Iron Maiden and many others as their inspiration. Cactus is one of the first professional Bangla rock bands.

The professional debut of the band occurred on 6 March 1993 at Aban Mahal (CLT), Kolkata. Cactus have had several line-up changes.

=== Early years and self-titled debut album (1992–1999) ===
The self-titled debut album, released in 1999 from His Master's Voice, became a rage with a touch of blues and psychedelic rock. With numbers like Brishti, oooh Ma! and Icchamati this album portrayed psychedelia in Bengali music for the first time. Halud pakhi, on the other hand created a long lasting sensation in the contemporary Bengali music scene with its nostalgic feel being perfectly accompanied by Shudhu Tumi Ele Na and Amra Bhishon Eka complementing the overall mood of the album. They tasted some success when their first self-titled album was released in 1999 by His Master's Voice.

Line up – Sidhartha Sankar "Sidhu" Ray [vocals], Sibaji "Baji" Paul [drums], Sanjay [guitar], Kanishka (Pinky) Sarkar [keyboard], Shubayan Ganguly [bass], Rajesh Lahiri [vocal]

=== Films: Nil Nirjane (2001–2002) ===
In 2002, Cactus composed and performed the score for the Bengali movie Nil Nirjane. The song "Mon" from the soundtrack became extremely popular and is still a crowd favourite. A Hindi version of the song was used as the intro song for Love Story, a TV series in SAB TV.

Line up – Sidhartha Sankar "Sidhu" Ray [vocals], Sibaji "Baji" Paul [drums], Sanjay Bhattacharya [guitar], Kanishka (Pinky) Sarkar [keyboard], Shubayan Ganguly [bass], Abhijit Barman (Pota) [vocal]

=== Rajar Raja (2002–2004) ===
The band released its second album titled Rajar Raja in 2004. The band with this album moved ahead and incorporated new sounds. Different genres of music were experimented within the album. "Buddho Heshechhen" and "Lash Kata Ghore" being examples of classic rock, flirting with folk rock in "Bodhu re", while "Rajar Raja" portrays influences from funk rock. Though this album had new sounds, the nostalgic quotient was very much there with songs like "Udaaner Gaan", "Krishti", "Ude Jete Chay" and "Kamalar Swami" representing blues and the psychedelic facet of the band sound.

Line up – Sidhartha Sankar "Sidhu" Ray [vocals], Sibaji "Baji" Paul [drums], Sanjay Bhattacharya [guitar], Kanishka (Pinky) Sarkar [keyboard], Sandip Roy [bass], Abhijit Barman (Pota) [vocal].

=== Tuchho (2004–2008) ===
The band released its third album, Tuccho, in 2008. The band with this album moved ahead and has incorporated new sounds. Different genres of music were being experimented with in the album. Traces of hard rock was clearly visible. They were then featured in the Rock Street Journal's February 2009 issue. Tuccho contained the hits "Bhalo Theko" and "Rater Pari".

Line up – Sidhartha Sankar "Sidhu" Ray [vocals], Sibaji "Baji" Paul [drums], Allan Ao [guitar], Sudipto Banerjee [keyboard], Sandip Roy [bass], Sayak Bandyopadhay [vocals]

=== Blah Blah Blah (2013) ===
Blah Blah Blah was their fourth album. It was considered an experimental album. Asha Audio produced the album and it was published on 3 October 2013. The album contained remastered versions of "Nil Nirjane", "Noah" and "Mon" in addition to new tracks.

Line up – Sidhartha Sankar "Sidhu" Ray [vocals], Sibaji "Baji" Paul [drums], Ritaprabha "Ratul" Ray [guitar], Sudipto Banerjee [keyboard], Sandip Roy [bass], Dibyendu Mukherjee [vocal]

=== Tobuo Thik Acche (2017–2019) ===
In 2017, Abhijit Barman (Pota) left the band due to differences in opinion. By then the band had already started working on their next album Tobuo Thik Acche. They had to rework some of the tracks. The four songs were released one by one from 2017 to 2019.

line up- Siddhartha Sankar "Sidhu" Ray [vocals], Sibaji "Baji" Paul [drums], Ritaprabha "Ratul" Ray [guitar], Sudipto "Buti" Banerjee [keyboard], Mainak "Bumpy" Nag Chowdhury, Dibyendu Mukherjee [vocal]

The band organised a World Aids Day concert called Plug n Play at the Madhusudan Mancha with OFFER (Organisation for Friends, Energies and Resources), an NGO which works with HIV positive children. It was an event featuring several local bands before a finale that saw Chandrabindoo, Lakkhichhara and Cactus performing together after 18 years.

== Musical style and influences ==
The self-titled album and the two later albums combine soft rock, blues and psychedelic rock. Their album Tuchho has traces of hard rock, although two songs (Bhalo Theko and Shabdhane Raasta Perio) more closely resemble soft rock. Their latest album Tobuo Thik Acche is in the rock n' roll genre with up-tempo songs.

== Band members ==
Former members

- Mainak "Bumpy" Nag Chowdhury – bass
- Sanjay – guitar
- Kanishka (Pinky) – keyboard
- Shubayan – bass
- Rajesh Lahiri – vocals
- Sayak – vocals
- Allan – guitar
- Sandip Roy – bass
- Shibaji "Baji" paul – drums
- Dibyendu (Dibs) – vocal
- Ritaprabha (Ratul) – guitar
- Saqi – vocal
- Abhirup Biswas – Guitar
- Subhajit Bhowmick – Bass

== Discography ==
Professional ratings
Review scores
Source	Rating
BengaliMusicOnline.com	4/5 stars

Tuccho

Studio album by Cactus
- Released: 2008
- Recorded: 2008
- Genre: Bengali rock
- Length: 26:00
- Label: Asha Audio
- Producer: Cactus

Cactus studio album chronology
Rajar Raja	''Tuccho''	Unknown

Cactus (1999) (Saregama India Limited)

Tracks

- "Shudhu Tumi Ele Na" (শুধু তুমি এলে না)
- "Amra Bhishon Eka" (আমরা ভীষণ একা)
- "Halogen" (হ্যালোজেন)
- "Tumio Bojho Amio Bujhi" (তুমিও বোঝো আমিও বুঝি)
- "Icchamoti" (ইছামতী)
- "Brishti Oooh Ma" (বৃষ্টি উঃ মা)
- "Bhoy" (ভয়)
- "Chai Shudhu Tomay" (চাই শুধু তোমায়)
- "Holud Pakhi" (হলুদ পাখি)

Nil Nirjane (2002) (Sunnyo Media Pvt. Ltd)

Tracks

- "Nil Nirjane" (নীল নির্জনে)
- "Noah" (নোয়া)
- "Telephone" (টেলিফোন)
- "Mon" (মন)
- "Dukho Medley (1st)" (দুঃখ মেডলি)
- "Medley (2nd)" (মেডলি)
- "Nil Nirjane – Music Track" (নীল নির্জনে – সংগীত)
- "Dialogue – Cactus and Raima" (সংলাপ – ক্যাকটাস ও রাইমা)

Rajar Raja (2004) (Asha Audio Company)

Tracks

- "Buddho Heshechhen" (বুদ্ধ হেসেছেন)
- "Udaaner Gaan" (উড়ানের গান)
- "Bodhu Re" (বধু রে)
- "Ude Jete Chay" (উড়ে যেতে চায়)
- "Lash Kata Ghore" (লাশ কাটা ঘরে)
- "Krishti" (কৃষ্টি)
- "Kamalar Swami" (কমলার স্বামী)
- "Rajar Raja" (রাজার রাজা)

Tuccho (2008) (Asha Audio Company)

Tracks

- "Bhalo Theko" (ভালো থেকো)
- "Kobi Dao – Kobita Hobo" (কবি দাও)
- "Moshiha" (মসীহা)
- "Phire Chawa" (ফিরে চাওয়া)
- "Pokhiraaj" (পক্ষীরাজ)
- "Raater Pori" (রাতের পরী)
- "Tuccho Ami" (তুচ্ছ আমি)
- "Shabdhane Raasta Perio" (সাবধানে রাস্তা পেরিয়ো)

Blah Blah Blah (2013) (Asha Audio Company)

Tracks

- "Blah Blah Blah"
- "Dulchhe"
- "Boro Deri"
- "Mon"
- "Status Update"
- "Noah"
- "Shohoj"
- "Nil Nirjone"

Tobuo Thik Acche (2017–2019) ( Asha Audio Company)

Tracks

- "Tobuo Thik Acche"
- "Jawler Dhaarey"
- "Nagorik Botaam"
- "Amra Ajo Naroke"
