= List of Indian music families =

Within the Indian music industry, there is a history of many members of a family over several generations all participating in the music industry. This page lists some of the more well-known such "clans". For Indian film families, see Lists of Indian film clans (For Hindi film families, see List of Hindi film clans).

== The Bhattacharya family ==
- Pashupati Bhattacharya (Vocalist and composer)
  - Kumar Sanu (Playback singer, producer and music director. Born Kedarnath Bhattacharjee, son of Pashupati Bhattacharya)
    - Shannon K (American singer-songwriter, daughter of Kumar Sanu)

== The Sajid–Wajid family ==
- Sajid–Wajid (cousins of singer Salma Agha and uncles of Sasha Agha)
  - Salma Agha (mother of Sasha Agha and cousin of Sajid-Wajid)
    - Sasha Agha (daughter of Salma Agha and niece of Sajid-Wajid)

== The Ganguly family ==
Though the Ganguly family is more well known for acting rather than singing, Kishore Kumar is a legend in Indian film music. His son, Amit Kumar is also a singer.

- Ashok Kumar
- Anoop Kumar
- Kishore Kumar
- Ruma Guha Thakurta (Kishore Kumar's first wife)
- Madhubala (Kishore Kumar's second wife)
- Yogita Bali (Kishore Kumar's third wife)
- Leena Chandavarkar (Kishore Kumar's fourth wife)
  - Preeti Ganguly (Ashok Kumar's daughter)
  - Deven Verma (Ashok Kumar's son-in-law via marriage to elder daughter Rupa Ganguly)
  - Amit Kumar (Kishore Kumar's son from his first wife)
    - Anuradha Patel (Ashok Kumar's granddaughter)
    - Kanwaljit Singh (Anuradha's husband)

== The Kumar family ==
Gulshan Kumar was the founder of the T-Series (Super Cassettes Industries Ltd.), the best-known music label in India, and an Indian Bollywood movie producer.

- Amit Kumar (singer, son of Kishore Kumar)
- Gulshan Kumar (founder of T-Series)
- Sudesh Kumari Dua (wife of Gulshan Kumar)
- Bhushan Kumar (son of Gulshan Kumar and present producer, chairman, and managing director of T-Series)
- Divya Khosla Kumar (actress, director, and wife of Bhushan Kumar)
- Krishan Kumar (actor, brother of Gulshan Kumar, nephew of Bhushan Kumar and another present producer of T-Series)
- Tanya Dua, (actress and wife of Krishan Kumar)
- Tulsi Kumar (Singer, Daughter of Gulshan Kumar)
- Khushali Kumar (Daughter of Gulshan Kumar and another singer)

== Ghantasala Family ==
- Ghantasala Sai Srinivas, widely known as S. Thaman, composer, multi-instrumentalist, conductor singer-songwriter, actor, and music producer.
- Ghantasala Balaramayya Grandfather to S. Thaman
- Ghantasala Siva Kumar, Composer and drummer, son of Ghantasala Balaramayya
- Ghantasala Savitri, Playback singer, wife of Ghantasala Siva Kumar, mother to S. Thaman
- Ghantasala Sri Vardhini, Playback singer, wife of S. Thaman
- B. Vasantha, Playback singer, Aunt of S. Thaman.

== The Lahiri family ==
- Bappi Lahiri (music director and singer)
  - Bappa Lahiri (music director. Son of Bappi Lahiri)

== The Mukesh-Mathur family ==
- Mukesh Chand Mathur (singer) + Sarla Trivedi Raichand
  - Rita Mukesh (daughter of Mukesh)
  - Nitin Mukesh (singer – son of Mukesh)
    - Neil Nitin Mukesh (actor – son of Nitin Mukesh and grandson of Mukesh) + Rukmini Sahay
      - Nurvi Neil Mukesh (daughter of Neil and great-granddaughter of Mukesh)
  - Nalini Mukesh (daughter of Mukesh)
  - Mohnish Mukesh (son of Mukesh)
  - Namrata (Amrita) Mukesh (daughter of Mukesh)
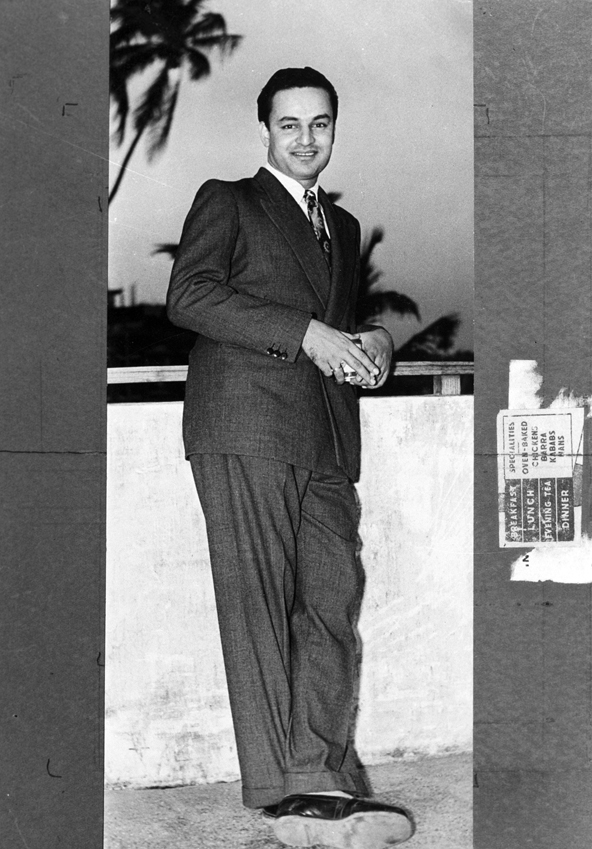
Mukesh

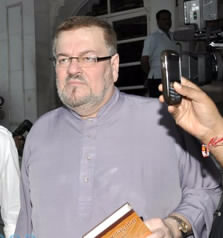
Nitin Mukesh

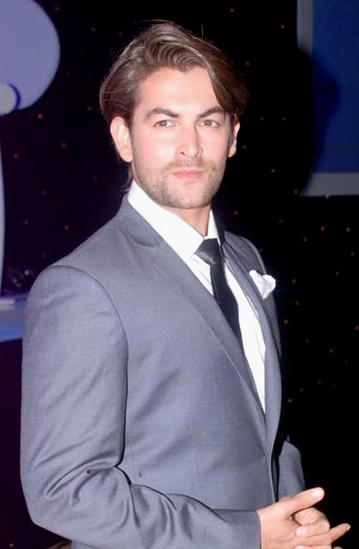
Neil Nitin Mukesh

== The Mangeshkar-Hardikar-Abhisheki and Burman extended family ==
- Ganesh Bhatt Navathe Hardikar (Abhisheki) + Yesubai Rane
  - Deenanath Mangeshkar (musician and theatre actor - son of Yesubai and Ganesh Bhatt Navathe Hardikar (Abhisheki))
    - Lata Mangeshkar (singer – eldest daughter of Deenanath Mangeshkar)
    - Hridaynath Mangeshkar (music composer and singer – son of Deenanath Mangeshkar)
    - Meena Khadikar (singer–daughter of Deenanath Mangeshkar)
    - Usha Mangeshkar (singer–daughter of Deenanath Mangeshkar)
    - Asha Bhosle (singer – daughter of Deenanath Mangeshkar) + Ganpatrao Bhosle (first husband of Asha Bhosle) and R. D. Burman (composer – second husband of Asha Bhosle and son of S. D. Burman, grandson of Nabadwipchandra Dev Burman, and great-grandson of Ishan Chandra Manikya)
      - Hemant Bhosle (son of Asha and Ganpatrao Bhosle)
      - Varsha Bhosle (daughter of Asha and Ganpatrao Bhosle)
      - Anand Bhosle (son of Asha and Ganpatrao Bhosle)
  - Balwantrao Abhisheki (vocalist - son of Ganesh Bhatt Navathe Hardikar (Abhisheki), Deenanath Mangeshkar's half-brother and student)
    - Jitendra Abhisheki (musician - son of Balwantrao Abhisheki, half-cousin to the Mangeshkar siblings)
      - Shounak Abhisheki (vocalist, composer and son of Jitendra Abhisheki)
  - Krishnarao Kolhapure (musician - son-in-law of Ganesh Bhatt Navathe Hardikar (Abhisheki), husband of Deenanath Mangeshkar and Balwantrao Abisheki's sister)
    - Pandharinath Kolhapure - musician – son of Krishnarao Kolhapure. His mother was half-sister of Deenanath Mangeshkar.
      - Padmini Kolhapure (actress – middle daughter of Pandharinath Kolhapure)
      - Tejaswini Kolhapure (actress – youngest daughter of Pandharinath Kolhapure)
      - Shivangi Kapoor (oldest daughter of Pandharinath Kolhapure) + Shakti Kapoor (actor – husband of Shivangi, elder sister of Padmini and Tejaswini)
        - Siddhanth Kapoor (actor – son of Shakti and Shivangi Kapoor)
        - Shraddha Kapoor (actress, singer, designer, lyricist – daughter of Shakti and Shivangi Kapoor)
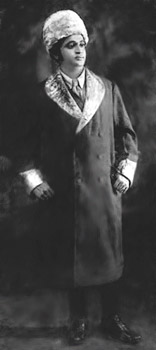
Deenanath Mangeshkar

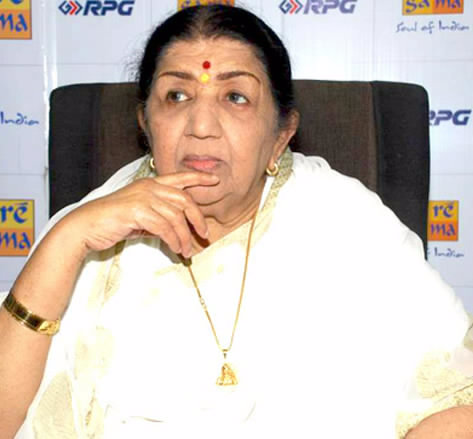
Lata Mangeshkar

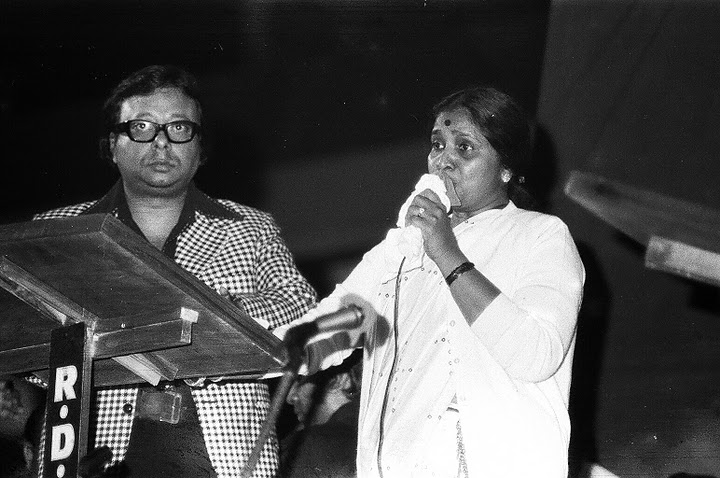
Asha Bhosle and R.D. Burman

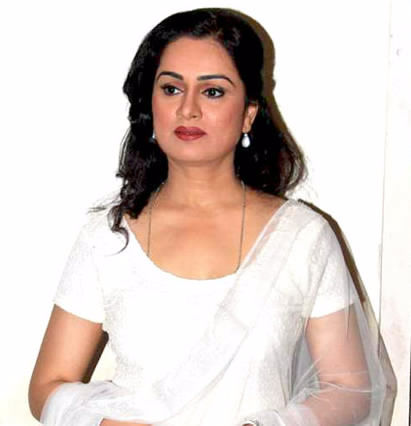
Padmini Kolhapure

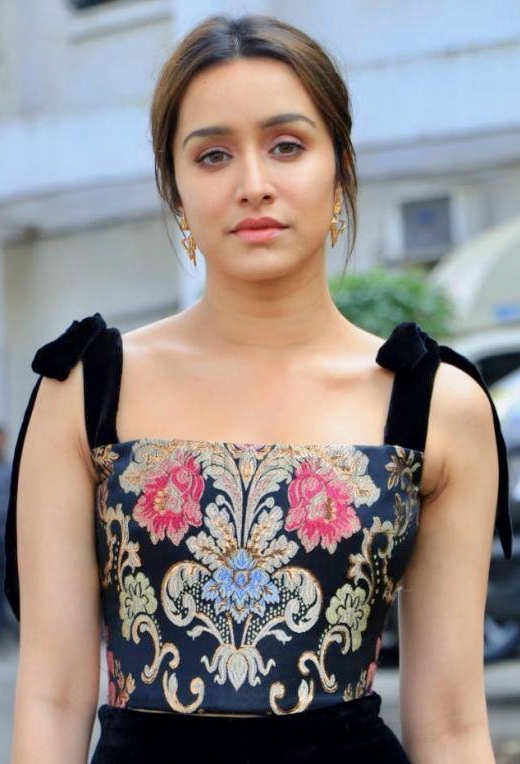
Shraddha Kapoor

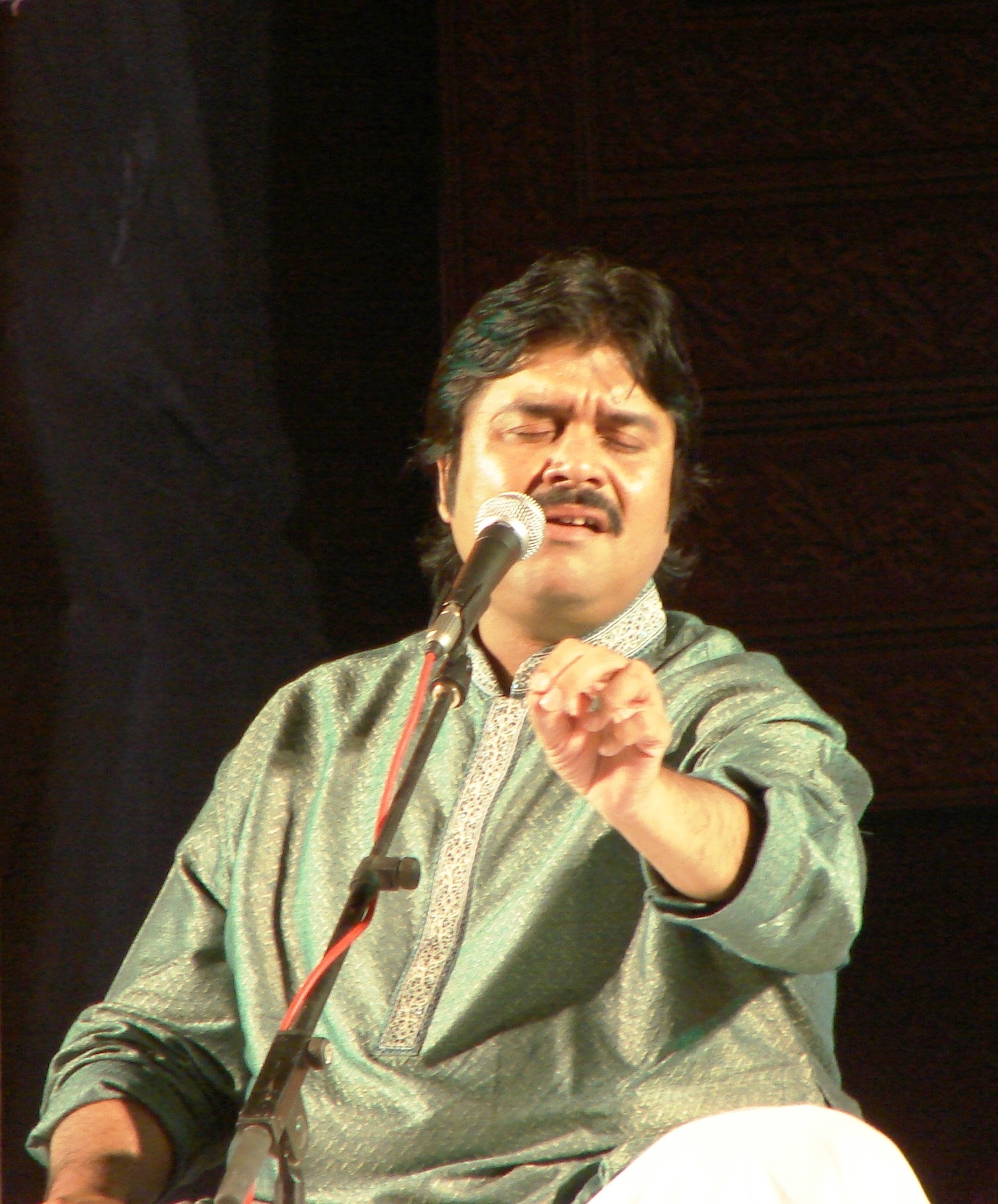
Shounak Abhisheki

== The Malik family ==
- Sardar Malik (Father of Anu Malik, Abu Malik & Daboo Malik)
  - Anu Malik (Brother of Daboo Malik)
    - Anmol Malik (Daughter of Anu Malik)
  - Daboo Malik (Brother of Anu Malik)
    - Amaal Malik (Son of Daboo Malik)
    - Armaan Malik (Son of Daboo Malik)
  - Abu Malik (Brother of Anu Malik)
- Aadar Malik (Son of Abu Malik)(Singer+Stand-up Comic)

== The Mukherjee family ==
- Jahar Mukherjee (Lyricist)
  - Manas Mukherjee (music director, Son of Jahar Mukherjee)
    - Shaan (Singer, Actor and TV presenter, Son of Manas Mukherjee)
    - Sagarika (Singer and Actress Daughter of Manas Mukherjee)

== The Narayan Jha family ==
Source: This family belongs to Nepal.

- Udit Narayan Jha (Singer)
- Deepa Narayan Jha (Singer, Wife of Udit Narayan)
  - Aditya Narayan Jha (Singer and TV presenter, Son of Udit Narayan)

== The Pandit family ==
- Jatin Pandit (Composer)
- Lalit Pandit (Composer. Younger brother of Jatin Pandit)
- Sulakshana Pandit (Playback singer and actress. Sister of Jatin and Lalit Pandit)
- Vijayta Pandit (Actress and playback singer. Sister of Jatin and Lalit Pandit)
- Aadesh Srivastav (Composer and singer. Husband of Vijayta Pandit
- Shweta Pandit (Singer. Niece of Jatin Pandit)
- Shraddha Pandit (Singer. Niece of Jatin Pandit)

== The R. K. Shekhar family ==
R. K. Shekhar was a prominent music composer who worked mainly in Malayalam movies. Shekhar served as a music conductor for over 100 films and composed scores for 52 films. He died in 1976 at a young age. Wife: Kasthuri Shekhar (later known as Kareema Begum), who died away in 2020. They had four children A. R. Rahman, A. R. Reihana, Fathima Rafiq and Ishrath Qadri.

- A. R. Rahman: A world-renowned music composer and singer.
- A. R. Reihana: A music composer and singer.
- Fathima Rafiq: the principal of KM Music Conservatory and managing musical projects.
- Ishrath Qadri: Deeply involved in the music industry, supporting musical projects and studios.

Grandchildren include:

- A. R. Ameen: Son of A. R. Rahman, singer is also involved in music production.
- Khatija Rahman: Daughter of A. R. Rahman, music composer and singer.
- G. V. Prakash Kumar: Son of A. R. Reihana, music composer and singer.
- Bhavani Sre: Daughter of A. R. Reihana, actress and singer.

It's clear that R. K. Shekhar's musical legacy has been carried forward by his children and grandchildren, making his family a significant contributor to Indian music industry.

== The Shankar family ==
Frequently quoted as India's first family of music, the Shankar family has been in the industry for nearly a century and produced a galaxy of dancers, singers, and stalwarts in various other art forms.

- Shyam Shankar Chowdhury (Impresario, introducing Indian dance and music to Britain. Patriarch of the Shankar family)
- Hemangini Devi (wife of Shyam Shankar Chowdhury)
  - Uday Shankar (Dancer and choreographer. Son of Shyam Shankar Chowdhury)
  - Amala Shankar (Danseuse. Wife of Uday Shankar)
    - Ananda Shankar (Musician best known for fusing Western and Eastern musical styles. Son of Uday and Amala Shankar)
    - Tanusree Shankar (one of the leading dancers and choreographers of contemporary dance in India. Wife of Ananda Shankar.)
      - Sreenanda Shankar (Dancer, actress, model, makeup and lifestyle influencer. Daughter of Tanusree and Ananda Shankar)
    - Mamata Shankar (Actress. Daughter of Uday Shankar and Amala Shankar)
      - Ratul Shankar (Percussionist and actor. Son of Mamata Shankar)
  - Ravi Shankar (Musician and composer. Son of Shyam Shankar Chowdhury)
  - Annapurna Devi (Surbahar player. Was married to Ravi Shankar)
    - Shubhendra Shankar (Musician and composer. Son of Ravi Shankar and Annapurna Devi)
  - Sukanya Shankar. Was married to Ravi Shankar)
    - Anoushka Shankar (Sitar player and composer. Daughter of Ravi Shankar)
    - Norah Jones (Singer-songwriter, pianist, and actress. Daughter of Ravi Shankar)
    - Joe Wright (Film director. Ex-husband of Anoushka Shankar)
  - Lakshmi Shankar (Hindustani classical vocalist. Sister-in-law of Ravi Shankar)
    - Viji Subramaniam (Singer and composer. Daughter of Lakshmi Shankar)
    - L. Subramaniam (Violinist, composer and conductor. Husband of Viji Shankar)
      - Gingger Shankar (Singer, composer and multi-instrumentalist. Granddaughter of Lakshmi Shankar)
      - Ambi Subramaniam (Violinist, pianist and singer. Grandson of Lakshmi Shankar)
      - Bindu Subramaniam (Singer-songwriter and pianist. Granddaughter of Lakshmi Shankar)
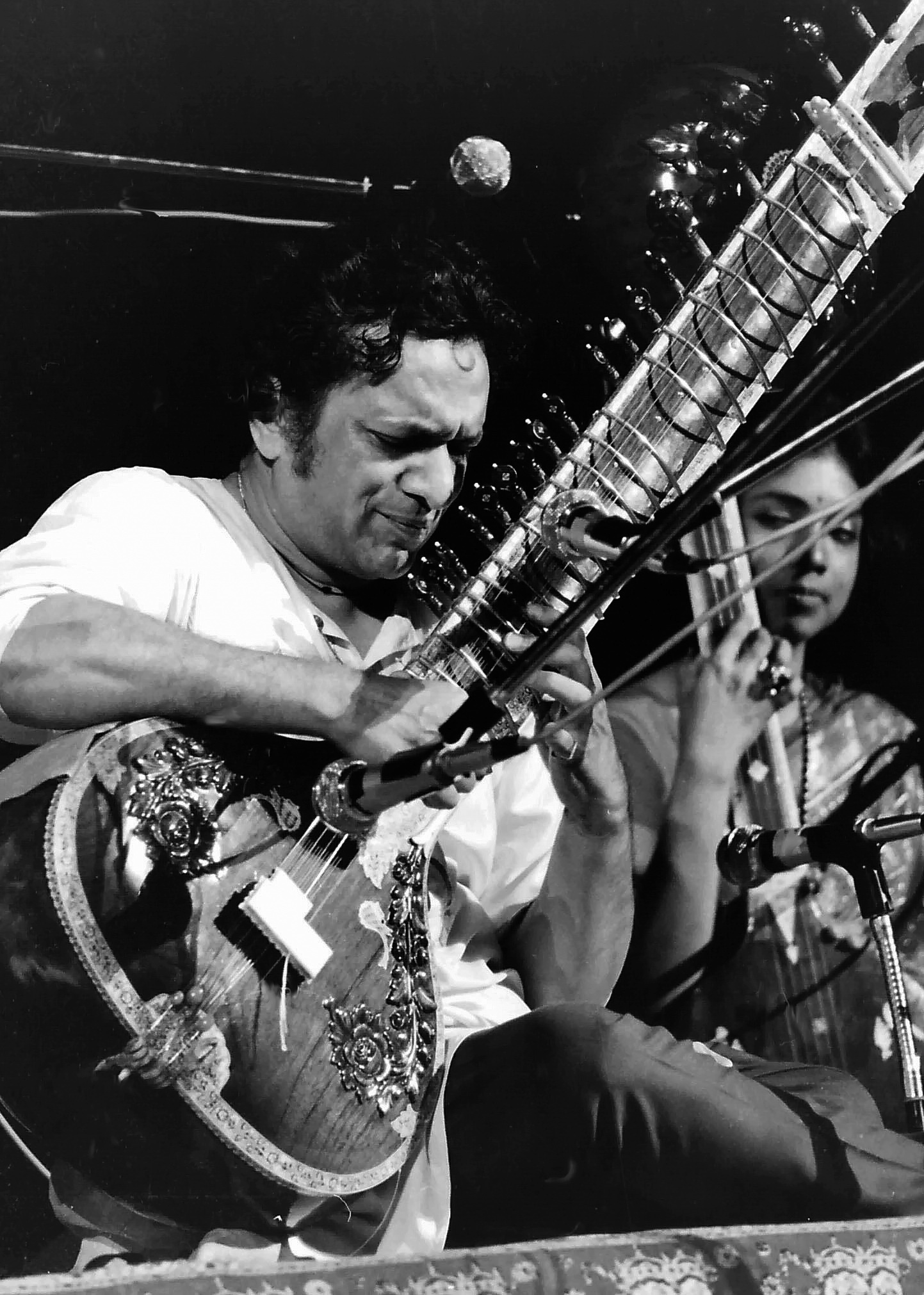
Ravi Shankar

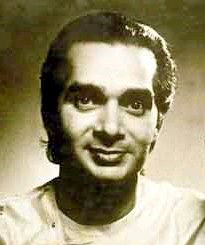
Uday Shankar

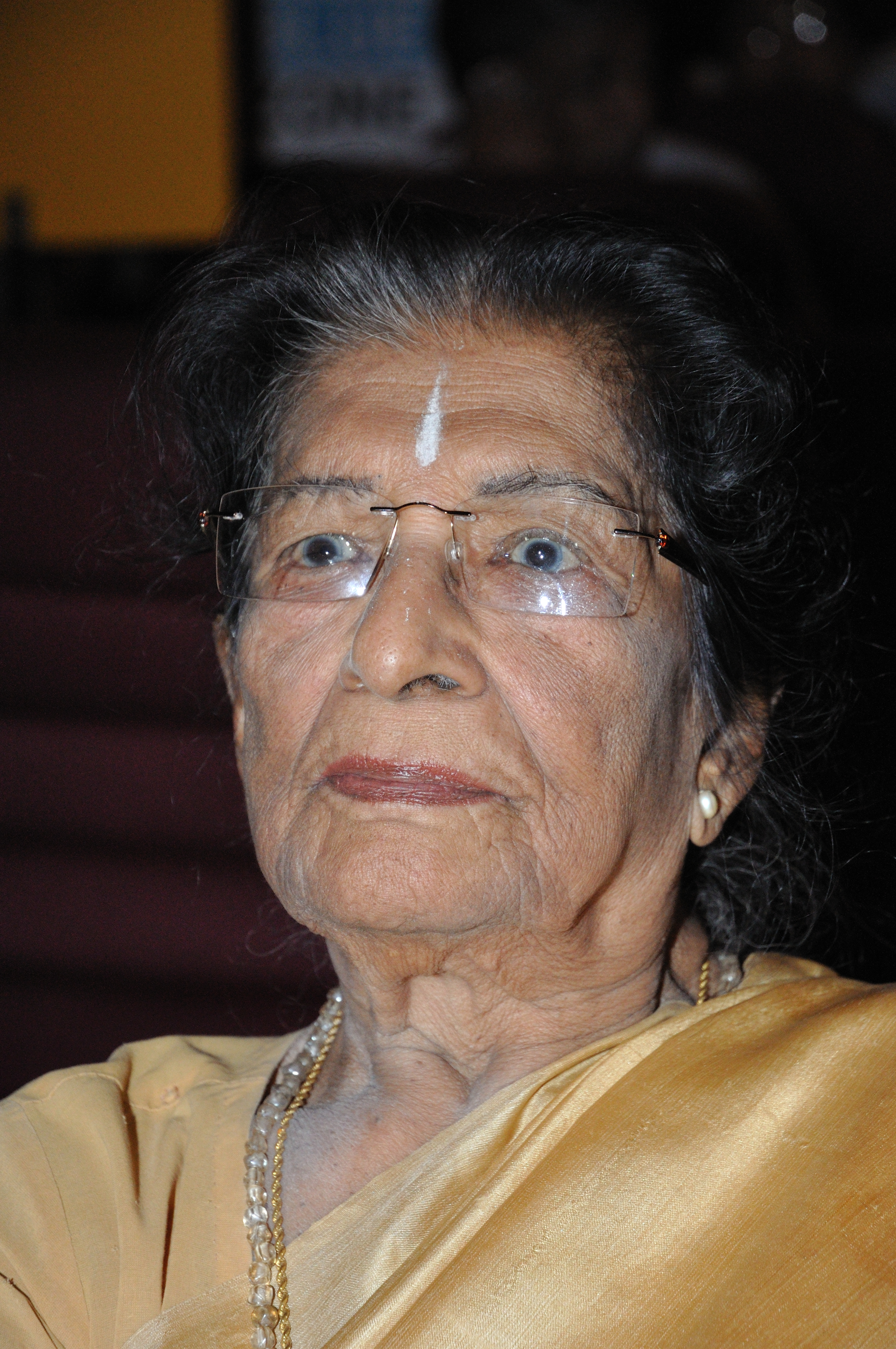
Amala Shankar

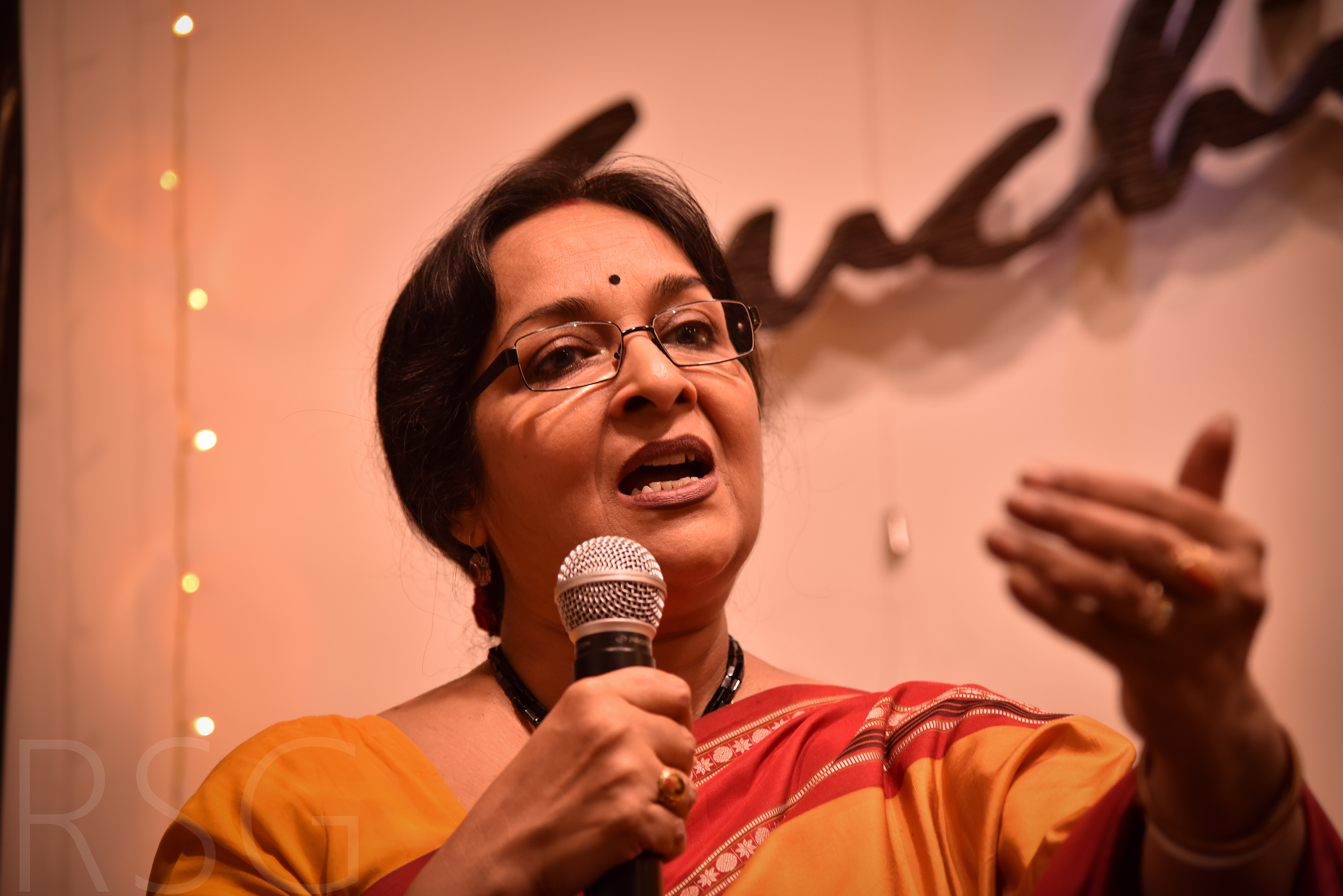
Mamata Shankar

Tanusree Shankar

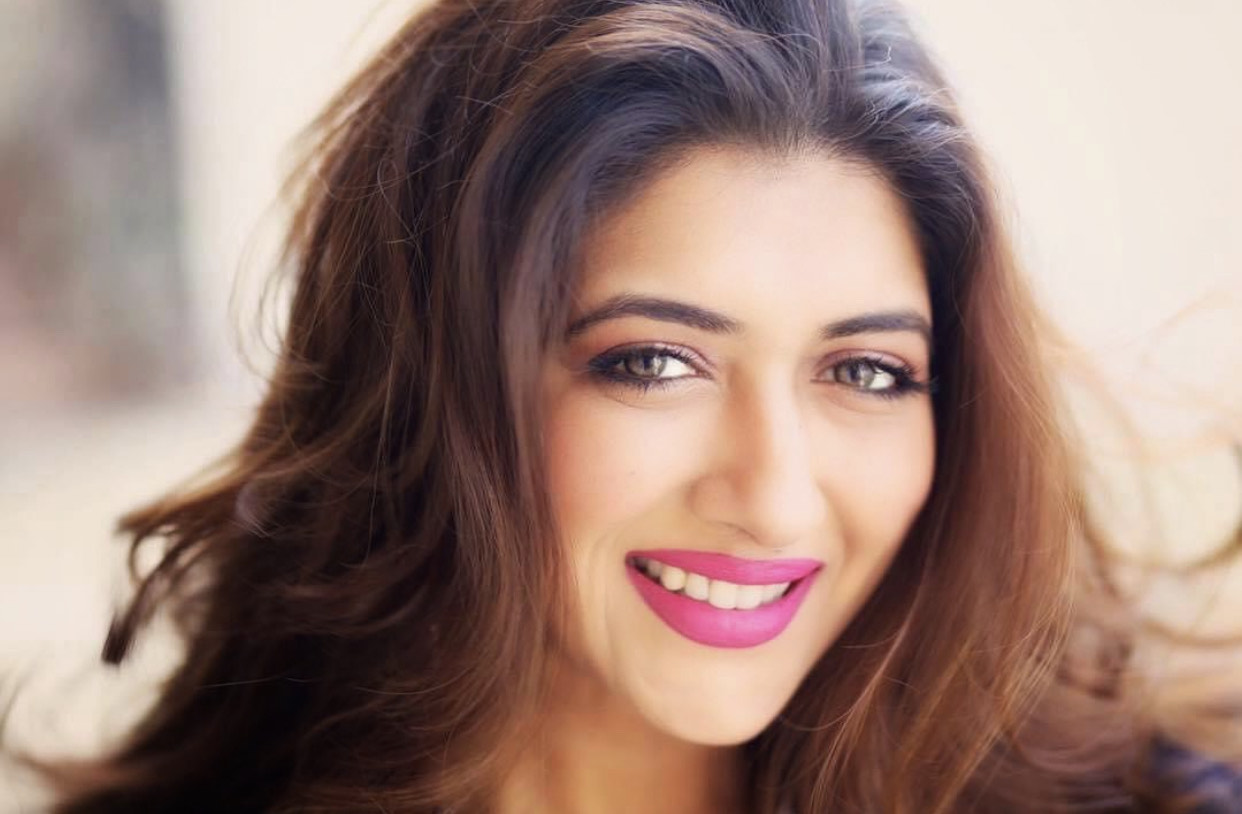
Sreenanda Shankar

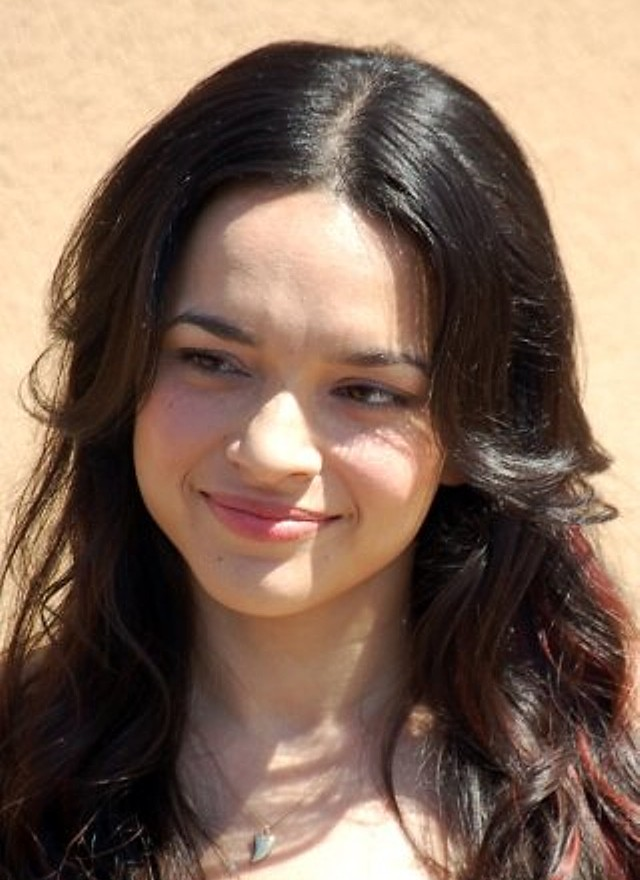
Norah Jones

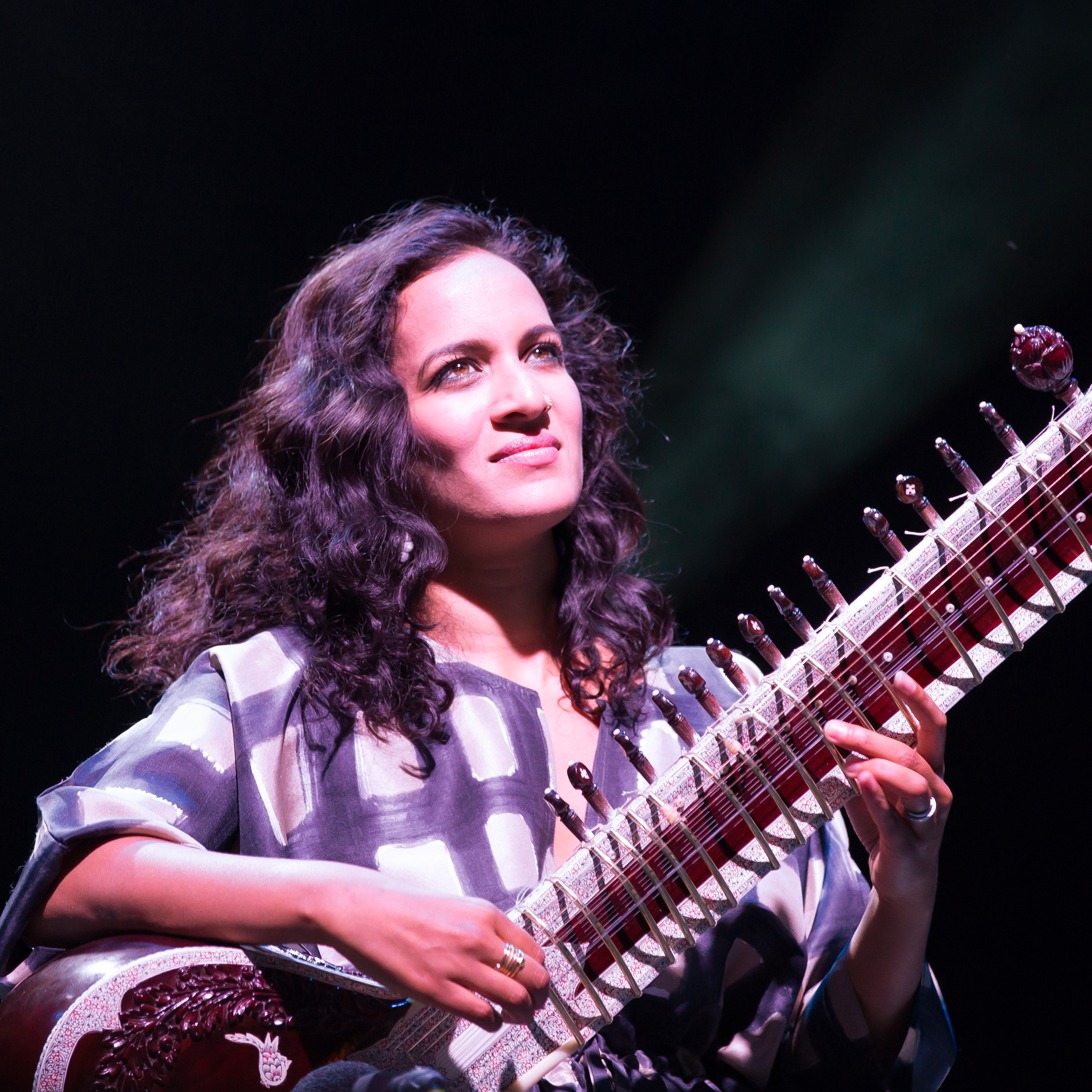
Anoushka Shankar

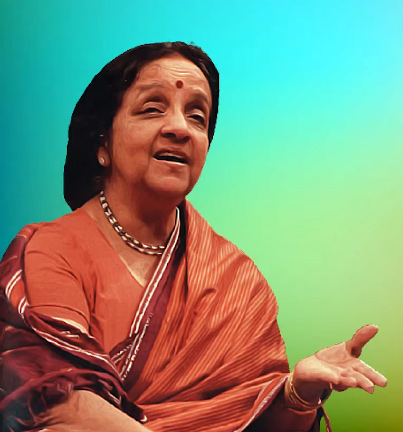
Lakshmi Shankar

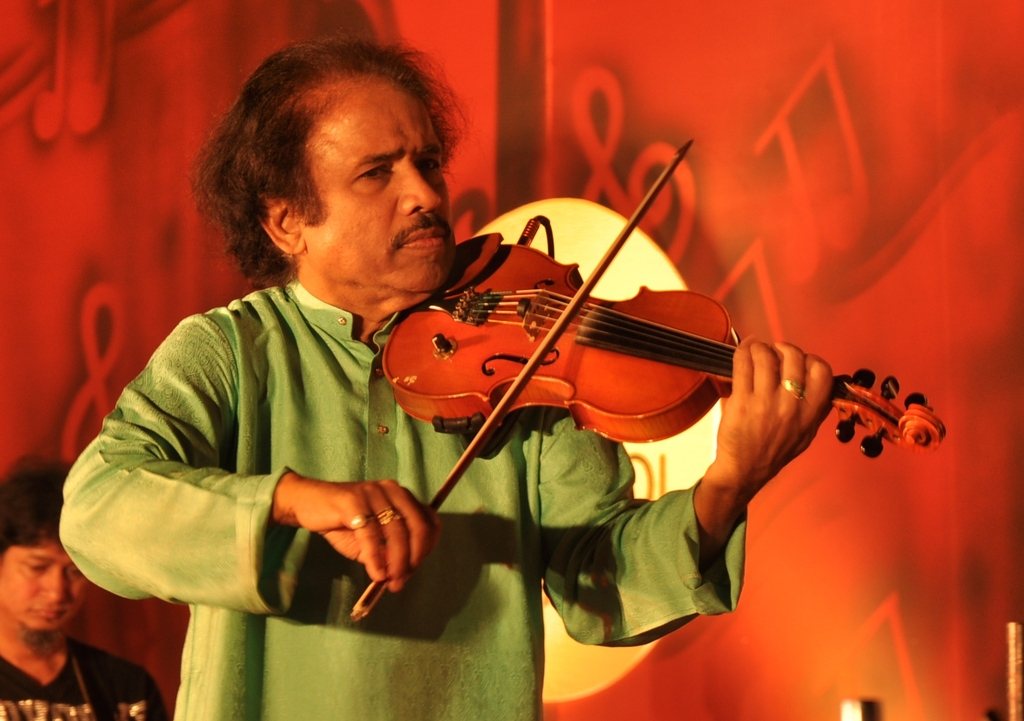
L. Subramaniam

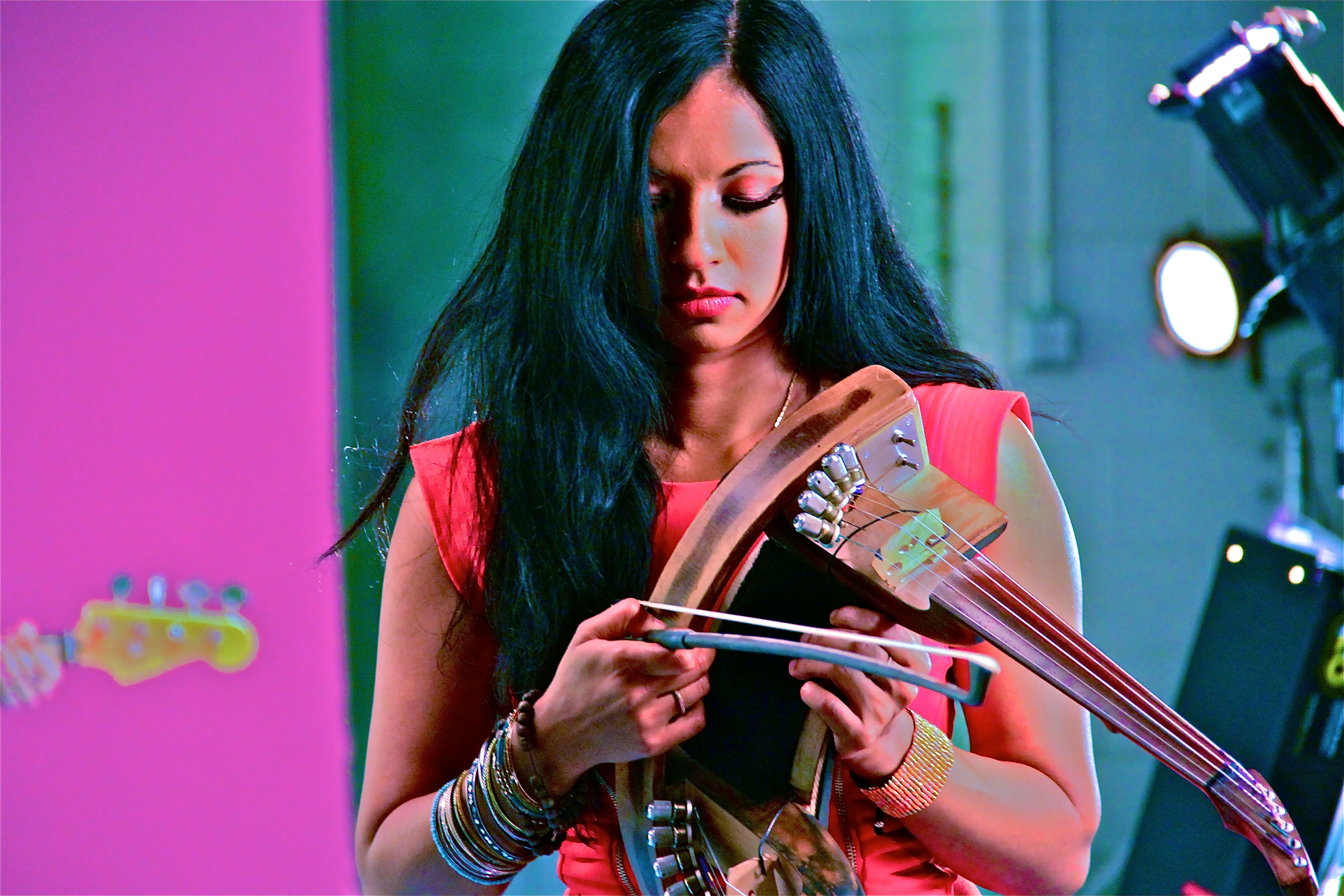
Gingger Shankar

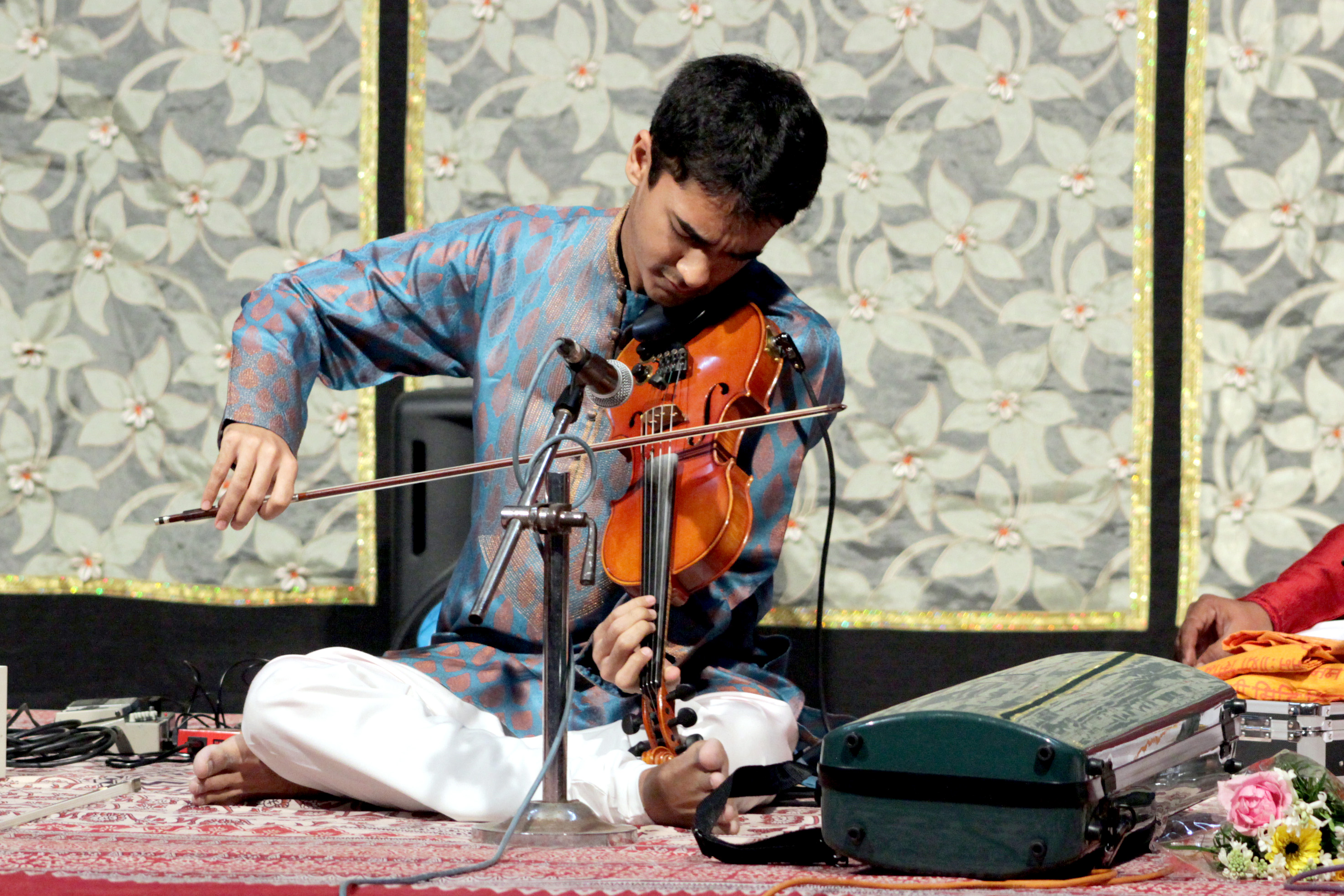
Ambi Subramaniam

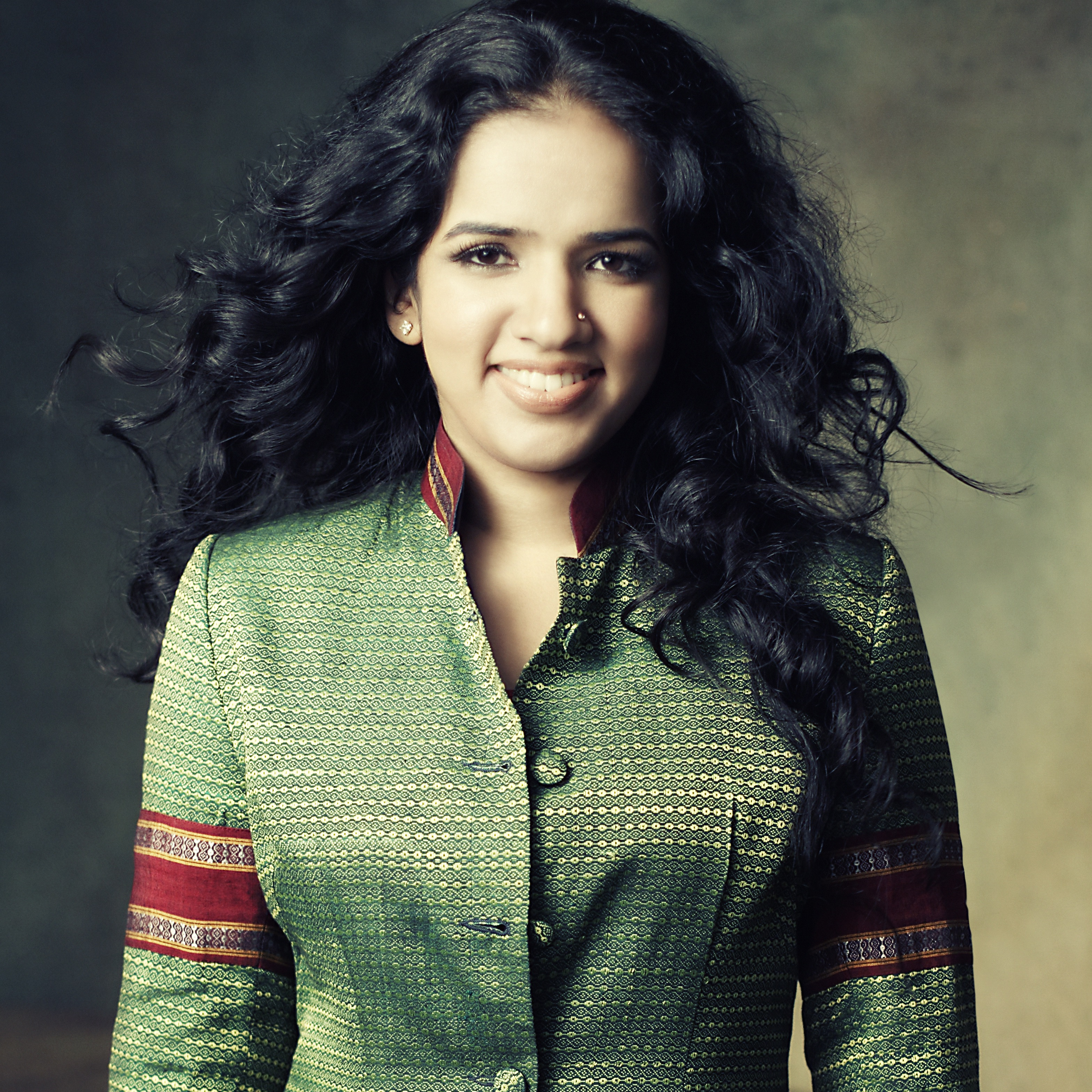
Bindu Subramaniam

== The S. P. Family ==
- S. P. Balasubrahmanyam, playback singer, composer, conductor singer-songwriter, actor, and music producer.
- S. P. B. Charan, playback singer; son of S. P. Balasubrahmanyam.
- S. P. Sailaja, playback singer; sister of S. P. Balasubrahmanyam.

== The Saluri family ==
- S. Rajeswara Rao, composer, multi instrumentalist, conductor singer-songwriter, actor, and music producer.
- Saluri Koteswara Rao, widely known as Koti, composer, multi-instrumentalist, conductor singer-songwriter, actor, and music producer, son of S. Rajeswara Rao.
- Roshan Saluri, composer, singer-songwriter, actor, and son of Saluri Koteswara Rao.

== The Susarla family ==
- Susarla Dakshinamurthi Sastry Sr. composer, multi instrumentalist, conductor singer-songwriter, and music producer.
- Susarla Krishna Brahma Sastry composer, multi instrumentalist, conductor singer-songwriter, and music producer, son of Susarla Dakshinamurthi Sr.
- Susarla Dakshinamurthi Sastry Jr. composer, multi-instrumentalist, conductor singer-songwriter, and music producer, son of Susarla Krishna Brahma Sastry.

== The Thotakura family ==
- T. V. Raju composer, multi instrumentalist, conductor singer-songwriter, actor, and music producer.
- Thotakura Somaraju widely known as Raj–Koti, composer, multi-instrumentalist, conductor singer-songwriter, actor, and music producer, son of T. V. Raju.

== See also ==
- Hindi cinema content lists
