= Pinjar =

Pinjar may refer to:

- Pinjar, Western Australia, suburb of Perth, Western Australia
- Pinjar (novel), 1950 Punjabi-language novel by Indian writer Amrita Pritam about the partition of India
  - Pinjar (2003 film), Indian drama film adaptation by Chandraprakash Dwivedi
- Pinjar (2026 film), an Indian Bengali-language social drama film

== See also ==
- Pinjra (disambiguation)
