= Sreenanda Shankar =

Indian actress, model and dancer

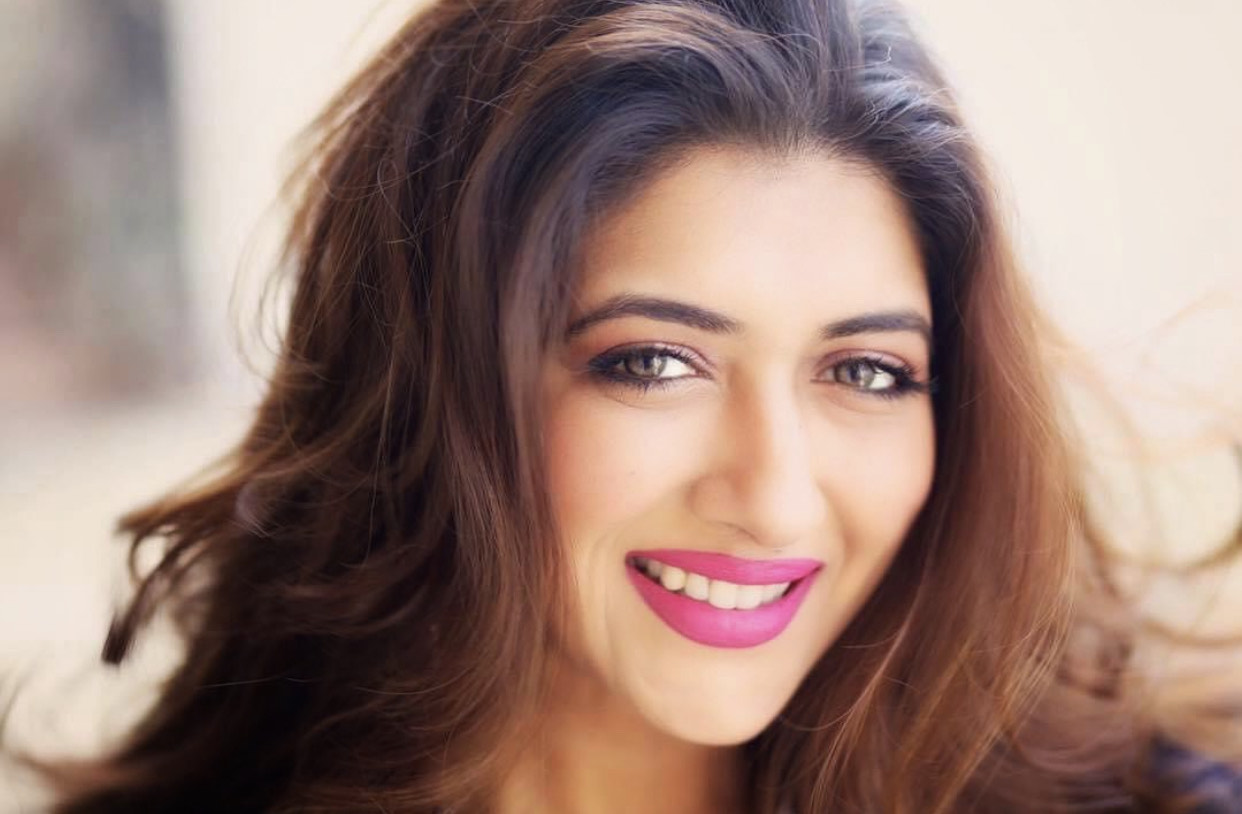
- Born: 25 December 1980 (age 45); Kolkata, West Bengal, India
- Education: The Ailey School; Roshan Taneja School of Acting; Lee Strasberg Theatre and Film Institute
- Occupations: Actress, Model & Dancer
- Spouse: Gev Satarawalla (m. 2009; sep. 2025)
- Parents: Ananda Shankar (father); Tanusree Shankar (mother)
- Website: sreenandashankar.com

Sreenanda Shankar (born 25 December 1980) is an Indian actress, model and dancer.

== Early life and education ==
Sreenanda was born in Kolkata, India to Ananda Shankar; the Indian musician, and Tanusree Shankar; a dancer and choreographer. Her name is a portmanteau of the names of her parents. She is the granddaughter of Indian dancer and choreographer, Uday Shankar and his wife Amala Shankar. The Indian sitarist and composer, Ravi Shankar is her granduncle. Sreenanda started acting and dancing at a very young age having accompanied her parents on music recordings, dance tours and performances.

Sreenanda was trained at the Tanusree Shankar Dance Academy and studied at The Ailey School, the American dance training Theatre. She also studied acting as a course at Roshan Taneja School of Acting in Mumbai, India and at the Lee Strasberg Theatre and Film Institute in New York.

== Career ==
Sreenanda performed as a dancer on stage across India, as well as in USA, UK, Spain and other nations. She performed on television for multiple dance-dramas where she played the role of Goddess Durga.

As a model, Sreenanda has featured in TV/video commercials and ad campaigns on multiple occasions. She has starred as an actress in movies directed by notable film directors such as Aparna Sen, Suman Ghosh and Srijit Mukherji.

Sreenanda is the founder of Makeover Madness. It's about what suits You, an online makeup platform for women. She is also the director at Tanusree Shankar Dance Company.

She has a youtube channel where she shows her makeup tutorials and daily lifestyle.

== Personal life ==
Sreenanda married her longtime boyfriend Gev Satarawalla in November 2009.They announced their separation in December 2025.

== Filmography ==
=== Feature films ===
Year	Production
2018	Ek Je Chhilo Raja
2019	Basu Poribar
2019	Ghawre Bairey Aaj

=== Short films ===
Year	Production
2015	The Third Eye
2017	Talking of Michelangelo
