= Pinjra =

Pinjra may refer to:

- Pinjara, a social community of India
- Ghanchi-Pinjara, a Muslim community of Gujarat, India
- Pinjra (film), 1972 Indian Marathi-language drama film by V. Shantaram, starring Sandhya and Shriram Lagoo; winner of the National Film Award for Best Feature Film in Marathi
- Pinjara (TV series), 2011 Indian Marathi-language drama TV series starring Sanskruti Balgude
- Pinjra (2017 TV series), a Pakistani television series on A-Plus TV
- Pinjra (2022 TV series), a Pakistani television series on ARY Digital

== See also ==
- Pinjar (disambiguation)
