= Ratul Shankar =

Indian percussionist and actor

- Born: 30 July 1979 (age 47); Calcutta (now Kolkata)
- Occupations: Percussionist, actor
- Parent(s): Mamata Shankar (mother); Chandrodoy Ghosh (father)
- Relatives: Uday Shankar (grandfather); Ravi Shankar (granduncle)

Ratul Shankar (born Ratul Shankar Ghosh) is a percussionist and actor.

== Family background ==
Ratul Shankar is the great-grandson of Shyam Shankar Chowdhury, grandson of Uday Shankar, grandnephew of renowned sitarist Ravi Shankar, and son of Mamata Shankar. He is the nephew of Ananda Shankar, sitar player Anoushka Shankar, and western singer Norah Jones.

Born in the Shankar family on 30 July 1979, Ratul was exposed to the various forms of performing arts at a very young age. He has been touring with his parents Mamata Shankar and Chandrodoy Ghosh from the age of two.

Trained under Pt. Tanmoy Bose, Ratul has performed in his World Music Project "TAAL TANTRA" and has been performing with the project for the last 13 years. He has also been a feature of various other World Music projects.

A Major in Mass Communication and Videography from St. Xavier's College, Kolkata, Shankar made his debut in acting with Rituporno Ghosh in the National Award winning film Utsab in 2000.

Shankar has cited his uncle Ananda Shankar as his greatest musical influence. While performing with "TAAL TANTRA" and other various projects, Ratul performed with the maestros such as Ustad Amjad Ali Khan, Ustad Taufique Quereshi, Selvaganesh, Pt. Tejendra Narayan Majumdar, Pt. Bickram Ghosh, Pete Lockett, Tilmann Dienhart, Niladri Kumar, Carl Peters, Ranajit Sengupta, Wolfgang Netzer, Soweto Kinch, Jesse Bannister, and Attab Hadad.

Shankar has been touring extensively with various projects scattered over the world. His main interest lies in collaborating with musicians from all over and believes in the Cultural Exchange that takes place fluently.

== As an actor ==
Ratul has acted in Anuranan and Rituparno Ghosh's Utsab
