= Bettina Bäumer =

Austrian-born Indian scholar (born 1940)

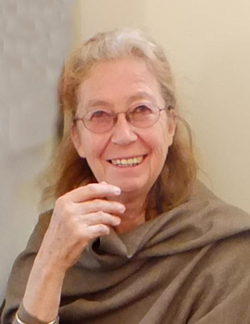
- Born: Bettina Bäumer; 12 April 1940 (age 86); Salzburg, Austria
- Other name: Bettina Sharada Bäumer
- Citizenship: Austria (1940–2011); India (2011–present)
- Occupation: Indologist
- Awards: Austrian Decoration for Science and Art (2012); Padma Shri (2015); Ulrich Winkler Award (2023)

Education
- Education: University of Salzburg; LMU Munich (Ph.D.)

Philosophical work
- Main interests: Kashmir Shaivism
- Website: www.utpaladeva.in

Bettina Sharada Bäumer (born 12 April 1940) is an Austrian-born Indian scholar of religion. Bäumer has been described by Vandana Parthasarathy, writing in The Hindu, as a "renowned Indologist, one of the foremost expounders of Kashmir Saivism and a well-known figure in the field of interreligious dialogue". She was awarded the Austrian Decoration for Science and Art by Government of Austria in 2012 and Padma Shri by Government of India in 2015 for her contribution to Literature and Education. She was awarded the Ulrich Winkler Award for Comparative Theology and Study of Religions in 2023.

== Early life and education ==
She was born in Salzburg on 12 April 1940 to Prof. Eduard Bäumer and Valerie Bäumer and secured her High School Leaving Certificate (Matura) in Salzburg in 1959. She pursued higher studies in Philosophy, Religion, Theology and Music at the University of Salzburg, the University of Vienna, the University of Zurich, Sapienza University of Rome, and LMU Munich between 1959 and 1967. Her Ph.D. thesis Creation as Play: The concept of Lila in Hinduism, its Philosophical and Theological Significance was presented at LMU Munich where she secured her doctorate of philosophy in 1967. Bäumer took the Indian name "Sharada" while applying for citizenship, and became an Indian citizen in 2011.

== Career ==
She completed her habilitation in 1997 at the Institute for Religious Studies of the Faculty of Catholic Theology at the University of Vienna. In 2002, she became the first woman to receive an honorary doctorate from the Faculty of Theology at the University of Salzburg.

She has lived in India for over four decades, having found "belonging in Hinduism" and is quoted as emphasising that; "getting to know another religion does not permit using it as a quarry to be mined" She conducted post-doctoral research in Indian philosophy and Sanskrit at Banaras Hindu University (Varanasi), where she worked as an assistant and lecturer, under a reciprocal scholarship from the government of India. She has done field work in Odisha.

She worked in the University of Vienna (Indology) and as director of the Research of the Alice Bonner Foundation for Fundamental Research in Indian Art and has been a visiting professor at the University of Vienna, the University of Salzburg and the University of Berne. She has been honorary coordinator of the Kalatattvakosa programme, and editor of Kalatattvakosa: a Lexicon of Fundamental Concepts of the Indian Arts, respectively conducted and published by the Indira Gandhi National Centre for the Arts. She has been a fellow at Harvard University and at the Indian Institute of Advanced Study, Shimla. In 2009, she was director of Samvidalaya at the Abhinavagupta Research Library, Varanasi. She was the co-chairperson of the fifteenth World Sanskrit Conference, held in New Delhi in 2012.

== Abhinavagupta's hermeneutics ==
Surekha Dhaleta, in an article in the Times of India, described her as passionate about Kashmir Shaivism, as manifest in the commentaries of its leading commentator Abhinavagupta. She quotes Dr. Bäumer thus; "There is a lot of misrepresentation and misunderstanding about tantra, which forms the core of Kashmir Shaivism and has been generally misunderstood as black magic or witchcraft. Tantra is fascinating and is very rich and beautiful and related to practical life. It speaks about cosmic energies. The book Abhinavagupta's Hermeneutics of the Absolute: Annutraprakriya, an interpretation of his Paratrisika Vivarana aims to present tantra and its interpretation in a scholarly way. I would appeal to youngsters to not see Hindu philosophy with dry speculation as it is very rich in knowledge and a great repository of traditions". The book provides extensive translations, commentary and in-depth interpretation of Abhinavgupta's theories.
