= Pinjar (2025 film) =

2025 Bengali-language drama film

- পিঞ্জর
- Directed by: Rudrajit Roy
- Screenplay by: Rahul Roye
- Produced by: Animesh Ganguly (Bell Jar Films); Chasing Dreams Films
- Starring: Sagnik Mukherjee Swastidipa Rabidas; Satakshi Nandy; Ishan Mazumder; Mallika Banerjee Roy; Joy Sengupta; Mamata Shankar; Samiul Alam; Tathagata Mukherjee
- Cinematography: Manas Bhattacharyya
- Music by: Ratul Shankar
- Production company: Chasing Dreams Films Bell Jar Films
- Release dates: 4 September 2025 (Chicago South Asian Film Festival); 10 July 2026
- Country: India
- Language: Bengali

Pinjar (Bengali: পিঞ্জর; lit. 'cage') is a 2025 Indian Bengali-language social drama film directed by physician-filmmaker Rudrajit Roy in his feature-film directorial debut. The screenplay was written by Rahul Roye, and the film was produced by Chasing Dreams Films in association with Animesh Ganguly's Film Production house Bell Jar Films.

Featuring an ensemble cast led by Sagnik Mukherjee, Swastidipa Rabidas, Satakshi Nandy, Ishan Mazumder and Mallika Banerjee Roy, the film follows five people experiencing different forms of social, economic and emotional confinement. Their stories are connected through the recurring image of a captured wild bird.

Before its theatrical release, Pinjar was shown at several international film festivals, including the Chicago South Asian Film Festival, the Asian Film Festival Barcelona, the Kolkata International Film Festival and the London Bengali Film Festival. The film was theatrically released in India on 10 July 2026.

== Plot ==
Tarak is a bird-catcher who earns his living by trapping wild birds, although poverty and circumstance have left him unable to escape the restrictions of his own life. His daughter Jhimli grows up in an environment where poverty and gender expectations increasingly limit her future.

Their lives are interwoven with those of Paromita, a widowed teacher living with loneliness; Iqbal, a Muslim migrant who experiences discrimination and social alienation in the city; and Shefali, a working woman who conceals the abuse she experiences within her marriage. A captured wild bird passes through their different worlds and functions as a metaphor for their shared desire for freedom.

== Cast ==
- Sagnik Mukherjee as Tarak, a bird-catcher
- Swastidipa Rabidas as Jhimli, Tarak's daughter
- Satakshi Nandy as Paromita, a widowed teacher
- Ishan Mazumder as Iqbal, a Muslim migrant
- Mallika Banerjee Roy as Shefali, a woman in an abusive marriage
- Joy Sengupta
- Mamata Shankar in a special appearance
- Samiul Alam
- Tathagata Mukherjee

== Soundtrack ==
Bengali film Pinjar's Music rights is acquired by 'Pluto Music' Label.

List of Songs of the Bengali film 'Pinjar (2026)'
Song Name	Music Composer	Lyricist	Singer
Mayar Pinjar (Title Track)	Ratul Shankar, Premangshu Das	Premangshu Das	Premangshu Das
Anondoloke	Rabindranath Tagore	Rabindranath Tagore	Premangshu Das
Aaj Shokal	Ratul Shankar	Ambarish Majumdar	Ujjaini Mukherjee
Monero Gobhire	Soumya Rit	Soumya Rit	Manomay Bhattacharya

== Production ==
Pinjar marked the feature-film directorial debut of Rudrajit Roy, a Kolkata-based physician and independent filmmaker. Rahul Roye wrote the screenplay, Manas Bhattacharyya served as the cinematographer, and Ratul Shankar composed the background score and music.

According to Sangbad Pratidin, the film took approximately a year and a half to complete, with Roy involved in casting and other aspects of pre-production. The narrative was structured around five characters from rural and urban Bengal, using bird-catching and the imagery of cages to connect literal captivity with patriarchal restrictions, poverty, religious prejudice, domestic violence and emotional isolation.

The film's depiction of illegal bird-catching was developed following approximately two years of research and engagement with rural experiences.

== Festival screenings and release ==
The film had its world premiere at the 16th Chicago South Asian Film Festival, where it was screened on 14 September 2025. It was subsequently screened in the Discoveries section of the Asian Film Festival Barcelona on 3 November 2025.

Pinjar had its Indian premiere in the Bengali Panorama section of the 31st Kolkata International Film Festival. Coverage of the screening described the film's central analogy between captured birds and people confined by prejudice, superstition and social structures.

The film also received a United Kingdom premiere at the ninth London Bengali Film Festival in April 2026. Other reported festival screenings included the Indian Film Festival of Sydney, the International Indian Film Festival Toronto, the South Asian Film Festival of Montreal and Haapifest.

In June 2026, Singapore-based company Hazelnut Media acquired the film's international rights. The company also announced an impact initiative connected with girls' education in rural West Bengal.

The film was released in Bengali-language theatres in India on 10 July 2026.

== Reception ==
Eshna Bhattacharya of The Times of India gave the film three out of five stars. She praised Roy's restrained direction, the performances of Sagnik Mukherjee and Swastidipa Rabidas, Manas Bhattacharyya's cinematography and Ratul Shankar's score. She found that some of the film's narrative strands were less fully developed than others and wrote that its deliberate pacing might not appeal to all viewers.

Writing for The Telegraph, Agnivo Niyogi described the film as an understated exploration of captivity and praised its ensemble performances, realistic depiction of rural Bengal, background score and use of birdsong and silence. He identified the uneven balance between the multiple storylines and the need for tighter editing as weaknesses.

Subhadrika Sen of Indulg Express said "Rudrajit Roy's Bengali film Pinjar depicts everyday characters navigating societal constraints, exploring the metaphor of a cage and the characters' eventual push against these limitations"

A review published by Sangbad Pratidin praised the film's straightforward storytelling and the performances of Sagnik Mukherjee, Mallika Banerjee Roy, Satakshi Nandy, Ishan Mazumder and Swastidipa Rabidas. The review also commended Manas Bhattacharyya's cinematography and Ratul Shankar's music, while finding that the film could have been shorter and that its middle portion occasionally became monotonous.

== Accolades ==
Year	Award or festival	Category	Recipient	Result	Ref.
2026	22nd Third Eye Asian Film Festival	Best Director – Special Jury Mention in Indian Cinema Competition	Rudrajit Roy	Won	

== Development and themes ==
Roy traced the initial idea for Pinjar to the image of a captured bird, which he subsequently developed into a broader narrative about social, psychological and emotional confinement. In an interview with The Indian Express Bangla, he discussed the development of his debut feature, including its conception and the selection of its cast and crew.

The film addresses several forms of confinement, including economic hardship, domestic abuse, gender restrictions and religious discrimination. A report in The Times of India noted that one storyline examines the difficulty faced by Muslims seeking rented accommodation in Kolkata, while the rural storyline incorporates the illegal trapping and sale of wild birds.

Roy, who worked as a physician before directing his first feature, described the difficulties he encountered while entering the Bengali film industry in an interview published by Anandabazar Patrika shortly before the film's theatrical release.

Satakshi Nandy plays Paromita, a young widowed schoolteacher whose personal desires are restricted by social expectations. Nandy related aspects of the character to her observations of the subtle restrictions that widowed women continue to experience.

== Festival screenings ==
Following its Chicago premiere, Pinjar was screened at the Indian Film Festival of Sydney and was presented as a centrepiece film at the International Indian Film Festival Toronto.

The film was selected for the Indian Cinema Competition at the 22nd Third Eye Asian Film Festival. Roy subsequently received a Special Jury Mention for Best Director in the competition.

In April 2026, the film received its United Kingdom premiere at the London Bengali Film Festival, where it was screened at BLOC Cinema, Queen Mary University of London. It was subsequently selected for the South Asian Film Festival of Montreal.

== Critical response ==
An additional review published by Aajkaal following the film's Kolkata International Film Festival screening praised its interwoven depiction of rural and urban lives, symbolic treatment of confinement, use of music and performances. The review particularly discussed the work of Sagnik Mukherjee, Satakshi Nandy, Mallika Banerjee Roy and Ishan Mazumder.
