= Alice Boner =

Swiss artist and indologist (1889–1981)

- Born: 22 July 1889; Legnano, Italy
- Died: 13 April 1981 (aged 91); Zurich, Switzerland
- Known for: painting, sculpture, drawing
- Awards: 1969 Honorary Doctor, University of Zürich; 1974 Padma Bhushan

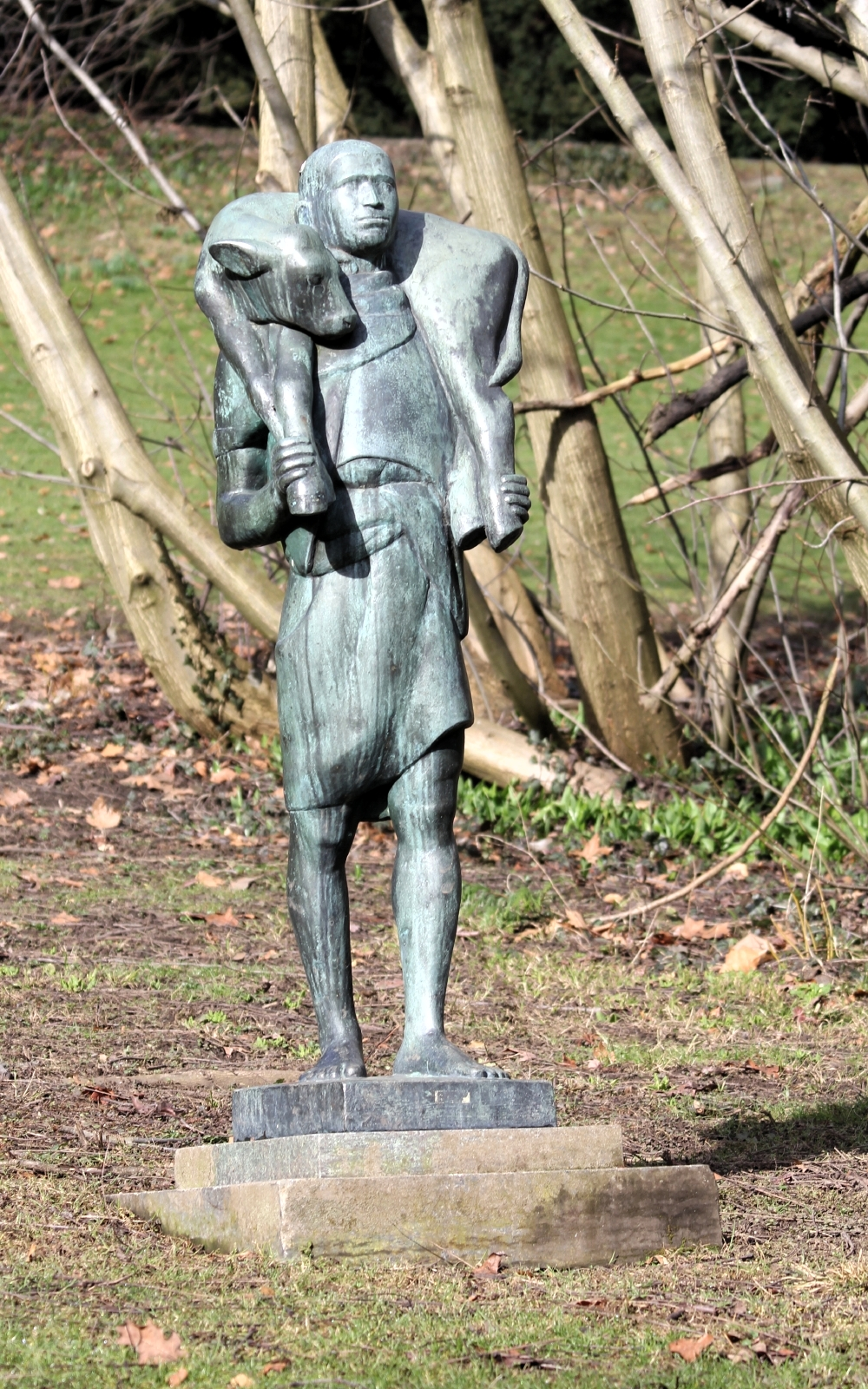
Shepherd Bronze by Alice Boner, in Rieterpark Zurich

Alice Boner (22 July 1889 – 13 April 1981) was a Swiss painter and sculptor, art historian, and an Indologist.

In her drawings she used pencil, charcoal, sepia, red chalk, ink, and sometimes pastel. Her early works focused on drawings, sculptures, portrait, full body studies, landscapes and nature observations. The artist also harbored a great fascination for the art of dance and created motion studies of the three dancers Lilly, Jeanne, and Leonie Brown as well as the Indian dancer Uday Shankar. Her sketches were spontaneous, a series of observations, that are usually performed only with a few quick strokes, and are focused on the essential characteristics of the body. The collection of the Rietberg Museum houses a variety of sculptures and statues of Alice Boner from her youth.

Between 1926 and 1930, Boner made trips to Morocco, Tunisia and India with the dancer Uday Shankar. She decided in 1935 to migrate to India.

== Biography ==
=== Early years ===
Alice Boner was born in Italy in 1889 to Swiss parents. After going through the Italian education system, she studied painting and sculpture in Brussels, Munich, and Basel from 1907 to 1911. In 1911 her family moved back to Switzerland, where she began work as an independent sculptor. In 1916, her work was exhibited in the Kunsthaus Zurich (Museum of Modern Art), and by 1925 she had her own studio in the Rokoko-pavilion close to the University of Zurich.

=== Uday Shankar Ballet Troupe ===
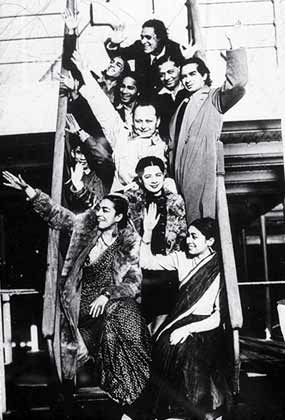
The Uday Shankar Ballet Troupe, c. 1935–1937

In 1926 she saw Uday Shankar perform at the Kursaal Zürich. She was immediately intrigued by the elegant dance movements of Shankar, and with his consent made some sketches on paper and with clay. Boner moved to Paris in 1928 and continued her work as a sculptor. By now her sculptures were placed in public parks and houses in Zurich, Geneva, and Baden. She saw Uday Shankar again in Paris in 1929, and he desired to go back to India to recruit a troupe of musicians and dancers. For Boner, who was fascinated by Indian dance and had long dreamed about going to India, this was a chance for her to go to India and she suggested to accompany Shankar to India.

Boner and Shankar both traveled to India in December 1929. They traveled through India with letters of recommendations from Shankar's father, Pandit Shyam Shankar, who was the former Dewan of Jhalawar State. Thus, they were usually the guests of Maharajas on their travels through India. Even though they informed the Maharajas of their plans to perform Indian dance in the west, they were all reluctant to support them because of the negative connotation that was associated with them had they supported the troupe. By the time they arrived in Kolkata, they changed their plans and recruited most of the members of their troupe from Uday Shankar's family, among them the then still young Ravi Shankar.

Beginning in 1930 the troupe toured together, with its first performance in the Théâtre des Champs-Élysées in Paris on 3 March 1931. Boner's function was essentially that of a co-director. She advertised the troupe, but also helped with costumes and correspondences. After five years with the troupe Boner moved to India in 1935 and then Varanasi, India, in 1936.

=== Life in India ===
After moving to India, Boner began to paint again. She gave up sculpting, saying that it was "too slow a process to catch up with the wealth of aspects India offered to the observing eye". Some of her early pieces were exhibited in Kolkata, Mumbai, and Zurich. In 1939, Boner began to paint Indian deities after studying sacred Indian scriptures, but in accordance with her diary, these paintings were never made public.

Boner went on to become increasingly fascinated by Indian art and philosophy, studying both for the majority of her time in India. She spent much time observing Indian art, especially sculptures, at various sites including the Ellora Cave-temples.

Alice Boner spent her many years in Varanasi, India, settling in a house at Assi Ghat in 1936. She wanted to make a film about Holy Ganga but people from Varanasi did not allow her.

=== Death ===
Alice Boner fell ill while visiting Switzerland, and on 13 April 1981 died in Zurich at the age of 91.

== Influence ==
=== Findings in Indian art ===
Alice Boner studied sculptures intensely, and suggested that while a sculpture is set in a square or rectangular frame, the key geometrical element is a circle. "The circle is divided by diameters ... generally 6, 8, or 12, into equal sections, the vertical and horizontal diameters being the fundamental". It is also important to note that the spacing of the grid lines differs both vertically and horizontally. Boner referred to this as the space division of an image. The grid divides the sculptures into physical sectors, but also determines the positioning of and angles of limbs.

Boner also suggested that oblique parallel lines, based on one of the either 6, 8, or 12 dividing diameters, also serve as orientation for the sculptures. She referred to these lines as time division, as they determine the movement in a sculpture. Aside from the time and space divisions, Boner also describes the principle of integration where the composition of the sculpture determines the meaning.

In 1957, Boner met Pandit Sadashiva Rath Sharma who introduced her to a palm-leaf manuscript called Shilpa Prakasha (IAST: Śilpa Prakāśa). Together they translated and analyzed the text over the next decade and released a book authored by the two of them in 1966. The Shilpa Prakasha essentially proved to Boner that her notion of the sculptures being carved around these strict geometrical concepts was in fact accurate, and not a mere side effect. The Shilpa Prakasha itself was an architects manual on the rules of constructing a Hindu temple, and as such included references to many of the principles Boner had studied previously.

During this whole time, Alice Boner never stopped painting, and her studies on these methods of ancient compositions led Boner to paint a triptych inspired by her findings in the Shilpa Prakasha. The subjects of her triptych are Prakṛti, Vishvarupa, and Kālī. She worked on these large paintings for several years, but was never quite satisfied with them. Today the triptych is on display in the Bharat Kala Bhavan at the Museum of the Banaras Hindu University.

In 1969, an honorary doctor's degree was conferred on Alice Boner by the University of Zurich, based on her academic contributions and publications. The greatest honor was conferred upon her in 1974 when the President of India awarded her the Padma Bhushan, the third highest civilian award in the Republic of India.

== Literature ==
- Bäumer, Bettina (Hrsg), Rupa Pratirupa: Alice Boner Commemoration Volume, Zürich: Museum Rietberg, 1982.
- Boner, Alice, Principles of Compositions in Hindu Sculpture: Cave Temple Period, New Delhi: Motillal Banarsidass 1990 (Leiden: Brill, 1962).
- Boner, Alice and Sadashiva Rath Sharma, Śilpa Prakāśa, revised edition by B. Bäumer, R.P. Das and S. Das (New Delhi: Indira Gandhi National Centre for the Arts and Motilal Banarsidass Publishers, 2005).
- Boner, Alice, «Zur Komposition des Shiva Nataraja im Museum Rietberg», in: Artibus Asiae, Bd. 27, Nr. 4, 1964/65, pp. 301– 310.
- Boner, Alice, «Der symbolische Aspekt der Form», in: Boner und Fischer 1982, pp. 101–106.
- Boner, Alice, «Die Entstehung des Tryptichons», in: Boner und Fischer 1982, pp. 64– 67.
- Boner, Alice, Indien, mein Indien: Tagebuch einer Reise, Zürich: Werner Classen Verlag, 1984.
- Boner, Georgette und Eberhard Fischer, «Einleitende Worte», in: Boner 1984, pp. 6 – 8.
- Boner, Georgette und Eberhard Fischer (Hrsg.), Alice Boner und die Kunst Indiens, Zürich, Museum Rietberg, 1982.
- Boner, Georgette, Luitgard Soni und Jayandra Soni (Hrsg.), Alice Boner Diaries, India 1934–1967, New Delhi: Motilal Banarsidass Publishers, 1993.
