= Lists of Indian film families =

Lists of Indian film families include:

- List of Hindi film families
- List of Marathi film families
- List of South Indian film families

== See also ==
- List of Indian music families
- Nepotism in India
  - Nepotism in Indian film industry
  - Nepotism in Indian judiciary
  - Nepotism in Indian politics
