= Kalpana (1948 film) =

- Poster
- Directed by: Uday Shankar
- Screenplay by: Amritlal Nagar
- Story by: Uday Shankar
- Starring: Uday Shankar; Amala Shankar; Lakshmi Kanta
- Cinematography: K. Ramnoth
- Edited by: N. K. Gopal
- Music by: Vishnudas Shirali
- Production companies: Gemini Studios, Madras
- Distributed by: Uday Shankar Production
- Release date: 1 January 1948
- Running time: 160 minutes
- Country: India
- Language: Hindi

Kalpana (1948) by Uday Shankar

Kalpana (transl. Imagination) is a 1948 Indian Hindi-language dance film written and directed by dancer Uday Shankar. It is his only film. The story revolves around a young dancer's dream of setting up a dance academy, a reflection of Shankar's own academy, which he founded at Almora. It starred Uday Shankar and his wife Amala Shankar as leads.

Kalpana was the first film to present an Indian classical dancer in the leading role, and was entirely shot as a dance ballet and a fantasy.

It was shown at the International Film Festival of India (IFFI-Goa) (2008), as a part of the section "Treasures from NFAI" (National Film Archive of India), with other "rare gems" from the archives.

== Cast ==
- Uday Shankar as Udayan & Writer
- Amala Uday Shankar as Uma
- Lakshmi Kanta as Kamini
- Dr. G. V. Subbarao as Drawing Master
- Birendra Banerji as Noor
- Swaraj Mitter Gupta as Ramesh
- Anil Kumar Chopra as Madan & School Teacher
- Brijo Behari Banerji as Uma's Father
- Chiranjilal Shah as Gope
- Devilal Samar as Sundar
- K. Mukerjee as Grandfather
- Dulal Sen as Mama
- G. V. Karandikar as Producer
- Nagen Dey as Mill Owner
- Ganesh Banerji as Theater Manager
- Syd Jalaluddin as Mukhiya
- Farman Ali as Young Udayan
- Begam Zamarudh as Young Uma
- Yousuf Ali as Young Noor
- Usha Kiran as Usha

== Songs ==
The music was composed by Vishnudas Shirali, and the lyrics were penned by Sumitranandan Pant. The Bhil folk songs were written by Devilal Samar.

Song Title	Singer(s)	Lyricist	Length
"Bharat Jai Jan Bharat"	Everyone	Devilal Samar	03:48
"Behti Ja Behti Ja Sarite"		Devilal Samar	03:21
"Kya Kahoon"		Devilal Samar	02:15
"Bhil Folk Song"		Devilal Samar, Sumitranandan Pant	
"Deep Jalao"		Devilal Samar	03:19
"Hindustan Ka Bal Hai Hal"		Devilal Samar	02:55
"Sadiyo Ki Behoshi"		Devilal Samar	02:57

== Notable dancers ==
- Uday Shankar
- Amala Shankar
- Lakshmi Kanta
- Padmini
- Lalitha
- Ragini
- Amobi Singh
- Yoga

== Comments ==
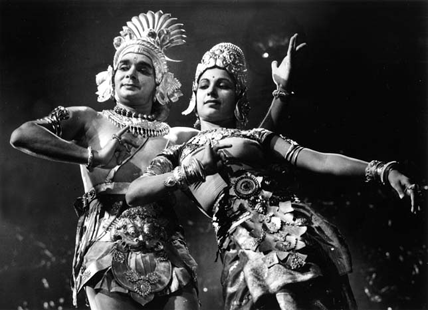
A still featuring Uday and Amala Shankar

Well known Tamil actress and dancer, Lakshmikantham, credited in the film as "Lakshmi Kanta" plays Kamini. 16-year-old actress Padmini and along with her sister Lalitha. Tamil dancer and actress Yoga of the Yoga-Mangalam sisters makes an appearance as a dancer credited as "Yogam". Small role actress P. K. Saraswathi credited as "Saraswathi" also appears as a dancer. Gopal Rao, who played a small role in Thyaga Bhoomi (1939 film), also plays a small role. Finally, Usha Kiran made her debut into films in this movie, credited as "Usha".

Satyajit Ray was said to have watched this film 16 times.

== Restoration ==
In 2009, the film process of digital restoration was taken up by NFAI in collaboration with France-based Thomson Foundation. In 2010, it was being restored by the World Cinema Foundation (director Martin Scorsese is a founding member). The restored film was released in home video format by the Criterion Collection.
