= Tanusree Shankar =

Indian dancer and choreographer (born 1956)

- Tanusree Shankar at Rashtrapati Bhavan during investiture ceremony
- Born: 16 March 1956 (age 70)
- Occupations: dancer and choreographer
- Spouse: Ananda Shankar

Tanusree Shankar (born 16 March 1956) is an Indian dancer and choreographer. She is based in Kolkata, India. She was a leading dancer of the Ananda Shankar Centre for Performing Arts in the 1970s and 1980s. She also acted in various films, such as The Namesake.

Tanusree Shankar now leads the Tanusree Shankar Dance Company. She has evolved her own modern idiom by combining traditional Indian dance with modern Western ballet expressions. She has been inspired as much by her lineage as by the folk and regional dance forms of India. She has drawn extensively from rich local Indian traditions such as the "Thang-ta" (Manipuri Sword dance).

She travels with her troupe extensively around the world. Her last notable productions include Uttaran (Upliftment of the soul) and Chirantan (The eternal), which is based on Rabindranath Tagore's music.

== Family ==
Tanusree Shankar was born in Kolkata. Her father was a doctor in the Indian Army. Her husband, the late Ananda Shankar, was a music composer who experimented with fusion music. He was the son of dancer Pandit Uday Shankar and Amala Shankar, and nephew of the sitar maestro Ravi Shankar. She has a daughter named Sreenanda Shankar.

== Awards ==
- Sangeet Natak Akademi Award, 2011
