= Amala Shankar =

Indian danseuse (1919–2020)

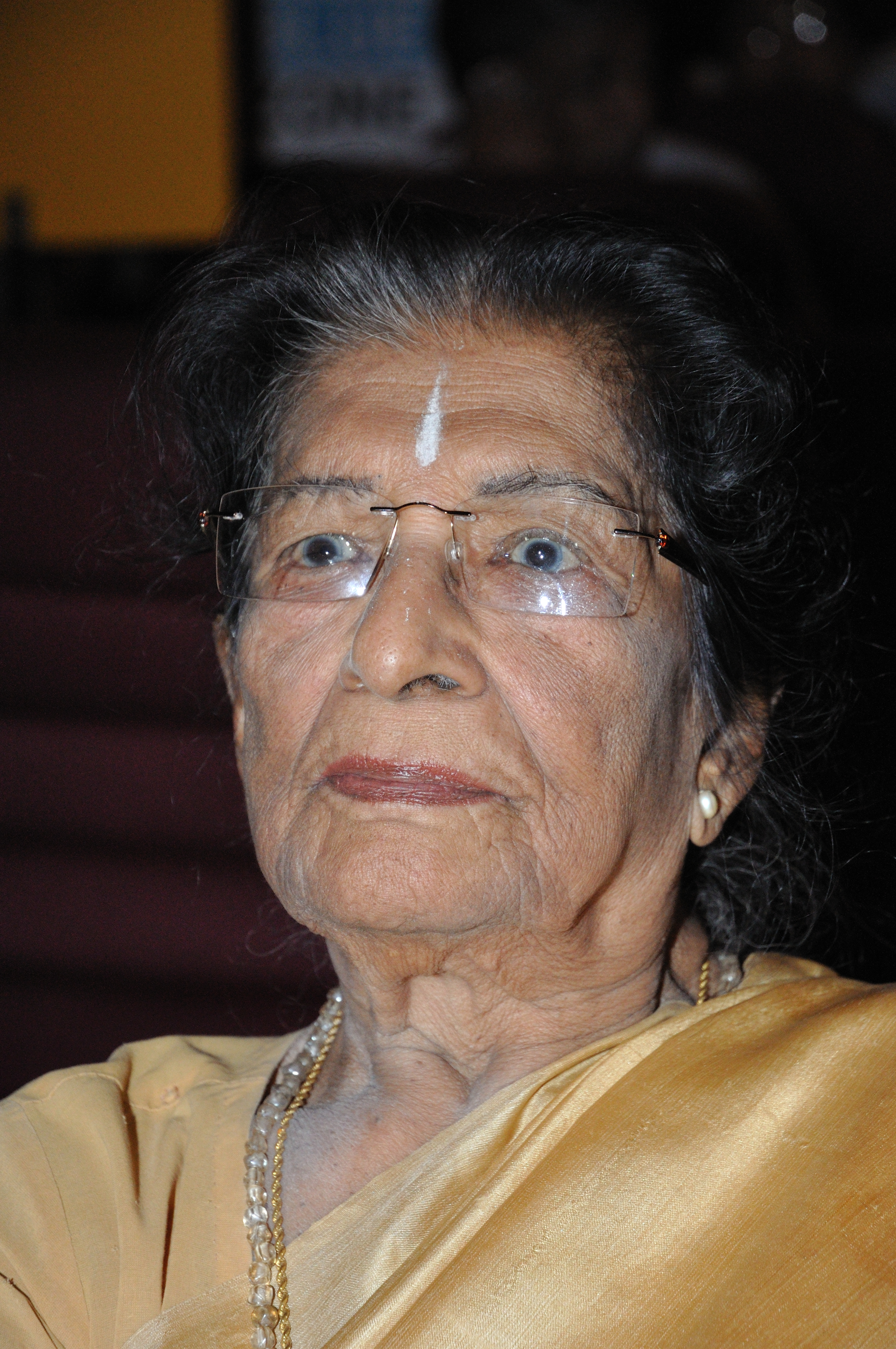
- Shankar in 2011
- Born: Amala Nandy; 27 June 1919; Magura District, Bengal Presidency, British India
- Died: 24 July 2020 (aged 101); Kolkata, West Bengal, India
- Occupations: Dancer, actress
- Years active: 1948
- Spouse: Uday Shankar (m. 1942; died 1977)
- Children: Ananda Shankar; Mamata Shankar

Amala Shankar (née Nandy, 27 June 1919 – 24 July 2020) was an Indian dancer. She was the wife of dancer and choreographer Uday Shankar and mother of musician Ananda Shankar and dancer Mamata Shankar (later she became an actress) and sister-in-law of musician and composer Ravi Shankar. Amala Shankar acted in the film Kalpana written, co-produced and directed by husband Uday Shankar. She died on Friday, 24 July 2020, in West Bengal's Kolkata, India aged 101.

== Biography ==
Amala Shankar was born as Amala Nandy on 27 June 1919 in Batajor Village, Magura District, Bengal Presidency, British India (modern-day Bangladesh). Her father Akhoy Kumar Nandy wanted his children to be interested in nature and villages. In 1931, when she was 11 years old she went to the International Colonial Exhibition in Paris. Here she met Uday Shankar and his family. Amala at that time was wearing a frock. Uday Shankar's mother Hemangini Devi gave her a Saree to wear. She joined Uday Shankar's dance troupe and performed across the world.

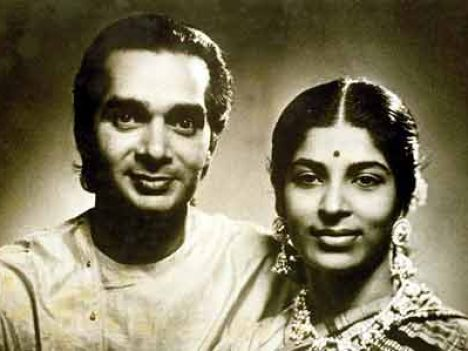
Uday Shankar and Amala Shankar in 1941

In 1939 when she was staying in Chennai with Uday Shankar's dance group, one day came to Amala at night and gave her marriage proposal. Uday Shankar married Amala in 1942. Their first son Ananda Shankar was born in December 1942. Their daughter Mamata Shankar was born in January 1954 . Uday Shankar and Amala Shankar was a popular dance couple for a long time. But, later Uday Shankar was romantically involved with a young girl of his troupe and he produced Chandalika without Amala. Uday Shankar died in 1977. The last few years, the couple lived separately. Amala Shankar & Uday Shankar had established the dance institution Uday Shankar India Culture Centre (1965 - 2015) in Kolkata after Uday Shankar's Almora dance centre by the same name had closed down in the early 1940s. Amala Shankar created this dance institution where Uday Shankar's Creative Dance was taught from the beginning to the Junior (5 - 15 years) and Senior (15 years onward) classes. Alongside, it was compulsory to learn three classical forms of Indian dance: Bharatanatyam (taught by Guru Gyanprakash), Kathakali (by Guru P. Raghavan) and Manipuri (by Ojha Tarun Singh). In this institution, Amala Shankar followed the structure of the Almora Centre as exactly as possible. She herself was in charge of the Creative Dance section, while all the classical dances were taught by master teachers trained and established from the traditional communities these dances belonged to. The Centre's first public performance was held in 1967, as the Annual Show, that became a tradition every year, where the parents of the students got to see the progress of the students. As the Director-in-Charge of the Kolkata Centre, Amala Shankar created Chidambara (based on poems by renowned poet Sumitranandan Panth), Vasavadatta (where Amala played the lead role), Seeta Swayambar (where Amala Shankar played the role of King Janaka), Yuga Chhanda (A modern presentation choreographed on the music by Ananda Shankar), Samanya Kshati (based on a poem by Rabindranath Tagore, originally choreographed by Uday Shankar, and recreated by Amala Shankar after his death), Chitrangada (a dance drama created by Rabindranath Tagore), Mahamanav (recreated shadow-play production on life of Buddha - originally choreographed by Uday Shankar). These productions were popular all over India and Uday Shankar India Culture Centre continued its international and national tours till 2006. She also got invited as a pedagogue and teacher of Creative Dance frequently to hold dance workshops in world famous institutions, near and far. As of 2012 Amala Shankar was still active and has kept Shankar gharana alive with her daughter Mamata and daughter-in-law Tanushree Shankar. She also has had many extremely successful students who have loved and lived and taught dance in and outside India. She was the sister-in-law of Ravi Shankar, who was a Sitarist. Remaining active until her nineties, her last performance was the dance drama Sita Swayamvar at the age of 92, in which she played the role of King Janaka.

== Kalpana ==
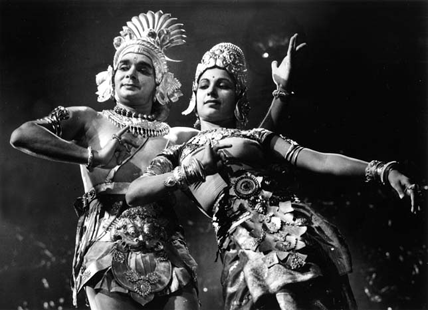
Kalpana, 1948 film showing Uday Shankar and Amala Shankar

Amala Shankar acted in the film Kalpana (1948). The film was written, co-produced and directed by Uday Shankar, who also appeared in the film. Amala played the character of Uma. Amala Shankar attended the 2012 Cannes Film Festival where the film was screened. Amala Shankar said in an interview– "2012 Cannes Film Festival... I was the youngest film star at the Cannes Film Festival... I am revisiting Cannes after a span of 81 years..."

== Filmography ==
Year	Film	Director	Co-stars
1948	Kalpana	Uday Shankar	Lakshmi Kanta, Uday Shankar
