= Ananda Shankar =

Indian musician (1942–1999)

- Born: Ananda Shankar; 11 December 1942; Almora, United Provinces, British India
- Died: 26 March 1999 (aged 56) Calcutta, West Bengal, India
- Genres: World music
- Occupations: Musician; singer; composer

Ananda Shankar (11 December 1942 – 26 March 1999) was an Indian sitar player, singer, and composer whose music blended Western and Eastern musical styles. He was married to dancer and choreographer Tanusree Shankar.

== Life ==
Born in Almora, Uttar Pradesh (now in Uttarakhand), North India, Shankar was the son of Amala Shankar and Uday Shankar, who were dancers of Bengali heritage, and also the nephew of sitar player Ravi Shankar. He studied in The Scindia School, Gwalior. Ananda did not learn sitar from his uncle but studied instead with Lalmani Misra at Banaras Hindu University. He was married to Tanushree Shankar, who was herself a dancer, with whom he had a daughter named Sreenanda Shankar, who is now an actress and dancer. He died in Kolkata on 26 March 1999 aged 56 from cardiac failure.

== Professional career ==
In the late 1960s, Shankar travelled to Los Angeles, where he played with many contemporary musicians including Jimi Hendrix. There he was signed to Reprise Records and released his first album, Ananda Shankar, in 1970, with original Indian classical material alongside sitar-based cover versions of popular hits, The Rolling Stones' "Jumpin' Jack Flash" and The Doors' "Light My Fire". The album is included in the book 1001 Albums You Must Hear Before You Die.

Returning to India in the early 1970s, Shankar continued to experiment musically and in 1975 released his album, Ananda Shankar and His Music, a jazz-funk mix of Eastern sitar, Western rock guitar, tabla and mridangam, drums and Moog synthesizers. Out of print for many years, the album was re-released on CD in 2005.

After working in India during the late 1970s and 1980s, Shankar's profile in the West began to rise again in the mid-1990s as his music found its way into club DJ sets, particularly in London. His music was brought to a wider audience with the release of Blue Note Records' 1996 rare groove compilation album, Blue Juice Vol. 1., including two tracks from Ananda Shankar and His Music, "Dancing Drums" and "Streets of Calcutta".

In the late 1990s, Shankar worked and toured in the United Kingdom with the London DJ State of Bengal and others, a collaboration that resulted in the Walking On album, featuring Shankar's trademark sitar soundscapes mixed with breakbeat and hip hop. Walking On was released in 2000 after Shankar's death the previous year.

== Discography ==
- Ananda Shankar, 1970 (LP, Reprise 6398; CD, Collectors' Choice CCM-545)
- Ananda Shankar and His Music, 1975 (EMI India)
- India Remembers Elvis, 1977 (EP, EMI India S/7EPE. 3201)
- Missing You, 1977 (EMI India)
- A Musical Discovery of India, 1978 (EMI India)
- Sa-Re-Ga Machan, 1981 (EMI India)
- 2001, 1984 (EMI India)
- Yaaro Ezhuthiya Kavithai (soundtrack) (1986)
- Temptations, 1992 (Gramaphone Company of India)
- Ananda Shankar: Shubh – The Auspicious, 1995
- Ananda, 1999 (EMI India)
- Arpan, 2000 (EMI India)
- Walking On, 2000 (Real World 48118–2, with State of Bengal)
- Ananda Shankar: A Life in Music – The Best of the EMI Years, 2005 (Times Square TSQ-CD-9052)
