= Uday Shankar =

Indian dancer, choreographer, actor

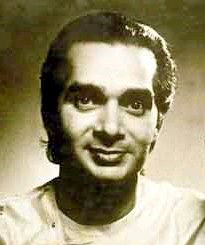
- Born: 8 December 1900; Udaipur, Udaipur State, British India
- Died: 26 September 1977 (aged 76); Kolkata, West Bengal, India
- Occupations: Dancer, choreographer
- Spouse: Amala Shankar
- Children: Ananda Shankar; Mamata Shankar
- Honours: Sangeet Natak Akademi Fellowship (1962); Padma Vibhushan (1971)

Uday Shankar (born Uday Shankar Chowdhury; 8 December 1900 – 26 September 1977) was an Indian dancer and choreographer, best known for creating a fusion style of dance, adapting European theatrical techniques to Indian classical dance, imbued with elements of Indian classical, folk, and tribal dance, which he later popularised in India, Europe, and the United States in the 1920s and 1930s. He was a pioneer of modern dance in India.

In 1962, he was awarded by Sangeet Natak Akademi, India's National Academy for Music, Dance and Drama, with its highest award, the Sangeet Natak Akademi Fellowship for lifetime achievement, and in 1971, the Govt. of India, awarded him its second highest civilian award the Padma Vibhushan.

== Early life and education ==
Uday Shankar Chowdhury was born in Udaipur, Rajasthan, the eldest son of a Bengali Brahmin family with origins in Narail (present-day Bangladesh). His father Shyam Shankar Chowdhury, a noted barrister, was employed with the Maharaja of Jhalawar in Rajasthan at the time of his eldest son's birth, and his mother Hemangini Devi was descended from a zamindari family. His father was granted the title, 'Harchowdhury' by the Maharajas, but he preferred to use the surname 'Chowdhury' minus 'Har.' Uday's younger brothers were Rajendra Shankar, Debendra Shankar, Bhupendra Shankar and Ravi Shankar. Of his siblings, Bhupendra died young in 1926.

Uday Shankar's father was a Sanskrit scholar, who graduated with honours from the University of Calcutta and later studied at Oxford University, where he became a Doctor of Philosophy. Because his father moved frequently on account of his work, the family spent much time in Uday's maternal uncle's house in Nasratpur with his mother and brothers. Uday's studies also took place at various locations including Nasratpur, Gazipur, Varanasi, and Jhalawar. At his Gazipur school, he learnt music and photography from Ambika Charan Mukhopaddhay, his Drawing and Crafts teacher.

In 1918, at the age of eighteen, he was sent to Mumbai to train at the J. J. School of Art and then to Gandharva Mahavidyalaya. By now, Shyam Shankar had resigned his post in Jhalawar and moved to London. Here he married an English woman and practised law, before becoming an amateur impresario, introducing Indian dance and music to Britain. Subsequently, Uday joined his father in London, and on 23 August 1920, joined the Royal College of Art, London to study painting under Sir William Rothenstein. He danced at a few charity performances that his father had organized in London, and on one such occasion, noted Russian ballerina Anna Pavlova happened to be present. This was to have a lasting impact on his career.

== Career ==
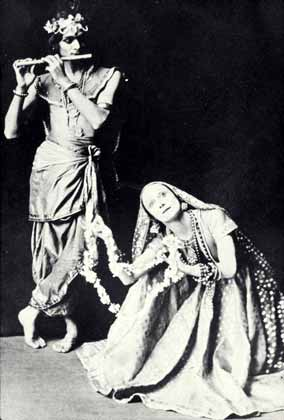
Uday Shankar and Anna Pavlova in the famous 'Radha-Krishna' ballet, 1923

Uday Shankar did not have any formal training in any of the Indian classical dance forms. Nevertheless, his presentations were creative. From a young age, he had been exposed to both Indian classical dance and folk dance, as well as to ballet during his stay in Europe. He decided to bring elements of both styles together to create a new dance, which he called Hi-dance. He went on to translate classical Indian dance forms and their iconography to dance movements, after studying the Rajput painting and Mughal painting styles at the British Museum. Further, during his stay in Britain, he came across several performing artists, subsequently when he left for Rome on the 'Prix de Rome' scholarship of the French Government, for advanced studies in art.

Soon his interaction with such artists grew and so did the idea to transform Indian dance into a contemporary form. The turning point came with his first meetings with legendary Russian ballerina Anna Pavlova. She was looking for artists to collaborate on India-based themes. This led to the creation of ballets based on Hindu themes, 'Radha-Krishna', a duet with Anna, and 'Hindu Wedding', for inclusion in her production, 'Oriental Impressions'. The ballet was presented at the Royal Opera House, Covent Garden, in London. Later he continued to conceive and choreograph ballets, including one based on the Ajanta Caves frescoes, which was performed across the United States. In time his style of dance came to be known as 'Hi-dance', though later he called it 'Creative dance'.

He worked with Anna for one and a half years, before starting out on his own in Paris.

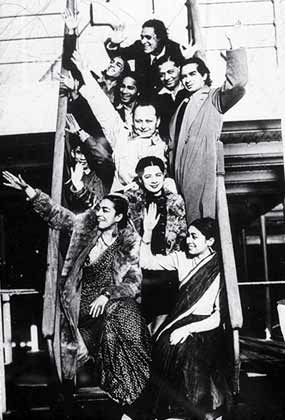
'Uday Shankar Ballet Troupe', ca (1935–37).

Shankar returned to India in 1927, along with a French pianist, Simon Barbiere, who was now his disciple and dance partner, and a Swiss sculptor, Alice Boner, who wanted to study Indian art history. He was welcomed by Rabindranath Tagore himself, who also persuaded him to open a performing arts school in India.

On his return to Paris in 1931, he founded Europe's first Indian dance company, along with Alice Boner, who by now had become one of his disciples. Together with musicians Vishnu Dass Shirali and Timir Baran, he created a new template for music to accompany his newly devised movements. His first series of dance performances were held on 3 March 1931, at the Champs-Elysees Theatre in Paris, which was to become his base as he toured through Europe.

Soon he embarked on a seven-year tour through Europe and America with his own troupe, which he called – 'Uday Shankar and his Hindu Ballet', under the aegis of impresario Sol Hurok and Celebrity Series of Boston of impresario, Aaron Richmond. He performed in the United States for the first time in January 1933 in New York City, along with his dance partner Simkie, a French dancer. As part of the visit, a reception was held at the Grand Central Art Galleries. After, Shankar and his troupe set out on an 84-city tour throughout the country.

His adaptation of European theatrical techniques to Indian dance made his art hugely popular both in India and abroad, and he is rightly credited for ushering in a new era for traditional Indian temple dances, which until then had been known for their strict interpretations, and which were also going through their own revival. Meanwhile, his brother Ravi Shankar was helping to popularise Indian classical music in the outside world.

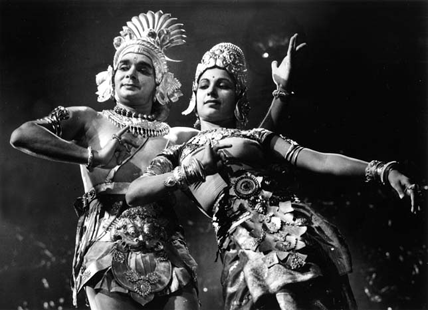
Kalpana, 1948 film showing Uday Shankar and Amala Shankar

In 1936, he was invited by Leonard Knight Elmhirst, who had earlier assisted Rabindranath Tagore in building Sriniketan, close to Shanti Niketan, to visit Dartington Hall, Totnes, Devon for a six-month residency, with his troupe and lead dancer, Simkie. Also present there were Michel Chekhov, nephew of Russian playwright Anton Chekhov, the German modern dancer-choreographer, Kurt Jooss and another German Rudolf Laban, who had invented a system of dance notation. This experience only added more exuberance to his expressionist dance.

In 1938, he made India his base, and established the 'Uday Shankar India Cultural Centre', at Simtola, 3 km from Almora, in Uttarakhand Himalayas, and invited Sankaran Namboodri for Kathakali, Kandappa Pillai for Bharatanatyam, Amubi Singh for Manipuri and Ustad Allauddin Khan for music. Soon, he had a large assemblage of artists and dancers, including Guru Dutt, Shanti Bardhan, Simkie, Amala, Satyavati, Narendra Sharma, Ruma Guha Thakurta, Prabhat Ganguly, Zohra Sehgal, Uzra, Lakshmi Shankar, Shanta Gandhi; his own brothers Rajendra, Debendra and Ravi also joined him as students. The centre, however, closed after four years in 1942, due to a paucity of funds. As his students dispersed, he regrouped his energies and headed South, where he made his only film, Kalpana (Imagination) in 1948, based on his dance, in which both he and his wife Amala Shankar danced. The film was produced and shot at Gemini Studios, Madras. In 2008, the film was digitally restored by the Cineteca di Bologna, in association with The Film Foundation’s World Cinema Project and the National Film Archive of India, among others.

Uday Shankar settled in Ballygunge, Kolkata in 1960, where the "Uday Shankar Center for Dance" was opened in 1965. In 1962, he was awarded the highest award of the Sangeet Natak Akademi, the Sangeet Natak Akademi Fellowship for his lifetime contribution to Indian dance.

== Personal life ==
Uday was the elder brother of Ravi Shankar. He married his dance partner, Amala Shankar, and together they had a son, Ananda Shankar, born in 1942, and a daughter, Mamata Shankar, born in 1955. Ananda Shankar became a musician and composer who trained with Dr. Lalmani Misra rather than with his uncle, Ravi Shankar, and in time became known for his fusion music, encompassing both European and Indian music styles. Mamata Shankar, a dancer like her parents, became a noted actress, working in films by Satyajit Ray and Mrinal Sen. She also runs the 'Udayan Dance Company' in Kolkata, and travels extensively through the world.

== Legacy ==
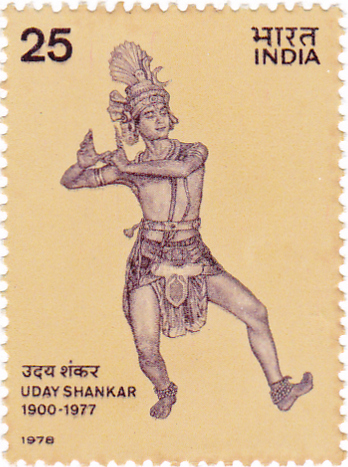
Uday Shankar on a 1978 stamp of India

Uday (b. 1900, d. 1977) and Amala Shankar (b. 1919, d. 2020) decided to open Uday Shankar India Culture Centre (named after Uday Shankar's Almora centre for dance) in Kolkata in 1965, where Amala Shankar remained the Director-in-Charge, from the day of its inception. She was awarded the Padma Bhushan in 1991. The school continued until 2015, remaining dedicated to carrying on with Shankar's ideas about processes of innovative and creative dance making.

Shankar's followers and associates include Shanti Bardhan, creator of Ramayana ballets presentations, Guru Dutt, one of India's finest film directors, Lakshmi Shankar, a noted classical singer, Zohra Sehgal, who performed on the stage, television, and the cinema both in India and in Britain.

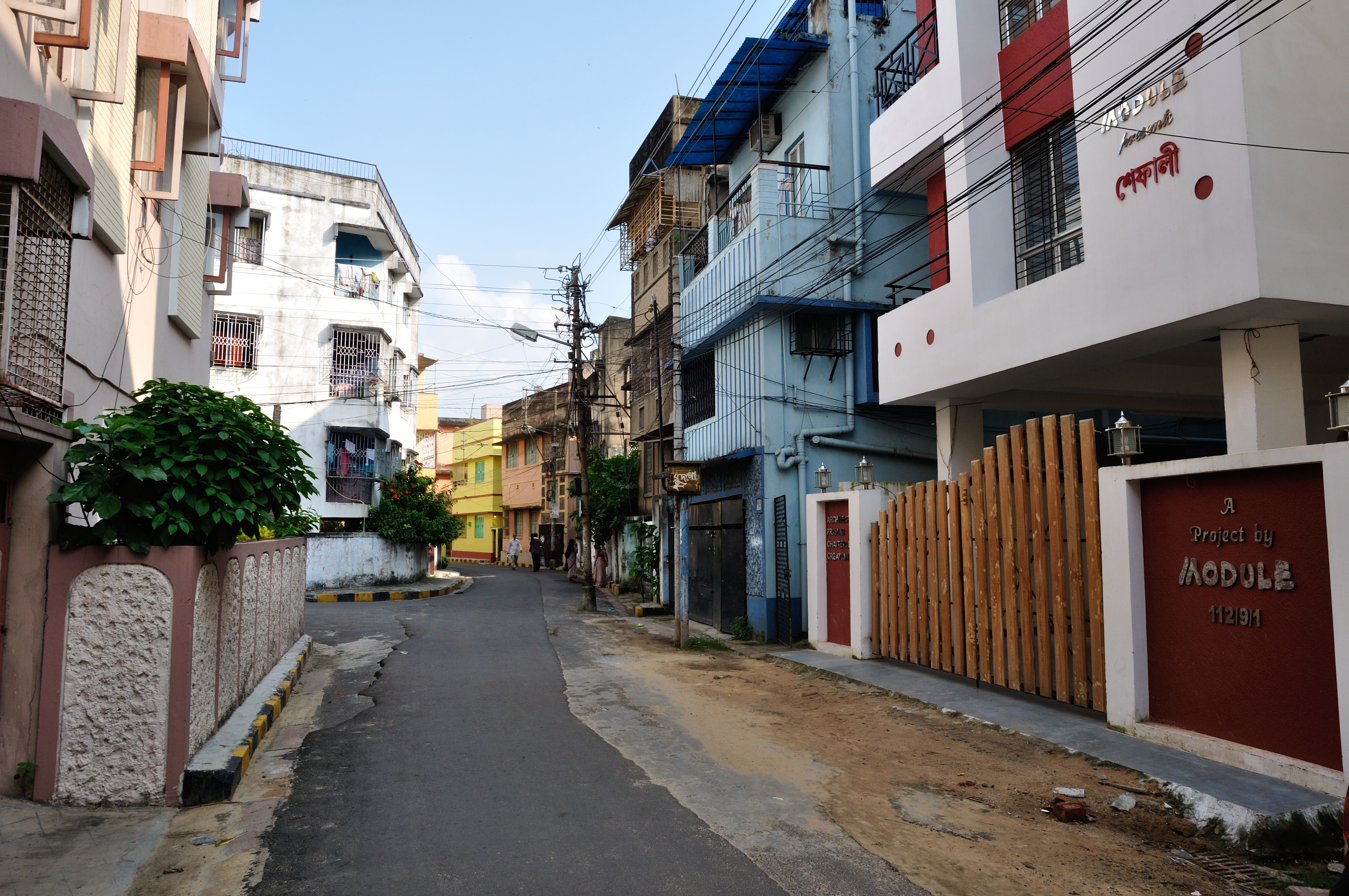
The Uday Shankar Sarani at Tollygunge area of Kolkata.

In December 1983, his younger brother, sitar player Ravi Shankar organised a four-day festival, Uday-Utsav Festival in New Delhi, marking the 60th anniversary of his professional debut in 1923, highlighted by performances by his disciples, films, an exhibition and orchestral music composed and orchestrated by Ravi Shankar himself. The centenary celebrations of his birth were formally launched at the UNESCO headquarters in Paris on 26 April 2001, where dancers, choreographers and scholars from all over the world assembled to pay homage to Uday Shankar.
In the Tollygunge area of south Kolkata, the Golf Club road has been renamed to Uday Shankar Sarani.

== Awards ==
- 1960: Sangeet Natak Akademi Award – 'Creative Dance'
- 1962: Sangeet Natak Akademi Fellowship
- 1971: Padma Vibhushan
- 1975: Desikottama, Visva-Bharati University

== See also ==
- List of dancers

== Selected discography ==
- The Original Uday Shankar Company of Hindu Musicians, Recorded During the Historic 1937 Visit to the United States, instrumental ensemble: Vishnudass Shirala, Sisir Sovan, Rabindra (Ravi Shankar), Dulal Sen, Nagen Dey, Brijo Behari
  - Indian Music: Ragas and Dances, The Original Uday Shankar Company of Hindu Musicians. Recorded during the historic 1937 visit to the United States. RCA/Victrola VIC-1361 (1968 reissue, 10 tracks: 4 ragas, 5 dances, 1 bhajan)
  - Ravi Shankar: Flowers of India El Records (2007), containing all tracks from the original album
