= List of Indian Bengali films of the 1950s =

This is a list of films produced by Tollywood (Bengali language film industry) based in Kolkata in the 1950s.

== 1950 ==
Title	Director	Cast	Genre	Notes
Baikunther Will	Manu Sen	Molina Devi, Jahan Ganguly, Bikash Roy		
Chinnamul	Nemai Ghosh	Gangapata Basu, Ritwik Ghatak	Historical drama	
Kankal	Naresh Mitra	Dhiraj Bhattacharya, Jiben Bose, Naresh Mitra	Horror	
Mandanda	Ratan Chatterjee	Bhanu Bannerjee, Biman Bannerjee, Kanu Bannerjee		
Maryada	Digambar Chattopadhyay	Uttam Kumar, Pahari Sanyal	Drama	
Mejdidi	Sabyasachi	Jahar Ganguly, Nripati Chattopadhyay, Tulsi Chakraborty		
Michael Madhusudhan	Modhu Bose	Utpal Dutt, Devjani, Miriam Stark		
Sudhar Prem	Premankur Atorthy	Asit Baran, Manoranjan Bhattacharya		
Radharani	Sudhish Ghatak	Tulsi Chakraborty, Molina Devi		
Vidyasagar	Kali Prasad Ghosh	Gurudas Banerjee, Tarakumar Bhaduri, Chhabi Biswas		

== 1951 ==
Title	Director	Cast	Genre	Notes
Barjatri	Satyen Bose	Bhanu Bandopadhyay, Anup Kumar, Haradan Bandopadhyay	Drama	
Ekti Raat	Chitta Basu	Uttam Kumar, Suchitra Sen, Anup Kumar	Drama	
Jighansa	Ajoy Kar	Manju Dey, Bikash Roy, Kamal Mitra	Thriller	
Nastaneer	Pashupati Chatterjee	Sunanda Bannerjee, Uttam Kumar	Drama	
Ore Jatri	Rajen Choudhury	Uttam Kumar, Prabha Devi, Anubha Gupta	Drama	
Sahajatri	Agradoot	Molina Devi, Uttam Kumar	Drama	

== 1952 ==
Title	Director	Cast	Genre	Notes
Basu Poribar	Nirmal Dey	Sabitri Chatterjee, Uttam Kumar, Supriya Devi	Drama	
Bindur Chhele	Chitta Bose	Ajit Bannerjee, Kanu Bannerjee, Bibhu Bhattacharya		
Hanabari	Premendra Mitra	Dhiraj Bhattacharya, Nabadwip Halder	Thriller	
Kapal Kundala	Ardhendu Mukherjee			
Kar Pape	Kali Prasad Ghosh	Asitbaran, Chhabi Biswas, Aparna Devi		
Kuhelika	Ramesh Bose	Ahindra Choudhury, Tulsi Chakraborty, Amar Choudhury		
Pasher Bari	Sudhir Mukherjee	Bhanu Bannerjee, Sabitri Chatterjee	Romance	
Sanjibani	Sukumar Dasgupta	Uttam Kumar, Reba Devi	Drama	

== 1953 ==
Title	Director	Cast	Genre	Notes
Bou Thakuranir Haat	Naresh Mitra	Uttam Kumar, Pahari Sanyal, Sambhu Mitra	Drama	
Keranir Jibon	Dilip Mukherjee	Bhanu Bandopadhyay, Jahor Roy, Tulsi Chakraborty, Sabitri Chatterjee	Drama	
Lakh Taka	Niren Lahiri	Uttam Kumar, Sabitri Chatterjee, Bhanu Bannerjee	Drama	
Nabin Jatra	Subodh Mitra	Uttam Kumar, Maya Mukherjee, Tulsi Chakraborty	Drama	
Parineeta	Bimal Roy	Moni Bhattacharjee, Sarat Chanda Chattopadhyay, Kamal Chowdhary		
Saat Number Kayedi	Sukumar Dasgupta	Suchitra Sen, Chhabi Biswas, Kamal Mitra	Drama	
Sharey Chuattor	Nirmal Dey	Tulsi Chakraborty, Molina Devi, Uttam Kumar	Comedy	

== 1954 ==
Title	Director	Cast	Genre	Notes
Agni Pariksha	Agradoot	Uttam Kumar, Suchitra Sen	Romance, Drama	
Annapurnar Mandir	Naresh Mitra	Uttam Kumar, Suchitra Sen, Sabitri Chatterjee	Social Drama	
Anupama	Agradoot	Sabitri Chatterjee, Jahar Ganguly, Anubha Gupta		
Bakul	Bholanath Mitra	Uttam Kumar, Arundhati Devi, Tulsi Chakraborty	Drama	
Bhangagara	Sushil Majumdar	Sandhya Rani, Chhaya Devi, Sabitri Chatterjee	Drama	
Bidhilipi	Manu Sen	Chhabi Biswas, Nripati Chatterjee, Prasanta Chatterjee		
Bratacharini	Kamal Ganguly	Sabitri Chatterjee, Uttam Kumar, Sandhya Rani		
Champadangar Bou	Nirmal Dey	Uttam Kumar, Sabitri Chatterjee, Tulsi Chakraborty	Drama	
Chheley Kaar	Chitta Basu	Bikash Roy, Bhanu Bannerjee, Chhabi Biswas	Romance, Comedy	
Dhooli	Pinaki Mukherjee	Suchitra Sen, Mala Sinha, Chhabi Biswas	Drama	
Grihapravesh	Ajoy Kar	Uttam Kumar, Suchitra Sen, Bhanu Bannerjee	Drama	
Kalyani	Niren Lahiri	Uttam Kumar, Anubha Gupta, Sabitri Chatterjee		
Mantra Shakti	Chitta Basu	Uttam Kumar, Anubha Gupta, Asit Baran, Bhanu Bannerjee	Drama	
Maraner Pare	Satish Dasgupta	Uttam Kumar, Suchitra Sen, Sambhu Mitra	Drama	
Moner Mayur	Sushil Majumdar	Uttam Kumar, Bhanu Bannerjee, Tulsi Chakraborty	Drama	
Moyla Kagaj	Premendra Mitra	Anil Chatterjee, Dhiraj Bhattacharya, Tulsi Chakraborty	Social Drama	
Ora Thake Odhare	Sukumar Dasgupta	Uttam Kumar, Suchitra Sen, Bhanu Bandopadhyay	Romance, Comedy	
Sadanander Mela	Sukumar Dasgupta	Bhanu Bannerjee, Chhabi Biswas, Uttam Kumar, Suchitra Sen	Drama	
Satir Dehatyag	Manu Sen	Shubhendu Chattopadhyay, Kamal Mitra, Raja Mukherjee		
Vikram Urvashi	Modhu Bose	Sadhona Bose, Biren Chatterjee, Nilima Das		

== 1955 ==
Title	Director	Cast	Genre	Notes
Bhagavan Sri Ramakrishna	Prafulla Chakraborty	Kanu Banerjee	Biographical film	Available on YouTube and mentioned in 2012 news
Dakinir Char	Premendra Mitra	Dhiraj Bhattacharya, Jahor Roy	Horror	
Debatra	Haridas Bhattacharya	Gangapada Basu, Ahindra Choudhury, Kanan Devi		
Dui Bon	Chandrasekhar Basu	Kamala Adhikari, Bibhu Bhattacharya, Nripati Chatterjee		
Hrad	Ardhendu Sen	Uttam Kumar, Chhabi Biswas, Jahor Roy	Drama	
Kankabatir Ghat	Chitta Bose	Uttam Kumar, Anup Kumar	Drama	
Pather Panchali	Satyajit Ray	Subir Banerjee, Kanu Banerjee	Drama	The first of The Apu Trilogy
Prashna	Chandrashekhar Basu	Arundhati Devi, Asit Baran, Bikash Roy, Chhabi Biswas	Drama	
Raat Bhore	Mrinal Sen	Uttam Kumar, Sabitri Chatterjee, Chhabi Biswas		
Raikamal	Subodh Mitra	Kaberi Bose, Uttam Kumar, Nitish Mukherjee		
Rani Rashmoni	Kali Prasad Ghosh	Molina Devi, Gurudas Banerjee	Drama	Biopic on Rani Rashmoni
Saajher Pradip	Sudhangshu Mukherjee	Suchitra Sen, Chhabi Biswas, Tulsi Chakraborty		
Sabar Uparey	Agradoot	Uttam Kumar, Suchitra Sen	Crime Thriller	
Shap Mochan	Sudhir Mukherjee	Uttam Kumar, Suchitra Sen	Romance, Drama	
Upahar	Tapan Sinha	Kanu Bannerjee, Sudhiranjan Mukhopadhyay, Tapan Sinha		

== 1956 ==
Title	Director	Cast	Genre	Notes
Aparajito	Satyajit Ray	Kanu Banerjee, Karuna Banerjee	Drama	Won the Golden Lion at the Venice Film Festival
Chirokumar Sabha	Debaki Kumar Bose	Jiben Bose, Ajit Chatterjee, Ahindra Choudhury		
Ekti Raat	Chitta Basu	Uttam Kumar, Suchitra Sen, Tulsi Chakraborty	Comedy	
Laksha-Hira	Chittaranjan Mitra	Nilima Das, Chandrabati Devi, Manju Dey		
Mahakavi Girish Chandra	Madhu Bose	Pahadi Sanyal, Gurudas Banerjee, Molina Devi	Drama	Biopic on Girish Chandra Ghosh
Mahanisha	Sukumar Dasgupta	Bhanu Bandopadhyay, Bani Gangopadhyay, Anubha Gupta		
Nabajanma	Debaki Kumar Bose	Ajit Bandopadhyay, Kalu Bannerjee, Sabita Basu		
Prithibi Amare Chaay	Niren Lahiri	Uttam Kumar, Mala Sinha, Asit Baran		
Putrabadhu	Chitta Bose	Uttam Kumar, Mala Sinha, Bibhu Bhattacharya		
Sadhak Ramprasad	Banshi Ash	Gurudas Banerjee, Chhabi Biswas, Abhi Bhattacharya, Tulsi Chakraborty	Devotional	
Sagarika	Agragami	Uttam Kumar, Suchitra Sen, Anup Kumar, Jamuna Sinha	Romance, Drama	
Saheb Bibi Golam	Karthik Chatterjee	Sumitra Devi, Uttam Kumar, Chhabi Biswas	Drama	
Shankar Narayan Bank		Chhabi Biswas, Kaberi Bose, Chhaya Devi	Drama	
Shilpi	Agragami	Sikharani Bag, Kali Bannerjee, Molina Devi		
Shyamali	Ajoy Kar	Kaberi Bose	Romance, Drama	
Trijama	Agradoot	Uttam Kumar, Suchitra Sen	Romance, Drama	

== 1957 ==
Title	Director	Cast	Genre	Notes
Abhoyer Biye	Sukumar Dasgupta	Uttam Kumar, Sabitri Chatterjee, Sova Sen, Aparna Devi	Drama	
Adarsha Hindu Hotel	Ardhendu Sen	Chhabi Biswas, Anup Kumar	Drama	
Baksiddha	Bireshwar Basu	Chhabi Biswas, Jahar Ganguly, Tulsi Lahiri	Drama	
Bardidi	Ajoy Kar	Uttam Kumar, Chhabi Biswas, Chhaya Devi	Drama	
Harano Sur	Ajoy Kar	Uttam Kumar, Utpal Dutt, Suchitra Sen	Romance, Drama	
Harjeet	Manu Sen	Uttam Kumar, Anita Guha, Basanta Choudhury	Romance, Drama	
Harischandra	Phani Burma	Chhabi Biswas, Anup Kumar, Tulsi Chakraborty	Drama	
Jatra Holo Shuru	Santosh Ganguly	Dhiresh Bannerjee, Sabita Chatterjee, Uttam Kumar		
Jiban Trishna	Asit Sen	Uttam Kumar, Suchitra Sen, Bikash Roy	Drama	
Kabuliwala	Tapan Sinha	Chhabi Biswas	Drama	
Nilachaley Mahaprabhu	Kartik Chattopadhyay	Ahindra Choudhury, Bhanu Bandyopadhyay, Nripati Chattopadhyay, Asim Kumar	Biographical drama	
Pathey Holo Deri	Agradoot	Uttam Kumar, Suchitra Sen		
Prithvi Amarey Chai	Niren Lahiri	Uttam Kumar, Mala Sinha, Sandhya Rani	Drama	
Punar Milan	Manu Sen	Kanu Bannerjee, Sabitri Chatterjee, Jahar Ganguly		
Surer Parashey	Chitta Bose	Master Babua, Kali Bannerjee, Chhabi Biswas		
Tasher Ghar	Mangal Chakravarty	Uttam Kumar, Sabitri Chatterjee, Sabita Bose		

== 1958 ==
Title	Director	Cast	Genre	Notes
Ajantrik	Ritwik Ghatak	Kali Banerjee, Ganga Pada Basu, Tulsi Chakraborty	Drama	
Bandhu	Chitta Bose	Chhabi Biswas, Uttam Kumar, Mala Sinha		
Bhanu Pelo Lottery		Bhanu Bandopadhyay, Jahor Roy, Lily Chakravarty	Comedy	
Indrani	Niren Lahiri	Uttam Kumar, Suchitra Sen	Romance, Drama	
Jalsaghar	Satyajit Ray	Chhabi Biswas	Drama	
Jamalaye Jibanta Manush	Prafulla Chakraborty	Bhanu Banerjee, Chhabi Biswas, Tulsi Chakraborty	Mythological	
Joutuk	Jiban Ganguly	Jiben Bose, Tulsi Chakraborty, Molina Devi		
Manmoyee Girls' School	Hemchandra Chunder	Bhanu Bannerjee, Karuna Bannerjee, Dhiraj Bhattacharya		
Parash Pathar	Satyajit Ray	Tulsi Chakraborty, Kali Banerjee, Jahor Roy	Fantasy Comedy	
Rajlakshmi O Srikanta	Haridas Bhattacharya	Uttam Kumar, Suchitra Sen	Drama	
Sadhak Bamakhyapa	Narayan Ghosh	Gurudas Banerjee, Tulsi Chakraborty, Molina Devi, Chhabi Biswas	Devotional	
Suryatoran	Agradoot	Bhanu Bannerjee, Kali Bannerjee, Chhabi Biswas		
Swarga Martya	Ashim Pal	Bhanu Bandopadhyay, Manju Dey, Jiben Bose, Tulsi Chakraborty	Comedy	

== 1959 ==
Title	Director	Cast	Genre	Notes
Abak Prithibi	Bishu Chakraborty	Uttam Kumar, Tarun Kumar, Tulsi Chakraborty	Drama	
Apur Sansar	Satyajit Ray	Soumitra Chatterjee, Sharmila Tagore	Drama	
Bari Theke Paliye	Ritwik Ghatak	Kali Banerjee, Gyanesh Mukherjee	Drama	
Bicharak	Pravat Mukhopadhyay	Uttam Kumar, Chhabi Biswas	Drama	
Chaowa Pawa	Yatrikof, Tarun Majumdar	Uttam Kumar, Suchitra Sen, Chhabi Biswas	Romance, comedy	
Deep Jwele Jaai	Asit Sen	Suchitra Sen, Basanta Choudhury	Romance, drama	
Gali Theke Rajpath	Prafulla Chakraborty	Uttam Kumar, Sabitri Chatterjee, Chhabi Biswas, Anup Kumar	Drama	
Khelagar	Ajoy Kar	Asitbaran, Shishir Batabyal, Chhabi Biswas		
Indranath Srikanta O Annadadidi	Haridas Bhattacharya	Bikash Roy, Gurudas Banerjee	Drama	
Khaniker Atithi	Tapan Sinha	Ruma Guha Thakurta, Nirmal Kumar, Chhabi Biswas, Tulsi Lahiri	Drama	
Marutirtha Hinglaj	Bikash Roy	Uttam Kumar, Sabitri Chatterjee, Bikash Roy	Drama	
Mriter Martye Agaman	Pashupati Chatterjee	Bhanu Bannerjee, Basabi Nandi, Chhabi Biswas	Fantasy, comedy	
Neel Akasher Neechey	Mrinal Sen	Kali Bannerjee, Manju Dey, Bikash Roy, Smriti Biswas	Drama	
Pushpadhanu	Sushil Majumdar	Bhanu Bannerjee, Tina Barbara, Preeti Bhaduri		
Sagar Sangamey	Debaki Bose	Bharati Debi, Manju Adhikary, Jahar Roy, Nitish Mukhopadhyay		Entered into the 9th Berlin International Film Festival
Sonar Harin	Mangal Chakravarty	Bhanu Bannerjee, Kali Bannerjee, Supriya Choudhury	Drama	
Subha Bibaha	Sombhu Mitra, Amit Mitra	Tripti Mitra, Chhabi Biswas, Karuna Banerjee, Sombhu Mitra	Drama	
