= Miss Priyambada =

- Directed by: Rabi Basu, Dushymanta Choudhuri
- Cinematography: Dushymanta Choudhuri
- Music by: Azad Rahman; Subir Sen; Shankar Bhattacharya (lyrics)
- Distributed by: United Technologies
- Release date: 1967
- Country: India
- Language: Bengali

Miss Priyambada (Bengali: মিস প্রিয়ংবদা) was released on 18 August 1967. This is a Bengali movie starring Bhanu Bandyopadhyay, Jahar Roy, Tarun Kumar and Lili Chakraborty.

== Plot ==
Biltu [বিল্টু](Tarun Kumar) is a very honest, sincere, and energetic young man, who stays at a boarding house Pantha Nibas. Biltu loves Doli [ডলি]. Her maternal uncle is the only guardian. A neighbor of Biltu comes to her uncle and informs that Doli and Biltu like each other. Doli's uncle then decides to arrange her marriage as soon as possible. He contacts his business friend and finalises on the groom, who is one of his friend's son. After hearing this news, Biltu seeks for help from his friends. One of them eventually enters the house as a nurse (with false name Priyambada, played by Bhanu Bandyopadhyay) to take care of Doli and another friend is appointed as the house guard. Meanwhile, Doli's uncle proposes to Miss Priyambada. After some hilarious incidents, Biltu weds Doli and they live happily together.

== Cast ==
- Bhanu Bandyopadhyay
- Jahar Roy
- Tarun Kumar as Biltu
- Lily Chakraborty as Doli
- Tapati Ghosh
- Nripati Chattopadhyay

== Crew ==
- Script, Screenplay, Dialogue: Dushymanta Choudhuri
- Director: Rabi Basu, Dushymanta Choudhuri
- Producer: United Technologies
- Music Director: Subir Sen, Azad Rahman
- Lyrics: Shankar Bhattacharya
- Voice: Manabendra Mukhopadhyay, Arati Mukhopadhyay, Pratima Mukhopadhyay

== Music ==
- "O Shalik Amay De Nare" – Aarti Mukherjee
- "Se Ki Tobe Tumi Ogo" – Manabendra Mukherjee, Aarti Mukherjee

== See also ==
- Bhanu Pelo Lottery
- Golpo Holeo Sotyi
- Ora Thake Odhare
- Sare Chuattor
