= Gali Thekey Rajpath =

1959 Bengali action comedy film by Prafulla Chakraborty

- Directed by: Prafulla Chakraborty
- Screenplay by: Mihir Sen
- Story by: Prafulla Chakraborty
- Produced by: Pradip Maitra
- Starring: Uttam Kumar; Sabitri Chatterjee; Chhabi Biswas; Tulsi Chakraborty; Jahor Roy
- Cinematography: Dinen Gupta
- Edited by: Baidyanath Chatterjee
- Music by: Sudhin Dasgupta
- Production company: Asian Films
- Distributed by: Gita Pictures
- Release date: 17 July 1959
- Country: India
- Language: Bengali

Gali Thekey Rajpath (Bengali pronunciation: [ɡoli tʰeke radʒpotʰ]; transl. From the Alley to the Highway) is a 1959 Indian Bengali-language action comedy film directed by Prafulla Chakraborty. Produced by Pradip Maitra under the banner of Asian Films, the film is an adaptation of Paul Armstrong's play Alias Jimmy Valentine, which itself is based on O. Henry's 1903 short story A Retrieved Reformation. Written by Mihir Sen, it plots a professional burglar's to return to the world of crime upon completing his prison sentence.

The film stars Uttam Kumar and Sabitri Chatterjee in the lead roles, pairing for the eighteenth time. The supporting cast includes Chhabi Biswas, Anup Kumar, Bikash Roy, Tulsi Chakraborty and Jahor Roy, with Helen in a special appearance. Music of the film is composed by Sudhin Dasgupta, while Dinen Gupta and Baidyanath Chatterjee handled its cinematography and editing respectively.

Gali Thekey Rajpath was theatrically released on 17 July 1959 to positive reviews. It emerged as a commercial success at the box-office, and had a spiritual sequel Sakher Chor which released in 1960.

== Plot ==
Raja is a professional burglar who has to serve time in prison for a crime. His closest associate, Bhola waits for him; upon Raja's return from jail, they begin plotting a major heist. One day, a family moves into their neighbourhood. Within just a few days, Raja and Bhola grow quite close to the family. The sole earning member of that family is Mala, a woman who works in theater. Raja conceals his true identity and strives tirelessly to win Mala's affection. Meanwhile, a tout named Govardhan constantly pesters Mala to join the film industry. Raja and Bhola beat him up, fitting lesson and rescue Mala from various perils on several occasions. Subsequently, Raja attempts to swindle a businessman, but an unforeseen turn of events completely alters the trajectory of his life. Eventually, Mala discovers the truth about Raja's past yet accepts him as her life partner. Raja, too, resolves to change his way of life and dedicates himself wholeheartedly to become a good human being. He meets with Mala and on his own behalf, seeks her forgiveness. In this manner, Raja once again regains Mala's love.

== Cast ==
- Uttam Kumar as Raja, a professional burglar
- Sabitri Chatterjee as Mala, a theatre actress
- Anup Kumar as Bhola, Raja's aid
- Chhabi Biswas
- Bikash Roy
- Tulsi Chakraborty
- Jahor Roy
- Chhaya Devi
- Nripati Chatterjee
- Helen

== Soundtrack ==
Gali Thekey Rajpath

Soundtrack album to Gali Thekey Rajpath by Sudhin Dasgupta
- Released: 1959
- Genre: Feature film soundtrack
- Length: 9:43
- Language: Bengali
- Label: Saregama
- Producer: Sudhin Dasgupta

Sudhin Dasgupta chronology
Dak-Harkara (1958)	Gali Thekey Rajpath (1959)	Headmaster (1959)
External audio
- Gali Thekey Rajpath Audio Jukebox on YouTube

Sudhin Dasgupta composed the soundtrack of Gali Thekey Rajpath, in his first collaboration with Kumar. The soundtrack contains three tracks penned by Dasgupta himself, along with Subir Hazra and Nakshal Puri.

In the song "Lag Lag Bhelkir Khela", Manna Dey lend his voice for the first time for Kumar. The song emerged as a chartbuster and their combination became very popular followed by its success.

Track listing
No.	Title	Lyrics	Singer(s)	Length
1.	"Lag Lag Bhelkir Khela"	Subir Hazra	Manna Dey	3:05
2.	"Ke Go Tumi Dakile Amare"	Sudhin Dasgupta	Asha Bhosle	3:12
3.	"Tere Liye Aaya"	Nakshal Puri	Geeta Dutt	3:25
Total length:				9:43
