= Moner Mayur =

1954 film by Sushil Majumdar

- Directed by: Sushil Majumdar
- Story by: Protiva Bose
- Produced by: Rama Chhayachitra Ltd.
- Starring: Uttam Kumar; Bharati Devi; Kanu Banerjee; Tulsi Chakraborty
- Music by: Satyajit Majumdar
- Release date: 1954
- Running time: 102 Min.
- Country: India
- Language: Bengali

Moner Mayur was a Bengali drama film directed by Sushil Majumdar based on a story of Bengali novelist Protiva Bose. This movie was released in 1954 under the banner of Rama Chhayachitra Ltd. The music direction was done by Satyajit Majumdar. This movie stars Uttam Kumar, Bharati Devi, Kanu Banerjee, Tulsi Chakraborty and Bhanu Bannerjee in the lead roles.

== Cast ==
- Uttam Kumar
- Kanu Banerjee
- Tulsi Chakraborty
- Bhanu Bannerjee
- Bikash Roy
- Jahor Roy
- Bharati Devi
- Ajit Chatterjee
- Nripati Chattopadhyay
- Chandrabati Devi
- Krishnadhan Mukherjee
- Suprava Mukherjee
