= Path Bendhe Dilo =

1945 film by Premendra Mitra

Path Bendhe Dilo was a Bengali drama film directed by Premendra Mitra based on his novel. This film was released in 1945 under the banner of Deluxe Pictures.

== Cast ==
- Chhabi Biswas
- Kanan Devi
- Tulsi Chakraborty
- Jahar Ganguly
- Jiben Bose
- Shyam Laha
- Purnima Devi
- Krishnadhan Mukherjee
- Prabha Devi
- Rabi Ray
- Ranjit Roy
