= Ratrir Tapashya =

1952 Bengali film Sushil Majumdar

Ratrir Tapashya is a Bengali drama film directed by Sushil Majumdar, produced by Rama Chayachitra based on a Bengali novel by Gajendra Kumar Mitra. This film was released on 30 May 1952 under the banner of Golden Movie Corporation.

== Plot ==
Bhupen has abrilliant academic career, he works as tuition teacher of a rich man's granddaughter Sandhya. Sandhya develops a romantic feelings for Bhupen but he does not reciprocate and marries Kalyani instead of Sandhya. Devastated by the rejection, Sandhya uses her wealth and social influence to ruin Bhupen's life.

== Cast ==
- Bikash Roy as Bhupen
- Arati Majumdar as Sandhya
- Chhabi Biswas as Sandhya's grandfather
- Chhaya Devi as Nanny
- Jahor Roy
- Bhanu Banerjee
- Tulsi Chakraborty
- Rabi Ghosh
- Tulsi Lahiri
- Kanu Banerjee
- Pranati Ghosh
- Swagata Chakraborty
