= Lakh Taka =

1953 film by Niren Lahiri

- Directed by: Niren Lahiri
- Story by: Niren Lahiri
- Produced by: Satabdi Chitra Pratisthan
- Starring: Bhanu Banerjee; Uttam Kumar; Sabitri Chatterjee; Chhabi Biswas
- Music by: Shyamal Mitra; Niren Lahiri
- Release date: 1 January 1953
- Country: India
- Language: Bengali

Lakh Taka is a Bengali drama film directed by Niren Lahiri, and starring Uttam Kumar, Sabitri Chatterjee, Bhanu Banerjee, Chhabi Biswas and Jahor Roy. The music direction is by Shyamal Mitra and Niren Lahiri. It was released on 1 January 1953 under the banner of Satabdi Chitra Pratisthan.

== Plot ==
The film follows the story of Fakka, also known as Fakkaram, as he embarks on a quest for a substantial inheritance left by a millionaire, accompanied by his beloved family and greedy relatives.

== Cast ==
- Sabitri Chatterjee
- Uttam Kumar
- Bhanu Banerjee
- Chhabi Biswas
- Jahor Roy
- Nripati Chattopadhyay
- Nabadwip Haldar
- Shyam Laha
- Renuka Roy
- Ashu Bose
- Ajit Chatterjee
- Belarani Devi
