= Prafulla Chakraborty =

Indian film director

- Occupation: Director
- Notable work: Jamalaye Jibanta Manush
- Spouse: Sonamani Chakraborty
- Children: Kalpana Chakraborty

Prafulla Chakraborty was an Indian Bengali-language film director. His notable works are Jamalaye Jibanta Manush and Gali Theke Rajpath.

== Filmography ==
Year	Film	Starring	Produced by
1958	Jamalaye Jibanta Manush	Bhanu Bandopadhyay, Jahor Roy, Chhabi Biswas	Ananta Singh
1966	Shesh Tin Din	Sumita Sanyal, Anup Kumar (actor), Geetali Roy	
1959	Gali Thekey Rajpath	Uttam Kumar, Chhabi Biswas, Anup Kumar (actor)	Pradeep Maitra
