= Chirokumar Sabha =

1956 Indian Bengali-language film

Chirakumar Sabha
- Directed by: Debaki Bose
- Written by: Story - Rabindranath Tagore; Dialogues - Debaki Bose
- Screenplay by: Debaki Bose
- Story by: Rabindranath Tagore
- Produced by: Dilip
- Starring: Uttam Kumar; Anita Guha; Ahindra Chowdhury
- Cinematography: Bishu Chakraborty
- Edited by: Gobardhan Adhikari
- Music by: Santosh Sengupta
- Production company: Dilip Pictures
- Distributed by: Deluxe Film Distributors Limited
- Release date: 14 April 1956
- Running time: 149 minutes
- Country: India
- Language: Bengali

Chirakumar Sabha is a 1956 Indian Bengali-language comedy drama film directed by Debaki Bose and produced by Dilip based on Rabindranath Tagore's story. The film stars Uttam Kumar and Anita Guha in the lead roles with Ahindra Chowdhury and others. This film was released on 26 April 1956 in the banner of Dilip Pictures. It's the remake of a Bengali film same name which released on 1932. This film became successful at the box office.

== Plot ==
The story revolves around a group of hardened bachelors who meet regularly, and eventually settle for marriage. Purna is a newcomer to the group of bachelors at Professor Chandra Basu's house. Also attending are three other bachelors Akshay, Bipin, and Shirish. Akshay is ousted from the committee when he gets married. He suggests that all members meet at his place instead. Nirmala, the Professor's daughter also joins the crowd becoming the only female member. Purna is attracted to Nirmala and suggests marriage, which Nirmala refuses. Akshay has three sisters Shailabala a child widow, Nripabala and Nirabala. His mother is busy fixing matches for Nripabala and Nirabala. Finally, the two sisters are matched with Shirish and Bipin, while Nirmala and Purna get together.

== Cast ==
- Uttam Kumar
- Anita Guha
- Ahindra Chowdhury
- Jahar Roy
- Jahar Ganguly
- Tulsi Chakraborty
- Jiben Bose
- Nitish Mukherjee
- Ajit Chatterjee
- Sobha Sen
- Bharati Devi
- Aparna Devi

== Soundtrack ==
Chirakumar Sabha

Soundtrack album by Santosh Sengupta
- Released: 1956
- Recorded: 1955
- Studio: Dilip Pictures
- Length: 21:18
- Label: SA RE GA MA PA
- Producer: Dilip

All lyrics are written by Rabindranath Tagore; all music is composed by Rabindranath Tagore. Music directed by Santosh Sengupta.

Song title
No.	Title	singer(s)	Length
1.	"Aaji Basanta Jagrata Dware"	Hemanta Mukherjee	2:20
2.	"Abhoy Dao To Boli"	Ashoketaru Banerjee	0:50
3.	"Aloke Kusum Na Diyo"	Hemanta Mukherjee	2:30
4.	"Ebar To Joubaner Kache"	Hemanta Mukherjee, Purabi Mukherjee	3:56
5.	"Jete Dao Gelo Jara"	Sandhya Mukherjee	1:41
6.	"Joyjatray Jao Go"	Sandhya Mukherjee	2:06
7.	"Mamo Joubannikunje Gahe Pakhi"	Hemanta Mukherjee, Purabi Mukherjee	1:58
8.	"Mor Bina Uthe Kon Sure Baji"	Sandhya Mukherjee	2:05
9.	"Na Bole Jay Pache Se"	Sandhya Mukherjee	2:05
10.	"Premer Joare Bhasabe Doare"	Hemanta Mukherjee	21:18
Total length:			: 22:08

== Reception ==
This film remembering as one of the best comedy film in early days of golden era. Critics found this as Uttam Kumar one of the best performance in comedy films. His comic timing and execution was lauded praised at that time. This is a remake of 1932 Bengali film same name which was starring Durgadas Bannerjee, Molina Devi and Tinkari Chakraborty. Despite this is over appreciated and become superhit at the box office and ran near of 100 days in theaters.
