= Bou Thakuranir Haat =

1953 film

- Directed by: Naresh Mitra
- Written by: Rabindranath Tagore
- Screenplay by: Naresh Mitra
- Based on: Bou Thakuranir Haat, novel by Rabindranath Tagore
- Produced by: Naresh Mitra; Govinda Ray
- Starring: Uttam Kumar; Pahari Sanyal; Sambhu Mitra; Bhanu Bandyopadhyay; Manju Dey; Naresh Mitra
- Cinematography: Deoji Bhai
- Edited by: Robin Das
- Music by: Dwijen Chowdhury and Rabindranath Tagore
- Production company: Emar Productions
- Distributed by: Sree Bishnu Pictures Limited
- Release date: 1953
- Running time: 126 minutes
- Country: India
- Language: Bengali

Bou Thakuranir Haat is a 1953 Bengali drama film directed by Naresh Mitra based on a novel of Rabindranath Tagore of the same name, published in 1883. This film was released under the banner of Emar Productions. It stars Uttam Kumar, Pahadi Sanyal in the lead with Sambhu Mitra, Bhanu Bandyopadhyay and others. Uttam Kumar learned horse riding and sword fighting for the character.

== Plot ==
The film is based on the real-life story of Jessore Raj Pratapaditya. Pratapaditya is described as an antagonist more than a protagonist in this film.

== Cast ==
- Uttam Kumar
- Pahari Sanyal
- Sambhu Mitra
- Bhanu Bandyopadhyay
- Manju Dey
- Naresh Mitra
- Nitish Mukherjee
- Padma Devi
- Rama Devi

== Soundtrack ==
Bou Thakuranir Haat

Soundtrack album by Dwijen Chowdhury
- Released: 1953
- Recorded: 1952
- Studio: Emar Productions
- Genre: Feature film soundtrack
- Length: 0:18:54
- Label: SA RE GA MA PE
- Producer: Naresh Mitra, Govinda Ray

Lata Mangeshkar sang for the first time in this Bengali film.

Song	Singer
"Amarey Paray Paray"	Hemant Kumar
"Ami Phirbo Na Re"	Hemant Kumar
"Gramchara Oi"	Hemant Kumar
"Kandale Tumi More"	Hemant Kumar
"Hriday Amar Nache Re"	Lata Mangeshkar
"Shawana Gagane Ghor"	Lata Mangeshkar
"Oke Dhorile To"	Pratima Banerjee
