= Abhaya O Srikanta =

- Directed by: Haridas Bhattacharya
- Screenplay by: Haridas Bhattacharya
- Story by: Sarat Chandra Chattopadhyay
- Based on: Srikanta by Sarat Chandra Chattopadhyay
- Produced by: Kanan Devi
- Starring: Mala Sinha; Basanta Choudhury; Bikash Roy; Bhanu Banerjee
- Cinematography: Soumendu Roy
- Edited by: Santosh Ganguly
- Music by: Pabitra Chattopadhyay
- Production company: Sreemati Pictures
- Distributed by: Chandimata Films
- Release date: 27 August 1965
- Running time: 138 minutes
- Country: India
- Language: Bengali

Abhaya O Srikanta is a Bengali drama film directed by Haridas Bhattacharya and produced by Kanan Devi based on characters from Sarat Chandra Chattopadhyay's novel Srikanta. This film was released on 27 August 1965 under the banner of Sreemati Pictures.

== Plot ==
The film revoles with the life of bohemian Srikanta during his travels to Burma. He meets Abhaya, a married woman who is searching her missing husband. Srikanta becomes amazed seeing her spirited and courageous character.

== Cast ==
- Mala Sinha as Abhaya
- Basanta Choudhury as Srikanta
- Bikash Roy as Purna Shome
- Bhanu Banerjee as Nando
- Gita Dey as Tagar Boshtomi
- Jahor Roy as Mess owner
- Dilip Roy as Rohinida
- Haridhan Mukherjee as Manohar Babu
- Bankim Ghosh as Haripada
- Tarun Kumar
- Basabi Nandi
- Satya Bandopadhyay
- Nripati Chattopadhyay
