= Baghini (1968 film) =

1968 Indian Bengali film

- Directed by: Bijay Bose
- Starring: Soumitra Chatterjee; Sandhya Roy; Rabi Ghosh
- Music by: Hemant Kumar; Mukul Dutt
- Release date: 30 August 1968
- Country: India
- Language: Bengali

Baghini is a 1968 Bengali drama film directed by Bijay Bose and produced by Girindra Singha. The movie is based on the novel of the same name by Samaresh Basu. Soumitra Chatterjee stars as the main hero, Chiranjib, and Sandhya Roy plays the film's heroine, Dugga. Jahar Roy plays Dugga's father, a liquor merchant; Rabi Ghosh plays Bhola, the villain. In the end, Bhola is killed by Dugga. She marries Chiranjib before going to jail.

== Cast ==
- Soumitra Chatterjee as Chiranjib
- Sandhya Roy as Dugga
- Rabi Ghosh as Bhola
- Jahor Roy as Dugga's father
- Bhanu Bandopadhyay
- Chhaya Devi
- Basabi Nandi
- Ruma Guha Thakurta
- Bikash Roy
- Raakhee as Rakhee Biswas
- Sukhen Das
- Nimu Bhowmik

== Soundtrack ==
Baghini

Soundtrack album by Hemant Kumar

All lyrics are written by Mukul Dutt; all music is composed by Hemant Kumar

Songs
No.	Title	Playback	Length
1.	"Jodio Rojoni Pohalo"	Lata Mangeshkar
2.	"Mon Niye Ki Morbo"	Asha Bhosle
3.	"O Kokila Tore Shudhai Re"	Manna Dey
4.	"O Radhe Thomke Geli Keno"	Hemant Kumar
5.	"Jokhon Daklo Bashi"	Hemant Kumar as Hemanta Kumar Mukhopadhyay
