= Mriter Martye Agaman =

1959 Indian Bengali film

- Directed by: Pashupati Chatterjee
- Release date: 1959
- Country: India
- Language: Bengali

Mriter Martye Agaman (transl. The Return of The Dead) is a Bengali language fantasy comedy film directed by Pashupati Chatterjee. This film was released in 1959 under the banner of Miracle India Private Limited.

== Plot ==
After going to hell, Bishwanath finds many persons known to him. They plan to team up against Yamraj and escape. Finally, they fly away from hell and land on Earth. They discover that everything has changed. Their relationships, love and affection became irrelevant in their absence. This bitter experience makes them decide to go back to hell.

== Cast ==
- Bhanu Bannerjee as Biswanath
- Basabi Nandi
- Chhabi Biswas
- Tulsi Chakraborty
- Tulsi Lahiri
- Jahar Ganguly
- Jahor Roy
- Amar Mullick
- Tapati Ghosh
- Nitish Mukhopadhyay
- Haradhan Bannerjee
