= Ashite Ashiona =

- Directed by: Shree Jayadrath
- Written by: Shree Jayadrath
- Produced by: Shibprasad Chatterjee; Shanta Ganguly
- Starring: Bhanu Bannerjee; Ruma Guha Thakurta; Rabi Ghosh; Jahor Roy; Kamal Mitra; Asit Baran; Tarun Kumar
- Cinematography: Dinen Gupta
- Edited by: Kamal Ganguly
- Music by: Gopen Mullick
- Production company: Rudrani Films
- Distributed by: Sree Bishnu Pictures
- Release date: 20 January 1967
- Running time: 95 minutes
- Country: India
- Language: Bengali

Ashite Ashiona (stylized as 80'te Ashiona; Bengali pronunciation: [aʃite asiːona]; transl. Don't turn eighty) is a 1967 Indian Bengali-language fantasy comedy film directed by Shree Jayadrath. Produced by Shibprasad Chatterjee and Shanta Ganguly under the banner of Rudrani Films, the film is based on Gour Shee's short story Jajatir Swapno. It stars Bhanu Banerjee as an octogenarian who gets his youth back falling into a pond while travelling, alongside an ensemble cast of Ruma Guha Thakurta, Rabi Ghosh, Jahor Roy, Kamal Mitra, Asit Baran and Tarun Kumar in lead roles.

== Synopsis ==
A neglected octogenarian, Sadananda (played by Bhanu Bandopadhyay) stumbles upon a miraculous discovery. Fed up with the ill-treatment meted out to him and his wife (Ruma Guha Thakurta) by his children, he yearns for an escape from this existence. Accidentally, he finds a solution to all the problems plaguing him in his old-age. He discovers a pond where on taking a dip one can regain his youth. When he transforms into a handsome young man after having taken a dip, many are forced to accept the miracle as real and all hell breaks loose. The plot turns funnier, from a chemist keen to investigate the composition of the pond to his children and their wives changing their attitude towards Sadananda, characters try to make the most of the situation and everything adds up to make Ashite Ashiona an evergreen comedy film in Bengali.

== Cast ==
- Bhanu Bannerjee as Sadananda
- Ruma Guha Thakurta as Saraswati
- Rabi Ghosh as Rabi Ghosh
- Jahor Roy as Badan Chandra Mohanta, Sadananda's servant
- Kamal Mitra as Debesh
- Asit Baran as Ramesh
- Tarun Kumar as Rajesh Roy
