= Bardidi =

Bengali film

- Directed by: Ajoy Kar
- Starring: Sandhyarani; Uttam Kumar; Chhabi Biswas; Chhaya Devi; Manju Dey; Pahari Sanyal; Tulsi Chakraborty; Dhiraj Bhattacharya; Jiben Bose; Anup Kumar; Nripati Chattopadhyay
- Release date: 1957
- Country: India
- Language: Bengali

Bardidi is a Bengali drama film (Note: In 1939 another film was released in the same name based on the same plot, by Amar Mullick.) directed by Ajoy Kar, based on the novel of the same name by Sarat Chandra Chattopadhyay. This film was released in 1957 under the banner of Sarat Banichitra.

== Plot ==
Suren is the son of a zamindar of Bangladesh who lives his life in his own way. He takes up the job of private tutor for a girl whose elder sister is Madhabi, an ill-fated widow. But after a few days, he returns to his rich family and marries. But he cannot forget Madhabi who loves him like an elder and caring sister. In the meantime, when Madhabi's sister-in-law drives her out of the house, Suren hears that and arranges to return the property to her.

== Cast ==
- Sandhyarani as Madhabi aka Bardidi
- Uttam Kumar as Suren
- Chhabi Biswas
- Chhaya Devi
- Manju Dey as Manorama
- Pahari Sanyal as Suren's father
- Tulsi Chakraborty
- Dhiraj Bhattacharya
- Jiben Bose
- Anup Kumar
- Nripati Chattopadhyay
- Dipti Roy as Suren's wife
- Menaka Devi as Bindu
