= Saat Number Kayedi =

1953 film

- Directed by: Sukumar Dasgupta
- Based on: Saat Number Kayedi (Diptendra Sanyal)
- Produced by: S. M. Productions
- Release date: 7 February 1953

Saat Number Kayedi (Prisoner Number Seven) is a Bengali drama film directed by Sukumar Dasgupta based on the same name story of Diptendra Sanyal. This film was released on 7 February 1953 under the banner of S. M. Productions. This was first official debut film of Suchitra Sen.

== Cast ==
- Suchitra Sen
- Chhabi Biswas
- Kamal Mitra
- Molina Devi
- Bhanu Banerjee
- Jahar Ganguly
- Shyam Laha
- Samar Roy
- Kanu Bandopadhyay
- Mihir Bhattacharya
- Probha Debi
- Bijoy Bose
