= Bhanu Pelo Lottery =

1958 film

Bhanu Pelo Lottery (Eng: Bhanu Wins the Lottery) is a 1958 Indian Bengali comedy film produced by Tushar Kanti Ghosh and directed by the MGS Pictures Unit. It starred Bhanu Bandopadhyay, Jahor Roy, Kamal Mitra and Lily Chakraborty. The film had music by Nachiketa Ghosh and lyrics by Gouri Prasanna Majumdar.

== Plot ==
Bhanu Chitrakar (Bhanu Bandopadhyay) is a village-based clay modellist who earns a living selling earthen toys and singing. One day, he is presented a ticket for the Luck Velky Lottery by his Kolkata-based friend Jahar (Jahor Roy), with the first prize for the lottery standing at Rs 395,000. While Bhanu initially refuses to accept the ticket, he is finally coaxed into buying them, and goes to bed with the ticket stuck to his chest expecting the telegram announcing him as the winner to arrive anytime the next morning.

Bhanu receives the telegram informing him that he indeed is the lucky winner of Rs 395,000. With Jahar in tow, he goes to Kolkata to collect his winnings. His awkwardness in the big city leads to innumerable faux pas, and things get more complicated for him when Mini Mitra or Mimi, Jahar's paramour, gives him her undivided attention with the intention of obtaining some of his prize money to forge a film production career for herself. When Jahar finds out that he is being cheated by his best friend, he threatens the latter with a gun. Bhanu escapes, and in the climax of a chase sequence, is shown flying through the air hanging onto a gas balloon, out of reach of his pursuers. The balloon however pops in the end and Bhanu falls straight into the Hooghly river.

At this point, Bhanu wakes up and realises that the entire Kolkata episode has been a dream. Jahar now comes with the news that Bhanu has won the lottery in reality. But horrified at the thought of sexual politics and the loss of his best friend over money, Bhanu now has no desire for the Rs 395,000 and urges Jahar to distribute his winnings among the needy.

== Cast ==
- Bhanu Bandopadhyay as Bhanu Chitrakar
- Jahor Roy as Jahar
- Kuntala Chattopadhyay as Mini Mitra
- Kamal Mitra as Jahar's uncle and Mini's former employer
- Nripati Chattopadhyay as Haladhar Halder

== Soundtrack ==
Bhanu Pelo Lottery

Soundtrack album by Nachiketa Ghosh
- Released: 1958

Nachiketa Ghosh chronology
Indrani (1958)	Bhanu Pelo Lottery (1958)	Bandhu (1958)

All lyrics are written by Gouri Prasanna Majumdar; all music is composed by Nachiketa Ghosh.

Songs
No.	Title	Playback	Length
1.	"Putul Nebe Go"	Shyamal Mitra

== Trivia ==
1. The movie has a unique scene where Bhanu Chitrakar in his dream goes to the Tollygunge movie studios and meets the actor Bhanu Bandopadhyay in person. The two Bhanus are brought face to face, with the same actor playing both the character and himself. When the actor Bhanu meets his doppelganger, he wants to know if the crew has brought him a body double.
2. Bhanu Bandopadhyay and Jahor Roy played different versions of themselves in some other movies like Bhanu Goenda Jahar Assistant. This double-act has parallels in Bollywood in films like Johar Mehmood in Goa, starring I. S. Johar and Mehmood.

== See also ==
- Miss Priyambada `
