= Atal Jaler Ahwan =

1962 Indian Bengali film

- Directed by: Ajoy Kar
- Produced by: RD Bansal and Company
- Starring: Soumitra Chatterjee; Chhaya Devi; Chhabi Biswas; Bhanu Bandyopadhyay
- Music by: Hemanta Mukherjee
- Release date: 1962
- Country: India
- Language: Bengali

Atal Jaler Ahwan is an Indian Bengali drama film directed by Ajoy Kar based on a story of Protiva Bose. This film was released in 1962 under the banner of R. D. Bansal And Company. Hemanata Mukherjee was the music director of the film and Gauriprasanna Mazumdar was the lyricist.

== Plot ==
Sreemonto Choudhury is a successful businessman but is a lonely person living with his only son Jayanta who has just returned from abroad with a degree in engineering. Sreemonto is the victim of orthodox Hindu Bengali custom prevalent in pre-independence Bengal. He has been cast out of the society because he choose the path of Brahmo Dharma. Even his wife left him with the baby Jayanta. His only solace was Anuradha, his only friend and sympathiser. But their budding love could not reach to the marriage as unbeknownst to him, his wife persuaded Anuradha to take an oath of not going any further in this relationship. Anuradha did send Sreemonto back and they have never met again in 22 years until one evening at a railway station. Their short yet nostalgia filled conversation comes to an end as their respective trains arrive and they are heading towards two different directions.

Meanwhile, socially awkward and mentally immature Sabitree meets with an accident while roaming aimlessly on city streets. She has been expelled from her house as she ruined her sister's marriage. As it has been one of Choudhurys' trucks to knock her down, she is admitted in hospital under the guardianship of them and post-discharge Jayanta has to give her shelter in his mansion as Sabitree becomes amnestic due to head trauma. Gradually Sabitree adapts to her new life and takes care of all household activities. The other servants initially sceptic about her, finally beguiled with her kind and caring attitude towards them and takes her as one of the members of the house. Anuradha Devi meets Jayanta and fills the emptiness of his heart with her motherly love. Jayanta, who has been a bit socially awkward and arrogant initially, changes in his mind and becomes jovial, well mannered He makes peace with Anuradha Debi, mends the relationship with his father and starts dating Anuradha's daughter. A few days later, the family physician warns Jayanta about the potential difficulties he may face for keeping Sabitree in his home and that this unknown girl who is taking care of everything may have dishonest motives. Jayanta, now becoming suspicious, behaves rudely with Sabitree and as a result she leaves suddenly. Now Jayanta starts feeling her absence as it grossly affects his daily life. He realises that he actually is in love with her. Tormented within, he arranges for a search but she is nowhere to be found. At last, Anuradha rescues her as she was about to commit suicide by drowning. She realises that Sabitree too is in love with Jayanta. She then takes the active step to prevent the ruining of another potential relationship. At her home, Sabitree and Jayanta reconcile and their marriage is approved by others too.

== Cast ==
- Soumitra Chatterjee as Jayanta
- Chhabi Biswas as Mr. Choudhury
- Chhaya Debi as Anuradha Devi
- Bhanu Bandyopadhyay as Nando
- Jahor Roy as Gopal
- Tandra Burman as Sabitri
- Ranjana Bannerjee as Latika
- Moni Srimani
- Sisir Batabyal]
- Aparna Debi

== Music ==
All songs were written by Gauriprasanna Mazumdar and composed by Hemanta Mukherjee.

- "Bhul Sobi Bhul" - Sujata Chakraborty
- "E Kon Choncholota Jaage" - Hemanta Mukherjee
