= Raat Bhore =

- Film poster
- Directed by: Mrinal Sen
- Screenplay by: Mrinal Sen
- Story by: Swaraj Bandyopadhyay
- Produced by: S. B. Productions
- Starring: Uttam Kumar; Sabitri Chatterjee; Chhabi Biswas; Jahor Roy; Shobha Sen
- Cinematography: Ramananda Sengupta
- Edited by: Ramesh Joshi
- Music by: Salil Chowdhury
- Release date: 21 October 1955 (Kolkata)
- Country: India
- Language: Bengali

Raat Bhore (Note: Spelling according to Mrinal Sen's website) is a 1955 Bengali drama film directed by Mrinal Sen, who also wrote the screenplay. This was Sen's first film.

== Plot ==
A poor village boy's hazardous experience in a rich urban family.

== Cast ==
- Uttam Kumar
- Sabitri Chatterjee
- Chhabi Biswas
- Jahor Roy
- Kali Banerjee
- Chhaya Debi
- Shobha Sen
- Keshto Mukherjee
- Biren Chattopadhyay
- Dhiraj Das
- Swagata Chakarborty
- Debi Neogi
- Mamtaz Ahmed
