= Srikanta (1930 film) =

1930 Bengali film

Srikanta is a Bengali Silent drama film directed by Tarakumar Bhaduri and produced by Radha Film Company based on the novel Srikanta by Sarat Chandra Chattopadhyay. The film was released on 20 December 1930 under the banner of Chitra cinema.

== Plot ==
The film revolves with the adventurous life and emotional experiences of Srikanta, an iconic character of the writer Sarat Chandra Chattopadhyay.

== Cast ==
- Kanti Bandyopadhyay as Srikanta
- Shanta Kumari as Piyari
- Molina Devi
- Radha Rani
- Tarakumar Bhaduri
