= Srikanta (book) =

1917–1933 novel by Sarat Chandra Chattopadhyay

- Author: Sarat Chandra
- Language: Bengali
- Genre: Novel
- Publication date: Part 1: 1917; Part 2: 1918; Part 3: 1927; Part 4: 1933
- Publication place: India
- Text: Srikanta at Wikisource

Srikanta, also spelled Srikanto, is a Bengali novel written by Sarat Chandra Chattopadhyay. Published in four parts between 1917 and 1933, It has been described as Sarat Chandra's 'masterpiece'. The novel takes its title after the name of its protagonist, Srikanta, who lives the life of a wanderer.

== Background ==
In a conversation, Sarat Chandra revealed that the book is partly autobiographical, and his own life experiences provided the basis for the experiences of the protagonist Srikanta; however, he added a caveat:

But they do not follow a common course. Fragments of experience, at different times of my life, have been presented as complete experiences...with the aid of the imagination.

Although not a travelogue, the book is described as involving journeys—both physical and spiritual. On being asked whether he considered Srikanta to be a travelogue, an autobiography, or a novel, Sarat Chandra's reply was: "A collection of scattered memories−nothing else."

== Publication history ==
Children's edition of the Part 1.

Spanned in four parts, Srikanta was written over a period of more than sixteen years. The first three parts, except the last three chapters of third part, were serialized in a monthly magazine Bharatbarsha, under the title Srikantar Bhraman Kahini (lit. The Tale of Srikanta's Wanderings). While the fourth part was serialized in another monthly magazine Bichitra, with a slightly changed name Srikanta Chaturtha Parba. The first three parts of the novel were published as a book, with the modified title, in 1917, 1918 and 1927 respectively. The fourth was published as a book in 1933 with the short title Srikanta, and was acclaimed as the great work of Sarat Chandra.

== Plot ==
Set in sometime between late 19th-century to early 20th century, the story occurs in different regions of British India — Bhagalpur, Patna, Rangoon, Sainthia (Birbhum) and Debanandapur (Hooghly).

Part I

While living in his uncle's house, Srikanta, a boy, one day, meets Indranath, a boy of his age, during a football match and from that time, they become close friends. Srikanta accompanies Indranath in his daring adventures. Indranath loves and helps with money an outcast woman named Annadadidi, wife of a Romani snake-charmer. Srikanta also comes to close to Annadadidi. Meanwhile, Annadadidi's husband dies of snake-bite leaving her alone, one day she disappears from the scene Indranath also goes away one day and is never seen again. In course of time, Srikanta by chance meets a princely friend of his and goes out on a hunting expedition. There in the prince's tent, he meets Piyari, a nautch (dance) girl, who is none other than his old and dear schoolmate. Her real name is Rajlakshmi. She has not forgotten her old love which grows more intense while meeting Srikanta. After leaving the hunting party, Srikanta, the vagabond that he is, joins a group of roving mendicants. During the travelling Srikanta falls ill, and with some difficulty he sends news of his illness to Piyari at Patna, who hurriedly comes with her stepson to him and takes him to Patna. Srikanta spends some days there in the loving care of Piyari, and one day Srikanta takes leave of Piyari and goes to his native village.

Part II

In the second part, Srikanta's voyage to Rangoon (Burma) and his stay there have been narrated in details.

Srikanta gets acquainted with many strange people on board the ship bound for Rangoon, among whom are Abhaya, a young married woman, and her male companion named Rohini. Abhaya was going to Rangoon to live with her husband, but she is treated very inhumanly by her beastly husband and is refused entry into his house. Abhaya and Rohini, who love each other, live together like husband and wife. Srikanta returns to his native village, but is taken ill there. Rajalakshmi comes to him and takes charge of his treatment and nursing.

Part III

Srikanta and Rajalakshmi come to a village in the district of Birbhum. There Rajalakshmi is always busy with her religious practices and discourses. Srikanta is left alone, the rift between them becomes wider.

Part IV

Srikanta thinks of going to Burma again, but by chance he meets his old friend Gahar in his village. Gahar takes him to a Vaishnava Ashram where he meets Kamallata who becomes very intimate with him. At the end, Kamallata leaves the Ashram bidding goodbye to Srikanta.

== Characters ==
The principle characters of the novel are:

- Srikanta — The protagonist
- Indranath — Srikanta's adventurous friend
- Annadadidi — an outcast woman and wife of a snake-charmer
- Rajlakshmi (Pyari Baiji) — a dancer girl in love with Srikanta
- Abhaya — A Rangoon-bound woman whose husband is an employee in Srikanta's office
- Kamallata — a sprightly Vaishnavi
- Gahar — Srikanta's Muslim friend who loves Kamallata
- Ratan — witty and faithful servant of Rajlakshmi

The book features a large number of female characters− most of them based on women Sarat Chandra had known personally. There is Annada Didi, brought up in a conservative middle-class family, who elopes with a snake charmer. Although her husband is a scoundrel, Annada remains loyal to him, for which she is idolized by the young Srikanta. This character is based on a Muslim woman who lived with her snake charmer husband in a village near Sarat's native village. As a child, Sarat would often visit her with his friend Indranath. Indranath is courageous and daredevil who always inspires Sarat. When Annada's husband died, this woman had sold her earrings to the local grocer with instruction that the money obtained be given to Sarat, and soon after that she had left her village permanently.

Another character in the book is Abhaya, who begins a live in relationship with a man in defiance of the existing social norms, after being deserted by her husband. This character is based on a woman Sarat Chandra had known in Rangoon, who lived in a locality inhabited by mechanics and artisans. Her husband would periodically beat this woman, and yet out of a slavish chastity she would not leave him despite there being a man who loved her and who offered to rescue her from her plight. In the book, Sarat Chandra depicts women demanding rights for themselves in their own voice. The protagonist Srikanta has an argument with Abhaya about the propriety of what Abhaya has done; Srikanta argues from the orthodox and traditional point of view, but all his arguments are intelligently demolished by Abhaya.

== Reception ==
Srikanta was translated into English by Sachchidananda Vatsyayan 'Agyeya' in 1944. It was translated into French by J G Delamain (1930), and into Italian by Ferdinando Belloni-Filippi (1925). In 2006, it was translated into Spanish by Gloria Khisha.

== Radio adaptation ==
| Year | Title | Actor portraying Srikanta | Note | Ref. |
|---|---|---|---|---|
| | Srikanta | Nirmal Kumar | | |

== TV adaptation ==
| Year | Title | Actor portraying Srikanta | Note | Ref. |
|---|---|---|---|---|
| 1985-1986 | Srikanta | | | |
| 2022-Present | Srikanto | | | |

== Film adaptation ==
- Srikanta (1930 film) (1930)
- Rajlakshmi O Srikanta (1958)
- Abhaya O Srikanta (1965)
- Rajlakshmi Srikanta (1987)
- Iti Srikanta (2004)
- Indranath Srikanta O Annadadidi (1959)
- Kamallata (1969)
- Under the Gypsy Moon, a stage adaptation by Akash Khurana
- Rajlokhi O Srikanto (2019)
