= Niren Lahiri =

Indian film director (1908–1972)

Niren Lahiri or Nirendranath Lahiri (17 July 1908 – 2 December 1972) was a Bengali and Hindi film director. He received 9th Annual BFJA Awards in 1946 and 2nd National Film Awards in 1955.

== Career ==
Lahiri was born in Kolkata, British India in 1907. His father's name was Jitendra Nath Lahiri. Initially he started his career as an actor in Pramathesh Barua’s studio. He worked with Mr. Barua at New Theatres. He acted in Abhinav in 1940 directed by Debaki Bose. Lahiri was the music director of Ashiana, Tarubala and Annapurnar Mandir in 1936. In 1940 he made his directional debut in the film Byabodhan. He became popular after directing Bhabhi Kaal in 1945. He directed about 27 films including Bengali and Hindi cinema. Lahiri died in 1972.

== Filmography ==
Year	Title	Cast	Ref.
	Raat Dastey		
	Rajdrohi		
	Chhabi		
1957	Indrani		
	Tansen		
	Boro Maa		
	Madhumalati		
	Prithibi Amare Chaay		
	Bhola Master		
	Shankar Narayan Bank		
	Devimalini		
	Jadubhatta		
	Kalyani		
	Shobha		
	Kajari		
	Lakh Taka		
	Palli Samaj		
	Subhadra		
	Garobini		
	Singhadwar		
	Jayjatra		
	Sadharan Meye		
	Arabian Nights		
	Bano Phool		
1945	Bhabikaal		
	Anban		
	Dampati		
	Sahadharmini		
	Garmil		
	Mahakavi Kalidas		
	Byabodhan		
1946	Arabian Nights (1946 film)		
