= Jiben Bose =

Indian actor

Jiben Bose (1915 – 21 March 1975) was a Bengali Indian actor known for his serious-comical side role performances in Bengali cinema.

== Biography ==
Bose was born in 1915 in Calcutta (now Kolkata), British India. He was known mainly for playing supporting roles in Bengali cinemas. Bose started his career in the film Ankjijal in 1932 and performed continuously for five decades in film industry. He worked in a number of movies with leading stars like Uttam Kumar. He died on 21 March 1975 in Kolkata.

== Selected filmography ==
- Duranta Joy
- Biraj Bou
- Deshbandhu Chittaranjan
- Maa O Meye
- Antony Firingee
- Rajdrohi
- Mukhujey Paribar
- Ashanata Ghoorni
- Kinu Gowalar Gali
- Tridhara
- Bipasha
- Kancher Swarga
- Dui Bhai
- Raja-Saja
- Chaowa-Pawa
- Indrani
- Bardidi
- Sesh Paryanta
- Sasibabur Sansar
- Aasite Aasiyo Na
- Kabuliwala
- Sesh Anka
- Chirakumar Sabha
- Trijama
- Ekti Raat
- Sagarika
- Shap Mochan
- Bireswar Vivekananda
- Dashyumohan
- Raikamal
- Jamalaye Jibanta Manush
- Chheley Kaar
- Basu Paribar
- Kankal
- Krishan
- Simantik
- Maryada
- Bandhur Path
- Mantramugdhu
- Path Bendhe Dilo
- Pratikar
- Rani Rasmani
- Sesh Raksha
- Nandita
- Dampati
- Samadhan
- Kavi Joydev
- Nimai Sanyasi
- Parajay
- Parashmoni
- Hal Bangla
- Annapurnar Mandir
- Ankjijal
