= Harjeet =

Harjeet is a common Punjabi given name. Notable persons with that name include:

- Harjeet Atwal (born 1952), Indian Punjabi writer
- Harjeet Brar Bajakhana (1971–1998), Indian kabaddi player
- Harjeet Singh (born 1996), Indian field hockey player
- Harjeet Khanduja (born 1975) - Indian politician
