= Sadanander Mela =

- সদানন্দের মেলা
- Directed by: Sukumar Dasgupta
- Written by: Mani Burma
- Screenplay by: Premendra Mitra
- Starring: Bhanu Banerjee; Chhabi Biswas; Uttam Kumar; Suchitra Sen
- Cinematography: Banku Roy
- Edited by: Biswanath Mitra
- Music by: Kalipada Sen
- Production company: Aurora Film Studios
- Release date: 1954
- Country: India
- Language: Bengali

Sadanander Mela (Bengali: সদানন্দের মেলা; English: The House of Sadananda) is a Bengali-language drama film from 1954, directed by Sukumar Dasgupta. The story is written by Mani Burma and screenplay by Premendra Mitra. The film stars Bhanu Banerjee, Chhabi Biswas, Uttam Kumar, and Suchitra Sen. The music is composed by Kalipada Sen and edited by Biswanath Mitra. Cinematography is by Banku Roy.

== Plot ==
The film is about a few homeless people who take shelter in an empty luxurious house under the leading of a strange man named Sadananda.

== Cast ==
- Bhanu Banerjee
- Kanu Banerjee as Jagadish
- Chhabi Biswas as Sadananda
- Pahari Sanyal as Dakshinaranjan
- Uttam Kumar as Ajit
- Suchitra Sen as Shila

== Soundtrack ==
Sadanander Mela

Soundtrack album by Kalipada Sen
- Released: 1954
- Recorded: 1954

Singles from Sadanander Mela
- 1. "Nai Jodi Keu Sone(নাই যদি কেউ শোনে)" Released: 1954; 2. "Hoi Jodi Borolok (হয় যদি বড়োলোক)" Released: 1954

All lyrics are written by Premendra Mitra; all music is composed by Kalipada Sen.

Track list
| No. | Title | Singer | Length |
|---|---|---|---|
| 1. | "Nai Jodi Keu Sone(নাই যদি কেউ শোনে)" | Pratima Banerjee | 2:16 |
| 2. | "Hoi Jodi Borolok (হয় যদি বড়োলোক)" | Pratima Banerjee | 2:13 |
