= Jiban Trishna =

1957 film

- Directed by: Asit Sen
- Written by: Ashutosh Mukherjee
- Screenplay by: Asit Sen
- Story by: Ashutosh Mukherjee
- Produced by: Rakhal Chandra Saha
- Starring: Chandrabati Devi; Suchitra Sen; Pahari Sanyal; Uttam Kumar; Tarun Kumar; Bikash Roy; Dipti Ray; Jahar Gangopadhyay; Bhanu Bandopadhyay
- Cinematography: Anil Gupta
- Edited by: Tarun Dutta
- Music by: Bhupen Hazarika
- Production company: Badal Pictures
- Distributed by: G.R Pictures
- Release date: 25 December 1957
- Running time: 140 min.
- Country: India
- Language: Bengali

Jiban Trishna (Bengali: জীবন তৃষ্ণা; English: Thirst for Life) is a 1957 Indian Bengali-language drama film directed and screenplay written by the famous director Asit Sen. The story of the film was written by Ashutosh Mukherjee. This film is made under the banner of Badal Pictures. The music of the film is composed by the legendary Bhupen Hazarika. It stars Uttam Kumar, Suchitra Sen, and Bikash Roy in the lead roles. This was the only Asit Sen's film where Uttam Kumar acted. The film became a blockbuster hit at the box office and ran over 70 days in theaters.

== Plot ==
A poor orphan artist Shakuntala (Suchitra Sen) is wooed by a notorious womanizer Rajnath Samanta (Uttam Kumar), only son of a celebrated doctor and millionaire (Pahadi Sanyal). Shakuntala's parents, gave shelter to a woman and an infant male-child. After their death, this boy, Dev Kamal, took responsibility of the girl and took the role of her elder brother. He has a mixed feeling about Rajnath- he hates his millionaire and would do anything, even con-act, to deprive him of it, but as a person he likes him. Shakuntala is indifferent to be associated with him, since she feels in his life there is no 'need' of her. What would happen when the Samanta family mystery unravels and it comes out that Dev Kamal is actually Dr Samanta's biological son, whose wife left with the child? The hating Dev Kamal now wants not a share of, but full property, in exchange of not opening family skeleton. Parallelly runs another sub-plot of Sabita (Deepti Roy) who stays with her FIL (Jahar Ganguly) and small child (Master Shaibal) - whose husband doesn't keep any contact with her or even his father except occasional letters. Why? What went wrong between them? With a hint of tenderness growing between this deserted wife and Dev Kamal. A beautifully crafted story - repeated in a few movies later - in two parts in fact, (Deepti's story is treated as a full movie in a few) but not so poignantly - with all around excellent performance by all, even Bhanu was restrained.

== Cast ==
- Uttam Kumar as Rajnath Samanta
- Bikash Roy as Dev Kamal
- Chandrabati Devi as Suprabha
- Suchitra Sen as Shakuntala
- Pahari Sanyal as Bhavnath Samanta
- Bhanu Bandopadhyay as Bhaskar Das Mullick
- Tarun Kumar as Dev Kamal's friend (bidder)
- Deepti Roy as Savita
- Jahar Ganguly

== Soundtrack ==
Jiban Trishna

Soundtrack album by Bhupen Hazarika
- Released: 1957
- Recorded: 1957
- Studio: Badal Pictures
- Length: 0:13:35
- Label: Angel Digital Pvt Ltd
- Producer: Rakhal Chandra Saha

Bhupen Hazarika chronology
Era Batur Sur (1956)	Jiban Trishna (1957)	Mahut Bandhu Re (1958)

All lyrics are written by Gauriprasanna Mazumder, Pulak Bandyopadhyay, Shyamal Gupta; all music is composed by Bhupen Hazarika.

Songs
No.	Title	Playback	Length
1.	"Phele Asa Pathapane"	Lata Mangeshkar	2:35
2.	"Abar Natun Sokal Hobe"	Utpala Sen	3:13
3.	"Satyam Shibam Sundaram Hey"	Hemanta Mukherjee	4:31
4.	"Kakhono To Hoi Nai Klanta"	Bhupen Hazarika	2:44
Total length:			13:35
