= Shyam Laha =

Indian actor (1911–1973)

- শ্যাম লাহা
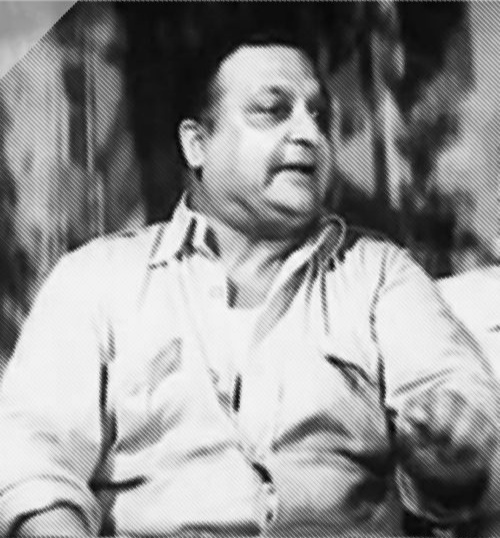
- Born: 26 November 1911; Calcutta, Bengal Presidency, British India
- Died: 25 October 1973 (aged 61); Calcutta, West Bengal, India
- Occupations: Theater Actor, Film actor

Shyam Laha (26 November 1911 – 25 October 1973) was an Indian actor in Bengali and Hindi-language films. He was known for his comic acting.

== Early life ==
Shyam Laha was born Kashinath Shil in 1911 in Kolkata, British India. He passed matriculation from Bangabashi Collegiate School. He was interested in music, playing the tabla.

== Career ==
Actor Pahari Sanyal was impressed by Laha at a function of the Bengali club in Lucknow and introduced him to Bengali actor-director Pramathesh Barua. Laha became popular after acting in Debaki Bose's film Chandidas. He acted in the first animated Bengali film Pear Brothers in 1934. Music director Rai Chand Boral formed his independent MLB production company with Laha. He also appeared in theatres as well as being a radio comic. Laha performed in a comedy duo with another comedian Nabadwip Haldar in various films as a Bengali version of Laurel and Hardy.

== Filmography ==
- Pear Brothers
- Bhagya Chakra
- Dhoop Chhaon
- Pujarin
- Dharti Mata
- Sapera
- Bagha Jatin
- Zindagi
- Milan
- Dampati
- Sahadharmini
- Marutirtha Hinglaj
- Ekti Raat
- Manikjore
- Samadhan
- Aarohi (film)
- Kalo Chhaya
- Noukadubi
- Neelachaley Mahaprabhu
- Niruddesh
- Saat Number Kayedi
- Hanabari
- Uttar Falguni
- Indrani
- Lakh Taka
- Bhanu Goenda Jahar Assistant
- Basanta Bilap
- Deya Neya
- Sharey Chuattar
- Jamalaye Jibanta Manush
- Antony Firingee
- Shriman Prithviraj
