= Rajlakshmi O Srikanta =

1958 Bengali film

- রাজলক্ষ্মী ও শ্রীকান্ত
- Directed by: Haridas Bhattacharya
- Story by: Sarat Chandra Chattopadhyay
- Based on: Shrikanta by Sarat Chandra Chattopadhyay
- Produced by: Kanan Bhattachariya, Kanan Devi
- Starring: Uttam Kumar; Suchitra Sen; Anil Chatterjee; Tulsi Chakraborty
- Cinematography: G.K Mehta
- Edited by: Santosh Ganguly
- Music by: Gyanprakash Ghosh (composer); D. M. Mitholia (lyrics); Gyanprakash Ghosh (lyrics); Shyamal Gupta (lyrics)
- Production company: Srimati Pictures
- Release date: 1958
- Country: India
- Language: Bengali

Rajlakshmi O Srikanta is a 1958 Bengali drama film directed by Haridas Bhattacharya and produced by Kanan Devi based on the iconic and famous novel Srikanta of the legendary Sarat Chandra Chattopadhyay. This film was released in 1958 under the banner of Srimati Pictures. Music direction of the film was done by Jnan Prakash Ghosh.

== Plot ==
Srikanta goes to his friend Mahendra Rao's celebration where he meets Piyari Bai. Although he doesn't recognize her, Piyari knows him well as Srikanta was her childhood love. Piyari Bai reveals the past regarding how she was compelled by the wicked society, coupled with poverty and misfortune, due to which she had to take up this unholy profession.

== Cast ==
- Uttam Kumar as Srikanta
- Suchitra Sen as Rajlakshmi or Piyaribai
- Anil Chatterjee as Mahendra
- Tulsi Chakraborty as Ratan
- Jahor Roy
- Shishir Batabyal as Doctor
- Nripati Chattopadhyay
- Rajlakshmi Devi
- Haridhan Mukherjee
- Santi Bhattacharya
- Dwiju Bhawal

== Music ==
Rajlaxmi O Srikanto

Soundtrack album by Jnan Prokash Ghosh
- Released: 1958
- Recorded: 1957
- Studio: Srimati Pictures
- Length: 0:12:11
- Label: Sa Re Ga Ma Pa
- Producer: Kanan Devi

Jnan Prokash Ghosh chronology
Andhare Alo (1957)	Rajlaxmi O Srikanto (1958)

All lyrics are written by D.M Mitholia, Jnan Prokash Ghosh, Shyamal Gupta; all music is composed by Jnan Prokash Ghosh.

Songs
No.	Title	Playback	Length
1.	"Mero Man Nandlal"	Jnan Prokash Ghosh Krishna Gangopadhyay	6:31
2.	"Aji E Shrabone"	Krishna Gangopadhyay	2:57
3.	"Piyo Na Yeh Pyaala"	Krishna Gangopadhyay	2:43
Total length:			12:11
