= Kankal =

1950 Indian Bengali film

Kankal (transl. The Skeleton) was a Bengali-language psychological horror film directed by Naresh Mitra and produced by Shishir Mallik. This film was released on 14 April 1950 under the banner of Madhuchakra Limited. Kankal was the first horror film released in the Bengali language.

== Plot ==
This is a revenge story of a young woman, Tarala. Tarala enjoys life and she meets a wealthy man Ratan, whom she marries. However, her ex-lover Abhay comes back and ruins Tarala and Ratan's marital relationship. One day drunken Abhay tries to rape Tarala in a farmhouse and accidentally kills her. Tarala's vengeful spirit revives to seek revenge.

== Cast ==
- Dhiraj Bhattacharya as Abhay
- Jiben Bose as Agarwala
- Naresh Mitra as Professor
- Ketaki Dutta as Anima
- Sisir Batabyal as Dr Sanyal
- Paresh Bandyopadhyay as Ratan
- Malaya Sarkar as Tarala
- Prabha Debi as Katyayni
- Kali Sarkar
- Gita Som as Anuradha
