= Bhanu Goenda Jahar Assistant =

1971 Bengali film

- Bhanu Goenda Jahar Assistant poster
- Directed by: Purnendu Roy Chowdhury
- Written by: Pranab Roy
- Produced by: Badalraja Sinha
- Starring: Bhanu Banerjee; Jahor Roy; Subhendu Chatterjee
- Cinematography: Ramananda Sen Gupta
- Edited by: Amiya Mukherjee
- Music by: Shyamal Mitra
- Production company: Joydeep Pictures
- Release date: 1971
- Running time: 107 minutes
- Country: India
- Language: Bengali

Bhanu Goenda Jahar Assistant is an Indian Bengali-language detective comedy film directed by Purnendu Roy Chowdhury and produced by Badalraja Sinha. This film was released in 1971 under the banner of Joydeep Pictures. Shyamal Mitra was the music director of the movie.

== Plot ==
Nupur, daughter of Digambar Chatterjee flees away from her home in Delhi to avoid her marriage. Her father announces a reward of ten thousand for her. Nupur comes to Kolkata and takes shelter in the house of Anjan Mukherjee. Anjan realises her problem and helps her. In the meantime detective duos Bhanu Roy and Jahar Banerjee start searching for Nupur for prize money.

== Cast ==
- Bhanu Banerjee as Bhanu Roy
- Jahor Roy as Jahar Banerjee
- Subhendu Chatterjee as Anjan
- Lily Chakravarty as Nupur
- Pahari Sanyal as Digambar Chatterjee
- Nripati Chattopadhyay
- Shyam Laha
- Bankim Ghosh
- Nilima Chatterjee
- Haridhan Mukherjee
- Biren Chatterjee
- Sailen Gangopadhyay
- Sital Bandyopadhyay

== Soundtrack ==
Music: Shyamal Mitra Lyrics: Pranab Roy

- "Phooler Marshum Chandni" - Sandhya Mukherjee
- "Malatir Kunjabone Bhramarer Gunjarane" - Sandhya Mukherjee
- "Kakhan Ki Hoy" - Shyamal Mitra
- "Dure Jadi Chale Jaai" - Sandhya Mukherjee, Shyamal Mitra
- "Raater Chokhe Ghumer Kajol" - Leena Ghatak, Shyamal Mitra
