= Parash Pathar =

- Poster
- Directed by: Satyajit Ray
- Screenplay by: Satyajit Ray
- Based on: Paras Pathar by Parasuram
- Produced by: Pramod Lahiri
- Starring: Tulsi Chakrabarti; Ranibala Devi; Kali Banerjee; Jahar Roy; Gangapada Basu; Haridhan Mukherjee; Bireswar Sen; Moni Srimani; Chhabi Biswas; Pahari Sanyal
- Cinematography: Subrata Mitra
- Edited by: Dulal Dutta
- Music by: Ravi Shankar
- Release date: 17 January 1958
- Running time: 111 Mins
- Country: India
- Language: Bengali

Parash Pathar (Bengali: পরশ পাথর Porosh Pathor; English: The Philosopher's Stone; French: La Pierre Philosophale) is a 1958 Indian Bengali language fantasy comedy film. It was Satyajit Ray's first film outside of The Apu Trilogy. It was also his first comedy and first magical realist film. Adapted from a short story of the same name by Parasuram (Rajsekhar Basu), the film offered an early glimpse of Ray's sense of humour, centered on a middle-class clerk who accidentally discovers a stone that can turn other objects into gold.

== Plot ==
Paresh Chandra Dutt (Tulsi Chakrabarti), a middle-class bank clerk in Kolkata, reluctantly attends a charity match on a rainy day. At Curzon Park (modern-day Surendranath Park), where the match is to be held, he finds a small, round stone. Thinking it is a marble, he gives it to his nephew. The child discovers that it turns metal into gold (i.e. the philosopher's stone).

Dutt "buys" the stone from the child with sweets after witnessing the stone's power himself. He decides to take a few old cannonballs from the city dump, turn them into gold, and sell them. This scheme makes him rich; as a chauffeur drives him home from the dump, the car pulls into the driveway of a mansion (his new home). He now has a young secretary named Priyatosh Henry Biswas (Kali Banerjee) who, among other things, mentions that Dutt is invited to a cocktail party (his first).

At the party, Dutt acts slightly unnatural before engaging in drunken revelry. When another guest orders him to get out, he turns an iron figurine into gold (thus partially revealing how he became successful). It is not long before this incident is posted as a headline in the papers, causing a panic in Bengal. Paresh Dutt flees with his wife, Giribala (Ranibala Devi), leaving nearly everything (including the stone) with Priyatosh but cautioning him to hand it over if the police arrive.

Soon, Mr. and Mrs. Dutt are taken to a police station for interrogation, and the police discover that the desperate Priyatosh has swallowed the stone. Dr. Nandi (Moni Srimani), a medical specialist, informs the inspector (Haridhan Mukherjee) that Priyatosh is digesting the stone. Soon after Paresh and Giribala Dutt hear of this, they notice the golden objects turning back into iron. The Dutts happily rejoin their servant (Jahar Roy) and Priyatosh.

== Cast ==
- Tulsi Chakrabarti as Paresh Chandra Dutta
- Ranibala as Giribala Dutt (Paresh's wife)
- Kali Banerjee as Priyotosh Henry Biswas (Paresh's personal secretary)
- Jahar Roy as Brajahari, The servant
- Gangapada Basu as Businessman Kachalu
- Haridhan Mukherjee as Police Inspector Chatterjee
- Bireswar Sen as Police Officer
- Moni Srimani as Doctor Nandi
- Chhabi Biswas (Cameo)
- Jahar Ganguli (Cameo)
- Pahari Sanyal (Cameo)
- Kamal Mitra (Cameo)
- Nitish Mukherjee (Cameo)
- Subodh Ganguli (Cameo)
- Tulsi Lahiri (Cameo)
- Amar Mullick (Cameo)
- Chandrabati Devi (Cameo)
- Renuka Roy (Cameo)
- Bharati Devi (Cameo)

== Other credits ==
- Art Direction – Bansi Chandragupta
- Sound Editor – Durgadas Mitra

The credits for Parash Pathar are presented not in Bengali (the language used for credits in almost all of Satyajit Ray's films), not even in English, but in French. (This is probably because Ray's films had begun to be quite popular in France.) For this reason, some DVDs of the film include the title "Parash Pathar (la pierre philosophale)," i.e. the title in Bengali and French, respectively.

This is the first Satyajit Ray film to be released with Chhabi Biswas as an actor. In this film, he is merely one of the several guests at the cocktail party. However, in Ray's next film (Jalsaghar), he has the lead role.

== Critical reception ==
Parash Pathar "would belong among Ray's best work, were it not for some rough edges which betray the speed at which it was shot .... its humour only partly transplants to the west." says Andrew Robinson. Satyajit Ray himself described the film as a "combination of comedy, fantasy, satire, farce and a touch of pathos." The film was entered into the 1958 Cannes Film Festival, where it competed for the Palme d'Or (Best Film).

== Preservation ==
The Academy Film Archive preserved Parash Pathar in 2007.
