= Basabi Nandi =

Indian actress and singer

Basabi Nandi (5 December 1935 – 22 July 2018) was an Indian actress and singer active in the Bengali cinema. She received Best Supporting Actress Award by Bengal Film Journalists' Association for the movie Bon Palashir Padabali in 1974.

== Career ==
Nandi was born in 1935 in British India. Her father B.L. Nandi was a reputed doctor in Dhaka. She completed her schooling from United Missionary Girls High School, Kolkata thereafter passed I.A. from Ashutosh College. Nandi was interested in songs and classical dances since childhood. She learned Bengali songs from Satinath Mukhopadhay and Utpala Sen, and took lessons from Gavindan Kutty. Ananta Singh picked Nandi for his movie Jamalaye Jibanta Manush in 1958 which was a breakthrough in her career. She also acted with Uttam Kumar in a few films. Nandi performed as playback singer and published her own records of music.

== Filmography ==
- Kanchan Mulyo
- Jamalaye Jibanta Manush
- Mriter Martye Agaman
- Abhaya O Srikanta
- Sakher Chor
- Do Dilon Ki Dastaan (Hindi)
- Baghini
- Nabaraag
- Kaya Hiner Kahini
- Bon Palashir Padabali
- Aami Sirajer Begum
- Rodanbhara Basanta
- Sei Chokh
- Rater Kuheli
- Shatru Pakhha
- Gajamukta
- Aami Se O Sakha
