= Kuhelika (1952 film) =

- Directed by: Ramesh Bose
- Music by: Dakshinamohan Thakur
- Production company: Sunshine Productions
- Release date: 1952
- Country: India
- Language: Bengali

Kuhelika is a 1952 Bengali film. The film was directed by Ramesh Bose and was made under the banner of Sunshine Productions. Dakshinamohan Thakur scored the music of the film.

== Cast ==
- Ahindra Choudhury
- Tulsi Chakraborty
- Amar Choudhury
- Santosh Sinha
- Ashu Bose
- Rajlakshmi Debi
- Nani Majumdar
- Bandana Debi
- Debiprasad Chowdhury
- Monika Ghosh
- Sushil Bandyopadhyay
