= Kabuliwala (1957 film) =

- Kabuliwala (1957) cover
- Directed by: Tapan Sinha
- Screenplay by: Tapan Sinha
- Story by: Rabindranath Tagore
- Based on: Kabuliwala by Rabindranath Tagore
- Produced by: Charuchitra
- Starring: Chhabi Biswas; Oindrila Tagore (Tinku); Asha Devi; Radhamohan Bhattacharya; Manju Dey; Jahar Roy; Kali Banerjee; Jiben Bose
- Cinematography: Anil Banerjee
- Edited by: Subodh Ray
- Music by: Pandit Ravi Shankar
- Distributed by: Charuchitra
- Release date: 4 January 1957
- Running time: 116 minutes
- Country: India
- Language: Bengali

Kabuliwala is a 1957 Bengali film directed by Tapan Sinha and based on the eponymous 1892 short story by the Bengali writer Rabindranath Tagore.

== Plot ==
Rahmat (Chhabi Biswas), a middle-age fruit seller from Afghanistan, comes to Calcutta to hawk his merchandise. He befriends a small Bengali girl called Mini (Oindrila Tagore aka Tinku Tagore) who reminds him of his daughter back in Afghanistan. He stays at a boarding house with his countrymen.

One day, Rahmat receives a letter with news of his daughter's illness; he decides to leave for his country. Since he is short of money he sells his goods on credit to increase his business. Later, when he goes to collect his money, one of his customers abuses him. In the fight that ensues, Rahmat warns that he will not tolerate abuse and stabs the guy when he does not stop.

In the court Rahmat's lawyer tries to obfuscate the facts but, in his characteristic and simple fashion, Rahmat states the truth in a matter-of-fact way. The judge, pleased with Rahmat's honesty, gives him 8 years' rigorous imprisonment instead of the death sentence.

On the day of his release he goes to meet Mini and discovers that she has grown up into a 15-year-old girl who is about to get married. Mini does not recognize the aged Rahmat, who realizes that his daughter must have forgotten him, too. Mini's father advises him to go back to his homeland and Mini's mother gives Rahmat the money for travel out of the wedding budget to which Mini agrees; she also sends a gift for Rahmat's daughter.

== Cast ==
- Chhabi Biswas as Rahmat
- Tinku (Oindrila Tagore) as Mini
- Manju Dey as Mini's Mother
- Jiben Bose as Jailor
- Radhamohan Bhattacharya as Mini's Father
- Kali Banerjee as a fellow jailmate
- Jahor Roy as Bhola, the man-servant
- Asha Devi as Maid
- Md Al Amin as Photographer
- Nripati Chatterjee as a borrower

== Production ==
The Afghanistan part in the film was shot in Rajasthan.

== Reception ==
Sameer Ahire of Movie Talkies gave the film 4/5 stars, calling it "one of the most emotionally resonant films in Indian cinema" and writing that "there won’t be a single viewer who doesn't tear up by the end." He praised Chhabi Biswas as "the definitive Kabuliwala on screen" and Oindrila Tagore as "one of the most adorable child actors ever to grace Indian cinema," while commending the screenplay, cinematography, and editing for capturing "the quiet dignity of the story." Ahire also noted that the film's exploration of memory and loss was ahead of its time.

Sankhayan Ghosh of Film Companion described Sinha’s adaptation as "a simple, powerful father-daughter story, but also a story about dispelling xenophobia." He argued that the film "wholly realises" Rahmat’s character who remains "a somewhat distant figure" in Tagore’s original short story and noted that Sinha’s invented opening stretch in Afghanistan (shot in Rajasthan) served as "a template for the Hindi film in 1961 starring Balraj Sahni." Ghosh also highlighted the expanded role of Mini’s mother (Manju Dey), whose suspicion of Rahmat reflects "the fear and prejudices of the average citizen," before her decisive gesture in the climax gives the film its emotional resolution.

== Awards ==
- National Film Awards
  - 1956 – National Film Award for Best Feature Film
  - 1956 – National Film Award for Best Feature Film in Bengali
- Silver Bear Extraordinary Prize of the Jury – 7th Berlin International Film Festival

== See also ==
- Kabuliwala
