= Basu Paribaar (1952 film) =

Basu Poribar
- Directed by: Nirmal Dey
- Screenplay by: Nirmal Dey (Dialogues also)
- Produced by: Tarak Pal
- Starring: Uttam Kumar; Supriya Devi; Sabitri Chatterjee; Pahari Sanyal
- Cinematography: Nirmal Dey
- Edited by: Kali Raha
- Music by: Umapati Seal, Lyricist - Sailen Roy
- Production company: M.P Production Pvt Ltd
- Distributed by: Dlooks Film Distributors Limited
- Release date: 11 April 1952
- Running time: 99 min
- Country: India
- Language: Bengali

Basu Poribar (transl. Bose Family) is a 1952 Bengali film directed by Nirmal Dey under the banner of M.P Productions. Uttam Kumar, Sabitri Chatterjee, Supriya Devi, Bhanu Banerjee and Jiben Bose play lead roles. The film was released on 11 April 1952. It was the debut film of legendary Bengali actress Supriya Devi. It was the first successful film starring Uttam Kumar and it became a superhit at the box office. After seven back to back flop films he was called 'flop master general', and he considered to leave the film industry. The success of this film saved his career. The film was remade in Hindi as Hum Hindustani in 1960.

== Plot ==
Satyen is a very sincere, energetic, honest, and hardworking executive in a private law firm. A cloud of anxiety has covered their family. Only a court order can rescue them from the trouble but, eventually they lose the case. It is a great blow for the whole Basu family. Sukhen (Uttam Kumar) is the elder brother of Satyen and he tries to provide some support to his family. But the entire financial condition of the Basu family is actually getting poorer day by day. In the meantime Achala a modern young lady and the lover of Satyen wants to marry him. Unfortunately Satyen is trapped and convicted for a charge. He does not want to inform his family members. Satyen thinks that his older brother, Sukhen is the culprit, but Sukhen earned money in a legal and honest way; Sukhen is actually a writer. Achintya, a relative of the law firm owner, is the main villain. At last the Basu family stands united and their reputation is restored.

== Cast ==
- Uttam Kumar as Sukhen
- Sabitri Chatterjee as Achala
- Jiben Bose as Achintya
- Pahari Sanyal as Sukhen and Satyen's father
- Supriya Devi as Sukhen and Satyen's young sister(debut film)
- Bhanu Bannerjee
- Manjula Bannerjee
- Naresh Bose
- Rekha Chatterjee
- Dhiraj Das
- Gopal Dey

== Soundtrack ==
Basu Paribar

Soundtrack album by Umapati Seal
- Released: 1952
- Recorded: 1951
- Studio: M.P Production Pvt Ltd
- Genre: Feature film soundtrack
- Length: 0:12:05
- Label: Angel Digital Pvt Ltd
- Producer: Tarak Pal

All lyrics are written by Sailen Roy; all music is composed by Umapati Seal.

Songs
| No. | Title | Playback | Length |
|---|---|---|---|
| 1. | "Ei Hasi Manay Na To" | Shyamal Mitra | 2:52 |
| 2. | "Emon Swapno Kokhono Dekhini" | Haimanti Sukla, Manabendra Mukherjee | 3:24 |
| 3. | "Sharadin Jethay Pakhi Gaan Gay" | Sandhya Mukherjee | 3:24 |
| 4. | "Andharer Kapat Bhenge" | Sachin Gupta | 2:25 |
| Total length: | | | 12:05 |

== Remake ==
The film is remade in Hindi in 1960 as Hum Hindustani. Which is shot in grava color. The film starring Sunil Dutt, Joy Mukherjee, Asha Parekh, Gajanan Jagirdar and Helen.
