= Chhabi Biswas =

Indian actor (1900–1962)

- Born: Sachindranath Biswas; 12 July 1900; Ahiritola, Calcutta, Bengal Presidency, British India
- Died: 11 June 1962 (aged 61); Calcutta, West Bengal, India
- Education: Vidyasagar College
- Occupation: Actor
- Years active: 1931–1962
- Spouse: Samira Bose
- Children: Dilip Biswas (son); Malay Biswas (son); Manjula Biswas (daughter)
- Parent: Bhupatinath Biswas (father)
- Awards: Sangeet Natak Akademi Award (1960)

Chhabi Biswas (Chabi Biśbās; 12 July 1900 – 11 June 1962) was an Indian actor, primarily known for his performances in Tapan Sinha's Kabuliwala and Satyajit Ray's films Jalsaghar (The Music Room, 1958), Devi (The Goddess, 1960) and Kanchenjungha (1962).

He is arguably best remembered for his roles as the quintessential aristocratic patriarch, and was himself the scion of a rich and cultured North Kolkata family. He was born on 12 July 1900. His father, Bhupatinath Biswas, was well known for his charitable works. His first name was Sachindranath, but his mother nicknamed her son Chhabi (a beautiful picture!) and the name stuck throughout his life and career. His portrayal of the formidable father figure, though often typecast, yet was powerful and convincing enough to earn both popular and critical accolades. That portrayal also had cultural significance, as in the British Raj, it enlightened the Bengali to combine both the hoary tradition and the Anglicised urbanity.

== Life and film career ==
Passing his matriculation examinations from the Hindu School, Chhabi Biswas enrolled at the Presidency College and later at the Vidyasagar College. It was during this time that he started working in amateur theatre and got in touch with Sisir Kumar Bhaduri, the legendary star of Bengali theatre. The young actor was impressed by Sisir Kumar’s histrionic abilities and he became heavily involved with several amateur theatrical clubs. His powerful performance as Sri Gouranga in the play Nader Nimai sealed Biswas's popularity among the theatre lovers of the day.

He then took a break from acting and joined an insurance company, and later started a business dealing in jute products. But soon, unable to resist the temptations of the stage, Biswas rejoined the theatre circuit and made his debut as a professional actor in a social-melodrama, Samaj. Even after his success as a film actor Biswas continued his association with the professional stage and Jatra circuit. His performance in major roles in hit plays like Shoroshi (1940), Sita (1940), Kedar Roy (1941) and Shahjehan (1941), made him an admired figure both among the audience and his peers.

In 1936, Biswas made his cinematic debut in a film called Annapurnar Mandir. The film was directed by Tinkari Chakraborty and Biswas played the role of Bishu, the husband of the heroine. Trained in the over-melodramatic acting style of the contemporary Bengali stage, Biswas soon grasped the finer nuances of acting for cinema. He became a regular in films produced by the New Theatres and had major roles in Chokker Bali (1937), Nimai Sannyas (1940) and Pratisruti (1941). He was absolutely marvellous as a 90-year-old ascetic in Debaki Bose's film Nartaki (1940). Ironically, it was the success of his acting in Nartaki that limited his opportunities in lead roles but his reputation as a character actor par excellence was by now firmly in place. Biswas's second innings as an actor began with this film and he almost became an automatic choice as the paterfamilias or the suave noble. Using his perfect English diction to the hilt Biswas (along with Pahadi Sanyal and Bikash Roy to a certain extent) developed a unique way of delivering a dramatic dialogue, first in English, and then after a pause repeating the same in Bengali. Films such as Ashok (1942), Parineeta (1942), Dwanda (1943), Matir Ghar (1944), Dui Purush (1945), Biraj Bou (1946) and Mandana (1950) showcased his talents as an actor of great quality. He also essayed the role of the singing drunken husband of Sumitra Devi's character in Raj Kapoor's Ek Din Ratre (1956), the same character which was essayed by Motilal in its Hindi version Jagte Raho (1956).

In 1958, when Satyajit Ray needed someone to play an aging aristocrat in Jalsaghar, Biswas was an automatic choice. Subsequently, Biswas starred in two more Ray films; Devi (1960) and Kanchenjungha (1962).

Chhabi Biswas died at age 61 in an automobile accident, while he was driving to his ancestral home in Jagulia, on 11 June 1962. Satyajit Ray later wrote, "I doubt if I could ever make the film Jalsaghar without an actor of the calibre of Chhabi Babu... only a genius like him could portray these myriad emotions. Jalsgahar, Devi, Kanchenjunga, were all written with Chhabi Biswas in mind. Ever since he died, I have not written a single middle-aged part that calls for a high degree of professional talent."

== Filmography ==
Year of release	Title	Role	Director	Notes
1936	Annapurnar Mandir	Bishu	Tinkari Chakraborty	
1937	Haranidhi		Tinkari Chakraborty	
1938	Chokher Bali	Bihari	Satu Sen	
1939	Chanakya	Sikandar	Sisir Kumar Bhaduri	
1939	Sharmistha		Naresh Mitra	
1940	Nimai Sanyasi	Nimai	Phani Burma	
1940	Nartaki	Swamiji	Debaki Bose	
1940	Swami Stri		Satu Sen	
1941	Pratisruti	Paritosh	Hemchandra Chunder	
1941	Pratishodh		Sushil Majumdar	
1941	Karnarjun	Karna	Jyotish Bandyopadhyay	
1941	Epar Opar	Ramen	Sukumar Dasgupta	
1941	Banglar Meye		Naresh Mitra	
1942	Jiban Sangini	Naren Choudhury	Gunamaya Bannerjee	
1942	Saugandh		Hemchandra Chunder	
1942	Pashan Devata		Sukumar Dasgupta	
1942	Milan	Paresh	Jyotish Bannerji	
1942	Mahakabi Kalidas		Niren Lahiri	
1942	Garmil	Mukherjee	Niren Lahiri	
1942	Avayer Biye		Sushil Majumdar	
1942	Shodhbodh		Saumyen Mukherji	
1942	Nari		Prafulla Roy	
1942	Bondi		Sailajanand Mukherji	
1942	Parineeta		Pasupati Chatterjee	
1942	Ashok		Ajay Bhattacharya	
1942	Pativrata		Jagadish Chakraborty	
1942	Mahakavi Kalidas		Niren Lahiri	
1943	Dwanda		Hemen Gupta	
1943	Dikshul		Premankur Atorthy	
1943	Devar	Rabin	Jyotish Bannerji	
1943	Dampati		Niren Lahiri	
1943	Nilanguriya		Gunamaya Bannerjee	
1943	Daabi		Dhirendranath Ganguly	
1943	Aleya		Nabendusundar	
1943	Samadhan		Premendra Mitra	
1944	Chhadmabeshi		Ajay Bhattacharya	
1944	Matir Ghar	Alok	Hari Bhanja	
1944	Pratikar		Chhabi Biswas	
1945	Bondita		Hemanta Gupta	
1945	Dui Purush	Nutu Bihari	Subodh Mitra	
1945	Rajlaxmi		Premendra Mitra	
1945	Path Bendhe Dilo		Premendra Mitra	
1945	Sree Durga		Sailajananda Mukherjee	
1945	Raj Lakshmi		Premendra Mitra	
1946	Sangram		Ardhendu Mukherjee	
1946	Tumi Aar Aami		Apurba Kumar Mitra	
1946	Prem Ki Duniya		Jyotish Bannerjee	
1946	Mandir		Phani Burma	
1946	Biraj Bou	Nilambar	Amar Mullick	
1946	Vande Mataram		Sudhirbandhu Bannerjee	
1946	Nibedita		Pratibha Sasmal	
1946	Saat Number Bari		Sukumar Dasgupta	
1947	Chandrasekhar	Chandrasekhar	Debaki Bose	
1947	Abhijog		Sushil Majumdar	
1947	Nurse Sisi		Subodh Mitra	
1948	Anirban		Soumyen Mukherjee	
1948	Shesh Nibedan		Dhirendranath Ganguly	
1948	Sadharan Meye		Niren Lahiri	
1948	Nandaranir Sansar		Surendraranjan Sarkar	
1948	Shankha Sindur		Manujendra Bhanja	
1948	Umar Prem		Khagen Roy	
1948	Drishtidaan		Nitin Bose	
1949	Manzoor		Subodh Mitra	
1949	Debi Chowdhurani		Satish Dangupta	
1949	Jar Jetha Ghar		Chhabi Biswas	
1949	Singhdwar		Niren Lahiri	
1950	Garabini		Niren Lahiri	
1950	Mandanda		Ratan Chatterjee	
1950	Vidyasagar		Kali Prasad Ghose	
1950	Mahasampad		Surendraranjan Sarkar	
1951	Anurag		Jatin Das	
1951	Kalsap		Khagen Roy	
1951	Maldar		Amit Moitra	
1951	Biplabi Kshudiram		Hiranmoy Sen	
1951	Aparajita		Partha Sarathy Drama	
1951	Durgesh Nandini (1951 film)	Katlu Khan	Amar Mullick	
1951	Sunandar Biye		Sudhir Sarkar	
1952	Ratrir Tapashya		Sushil Majumdar	
1952	Krishnakanter Will		Khagen Roy	
1952	Nirakshar		Gunamaya Bannerjee	
1952	Prarthana		Pranab Roy	
1952	Alladdin-o-ashcharya Pradeep		Bijon Sen	
1952	Kar Pape	Kali Prasad Ghose	Dr. Bose	
1952	Jabanbondi		Amar Dutta	
1952	Subhada	Haran Chandra	Niren Lahiri	
1952	Vidyasagar		Kali Prasad Ghose	
1953	Raja Krishnachandra		Sudhirbandhu Bannerjee	
1953	Shesher Kabita	Abanish	Modhu Bose	
1953	Saat Number Kayedi		Sukumar Dasgupta	
1953	Lakh Taka		Niren Lahiri	
1953	Jog Biyog		Pinaki Mukherji	
1953	Boudir Bon		Khagen Roy	
1953	Sabuj Paharh		Apurba Kumar Mitra	
1953	Baimanik		Shyam Chakraborty	
1953	Blind Lane		Sailajananda Mukherjee	
1953	Makarsar Jaal		Pashupati Kundu	
1954	Sati Beula		Sunil Ganguly	
1954	Bidhilipi	Jagadish Babu	Manu Sen	
1954	Sati Beula		Sunil Ganguly	
1954	Shorashi	Jibananda Choudhury	Pasupati Chatterjee	
1954	Sadanander Mela	Mamubhai	Sukumar Dasgupta	
1954	Ora Thake Odhare		Sukumar Dasgupta	
1954	Jadubhatta		Niren Lahiri	
1954	Dhuli		Pinaki Mukherjee	
1954	Chheley Kaar		Chitta Bose	
1954	Bhanga Gora	Jogen	Sushil Majumdar	
1954	Prafulla		Chitta Bose	
1954	Banglar Nari		Sailajananda Mukherjee	
1954	Naa		Tarasankar Bandyopadhyay	
1954	Shobha		Niren Lahiri	
1954	Maa-o-chhele		Gunamaya Bannerjee	
1954	Kalyani		Niren Lahiri	
1955	Sanjher Pradeep		Sudhangsu Mukherjee	
1955	Rani Rashmoni	Rajchandra Das	Kali Prasad Ghose	
1955	Joymakali Boarding		Sadhan Sarkar	
1955	Jharer Pare		Debnarayan Gupta	
1955	Hrad		Ardhendu Sen	
1955	Dasyu Mohan	Mr. Shome	Ardhendu Mukherjee	
1955	Sabar Upare	Prashanta Chatterjee	Agradoot	
1955	Upahar	Sunil's father	Tapan Sinha	
1955	Shribatsa Chinta		Phani Burma	
1955	Prashna	Sumitra's Father	Chandrasekhar Bose	
1955	Debi Malini		Niren Lahiri	
1955	Dattak		Kamal Ganguly	
1955	Kalo Bou		Silpi Sangha	
1955	Katha Kao		Sailajananda Mukherjee	
1955	Pather Sheshey		Ardhendu Chatterjee	
1955	Bhagaban Sree Sree Ramkrishna (Note: Bhagavan Sri Ramakrishna on YouTube; (accessed 30 August 2017))	Mathur	Prafulla Chakraborty	
1955	Drishti		Chitta Bose	
1955	Parishodh		Sukumar Dasgupta	
1955	Joy Maa Kali Boarding		Sadhan Sarkar	
1955	Bratacharini		Kamal Ganguly	
1956	Kirti Garh		Soumyen Mukherjee	
1956	Shankar Narayan Bank		Niren Lahiri	
1956	Asamapta		Ratan Chatterjee	
1956	Madan Mohan		Amal Kumar Bose	
1956	Putrabadhu		Chitta Bose	
1956	Raat Bhore		Mrinal Sen	
1956	Sinthir Sindoor		Ardhendu Sen	
1956	Trijama	Kushal's father	Agradoot	
1956	Suryamukhi		Bikash Ray	
1956	Shubharatri		Sushil Majumdar	
1956	Saheb Bibi Golam	Mejobabu	Kartick Chattopadhyay	
1956	Sadhak Ramprosad		Bangsi Ash	
1956	Paradhin		Modhu Bose	
1956	Daner Maryada	Amarnath	Sushil Majumdar	
1956	Bhola Master	Bhola Master	Niren Lahiri	
1956	Asabarna		Pinaki Mukherjee	
1956	Falgu		Satish Dasgupta	
1956	Rajpath		Gunamaya Bannerjee	
1956	Govindadas		Prafulla Chakraborty	
1956	Mamlar Phal		Pasupati Chatterjee	
1956	Ekdin Ratre		Sombhu Mitra	
1956	Chhaya Sangini		Bidyapati Ghosh	
1956	Taka-ana-pai		Jyotirmoy Roy	
1956	Manraksha		Satish Dasgupta	
1957	Prithibi Amare Chay		Niren Lahiri	
1957	Adarsha Hindu Hotel		Ardhendu Sen	
1957	Khela Bhangar Khela		Ratan Chatterjee	
1957	Harishchandra	Rishi Durbasa	Phani Burma	
1957	Shesh Parichoy		Sushil Majumdar	
1957	Rastar Chhele		Chitta Bose	
1957	Kabuliwala	Rahmat the Kabuliwala	Tapan Sinha	
1957	Kancha-mithey		Jyotirmoy Roy	
1957	Garer Math		Aaj Production Unit	
1957	Pathe Holo Deri	Mallika's father	Agradoot	
1957	Baksiddha		Bireswar Bose	
1957	Antariksha		Rajen Tarafdar	
1957	Abhoyer Biye		Sukumar Dasgupta	
1957	Kari-o-komal		Moni Ghosh	
1957	Bardidi		Ajay Kar	
1957	Abhishek		Chitra Pali	
1957	Tapasi		Chitta Bose	
1957	Madhabir Jonye		Nitin Bose	
1957	Chhaya Path		Gunamaya Bannerjee	
1957	Mathur		Sudhirbandhu Bannerjee	
1957	Ghum		Agrani	
1957	Sandhan		Chitta Sen	
1957	Natun Prabhat		Bikash Ray	
1957	Surer Parashe		Chitta Bose	
1957	Bara Maa		Niren Lahiri	
1957	Ektara		Hiren Bose	
1957	Nilachaley Mahaprabhu	King Gajapati Prataprudradeb	Kartick Chattopadhyay	
1958	Louha-kapat		Tapan Sinha	
1958	Parash Pathar	Guest at Cocktail Party	Satyajit Ray	
1958	Tansen	Akbar	Niren Lahiri	
1958	Nagini Kanyar Kahini		Salil Sen	
1958	Daily Passenger		Sadhan Sarkar	
1958	Daktar Babu		Bishu Dasgupta	
1958	Jalsaghar	Huzur Biswambhar Roy	Satyajit Ray	
1958	Priya		Salil Sen	
1958	Surya Toran		Agradoot	
1958	Marmabani		Sushil Majumdar	
1958	Sadhak Bamakshyapa		Narayan Ghosh (2)	
1958	Jamalaye Jibanta Manush		Prafulla Chakraborty	
1958	Indrani		Niren Lahiri	
1958	Headmaster	Krishna Prasanna (Ex-Head master)	Agragami	
1958	O Amar Desher Mati		Pathikrit	
1958	Nupur		Dilip Nag	
1958	Bandhu		Chitta Bose	
1958	Dhoomketu		Gouranga Prasad Basu	
1959	Derso Khokhar Kando		Kamal Ganguly	
1959	Gali Thekey Rajpath		Prafulla Chakraborty	
1959	Sonar Harin		Mangal Chakraborty	
1959	Shubha Bibaha	Bar-da (Gayatri's father)	Sombhu Mitra	
1959	Sashibabur Sansar		Sudhir Mukherjee	
1959	Mriter Martye Agaman		Pasupati Chatterjee	
1959	Khelaghar		Ajay Kar	
1959	Kshaniker Atithi		Tapan Sinha	
1959	Chaowa Pawa		Tarun Majumdar, Yatrik	
1959	Bicharak		Prabhat Mukherjee	
1959	Chhabi		Niren Lahiri	
1959	Amrapali		Tarasankar Bandyopadhyay	
1959	Nirdharita Silpir Anupastithi Tey		Nirmal Dey	
1959	Rater Andhakare		Agrani	
1959	Thakur Haridas		Gobinda Ray	
1959	Bhranti		Prafulla Chakraborty	
1959	Agnisambhabha		Sushil Majumdar	
1960	Devi	zamindar Kali Kinkar Roy	Satyajit Ray	
1960	Smriti Tuku Thaak	Shova's father	Tarun Majumdar	
1960	Shesh Paryanta		Sudhir Mukherjee	
1960	Tailangaswami		Chitrasarathi	
1960	Shuno Baranari		Ajay Kar	
1960	Raja-saja		Bikash Ray	
1960	Nader Nimai		Bimal Roy Jr.	
1960	Maya Mriga		Chitta Bose	
1960	Kshudhita Pashan		Tapan Sinha	
1960	Hospital		Sushil Majumdar	
1960	Surer Piyasi		Bishu Dasgupta	
1960	Haat Baralei Bandhu		Sukumar Dasgupta	
1960	Gariber Meye		Ardhendu Mukherjee	
1960	Sakher Chor		Prafulla Chakraborty	
1960	Debarshi Narader Sansar		Panchaboot	
1960	Ajana Kahini		Sunil Baran	
1960	Chupi Chupi Ase	Beni (Inspector Ghosh)	Premendra Mitra	
1961	Bishkanya		Shri Jayadratha	
1961	Kanchanmulya		Nirmal Mitra	
1961	Saptapadi	Krishnendu's father	Ajay Kar	
1961	Maa		Chitta Bose	
1961	Manik		Bijoli Baran Sen	
1961	Dainee		Manoj Bhattacharya	
1961	Carey Saheber Munshi		Bikash Ray	
1961	Agni Sanskar		Agradoot	
1961	Madhya Rater Tara		Pinaki Mukherjee	
1961	Madhureno		Shanti Bannerjee	
1961	Kancher Swarga		Tarun Majumdar	
1961	Ashay Bandhinu Ghar		Kanak Mukherjee	
1961	Necklace		Dilip Nag	
1961	Swayambara		Asit Sen	
1962	Mayar Sansar		Kanak Mukherjee	
1962	Bodhu		Bhupen Roy	
1962	Sorry Madam		Dilip Bose	
1962	Kancher Swarga	Judge	Tarun Majumdar	
1962	Kanchenjungha	Indranath Chowdhury	Satyajit Ray	
1962	Agnisikha		Rajen Tarafdar	
1962	Bipasha	Saradindu Chatterjee	Agradoot	
1962	Shubhoddristi		Chitta Bose	
1962	Dhupchhaya		Chitta Bose	
1962	Dada Thakur	Dada Thakur	Sudhir Mukherjee	
1962	Suryasnan		Ajay Kumar	
1962	Atal Jaler Ahwan	Mr. Chowdhury	Ajay Kar	
1962	Shiulibari		Pijush Bose	
1962	Kajal		Sunil Bannerjee	
1963	High Heel		Dilip Bose	
1963	Surya Sikha		Salil Dutta	
1963	Chhakka Panja		Prafulla Roy	
1964	Kantatar		Bireshwar Mukherjee	
1973	Bignam O Bidhata		Bimal Roy Jr.	
1977	Shri Shri Maa Lakshmi		Prabhat Chakraborty	
1982	Agni Sambhaba		Sushil Majumdar	
2007	Bandhu		Chitta Basu	(final film role)

== Awards and recognitions ==
- Sangeet Natak Akademi Award in 1960
