= Dakinir Char =

Bengali language crime thriller film

Dakinir Char (Island of Witch) is a Bengali crime thriller film directed and produced by Premendra Mitra based on the story of Mitra by the same name. This film was released on 28 January 1955 under the banner of Chitrani Films.

== Cast ==
- Dhiraj Bhattacharya
- Jahor Roy
- Namita Singha
- Moni Shrimani
- Sabita Chatterjee
- Ajit Chattopadhyay
- Bipin Mukhopadhyay
- Dhiraj Das
- Bijoy Bose
