= Ora Thake Odhare =

Bengali film

- Directed by: Sukumar Dasgupta
- Screenplay by: Premendra Mitra (lyrics and dialogues also)
- Story by: Premendra Mitra
- Produced by: Sukumar Dasgupta
- Starring: Uttam Kumar; Suchitra Sen; Bhanu Bandopadhyay; Chhabi Biswas
- Cinematography: Banku Roy
- Edited by: Biswanath Mitra
- Music by: Kalipada Sen
- Production company: S.M Productions
- Distributed by: Aurora Film Corporation Release
- Release date: 1954
- Running time: 99 minutes
- Language: Bengali

Ora Thake Odhare (transl. They Live That Side) is a Bengali-language romantic comedy film directed by Sukumar Dasgupta based on a story by Premendra Mitra. This film was released on 5 February 1954 under the banner of S. M. Productions. The music direction was done by Kalipada Sen. The film stars Uttam Kumar, Suchitra Sen, Bhanu Bandopadhyay, Chhabi Biswas and Tulsi Chakraborty.

== Plot ==
This story revolves around the contemporary fights between the bangal and ghoti in 1950s West Bengal. Just after the partition, refugees were coming from east-Pakistan-they are bangal. The old residents of West Bengal are ghatis. Both are Bangali but there are some differences in pronunciations, in culture and also in rituals. Two families start to stay as neighbours. One of them is ghati family, Harimohan is their only casing ? member. He, his wife, son Chanchal and little girl Rini are his family members. In the opposite house, there are Shibadash his wife, son Naru, elder sister Joshoda, Shibadash's brother-in law Nepal and Shibadash's orphan niece Pramila. Chanchal teaches Promila as a private tutor. Naru and Rini play together happily, but the other male members of both the family often fight. They fight for everything, for a football match, for an iron machine or something like that. An affection between Chanchal and Promila grow up. It is revealed to the female members of both family. They agree to settle their marriage. Joshoda comes to propose Harimohan for his son but just before it, Harimohan discovers that he has lost his job. He refuses and misbehaves with Joshoda. Harimohan doesn't find another job, and start borrowing money from Kabuliwallah and from others. A day comes when he has to return all the money which he can't. They plan to escape. Rini learns of it and informs Naru. Shibadash and Nepal start arranging the money for them, and Shibadash's wife gives the money. Harimohan with his family try to escape, but learn that Shibadash and Nepal have already returned all the money. Their relationship takes a new twist. Finally their fight leads to a love affair between two person.

== Cast ==
- Uttam Kumar
- Suchitra Sen
- Bhanu Bandopadhyay
- Tulsi Chakrabarti
- Chhabi Biswas
- Dhiraj Bhattacharya
- Molina Devi
- Panchanan Bhattacharya
- Bijoy Bose
- Anath Chattopadhyay
- Sarat Chattopadhyay

== Soundtrack ==
Ora Thake Odhare

Soundtrack album by Kalipada Sen
- Released: 1954
- Recorded: 1953
- Studio: S.M Productions
- Genre: Feature film soundtrack
- Length: 0:08:18
- Label: Angel Digital Private Limited
- Producer: Sukumar Dasgupta

All lyrics are written by Premendra Mitra; all music is composed by Kalipada Sen.

Songs
| No. | Title | Length |
|---|---|---|
| 1. | "Hello Hello Hello" | 3:15 |
| 2. | "Keno Theke Theke Amar" | 2:57 |
| 3. | "Oi Ashe Oi Ashe Oi" | 3:06 |
| Total length: | | 8:18 |

== Reception ==
The film showed the Bengali's popular fight between Ghoti and Bangal. The Times Of India wrote Sukumar Dasgupta shows the age-old battle between a West Bengali ‘ghoti’ family and a ‘bangal’ family from East Bengal. It deals with the friction between two communities that exists since almost eternity.

The film was a box-office hit and ran for about fifty days in the theaters.
