= Nripati Chattopadhyay =

Bengali actor

Nripati Nath Chattopadhyay
- নৃপতি নাথ চট্টোপাধ্যায়
- Born: 1907; Narayanganj, Bengal Presidency, British India
- Died: 27 May 1975 (aged 67–68); Calcutta, West Bengal, India
- Occupation: Actor
- Parent: Bhupati Chattopadhyay (father)

Nripati Nath Chttopadhyay (Bengali: নৃপতি নাথ চট্টোপাধ্যায়; born 1907 – 27 May 1975) was a Bengali actor, known for his role in Teen Kanya (1961), Bhanu Pelo Lottery (1958) and Dui Bari (1963). He died on 27 May 1975 in India.

== Early life ==
Nripati Chattopadhyay was born in British India at Narayanganj, Dhaka, Bangladesh. His father's name was Bhupati Chattopadhyay. His nickname was Prahu. Chatterjee completed his schooling from Narayanganj High School. His first film was Dipantar.

== Filmography ==
- Punyananda
- Muktisnan (1937)
- Rikta (1939) as Chiranjit
- Nimai Sanyasi (1940) as Lambodar
- Byabadhan (1940) as Mr. Dutta
- Kavi Joydev (1941)
- Epar Opar(1941) as Pandit
- Milan (1942) as Patient
- Avayer Biye (1942)
- Priya Bandhabi (1943)
- Devar (1943)
- Dampati (1943)
- Chhadmabeshi (1944)
- Bideshini (1944)
- Sandhi (1944)
- Kato Door (1945)
- Bhabhi Kaal (1945)
- Mandir (1946)
- Dhatri Debata (1948)
- Banchita (1948)
- Niruddesh (1949)
- Debi Chowdhurani (1949 film)
- Kavi (1949)
- Maryada (1950 film)
- Mejdidi (1950)
- Digbhranta (1950)
- Darpachurna (1952)
- Lakh Taka (1953)
- Jog Biyog (1953)
- Naramedh Yagna (1954)
- Bidhilipi (1954)
- Sadanander Mela (1954)
- Moner Mayur (1954)
- Grihapravesh (1954)
- Moyla Kagaj (1954)
- Dukhir Imaan (1954)
- Bhangagara (1954) Nilamoni's father (Pratibha's brother in law)
- Upahar (1955)
- Shreebatsa Chinta (1955)
- Shap Mochan (1955)
- Sajghar (1955)
- Du-janay (1955)
- Aparadhi (1955)
- Saheb Bibi Golam (1956)
- Subhalagna (1956)
- Daner Maryada (1956) as Servant
- Harjit (1957)
- Punar Milan (1957)
- Kabuliwala (1957)
- Bhanu Pelo Lottery (1958) as Haladhar Halder
- Jamalaye Jibanta Manush (1958)
- Rajlakshmi O Srikanta (1958)
- Bari Theke Paliye (1958) as Feriwala
- Lukochuri (1958)
- Janmantar (1959)
- Derso Khokhar Kando (1959)
- Gali Theke Rajpath (1959)
- Agnisambhabha (1959)
- Personal Assistant (1959)
- Pushpadhanu (1959)
- Prabesh Nishedh (1960)
- Suno Baranari (1960)
- Raja-Saja (1960)
- Maya Mriga (1960)
- Bishey (segment "Postmaster")
- Teen Kanya (1961)
- Kathin Maya (1961)
- Maa (1961)
- Sathi Hara (1961)
- Deya Neya (1963)
- Dui Bari (1963)
- Hasi Shudhu Hasi Noy (1963)
- Abhaya O Srikanta (1965)
- Ghoom Bhangar Gaan (1965)
- Miss Priyambada (1967)
- Antony Firingee (1967)
- Nayika Sangbad (1967)
- Chiriyakhana (1967)
- Baluchari (1968)
- Kokhono Megh (1968)
- Apanjan (1968)
- Adyshakti Mahamaya (1968)
- Goopy Gyne Bagha Byne (1969)
- Nishi Padma (1970)
- Ae Korechho Bhalo (1970)
- Bibaha Bibhrat (1971)
- Bhanu Goenda Jahar Assistant (1971)
- Dhanyee Meye (1971)
- Biraj Bahu (as Nripati) (1972)
- Sesh Parba (1972)
- Padi Pishir Barmi Baksha (1972)
- Natun Diner Alo (1973)
- Bindur Chheley (1973)
- Mouchak (1974)
- Debi Chowdhurani (1974)
- Bisarjan (1974)
- Raag Anurag (1975)
- Mohunbaganer Meye (1976)
- Sabyasachi (film) (1977)
