= Naresh Mitra =

Indian actor and film director (1888–1968)

- নরেশ মিত্র
- Born: 18 May 1888; Agartala, British India
- Died: 1968 (aged 79–80); Calcutta, India
- Education: Calcutta University
- Occupation: Film director

Naresh Mitra (18 May 1888 – 1968) was a Bengali actor, director and screenwriter.

== Career ==
Naresh Mitra was born in 1888 in Agartala, Tripura, British India. He studied law from the University of Calcutta. He started his acting career in 1922 in Minerva Theatre. In 1923, Mitra joined Star Theatre in Kolkata and starred in several plays mostly in the role of anti hero. He worked and acted in number of films of Taj Mahal company, East India Film and Kali Films. Mitra directed Devdas in silent version produced by Eastern Film Syndicate in 1928. This is the first film adaptation of Devdas, the novel of Sharatchandra Chattopadhyay. He directed few films starring Uttam Kumar such as Bou Thakuranir Haat, Annapurnar Mandir. Mitra was also associated with the Bengali folk Jatra.

== Direction ==
- Andhare Alo
- Chandranath
- Devdas
- Gora
- Kankal
- Bou Thakuranir Haat
- Annapurnar Mandir
- Kalindi
