= Jamalaye Jibanta Manush =

1958 film by Prafulla Chakraborty

- Theatrical poster
- Directed by: Prafulla Chakraborty
- Screenplay by: Anil Kumar Bar
- Based on: Jamalaye Jibanta Manush by Dinabandhu Mitra
- Produced by: Ananta Singh
- Production company: Rajkumari Chitramandir
- Release date: 1958
- Country: India
- Language: Bengali

Jamalaye Jibanta Manush (transl. An alive man in the abode of Yama) is a 1958 Indian Bengali-language fantasy action comedy film directed by Prafulla Chakraborty and produced by Ananta Singh, member of Chittagong armoury raid. This film, based on the novel of Dinabandhu Mitra of the same name, was released in 1958 under the banner of Rajkumari Chitramandir. It was remade in 1960 as Devanthakudu in Telugu and in Tamil as Naan Kanda Sorgam by C. Pullayya.

In the film, a wealthy girl commits suicide after her father orders his henchmen to murder her boyfriend. The boyfriend enters the afterlife and the realm of hell while still alive, but he manages to depose the god of death Yamraj and to chase him out of hell. Vishnu agrees to restore the boy and his lover back to life, and then returns the young couple to planet Earth.

== Plot ==
Village boy Siddheswar (alias Sidhu) loves Madhuri, the daughter of Harinarayan. Harinarayan, the rich village headman, will never accept Sidhu as a son-in-law. When they decide to marry, Hari sends some henchmen who almost murder Sidhu. Shocked, Madhuri commits suicide and Sidhu is mistakenly sent to hell while he is still alive. He starts a revolution in hell and heaven, and chases the Hindu God of Death, Yamraj and Chitragupta out of hell with the help of his dead pet bull. He eradicates outdated rules and norms that were framed by Yamraj, and his head clerk Chitragupta, while Bichitragupta assists him. Thereafter, Vishnu and Lakshmi come to Sidhu and Vishnu blesses him and returns him back to Earth with his beloved Madhuri. Hari accepts them gladly.

== Cast ==
- Bhanu Banerjee as Sidhu
- Basabi Nandi as Madhuri
- Chhabi Biswas as Harinarayan
- Pahari Sanyal
- Kamal Mitra as Yamraj
- Tulsi Chakraborty as Nandi
- Jahor Roy as Bichitragupta
- Haridhan Mukherjee
- Shyam Laha
- Nripati Chattopadhyay as Bhringi
- JIben Bose as Lalu
- Aparna Devi
- Ajit Chatterjee
- Suvojit Saha as Gamer
