= Annapurnar Mandir =

- Directed by: Naresh Mitra
- Written by: Nirupama Devi
- Screenplay by: Naresh Mitra
- Based on: Annapurnar Mandir novel by Nirupama Devi
- Produced by: Naresh Mitra, Govinda Ray
- Starring: Suchitra Sen; Uttam Kumar
- Cinematography: Bishu Chakraborty
- Edited by: Robin Das
- Production company: Chitra Mandir
- Distributed by: Kalpana Movies Limited
- Release date: 6 August 1954
- Running time: 136 minutes
- Country: India
- Language: Bengali

Annapurnar Mandir (transl. Temple of Annapurna) is a Bengali social drama film directed by Naresh Mitra based on the novel of the same name by Nirupama Devi. This film was released on 6 August 1954 under the banner of Chitra Mandir and received 2nd National Film Awards in 1954. Uttam Kumar and Sabitri Chaterjee starred in the lead roles, with Suchitra Sen in a supporting role. This film had no music and it was Uttam Kumar's first film to win a National Award.

== Plot ==
Ramshankar is a poor man who lives with his two daughters. His elder daughter loves a young man but he arranges her marriage with an old man who offers a huge dowry. Soon she returns home as a widow and, driven by societal stigma, she commits suicide.

== Cast ==
- Uttam Kumar
- Suchitra Sen
- Sabitri Chatterjee
- Shobha Sen
- Anup Kumar
- Naresh Mitra
- Tulsi Chakraborty
- Jiben Bose
- Molina Devi
- Mihir Bhattacharya
- Nibhanani Debi
- Tara Bhaduri
- Mita Chatterjee

== Reception ==
This is the only film where Uttam Kumar and Sabitri Chatterjee played lead roles with Suchitra sen in a supporting role.

== Award ==
National Film Award
- 1955 : Certificate of Merit Third best feature film in Bengali (Won)
