= Bhanu Banerjee =

Indian actor

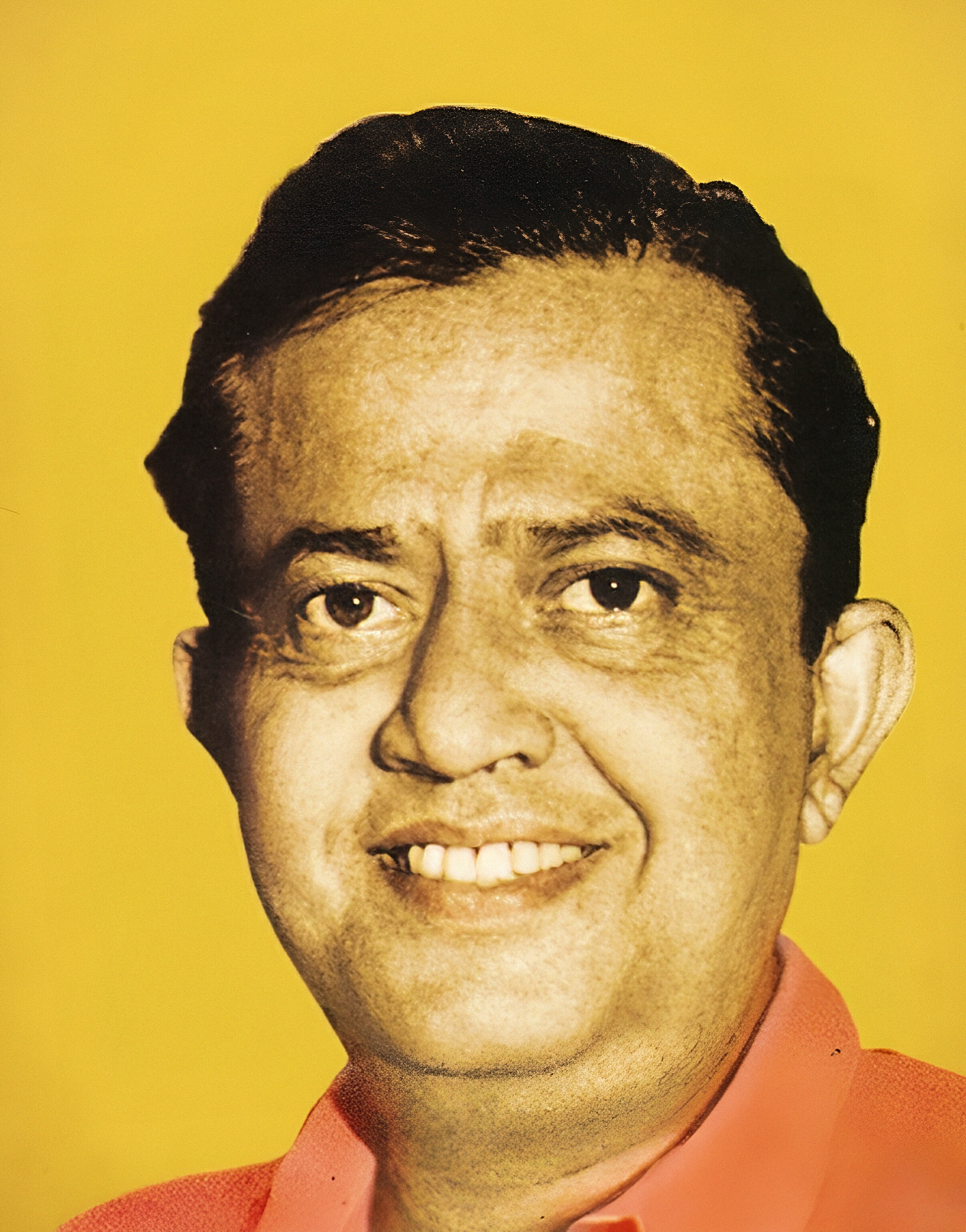
- Bhanu Bandyopadhyay
- Born: Samyamoy Banerjee; 26 August 1920; Bikrampur, Dacca, Bengal, British India
- Died: 4 March 1983 (aged 62); Calcutta, West Bengal, India
- Occupations: Actor, voice actor, comedian, singer
- Years active: 1928–1983
- Spouse: Nilima Mukherjee (m. 1946)
- Children: 3
- Parents: Jitendranath Banerjee (father); Suniti Banerjee (mother)

Bhanu Banerjee, also known as Bhanu Bandyopadhyay (born as Samyamoy Banerjee; 26 August 1920 – 4 March 1983), was an Indian Independence activist, and actor, known for his work in Bengali cinema. He acted in over 300 movies and numerous plays, and performed frequently on the radio.

== Early life ==
Bhanu Banerjee was born on 26 August 1920 at Dhaka, Bengal into a Kulin Brahmin family. His ancestral home was at a village called Panchgaon in Bikrampur, Dhaka Division, present day Bangladesh. Bhanu Banerjee was related to Sabitri Chatterjee through his maternal side. Aghorenath Chattopadhyay was his maternal grandfather's cousin. He studied at Kazir Pagla A. T. Institute, Lohajong, Pogose School and St. Gregory's High School in Dhaka followed by Jagannath College for his B.A. He then moved to Calcutta in 1941. In his initial years, Bandyopadhyay worked at the Iron & Steel Control Board.

== Political activity ==
He was associated with the freedom fighter group Anushilan Samity in the Dhaka District. As a teenager, he was kept under house arrest for 30 days because the police suspected him of involvement in seditious activities. Following the Quit India movement, he joined the Revolutionary Socialist Party. He later founded the Kranti Shilpi Sangha with writer and filmmaker Salil Sen, staging Sen's landmark play Natun Yahudi (1951, filmed 1953) to raise funds for East Bengal refugees in Calcutta.

== Career ==
Bandyopadhyay started his acting career as a stand-up comedian in Dhaka. He performed at office parties and then moved on to larger venues. In 1943, he released his first major comic gramophone record Dhakar Gadoane. Its success prompted him to release a new record every year during Durga Puja. He made his big screen debut with Devi Mukherjee and Sumitra Devi starrer Bengali film Abhijog (1947). Bandyopadhyay's breakthrough film role was in Nirmal Dey's Basu Parivar (1952) where he played a Bangal businessman. The next year his role as Kedar in Sharey Chuattar made him rise to fame. His line in the film, "Mashima, malpoa khamu" (Aunty, I want to eat malpoa), became a highly popular catchphrase.

He went on to act in over 300 movies like Bhranti Bilash and Pasher Bari. In most of his films he played comedic roles in which he exaggerated Bengali accents and mannerisms for comic effect. He teamed up with his best friend comedian Jahor Roy for many films like Bhanu Pelo Lottery and the humorous detective story Bhanu Goenda Jahar Assistant. Typically, in the pair's films Bandyopadhyay would take the role of the Bangal and Roy would be the comical Ghoti character (although in real life, both were Bangals). Although chiefly known as a comedian, Bandyopadhyay has played serious roles films like Galpo Holeo Satti, Alor Pipasa, Amrita Kumbher Sandhane; Nirdharito Shilpir Onuposthitite, and even negative roles in Baghini and Bijayinee. He played the lead role in many films including Jamalaye Jibanta Manush, Mriter Martye Agaman, Sworgo Mortyo, Personal Assistant, Miss Priyambada and Ashite Ashiona. Later in his career Bandyopadhyay founded his own Jatra group called Mukto Mancha. He produced, directed and acted in his own productions, traveling around the country with the troupe.

== Personal life ==
Banerjee was married to Nilima Mukherjee, a playback singer. They had three children – Basabi Ghatak (née Banerjee), Gautam and Pinaki. Earlier the family stayed in Jubilee Park, Tollygunge. They later shifted to 42A, Charu Avenue, Rabindra Sarobar in 1960.

== Death and legacy ==
Banerjee died of a heart-related illness on 4 March 1983. On 26 August 2011 his film Nirdharito Shilpir Onupasthitite (1959) was released on DVD. His son, Gautam Banerjee, has confirmed the release which coincided with his father's 91st birth anniversary.

== Works ==
=== Filmography ===
| Year | Title | Role | Notes |
|---|---|---|---|
| 1928 | Nishiddha Phal | | |
| 1930 | Kal Parinaya | | |
| 1931 | Aparadhi | | |
| 1931 | Dena Paona | Nirmal | |
| 1931 | Chasher Meye | | |
| 1932 | Sandigdha | | |
| 1937 | Didi | Mr. Banerjee | |
| 1938 | Abhigyan | Suresh | |
| 1938 | Street Singer | | |
| 1939 | Rajat Jayanti | Samirkanti | |
| 1939 | Rikta | Sadhan | |
| 1939 | Bardidi | Manorama's husband | |
| 1939 | Parajay | Dilip | |
| 1940 | Nartaki | Satyasundar | |
| 1943 | Jogajog | Doctor | |
| 1945 | Bhabhi Kaal | | |
| 1947 | Jagaran | | |
| 1947 | Abhijog | | |
| 1948 | Sharbohara | | |
| 1949 | Bandhur Path | | |
| 1949 | Mantramugdha | | |
| 1949 | Ja Hoi Na | | |
| 1950 | Mandando | | |
| 1950 | Tothapi | | |
| 1950 | Sahodar | | |
| 1950 | Digbhranta | | |
| 1950 | Krishan | | |
| 1950 | Dwairath | | |
| 1951 | Barjatri | | |
| 1951 | Niyoti | | |
| 1951 | Rupantar | | |
| 1951 | Shetu | | |
| 1952 | Pasher Bari | Shyam Sundar Babu | |
| 1952 | Basu Paribar | | |
| 1952 | Mahishashur Badh | | |
| 1952 | Aladin O Ascharya Pradip | | |
| 1952 | Kapalkundala | | |
| 1952 | Jabanbondi | | |
| 1952 | Darpachurna | | |
| 1952 | Patri Chai | | |
| 1952 | Prarthana | | |
| 1952 | Ratrir Tapashya | | |
| 1953 | Sharey Chuattor | Kedar | |
| 1953 | Rami Chandidash | | |
| 1953 | Lakh Taka | | |
| 1953 | Bana Hansi | | |
| 1953 | Sat Number Kayedi | | |
| 1953 | Natun Ihudi | | |
| 1953 | Shashurbari | | |
| 1953 | Keranir Jiban | | |
| 1953 | Adrishya Manush | | |
| 1953 | Pathnirdesh | | |
| 1953 | Banhangshi | | |
| 1953 | Bastab | | |
| 1953 | Bouthakuranir Hut | | |
| 1953 | Boudir Bon | | |
| 1953 | Maharaja Nandakumar | | |
| 1953 | Rakhi | | |
| 1953 | Harilakhhi | | |
| 1954 | Atom Bomb | | |
| 1954 | Nil Shari | | |
| 1954 | Grihaprabesh | | |
| 1954 | Mantra Shakti | | |
| 1954 | Maner Mayur | | |
| 1954 | Ora Thake Odhare | | |
| 1954 | Sadanander Mela | | |
| 1954 | Chhele Kar | Monty | |
| 1954 | Jaidev | Guard | |
| 1954 | Bhangagara | Nilamoni (Pratibha's nephew in law) | |
| 1954 | Dukhhir Iman | | |
| 1954 | Boloygrash | | |
| 1954 | Satir Dehatyag | | |
| 1954 | Kalyani | | |
| 1954 | Jagrihi | | |
| 1954 | Barbella | | |
| 1954 | Bikram Urbashi | | |
| 1954 | Mani ar Manik | | |
| 1954 | Moroner Pore | | |
| 1954 | Ladies Seat | | |
| 1955 | Sanjher Pradip | | |
| 1955 | Rani Rasmani | | |
| 1955 | Joi Ma Kali Boarding | | |
| 1955 | Bandish | | Hindi |
| 1955 | Nishidhha Fall | | |
| 1955 | Shreebatsa Chinta | | |
| 1955 | Sajghor | | |
| 1955 | Aparadhi | | |
| 1955 | Ardhangini | | |
| 1955 | Atmadarshan | | |
| 1955 | Chattujjay Barujjay | | |
| 1955 | Chhoto Bou | | |
| 1955 | Jyotishi | | |
| 1955 | Dashyu Mohan | | |
| 1955 | Durlav Janam | | |
| 1955 | Devi malini | | |
| 1955 | Bir Hambir | | |
| 1955 | Bratacharini | | |
| 1955 | Bhalobasha | | |
| 1956 | Tonsil | | |
| 1956 | Ekti Raat | Chhakubabu | |
| 1956 | Asomapta | | |
| 1956 | Amar Bou | | |
| 1956 | Shaheb Bibi Gholam | | |
| 1956 | Daner Marjada | Boy | |
| 1956 | Shuvoratri | | |
| 1956 | Suryamukhi | | |
| 1956 | Gobindadas | | |
| 1956 | Taka Ana Pai | | |
| 1956 | Mahanisha | | |
| 1956 | Bhadurymoshai | | |
| 1956 | Mamlar Fall | | |
| 1956 | Lakhhahira | | |
| 1956 | Shabdhan | | |
| 1957 | Khela Bhangar Khela | | |
| 1957 | Kanchamithe | | |
| 1957 | Ogo Shunchho | | |
| 1957 | Jiban Trishna | Bhaskar Das Mallik | |
| 1957 | Nilachaley Mahaprabhu | | |
| 1957 | Andhare Alo | | |
| 1957 | Ektara | | |
| 1957 | Ek Gaon Ki Kahani | | Hindi |
| 1957 | Ghum | | |
| 1957 | Natun Prabhat | | |
| 1957 | Bashantabahar | | |
| 1957 | Baroma | | |
| 1957 | Madhumalati | | |
| 1957 | Shesh Parichoy | | |
| 1957 | Srimatir Shangshar | | |
| 1958 | Louhakapat | | |
| 1958 | Kalamati | | |
| 1958 | Suryatoron | | |
| 1958 | Manmoyee Girls School | | |
| 1958 | Jamalaye Jibanta Manush | Sidhu | |
| 1958 | Bhanu Pelo Lottery | Bhanu Chitrakar | |
| 1958 | Shargo marto | | |
| 1958 | Jonakir Alo | | |
| 1958 | Daktarbabu | | |
| 1958 | Nupur | | |
| 1959 | Sonar Horin | | |
| 1959 | Personal Assistant | Rama Gupta | |
| 1959 | Nirdharito Shilpir Anupasthite | | |
| 1959 | Pushpadhanu | | |
| 1959 | Nauka Bilash | | |
| 1959 | Mriter Martye Agaman | | |
| 1960 | Shaharer Itikatha | | |
| 1960 | Hospital | | |
| 1960 | Shesh Parjanto | | |
| 1960 | Shokher Chor | | |
| 1960 | Surer Piyashi | | |
| 1961 | Mr and Mrs Chowdhury | | |
| 1961 | Bishkanya | | |
| 1961 | Kathin Maya | | |
| 1961 | Kanchanmulya | | |
| 1961 | Aaj Kal Parshu | | |
| 1961 | Kanamachhi | | |
| 1961 | Roybahadur | | |
| 1961 | Shayombara | | |
| 1962 | Mayar Shangshar | | |
| 1962 | Badhu | | |
| 1962 | Agnishikha | | |
| 1962 | Abhisharika | | |
| 1962 | Atal Jaler Ahwan | Nanda | |
| 1962 | Dadathakur | | |
| 1963 | Akash Pradip | | |
| 1963 | Dui Bari | | |
| 1963 | Barnochora | | |
| 1963 | Satbhai | | |
| 1963 | High Heel | | |
| 1963 | Dui Nari | | |
| 1963 | Hashi Shudhu hashi Noi | | |
| 1963 | Preyashi | | |
| 1963 | Chhayasurya | | |
| 1963 | Bhranti Bilas | Shakti Kinkar and Bhakti Kinkar | |
| 1964 | Jiban Kahini | | |
| 1964 | Bingshati Janani | | |
| 1964 | Dip Neve Nai | | |
| 1965 | Alor Pipasha | | |
| 1965 | Mahalogno | | |
| 1965 | Etotuku Basha | | |
| 1965 | Rajkanya | | |
| 1965 | Abhaya O Srikanta | Nanda Mistry | |
| 1965 | Dolna | | |
| 1965 | Mukhujjay Paribar | | |
| 1965 | Gulmohor | | |
| 1965 | Tapashi | | |
| 1965 | Debotar Deep | | |
| 1965 | Pati Shangshodhini Shamity | | |
| 1966 | Mayabini Lane | | |
| 1966 | Shesh Tin Din | | |
| 1966 | Galpo Holeo Satti | Chhoto Khoka | |
| 1966 | Joradighir Chowdhury Paribar | | |
| 1966 | Kal Tumi Aleya | Care take babu Abhoy | |
| 1967 | Anthony Firingee | | |
| 1967 | Hathat Dekha | | |
| 1967 | Kheya | | |
| 1967 | Prastar Shakhhor | Goya, the Servant | |
| 1967 | Hate Bajare | Ajoblal | |
| 1967 | Ashite Ashiona | Sadananda | |
| 1967 | Miss Priyangbada | Halder / Miss Priyambada | |
| 1967 | Nayika Sangbad | | |
| 1968 | Rakta Rekha | | |
| 1968 | Garh Nashimpur | | |
| 1968 | Chowrangee | Nityahari Babu | |
| 1968 | Apanjon | Bhanu Ghosh (Politician) | |
| 1968 | Baghini | | |
| 1968 | Pathe Holo Dekha | | |
| 1969 | Dadu | | |
| 1969 | Shabarmati | Behari | |
| 1969 | Pratham Kadam Phul | Servant (Kakoli's home) | |
| 1969 | Basanta Bahar | | |
| 1969 | Ma O Meye | | |
| 1969 | Shukshari | | |
| 1970 | Aleyar Alo | | |
| 1970 | Rajkumari | Prashanna Bhattacharya | |
| 1970 | Sagina Mahato | | |
| 1971 | Ekhane Pinjar | | |
| 1971 | Pratham Bashanta | | |
| 1971 | Malyadan | | |
| 1971 | Bhanu Goenda Jahar Assistant | Bhanu Roy | |
| 1972 | Stree | | |
| 1973 | Roudrachhaya | | |
| 1973 | Bindur Chhele | Bhola | |
| 1973 | Nishikanya | | |
| 1973 | Nakal Shona | | |
| 1974 | Sangini | | |
| 1974 | Shangini | | |
| 1974 | Prantorekha | | |
| 1975 | Priyo Bandhabi | | |
| 1975 | Shayongswhidhha | | |
| 1975 | Nishimrigaya | | |
| 1975 | Kabi | | |
| 1975 | Sangshar Shimante | | |
| 1976 | Shikarokti | | |
| 1976 | Mohunbaganer Meye | | |
| 1976 | Harmonium | Police Inspector | |
| 1976 | Nidhiram Sardar | | |
| 1976 | Nandita | | |
| 1977 | Chhotto Nayak | | |
| 1977 | Ashadharon | | |
| 1977 | Ek Je Chhilo Desh | | |
| 1977 | Ramer Shumati | | |
| 1978 | Bandi | | |
| 1979 | Devdas | | |
| 1980 | Priyatoma | | |
| 1980 | Banchharamer Bagaan | | |
| 1980 | Bhagyachakra | | |
| 1980 | Shondhi | | |
| 1980 | Dorpochurna | | |
| 1980 | Matribhokto Ramprashad | | |
| 1981 | Shubarnolata | | |
| 1981 | Pratishodh | | |
| 1981 | Shahar Theke Dooray | Gokul Mukherjee (Jaya's father) | |
| 1981 | Kapalkundala | | |
| 1981 | Father | | |
| 1982 | Pipasa | | |
| 1982 | Maa Bhabani Maa Aamar | | |
| 1982 | Preyoshi | | |
| 1982 | Matir Swarga | | |
| 1982 | Rajbabhu | | |
| 1982 | Amrita Kumbher Sandhaney | | |
| 1982 | Bijoyinee | | |
| 1983 | Shahar Theke Dure | | |
| 1983 | Shargadapi Gariyashi | | |
| 1984 | Shorgol | | (final film role) |

=== Records (Comedy audio clips) ===
- Dhakar Garoan (1943)
- Cinema Bibhrat with Sabitri Chatterjee
- Babhharambhe Loghukria with Sabitri Chatterjee
- Shwami Chai
- Lady Typist
- Pujor Bajar
- Bibaha Bima
- Chandragupta
- Sputnik
- Sangeet Chayan
- Fatiklal
- Election with Chinmoy Roy
- Kartababur Deshbhraman
- Hanumaner Nagar Darshan
- Lord Bhanu
- Bhanu Elo Kolkataye
- Telephone Bibhrat
- Karta Banam Ginni
- Paribar parikalpana
- Naba Ramayan
- Amon Din O Ashbe
- Bhanushharananda
- Rajjotak with Gita Dey
- Juger Abhijog
- Ghatak Shangbad
- Chatujjay Barujjay
- Sarbojonin Jom Pujo
- Nayikar Shandhane
