= Jahor Roy =

Indian actor and comedian (1919–1977)

Jahar Ray
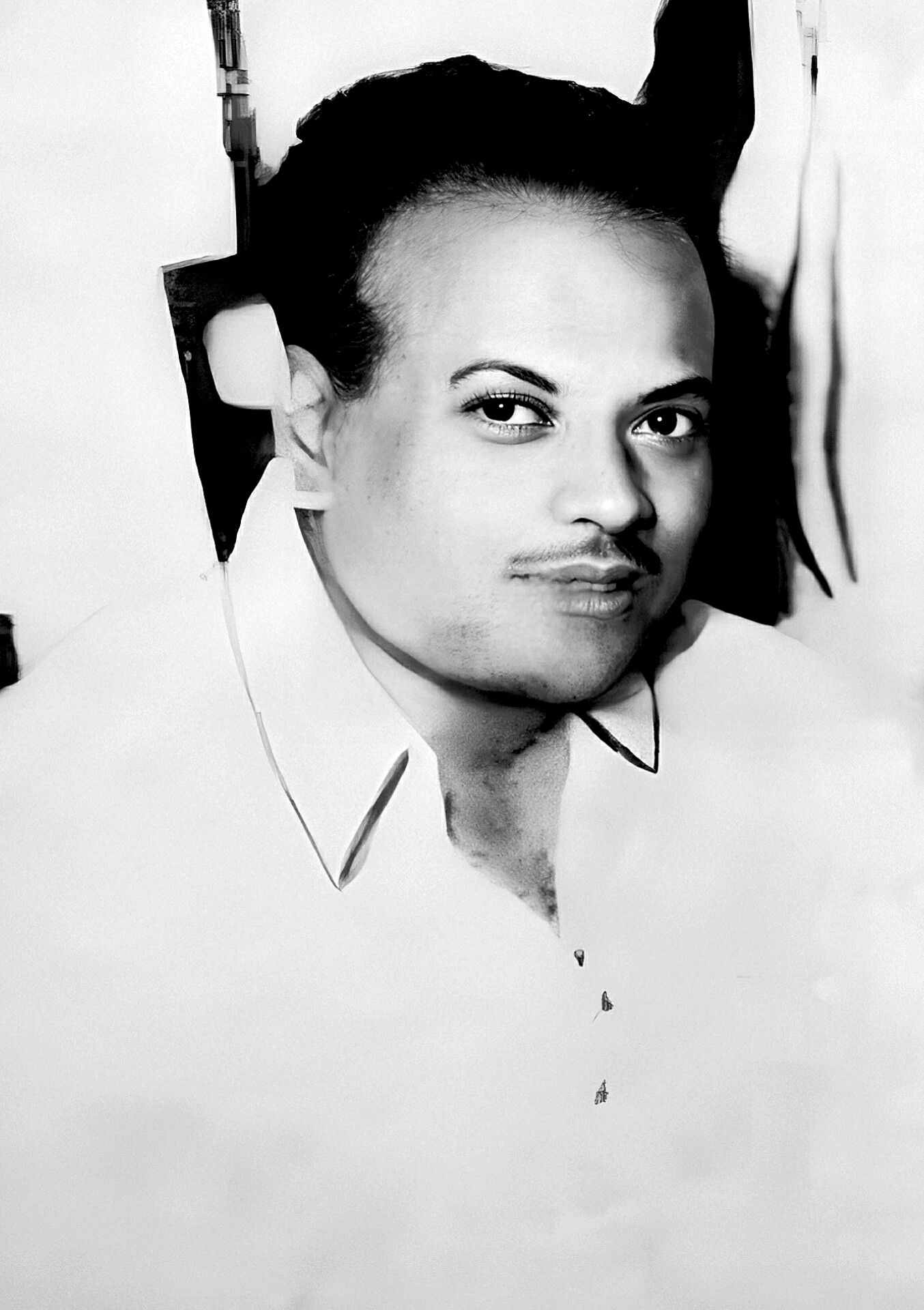
- Born: 19 September 1919; Barishal, Bengal Presidency, British India (now in Bangladesh)
- Died: 1 August 1977 (aged 57); Calcutta, West Bengal, India
- Occupations: Actor, comedian

Jahar Roy (19 September 1919 – 1 August 1977) was an Indian actor and comedian in Bengali cinema. He was known for his comedy films with Bhanu Bandyopadhyay.

== Early life ==
Roy came from a Bengali Baidya family having its roots in Mahilara, Barisal District (presently in Bangladesh). His father Satya Roy was also an actor and later moved to Patna, in search of livelihood. It is here where Jahar Roy completed his studies and started working odd jobs such as proofreader, medical representative and finally a tailor. He left all these and came to Calcutta around 1946.

== Movie career ==
Roy earned a substantial fan following even though he was a character actor. And all thanks to his roly-poly build, he was a frequent choice of directors who wanted to add comedy to serious movies. Roy's first major film roles were in Purbarag directed by Ardhendu Mukherjee, and in Anjangarh (1948) directed by Bimal Roy. Among his countless performances are Dhanyee Meye, Chadmabeshi and Bhanu Goenda Jahar Assistant. He acted in a couple of films under the direction of Satyajit Ray. Although a small role, Roy portrayed the male servant of Tulsi Chakrabarti in Parash Pathar. There was a meatier role in Goopy Gyne Bagha Byne where he played the role of a crooked warmongering minister of an innocent and peace-loving king. He also performed the song Cho Cho Kya Sharam Ki Baat in Chhadmabeshi. At the end of his career, when he was ailing, he did a cameo in Ritwik Ghatak's autobiographical film Jukti Takko Aar Gappo. He acted in around 350 films.

== Theatre and comedy ==
Jahor Roy was renowned for his significant contributions to Bengali theatre. Over a career spanning two decades, he showcased his acting prowess in numerous plays. A lifelong associate of Rang Mahal theatre in Kolkata, his performances in plays such as Adarsha Hindu Hotel, Ulka, Subarnagolak, and Anartha are still celebrated.

Known for his wit and adeptness in physical comedy, Jahor Roy also composed several skits, including Nyapasur Badh, Function theke shashan, and many others. Unfortunately, most of these compositions are no longer available.

== Selected filmography ==
Year	Film	Role	Director
1947	Purbarag		Ardhendu Mukherjee
1948	Anjangarh		Bimal Roy
1950	Pehla Aadmi	Soldier	Bimal Roy
1952	Basu Poribar		Nirmal Dey
1953	Sharey Chuattor	Kamakhya	Nirmal Dey
1955	Upahar	Servant	Tapan Sinha
1955	Dashyumohan	Drug addict	Ardhendu Mukherjee
1955	Dakinir Char		Premendra Mitra
1957	Ulka	Tupey	Naresh Mitra
1957	Kabuliwala	Bhola	Tapan Sinha
1958	Parash Pathar	Brajahari	Satyajit Ray
1958	Rajlakshmi O Srikanta	Sadhuji	Haridas Bhattacharya
1958	Bari Theke Paliye	Traffic policeman	Ritwik Ghatak
1958	Bhanu Pelo Lottery	Johure	
1958	Jamalaye Jibanta Manush	Bichitragupta	Prafulla Chakraborty
1962	Atal Jaler Ahwan	Jayantra's Servant	Ajoy Kar
1963	Palatak	Sudha's father	Tarun Majumdar
1965	Subarnarekha	Mukherjee	Ritwik Ghatak
1965	Abhaya O Srikanta	Mess owner	Haridas Bhattacharya
1964	Jotugriho		Uttam Kumar, Tapan Sinha
1965	Thana Theke Aschi		Hiren Nag
1966	Kal Tumi Aleya	Manager of medical home	Sachin Mukherjee
1967	Nayika Sangbad	Madhu	Agradoot
1967	Ashite Ashiona		Sree Jayadrath
1968	Chowringhee		Pinaki Bhushan Mukherjee
1968	Baghini		Bijoy Bose
1969	Goopy Gyne Bagha Byne	Prime Minister of Halla	Satyajit Ray
1970	Rajkumari		
1970	Nishipadma	Natabar	Arabinda Mukherjee
1971	Bhanu Goenda Jahar Assistant	Jahor Bandopadhyay	Purnendy Roychowdhury
1971	Dhanyee Meye	Gobordhon Chaudhuri	Arabinbo Mukherjee
1971	Chhadmabeshi	Driver Moshaheblaal	Agradoot
1972	Morjina Abdulla	Baba Mustafa	Dinen Gupto
1974	Jukti Takko Aar Gappo	Cameo	Ritwik Ghatak
1974	Thagini		Tarun Majumdar
1975	Chhutir Phande		
1977	Ek Je Chhilo Desh	Doctor	Tapan Sinha
