= Ekti Raat =

Indian Bengali language film

- DVD cover
- Directed by: Chitta Basu
- Written by: Story - Balai Chand Mukhopadhyay; Dialogues - Balai Chand Mukhopadhyay
- Screenplay by: Nripendra Krishna Chatterjee
- Based on: Bhimpalashree by Balai Chand Mukhopadhyay or Banaphool
- Produced by: Harendranath Chattopadhyay
- Starring: Uttam Kumar; Suchitra Sen; Chhabi Biswas
- Cinematography: Bijoy Ghosh
- Edited by: Baidyanath Chatterjee
- Music by: Anupam Ghatak
- Production company: H.N.C Productions
- Distributed by: Chitra Paribeshak Private Limited
- Release date: 26 April 1956
- Running time: 136 minutes
- Country: India
- Language: Bengali

Ekti Raat (transl. One Night) is a 1956 Indian Bengali-language comedy film directed by Chitta Basu and produced by Harendranath Chattopadhyay based on, Bhimpalashree, a story of Bengali novelist Balai Chand Mukhopadhyay. The film stars Uttam Kumar and Suchitra Sen in the lead roles with Tulsi Chakraborty and Bhanu Banerjee. This film was released on 26 April 1956 in the banner of H.N.C. Productions. This film became successful at the box office.

== Plot ==
This film revolves around the miscommunication and misunderstanding of two couples and their family leading to comic situations. Sushavan Dutta and his wife, Anita, were invited at their relative Digbijay Babu's house. While on a journey Anita misses the train and Sushavan has to journey with another lady Santana. Santana is the wife of famous political leader Brojesh. At night they take shelter as husband and wife in Gosaiji's hotel, Harimatar Panthashala because Gosaiji allows married couples only. Santana carries a puppy with her, which runs away from the garden of the hotel and Sushovan has to chase it at night. When Anita's mother is angered upon learning that Sushavan is untraced.

== Cast ==
- Uttam Kumar as Sushovan
- Suchitra Sen as Santana
- Tulsi Chakraborty as Gosaiji
- Bhanu Bannerjee as Chaku
- Anup Kumar as Fatka
- Shyam Laha
- Kamal Mitra as Brojeshwar
- Jahor Roy as Paresh
- Pahadi Sanyal as Digbijoy
- Chandrabati Devi
- Sabita Bose as Anita Debi, Sushovan's Wife in the movie
- Molina Devi as Shampu, Anita's mother
- Jiben Bose as Sadananda Behari
- Gurudas Banerjee as Jitu
- Menaka Devi as Khyanto

== Soundtrack ==
Ekti Raat

Soundtrack album by Anupam Ghatak
- Released: 1956
- Recorded: 1955
- Studio: H.N.C Productions
- Genre: Feature Film Soundtrack
- Length: 0:08:08
- Label: Angel Digital Private Limited
- Producer: Harendranath Chattopadhyay

Anupam Ghatak chronology
Shankar Narayan Bank (1956)	Ekti Raat (1956)	Surer Parashey (1957)

All lyrics are written by Gauriprasanna Mazumder; all music is composed by Anupam Ghatak.

No.	Title	Singer	Length
1.	"O Bashi Dake"	Sandhya Mukherjee	2:23
2.	"Kakan Bole Shrimoti Tobe"	Sandhya Mukherjee	2:28
3.	"Pradiper Sikha Keno Kape"	Sandhya Mukherjee	3:17
Total length:			08:08

== Reception ==
The film is remembered as one of the best films of the Uttam Suchitra pair. It became a hit at the box office and ran for 50 days in the theaters. When it re-released in the 1970s it again became successful.

=== Reworked ===
In 1990s a Bengali television series is made as name Manush and Hindi series Peechha Karo were based on the same plot.
