= Saheb (1981 film) =

1981 Indian Bengali sports drama film by Bijoy Bose

- Directed by: Bijoy Bose
- Based on: Saheb (radio play) by Ranjan Roy
- Screenplay by: Bijoy Bose
- Dialogues by: Bijoy Bose
- Story by: Ranjan Roy
- Produced by: Shyamal Chatterjee
- Starring: Tapas Paul; Utpal Dutt; Madhabi Mukherjee; Mahua Roy Chowdhury; Anil Chatterjee; Shambhu Bhattacharya
- Cinematography: Gour Karmakar
- Edited by: Pranab Ghosh
- Music by: Abhijit Bandyopadhyay
- Production company: Basanta Pictures
- Distributed by: Piyali Pictures; Basanta Pictures
- Release date: 2 October 1981
- Running time: 122 minutes
- Country: India
- Language: Bengali

Saheb is a 1981 Indian Bengali-language sports drama film co-written and directed by Bijoy Bose. Produced by Shyamal Chatterjee under the banner of Basanta Pictures in their first venture, the film is based on a radio play of the same name written by Ranjan Roy. It stars Tapas Paul in the titular role, alongside Utpal Dutt, Madhabi Mukherjee and Mahua Roy Chowdhury in lead roles, while Shambhu Bhattacharya, N. Vishwanathan, Nimu Bhowmik, Kaushik Banerjee, Shakuntala Barua, Ratna Ghoshal and Rekha Chatterjee play supporting roles, with Anil Chatterjee in a special appearance. It plots a promising football player Saheb, the youngest son of his father, who stands like a saviour at the time of financial crisis during his sister’s marriage, by giving his kidney up without informing his family members.

The film marks Bijoy Bose's first collaboration with Tapas Paul. Music of the film was composed by Abhijit Bandyopadhyay, with lyrics penned by Rabindranath Tagore and Gauriprasanna Mazumder. The cinematography and editing of the film were handled by Gour Karmakar and Pranab Ghosh respectively. It released theatrically on 2 October 1981, coinciding with Durga Puja, opening to huge positive response. The film was a box office hit and also became a breakthrough for Paul to be established as a leading star in Bengali cinema.

Tapas Paul won a Filmfare Award for his performance in the film in 1981 and is considered to be one of the best films in his career.

== Plot ==
Saheb, a jovial, friendly, and kind-hearted boy loves to play soccer. He is neglected by his selfish brothers. Only his sister-in-law and his only sister Bulti appreciates and takes care of him. Saheb has the potential to become a good goalkeeper, but a lack of support and care from his family hinders his growth. Suddenly Bulti's marriage is fixed with a well-educated family. The budget of the event makes Saheb's family helpless. At that time, Saheb sells one of his kidneys and spoils his football career. No one was aware of his decision. On the day of his sister's marriage when everyone was enjoying themselves, Saheb fights for his life. Suddenly his sister-in-law realises everything and becomes upset. All his brothers then impose allegations against him for that unaccounted money, his sister-in-law exposes everything and makes them quiet. At last, Saheb's incompetent father goes to hospital and mourns for his neglected child.

== Cast ==
- Tapas Paul as Saheb
- Utpal Dutt as Biprodas Banerjee, Saheb's father
- Madhabi Mukherjee as Saheb's sister-in-law
- Mahua Roy Chowdhury as Bulti, Saheb's sister
- Shambhu Bhattacharya as Saheb's coach
- Ajoy Ganguly as Saheb's elder brother
- Kaushik Banerjee as Bulti's husband
- Nimu Bhowmik as Saheb's second elder brother
- Shakuntala Barua as Saheb's second elder sister-in-law
- Ratna Ghoshal
- Rekha Chatterjee as Saheb's elder sister
- N. Vishwanathan

=== Special appearance ===
- Anil Chatterjee as Dr. Ghoshal

== Soundtrack ==
The score and soundtrack of the film was composed by Abhijit Bandyopadhyay. The soundtrack album includes a Rabindra Sangeet, while other songs are penned by Gauriprasanna Mazumder.

Track listing
No.	Title	Lyrics	Singer(s)	Length
1.	"Hare Re Re Re"	Rabindranath Tagore	Dwijen Mukherjee, Arundhati Holme Chowdhury	1:50
2.	"Kawto Swapno"	Gauriprasanna Mazumder	Dwijen Mukherjee	3:22
3.	"Ekta Cup Ekta Shield"	Gauriprasanna Mazumder	Tarun Bandyopadhyay	3:05
4.	"O Mukhapadme"	Gauriprasanna Mazumder	Manna Dey	3:03
Total length:				11:20

== Reception ==
The film addresses the topic of football in the Bengali society in what has been considered a distinctive way through its social and economic focus.
