= Mangalya Balam =

- Theatrical release poster in Telugu
- Directed by: Adurthi Subba Rao
- Screenplay by: Adurthi Subba Rao; D. Madhusudhana Rao; Acharya Aatreya (dialogues)
- Based on: Agni Pariksha by Ashapurna Devi
- Produced by: D. Madhusudhana Rao
- Starring: Akkineni Nageswara Rao; Savitri
- Cinematography: P. S. Selvaraj
- Edited by: A. Sanjeevi
- Music by: Master Venu
- Production company: Annapurna Pictures
- Distributed by: Navayuga Films
- Release date: 7 January 1959
- Running time: 177 minutes
- Country: India
- Languages: Tamil; Telugu

Mangalya Balam (transl. The Power of the Wedding Chain) is a 1959 Indian Telugu-language romantic drama film, produced by D. Madhusudhana Rao under Annapurna Pictures banner and directed by Adurthi Subba Rao. It stars Akkineni Nageswara Rao and Savitri, with music composed by Master Venu. The film is a remake of the 1954 Bengali film Agni Pariksha, which was based on Ashapurna Devi's novel of the same name. It was simultaneously made by the same banner and director in Tamil as Manjal Mahimai (transl. The Power of Turmeric).

Poster of Tamil version

== Cast ==
- Savitri as Saroja
- Akkineni Nageswara Rao as Chandrasekhar
- Rajasulochana as Meena
- Relangi / K. A. Thangavelu as Kailasam
- Suryakantham as Kanthamma
- S. V. Ranga Rao as Papa Rao
- Kannamba as Parvatamma
- G. Varalakshmi as Seeta
- Ramana Reddy as Achary
- Ramana Murthy / K. Balaji as Dr. Suryam
- A. V. Subba Rao as Rangaiah
- Dr. Sivaramakrishnaiah
- Vangara Venkata Subbaiah
- Sukumari as Street Dancer.

== Soundtrack ==
The music was composed by Master Venu. He borrowed only one tune from the Bengali film's composer Anupam Ghatak, for the song "Penu Cheekataye Lokam" from its original version "Ke Tumi Amare Dako".

Telugu Track List
| No. | Title | Lyrics | Artist(s) | Length |
|---|---|---|---|---|
| 1. | "Chekkili Meeda" | Kosaraju | Madhavapeddi Satyam, Jikki | 02:58 |
| 2. | "Tirupati Venkateswara" | Kosaraju | K. Jamuna Rani | 03:55 |
| 3. | "My Dear Meena" | Kosaraju | Madhavapeddi Satyam, Jikki | 03:16 |
| 4. | "Aakaasa Veedhilo" | Sri Sri | Ghantasala, P. Susheela | 03:51 |
| 5. | "Vaadina Poole" | Sri Sri | Ghantasala, P. Susheela | 03:32 |
| 6. | "Avunantaaraa" | Sri Sri | P. Leela, P. Susheela | 04:43 |
| 7. | "Haayiga Alumagalai" | Sri Sri | P. Susheela & Udutha Sarojini | 03:32 |
| 8. | "Theliyani Aanandham" | Sri Sri | P. Susheela | 03:25 |
| 9. | "Penucheekataye Lokam" | Sri Sri | Ghantasala, P. Susheela | 03:14 |
| Total length: | | | | 30:26 |

Tamil Track List

| Song | Singers | Lyrics | Length |
|---|---|---|---|
| "Anbinaal Ondrai Neengal" | P. Suseela, Udutha Sarojini & group | Udumalai Narayana Kavi | 02:48 |
| "Iduvenna Aanandamo" | P. Susheela | Udumalai Narayana Kavi | 03:24 |
| "Thiruppadhi Vengkadesane" | K. Jamuna Rani | Udumalai Narayana Kavi | 03:58 |
| "Kodai Maraindhaal Inbam Varum" | Ghantasala, P. Suseela | Udumalai Narayana Kavi | 03:17 |
| "Undenbeeraa Ille Poi Enbeera | P. Leela, P. Susheela | Udumalai Narayana Kavi | |
| "Aagaaya Veedhiyil Azhagaana Vennilaa" | Ghantasala, P. Suseela | Udumalai Narayana Kavi | 04:46 |
| "Maaraadha Sogam Thaano" | Ghantasala, P. Suseela | Udumalai Narayana Kavi | 03:21 |
| "My Dear Meena Un Idea Enna" | S. C. Krishnan, Jikki | A. Maruthakasi | 03:17 |
| "Aanadhu Aachu Ponadhu Pochu" | S. C. Krishnan, Jikki | A. Maruthakasi | 03:08 |

== Production ==
Bhavanarayana, producer of Meghasandesham suggested to Dukkipati Madhusudhana Rao to watch the Bengali film Agni Pariksha (1954). Madhusudhana bought the remake rights after being impressed with the film and approached Atreya to write the screenplay and dialogues for the film. One of the major changes the maker brought in was while in the original version the girl's father dies of shock, in Mangalya Balam, his character was retained till the last frame. Mangalya Balam was said to be the first Telugu film to shoot in Ooty and it was also Savitri's first visit to the hill town. The Tamil version Manjal Mahimai was simultaneously made retaining all the leading actors and technicians with two changes to the cast – K. A. Thangavelu and K. Balaji replacing Relangi and Ramanamurthy respectively.

== Release ==
Mangalya Balam was released on 7 January 1959 and for the first time in the history of Telugu cinema, the hundred days function was held in an open arena, the Municipal High School grounds, Vijayawada with thousands of cine-fans participating and presided over by the then Chief Minister of Andhra Pradesh, Kasu Brahmananda Reddy. Manjal Mahimai was released on 14 January 1959 and ran for a hundred days.

== Awards ==
National Film Awards

- National Film Award for Best Feature Film in Telugu – 1959
