= Shono Ekti Mujiborer Theke =

1971 song by Anshuman Roy

Song by Anshuman Roy

from the album Dada Paye Podi Rey
- Language: Bengali; English
- English title: A Million Mujibors Singing
- Written: 13 April 1971
- Published: 22 April 1971
- Studio: Hindusthan Record
- Venue: Kolkata, India
- Genre: Modern music
- Length: 2:49
- Composer: Anshuman Roy
- Lyricist: Gauriprasanna Mazumder
- Producer: Upen Tarafdar
External audio
- "Original record of the song" on YouTube

"Shono Ekti Mujiborer Theke" is a 1971 Bengali-language Indian song first broadcast from Akashvani Kolkata on 22 April. The artist and composer of this modern music was Anshuman Roy. Gauriprasanna Mazumder was lyricist of the song. The song was recorded in Hindusthan Record. This is the second song about Sheikh Mujibur Rahman that became popular in India and Bangladesh. The song inspired the people of Bangladesh during the liberation war of Bangladesh.

== Background ==
On 13 April 1971, vocalist Anshuman Roy, lyricist Gouriprasanna Majumdar, vocalist Dinendra Chowdhury and Upen Tarafdar who was producer of Akashbani Kolkata were sitting and chatting over tea at a tea shop located near a movie theater called Padmashri in Kolkata. At that time they were discussing the situation in East Pakistan during the 1971 war. During the chat, Upen Tarfdar played 7 March Speech of Bangabandhu on the tape recorder to everyone. He then expressed his desire to play a song during the broadcast of the speech from radio station due to its short length. Then Gouriprasanna Majumdar wrote the lyrics. Anshuman Roy then decided to sing a song based on the lyrics, which he composed himself.

== Broadcast and record ==
After the song is completed, Anshuman sang the song at the residence of Devdulal Banerjee, a news reader of Akashvani at Purndas Road. While singing, Upen Tarafdar recorded the song using a spool recorder. He decided to play the song from Aakashvani Kolkata's radio station during the broadcast of the speech at "Sangbad Bichitra" program in the same day the song was recorded. Nine days after its airing, the song was officially recorded at a studio named Hindusthan Record. At that time the song, directed by Dinendra Chowdhury, was recorded separately in English.

== Achievement ==
Year	Award	Nomination	Category	Ref
2012	Bangladesh Posthumous state honors	Anshuman Roy	For the song	
2012	Bangladesh Posthumous freedom fighter honour	Anshuman Roy	For the song	
