= Abhijit Banerjee (composer) =

Indian composer and lyricist (1931–2022)

Abhijit Banerjee অভিজিৎ বন্দ্যোপাধ্যায়

Background information
- Born: July 24, 1931; Kolkata, West Bengal
- Origin: Kolkata
- Died: February 21, 2022 (aged 90) Kolkata, West Bengal
- Occupations: Composer; lyricist

Abhijit Banerjee (July 24, 1931 – February 21, 2022; Bengali: অভিজিৎ বন্দ্যোপাধ্যায়, romanized: Abhijit Bandyopadhyay) (Note: Bengali pronunciation: [obʱid͡ʒit bndopadʱaj]) was an Indian composer and lyricist who primarily composed music for Bengali non-film songs (singles). He worked with musicians such as Hemanta Mukhopadhyay, Lata Mangeshkar, Manna Dey, Asha Bhosle, Pratima Bandyopadhyay, and Pulak Bandyopadhyay. He was a close associate and assistant of Salil Chowdhury and a music teacher at Bani Chakra school.

Some of the albums whose songs he composed were Surer Ek Nam Vivekananda, Antar Mondire Jago, Megher Somuddure, Nirudessher Pothik, etc. He excessively worked on composing songs written by Prabir Mazumdar, Anal Chatterjee and Pulak Banerjee.

== Musical career ==
Abhijit Banerjee was born into a Brahmin family in Kolkata and became interested in music from childhood. He learned of the writer Rabindranath Tagore and of his songs Rabindra Sangeet. As a student, he used to sing "Premer Samadhitire" by S. D. Burman and "Kotha Koyonako" by Hemanta Mukhopadhyay (Mukherjee), and also songs from Rabindra Sangeet.

He and his elder brother Arindam did many things together, ranging from playing kirtan at home, trying to imitate the Nagar kirtan performed by Brahmins in their home, and going to play or to listen to music. His school friend Prabir Mazumdar helped him write musicals. He broke his neck in class eight and played xylophone in a dance group, one of his first instruments. Two years later, he returned to playing normal music under the requisition of Prabir Mazumdar. Mazumdar took him to the Gananatya Sangha, later known as Indian People's Theater Association (IPTA), which was an organization of Indian theater artists.

Banerjee used to play near the grounds of Dhakuria railway station, where discussions were sometimes held. One day, while a discussion was being held in occasion of a railway strike, Banerjee saw a dark, slim man wearing a biscuit-colored coat, shirt, and pajamas. He took off his coat and sang while playing a harmonium. Banerjee remarked being stunned by his beautiful singing voice. He later came to know that the man was Salil Chowdhury, an Indian lyricist and composer. He later met him in Gananatya Sangha.

One day, his brother Arindam Banerjee asked Abhijit Banerjee to compose the music for a poem. He made a tune similar to Rabindra Sangeet. Afterwards, his brother Arindam suggested that he compose the poem "Chhipkhan Tindar" written by Satyendranath Dutta. Banerjee found himself surprised with his own tune after he composed it, in which composition he had used major and minor tunes without knowing them. He left the composed song aside. After a few days, his friend Prabir came to Banerjee and told him "Salilda (Note: Nickname of Salil Chowdhury) said to take you." Banerjee took the song and went to Chowdhury's house in Kasba, Kolkata. Hearing Banerjee's tune, Salil Chowdhury endorsed his writing and took him to the record label Saregama, thereafter giving the song to Shyamal Mitra to record. From the recording of this composed song, Banerjee became a close associate of Salil Chowdhury. This tune composed by him was used by Salil Chowdhury in his songs "Palki Chole", "Gayer Bodhu" and "Ranar". Banerjee also found a role in Saregama (His Master's Voice or HMV). Chowdhury played the organ in Shyamal Mitra's song "Hongshopakha Diye", which was taken nine times to properly record. During rehearsal, Mitra left by telling Banerjee of a Mohun Bagan match he had to watch.

Banerjee's first composed songs included "Ei Shaon Gogone" by Hiralal Sarkhel, written by Anal Chattopadhyay; and "Kothay Shonar Dhan" by Gananatya Sangha. During this time, he was active in the Gananatya Sangha, and alongside this he practiced Rabindra Sangeet by listening to the songs of Tagore. A few days later, he learned (Indian) classical music from Ushaprasanna Bandopadhyay and piano from V. Balsara. He worked with Salil Chowdhury on fixing and setting melodies and tunes of songs. Salilda occasionally held discussions with Anal Chattopadhyay, Abhijit Banerjee, and Prabir Mazumdar. Salilda once asked them to play a West Indian tune while he himself sang his written song "Dhitang Dhitang Bole", which was later recorded by singer Hemanta Mukhopadhyay. He put music to "O Parul Parul" sung by Gayetri Basu and "Jiboner Balubelay" by Dwijen Mukhopadhyay around the same time.

Banerjee's first "successful" song composition was by composing the song "Tomar Duchokhe Amar Swapna," written by Pulak Bandyopadhyay on the "Basic Record" music label. It was sung by Pratima Bandopadhyay in 1957. "Oi Akashe Klanti Nei" by Pratima Banerjee was composed by Abhijit Banerjee, where he took a new approach by himself to compose the song, and arrange the way in which it was sung. In the pujas, Hemanta Mukherjee had agreed to sing Banerjee's composed song. But he later said to him that he would have to sing Mukul Dutt's song and would not be able to sing Banerjee's song. During the pujas, Mukherjee released "Amio Pother Moto" written by Mukul Dutt and composed by Mukherjee; and "Onek Aranya" with lyrics and music by Banerjee during the puja. He named Banerjee as the composer of both songs to give him more royalties. In the later pujas, he wrote the songs "Sobai Chole Geche" and "Emon Ekta Jhor Uthuk" for the album Basanta Bondona. A long time before, his song "Sonali Champa Aay" was sung by Hemanta. Afterwards, he went to Hemanta who remarked him and his songs successful. They had been working for ten years at this time.

Singers Dwijen Mukhopadhyay and Tarun Bandyopadhyay were close friends, with Abhijit Banerjee composing many puja songs for them, such as "Hajar Mone Bheere" sung by Dwijen Mukherjee, and another Dwijen Mukherjee's song, "Kopale Sidur Sidur Tip Porecho", composed by Banerjee. Other song such as "Saatnari Har Debo" was written by Shyamal Mitra as a "modern song" (Adhunik gaan), and Banerjee was assigned to compose it. The song was sung by Dwijen Mukhopadhyay. Miltoo Ghosh wrote, and Abhijit Banerjee composed the two songs "Dol Dol Choturdolay" and "Tolpar Tolpar," which Tarun Banerjee sang in concerts.

Banerjee worked many times with singer Subir Sen. They were both fans of foreign songs and talked about their song views. As a result of the conversations, Banerjee was inspired by foreign songs. He composed the songs "Saradin Tomay Bhebe" from Jim Reeves' "I hear the sound of distant drums", "E Jeno Sei Chokh" from "Snow Flakes", "Monalisa" from "Mona Lisa" performed by Nat King Cole and others being inspired by foreign music.

He worked on composing the songs "Meghla Dine Neel Akashe Swopno Choray" written by Ananda Mukhopadhyay, "Tumi Meghla Diner" sung by Satinath Mukhopadhya, "Jodi Amake Dekho" by Manabendra Mukhopadhyay, "Ki Jeno Aaj" by Ilya Basu, "Dur Bonopothe" by Gayetri Basu and written by Pulak Bandyopadhyay, "Chondroduti Ratri" by Arundhati Holme Chowdhury, etc. Abhijit Bandyopadhyay's composition work was less on film songs than on standalone singles. Recording of the film Jiban Rohoshyo was being done in the Bombay Laboratory studio in 1972. He reached Bombay on time for the recording of songs of Jiban Rohoshyo, Banerjee's first film he worked on. The song "Prithibi Takiye Dekho" was sung by Manna Dey. Manna Dey commented after he recorded, "This song was composed by Abhijit Banerjee thinking of Hemanta, how could it be done by me?" Asha Bhosle was scheduled to record two songs for the film. But Bhosle later informed him that she would not be able to sing on the third day she originally stated, but on the thirteenth day. And after a few days, Bhosle called again to inform him that she would only be able to sing one composed song by Abhijit Banerjee. On the same day she called, Bhosle sung for seven music directors, including S. D. Burman. On the twelfth day, Banerjee went to Bhosle to present the written songs. On their assessment, Bhosle displayed keenness and agreed to sing the second song after she listened to the first. During this time, Banerjee stubbed his toe on a door in the studio and was bleeding, but he continued without changing the schedule. On the thirteenth day, she gave Banerjee the first recording appointment of that day and sang the songs, which were titled "O Pakhi Ure Aay Ure Aay" and "Jodi Kane Kane Kichu Bole", with lyrics by Pulak Banerjee. Banerjee also wrote for singer Subir Sen, and remarked that he lost count of the number of songs he wrote and/or composed for Sen to sing.

At some point, he worked with singer Haimanti Shukla. As expressed by Shukla, his composed song "Ekhono Sarengita Bajche" gave her popularity in the music industry, and her audience wanted another song by Banerjee to be sung by her. In the film Balak Saratchandra, Shukla sang the song "Shiv Thakurer Golay Dole Boichi Foler Malika." The film, along with the song, was released after seven days (in theaters). Haimanti Shukla was first brought to Banerjee by Pulak Bandyopadhyay. At the time, she had released only one song: "E To Kanna Noy Amar." This song introduced Shukla to Banerjee. Later she sang songs from classical to rap under the initiative of Banerjee. Abhijit Banerjee worked extensively with Pulak Bandyopadhyay. While he himself sometimes worked as a lyricist and wrote for film songs, most of the film songs he composed were written by Pulak Bandyopadhyay. His film songs "Tung Tang Pianoy Sarati Dupur" and "Jhonnon Tonnon" in the film Haraye Khuji were sung by Aarti Mukherjee, with lyrics by Banerjee and "Phule Phule Bodhu" by Anup Ghoshal. In the hit film Tilottama directed by Dinesh Gupta, he composed "Rong Sudhu Diyei Gele" and "Amay Tomar Moto Pashan Kore Goro", which became some of his superhit songs. Pulak Bandyopadhyay wrote the song "Lomba Daari Chowkidar Bolche Heke Khobbodar" in Dushtu Misti film, with music by Banerjee, and the artist as Haimanti Shukla. Pulak Bandyopadhyay's last film he worked on was Rinmukti, in which he composed songs by working equally with Abhijit Bandyopadhyay, released after Pulak Bandyopadhyay had died. Aarti Mukherjee won the BFJA award for best female singer for singing the song "Tung Tang Pianoy Sarati Dupur" jointly written by Pulak Banerjee and Abhijit Banerjee.

== Death ==
Banerjee suffered from old-age-related health issues. He was admitted to a hospital and discharged a few days later, before he died. Abhijit Banerjee died on February 21, 2022 (Monday), at the age of 90 in Kolkata, around at 11 p.m. He had two sons and a daughter at the time. Lata Mangeshkar, who Banerjee worked with, also died in February 2022, a few days before him. Mamata Banerjee wrote on his death:

I express my deep sorrow at the passing away of eminent composer and lyricist Abhijit Banerjee. He breathed his last today in Kolkata. He was 90 years old.

He has composed songs for legendary artists like Hemant Mukherjee, Lata Mangeshkar, Asha Bhosle. Notable albums under his musical direction include: Antar Mandir Jaago, Megher Samuddure, Niruddesh Pathik, Teesta Amar, Surya Ek Naam Vivekananda. Notable songs composed include: O Pakhi Ude Aay, Jad Kanne Kanne etc.

Abhijit Babu was a member of the West Bengal State Music Academy. His death is a loss to the music world.

I express my deepest condolences to the family and fans of Abhijit Banerjee.

— Mamata Banerjee, Chief Minister of West Bengal

Rupankar Bagchi posted on social media announcing about his death. He remarked that Banerjee had been suffering from health issues of old age for some time, and was admitted to a hospital sometimes. He wrote that Banerjee had returned home after being in the hospital for a few days. Bagchi expressed his sorrow by getting the news of his death on Monday morning.

Arundhati Holme Chowdhury commented "Our time seems to be running out quickly." She described that lyricists, artists and composers of the 20th century were passing away one by one. Chowdhury remarked that Abhijit Banerjee was the music composer of many of her film songs. Banerjee's body was kept in Bani Chakra to pay last respects. His death occurred on Language Day, which musician Saikat Mitra wrote.

== Legacy ==
The planning of a new version of the song "Cholche Tori" was made by Abhijit Banerjee's son Amit Bandyopadhyay (Banerjee), serving as a tribute to Abhijit Banerjee. The original song was the musical version of "Durer Palla", written by Satyendranath Dutta. It was Banerjee's first song composition written under the initiative of his brother Arindam Banerjee which was later sung by Shyamal Mitra. Amit Banerjee presented the song in a new way and version. The song featured Amit Banerjee and Soumya Dasgupta, the son of Sudhin Dasgupta; and Sanjoy Chowdhury, the son of Salil Chowdhury. A video was planned, which included Amit Banerjee's music group, Calcutta Choir and others. The song was sung by artists such as Nachiketa Chakraborty, Lopamudra Mitra, Saikat Mitra, Nandita, Debashis Basu, Rupankar (Bagchi), Raghab Chatterjee, Anweshaa, Srikanta Acharya, Antara Chowdhury, Jayati Chakraborty, Gaurav Sarkar, Kazi Kamal Nasser and Parthasarathi Ekalavya. The video was directed and edited by Surojeet Chakraborty and Tanushree Chakraborty. Soumya Banerjee did the graphics designing.

== Selected albums discography ==
Albums and films with composed songs by Abhijit Banerjee (selected list)
Release year	Song name	Singer	Lyricist	Album name	No.
1972	O Pakhi Ure Aay	Asha Bhosle	Pulak Bandyopadhyay	Jiban Rahasya	1
1972	Prithibi Takiye Dekho	Manna Dey	Pulak Bandyopadhyay	Jiban Rahasya	2
1972	Jadi Kane Kane Kichhu Bale	Asha Bhosle	Pulak Bandyopadhyay	Jiban Rahasya	3
1972	Ke Tumi Ke Tumi	Manna Dey	Pulak Bandyopadhyay	Jiban Rahasya	4
1974	Bishnupriya Go Bahu Jug Pare	Geeta Mukherjee	Abhijit Banerjee	Songs By Geeta Mukherjee	5
1974	Katha Dao Katha Dao Tumi Chole Jabe Na	Geeta Mukherjee	Abhijit Banerjee	Songs By Geeta Mukherjee	6
1974	Tung Tang Piyanoy	Aarti Mukherjee	Pulak Bandyopadhyay	Haraye Khunji	7
1974	Jhananana Tananana Baje	Aarti Mukherjee	Pulak Bandyopadhyay	Haraye Khunji	8
1974	Se Bhabe Sabuj Pathar	Hemanta Mukherjee	Pulak Bandyopadhyay	Haraye Khunji	9
1974	Phule Phule Badhu	Anup Ghoshal	Pulak Bandyopadhyay	Haraye Khunji	10
1974	Chhaila Chhabila	Banasree Sengupta and Sabita Chowdhury	Pulak Bandyopadhyay	Haraye Khunji	11
1975	Lekhapara Kare Je	Aarti Mukherjee	Pulak Bandyopadhyay	Dustu - Misti	12
1975	Hurre Hure Sheora Gachhe	Aarti Mukherjee	Pulak Bandyopadhyay	Dustu - Misti	13
1975	Lambadaari Chowkidar	Haimanti Shukla	Pulak Bandyopadhyay	Dustu - Misti	14
1975	Tomari Udyane Tomari Jatane	Gayatri Chowdhury	Nabanita Chakraborty	Dustu - Misti	15
1975	Dhum Dharakka De Na Dhakka	Haimanti Shukla	Pulak Bandyopadhyay	Dustu - Misti	16
1975	O Binodini Radhare	Hemanta Mukherjee	Pulak Bandyopadhyay	Balak Saratchandra	17
1975	Shib Thakurer Galay Dole	Haimanti Shukla	Pulak Bandyopadhyay	Balak Saratchandra	18
1978	Golaper Oli Achhe	Manna Dey	Pulak Bandyopadhyay	Tilottama	19
1978	Rang Shudhu Diyei Gele	Manna Dey and Arundhati Holme Chowdhury	Pulak Bandyopadhyay	Tilottama	20
1978	Amay Tomar Motoi	Aarti Mukherjee	Pulak Bandyopadhyay	Tilottama	21
1978	Khub Ki Mondo Hoto	Arundhati Holme Chowdhury	Pulak Bandyopadhyay	Tilottama	22
1982	Oi Neel Neel	Manna Dey and Aarti Mukherjee	Parthapratim Chowdhury	Rajbadhu	23
1982	Aaju Rang Khelatu	Sandhya Mukherjee	Parthapratim Chowdhury	Rajbadhu	24
1982	Hartan Na Ruitan	Manna Dey	Parthapratim Chowdhury	Rajbadhu	25
1982	Bhebechhilam Phuler Mato	Arundhati Holme Chowdhury	Parthapratim Chowdhury	Rajbadhu	26
1982	Baro Asha Kore Esechhi Go	Arundhati Holme Chowdhury and Hemanta Mukherjee	Rabindranath Tagore	Rajbadhu	27
1983	Shono Shono	Hemanta Mukherjee and Manna Dey	Parthapratim Chowdhury	Chena Achena (Note: Only songs composed by Abhijit Banerjee are included, additional songs in the album exist.)	28
1983	Dekho Esechhi	Manna Dey	Parthapratim Chowdhury	Chena Achena	29
1983	Amay Rakhte Jodi	Hemanta Mukherjee	Atulprasad Sen	Chena Achena	30
1983	Pran Amar Pran	Manna Dey	Parthapratim Chowdhury	Chena Achena	31
1983	Tumi Je Amar	Lata Mangeshkar	Gauriprasanna Mazumdar	Raktoraag	32
1983	Aasmane Jato Roshni	Aarti Mukherjee	Gauriprasanna Mazumdar	Raktoraag	33
1983	Ami Gharer Ashay	Usha Mangeshkar	Gauriprasanna Mazumdar	Raktoraag	34
1983	Raso Raso	Shailendra Singh	Mohini Chowdhury	Raktoraag	35
1983	Hai Hai Hai	Manna Dey	Mohini Chowdhury	Raktoraag	36
1983	Welcome	Usha Uthup	Santaram Nandgaonkar	Raktoraag	37
1984	Jekhanei Thako Na	Arundhati Holme Chowdhury	Pulak Bandyopadhyay	Pujarini	38
1984	Dadubhai Taratari Baro Hao	Manna Dey	Pulak Bandyopadhyay	Pujarini	39
1984	Baundule Chandicharan	Haimanti Shukla	Pulak Bandyopadhyay	Pujarini	40
1984	Mala Ditei Badle Geli	Manna Dey	Pulak Bandyopadhyay	Pujarini	41
1996	Bolechhile Tumi Gaan Shonabe	Alpana Banerjee	Abhijit Banerjee	Chayanika, Vol. 4	42
2000	Shanta Nadita Aaj	Sandhya Mukherjee and Saikat Mitra	Pulak Bandyopadhyay	Reenmukti (Note: Also spelled as Rinmukti.)	43
2000	Pete Parle Maal	Manna Dey	Pulak Bandyopadhyay	Reenmukti	44
2000	Jakhan Bristi Ase	Sandhya Mukherjee	Pulak Bandyopadhyay	Reenmukti	45
2000	Bhabte Parini Purnima Chand	Haimanti Shukla and Santanu Roy Chowdhury	Pulak Bandyopadhyay	Reenmukti	46
2000	Ami Chanchal Ami Jharna	Lopamudra Mitra	Abhijit Banerjee	Reenmukti	47
2001	Amay Jodi Hathat Kono Chhale	Tarun Banerjee	Premendra Mitra	Nirbachito Kabyageeti Kabita Theke Gaan Cd-2	48
2001	Tomra Sabai Anko Kasho	Tarun Banerjee	Premendra Mitra	Nirbachito Kabyageeti Kabita Theke Gaan Cd-2	49
2001	O Phul Phutli Keno	Sumitra Sen	Abhijit Banerjee	Anyo Gan Sagar Sen	50
2001	Saradin Tomake Khunjechhi	Sumitra Sen	Abhijit Banerjee	Anyo Gan Sagar Sen	51
2002	Aasa Jaoyar Pathe Pathe	Subhodeep Mukherjee	Pulak Bandyopadhyay	Moner Akash - Suvodeep Mukherjee	52
2005	O Parul Parul Shimul Shimul	Gayatri Basu	Abhijit Banerjee	Gaan Bala - Lopamudra And Srikanto Achariya Vol 1	53
2005	Surje Roudre Puriye	Arun Dutta	Abhijit Banerjee	Gaan Bala - Lopamudra And Srikanto Achariya Vol 1	54
2005	Jodi Bhul Kichhu Kore Thaki	Subir Sen	Miltoo Ghosh	Gaan Bala - Lopamudra And Srikanto Achariya Vol 1	55
2005	E Shudhu Tomar Amare Loye	Basabi Nandi	Sree Shankar	Gaan Bala - Lopamudra And Srikanto Achariya Vol 1	56
