= Sudhin Dasgupta =

Indian music director and lyricist (1929–1982)

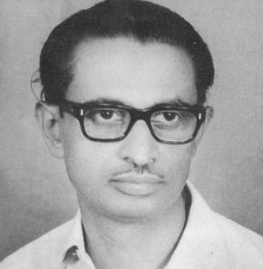

Background information
- Also known as: Sudhin Dasgupta
- Born: Sudhindranath Dasgupta; 9 October 1929; Darjeeling, Bengal Presidency, British India (now West Bengal, India)
- Origin: West Bengal
- Died: 10 January 1982 (aged 52) Calcutta, West Bengal, India
- Genres: World; pop
- Occupations: Composer, lyricist, singer
- Instrument: vocal
- Years active: 1950–1982

Talat Mahmood singing "Ei rim jhim jhim Boroshay"
Music composer and Lyricist Sudhin Dasgupta, Singer Talat Mahmood

Sudhin Dasgupta (9 October 1929 – 10 January 1982) was an Indian music director, lyricist and singer. He primarily worked in Bengali music, but also contributed to various other Indian languages, such as Hindi, Assamese and Oriya.

== Personal life ==
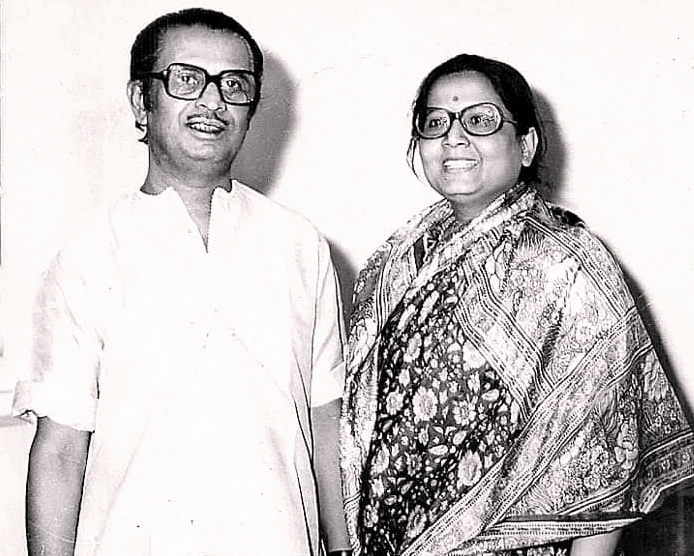
Sudhin Dasgupta with Manjushree Dasgupta

Born into a Baidya family on 9 October 1929, Sudhindranath dasgupta, popularly known as Sudhin Dasgupta, was brought up at Darjeeling. The ancestral house of his family was in 'Kalia' village, Jessore District, Bangladesh. His father, Mahendranath Dasgupta was a teacher at Darjeeling Govt. School. His mother was a social activist in those days.

Sudhindranath, alias Sudhin Dasgupta, was proficient in music from his early years. He could play various types of musical instruments with equal expertise, such as Sitar, Sarod, Harmonium, Piano, Mandolin, Piccolo, Guitar, Violin, Esraj etc., along with percussion such as Tabla and Drums. He graduated in music from Royal School of Music London.

Sudhin was also adept in playing various games. When he was in Calcutta (Kolkata) he was a member of the Hockey team in Bhabanipur Club.

It was 1949–50 when Sudhin and his family had to shift permanently to Calcutta (Kolkata), initially at Srinath Mukherjee Lane and then to the house at Sinthi. This was the time when he gradually delved into the world of Bengali modern music. Apart from working as music assistant to the legendary music director Kamal Dasgupta, he maintained his responsibility of creating songs for the Calcutta North Squad of IPTA (Indian Peoples Theatres' Association). And a day came when Sudhin met Khitish Basu of the Gramophone Company of India who gave him the opportunity to compose Bengali modern music. The first two modern songs composed by him was Kato Asha Kato Bhalobasha and Keno Akash Hote recorded by Bechu Dutta in 1953. Eventually the versatile musical journey of Sudhin Dasgupta began which was consistent until the last day of his life.

Sudhin Dasgupta was married to Manjushree Dasgupta (née Sengupta). Their son Soumya is an architect by profession, and daughter Saberi is a fashion designer.

== Music ==
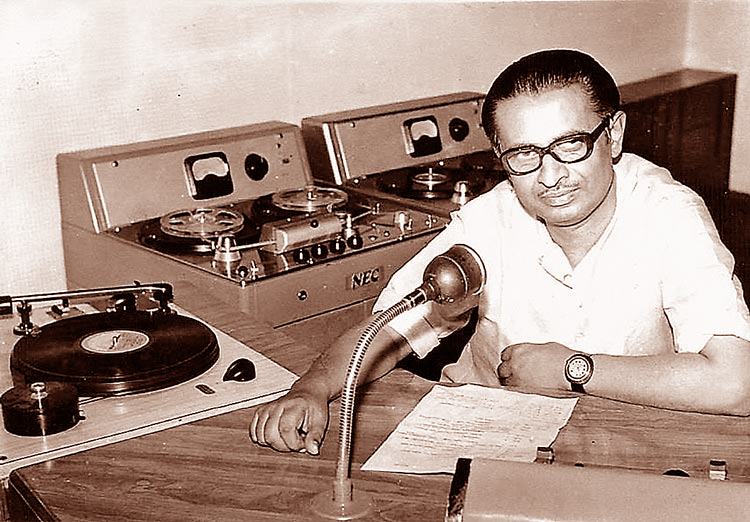
Sudhin Dasgupta as the Station Master at All India Radio

The years of the 1950s, 1960s, and 1970s are considered as the golden era for Bengali modern song as well as Bengali basic song. During this period, Bengali music was enriched by contributions of numerous music directors and lyricists such as Gouri Prasanna Majumdar, Pulak Bandyopadhyay, Shyamal Gupta, Miltoo Ghosh, Pronob Roy, Robin Chattopadhyay, Pabitra Chattopadhyay, Anol Chattopadhyay, Anupam Ghatak, Anil Bagchi, Jnan Prakash Ghosh, Salil Chowdhury, Nachiketa Ghosh, Hemanta Kumar Mukhopadhyay, Shyamal Mitra, Bhupen Hazarika and Sudhin Dasgupta. He was also known to be an excellent player of different Indian and Western musical instruments like Tabla, Sitar, Piano, Harmonium, Esraj, Violin and others.

Early years

Some time during early fifties, Sudhin Dasgupta was invited by Geeta Dutt and Guru Dutt to join their production house in Bombay (Mumbai). For some time Subir Sen and Sudhin Dasgupta stayed together in Tardeo Sonawala building in Mumbai when Sudhin composed a song "এত সুর আর এত গান" (Eto sur aar eto gaan), which was recorded by Subir Sen much later. By this time the second record of Subir Sen appeared in 1956 containing two compositions of Sudhin Dasgupta, 'ঐ উজ্জ্বল দিন ডাকে স্বপ্ন রঙ্গীন' and 'স্বর্ণঝরা সূর্যরঙে'. These immortal creations made the Composer cum lyricist Sudhin Dasgupta famous and made a permanent place for him in the world of Bengali music.

Since his early years Sudhin Dasgupta was associated with the activities of IPTA (Indian People's Theatre Association), where his was befriended with many stalwarts of that time, such as Salil Chowdhury, Sourindra Mohan Sengupta, Ritwik Ghatak, Utpal Dutt, Khwaja Ahmad Abbas, Pandit Ravi Shankar, Jyotirindra Moitra, Debabrata Biswas and others. During this time Sudhin Dasgupta composed music for Thikana, a famous poem written by Sukanta Bhattacharya, which was sung at IPTA meetings by Sourindra Mohan during the Teachers' Movement in 1954. However, later another version of the song with music composed by Salil Choudhury was recorded and became very popular.

Sudhin had a professional voice too, and the lone record of his songs written by his close friend Subir Hazra was published in 1961 with two tracks: 'কোকিল কাঁদে কেন ফাগুনে’ based on folk tune, and 'লাল লাল চোখে দেখি একে ওকে’ with the tune of jazz.

Composer of Basic Songs

The first Bengali song recorded in Sudhin's composition were in Bechu Dutta's voice: 'কত আশা কত ভালোবাসা' and 'কেন আকাশ হতে' in 1953. In basic Bengali song, Sudhin Dasgupta gifted the audience a number of super-hit tracks, including "Ei Jhir Jhir Batase", "Bhanga Torir Sudhu E Gaan", "Ami Taar Thikana Rakhini", "Ekta Gaan Likho Amar Jonno", "Oi Ujjwalo Din", "Saat Ronga Ek Pakhi", "Akash Eto Meghla", "Naam Rekhechi Bonolata" and many others. Again, he contributed both as composer and lyricist in many of the items. He worked extensively with all the legendary singers like Hemanta Kumar Mukhopadhyay, Manna Dey, Dwijen Mukhopadhyay, Shyamal Mitra, Manabendra Mukhopadhyay, Satinath Mukhopadhyay, Sandhya Mukhopadhyay, Pratima Bandopadhyay, Arati Mukhopadhyay, Talat Mahmood, Lata Mangeshkar, Asha Bhonsle, Mohammed Rafi etc. In the year 1967 itself both Sudhin and Salil presented Puja Albums containing ten songs each, such was the popularity of the duo.

Composer/Music Director in Movies

In 1957, Sudhin Dasgupta entered the Bengali Film industry as the music composer for film called "Ulka". His second film was "Dak Harkara" (1958), where famous Bengali novelist, Tarashankar Bandopadhyay contributed the lyrics. Sudhin never looked back and Bengali film industry got a series of mega hits from him like "Antaral", "Shankhabela", "Tin Bhuboner Pare", "Prothom Kodom Phul", "Chaddabeshi", "Picnic", "Har Mana Har", "Basanta Bilap", "Hangsaraj", "Amrito Kumbher Sondhane" and many more. In many of the films he acted both as the lyricist and the composer. He worked for around fifty Bengali films. While composing music for the film "Goli Theke Rajpoth" Sudhin inducted Manne Dey for the first time to make play back song in the lip of Uttam Kumar, in the song "লাগ লাগ লাগ ভেল্কির খেলা". The great trio, Sudhin Dasgupta, Uttam Kumar and Manna Dey produced several magical songs in films "Shankhabela", "Kokhono Megh", "Manjari Opera", "Chhadmabeshi", "Har Mana Har", "Raater Rajanigandha" etc. afterwards.

Experimentation

Sudhin Dasgupta experimented with different forms of music all through his musical career. He used Baul, South Indian Tunes, Folk, and Western Chorus in his various creations. Sometimes he adopted tune of various origin into his creations. In Shyamal Mitra's voice "Kato dur kato dur" he used the tune of "Jingle bells". One such song was "I come from Alabama" which inspired the Bengali song Oi meghe meghe, sang by Gayatri Basu in 1954. In the same year Sudhin composed Mor gaan shishirer khora sure go, sang by Sandhya Mukherjee, which could be inspired by Tchaikovsky's composition Danse Choinoise (1882), having a faint resemblance in the first line only. He created the song "হারিয়ে ফেলেছি মন জানি না তো কোথায় কখন" based on "Casanova".

Advertisement jingles

Sudhin Dasgupta also worked for commercial advertisement jingles. One such composition by Sudhin has become a legend: "Mathar Ghonochul Jokhon, Morubhumi Hoye Jai…”.

Music for Children

He contributed to the music albums for the children, titled "Hingsute Doitto" and "Chotoder Ramayan".

He also composed music for many of the well-known Bengali poems from authors like Sunirmal Basu, Jogindranath Sarkar, Jatindranath Sengupta ('থই থই শাওন এল ওই' by Sandhya Mukherjee), Batakrishna Dey ('কৃষ্ণচূড়া আগুন তুমি’ by Geeta Dutt) and Jatindra Mohan Bagchi ('বাঁশবাগানের মাথার ওপর' by Pratima Bandopadhyay) etc.

Sudhin as a poet

Sudhin Dasgupta wrote lyrics for many songs. Immense popularity of these songs itself speak of the poetical values of these lyrics with their literary value. One of the first of his creations was the song he wrote for Subir Sen in 1954, Eto Sur Ar Eto Gaan, which had become a milestone in Bengali music world:

এত সুর আর এত গান যদি কোনদিন থেমে যায়
সেইদিন তুমিও তো ওগো জানি ভুলে যাবে যে আমায়।

কতদিন আর এ জীবন কত আর এ মধু লগন...
তবুও তো পেয়েছি তোমায় জানি ভুলে যাবে যে আমায়।

আমি তো গেয়েছি সেই গান যে গানে দিয়েছিলে প্রাণ...।
ক্ষতি নেই আজ কিছু আর ভুলেছি যত কিছু তার...
এ জীবনে সবই যে হারায়, জানি ভুলে যাবে যে আমায়।.

Sudhin as a social worker and reformer

Sudhin Dasgupta actively responded through his pen to the distress of people in the time of partition in 1947 and afterwards. He created a few motivational songs during that time for the IPTA. During the Bangladesh war in 1971 too he created unforgettable songs paying homage to the birth of the New Nation and its founder Bangabandhu Sheikh Mujibur Rahman: Bangabandhu phire ele.

== Bengali filmography ==
List of all Films for which Music or Lyrics were composed by Sudhin Dasgupta

Sudhin Dasgupta Filmography
Year	Film	Director	Casting	Playback Singers	Lyrics	Music Composer
1957	Ulka	Naresh Mitra	Sunanda Banerjee, Satya Bannerjee, Jiben Bose, Sabita Bose			Sudhin Dasgupta
1958	Dak Harkara		Biswajeet, Sabitri Chatterjee, Kali Banerjee, Sova Sen		Tarashankar Bandopadhyay	Sudhin Dasgupta
1959	Gali Thekey Rajpath					Sudhin Dasgupta
1959	Headmaster					Sudhin Dasgupta
1960	Probesh Nisedh					Sudhin Dasgupta
1960	Jatri					Sudhin Dasgupta
1961	Panka Tilak					Sudhin Dasgupta
1962	Kanna					Sudhin Dasgupta
1963	Nishithe					Sudhin Dasgupta
1964	Tahole					Sudhin Dasgupta
1964	Dui Parba					Sudhin Dasgupta
1965	Akash Kusum received President's award (Silver Medal)	Mrinal Sen	Soumitra Chatterjee, Aparna Sen, Shuvendu Chatterjee			Sudhin Dasgupta
1965	Antaral					Sudhin Dasgupta
1966	Shankhabela				Pulak Bandopadhyay	Sudhin Dasgupta
1967	Akash Chhoa					Sudhin Dasgupta
1967	Abhishapta Chambal					Sudhin Dasgupta
1968	Kokhono Megh	Agradoot	Uttam Kumar, Anjana Bhowmick, Kali Banerjee, Subrota Chatterje		Sudhin Dasgupta	Sudhin Dasgupta
1969	Tin Bhuboner Pare	Asutosh Banerjee	Soumitra Chatterjee, Tanuja, Kamal Mitra		Pulak Bandopadhyay	Sudhin Dasgupta
1970	Prothom Kadam Phool					Sudhin Dasgupta
1970	Manjari Opera					Sudhin Dasgupta
1971	Joi Bangla					Sudhin Dasgupta
1971	Chhadmabeshi					Sudhin Dasgupta
1972	Jiban Saikate				Sudhin Dasgupta	Sudhin Dasgupta
1972	Picnic					Sudhin Dasgupta
1972	Jabaan	Palash Banerjee	Samit Bhanja, Radha Saluja, Amitabh Bachchan, Biswajeet, Dharmendra, Shatrughan Sinha			Sudhin Dasgupta
1972	Har Mana Har	Salil Sen	Uttam Kumar, Suchitra Sen, Pahari Sanyal		Pulak Bandopadhyay	Sudhin Dasgupta
1972	Rater Rojonigandha					Sudhin Dasgupta
1972	Shajarur Kanta					Sudhin Dasgupta
1973	Sonar Khancha				Sudhin Dasgupta	
1973	Basanta Bilap	Dinen Gupta	Soumitra Chatterjee, Aparna Sen, Rabi Ghosh, Chinmoy Roy, Sumitra Devi, Anup Kumar, Kajal Gupta		Pulak Bandopadhyay	Sudhin Dasgupta
1973	Nishi Konna					Sudhin Dasgupta
1973	Ek Je Chilo Bagh					Sudhin Dasgupta
1973	Epar Opar		Soumitra Chatterjee, Dilip Roy, Aparna Sen, Shamita Biswas		Sudhin Dasgupta	Sudhin Dasgupta
1973	Jiban Rahasya	Salil Roy	Shuvendu Chatterjee, Madhabi Mukherjee, Pran	Asha Bhosle, Manna Dey	Pulak Bandopadhyay	Abhijit Banerjee (Sudhin Dasgupta composed music for songs)
1973	Shajarur Kanta					Sudhin Dasgupta
1974	Prantarekha					Sudhin Dasgupta
1974	Sangini					Sudhin Dasgupta
1975	Sharmila					Sudhin Dasgupta
1975	Sedin Dujone					Sudhin Dasgupta
1975	Palanka					Sudhin Dasgupta
1975	Hangsaraaj		Master Arindam, Kali Banerjee, Sandhyarani		Pulak Bandopadhyay	Sudhin Dasgupta
1976	Aparajita					Sudhin Dasgupta
1978	Karunamoyee					Sudhin Dasgupta
1979	Dour					Sudhin Dasgupta
1979	Job Charnoker Bibi					Sudhin Dasgupta
1979	Suvo Sangbad					Sudhin Dasgupta
1982	Pipasa					Sudhin Dasgupta
1982	Amrita Kumbher Sandhane					Sudhin Dasgupta
1983	Suporna					Sudhin Dasgupta
1983	Banashree					Sudhin Dasgupta

== Discography ==
List of all songs for which Music or Lyrics were composed by Sudhin Dasgupta

Sudhin Dasgupta Discography
Year	Song	Singer	Language	Film/album	Lyrics	Music
19-	Anek durer pranto sheshe	Salil Mitra	Bengali	Akashvani Ramyageeti	Sudhin Dasgupta	Sudhin Dasgupta
-	Ashather chayatol	Sachin Gupta	Bengali		Sailen Roy	Sudhin Dasgupta
1961	Aandhar majhe tomar o rup	Lata Mangeskar	Bengali	Panka Tilak	-	Sudhin Dasgupta
1976	Aah ki jwala dyakh na sokhi	Arundhati Holme Choudhury	Bengali	-	Dinendra Choudhury	Sudhin Dasgupta
1963	Aaha mon kemon kemon	Satinath Bandopadhyay	Bengali	Puja Album	Sudhin Dasgupta	Sudhin Dasgupta
1970	Aaj holi khelbo Shyam	Sandhya Mukherjee	Bengali	Manjari Opera	-	Sudhin Dasgupta
1966	Aaj mon cheyechhe ami hariye jabo	Lata Mangeskar	Bengali	Shankhabela	-	Sudhin Dasgupta
1967	Aaj shudhu khela	Banasri Sengupta	Bengali	Puja Album	-	Sudhin Dasgupta
1961	Aajo mone pore baare baare	Hemanta Mukherjee	Bengali	Shilalipi	Subir Hazra	Sudhin Dasgupta
1965	Aakash jekhane galpo bale	Subir	Bengali	Puja Album	Sudhin Dasgupta	Sudhin Dasgupta
1958	Aakashe aaj ronger khelaa (first Bengali song by Asha Bhonsle)	Asha Bhonsle	Bengali	Puja Album	Sudhin Dasgupta	Sudhin Dasgupta
19-	Aakashe takalam	Chorus	Bengali	Akashvani Ramyageeti	Sudhin Dasgupta	Sudhin Dasgupta
19-	Aamar baaju bandher jhumko	Sandhya Mukherjee	Bengali	-	Tarashankar Bandyopadhyay	Sudhin Dasgupta
1971	Aamar din kate na	Asha Bhonsle	Bengali	Chadmabeshi	-	Sudhin Dasgupta
1973	Aami andhakaarer jatri	Asha Bhonsle	Bengali	Epar Opar	Sudhin Dasgupta	Sudhin Dasgupta
1972	Aami bhalo hote paari	Banasree Sengupta	Bengali	Puja Album	Sudhin Dasgupta	Sudhin Dasgupta
1972	Aami jeno tar-i alo	Arati Mukherjee	Bengali	Har mana har	Pulak Bandopadhyay	Sudhin Dasgupta
1971	Aami kon pothe je choli	Manna Dey	Bengali	Chadmabeshi	-	Sudhin Dasgupta
1974	Aami lukate parini	Sandhya Mukherjee	Bengali	-	Subir Hazra	Sudhin Dasgupta
1973	Aami Miss Calcutta 1976	Arati Mukherjee	Bengali	Basanta Bilap	-	Sudhin Dasgupta
1970	Aami Shri Shri Bhajahari Manna	Manna Dey	Bengali	Prothom Kadam Phool	Pulak Bandopadhyay	Sudhin Dasgupta
1968	Aami taar thikana rakhini	Manna Dey	Bengali	Puja Album	Pulak Bandopadhyay	Sudhin Dasgupta
-	Aami toh haat bariyechhilam	Sujata Sarkar	Bengali	Puja Album	Dilip Ghosh	Sudhin Dasgupta
1976	Aami toh tomar chirodiner	Nirmala Mishra	Bengali	Puja Album	Babu Guhathakurta	Sudhin Dasgupta
1971	Aaro dure chalo jai	Asha Bhonsle	Bengali	Chadmabeshi	-	Sudhin Dasgupta
19-	Aaro dure dure chalona	Banashree Sengupta	Bengali	Akashvani Ramyageeti	Sudhin Dasgupta	Sudhin Dasgupta
1966	Aaro kato din ami khunjechhi tomake	Arati Mukherjee	Bengali	-	Sudhin Dasgupta	Sudhin Dasgupta
1983	Aaswine hok aghraane hok	Hementa Mukherjee	Bengali	Banasree	Pulak Bandopadhyay	Sudhin Dasgupta
-	Aaynate mukh dekhbo na	Arati Mukherjee	Bengali	-	Subir Hazra	Sudhin Dasgupta
1971	Banchao ke achho	Manna Dey	Bengali	Chadmabeshi	Subir Hazra	Sudhin Dasgupta
1961	Bandho chokhhe mor dao alo	Sabita Choudhury	Bengali	Pankatilak	Subir Hazra	Sudhin Dasgupta
1971	Banga Bandhu phire ele	Sandhya Mukherjee	Bengali	Poem converted to song	Abidur Rahaman	Sudhin Dasgupta
1955	Bansh baganer mathar opor	Pratima Bandopadhyay	Bengali	Poem converted to song	Jatindra Mohan Bagchi	Sudhin Dasgupta
1972	Banyo banyo e aranyo	Arati Mukherjee	Bengali	Puja Album	Sunil Baran	Sudhin Dasgupta
1968	Bhule jete tumi parbe ki	Ila Basu	Bengali	Puja Album	Sudhin Dasgupta	Sudhin Dasgupta
1956	Bideshini kaader raani	Alpana Bandyopadhyay	Bengali	Puja Album	Bhaskar Basu	Sudhin Dasgupta
-	Bolte tumi paaro	Arati Mukherjee	Bengali	-	Sudhin Dasgupta	Sudhin Dasgupta
1973	Chalo aaj kichhu poth	Nirmala Mishra	Bengali	Puja Album	Barun Biswas	Sudhin Dasgupta
1960	Champa aamar ogo shono	Tarun Bandyopadhyay	Bengali	-	Salil Chowdhuri	Sudhin Dasgupta
1957	Champaar chokhe jeno kaar maya	-	Bengali	Ulka	Gauriprasanna Mazumder and Kanu Ranjan Ghosh	Sudhin Dasgupta
1963	ChaaNder aloy raater paakhi	Sailen Mukhopadhyay	Bengali	Puja album	Pulak Bandyopadhyay	Sudhin Dasgupta
1962	Chaar deyaler modhye nanan drishyo ke	Manna Dey	Bengali	Puja album	Sudhin Dasgupta	Sudhin Dasgupta
1971	Chho chho chho kya sharam ki baaNt	Ranjit Roy (comedian)	Bengali	Chadmabeshi	Sudhin Dasgupta	Sudhin Dasgupta
1962	China chena mukh	Dhananjoy Bhattacharya	Bengali	Puja album	Sunil Baran	Sudhin Dasgupta
1971	Chhi Chhi Chhi e ki kando	Banasree Sengupta	Bengali		Barun Biswas	Sudhin Dasgupta
1966	Chinechhe chinechhi tomar e mon	Arati Mukherjee	Bengali	Puja Album	Sudhin Dasgupta	Sudhin Dasgupta
1958	Chokher najar	Shyamal Mitra	Bengali	Puja Album	Sudhin Dasgupta	Sudhin Dasgupta
1969	Deke deke chole gechhi	Asha Bhonsle	Bengali	Prothom Kadam Phool	Sudhin Dasgupta	Sudhin Dasgupta
1973	Dekheo je dekhe na	Arundhati Home Choudhury	Bengali	Puja Album	Sudhin Dasgupta	Sudhin Dasgupta
1969	Dibasa rajani jay jeno emoni	Satinath Mukhopadhay	Bengali	Puja Album	Sudhin Dasgupta	Sudhin Dasgupta
1969	Dure dure kachhe kachhe	Arati Mukherjee	Bengali	Teen Bhubaner Pare	-	Sudhin Dasgupta
1961	E amay kothay niye ele	Lata Mangeskar	Bengali	Pankatilak	Subir Hazra	Sudhin Dasgupta
1972	Ei akash natun bathash natun	Arati Mukherjee	Bengali	Har Mana Har	Pulak Bandopadhyay	Sudhin Dasgupta
1958	Ei chhaya bithi tole	Utpala Sen	Bengali		Bhaskar Basu	Sudhin Dasgupta
1950	Ei chhaya ghera kalo raat	Dwijen Mukherjee	Bengali		Sudhin Dasgupta	Sudhin Dasgupta
1972	Ei pothe pashapashi	Manna Dey, Krishna Bhanja	Bengali	Jaban	Sudhin Dasgupta	Sudhin Dasgupta
1957	Ei rat nijhhum	Nilima Bandyopadhyay	Bengali		Sudhin Dasgupta	Sudhin Dasgupta
1958	Ei rim jhim jhim barosha	Talat Mahmood	Bengali		Sudhin Dasgupta	Sudhin Dasgupta
1970	Ei shahar theke aro onek dure	Manna Dey	Bengali	Prothom Kadam Phool	Sudhin Dasgupta	Sudhin Dasgupta
1967	Ei shahare ei bandare	Shyamal Mitra	Bengali	Puja Album	-	Sudhin Dasgupta
1973	Ek choretei thanda	Arati Mukherjee	Bengali	Basanta Bilap	-	Sudhin Dasgupta
1972	Ek din dal bendhe	Manna Dey	Bengali	Picnic	-	Sudhin Dasgupta
1970	Ek din sei din	Banasree Sengupta	Bengali	Puja Album	Sudhin Dasgupta	Sudhin Dasgupta
1962	Ek jhhank pakhider mato	Manna Dey	Bengali	Puja album	Sudhin Dasgupta	Sudhin Dasgupta
1959	Ek-i onge eto rup	Manna Dey	Bengali	Puja album	Sudhin Dasgupta	Sudhin Dasgupta
1962	Ekta gaan likho aamar jonyo	Pratima Bandopadhyay	Bengali		Subir Hazra	Sudhin Dasgupta
1958	Ektu chhNoya aar ektu paaoya	Geeta Dutt	Bengali		Amitava Naha	Sudhin Dasgupta
1964	Elomelo haoyay hariye jete chay	Shyamal Mitra	Bengali	Tahole	Sudhin Dasgupta	Sudhin Dasgupta
1964	Emon madhur dhwani	Dhananjay Bhattacharya	Bengali	Puja Album	Sunil Baran	Sudhin Dasgupta
1955	Epaare Ganga opaare Ganga	Pratima Bandyopadhyay	Bengali	Akashvani Ramyageeti	Bhaskar Basu	Sudhin Dasgupta
1972	Esechhi Aladin	Manna Dey	Bengali	Puja Album	Sudhin Dasgupta	Sudhin Dasgupta
1976	Esona tomay kato misti kore	Sipra Bose	Bengali	Haar mana haar	Sudhin Dasgupta	Sudhin Dasgupta
1967	Eto kore kaachhe daaki	Banasri Sengupta	Bengali	Puja Album	-	Sudhin Dasgupta
1957	Eto sur aar eto gaan	Subir Sen	Bengali	Puja album	Sudhin Dasgupta	Sudhin Dasgupta
1968	Hariye jete jete	Arati Mukherjee	Bengali	Kakhono Megh	Sudhin Dasgupta	Sudhin Dasgupta
19-	Hariye phelechhi mon	Mrinal Chakraborty	Bengali	Puja Album	Sudhin Dasgupta	Sudhin Dasgupta
19-	Hira phele kaaNch	Banashree Sengupta	Bengali	-	Sudhin Dasgupta	Sudhin Dasgupta
1969	Hoyto tomari jonyo	Manna Dey	Bengali	Teen Bhubaner Pare	-	Sudhin Dasgupta
19-	Ja re ja re barasare	Sabita Chowdhury	Bengali		Sudhin Dasgupta	Sudhin Dasgupta
1957	Jhiri jhiri chaitali batase	Geeta Dutt	Bengali	Puja Album	Sudhin Dasgupta	Sudhin Dasgupta
1967	Jhum jhumke naacho re	Manna Dey, Mrinal Chakraborty, Chorus	Hindi	Abhisapta Chambal	Sudhin Dasgupta	Sudhin Dasgupta
1967	Jodi akash hoto ankhi	Arati Mukherjee	Bengali	Puja Album	Pulak Bandopadhyay	Sudhin Dasgupta
1957	Jodi e raate tumi thako sathe	-	Bengali	Ulka	Gauriprasanna Mazumder and Kanu Ranjan Ghosh	Sudhin Dasgupta
1972	Jpdi prtem kore tumi	Manna Dey	Bengali	Jaban	Sudhin Dasgupta	Sudhin Dasgupta
1969	Jibone Ki Pabo Na	Manna Dey	Bengali	Teen Bhubaner Pare	-	Sudhin Dasgupta
1986	Kabe tomay dekhechhi	Sujata Sarkar	Bengali	-	Pulak Bandopadhyay	Sudhin Dasgupta
1953	Kato asha kato bhalobasa	Bechu Datta	Bengali	-	Arup Bhattacharya	Sudhin Dasgupta
1967	Katodin je khnuje gelam	Mrinal Chakraborty	Bengali	Puja Album	Sudhin Dasgupta	Sudhin Dasgupta
1958	Kaacher churir chhota	Geeta Dutt	Bengali	Dak Harkara	Tarashankar Bandopadhyay	Sudhin Dasgupta
1960	Kaachhe ese chole jao	Ila Basu	Bengali	Puja Album	Sudhin Dasgupta	Sudhin Dasgupta
1956	Kaajol kaajol kumkum	Geeta Dutt	Bengali	-	Miltoo Ghosh	Sudhin Dasgupta
1970	Kaajol lata sara janam	-	Bengali	Manjari Opera	Tarashankar Bandyppadhyay	Sudhin Dasgupta
1974	Kaal tahole ei samoyei	Shyamal Mitra	Bengali	Puja Album	Sudhin Dasgupta	Sudhin Dasgupta
1968	Kaane kane sei kothati	Ila Basu	Bengali	Puja Album	Sudhin Dasgupta	Sudhin Dasgupta
1961	Kaar kotha bhebe bhebe		Bengali	Shila Lipi	-	Sudhin Dasgupta
1958	Kaar manjiro baaje	Shyamal Mitra	Bengali	Puja Album	Sudhin Dasgupta	Sudhin Dasgupta
19-	Ke jeno aamar	Jatileswar Mukherjee	Bengali		Subir Hazra	Sudhin Dasgupta
1969	Ke jeno duti haate	Pratima Bandyopadhyay	Bengali		Barun Bswas	Sudhin Dasgupta
1966	Ke pratham kachhe esechhi	Lata Mangeskar & Manna Dey	Bengali	Shankhabela	-	Sudhin Dasgupta
1959	Ke go tumi dakle amare	Asha Bhonsle	Bengali	Goli Thekey Rajpath	Gauriprasanna Mazumder	Sudhin Dasgupta
1969	Ke tumi nandini	Manna Dey	Bengali	Teen Bhubaner Pare	-	Sudhin Dasgupta
19-	Kemone taare daaki	Arati Mukherjee	Bengali	Akashvani Ramyageeti	Sudhin Dasgupta	Sudhin Dasgupta
1953	Keno akash hote	Bechu Datta	Bengali	-	Arup Bhattacharya	Sudhin Dasgupta
1967	Keno daako isharay	Asha Bhonsle	Bengali	Abhisapta Chambal	Sudhin Dasgupta	Sudhin Dasgupta
1965	Keno tumi phire ele	Shyamal Mitra	Bengali	-	Sudhin Dasgupta	Sudhin Dasgupta
1972	Keno sarbonasher nesha	Asha Bhonsle	Bengali	Picnic	Pulak Bandopadhyay	Sudhin Dasgupta
1965	Ki bhalo laglo chokhe	Subir Sen	Bengali	Puja Album	Sunil Baran	Sudhin Dasgupta
1961	Ki jaadu jaane	Manna Dey, Geeta Dutt	Bengali	Pankatilak	-	Sudhin Dasgupta
1967	Ki naame deke	Shyamal Mitra	Bengali	Puja Album	Sudhin Dasgupta	Sudhin Dasgupta
1955	Klanti jodi naame	Supriti Ghosh	Bengali	Puja Album	Sudhin Dasgupta	Sudhin Dasgupta
1961	Kokil kande keno phagune	Sudhin Dasgupta	Bengali	Puja album	Subir Hazra	Sudhin Dasgupta
1976	Kolkata	Amit Kumar	Bengali	Hangsaraj	Pulak Bandopadhyay	Sudhin Dasgupta
1969	Kon se alor swapna niye	Asha Bhonsle	Bengali	Prothom Kadam Phool	Sudhin Dasgupta	Sudhin Dasgupta
-	Kono ek chena pothe	Arati Mukherjee	Bengali	Teen Bhubaner Pare	Pulak Bandopadhyay	Sudhin Dasgupta
1959	Laag laag velkir khela	Manna Dey	Bengali	Goli theke raajpoth	Gauriprasanna Mazumder	Sudhin Dasgupta
1958	Lal pagri bedhe mathe	Manna Dey	Bengali	Dak Harkara	Tarashankar Bandopadhyay	Sudhin Dasgupta
1961	Lal lal chokhe dekhi eke oke	Sudhin Dasgupta	Bengali	Puja album	Subir Hazra	Sudhin Dasgupta
1972	Lekha porata shikey tule	Manna Dey	Bengali	Har mana har	Pulak Bandopadhyay	Sudhin Dasgupta
-	Lolite aagei jodi	Arati Mukherjee	Bengali	-	Sudhin Dasgupta	Sudhin Dasgupta
1970	Maron tomar haar holo je	Manna Dey	Bengali	Manjari Opera	Tarashankar Bandyppadhyay	Sudhin Dasgupta
1959	Meghla meye megheri saaj porechhe	Manna Dey	Bengali	Puja album	Sudhin Dasgupta	Sudhin Dasgupta
19-	Mon jodi hoy kaNcher ghor	Banashree Sengupta	Bengali	-	Sudhin Dasgupta	Sudhin Dasgupta
1972	Mon metechhe mon mayurir	Asha Bonsle	Bengali	Picnic	Sudhin Dasgupta	Sudhin Dasgupta
1958	Mon re amar hay shunli na	Manna Dey	Bengali	Dak Harkara	Tarashankar Bandopadhyay	Sudhin Dasgupta
1954	Mor gaan shishirer khora sure go	Sandhya Mukherjee	Bengali	Puja Album	Sailen Roy	Sudhin Dasgupta
1967	Na bole esechhi ta bole	Arati Mukherjee	Bengali	Puja Album	Pulak Bandopadhyay	Sudhin Dasgupta
1958	Naach mayuri naach re (first Bengali song by Asha Bhonsle)	Asha Bonsle	Bengali	Puja Album	Sudhin Dasgupta	Sudhin Dasgupta
1973	Nao tumi jake ami khunjechhi	Manna Dey	Bengali	Rater Rajanigandha	-	Sudhin Dasgupta
1967	Naam rekhechhi banolata	Shyamal Mitra	Bengali		Sudhin Dasgupta	Sudhin Dasgupta
1958	Neel akasher oi kole	Shayamal Mitra	Bengali	I956-57	Sudhin Dasgupta	Sudhin Dasgupta
1972	Neel kagoje bujhina keno	Banasree Sangupta	Bengali		Sunil Baran	Sudhin Dasgupta
1960	Neel Neel Neel	Hemanta Mukherjee	Bengali	-	Premendra Mitra	Sudhin Dasgupta
1963	Neer bhenge jay jaak	Robin Bandyopadhyay	Bengali		Sudhin Dasgupta	Sudhin Dasgupta
1955	Nirjhorini jhirjhiriye	Supriti Ghosh	Bengali		Paresh Dhar	Sudhin Dasgupta
1957	O amar mayur ponkhi nao	-	Bengali	Ulka	Gauriprasanna Mazumder and Kanu Ranjan Ghosh	Sudhin Dasgupta
1976	O babumoshai	Arati Mukherjee	Bengali	Hangsaraaj	Pulak Bandopadhyay	Sudhin Dasgupta
-	O chokhe amay dekona	Arati Mukherjee	Bengali	-	Sudhin Dasgupta	Sudhin Dasgupta
1975	O didimoni	Arati Mukherjee	Bengali	Hangsaraaj	Pulak Bandopadhyay	Sudhin Dasgupta
1973	O shyam jakhon takhon	Arati Mukherjee & Sujata Mukherjee	Bengali	Basanta Bilap	-	Sudhin Dasgupta
1961	Ore baba baro baro	Manna Dey	Bengali	Pankatilak	-	Sudhin Dasgupta
19-	Ogo bihanga	Sandhya Mukherjee	Bengali	-	Sudhin Dasgupta	Sudhin Dasgupta
1955	Ogo Sucharita	Dhananjay Bhattacharya	Bengali	-	Sudhin Dasgupta	Sudhin Dasgupta
1958	Ogo tomar shesh bicharer ashay	Manna Dey	Bengali	Dak Harkara	Tarashankar Bandopadhyay	Sudhin Dasgupta
1954	Oi meghe meghe	Gayatri Basu	Bengali		Sudhin Dasgupta	Sudhin Dasgupta
1957	Oi ujjwalo din	Subir Sen	Bengali		Sudhin Dasgupta	Sudhin Dasgupta
1961	Ore baba baro baro chokhhe		Bengali	Pankatilak	-	Sudhin Dasgupta
1956	Otho otho Ma Gouri	Geeta Dutt	Bengali	-	Bhaskar Basu	Sudhin Dasgupta
-	Path nirjon chalona ekhon	Mrinal Chakraborty	Bengali	-	Sudhin Dasgupta	Sudhin Dasgupta
-	Paushali sondhya ghoom ghoom tandra	Alpana Banerjee	Bengali	-	Sudhin Dasgupta	Sudhin Dasgupta
1968	Paye paye hridoyer	Salil Mitra	Bengali	Akashvani Ramyageeti	Sudhin Dasgupta	Sudhin Dasgupta
1972	Paye paye joriye rakho	Manna Dey	Bengali	Har mana har	-	Sudhin Dasgupta
-	Phul jaage na jaage na	Shyamal Mitra	Bengali	Puja Album	Sudhin Dasgupta	Sudhin Dasgupta
1958	Phuler bone laglo je dol	Geeta Dutt	Bengali	Puja Album	Sudhin Dasgupta	Sudhin Dasgupta
1955	Phuler mato jiban	Tarun Bandopadhyay	Bengali	Puja Album	Sudhin Dasgupta	Sudhin Dasgupta
1974	Prem kora je eki	Shyamal Mitra	Bengali	Puja Album	Sudhin Dasgupta	Sudhin Dasgupta
1972	Raat ekhono anek baaki	Asha Bhonsle	Bengali	Jiban Saikate	Sudhin Dasgupta	Sudhin Dasgupta
-	Raatri je jay swapno phuray	Sachin Gupta	Bengali		Sailen Roy	Sudhin Dasgupta
1957	Rumjhum jhum jhum	Sandhya Mukherjee	Bengali	Puja Album	Sudhin Dasgupta	Sudhin Dasgupta
1958	Rup sagore dub	Hemanta Mukherjee	Bengali		Gauriprasanna Mazumder	Sudhin Dasgupta
1961	Rupali chaNd jhile jhilimili	Sandhya Mukherjee	Bengali		Sudhin Dasgupta	Sudhin Dasgupta
1955	Rupkathi gnaye shyamoli meyeti	Tarun Bandopadhyay	Bengali	Puja Album	Bahskar Basu	Sudhin Dasgupta
1975	Sahartar ei golok dhaNdhay	Arati Mukherjee	Bengali	Hangsaraaj	Pulak Bandopadhyay	Sudhin Dasgupta
1963	Saheli rup dekhali	Sailen Mukhopadhyay	Bengali	Puja album	Pulak Bandyopadhyay	Sudhin Dasgupta
1970	Sajani go rajanike	Pratima Bandopadhyay	Bengali	Puja Album	Miltu Ghosh	Sudhin Dasgupta
1972	Samay kakhan je	Hemanta Mukherjee	Bengali	Puja Album	-	Sudhin Dasgupta
1955	Sandhya bela nil akasher	Tarun Bandyopadhyay	Bengali	Shajarur Kanta	Sudhin Dasgupta	Sudhin Dasgupta
1967	Saiya ja re jar	Asha Bhonsle	Bengali	Abhisapta Chambal	Sudhin Dasgupta	Sudhin Dasgupta
1972	Saagar daake ay	Asha Bhonsle	Bengali	Jiban Saikate	Sudhin Dasgupta	Sudhin Dasgupta
1957	Saagar theke phera	Hemanta Mukherjee	Bengali	Poem converted to song	Premendra Mitra	Sudhin Dasgupta
1962	Saagare tumi jaar	Satinath Mukherjee	Bengali	-	Pabitra Mitra	Sudhin Dasgupta
19-	Se chhilo aamar	Jatileswar Mukherjee	Bengali	-	Ajay Bhattacharya	Sudhin Dasgupta
1977	Shono bose chupchap	Manna Dey	Bengali	Hingsute Daityo	Bhaskar Bosu	Sudhin Dasgupta
1983	Shudhu ekti premer gaane	Arati Mukherjee	Bengali	Banasree	Pulak Bandopadhyay	Sudhin Dasgupta
19-	Sonar haate sonar kakon	Satinath Mukherjee	Bengali	-	Bhaskar Basu	Sudhin Dasgupta
1957	Swarno jhora suryo ronge	Subir Sen	Bengali		Sudhin Dasgupta	Sudhin Dasgupta
1962	Tapur tupur sara dupur	Arati Mukherjee	Bengali	-	Sunil Baran	Sudhin Dasgupta
1962	Tar churite je rekhechhi	Manabendra Mukherjee	Bengali	-	Sudhin Dasgupta	Sudhin Dasgupta
1969	Tere liye aya hain le ke koi dil	Geeta Dutt	Hindi	Goli theke raajpoth	Gauriprasanna Mazumder	Sudhin Dasgupta
19-	Tomar amar thikana Padma Meghna Jamuna	Chorus	Bengali	-	Shibdas Bandyopadhyay	Sudhin Dasgupta
1972	Tomar deher bhongima ti	Manna Dey	Bengali	Har mana har	-	Sudhin Dasgupta
1967	Tomar deoya aungurio	Pratima Bandopadhyay	Bengali	Puja Album	Miltu Ghosh	Sudhin Dasgupta
1965	Tomar samaadhi phule phule dhaka	Shyamal Mitra	Bengali	Antaraal	Sunil Baran	Sudhin Dasgupta
1958	Tomare parini je bhulite	Talat Mahmood	Bengali		Sudhin Dasgupta	Sudhin Dasgupta
1957	Tomare peyechhi bole	Shyamal Mitra	Bengali	N82743	Sudhin Dasgupta	Sudhin Dasgupta
1971	Tomaye ekta rumal jakhon	Pintu Bhattacharya	Bengali	Puja Album	Barun Biswas	Sudhin Dasgupta
1981	Tomay dekhe chhobi eNke	Arati Mukherjee	Bengali	Kakhono Megh	Sudhin Dasgupta	Sudhin Dasgupta
1975	Tiya tiya tiya	Shyamasree Mazumder	Bengali	Hangsaraaj	Pulak Bandopadhyay	Sudhin Dasgupta
1965	Tumi chole jabar por	Shyaml Mitra	Bengali	Puja Album	Sunil Baran	Sudhin Dasgupta
1963	Tumi ele chmpa phutechhe tai	Mrinal Chakraborty	Bengali	Puja Album	Sudhin Dasgupta	Prasanta Choudhury
1967	Tumi je asha nodi	Mrinal Chakraborty	Bengali	Puja Album	-	Sudhin Dasgupta
1971	Tumi nirjon upokule	Pintu Bhattacharya	Bengali	Puja Album	Barun Biswas	Sudhin Dasgupta
19-	Utho utho maa Gauri	Geeta Dutt	Bengali	Puja Album	Bhaskar Basu	Sudhin Dasgupta

== Memoirs ==
- Manna Dey recalled his first meeting with Sudhin Dasgupta during 1959, which was published in the book, Sudhin Dasgupta - A Collection of Music Essays. During those days Manne Dey was heavily engaged in Bombay (Mumbai) Film Industry. He came down from Bombay (Mumbai) and met Sudhin for his first record in Sudhin Dasgupta's composition that contained two songs (Ek-i onge eto rup and Meghla meye megher-i) released by the Gramophone Company of India as Puja Album in 1959. Sudhin made another daring experiment for which Bengal will be ever thankful to him. He inducted playback voice of Manna Dey in the lip of the legendary hero Uttam Kumar in the movie "Goli theke raajpoth" in 1959, which was never thought of before. After this successful pairing became a super hit, Manne Dey sang many famous songs in the lip of Uttam Kumar in later years. However, it was again in 1966 Manna Dey got a proposal from Sudhin Dasgupta to sing for Uttam Kumar in the Bengali film Sankyabela. "I am eternally indebted to Sudhinda for the song 'Ke Prothom Kachhe Esechhi' which started my career in Bengali films", said Manna Dey in an interview..
- Dwijem Mukhopadhyay recalled that he was introduced to Sudhin Dasgupta in 1954 by Kshitish Basu of the Gramophone Company of India. Sudhin composed two songs for him. The record has two tracks: 'ভাঙা তরীর শুধু এ গান' and 'এই ছায়া ঘেরা কালো রাতে'. Later, when Salil Chowdhury was composing songs for Madhumati in Bombay, he requested Sudhin to lend him the tune of "Ei chaya Ghera Kalo Raate" for his new song of Madhumati. Sudhin gladly agreed, and a memorable song was created: "Suhana Safar Yieh Mousam Hain Haseen". Such was the friendship between Salil and Sudhin, as remembered by Dwijen Mukhopadhyay in his memoirs.
- Arun Kumar Basu, who used pseudo name Bhaskar Basu while writing and publishing lyrics of Bengali modern songs, placed Sudhin Dasgupta as one of the noted lyricists of Bengali modern songs, in his memoirs on Sudhin. The poems written by Sudhin Dasgupta could be described as the epitome of imagery poems, rich in its form, content, mood and rhythm.
- Jatileswar Mukherjee recalled his frequent visits to the house of Sudhin Dasgupta at D Gupta Lane, SiNthi, on most of the Sundays during the 1960s. Regular visitors of these Majlis were Jatileswar Mukherjee, Sukumar Mitra, Ashok Roy, Debdulal Bandyopadhyay, Ashishtaru Mukherjee, Sunil Baran, Prashanta Choudhury and Parimal Dasgupta (alias Polu, Sudhin's younger brother), among others.
- Salil Mitra, younger brother of Shyamal Mitra, vividly described various incidents showing the deep friendship between contemporary artists of that time, such as Sudhin, Shyamal, Manabendra, Subir Hazra etc., in his reminiscence. One such incident occurred on the day of the marriage of Sudhin Dasgupta with Manjushree. Lyricist Subir Hazra went to the marriage venue at Paikpara in Shyamal Mitra's car. On the way coming back after attending the party, Subir asked Shyamal to stop the car near Wellington square. After a while when Subir did not return, Shyamal got off his car and went in search of Subir, only to find him writing a song sitting on a bench in the park. The subject of the song was the newly-wed bride, Manjushree and her glamorous dress for wedding. Next day both friends went to Sudhin's house, and after the music was composed by Sudhin, a great song was recorded by Shyamal Mitra: লাল চেলি পরনে কার (Laal cheli parone kaar).

== Awards ==
Bengal Film Journalists' Association Awards for best Best Music Director for the film Picnic (1972)

== Legacy ==
Rabindra Bharati University paid homage to this him by creating an archive, where life and works of three legendary personalities of Bengal would be portrayed which includes Soumitra Chatterjee, Salil Chowdhury and him.
