= Haimanti Sukla =

Bengali singer (born 1949)

Haimanti Sukla হৈমন্তী শুক্লা
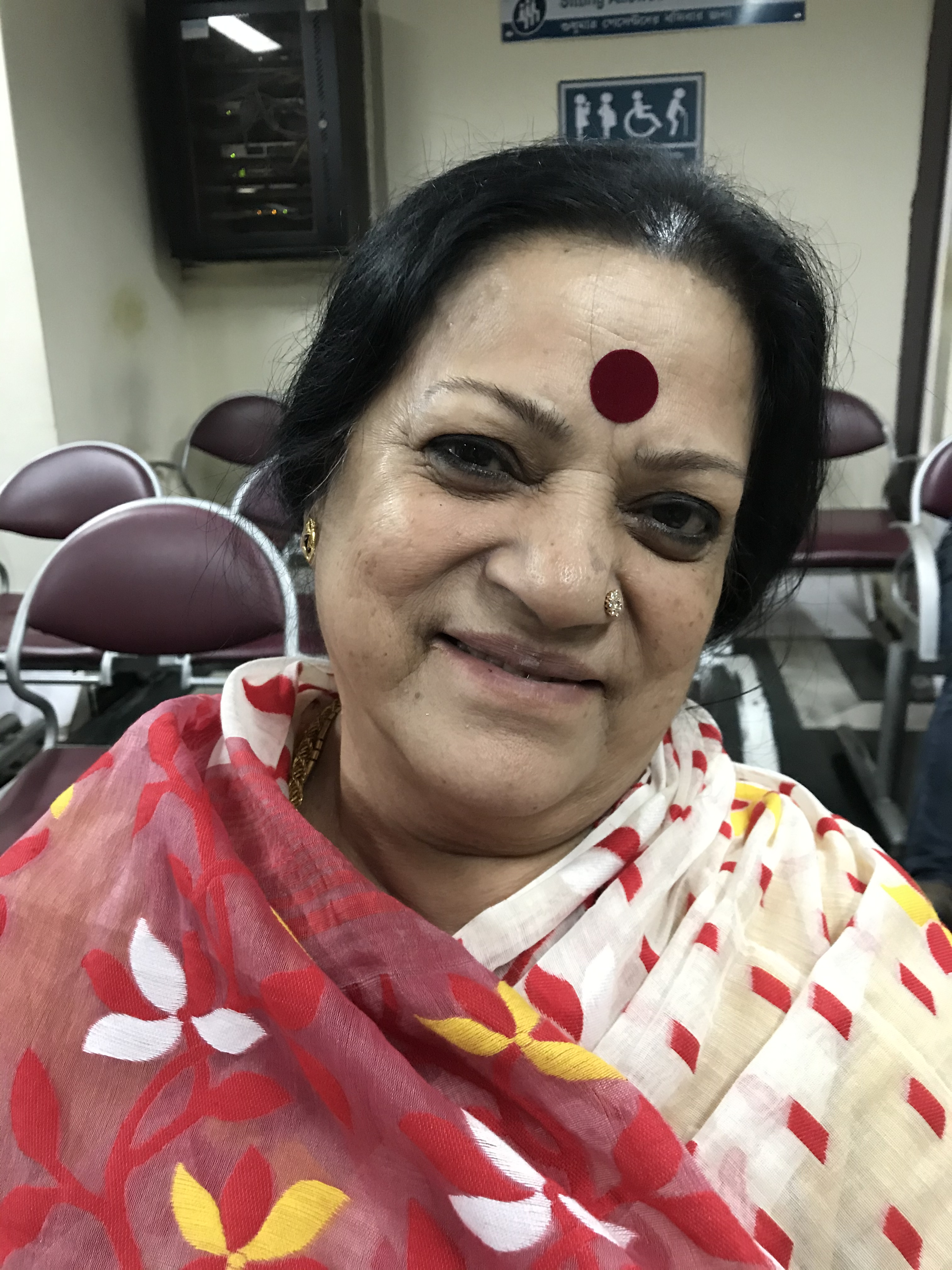
- Sukla in November 2019

Background information
- Born: 2 February 1949 (age 77); Sirajganj, East Bengal, Dominion of Pakistan (present-day Bangladesh)
- Genre: Hindustani classical music
- Occupations: Singer
- Years active: 1972–present

Haimanti Shukla is a Bengali singer. The tradition of Hindustani classical music was in her family and this helped her to become a classically trained singer. She recorded her first song "E to kanna noy aamar" in 1972.

== Early life ==
She was born in Sirajganj, East Pakistan, Dominion of Pakistan (present-day Bangladesh) to Harihar Sukla, a noted Hindustani classical vocalist. She received her training from her father.

== Career ==
Her most popular song in Bollywood is Kahan Se Aaye Badra from the movie Chashme Buddoor. Her first Hindi movie song was "Jeevan ki kitabon par" from movie "Amavas ka Chand". Some of her most notable songs are "Amar Bolar Kichu Chilo Na", (which was composed by Manna De and released in 1978), Bikel Holei Tomaay (composed by Naushad, written by Ravindra Jain), Ekhono Sarengita Bajchhe (composed by Abhijit Banerjee), Jani Na Eye Mala (composed by Ali Akbar Khan), Lachaki Lachaki Awat (composed by Bhimsen Joshi), Mone Pore Tomare (composed by Pandit Ravi Shankar), Ogo Brishti Ami Chokher Pata (composed by Hemanta Mukherjee), Thikana Na Rekhe (composed by Manna Dey) etc.

== Filmography ==
- Amrita (2012)
- Arohon (2010)
- Musolmanir Galpo (2010)
- 1 No. Plum Villa (2009)
- Antarotamo (2008)
- Gandharbi (2002)
- Bhakter Bhagaban (1997)
- Bhalobasa Bhalobasa (1985)
- Jaiphula (1984) (Odia movie)
- Chashme Buddoor (1981)
- Darpachurna (1980)
- Amavas Ka Chand (1979)
- Sister (1977)
- Asadharan (1977)
- Ami Se O Sakha (1977)

== Awards ==
Year	Organization/Award	Film/Song
1973	Pratishruti Parishad	Music Award
1978	Bangla Chalachitra Prashar Samiti Best Singer	Film: Balok Sharatchandra
1982	Sur Singer Academy; Mian Tansen Award	
1982	Bangla Chalachitra Prachar Sanshad	Film: Bodhani
1982	Bangla Chalachitra Purashkar Samiti	Ram Kahat Hai (Hindi)
1999	Bangla Language & Literary Society, Singapore	
1999	NABC Worldwide Millennium Celebration	
2005	Kalakar Award	Best music album Bankura University, West Bengal, India awarded her Honorary D. Litt. on 29 October 2018 for her significant contribution to the field of music
