= Picnic (1972 film) =

- Directed by: Inder Sen
- Screenplay by: Inder Sen
- Based on: Picnic by Ramapada Chowdhury
- Starring: Archana; Dhritiman Chatterjee; Joyoshree Ray; Ranjit Mallick; Arati Bhattacharya; Samit Bhanja
- Cinematography: Sailaja Chatterjee
- Edited by: Arabinda Bhattacharya
- Music by: Sudhin Dasgupta
- Production company: Ikans Films
- Release date: 28 August 1972 (India)
- Running time: 124 minutes
- Country: India
- Language: Bengali

Picnic is a 1972 Indian Bengali film, written and directed by Inder Sen, based on the 1970 Ramapada Chowdhury novel of the same name. It stars Archana, Dhritiman Chatterjee, Joyoshree Ray, Ranjit Mallick, Arati Bhattacharya and Samit Bhanja in the lead roles.

== Cast ==
- Archana
- Dhritiman Chatterjee
- Joyoshree Ray
- Ranjit Mallick
- Arati Bhattacharya
- Samit Bhanja
- Chinmoy Roy

== Filmscore ==
All the lyrics were co-written by Sudhin Dasgupta and Pulak Bandyopadhyay, where playback singing by Manna Dey and Asha Bhosle.

Song	Singer
"Ekdin Dal Bendhe Kojone Mile"	Manna Dey
"Kashmire Noy, Shillongeo Noy"	Manna Dey
"Keno Sarbonasher Nesha Dhariye"	Asha Bhosle
"Mon Metechhe Monmoyurir Ki Khelay"	Asha Bhosle
