= Gauriprasanna Mazumder =

Indian lyricist and writer (1925–1986)

Gauriprasanna Majumdar
- Born: 5 December 1925; Pabna, Bangladesh
- Died: 20 August 1986 (aged 61); Kolkata, India
- Education: Presidency College, Kolkata
- Occupation: Lyricist
- Awards: National Film Awards (1969); Bengal Film Journalists' Association Awards (1962),(1964),(1968),(1974),(1976),(1987)

Smaroner ei balukabelay-Bengali movie song from "Priyatama" (In this sandy day of remembrance)
Lyricist Gouriprasanna Majumdar, composer and singer Hemanta Mukhopadhyay

Gauriprasanna Majumdar (5 December 1925 – 20 August 1986) was an Indian lyricist and writer known for his work in Indian cinema. He is most commonly associated with the black and white era of Bengali cinema, when he penned several enduring classics for films. Often considered as one of the greatest and most prominent lyricists of the golden era of Bengali cinema, he is a recipient of numerous accolades. He won the Bengal Film Journalists' Association Awards for best lyricist for Swaralipi (1962), Palatak (1964), Antony Firingee (1967), Bon Palashir Padabali (1974), Sanyasi Raja (1976) and Anurager Chhoan (1987, posthumously). He also won National Film Awards of Bangladesh for Sesh Porjonto (1969).

== Career ==
Majumdar was a contemporary of Nachiketa Ghosh, Robin Chattopadhyay, Hemanta Mukherjee, Uttam Kumar and Kishore Kumar. He had also worked extensively with R. D. Burman, Kishore Kumar, Sandhya Mukherjee and Manna De. He was closely associated with music composer Neeta Sen. His lyrics was known for expressing emotions, sculpt feelings and his command over words.

His works include Maago Vabna Keno, Akash Keno Daake, Aj Ei Dintake Moner Khatay, Amar Swapno Tumi, Asha Chilo Bhalobasha Chilo, Aaj Dujonar Duti Poth, Coffee Houser Shei Addata, Ei To Hethay Kunjo Chhayay, Ek Polokey Ektu Dekha, Ei Balukabelay, Ei Raat Tomar Amar, Ei Poth Jodi Na Shesh Hoy, Ki Ashay Bandhi Khelaghor, Neer Choto Khoti Nei, Ami Je Jalsaghare, Mou Bone Aaj Mou Jomechey, O Nodi Re, Shing Nei Tobu Naam Tar Singha and Mangal Deep Jwele.

== Discography ==
Year	Film	Song	Composer	Ref	Notes
1952	Amar Bhoopali	"All songs"	Vasant Desai		Bengali dubbed version of the 1951 Marathi film of the same name
1954	Shubho Jatra	"All songs"	Satyajit Majumdar		
1954	Ankush	"All songs"	Kalipada Sen		
1954	Agni Pariksha	"All songs"	Anupam Ghatak		
1954	Jadu Bhatta		Jnan Prakash Ghosh		
1954	Boloy Graash	"All songs"	Rajen Sarkar		
1955	Nishiddho Phal	"All songs"	Nachiketa Ghosh		
1955	Anupama	"All songs"	Anupam Ghatak		
1955	Dattak	"All songs"	Manabendra Mukherjee		
1955	Shajghor		Satyajit Majumdar		
1955	Debotro		Kalipada Sen		
1955	Chhoto Bou	"All songs"	Kalipada Sen		
1955	Pather Seshey	"All songs"			
1955	Jyotishi	"All songs"	Gopen Mullik		
1955	Jhorer Pore	"All songs"	Nachiketa Ghosh		
1955	Bidhilipi		Kalipada Sen		
1955	Joy Maa Kali Boarding	"All songs"	Shyamal Mitra		
1955	Upahar	"All songs"	Kalipada Sen		
1955	Godhuli	"All songs"	Robin Chatterjee		
1955	Devi Malini		Anupam Ghatak, Robin Chatterjee		
1955	Bhalobasha		Nachiketa Ghosh		
1955	Paresh		Anupam Ghatak		
1955	Raat Bhore	"All songs"	Salil Chowdhury		
1955	Sabar Uparey	"All songs"	Robin Chatterjee		
1955	Dujonay	"All songs"	Anil Biswas		
1955	Kalindi	"All songs"	Rabi Roy Chowdhury		
1955	Ardhangini	"All songs"	Nachiketa Ghosh		
1956	Bhola Master		Kalipada Sen		
1956	Sagarika		Robin Chatterjee		
1956	Kirtigarh		Anupam Ghatak		
1956	Ekti Raat	"All songs"	Anupam Ghatak		
1956	Ashamapto		Anupam Ghatak, Anil Bagchi, Durga Sen, Nachiketa Ghosh and Bhupen Hazarika		
1956	Shankar Narayan Bank	"All songs"	Anupam Ghatak		
1956	Shyamali		Kalipada Sen		
1956	Trijama	"All songs"	Nachiketa Ghosh		
1956	Chhaya Sangini	"All songs"	Kalipada Sen, Biren Ray		Also screenplay and storywriter
1956	Suryamukhi	"All songs"	Hemanta Mukherjee		
1956	Putra Badhu	"All songs"	Rajen Sarkar		
1956	Dhular Dharani		Manabendra Mukherjee		
1956	Sinthir Sindoor	"All songs"	Kalipada Sen		
1956	Aamar Bou		Binoy Chatterjee		
1956	Nabajanma	"All songs"	Nachiketa Ghosh		
1957	Ulka		Sudhin Dasgupta		
1957	Taposhi	"All songs"	Nachiketa Ghosh		
1957	Jatra Holo Shuru		Robin Chatterjee		
1957	Adarsha Hindu Hotel	"All songs"	Manabendra Mukherjee		
1957	Prithibi Amare Chay		Nachiketa Ghosh		
1957	Harishchandra	"All songs"	Nachiketa Ghosh		
1957	Notun Prabhat	"All songs"	Nachiketa Ghosh		
1957	Kancha Meetthe	"All songs"	Rajen Sarkar		
1957	Porer Chheley		Anupam Ghatak		
1957	Basanta Bahar		Jnan Prakash Ghosh		
1957	Harano Sur	"All songs"	Hemanta Mukherjee		
1957	Madhabir Jonyo	"All songs"	Anupam Ghatak		
1957	Chandranath		Robin Chatterjee		
1957	Daata Karna	"All songs"	Rajen Sarkar		
1957	Pathey Holo Deri	"All songs"	Robin Chatterjee		
1957	Jiban Trishna		Robin Chatterjee		
1958	Jamalaye Jibanta Manush		Shyamal Mitra		
1958	Sonar Kathi		Rajen Sarkar		
1958	Bondhu	"All songs"	Nachiketa Ghosh		
1958	Daily Passenger	"All songs"	Shyamal Mitra		
1958	Bhanu Pelo Lottery	"All songs"	Nachiketa Ghosh		
1958	Swarga Martya	"All songs"	Kalipada Sen		
1958	Jonakir Alo		Bhupen Hazarika		
1958	Shikar	"All songs"	Hemanta Mukherjee		
1958	Indrani	"All songs"	Nachiketa Ghosh		Also wrote a Hindi song
1958	Purir Mandir	"All songs"	Kalipada Sen		
1958	Surya Toran	"All songs"	Hemanta Mukherjee		Also storywriter
1959	Janmantar		Saroj Kushari		
1959	Marutirtha Hinglaj	"All songs"	Hemanta Mukherjee		
1959	Neel Akasher Neechey	"All songs"	Hemanta Mukherjee		
1959	Chaowa Paowa		Nachiketa Ghosh		
1959	Deep Jweley Jaai	"All songs"	Hemanta Mukherjee		
1959	Goli Theke Rajpath	"All songs"	Sudhin Dasgupta		
1959	Khelaghar		Hemanta Mukherjee		
1959	Sonar Harin	"All songs"	Hemanta Mukherjee		
1959	Abak Prithibi		Amal Mukherjee		
1959	Personal Assistant	"All songs"	Nachiketa Ghosh		
1960	Maya Mriga	"All songs"	Manabendra Mukherjee		
1960	Raja Saja	"All songs"	Kalipada Sen		
1960	Kuhak	"All songs"	Hemanta Mukherjee		
1960	Baishey Srabon	"All songs"	Hemanta Mukherjee		
1960	Uttar Megh	"All songs"	Robin Chatterjee		
1960	Indradhanu	"All songs"	Robin Chatterjee		
1960	Kshudha		Nachiketa Ghosh		
1960	Chupi Chupi Aashey	"All songs"	Nachiketa Ghosh		
1960	Kono Ekdin	"All songs"	Saroj Kushari		
1960	Shaharer Itikatha	"All songs"	Robin Chatterjee		
1960	Smritituku Thak	"Kichhu Khushi Kichhu"	Robin Chatterjee		Along with Shibdas Banerjee
1960	Hospital	"All songs"	Amal Mukherjee		
1960	Sesh Porjonto	"All songs"	Hemanta Mukherjee		
1960	Biyer Khata	"All songs"	Nachiketa Ghosh		
1960	Shuno Baranari	"Piriti Ki Reet"	Robin Chatterjee		Along with Rabindranath Tagore; Also wrote a Hindi song
1960	Shuno Baranari	"Tare Anunoy Kore Bolechhi"	Robin Chatterjee		Along with Rabindranath Tagore; Also wrote a Hindi song
1960	Aparadh	"All songs"	Bibhuti Bhushan		
1961	Carey Saheber Munshi	"All songs"	Robin Chatterjee		
1961	Sathihara	"All songs"	Hemanta Mukherjee		
1961	Mr. & Mrs. Chowdhury	"All songs"	Rathin Ghosh		
1961	Agni Sanskar	"All songs"	Hemanta Mukherjee		
1961	Swaralipi	"All songs"	Hemanta Mukherjee		
1961	Madhyaraater Tara	"All songs"	Hemanta Mukherjee		
1961	Panka Tilak	"Kajol Kalo Ei Chokhe"	Sudhin Dasgupta		Along with Subir Hazra & Pabitra Mitra
1961	Panka Tilak	"E Amay Kothay Niye Ele"	Sudhin Dasgupta		Along with Subir Hazra & Pabitra Mitra
1961	Panka Tilak	"Ki Jaadu Jaane"	Sudhin Dasgupta		Along with Subir Hazra & Pabitra Mitra
1961	Kothin Maya	"All songs"	Nachiketa Ghosh		
1961	Ashay Bandhinu Ghar	"All songs"	V. Balsara		
1961	Dui Bhai	"All songs"	Hemanta Mukherjee		
1961	Saptapadi	"All songs"	Hemanta Mukherjee		
1962	Sorry Madam	"All songs"	Ved Pal		
1962	Bipasha	"All songs"	Robin Chatterjee		
1962	Sancharini	"All songs"	Kalipada Sen		
1962	Atal Jaler Ahwan	"All songs"	Hemanta Mukherjee		
1962	Aagun	"Chhamak Chhamak Bole"	Hemanta Mukherjee		Along with Tarashankar Bandyopadhyay
1962	Bandhan	"All songs"	Rajen Sarkar		
1962	Kajal	"All songs"	Robin Chatterjee		
1962	Dada Thakur	"O Shon Re Amar Mon Majhi"	Hemanta Mukherjee		Along with Kazi Nazrul Islam & Sarat Chandra Pandit
1962	Naba Diganta	"All songs"	Hemanta Mukherjee		
1962	Dhup Chhaya	"All songs"	Amal Mukherjee		
1963	Ek Tukro Agun	"All songs"	Hemanta Mukherjee		
1963	Dui Bari	"All songs"	Kalipada Sen		
1963	Barna Chora	"All songs"	Hemanta Mukherjee		
1963	High Heel	"All songs"	Hemanta Mukherjee		
1963	Bhranti Bilas	"All songs"	Shyamal Mitra		
1963	Palatak	"Aha Re Bidhi Go"	Hemanta Mukherjee		Along with Mukul Dutt
1963	Sesh Prahar	"All songs"	Hemanta Mukherjee		
1963	Tridhara	"All songs"	Hemanta Mukherjee		
1963	Hashi Shudhu Hashi Noy	"Bandhu Amar Mon Dukkho"	Shyamal Mitra		Along with Pulak Bandyopadhyay & Pranab Roy
1963	Deya Neya	"All songs"	Shyamal Mitra		
1963	Badsha	"All songs"	Hemanta Mukherjee		
1964	Saptarshi	"All songs"	Shyamal Mitra		
1964	Bibhas	"Eto Din Pore Tumi"	Hemanta Mukherjee		Along with Rabindranath Tagore
1964	Bibhas	"Taray Taray Jwaluk Baati"	Hemanta Mukherjee		Along with Rabindranath Tagore
1964	Swarga Hote Biday	"All songs"	Hemanta Mukherjee		
1964	Prabhater Rang	"All songs"	Hemanta Mukherjee		
1964	Kantataar	"All songs"	Nachiketa Ghosh		
1964	Natun Tirtha	"Dukkho Jodi Naa Ashe"	Hemanta Mukherjee		
1964	Natun Tirtha	"Ami Pathe Pathe Ghure Berai"	Hemanta Mukherjee		
1964	Arohi	"All songs"	Hemanta Mukherjee		
1964	Mahatirtha Kalighat	"Kali Kapalini"	Rathin Ghosh		Along with Harekrishna Mukherjee
1964	Mahatirtha Kalighat	"Dashamahavidya"	Rathin Ghosh		Along with Harekrishna Mukherjee
1964	Mahatirtha Kalighat	"Nai Maa Amar Parer Kori"	Rathin Ghosh		Along with Harekrishna Mukherjee
1964	Mahatirtha Kalighat	"Maa Go Sandhya Holo"	Rathin Ghosh		Along with Harekrishna Mukherjee
1965	Trishna	"All songs"	Shyamal Mitra		
1965	Alor Pipasa	"Minati Mor Tomar Paaye"	Hemanta Mukherjee		Along with Kaifi Azmi & Rabindranath Tagore
1965	Mahalagna	"Enechhi Chiriyakhana"	Kalipada Sen		Along with Pulak Bandyopadhyay
1965	Mahalagna	"Kalari Banshite"	Kalipada Sen		Along with Pulak Bandyopadhyay
1965	Antaral	"All songs"	Sudhin Dasgupta		
1965	Bharater Sadhak	"All songs"	Anil Bagchi		
1965	Rajkanya	"All songs"	Shyamal Mitra		
1966	Pandaber Banabash	"All songs"	Ghantasala		
1966	Sushanta Sha	"All songs"	Sudhin Dasgupta		
1966	Rajodrohi	"All songs"	Ali Akbar Khan		
1966	Shudhu Ekti Bachhar	"All songs"	Robin Chatterjee		
1966	Harano Prem	"All songs"	Robin Chatterjee		
1966	Lab Kush	"Dyuloke Bhuloke Antarikkhe"	Srikanta		
1967	Nayika Sangbad	"Ei Purnima Raat"	Hemanta Mukherjee		Along with Mohini Choudhury
1967	Nayika Sangbad	"Aaj Chanchal Mon Jodi"	Hemanta Mukherjee		Along with Mohini Choudhury
1967	Pancha Pandaber Agyatabash	"All songs"	T. V. Raju		
1967	Balika Badhu	"Ami Kusum Tulia"	Hemanta Mukherjee		Along with Rabindranath Tagore, Dwijendralal Ray & Mukunda Das
1967	Balika Badhu	"Lag Lag Ranger Bhelki"	Hemanta Mukherjee		Along with Rabindranath Tagore, Dwijendralal Ray & Mukunda Das
1967	Balika Badhu	"Shuk Bole Keno Shari"	Hemanta Mukherjee		Along with Rabindranath Tagore, Dwijendralal Ray & Mukunda Das
1967	Kheya	"All songs"	Shyamal Mitra		
1967	Dushtu Projapoti	"Eureka Eureka Eureka"	Hemanta Mukherjee		Along with Mukul Dutt & Shyam Chakraborty
1967	Dushtu Projapoti	"Chhalaki Chhalaki Mon"	Hemanta Mukherjee		Along with Mukul Dutt & Shyam Chakraborty
1967	Dushtu Projapoti	"Guten Morgen Bonjo"	Hemanta Mukherjee		Along with Mukul Dutt & Shyam Chakraborty
1967	Antony Firingee	"Ami Jamini Tumi Shashi Hey"	Anil Bagchi		Along with Pranab Roy
1967	Antony Firingee	"Ami Je Jalsaghare – Female"	Anil Bagchi		Along with Pranab Roy
1967	Antony Firingee	"Ami Je Jalshaghare – Male"	Anil Bagchi		Along with Pranab Roy
1967	Antony Firingee	"Maa Tui Amay Daya Korbi Kina Bol"	Anil Bagchi		Along with Pranab Roy
1967	Antony Firingee	"Tumhu Mamo Monopran Hey"	Anil Bagchi		Along with Pranab Roy
1967	Antony Firingee	"Shuno Hey Antony Saheb"	Anil Bagchi		Along with Pranab Roy
1967	Antony Firingee	"Satya Bate Ami Jetate"	Anil Bagchi		Along with Pranab Roy
1968	Chhotto Jigyasa	"All songs"	Nachiketa Ghosh		Also writer
1968	Pathey Holo Dekha	"Cholo Cholo Mora Chole Jaai"	V. Balsara		Along with Mantu Sarkar
1968	Pathey Holo Dekha	"Bolte Paro Emon Keno Hoy"	V. Balsara		Along with Mantu Sarkar
1968	Pathey Holo Dekha	"Je Kotha Kolir Kane Bole Oli"	V. Balsara		Along with Mantu Sarkar
1968	Parishodh	"All songs"	Hemanta Mukherjee		
1968	Rakta Rekha	"All songs"	Nachiketa Ghosh		
1969	Chiradiner	"All songs"	Nachiketa Ghosh		
1969	Shuk Sari	"All songs"	Hemanta Mukherjee		
1969	Bibaha Bibhrat	"All songs"	Shyamal Mitra		
1969	Duranta Charai	"Je Chokhete Dekhbe Amay"	Shyamal Mitra		Along with Rabindranath Tagore & Bimal Bowmik
1969	Duranta Charai	"Jharna Jharna"	Shyamal Mitra		Along with Rabindranath Tagore & Bimal Bowmik
1969	Duranta Charai	"Eto Kore Bojhe Na"	Shyamal Mitra		Along with Rabindranath Tagore & Bimal Bowmik
1969	Chena Achena	"All songs"	Hemanta Mukherjee		
1970	Samantaral	"All songs"	Shyamal Mitra		
1970	Padma Golap	"All songs"	Shyamal Mitra		
1970	Rajkumari	"All songs"	R. D. Burman		
1970	Nishi Padma	"Ja Khushi Ora Bole"	Nachiketa Ghosh		Along with Arabinda Mukherjee & Chandidas Basu
1970	Nishi Padma	"Na Na Aj Rate Ar Jatra Sunte"	Nachiketa Ghosh		Along with Arabinda Mukherjee & Chandidas Basu
1970	Swarna Shikhar Pranganey	"Ei Lajuk Chokhe"	Shailesh Roy		Along with Shibdas Banerjee
1970	Rupashi	"Ore O Dhani Lanka"	Anil Bagchi		Along with Sunil Baran
1970	Rupashi	"Amay Sabai Sera Bole"	Anil Bagchi		Along with Sunil Baran
1970	Rupashi	"Kheli Je Lukochuri"	Anil Bagchi		Along with Sunil Baran
1970	Rupashi	"O Sujji Alo De"	Anil Bagchi		Along with Sunil Baran
1970	Rupashi	"Kokila Re O tui Emon Kore"	Anil Bagchi		Along with Sunil Baran
1971	Bhagya	"All songs"	Laxmikant–Pyarelal		
1971	Pratibad	"All songs"	Shyamal Mitra		
1971	Chaitali	"Duti Kotha Jeno"	S. D. Burman		Along with Anand Bakshi
1971	Chaitali	"Shudhai Ami Ei Path"	S. D. Burman		Along with Anand Bakshi
1971	Chaitali	"Dangshili Tui"	S. D. Burman		Along with Anand Bakshi
1971	Kuheli	"Ke Jege Achho"	Hemanta Mukherjee		Along with Rabindranath Tagore
1971	Kuheli	"Keno Ele"	Hemanta Mukherjee		Along with Rabindranath Tagore
1971	Kuheli	"Esho Kachhe Esho"	Hemanta Mukherjee		Along with Rabindranath Tagore
1971	Kuheli	"Aparna"	Hemanta Mukherjee		Along with Rabindranath Tagore
1971	Anya Mati Anya Rang	"Chal Na Jaai"	Hridoy Kushari		Along with Pulak Bandyopadhyay, Jagadish Ojha & Rakhal Chandra Naha
1971	Khunje Berai	"Ektu Aaro Sorei Na Hoy"	Robin Chatterjee		Along with Rabindranath Tagore
1971	Khunje Berai	"Na Na Jeo Na Chole Jeo Na"	Robin Chatterjee		Along with Rabindranath Tagore
1971	Jiban Jigyasa	"Tomari Banka O Chokh"	Shyamal Mitra		
1971	Fariyad	"I am the Sin"	Nachiketa Ghosh		Along with Pulak Bandyopadhyay & Pranab Roy
1971	Sansar	"All songs"	Hemanta Mukherjee		
1972	Maa O Mati	"All songs"	Anil Bagchi		
1972	Andha Atit	"All songs"	Shyamal Mitra		
1972	Chhayateer	"All songs"	Abhijit Banerjee		
1972	Stree	"Shokhi Kalo Amar Bhalo Lage Na"	Nachiketa Ghosh		
1972	Stree	"Jemon Shapini Ke Posh Manay Ojha"	Nachiketa Ghosh		
1972	Stree	"Haazar Takar Jharbati Ta"	Nachiketa Ghosh		
1973	Natun Diner Alo	"All songs"	Nachiketa Ghosh		
1973	Nakal Sona	"All songs"	Nachiketa Ghosh		
1973	Bon Palashir Padabali	"Aaha Mori Mori"	Shyamal Mitra		Along with Rabindranath Tagore (Note: Worked with multiple composers in the film.)
1973	Bon Palashir Padabali	"Dekhuk Para Parshite"	Shyamal Mitra		Along with Rabindranath Tagore
1973	Bon Palashir Padabali	"Bhola Mon – Mon Aamar"	Shyamal Mitra		Along with Rabindranath Tagore
1973	Bon Palashir Padabali	"Amar Monta Tane"	Adhir Bagchi		Along with Rabindranath Tagore
1973	Bon Palashir Padabali	"Dhin Kete Dhin Dhinta"	Adhir Bagchi		Along with Rabindranath Tagore
1973	Bon Palashir Padabali	"Bohudin Pore Bhromor"	Satinath Mukherjee		Along with Rabindranath Tagore
1973	Bon Palashir Padabali	"Ei To Bhaber Khela"	Satinath Mukherjee		Along with Rabindranath Tagore
1973	Bon Palashir Padabali	"O Bhaber Nagori"	Nachiketa Ghosh		Along with Rabindranath Tagore
1973	Shabari	"Keu Sunechho Ki"	Nachiketa Ghosh		Along with Pulak Bandypadhyay
1973	Shabari	"Bandhu Moner Aayna Diye"	Nachiketa Ghosh		Along with Pulak Bandypadhyay
1973	Kayahiner Kahini	"All songs"	Mukul Roy		
1973	Chithi	"All songs"	Shyamal Mitra		
1973	Aaranyak	"All songs"	Kalipada Sen		
1973	Abirey Rangano	"Chittasuddhi Ganga Jole"	Satyadeb Chatterjee		Along with Mrinal Banerjee, Amal Dutta, Satyadeb Chatterjee & Shibnarayan Ghosal
1973	Bindur Chhele	"All songs"	Kalipada Sen		
1973	Shriman Prithviraj	"Haridaser Bulbul Bhaja"	Hemanta Mukherjee		Along with Rabindranath Tagore
1973	Shriman Prithviraj	"Tolpi Tolpa Niye Ebar"	Hemanta Mukherjee		Along with Rabindranath Tagore
1973	Shriman Prithviraj	"Aaji Basante"	Hemanta Mukherjee		Along with Rabindranath Tagore
1973	Shriman Prithviraj	"Noro Dhame Sakhato Ishwar He"	Hemanta Mukherjee		Along with Rabindranath Tagore
1973	Agni Bhramar	"All songs"	Nachiketa Ghosh		
1973	Nani Gopaler Biye	"All songs"	Nachiketa Ghosh		
1974	Sraban Sandhya	"All songs"	Nachiketa Ghosh		
1974	Asati	"All songs"	Nachiketa Ghosh		
1974	Amanush	"All songs"	Shyamal Mitra		
1974	Sujata	"All songs"	Nachiketa Ghosh		
1974	Thagini	"Oi Sandhya Tara Jwale"	Hemanta Mukherjee		Along with Rabindranath Tagore & Tarun Majumdar
1975	Mouchak	"Ta Bole Ki Prem Debo Na"	Nachiketa Ghosh		Along with Shyamal Gupta
1975	Mouchak	"Besh Korechi Prem Korechi"	Nachiketa Ghosh		Along with Shyamal Gupta
1975	Mouchak	"Pagla Garod Kothay Achhe"	Nachiketa Ghosh		Along with Shyamal Gupta
1975	Phulu Thakurmaa	"All songs"	Shyamal Mitra		
1975	Ami, Shey O Shakha	"All songs"	Shyamal Mitra		
1975	Umno O Jhumno	"Maa Go Maa Bhaber Khela"	Santosh Mukherjee		Along with Pulak Bandyopadhyay
1975	Nagar Darpane	"All songs"	Nachiketa Ghosh		
1975	Priyo Bandhabi	"All songs"	Nachiketa Ghosh		
1975	Sanyasi Raja	"Bhalobasar Agun Jwalao"	Nachiketa Ghosh		Along with Sankarachya & Kabir
1975	Sanyasi Raja	"Ghar Sansar Sobai To Chai"	Nachiketa Ghosh		Along with Sankarachya & Kabir
1975	Sanyasi Raja	"Se Kotha Ki Jane Indu"	Nachiketa Ghosh		Along with Sankarachya & Kabir
1975	Sanyasi Raja	"Puja Ki Go Theme Jay"	Nachiketa Ghosh		Along with Sankarachya & Kabir
1975	Sanyasi Raja	"Kato Rasik Dekho Bhagaban"	Nachiketa Ghosh		Along with Sankarachya & Kabir
1975	Sanyasi Raja	"Karan Sebay Baran Karo"	Nachiketa Ghosh		Along with Sankarachya & Kabir
1975	Sanyasi Raja	"Hujur Bole Selam Kore"	Nachiketa Ghosh		Along with Sankarachya & Kabir
1975	Sanyasi Raja	"Ogo Beshi Daam Balo Kar"	Nachiketa Ghosh		Along with Sankarachya & Kabir
1975	Sanyasi Raja	"Kaharba Noy Dadra Bajao"	Nachiketa Ghosh		Along with Sankarachya & Kabir
1975	Kajallata	"All songs"	Nachiketa Ghosh		
1976	Shankhabish		Hemanta Mukherjee		Along with Pulak Bandyopadhyay
1976	Hotel Snow Fox	"Bandor Theke Manush Hoyechhilo"	Nachiketa Ghosh		Along with Shyamal Gupta & Indrani Bhattacharya
1976	Hotel Snow Fox	"Amra Ghurchhi Na"	Nachiketa Ghosh		Along with Shyamal Gupta & Indrani Bhattacharya
1976	Hotel Snow Fox	"Bhalobasha Joy Na Se Haar"	Nachiketa Ghosh		Along with Shyamal Gupta & Indrani Bhattacharya
1976	Hotel Snow Fox	"Jor Khobor"	Nachiketa Ghosh		Along with Shyamal Gupta & Indrani Bhattacharya
1976	Anandamela	"All songs"	Nachiketa Ghosh		
1976	Mombati	"All songs"	Nachiketa Ghosh		
1976	Sei Chokh	"All songs"	Nachiketa Ghosh		
1976	Nidhiram Sardar	"All songs"	Ananda Shankar		
1976	Banhishikha	"All songs"	Hemanta Mukherjee		
1976	Chander Kachhakachhi	"All songs"	Robin Chatterjee		
1977	Rajbansha	"All songs"	Shyamal Mitra		
1977	Nayan	"All songs"	Ajoy Das		
1977	Asadharan	"All songs"	Nachiketa Ghosh		
1977	Babumashai	"All songs"	Manna Dey		
1977	Ajasra Dhanyabad	"All songs"	Shyamal Mitra		
1977	Baba Taraknath	"All songs"	Nita Sen		
1977	Jaal Sanyasi	"All songs"	Shyamal Mitra		
1977	Ananda Ashram	"All songs"	Shyamal Mitra		
1977	Mantramugdha	"Ektu Cholai Khabo"	Hemanta Mukherjee		Along with Balai Chand Mukherjee
1977	Mantramugdha	"Aaj Ei Hostel E"	Hemanta Mukherjee		Along with Balai Chand Mukherjee
1977	Mantramugdha	"Onek Malati Geeta Seeta"	Hemanta Mukherjee		Along with Balai Chand Mukherjee
1977	Mantramugdha	"Esechhi Eito Saaqi"	Hemanta Mukherjee		Along with Balai Chand Mukherjee
1977	Mantramugdha	"O Rupashi"	Hemanta Mukherjee		Along with Balai Chand Mukherjee
1977	Mantramugdha	"Pichhiye Gele Cholbena Jaadu"	Hemanta Mukherjee		Along with Balai Chand Mukherjee
1977	Chhotto Nayak	"All songs"	Nita Sen		
1977	Pratima	"Ami Bou Tumi Bor"	Hemanta Mukherjee		Along with Dinabandhu Mitra and Tarashankar Bandyopadhyay
1977	Pratima	"Kabar Dao Ba Chitai Porao"	Hemanta Mukherjee		Along with Dinabandhu Mitra and Tarashankar Bandyopadhyay
1977	Pratima	"Maan Korona Bidhumukhi"	Hemanta Mukherjee		Along with Dinabandhu Mitra and Tarashankar Bandyopadhyay
1977	Proxy	"All songs"	Hemanta Mukherjee		
1978	Moyna	"Tentul Gachhe Phalechhe"	Anupam Mukherjee		Along with Satyen Ganguly
1978	Moyna	"Jodi Nai Ba Thaki"	Anupam Mukherjee		Along with Satyen Ganguly
1978	Moyna	"Ashim Tomar Karuna"	Sachin Ganguly		Along with Satyen Ganguly
1978	Bandie	"Ke Bole Bijli Sudhu"	Shyamal Mitra		Along with Salil Chowdhury
1978	Bandie	"Mone Hoy Swarge Achhi"	Shyamal Mitra		Along with Salil Chowdhury
1978	Bandie	"Ei Jibaner Dam Je Onek"	Shyamal Mitra		Along with Salil Chowdhury
1978	Bandie	"Ogo Sathi Go"	Shyamal Mitra		Along with Salil Chowdhury
1978	Pronoy Pasha	"All songs"	Hemanta Mukherjee		
1978	Golap Bou	"All songs"	Nita Sen		
1978	Aradhana	"All songs"	S. D. Burman		
1978	Nishan	"All songs"	Shyamal Mitra		
1978	Dhanraj Tamang	"All songs"	Shyamal Mitra		
1979	Brojobuli	"All songs"	Nachiketa Ghosh		
1979	Krishna Sudama	"All songs"	Nita Sen		
1979	Nandan	"All songs"	Nita Sen		
1979	Samadhan	"All songs"	Adhir Bagchi		
1980	Sesh Bichar	"All songs"	Hemanta Mukherjee		
1980	G. T. Road	"All songs"	Anal Chatterjee		
1980	Priyatama	"All songs"	Shyamal Mitra		
1980	Dui Prithibi	"All songs"	Ananda Shankar		
1980	Paka Dekha	"Jodi Chao Jante Amra"	Hemanta Mukherjee		Along with Balai Chand Mukherjee
1980	Paka Dekha	"Gour Baran Sanyasi Ek"	Hemanta Mukherjee		Along with Balai Chand Mukherjee
1980	Paka Dekha	"Bhanur Pashe Chandra Jemon"	Hemanta Mukherjee		Along with Balai Chand Mukherjee
1980	Seeta	"All songs"	Nita Sen		
1981	Anusandhan	"All songs"	R. D. Burman		
1981	Abichar	"All songs"	Usha Khanna		
1981	Khana Baraha	"All songs"	Shyamal Mitra		
1981	Maa Bipattarani Chandi	"Dekha Toke Ditei Hobe"	Sanjoy Dasgupta		Along with Pulin Bihari Adhya & Mohini Choudhury
1981	Surya Sakkhi	"All songs"	Prabir Majumdar		
1981	Kalankini	"Kichhu Kotha Chhilo Chokhe"	Shyamal Mitra		Along with Pranab Roy
1981	Kalankini	"Eki Sathe Haat Dhore"	Shyamal Mitra		Along with Pranab Roy
1981	Kalankini	"Ami Ke Se Ki Bhule Gele"	Shyamal Mitra		Along with Pranab Roy
1981	Kalankini	"Sohani Raat Phire Pabo Naki	Shyamal Mitra		Along with Pranab Roy
1981	Kalankini	"Nesha Tumi Jotoi Koro"	Shyamal Mitra		Along with Pranab Roy
1981	Kalankini	"Payel Bendhechhi Paaye"	Shyamal Mitra		Along with Pranab Roy
1981	Saheb	"Ekta Cup Ekta Shield"	Abhijit Banerjee		Along with Rabindranath Tagore
1981	Saheb	"Koto Swapno"	Abhijit Banerjee		Along with Rabindranath Tagore
1981	Saheb	"O Mukhapadme"	Abhijit Banerjee		Along with Rabindranath Tagore
1981	Pahari Phool	"All songs"	Nita Sen		
1982	Sati Sabitri Satyaban	"All songs"	Nita Sen		
1982	Swarna Mahal	"Mitwa Re"	Ajoy Das		Along with Samir Ghosh
1982	Swarna Mahal	"Gila Gila"	Ajoy Das		Along with Samir Ghosh
1982	Swarna Mahal	"Maa Amay Saheb Sajiyechhe"	Ajoy Das		Along with Samir Ghosh
1982	Pratiksha	"All songs"	Hemanta Mukherjee		
1982	Rashamoyeer Rashikata	"All songs"	Nita Sen		
1982	Preyoshi	"All songs"	Manna Dey		
1982	Mamata	"All songs"	Ajoy Das		
1982	Maatir Swarga	"Bou Cholechhe"	Shyamal Mitra		Along with Jayadeva and Kazi Nazrul Islam
1982	Maatir Swarga	"Nari Se To"	Shyamal Mitra		Along with Jayadeva and Kazi Nazrul Islam
1982	Maatir Swarga	"Prabhat Lagan Elo"	Shyamal Mitra		Along with Jayadeva and Kazi Nazrul Islam
1982	Maatir Swarga	"Shon Ekti Kotha"	Shyamal Mitra		Along with Jayadeva and Kazi Nazrul Islam
1982	Maatir Swarga	"Thakite Chandan Bone"	Shyamal Mitra		Along with Jayadeva and Kazi Nazrul Islam
1982	Maatir Swarga	"Ami Haripurer Rajar Gyne"	Shyamal Mitra		Along with Jayadeva and Kazi Nazrul Islam
1982	Prafulla	"Tumi Hole Gharer Lakshmi"	Kalipada Sen		
1982	Sonar Bangla	"All songs"	Nita Sen		
1982	Aparupa	"All songs"	R. D. Burman		
1982	Agent Raaj	"Jei Na Tumi Takale"	Bappi Lahiri		Along with Rabindranath Tagore, Pulak Bandyopadhyay & Gulzar
1982	Agent Raaj	"Disco Is Necessary"	Bappi Lahiri		Along with Rabindranath Tagore, Pulak Bandyopadhyay & Gulzar
1982	Sankalpa	"All songs"	Ajoy Das		
1983	Duti Pata	"All songs"	Mrinal Banerjee		
1983	Utsharga	"All songs"	Anal Chatterjee		
1983	Agradani	"Keno Keno Herilam Tore"	Kalipada Sen		Along with Subodh Majumder
1983	Agradani	"Shon Gaayer Math Ghat"	Kalipada Sen		Along with Subodh Majumder
1983	Samapti	"All songs"	Ajoy Das		
1983	Arpita	"He Sagar"	Dilip Sarkar		Along with Biru Mukherjee, Dilip Sarkar & Lakshmikanta Ray
1983	Arpita	"Ogo Ke Tumi"	Dilip Sarkar		Along with Biru Mukherjee, Dilip Sarkar & Lakshmikanta Ray
1983	Agamikal	"All songs"	Laxmikant–Pyarelal		
1983	Pratidan	"All songs"	Bappi Lahiri		
1984	Boxer	"All songs"	R. D. Burman		
1984	Simanta Raag	"All songs"	Nita Sen		
1984	Shilalipi	"Bela Seshe"	Suparnakanti Ghosh		Along with Palash Banerjee
1984	Shilalipi	"Dharmer Ghat"	Suparnakanti Ghosh		Along with Palash Banerjee
1984	Shilalipi	"Surya Gelo Astachale"	Suparnakanti Ghosh		Along with Palash Banerjee
1984	Lal Golap	"All songs"	Dilip–Dilip		
1984	Abhishek	"All songs"	Nachiketa Ghosh, Nita Sen		
1984	Raashiphal	"All songs"	Manas Mukherjee		
1984	Teen Murti	"All songs"	R. D. Burman		
1985	Sonar Sansar	"All songs"	Kamal Ganguly		
1985	Hulusthul	"Bhalobasha Jeno"	Dilip–Dilip		Along with G. S. Nepali
1985	Hulusthul	"Amar E Gaan"	Dilip–Dilip		Along with G. S. Nepali
1985	Hulusthul	"Tomar Praner"	Dilip–Dilip		Along with G. S. Nepali
1985	Ajante	"Ami Emoni Ekta Manush Chai"	Hemanta Mukherjee		Along with Atul Prasad Sen
1985	Ajante	"Oi Jhanda Ta"	Hemanta Mukherjee		Along with Atul Prasad Sen
1985	Ajante	"Shyam Humare"	Hemanta Mukherjee		Along with Atul Prasad Sen
1985	Ajante	"Come Sing"	Hemanta Mukherjee		Along with Atul Prasad Sen
1985	Ajante	"Amar Lyaj O Nei"	Hemanta Mukherjee		Along with Atul Prasad Sen
1985	Phoolan Devi	"All songs"	Ravindra Jain		
1985	Aloye Phera	"All songs"	Himanshu Biswas		
1985	Antarale	"Aaj Ei Dintake"	Bappi Lahiri		Along with Mukul Dutt
1985	Antarale	"Amar Gaa Chhamchham Kore"	Bappi Lahiri		Along with Mukul Dutt
1985	Antarale	"Phool Phute Jhore Jaai"	Bappi Lahiri		Along with Mukul Dutt
1985	Anyay Abichar	"All songs"	R. D. Burman		
1986	Anurager Chhowan	"Ami Je Ke Tomar – Male"	Ajoy Das		Along with Pulak Bandyopadhyay
1986	Anurager Chhowan	"Ami Je Ke Tomar – Female"	Ajoy Das		Along with Pulak Bandyopadhyay
1986	Anurager Chhowan	"E Mon Amar Hariye Jay"	Ajoy Das		Along with Pulak Bandyopadhyay
1986	Anurager Chhowan	"Gun Gun Kare Mon"	Ajoy Das		Along with Pulak Bandyopadhyay
1986	Anurager Chhowan	"Ja Peyechhi"	Ajoy Das		Along with Pulak Bandyopadhyay
1986	Kenaram Becharam	"All songs"	Shyamal Mitra		
1986	Dui Adhyay	"O Babuji Babuji Go"	Soumitra Banerjee		Along with Hiren Bose, Mukul Dutt & Ajoy Biswas
1986	Dui Adhyay	"O Byata Thater Thakur"	Soumitra Banerjee		Along with Hiren Bose, Mukul Dutt & Ajoy Biswas
1986	Dui Adhyay	"Se Raat Phire Asbe Na"	Soumitra Banerjee		Along with Hiren Bose, Mukul Dutt & Ajoy Biswas
1986	Uttar Lipi	"All songs"	Dilip–Dilip		
1986	Ashirbad	"All songs"	Hemanta Mukherjee		
1986	Daktar Bou	"All songs"	Pabitra Chatterjee		
1986	Madhumoy	"All songs"	Dilip–Dilip		
1986	Amar Kantak	"All songs"	Ajoy Das		
1986	Prem Bandhan	"Shon Re Pakhi"	Kamal Ganguly		Along with Shibdas Banerjee
1986	Prem Bandhan	"Samajer Hainara"	Kamal Ganguly		Along with Shibdas Banerjee
1986	Prem Bandhan	"Ei Jouban"	Kamal Ganguly		Along with Shibdas Banerjee
1986	Prem Bandhan	Amrita Prem Roger Rugi"	Kamal Ganguly		Along with Shibdas Banerjee
1987	Pratikaar	"All songs"	Bappi Lahiri		
1987	Nyay Adhikar	"All songs"	Mrinal Banerjee		
1987	Dabar Chaal	"Prem To Dabar Chaal"	Asima Mukherjee		Along with Anil Dasgupta & Pulak Bandyopadhyay

== Legacy ==
On 12 February 2011, marking the 25th anniversary of his death, a musical evening was organized at Nazrul Mancha, Kolkata to pay tribute to his legacy and contribution to Bengali Cinema. Lopamudra, Shaan, Bappi Lahiri, Srikanta Acharya and Arati Mukherjee among others were in attendance. Sovan Chatterjee, the mayor of Kolkata at that time, along with Satabdi Roy and Debasish Kumar set the ball rolling for the evening. In October 2012 he was awarded the prestigious Bangladesh Mukti Yoddha Sammanana Trophy (posthumously) by Sheikh Hasina, the Prime Minister of Bangladesh for his famous composition "Shono Ekti Mujiburer Theke" and "Mago Vabna Keno" which became the anthem for Bangladesh War of Liberation in 1971.
