= Neeta Sen =

- Born: Neeta Sen; Kolkata, India
- Genres: Indian classical music; Bhajans
- Occupations: Singer; Music director; Classical Vocalist

Neeta Sen (1935 – 1 April 2006) was an Indian classical music director and singer.

== Career ==
Trained in Indian classical music, she started her career with the All India Radio in Kolkata. Neeta Sen focused on modern Bengali music during the early part of her career. In 1977, she achieved commercial success with the Bengali feature film Baba Taraknath, directed by A K Chatterjee and starring Biswajeet, Sandhya Roy and Sulochana. She went on to direct music in more Bengali films like Krishna Bhakta Sudhama. A deeply devout person personally, her work was almost completely dominated by devotional films, television serials and music albums in her later years.

She went on to direct music in several noted films like Rokto Joba, Nandan (1979), Sita (1980), Golap Bou (1977), Sonar Bangla (1982) and Baba Loknath (1994). Another Film 'Pahari Phool', though as a movie it was not a great success, but it carries the signature of the beauty and innovation of her music composition; play backed by Manna Dey, Arati Mukherjee, Arundhati HomChowdhury et al. She worked in Mumbai briefly post marriage before moving back to Kolkata. Music composed by her has been sung by eminent Bengali and Indian singers including Hemanta Mukherjee, Kishore Kumar, Asha Bhosle, Anuradha Paudwal, Bhupender Singh, Srikanta Acharya and Aarti Mukherjee. She worked closely with celebrated and renowned Bengali lyricist Gouri Prasanna Majumdar. Following his demise she founded the Gouriprasanna Smriti Samsad, a committee to keep the memory of his music alive.

Neeta went on to teach music and prominent Bengali singers like Sreeradha Banerjee and Ruprekha Chatterjee have since trained under her. Some of her well-known songs are Oh go Nayoner Abir, Mon Jodi Kono Din Projapoti Hoye Jay, Chokhe Chokh Rekhe and Tomar Du Chokh Pujor Prodip hole. During her career in AIR she sang Bengali songs like Boshonto Bela, Amaye bhulbe ki, Maloti, Akash Golpo Bole and Jonakir Deep Gulo. Neeta Sen did her earlier training with noted musician of the era Sudhirlal Chakraborty where her co learners were Utpala Sen, Shyamal Mitra amongst others. She also won the first prize in the classical singing competition in DoverLane Music conference in the same year where Basari Lahiri ( Bappi Lahiri's mother) won in the Kheyal category.

== Filmography ==
- Baba Taraknath (1977)
- Krishna Bhakta Sudhama
- Rokto Joba
- Nandan (1979)
- Sita (1980)
- Golap Bou (1977)
- Sonar Bangla (1982)
- Baba Loknath (1994)
- Pahari Phool

== Personal life ==
Born to Jagadish Bardhan and Abha Bardhan on 13 November 1927 she was the second daughter with three sisters and one brother. She married Sunil Sen and had a daughter and a son.

== Final illness and death ==
Neeta gave up eating meat in her later years. A frail person, she started suffering from colitis from a young age. On 31 March 2006, she started getting severe abdominal pains and died on 1 April 2006.

== List of songs composed by Neeta Sen ==
- Phaguai Ke Kumari
- Tomar Chandra Surya O Duti Chokh
- Shiv Shambhu Tripurari
- Andhakar Sudhu Andhakar
- Tini Ekti Belpatate Tushta
- Amake Bhalobaso
- Amar Jibon - Andhare
- Chokhe Chokh Rekhe
- Chhum Chhum Chhum
- Tomar Charaner Dhwani
- Panchapradipe Dhupe Tomare Arati Kori
- Bhole Baba Par Lagao
- Tumi Pathor Na Ki Pran
- Tora Haat Dhor Protigga Kor
- Jharna Achhe Pahar Achhe
- Piner Chhayamakha Ankabanka Poth Dhore
- Haay Eki Shunilam
