= Chhoti Si Mulaqat =

1967 film by Alo Sircar

- Directed by: Alo Sircar
- Written by: Story; Ashapoorna Devi; Screenplay; Pronab Roy; Sachin Bhowmik; Abrar Alvi (dialogues)
- Based on: Agni Pariksha by Asha Purna Devi
- Produced by: Uttam Kumar
- Starring: Uttam Kumar; Vyjayanthimala; Rajendra Nath; Shashikala; Tarun Bose; Veena
- Cinematography: Kanai Dey
- Edited by: V.K.Naik; Madan Gupte
- Music by: Shankar Jaikishan
- Distributed by: Our Movies
- Release date: 1 January 1967 (India)
- Running time: 142 minutes
- Country: India
- Language: Hindi

Chhoti Si Mulaqat (English: A Brief Interaction) is a 1967 Indian Hindi-language romantic drama film directed by Alo Sarkar starring Uttam Kumar and Vyjayanthimala. It is a remake of 1954 Bengali film Agni Pariksha directed by Agradoot (Note: The pen name of a group of Indian film technicians in Bengali cinema signing collectively as director.) which was an adaption of Asha Purna Devi's novel of the same name.

== Plot ==
Rupa goes on a trip with her grandmother to the village where they meet the ailing Rai Saheb, a wealthy old gentleman. Rai Saheb has a grandson, Rajju, whom Rai Saheb and Rupa's grandfather had long ago decided would someday be married to Rupa. Rai Saheb uses emotional blackmail to persuade Rupa's grandmother to agree to an engagement between Rupa and Rajju. But then Rai Saheb has a heart attack and on his deathbed, he insists that Rupa and Rajju be married immediately. Both the children are underage and do not know nor understand that they have been married. Rupa's mother, back at home discovers the truth and vows to wipe out every single memory of Rupa ever being married. Years later, Rupa has now grown up to be a lovely young lady and is in love with Ashok. Rupa introduces Ashok to her mother, who approves of him, and plans are set to marry them. Then, Roopa finds out that she was married when she was young. This creates a conflict within her. Others too find out and all of a sudden Roopa is ostracized. To add menace to the situation, Rupa's cousin Sonia plots to separate Ashok from her. Finally, she returns to her in-laws' place, only to find that her childhood husband is none other than Ashok.

== Cast ==
- Uttam Kumar as Ashok
- Vyjayanthimala as Rupa
- Shashikala as Sonia
- Rajendra Nath as Sam Kapoor
- Tarun Bose as Shankar Choudhary
- Veena
- Pratima Devi
- Badri Prasad as Rai Saheb
- Sulochana Chatterjee
- Yogita Bali as child Rupa

== Music ==
The Music of the film was composed by the maestro duo Shankar–Jaikishan. The music of the film was one of the highlights of the film. Singers like Mohammed Rafi, Suman Kalyanpur, Asha Bhosle and Lata Mangeshkar lent their voices for the album. The music album was produced by producer Uttam Kumar. The album was a big hit but the film was a disaster.

#	Song	Singer
1	"Na Mukhda Modke Jaao"	Mohammed Rafi
2	"Ae Chand Ki Zebaayi"	Mohammed Rafi
3	"Tujhe Dekha, Tujhe Chaha"	Mohammed Rafi, Suman Kalyanpur
4	"Choti Si Mulaqat Pyar Ban Gayi"	Mohammed Rafi, Asha Bhosle
5	"Mat Jaa, Mat Jaa Mere Bachpan"	Asha Bhosle
6	"Kal Nahi Paaye Jiya More Piya"	Lata Mangeshkar
7	"Jeevan Ke Doraahe Pe Khade"	Lata Mangeshkar
