= Agni Pariksha (1954 film) =

- Poster of Agni Pariksha
- Directed by: Agradoot (Note: The pen name of a group of Indian film technicians in Bengali cinema signing collectively as director.)
- Written by: Ashapoorna Devi
- Screenplay by: Nitai Bhattachariya
- Based on: Agni Pariksha by Asha Purna Devi
- Produced by: Tarak Pal
- Starring: Uttam Kumar; Suchitra Sen
- Cinematography: Bibhuti Laha; Bijoy Ghosh
- Edited by: Santosh Ganguly
- Music by: Anupam Ghatak
- Production company: M. P. Productions
- Distributed by: D Looks Films Distributors Limited
- Release date: 3 September 1954
- Running time: 120 min
- Country: India
- Language: Bengali

Agni Pariksha (alternatively Agni Pareeksha or Agni Pariksha or Agnipariksha, transl. The Test Of Fire) is a 1954 Indian Bengali-language romantic drama film directed by Agradoot and starred Uttam Kumar and Suchitra Sen. The film was adapted from Asha Purna Devi's novel of the same name. The film became an overwhelming success critically and commercially. It was remade in Hindi in 1967 as Chhoti Si Mulaqat also starring Uttam Kumar. Before that, the movie was simultaneously made into a 1959 Telugu-Tamil bilingual titled Mangalya Balam in Telugu and Manjal Mahimai in Tamil.

The plot centers on an educated young girl who falls in love with Kiriti. However, the fact that she was married as a child poses a hurdle; she decides to face her past to move ahead in life. This was one of the earlier romantic films with a theme of the typical and regular masala pictures of Bollywood at that time. The film was highly noted for the pairing and chemistry of Kumar and Sen and its outstanding music.

The movie is considered a trend setter for the Bengali film industry. As a contemporary masala (a genre of film which mixes multiple genres) romantic film, it quickly gained popularity among Bengali demographics. The film reached the industry on a new height and was a major breakthrough film for Kumar and Sen, who both witnessed a rise in fame following its release.

== Plot ==
The story revolves around Tapasi, a singer who has been married forcefully as a child to an old village zamindar's grandson Bulu. Back at home, her parents discover the truth and vow to wipe out every single memory of Tapasi ever being married. Years later, Tapasi has now grown up to be a lovely young lady and is in love with Kiriti. She introduces Kiriti to her mother, who approves of him, and plans to marry them. Things change when Tapasi finds out that she was already been married off in her childhood. This creates a conflict as others find out this secret and ostracize Tapasi. How will Tapasi and Kiriti deal with this stigma? Will they triumph in their love?

== Cast ==
- Uttam Kumar as Kiriti Mukherjee
- Suchitra Sen as Tapasi Banerjee
- Anup Kumar
- Jahar Ganguly
- Jahor Roy
- Kamal Mitra
- Panchanan Bhattacharya
- Bibhu Bhattacharya
- Shikharani Bag
- Shyamali Chakraborty
- Suprabha Mukhopadhyay
- Aparna Debi
- Jamuna Singha
- Sabita Bhattacharya

== Soundtrack ==
Agni Pariksha

Soundtrack album by Anupam Ghatak
- Released: 1954
- Genre: Feature Film Soundtrack
- Length: 0:17:10
- Label: Angel Digital Pvt Ltd
- Producer: Tarak Pal

Anupam Ghatak has composed all the songs for the film while Gauriprasanna Mazumder has written all the lyrics.

Songs
No.	Title	Playback	Length
1.	"Aaj Achhi Kal Nei"	Alpana Banerjee	3:02
2.	"Gane Mor Kon Indradhanu"	Sandhya Mukherjee	3:07
3.	"Jodi Bhul Korei"	Sandhya Mukherjee	2:22
4.	"Jibon Nodir Jowar Bhata"	Satinath Mukherjee	3:00
5.	"Ke Tumi Amare Dako"	Sandhya Mukherjee	3:16
6.	"Phuler Kane Bhramar"	Sandhya Mukherjee	2:23
Total length:			17:10

== Production ==
The film is based on the novel of the legendary writer Ashapurna Devi. At first production thoughts, the team wanted to cast Bikash Roy and Anubha Gupta as the main lead but with the pressure of director Bibhuti Laha, the production team changed their decision and cast Uttam Kumar and Suchitra Sen. The technicians and production team were highly confident about Kumar and Sen's capability on the story. The film music was composed by Anupam Ghatak and the lyrics were written by Gauriprasanna Majumder, who mended his lyrics 22 times for the film with instructions of the director. The film was shot in Darjeeling but a small portion was shot in a studio.

== Themes and influences ==
The story of the film talks about child marriage and the family structure of many families of Bangladesh after the partition. This film set a benchmark for how the zamindari system with its urban nobility, the attitude of the younger ones towards the elders within the zamindari house, and the emotional tensions of the upper-class family can build or break the ideal of a woman.

== Release ==
The film released at the time of Durga Puja season on 3 September 1954, which was the day on which Kumar was born. The film was advertised in cities with the writing on the poster: "Agnipariksha : New application of love".

== Reception ==
The film became a trend setter for Bengali cinema. This first-considered masala romantic film influenced the cinema industry. The film was a breakthrough for both Uttam Kumar and Suchitra Sen and also for Sandhya Ray and Gauriprasanna Mazumder. The film was also highlighted for its music which in the main elements "gives a new vibe". This created a new era of romance in Bengal. Kumar and Sen later went on to create popularity among the Bengal masses. The pair was highly appreciated by the people. This led to more films for the pair throughout the decades. After the film, Uttam Kumar ruled in Bengali cinema until his death.

During that time, Hindi cinema was dominant in Bengal. Bengali films did not do well. But the film changed the situation and brought back the majority audience permanently in Bengali cinema. The film created a record at the box office and became an all-time blockbuster, running for 126 days in theatres. This was also the beginning of Kumar's dominance at puja box office. It collected over five times its budget. It became the highest grossing Bengali film of 1954.

== Controversy ==
On seeing the poster of Agnipariksha, Uttam's wife Gauri Devi and Suchitra's husband Dibanath both thought there had been a real love affair between Uttam and Suchitra. In the poster was written "Agnipariksha : Amader Pronoyer Sakshi". Upon seeing the poster and text, Dibanath and Gauri became angry on Uttam and Suchitra which led to problems between them.

== Remakes ==
The film was remade in Telugu and Tamil in 1959 as Mangalya Balam and Manjal Mahimai respectively, starring Savitri and the famous Telugu star ANR. The film was remade in Hindi as Chhoti Si Mulaqat with Uttam Kumar producing and reprising his role and Vyjaianthimala in the role of Suchitra Sen.
