= Aaj Ei Dintake =

1985 song by Kishore Kumar

Song by Kishore Kumar

from the album Antarale
- Language: Bengali
- English title: Write about today's day in the book of your mind
- Released: July 26, 1985
- Length: 4:27
- Label: Saregama
- Composer: Bappi Lahiri
- Lyricist: Gauriprasanna Mazumdar
- Producer: Bappi Lahiri

Music video
- "Aaj Ei Dintake" on YouTube

"Aaj Ei Dintake" (Bengali: আজ এই দিনটাকে মনের খাতায় লিখে রাখো) is a Bengali romantic song by Indian singer Kishore Kumar, released as a song accompanying the 1985 film Antarale, directed by Shantanu Mitra, and produced by Unit–82. The song was written by lyricist Gauriprasanna Mazumdar and composed, arranged and produced by Bappi Lahiri, under the record label of Saregama. It remains one of the most popular Bengali romantic songs, widely played during festive seasons.

== Background and composition ==
Actor Chiranjeet Chakraborty had acted in one of his first hit films, Shatru. Next, he was designated to play a role in Antarale, scheduled to release in on July 26, 1985. During the film's shooting, director Shantanu Mitra gave him a tape which contained the then recorded "Aaj Ei Dintake" sung by Kishore Kumar. It was not yet mixed and mastered for commercial release. Chakraborty was surprised to know that Kishore Kumar had sung a playback song that was picturized on him, having acted in a few films. Chakraborty being surprised, played the song on the tape eight times in a row back and forth, listening carefully. He spoke about the song's background and composition in an musical event remembering Kumar.

Chakraborty had met Kishore Kumar earlier while working with Amit Kumar on the film Gayok. He commented on the meeting, that a portion of the film was filmed at the home of Kumar. While the shooting was ongoing, Kishore Kumar returned to the home while humming the song "Diner Sheshe Ghumer Deshe". Earlier that day, Kumar recorded a song designated for a Rabindra sangeet song album. After meeting Chakraborty, he suggested him to go to Mumbai to star in Hindi films, ending with only a small talk.

== Reception ==
Samarjit Guha of The Telegraph, based in India, wrote about the song in an article: "Another Kishore Kumar gem from the film Antarale, it continues to be played during festive seasons. All para loudspeakers play it, making us nostalgic about the Chiranjit starrer. Gouriprasanna Mazumdar wrote the lyrics, keeping nostalgia in mind."

Sagorika Roy of The Telegraph remarked about "Aaj Ei Dintake", writing that "Aaj Ei Dintake" has become one of the most popular soundtracks played across Durga Puja pandals by their organizers, giving the feelings for the festivals ahead of the pujas. Roy writes that the song lifts the mood off for mornings of Durga puja.

Prothom Alo wrote about the song remembering Kishore Kumar: "Kishore Kumar, who has passed away on his death journey, is still sitting in the hearts of the people of Bengal with immortality. That is why, perhaps, we have to borrow a line from the song he sang and say—'Write this day in your mind's notebook today', today is the day of Kishore's death."

== Recreations ==
A cover version of the song named "Aaj Ei Dintake - Unplugged" was sung by Addit Roy, with music rearrranged by R3lic AT2.

A cover version of the song was performed by Raj Barman, with music rearrangement done by Subhadeep Sarkar and with mixing and mastering by Debabrata Majumder.

On the 25th death anniversary of Mazumdar, in 2011, "Aaj Ei Dintake" was presented in the concert that was arranged by the Response Group. It was rearranged by Shomu Mitra. Singers Srikanta Acharya, Bappi Lahiri and others sung his songs there.
