= Anupam Ghatak =

Indian composer (1911-1956)

- Born: 11 April 1911; Pathrail, Bengal Presidency, British India
- Died: 12 December 1956 (aged 45); Calcutta, West Bengal, India
- Occupation: Music director

Sandhya Mukhopadhyay singing "Gane more kon Indrodhonu"
Music composer Anupam Ghatak, Lyricist Gauriprasanna Majumdar, Singer Sandhya Mukhopadhyay

Anupam Ghatak was a prominent 20-century composer of Bengali music in India, particularly for films. He is best known for the 1954 Bengali-language film Agni Pariksha.
