= Hemanta Mukherjee and Uttam Kumar =

Cinema duo

Hemanta Mukherjee (left) and Uttam Kumar (right) in 1957/1958.

The Bengali playback singer–composer Hemanta Mukherjee and the Bengali film actor and producer Uttam Kumar were frequent collaborators and close friends in Bengali cinema and music. They are also known as Hemanta–Uttam and Uttam–Hemanta. Their collaborations mainly consisted of Kumar lip-syncing on songs recorded by Mukherjee, or Mukherjee singing for other actors in films where Kumar starred under his suggestion.

Their first cinema collaboration is believed to be the 1951 film Sahajatri, where Mukherjee sang three songs for which Kumar lip-synced in the film. But prints and copies of the film were largely lost, which caused ambiguity in determination of their first actual collaboration in cinema. Later in 1955, their first major film project was Shap Mochan, which is also regarded as one of their biggest collaborations. Because of unavailability and obscureness of previous motion pictures and digital works, Shap Mochan is often considered the first film they worked on. Following the film's success, Mukherjee and Kumar worked together in several trivial films which were not able to secure much popularity. Their film collaborations remained small until the release of 1957 film Harano Sur, received well by critics, watchers and listeners of its soundtrack and songs. The duo's next major film Indrani (1958) featured songs composed by Nachiketa Ghosh and lyrics by Gauriprasanna Mazumder, in which Mukherjee and Kumar effectively had no role in the lyrics and music other than singing and lip-syncing them, outputting a few well-known Bengali songs. While both Mukherjee and Kumar had understanding of lyrics and music, and sang and composed many songs, neither of them wrote songs. They worked most frequently with lyricist Gauriprasanna Mazumder.

Harano Sur and Indrani were followed-up by Mukherjee and Kumar with the movies Tasher Ghar, Prithibi Amare Chay, Bondhu, Chaowa Pawa, Marutirtha Hinglaj, Kuhak, Saptapadi, Dui Bhai, Shudhu Ekti Bachhar, Kal Tumi Aleya, Stree, Sonar Khancha and many others. Saptapadi remains their most popular cinema collaboration, receiving acclaim for the song "Ei Path Jodi Na Shes Hoy".

Both Kumar and Mukherjee admired and had respect for each other, with them also making various positive statements about the other; though they were also viewed to have experienced several disputes and altercations resulting in the duo abstaining from most exclusive collaborations for a temporary period starting from about 1962 and continuing to an assumed early 1970s. Many other singer–composers including Shyamal Mitra and Manna Dey participated in singing for Kumar during this period. In 1976, Mukherjee and Kumar's affiliated radio program Devi Durgatiharini experienced largely negative feedback and criticism despite popularity, which led their names being on the receiving end of public backlash for a long time. Their collaborations ended in 1980 with Kumar's death.

== First collaborations ==
Hemanta Mukherjee and Uttam Kumar knew each other from their early lives and became friends, living in the same locality. Mukherjee is believed to have first sung for Uttam Kumar in the 1951 film Sahajatri, directed by Agradoot and produced by M. P. Productions. The filmmakers first selected Kumar and gave him a minor role in the film, with Asit Baran playing one of the lead roles, but Kumar was later cast in Baran's place from the actor dropping out of the film. In this film, he was put in the credits for the first time with his nickname "Uttam Kumar", with earlier film crediting Kumar with his birth name Arun Kumar Chatterjee and sometimes Arup Kumar and Uttam Chatterjee. Mukherjee sang three songs that were picturized on Kumar, namely "Phul hase aar cheye dekhi", "Bhalobasar parashmani kothay tare pai" and "Gagane saghana ghata uraye ke" composed by Robin Chatterjee.

However, the prints and copies of Sahajatri and its songs were largely destroyed or lost, which made the verification of Mukherjee's vocals given for Kumar difficult to confirm. Researcher Susanta Kumar Chatterjee stated that this was the first de facto collaboration between them, talking about the movie.

The first major project in which Mukherjee and Kumar collaborated was the 1955 film Shap Mochan, directed by Sudhir Mukherjee. Mukherjee wanted musician Sachin Dev Burman to compose the songs for the film, and traveled to Bombay to meet him. In Bombay, Burman said that he could not spare time for him and had other projects in schedule. Hemanta Mukherjee at that time was staying in another city, and received news about Sudhir Mukherjee, prompting him to later visit Sudhir Mukherjee in an uninvited event; after which Sudhir Mukherjee accepted Hemanta to be the composer for Shap Mochan. The four songs in it "Bosey aachhi patho cheye", "Surer akashe tumi je go shuktara", "Jhar uthechhe baul batas" and "Shono bondhu shono" were written by poet Bimal Ghosh, with Mukherjee later "amazed by the reception of Shapmochan. The songs breathed life into the film and were loved by all."

Mukherjee in a conversation recollected his work for making the music for Shap Mochan. Mukherjee during the post-production of the movie worked in Bollywood music and was in-progress of producing a South Indian film. Mukherjee recalled that one day, he and his assistants flew to Kolkata, where after watching the entire film, gave thought to how the music direction should be handled. Mukherjee was given one night to compose the background music and the songs. The musicians from Kolkata he brought for working on it were unwilling to work the night. "Four of us Robi, Rijbart, Nabin Sur and I [Mukherjee] worked on the music throughout the night".

== Collaborations in Bengali cinema ==
=== Minor films by the duo (1956–1957) ===
Following the success of the background music and soundtrack of Shap Mochan, which was received well by listeners and film watchers in 1955, Mukherjee worked as the composer for the songs of the films Surjamukhi (1956), Shesh Parichay (1957) and Tasher Ghar (1957). Of these, Kumar acted in only Tasher Ghar directed by Mangal Chakraborty. These three films were not successful at the box office and could not attain popularity. Their next major film was Harano Sur.

=== Harano Sur (1957) ===
Harano Sur was among the first films to feature the acting duo Uttam–Suchitra (Uttam Kumar and Suchitra Sen) who collaborated on multiple films afterwards, with many of them being picturized on Kumar that were sung by Mukherjee. After Shap Mochan, Mukherjee's next successful music project was Harano Sur, with song lyrics written by the Bengali lyricist Gauriprasanna Mazumder, directed by Ajoy Kar and the film adapted from the 1942 American film Random Harvest.

The two songs in the film "Tumi Je Amar" and "Aaj Dujanar Duti Path" as written by Mazumder, were composed by Mukherjee. According to historian Manek Premchand, Mukherjee had spent about forty-five minutes to compose both songs by himself, for which he was criticized by the filmmakers, who recommended replacing "Tumi Je Amar" with another existing song. He was also met with opposition for choosing Geeta Dutt to sing "Tumi Je Amar" picturized on Suchitra Sen. Singer Sandhya Mukherjee at the time sang the most songs lip-synced by Sen. Mukherjee kept his decision to have Dutt sing it and did not agree with the filmmakers to replace any song from the film, written by Premchand to be "massive hits" and one of the most iconic songs of the Uttam–Hemanta duo.

"Tumi Je Amar" is used two times in Harano Sur with a slight variation, the second use being an attempt to remind Alok Mukherjee (Uttam Kumar) of previous years in the plot. In a song sequence in the film, Kumar is shown to call Roma (Suchitra Sen) by voice a few times. Kumar was "unable to attend the dubbing sessions" for the scenes. For which Mukherjee used his voice to dub over Kumar's voice, using his voice in calling out Roma, which after the film was released, "no one noticed it wasn't Uttam’s voice".

=== Indrani (1958) ===
The 1958 film Indrani was one of the first blockbuster films of the acting duo Uttam–Suchitra (Uttam Kumar and Suchitra Sen) and one of the most successful projects of duo Mukherjee and Kumar, getting positive reception in its soundtrack. It was directed by Niren Lahiri, focusing on "Indrani's journey and the agonising ramifications of her transformation from a young college girl to a powerful woman" and others. Its songs also became hits, "remembered for their picturizations and melodies". Four songs from the film, "Neer Choto Khoti Nei" by Mukherjee, "Jhanak Jhanak" by Geeta Dutt, "Sabhi Kuch Lutakar" by Mohammad Rafi and "Surjo Dobar Pala" by Mukherjee are popular. All songs were written by Gauriprasanna Mazumder and composed by Nachiketa Ghosh.

=== Marutirtha Hinglaj (1959) ===
After Indrani, Mukherjee's next major project as a singer and composer was Marutirtha Hinglaj, released in 1959. Kumar and Sabitri Chatterjee played the lead roles, with Bikash Roy (also the film director), Chhaya Devi and others playing supporting characters. It included two songs in Sanskrit language: "Sarbasya Buddhirupena" (from Saptasati Chandi) and "Hey Chandrachur" (from Shiva Naamavali Ashtakam) belonging to ancient religious scriptures, for which Mukherjee took the responsibility to compose himself.

In the words of the film director and producer Bikash Roy, Mukherjee recorded the four songs in a recording studio located in Kolkata, but said he could not feel the atmosphere and words there, and asked Roy that he would re-record them in a recording studio in Bombay city. Roy, a few days before suffered losses while shooting the film in the seaside town Digha, where a storm happened during the session causing the artists being unable to work but still being paid their due remuneration.

A few days later, Mukherjee flew to Bombay and recorded the four songs again, after when he flew back to Kolkata and gave Roy two spools, telling "Here are the songs for Marutirtha Hinglaj, I got these recorded in Bombay. Check these." Roy expressed concern whether the artists in Bombay knew Bengali language in which the songs were recorded in. Mukherjee replied to him that he got singers Lata Mangeshkar and Geeta Dutt to sing the chorus parts of some of the songs. The other two songs in it were "Pother Klanti Bhule" and "Tomar Bhubone Mago" composed by Mukherjee depicting pilgrims on their journey, and written by Mazumder.

=== Saptapadi (1961) ===
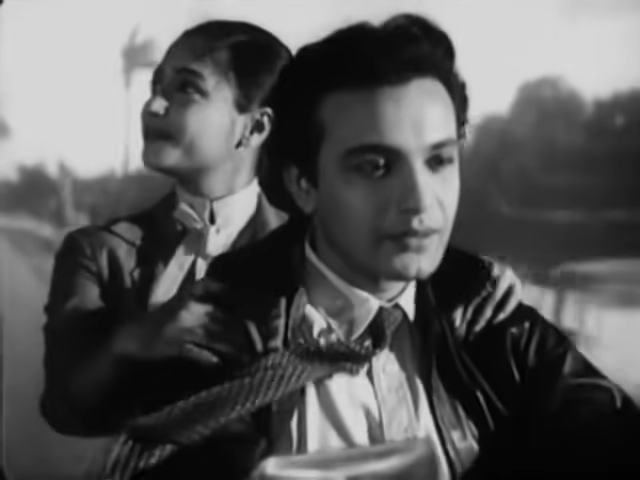
A still picture from "Ei Path Jodi Na Shes Hoy".

Saptapadi is widely considered as one of the most popular and successful films of Mukherjee and Kumar. Its director and cinematographer was Ajoy Kar, the story was given by Tarashankar Bandyopadhyay with screenplay and dialogues by Binoy Chattopadhyay (according to Maitreyee B. Chowdhury). The music for the film was composed by Mukherjee, with all song lyrics also written by Mazumder. Mukherjee's soundtrack is said to give insights into the contemporary Bengali society at the time of the film, which was under threats ranging from the British rule to the World War II and several other factors.

Mukherjee chose the English singer Suzi Miller to sing the song "On The Merry-Go-Round" featured in it, picturized on Sen, which is termed as an "English rock and roll song". Mukherjee also brought singers from outside Bengal to sing for his films, often in Bengali.

The most famous song from Saptapadi was "Ei Path Jodi Na Shes Hoy" (English translation: May we never fall out of that time), rendered as a song between Hemanta Mukherjee and Sandhya Mukherjee, termed to "hold a special place in Bengali cinema and culture." According to Manek Premchand:

Hemant Kumar also had Sandhya Mukherjee creating magic with those 'la-la-la' and 'Tumi bolo' phrases in the iconic romantic duet 'Ei poth jodi na shesh hoy', again from Saptapadi picturised on Uttam Kumar and Suchitra Sen enjoying a date and driving along on a motorbike. The song, essentially a Hemant solo, had each line ending in a question with Sandhya replying with 'Tumi bolo' to which Hemant would counter with 'Na, na, tumi bolo' and she would reply 'na, tumi bolo'.

During the recording of "Ei Path Jodi Na Shes Hoy", the filmmakers suggested not involving a famous singer like Sandhya Mukherjee to sing it, as they considered that the song would be fairly "easy to sing". Another "well-known" female singer was assigned for singing the parts of Mukherjee. Despite taking several takes to sing the song, the singer was unable to render the lines properly and was not able to "do justice to the song", especially the adlibs "la la la la". After which the filmmakers brought Sandhya Mukherjee to sing.

Once in a concert that took place in the movie theater Basusree Cinema located in Kolkata, Kumar and Sandhya Mukherjee sang "Ei Path Jodi Na Shes Hoy" normally until they went to the phase with the lines "Tumi bolo", at when Uttam Kumar and Sandhya Mukherjee sang the lines over and over again on demands of the audience, making playful improvisations in the song lines. The original song lyrics lasted slightly less than three minutes, with this duet taking a much longer time to end with the extra speech. With its picturization on Suchitra Sen and Kumar, Mukherjee sang the major part which was lip-synced by Kumar, and Sandhya Mukherjee's lines were lip-synced by Sen. It is regarded as a romantic song, widely considered to have the audience believe a happy ending would conclude between Sen and Kumar in the film. Often in the Kolkatan Cinema, Kumar would go to sing and Mukherjee would sit next to him, sometimes with other singers. It became one of the main songs associated with Uttam–Suchitra.

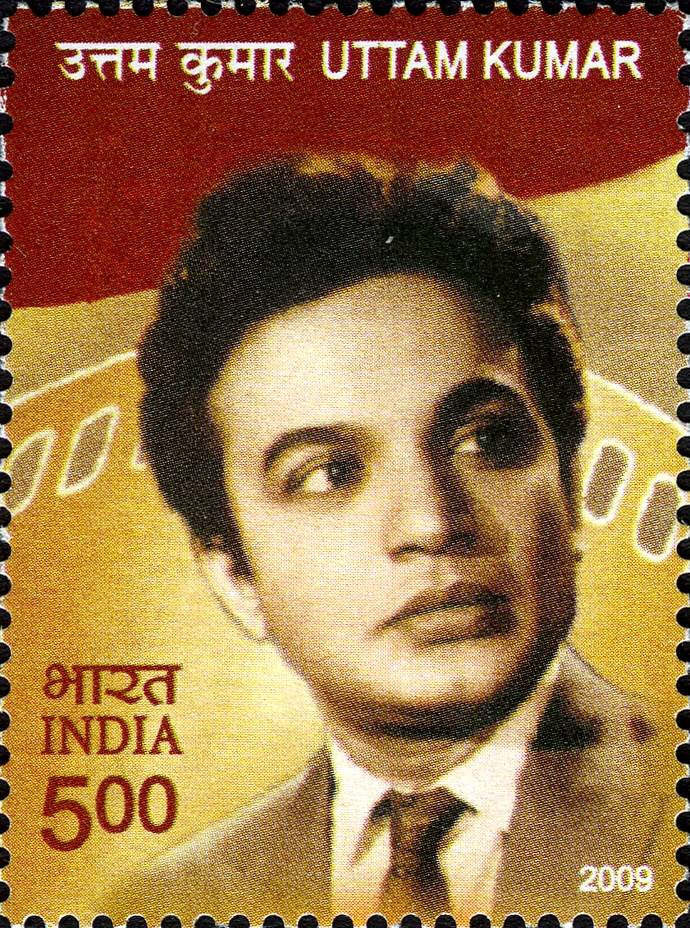
Kumar in a 2009 stamp.

In Saptapadi, Kumar played the role of Krishnendu and Sen played the role of Rina Brown. "Ei Path Jodi Na Shes Hoy" was portrayed in scenes played in the film in which Krishnendu (Kumar) and Rina Brown (Sen) are depicted riding a bike, with Kumar driving and they together singing. "Ei Path Jodi Na Shes Hoy" has "been immortalised in public memory as the film's signature song". Both the scenes and the song usage in the film have been described as an epitome of youthful romance for a generation. Another song from the film named "Ebar Kali Tomay Khabo" by Mukherejee was composed as a fusion between Western and Indian music by him, where the Western music served to contrast the class differences between the two lead characters, Krishnendu and Rina Brown.

In the book Mahanayak Revisited: The World of Uttam Kumar authored by Swapan Mullick, he writes that Kumar and Sen were originally supposed to have ridden the motorcycle used in the song in real-life. Mullick mentions Kumar's grandson Gourab Chatterjee in a footnote of the book. He writes Chatterjee claimed that Kumar and Sen "never actually sat on the BMW bike for the song sung by Hemanta Mukherjee and Sandhya Mukherjee". Chatterjee stated that director Ajoy Kar, also serving as the film's cinematographer, used special camera techniques and manipulated close-ups to shoot the scenes that depicted them riding the bike. Instead of Uttam–Suchitra, dummies were placed on the bikes one-by-one and filmed. The same bike was found later in a garage in Kolkata.

The bike scenes from the song were used as a template for many later romantic Bengali tracks. A portion of the cinema industry "tried to allegedly convince" Sen that she would get overshadowed by Kumar if she agreed to star beside him in the movie and the song "Ei Path Jodi Na Shes Hoy". There were rumors within Bengali cinema that said a controversy to stop the shooting was staged. The Times of India remarked about the music and film "The movie was packed with all the elements a romantic Bengalee of 1960s can dream of like the immortal music scored by Hemanta Mukhopadhyay. The outstanding camera work, brilliant script, heart-touching music and above all a giant named Uttam Kumar's one of the career best display turned 'Saptapadi' into an almost near perfect movie experience for cinelovers."

Raima Sen, granddaughter of Suchitra Sen, shared a post on Instagram featuring a still scene from "Ei Path Jodi Na Shes Hoy". She wrote in her description that the post was aimed as a tribute to Kumar, who Sen regarded by his nickname Mahanayak, also remarking that Saptapadi is among her most favorite films, regarding Kumar as a timeless legend and deeply-loved actor.

=== Dui Bhai (1961) ===
Directed by Sudhir Mukherjee, Dui Bhai was released on the same date as Saptapadi, starring Kumar in the main role. Mukherjee composed the music of the soundtrack, with lyrics given by (Gauriprasanna) Mazumder. The most popular song from the film is considered to be "Tare Bole Dio", sung and composed by Mukherjee, with Kumar lip-syncing to Mukherjee's voice in it.

=== Kal Tumi Aleya (1966) ===
Amid altercations starting from the Bees Saal Baad dispute, Mukherjee lowered his friendship with Kumar, with few films being still made with the duo. Uttam Kumar himself composed the music for the 1966 film Kal Tumi Aleya, becoming the film's music director. It was written by Ashutosh Mukhopadhyay, regarded as a complex psychological drama. The film featured Dhirupada Chakraborty (Kumar) and actor Sabitri Chatterjee and others as the main cast.

Mukherjee sang the track "Jai Chole Jai" (also known as "Ami Jai Chole Jai"), which was lip-synced by Kumar in the film and which turned out as one of the most popular songs from Kal Tumi Aleya. Kumar directed the music for the track, on lyrics written by Bengali lyricist Pulak Bandyopadhyay. This song helped Kumar become associated as a music director and composer. Mukherjee provided no additional input in the song's music other than singing it. After the recording for "Jai Chole Jai" was done, Mukherjee praised the depth of Kumar's melody and music for it, which Mukherjee said was different from the style of typical music he composed.

=== Nabarag (1971) ===
Mukherjee composed the songs for the 1971 Kumar and Sen-starrer film Nabarag directed by Bijoy Bose, although he did not sing any songs in it. He composed and arranged the music including two songs featured in the film, which were initially written and composed by the polymath Rabindranath Tagore. He brought singing exponent Sumitra Sen to vocalize the Bengali song "Tui Fele Esechis Kare", lip-synced by actress Kanika Majumdar who played a supporting role, and arranged the other songs.

=== Stree (1972) ===
The music for the 1972 Bengali film Stree was composed by music director Nachiketa Ghosh, regarded one of his most popular films he composed in the 1970s. Singer Manna Dey stated that Ghosh's work in the film "and his perfectionism were hard to beat".

Four songs in the film were rendered by Mukherjee. Kumar and actor Soumitra Chatterjee acted together in the lead roles in the film. Mukherjee's renditions were lip-synced by Chatterjee including two duets in which Chatterjee only lip-synced the song parts performed by Mukherjee. Singer Manna Dey sang the songs lip-synced by Kumar. Two songs from it were popular; Mukherjee and Dey's song "Hazar Takar Jharbatita" emerged as a hit song, assisting the box office of Stree; "Khirki Theke Singhaduar" sung by Mukherjee emerged as another hit from the film soundtrack. All songs were written by Mazumder and Pulak Bandyopadhyay.

Mukherjee's vocals for Chatterjee in "Khirki Theke Singhaduar" and "Hazar Takar Jharbatita" have been praised, depicting a village-dweller and photographer named Sitapati (Chatterjee), and in the latter with a reckless, rich landlord named Madhav (Kumar).

=== Priyo Bandhabi (1975) ===
Priyo Bandhabi was the last documented film of the cinema quartet Uttam–Suchitra–Hemanta–Sandhya. (Note: Uttam Kumar, Suchitra Sen, Hemanta Mukherjee and Sandhya Mukherjee.) Having lyrics written by Mazumder with music provided by Nachiketa Ghosh and directed by Hiren Nag, the film failed in box office, but gained historical importance because of the last presence of the quartet in the cinema industry. It was also the last film of Kumar and Sen (Uttam–Suchitra); who decided not to do any more films together for the film's box office failure. The songs from the film soundtrack were "moderate hits". Mukherjee sang the song "Ami Sahebo Noi, Golamo Noi" that was lip-synced by Kumar in the film within his role.

=== Devi Durgatiharini (1976) ===
After Harano Sur and their subsequent films, Mukherjee and Kumar became close friends in their personal lives and formed a strong partnership. In 1976, the radio-broadcast show Mahishasurmardini started by Birendra Krishna Bhadra and hosted by Akashvani Calcutta was replaced by show Devi Durgatiharini conducted by Uttam Kumar, with music provided by Mukherjee. It was reported that Kumar would "have never agreed to" host the program if Mukherjee did not assure him. It was discontinued by the next days.

Since the early 1930s, a radio program titled Mahisasurmardini played on radio to inaugurate the fortnight of Durga Puja. It included a mix of radio play, songs and music, and recitation of related texts. Pankaj Mullick composed its music and the recitation was narrated by Birendra Krishna Bhadra. From its start, the show gathered a cult following. During the period of Emergency, Delhiite bosses of radio broadcaster Prasar Bharati directed radio offices in Kolkata to start a new radio program to replace Mahisasurmardini.

In Devi Durgatiharini, Govinda Gopal Mukherjee read the texts, and Mukherjee scored the music. A cast of actors replaced the voice of Bhadra, including Kumar under recommendation from Mukherjee. However, when it was first broadcast on September 23, 1976, it received largely negative reviews and criticism, with the show being countered by protests in radio offices and protests from listeners by the next days. Other than Mukherjee, other singers including Manna Dey, Sandhya Mukherjee and Manabendra Mukherjee participated in it. It was discontinued on September 26 and Bhadra's Mahisasurmardini was brought back.

Mukherjee and Kumar received negative press from it, deemed to have been on the receiving end of public vilification. The criticism it received lowered the number of people who cared to listen to the show. Mukherjee's music and Kumar's performance in Devi Durgatiharini received praise from critics in later times. The backlash on the show surfaced by traditionalists and viewers remained after Kumar for a long time. The music became gradually one of "the best work that Hemanta had done in his later years". In 2019, Mahalaya, a film directed by Soumik Sen was released featuring actors portraying Kumar and Mukherjee, with its history.

== Personal lives ==
Mukherjee during a visit to Bangladesh.

Kumar had interests in music, for which Mukherjee was assigned most of the time in his films. He also had passions for literature, allocating time to learn about the details and personalities of the characters in his films where he served as an actor, producer or both. He would frequently visit the residences of the screenwriters and storywriters to inquire about the details of the characters, also known to carry the works of poets and authors to read in his free time. Kumar frequently discussed about literature and scripts with Mukherjee, the producers and director, when he had time and attended many literary meetings, few times with Mukherjee.

Filmmaker, film critic and Jadavpur University professor Moinak Biswas in a review of the popular melodrama in the 1950s and a relation between cinema and political history writes:

Around the middle of the 1950s, the new bourgeois melodrama in Bengal tried to synthesize a ‘vernacular’ version of the citizen, largely, I would like to suggest, by refracting the urban experience through the ‘body’ of Uttam Kumar. [...] One can sense, for example, how important Uttam Kumar’s voice was in that construction, how it lent materiality to a fantasy figure of the middle class Bengali male. One could talk about diction, about the melodic specificity of that voice, and certainly about the compound entity it created in conjunction with the playback singer Hemanta Mukherjee – perhaps the most enduring of the ephemera that shaped the fantasy figure, the cultural class identity, in question. [...] And it is even more difficult to figure the voice itself in its purity, as something that is not speech, not any specific use of the voice, and yet can be abstracted from all its uses.

Kumar admired Mukherjee, and made assessments on his personality, as well as a few other famous people he came across. Mukherjee is determined to have the greatest contribution to the publicity of Kumar and "aura about him" along with Suchitra Sen, knowing each other from their early days. Kumar felt nostalgic when he heard Mukherjee singing, "whose golden voice became synonymous with Uttam’s on the silver screen". He acknowledged Mukherjee to have an ethereal voice and excel in film songs. Before applying for singing in the Akashvani radio show Devi Durgatiharini, Kumar was hesistant to perform and felt his that his voice did not belong in the field, where Birendra Krishna Bhadra performed during and before. A musician Ashima Mukherjee and others went to and asked him to participate in the show many times, where he did not accept. Later, Mukherjee approached Kumar and convinced him to perform in it, for which Kumar agreed over their relationship; Mukherjee receiving a remuneration of ₹150 for it.

Mukherjee also had respect for Kumar, talking about him, he spoke in his words "Had there not been Uttam, had he not lip-synced my songs on screen, I wouldn’t perhaps have been the Hemanta Mukherjee I am. I would have not gained this fame. We were a unique combination." He considered Kumar to be like to him as a younger brother, saying that he loved him just as much as he would a younger brother. The relationship between them was very close and steadfast before the marriage of Moushumi Chatterjee, which author Suman Gupta considers to have been the result of Mukherjee singing his "countless and timeless" songs that were filmed in Kumar's movies with him lip-syncing, serving as a foundation for their strong personal bond. After Moushumi Chatterjee's marriage with Mukherjee's son, Hemanta Mukherjee stated that he felt sad their relationship was largely broken and not the same anymore.

For the songs of the film Antony Firingee (1967), music director Anil Bagchi approached Mukherjee for guidance regarding them. Bagchi after composing the majority of the songs for Manna Dey, had disputes with the producer, which had him come up with Mukherjee's name. Mukherjee contacted him and asked him to give the songs to Dey, allowing Kumar and Dey's relationship to be augmented, called an example of respect between Kumar and Mukherjee. Kumar and Mukherjee were close friends. Starting from Harano Sur, Kumar frequently demanded Mukherjee to sing in films he acted, asking Mukherjee to sing even when the songs were played in the background. Mukherjee said that Kumar had an understanding of songwriting and music fields, allowing him to blend his lip-syncing properly on Mukherjee's songs. For films where he did not serve as a/the composer, the songwriters often thought of assigning Kumar to lip-sync his songs, with Mukherjee citing Bondhu (composed by Nachiketa Ghosh) as an example.

== Altercations and disputes ==
=== Comments on Gauri Devi ===
Speculations arose about Mukherjee during a wedding anniversary of Gauri Devi, the first wife of Kumar, in which Devi and Kumar were present. There were contemporary reports which reported that Mukherjee said something to Gauri Devi, under "the guise of sarcasm" and in a "mocking way", which Kumar found to be "insulting and offensive", causing damage to their relationship.

=== Disputes over Bees Saal Baad ===
In the 1960s, Mukherjee composed and performed playback singing for many songs and films in both Bengali and Hindi music and cinema. Biren Nag directed the film Bees Saal Baad, which was released in 1962. Mukherjee took the responsibility as the composer and a singer for the movie, and also as the producer. Mukherjee went to Kolkata to show the script of the film to Kumar, and "really wanted Uttam Kumar to act in this film". They both by the time had become great friends in their lives. Mukherjee thought that "Uttam might agree for the sake of that great friendship". However, when Mukherjee met him, Kumar did not read the script and rejected taking the proposed role in Bees Saal Baad. According to a magazine report published during the time, Kumar had more than a dozen Bengali films to act in his schedule and felt that he would not be able to give time to another role in a film.

In a conversation with ETV Bharat, actor Biswajit Chatterjee remarked that Mukherjee came to Rangmahal Theater in Kolkata one day and took him to the backstage, where he asked Chatterjee to go to Bombay, saying that he wanted him as the hero in his film. After Chatterjee completed his work in Bees Saal Baad and it was released, Mukherjee planned another film to feature Kumar in which had a script written over 2 years. Despite Hemanta asking Kumar to act in the film multiple times, he refused.

It is alleged that Mukherjee was "quite upset by Uttam's behavior" and stopped talking with him. Afterwards, Mukherjee brought actor Biswajit Chatterjee to feature in the film in place of the role of Kumar. Mukherjee was said to have instructed Chatterjee to act and style himself in a similar way to Kumar, which resulted in Kumar distancing himself from Mukherjee, supplanting his thoughts of settling the dispute. For several years following the dispute, Mukherjee refrained from singing songs for Kumar in cinema, though he continued singing in Bengali for other films and lyricists. Per TV9 Bangla, they later settled the dispute in a film party in Bombay.

=== Moushumi Chatterjee's marriage ===
In the early 1970s, later actor Moushumi Chatterjee expressed eagerness for getting married. Both Mukherjee's son Jayanta Mukherjee and Kumar's son Gautam Chatterjee proposed marrying her. Chatterjee chose to marry Jayanta Mukherjee in 1972 and turned down the offer of Gautam Chatterjee, who along with Uttam Kumar saw her choice as a "defeat".

Chatterjee and Mukherjee went to Bombay in 1969 during Durga Puja festivals. During their trip, Mukherjee introduced Chatterjee to filmmaker Sashadhar Mukherjee. According to Chatterjee, Sashadhar Mukherjee's wife took an immediate liking to her and, wanted to bring her home and "actually make me her daughter-in-law", which did not happen. Chatterjee commented that (Hemanta) Mukherjee might have "taken the idea of Sashadhar Mukherjee's wife" as his own. Regarding her contact with Uttam Kumar and Gautam Chatterjee, she said that one day, actress Subrata Chattopadhyay came into her home and took her to the house of Kumar, where Gautam Chatterjee was also present among many other people. A while later, Kumar came into his house, where he asked whether Chatterjee liked Gautam and suggested that she marry his son, after which she left his house and went to her own home.

A few months later, Moushumi Chatterjee received a letter written by Gautam Chatterjee, about a "topic which everyone can figure out even if I do not speak about it myself". Chatterjee said that she did not reply to the letter, despite "everyone in their home wanting Gautam's marriage to be done with me". In 1972, she married Jayanta Mukherjee who she termed was "by the kindness of god".

== During dispute periods ==
After Mukherjee's and Kumar's altercations over the film Bees Saal Baad, Mukherjee temporarily stopped most of his singing for Kumar or his films. During the period, singers including Shyamal Mitra and Manna Dey began singing for Kumar, who lip-synced on their pre-recorded songs in the films. Their main collaborations with Kumar started after in the 1960s. Later, Kishore Kumar stepped in to playback for Kumar, with their best-known films being Rajkumari (1970) and Amanush (1974) and others.

Shyamal Mitra first acted in the 1953 film Sharey Chuattor and also sang a song titled "Amar Ei Jouban" in it, under insistence from Kumar. From Sharey Chuattor, their friendship formally began. One of Mitra's first and the biggest film projects as a singer and composer was the 1963 film Deya Neya, wherein Uttam Kumar acted, lip-syncing the songs performed by him. Written by Mazumder, Mitra sang four tracks in the film, namely "Jiban Khatar Prati Patay", "Gaane Bhuban Bhoriye Debe", "Ami Cheye Cheye Dekhi Saradin" and "Dole Dodul Dole Jhulana". After this film, Mitra frequently went to Kumar's house and attended his concerts.

Manna Dey frequently sang for Kumar. Dey's first major movie where he sang for Kumar is considered to be the 1966 film Sankhabela. Singer-songwriter Sudhin Dasgupta composed the songs for the picture, with lyrics given by Pulak Bandyopadhyay. Dasgupta wanted Dey to sing two songs that were planned to be filmed with Kumar lip-syncing. After several disputes of Dasgupta with the film producer and distributor, Dey was brought to sing the songs. Manna Dey and Kumar's most popular film was Antony Firingee (1967), with the two songs "Ami Je Jalsaghare" and "Ami Jamini Tumi Shashi He", written by Mazumder and composed by film score composer Anil Bagchi. Dey sang for Kumar in about more than 54 films, with their next famous film being 1972 Stree.

Mukherjee largely stopped singing and composing for Kumar during the time when Dey and Mitra became known singers for Kumar, but he continued to sing a very small volume of film songs which were picturized on Kumar, for example Kal Tumi Aleya.

== Bibliography ==
- Premchand, Manek (August 2020). The Unforgettable Music of Hemant Kumar. Foreword by Gulzar. New Delhi, 110065: Blue Pencil Publications. ISBN 978-81-939555-3-6.
- Gupta, Suman (2022). কিংবদন্তী সঙ্গীত সাধকের অন্তরঙ্গ জীবনকথা: হেমন্ত মুখোপাধ্যায় [An Intimate Biography of Legendary Musician: Hemanta Mukhopadhyay] (in Bengali). Kolkata, West Bengal: Deep Prakashan. ISBN 978-93-91168-37-7.
- Rajadhyaksha, Ashish; Willemen, Paul (1994). Encyclopedia of Indian Cinema. British Film Institute, London: Oxford University Press. p. 152. ISBN 0-85170-455-7.
- Chowdhury, Sayandeb (September 30, 2021). Uttam Kumar: A Life in Cinema. India: Bloomsbury Publishing. ISBN 978-93-90358-01-4.
- Chowdhury, Maitreyee B. (2013). Uttam Kumar and Suchitra Sen: Bengali Cinema's First Couple. India: Om Books International. ISBN 978-81-87108-56-6.
- Ray, Somshankar (July–September 2026). "Uttam Kumar: His Penmanship Was More Eloquent Than His Acting". E-CineIndia. Centenary Tribute: Uttam Kumar. XXXI. International Federation of Film Critics. ISSN 2582-2500.
