= Durga Durgatiharini =

Dawn radio programme of All India Radio

- Genre: Mythology
- Developed by: Dr. Dhyanesh Narayan Chakroborty
- Written by: Dr.Gobinda Gopal Mukhopadhyay, Madhuri Mukhopadhyay, Hemanta Mukhopadhyay
- Directed by: Hemanta Mukhopadhyay, Sailen Mukhopadhyay
- Voices of: Hemanta Mukhopadhyay, Lata Mangeshkar, Asha Bhosle, Manna Dey, Sandhya Mukhopadhyay, Aarti Mukhopadhyay, Manabendra Mukhopadhyay, Dwijen Mukhopadhyay, Utpala Sen, Pratima Bandopadhyay, Nirmala Mishra, Ashima Mukhopadhyay, Anup Ghoshal, Tarun Bandopadhyay, Sailen Mukherjee, Shipra Basu, Banashree Sengupta, Haimanti Sukla, Pintu Bhattacharya, Aparna Sengupta, Samaresh Roy, Arun Krishna Ghosh, Prabhas Prasun, Shakti Thakur
- Narrated by: Uttam Kumar, Sharmistha Sur, Chhanda Sen, Partha Ghosh
- Composers: Hemanta Mukhopadhyay, V. Balsara, Shyamal Gupta
- Country of origin: India
- Original languages: Bengali; Sanskrit

Production
- Production location: Kolkata
- Editor: Ashima Mukhopadhyay
- Running time: 60 minutes

Original release
- Network: All India Radio
- Release: 23 September 1976

Related
- Mahishasura Mardini

The program Deving Durgatiharinim was first aired by All India Radio on 23 September 1976 on the holy day of Mahalaya. It replaced the long running program Mahishasura Mardini narrated by Birendra Krishna Bhadra. It was dubbed as a "revamp", replacing Bhadra as the narrator by legendary Bengali film star Uttam Kumar, and Pankaj Mullick was replaced by Hemanta Mukherjee as the music director for the program.

The new program, however, was a huge flop, and was criticized a lot by the listeners. Such was the backlash that AIR decided to issue a public apology and continue broadcasting the one narrated by Bhadra on Mahalaya. The new program was there after scheduled to be aired every year on the day of Durga Mahasashthi (six days after Mahalaya).
