= Tasher Ghar =

1957 Bengali action drama film by Mangal Chakraborty

- Theatrical poster
- Directed by: Mangal Chakraborty
- Based on: The Scapegoat by Du Maurier
- Screenplay by: Mangal Chakraborty
- Story by: Rashbehari Lal
- Produced by: Govind Chand Burman
- Starring: Uttam Kumar; Sabitri Chatterjee; Chandrabati Devi; Tarun Kumar; Rabin Majumder
- Cinematography: Suhrid Ghosh
- Edited by: Biswanath Nayak
- Music by: Hemanta Mukherjee
- Production company: National Films
- Distributed by: Biswabharati Pictures
- Release date: 14 June 1957
- Country: India
- Language: Bengali

Tasher Ghar (Bengali pronunciation: [taser ɡʰor] transl. House of Cards) is a 1957 Indian Bengali-language action drama film co-written and directed by Mangal Chakraborty in his directorial debut. Produced by Govind Chand Burman under the banner of National Films, the film stars Uttam Kumar in dual roles, alongside Sabitri Chatterjee and Sabita Bose in lead roles, with Tarun Kumar, Chandrabati Devi, Rabin Majumder, and Jahar Ganguly in supporting roles.

Based on a story by Rashbehari Lal, which shows traces of influence from Daphne Du Maurier’s 1957 novel The Scapegoat. It depicts on a wealthy businessman, who decides to swap his monotonous life with his doppelganger, a poor teacher.

The film marks the first of the frequent collaborations between Chakraborty and Kumar. Music of the film is composed by Hemanta Mukherjee, with lyrics penned by Bimal Chandra Ghosh. Suhrid Ghosh handled its cinematography, while Biswanath Nayak edited the film. The film gained notable recognition for being Kumar's first appearance in dual roles.

Tasher Ghar was theatrically released on 14 June 1957, on the occasion of Ratha Yatra. The film emerged as a hit, opening to huge positive reviews. Generally attaining a cult status, the original print of the film is restored and digitised by the National Film Archive of India.

== Plot ==
Wealth became a curse for Ajay Mitra, a tycoon studied abroad. It eventually robs him of his will to live, when he takes the responsibility of his deceased father's business.

== Cast ==
- Uttam Kumar in dual roles
  - Ajay Mitra, an affluent person
  - Binay Dutta, a deprived person
- Sabitri Chatterjee as Ranu, Binay's sister
- Tarun Kumar as Ajay's manager
- Jahar Roy as Priyogopal
- Chandrabati Devi as Ajay's mother
- Jahar Ganguly as Shipra's father
- Sabita Bose as Shipra, Binay's love interest
- Rabin Majumder as Bilash, Ajay's friend
- Aparna Devi as Shipra's mother
- Tilak Chakraborty as Shipra's brother
- Bonny Ganguly
- Haren Mukherjee
- Devjani
- Roshan Kumari as dancer
- Lillian Charter as dancer

== Soundtrack ==
It marked Hemanta Mukherjee's sixth collaboration with Kumar, following Bou Thakuranir Haat (1953), Shap Mochan (1955), Chirakumar Sabha (1956), Trijama (1956), and Prithibi Amare Chaai (1957).

The soundtrack features four tracks, each with lyrics by Bimal Chandra Ghosh.

Track listing
No.	Title	Singer(s)	Length
1.	"Shunye Dana Mele"	Hemanta Mukherjee	1:47
2.	"Amar Gaane Sur Chhilo"	Pratima Banerjee	2:09
3.	"Nirobe Joto Kotha"	Alpana Banerjee, Rabin Majumder	3:14
4.	"Jwalinu Michhe Deep"	Rabin Majumder	3:09
Total length:			10:19

== Release ==
Tasher Ghar was theatrically released on 14 June 1957, on the occasion of Ratha Yatra. The film gained notable recognition for being Kumar's first appearance in dual roles, and emerged as a hit, receiving highly positive reviews upon release. It has been restored and digitised by the National Film Archive of India.

== Remakes and influences ==
In 1961, Adurthi Subba Rao remade the film into Telugu as Iddaru Mitrulu starring ANR. It also marked the debut of Sarada in Telugu cinema, in her first significant adult role. Later, was remade by T. R. Ramanna into Tamil as Ennai Pol Oruvan (1978) starring Sivaji Ganesan and also served as an inspiration for the 2017 Telugu film Goutham Nanda starring Gopichand.
