= Chandrabati Devi =

Indian actress

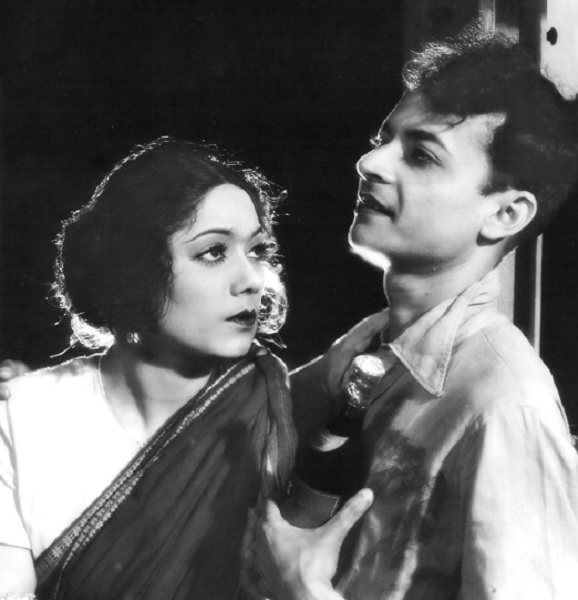
- Chandrabati Devi and Pramathesh Barua in Devdas (1935)
- Born: 19 October 1909; Bihar, India
- Died: 29 April 1992 (aged 82); Kolkata, India
- Occupation: Actress
- Known for: Pujarin (1936); Agni Pareeksha (1954); Raja-Saja (1960)
- Spouse: Bimal Pal

Chandrabati Devi was an Indian actress who worked in Hindi and Bengali cinema. Born on 19 October 1909 in Muzaffarpur, she later moved to Kolkata, where she graduated in Bengali literature and trained in music under Dinendranath Tagore. She entered the silent film industry with the help of her husband, Bimal Pal, with whom she founded 'Movie Pictures', making her debut in the silent film Piyari (1929). Despite challenges, she earned acclaim for roles like Meera in Debaki Bose's cult classic Meerabai (1933), as Chandramukhi in the 1935 cult classic Devdas, and "Dakshayagna", with her portrayal of Saratchandra Chattopadhyay's heroines leaving a lasting impact.

As her career progressed, she transitioned to character roles, with memorable performances in "Agni Pariksha" and "Ami Sirajer Begum".

Devi died on 29 April 1992 at the age of 82.

== Filmography ==
- Ami Ratan (1979)
- Praner Thakur Ramkrishna (1977) as Bhairabi Maa
- Rodanbhara Basanta (1974)
- Kayahiner Kahini (1973)
- Agnibhramar (1973)
- Ami Sirajer Begam (1973)
- Bigyan O Bidhata (1973)
- Chhinnapatra (1972)
- Naya Michhil (1972)
- Jiban Jigyasa (1971)
- Atattar Din Pare (1971)
- Fariyad (1971)
- Rajkanya (1965)
- Kantatar (1964)
- Sakher Chor (1960)
- Raja Saja (1960)
- Indradhanu (1960)
- Bicharak (1959)
- Marutirtha Hinglaj (1959) as Jogini Maa
- Deep Jwele Jai (1959)
- E Jahar Se Jahar Noy (1959)
- Raater Andhakare (1959)
- Sashibabur Sansar (1959)
- Indrani (1958)
- Parash Pathar (1958) as herself(guest appearance)
- Lilakanka (1958)
- Marmabani (1958)
- Jiban Trishna (1957)
- Pathe Holo Deri (1957)
- Chandranath (1957)
- Harano Sur (1957)
- Tasher Ghar (1957)
- Prithibi Amare Chaay (1957)
- Abhishek (1957)
- Madhabir Janya (1957)
- Panchatapa (1957)
- Srimatir Sansar (1957)
- Tamasa (1957)
- Tapasi (1957)
- Putrabadhu (1956)
- Trijama (1956)
- Ekti Raat (1956)
- Laksha Heera (1956)
- Dui Purush (1945)
- Priyo Bandhobi (1943)
- Protishruti (1941)- as Sumitra, a society woman
- Shuktara (1940)
- Devdas (1935) -as Chandramukhi
- Meerabai (1933)-as Meera

== Books ==
Chandrabati Devi has written about her life as an actress in a memoir. Her memoir is titled 'Chandrabati Devi Bolchi'. She also wrote a short memoir titled 'My Life as an Actress'.
