= Aaj Dujanar Duti Path =

1957 song by Hemanta Mukherjee

Song by Hemanta Mukhopadhyay

from the album Harano Sur
- Language: Bengali
- English title: Today both our paths have separated into two
- Released: September 6, 1957
- Length: 3:22
- Label: Saregama
- Composer: Hemanta Mukhopadhyay
- Lyricist: Gauriprasanna Mazumdar
- Producer: Uttam Kumar

Lyrical video
- "Aaj Dujanar Duti Path" on YouTube

"Aaj Dujanar Duti Path" (আজ দুজনার দুটি পথ/ওগো, দুটি দিকে গেছে বেঁকে) is a Bengali song by Indian playback singer Hemanta Mukhopadhyay (Mukherjee), written by lyricist Gauriprasanna Mazumdar and composed by Hemanta Mukherjee under the record label of Saregama. The song was released on September 6, 1957 as part of the film Harano Sur directed by Ajoy Kar. It was produced by Uttam Kumar with his associated production company Alochhaya Production Pvt. Ltd. The song along with "Tumi Je Amar" from the same film became one of the most popular Bengali songs.

The song sung by Hemanta Mukherjee is themed on the loss of love in life (heartbreak) that is felt by most people vicariously. The Daily Star writes that the searing pain which is described in "Aaj Dujanar Duti Path" is rare in songs nowadays.

"Aaj Dujanar Duti Path" is picturized on actor Uttam Kumar in its film Harano Sur signifying separation of the characters. Although the song was played in the background instead of the traditional lip-syncing that Uttam Kumar later followed in his songs, Mukherjee sang it in a way which suggested that Kumar was singing it himself.

== Composition and reception ==
"Aaj Dujanar Duti Path"
Full song from Harano Sur.

According to Gauriprasanna Mazumdar, it took Hemanta Mukherjee about 15 minutes to compose the music for both songs in Harano Sur, namely "Tumi Je Amar" and "Aaj Dujanar Duti Path". He commented that Mukherjee believed a song's melody was not measured in minutes, hours or days. Basab Chatterjee commented that there are some song melodies that are not achieved by working on for multiple days; but Mukherjee's music put to both songs touched people's hearts. The song was generally successful with its release.

Harano Sur is regarded as one of Mukherjee's most successful assignments as a music director after he put music to his previous film Shap Mochan (1955). The film had only two songs. "Tumi Je Amar" sung by Geeta Dutt was used twice in the film, which Dutt sang both with a slightly varied tone. According to historian Manek Premchand, Mukherjee could not dedicate more than 45 minutes for setting the music for both songs. Mukherjee's music was criticized for being made-in-haste and not being "careful enough". The filmmakers of Harano Sur suggested using a Rabindra Sangeet instead of keeping "Tumi Je Amar" for "not being good enough". Mukherjee, however, remained firm in his decision to have both songs be featured in the film and also have Dutt sing the song. The filmmakers later agreed to put both the songs in the film with their original composition and singers intact. With Harano Sur's release on September 6, 1957, "Aaj Dujanar Duti Path" and "Tumi Je Amar" became massive hit songs of Bengali which also affected the popularity of the film itself. Mukherjee later went on to sing more songs that were lip-synced by Uttam Kumar in the films he acted.

Pradosh Bhattacharya in his article writes about "Aaj Dujanar Duti Path" that although the composition and lyrics are entirely original, it reminds him feelings and emotions of the song "Amar E Path Tomar Pather Theke". He remarks that when he heard it for the first time in the theater complex Rabindra Sadan in 1973 in the presence of the artist, it reminded him of a poem of Nazrul.

A correspondent from ETV Bharat writes that in 1957, Uttam–Suchitra's sensational film Harano Sur was released, directed by Ajoy Kar. Hemanta Mukherjee was given the role of composing the two songs of the film which were written by Gauriprasanna Mazumdar. The correspondent writes that while "Tumi Je Amar" sung by Geeta Dutt enchanted the audience, "Aaj Dujanar Duti Path" sung by Hemanta overwhelmed the heart of the listeners. It is an example of Hemanta Mukherjee singing in Uttam Kumar's films.
