= Harano Sur =

1957 Bengali film by Ajoy Kar

- Theatrical release poster
- Directed by: Ajoy Kar
- Screenplay by: Nripendrakrishna Chatterjee
- Based on: Random Harvest (1942 American film)
- Produced by: Uttam Kumar
- Starring: Suchitra Sen; Uttam Kumar; Utpal Dutt; Pahari Sanyal
- Cinematography: Ajoy Kar
- Edited by: Ardhendu Chatterjee
- Music by: Hemanta Mukherjee
- Production company: Alo Chaya Productions
- Distributed by: Chayabani Pvt Ltd
- Release date: 6 September 1957
- Running time: 162 minutes
- Country: India
- Language: Bengali

Harano Sur (Bengali pronunciation: [harano sur]; transl. The Lost Tune) is a 1957 Indian Bengali-language psychological romantic drama film directed by Ajoy Kar. Produced by Uttam Kumar under his home-banner of Alo Chhaya Productions, the film is an adaptation of the 1942 American film Random Harvest, which itself is based on James Hilton's eponymous novel. It stars Kumar himself alongside Suchitra Sen, with a supporting cast including Pahari Sanyal, Utpal Dutt, Chandrabati Devi and Kajari Guha. It plots an amnesiac businessman who forgets his wife after an accident.

Written by Nripendrakrishna Chatterjee, the film had music by Hemanta Mukherjee, sung by Geeta Dutt. This is the first film that Uttam produced along with Ajoy Kar. The film is regarded as one of the finest examples of Bengali cinema of this early period. The film is based on. The film became the highest grossing Bengali film of 1957. The songs "Tumi Je Amar" and "Aaj Dujanar Duti Path" written by Gauriprasanna Mazumder and composed by Hemanta Mukherjee became major hits.

== Synopsis ==
An amnesiac after a train accident, Alok Mukherjee (Uttam Kumar) is rescued after escaping from the asylum where he was admitted by Doctor Roma Banerjee (Suchitra Sen) who takes him to her father's (Pahadi Sanyal) country house in a village called Palaspur. There, while treating him, she falls for him and he for her. They marry but a second accident makes him recall his life as a rich businessman in Calcutta and forget the memories spent with Roma. Roma follows him to Calcutta and meets him there, but he doesn't recognise her. He hires her as governess to his niece instead. Roma keeps trying to simulate Alok's memory but is looked at suspiciously by Lata, Alok's fiancée in Calcutta who thinks Roma is snatching Alok away from her and who complains to Alok's mother. The latter has Roma kicked out. Alok, realizing she is from Palaspur and that is where he got back his memory goes there and regains his memory of times spent with Roma there.

== Cast ==
- Uttam Kumar as Alok Mukherjee
- Suchitra Sen as Dr. Roma Banerjee
- Pahadi Sanyal as Roma's father
- Chandrabati Devi as Alok's mother
- Utpal Dutta as Dr Majumder
- Khagen Pathak as Station Master
- Shailen Mukherjee as Manager
- Haren Mukherjee as Dr. Haren Mukherjee
- Dipak Mukherjee as Mihir Bhattacharya
- Kajori Guha as Lata

== Soundtrack ==
Harano Sur

Soundtrack album by Hemanta Mukherjee
- Released: 1957
- Studio: Alo Chaya Productions Pvt Ltd
- Genre: Feature Film Soundtrack
- Length: 0:06:44
- Label: Saregama
- Producer: Uttam Kumar

Hemanta Mukherjee chronology
Tasher Ghar (1957)	Harano Sur (1957)	Lukochuri (1958)

Hemanta Mukherjee composed the music of the film. All the lyrics were penned by Gauriprasanna Mazumder.

Songs
No.	Title	Playback	Length
1.	"Tumi Je Amar"	Geeta Dutt	3:08
2.	"Aaj Dujanar Duti Path"	Hemanta Mukherjee	3:32
Total length:			6:40

== Production ==
Harano Sur was the first film produced by Uttam Kumar along with Ajoy Kar. Uttam decided to keep Bengali cinema to national level, so he came into film production under their banner Alochaya Production Pvt Ltd. The film was based on 1942 Oscar nominated film Random Harvest which itself based on the novel of same name written by James Hilton.

== Release & Reception ==
It was released in India on 6 September 1957 under the banner of Alochaya Production and distributed by Chayabani Private Limited.

=== Reviews ===
The Times of India wrote The legendary Suchitra Sen and Uttam Kumar – that’s what this movie is all about. It’s simply their charisma, their chemistry, their presence which will captivate you throughout.

=== Box office ===
The film became highest grossing Bengali film in 1957.

== Themes ==
Random Harvest had already been adapted before in Tamil in 1956 as Amara Deepam and starred Sivaji Ganeshan and Savitri, which was later remade in Hindi as Amar Deep starring Dev Anand and Vyjainthimala.

== Awards ==
- 1957 – Certificate of Merit for Third Best Feature Film in Bengali
