= Bon Palashir Padabali =

1973 Bengali film

- Directed by: Uttam Kumar
- Written by: Romapada Chowdury
- Screenplay by: Uttam Kumar (dialogue), Joydeb Basu (Additional dialogues)
- Based on: Bon Polashir Padaboli by Romapada Chowdhury
- Produced by: Uttam Kumar
- Starring: Uttam Kumar; Supriya Devi; Madhavi Mukherjee; Bikash Roy
- Cinematography: Kanai Dey; Madhu Bhattacharya
- Edited by: Kamal Ganguly
- Music by: Rabindranath Tagore, Shyamal Mitra, Nachiketa Ghosh, Adhir Bagchi, Satinath Mukherjee
- Production company: Shilpi Sangshad
- Distributed by: Shree Ranjit Pictures Pvt Ltd
- Release date: 9 February 1973
- Running time: 141 min
- Country: India
- Language: Bengali

Bon Palashir Padabali is a 1973 Indian Bengali language romantic action drama film co-written and directed by Uttam Kumar. It is an adaptation of a 1960 same name novel by Ramapada Chowdhury. The film was released on 9 February 1973, under the banner of Uttam foundation Shilpi Sangsad.

== Plot ==
Girijaprasad Roy was a good student who secured first Division in the final exam. He was fond of Chhotoma whose husband was Bibhuti, the very first scholar of the village before Girija. Bibhuti changed his religion to Christianity so Chhotoma refused to go with him to City after death of Bibhuti's elder brother, Kalidas, who was a religious person and a critic of Bibhuti's religious transformation. Besides, Girija left his village for higher studies and came back after a long time. All of his villagers believed him to be rich. After a few days, everyone learned of his poor financial condition. His only daughter Bimala was attracted to Block Development Officer Pravakar. As Girijaprasad was not rich, everybody tried to neglect him and helped his only brother Girin who stayed in the same village. Girin was a wealthy and clever man. He deprived his elder brother and tried to make relation with Pravakar. But in the end, Girija's daughter Bimala was married to Pravakar instead of Girin's daughter Tia in the intervention of Girin's wife. On the other hand, Udas Kotal a soft-hearted, honest man wanted to learn driving for a better life. He married Laxmimoni to learn driving from his father-in-law. Laxmimoni's father taught him driving and made him an expert driver. Unfortunately, Laxmimoni had some psychological problem and as a result, she killed herself. Udas became very upset and after few days, he wanted to get married his childhood friend Padma but Padma refused to get married. Day by day Udas became an alcoholic, characterless bohemian kind of person. One day after a quarrel, he hears baseless and incorrect news that Padma was having an affair with the doctor, he goes to murder the doctor with a knife. In the darkness, drunken Udas killed his old mate Padma. As a result, he was convicted and sentenced to death. Doctor left the village.

== Cast ==
- Uttam Kumar as Udas
- Supriya Devi as Padma
- Nirmal Kumar
- Madhabi Mukherjee
- Bikash Roy as Girija Prasada
- Anil Chatterjee as Doctor
- Jahor Roy
- Molina Devi as Atta maa
- Basabi Nandi

== Production ==
This is the second film directed by Uttam Kumar after Shudhu Ekti Bachhar in 1966 under his own association Shilpi Sangshad. It is a foundation which was founded by Uttam Kumar in 1968 to help poor artists and technicians. He always arranged function and concert to collect money for the fund. But that kind of money didn't gather. So he decided to make a big canvas film. Uttam wanted to fulfil the fund from film profits. For his request every top artists and Uttam himself worked without any fees. Uttam also did screenplay and background music.

== Soundtrack ==
Bon Polashir Padaboli

Soundtrack album by Rabindranath Tagore, Shyamal Mitra, Adhir Bagchi, Satinath Mukherjee
- Released: 1973
- Recorded: 1972
- Studio: Shilpi Sangshad
- Genre: Feature film soundtrack
- Length: 0:38:36
- Label: Angel Digital Pvt Ltd
- Producer: Uttam Kumar

All lyrics are written by Rabindranath Tagore, Gauriprasanna Mazumder; all music is composed by Rabindranath Tagore, Shyamal Mitra, Adhir Bagchi, Satinath Mukherjee Most of the songs become popular.

Songs
| No. | Title | Playback | Length |
|---|---|---|---|
| 1. | "Dekhuk Para Porshite" | Shyamal Mitra | 2:49 |
| 2. | "Aaha Aaha Mori Mori" | Shyamal Mitra, | 2:31 |
| 3. | "E Je Noy Phoolsajye" | | 3:15 |
| 4. | "Bhola Mon Moner Kotha" | Shyamal Mitra | 3:36 |
| 5. | "O Bhaber Nagari" | Manna Dey, Swapna Dasgupta | 6:52 |
| 6. | "Amar E Path" | Dwijen Mukherjee | 2:40 |
| 7. | "Bahudin Pare Bhramar Eseche" | Utpala Sen | 3:14 |
| 8. | "Amar Monta Tane" | Shyamal Mitra | 2:57 |
| 9. | "Ei To Bhaber Khela" | Satinath Mukherjee | 2:57 |
| 10. | "O Tor Nijer Sukher Tare" | Adhir Bagchi | 2:20 |
| 11. | "Biye Kore Anbo Ebar" | Adhir Bagchi | 2:51 |
| 12. | "Dhin Kete Dhin Dhin Ta" | Shyamal Mitra | 3:01 |
| Total length: | | | 38:36 |

== Reception ==
Uttam Kumar’s massive melodrama about passion, violence and politics in the small village of Bon Palashi. The film is narrated through two sets of characters whose stories are intercut and eventually merged. Plans to develop the village loom large in the melodrama but the film impresses mainly through its scale (the title means The Songs of Bon Palashi) and its recourse to several acting idioms, including folk theatre.

Uttam's direction was huge praised by the critics. Hindustan Standard wrote that time 'In Uttam Kumar we have found a director who shows his brilliance on diverse levels. That is main again in Bon Pilashir Padabali, whose 20,000 and odd feer are studded with sparklis of present achievement and future promise.' The film became a blockbuster hit at the box office and a golden jubilee hit.

== Awards ==
BFJA Awards 1974

- 1974: BFJA Award for Best Supporting Actress - Basabi Nandi
- 1974: BFJA Award for Best Lyricist - Gouri Prassanno Majumder
- 1974: BFJA Award for Best Male Playback Singer - Dwijen Mukheejee
