= Neer Choto Khoti Nei =

1958 song by Hemanta Mukherjee and Geeta Dutt

"Neer Chhoto Kshati Nei"

Single by Hemanta Mukhopadhyay and Geeta Dutt

from the album Indrani
- Language: Bengali
- English title: No harm with the nest being small, the sky is big
- Released: 10 October 1958
- Studio: Bombay
- Length: 3:19
- Label: Saregama; Angel Digital
- Composer: Nachiketa Ghosh
- Lyricist: Gauriprasanna Mazumder
- Producer: Laxmikant–Pyarelal

Lyrical video
- "Neer Chhoto Kshati Nei" on YouTube

"Neer Choto Khoti Nei" (Bengali: নীড় ছোট ক্ষতি নেই) is a Bengali-language song recorded as a duet between Hemanta Mukherjee and Geeta Dutt, Indian playback singers. Featured in the 1958 film Indrani, it was written by Gauriprasanna Mazumdar, composed by Nachiketa Ghosh, arranged by Laxmikant–Pyarelal and labeled under the record label of Saregama with the release on October 10, 1958. It is regarded as a classic example where the actor Uttam Kumar lip-syncs to a song recorded off-screen by singer Hemanta Mukherjee. And is among the earliest and most popular songs which are written by Mazumdar and composed by Ghosh.

== Recording, themes and performances ==
The film Indrani was directed by Niren Lahiri, and was released on October 10, 1958, along with its songs. All songs of the film were penned by lyricist Gauriprasanna Mazumdar and composed by Nachiketa Ghosh, besides a few music parts which were inputted by Mukherjee. "Neer Choto Khoti Nei" was sung as a duet performed by Mukherjee and Dutt. It, along with other songs of the film were recorded in a recording studio in the city of Bombay (Mumbai).

In the film, the "Neer Choto Khoti Nei" is lip-synced jointly by actors Uttam Kumar (the parts sung by Mukherjee) and Suchitra Sen (the parts sung by Dutt), designated to be a love song. The arrangement of the song was done by the composer duo Laxmikant–Pyarelal, who oversaw the music project. It became a hit song and was the first defining single of duets performed by Mukherjee and Dutt. At the day of the recording, actor Raj Kapoor was also present inside the building.

Pallavi Ghosh from Aajkaal writes that "Neer Choto Khoti Nei" from Indrani is probably the last lyrics of romanticism desired by several generations of Bengalis. It is one of the most popular songs written by Gauriprasanna Mazumdar, composed by Nachiketa Ghosh and sung by Hemanta Mukherjee, who were often called a music trio. It gained prominence in the film music for the appearances of Uttam Kumar and Sen on screen. Ghosh describes that the scenes featuring the song depict Kumar wearing a shirt over a dhoti with messy hair on his head. Mainak Biswas in an article of Anandabazar describes the song and the film scenes as examples of romanticism, in which the film shots portrayed "individuals' loneliness against the backdrop of horizon", which was a significant and popular part of Indrani. Biswas remarks that the song represents two individuals, played by Kumar and Sen, who get out from the confines of a large family or social group to find a private space for love, a gesture of romanticism shown by it.

From 1965, Geeta Dutt performed at functions and concerts for collecting money for her children, after her husband Guru Dutt died. During one of her music events with Hemanta Mukherjee, Dutt came to the stage intoxicated, and after some time she fell asleep with her head on a harmonium. Afterwards, Mukherjee sang "Neer Choto Khoti Nei" by himself solo in front of the audience instead of the duet they were originally supposed to perform together.

== Reception ==
The newspaper The Times of India wrote about the song: "A soulful composition reflecting the need and desires of love, 'Neer Chhoto Khoti Nei' was jointly composed by Nachiketa Ghosh and Hemanta Mukhopadhyay. Gauri Prasanna Majumder's lyrics in this song beautifully narrate the importance of openness of heart."
