= Pratima Bandopadhyay =

Srimati Pratima Bandopadhyay
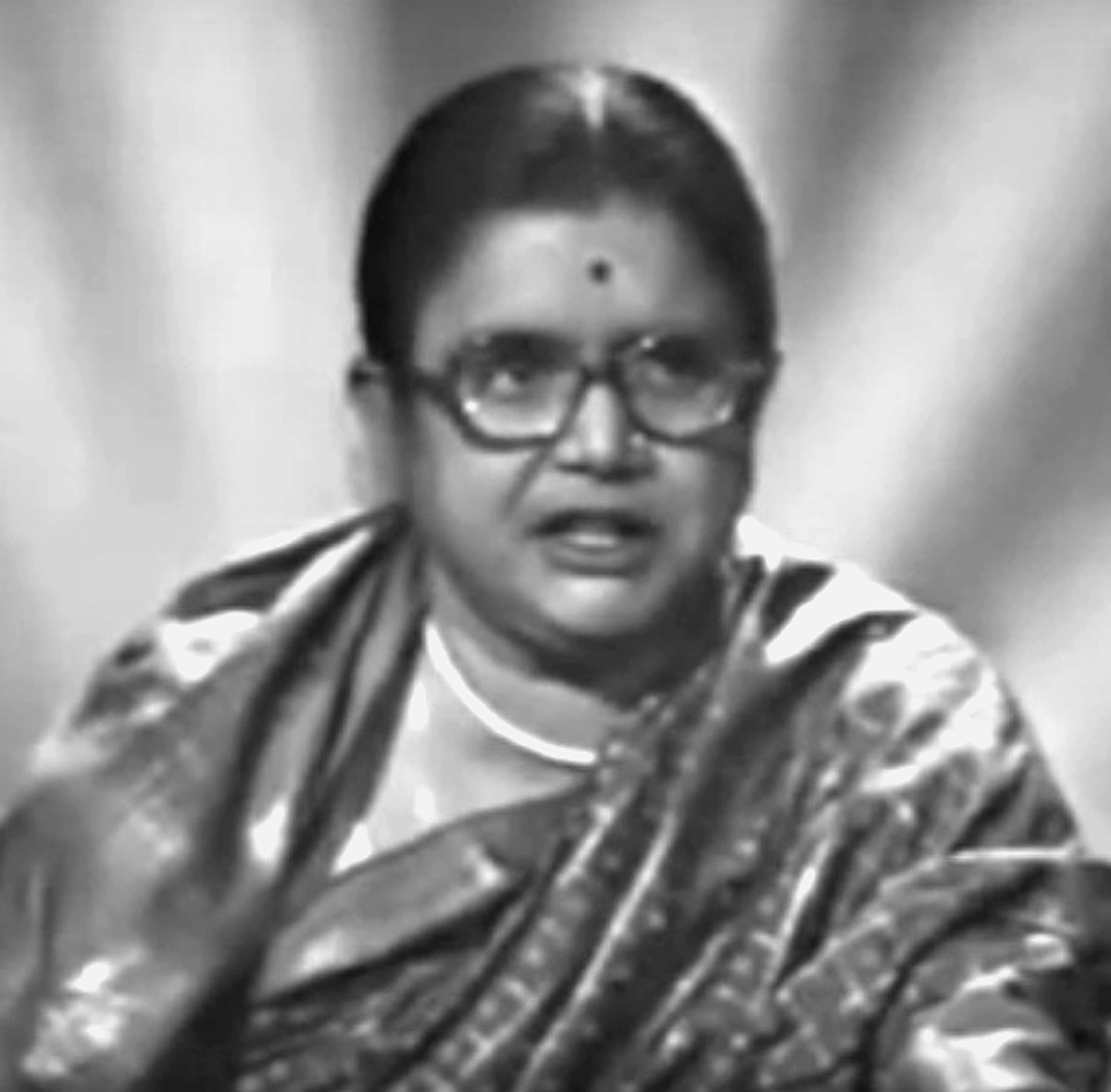
- শ্রীমতী প্রতিমা বন্দ্যোপাধ্যায়

Background information
- Born: Pratima Chattopadhyay; 21 December 1934; Calcutta, Bengal Presidency, British India
- Died: 29 July 2004 (aged 69) Kolkata, West Bengal, India
- Genres: Playback singer
- Occupation: Singer

Pratima Bandopadhyay (Bengali: প্রতিমা বন্দ্যোপাধ্যায়; 21 December 1934 – 29 July 2004; born as Pratima Chatterjee aka Pratima Chattopadhyay) was a Bengali playback singer from Kolkata, who sang numerous songs in popular Bengali language movies and non-film as well, particularly during the 1940s, 50s, 60s and 70s. She was also known as Pratima Banerjee.

== Early life ==
Pratima Bandopadhyay's ancestors came from Baherak (Bengali: বাহেরক), Bikrampur (now Munshiganj), Dhaka, Bangladesh. She lost her father Mani Bhushan Chattopadhyay at the age of one. Her mother Kamala Chattopadhyay raised her in their house at Bhabanipur, Kolkata. She started taking lessons in music at a very early age from Sri Prakash Kali Ghoshal.

== Career ==
Pratima Bandyopadhyay's first record appeared in 1945 through Senola Records. In famous radio programme of Akashvani the song "Amala Kirane" was introduced in the late 40s, another song a duet with Dwijen Mukhopadhyay "He Charupurno Somoshikhorini" was introduced in the year 1952 which increased her popularity. She made her debut in playback singing in Bengali films in 1951 when she recorded "Totini ami, Tumi sudurer chand" under the music direction of Shri Sudhirlal Chakraborty in film "Sunandar Biye". Over three decades, she lent her voice to more than 65 Bengali movies and numerous non-film songs.

== Death and legacy ==
After the death of Pratima's husband Shri Amiyo Kumar Bandyopadhyay in 1986, her health deteriorated rapidly, and on 29 July 2004 she died. She was survived by her daughter Raikishori Bandyopadhyay and son Amarnath Bandyopadhyay and family.

== Memoirs ==
- Pulak Bandyopadhyay, the famous and noted lyricist of Bengal of the yesteryear, mentioned in his memoir: "When the song 'Ke prothom kachhe esechhi', written by me and sung by Manna Dey and Lata Mangeshkar, became popular, I received a call from a mysterious fan, praising the lyrics. She did not reveal her name. Since then I used to receive call from her whenever a song written by me became a sensation. At last one day she agreed to come to meet me at certain location in Elgin road at 5 o'clock in the afternoon. I was overwhelmed. The time was approaching, and cleaned my car and got dressed. Then the phone rang. It was Hemanta Mukherjee. He insisted that I should visit his house for creation of Puja songs at 5 o'clock. Pratima Bandopadhyay would be there waiting. All my persuasion to change the date failed. While driving my car towards Hemanta-da's house, the clock was approaching 5, I was thinking about the mysterious lady, and first two lines came in to my mind, 'Baro saadh jaage, ekbar tomay dekhi' (I wanna see you just for once). Never heard of the lady ever after. Pratima recorded the song."
- Nirmala Mishra recalled: "One night at about 12 o'clock I received a phone call. It was a great surprise for me, because the caller was none other than the famous artist Pratima Bandopadhyay. She told, 'Nirmala, Manab Babu had given us a song. Let us practice it here.' Regularly Pratima Bandopadhyay used to call me after mid night for practice." The song was: Abire Rangalo Ke Amay of the film Mukhujjye Paribar (1956).

== Discography ==
Pratima Bandyopadhyay Discography
Year	Song	Film/album	Lyrics	Music	Code
-	Amala Kirane Tribhubana Manoharini	Album: Mahishasura Mardini – An Oratorio invoking the Goddess Durga	Bani Kumar	Pankaj Kumar Mallik	
-	He Charupurno samashikhorini	Album: Mahishasura Mardini – An Oratorio invoking the Goddess Durga	Bani Kumar	Pankaj Kumar Mallik	
-	Shanti dile bhori up to 1962 then the song was sung by Utpala Sen	Album: Mahishasura Mardini – An Oratorio invoking the Goddess Durga	Bani Kumar	Pankaj Kumar Mallik	
-	Antorjami Tumi Toh	Shothe Shathyong			
1965	Aabire Rangalo Key Amay (duet with Nirmala Mishra)	Mukhujjye Paribar	Shyamal Gupta	Manabendra Mukherjee	
1950	Aaja Ab Toh Aja (Not used in the Film)	Anarkali	Rajinder Krisnan	C. Ramachandra	
1960	Aaji Murli Baaje	Goriber Meye		Hemanta Mukherjee	
1959	Aajo Jege Achhi	Puja Album	Prabir Majumdar	Prabir Majumdar	
1959	Aakash Mor Aloye Diyechho Bhore	Lalu Bhulu		Rabin Chattopadhay	
1966	Aakashe Chander Alo	Rajodrohi		Ali Akbar Khan	
1965	Aakashe Jaage Kato Je Alo		Arun Chattopadhyay	Lakshmikant Pyarelal	
	Aalo Ki Sona Sona	AIR Ramyageeti	Kabita Singha	Kalipada Sen	
1972	Aalor Thikana Tumi	Shapath Nilam		Sukumar Mitra	
1971	Aamar Bakul Phul Koi		Gouriprasanna Majumder	Shyamal Mitra	
1980	Aamar Duchokh Keno		Mohini Choudhury	Ratu Mukhopadhyay	
	Aamar Duchokhe Ghum Nei				
1957	Aamar Gaane Sur Chhilo	Taser Ghar	Bimal Chandra Ghosh	Hemanta Mukherjee	
1967	Aamar Haat Dhore Tumi (remake from Angurbala's song)	Chhuti	Dhiren Chatterjee	Bhutnath Das	
1960	Aamar Jemon Beni Temni Rabe	Natun Fashal		Ustad Vilayet Khan (m. dir. Rai Chand Boral)	
1967	Aamar Jiban Nadir Opaare	Chhuti	Atul Prasad Sen	Atul Prasad Sen	
	Aamar Mon Radhikar Mon Chhilo Je		Pulak Bandyopadhyay	Robin Chattopadhyay	
	Aamar Mone Ichha Achhe	AIR Shyama Sangeet	Kamalakanto	Unknown	
	Aamar Moner Manusher Sone		Lalan Fakir	Lalan Fakir	akl0ltMdB78
1962	Aamar Prabhat Madhur Holo (duet with Hemanta Mukherjee)	Mayar Sansar		Rabin Chatterjee	
1953	Aamar Sona ChNader Kona	Laljhuti Kakatua	Pranab Ray	Husnlal Bhagatram	
	Aamay Diyona Tumi Kshnik Biram	AIR Deshbandana	Pranab Ray	Husnlal Bhagatram	
1955	Aami Anek Cheyeo Parini Bhulite				
	Aami Bondhur Premagune Pora	Folk		Nirmalendu Chowdhury	
1974	Ami Ekela Cholechhi Ei Bhobe	Bisarjan	Rabindranath Tagore	Rabindranath Tagore	
	Ami Gaaner Majhe Benche Thakbo				
	Aami Jege Thaki Ar Raat Je Ghumay		Ratan Saha	Buddhdeb Gangopadhyay	
	Aami Keno Ailam (chorus with Sumitra Sen)	Folk – Dhamail			
1957	Aami Kuheli Naa Swapna	Harano Sur		Hemanta Mukherjee	
	Aami Mela Theke Taalpatar			Mrinal Bandopadhyay	
	Aami Mon Haralam Taar Kajol Chokhe				
1955	Aami Nishither Maya	Aparadhi	Pranab Roy	Gopen Mallick	reUhEdIMCOc
	Ami Priya Habo Chhilo Sadh		Pulak Bandyopadhyay	Rabin Chattopadhay	
	Aamtalay Jhamur Jhumur (chorus with Sumitra Sen)	Folk			UNf9G2p4CUI
1981	Aandhar Aamar Bhalo Lage		Mukul Datta	Hemanta Mukherjee	
1969	Aankhi Bale Chalo	Sabarmati	Gouri Prasanna Majumdar	Gopen Mullick	
	Aar Amare Maris Ne Maa		Lalan Fakir	Lalan Fakir	
1974	Aar Kato Kal Thakbo Bose Duar Khule	Jadhubangsha	Atul Prasad Sen	Atul Prasad Sen	
1964	Aar Toh Parina Saheli	Album Puja	Miltu Ghosh	Anal Chattopadhyay	
	Aay Ke Jabi Opare		Lalan Fakir	Lalan Fakir	
1966	Ato Bhalo Basi Tabu Keno Elona (duet with Dhananjay Bhattacharya)	Angeekar		V Balsara	OvtNutmhjx8
1954	Babul Mora	Jodu Bhatta		Wajid Ali Shah	(m. dir. Jnan Prakash Ghosh)
	Bajay Na Banshi Omon Kore	AIR Ramyageeti	Shantimoy Karforma	Unknown	
	Bandhu Samay Jano Na	Folk	Lalan Fakir	Nirmalendu Chowdhury	
1955	Bansh Baganer Mathar Opor		Jatindra Mohan Bagchi	Sudhin Dasgupta	
1968	Banshori Go Bajo Tumi		Shyamal Gupta	Alok De	
1970	Baro Sadh Jage Ekbar Tomay Dekhi		Pulak Bandyopadhyay	Hemanta Mukherjee	
1962	Bawri Bhayi Piya	Bandhan	Gouriprasanna Majumdar	Rajen Sarkar	
	Bhalobasa Asbe Bole		Pulak Bandyopadhyay	Manna De	
1968	Bhalobaso Tumi Gaan Shunte		Shyamal Gupta	Alok De	
1956	Bhor Holo Dor Kholo		Anal Chattopadhyay	Shyamal Mitra	
1957	Bhramara Gun Gun Gunjariya Aase		Abhijit Banerjee	Abhijit Banerjee	
1976	Bhuli Kamone Ajo Je Mone (duet with Manna De)	Asamay		Kazi Najrul Islam	
1966	Boner Chameli Phire Aay (remake from Shailo Devi's song – 1940)		Sailen Roy	Himangshu Datta	
1963	Bisher Baanshi Ke Bajay Re		Pulak Bandyopadhyay	Rotu Mukhopadhyay	
	Chal Tusu Chal Khelte Jabo (chorus with Nilima Banerjee)	Folk			
1955	Chand Dube Gele	Hrod	Shyamal Gupta	Manabendra Mukhopadhyay	
1958	Chand Bhabe Jyotsna Dhelechhe			Nachiketa Ghosh	
	Cheyona Mochhate Cheyona		Pulak Bandyopadhyay	Hemanta Mukherjee	
	Chhalke Pare Kalke Phule				
1955	Chhilo Sur Chhilo Gaan	Aparadhi	Pranab Roy	Gopen Mallick	tQGdDzDC9Ig
1959	Chholke Pare Kolke Phule	Ek Gochha Rajanigandha	Probodh Ghosh	Anal Chatterjee	
	Chhotto Ekta Pakhi Kine	AIR Ramyageeti	Babu Guha Thakurta	V Balsara	
1960	Chinbi Kemone (with Nirmalendu Choudhury)	Natun Fashal		Rai Chand Boral	
	Chirodin Ami Je Tomay				
1954	Chupi Chupi Elo Ke (duet with Prasun Bandyopadhyay)	Dhuli		Rajen Sarkar	
1976	Dakhin Samiran Sathe	Asamay	Kazi Nazrul Islam	Kazi Nazrul Islam	
	Daras Bin Dukhaan Laage Nayan	Meera Bhajans			
1964	Dekha Dao Dekha Dao	Kasti Pathar		Manabendra Mukhopadhyay	
1955	Din Jay kshon Jay	Atmo Darshan	Pabitra Chattopadhyay	Pabitra Chattopadhyay	0mE6OofCnXk
	Dole Dole Oi				
	Du Chokhe Brishitike Dhorechhi				
	Dure Oi Piyal Shakhay	AIR Ramyageeti	Shyamal Gupta	Aloknath De	
	Durgam Giri Kantar Moru			Kazi Najrul	
	E Baro Ajab Kudrati	Folk	Lalan Fakir	Lalan Fakir (m. comp. Dinendra Chowdhury)	
	E Dal Bhangile BNadhu		Ajay Bhattacharya	Ashok Roy	
	E Ki Sei Tumi		Subir Hajra	Prashanta Bhattacharya	
1955	E Pare Ganga O Pare Ganga		Bhaskar Basu	Sudhin Dasgupta	
	E Shudhu Bhuler Bojha		Gouriprasanna Majumdar	Shyamal Mitra	
1968	Ei Kathati Mone Rekho	Chowranghee	Rabindranath Tagore	Rabindranath Tagore	
1967	Ei Lobhinu Sanga Tabo (Duet with Chinmoy Chattopadhyay)	Chhuti	Rabindranath Tagore	Rabindranath Tagore	
1966	Ei Mon Rajhangsi	Ek Saathe	Ranjit Dey	Mrinal Banerjee	
	Ei Sur Jhara Khelate		Ananda Mukhopadhyay	Sailen Mukhopadhyay	
	Ei Toh Abar Nayane Amar	AIR Ramyageeti	Prakashkali Ghosal	Prakashkali Ghosal	
1958	Ek Baat Kahu Tumse (Hindi)	Sahara		Hemanta Mukherjee	
1971	Eka Mor Gaaner Tori	Ekhane Pinjar	Atul Prasad Sen	Atul Prasad Sen	
	Eki Sei Tumi				
	Ekhano Achhe To Oi Duti Dana				
1961	Ekta Gaan Likho Amar Janyo		Subir Hajra	Sudhin Dasgupta	
	Ekti Phul Bhalo Na Ektu Hashi Bhalo				
1954	Ektu Jodi Bhalo Laage	Maroner Pore	Mohini Choudhury	Sargam	
1955	Elo Ghoniye Barosha	QUM2KSVnqwo	Arup Bhattacharya	Chitto Roy	
1964	Gaaner Majhe Beche Thakbo	Kasti Pathar	Shyamal Gupta	Manabendra Mukhopadhyay	
1957	Ghir Ayi Badariya	Mathur	Meerabai	Dilip Kumar Roy	6JNL7WxNPpw
1955	Ghoom Aay Re Aay		Mangalacharan Chattopadhyay	Salil Choudhury	
1957	Ghum Ghum Nijhhum Nirabata	Harano Sur		Hemanta Mukherjee	
1971	Giriraj Konya Uma	Pratham Basanta		Robin Chatterjee	
1958	Golape Golape Ranga	Shri Shri Tarakeswar	Sailen Roy	Pabitra Chattopadhyay	
1952	Hay Amar Je Ghor Chhilo		Mohini Choudhury	Nitai Ghatak	
1954	Hoi Jodi Baralok Masto	Sadanander Mela		Kalipada Sen	
	Ja Ja Ja Jare Mon		Manas Chakrabarty	Manas Chakrabarty	
1972	Jabe Tulsitalay Priyo Sandhyabelay (first recording by Padma Rani Chattopadhyay 1938 )		Kazi Nazrul Islam	Kamal Dasgupta	
1957	Jage Kusume Gondho (with Utpala, Alpana, Gayatri)	Harishchandra			
	Jakhan Abar Dekha Holo		Miltu Ghosh	Hemanta Mukherjee	e_Y4JkixeV8
1955	Jale Bhasha Padma Ami		Shibdas Banerjee	Bupen Hazarika	
	Jao Jao Tumi Phire (first recording by Indubala Debi 1931 )		Kazi Nazrul Islam	Kazi Nazrul Islam	
	Jibaner Taape Shudhu				
1962	Jibanta Bhai Railer Gari	Mayar Sangsar		Robin Chatterjee	
1954	Har Dil Me Umang Nache	Maroner Pore	Mohini Choudhury, Pranab Roy	Sargam	
1960	Kaise Kaate Rajani (duet with Ustad Amir Khan)	Kshudito Pashan	Pandit Bhushan	Ali Akbar Khan	
1955	Kakhan Je Phul Phutlo	Dasyu Mohan	Bimal Ghosh	Rajen Sarkar	
1957	Kal Boli Kala Gelo Madhupure	Mathur	Chandidas	Dilip Kumar Roy	9STXNxIOoqI
	Kalankeri Bhaye Sakhi				
1965	Kalari Banshite (duet with Mrinal Chakraborty)	Mahalagna			
1956	Kankabotir Knankon Baje		Anal Chatterjee	Shyamal Mitra	
1962	Kanthe Amar Kantar Mala	Dadathakur			
1956	Kanya Tomar Kajol (Duet with Satinath Mukhopadhyay)	Asamapta		Anil Bagchi	
	Katha diye keno balo Shyam	Bhajan - All India Radio		-	
	Kato tuku Lekha Jay Chithite			Anupam Ghatak	
	Kaajal Dhoya Chokher Jale				
1956	Ke Jane Kakhon Meghe	Sinthir Sindur		Kalipada Sen	
	Keno Ailam Go (chorus with Sumitra Sen)	Folk – Dhamail			
	Keno Phul Phote				
1972	Kemone Toribo Tara	Anindita		Hemanta Mukherjee	
	Khejur Patay Nupur				
1973	Khoka Ghumalo Para Juralo	Bindur Chhele		Kalipada Sen	
1957	Ki Rup Herinu	Neelachole Mohaprobhu	Baishnab Mahajan	Rai Chand Baral	V6cEnDVKLN4
	Kishori Baani Shuniya	Padabali Kirtan			
	Klanto Shephalira Ghumiye Porechhe				
1957	Kon Se Gaaner Chhanda Niye	Punarmilan	Leela Debi	Kalipada Sen	
	Koi Go Koi Go Koi		Pulak Bandyopadhyay	Shyamal Mitra	
	Kshamiyo Hey Shib		Atul Prasad Sen	Atul Prasad Sen	
1969	Kusum Dolay Dole Shyam Rai	Parineeta		Hemanta Mukherjee	
	Lalita Go Dhik Rahu Jibane	Album Padavali Kirtan			Ec6IQNcC0e4
1958	Ma Ami Tor Khyapa Baul		Swami Styananda	Rathin Ghosh	
	Maa Thakuma Bolto Paan Kheye Thont Laal				rXKjL9Gaeo
1957	Madhab Bahut Minati	Neelachale Mahaprobhu		Rai Chand Baral	
1955	Madhur Madhur Mskaye	Dasyu Mohan	Pandit Bhushan	Rajen Sarkar	PaPVOVzPtQc
1976	Mago Emon Hoy Na Keno		Anal Chattopadhyay	Anal Chattopadhyay	
1957	Maharah Maharaj Phire Eso (duet with Manna De)	Harishchandra	Gouriprasanna Majumdar	Nachiketa Ghosh	L1No6D4uPWk
1961	Main Ho Gayee Diwani	Jhinder Bondi	Pandit Bhushan	Ali Akbar Khan	
	Main Toh Lio Pio Mol	Meera Bhajans			
1945	Mala Khani Diye Amare (in the name: Pratima Chatterjee)	Senola Records	Sukriti Sen	Sukriti Sen	
	Mala Theke Phul				
1956	Manmohan Shyam Hamare	Shyamoli	Pandit Bhshan	Kalipada Sen	JEraPsbIup0
	Mayur Je Nachhe		Gauriprasanna Majumdar	Nachiketa Ghosh	
1959	Megh Rangano Asto Akash		Prabodh Ghosh	Anal Chattopadhyay	455U_19GieU
1955	Meghla Bhanga Rod Uthechhe	Tar Aar Par Nei	Pulak Bandyopadhyay	Nachiketa Ghosh	
	Michhe Dosh Diyo Na Amay		Mukul Datta	Hemanta Mukherjee	
1963	Mon Je Khushi Khushi Aaj		Pulak Bandyopadhyay	Rotu Mukhopadhyay	
1966	Mon Nile Mon Dite Hoy	Rajodrohi		Ali Akbar Khan	
	Mone Agun Jwale				
	Mor Na Mitite Asha Bhangilo Khela	Abnibeena	Kazi Nazrul Islam	Kazi Nazrul Islam	
1960	Murali Baaje Prem Brindabone (duet with Samaresh Ray)	Goriber Meye	Bimal Ghosh	5iloaHZumts	
-	Musafir Kya Subha abhi ja			5iloaHZumts	
	Na Thak Na Thak Aaj				
	Naba Manjari Oi Phutechhe				
1972	Nache Mayuri Radha Kunja Majhe	Aalo Aamar Aalo	Pulak Bandyopadhyay	Pabitra Chattopadhyay	
1954	Nai Jodi Keu Shone	Sadanander Mela		Kalipada Sen	
1955	Nao Gaan Bhore Nao Pran Bhore		Salil Choudhury	Salil Choudhury	
1952	Natun Alor Gaan Amra	Andhar Surjyo			
	Nibhe Ja Raat Nibhe Jaa		Barun Biswas	Sudhin Dasgupta	
1954	Ningariya Neel Shari	Dhuli		Rajen Sarkar	
	Nirab Nijhum Nishiraat				
1966	Nohe Nohe Priyo E Noy Ankhijal	Album: Gems From Kazi Nazrul Islam	Kazi Nazrul Islam	Kazi Nazrul Islam	
1974	O Bishakha	Alo O Chhaya		Bijan Pal	
1964	O Ganga Onge Tomar	Album Puja	Arup Chattopadhyay	Anal Chattopadhyay	
1966	O Tiya Tore	Ek Saathe		Mrinal Banerjee	
1967	O Shalik Shalik	Miss Priyangbada	Shankar Bhattacharya	Subir Sen	
1963	Ogo Sagar Ami Bahir Holem	Dwiper Naam Tiyarang		Shyamal Mitra	
	Oi Akashe Klanti Nei			Abhijit Banerjee	
1960	Oi Jhilmil Nil Akashe	Prabesh Nishedh	Sudhin Dasgupta	Sudhin Dasgupta	
	Oi Kalo Rupe Laj				
1953	Oke Dharile To	Bau Thakuranir Haat		Dwijen Chowdhury	
	Patho Hara Pakhi	Album Amar Ganer Bulbuli	Kazi Nazrul Islam	Kazi Nazrul Islam	
1954	Phaguya Brij Dekhan	Dhuli		Rajen Sarkar	Y8eIyZV3Y8M
1961	Phande Pariya Boga Kande	Folk songs of Bengal – Bhaowaiya			
1974	Phul Bolleo Bhul Hoy	Sujata			
1966	Phuler Hasite Aar Olir Banshite	Harano Prem			
1960	Piya Bina Jiya Mora (duet with A T Kanan")				
1960	Piya Jao Jao				
1954	Pradip Kohilo Dakhina Samire		Arup Bhattacharya	Durga Sen	yYCLFM2onu4
1962	Prajapati Prajapati Re		Prabodh Ghosh	Anal Chattopadhyay	C-LWku7eNV4
1969	Prem Shudhu Ek Mombati		Sunil Baran	Sudhin Dasgupta	
	Priya Jao Jao Jao				fNtmRviQdjI
1945	Priyo Khule Rekho Batayon (in the name: Pratima Chatterjee)	Senola Records	Sukriti Sen	Sukriti Sen	
1981	Purush Je Tor Parashpathar	Kapalkundala		Hemanta Mukherjee	
1952	Raat Nijhum Hok Na Andhar Kalo	Andhar Surya		Rabin Chatterjee	VQFU8kX7tQ0
	Raater Deule Jage Birohi Tara			Himangshu Datta	
1954	Ratisukhsaare Gatamabhisaare (duet with Dwijen Mukhopadhyay)	Jaydeb	Jaydeb	Nachiketa Ghosh	huoGGtUaUlk
1954	Ras Ke Bhare More Nain	Dhuli		Rajen Sarkar	
	Rum Jhum Jhum Rum Jhum Jhum			Kazi Nazrul Islam	
	Sab-i Jodi Bhul		Prakashkali Ghosha	Prakashkali Ghosha	
1970	Sajani Go Rajanike Chole Jete Daao		Miltu Ghosh	Sudhin Dasgupta	
1971	Sakaler Alo Andharer Kalo	Jiban Jigyasa		Shyamal Mitra	
1969	Sansare Jodi Nahi Pai Sara	Parineeta	Atul Prasad Sen	Atul Prasad Sen	
1965	Saat Ronga Ek Pakhi		Subir Hajra	Sudhin Dasgupta	
1961	Saatti Tarar Ei Timir		Subir Hajra	Sudhin Dasgupta	
1960	Saadh Kare Pushilam Moyna (Duet with Nirmalendu Choudhury)	Natun Fashal		Rai Chand Boral	
1953	Se Din Guli Phiriye Dao		Mohinee Choudhury	Nitai Ghatak	
1968	Shukno Patar Nupur Paye	Album Sanjher Pakhira Phirilo Kulaye	Kazi Najrul Islam	Kazi Najrul Islam	
	Shyam Tumi Jodi Radha Hote				
1958	Sobuj Ghaser Bone	Saat Bhai Champa			
	Sonar Tari Noy Go Amar				
1963	Sondhya Belar Ekti	Kalsrot	Shyamal Gupta	Manabendra Mukhopadhyay	
1957	Shraaban Raate (duet with Shyamal Mitra	Aalo Andhare		Mrinal Bandyopadhyay	
1968	Sur Jhora Ei Nishi Raat	Teen Aadhyay		Gopen Mullick	
1957	Tandrahara Raat Oi Jege Roy			Hemanta Mukherjee	
1957	Taras Taras Gaye (duet with Swaruplata)	Antariksha	Pandit Bhushan	Ustad Ali Akbar Khan	
	Tobu Amay Mone Rekho		Biswanath Ganguly	Ustad Ali Akbar Khan	
1968	Tomar Bhubane Tumi	Teen Aadhay		Gopen Mullick	
	Tomar Deeper Alote Noy				
	Tomar Deoya Anguriyo		Barun Biswas	Sudhin Dasgupta	
1957	Tomar Du Chokhe Amar Swapna		Pulak Bandyopadhyay	Abhijit Banerjee	
	Tomare Cheyechhi Bole				
	Tomari Jharnatalar Nirjane		Rabindranath Thakur	Rabindranath Thakur	
1979	Tomay Keno Lagchhe Eto Chena		Pulak Bandopadhyay	Bhupen Hazarika	
	Tomay Peyechhi Ami	AIR Ramyageeti	Prakashkali Ghoshal	Unknown	
1970	Tora Sab Amar Bhadur Rupti Dekhe	Pratima		Hemanta Mukherjee	
1955	Tribeni Tirthapathe Ke Gahilo Gaan (duet with Chinmoy Lahiri)	Shap Mochan		Hemanta Mukherjee	
	Tumi Chokher Samne Dharo		Pulak Bandopadhyay	Manna De	
1954	Tumi Ele Aaj Ki Debo Tomay		Arup Bhattacharya	Durga Sen	
1972	Tumi Jodi Radha Hote Shyam		Kazi Najrul Islam	Kazi Najrul Islam	
1951	Uchhal Totini Ami	Sunonda'r Biye		Sudhirlal Chakraborty	

=== Films ===
List of Films (as playback singer)
Year	Film
1951	Sunonda'r Biye
1952	Andhar Surjyo
1953	Bouthakuranir Haat
1953	Laljhuti Kakatua
1954	Dhuli
1954	Jodu Bhatta
1954	Jaydev
1954	Sadanander Mela
1955	Aparadhi
1955	Bhalobasa
1955	Dasyu Mohan
1955	Hrod
1955	Shap Mochan
1955	Tar Aar Par Nei
1955	Shap Mochan
1956	Asamapta
1956	Putrabodhu
1956	Shyamali
1956	Sinthir Sindur
1957	Aalo Andhare
1957	Daata Karna
1957	Harano Sur
1957	Harishchandra
1957	Neelachale Mahaprobhu
1957	Punarmilan
1957	Tasher Ghar
1958	Bandhu
1958	Kalamati
1958	Sahara (Hindi)
1959	Ek Gochha Rajanigandha
1959	Janmantar
1959	Lalu Bhulu
1960	Goriber Meye
1960	Kshudito Pashan
1960	Natun Fasal
1960	Prabesh Nishedh
1961	Jhinder Bondi
1962	Bandhan
1962	Bipasha
1962	Dadathakur
1962	Mayar Sangsar
1963	Dwiper Naam Tiyarang
1963	Kalsrot
1963	Uttarayan
1964	Kasti Pathar
1965	Mahalagna
1965	Mukhujjye Paribar
1966	Angeekar
1966	Ek Saathe
1966	Harano Prem
1966	Rajodrohi
1967	Chhuti
1967	Miss Priyambada
1968	Chowranghee
1968	Teen Adhyaya
1969	Parineeta
1969	Sabarmati
1970	Pratima
1971	Ekhane Pinjar
1971	Jiban Jigyasa
1971	Pratham Basanta
1972	Aalo Aamar Aalo
1972	Anindita
1972	Shapath Nilam
1973	Bindur Chhele
1974	Alo O Chhaya
1974	Bisarjan
1974	Jadu Bangsha
1974	Sujata
1974	Thagini
1976	Asamay
1977	Golap Bou
1978	Joy Maa Tara
1979	Heerey Manik
1981	Kapalkundala
1987	Lalan Fakir

=== Others ===
Musical Opera

Pratima Bandopadhyay also rendered her voice in the following Musical Opera:

- Alibaba (Opera) Part-1 & 2 (Children Opera) created by Kshirod Prasad Bidyabinod. Drama: Pranab Ray, Music: V Blsara.
- Shree Radhar Manbhanjan (Religious Opera). Compilation: Pranab Ray, Music: Rabin Chattopadhyay.

Music Composition by Pratima Bandopadhyay

- Tandrahara Raat - Hemanta Mukhopadhyay; Lyrics - Debashis Chattopadhyay; Music - Pratima Bandopadhyay; (code 2vY3CeAHI8M).
