= Chinmoy Lahiri =

Indian vocalist (1920–1984)

Acharya Chinmoy Lahiri
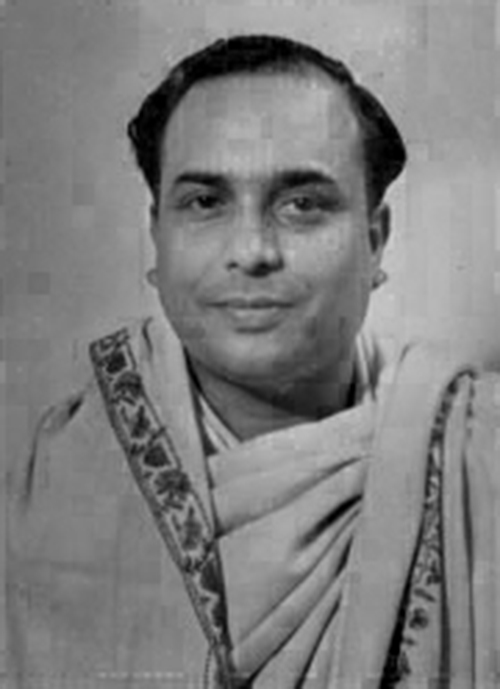
- আচার্য চিন্ময় লাহিড়ী

Background information
- Born: 20 March 1920; Tantibandh, Pabna, Undivided India under British rule
- Died: 17 August 1984 (aged 64) Calcutta, West Bengal, India
- Occupation: Singer
- Years active: 1935–1984

Acharya Chinmoy Lahiri (Bengali: আচার্য চিন্ময় লাহিড়ী; 20 March 1920 – 17 August 1984) was an Indian vocalist from Bengal in the Hindustani classical tradition. He is known for the Khayal form of singing, as well as for his popular renditions of Dhrupad, Thumri and Tappa, along with Bengali Raga-pradhan songs.

== Early life ==
Archrya Chinmoy Lahiri was born in a Zamindar family of Tantibandh, Pabna district, in the undivided India under British rule. His father Jeeb Chandra Lahiri was a civil engineer, at an alumnus of Bengal Engineering College, Shibpur, and his mother's name was Sarajubala Debi. He was brought up in Lucknow in his early years, where his father was working. His first teacher in music was Rabin Chattopadhyay. His passion for music brought Chinmoy to Marris College of Music, Lucknow (later Bhatkhande Sanskriti Vishwavidyalaya), where he took music lessons from Pandit Shrikrishna Narayan Ratanjankar, principal of the college. There he was accompanied with some young and talented students who all became great masters afterwards, such as V.G. Jog, S. C. R. Bhat and Dhruvtara Joshi etc. Subsequently, he took talim, lessons in music, from Dilip Chandra Vedi, Khalifa Khurshid Ali Khan, and Chhotey Khan. Chinmoy was a Gāndā-bāndh śāgīrd (disciple) of Pandit Ratanjhankar, who was a disciple of Pandit Bhatkhande and Ustad Faiaz Khan. From this lineage an inclination of Acharya Chinmoy towards Senia Gharana of Lucknow may be arrived at.

== Professional career ==
In 1936 Acharya Lahiri started his career in music as an approved artist in the All India Radio Lucknow station. He then joined Dhaka Radio. His first record was published in 1944 by His Master's Voice with two music tracks of Bengali Khyal, ‘Nā māne mānā’ and ‘Duwāre elo ke' by Gopal Dasgupta. During partition of India in 1947 Acharya Lahiri shifted to 'Calcutta' (Kolkata). His fame as a good music teacher spread wide and in 1967 he joined Rabindra Bharati University as a Professor in Music to continue till he breathed his last.

== Music of Acharya Lahiri ==
Archrya Chinmoy Lahiri represented an era of enlightenment in Bengal in the early 20th century, when, among other fields, Indian Classical Music too were being experimented with in the light of regional variations. Among the doyens of Indian Classical Music of Bengal of that time, Vishmadev Chattopadhyay, Tarapada Chakraborty, Jnanendra Prashad Goswami and Chinmoy Lahiri deserve special mention. Apart from pure Indian classical music, Acharya Chinmoy Lahiri was proficient and was an exponent of Khyal, Thumri, Geet, Gazal and Raga-pradhan songs. He created many Ragas too and wrote Bandish for many of the Ragas.

Contribution in Indian Classical Music

Archrya Chinmoy Lahiri created many Ragas, such as Shyamkos, Yogamaya, Prabhati Todi, Rajani Kalyan, Kushumi Kalyan, Gandharika, Nag Ranjani, Mangalati, Shivani and Shubhra.

Bandish created by Acharya Chinmoy Lahiri

Khyal: Bandhish written by Chinmoy Lahiri mostly depicts the sacred love of Radha and Krishna

Rāga: Darbari Kanaḍa, Tāla: Tritāla (Madhyalaya)
Sthāyī:
Kyā tum ho vahi śyām sāwariyā
Dhuṇd phiru bana bābariyā
Antarā:
Bāsuri ki dhvani
Bajāya kahi guni
Pukāre mohe Magana nāgariyā

Rāga: Deśi, Tāla: Tritala (Madhylaya)
Sthāyī:
Manaharwa curāye liyo jāy
Hiya ki pīra kise sunāy
Antarā:
Kā karu aba kuch nā suhāya
Magana milana bina kaise bitāye
Sakhī eri deho batāya

Thumri: A form of Indian Classical Music (semi-classical). Romantic poetic songs developed during Mughal era around Lucknow based on Bawra songs. There are a few Bandhish written by Chinmoy Lahiri for Thumri songs:

Rāga: Khāmbaz, Tāla: Jat
Sthāyī:
Akhiyā kāhe ko milāi
Mohe kiu prem ki rāha dikhāi
Barabasa pāsa bulākar apne
Ab kiu nainā churāi.
Antarā:
Terā mana nā jānu tu acaraja ki nāi
Ᾱnkho ojhala honā thā to phir kiu muskāi.

Kajri and Chaiti: Forms of Indian Classical Music (semi-classical) practiced in Doab region based on folk tradition. Following is a Bandhish written by Chinmoy Lahiri in Kajri :

Sthāyī:
Gheri kārī badariyā
Piyā rahile kaun nagariyā
Dekhi mana barsāy
Ghar āngana kachunā suhāy.
Antarā:
Bijalī chamake jaba jor
Dharakata hai hiyā mor
Lipata rahu suni sejariyā.

Contribution in Bengali Movies

Archrya Chinmoy Lahiri's first performance as a playback singer was in the year 1950 in the Bengali film Maandanda starring actor Chhabi Biswas. He also contributed his voice in films ‘Dvairath’, ‘Antaraal’, ‘Shapmochan’, ‘Jeebanniye’ ‘Bapu ne kaha tha’ etc. His song "ত্রিবেণী তীর্থ পথে" (Tribenī tīrtha pathe) became a milestone in the history of Bengali film music, in the film ‘Shap Mochan’ in 1955, sung in duet with Pratima Bandopadhyay, starring Uttam Kumar and Suchitra Sen. He composed music for Bengali movie Jiban Niye in 1976.

Awards and recognition

Acharya Chinmoy Lahiri was felicitated by Morris College with the title of Sangit Visharad'.

== Legacy ==
Acharya Lahiri's legacy is being carried forward by his disciples. Though he did not belong to any Gharana, he created his own style or Gharana. Names of a few of his disciples are Parveen Sultana, Mandira Lahiri, Shyamlal Lahiri etc.

- Pandit Lahiri wrote two books, "Magan Geet" and "Taan Manjari".

== Memoirs ==
- Bidushi Mandira Lahiri, wife of Pandit Shyamlal Lahiri, remembered about his father-in-law Pandit Chinmoy Lahiri in his interview recorded by Rajeswary Ganguly Banerjee on the behest of Rabindra Bharati University, that Pandit Lahiri always stressed on punctuality and was very strict as a Guru while enacting Riyaz (practice sessions). His frequently used phrase was "karo ya maro".
