= Vishmadev Chattopadhyay =

Indian singer (1909–1977)

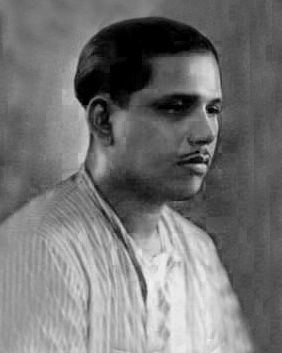

Background information
- Born: 8 November 1909; Sarai village, Hooghly, Bengal Presidency, British India
- Died: 8 August 1977 (aged 67) Calcutta, West Bengal, India
- Genres: Indian classical musician and Vocal artist
- Occupations: Singer, Composer, Music Director

Vishmadev Chattopadhyay (8 November 1909 – 8 August 1977) was an eminent vocal artist in Indian Classical Music, a revered Guru (or Ustad) in the Delhi Gharana of the vocal classical genre, and a music director in Bengali Film Industry in its early era.

== Early life ==
Vishmadev was born on 8 November 1909 at Sarai village near Pandua station of Hooghly district in West Bengal of Ashutosh Chattopadhyay and Prabhabati Devi. His family was known to have spiritual inclinations, being descendants of Sadhak Gangananda Swami, and had relations with the family of Shri Ramakrishna (born Gadadhar Chattopadhyay).

== Education and music ==
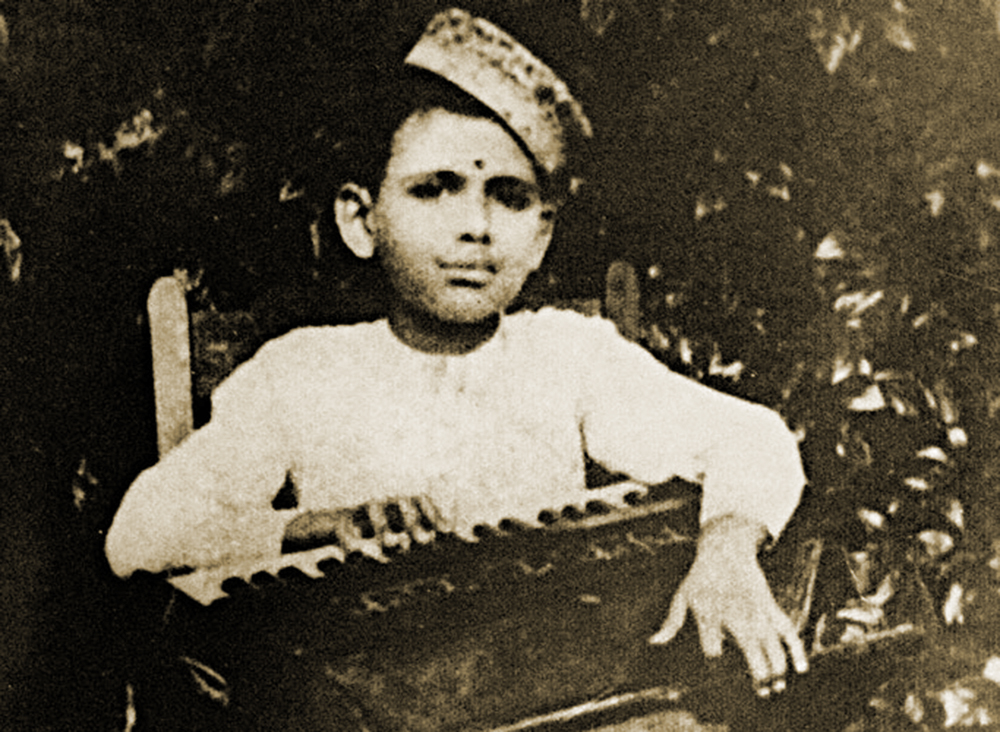
Vishmadev Chattopadhyay in his childhood

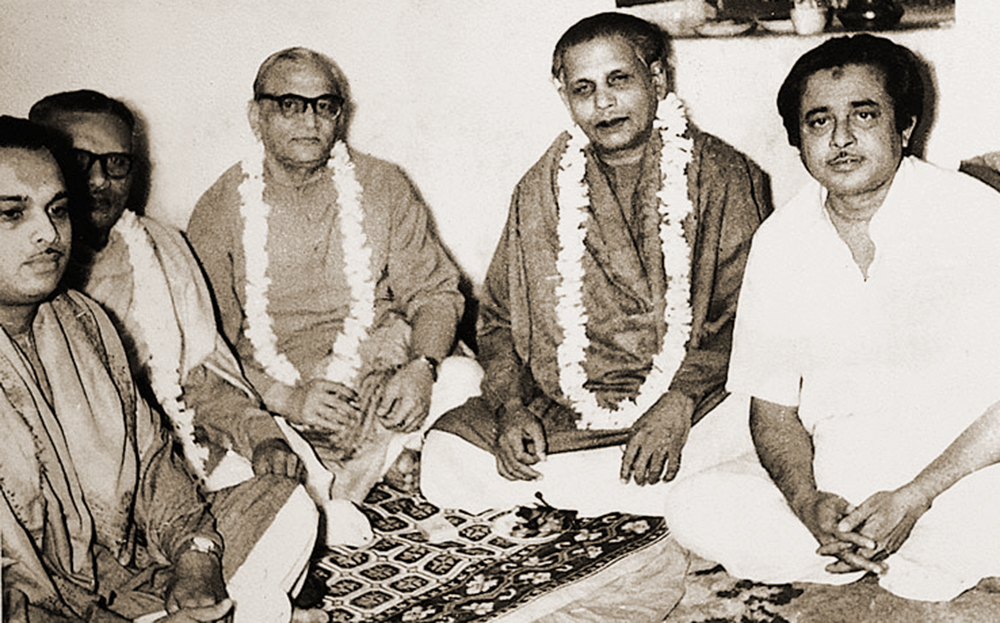
Vishmadev Chattopadhyay with Rai Chand Boral and others

Vishmadev was known to have shown proficiency in music since his childhood, and considered as child prodigy. He studied at Sanskrit Collegiate School in Calcutta. Then he joined Calcutta Training Academy where from he passed his entrance examination. After passing he joined Vidyasagar College.

First lesson

First lessons in Classical music was imparted to him by Shri Nagendranath Datta. He received training (তালিম) from Khalifa Badal Khan of Delhi gharana for fourteen years, and also collected some bandish from Ustad Faiyaz Khan from Arga gharana. His first album was released from His Master's Voice with two songs depicting Toppa of Nidhubabu (নিধুবাবুর টপ্পা) during May, 1926. The two songs of his first record were "সখী কি করে লোকের কথায়" in Raga Khamaj and "এত কি চাতুরী সহে প্রাণে" (Record No. P7402). His last recording released from Megaphone Company in July 1968 too contained the same song "সখী কি করে লোকের কথায়" (Record No JNG 6237). He earned fame and reverence for his contribution in Khayal in Hindusthani Classical Music. In 1933 he was appointed as a music director cum trainer in the Megaphone Record Company.

Professional engagement

In 1933 at the insistence of Nazrul Islam Vishmadev joined Megaphone Company as the music director and Instructor. He regularly published records on Khayal. Sometime during 1936 Mr. J.N. Ghosh, the owner of Megaphone Company, along with poet Ajay Bhattacharya requested him to sing Bengali songs. On the day of recording Vismadev instantly composed music for the poem written by Ajay Bhattacharya and completed recording. the songs were: ‘ফুলের দিন হল যে অবসান’ and ‘শেষের গানটি ছিল তোমার লাগি’.

In 1937 Vishmadev joined Film Corporation as music director. He directed music for six Bengali movies and six Hindi movies . Sachin Dev Burman was his assistant in four theses movies. The first movie of this series, "Rikta" (1939), directed by Sushil Majumdar, was a milestone film as it made a great stir in the music world by mingling the tune of east and west for the first time in any Indian film .

The rabindra Sangeet legend Chinmoy Chattopadhyay received training on classical music from him at a stretch for twelve long years.

== Discography ==
Contribution as a Vocal artist

Songs of Ustad Vishmadev Chattopadhyay
Song	Year	Language	Type/Album	Lyrics	Music	Code
Aad Ayori - Asha	-	Hindi	-	-	-	
Aai Re Rut Basant - Basant	-	Hindi	-	-	-	
Ab Ho Lalan - Bihag	-	Hindi	-	-	-	
Bamana De Bata - Shankara	-	Hindi	-	-	-	
Barashe Meharba - Gaud Malhar	-	Hindi	-	-	-	
Dukhwa Main Kase - Tilak Kamod	-	Hindi	-	-	-	
Eto ki Chaturi	-	Bangla	-	-	-	
Ha Mana Bhabania - Dhani	-	Hindi	-	-	-	
Jago aalok logone	1937	Bangla	Ajay Bhattacharya	Vishmadev Chattopadhyay	-	
Jodi mone pore sediner kotha - Kafi Bhairavi	1937	Bangla	Ajay Bhattacharya	Vishmadev Chattopadhyay	-	Ut6tna4N3Js
Lagat Hai Kalejwa - Bhairavi	-	Hindi	-	-	-	
Mati Malnia - Kamod	-	Hindi	-	-	-	
Mukh Mor Mor - Malkaush	-	Hindi	-	-	-	
Nabarun raage tumi saathi go - Bhairavi	-	Bangla	-	-	-	kzCx8rCE1SM
Phagwa Brij Dekhan - Basant	-	Hindi	-	-	-	
Phul Ban Ki - Deshi	-	Hindi	-	-	-	
Phulero Din Holoje Abshan - Jay Jayanti	-	Bangla	-	-	-	m73du16QWtk
Pia Pardesh - Dhansi	-	Hindi	-	-	-	
Pir Na Jaani - Malkaush	-	Hindi	-	-	-	
Piu Piu Ratata - Lalit	-	Hindi	-	-	-	
Rasili Tori Ankhiya - Bhairavi	-	Hindi	-	-	-	
Rut Basant Apnee - Rageshri Bahar	-	Hindi	-	-	-	
Saiyan Tu Ek Beri - Pilu	-	Hindi	-	-	-	
Shesher gaan ti chhilo - Kafi Bhairavi	-	Bangla	-	-	-	ox5wZ0FmY7o
Sokhi Lokeri Kathay	-	Bangla	-	-	-	
Soi ki kore	-	Hindi	-	-	-	
Tabo Lagi Byatha	-	Bangla	-	-	-	
Tande Salam - Tilang	-	Hindi	-	-	-	

Contribution as a Music Director

Music directed by Vishmadev Chattopadhyay
Drama/Movie	Year	Director	Lyrics	Author	Cast	Producer
Amar Geeti	1940	Hiren Bose	-	-	Nripati Chattopadhyay, Tulsi Lahiri Satya Mukhopadhyay, Ahindra Choudhury and Chhaya Devi	Film Corporation Of India Ltd.
Khona (Drama)	1935	Prabhodh Chandra Guha and Ahindra Choudhury	Akhil Niogi	Manmatha Roy	Shibkali Chattopadhyay as Vikramaditya; Ahindra Choudhury - Baraha; Srimati Sarajubala - KHONA	Mani Ghosh & Art Theater Limited (Star Theater)
Khona (Movie)	1938	Jyotish Chandra Bandyopadhyay	Akhil Niogi	Manmatha Roy	Nripati Chattopadhyay, Tulsi Lahiri Satya Mukhopadhyay, Ahindra Choudhury and Chhaya Devi	B L Khemka (Metropolitan Pictures)
Muktisnan	1937	Sushil Majumdar	-	-	Nripati Chattopadhyay, Jiban Gangopadhyay, Sabitri Devi	Film Corporation Of India Ltd.
Rajaki	1937	Sukumar Dasgupta	-	-	Dhiraj Bhattacharya, Kanu Bandyopadhyay, Nabadwip Haldar, Debabala, Satya Mukhopadhyay, Menoka Debi, Rajlakshmi Debi	Kamala Talkies
Rikta	1939	Sushil Majumdar	-	-	Ahindra Choudhury and Chhaya Devi	Film Corporation Of India Ltd.
Tatinir Bichar	1940	Sushil Majumdar	-	-	Nripati Chattopadhyay, Ardhendu Mukhopadhyay, Ahindra Choudhury, Kali Banerjee (debut) and Suhasini Devi	Film Corporation Of India Ltd.

== Memoirs ==
Vishmadev is remembered as a maestro and an exponent in rendition of Khayal and Thumri, and extremely revered in his field. Observations from a few eminent personalities are compiled as under:

== Legacy ==
- Acharya Vishmadev is remembered not only for the outstanding rendition of his songs such as Khyal, Thumri and Bhajans, but also for his patronage towards research and training initiatives in Hindusthani Classical Music. He was creator of Bengali Ragpradhan gaan. His famous disciples include Kumar Shyamanand Singh, Sachin Mukherjee, Sachin Dev Barman, Bivash Dev Barman, Suresh Chakraborty, Uma Basu, Kananbala Devi, Pahari Sanyal, Prakash Kali Ghoshal, Bhabani Das, Pratima Bandopadhyay, Himangshu Roy, Saila Devi, Juthika Roy, Begam Aakhtar, Sabita Dey, Akhtari Bai, Chhaya Devi, Chinmoy Chattopadhyay and Jayanta Chattopadhyay (son), to name a few.
- He is the only Bengali classical vocalist who got invitation to perform from all over the then undivided India. He had founded new style of harmonium playing, one record of his harmonium playing is preserved in London Museum .
- UNESCO collected two records of his four songs to give an idea of Indian Music.
- A street in New Alipur, Kolkata, is named after him—Pd Vishmadev Chattopadhay Sarani.
- An NGO named "Vishmadev Memorial Trust" had been formed having registration no. 12661/09, in 30, Sarkar Lane, Kolkata 700007, under the chairmanship of Sri Jayanta Chattopadhyay, son of the revered maestro, to cultivate, protect and propagate the systematic methodical and scientific training of traditional music and the gayaki of Vishmadev gharana for the future generation.
- Vishmadev Memorial Trust produced two documentary films on his life, directed by Sri Jayanta Chattopadhay -- "Sangeet Ratnakar Vishmadev" in 2008 and "Vishmadev-Ek Kimbadanti" in 2009.Even Kazi najrul Islam was an admirer of Vishmadev . On his request he joined Megaphone Company in 1933 as music director cum trainer.

== Awards and recognition ==
- 1972: Honorary D.Lit by Rabindra Bharati University.
- 1975: Documentary film on the life of Acharya Vishmadev Chattopadhyay by Government of West Bengal.
- 1976: Sangeet Nayak Puraskar by Prachin Kala Kendra Chandigarh.
- 1979: Documentary film on the life of Acharya Vishmadev Chattopadhyay by Kolkata Doordarshan.
- 1991: Documentary film on the life of Acharya Vishmadev Chattopadhyay by Kolkata Doordarshan.
- 2006: Posthumous Swami Santadas Smarak Samman by Swami Santadas Institute of Culture.
- 2006: Documentary film on the life of Acharya Vishmadev Chattopadhyay by Kolkata Doordarshan.
