= Nachiketa Ghosh =

Indian film composer and music director (1925–1976)

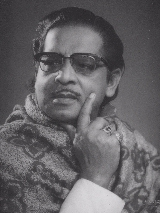
- Born: 28 January 1925; Calcutta, Bengal Presidency, British India
- Died: 12 October 1976 (aged 51); Calcutta, West Bengal, India
- Education: University of Calcutta
- Occupations: Music director and composer
- Children: Suparna Kanti Ghosh

Nachiketa Ghosh (28 January 1925 – 12 October 1976) was an Indian music director. He mainly composed Bengali, Hindi and Oriya songs. He was one of the foremost music directors and composers during the Golden Era of Bengali modern songs and cinema. He was a close associate of lyricist Gauriprasanna Mazumdar and Pulak Bandyopadhyay and worked with them in many films.

== Early life ==
He was born on 28 January 1925 at Shyambazar in Kolkata into a music-loving family. His father Dr. Sanat Kumar Ghosh was a well-known physician and classical music connoisseur. His father was a gold-medalist doctor and also served as the physician to Dr. Bidhan Chandra Roy, the renowned Chief Minister of West Bengal. At the age of 24, Nachiketa made his debut as a promising music director and ushered in a new trend in the world of Bengali music. His professional debut as a music director was with the release of Boudir Bon in 1953.

== Musical career ==
In 1950s through the 1970s, the music of Nachiketa Ghosh immortalized numerous Bengali films. His compositions played an immense role in the success of many landmark movies starring Uttam Kumar. Nachiketa Ghosh his professional musical career in the early 1950s and rapidly rose to prominence as one of the foremost music directors in Bengali cinema. His debut as a film music director came with Boudir Bon (1953), followed shortly by Joydeb (1954), which earned him widespread critical and popular recognition.

He spent some time in Bombay working in Hindi cinema, collaborating with renowned artists such as Lata Mangeshkar, Mohammed Rafi, Manna Dey, Kishore Kumar, and Hemanta Mukhopadhyay. A few years later, he returned to Kolkata and resumed his creative work in Bengali cinema. He composed music for highly acclaimed films like Dhanni Meye, Mouchak, Sannyasi Raja, Nishi Padma, Stree, and Bilambita Loy all of which have secured a permanent place in the golden history of Bengali cinema.

His filmography boasts timeless songs such as "Mou Bone Aaj", "Malati Bhromore", "Nishi Raat Banka Chand", "Putul Nebe Go", "Neer Choto Khoti Nei", "Surjo Dobar Pala", "Jodi Bhabo Eto Khelaghar", and "Kichimichi Kichimichi". Beyond film composition, he created numerous popular modern and original songs—such as "Amar Ganer Swaralipi Lekha Robe", "Tumi Ele Onek Dine Pore Tobe Brishti Elo", "Ek Phota Chokher Jol", "Bone Noy Mone Mor", "Ek Tajmahal Goro". He established himself as a legendary figure in music and died on 12 October 1976.

== Filmography ==
Year	Film	Songs	Notes
1953	Boudir Bon	"All songs"	
1954	Joydeb	"All songs"	
1955	Nishiddha Phal	"All songs"	
1955	Pather Sheshey	"All songs"	
1955	Jharer Pare	"All songs"	
1955	Bhalobasha	"All songs"	
1955	Ardhangini	"All songs"	
1956	Asamapta	"Rimiki Jhimiki Chhande"	Composed with Anupam Ghatak, Anil Bagchi, Durga Sen & Bhupen Hazarika
1956	Asamapta	"Purnima Noy E Je"	Composed with Anupam Ghatak, Anil Bagchi, Durga Sen & Bhupen Hazarika
1956	Asamapta	"Kando Keno Mon Re"	Composed with Anupam Ghatak, Anil Bagchi, Durga Sen & Bhupen Hazarika
1956	Trijama	"All songs"	
1956	Nabajanma	"All songs"	
1957	Tapashi	"All songs"	
1957	Prithibi Amare Chay	"All songs"	
1957	Harishchandra	"All songs"	
1957	Natun Prabhat	"All songs"	
1957	Rastar Chhele	"All songs"	
1958	Bandhu	"All songs"	
1958	Bhanu Pelo Lottery	"All songs"	
1958	Indrani	"All songs"	
1958	Rajdhani Theke	"All songs"	
1959	Chaowa Pawa	"All songs"	
1959	Swapna Puri	"All songs"	
1959	Kichhukkhon	"All songs"	
1959	Nirdharita Silpir Anupastithi Tey	"All songs"	
1959	Personal Assistant	"All songs"	
1960	Akash-Patal	—	Composed the score only
1960	Haat Baralei Bandhu	"All songs"	
1960	Kshudha	"All songs"	
1960	Chup Chupi Ase	"All songs"	
1960	Biyer Khata	"All songs"	
1961	Kanamachi	"All songs"	
1964	Kantatar	"All songs"	
1968	Chotto Jigyasa	"All songs"	
1968	Rakta Rekha	"All songs"	
1969	Chiradiner	"All songs"	
1969	Shesh Theke Suru	"Bolo Hari Hari Bol"	Composed with Anil Bagchi
1970	Bilambita Loy	"All songs"	
1970	Nishi Padma	"All songs"	
1971	Dhanyee Meye	"All songs"	
1971	Chhinnapatra	"All songs"	
1971	Fariyaad	"All songs"	
1972	Stree	"All songs"	
1973	Notun Diner Alo	"All songs"	
1973	Nakal Sona	"All songs"	
1973	Bon Palashir Padabali	"O Bhaber Nagori"	Composed with Shyamal Mitra, Satinath Mukherjee, Dwijen Mukherjee & Adhir Bagchi
1973	Agni Bhramar	"All songs"	
1973	Shabari	"All songs"	
1973	Nani Gopaler Biye	"All songs"	
1974	Shravan Sandhya	"All songs"	
1974	Alor Thikana	"All songs"	
1974	Asati	"All songs"	
1974	Sujata	"All songs"	Composed with Rabindranath Tagore
1975	Mouchak	"All songs"	
1975	Chhutir Phande	"All songs"	
1975	Nagar Darpane	"All songs"	
1975	Kajallata	"All songs"	
1975	Priyo Bandhabi	"All songs"	
1975	Sanyasi Raja	"All songs"	
1975	Swayamsiddha	"All songs"	
1976	Hotel Snow Fox	"All songs"	
1976	Anandamela	"All songs"	
1976	Mombati	"All songs"	
1976	Sei Chokh	"All songs"	
1977	Asadharan	"All songs"	Posthumous release
1979	Brajabuli	"All songs"	Posthumous release
1984	Abhishek	"Keno Mala Dile"	Composed with Nita Sen; Posthumous release
1984	Abhishek	"Juge Juge Ami Dekhechhi"	Composed with Nita Sen; Posthumous release
1984	Abhishek	"Apode Bipade"	Composed with Nita Sen; Posthumous release
