= Priyo Bandhabi =

1975 film

- প্রিয় বান্ধবী
- Directed by: Hiren Nag
- Written by: Probodh Kumar Sanyal
- Starring: Tarun Kumar Chatterjee; Bhanu Bannerjee; Suchitra Sen; Uttam Kumar; Dilip Mukherjee; Haradhan Bannerjee; Nripati Chatterjee; Nirmal Ghosh; Suhil Majumdar; Gyanesh Mukherjee; Mani Srimani
- Edited by: Ardhendu Chatterjee
- Music by: Nachiketa Ghosh
- Production company: M. S. Productions
- Release date: 3 October 1975
- Running time: 120 min.
- Country: India
- Language: Bengali

Priyo Bandhabi is a 1975 Bengali-language romantic comedy film directed by Hiren Nag. This film was written by Prabodh Kumar Sanyal. The film's music was composed by Nachiketa Ghosh. The film stars Uttam Kumar, Bhanu Bannerjee, Suchitra Sen, Dilip Mukherjee, Haradhan Bannerjee and Tarun Kumar Chatterjee in the lead roles.

== Cast ==
- Tarun Kumar Chatterjee
- Bhanu Bannerjee
- Suchitra Sen
- Uttam Kumar
- Dilip Mukherjee
- Haradhan Bannerjee
- Gyanesh Mukherjee
- Nripati Chatterjee
- Nirmal Ghosh
- Suhil Majumdar
- [Mani Srimani]

== Soundtrack ==
All songs are written by Gauriprasanna Mazumder and composed by Nachiketa Ghosh.

No.	Title	Singer	Length
1.	"Emon Ekti Galpo Bolte Paro"	Sandhya Mukherjee	3:29
2.	"Ami Sahebo Noi Golamo Noi"	Hemanta Mukherjee	2:35
3.	"Paathyeo Kichhu Nei"	Dwijen Mukherjee	2:39
4.	"Bhagyata Je Teente Tasher Khela"	Hemanta Mukherjee	2:42
Total length:			11:25
