= Sahajatri =

1951 film

- Directed by: Agradoot
- Story by: Sailen Roy
- Starring: Uttam Kumar; Molina Devi; Bharati Devi; Kamal Mitra
- Edited by: Kamal G
- Music by: Rabin Chattopadhyay
- Production company: M.P. Productions Pvt. Ltd.
- Release date: 10 March 1951
- Country: India
- Language: Bengali

Sahajatri was a Bengali drama film directed by Agradoot. This movie was released on 10 March 1951 under the banner of M. P. Productions Pvt. Ltd. The music direction was done by Rabin Chattopadhyay. This movie stars Uttam Kumar, Molina Devi, Bharati Devi, Sabitri Chatterjee and Kamal Mitra in the lead roles. This was the first time Uttam Kumar appeared under this name and kept it permanently from change to Arup Kumar. This was the first ever collaboration of Uttam Kumar and Agradoot. Unfortunately the film was unsuccessful in box office.

== Cast ==
- Uttam Kumar
- Bharati Devi
- Gouri Shankar Panda
- Gautam Mukherjee
- Haridhan Mukhopadhyay
- Jahar Gangopadhyay
- Kamal Mitra
- Sabitri Chatterjee
- Karabi Gupta
- Molina Devi
- Probha Debi
- Panchanan Bhattacharya

== Soundtrack ==
Sahajatri

Soundtrack album by Rabin Chatterjee
- Released: 1951
- Recorded: 1950
- Studio: M.P Productions Pvt Ltd
- Length: 0:05:43
- Label: Sa Re Ga Ma Pa
- Producer: Tarak Pal

Rabin Chatterjee chronology
Rudradeep (1951)	Sahajatri (1951)	Subhadra (1951)

For the first time Hemanta Mukherjee sang on Uttam Kumar's lip. There pair was become most popular from mid 50s and to be continued to Uttam's rest of career.

All lyrics are written by Gauriprasanna Mazumder; all music is composed by Rabin Chatterjee.

Songs
No.	Title	Playback	Length
1.	"Bhalobasar Parashmani"	Hemant Kumar	2:46
2.	"Phool Hashe Aar Cheye Dekhi"	Hemant Kumar	2:57
Total length:			5:43
