= Chinmoy Chattopadhyay =

Indian singer

Background information
- Born: Chinmoy Chattopadhyay; 1930; Calcutta, West Bengal, India
- Died: 1987 (aged 56–57)
- Genres: Rabindrasangeet
- Occupations: Singer
- Years active: 1960–1987
- Labels: His Master's Voice, Saregama

Chinmoy Chattopadhyay (Bengali: চিন্ময় চট্টোপাধ্যায়; also Chinmoy Chatterjee; 7 October 1930 – 27 July 1987) was a Bengali singer, primarily known for singing Rabindrasangeet songs. He is widely considered as one of the greatest exponents of Rabindrasangeet.

== Life and career ==
Chinmoy Chattopadhyay was born in 1930 in 51/B Shambhunath Pandit Street in Bengal, India. His father was Narendranath Chattopadhyay. He passed Matriculation from Tirthapati Institution in Calcutta and BA from Ashutosh College, West Bengal, India.

Vishmadev Chattopadhyay was an eminent vocal artist in Indian Classical Music, a revered Guru (আচার্য্য or Ustad) in the Delhi Gharana of the vocal classical genre, and a music director in the Bengali Film Industry in its early era.

When Chinmoy Chattopadhyay was a student, one day he had the opportunity to see a program of Vishmadev Chattopadhyay, one of the leading classical singers of India. Vishmadev Chattopadhyay's house was then in North Calcutta. Chinmoy went with some friends to watch the show. Vishmadev Chattopadhyay asked, "You have come here to listen to music, do you know any music?" Pushing the silent Chinmoy, his friends started saying, "you know the song! Tell him?"

On hearing this, Vishmadev Babu requested Chinmoy to sing a song. Chinmoy sang a song using a Tanpura. Bhishmadev Babu had tears in his eyes after being stunned for a while. Said, "Will you learn music?" At his words, Chinmoy got a great opportunity. The next day Vishmadev Chattopadhyay himself went to Chinmoy's house. Bhishmadev Chattopadhyay himself told Chinmoy's father that day that he would teach Chinmoy music, as well as continue studying.

His first song to be sung on Akashvani was probably 'তুমি ডাক দিয়েছ কোন সকালে'. After auditioning on Chinmoy Radio with confidence, he knew very well that he would be accepted. Not only that, he was once a regular artist in Akashvani.

His first record in college life was released on a 78 rpm disc record by His Master's Voice in 1954. "Tumi Sandhyar Meghmala" and "Aji Bijan Ghare" on the disc, the song stirred the audience.

Chinmoy Chattopadhyay took training in classical music (vocal) from Bhishmadev Chattopadhyay for about twelve consecutive years. He used to sing in Akashvani from the age of only nineteen.

He started singing Rabindrasangeet songs in the 1950s. He stood out among other stalwarts like Hemanta Mukhopadhyay and Debabrata Biswas and became extremely popular due to his melodious voice. He recorded more than 150 Rabindrasangeet songs and was a regular fixture on All India Radio's programs on Rabindrasangeet.

He died on 27 July 1987, at the age of 57, due to liver ailments.

In the Rabindra Sarobar area of Kolkata, the Russa Road East 2nd Lane, north of the Tollygunge Metro station, was rechristened as the Chinmoy Chatterjee Sarani after him. His residential address is 84, Chinmoy Chatterjee Sarani, Kolkata.

== Discography ==
Chinmoy Chattopadhyay with Suchitra Mitra, Purnima Mukhopadhyay, Kanika Bandopadhyay and Maya Sen, all notable exponents of Rabindrasangeet

Chinmoy Chattopadhyay sang many Rabindrasangeet which were widely released during his lifetime as well as after his death.

Year	Album	Other artists
1966	Bhara Thak Smritisudhai	
1968	Rare Gems Tagore	
1968	Golden Hour – Sentimental Favorites	
1970	Ebar Amay Dakle Dure	
1970	Golden Hour – Songs of Tagore	
1970	Hriday Basanta Bone	
1971	Kholo Go Ankhi – Golden Hour	
1978	Bhalo Jodi Basho Sokhi	
1979	Sanchayan	with Sumitra Sen
1979	Sanchayan – Sandhyar Meghmala	
1982	Alo Amar Alo Ogo	
1986	Aparna Madhuri	Various Artists
1989	Dinsesher Ranga Mukul	
2005	Durer Bandhu	
2011	Tridhara	with Sumitra Sen and Sagar Sen
