= Chaowa Pawa (1959 film) =

1959 film

- Poster
- Directed by: Sachin Mukherjee; Dilip Mukherjee; Tarun Majumdar
- Written by: Nripendrakrishna Chatterjee
- Screenplay by: Nripendrakrishna Chatterjee
- Based on: It Happened One Night
- Starring: Uttam Kumar; Suchitra Sen; Chhabi Biswas; Tulsi Chakraborty; Jiben Bose; Bharati Devi
- Cinematography: Anil Gupta; Jyoti Laha
- Edited by: Dulal Dutta
- Music by: Nachiketa Ghosh
- Production company: Time Films
- Distributed by: Mitali Films Private Limited
- Release date: 27 February: 27 February 1959
- Running time: 120 minutes
- Country: India
- Language: Bengali

Chaowa Pawa (transl. Desires and Fulfilment) is a 1959 Indian Bengali-language romantic comedy film directed by three directors Sachin Mukherjee, Dilip Mukherjee, and Tarun Majumdar. It is based on the 1934 Academy Awards winning American film It Happened One Night. The film stars Uttam Kumar and Suchitra Sen in lead roles. This was the directorial debut of Majumder and became a huge success.

== Plot ==
Rajat is a young journalist who works for Manju's father's newspaper agency and is on the verge of being fired. He meets Manju, who has run away from home. He falls in love with her.

== Cast ==
- Uttam Kumar as Rajat Sen, a young, smart journalist working as an employee under Manju's father at the newspaper agency 'Janamat', who initially eyes for the bounty announced for Manju's return but later falls in love with her.
- Suchitra Sen as Manju Chowdhury, the single daughter of a rich, newspaper tycoon, who initially is short-tempered and spoiled kid later turns into a benevolent and sweet personality as she gradually develops a romantic interest in Rajat.
- Chhabi Biswas as Manju's father K. Chowdhury, a newspaper tycoon, and a dignified man full of authority and professionalism. He is a caring father, who is determined to marry his daughter to a person of his choice initially and later announces prize money over his daughter's safe return.
- Tulsi Chakraborty as Chakraborty "Chokkotty" Moshai, a clever innkeeper who plots a plan to grab the prize money.
- Jiben Bose as Banku/Banka, Rajat's friend, a jovial good-hearted person who invites Rajat and Manju to his home.
- Bharati Devi as Banku's wife, a friendly woman who acts as a catalyst in Rajat and Manju's relationship.
- Anil Chatterjee as office staff of newspaper company.
- Amar Mullick
- Rajlakshmi Devi as Chakraborty's wife.
- Shailen Mukherjee as guest house manager.

== Crew ==
- Director: Tarun Majumdar, Sachin Mukherjee, Dilip Mukherjee (as Yatrik
- Producer: Time Films
- Music director: Nachiketa Ghosh
- Cinematographer: Anil Gupta, Jyoti Laha
- Playback singer: Hemanta Mukherjee, Sandhya Mukhopadhyay

== Soundtrack ==
Chawa Pawa

Soundtrack album by Nachiketa Ghosh
- Released: 1959
- Recorded: 1958
- Studio: Time Films
- Length: 0:06:44
- Label: Sa Re Ga Ma Pa

Nachiketa Ghosh chronology
Bandhu (1958)	Chawa Pawa (1959)	Rajdhani Theke (1959)

All lyrics are written by Gauriprasanna Mazumder; all music is composed by Nachiketa Ghosh.

Songs
No.	Title	Playback	Length
1.	"Jodi Babo E To Khelaghar"	Hemant Kumar	2:56
2.	"Ei Je Kache Daka"	Sandhya Mukherjee	3:29
Total length:			6:25

== Reception ==
This is the debut film of the legendary director Tarun Majumder. The film is one of the most iconic films of Uttam Suchitra pair. The film became a blockbuster hit at the box office and ran over 63 days in theaters.
