= Indrani (film) =

1958 Bengali language film

- Bengali: ইন্দ্রাণী
- Directed by: Niren Lahiri
- Written by: Achintya Kumar Sengupta; Gauriprasanna Mazumder (lyrics)
- Screenplay by: Nripendrakrishna Chattopadhyay
- Story by: Achintya Kumar Sengupta
- Produced by: Harindranath Chattopadhyay
- Starring: Uttam Kumar; Suchitra Sen
- Cinematography: Bishu Chakraborty
- Edited by: Baidyanath Chatterjee
- Music by: Nachiketa Ghosh
- Production company: H.N.C. Productions
- Distributed by: Chitra Paribeshak
- Release date: 10 October 1958 (Kolkata)
- Running time: 123 minutes
- Country: India
- Language: Bengali

Indrani is a Bengali romantic drama film directed by Niren Lahiri based on a story of Achintya Kumar Sengupta. This film was released in 1958 under the banner of H.N.C. Productions. Nachiketa Ghosh was the music director of the movie. The film stars Uttam Kumar and Suchitra Sen in lead role. This was the first Bengali film where the legendary playback singer Mohammed Rafi was featured. Later he worked with Uttam Kumar in 1967 film Chhoti Si Mulaqat. The film became a blockbuster hit at the box office and ran over 70 days in theaters.

== Plot ==
Indrani Mukherjee the only daughter of a staunch Brahmin in a village studies at Kolkata and stays in a girls' hostel. She meets Sudarshan Dutta, who had a brilliant career as a student and is doing his PhD. They fall in love, and Indrani wants to get married with him as soon as possible. She goes back to her village and informs her father of her intention to get married, Indrani's father takes umbrage as Sudarshan is not a Brahmin and also unemployed.

Sudarshan too warns Indrani that he won't be able to provide for her. Indrani marries Sudarshan and is tormented at Sudarshan's house by his mother and sisters in law because of several emotional strains at play. To avoid further complications at home, Indrani gets a job as a teacher in Dinajpur.

Their relationship between the newly married couple becomes complicated due to miscommunication or lack of communication between themselves, conflicting egos, misunderstandings and external elements adding fuel to the fire in an already charged emotional environment. One day, after a heated exchange between two people that started their journey fiercely loving and trusting one another, Sudarshan leaves Indrani and goes in search of a job elsewhere.

He there meets a retired teacher (Chhabi Biswas) with a dream of making a change in the lives of have-nots. They understand one another's aspirations and dream and team up to make a change by working in a remote village and improving its irrigation system by digging canal from a nearby river. News about his work and devotion gets published and he becomes famous.

Indrani is delighted to see the talent realized she always knew existed in Sudarshan (which is perhaps one of the reasons she fell in love with him) and leaves everything, even her successful position at Dinajpur to join him, her love of life. Sudarshan, however, was still sore at the hurt he thought he received due to Indrani, and was slightly reluctant to accept her in his life again. It then took an accident of fire for both of them to realise how much they loved one another and how much they cared for each other.

== Cast ==
- Uttam Kumar as Sudarshan Dutta
- Suchitra Sen as Indrani Mukherjee
- Namita Sinha as Indrani's roommate at hostel
- Chhabi Biswas
- Tulsi Chakraborty
- Jiben Bose
- Shyam Laha
- Tarun Kumar Chatterjee
- Gangapada Basu
- Chandrabati Devi as Sudarshan Dutta's mother
- Gita Dey as Sudarshan's second sister-in-law

== Production ==
During the recording of the songs, composer Nachiketa Ghosh decided that he will include a Hindi song in the film, which he wished to be sung by Mohammed Rafi. The idea seemed improbable at first because nobody was sure whether Rafi was going to sing in a Bengali film.

Eventually Hemanta Mukherjee took the responsibility as he was already a big name in Bombay. He took Nachiketa to Rafi's house, who liked the tune instantly upon listening to it. But when he heard that only a maximum of five hundred rupees was possible for the playback, he hesitated. As Mukherjee and Ghosh were about to leave empty-handed, Rafi called them back and declared that he will render the song for free.

== Soundtrack ==
Indrani

Soundtrack album by Nachiketa Ghosh
- Released: 1958
- Length: 22:08
- Label: Angel Digital Pvt Ltd
- Producer: Harindranath Chatterjee

Nachiketa Ghosh chronology
Harishchandra (1957)	Indrani (1958)	Banu Pelo Lottery (1958)

All lyrics are written by Gouri Prasanna Majumdar; all music is composed by Nachiketa Ghosh.

song title
No.	Title	singer(s)	Length
1.	"Surya Dobar Pala"	Hemanta Mukherjee	3:06
2.	"Neer Choto Khoti Nei"	Hemanta Mukherjee and Geeta Dutt	3:20
3.	"Durer Tumu Aaj"	Geeta Dutt	3:25
4.	"Bhangre Bhangre Bhang"	Hemanta Mukherjee	3:03
5.	"Jhanak Jhanak Kanak Knakon Baje"	Geeta Dutt	2:40
6.	"Sabh Kuch Lutakar"	Mohammed Rafi	3:37
7.	"Ogo Sundar Jano Naki"	Geeta Dutt	2:57
Total length:			: 22:08

== Reception ==
The Times Of India wrote "It’s a film much ahead of its time breaking the stereotypes at that time. It’s one of the very few early films in Indian cinema that dealt with the ramifications of a husband-wife relationship where the wife becomes successful and the husband fails to succeed in life".
