= Shap Mochan =

1955 Indian Bengali film

- Shap Mochan
- Directed by: Sudhir Mukherjee
- Written by: Falguni Mukhopadhyay
- Screenplay by: Nripendrakrishna Chatterjee (Dialogues)
- Based on: Shapmocham; 1955 Story by Falguni Mukhopadhyay
- Produced by: Sudhir Mukherjee
- Starring: Uttam Kumar; Suchitra Sen
- Cinematography: Deoji Bhai
- Edited by: Baidyanath Chatterjee
- Music by: Hemanta Mukherjee; Lyricist - Poet Bimal Chandra Ghosh
- Production company: Production Syndicate
- Distributed by: Mehta Pictures
- Release date: 27 May 1955
- Running time: 172 minutes
- Country: India
- Language: Bengali

Shap Mochan is a Bengali-language musical romance film directed and produced by Sudhir Mukherjee based on a novel Shapmochan of Falguni Mukhopadhyay. This film was released in 1955 under the banner of Production Syndicate starring Uttam Kumar and Suchitra Sen in lead. Music director of the film was Hemanta Kumar Mukhopadhyay.

== Plot ==
Young Mahendra belongs to a family of musicians, but once the family is cursed by their teacher. Mahendra's elder brother becomes blind and to avoid the same fate he goes to Kolkata and lives in the house of his father's friend Umeshchandra. He gets romantically involved with Umeshchandra's daughter Madhuri. Madhuri tries to make Mahendra modern and pursue his musical career. In spite of having good singing ability, Mahendra refuses to accept this due to his family values. He leaves their home and takes shelter in Kolkata. But the curse strikes him also and he falls seriously ill.

== Cast ==
- Uttam Kumar as Mahendra
- Suchitra Sen as Madhuri
- Pahari Sanyal as Debendra
- Kamal Mitra as Umeshchandra
- Bikash Roy
- Jiben Bose
- Amar Mullick
- Tulsi Chakraborty
- Gangapada Basu
- Suprobha Devi
- Tapati Ghosh

== Production ==
At first director Sudhir Mukherjee wanted to Sachin Dev Barman as music director for the film but Barman rejected the offer to give time from his busy schedule. Then Hemanta Mukherjee who is in Mumbai that time he wanted to return to Kolkata showing any reason when he heard this news he immediately meet to Sudhir Mukherjee and signed for the film. This is marked beginning of Uttam Kumar Hemanta Kumar duo, but many people said this not the first time that Hemanta sing on Uttam's leap. They first worked in Sahajatri in 1951. But there is no footage available of Sahajatri. So Shapmochon officially recognized as their beginning.

== Soundtrack ==
Shapmochon

Soundtrack album by Hemanta Mukherjee
- Released: 1955
- Recorded: 1954
- Studio: Production Syndicate
- Length: 0:20:00
- Label: Sa Re Ga Ma Pa
- Producer: Sudhir Mukheejee

Hemanta Mukherjee chronology
Swapno O Samadhi (1952)	Shapmochon (1955)	Surya Mukhi (1956)

The songs become very popular. Hemanta Mukherjee was the music director of the movie and composed tunes for the songs. Lyrics were written by Bimal Ghosh (as Kavi Bimal Chandra Ghosh).

All lyrics are written by Poet Bimal Chandra Ghosh; all music is composed by Hemanta Mukherjee.

Songs
No.	Title	Playback	Length
1.	"Tribeni Tirthapathe Ke Gahilo Gaan"	Pratima Banerjee, Chinmoy Lahiri	2:50
2.	"Shono Bandhu Shono"	Hemanta Mukherjee	2:31
3.	"Surer Aakashe Tumi Je Go"	Hemanta Mukherjee	2:54
4.	"Jhar Uthechhe Baul Batas"	Hemanta Mukherjee	3:17
5.	"Kaliyan Sang Karat Rang Raliyan"	D.V.Paluskar	5:01
6.	"Bose Achhi Path Cheye"	Hemanta Mukherjee	3:27
Total length:			20:00

== Reception ==
The film became a blockbuster hit and ran near 100 days in theater. The songs become popular and contributed a lot to the film's success. After the film, The Uttam-Hemanta combination became iconic and hugely successful and regarded as the most popular singer-actor duo in the history of Bengali Cinema.
