= Dwijen Mukhopadhyay =

- Born: 12 November 1927; Calcutta, Bengal Presidency, British India
- Origin: India
- Died: 24 December 2018 (aged 91) Kolkata, West Bengal, India
- Genre: Bengali
- Occupations: Composer, singer

Dwijen Mukhopadhyay (12 November 1927 – 24 December 2018) was an Indian composer and singer whose musical career spanned six decades. He was a performer of Rabindrasangeet, Bengali basic songs, Bengali and Hindi film songs. He recorded more than 1500 songs, including some 800 songs of Rabindranath Tagore. He also composed music for Bengali feature films and for popular Bengali basic songs.He was loosely called Second Hemanta

== Early days ==
In 1944 Mukhopadhyay made his debut as a professional singer. In 1945 he made his first recording of basic Bengali songs from Megaphone Record Company. In 1946 he started to act as an artist of All India Radio (AIR) and also started recording with His Master's Voice-Colombia Recording Company. In 1956 he entertained the soldiers of the Indian Army with his songs at Ladakh.

Mukhopadhyay received his training in music from singers of Bengal including Shri Sushanto Lahiri, Pankaj Mullick, Santidev Ghosh, Santosh Sengupta, Anadi Ghosh Dastidar and Niharbindu Sen.

== Career as musician ==
Mukhopadhyay was introduced to the folk music of Bengal and Hindi film music by the film-music composer Salil Chowdhury. His friendship with Salil Chowdhury started in the late '40s through their common association with IPTA. The duo gave the Bengali audience songs like "Shyamal Barani Ogo Konya", "Klanti Name Go", "Ekdin Phire Jabo Chole", "Pallabini Go Sancharini" and many others. They worked on two poems of Michael Madhusudan Dutt, "Rekho Maa Dashere Mone" and Ashar Cholone Bhuli". Later Mukhopadhyay went to Mumbai to work with Salil Chowdhury and recorded duet songs with Lata Mangeshkar for Hindi films like 'Honeymoon' (1960), 'Maayaa' (1961), 'Sapan Suhaane' (1961) and solo playback in 'Madhumati' (This song did not find place in the film, but was released on LP).

He was an exponent of Rabindrasangeet which he has performed Rabindrasangeet in Bengali films like 'Kshudita Pashan' (1960), based on a short story by Rabindranath Tagore, and 'Sandhya Raag' (1977) under Music Directors Ustad Ali Akbar Khan and Pandit Ravi Shankar, respectively, as well as Rabindrasangeet in 'Kancher Swarga' (1963), Bon Palashir Padabali (1973), and 'Wheel Chair' (1994).

Mukhopadhyay had also performed the devotional song 'Jaago Durga' as a part of the musical play 'Mahisasura Mardini' (The Annihilation of the Demon), which is a radio programme broadcast by All India Radio (AIR), Kolkata, every year on the day of 'Mahalaya' marking the beginning of the autumn festival of 'Durga Puja'.

He sang before dignitaries such as Josip Broz Tito (President of Yugoslavia), Sarvepalli Radhakrishnan (President of India), Pandit Jawaharlal Nehru (Prime Minister of India), Indira Gandhi (Prime Minister of India). As a member of 'Indian Cultural Delegation', he toured the Soviet Union and East European countries like Poland, Romania, Czechoslovakia, Bulgaria, and Yugoslavia. He also was invited to perform in the US, the UK, France, Switzerland, Australia, Canada, Singapore and Bangladesh.

== Affiliations ==
Mukhopadhyay was a member of the "Experts Committee" and the "Selections Committee" at Visva-Bharati Music Board in Kolkata, which was responsible for certifying the purity and authenticity of Tagore songs, sung by any artist anywhere in the world. He was a member of the 'Expert Committee' of All India Radio (AIR), New Delhi that held a national level audition of senior singers to promote them to 'Top grade Artists (Singers)' of India. Mukhopadhyay was the 'External Examiner' of the Post Graduate Course in Visva Bharati University, Shantiniketan, West Bengal, India.

He created a cultural organisation named 'Uttarayani', Kolkata, India to impart training on Rabindrasangeet. Mukhopadhyay was also the President of 'Bani Chakra College of Music', Kolkata, India. He also celebrated the Birth Centenary of Rabindranath Tagore in 1961 and took active part in the celebration of the 150th Birth Anniversary held in 2011.

== Awards ==
Year	Award
1974	Bengal Film Journalists' Association – Best Male Playback Award (Bengali Film: Ban Palashir Padabali)
1982	Debabrata Biswas Memorial Award (Lifetime Achievement)
1991	Indira Gandhi Award
1992	Rajiv Gandhi Award
1994	His Master's Voice Golden Disc (On 50th year of his musical career)
1997	Indian Independence Day Golden Jubilee Award
2002	Uttam Kumar Award (Lifetime Achievement)
2003	Ananda Sangeet Puroskar (Lifetime Achievement) From – ABP (Anandabazar Patrika)
2006	Mother Teresa Millennium Award
2007	S. D. Burman Award
2007	Pracheen Kala Kendra Award, Chandigarh
2010	Reliance Big FM Award (Lifetime Achievement)
2010	Banga Bandhu Award from Bangladesh
2010	D. Lit (Hony.) by Kalyani University, West Bengal
2010	Sangeet Natak Akademi Puraskar
2010	Padma Bhushan
2011	Banga Bibhushan
