= Uttam Kumar filmography =

Uttam Kumar debuted as Arun Kumar Chatterjee, in the 1948 film Drishtidaan directed by Nitin Bose. The next year he appeared as a leading hero Uttam Chatterjee in the film Kamona 1949 which was also unsuccessful. In 1951 film Sahajatri he kept his name permanently as Uttam Kumar. But he gave back to back seven flop films and was stated as flop master general.

His first success was the 1952 film Basu Paribar directed by Nirmal Dey. Next year along with ttsame director, he worked with Suchitra Sen for the first time in Sharey Chuattor. The film became blockbuster and established him. He got his break in the 1954 film Agnipariksha of Agradoot's direction. He also playbacked in his film Nabajanma (1956). He produced six very successful Bengali films from where he received four National Film Award. He also got success as director and composer. He directed three hit films like Sudhu Ekti Bachor, Bon Polashir Padabali and Kalankini Kankabati and composed superhit Kal Tumi Aleya.

In 1966, he collaborated with the Oscar-winning director Satyajit Ray on Nayak, which contributed to his wider recognition. The film is regarded as one of the notable works of his career and of Bengali cinema. He appeared in 203 released films. His final leading role was in Plot No. 5 (1981), released posthumously, in which he portrayed a serial killer confined to a wheelchair. The film also featured actors including Amjad Khan, Amol Palekar, Vidya Sinha, and Sriram Lagoo. He received the BFJA Best Actor Award eight times. He was also among the early recipients of the National Film Award for Best Actor, which he won for his performances in Antony Firingee and Chiriyakhana (1967).

== Films ==
Year	Title	Role	Notes	Ref.
1948	Drishtidan	young Avinash	Acting debut; credited as Arun Kumar Chattopadhyay	
1949	Kamona	Ajay	First film in a leading role; credited as Uttam Chattopadhyay	
1950	Maryada	Naru	Credited as Arup Kumar	
1951	Ore Jatri			
1951	Sahajatri		Credited as Uttam Kumar	
1951	Nastaneer	Amal		
1952	Sanjibani	Ravi		
1952	Basu Paribar	Sukhen Basu		
1952	Kar Pape	Shankar		
1953	Sharey Chuattor	Rampreeti	First film opposite Suchitra Sen	
1953	Lakh Taka	Fakkaram (Fakka)		
1953	Nabin Jatra			
1953	Bou Thakuranir Haat	Uday		
1954	Moner Mayur	Vinay		
1954	Ora Thake Odhare	Chanchal		
1954	Champadangar Bou	Mahatap		
1954	Kalyani			
1954	Maraner Pare	Dr. Ashok		
1954	Sadanander Mela	Ajit		
1954	Annapurnar Mandir	Vishweshwar		
1954	Agni Pariksha	Kiriti Mukherjee (Bulu) (Note: Kumar played a single character with different names.)		
1954	Bakul			
1954	Grihapravesh	Prithwish		
1954	Mantra Shakti	Ambarnath		
1955	Saajher Pradip	Sumant		
1955	Anupama	Avni	25th film	
1955	Raikamal	Ranjan		
1955	Debatra	Arun		
1955	Shap Mochan	Mahendra		
1955	Bidhilipi	Satikant		
1955	Hrad	Banibrat	BFJA Award for Best Actor	
1955	Kankabatir Ghat	Prabir		
1955	Upahar	Ashok Sarkar		
1955	Bratacharini	Vijay		
1955	Raat Bhore	Prabhat		
1955	Sabar Uparey	Shankar Chatterjee		
1956	Sagarika	Arun		
1956	Saheb Bibi Golam	Atulya Chakraborty (Bhootnath)		
1956	Laksha-Hira	Subhadra		
1956	Chirakumar Sabha	Purna		
1956	Ekti Raat	Sushobhan Dutt		
1956	Shankar Narayan Bank			
1956	Shyamali	Anil		
1956	Trijama	Kushal		
1956	Putrabadhu	Dilip		
1956	Shilpi	Dhiman		
1956	Nabajanma	Gaurang		
1957	Haar Jeet	Rajat		
1957	Bardidi	Suren		
1957	Jatra Holo Shuru	Asit		
1957	Prithibi Amare Chaay	Tapas	50th film	
1957	Tasher Ghar	Ajay Mitra & Binay Dutta (Note: Kumar performed dual roles in the film.)	First film in dual roles	
1957	Surer Parashey			
1957	Punarmilan	Ramesh		
1957	Harano Sur	Aloke Mukherjee		
1957	Abhayer Biye	Abhay		
1957	Chandranath	Chandranath		
1957	Pathey Holo Deri	Jayant		
1957	Jiban Trishna	Rajnath Samanta		
1958	Bandhu	Sudip		
1958	Rajlakshmi O Shrikant	Shrikant		
1958	Manmoyee Girls' School	Manas		
1958	Daktar Babu			
1958	Shikar			
1958	Indrani	Sudarshan Dutt		
1958	Joutuk	Upen Ganguly		
1958	Surya Toran	Somnath Mukherjee		
1959	Marutirtha Hinglaj	Thirumal		
1959	Chaowa Paowa	Rajat Sen		
1959	Bicharak	Gyanendra Ghoshal		
1959	Pushpadhanu	Shantanu		
1959	Gali Thekey Rajpath	Rajen (Raja)		
1959	Khelaghar	Shantanu / Goutam		
1959	Sonar Harin	Jayant Chowdhury		
1959	Abak Prithibi	Arjun Bhattacharya	75th film	
1960	Maya Mriga	Mahim		
1960	Raja Saja	Rajat		
1960	Kuhak	Sunand Chowdhury		
1960	Uttar Megh	Alok		
1960	Haat Baralei Bandhu	Pratap		
1960	Khokababur Pratyabartan	Raicharan		
1960	Sakher Chor	Indranath		
1960	Shaharer Itikatha	Nikhilesh		
1960	Shuno Baranari	Himadri		
1961	Sathi Hara	Kundan		
1961	Agni Sanskar	Rajat		
1961	Jhinder Bondi	Kali Shankar Rai, Shankar Singh & Gauri Shankar Rai (Note: Kumar performed triple roles in the film.)	Triple role	
1961	Necklace	Ashok		
1961	Dui Bhai	Utpal		
1961	Saptapadi	Krishnendu Mukherjee	BFJA Award for Best Actor	
1962	Bipasha	Divyendu Chatterjee		
1962	Shiulibari	Bijan (Biju)		
1962	Kanna			
1962	Amar Desh	Satyabrata	Short film	
1963	Shes Anko	Shudhangshu Gupta		
1963	Nisithe	Dakshina Ranjan		
1963	Uttarayan	Prabir Chatterjee & Ratneshwar Bhattacharya (Rattan)	Double role	
1963	Bhranti Bilas	Chiranjiv Chowdhury & Chiranjit Chowdhury	Double role	
1963	Deya Neya	Prashant Kumar Roy alias Abhijit Chowdhury alias Hriday Haran Roy	100th film	
1963	Surya Sikha	Dipto Roy		
1964	Bibhas	Bibhas		
1964	Jatugriha	Shatadal Dutt		
1964	Natun Tirtha	Ayan		
1964	Momer Alo	Dr. Surjit Sen		
1964	Lal Pathore	Hemadakanta Rai alias Kumar Bahadur		
1965	Thana Theke Aaschhi	Tinkari Halder		
1965	Rajkanya	Jayant		
1965	Surya Tapa	Deependra		
1966	Rajodrohi	Pratap		
1966	Shudhu Ekti Bachhar	Sanjay		
1966	Nayak	Arindam Mukherjee	BFJA Award for Best Actor	
1966	Shankha Bela	Sunil		
1966	Kal Tumi Aleya	Dhirupad Chakraborty		
1967	Chhoti Si Mulaqat	Ashok	Hindi film debut	
1967	Nayika Sangbad	Alok		
1967	Jiban Mrityu	Ashok Mukherjee / Shanta Prasad Singh		
1967	Grihadaha	Mahim	BFJA Award for Best Actor	
1967	Chiriyakhana	Byomkesh Bakshi	National Film Award for Best Actor	
1967	Antony Firingee	Hansman Anthony alias Antony Firingee	National Film Award for Best Actor	
1968	Chowringhee	Satya Sundar Bose (Satta)		
1968	Teen Adhyay	Banibrata		
1968	Gar Nasimpur	Mir Jumla II		
1968	Kokhono Megh	Ashok Mukherjee alias Narayan Chowdhury (fake)		
1969	Sabarmati	Shankar	125th film	
1969	Chirodiner	Tapas		
1969	Shuk Shari	Nani		
1969	Kamallata	Shrikant		
1969	Mon Niye	Amitabh		
1969	Aparichita	Ranjan		
1970	Kalankita Nayak	Indrajit		
1970	Bilambita Loy	Mrigank		
1970	Duti Mon	Tapas, Rudra		
1970	Rajkumari	Nirmal Chowdhury / Indrajit		
1970	Nishi Padma	Anang Dutt		
1970	Manjari Opera	Gora		
1971	Ekhane Pinjar	Amal Bose	BFJA Award for Best Actor	
1971	Nabaraag	Vipul		
1971	Dhanyee Meye	Kaligati Dutta		
1971	Jay Jayanti	Sanjay Roy		
1971	Jiban Jigyasha	Indanil		
1971	Chhadmabeshi	Avanish Mitra alias Gourhari Basu alias Pundarikaksha Purakayasta		
1972	Biraj Bou	Nilambar		
1972	Alo Amar Alo	Nilendra Mitra		
1972	Andha Atit	Nirmalendu		
1972	Stree	Madhav Dutt	BFJA Award for Best Actor	
1972	Mem Saheb	Amit		
1972	Chhinnapatra	Ashish / Pradeep		
1972	Har Mana Har	Vinay (Vinu)		
1973	Nakal Sona	Himself	Cameo appearance	
1973	Bon Palashir Padabali	Udas	150th film	
1973	Kayahiner Kahini	Shantanu Roy & Prabir Majumder	Double role	
1973	Raater Rajanigandha	Raja Banerjee		
1973	Sonar Khancha	Jayant		
1973	Roudro Chhaya	Raja / Pyarelal / Ustad		
1974	Alor Thikana			
1974	Rawkto Tilak	ACP R. D. Chowdhury		
1974	Jadi Jantem	P. K. Basu		
1974	Jadu Bansha	Ganapati / Gana Da		
1974	Rodon Bhora Basanta	Somnath Bose		
1974	Bikele Bhorer Phool	Anish Mitra		
1974	Amanush	Madhusudan Roy Chowdhury (Madhu)	Simultaneously shot in Hindi under the same title Nominated—Filmfare Award for Best Actor; Also Filmfare Awards East for Best Actor; Filmfare Special Award and BFJA Award for Best Actor	
1975	Mouchak	Nitish Roy		
1975	Ami, Shey O Shakha	Adhir Roy & Sudhir Roy	Double role	
1975	Agnishwar	Dr. Agnishwar Mukherjee		
1975	Nagar Darparne	Anupam		
1975	Kajallata			
1975	Priyo Bandhabi	Jahar		
1975	Sanyasi Raja	Raja Suryak Kishore Nag Chowdhury (Sanyasi)		
1975	Bagh Bondi Khela	Bhavesh Banerjee		
1976	Hotel Snow Fox	K. K.		
1976	Anandamela	Sharad Charan Banerjee		
1976	Mombati	Swaroop		
1976	Sei Chokh	Navkrishna		
1976	Nidhiram Sardar	Ramprasad Sinha / Nidhiram Sardar	175th film	
1976	Banhishikha	Bilash Ghosh / Mr. Sinha	BFJA Award for Best Actor	
1976	Chander Kachhakaachhi	Chandanath		
1977	Rajbansha	Bhairav Narayan Sinha alias Raja Bahadur & Pratap Narayan Sinha alias Kumar Bahadur		
1977	Sabyasachi	Sabyasachi Mallick / Girish Mahapatra	Double role	
1977	Asadharan	Jagabandhu		
1977	Bhola Moira	Bhola Moyra		
1977	Sister	Major	Guest appearance	
1977	Jaal Sannyasi			
1977	Ananda Ashram	Amaresh Roy Chowdhury	Bilingual film; Simultaneously shot in Hindi as Anand Ashram	
1977	Kitaab	Nikhil Gupta	Hindi film	
1978	Dui Purush	Nutul Bihari Mukherjee		
1978	Bandie	Bhola & Yuvraj Uday B. Singh	Double role; Bilingual film; Simultaneously shot in Hindi	
1978	Nishan	Vikram & Vijay	Double role; Bilingual film; Simultaneously shot in Hindi	
1978	Dhanraj Tamang	Dhanraj Tamang	Filmfare Awards East for Best Actor	
1979	Brojobuli	Brojoraj Karforma (Brojo)		
1979	Devdas	Chunnilal (Chunni)		
1979	Dooriyaan	Kailash	Hindi film	
1979	Sunayani			
1979	Naba Diganta			
1979	Shrikanter Will	Shrikant Mahalonobis		
1979	Samadhan	Ajay		
1980	Pankhiraj	George D' Souza		
1980	Rajnandini	Gyanendra		
1980	Aro Ekjan	Dilip Sinha		
1980	Darpachurna		200th film	
1980	Dui Prithibi	Mrinal Dutt		
1980	Raja Saheb	Raja Saheb		
1981	Plot No. 5	Sanjay Mehra	Hindi film	
1981	Ogo Bodhu Shundori	Gagan Sen	Posthumous release	
1981	Khana Baraha	Varāhamihira	Posthumous release	
1981	Pratishodh	Haren Chatterjee	Posthumous release	
1981	Surya Sakkhi		Posthumous release	
1981	Kalankini Kankabati	Raj Shekhar Rai	Posthumous release	
1982	Desh Premee	Ghosh	Hindi film; Posthumous release	
1982	Iman Kalyan		Posthumous release	
1987	Mera Karam Mera Dharam	Devi Prasad	Hindi film; Posthumous release	
2024	Oti Uttam	Himself	212th film; appearances through archived footages from his films	

== As producer ==
No	Year	Movie	Director	Co-stars	Music Director	Banner	Role
1	1957	Harano Sur	Ajoy Kar	Suchitra Sen, Utpal Dutta	Hemanta Mukherjee	Alochaya Productions Private Limited	Alok Mukherjee
2	1961	Saptapadi	Ajoy Kar	Suchitra Sen, Chabi Biswas, Tarun Kumar, Tulsi Chakraborty	Hemanta Mukherjee	Alochaya Productions Private Limited	Krishnendu
3	1963	Bhranti Bilash	Manu Sen	Bhanu Banerjee, Sabitri Chatterjee, Sandhya Ray	Shyamal Mitra	Uttam Kumar Films Private Limited	Chiranjit and Chiranjiv (Double role)
4	1963	Uttar Falguni	Asit Sen	Suchitra Sen, Bikash Roy	Robin Chatterjee Uttam Kumar Films Private Limited	Uttam Kumar Films Private Limited	Only as producer
5	1964	Jatugriha	Tapan Sinha	Arudhati Devi, Anil Chatterjee	Ashish Khan	Uttam Kumar Films Private Limited	Shatadal
6	1967	Chhoti Si Mulaqat	Alo Sarkar	Vyjainthimala, Rajendranath	Shankar-Jaikishan	Our Movies	Ashok
7	1967	Grihadaha	Subodh Mitra	Suchitra Sen, Pradeep Kumar, Sabitri Chatterjee	Robin Chatterjee	Uttam Kumar Films Private Limited	Mahim
8	1973	Bon Palashir Padabali	Uttam Kumar	Supriya Devi, Madhabi Mukherjee, Bikash Roy, Basabi Nandi, Jahar Ganguly	Shyamal Mitra	Shilpi Sangshad	Udashi
9	1980	Dui Prithibi	Pijush Bose	Supriya Devi, Victor Banerjee, Ranjit Mallick	Ananda Shankar	Shilpi Sangshad	Mrinal Dutta

== As director and screenwriter ==
No	Year	Movie	Director	Co-stars	Music Director	Banner	Role
1	1966	Shudhu Ekti Bachhar	Uttam Kumar	Supriya Devi, Tarun Kumar	Robin Chatterjee	Chayachabi Pratisthan	Sanjoy
2	1973	Bon Palashir Padabali	Uttam Kumar	Supriya Devi, Madhabi Mukherjee, Bikash Roy, Basabi Nandi, Jahar Ganguly	Shyamal Mitra	Shilpi Sangshad	Udashi (As background scorer also)
3	1981	Kalankini Kankabati	Uttam Kumar, Pijush Bose	Sharmila Tagore, Mithun Chakraborty, Supriya Devi	R.D Barman	Subrato Mukhopadhyay	Raj Shekhar Rai

== As playback singer and composer ==
No	Year	Movie	Director	Co-stars	Music Director	Banner	Role
1	1956	Nabajanma	Debaki Bose	Sabitri Chatterjee, Kanu Banerjee, Arundhati Devi	Nachiketa Ghosh	Deluxe Films	Gouranga (as playback singer
2	1966	Kal Tumi Aleya	Sachin Mukherjee	Supriya Devi, Tarun Kumar, Sabitri Chatterjee, Sumita Sanyal, Kamal Mitra	Uttam Kumar	Sree Loknath Chitram	Dhirapada Chakraborty (As composer)
3	1977	Sabyasachi	Pijush Bose	Supriya Devi, Anil Chatterjee	Uttam Kumar, Rabindranath Tagore, Kaji Najrul Islam, Dwijendralal Ray	Usha Films	Sabyasachi (As composer)
