= Robin Chatterjee discography =

Robin Chatterjee was an Indian music director. He has composed music for 52 films among which 39 are in Bengali, 12 in Hindi and 1 film was made in both Hindi and Bengali versions. He also composed background score for 22 films, all are Hindi. The following is a list of films he scored:

== 1940s ==
Year	Film	Notes
1942	Abhayer Biye	debut film
1943	Somadhan	
1945	Path Bendhe Dilo	
1945	Raaj Laxmi	Hindi film
1946	Tum Aur Main	Hindi film
1947	Swapno O Sadhona	
1948	Anirban	
1948	Samapika	
1948	Sabyasachi	Hindi film
1949	Abhijatyo	
1949	Sankalpo	

== 1950s ==
Year	Film	Notes
1950	Banprastha	
1951	Ratnadeep	Hindi film
1951	Subhadra	Bengali/Hindi (bilingual film)
1953	Vidyasagar	Hindi film
1953	Firdaus	Hindi film
1953	Pehli Shaadi	Hindi film
1954	Africa	Hindi film
1954	Majboori	Hindi film
1954	Shobha	Hindi film
1955	Godhuli	
1955	Sabar Upare	
1956	Dhake Ki Malmal	Hindi film
1956	Sagarika	
1956	Saheb Bibi Golam	
1957	Abhoyer Biye	
1957	Harjit	
1957	Pathey Holo Deri	
1958	Tansen	
1959	Laloo Bhuloo	

== 1960s ==
Year	Film	Notes
1960	Shohorer Itikotha	
1960	Smritituku Thak	
1960	Shuno Baranari	
1962	Bipasha	
1963	Surya Sikha	
1963	Uttar Falguni	
1963	Uttarayan	
1964	Ke Tumi	
1964	Momer Alo	
1966	Shudhu Ekti Bachhar	
1967	Grihadaha	
1968	Boudi	
1969	Aparachita	
1969	Arogya Niketan	
1969	Kamallata	

== 1970s ==
Year	Film	Notes
1971	Aparna	
1971	Duranta Joy	
1971	Khunje Berai	
1972	Nayikar Bhumikai	
1973	Chimni Ka Dhunva	Hindi film
1976	Chander Kachhakachhi	

== 1980s ==
Year	Film	Notes
1981	Pratishodh	
1987	Debika	

== Background Scores Only ==
Year	Film	Language	Composer(s)
1965	Aarzoo	Hindi	Shankar–Jaikishan
1965	Jab Jab Phool Khile	Hindi	Kalyanji–Anandji
1966	Sawan Ki Ghata	Hindi	O. P. Nayyar
1967	Hare Kanch Ki Chooriyan	Hindi	
1967	Mohabbat Zindagi Hai	Hindi	O. P. Nayyar
1968	Anokhi Raat	Hindi	
1969	Mahal	Hindi	
1969	Tumse Achha Kaun Hai	Hindi	
1974	Garm Hava	Hindi	
1974	Do Phool	Hindi	
1975	Amanush	Hindi	
1975	Julie	Hindi	Rajesh Roshan
1975	Nishant	Hindi	
1976	Sabse Bada Rupaiya	Hindi	
1976	Udhar Ka Sindur	Hindi	
1976	Zindagi	Hindi	
1977	Jay Vijay	Hindi	
1977	Yehi Hai Zindagi	Hindi	
1980	Yeh Kaisa insaaf?	Hindi	
1981	Ek Duuje Ke Liye	Hindi	Laxmikant–Pyarelal
1986	Amrit	Hindi	
1986	Swati	Hindi	
