= Uttarayan (1963 film) =

1963 Bengali war drama film by Agradoot

- Theatrical poster
- Directed by: Agradoot
- Based on: Uttarayan (story) by Tarashankar Bandyopadhyay; Hum Dono (Hindi film) by Amar Jeet
- Screenplay by: Agradoot
- Story by: Tarashankar Bandyopadhyay
- Produced by: Parashmal Bhuteria; Deepchand Kankariya
- Starring: Uttam Kumar; Supriya Devi; Sabitri Chatterjee; Anil Chatterjee
- Cinematography: Bibhuti Laha; Bijoy Ghosh
- Edited by: Baidyanath Chatterjee
- Music by: Robin Chatterjee
- Production company: Parashmal–Deepchand Ventures Pvt. Ltd.
- Distributed by: Deluxe Film Distributors
- Release date: 24 April 1963
- Running time: 133 minutes
- Country: India
- Language: Bengali

Uttarayan (Bengali pronunciation: [ut̪ːɔrajaɳ]) is a 1963 Indian Bengali-language war drama film co-written and directed by Agradoot. Produced by Parashmal Bhuteria and Deepchand Kankariya under the banner of Parashmal–Deepchand Ventures, the film is based Tarashankar Bandyopadhyay's short story of the same name and is also heavily inspired by its Hindi screen adaptation Hum Dono (1961) starring Dev Anand. The film stars Uttam Kumar in dual roles, alongside Supriya Devi, Sabitri Chatterjee and Anil Chatterjee in another pivotal roles.

Tarashankar Bandyopadhyay, the author of the original story, wrote the dialogues for the film. Set against the backdrop of World War II, it follows a soldier who decides to visit the family of his dead soldier to inform about his death, but the family mistake him as they resembled each other. Music of the film is composed by Robin Chatterjee, with lyrics by Shailen Roy. Bibhuti Laha and Bijoy Ghosh handled its cinematography, while Baidyanath Chatterjee edited the film.

Uttarayan was theatrically released on 24 April 1963, opening to positive response. Running for over 150 days in theatres, the film received praise for its story, cinematography and the notable performances by Kumar in dual roles, also attaining a cult status generally. It was remade into Telugu as Ramuni Minchina Ramudu in 1975 starring N. T. Rama Rao.

== Cast ==
- Uttam Kumar in dual roles
  - Capt. Prabir Chatterjee, a member of Unit Type Code
  - Havildar Ratneshwar "Ratan" Bhattacharya, Prabir's look alike
- Supriya Devi as Arati "Rati"
- Sabitri Chatterjee as Shati (formerly known as Sita), Ratan's wife
- Anil Chatterjee as Arun Bose
- Pahari Sanyal as Amrita Sen
- Dhiraj Das as Rathin, an engineer and Amrita's son
- Gangapada Basu as Sanat, Amrita's brother-in-law
- Premanshu Basu as Subrata
- Mr. Malcolm as Mr. Agazaki
- Shailen Mukherjee as Latu, Sanat's son
- Gita Dey as Sudha, Latu's wife
- Nibhanani Devi
- Asha Devi
- Ariful Haque

== Production ==
In 1959, Dev Anand had actually read Tarasankar Bandopadhyay's novel Uttarayan and bought the rights from him to make a Hindi film on it, under his home banner Navketan Films. His brother Vijay Anand wrote its screenplay, adapting the original story. Titled as Hum Dono, the film was originally supposed to be directed by Kartik Chatterjee, who had made a big name for himself with Bengali hits like Ramer Sumati, Mahaprasthaner Pathey (Yatrik in Hindi), Saheb Bibi Golam and Chandranath. But Chatterjee left the project after Anand suggested some changes in the screen adaptation of the novel. Bandyopadhyay also left the project and gave his novel's adaptation right to Agradoot. Later, Anad hired Nirmal Sircar to write a modified version of the novel and got on board Amarjeet as director, and made the film in 1961.

In 1962, Uttam Kumar signed to collaborate with Agradoot for the project, who previously delivered two commercially successful films with them for – Agni Sanskar (1961) and Bipasha (1962). Initially, Bibhuti Laha was to produce the film, while later the duo Parashmal–Deepchand came on the board as its producer. The same year, Kumar became appraisal of Anand's perdormance in Hum Dono, after watching the film at Roxy Cinema, Kolkata. When Agradoot instructed him to internalize Anand's performance from the film, Kumar declined to compare his performance in Uttarayan with that of Anand in Hum Dono, as they both had individual acting styles.

== Music ==
Music of the film is composed by Robin Chatterjee in his fifth collaboration with Agradoot after Sabar Uparey (1955), Pathey Holo Deri (1957), Lalu Bhulu (1959) and Bipasha (1962), and in eleventh collaboration with Kumar after Sabar Uparey, Sagarika (1956), Saheb Bibi Golam (1956), Abhayer Biye (1957), Haar Jeet (1957), Pathey Holo Deri, Shaharer Itikatha (1960), Shuno Baranari (1960), Bipasha (1962) and Surya Sikha (1963).

The soundtrack conststs of two tracks, each penned by Shailen Roy. In the title credits of the film, Chatterjee reused the tune of his own composition "E Shudhu Gaaner Din" sung by Sandhya Mukherjee, from the 1957 film Pathey Holo Deri.

Track listing
No.	Title	Singer(s)	Length
1.	"Mahua Bujhi"	Sandhya Mukherjee	4:15
2.	"Ekti Krishna Lakho Gopini"	Pratima Bandopadhyay	3:37
Total length:			7:52

== Remake ==
In 1975, Uttarayan was remade into Telugu as Ramuni Minchina Ramudu, with N. T. Rama Rao playing the dual roles, alongside Vanisri.
