= Geetali Roy =

Indian actress

Gitali Roy
- Born: 1938; Kolkata, Bengal Presidency, India
- Citizenship: Indian
- Occupations: Actress; producer
- Years active: 1961—1978
- Debut: Punashcha (1961)
- Notable work: Charulata; Mahapurush; Baksa Badal; Chiriakhana
- Spouse: Salil Dutta

Gitali Roy was an Indian actress and producer known for her work in Bengali cinema. She made her debut in Mrinal Sen's Bengali drama film Punashcha (1961). She rose to fame for her collaboration with Satyajit Ray in Charulata (1964), Mahapurush (1965) and Chiriakhana (1967).

== Filmography ==
Year	Film	Role	Director	Ref.
1961	Punascha	Lobi	Mrinal Sen	
1961	Dui Bhai			
1962	Shiulibari			
1963	Barnali			
1963	Binimoy			
1963	Mahanagar	Anupam's Wife	Satyajit Ray	
1964	Charulata	Manda	Satyajit Ray	
1965	Baksa Badal	Ratna	Nityananda Datta	
1965	Mahapurush	Buchki	Satyajit Ray	
1965	Rajkanya	Prava	Sunil Bandyopadhyay	
1965	Suryatapa		Agradoot	
1966	Ashru Diye Lekha			
1966	Joradighir Chowdhury Paribar			
1966	Mayabini Lane			
1966	Shesh Tin Din			
1967	Badhubaran			
1967	Chiriyakhana	Banalakshmi	Satyajit Ray	
1967	Grihadaha			
1967	Hathat Dekha			
1967	Prastar Swakshar	Jaya's Mother	Salil Dutta	
1971	Nishachar			
1972	Chhayateer			
1974	Asati			

== Bibliography ==
- Sivaprasad Samaddar (1983). Saradah śatam (in Bengali). Anima Prakasani.
