= Shudhu Ekti Bachhar =

1966 film

Sudhu Ekti Bochor
- Directed by: Uttam Kumar
- Written by: Gauriprasanna Mazumder (along with lyrics)
- Screenplay by: Uttam Kumar
- Story by: Gauriprasanna Mazumder
- Produced by: Salil Dutta
- Starring: Uttam Kumar; Supriya Devi
- Cinematography: Bijoy Ghosh
- Edited by: Baidyanath Chatterjee
- Music by: Robin Chatterjee
- Production company: Chayachabi Pratisthan
- Distributed by: Chandimata Films Private Limited
- Release date: 1 April 1966
- Running time: 135 minutes
- Country: India
- Language: Bengali

Sudhu Ekti Bochor is a 1966 Indian Bengali-language romantic drama film starring Uttam Kumar and Supriya Devi with screenplay directed by Uttam himself. The music was composed by Robin Chatterjee. The story was written by Gauriprasanna Mazumder, who also wrote the lyrics. It is the first film directed by Uttam Kumar.

== Plot ==
A comical situation which finds the Jaya (Supriya) having to marry a complete stranger according to her father's will. The stranger she is to be married is a comedic man she dislikes. They agree to stay married for a year. There are many quarrels, misunderstandings, and fights, which all add to the comicality of the movie. In the end, the two main leads fall in love with each other and live happily ever after.

== Cast ==
- Uttam Kumar as Sanjoy
- Supriya Devi as Jaya
- Jahar Ganguly
- Tarun Kumar as Sanjoy's friend
- Subrata Chattopadhyay
- Amar Mallick as Sanjoy's Uncle

== Soundtrack ==
Sudhu Ekti Bochor

Soundtrack album by Robin Chatterjee
- Released: 1966
- Recorded: 1965
- Studio: Chayachabi Pratisthan
- Genre: Feature Film Soundtrack
- Length: 0:18:43
- Label: Angel Digital Pvt Ltd
- Producer: Salil Dutta

Robin Chatterjee chronology
Momer Alo (1964)	Sudhu Ekti Bochor (1966)	Grihadaha (1967)

All lyrics are written by Gauriprasanna Mazumder; all music is composed by Robin Chatterjee.

Songs
No.	Title	Playback	Length
1.	"Aaha De Supari Alta De"	Sipra Bose	3:14
2.	"Ei Jibaner Rang"	Hemanta Mukherjee	3:10
3.	"Je Amar Mon Niyeche"	Hemanta Mukherjee	2:56
4.	"Mor Milan Piyashi Mon"	Hemanta Mukherjee	3:12
5.	"Srimati Sejeche Abhisar Saje"	Sandhya Mukherjee	3:16
6.	"Swapno Jagano Raat"	Hemanta Mukherjee	2:55
Total length:			18:43

== Reception ==
This was the first film directed by Uttam Kumar, who also wrote the screenplay. The film was a commercial success and ran for nearly 100 days at the box office.
