= Ariful Haque (actor) =

Bangladeshi actor and writer (born 1934)

- আরিফুল হক
- Born: 11 October 1931 (age 94); Howrah District, British India
- Citizenship: Bangladeshi
- Education: Uluberia College; Jadavpur University
- Occupations: Actor and writer

Ariful Haque (born 11 October 1931) is a Bangladeshi actor and writer. His debut in the films was through Uttarayan in 1963, directed by Agradoot. Later he migrated to East Pakistan (present-day Bangladesh) and took part in many films. He has written six books.

== Early and personal life ==
Ariful Haque was born in Hawrah District in India on 11 October 1931. In 2000, he moved to Canada with his wife, to join their son and daughter.

== Career ==
Uttarayan, the first film he acted in, was released in Kolkata in 1963. He moved from Kolkata to Dacca, East Pakistan, in 1964.

== Filmography ==
- Lalon Fakir (1972)
- Surjo Konna (1975)
- Sareng Bou (1978)
- Sundori (1979)
- Ekhoni Somoy (1980)
- Sokhi Tumi Kar (1980)
- Katha Dilam (1991)
- Boro Barir Meye (1982)
- Notun Bou (1983)
- Desh Premik (1994)
- Ghrina (1994)
- Tomake Chai (1996)
- Pita Mata Sontan (1997)
- Sopner Nayak (1997)
- Gohine Shobdo (2010)
- Prem Bishad (2010)

== Books ==
- Sangskritik Agrashon O Protirodh
- Natyakar Nazrul Islam
- Hayadarabad Tragedy O Ajker Bangladesh
- Sonskritir Manchitro
- Desh Somaj Sanskriti O Rajniti
- Hashir Koutuk
