= Surya Sikha =

1963 film by Salil Dutta

- Directed by: Salil Dutta
- Written by: Binoy Chatterjee; Salil Dutta
- Screenplay by: Binoy Chatterjee (Dialogues)
- Story by: Salil Dutta
- Starring: Uttam Kumar; Supriya Debi; Chabi Biswas; Utpal Dutta
- Cinematography: Bijoy Ghosh
- Edited by: Baidyanath Chatterjee
- Music by: Robin Chatterjee; Lyrics - Sailen Roy
- Production company: Chayachabi Pratisthan
- Distributed by: Chandimata Films Pvt Ltd
- Release date: 1963
- Running time: 133 minutes
- Country: India
- Language: Bengali

Surya Sikha (transl. The Sun Flame) is a Bengali romance drama film directed by Salil Dutta. This film was released on 12 July 1963 under the banner of Chhayachhabi Pratisthan. The film stars Uttam Kumar and Supriya Debi in lead roles and Chabi Biswas, Utpal Dutta and others played supporting role.

== Plot ==
Dipto Roy returns to India after completion of FRCS from London. He is extremely committed and dutyfull to his patients. He takes up the responsibility to run a village hospital and makes a lot of changes to the infrastructure which causes serious oppositions to him. Achena, a schoolteacher having nursing training assists him. Dipto and Achena marry but after the marriage Achena becomes more active in housework rather than the hospital which makes Dipto frustrated. Subsequently, they separate and after many years Dipta and Achena meet once again.

== Cast ==
- Uttam Kumar as Dipto
- Supriya Devi as Achena
- Chhabi Biswas
- Utpal Dutt
- Tarun Kumar Chatterjee
- Jahor Roy
- Asit Baran
- Panchanan Bhattacharya
- Arati Das
- Gangapada Basu
- Shailen Mukherjee
- Dhiraj Das
- Parijat Bose

== Soundtrack ==
Surya Sikha

Soundtrack album by Robin Chatterjee
- Released: 1963
- Recorded: 1962
- Studio: Chayachabi Pratisthan
- Genre: Feature Film Soundtrack
- Length: 0:10:37
- Label: Angel Digital Pvt Ltd

Robin Chatterjee chronology
Bipasha (1962)	Surya Sikha (1963)	Uttar Falguni (1963)

All lyrics are written by Sailen Roy; all music is composed by Robin Chatterjee.

Songs
No.	Title	Playback	Length
1.	"Ami Priyare Peyechi"	Hemanta Mukherjee	3:20
2.	"Keno Godhulir Meghe"	Sandhya Mukherjee	3:54
3.	"Ashar Surya Laal Holo"	Sandhya Mukherjee	3:23
Total length:			10:37
