= Abak Prithibi =

1959 film

- অবাক পৃথিবী
- Directed by: Bishu Chakraborty
- Written by: Bishu Chakraborty
- Screenplay by: Bidhayak Bhattacharya (Dialogues)
- Story by: Bidhayak Bhattacharya
- Produced by: Tarun Kumar
- Starring: Uttam Kumar; Tarun Kumar; Sabitri Chatterjee; Tulsi Chakraborty; Ajit Banerjee; Bidhayak Bhattacharya
- Cinematography: Bishu Chakraborty
- Edited by: Baidyanath Chatterjee
- Music by: Amal Mukherjee
- Production company: Goutam Chitram
- Distributed by: Chitra Paribeshak Pvt Ltd
- Release date: 1959
- Running time: 98 min.
- Country: India
- Language: Bengali

Abak Prithibi is a 1959 Bengali film directed by Bishu Chakraborty. This film was produced by Tarun Kumar, who was also a Bengali film actor. This film was written by Bishu Chakraborty. The music was composed by Amal Mukherjee. This is a comedy drama film. The film stars Uttam Kumar in lead and others, while Ajit Bandyopadhyay, Gangapada Basu, Bidhayak Bhattacharya, Swagata Chakraborty, Tulsi Chakraborty, Nripati Chatterjee, Sabitri Chatterjee, Aparna Debi, Tarun Kumar, Priti Majumdar and Bireswar Sen played supporting role. Uttam Kumar played the role of a thief role which was very unique.

== Plot ==
Arjun is a very lonely person. He doesn't know what life is. Every day for him is a struggle. So he becomes a criminal. Jail is a safe custody for him because food is always available in jail. So he tries to return to the place, but all his efforts go in vain, then he travels to a place and meets a father. He is the principal of a missionary residential school. In that place Arjun meets Miss Chaterjee, a teacher. At first she doesn't like him, but shortly she started to realise Arjun's quality. Arjun is also a very good singer, but again for his bad reputation police catch him and send him to jail. In court some students actually support him and thus all the misunderstanding is resolved and the truth prevails.

== Cast ==
- Uttam Kumar
- Ajit Bandyopadhyay
- Gangapada Basu
- Bidhayak Bhattacharya
- Swagata Chakraborty
- Tulsi Chakraborty
- Nripati Chatterjee
- Sabitri Chatterjee
- Aparna Debi
- Tarun Kumar
- Priti Majumdar

== Soundtrack ==
Abak Prithibi

Soundtrack album by Amal Mukherjee
- Released: 1959
- Recorded: 1958
- Studio: Goutam Chitram
- Genre: Feature Film Soundtrack
- Length: 13:18
- Label: Saregama
- Producer: Tarun Kumar

All lyrics are written by Gauriprasanna Mazumder and Pulak Banerjee; all music is composed by Amal Mukherjee.

Songs
No.	Title	Playback	Length
1.	"Ei Punya Prabhate"	Shyamal Mitra	3:36
2.	"Shudhu Andhar Dhu Dhu Andhar"	Hemanta Mukherjee	3:19
3.	"Surpanakhar Naak Kata Jai"	Hemanta Mukherjee	3:10
4.	"Ek Je Chilo Dustu Chele"	Hemanta Mukherjee	3:13
Total length:			13:18
