= Sumita Sanyal =

Indian actress

- Born: Manjula Sanyal; 9 October 1945; Darjiling, British India
- Died: 9 July 2017 (aged 71); Lake Gardens, Kolkata, India
- Occupation: Actress
- Years active: 1960–1996
- Spouse: Subodh Roy
- Relatives: Girija Golkunda Sanyal (father)

Sumita Sanyal (9 October 1935 – 9 July 2017) was an Indian actress who is known for her work in Bengali and Hindi cinema. She made her debut opposite Uttam Kumar in Bibhuti Laha's Khokababur Pratyabartan (1960). She subsequently appeared in a series of Bengali films in the 1960s and 1970s. She also made a cameo appearance in the BBC production The Peacock Spring (1996).

== Early life ==
She was born Manjula Sanyal in Darjeeling, Bengal Presidency, British India. Her father was Girija Golkunda Sanyal.

== Career ==
Director Bibhuti Laha (of Agradoot) named her Suchorita for his film Khokababur Pratyabartan. After that, director Kanak Mukhopadhay decided to make it shorter into Sumita. Famous actress Lila Desai was very much known to Sumita. Lila introduced her to Agradoot. After she got a chance in Khokababur Pratyabartan, she acted in more than 40 films in Bengali, including Sagina Mahato, opposite Dilip Kumar and in the lead role in Kuheli, alongside Biswajit and Sandhya Roy. She also has acted in a number of Hindi films, the most notable of which was Anand in 1971, opposite Amitabh Bachchan. She also acted in television serials, on professional stage and in group theatre with the notable association being "Ranga Sabha". She was a part of many of Hrishikesh Mukherjee's films like Guddi, Anand and Aashirwad.

== Personal life ==
She was married to film editor Subodh Roy. They have a son.

== Filmography ==
=== Bengali films ===
| Year | Title | Role |
|---|---|---|
| 1960 | Khokababur Pratyabartan | Raicharan's wife |
| 1963 | Akashpradip | |
| 1963 | Kanchankanya | |
| 1963 | Deya Neya | Sucharita's Friend |
| 1964 | Kalsrot | |
| 1964 | Swarga Hotey Biday | |
| 1964 | Godhuli Bela | |
| 1964 | Anustup Chhanda | |
| 1965 | Dinanter Alo | |
| 1965 | Pratham Prem | |
| 1965 | Eki Ange Eto Rup | |
| 1965 | Surer Agun | |
| 1965 | Kal Tumi Aleya | |
| 1965 | Trishna | |
| 1966 | Nayak | |
| 1966 | Shesh Tin Din | |
| 1966 | Nutan Jiban | |
| 1966 | Ashru Diye Lekha | |
| 1966 | Harano Prem | |
| 1967 | Hathat Dekha | |
| 1968 | Panchasar | |
| 1968 | Apanjan | |
| 1969 | Chiradiner | |
| 1969 | Chena Achena | |
| 1969 | Teen Bhubaner Pare | |
| 1969 | Maya | |
| 1970 | Sagina Mahato | |
| 1971 | Nishachar | |
| 1971 | Anya Mati Anya Rang | |
| 1971 | Kuheli | |
| 1974 | Natun Surya | |
| 1976 | Jiban Niye | |
| 1987 | Jawab | |
| 1993 | Srimati | |

=== Hindi films ===
| Year | Title | Role |
|---|---|---|
| 1968 | Aashirwad | Neena "Bittu" S. Choudhry |
| 1971 | Anand | Renu Bhaskar Banerjee |
| 1971 | Guddi | Bhabhi |
| 1971 | Mere Apne | Lata |
| 1996 | The Peacock Spring | Woman seated on train (English, BBC) |

=== Bengali TV series ===
| Year | Title | Role | Ref. |
|---|---|---|---|
| | Nibedita Research Laboratory | Ishita Sen | |
| 1989 | Rong Berong | The witch | |
