= Ariful Haque =

Ariful Haque may refer to:

- Ariful Haque (cricketer) (born 1992), Bangladeshi cricketer
- Ariful Haque (actor) (born 1931), Bangladeshi actor and writer
