= Salil Dutta =

Indian filmmaker and screenwriter

- Born: Salil Dutta; 30 November 1931; Kolkata, West Bengal
- Died: 20 September 2004 (aged 72)
- Occupations: Film director, Screenwriter, Actor
- Years active: 1963-2001
- Spouse: Geetali Roy

Salil Dutta (30 November 1931 – 20 September 2004) was an Indian Bengali director, screenwriter and actor. He is well known for his films Surya Sikha (1963), Stree (1972) and Seyi Chokh (1976).

== Career ==
Dutta was born in 1931 in British India. He started his career as assistant director of Trijama in 1956 and Khokababur Pratyabartan in 1960. The first film directed by him is Surya Sikha (1963) starred Uttam Kumar and Supriya Choudhury. He also acted in a number of films like Atithi (1965 film), Khelaghar, Dhanyee Meye etc. Dutta directed 22 Bengali films in his career. He died on 20 September 2004 in Kolkata due to lung cancer.

== Filmography ==
- Surya Sikha (1963)
- Momer Alo (1964)
- Prastar Swakkhor (1967)
- Aparichita (1969)
- Kalankita Nayak (1970)
- Khunje Berai (1971)
- Stree (1972)
- Shesh Pristhay Dekhun (1973)
- Asati (1974)
- Sei Chokh (1976)
- Babu Moshai (1977)
- Heerey Manik (1979)
- Ghorer Baire Ghor (1980)
- Ogo Bodhu Sundori (1981)
- Rajeshwari (1984)
- Shyam Saheb (1986)
- Urvashi (1986)
- Jar Je Priyo (1987)
- Abishkar (1990)
- Amar Sathi (1991)
- Etai Swargo (2001)
