= Tulsi Chakraborty =

Indian actor and comedian (1899–1961)

- Chakraborty in Parash Pathar (1958)
- Born: 3 March 1899; Howrah, Bengal Presidency, British India
- Died: 11 December 1961 (aged 62); Howrah, West Bengal, India
- Occupation: Actor
- Years active: 1932–1961

Tulsi Chakraborty (also Tulsi Chakrabarti; 3 March 1899 – 11 December 1961) was an Indian actor and comedian who worked in Bengali cinema in the 1940s and 50s. His lead role in Parash Pathar, directed by Satyajit Ray, is among his most notable performances.

== Childhood ==
Tulsi Chakraborty was born on 3 March 1899 in the small village called Goari. His father, Ashutosh Chakraborty, was an employee of the Indian Railways and the family had to move around various places in undivided Bengal. So, young Tulsi had to spend a lot of time in Calcutta staying with his paternal uncle Prasad Chakraborty, the elder brother of Asutosh Chakraborty. Prasadbabu was a talented tabla and harmonium player who was an employee of the renowned Star Theatre, the legendary Bengali commercial theatre stage and production company. He had a small group of musicians who used to play live background music during theatrical performances. It was through his uncle's contacts that Tulsi was able to watch the finest actors of the generation at work and this fostered his own ambitions to become a singer-actor. Before launching in theatre, Tulsi Chakraborty engaged himself in a number of odd-jobs, starting from dish-washer in a small North Calcutta eatery to working as a clown in a circus in Burma (now Myanmar). In films, he started with character roles before performing as a comedian. He was known for his realistic acting. He never used any make-up or extra arrangements. Usually, he was clad in a white dhoti accompanied by a sacred thread on his shoulder.

== Career ==
One of Chakraborty's notable performances was in Sharey Chuattor, which was the debut film of the popular pair of Bengali cinema: Suchitra Sen and Uttam Kumar. In Parash Pathar directed by Satyajit Ray, he acted in the lead role as Paresh Chandra Dutta. He unleashed memorable roles in Uttam Kumar-Suchitra Sen starrers Ekti Raat and Chaowa Pawa. In both these films, Chakraborty played a sceptical inn owner; in the latter, he teamed up with Rajlakshmi Devi. He also had a small role that of a village pandit cum grocer in Pather Panchali. Ray once remarked that if Chakraborty has been born in the United States, he would have been awarded an Oscar for his acting.

He died on 11 December 1961.

== Life ==
Chakraborti spent the latter part of his life in utmost poverty. His widow was also known to have lived in abject poverty as was revealed by a television programme. Due to his poverty, he had to take a walk from Tollygunge studio to his home in Shibpur, Howrah.

Tulsi Chakraborty in a white dhoti accompanied by a sacred thread on his shoulder

== Selected filmography ==
- Punarjanma (1932)
- Sree Gouranga (1933)
- Rajnati Basantsena (1934) - Amatya
- Dhruba (1934)
- Dakshayajna (1934) - Brahma
- Kanthahaar (1935)
- Manmoyee Girls' School (1935) - Damodar Chakraborty
- Prabas Milan (1937) - Nanda
- Bekar Nashan (1938) - Pitambar
- Bamanabatar (1939) - Kashyap
- Nara Narayana (1939) - Jambaban Nara Narayan
- Janak Nandini (1939) - Janak
- Nimai Sanyasi (1940) - Adwaita
- Kamale Kamini (1940) - Bachal
- Uttarayan (1941) - Ramrup
- Pratisruti (1941)
- Shesh Utter (1942)
- Saugandh (1942) - Jogeshwar
- Pashan Devata (1942)
- Garmil (1942) - Jamidar's uncle
- Dikshul (1943)
- Devar (1943)
- Dampati (1943)
- Udayer Pathey (1944)
- Subah Shyam (1944)
- Meri Bahen (1944) - Chaudhary
- Hamrahi (1944)
- Dui Purush (1945) - Mahabharat
- Mane Na Mane (1945) - Nayeb
- Kalankini (1945)
- Bhabikaal (1945)
- Path Bendhe Dilo (1945)
- Pratima (1946)
- Suleh (1946)
- Mandir (1946)
- Biraj Bou (1946)
- Alakananda (1947)
- Pather Dabi (1947)
- Anirban (1948)
- Sir Sankarnath (1948)
- Samapika (1948)
- Purabi (1948)
- Banchita (1948)
- Sakahigopal (1949)
- Manzoor (1949)
- Kavi (1949)
- Bishnupriya (1949)
- Ashabari (1949)
- Mandanda (1949)
- Bamuner Meye (1949)
- Kamona (1949)
- Mandanda (1950)
- Baikunther Will (1950) - Bannerjee (Barujye)- Teacher
- Rupkatha (1950)
- Sheshbesh (1950)
- Mej Didi (1950) - Nabin
- Pandit Mashai (1951)
- Ananda Math (1951)
- Swapno O Samadhi (1952)
- Darpachurna (1952)
- Yatrik (1952) - Gopal Modi
- Meghmukti (1952)
- Sharey Chuattor (1953) - Rajanibabu
- Nabin Jatra (1953)
- Bana Hansi (1953)
- Atom Bomb (1954)
- Naramedh Yagna (1954)
- Sadanander Mela (1954)
- Ora Thake Odhare (1954)
- Moner Mayur (1954)
- Chheley Kaar (1954)
- Jaydev (1954) - Digambar
- Jadubhatta (1954)
- Grihapravesh (1954)
- Chheley Kaar (1954)
- Champadangar Bou (1954) as Ghoton
- Moyla Kagaj (1954)
- Sajher Pradip (1955)
- Joymakali Boarding (1955)
- Pather Panchali (1955) - Prasanna, school teacher
- Sabar Uparey (1955) - Editor of Court Newspaper (Rita's relative)
- Kalindi (1955)
- Upahar (1955) - Ghatak
- Shribatsa Chinda (1955)
- Shap Mochan (1955)
- Nishiddha Phal (1955)
- Godhuli (1955)
- Dujane (1955)
- Devimalini (1955)
- Bhalobasa (1955)
- Aparadhi (1955)
- Ekti Raat (1956) - Gossainji
- Asamapta (1956)
- Shyamali (1956)
- Amar Bou (1956)
- Surjamukhi (1956)
- Sadhak Ramprasad (1956)
- Chore (1956)
- Harjit (1957)
- Pyaasa (1957)
- Prithibi Amare Chaay (1957)
- Adarsha Hindu Hotel (1957)
- Khela Bhangar Khela (1957)
- Harishchandra (1957)
- Kancha-Mithey (1957)
- Ogo Shunchho (1957)
- Chandranath (1957)
- Abhoyer Biye (1957)
- Bardidi (1957)
- Kangsa (1958)
- Rajlakshmi O Srikanta (1958) - Ratan
- Parash Pathar (1958) - Paresh Chandra Dutta
- Ajantrik (1958)
- Surya Toran (1958)
- Sonar Kathi (1958)
- Joutuk (1958)
- Rajdhani Theke (1958)
- Swarga Martya (1958)
- Sonar Kathi (1958)
- Jamalaye Jibanta Manush (1958)
- Indrani (1958)
- Derso Khokhar Kando (1959)
- Gali Thekey Rajpath (1959)
- Personal Assistant (1959) - Publisher
- Mriter Martye Agaman (1959)
- Deep Jwele Jaai (1959)
- Chaowa Pawa (1959)
- Abak Prithibi (1959)
- Dui Bechara (1960)
- Shesh Paryanta (1960)
- Suno Baranari (1960)
- Ratan Lal Bangali (1960)
- Nader Nimai (1960)
- Maya Mriga (1960)
- Kuhak (1960) - Adhikary
- Khokababur Pratyabartan (1960)
- Mr. & Mrs Choudhury (1961)
- Bishkanya (1961)
- Kanchanmulya (1961)
- Aaj Kal Parshu (1961)
- Saptapadi (1961) - Hospital Employee
- Kanamachi (1961)
- Manick (1961)
- Dui Bhai (1961) - Banamali (Factory Worker)
- Carey Saheber Munshi (1961)
- Bipasha (1962; released after his death) - Shopkeeper At Red Light Area
- Banarasi (1962)
- Agun (1962)
- Dui Bari (1963)
- Hasi Shudhu Hasi Noy (1963)
- Khudha (1975) - (final film role)

== See also ==
- Satyajit Ray
- Uttam Kumar
- Suchitra Sen
- Bhanu Bandyopadhyay
