= Kamona =

- Directed by: Nabendu Sundar
- Starring: Uttam Kumar; Chhabi Roy; Tulsi Chakraborty; Jahar Ganguly; Jamuna Sinha; Amar Choudhury
- Production company: Kirti Pictures
- Release date: 4 March 1949
- Language: Bengali

Kamona (transl. Desire) is a Bengali drama film directed by Nabendu Sundar. This movie was released on 4 March 1949 under the banner of Kirti Pictures. This is the second film of iconic legendary Bengali actor Uttam Kumar after Drishtidan and debut as the leading person crediting him as Uttam Chatterjee instead of Arun Kumar Chatterjee. The film was a huge flop at the box office

== Cast ==
- Uttam Kumar
- Chhabi Roy
- Tulsi Chakraborty
- Jahar Ganguly
- Jamuna Sinha
- Amar Choudhury
- Rajlakshmi Debi
- Ashu Bose
- Priti Majumdar
- Phani Ray

== Soundtrack ==
Kamona

Soundtrack album by Suchitra Mitra
- Released: 1948
- Recorded: 1949
- Studio: Kirti Pictures
- Genre: Feature Film Soundtrack
- Length: 0:05:44
- Label: Jio Savan

All lyrics are written by Rabindranath Tagore; all music is composed by Rabindranath Tagore.

Songs
No.	Title	Playback	Length
1.	"Dekona Amare Dekona"	Suchitra Mitra	2:59
2.	"Ei Karachho Bhalo Nithur"	Suchitra Mitra	2:45
Total length:			05:44
