= Nishi Padma =

1970 Bengali drama film directed by Arabinda Mukhopadhyay

- Theatrical poster
- Directed by: Arabinda Mukhopadhyay
- Based on: Hinger Kochuri by Bibhutibhushan Bandyopadhyay
- Screenplay by: Arabinda Mukhopadhyay
- Dialogues by: Arabinda Mukhopadhyay
- Story by: Bibhutibhushan Bandopadhyay
- Produced by: Shantimoy Banerjee
- Starring: Uttam Kumar; Sabitri Chatterjee; Anup Kumar
- Cinematography: Sailaja Chatterjee
- Edited by: Amiyo Mukherjee
- Music by: Nachiketa Ghosh
- Production company: Chirantan Chitra
- Release date: 23 October 1970
- Country: India
- Language: Bengali

Nishi Padma (Bengali pronunciation: [ˈniʃi ˈpəd̪ma] transl. The Night-Lotus) is a 1970 Indian Bengali-language drama film co-written and directed by Arabinda Mukhopadhyay. Produced by Shantimoy Banerjee under the banner of Chirantan Chitra, the film is based on Bibhutibhushan Bandopadhyay's short story Hinger Kochuri. The film portrays the decline of human values and relationships and contrasts it by presenting an illustrious example of a boy's innocent love for a neighbourhood tawaif (courtesan).

The film stars Sabitri Chatterjee playing a hooker with a heart of gold, with Uttam Kumar in the role of a lonely businessman and Anup Kumar as adult Nanda, the young child, who they both come to care for. It also stars Jahar Roy, Gangapada Basu, Gita Dey and Nripati Chatterjee in other supporting roles. Music of the film is composed by Nachiketa Ghosh, with lyrics penned by Gauriprasanna Mazumder and Mukhopadhyay himself. The cinematography of the film is handled by Sailaja Chatterjee, while Amiyo Mukherjee edited the film. The film marks the first collaboration between Mukhopadhyay and Kumar and the 30th film of the lead pair.

Nishi Padma theatrically released on 23 October 1970, opening to a critical and commercial success, running for over 250 days in theatres. It emerged as the highest-grossing Bengali film of the year and gained a cult status among the audiences. At the 18th National Film Awards, the film won two awards – Best Male Playback Singer (Manna Dey) for "Ja Khushi Ora Bole Boluk" and Best Female Playback Singer (Sandhya Mukherjee) for "Ore Sakol Sona Molin Holo".

Nishi Padma was remade into Hindi in 1972 as Amar Prem by Shakti Samanta, starring Rajesh Khanna, Sharmila Tagore and Vinod Mehra, where Mukhopadhyay served as its screenwriter, in his debut in Hindi cinema. It is included in India Today's "100 greatest Indian films of all time".

== Plot ==
Pushpo ends up committing suicide after both her husband and her mother turn against her. She is sold off to a brothel in Calcutta. by her uncle Nepal Babu. In the brothel, she encounters Ananga Dutta, a rich businessman who is not satisfied with his wife. He frequently visits her, and they get involved in a romantic relationship.

Later, a widowed man with his family, from the same village as her, moves in close to Pushpo's place. The new neighbour's son, Nanda, does not get any love at home, as his father works all the time and his stepmother does not care about him. Nanda's father learns about Pushpo's new life and forbids her from interacting with him and his family as he fears what people would say. However, Pushpo starts treating Nanda as her own son when she realises that he is mistreated at home, and often goes hungry. Nanda also comes to love Pushpo and starts to regard her as his mother. He visits her every day and comes upon Ananga, who also becomes fond of him becoming a father figure, calling him Pushpo's son, seeing the way Pushpo loves the child.

One day, Ananga's brother-in-law comes to see Pushpo and demands that she tell Ananga to stop visiting her. With great reluctance, Pushpo agrees and she turns Ananga away when he comes to see her. It is then that the businessman realises that he is in love with Pushpo. When Nanda suffers from fever and his treatment is too expensive, Pushpo asks Ananga for help and he secretly finances the treatment and does not let anybody know. When the doctor asks him why is he so keen on helping Nanda, he replies some relationships have no names. However, when Nanda's father asks the doctor who paid for the treatment, the doctor says that his mother did. Then Nanda's father discovers that it was Pushpo who saved her son's life and he thanks her and gives her the sari that he had bought for his wife, telling her that it was a gift from a brother to a sister. A touched Pushpo accepts.

Nanda's family has to move to the village and Nanda plants a sapling of night-flowering jasmine (Jnuyee or Parijat) at Pushpo's home, making her promise to always take care of it. Pushpo cries and agrees.

Several years later, Nanda grows up to become a government engineer posted in the same town. Ananga meets Pushpo, now working as a maidservant who is ill-treated and they both reconcile. Nanda unsuccessfully searches for her and gives up after inquiring in the neighbourhood. Nanda's son gets sick and they go to the same doctor. Meanwhile, having met Pushpo, Ananga decides to catch up with all his old friends and meets the doctor. During the conversation, he reveals that he has stopped drinking and visiting brothels once he left Pushpo. He also tells him that he is now divorced/separated due to his wife's partying ways, but is finally at peace and is happy with Pushpo's love and affection in his heart. They talk about Nanda and the Doctor informs him that Nanda is in town. Nanda meets Ananga when he comes to meet the doctor to ask regarding the medicine, who takes him to meet Pushpo. Both of them, unable to see Pushpo ill-treated, stand up for her and in the end Nanda takes Pushpo home with him, like a son who is reunited with his long lost mother with Ananga looking on, crying happily.

== Cast ==
- Uttam Kumar as Ananga Dutta
- Sabitri Chatterjee as Pushpo
- Anup Kumar as Nanda
  - Master Malay as child Nanda
- Nripati Chattopadhyay
- Jahor Roy as Natabar
- Gita Dey
- Gangapada Basu
- Asha Devi
- Rajlakshmi Devi
- Premangshu Bose

== Soundtrack ==
Nishi Padma

Soundtrack album by Nachiketa Ghosh
- Released: 1970
- Genre: Feature film soundtrack
- Length: 13:00
- Label: Saregama
- Producer: Nachiketa Ghosh

Nachiketa Ghosh chronology
Chirodiner (1969)	Nishi Padma (1970)	Bilambita Loy (1970)

The songs and score of the film is composed by Nachiketa Ghosh; it marks his second collaboration with Mukhopadhyay after Kichhukkhon (1959), and ninth collaboration with Kumar after Trijama (1956), Nabajanma (1956), Prithibi Amare Chay (1957), Indrani (1958), Bondhu (1958), Haat Baralei Bondhu (1960) and Chirodiner (1969). The lyrics are provided by Gauriprasanna Mazumder, Chandidas Basu and Mukhopadhyay himself.

Track listing
No.	Title	Lyrics	Singer(s)	Length
1.	"Rajar Pankhi Uyira Gele"	Arabinda Mukhopadhyay	Shyamal Mitra	3:15
2.	"Ja Khushi Ora Bole Boluk"	Gauriprasanna Mazumder	Manna Dey	3:10
3.	"Naa Naa Naa Aaj Rate Aar"	Gauriprasanna Mazumder	Manna Dey	3:29
4.	"Ore Sokol Sona Molin Holo"	Chandidas Basu	Sandhya Mukherjee	3:06
Total length:				13:00

== Awards ==
- 1970 National Film Awards
  - Best Male Playback Singer: Manna Dey - "Ja Khushi Ora Bole"
  - Best Female Playback Singer: Sandhya Mukherjee - "Ore Sakol Sona Molin Holo".

== Reception ==
The film became a major box-office success and ran for 250 days in theaters. The performances of Kumar and Chatterjee were widely acclaimed by critics. This was the highest grossing Bengali film in 1970.

== Remake ==
Nishi Padma drew the attention of Shakti Samanta saw the film, who decided to remake it in Hindi, being impressed by Kumar's performance in the film. On his request, Mukhopadhyay wrote the screenplay of the remake and did some changes to the script. It was titled as Amar Prem (1972), and starred Sharmila Tagore and Rajesh Khanna in lead roles. To prepare his role, Khanna was advised by Samanta to internalize Kumar's performance from the original. After the release of the film in 1972, during a premiere of the film in Kolkata, Khanna confessed that he watched the film 24 times to copy him and cited "I consider myself lucky if I can do at least 50% of what Uttam Da (Kumar) had done in Nishi Padma." The climax of the film was filmed in Kolkata under the supervision of Mukhopadhyay due to Samanta's absence, who later wrote that Khanna had added a unique touch to the character in spite of copying Kumar.
