= Aparichita (1969 film) =

1969 Indian Bengali film by Salil Dutta

- Directed by: Salil Dutta
- Based on: Aparichita by Samaresh Basu
- Screenplay by: Salil Dutta
- Story by: Samaresh Basu
- Produced by: Debnath Roy; Geetali Dutta
- Starring: Uttam Kumar; Soumitra Chatterjee; Sandhya Roy; Aparna Sen; Utpal Dutt; Bikash Roy; Tarun Kumar; Dilip Roy; Haradhan Banerjee
- Cinematography: Pankaj Das
- Edited by: Baidyanath Chatterjee
- Music by: Robin Chatterjee
- Production company: R. D. Productions
- Distributed by: Chandimata Films Pvt Ltd.
- Release date: 5 December 1969
- Country: India
- Language: Bengali

Aparichita is a 1969 Indian Bengali-language thriller film co-written and directed by Salil Dutta. Produced by Debnath Roy and Geetali Dutta under the banner of R. D. Productions, the film is based on the novel of the same name by Samaresh Basu, which itself was actually inspired by The Idiot written by Fyodor Dostoyevsky. It stars Uttam Kumar, Soumitra Chatterjee, Sandhya Roy, and Aparna Sen in the lead, while Utpal Dutt, Bikash Roy, Tarun Kumar, Dilip Roy and Haradhan Bandyopadhyay in another pivotal roles.

== Plot ==
Politician Priyanath forces Sunita for prostitution. She is abducted by the gangster Ranjan but latter involves and falls in love with Sujit. Sujit, just recovered from mental breakdown also involves with Sunita. While Sunita is going to marry Sujit, Ranjan kills Sunita.

== Cast ==
- Uttam Kumar as Ranjan
- Soumitra Chatterjee as Sujitnath Dutta
- Aparna Sen as Sunita
- Sandhya Roy as Dola
- Utpal Dutta
- Tarun Kumar
- Bikash Roy
- Dilip Roy
- Haradhan Banerjee
