= Dhruba =

1934 Bengali film

Dhrubo
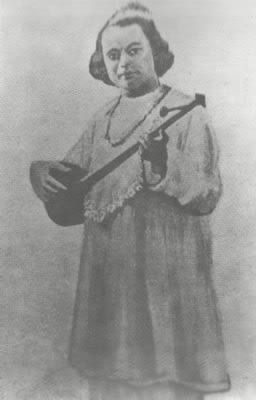
- Kazi Nazrul Islam as Narada
- Directed by: Kazi Nazrul Islam; Satyendranath Dey
- Based on: Dhruba Charit by Girish Chandra Ghosh
- Produced by: Pioneer Films Company
- Starring: Joynarayan Mukhopaddhay; Kazi Nazrul Islam
- Cinematography: T. Marconi
- Music by: Kazi Nazrul Islam
- Release date: January 1, 1934
- Country: British India
- Language: Bangla

Dhrubo is a 1934 Indian Bengali mythological drama film based on Girish Chandra Ghosh's story Dhruba Charit, jointly directed by poet Kazi Nazrul Islam and Satyendranath Dey.

Child actor Probodh played the role of Dhruva, while Nityananda Ghatak portrayed the deity Vishnu (Shri Hari). The cast also included Miss Violet, Parul Bala, Angurbala, and others. Nazrul appeared as Narada, the celestial sage in Hindu mythology known as a divine musician and messenger. In the narrative, Narada meets the meditative child Dhruva in the forest and instructs him on how to attain the grace of Vishnu.

This film was released on 1 January 1934 under the banner of Madan Theatres and Pioneer Films.

== Plot ==
There was a king named Uttampad in the purakal (ancient times). His wife Suniti used to worship lord Vishnu every day. They had no shortage of anything, the only thing that they did not have was a son. So Suniti arranged a marriage of his husband again with a beautiful princess Sundari. Even Sundari could not produce a child, but Sundari was able to do one thing. She forced the king to send Suniti into exile in a forest and losing his way in the jungle took shelter in Suniti's hut. After 5 years Suniti got back her husband. She gave birth to a son, named Dhruba. Dhruba learnt worshipping Lord Hari from his mother. One day Dhruba came to know that he was actually the son of king Uttampad. Without informing her mother five year old Dhruba went to king's palace and begged for food and cloth from the king. As the king came to know who was Dhruba he was about to place Dhruba on the throne, Suniti came and rebuked Dhruba. Dhruba came to Suniti in her jungle hut. He came to know if he could get the blessing of Lord Hari he would get every thing including his father. Dhruba went to deep jungle and started meditation. At last getting impressed by Dhruba Lord Narayan blessed Dhruba. King Uttampad took back Dhruba and queen Suniti to his kingdom.

== Cast ==
- Joynarayan Mukhopadhyay as King Uttampad
- Kazi Nazrul Islam as Narada
- Tulsi Chakraborty
- Angurbala
- Master Probodh
- Nityananda Ghatak
- Kunjalal Chakraborty
- Kartik Chandra De
- Miss Violet
- Parulbala

== Production ==
In the 1930s, Kazi Nazrul Islam was appointed as a music director at Madan Theatres, a film production company owned by the Parsi couple Piroj Madan and his wife. In 1933, Mrs. Piroj Madan founded the Pioneer Films Company. Dhruba was produced under this banner and was co-directed by Kazi Nazrul Islam and Satyendranath Dey.

== Music ==
Of the 18 songs featured in the film, 17 were written and composed by Kazi Nazrul Islam. He performed one solo and one duet with child actor Probodh, as playback singing had not yet been introduced at the time. The songs written and composed by Nazrul for the film include: "Jago Byathar Thakur", "Abirata Badal Barshichhe", "Chomke Chopola Meghe Mogon Gogon", "Dhular Thakur", "Harinamer Sudha", "Ami Rajar Kumar", "He Dukkhohoron Bhakter Shoron", "Shishu Natobor Neche Jay", "Madhur Chhonde Nache Anonde", "Gohon Bone Shri Hari Namer", "Dao Dekha Dao Dekha", "Phutilo Manas Madhabi Kunje" (performed by Nazrul himself), "Hridipadme Choron Rakho", "Phire Ay Ore Phire Ay", "Nacho Bonamali", "Joi Pitambar Shyam Sundar", and "Kadis Na Ar Kadis Na".

== Cultural significance ==
Dhruba holds exceptional cultural significance in South Asian film history as it was directed by Kazi Nazrul Islam, arguably the first Muslim filmmaker in the Indian subcontinent. The film is particularly notable for featuring Nazrul—a Muslim artist—both directing and acting in a Hindu mythological narrative, exemplifying the cultural syncretism of the period. He composed 17 of the film's 18 songs and provided playback for four, demonstrating his multifaceted artistic contribution.

== Preservation ==
Regrettably, the film's original nitrate negatives deteriorated during the COVID-19 Lockdown due to inadequate preservation, leading to the loss of this cinematic piece. Only a few clips survive, some of which are accessible online.
