= Ramuni Minchina Ramudu =

- Theatrical release poster
- Directed by: M. S. Gopinath
- Written by: D. V. Narasa Raju (dialogues)
- Screenplay by: M. S. Gopinath
- Story by: M. S. Gopinath
- Produced by: M. S. Gopinath; N. Bhatkavatsalam
- Starring: N. T. Rama Rao; Vanisri
- Cinematography: G. K. Ramu
- Edited by: I. V. Shanmugam
- Music by: T. Chalapathi Rao
- Production company: Rajeswari Fine Arts
- Release date: 12 June 1975
- Running time: 135 mins
- Country: India
- Language: Telugu

Ramuni Minchina Ramudu is a 1975 Indian Telugu-language war drama film produced by M. S. Gopinath and N. Bhatkavatsalam under the Rajeswari Fine Arts banner and directed by M. S. Gopinath. A remake of Uttam Kumar starrer Bengali film Uttarayan (1963), the film stars N. T. Rama Rao in dual roles, alongside Vanisri, with music composed by T. Chalapathi Rao.

== Cast ==
- N. T. Rama Rao as Ramu & Raghu (Dual role)
- Vanisri as Lakshmi
- Jaggayya as Brigadier
- Prabhakar Reddy as Rayudu
- Allu Ramalingaiah as Raghu's maternal uncle
- Dhulipala
- Nagesh as Chiranjeevi
- Tyagaraju
- Pandari Bai as Ramu's sister
- S. Varalakshmi as Raghu's mother
- Srividya as Latha
- Nirmalamma as Latha's mother

== Soundtrack ==
Ramuni Minchina Ramudu

Film score by T. Chalapathi Rao
- Released: 1975
- Genre: Soundtrack
- Length: 27:44
- Producer: T. Chalapathi Rao

Music composed by T. Chalapathi Rao.

S. No	Song title	Lyrics	Singers	length
1	"Idhi Naa Puttina Roju"	C. Narayana Reddy	Madhavpeddi Ramesh	4:17
2	"Premaku Neeve Devudavu"	Dasaradhi	S. P. Balasubrahmanyam, P. Susheela	4:50
3	"Andharidhi Ee Vijayam"	C. Narayana Reddy	S. P. Balasubrahmanyam, Ramakrishna Das	5:18
4	"Idhenaa Mana Neethi"	Dasaradhi	S. P. Balasubrahmanyam	4:41
5	"Evo Chukkallo"	C. Narayana Reddy	P. Susheela	4:24
6	"Chinnaari Naa Raani"	Dasaradhi	S. P. Balasubrahmanyam, P. Susheela	4:14
