= Bidhayak Bhattacharya =

- বিধায়ক ভট্টাচার্য্য
- Born: Baglaranjan Bhattacharya; 7 February 1907; Jiaganj, Bengal Presidency, British India (now Jiaganj, West Bengal, India)
- Died: 15 November 1986 (aged 79); Kolkata, India
- Occupations: Writer, Novelist, Dramatist, Journalist

Bidhayak Bhattacharya (7 February 1907 – 15 November 1986) was a Bengali novelist, play writer and actor. His birth name was Bagalaranjan.

== Early life ==
Bhattacharya was born at Jiaganj in Murshidabad district in 1907 in British India. His father's name is Haricharan Bhattacharya. In 1937, Rabindranath Tagore called him in a new name as Bidhayak. He passed entrance from Raja Bijoy Singh Vidyamandir of Jiaganj. Thereafter he came Kolkata in 1929 and joined in Amrita Bazar Patrika as journalist. He became popular as theater personality after the release of Meghmukti in 1938. Bhattacharya started his career in All India Radio, Kolkata under the guidance of Kazi Nazrul Islam.

== Literary career ==
He was the writer of the story of several Bengali films namely Krishna Kaveri, Akash Ar Mati, Dhuli, Matir Ghar and Prithibi Amare Chay. He also directed the film Krishna Kaveri in 1949. Bhattacharya wrote number of Bengali novel and short stories in various magazine. He published more than thirty successful plays. Bhattacharya created a famous Bengali character Amaresh. He received Sudhangshubala award in 1967 conferred by the Calcutta University for his literary works.

== Filmography ==
- Bhranti Bilas
- Deya Neya
- Tridhara
- Abak Prithibi
- Uttar Megh
- Abasheshe
- Gayer Meye
- Sudha
