= Sei Chokh =

- Directed by: Salil Dutta
- Written by: Bimal Mitra
- Produced by: Gitali Dutta
- Starring: Uttam Kumar; Sabitri Chatterjee; Utpal Dutt; Mahua Roychoudhury
- Cinematography: Bijoy Ghosh
- Edited by: Amiya Mukherjee
- Music by: Nachiketa Ghosh
- Production company: Gitali Pictures
- Release date: 30 July 1976
- Country: India
- Language: Bengali

Sei Chokh is a 1976 Bengali-language masala film directed by Salil Dutta based on a story by Bengali novelist Bimal Mitra. Nachiketa Ghosh was the music director of the film, which was released under the banner of Gitali Pictures.

== Plot ==
Nabakrishna's uncle Prankrishna brings him back to their home from a mental facility. Nabakrishna had previously lived like a free bird, always had his way with women and being kind hearted, he always gifted them. He cannot bear the restrictions imposed by his uncle and aunts, and soon escapes with his servant Bipul. They don't have any place to stay hence Nabakrishna goes to Mrs. Nandi's home. Nita, Mrs. Nandi's niece is a simple girl who loved Amal against her aunt's will, but Mrs. Nandi plans to separate them and fixes Nita's marriage with Nabakrishna. Hearing the news of the marriage another lady, Malati, rushes to cancel it because she was Nabakrishna's ex lover. By this time Nita's lover Amal also returns.

== Cast ==
- Uttam Kumar as Nabakrishna
- Utpal Dutt
- Sabitri Chatterjee
- Mahua Roychoudhury as Nita
- Sulata Chowdhury
- Chhaya Devi
- Jahor Roy
- Anup Kumar
- Dilip Roy
- Basabi Nandi
- Tarun Kumar
- Partha Mukhopadhya as Amal
- Kalyani Adhikari
- Haradhan Bannerjee
- Moni Srimani
- Sailen Mukhopadhyay
- Amarnath Mukhopadhyay

== Soundtrack ==
Soundtrack was composed by Nachiketa Ghosh.

Song	Artist(s)
"Phal Pakle Mithe"	Manna Dey
"Heerer Angti Abar Bynka"	Manna Dey
"Chhi Chhi Chhi Chhi"	Shyamal Mitra
"Ke Janto"	Shyamal Mitra
