= Gananatya =

Indian theatre group

Gananatya Sangha
- Type: Theatre group
- Location: Kolkata, India

Gananatya, or Gananatya Sangha, which started the Gananatya Andolan (People's Theatre Movement), were a radical theatre group which attempted to bring social and political theater to rural villages in Bengal during the colonial rule in India in the 1930s and 1940s.
