= Asit Baran =

Indian actor

- Born: 19 November 1913; Kolkata, Bengal Presidency, British India
- Died: 27 November 1984 (aged 71); Kolkata, West Bengal, India
- Occupation: Actor

Asit Baran (19 November 1913 – 27 November 1984) was an Indian actor, singer and theater personality.

== Early life ==
Asit Baran was born as Asit Baran Mukherjee in 1913 in Kolkata, British India. His nickname was Kalo. He took up a job in the telegraph workshop at Alipore. He learnt the tabla from Jnan Prakash Ghosh and joined Akashbani Kolkata as a tabla player. While performing the tabla in All India Radio Music Conference, actor Pahari Sanyal impressed on him. Asit Baran was often called upon to sing at various music functions in Kolkata.

== Career ==
He first acted in the film Pratishruti in 1941. Within the next few years he performed as actor-cum-singer in several films in Bengali and Hindi. After that, Asit Baran worked continuously for more than four decades on the silver screen, starred in number of Bengali as well as Hindi films. He also started the theatre group Rangarash. Asit Baran died on 27 November 1984.

== Selected filmography ==
- Pratishruti
- Kashinath (1943)
- Nurse
- Surya Sakhi
- Kar Pape (1952)
- Parineeta (1953)
- Pratyabartan
- Hrad (1955)
- Parchhain
- Badsha (1963 film) (1963)
- Bhagini Nivedita
- Drishtidan
- Nishachar (1971)
- Bondhu
- Mantra Shakti
- Khokababur Pratyabartan
- Sudhar Prem
- Smriti Tuku Thak
- Alor Pipasa
- Ashite Ashiona
- Antony Firingee
- Teen Batti Char Raasta
- Rajkumari
- Sri Sri Ramkrishna Kothamrita
- Jadi Jantem
- Bagh Bondi Khela
- Khana Baraha
- Kalankini Kankabati
- Ma Bhabani Ma Amar
- Joradighir Chowdhury Paribar (1966)
- Prithivi Amarey Chai
