= Uttar Megh =

1960 film

- উত্তর মেঘ
- Directed by: Jiban Ganguly
- Starring: Supriya Choudhury; Utpal Dutt; Kamal Mitra; Uttam Kumar
- Production company: J.M.Pictures
- Distributed by: National Movies
- Release date: 12 January 1960 (India)
- Country: India
- Language: Bengali

Uttar Megh is a 1960 Bengali film directed by Jiban Ganguly. This is a drama film. This film was released on 12 January 1960. The film stars Supriya Choudhury, Utpal Dutt, Kamal Mitra and Uttam Kumar in the lead roles. This film's production company was J.M.Pictures and it was distributed under the banner of National Movies.

== Cast ==
- Supriya Choudhury
- Utpal Dutt
- Kamal Mitra
- Uttam Kumar
- Bidhayak Bhattacharya
