= Baksa Badal =

1970 Indian Bengali-language film

- Directed by: Nityananda Datta
- Screenplay by: Satyajit Ray
- Story by: Bibhutibhushan Bandyopadhyay
- Starring: Soumitra Chatterjee; Aparna Sen; Prasad Mukhopadhyay; Satindra Bhattacharya; Subrato Sen; Jamuna Singha; Aparna Debi; Charuprakash Ghosh; Sabitri Chatterjee; Gitali Ray; Ila Chattopadhyay; Mamtaz Ahmed; Supratim Ghosh
- Cinematography: Soumendu Roy
- Edited by: Ramesh Joshi
- Music by: Satyajit Ray
- Production company: D. M. Productions
- Release date: 1970
- Country: India
- Language: Bengali

Baksa Badal is a 1970 Bengali film directed by Nityananda Datta. The film was released by D. M. Productions, with music composed by Satyajit Ray. The film starred Soumitra Chatterjee, Aparna Sen, Prasad Mukhopadhyay, Satindra Bhattacharya, Subrato Sen, and Sabitri Chatterjee in lead roles.

== Cast ==
- Soumitra Chatterjee
- Aparna Sen
- Prasad Mukhopadhyay
- Satindra Bhattacharya
- Subrato Sen
- Sabitri Chatterjee
