= Nityananda Datta =

Indian filmmaker (born 1933)

Nityananda Datta (born 13 August 1933) was an Indian filmmaker who was originally from Chittagong, then in Bengal Presidency.

Datta is best known for his work with Satyajit Ray as his assistant director. His body of work includes some of Ray's most renowned works depicting life and struggles of people in Calcutta and West Bengal, such as Charulata, Aparajito, Kanchenjungha, Devi, The World of Apu, and Jalsaghar.

Later in his career, Dutta also directed his own features, including Baksa Badal (1970) (written by Ray, who also composed the music) and Hathat Dekha (1967).

After relocating to Bombay, Datta supported filmmaker Hrishikesh Mukherjee as associate director in several more films. He also worked on several documentary films sponsored by Doordarshan between 1977 and 1983.
