= Hathat Dekha =

1967 Indian Bengali film

- Directed by: Nityananda Datta
- Starring: Soumitra Chatterjee; Sandhya Roy; Jahor Roy
- Release date: 27 January 1967
- Country: India
- Language: Bengali

Hathat Dekha is a 1967 Bengali drama film directed by Nityananda Datta. The film featured Soumitra Chatterjee, Sandhya Roy, and Jahor Roy in lead roles.

== Cast ==
- Soumitra Chatterjee
- Sandhya Roy
- Jahor Roy
- Bhanu Bannerjee
- Anup Kumar
- Pahari Sanyal
- Geetali Roy
