= Momer Alo =

- Directed by: Salil Datta
- Screenplay by: Salil Datta
- Story by: Salil Datta
- Produced by: Madhabi Pictures
- Starring: Uttam Kumar; Sabitri Chatterjee; Utpal Dutta; Geeta Dey
- Music by: Robin Chatterjee
- Release date: 1964
- Country: India
- Language: Bengali

Momer Alo is a 1964 Bengali drama film directed by Salil Dutta. The film stars Uttam Kumar and Sabitri Chatterjee in lead roles. It has music composed by Robin Chatterjee.

== Synopsis ==
Deepa a schizophrenic patient loses her normalcy due to a mishap that occurred in her personal life. Dr. Surajit Sen takes this case as a challenge to prove that an injured mind needs more care and a better understanding than any medicine on therapy. The film portrays how the doctor gets intimate with his patient and slowly gets into the detail of her crisis and enables her to lead a normal life.

== Cast ==
- Uttam Kumar as Dr. Surajit Sen
- Sabitri Chatterjee as Deepa
- Lolita Chatterjee as Baruna
- Rabi Ghosh as Gobardhan
- Geeta Dey - Sukhiya
- Utpal Dutt - Dr. Shome
- Subir Sen as Shantanu
- Robin Majumdar as Pandit Shibshankar
- Haradhan Bandyopadhyay as Anant Chatterjee
- Ardhendu Bhattacharya
- Shailen Ganguly
- Gopal Ghosh
- Rishi Banerjee

== Soundtrack ==
All music is composed by Robin Chatterjee

song title
No.	Title	singer(s)	Length
1.	"Ogo Kajol Noyona"	Subir Sen	3:16
2.	"Phire Phire Daaki"	Sandhya Mukherjee	3:23
Total length:			6:39
