= Sonar Harin =

1959 film

- সোনার হরিণ
- Directed by: Mangal Chakravarty
- Written by: Rashbehari Lal
- Story by: Rashbehari Lal
- Produced by: Girija Shankar Dutta
- Starring: Uttam Kumar; Kali Bannerjee; Supriya Choudhury; Bhanu Banerjee; Chhabi Biswas; Tarun Kumar; Lakshmi Devi; Mihir Bhattacharya
- Cinematography: Ajoy Mitra
- Edited by: Bishwanath Nayak
- Music by: Hemanta Mukherjee; Gauriprasanna Majumdar (lyrics)
- Production company: National Picturers
- Distributed by: S.K. Films
- Release date: 8 October 1959 (India)
- Running time: 154 min.
- Country: India
- Language: Bengali

Sonar Harin (transl. The Golden Deer) is a 1959 Indian Bengali-language spy action-thriller film co-written and directed by Mangal Chakravarty. This film was written by Rashbehari Lal. The production company for this film is National Pictures. It was distributed by S.K. Films. The music for the film was composed by Hemanta Mukherjee. The film stars Uttam Kumar, Kali Bannerjee Supriya Choudhury in lead and this is the first film that Supriya Devi appears as a leading heroine. Others Bhanu Banerjee, Chhabi Biswas and Tarun Kumar played in supporting roles.

== Plot ==
Captain Jayanta Chowdhary comes back gravely injured and is taken care of by his fiancé Kuntala, who is an air hostess. It takes a long time for Jayanta to recover and come out of the trauma. He is visited by Sunanda, his colleague's widowed wife. He holds himself responsible for Sunanda's husband Partho's death and returns his ring to her. Jayanta leaves for Calcutta abruptly and starts following art ground. An engineer by profession, Sandeep Mukherjee is forced to work for a smuggling gang run by Krisan Chand and Abdullah. He does this because he needs money for the treatment of his handicapped brother Beenu in Vienna. He often visits a bar where Ruby, his beloved stays. Soon the Intelligence Department headed by Ranjit Mitra starts tracing Sandeep's source of money. Jayanta helps them in the whole. It is found that Ruby had borrowed the money from Krishan Chand and given it to Sandeep. The police can't do anything because the transaction is recorded on paper. Jayanta now takes up the name of Arun Ray, a ground engineer and friend of Beenu. Sandeep's brother comes back. After recovery Sandeep invites Jayanta to his house where he discovers that Kuntala, then also in Calcutta, is Sandeep's sister. When Kuntala goes to visit him in his hotel, Jayanta breaks off the engagement. Meanwhile, Krishan Chand tells Sandeep that Arun is a spy and orders him to find out how much he knows about the gang. Sandeep comes home to find a broken Kuntala who tells him about her engagement being cancelled. Learning the name of her fiancé makes everything clear to him. He can't bear the fact that his sister would pay for his crime. He goes to Jayanta and is about to confess everything when he is shot by Abdullah. Following a gun fight, Jayanta shoots Abdullah dead. Sandeep confesses everything to Ranjit Mitra who records it before his death . Jayanta begs forgiveness from Shakuntala. The couple is reconciled. Krishan Chand has paid him a lot of money and fooled him into planting a bomb in a foreign chartered plane in which Jayanta and others were flying. It was a plot hatched by the opposition party of foreign country. He did this to pay for Beenu's treatment.

== Cast ==
- Uttam Kumar
- Kali Bannerjee
- Supriya Choudhury
- Bhanu Banerjee
- Chhabi Biswas
- Tarun Kumar
- Lakshmi Devi
- Mihir Bhattacharya
- Kuntala Chatterjee
- Padmadevi
- Bipin Gupta
- Namita Sinha

== Music ==
Sonar Harin

Soundtrack album by Hemanta Mukherjee
- Released: 1959
- Recorded: 1958
- Studio: National Pictures
- Length: 0:09:20
- Label: Sa Re Ga Ma Pa
- Producer: Girija Shankar Dutta

Hemanta Mukherjee chronology
Marutirtha Hinglaj (1959)	Sonar Harin (1959)	Khaniker Atithi (1959)

All lyrics are written by Gauriprasanna Mazumder; all music is composed by Hemant Kumar.

Songs
No.	Title	Playback	Length
1.	"Ei Je Chander Alo"	Sandhya Mukherjee	3:41
2.	"Tomar Duti Chokh"	Geeta Dutt	3:02
3.	"Ei Mayabi Tithi"	Geeta Dutt	2:37
Total length:			9:20
