= Hawrah district =

Coordinates: 15°00′N 48°30′E

Hawrah District
- District
- Interactive map of Hawrah District
- Country: Yemen
- Governorate: Hadhramaut

Population (2003)
  - Total: 28,474
- Time zone: UTC+3 (Yemen Standard Time)

Hawrah District is a district of the Hadhramaut Governorate, Yemen. As of 2003, the district had a population of 28,474 inhabitants.
