= Manmoyee Girls' School =

1935 film by Jyotish Bannerjee

- Directed by: Jyotish Bannerjee
- Based on: Manmoyee Girls' School by Rabindranath Maitra
- Starring: Tulsi Chakraborty; Jahar Ganguly; Kanan Devi
- Cinematography: D. G. Gune
- Music by: Anath Basu; Mrinal Ghosh; Kumar Mitra
- Production company: Radha Films Company
- Release date: 1935
- Running time: 152 minutes
- Country: India
- Language: Bengali

Manmoyee Girls' School is a 1935 Indian Bengali-language romantic comedy film directed by Jyotish Bannerjee under the banner of Radha Films Company. It is based on Rabindranath Maitra's 1932 play of the same name. The film stars Tulsi Chakraborty, Jahar Ganguly and Kanan Devi.

== Plot ==
Deciding to start a school for girls named after his wife, the zamindar Damodar Chakraborty looks for a married couple to manage the establishment. Manas Ganguly and Niharika apply for and get the job. The two are not actually married; they posed as a couple to obtain the job. After a series of complications and delicate situations, love blooms between the two and they marry.

== Cast ==
- Tulsi Chakraborty as Damodar Chakraborty
- Jahar Ganguly as Manas
- Kanan Devi as Niharika
- Jyotsna Gupta as Chapala
- Kumar Mitra as Haranidhi

== Production ==
Manmoyee Girls' School was a play written by Rabindranath Maitra and staged by Star Theatres in 1932. Radha Films Company adapted this play into a film under the same name, with Jyotish Bannerjee directing. D. G. Gune was the cinematographer, while the music was composed by Anath Basu, Mrinal Ghosh and Kumar Mitra. The film was shot at Radha Studio.

== Release and reception ==
Manmoyee Girls' School was a success, and was remade again in Bengali under the same title in 1958.
