= Surya Sakkhi =

- Theatrical poster
- Directed by: Agradoot
- Written by: Gauriprasanna Mazumder
- Screenplay by: Kunal Mukherjee; Montu Banerjee; Ashish Sarkar
- Produced by: Bibhuti Laha; Pinaki Choudhury
- Starring: Uttam Kumar; Mahua Roychoudhury; Mrinal Mukherjee
- Cinematography: Baidyanath Basak; Bibhuti Laha
- Edited by: Subodh Roy
- Music by: Prabir Majumdar
- Production company: Manjir Films
- Distributed by: Mayur Movies
- Release date: 1981
- Running time: 133 minutes
- Country: India
- Language: Bengali

Surya Sakkhi (English: The Sun is The Witness) is a 1981 Indian Bengali-language romantic drama film directed by Agradoot. This film was released under the banner of Manjir Films.

== Plot ==
A budding singer's marriage with his childhood sweetheart is in shambles after his ex-girlfriend from college comes back into his life.

== Cast ==
- Uttam Kumar
- Chhaya Devi
- Kamal Mitra
- Mahua Roy Chowdhury
- Biplab Chatterjee
- Shakuntala Barua
- Asit Baran
- Gita Dey
- Mrinal Mukherjee
- Mantu Banerjee
- Dilip Bose
- Haripada Sengupta
- Bappaditya Roy
