= Chandranath (1957 film) =

- Directed by: Kartik Chatterjee
- Written by: Sarat Chandra Chatterjee
- Screenplay by: Keshab Chatterjee; Nazrul Islam (Dialogues - Nripendra Krishna Chatterjee)
- Story by: Sarat Chandra Chatterjee
- Based on: Chandranath by Sarat Chandra Chatterjee
- Produced by: Sachindranath Barik
- Starring: Uttam Kumar; Suchitra Sen; Chhabi Biswas
- Cinematography: Bibhuti Chakraborty
- Edited by: Haridas Mahalanabis
- Music by: Robin Chatterjee (Lyricist - Pranab Roy)
- Production company: Screen Classics Pvt. Ltd
- Distributed by: Narayan Pictures Pvt Ltd
- Release date: 15 November 1957
- Running time: minutes
- Country: India
- Language: Bengali

Chandranath (English: Chandranath) is a 1957 Indian Bengali language romantic drama film under the banner of Screen Classics Private Ltd. It was directed by Kartik Chatterjee, and the music was composed by Robin Chatterjee. The film is based on Sarat Chandra Chatterjee's novel of same name and starring Uttam Kumar in title role with Suchitra Sen in lead and others like Chabi Biswas, Tulsi Chakraborty, and Chandrabati Devi in supporting role. The film became a huge success at the box office.

== Plot ==
Chandranath, a Brahmin of high lineage, lost his father some time ago. As his relationship with his uncle is not good, he moves to the house of one of his father's old servants in Kashi. There he meets Sulochana, a widower, and his daughter Saryu. They work in that servant's house. Saryu falls in love with Chandranath, marries him and returns to his home. But he is angry because he did not tell his uncle and does not go to bless his wife. Her cousin Nirmala comes to her house to see Boudi and loves her new Boudi. Meanwhile, a lustful man named Haridyal Ghoshal sends a letter to his uncle Mani Shankar Mukherjee in this regard. Mani Shankar calls Chandranath and shows him the letter. On learning all this, Chandranath kicks his pregnant wife out of the house. Saryu Moni takes refuge in her uncle's house. She has the child there. Uncle Mani Shankar realizes his mistake and sends Chandranath back to Saryu. He finds that Saryu Moni is at his uncle's house. While there, Chandranath meets his wife and son. Moni Khuro, on the other hand, forgets all about their possible separation and dies of a disease.

== Cast ==
- Uttam Kumar as Chandranath
- Suchitra Sen as Sorju
- Tulsi Chakraborty
- Chandrabati Devi
- Kamal Mitra
- Molina Devi
- Rajlaxmi Devi
- Jahar Ganguly
- Haridhan Mukherjee
- Nitish Mukherjee
- Renuka Ray
- Moni Srimoni
- Padmadevi

== Soundtrack ==
Chandranath

Soundtrack album by Robin Chatterjee
- Released: 1957
- Genre: Feature Film Soundtrack
- Length: 12:55
- Label: Sa Re Ga Ma Pa
- Producer: Sachindranath Barik

Robin Chatterjee chronology
Pathey Holo Deri (1957)	Chandranath (1957)	Tansen (1958)

All lyrics are written by Gouri Prasanna Majumdar, Pranab Roy; all music is composed by Robin Chatterjee.

Songs
No.	Title	Playback	Length
1.	"Smritir Bansari Kar"	Dhananjay Bhattachariya	3:00
2.	"Mor Viru Se Krishnakali"	Sandhya Mukherjee	3:20
3.	"Rajar Dulali Sita"	Hemanta Mukherjee	3:15
4.	"Akash Prithibi Sone"	Hemanta Mukherjee	3:20
Total length:			12:55

== Release ==
This film create a milestone for Bengali cinema. This was the first Indian film which was released at the Metro Cinema Hall. Metro Hall was the most luxurious and expensive cinema hall at that time. Only Hollywood or English films were showing there until then. When the film is released that time just before Harano Sur which was already released and running successfully. Chandranath was released on 15 November 1957.

== Reception ==
There was a long queue and high craze for tickets for the film at the Metro Hall and others hall, and Chandranath ran in metro to full houses for seven consecutive weeks. The film was then released in Darpana, Indira, and Prachi cinemas, where it ran for 91 days. Ticket sales were Rs 2.5 lakh in the film's first week, which was a record collection at the time. The film become all time blockbuster.
