= Gangapada Basu =

Bengali film and theatre actor

- গঙ্গাপদ বসু
- Born: 12 March 1910; Khasial Village, Jessore District, Bengal Presidency, British India (now Kolkata)
- Died: 23 May 1971 (aged 61); Calcutta, West Bengal, India
- Occupations: Theater Actor, Film Actor
- Organization(s): Bohurupee, Gananatya Sangha

Gangapada Basu (a.k.a. Gangapada Bose; 12 March 1910 – 23 May 1971) was a Bengali film and theatre actor. He was an actor in the Gananatya Sangha and Bohurupee theatre groups.

== Films ==
- Tothapi (1950)
- Chinnamul (1950)
- Nagarik (1952)
- Aaj Sandhyay (1953)
- Naba Bidhan (1954)
- Debatra (1955)
- Nishiddha Phal (1955)
- Shreebatsa Chinta (1955)
- Asha (1956)
- Data Karna (1957)
- Prithibi Amare Chaay (1957)
- Ajantrik (1958)
- Jalsaghar (1958)
- Parash Pathar (1958) as Businessman Kachalu
- Kuhak (1960)
- Manik
- Surya Sikha (1963)
- Birieswar Vivekananda (1964)
- Nishi Padma (1970)
- Bibaha Bibhrat (1971)
- Ekhane Pinjar (1971)

== See also ==
- Ritwik Ghatak
