= Drishtidan =

- Directed by: Nitin Bose
- Written by: Rabindranath Tagore
- Screenplay by: Sajanikanta Das (Dialogues)
- Based on: Drishtidan by Rabindranath Tagore
- Produced by: Sunanda Bannerjee
- Starring: Asit Baran; Krishnachandra Dey; Chhabi Biswas; Ketaki Dutta; Uttam Kumar; Sandhyarani
- Cinematography: Radhu Karmakar
- Edited by: Kali Raha
- Music by: Rabindranath Tagore, Timir Baran Bhattachariya
- Production company: S.B Production
- Release date: 31 December 1948
- Country: India
- Language: Bengali

Drishtidan (Bengali: দৃষ্টিদান, Donating Eyes ) (1948) is an Indian Bengali feature film directed by Nitin Bose. Based on Rabindranth Tagore's story of the same name, the film narrates the evolving relationship of a blind woman with her husband. Legendary actor Uttam Kumar debuted in this film, who later became one of the greatest actors in the history of Indian Cinema and the most popular and successful film stars in the history of Bengali Cinema. In this film Kumar played as a child artist of the hero Asit Baran's role. Kumar worked in this film as his birth name Arun Kumar Chatterjee. The film became a flop at the box office.

== Plot ==
Kumudini (Sunanda Banerjee) is being blinded her husband yet her love, affection and sacrifice. Her husband (Asit Baran) is truly unparalleled. Kusum got married at the age of fourteen to a young man studying medicine. Within a year, Kumu fell very ill while giving birth at such a young age and her child died. He is sick but not dying but gradually his eyes develop problems. Her husband was studying medicine at that time. He started treating Kumru's eyes with his clumsy hands. Kumar Bhasur Thakur asked her husband to take special care that Kumar's eyes should not be damaged by treating him in this way.

The two brothers quarreled a lot about this. Kumu knows that her husband is not able to treat her eyes properly but to please him she continues as he says. Kumar Bhasur Thakur secretly wanted to treat him but Kumar refused. Finally trying to save her husband's heart, this young bride becomes blind forever.

Kumu realizes that her husband is responsible for the situation and apologizes to Kumu. She vows that she will never marry again and will have no place in her life for any woman other than her. She expresses hypocritical anger but is extremely happy with her husband. Gradually her husband completed his medical studies and became well known in the medical profession. Her husband started to change gradually as they started to provide a lot of money to their family.

After the quarrel that started between the two brothers over him being blinded, both parties realized their mistake and all the quarrels between the brothers ended. Her husband spends his days happily with Kumu. Kumar's PC mother-in-law wants to remarry Komar Swami with her brother's daughter Hemangi. Gradually he falls in love with Kumura's husband and forgets the promise he once made to her and sets off for marriage. But in the end he can't did it.

== Cast ==
- Sunanda Bannerjee as Kumudini/Kumu
- Asit Baran as Dr Abinash Kumu's husband
- Uttam Kumar as Young Abinash
- Krishnachandra Dey
- Chhabi Biswas
- Ketaki Dutta as Young Kumu
- Sandhyarani

== Soundtrack ==
Drishtidan

Soundtrack album by K.C Dey, Asit Baran, Supriti Ghosh
- Released: 1948
- Recorded: 1948
- Studio: S.B Production
- Genre: Feature film soundtrack
- Length: 0:06:04
- Label: Pendujatt
- Producer: Sunanda Bannerjee

All lyrics are written by Rabindranath Tagore; all music is composed by Rabindranath Tagore, Timir Baran Bhattachariya.

Songs
No.	Title	Playback	Length
1.	"Tomra Ja Balo Tai Balo"	K.C Dey	3:18
2.	"Se Kon Boner Harin"	Asit Baran, Supriti Ghosh	2:46
Total length:			06:04
