= Khokababur Pratyabartan =

Bengali film

Khokababur Pratyabortan
- Directed by: Agradoot
- Written by: Rabindranath Tagore
- Screenplay by: Binoy Chatterjee
- Based on: Khokababur Pratyabortan short story by Rabindranath Tagore
- Produced by: Agradoot
- Starring: Uttam Kumar; Asit Baran; Jahar Ganguly
- Cinematography: Bibhuti Laha, Bijoy Ghosh
- Edited by: Baidyanath Chatterjee
- Music by: Hemanta Mukherjee
- Production company: Agradoot chitra
- Distributed by: Paroshmal Deepchand Release
- Release date: 20 October 1961
- Running time: 103 minutes
- Country: India
- Language: Bengali

Khokababur Pratyabartan (English: The Return of Little Master) is a 1960 Indian Bengali-language social drama film directed by Agradoot (Note: The pen name of a group of Indian film technicians in Bengali cinema signing collectively as director.) based on the 1891 short story of the same name by Rabindranath Tagore. The film stars Uttam Kumar in the lead with Asit Baran, Sumita Sanyal and others in supporting role. This film was released on 28 April 1960 under the banner of Agradoot Chitra. Music direction of the film was done by Hemanta Mukherjee. The film is remember as one of the best films of Uttam's career. His performance as a servant was greatly acclaimed. The film was a hit at the box office.

== Plot ==
The plot revolves around Raicharan's tragic life. He is the obedient servant of a local zamindar and takes care of zamindar's son whom he addresses as Khokababu. One day, the little son dies in an accident in a river flood and he is blamed for the same. In a delusional state, Raicharan starts believing his own infant to be his much loved khokababu and brought him up only to return him to his master.

== Cast ==
- Uttam Kumar as Raicharan
- Tulsi Chakraborty
- Sumita Sanyal as Raicharan's wife
- Asit Baran as Anukul
- Jahar Ganguly as Raicharan's Father
- Shobha Sen as Raicharan's Sister
- Sisir Batabyal
- Dipti Ray
- Master Babu as Khokababu
- Tilak Chakraborty

== Soundtrack ==
Khokababur Pratyabortan

Soundtrack album by Hemanta Mukherjee
- Released: 1960
- Recorded: 1959
- Studio: Agradoot
- Genre: Feature film soundtrack
- Length: 2:38
- Label: Angel Digital Pvt Ltd
- Producer: Agradoot

Hemanta Mukherjee chronology
Kuhak (1960)	Khokababur Pratyabortan (1960)	Sesh Paryanta (1961)

All lyrics are written by Rabindranath Tagore; all music is composed by Rabindranath Tagore.

Songs
No.	Title	Playback	Length
1.	"Tar Anta Nai Go"	Hemanta Mukherjee	2:38
Total length:			2:38

Only Rabindra Sangeet used in this film to help by Rabindra Bharati.

== Reception ==
The Times of India wrote "Want to discover Mahanayak's unmatched acting skills beyond romantic hits? You have to watch ‘Khokababur Pratyabartan’. It's not an easy task for a charismatic lead actor to jump into the role of a next door loyal servant. Because of the screen adaptation of a famous story of Rabindranath Tagore, it was more difficult to maintain the authentic feel of the story. Uttam Kumar excelled it so well that it is still regarded as one of the most touching Bengali films ever created."

The film become hit at the box office. It's also remembered as the first successful film based on Rabindranath Tagore story.
