= Pathey Holo Deri =

1957 film

- Directed by: Agradoot
- Written by: Nitai Bhattacharya (Dialogues)
- Screenplay by: Agradoot
- Story by: Pratibha Bose
- Produced by: Agradoot
- Starring: Shishir Batabyal; Anil Bhattacharya; Mihir Bhattacharya; Uttam Kumar; Chhabi Biswas; Bharati Devi; Chandrabati Devi; Jahar Ganguli
- Cinematography: Bibhuti Laha
- Edited by: Baidyanath Chatterjee
- Music by: Robin Chatterjee
- Production company: Agradoot Chitra
- Distributed by: Parashmal Deepchand Release
- Release date: 5 December 1957 (India)
- Running time: 147 min.
- Country: India
- Language: Bengali

Pathey Holo Deri is a 1957 Bengali romantic drama film directed by Agradoot. The film's music was composed by Robin Chatterjee. The film stars Uttam Kumar, and Suchitra Sen in leading role and others artists like Shishir Batabyal, Anil Bhattacharya, Mihir Bhattacharya, Chhabi Biswas, 4, Chandrabati Devi, Jahar Ganguli, Anup Kumar, Shyam Laha, Gopal Majumdar, Chitra Mandal, Sova Sen, and Kamala Mukherjee in the supporting roles. This is the first ever color Bengali film in history. The film became a huge success at the box office.

== Plot ==
The story follows Jayanta, a poor doctor, who falls in love with Mallika, the granddaughter of a wealthy man. Mallika helps Jayanta by giving him her mother's jewellery in order to fund his study of medicine in Europe. However, her grandfather, who is against their relationship, creates misunderstandings between the two and plans to wed Mallika off to another man. Things change when Jayanta comes back to find Mallika in a psychotic vegetative state resulting out of the anxiety and depression of being estranged from him. He sets out on a mission to devote all his life to cure her.

== Cast ==
- Uttam Kumar as Jayanta
- Suchitra Sen as Mallika
- Shishir Batabyal
- Anil Bhattacharya
- Mihir Bhattacharya
- Chhabi Biswas
- Bharati Devi
- Chandrabati Devi
- Jahar Ganguli
- Anup Kumar
- Shyam Laha
- Gopal Majumdar
- Chitra Mandal
- Sova Sen
- Kamala Mukherjee

== Soundtrack ==
Pothey Holo Deri

Soundtrack album by Robin Chatterjee
- Released: 1957
- Genre: Feature Film Soundtrack
- Length: 0:17:10
- Label: Angel Digital Pvt Ltd
- Producer: Agradoot

Robin Chatterjee chronology
Har Jeet (1957)	Pothey Holo Deri (1957)	Chandranath (1957 film) (1957)

Robin Chatterjee composed the songs for the film and Gouri Prasanna Majumdar has written the lyrics. The songs became very popular and are famous even today. They are considered as timeless classics.

song title
No.	Title	singer(s)	Length
1.	"Aro Kichukhan Na Hoy Rahita Kache"	Sandhya Mukherjee	3:08
2.	"E Sudhu Ganer Din"	Sandhya Mukherjee	3:32
3.	"Ei Sanjhara Lagane"	Sandhya Mukherjee	3:36
4.	"Polash Ar Krishanachura"	Sandhya Mukherjee	2:54
5.	"Kakoli Kujane"	Alpana Banerjee	3:00
Total length:			17:10

== Reception ==
This was a milestone film for Bengali Cinema. This was the first ever color Bengali film in history shot in Gevacolor. The film received mixed reviews at that time. The Times of India wrote With their sheer charisma and chemistry, Uttam-Suchitra used to beat any other on-screen couple hollow. Their classic romantic films together are a treat to watch even today and ‘Pathey Holo Deri’ seems to be no exception.
