= Uttar Falguni =

1963 Indian Bengali film by Asit Sen

- Poster
- Directed by: Asit Sen
- Written by: Nihar Ranjan Gupta
- Screenplay by: Nripendra Krishna Chatterjee
- Story by: Nihar Ranjan Gupta
- Produced by: Uttam Kumar
- Starring: Suchitra Sen; Bikash Roy
- Cinematography: Anil Gupta; Jyoti Laha
- Edited by: Tarun Dutta
- Music by: Robin Chatterjee
- Production company: Uttam Kumar Films Pvt Ltd
- Distributed by: Chayabani Pvt Ltd
- Release date: 11 October 1963
- Running time: 137 minutes
- Country: India
- Language: Bengali

Uttar Falguni (transl. Latter Reddish One) is a 1963 Indian Bengali-language drama film directed by Asit Sen and produced by Uttam Kumar, starring Suchitra Sen in a double role, Bikash Roy and Dilip Mukherjee in lead. At the 11th National Film Awards, the film was awarded the National Film Award for Best Feature Film in Bengali. Music of the film composed by Robin Chatterjee. The film was remade by director Asit Sen himself in Hindi, as Mamta (1966) again with Suchitra Sen as the lead. The film was also remade in Tamil as Kaviya Thalaivi (1970), and in Malayalam as Pushpanjali (1972).

== Plot ==
Debjani (Suchitra Sen) is forced to marry the rakish Rakhal (Kalipada Chakraborty) who then tries to initiate her into prostitution. Pregnant with Rakhal’s child, she escapes from him and while on the train, she tries to commit suicide but is rescued by the madam of a singing house (Chhaya Devi) and brought to her kotha in Lucknow, where she gives birth to a daughter, Suparna, and becomes the tawaif Pannabai.As Rakhal traces her out continues to harass and blackmail her, she escapes once again to Calcutta and has Suparna admitted in a missionary school and distances herself from her so that her daughter can grow up in a good, clean environment. She meets her former lover, a barrister, Manish Roy (Bikash Roy) who, after hearing her tragic tale, wants to marry her but Debjani will not let him soil his name. She however asks him to take care of Suparna. Manish agrees, becoming Suparna’s guardian. Years Pass. Pannabai is now older with a heart ailment. The adult Suparna (Suchitra Sen again), brought up by Manish as his niece, returns from abroad, also having become a lawyer, who is in love with her senior Indranil (Dilip Mukherjee), Manish’s assistant. When Rakhal realizes that Suparna is his daughter, he comes back to blackmail Debjani, threatening to expose Suparna’s true identity. Debjani shoots him dead. In court, she is defended by Manish. Suparna is against Manish taking this case of a characterless, fallen woman whom she despises but when Manish tells her Debjani’s true story and reveals her true identity to her, she defends Debjani in court…

== Cast ==
- Suchitra Sen as Debjani / Pannabai and Suparna
- Bikash Roy as Manish Roy
- Chhaya Devi as Baijee
- Dilip Mukherjee as Indranil
- Padmadevi as Indranil's mother
- Kalipada Chakraborty as Rakhalbabu
- Pahari Sanyal as Barrister
- Jahar Ganguli as Debjani's father
- Sita Mukherjee as Mother Mamen
- Ajit Bandyopadhyay
- Renuka Roy

== Soundtrack ==
All music is composed by Robin Chatterjee.

No.	Title	Playback	Length
1.	"Kaun Tarah Se Tum"	Sandhya Mukherjee	3:13
2.	"Tore Naina Lage"	Sandhya Mukherjee, Chhaya Devi	2:57
3.	"Tum Chatur Medley"	Sandhya Mukherjee	2:42
4.	"Zindagi Ki Ek Bhool"	Sandhya Mukherjee	3:23
Total length:			12:12

== Reception ==
This is the fourth film produced by Uttam Kumar but for the first time he did not act in his home production. He gave the opportunity to Bikash Roy as he felt that the story and audience perspective favoured Bikash Roy for the role. The film became a blockbuster hit at the box office and ran for 105 days in theatres.

== Awards ==
- 1964: National Film Award for Best Feature Film in Bengali - Uttam Kumar (As producer)
- 1964: BFJA Best Actress Award - Suchitra Sen

== Remakes ==
The film was remade in Hindi in 1966 as Mamta where Asit Sen directed again and Suchitra Sen reprised her role. Later the film remade in Tamil as Kaviya Thalaivi in 1970 and in Malayalam as Pushpanjali in 1972.
