= Trijama =

- Directed by: Agradoot (Note: The pen name of a group of Indian film technicians in Bengali cinema signing collectively as director.)
- Written by: Subodh Ghosh (Dialogues)
- Screenplay by: Agradoot; Nitai Bhattacharya; Subodh Ghosh
- Based on: Trijama by Subodh Ghosh
- Starring: Uttam Kumar; Suchitra Sen; Anubha Gupta
- Cinematography: Bijoy Ghosh; Bibhuti Laha
- Edited by: Santosh Ganguli
- Music by: Nachiketa Ghosh
- Production company: Sunrise Films
- Distributed by: Cine Films
- Release date: 28 June 1956 (India)
- Running time: 132 minutes
- Country: India
- Language: Bengali

Trijama (English: Three Facets) is a 1956 Indian Bengali-language romantic drama film directed by Agradoot, based on Subodh Ghosh's novel of the same name. This film was released under the banner of Sunrise Films. Music direction of the film was made by Nachiketa Ghosh. The film stars Uttam Kumar and Suchitra Sen in lead roles. It's critically acclaimed but became a semi hit at the box office. But in 1960s when the film was re-released it became a huge blockbuster hit at the box office.

== Plot ==
This is the story of Swarupa (Suchitra), a girl who is unable to get Kushal's (Uttam Kumar) attention, no matter how hard she tries. She is a quiet person and suffers in silence. Kushal favours another woman, Abala (Anubha Gupta), who is both rich and beautiful. However, when he suddenly loses everything, Abala leaves him for a richer man. This acts as an eye-opener, and Kushal soon returns to where he belongs: the world of Swarupa.

== Cast ==
- Uttam Kumar as Kushal
- Suchitra Sen as Swarupa
- Chhabi Biswas as Kushal's Father
- Anubha Gupta as Nabala
- Kamal Mitra as Nabala's Father
- Chandrabati Devi as Kushal's Mother
- Chhaya Devi as Abala's Mother
- Haridhan Mukhopadhyay
- Jiben Bose
- Sobha Sen
- Nitish Mukherjee as Ramji
- Jahar Ganguly
- Dhiresh Banerjee
- Mihir Bhattacharya
- Ketaki Dutta

== Soundtrack ==
Trijama

Soundtrack album by Nachiketa Ghosh
- Released: 1956
- Recorded: 1955
- Studio: Sunrise Films
- Genre: Feature Film Soundtrack
- Length: 0:15:18
- Label: Angel Digital Private Limited

Nachiketa Ghosh chronology
Asamapto (1956)	Trijama (1956)	Nabajanma (1956)

The music for the film was composed by Nachiketa Ghosh and lyrics were penned by Gouri Prasanna Majumdar. The songs become very popular and are famous even today.

Song title
No.	Title	singer(s)	Length
1.	"Dhup Chirodin"	Sandhya Mukherjee	3:07
2.	"Jhiri Jhiri Piyaler"	Sandhya Mukherjee	3:13
3.	"Matite Chandramallicka"	Sandhya Mukherjee	3:13
4.	"Pakhir Kujan Shune"	Sandhya Mukherjee	3:25
5.	"Ram Do Sharir"	Hemanta Mukherjee	3:00
Total length:			15:58
