= Bipasha (film) =

1962 film

- Directed by: Agradoot
- Written by: Tarasankar Bandyopadhyay
- Screenplay by: Gouriprasanna Majumder (Lyrics also) and Hindi Dialogues - Pandit Bhusan
- Based on: Bipasha novel by Tarashankar Bandopadhyay
- Starring: Uttam Kumar; Suchitra Sen
- Cinematography: Bijoy Ghosh, Bibhuti Laha
- Edited by: Baidyanath Chatterjee
- Music by: Robin Chatterjee
- Production company: Chitra Prayojok
- Distributed by: Chandimata Films Private Limited
- Release date: 1 January 1962
- Running time: 133 minutes
- Country: India
- Language: Bengali

Bipasha is a 1962 Indian Bengali-language drama film starring Uttam Kumar and Suchitra Sen. and directed by Agradoot. The film is based on a novel titled Bipasha by Sri Tarashankar Bandyopadhay.The story fleetingly describes the horror of riots in West Pakistan during the time of Partition of India.

It is one of the many hit films in which Uttam Kumar and Suchitra Sen worked as a pair. The other cast members included Chhabi Biswas, Chhaya Devi, Pahari Sanyal, Jiben Bose and Tulsi Chakrabarti.

== Plot ==
The storyline unfolds when Dibyendu Chattopadhyay (Uttam Kumar) the young engineer meets Bipasha Bhattacharya (Suchitra Sen) in today's Maithon. Their acquaintance soon reaches a stage when the young couple decide to get married. However, on the night of her marriage to Dibyendu the latter fails to turn up due to a message sent to him by his uncle. Bipasha finds out Dibyendu's uncle and tracks him to Allahabad. Bipasha later finds that there were allegations against the moral character of Dibyendu's mother (Chhaya Devi).

The film revolves around the story of redemption of honour of Dibyendu's mother's in the eyes of society. It became known by the end of the film that Dibyendu's father (Chhabi Biswas) had been in an affair with and thereafter married an English girl. To save himself from being imprisoned for bigamy, he alleged that his wife (Dibyendu's mother) was unfaithful, and refused to acknowledge his own son (Dibyendu) as legitimate.

== Cast ==
- Uttam Kumar as Dibyendu Chattopadhyay
- Suchitra Sen as Bipasha Bhattacharya
- Chhabi Biswas as Swamiji alias Dibyendu's father
- Chhaya Debi as Dibyendu's mother
- Nitish Mukherjee as Maternal Uncle to Dibyendu
- Pahari Sanyal as Barrister, a friend of Dibyendu's father
- Tulsi Chakrabarti as Paan Shop Owner
- Jiben Bose as Dibyendu's co-worker and a friend
- Lily Chakravarty as Jashoda, Bipasha's classmate and friend
- Kamal Mitra as Hardayal Singh

== Production ==
For this role Suchitra Sen got the payment of rupees one lakh and became the highest paid actor/actress in Bengali cinema at that time, while Uttam Kumar got the payment of rupees eighty thousands. After this film Suchitra Sen permanently fixed her salary of one lakh.

== Soundtrack ==
Bipasha

Soundtrack album by Robin Chatterjee
- Released: 1962
- Recorded: 1961
- Studio: Chitra Prayojok
- Length: 0:09:29
- Label: Angel Digital Pvt Ltd

Robin Chatterjee chronology
Shuno Baranari (1961)	Bipasha (1962)	Surya Sikha (1963)

All lyrics are written by Gouri Prasanna Majumdar; all music is composed by Robin Chatterjee.

Songs
No.	Title	Playback	Length
1.	"Ami Swapne Tomay"	Sandhya Mukherjee	3:17
2.	"Klantir Path"	Sandhya Mukherjee	3:10
3.	"Rajani Pohalo"	Sandhya Mukherjee	3:02
Total length:			9:29

== Reception ==
This film become blockbuster hit and ran over 80 days in theaters and this is one of the biggest hit of Uttam Suchitra pair. The film become highest grossing Bengali film in 1962. In an article honoring the actors 35 years after Uttam Kumar's death, The Indian Express wrote "Suchitra Sen, Uttam Kumar heralded the golden era of Bengali cinema", and listed Bipasha as among their most popular films. The Telegraph listed it among the duo's "string of memorable hits", and when speaking the two as box office draws, The Pioneer listed at as among their biggest hits.
