= Sabar Uparey =

- DVD cover
- Directed by: Agradoot
- Written by: Nitai Bhattacharya (Dialogues)
- Screenplay by: Agradoot; Nitai Bhattacharya
- Story by: Nitai Bhattacharya
- Based on: Beyond This Place by A.J. Cronin
- Produced by: Deepchand Kankriya
- Starring: Uttam Kumar; Suchitra Sen; Chhabi Biswas
- Cinematography: Bibhuti Laha; Bijoy Ghosh
- Edited by: Santosh Ganguli
- Music by: Robin Chatterjee
- Production company: M. P. Productions Pvt. Ltd
- Distributed by: D Looks Films Distributor
- Release date: 1 December 1955
- Running time: 157 minutes
- Country: India
- Language: Bengali

Sabar Uparey (Bengali pronunciation: [ʃaˈbaɾ uˈpaɾe] transl. Beyond All) is a 1955 Indian Bengali-language crime thriller film produced by M.P Production Private Ltd and directed by Agradoot, based on A.J. Cronin's 1953 novel, Beyond This Place. It stars Uttam Kumar and Suchitra Sen in leading roles. Chhabi Biswas, Pahari Sanyal and Nitish Mukherjee also play important roles in the movie. The music was composed by Robin Chatterjee. The movie was remade in Hindi as Kala Pani asin 1958. It was also remade in Tamil as Nalla Theerpu starring Gemini Ganesan in 1959.

== Plot ==
Prashanta Chatterjee (Chhabi Biswas) is sentenced to life imprisonment after the alleged murder of Hemangini, a lady based in Krishnanagar whom he is accused of loving and then dumping and murdering heinously.

Twelve years later, his only son Shankar (Uttam Kumar), who lives with his mother (Sobha Sen) in Patna, comes to Krishnanagar to prove his father's innocence and bring the actual perpetrators to justice. There he falls in love with Rita (Suchitra Sen), a girl who too had a life history of injustice. Together, they secretly conjure up various evidences against the actual criminal, a government lawyer (Nitish Mukherjee) who originally fought the case against his father 12 years back. In all this, they get the help of Rita's journalist brother (Pahari Sanyal) who, through his articles and friends in the media, gathers public momentum to finally reopen the case.

Shankar presents the case himself and through various evidences and tact presentations, successfully pleads in favour of his father and proves the involvement of the actual criminal, the government lawyer, who killed Hemangini to benefit from a huge insurance in her name. Prashanta Choudhury is acquitted. After 12 years of wretched life in prison and the thought that his wife and child had perished due to poverty, he seems to have lost his mental balance. However, in the midst of his family, sense and wellness return to him. He thanks Rita's brother for his immense help and asks his sister's hand for his son Shankar.

== Cast ==
- Uttam Kumar as Shankar Chatterjee
- Suchitra Sen as Rita
- Chhabi Biswas as Prashanta Chatterjee, Shankar's father
- Pahari Sanyal as Rita's brother, a journalist
- Nitish Mukherjee as Government lawyer
- Sobha Sen as Mahamaya, Shankar's mother
- Jayashree Sen as Bina
- Bithi Dasgupta
- Bishweshwar Bhattacharya

== Soundtrack ==
Sabar Uparey

Soundtrack album by Robin Chatterjee
- Released: 1955
- Recorded: 1955
- Studio: M.P Production Pvt Ltd
- Length: 0:06:44
- Label: SA RE GA MA PA
- Producer: Tarak Pal

Robin Chatterjee chronology
Godhuli (1955)	Sabar Uparey (1955)	Dhake Ki Malmal (1956)

All lyrics are written by Gouri Prasanna Majumdar; all music is composed by Robin Chatterjee.

Songs
No.	Title	Playback	Length
1.	"Ghum Ghum Chand"	Sandhya Mukherjee	3:18
2.	"Janina Phurabe Kobe"	Sandhya Mukherjee	3:26
Total length:			6:44

== Reception ==
=== Reviews ===
The Times of India wrote Bengal has no doubt gifted so many great names in acting and entertainment, some far more talented than the duo. Still, time hasn’t worn down the sweet memory of Uttam-Suchitra. The why’s and how’s of their chemistry mystified a generation that saw the pairing as romantic legends.

=== Box office ===
The film became critically acclaimed and a huge blockbuster at the box office and ran for 100 days in theatres. The film collected five times from the budget. This is also one of the highest grossing Bengali film of 1955.

=== Remake ===
The film was remade in Hindi in 1958 as Kala Pani, produced and starring Dev Anand in his banner Navketan Films, with Madhubala playing the female lead.
