= Sandhya Mukherjee =

Indian playback singer and musician (1931–2022)

Geetashree Sandhya Mukherjee
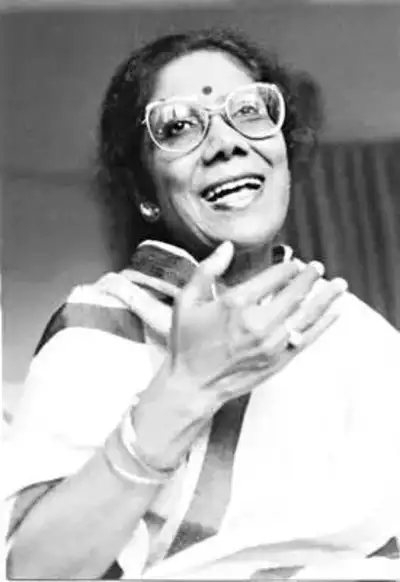
- Sandhya Mukherjee in 1980

Background information
- Born: Sandhya Mukherjee; 4 October 1931; Calcutta, Bengal Presidency, British Raj
- Died: 15 February 2022 (aged 90) Kolkata, West Bengal, India
- Genre: Playback singing
- Occupations: Singer, composer
- Spouse: Shyamal Gupta

Sandhya Mukhopadhyay singing "Gane more kon Indrodhonu"
Music composer Anupam Ghatak, Lyricist Gauriprasanna Majumdar, Singer Sandhya Mukhopadhyay

Geetashree Sandhya Mukherjee (Note: Also spelled Mukhopadhyay; Bengali pronunciation: [ʃond̪ʱa mukʰopad̪ʱːae̯].) (Bengali pronunciation: [ʃond̪ʱa mukʰopad̪ʱːae̯]; 4 October 1931 – 15 February 2022) was an Indian playback singer and musician, specialising in Bengali music. She received Banga Bibhushan, the highest civilian honour of the Indian state of West Bengal in 2011. She also won the National Film Award for Best Female Playback Singer for her songs in the films Jay Jayanti and Nishi Padma in the year 1970.

== Early and personal life ==
Mukherjee was born in Dhakuria, Calcutta, on 4 October 1931 to Narendranath Mukherjee, a railway official, and Hemprova Devi. She was the youngest of six children. Her grandfather was a police officer, and the family had lived in Dhakuria since 1911. She was married to noted lyrist Shyamal Gupta, until his death in 2010. She has a daughter named Soumi Sengupta.

== Training and career ==
Sandhya started her music training under the direction of Pandit Santosh Kumar Basu, Professor A T Kannan, and Professor Chinmoy Lahiri. However, her guru was Ustad Bade Ghulam Ali Khan, followed by his son Ustad Munawar Ali Khan, under whom she mastered Indian classical music. According to Manorma Sharma, "Sandhya has been able to maintain her popularity as a classical vocalist even after acquiring the gloss and the glow of playback singing ..."

Though classically trained, the bulk of her work consists of Bengali modern songs. She began her career in Mumbai singing Hindi songs, starting with a song in the film Taarana in 1950. She sang, as a playback singer, in 17 Hindi films. She decided to come back to and settle in her home city Kolkata in 1952 for personal reasons. She married Bengali poet Shyamal Gupta in 1966. Gupta went on to write the lyrics for many of her songs.

Her best known collaboration is arguably with the Bengali singer Hemanta Mukherjee with whom she sang numerous duets, primarily as playback for Bengali films. Hemanta and Sandhya became known as the voices behind the pairings of the Bengali superstar Uttam Kumar and his numerous heroines, most notably being the actress Suchitra Sen, whose singing voice she became. Besides Hemanta Mukherjee's compositions, her largest body of work is with Robin Chattopadhyay and Nachiketa Ghosh.

During the Bangladesh Liberation War she joined the mass movement among Indian Bengali artistes to raise money for the millions of refugees who had poured into Kolkata and West Bengal to escape the fighting, and to raise global awareness for the cause of Bangladesh. She assisted Bangladeshi musician Samar Das as he set up the Swadhin Bangla Betar Kendra, the clandestine radio station broadcasting to Bangladesh and recorded several patriotic songs for him. On the occasion of the release of Sheikh Mujibur Rahman, the imprisoned leader of the new country of Bangladesh, she released a song Bangabandhu Tumi Phirey Ele. She later became one of the first foreign artists to visit Dhaka, performing at an open-air concert in Paltan Maidan in Dhaka to celebrate the first Ekushey February after Bangladeshi independence in 1971.

On 26 January 2022, on the Republic Day and a few days before testing positive for COVID-19, Mukherjee was awarded the Padma Shri for her performance in music. However, she refused the award, labelling it "disparaging and degrading". Mukherjee died of cardiac arrest and COVID-19 complications at a private hospital in Kolkata on 15 February 2022, at the age of 90.

== Songs ==
Year	Film	Song(s)	Music director	Lyrics	Language	Co-singer(s)
1945	Non Film	Girin Chakrabarti	"Tumi firaye diyachho", "Tomar akashe jhilmil kore"	Bengali		
1948	Anjangarh	"Ab Nahi Dharat Dheer Dheer"	R C Boral		Hindi	
1948	Anjangarh	R C Boral	"Ramdhun", "Gun gun mor gaan"	Bengali		
1948	Sabyasachi		Robin Chattopadhyay		Bengali	
1948	Samapika	"Manusher mone bhor holo aj", "Protima goriya debota cheyechhi", "Amare loye je", "Ami shudhu bangi"	Robin Chattopadhyay		Bengali	
1948	Abhiman	Ramchandra Pal				
1949	Bidushi Bharja					
1949	Chota Bhai	"Ramdhun"	Pankaj Mullick		Hindi	
1949	Swami	Hemanta Mukherjee		Bengali		
1950	Pehla Admi	R C Boral		Hindi		
1950	Non Film	Shyamal Mitra	"Ogo mor geetimoy"	Bengali		
1951	Sazaa	S D Burman	"Aa Gupchup Gupchup Pyar Karen" "Ye Baat Koi Samjhaye Re"	Hindi		
1951	Taraana	Anil Biswas	"Bol Papihe Bol Kaun Hai Tera Chitchor"	Hindi		
1952	Izzat	Bulo C Rani	"Ishq Me Ho Jao Barbaad" "Kya Kya Sitam Sahe Hain Do Din Ki Zindagi Me" "Tera Jhoomta Shabaab Jaise"	Hindi		
1953	Baaghi	Madan Mohan	"Jungle Mangal"	Hindi		
1953	Ek Do Teen	Vinod	"Aa Jaa Re Balam Tujhe Meri Kasam"	Hindi		
1953	Fareb	Anil Biswas	"Udaasiyon Me Nazar Kho Gai"	Hindi		
1953	Husn Ka Chor	Bulo C Rani	"Dheere Dheere Dil Me Samaa" "Dil Lagaane Wale Apne Se Hazaaron Hain" "O Jaane Waale Kisi Ka Salaam Leta Jaa" "O Sangdil Zamaane Mujkhe Kyun Rulaata Hai"	Hindi		
1954	Manohar	S Venkat Raman	"Aayee Basant Ritu Aayee Bahaar Leke" "Doob Gaye Sab Aas Ke Taare" "Rut Hai Suhaani Raat Jawan Hai" "Sukh Bhari Duniya Meri Barbaad Jo"	Hindi		
1956	Jaagte Raho	Salil Choudhary	"Maine Jo Lee Angrayee Teri Mehfil"	Hindi		
1966	Mamta	Roshan	"Tose Naina Laage Re Saanwariya"	Hindi		
1970	Jai jayanti		"Jhana jhanana Sur jhankare"	Bengali		
			"Mone Mone Gatha Mala"			
			"Shaon Elo Oi Thoi Thoi"			
			"Projapoti Mon Amar"			
			"Tumi Nahoy Rahite Kachhe"			
			"Mor Bhiru Se Krishnakali"			
			"Madhumaloti Dake Aay"			
			"Polash Amar Krishnachura"			
			"Bashi Go Bole Papiya"			
			"Lalita Go Bole Di"			
			"Holud Gandar Phool"			
			"Ei Sanjhjhara Lagane"			
			"Dhanya Hobo Je Ami"			
			"Ebare Bujjechi Ami"			
			"Ami Tomare Bhalobesechi"			
			"Mayabati Meghe Elo Tandra"			
	Non film		"O Re Jeenewale"			
			"Ogu Sindur Ranga Megh"			
			"Shankha Bajiye Make"			
			"Ni Sa Ga Ma Pa"			
			"Piya Piya Piya Ke Dake Amare"			
			"O Bak Bakum Paira"			
			"Badho Jhulona"			
			"E Je Bangla"			
			"Tumi Je Amar Pratham Rater"			
			"Aha Ki Misti"			
1961	Saptapadi	Hemanta Kumar Mukhopadhyay	"Ei Path Jadi Na Sesh Hoy"			
			"He Sagar Keno Tomay Nil Dekhi"			
			"Aaj Keno O Chokh Lal"			
			"Ke Tumi Amare Dako"			
			"Gane Mor Kon Indradhanu"			
			"Boro Derite Tumi"			
			"Tumi To Janona"			
			"Champa Chameli"			
			"Se Gan Jai Je Bhule"			
			"Boro Derite Tumi Bujhle"			
			"Ogo Momo Prano Hay"			
			"Ore O Bijan Baner Pakhi"			
			E Shudhu Ganer Din"			
			"Kichhu Khushi Kichhu Nesha"			
			"Moner Madhuri Mishaye"			
			"Shuno Shuno Ei Raat"			
			"Aar Dekona Ei Modhu Name"			
			"Tari Bhese Jay"			
			"Na Jani Kon Chhande"			
			"Sharame Jorano Akhi"			
			"E Sundar Ratri"			
			"Ekti Sukher Neer"			
			"Prabhat Surja"			
			"Aaj Holi Khelbo Shyam"			
			"Ore Sokal Sona"			
			"Bah Chharata To Besh"			
			"Shyamal Barani Ogo Kanya"			
			"Prantateri Gaan Amar"			
		Salil Chowdhury	"Ujjal Ekjhak Payra"			
			"Shraban Ajhare Jhare"			
			"Aay Bristy Jhepe"			
			"Jare Ja Phire Ja"			
			"Gungun Mon Bhomra"			
			"Jibone Ja Kichu Chilo"			
			"Jodi Naam Dhore Take Daaki"			
			"Godhulir Shanto Chhayay"			
			"Ke Jeno Pother Majhe"			
			"Guru Guru"			
			"Sajani Go Kotha Shono"			
			"Sajani Go Sajani"			
			"Kichu Aar Kahibo Na"			
			"O Neel Neel Payra"			
1965	Saiyan Se Bhaile Milanwa	"Dhire Dhire Bole"	Robin Chatterjee	P. L. Santoshi	Bhojpuri	Mohammed Rafi

== Bengali film songs ==
Year	Film	Song	Composer(s)	Lyricist	Co-singer
1950	Se Nilo Biday	"Tobo Moner Modhubone"	Subal Dasgupta		solo
1950	Se Nilo Biday	"Amar Surer Dheu Legechhe"	Subal Dasgupta		solo
1955	Hrad	"Chand Dube Gele"	Manabendra Mukhopadhyay		solo
1955	Sabar Uparey	"Ghum Ghum Chand"	Robin Chatterjee	Gauriprasanna Mazumdar	solo
1955	Sabar Uparey	"Janina Phurabe Kobe"	Robin Chatterjee	Gauriprasanna Mazumdar	solo
1956	Asamapta	"Bauri Hoyeche Aaj Sreeradha"	Nachiketa Ghosh		solo
1956	Asamapta	"Monobeena Baaje"	Nachiketa Ghosh		solo
1956	Asamapta	"Eto Bhabini Konodin"	Nachiketa Ghosh		solo
1956	Ekti Raat	"Kakon Bole Shrimoti Tobe"	Anupam Ghatak		solo
1956	Ekti Raat	"O Bashi Daake"	Anupam Ghatak		solo
1956	Ekti Raat	"Prodiper Shikha Keno Kaape"	Anupam Ghatak		solo
1956	Ek Din Ratre	"Se Gaan Ami"	Salil Chowdhury		solo
1956	Shankar Narayan Bank	"Etodin Pore Tomaro Poth"	Anupam Ghatak		solo
1956	Trijama	"Pakhir Kujon Kunje"	Hemanta Mukherjee		solo
1956	Trijama	"Dhup Chirodin"	Hemanta Mukherjee		solo
1956	Trijama	"Jhiri Jhiri Piyaler"	Hemanta Mukherjee		solo
1956	Trijama	"Matite Chandramallika"	Hemanta Mukherjee		solo
1956	Raat Bhore	"Bone Noy Mone Aaj"	Satinath Mukherjee		solo
1956	Raat Bhore	"Rimjhim Jhim Taale"	Satinath Mukherjee		solo
1956	Shilpi	"Tumi Je Amar"	Robin Chatterjee	Pranab Raha	solo
1956	Shilpi	"Nupurer Gunjone"	Robin Chatterjee	Pranab Raha	solo
1957	Chandranath	"Mor Bheeru Se Krishnokoli"	Robin Chatterjee	Gauriprasanna Mazumdar	solo
1957	Jatra Holo Shuru	"E Gaan Gaoa Mor"			solo
1957	Jatra Holo Shuru	"Jadubhare Naina Tore"			solo
1957	Pathe Holo Deri	"Polash Aar Krishnachura"	Robin Chatterjee	Gauriprasanna Mazumdar	solo
1957	Pathe Holo Deri	"Ei Sajhero Logone"	Robin Chatterjee	Gauriprasanna Mazumdar	solo
1957	Pathe Holo Deri	"Tumi Nahoy Rohite Kachhe"	Robin Chatterjee	Gauriprasanna Mazumdar	solo
1957	Pathe Holo Deri	"E Shudhu Gaaner Din"	Robin Chatterjee	Gauriprasanna Mazumdar	solo
1959	Sonar Harin	"Ei Je Chander Alo"	Hemanta Mukherjee	Gauriprasanna Mazumdar	solo
1961	Saptapadi	"Ei Poth Jodi Na Shesh Hoy"	Hemanta Mukherjee	Gauriprasanna Mazumdar	Hemanta Mukherjee
1961	Saptapadi	"Ei Poth Jodi Na Shesh Hoy" (female)	Hemanta Mukherjee	Gauriprasanna Mazumdar	solo
1962	Bipasha	"Ami Swapne Tomay Dekhechi"	Robin Chatterjee	Gauriprasanna Mazumdar	solo
1962	Bipasha	"Klantir Poth"	Robin Chatterjee	Gauriprasanna Mazumdar	solo
1962	Bipasha	"Rojoni Pohalo"	Robin Chatterjee	Gauriprasanna Mazumdar	solo
1963	Bhrantibilas	"Tumi Ki Sei Tumi Nao"	Shyamal Mitra	Gauriprasanna Mazumdar	solo
1963	Deya Neya	"E Gaane Projapotir" (part 1)	Shyamal Mitra	Gauriprasanna Mazumdar	solo
1963	Deya Neya	"E Gaane Projapotir" (part 2)	Shyamal Mitra	Gauriprasanna Mazumdar	solo
1963	Uttar Falguni	"Kaun Tarah Se Tum"	Robin Chatterjee	Traditional	solo
1963	Uttar Falguni	"Tum Chatur"	Robin Chatterjee	Traditional	solo
1963	Uttar Falguni	"Zindagi Ki Ek Bhool Thi"	Robin Chatterjee	Traditional	solo
1963	Uttar Falguni	"Tore Naina Lage"	Robin Chatterjee	Traditional	Chhaya Devi
1965	Alor Pipasa	"Minoti Mor Tomar Paaye"	Hemanta Mukherjee		solo
1965	Alor Pipasa	"Aaja Piya"	Hemanta Mukherjee		solo
1966	Notun Jibon	"Ami Tomare Bhalobeshechi"			solo
1966	Notun Jibon	"Tomare Bhalobeshechi"			solo
1966	Uttar Purush	"Moner Dewale Chirodin"	Manabendra Mukhopadhyay	Shyamal Gupta	solo
1967	Antony Firingee	"Tunhu Mamo Monopran Hey"	Anil Bagchi		solo
1967	Antony Firingee	"Ghiri Ghiri Aai"	Anil Bagchi		solo
1967	Antony Firingee	"Ami Je Jalsaghare" (female)	Anil Bagchi		solo
1967	Antony Firingee	"Champa Chameli Golaperi Baage"	Anil Bagchi		Manna Dey
1967	Gar Nasimpur	"Je Golap Kaantar Ghaye"	Shyamal Mitra		solo
1967	Nayika Sangbad	"Aji Chonchol Mon"	Hemanta Mukherjee		solo
1967	Nayika Sangbad	"Ki Mishti Dekho"	Hemanta Mukherjee		solo
1967	Nayika Sangbad	"Keno E Hridoy"	Hemanta Mukherjee		solo
1969	Kamallata	"O Mon Kokhon Shuru"	Robin Chatterjee	Pranab Roy	Shyamal Mitra
1969	Kamallata	"Se Bine Aar Janena"	Robin Chatterjee	Pranab Roy	Shyamal Mitra
1969	Kamallata	"Niyon Mohon Shyam"	Robin Chatterjee	Pranab Roy	
1969	Kamallata	"Kohe Chondidas"	Robin Chatterjee	Traditional	
1969	Kamallata	"Ham Abhagini Tahe Ekakini"	Robin Chatterjee	Chandidas	
1969	Kamallata	"Tomar Gorobe Gorobini"	Robin Chatterjee	Mahajan Padabali	
1969	Pita Putra	"Teer Bedha Pakhi"	Pabitra Chattopadhyay		solo
1969	Pita Putra	"Probhuji Tumi Dao Dordhon"	Pabitra Chattopadhyay		solo
1969	Pita Putra	"Tumi Koto Sundor"	Pabitra Chattopadhyay		solo
1969	Pita Putra	"Raag Je Tomar Mishti"	Pabitra Chattopadhyay		Hemanta Mukherjee
1970	Bhanu Goyenda Jahar Assistant	"Phooler Marshum Chandni"	Shyamal Mitra	Pranab Roy	solo
1970	Bhanu Goyenda Jahar Assistant	"Malatir Kunjabone Bhramarer Gunjarane"	Shyamal Mitra	Pranab Roy	solo
1970	Bhanu Goyenda Jahar Assistant	"Dure Jadi Chale Jaai"	Shyamal Mitra	Pranab Roy	Shyamal Mitra
1970	Nishi Padma	"Ore Sokol Sona Molin Holo"	Nachiketa Ghosh	Gauriprasanna Mazumdar	solo
1971	Shakuntala	"Dekhogo Priya Dekhona"	Kalipada Sen	Saral Guha	solo
1972	Jiban Saikate	"Keno Je Ke Jaane"	Sudhin Dasgupta		solo
1973	Dhire Bohe Meghna	"Koto Je Dhire Bohe Meghna"	Samar Das, Satya Saha	Mohammad Moniruzzaman	Hemanta Mukherjee
1974	Fuleswari	"Hay Hay Hay Hay"	Hemanta Mukherjee	Pulak Banerjee	Aarti Mukherjee
1975	Hongsoraaj	"Namah Mata Saraswati"	Sudhin Dasgupta		Aarti Mukherjee, Tarun Banerjee
1976	Priyo Bandhobi	"Emon Ekti Golpo Bolte Paro"	Nachiketa Ghosh		solo
1976	Rajbongsho	"Mohuate Hoyna Nesha" (female)			solo
1976	Rajbongsho	"Chol Chol Phire Chol"			Arundhati Holme Chowdhury
1976	Sudur Niharika	"Aaj Ei Raat Jolshar Raat"	Manabendra Mukhopadhyay	Shyamal Gupta	solo
1976	Sudur Niharika	"Ahoto Pakhi"	Manabendra Mukhopadhyay	Shyamal Gupta	solo
1977	Ajasra Dhanyabad	"Tumi Je Amari Gaan"	Shyamal Mitra	Gauriprasanna Mazumdar	solo
1977	Praner Thakur Ramkrishna	"Ogo Nororupi Bhogoban"			solo
1977	Praner Thakur Ramkrishna	"Mon Amar Krishno"			solo
1978	Punarmilan	"Ebare Bujhechhi Ami"	Kalipada Sen		solo
1980	Priyatama	"Bhaibon Dujoner Sneho"	Shyamal Mitra		Shyamal Mitra
1980	Putul Ghor	"O Akash"			solo
1980	Sujata	"Jodi Chand Aar Surjo"	Nachiketa Ghosh		Aarti Mukherjee
1980	Sujata	"Bashi Bajbena Keno"	Nachiketa Ghosh		solo
1980	Upalabdhi	"Golaper Ator Achhe"			solo
1981	Kalankini	"Payel Bedhechhi Paaye"	Shyamal Mitra	Gouriprasanna Mazumdar	solo
1981	Kalankini	"Amar E Buke Kanna"	Shyamal Mitra	Gouriprasanna Mazumdar	solo
1982	Sonar Bangla	"Ei Je Bangla"	Neeta Sen	Gauriprasanna Mazumdar	Hemanta Mukherjee
1982	Sonar Bangla	"Ekdin Chhilo Je Bharote"	Neeta Sen	Gauriprasanna Mazumdar	Sudhin Sarkar
1982	Rajbodhu	"Aaju Rong Khelatu"	Abhijeet Banerjee		solo
1984	Abhishek	"Keno Mala Dile"	Nachiketa Ghosh		Shyamal Mitra
1993	Prithibir Shesh Station	"Khachar Pakhira Aaj"	Rabi Bandyopadhyay		solo
2000	Reenmukti	"Shanto Nodita Aaj"	Abhijeet Banerjee		Saikat Mitra
2000	Reenmukti	"Jokhon Brishti Ase"	Abhijeet Banerjee		solo

== Non-film songs ==
Year	Film	Song	Composer	Lyrics	Co-singer
1975	Down Memory Lane : Music of Kamal Dasgupta	"Mon Niye Priyo"	Kamal Dasgupta	Pranab Roy	solo

== Urdu film songs ==
Year	Film	Song	Composer(s)	Lyricist	Co-singer
1960	Humsafar	"Aankhen Chhalke Mera Dil Dhadke"	Mosleh Uddin	Shair Siddiqui	solo
1960	Humsafar	"Sanwariya O Sanwariya Re"	Mosleh Uddin	Shair Siddiqui	solo

== Awards ==
- Padma Shri in 2022 (refused)
- Banga Bibhushan in 2011.
- Bharat Nirman Award – Lifetime Achievement Award in 1999.
- National Film Award for Best Female Playback Singer for the songs "Amader Chuti Chuti" Jay Jayanti and "Ore Sakol Sona Molin Holo" Nishi Padma in 1971.
- BFJA Awards – Best Female Playback Singer for Sandhya Deeper Sikha in 1965
- BFJA Awards – Best Female Playback Singer for Jay Jayanti in 1972
- Bachsas Awards – Best Female Playback Singer for Dhire Bohe Meghna in 1973
- Honorary D.Litt. from Jadavpur University, Kolkata in 2009.
- Lata Mangeshkar Award in 1993, by Govt of Madhya Pradesh

== Death ==
On 27 January, Sandhya Mukherjee was admitted to SSKM Hospital with breathlessness and was later transferred to Apollo Gleneagles Hospital since she was COVID-19 positive. She also had lung infections, hypotension, ischemic heart disease, multi organ dysfunction and a fracture at her left femur. She was showing progressive improvement in her treatment, became COVID-19 negative and underwent a successful femoral surgery on 11 February. In the morning of 15 February, she was transferred to the intensive care unit for sudden severe abdominal pain and hypotension, following which she died at 7.30 pm of the same day following a cardiac arrest. One of the nurses of the hospital reported that she had the cardiac arrest at the time of listening to "Ei shohor theke aro onek dure", a popular Bengali song by Manna Dey, with whom she sang numerous duets. She was cremated at the electric pyre of Keoratola crematorium with full state honours.
