= Robin Chatterjee =

Indian music director and composer (1914–1976)

Robin Chatterjee রবীন চ্যাটার্জি
- Born: 8 January 1918; Calcutta, Bengal Presidency, British India
- Died: 2 April 1976 (aged 62) Calcutta, West Bengal, India
- Genres: Bengali Music; Bollywood Music
- Occupations: Music director, composer
- Years active: 1942-1976

Robin Chatterjee was an Indian music director and sound recordist who scored music for about ninety films. Starting from the 1942 film Parineeta, he has composed music for evergreen soundtracks such as Godhuli, Bipasha, Sagarika, Kamallata, Dwiper Nam Tiya Rang, etc.

== Career ==
In 1955, he composed music for the film Godhuli which contained a song "Piya Piya Piya Ke Dake Amare". In 1957, he composed music for Uttam-Suchitra starrer superhit Sagarika. In that film, Shyamal Mitra sang "Amar Swapne dekha Rajkanya".

In the 1950s and 1960s, Chatterjee frequently composed scores for director Agradoot, including:

- Sabar Uparey (1955). Songs in the film included "Ghum Ghum Chand" sung by Sandhya Mukherjee and "Kataro Aghate Chino Paye Rokto Jhore" sung by Dhananjay Bhattacharya.
- In Pathey Holo Deri (1957), Sandhya Mukherjee sung Chatterjee's "E Shudhu Gaaner Din", "ei chayaghera logone aaj ke dake amar" and "Tumi Na Hoy Rohite Kachhe".
- Lalu Bhulu – All the songs in the film had been sung by classical singer Manabendra Mukhopadhyay, including "ei pranjharona jaglo", "Dukkho Amar Sesh Kore Dao", "Dukher Pothe Namli Jodi", "Akash Mor Alloy Diyecho Bhore", "Jaar Hiya Akasher" and "Surjo Tomar Sonar Toron".
- Bipasha, with Sandhya Mukherjee's song "Klantir Path Bujhira Phuralo", and "Ami Sapne Tomay Dekhechhi".

== Collaborations ==
Chatterjee worked with many Bengali singers, such as Hemanta Mukherjee, Manna Dey, Shyamal Mitra, Aarti Mukherjee, Sandhya Mukherjee, Pratima Banerjee, Lata Mangeshkar, Asha Bhosle, Geeta Dutt, Arundhati Holme Chowdhury, Utpala Sen and Kishore Kumar.
