= Agradoot =

Bengali film director quintet

- Occupation: Film director

Agradoot (lit. 'pioneer, harbinger') was a group of Indian film technicians signing collectively as director, a phenomenon unique to Bengali cinema. The Agradoot core unit, formed in 1946, consisted initially of Bibhuti Laha (cameraman, 1915–1997), Jatin Datta (sound), Sailen Ghosal (lab work), Nitai Bhattacharya (scenarist) and Bimal Ghosh (production). The group was active up to the end of 1980s.

== Selected filmography ==
Year	Film
1947	Swapna-o-Sadhana
1948	Sabyasachi
1948	Samapika
1949	Sankalpa
1951	Babla
1951	Sahajatri
1952	Aandi
1954	Anupama
1954	Agni Pariksha
1955	Shobar Opore
1956	Trijama
1957	Pathey Holo Deri
1959	Lalu Bhulu
1959	Surya Toran
1960	Khokababur Pratyabartan
1960	Kuhak
1961	Agni Sanskar
1962	Bipasha
1962	Nav Diganta
1963	Uttarayan
1965	Antaral
1965	Suryatapa
1965	Tapasi
1967	Nayika Sangbad
1968	Kokhono Megh
1969	Chiradiner
1970	Manjari Opera
1971	Chhadmabeshi
1973	Sonar Khancha
1977	Din Amader
1981	Surya Sakhi
1989	Aparenher Alo
