= List of Indian Bengali films of the 1960s =

A list of films produced by the Tollywood (Bengali language film industry) based in Kolkata in the 1960s.

== 1960 ==
Chupi Chupi Ashe was directed by Premendra Mitra also Devi was released 19 February 1960 and Directed by Satyajit Ray And Many more movies was released in 1960.

Title	Director	Cast	Genre	Notes
Baishey Sravan	Mrinal Sen	Gyanesh Mukherjee, Madhavi Mukherjee, Hemangini Devi		
Chupi Chupi Aashey	Premendra Mitra	Chhabi Biswas, Jahar Ganguly, Tarun Kumar	Mystery	
Devi	Satyajit Ray	Soumitra Chatterjee	Drama	
Ganga	Rajen Tarafdar	Jnanesh Mukhopadhyay, Sandhya Roy	Drama	
Haat Baralei Bandhu	Sukumar Dasgupta	Santi Bhattacharya, Chhabi Biswas, Biren Chatterjee		
Khokababur Pratyabartan	Agradoot	Uttam Kumar, Tulsi Chakraborty, Sumita Sanyal	Social Drama	
Kshudhita Pashan	Tapan Sinha	Soumitra Chatterjee, Chhabi Biswas, Arundhati Devi	Drama	
Kuhak	Agradoot	Uttam Kumar, Sabitri Chatterjee, Tulsi Chakraborty	Drama	
Maya Mriga	Chitta Bose	Master Abhijit, Sunanda Bannerjee, Nandini Bhattacharya		
Meghe Dhaka Tara	Ritwik Ghatak	Supriya Choudhury, Anil Chatterjee, Gita Dey	Historical Drama	
Nader Nimai	Bimal Roy	Asim Kumar, Chhabi Biswas	Mythological Biography	
Raja-Saja	Bikash Roy	Uttam Kumar, Sabitri Chatterjee, Chandrabati Devi		
Saharer Itikatha	Bishu Dasgupta	Uttam Kumar, Mala Sinha, Pahadi Sanyal		
Sakher Chor	Prafulla Chakraborty	Bhanu Bannerjee, Chhabi Biswas, Tarun Kumar Chatterjee		
Shuno Baranari	Ajoy Kar	Uttam Kumar, Supriya Choudhury, Chhabi Biswas		
Uttar Megh	Jiban Ganguly	Supriya Choudhury, Utpal Dutt, Uttam Kumar	Drama	

== 1961 ==
Title	Director	Cast	Genre	Release date
Manik	Bijolibaran Sen	–	–	13 January
Carey Saheber Munshi	Bikash Roy	–	–	20 January
Ray Bahudur	Ardhendu Mukhopadhyay	–	–	3 February
Sadhak Kamalakanta	Apurba Mitra	–	–	10 February
Sathihara	Sukumar Dasgupta	–	–	3 March
Lakshmi Narayan	Nirmal Chowdhury	–	–	17 March
Mr. & Mrs. Chowdhury	Asim Pal	–	–	24 March
Komal Gandhar	Ritwik Ghatak	Abinash Bannerjee, Abhi Bhattacharya, Bijon Bhattacharya, Satindra Bhattacharya, Debabrata Biswas, Madhabi Mukherjee, Anil Chatterjee, Satyabrata Chattopadhyay, Supriya Devi, Gita Dey	–	31 March
Bishakanya	Sree Jayadratha	–	–	31 March
Agnisanskar	Agradoot	–	–	14 April
Swaralipi	Asit Sen	–	–	14 April
Madhyarater Tara	Pinaki Mukhopadhyay	–	–	21 April
Arghya	Debaki Kumar Bose	–	–	5 May
Teen Kanya	Satyajit Ray	Chandana Banerjee, Nripati Chatterjee, Anil Chatterjee, Khagen Pathak, Gopal Roy, Kali Banerjee, Kanika Majumdar, Kumar Roy, Gobinda Chakravarti, Soumitra Chatterjee, Aparna Sen, Sita Mukherjee, Gita Dey, Santosh Dutta, Mihir Chakravarti, Devi Neogy	–	5 May
Swayambara	Asit Sen	–	–	19 May
Megh	Utpal Dutt	–	–	26 May
Jhinder Bandi	Tapan Sinha	Uttam Kumar, Soumitra Chatterjee, Arundhati Devi	–	9 June
Pankatilak	Mangal Chakraborty	–	–	16 June
Dilli Theke Kolkata	Sushil Ghosh	–	–	7 July
Necklace	Dilip Nag	–	–	7 July
Kanchanmulya	Nirmal Mitra	–	–	14 July
Aaj Kaal Parshu	Nirmal Sarbajna	–	–	28 July
Kathin Maya	Sushil Majumdar	–	–	28 July
Dainee	Manoj Bhattacharya	–	–	18 August
Ashay Bandhinu Ghar	Kanak Mukhopadhyay	–	–	25 August
Madhureno	Shanti Bandopadhyay	–	–	1 September
Mithun Lagna	Shib Bhattacharya	–	–	15 September
Punascha	Mrinal Sen	–	–	15 September
Ingit (Without Dialogue)	Taru Mukhopadhyay	–	–	20 October
Saptapadi	Ajoy Kar	Chhabi Biswas, Chhaya Devi, Utpal Dutt, Tarun Kumar, Uttam Kumar, Padmadevi, Suchitra Sen, Jennifer Kapoor (voice over)	–	20 October
Dui Bhai	Sudhir Mukhopadhyay	–	–	27 October
Ahwan	Arabinda Mukhopadhyay	–	–	10 November
Maa	Chitta Bose	–	–	17 November
Sandhyarag	Jiban Gangopadhyay	–	–	17 November
Kanamachhi	Mrinal Sen (Script-Writer)	–	–	8 December
Rabindranath Tagore	Satyajit Ray	Raya Chatterjee, Sovanlal Ganguly, Smaran Ghosal	Documentary	
Sathi Hara	Sukumar Dasgupta	Uttam Kumar, Mala Sinha, Sudhir Basu		

== 1962 ==
Title	Director	Cast	awards
Aamar Desh (Short)	Tapan Sinha	Uttam Kumar, Kali Bandyopadhyay, Anil Chatterjee, Biswajit, Bikash Ray, Radhamohan Bhattacharya, Sandhya Roy, Suchitra Sen	
Abhijan	Satyajit Ray	Soumitra Chatterjee, Waheeda Rehman, Ruma Guha Thakurta, Charuprakash Ghosh, Sekhar Chattopadhyay, Rabi Ghosh, Haradhan Bandyopadhyay	President's Award, India, 1962, Certificate of Merit
Abhisarika	Kamal Majumdar	Supriya Devi, Nirmal Kumar, Asitbaran, Bharati Devi, Bhanu Bandyopadhyay, Jahar Ray, Pahari Sanyal, Snehasish Ghosh, Samar Kumar	
Agnishikha	Rajen Tarafdar	Kanika Majumdar, Basanta Chowdhury, Chhabi Biswas, Pahari Sanyal, Anup Kumar, Kamal Mitra, Jnanesh Mukhopadhyay, Bhanu Bandyopadhyay, Jahar Ray, Chhaya Devi, Gangapada Bose	
Agun	Asit Sen	Sandhya Rani, Soumitra Chatterjee, Anil Chatterjee, Nirmal Kumar, Kanika Majumdar, Sandhya Ray, Pahari Sanyal, Rabi Ghosh, Bhuban Chowdhury, Tulsi Chakraborty, Kalpana Bandyopadhyay	
Atal Jaler Ahwan	Ajoy Kar	Soumitra Chatterjee, Tandra Burman, Chhabi Biswas, Bhanu Bandyopadhyay, Jahar Ray, Aparna Devi, Chhaya Devi	
Badhu	Bhupen Ray	Chhabi Biswas, Kamal Mitra, Bikash Ray, Basanta Chowdhury, Bhanu Bandyopadhyay, Biswajit, Sandhya Ray, Anubha Gupta, Menoka Devi, Sabitri Chatterjee, Pahari Sanyal, Asit Baran, Jahar Ray, Sarajubala, Ajit Bandyopadhyay	
Bandhan	Ardhendu Mukhopadhyay	Anil Chatterjee, Sandhya Roy, Jahar Gangopadhyay, Jiben Bose, Jahar Ray	
Benarasi	Arup Guhathakurta	Soumitra Chatterjee, Ruma Guha Thakurta, Anup Kumar, Tulsi Chakraborty, Mumtaz Ahmed, Tarun Kumar, Sita Mukhopadhyay, Menoka Devi	
Bhagini Nivedita	Bijoy Bose	Arundhati Devi, Amaresh Das, Chhanda Devi, Sunanda Devi, Asitbaran, Silip Ray, Haradhan Bandyopadhyay	President's Award, India, 1961, Gold Medal for Best Film
Bipasha	Agradoot	Uttam Kumar, Suchitra Sen, Chhabi Biswas, Kamal Mitra, Pahari Sanyal, Tulsi Chakraborty	
Dada Thakur	Sudhir Mukhopadhyay	Chhabi Biswas, Sulata Chowdhury, Biswajit, Bhanu Bandyopadhyay, Tarun Kumar, Chhaya Devi, Bidhayak Bhattacharya, Sita Devi, Gangapada Bose, Shyam Laha, Jiben Bose	President's Award, India, 1962, Gold Medal for Best Film
Dakater Hate	Shanti Prasad Chowdhury	Sekhar Chattopadhyay, Rita Sengupta, Anuradha Guha, Ram Gupta, Sailen Gangopadhyay	
Dheuer Pare Dheu	Bhupendra Sanyal & Smiritish Guhathakurta	Shampa Mitra, Shankar, Badal, Gopa, Swapan, Shantanu, Tara Bhaduri, Dhiraj Das, Arati Das, Anil Dutta	
Dhupchaya	Chitta Bose	Chhabi Biswas, Bipin Gupta, Dipti Ray, Anubha Gupta, N. Biswanathan, Pahari Sanyal, Biswajit, Sandhya Roy, Tarun Kumar, Kamal Mitra, Ajit Bandyopadhyay, Aparna Devi, Dhiraj Das	
Hansuli Banker Upakatha	Tapan Sinha	Kali Bandyopadhyay, Dilip Ray, Ranjana Bandyopadhyay, Anubha Gupta, Lily Chakravarty, Nibhanani Debi, Rabi Ghosh, Sukhen Das	
Kajal	Sunil Bandyopadhyay	Chhabi Biswas, Supriya Devi, Asim Kumar, Pahari Sanyal, Jahar Ray, Tulsi Chakraborty, Shyam Laha	
Kanchenjungha	Satyajit Ray	Chhabi Biswas, Karuna Bandyopadhyay, Alakananda Ray, Arun Mukhopadhyay, Bidya Sinha, Pahari Sanyal, Anil Chatterjee	
Kancher Swarga	Yatrik	Dilip Mukhopadhyay, Kajal Gupta, Anil Chatterjee, Manjula Bandyopadhyay, Pahari Sanyal, Chhaya Devi, Bikash Ray, Tarun Kumar, Gita Dey, Utpal Dutt, Chhabi Biswas	President's Award, India, 1962, Silver Medal for Best Bengali Film
Kanna	Agragami	Uttam Kumar, Nandita Bose, Sulata Chowdhury, Ardhendu Mukhopadhyay	
Khana	Baidyanath Bandyopadhyay	Sabitri Chatterjee, Padma Devi, Tapati Ghosh, Aparna Devi, Kamal Mitra	
Kumari Mon	Director - Chitrarath Screenplay – Ritwik Ghatak	Kanika Majumdar, Anil Chatterjee, Sandhya Ray, Ritwik Ghatak, Satindra Bhattacharya, Dilip Mukhopadhyay, Jnanesh Mukhopadhyay, Nirmal Ghosh, Debi Neogi	
Mayar Sansar	Kanak Mukhopadhyay	Sandhya Rani, Biswajit, Sulata Chowdhury, Chhabi Biswas, Asitbaran, Bikash Roy, Dipti Roy, Bhanu Bandyopadhyay, Tarun Kumar, Mala Bag	
Mon Dilona Badhu	Santosh Mukhopadhyay	Sabita Bose, Biren Chattopadhyay, Jahar Ray, Sumana Bhattacharya, Tulsi Chakraborty, Nripati Chattopadhyay, Nabadwip Haldar	
Nabadiganta	Agradoot	Sabitri Chatterjee, Basanta Chowdhury, Biswajit, Sandhya Roy, Pahari Sanyal, Jahar Gangopadhyay, Aparna Devi, Shila Pal, Krishnadhan Mukhopadhyay, Amar Mullik, Gita Dey	
Rakta Palash	Pinaki Mukhopadhyay	Anil Chatterjee, Sandhya Ray, Niranjan Ray, Dipak Mukhopadhyay, Kamal Mitra, Chhaya Devi, Renuka Devi, Jahar Ray, Moni Srimani, Sisir Batabyal, Utpal Dutt	
Sancharini	Sushil Majumdar	Kanika Majumdar, Basanta Chowdhury, Lily Chakravarty, Pahari Sanyal, Bikash Roy, Chhaya Devi	
Shasti	Daya Bhai	Soumitra Chatterjee, Sandhya Roy, Malabika Gupta, Sabitabrata Dutta, Tulsi Chakraborty, Aparna Devi	
Shesh Chinha	Bibhuti Chakraborty	Sandhya Roy, Anil Chatterjee, Lily Chakravarty, Kamal Mitra, Renuka Ray, Anup Kumar, Tulsi Chakraborty	
Shiulibari	Pijush Bose	Uttam Kumar, Arundhati Devi, Chhabi Biswas, Tarun Kumar, Dilip Ray, Sefali Bandyopadhyay	
Shubhodrishti	Chitta Bose	Sandhya Rani, Sandhya Roy, Arun Mukhopadhyay, Chhabi Biswas, Kali Bandyopadhyay, Anup Kuar, Gita Dey, Dipika Das, Chitra Mondal, Tamal Lahiri	
Sorry Madam	Dilip Bose	Biswajit, Sandhya Roy, Chhabi Biswas, Jahar Roy, Aparna Devi, Dilip Ray, Nripati Chattopadhyay, Tulsi Chakraborty, Ajit Chattopadhyay	
Suryasnan	Ajoy Kumar	Tripti Mitra, Aparna Devi, Lily Chakravarty, Sambhu Mitra, Chhabi Biswas, Pahari Sanyal, Tulsi Chakraborty, Anil Chatterjee	
Taranisen Badh	Chitrasarathi	Sandhya Rani, Sunanda Devi, Nitish Mukhopadhyay, Gurudas Bandyopadhyay, Gangapada Bose	

== 1963 ==
Title	Director	Cast	Genre	Notes/Music
Abaseshe	Mrinal Sen	Sabitri Chatterjee, Asitbaran, Anup Kumar		
Badsha (1963 film)	Agradoot	Kali Bandopadhyay, Bikash Roy, Sandhya Rani, Master Shankar	Children's	
Barnali	Ajoy Kar	Sharmila Tagore, Soumitra Chatterjee, Haradhan Banerjee, Kamal Mitra, Pahari Sanyal	Drama	Music: Kalipada Sen, Playback: Ruma Guha Thakurta, Aarti Mukherji
Bhranti Bilas	Manu Sen	Uttam Kumar, Bhanu Bandopadhyay, Sabitri Chatterjee	Comedy	
Chhaya Shurjo	Partha Pratim Choudhury	Bhanu Bannerjee, Nirmal Kumar Chakraborty, Haridas Chatterjee		
Deya Neya	Sunil Bandopadhyay	Uttam Kumar, Tanuja	Drama	
Hashi Sudhu Hashi Noy	Santosh Guha Roy	Bhanu Bandopadhyay, Jahor Roy, Biswajit Chatterjee, Tulsi Chakraborty	Comedy, Drama	
Mahanagar	Satyajit Ray		Drama	Won the Silver Bear for Best Director at the 14th Berlin International Film Festival
Nirjan Saikate	Tapan Sinha			
Nisithe	Agragami	Uttam Kumar, Supriya Choudhury, Radamohan Bhattacharya		
Nyayadanda	Mangal Chakravarty	Radamohan Bhattacharya, Asit Baran, Jahar Ganguly, Rabi Ghosh	Drama	
Palatak	Tarun Majumdar	Anup Kumar, Sandhya Roy, Anubha Gupta		
Saat Pake Bandha		Soumitra Chatterjee, Suchitra Sen, Pahari Sanyal	Romance	
Sesh Anka	Haridas Bhattacharya	Uttam Kumar, Pahari Sanyal, Sharmila Tagore, Utpal Dutt	Thriller	
Surya Sikha		Uttam Kumar, Supriya Chowdhury, Chhabi Biswas	Drama	
Uttar Falguni	Asit Sen	Suchitra Sen, Bikash Roy, Dilip Mukherjee	Drama	Won National Film Award for Best Feature Film in Bengali
Uttarayan	Agradoot	Sabitri Chatterjee, Supriya Choudhury, Asha Devi		

== 1964 ==
Title	Director	Cast	Genre	Notes
Bireswar Vivekananda	Madhu Bose	Amaresh Das, Gurudas Bandyopadhyay	Biography	
Charulata	Satyajit Ray	Madhabi Mukherjee, Soumitra Chatterjee	Drama	Won the Silver Bear for Best Director at the 15th Berlin International Film Festival
Jatugriha	Tapan Sinha	Uttam Kumar, Arundhati Devi, Anil Chatterjee	Social Drama	
Kashtipathar	Arabinda Mukhyopadhyay	Bijoy Bhattacharya, Vasant Choudhury, Rabi Ghosh		
Ke Tumi	Shyam Chakraborty	Anil Chatterjee, Sandhya Roy, Bikash Roy	Drama	
Kinu Gowaler Gali	O.C. Ganguly	Sumitra Devi, Kali Bannerjee, Sharmila Tagore		
Lalpathore	Sushil Majumdar	Uttam Kumar, Supriya Devi, Srabani Basu, Rabi Ghosh		
Marutrisha	Suresh Roy	Sabitri Chatterjee, Sabita Basu, Tapati Ghosh	Drama	
Momer Alo	Salil Dutta	Uttam Kumar, Sabitri Chatterjee, Lolita Chatterjee		
Natun Tirtha	Sudhir Mukherjee	Durgadas Bannerjee, Jiben Bose, Pratima Chakraborty		
Subha O Debatar Gras	Partha Pratim Choudhury	Kali Bannerjee, Rabi Ghosh, Sharmila Tagore		

== 1965 ==
Title	Director	Cast	Genre	Notes
Akash Kusum	Mrinal Sen	Soumitra Chatterjee, Aparna Sen, Subhendu Chatterjee	Parallel	
Alor Pipasa	Tarun Majumdar	Pahadi Sanyal, Basanta Choudhury, Anup Kumar	Drama	
Atithi	Tapan Sinha	Ajitesh Bandopadhyay, Partha Mukherjee	Drama	
Ghoom Bangar Gaan	Utpal Dutt	Jahor Roy, Sova Sen, Anil Chatterjee, Madhabi Mukherjee	Drama	
Kapurush	Satyajit Ray	Soumitra Chatterjee, Madhabi Mukherjee	Drama	
Mahapurush	Satyajit Ray	Charuprakash Ghosh, Rabi Ghosh		
Pratham Prem	Ajoy Biswas	Asitbaran, Lily Chakravarty, Biswajeet Chakraborty		
Pratinidhi	Mrinal Sen	Soumitra Chatterjee, Sabitri Chatterjee	Drama	
Raja Rammohan	Bijoy Bose	Basanta Choudhury, Chhaya Devi, Basabi Nandi	Drama	
Rajkanya	Sunil Bandyopadhyay	Uttam Kumar, Rina Ghosh, Bhanu Bandopadhyay		
Subarnarekha	Ritwik Ghatak	Abhi Bhattacharya, Madhabi Mukherjee	Historical drama	
Surer Aagun	Bolai Sen	Kali Bannerjee, Rabi Ghosh		
Surya Tapa	Agradoot	Sandhya Roy, Chhayadevi, Uttam Kumar		
Thana Thekey Aaschi	Hiren Nag	Uttam Kumar, Dilip Mukherjee, Kamal Mitra		

== 1966 ==
Title	Director	Cast	Genre	Notes
Galpo Holeo Satti	Tapan Sinha	Rabi Ghosh, Bhanu Bandopadhyay, Rudraprasad Sengupta	Comedy	
Griha Sandaney	Chitta Bose	Anjana Bhowmik, Subrata Chatterjee, Tarun Kumar Chatterjee		
Joradighir Chowdhury Paribar	Ajit Lahiri	Soumitra Chatterjee, Madhabi Mukherjee		
Kal Tumi Aleya	Sachin Mukherjee	Uttam Kumar, Supriya Devi, Sabitri Chatterjee	Drama	
Monihar	Salil Sen	Biswajit Chatterjee, Sandhya Roy, Soumitra Chatterjee	Drama	
Natun Jiban	Aurobindo Mukhopadhyay	Gangapada Basu, Anil Chatterjee, Dipika Das		
Nayak	Satyajit Ray	Uttam Kumar, Sharmila Tagore	Drama	Won the Special Jury Award at the 16th Berlin International Film Festival
Paari	Jagganath Chatterjee	Dharmendra, Dilip Kumar	Mythological	
Rajdrohi	Niren Lahiri	Bishwanath Bannerjee, Kunal Mukherjee, Biswanath Roy		
Shankhyabela	Agragami	Uttam Kumar, Madhabi Mukherjee	Drama	
Subhas Chandra	Pijush Basu	Amar Dutta	Biographical	
Sudhu Ekti Bacchar	Uttam Kumar	Uttam Kumar, Supriya Devi, Jahar Ganguly	Drama	
Swapna Niye	Purnendu Pattrea	Madhavi Mukherjee, Arun Mukherjee, Charuprakash Ghosh		
Uttar Purush	Chitrakar	Vasant Choudhury, Rabi Ghosh, Anup Kumar	Drama	

== 1967 ==
Title	Director	Cast	Genre	Notes
Antony Firingee	Sunil Bannerjee	Uttam Kumar, Tanuja	Musical Drama	
Arogya Niketan	Bijoy Bose	Bikash Roy, Subhendu Chatterjee, Ruma Guha Thakurta	Drama	
Ashite Ashiona	Sree Jayadrath	Bhanu Bannerjee, Asit Baran, Rabi Ghosh	Comedy	
Balika Badhu	Tarun Majumdar	Moushumi Chatterjee	Social Drama	
Chhoti Si Mulaqat	Alo Sarkar	Vyjayanthimala, Uttam Kumar, Rajendranath Malhotra		
Chhuti	Arundhati Devi	Ajitesh Bandopadhyay, Mrinal Mukherjee, Nandini Mahiya	Drama	
Chiriyakhana	Satyajit Ray	Uttam Kumar	Crime Thriller	
Grihadaha	Subodh Mitra	Suchitra Sen, Uttam Kumar, Pradeep Kumar		
Hatey Bazarey	Tapan Sinha	Ashok Kumar, Ajitesh Bannerjee	Drama	
Hathat Dekha		Soumitra Chatterjee, Sandhya Roy	Drama	
Jiban Mrityu	Hiren Nag	Uttam Kumar, Supriya Devi, Kamal Mitra	Drama	
Kanchanmala	Safdar Ali Bhulyan	Sujata, Mannan, Tejen Chakraborty		
Miss Priyambada	Rabi Basu, Dushymanta Choudhuri	Bhanu Bandyopadhyay, Lily Chakraborty		
Nayika Sangbad	Agradoot	Uttam Kumar, Anjana Bhowmik	Romance, Comedy	

== 1968 ==
Title	Director	Cast	Genre	Ref
Ajana Sapath	Salil Sen	Soumitra Chatterjee, Madhabi Mukherjee, Pahari Sanyal, Dilip Roy	Drama	
Apanjan	Tapan Sinha	Chhaya Devi, Samit Bhanja	Drama	
Baghini	Bijay Bose	Soumitra Chatterjee, Sandhya Roy, Rabi Ghosh	Drama	
Baluchari	Ajit Ganguly	Sabitri Chatterjee, Anil Chatterjee, Lily Chakravarty, Anup Kumar	Drama	
Chowringhee	Pinaki Bhushan Mukherjee	Uttam Kumar, Anjana Bhowmik, Biswajit, Shubhendu Chattopadhyay	Drama	
Garh Nasimpur	Ajit Lahiri	Biswajit, Uttam Kumar, Madhabi Mukherjee, Tarun Kumar	Periodic film	
Kokhono Megh	Agradoot	Uttam Kumar, Anjana Bhowmik, Kali Bandyopadhyay	Drama, Family, Suspense	
Panchashar	Arup Guhathakurta	Kali Bannerjee, Anil Chatterjee, Ruma Guha Thakurta		
Pathe Holo Dekha	Sachin Adhikari			
Tin Adhyay	Mangal Chakraborty	Uttam Kumar, Supriya Choudhury, Sandhya Roy, Bikash Ray	Drama	

== 1969 ==
Title	Director	Cast	Genre	Notes
Aparichita	Salil Dutta	Uttam Kumar,Soumitra Chatterjee, Aparna Sen, Sandhya Roy		
Balak Gadadhar		Debashree Roy, Chhaya Devi, Gita Dey	Biography	
Chiradiner	Agradoot	Uttam Kumar,Supriya Choudhury, Debjit, Gita Dey		
Goopy Gyne Bagha Byne	Satyajit Ray	Tapen Chatterjee, Rabi Ghosh	Fantasy	
Kamalatta	Harisadan Dasgupta	Suchitra Sen, Uttam Kumar, Anil Bag		
Maa O Meye	Sunil Bandopadhyay	Moushumi Chatterjee, Swarup Dutta, Sandhya Rani, Chhaya Devi	Drama	
Megh o Roudra	Arundhati Devi	Swarup Dutta, Nripati Chattopadhyay	Drama	
Mon Niye	Salil Sen	Tarun Kumar Chatterjee, Supriya Choudhury, Gita Dey		
Parineeta	Ajoy Kar	Soumitra Chatterjee, Moushumi Chatterjee, Samit Bhanja	Historical Drama	
Pita Putra	Arvind Mukherjee	Tanuja, Swarup Dutta, Kamal Mitra, Chhaya Devi	Drama	
Pratham Kadam Phool	Inder Sen	Soumitra Chatterjee, Tanuja	Drama	
Sabarmati	Hiren Nag	Uttam Kumar, Supriya Choudhury, Mrityunjay Bandopadhyay		
Shuksari	Sushil Majumdar	Uttam Kumar, Bhanu Bandopadhyay, Anjana Bhowmik		
Sri Jagganath	Vijay Bhaskar	Chakrapani, Jharana Das, Meenushree		
Teen Bhubaner Pare	Ashutosh Bandyopadhyay	Soumitra Chatterjee, Tanuja, Rabi Ghosh		
