= Chhaya Devi =

Indian actress (1914–2001)

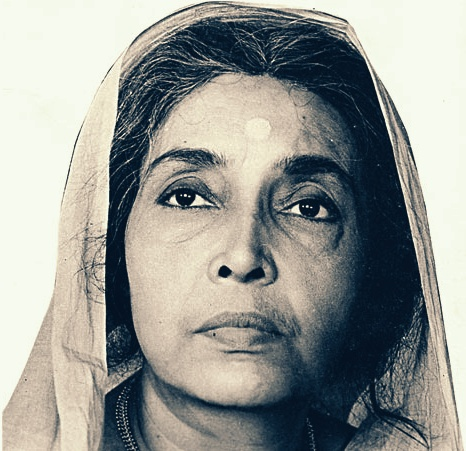
- Born: 3 June 1914; Bhagalpur, Bihar and Orissa, Bengal Presidency, British India (present-day Bihar, India)
- Died: 25 April 2001 (aged 86); Kolkata, West Bengal, India
- Occupation: Actress
- Years active: 1936–1993

Chhaya Devi (Bengali: ছায়া দেবী; 3 June 1914 – 25 April 2001) was an Indian actress known for her work in Bengali and Hindi cinema. She appeared in over 200 films in a career spanning five decades.

Her first lead role was in Debaki Bose's Bengali film Sonar Sansar (1936). She rose to hall of fame for her role as Rani Lakshmi in Debaki Bose's Vidyapati (1937). Some of her notable films are such as Nirjan Saikate (1963), Hatey Bazarey (1967) and Apanjan (1968) by Tapan Sinha, Saptapadi (1961), Uttar Falguni (1963), Antony Firingee (1967), in Bengali, Alaap (1977) in Hindi, which also starred Amitabh Bachchan.

== Early life ==
Chhaya Devi was born in Bhagalpur. Her father was Haradhan Gangopadhyay. She started her education in the Mokshda Girls High School in Adampur, Bhagalpur. Later her father was transferred to Delhi and she continued her education in the Indraprastha Girls School. She was married to Buddhadeb Chattopadhyay, a teacher at Ranchi, at the age of eleven. Her marriage did not last long and she came to Kolkata with her father when she was a student of tenth standard only. She was first cousin of actor Ashok Kumar's wife Shobha Ganguly, thus was related to the Ganguly family as well. However, though very little is known about her early life, her life is believed to be full of struggle. After she reached Kolkata she chose her career as an actress in films and stage, which she pursued for the next five decades.

== Career ==
Though Chhaya Devi debuted in Bengali movie Sonar Sansar in 1936, she acquired fame for the outstanding acting in the role of Queen Lakshmi in the movie Bidyapati in 1938. From lead female roles in her early days to character roles in her later years, Chhaya Devi had shown her creative ability in acting. In Atal Jaler Ahwan (1962), she stole the heart of the viewers with her soft and loving acting as surrogate mother of Soumitra. In Deya Neya (1963) she acted as the helpless mother of the aspirant singer Prashanta (Uttam Kumar). In the movie Saat Pake Badha (1963) she was the heartless, rude and indifferent mother of Suchitra Sen opposing the affair of her daughter with Soumitra. Chhaya Devi played the role of the mother of Uttam Kumar in many films. In Anthony Firingee (1967), Chhaya Devi was mother of Hensman Antony (Uttam Kumar). Apanjan, an outstanding film directed by Tapan Sinha in 1967, which won the National Film Award for Best Feature Film in Bengali, as well as several BFJA Awards, was considered having one of the best of the performances of Chhaya Devi. In Podi Pisir Bormi Bakso (1972), a children's movie made from a story written by Leela Majumdar and directed by Arundhati Devi, Chhaya Devi played an unforgettable lead comic role of Podi Pisi, the widowed elderly aunt. Her last film was Tomar Rakte Amar Sohag, which was released in 1993, in which she acted in a cameo role.

== Filmography ==
=== 1930s ===
- 1936 Sonar Sansar - Roma
- 1936 Rajani - Maid Servant
- 1937 Bidyapati - Queen Laxmi
- 1937 Ranga Bou - Kalyani
- 1938 Bekar Nashan - Kamal
- 1938 Hal Bangla - Sefali
- 1939 Bamanabatar - Sachi
- 1939 Jakher Dhan
- 1939 Debjani - Debjani
- 1939 Janak Nandini - Chandika
- 1939 Rikta - Karuna

=== 1940s ===
- 1940 Abhinetri
- 1940 Haar Jeet
- 1941 Sree Radha
- 1942 Jiban Sangini - Atar
- 1942 Avayer Biye
- 1942 Chauranghee
- 1942 Mera Gaon
- 1945 Bondita
- 1946 Uttara Abhimanyu
- 1947 Burmar Pathey
- 1947 Jharer Par
- 1948 Dhatri Debata
- 1948 Anirban
- 1949 Abhijatya
- 1949 Kuasha

=== 1950s ===
- 1950 Sree Tulsidas
- 1951 Ratnadeep
- 1956 Raat Bhore
- 1956 Shankar Narayan Bank
- 1956 Daner Maryada - Malati
- 1956 Saheb Bibi Golam- Bororani
- 1956 Subhalagna
- 1956 Trijama
- 1958 Bagha Jatin
- 1958 Marmabani
- 1959 Gali Thekey Rajpath

=== 1960s ===
- 1961 Pankatilak
- 1961 Manik
- 1961 Agni Sanskar
- 1962 Kancher Swarga
- 1962 Abasheshe
- 1962 Atal Jaler Ahwan - Anuradha Debi
- 1962 Rakta Palash
- 1963 Kanchan Kanya
- 1963 Deya Neya -the hero's mother
- 1961 Saptapadi - Rina's Mother (Aayah)
- 1963 Nirjan Saikate
- 1963 Saat Pake Bandha - Archana's Mother
- 1963 Uttar Falguni - Baijee
- 1964 Pooja Phalam Telugu
- 1965 Mukhujey Paribar
- 1965 Antaral
- 1965 Arohi
- 1965 Kanch Kata Hirey
- 1965 Surya Tapa
- 1965 Thana Theke Aschi
- 1965 Tu Hi Meri Zindagi
- 1966 Galpo Holeo Satti - Bara Bou
- 1966 Mamta - Minabai
- 1967 Mahashweta
- 1967 Chikkadu Dorakadu Telugu
- 1967 Antony Firingee - Antony's Mother
- 1967 Hatey Bazarey - Nani
- 1968 Teen Adhaya
- 1968 Apanjan- Anandamoyee
- 1968 Baghini
- 1969 Arogya Niketan - Atar Bou
- 1969 Kamallata
- 1969 Pita Putra
- 1969 The Fiancée - Bhubaneswari
- 1969 Protidan

=== 1970s ===
- 1970 Kalankita Nayak
- 1970 Rajkumari
- 1970 Muktisnan
- 1970 Samantaral
- 1971 Kuheli- Mandadi.
- 1971 Rajakota Rahasyam (Telugu)
- 1972 Har Mana Har
- 1972 Sesh Parba
- 1972 Muhammad bin Tughluq (Telugu)
- 1972 Padi Pishir Barmi Baksha - Aunt Padipishi
- 1972 Zindagi Zindagi
- 1974 Debi Chowdhurani - Brajeswar's mother
- 1974 Alor Thikana
- 1975 Swayamsiddha
- 1975 Harano Prapti Niruddesh
- 1975 Phool Sajya
- 1976 Harmonium
- 1976 Sei Chokh
- 1977 Kalpana
- 1977 Proxy
- 1977 Pratima
- 1977 Ae Prithibi Pantha Niwas
- 1977 Baba Taraknath
- 1977 Ek Je Chhilo Desh
- 1977 Babu Moshai
- 1977 Alaap - Sarju Bai Banaraswali
- 1978 Dhanraj Tamang
- 1978 Amara Prema (Telugu)
- 1978 Nadi Theke Sagare
- 1979 Tayaramma Bangaryya (Telugu)
- 1979 Arun barun O Kironmala- The Jogini Maa

=== 1980s ===
- 1981 Kalankini
- 1981 Subarnalata
- 1981 Manikchand
- 1981 Surya Sakhi
- 1982 Rajbadhu
- 1982 Pipasa
- 1983 Shinkhal
- 1983 Rang Birangi - Mrs. Bannerjee
- 1983 Prayashchitta
- 1984 Rashifal
- 1984 Lal Golap
- 1984 Simantarag
- 1987 Swarnamoir Thikana
- 1987 Pratikar
- 1988 Boba Sanai

== Awards ==
- IFFI Best Actor Award (Female) (1965) for "Nirjan Saikate" at 3rd IFFI
