= Kala Mati =

1958 Bengali film

Kala Mati is a Bengali drama film directed by Tapan Sinha based on the novel of Ramapada Chowdhury. This film was released on 6 June 1958 under the banner of Tas Pictures. This is the first Indian film on the life of natives in a coalmine area.

== Plot ==
The film is based on the life of colliers in a coal mine city.

== Cast ==
- Bhanu Bannerjee
- Anil Chatterjee
- Arundhati Devi
- Asit Baran
- Anup Kumar
- Jahor Roy
- Jiben Bose
- Dilip Roy
- Tapati Ghosh
- Namita Sinha
