= Anil Chatterjee =

Indian actor (1929–1993)

- Born: 25 October 1929; Balagarh, Bengal Presidency, British India
- Died: 17 March 1996 (aged 66); Calcutta, West Bengal, India
- Other name: Anil Chattopadhyay
- Occupation: Actor
- Years active: 1952–1996

Anil Chatterjee (also Chattopadhyay, Bengali: অনিল চট্টোপাধ্যায়; 25 October 1929 – 17 March 1996) was an Indian actor in Bengali cinema. His career spanned from the early 1950s through the mid-1990s. He is mostly remembered as a character actor. He appeared in about 150 movies, including a few in Hindi.

== Career ==
Born at Balagarh, in Hooghly, India, he hailed from Calcutta, West Bengal, India, and graduated from St. Xavier's College, Kolkata. Prior to that, he completed his schooling from Delhi, having stood first in entire the North India, in the Senior Cambridge Examinations. In his college days, he became associated with Utpal Dutt and acted in a number of plays. He was also a Member of the West Bengal Legislative Assembly, having won the by-election from the erstwhile Chowringhee Assembly Constituency as a Left Front supported Independent candidate.

Chatterjee played different shades, though mostly as a character actor, as well as in leading roles and at times as an antagonist, despite the limited opportunities he received. Irrespective of the roles, he left an indelible impression on the viewers and the critics. He also acted in the leading role in a tele-serial named Naqab in the national network of Doordarshan. He is one of the very few selected actors who worked with Satyajit Ray, Ritwik Ghatak, Tapan Sinha, Tarun Majumdar and Mrinal Sen; with the first three directors, he performed with on more than a number of occasions. His performance in the title role of the film Deshbandhu Chittaranjan [a biopic on Chittaranjan Das] won the appreciation of Basanti Devi, the wife of the "Deshbandhu".

== Limited filmography ==
Year	Film	Director
1952	Nagarik	Ritwik Ghatak
1953	Jog Biyog	Pinaki Mulhopadhyay
1954	Moyla Kagaj	Premendra Mitra
1954	Grihaprabesh	
1955	Sajghar	
1956	Asabarna	
1957	Garer Math	
1957	Punar Milan	
1957	Ulka	
1958	Ajantrik	Ritwik Ghatak
1958	Daktar Babu	
1958	Kalamati	
1958	Priya	
1958	Rajlakshmi O Srikanta	
1958	Louha Kapat	Tapan Sinha
1959	Chaowa Pawa	Yatrik
1959	Deep Jweley Jai	Asit Sen
1959	Marutirtha Hinglaj	Bikash Roy
1960	Devi	Satyajit Ray
1960	Dui Bechara	
1960	Meghe Dhaka Tara	Ritwik Ghatak
1960	Smriti Tuku Thak	
1961	Agni Sanskar	
1961	Ahwan	
1961	Kanchanmulya	
1961	Komal Gandhar	Ritwik Ghatak
1961	Megh	
1961	Mr. & Mrs. Choudhury	
1961	Teen Kanya - Postmaster	Satyajit Ray
1962	Bandhan	
1962	Kanchenjungha	Satyajit Ray
1962	Kancher Swarga	
1962	Rakta Palash	
1962	Shesh Chinha	
1963	Barnachora	
1963	Dui Bari	
1963	High Heel	
1963	Uttarayan	
1963	Mahanagar	Satyajit Ray
1963	Nirjan Saikate	Tapan Sinha
1964	Ashanata Ghoorni	
1964	Jatugriha	Tapan Sinha
1964	Sandhya Deeper Sikha	
1965	Faraar	
1965	Ghoom Bhangar Gaan	
1965	Jaya	
1966	Natun Jiban	
1966	Sannata	
1966	Mahashweta	
1968	Baluchari	
1968	Boudi	
1968	Jiban Sangeet	
1968	Panchashar	
1969	Protidan	
1970	Muktisnan	
1970	Deshbandhu Chittaranjan	
1970	Sagina Mahato	Tapan Sinha
1970	Samantaral	
1971	Khunjey Berai	
1971	Pratham Basanta	
1973	Bon Palashir Padabali	
1973	Duranta Joy	
1974	Aalor Thikana	
1974	Chhanda Patan	
1974	Phulu Thakurma	
1974	Sagina	Tapan Sinha
1975	Amanush	
1975	Chameli Memsaab	Abdul Majid
1975	Ami, Shey O Shakha	
1975	Phool Sajya	
1976	Ajasra Dhanyabad	
1976	Harmonium	Tapan Sinha
1977	Ek Je Chhilo Desh	Tapan Sinha
1977	Kabita	
1977	Pratima	
1978	Dhanraj Tamang	
1978	Man Abhiman	
1978	Striker	
1978	Tusi	
1979	Dooratwa	
1979	Heerey Manik	
1979	Lattu	
1979	Neem Annapurna	
1981	Upalabdhi	
1982	Troyee	
1982	Chokh	Utpalendu Chakrabarty
1982	Jay Parajay	
1982	Sagar Balaka	
1983	Agradani	Palash Banerjee
1984	Didi	Tapan Sinha
1984	Mohanar Dike	
1984	Paroma	Aparna Sen
1984	Surya Trishna	
1985	Aloy Phera	
1985	Amar Prithibi	
1985	Ankahee	Amol Palekar
1985	Putulghar	
1985	Sonar Sansar	
1986	Ashirwad	
1986	Muktapran	
1987	Mahamilan	
1988	Aaj Ka Robin Hood	Tapan Sinha
1988	Agun	
1988	Boba Sanai	
1988	Etwa	
1988	Paar	
1988	Tumi Koto Sundar	
1989	Aakhri Badla	
1989	Aamar Shapath	
1989	Aghatan Ajo Ghate	
1989	Ek Din Achanak	Mrinal Sen
1989	Jaa Devi Sarva Bhuteshu	
1990	Agni Beena	
1991	Bourani	
1991	Ek Doctor Ki Maut	Tapan Sinha
1991	Kagojer Nouka	
1992	Indrajit	
1992	Rupaban Kanya	
1995	Mejo Bou	
1996	Himghar	

== Awards ==
- BFJA Awards-Best Actor In Supporting Role for Agni Sanskar in 1962.
- BFJA Awards-Best Actor In Supporting Role for Sandhya Deeper Sikha in 1965.
- BFJA Awards-Best Actor In Supporting Role for Sagina Mahato in 1971.
- BFJA Awards-Best Actor In Supporting Role for Raja in 1976.
