= 25th National Film Awards =

Indian ceremony celebrating cinema of 1977

- Awarded for: Best of Indian cinema in 1977
- Awarded by: Directorate of Film Festivals
- Presented by: Neelam Sanjeeva Reddy (President of India)
- Presented on: 27 April 1978
- Site: N. D. M. C. Indoor Stadium, Talkatora Gardens, New Delhi
- Official website: dff.nic.in

Highlights
- Best Feature Film: Ghatashraddha
- Dadasaheb Phalke Award: Nitin Bose
- Most awards: Ghatashraddha (3)

The 25th National Film Awards, presented by Directorate of Film Festivals, the organisation set up by Ministry of Information and Broadcasting, India to felicitate the best of Indian Cinema released in the year 1977. Ceremony took place on 27 April 1978.

== Juries ==
Two different committees were formed for feature films and short films, headed by Ebrahim Alkazi and Ashok Mitra respectively.

- Jury Members: Feature Films
  - Ebrahim Alkazi (Chairperson) • Thakazhi Sivasankara Pillai • Adya Rangacharya • Ka. Naa. Subramanyam • Sundari K. Shridharani
  - Firoze Rangoonwalla • Rita Ray (Kobita Sarkar) • N. S. Ramachandran • K. M. Almadi • K. S. Duggal • Raghuveer Chaudhari
  - Allauddin Khan • Swapan Mullick • A. Viswam • R. D. Mathur • M. K. Raina
- Jury Members: Short Films
  - Ashok Mitra (Chairperson) • M. N. Kapur • Kapila Vatsyayan • R. N. Pande

== Awards ==
Awards were divided into feature films and non-feature films.

=== Lifetime Achievement Award ===
Name of Award	Image	Awardee(s)	Awarded As	Awards
Dadasaheb Phalke Award		Nitin Bose	Cinematographer, Director and Screenwriter	Swarna Kamal, ₹40,000 and a Shawl

=== Feature films ===
Feature films were awarded at All India as well as regional level. For 25th National Film Awards, a Kannada film, Ghatashraddha won the President's Gold Medal for the All India Best Feature Film also winning the maximum number of awards (three). Following were the awards given in each category:

==== All India Award ====
Following were the awards given:

Name of Award	Name of Film	Language	Awardee(s)	Cash prize
Best Feature Film	Ghatashraddha	Kannada	Producer: Sadanand Suvarna	Swarna Kamal and ₹40,000
Best Feature Film	Ghatashraddha	Kannada	Director: Girish Kasaravalli	Rajat Kamal and ₹20,000
Best Feature Film	Citation: For lifting the creative cinema of that region to new levels of artistic excellence, for delicacy of treatment and subtle use of the film medium, for the shifting perspective through which the tragic solution is revealed, for projecting the painful, tremulous transition from innocence to experience, for searing intellectual honesty, for the fusion of all the elements into a form so distinctive as to declare it a masterpiece.			
Best Feature Film with Mass Appeal, Wholesome Entertainment and Aesthetic Value	Swami	Hindi	Producer: Jaya Chakravarthy	Swarna Kamal
Best Feature Film with Mass Appeal, Wholesome Entertainment and Aesthetic Value	Swami	Hindi	Director: Basu Chatterjee	Rajat Kamal
Best Feature Film with Mass Appeal, Wholesome Entertainment and Aesthetic Value	Citation: For a taut script, for restrained, mature and dignified performances (especially by Girish Karnad), for meticulous attention to detail, for maintaining the spirit of the original story and translating it into the film medium with effectiveness and grace, for giving an old theme a contemporary relevance, for providing that it is possible to make a film with popular appeal without surrendering psychological truth or artistic values.			
Best Children's Film	Safed Haathi	Hindi	Producer: R. A. Jalan, Pratap Agarwal	Swarna Kamal and ₹15,000
Best Children's Film	Safed Haathi	Hindi	Director: Tapan Sinha	Rajat Kamal and ₹10,000
Best Children's Film	Citation: For a film with which a quiet realism evokes the fascination and mystery of the jungle; for its mature emphasis on the harmonious relationship between man and nature; for the personal empathy portrayed between a child and creatures of the forest; for a story of lyrical charm and gripping adventure which educates even as it entertains children and grown-ups alike.			
Best Direction	Kanchana Sita	Malayalam	G. Aravindan	Rajat Kamal and ₹20,000
Best Direction	Citation: For its courageous and uncompromising exploration of an ancient epic through a pronouncedly new cinematic language, for making the camera speak more eloquently than the introspective characters of the Ramayana, for projecting the interior landscape of the protagonists against the vast backdrop of nature, for matching profound philosophical ideas with astonishing evocations of the beauties of the physical world.			
Best Screenplay	Bhumika	Hindi	• Satyadev Dubey • Shyam Benegal • Girish Karnad	Rajat Kamal and ₹10,000
Best Screenplay	Citation: For powerfully recreating the biography of an actress, for its rare, psychological insights and understanding of human relationships, for the complex integration of theme, style and dramatic situation into an engrossing whole, which provokes the spectator into a new awareness of the predicament of the working woman in Indian society.			
Best Actor	Kodiyettam	Malayalam	Gopi	Rajat Kamal and ₹10,000
Best Actor	Citation: For an uncanny, truthful and subtle portrayal of a nondescript village character, carrying almost imperceptibly his slow inner transformation through normal tribulations of life into new awakening of consciousness, of feeling and of responsibility, for the artless unfolding of character which is evidence of acting ability of high aesthetic order.			
Best Actress	Bhumika	Hindi	Smita Patil	Rajat Kamal and ₹10,000
Best Actress	Citation: For a brilliantly sustained performance, powerful and impassioned, of a complex unconventional character; for the poignant portrayal of a confused woman, harassed, importuned and exploited by the men in her life, driven into a bitter self-questioning loneliness; for vividly drawing the dual roles of woman and actress, the private life and public visage; with rare sensibility and discrimination and a perpetual sense of the ironic.			
Best Child Artist	Ghatashraddha	Kannada	Ajit Kumar	Rajat Kamal and ₹5,000
Best Child Artist	Citation: For depicting with rare sensitivity, a child's growth into awareness of the coarseness and brutality of the adult world, for his silent struggle to retain his innocence and his natural sense of justice; for his poetic evocation of the child's response to the slowly unfolding mysteries of life, the trivial, the brutal and tragic being inextricable elements of human experience.			
Best Music Direction	Ghatashraddha	Kannada	B. V. Karanth	Rajat Kamal and ₹10,000
Best Music Direction	Citation: For employing the resources of sacred and folk music with unerring skill and sensitivity so as to create an atmosphere of subdued pain and loneliness and to lead the poignant theme to its tragic denouement through the tortured process of its unfolding; for the modulation of effects in terms of sound, covering music in all its variegated range within their span, for heightening the mood in each sequence, almost imperceptibly; for creating art at its concealed best.			
Best Male Playback Singer	Hum Kisise Kum Naheen	Hindi	Mohammed Rafi	Rajat Kamal and ₹10,000
Best Male Playback Singer	Citation: For a golden voice, with resonant timbre and charm, highly cultivated to convey the nuances of melodies based on classical and light classical ragas with as much ease and felicity as tunes set to the lilt of light music; for the sheer brilliance of form and content in his powerful interpretations; for a distinctive personal style.			
Best Female Playback Singer	Pathinaru Vayathinile ("Senthoora Poove")	Tamil	S. Janaki	Rajat Kamal and ₹10,000
Best Female Playback Singer	Citation: For purity of diction and melodic excellence; for emotive suggestiveness and lyrical appeal; for a quality of expression which is intensely moving; for rendering the theme song "Senthoora Poove" with deep feeling, reflecting the romantic dreams of youth, slowly merging into the shadows of tragic destiny.			
Best Cinematography (Black and White)	Kokila	Kannada	Balu Mahendra	Rajat Kamal and ₹5,000
Best Cinematography (Black and White)	Citation: For smooth, crisp and immaculate camera work; for the clear, sensitive and discreet portrayal of beings in the first flush of youth; for seizing with a certain lyrical grace their romantic yearnings, their gay abandon, their zest and effervescence, their charming narcissism; for using the camera creatively to project their languid world of gossamer dreams out of which they are roused by the bitter harshness of reality.			
Best Cinematography (Color)	Shatranj Ke Khilari	Hindi	Soumendu Roy	Rajat Kamal and ₹5,000
Best Cinematography (Color)	Citation: For capturing in meticulous detail the opulent splendor of the court of Wajid Ali Shah; for using colour with discrimination and taste to evoke the distinctive decadent flavor of the period and to provide psychological insights into the characters; for projecting the action through a framework of shifting perspectives, thereby providing a movable feast for the eyes, for establishing by pointed contrast the somber hues and subdued functionalism of the environment of General Outram, emphasising by such means the furtive manoeuvring for power; for using the camera to create a visual tapestry, rich in the clash of conflicting events, ideologies and responsibilities.			
Best Sound Recording	Godhuli	Hindi	S. P. Ramanathan	Rajat Kamal and ₹5,000
Best Sound Recording	Citation: For recording great clarity and precision, creating a beautifully modulated tone poem of the various elements; of human speech, of atmospheric effects, of natural sound and vision which makes one live within the film; for superb technical quality which helps to enhance the meaning and impact of a thought-provoking film.			
Best Editing	Inkaar	Hindi	• Waman Bhonsle • Gurudutt Shirali	Rajat Kamal and ₹5,000
Best Editing	Citation: For thrilling sequences which are evidence of extraordinary editorial virtuosity, establishing pace and tempo, brilliantly orchestrated in relation to the swift, suspenseful action; for cutting and montage of such dexterous facility as to conceal the skill which enables the dramatic power to explode across the screen from time to time with stunning impact.			

==== Regional Award ====
The awards were given to the best films made in the regional languages of India. For feature films in Bengali, English, Hindi, Kashmiri, Meitei and Punjabi, award for Best Feature Film was not given.

Name of Award	Name of Film	Awardee(s)	Awards
Best Feature Film in Assamese	Sandhyarag	Producer and Director: Bhabendra Nath Saikia	Rajat Kamal and ₹10,000
Best Feature Film in Assamese	Citation: For investing a simple, almost uneventful story with tragic poignancies, for presenting the intense loneliness and sense of longing of the individual uprooted from village life by eternal economic pressures and cast back into the stagnation and grinding poverty of rural existence by a society which, having used him up; now discards him; for portraying the characters with subtlety and insight and a quiet wry humor lacerating in its irony - all this through actors facing the camera for the first time.		
Best Feature Film in Hindi	Shatranj Ke Khilari	Producer: Suresh Jindal	Rajat Kamal and ₹10,000
Best Feature Film in Hindi	Shatranj Ke Khilari	Director: Satyajit Ray	Rajat Kamal and ₹5,000
Best Feature Film in Hindi	Citation: For the skilful juxtaposing and interweaving of two parallel destinies, the personal and the political; for the setting these against the decadent splendor of the court of Avadh, recreated with a sense of great pictorial beauty and musical charm; for presenting vividly the clash of two cultures, irreconcilable in their distinctive views of the world; for performances of remarkable depth and range, true to the style and flavor of the period.		
Best Feature Film in Kannada	Tabbaliyu Neenade Magane	Producer: B. M. Venkatesh, Chandulal Jain	Rajat Kamal and ₹10,000
Best Feature Film in Kannada	Tabbaliyu Neenade Magane	Director: Girish Karnad, B. V. Karanth	Rajat Kamal and ₹5,000
Best Feature Film in Kannada	Citation: For exploring the conflict between tradition and change in an Indian and Western cultures, for employing the symbol of the sacred cow as a bridge between two civilisations, for the bucolic charm projected through the film's austere setting and particularly through the behaviour of its elderly characters.		
Best Feature Film in Malayalam	Kodiyettam	Producer: Kulathoor Bhaskaran Nair	Rajat Kamal and ₹10,000
Best Feature Film in Malayalam	Kodiyettam	Director: Adoor Gopalakrishnan	Rajat Kamal and ₹5,000
Best Feature Film in Malayalam	Citation: For capturing with an unerring eye for detail the trivia of village life; for presenting through its calculated pace and rhythm a true slice of a rural culture in Kerala; for revealing through seemingly insignificant vignettes the gradual transformation of a casual village drifter into a person of genuine worth and true dignity.		
Best Feature Film in Marathi	Jait Re Jait	Producer: Usha Mangeshkar	Rajat Kamal and ₹10,000
Best Feature Film in Marathi	Jait Re Jait	Director: Jabbar Patel	Rajat Kamal and ₹5,000
Best Feature Film in Marathi	Citation: For consistently transferring to the film medium a successful fictional work (Thakurwadi by G. N. Dandekar); for high lightening the mutual inconsistencies of love, of the fear of God and of superstition in a simple, innocent community of tribal, for the memorable use of the drum in evoking presence of the God and expressing the inexorable demands of love for a cinematic form which captures the lyricism, the cadence and the lilt of folk culture.		
Best Feature Film in Oriya	Chilika Teerey	Producer: Shyamghan Rai Chaudhari	Rajat Kamal and ₹10,000
Best Feature Film in Oriya	Chilika Teerey	Director: Biplab Rai Chaudhari	Rajat Kamal and ₹5,000
Best Feature Film in Oriya	Citation: For showing how, brutally oppressed by vested socio-economical interests, but now inspired by a new sense of freedom the fisher folk of Chilka lake cast off the shackles of the past and achieve their liberation for presenting with understanding and compassion the conflict between individual needs and the welfare of the community, for portraying with vigor and intensity the role of Chilka lake as a mother of the people, sharing with them their joys and sorrows.		
Best Feature Film in Tamil	Agraharathil Kazhutai	Producer: Charley John	Rajat Kamal and ₹10,000
Best Feature Film in Tamil	Agraharathil Kazhutai	Director: John Abraham	Rajat Kamal and ₹5,000
Best Feature Film in Tamil	Citation: For bold experimentation in a conservative milieu; for poetic intensity on a variety of levels; for creating a parable set against the orthodoxies and superstitions of a Brahmin village community; for its sympathy with the dumb world of animals and the equally dumb world of handicapped human beings; for the memorable impression it leaves on the minds of the viewers through the striking visual use of the verses of Subramanya Bharati, the first Tamil modernist.		
Best Feature Film in Telugu	Oka Oori Katha	Producer: A. Parandhama Reddy	Rajat Kamal and ₹10,000
Best Feature Film in Telugu	Oka Oori Katha	Director: Mrinal Sen	Rajat Kamal and ₹5,000
Best Feature Film in Telugu	Citation: For successfully transforming Premchand's story "Kafan" into a scathing commentary on rural destitution and social injustice; for projecting through powerful performances of its leading characters, the degradation and brutalisation of human beings, for its sincere commitment to the cause of the downtrodden; for its fervent impassioned appeal to the conscience of humanity.		

=== Non-Feature films ===
Following were the awards given:

==== Short films ====
Name of Award	Name of Film	Language	Awardee(s)	Cash prize
Best Information Film	Deshratna Rajendra Prasad	Hindi	Producer: Arvind Kumar Sinha	Rajat Kamal and ₹5,000
Best Information Film	Deshratna Rajendra Prasad	Hindi	Director: M. Prabhat	Rajat Kamal and ₹4,000
Best Information Film	Citation: For an objective account of the national struggle for Independence as reflected in the personal life of India first President. The film is an excellent example of historical documentation, while it portrays with much sensitivity Rajendra Prasad as a human being.			
Best Educational / Instructional Film	Tobacco Habits and Oral Cancer	English	Producer: A. V. Films	Rajat Kamal and ₹5,000
Best Educational / Instructional Film	Tobacco Habits and Oral Cancer	English	Director: Arun Khopkar	Rajat Kamal and ₹4,000
Best Educational / Instructional Film	Citation: For its remarkable precision in describing the cause and effect relationship of tobacco habits and oral cancer. It gives a systematic and telling account of a scientific phenomenon and produces an overwhelming impact.			
Best Promotional Film (Non-Commercial and Commercial)	Parvati	Hindi	Producer and Director: Santi P. Chowdhury	Rajat Kamal
Best Promotional Film (Non-Commercial and Commercial)	Citation: For a sensitive presentation of the generation gap and of the interrelationships of family welfare literacy, self-reliance and modernisation of social attitudes. It is a simple, quiet and compelling story and avoids strident didactic-ism.			
Best Experimental Film	Samadhi	Music only	Producer: Film and Television Institute of India	Rajat Kamal and ₹5,000
Best Experimental Film	Samadhi	Music only	Director: John Sankaramangalam	Rajat Kamal and ₹4,000
Best Experimental Film	Citation: For achieving a mellifluous blending of the spirit and philosophy of Yoga, with a wealth of detail of practical exercises in an atmosphere of calm contemplation, ennobling music and recitations from the sacred texts.			
Best Animation Film	Prakriti Ka Niyam	Hindi	Producer: G. P. Asthana for Films Division	Rajat Kamal and ₹5,000
Best Animation Film	Prakriti Ka Niyam	Hindi	Animator: V. G. Samant	Rajat Kamal and ₹5,000
Best Animation Film	Prakriti Ka Niyam	Hindi	Director: B. R. Shendge	Rajat Kamal and ₹4,000
Best Animation Film	Citation: For successfully projecting the case against early marriage through excellent and emotive art work and animation techniques.			
Best Newsreel Cameraman	Indian News Review No. 1508	English	C. L. Kaul	Rajat Kamal and ₹5,000
Best Newsreel Cameraman	Citation: For the breathtaking sweep of his camerawork portraying the faith and emotions of the pilgrims on the hazardous route to the Amarnath Cave, culminating in the final Darshan.			
Best News Review	Unprecedented Havoc (Indian News Review No. 1520)	English	Films Division	Rajat Kamal and ₹5,000
Best News Review	Citation: For a vivid, visual documentation of the havoc wrought by the cyclonic storm which hit the coastal districts of Andhra Pradesh on 19 November 1977.			

=== Awards not given ===
Following were the awards not given as no film was found to be suitable for the award:

- Second Best Feature Film
- Best Story
- Best Feature Film on National Integration
- Best Film on Family Welfare
- Best Lyrics
- Best Film on Social Documentation
- President's Silver Medal for Best Feature Film in Bengali
- President's Silver Medal for Best Feature Film in English
- President's Silver Medal for Best Feature Film in Hindi
- President's Silver Medal for Best Feature Film in Manipuri
- President's Silver Medal for Best Feature Film in Punjabi
