= Jatugriha =

- Directed by: Tapan Sinha
- Screenplay by: Tapan Sinha
- Based on: Jatu Griha by Subodh Ghosh
- Produced by: Uttam Kumar
- Starring: Uttam Kumar; Arundhati Devi; Anil Chatterjee
- Cinematography: Bimal Mukherjee
- Edited by: Subodh Roy
- Music by: Ashish Khan
- Production company: Uttam Kumar Films Private Ltd
- Distributed by: Chayabani Productions Pvt Ltd
- Release date: 20 March 1964
- Running time: 130 minutes
- Country: India
- Language: Bengali

Jatugriha is a 1964 Indian Bengali-language drama film directed by Tapan Sinha and produced by Uttam Kumar based on the novel of the same name by Subodh Ghosh. The film was produced and released on 20 March 1964 under the banner of Uttam Kumar Films Private Limited. The music was composed by the legendary Ashish Khan. This was the fifth film produced by Uttam Kumar. A 1987 Bollywood film, Ijaazat, directed by Gulzar, follows a similar plot. Jatugriha stars Uttam Kumar, Arundhati Devi, Anil Chatterjee and Bikash Roy.

== Plot ==
Shatadal meets Madhuri after a long time in a railway station and their story is narrated through a series of flashbacks. They actually were a happily married couple. Satadal was a successful engineer who lived with his wife Madhuri. But day-by-day, their relationship runs into emotional stress because Madhuri cannot bear children and Shatadal is fond of children. Finally, the couple decided to break up. When they meet at the station, they realize that their fondness for each other has not died.

== Cast ==
- Uttam Kumar as Shatadal
- Arundhati Devi as Madhuri
- Anil Chatterjee as Supryio
- Bikash Roy
- Kajal Gupta
- Binota Roy

== Soundtrack ==
Only song in the film scoreded by Asish Khan and composed by Rabindranath Tagore

Jatugriha

Soundtrack album by Ashish Khan
- Released: 1964
- Recorded: 1963
- Studio: Uttam Kumar Films Pvt Ltd
- Length: 0:02:10
- Label: Sa Re Ga Ma Pa
- Producer: Uttam Kumar

All lyrics are written by Rabindranath Tagore; all music is composed by Rabindranath Tagore.

Songs
No.	Title	Playback	Length
1.	"Amar Je Sob Dite Hobe"	Bandana Singha	2:10
Total length:			2:10

== Production ==
The story of the film was written by the famous author Subodh Ghosh. Uttam Kumar was impressed by the story and wanted to produce it as a movie and requested Tapan Sinha to direct the project. This was the fifth film produced by Uttam and the third film under his own banner Uttam Kumar Films Private Limited. Uttam wanted to do something unique and Jatugriha perfectly served his purpose. Their pair became a brand in Bengal. They delivered 27 films and almost all the films became box-office success. Uttam Kumar waned a versatile actress to play the main female character of the story and hence Arundhati Devi was cast. Arundhati Devi acted with Uttam Kumar in earlier films like Bicharak 1959, and Jhinder Bandi 1961.

== Release ==
The film was released in India on 20 March 1964 – the same year when Satyajit Ray's Charulata was released. Jatugriha literally with English translates and subtitle as The Burnt Home. The film was distributed by Chayabani Private Limited.

== Reception ==
Jatugriha is regarded as one of the best films made in the golden era and an evergreen classic. The film is remembered for its story direction and performances. The film did not perform well at the box office and was totally different and ahead of its time.

== Award ==
- 1964: National Film Award – Certificate of Merit third best feature film in Bengali – Uttam Kumar

== Remakes ==
The film was remade again in Bollywood in 1987 as Ijaazat directed by the legendary Gulzar starring Rekha and Nasiruddin Shah in lead role.
