= Bikash Roy =

Indian Bengali actor (1916–1987)

- Roy in 1960
- Born: 16 May 1916; Calcutta, Bengal Presidency, British India
- Died: 16 April 1987 (aged 70); Calcutta, India
- Occupation: Actor
- Years active: 1947–1986
- Spouse: Kamala Roy
- Children: 2

Bikash Roy (16 May 1916 – 16 April 1987) was an Indian actor and filmmaker who is known for his work in Bengali cinema. He is considered one of the best character artists of India. He also acted in lead roles in a few movies and is well known for his character roles and for his own style of acting in Bengali films from the late 1940s until the mid-1980s.

== Early life and education ==
He was born in Kolkata, but his ancestral home was Madanpur, Nadia, West Bengal, India. Madanpur in the Nadia district. As a member of a rich and aristocratic family, he grew up in liberal surroundings. He first attended Mitra Institution for his matriculation. Then Roy graduated with a Bachelor's of Arts from the University of Calcutta (Presidency College), and later earned a B.L (now it is called LL.B) from the same university.

== Career ==
=== Acting in films ===
He acted in numerous films, including Ratnadeep, '42, Uttar Falguni, Surya Toran, Neel Akasher Neechey, Marutirtha Hinglaj, Jiban Kahini, Jiban Trishna, and Chhadmabeshi. In the early 1950s, he acted as Kamal, the protagonist in the romantic comedy Chheley Kaar and also as a funny grandfather in the 1980 comedy Ogo Bodhu Shundori, followed by similar roles during the end of his career. But what may be his most famous role was the character of the selfless barrister Manish, who is committed to his beloved, a courtesan (played by Suchitra Sen), in Uttar Falguni. He also did a number of radio plays for Akashvani and shot into fame after being cast in the role of a ruthless, tyrannic military officer in the film '42 that included stars like Abhi Bhattacharya, Manju Dey, and Sombhu Mitra among others as stalwarts. His acting prowess and versatility could be gauged in films like Ratnadeep, where he plays the role of an imposter who reforms himself, as the prodigal hero in Naa, as the strife-torn co-protagonist in Surjamukhi (which he also produced), as the affluent businessman who rose from the rags in Surya Toran, as a protagonist (opposite Uttam Kumar) who aspires to beat his rival but is torn within himself in Jiban Trishna, as a patriot in Masterda Surya Sen, as the patriarch in Kanch Kata Hirey, as a caring brother in Dhuli, as the quiet and intense husband in Smriti Tuku Thak (opposite Suchitra Sen who plays a double role), as the quarrelsome husband in Jatugriha (directed by Tapan Sinha and starring Uttam Kumar, Arundhati Devi, and Binota Roy), in Baghini as a police officer, in negative roles - Bibhas, Agni Sanskar, Jighansa, Adwitiya, Bhola Moira, and Karcher Swarga, as a compassionate and humorous doctor in Arohi, as a psychological patient in Andhar Periye (both directed by Tapan Sinha), as a quack in Ramer Sumati, as the elder brother and head of the family in Bindur Chheley, as the hapless and helpless father in Maya Mriga in the early 1960s, and as the proud and high-handed father in Devdas (starring Soumitra Chatterjee, Sumitra Mukherjee, Uttam Kumar, and Supriya Devi) in the late 1970s and so on.

One of the most prominent and best roles played by him was in Arogya Niketan, playing the role of Jibon Moshay, an old village doctor who believes firmly in the Vedic way of medical practice, however, not being absolutely illogical and apartheid to modern medicine and the treatments associated with it. The film won the National Film Award for Best Feature Film in Bengali as well.

=== Acting in theatrical plays ===
His foray in commercial plays was commendable; most worth mentioning being Nahabat which ran for more than 1,200 nights. He pioneered the holding of stage-plays where the characters read out the play and their respective roles in front of the audience; known as "Shruti Natok" (audio drama). The most famous in this genre being Shesher Kobita and Chirakumar Sabha, based respectively on a novel and a play by Rabindranath Tagore. He also acted in a number of radio-plays on Akashvani/All India Radio (AIR), most notably Suk Sari (with Tripti Mitra) and Dui Bon.

=== Directing films ===
His love for the silver screen drove him to produce and direct a number of films like Marutirtha Hinglaj, Raja Saja (both featuring Uttam Kumar as the leading actor), Basant Bahar, Carey Saheber Munshi – a film based on the life and times of Ramram Basu (1757–1813), and Debotar Graash, based on a poem by Rabindranath Tagore.

== Autobiography ==
He remained active well into the 1980s, gradually moving to cameo roles, owing to his failing health. He has few autobiographical titles to his credit: Mone Pore, Kichhu Chhabi, Kichhu Galpo, Prasanga Abhinoy, and Aami.

== Selected filmography ==
- Abhiyatri
- '42
- Masterda Surya Sen
- Bhuli Nai
- Chheley Kaar
- Ratnadeep
- Jighansa
- Taka Aana Pai
- Kirtigarh
- Naa
- Ratrir Tapasya
- Dhuli
- Shap Mochan
- Sajghar
- Abhoyer Biye
- Bishabriksha
- Jiban Kahini
- Jiban Trishna
- Indranath Srikanta O Annadadidi
- Agni Sanskar
- Marutirtha Hinglaj
- Gali Thekey Rajpath
- Smriti Tuku Thak
- Surya Toran
- Bibhas
- Sesh Anka
- Neel Akasher Neechey
- Maya Mriga
- Raja Saja
- Karcher Swarga
- Rajdrohi
- Jatugriha
- Arogya Niketan
- Chhaya Surya
- Kanch Kata Hirey
- Uttar Falguni
- Shap Mochan
- Baghini
- Sabyasachi
- Hangsa Mithun
- Kalankita Nayak
- Prastar Swakshar
- Chhadmabeshi
- Mon Niye
- Arohi
- Har Mana Har
- Nabarag
- Alo Amar Alo
- Adwitiya
- Bon Palashir Padabali
- Kayahiner Kahini
- Megh Kalo
- Bhola Moira
- Bindur Chhele (1973 film)
- Ramer Sumati
- Dour
- Devdas
- Ogo Bodhu Shundori
- Shatru
- Na
- Amar Prithibi (last released film during his lifetime)

== Awards ==
- BFJA Awards - Best Actor In Supporting Role for Uttar Falguni in 1964.
- BFJA Awards - Best Actor In Supporting Role for Kanch Kata Hirey in 1967.
- BFJA Awards - Best Actor In Supporting Role for Prastar Swakshar in 1968.
