= 7th National Film Awards =

Indian ceremony celebrating cinema of 1959

- Awarded for: Best of Indian cinema in 1959
- Awarded by: Ministry of Information and Broadcasting
- Presented by: Sarvepalli Radhakrishnan (Vice President of India)
- Presented on: 1 May 1960
- Site: Vigyan Bhavan, New Delhi
- Official website: dff.nic.in
- Best Feature Film: Apur Sansar

The 7th National Film Awards, then known as State Awards for Films, presented by Ministry of Information and Broadcasting, India to felicitate the best of Indian Cinema released in the year 1959. Ceremony took place at Vigyan Bhavan, New Delhi on 1 May 1960 and awards were given by then Vice-President of India, Dr. Sarvepalli Radhakrishnan.

== Awards ==
Awards were divided into feature films and non-feature films.

President's Gold Medal for the All India Best Feature Film is now better known as National Film Award for Best Feature Film, whereas President's Gold Medal for the Best Documentary Film is analogous to today's National Film Award for Best Non-Feature Film. For children's films, Prime Minister's Gold Medal is now given as National Film Award for Best Children's Film. At the regional level, President's Silver Medal for Best Feature Film is now given as National Film Award for Best Feature Film in a particular language. Certificate of Merit in all the categories is discontinued over the years.

=== Feature films ===
Feature films were awarded at All India as well as regional level. For the 7th National Film Awards, a Bengali film Apur Sansar won the President's Gold Medal for the All India Best Feature Film. Following were the awards given:

==== All India Award ====
For 7th National Film awards, none of the films were awarded from Documentary and Children's Films category as no film was found to be suitable, instead only Certificate of Merit was given. Following were the awards given in each category:

Award	Film	Language	Awardee(s)	Cash prize
President's Gold Medal for the All India Best Feature Film	Apur Sansar	Bengali	Producer: Satyajit Ray Pvt Ltd.	Gold Medal and ₹20,000
President's Gold Medal for the All India Best Feature Film	Apur Sansar	Bengali	Director: Satyajit Ray	₹5,000
All India Certificate of Merit for Second Best Feature Film	Heera Moti	Hindi	Producer: Pravin Desai	Certificate of Merit and ₹10,000
All India Certificate of Merit for Second Best Feature Film	Heera Moti	Hindi	Director: Krishnan Chopra	₹2,500
All India Certificate of Merit for the Third Best Feature Film	Sujata	Hindi	Producer: Bimal Roy	Certificate of Merit only
All India Certificate of Merit for the Third Best Feature Film	Sujata	Hindi	Director: Bimal Roy	Certificate of Merit only
All India Certificate of Merit for Best Children's Film	Banyan Deer	English	Producer: Films Division	Certificate of Merit only
All India Certificate of Merit for Best Children's Film	Banyan Deer	English	Director: Ahmed Lateef	Certificate of Merit only
All India Certificate of Merit for Best Children's Film	Banyan Deer	English	Director: Shanti Verma	Certificate of Merit only
All India Certificate of Merit for Best Children's Film	Banyan Deer	English	Director: G. G. Saraiya	Certificate of Merit only

==== Regional Award ====
The awards were given to the best films made in the regional languages of India. For 7th National Film Awards, President's Silver Medal for Best Feature Film was not given in Bengali, Kannada and Malayalam language; instead Certificate of Merit was awarded in each particular language.

Award	Film	Awardee(s)	
Award	Film	Producer	Director
Feature Films in Assamese
President's Silver Medal for Best Feature Film	Puberun	K. C. Roy	Prabhat Mukherjee
President's Silver Medal for Best Feature Film	Puberun	Paji Doss	Prabhat Mukherjee
Feature Films in Bengali
Certificate of Merit	Bicharak	Arundhati Mukherjee	Prabhat Mukherjee
Feature Films in Hindi
President's Silver Medal for Best Feature Film	Anari	Lachman B. Lulla	Hrishikesh Mukherjee
Feature Films in Kannada
Certificate of Merit	Jagat jyothi Basaweswara	G. S. S. Murthy	T. V. Singh Thakore
Feature Films in Malayalam
Certificate of Merit	Chathurangam	Capt. (Dr.) G. T. Joshua	J. D. Thottan
Certificate of Merit	Chathurangam	Capt. (Dr.) G. T. Joshua	D. V. Swamy
Feature Films in Tamil
President's Silver Medal for Best Feature Film	Bhaaga Pirivinai	G. N. Velumani	A. Bhimsingh
Certificate of Merit	Veerapandiya Kattabomman	B. R. Panthalu	B. R. Panthulu
Certificate of Merit	Kalyana Parisu	Sarvashri S. Krishnamurthy	C. V. Sridhar
Certificate of Merit	Kalyana Parisu	T. Govindarajan	C. V. Sridhar
Certificate of Merit	Kalyana Parisu	C. V. Sridhar	C. V. Sridhar
Feature Films in Telugu
President's Silver Medal for Best Feature Film	Nammina Bantu	Sambhu Films	Adurthi Subba Rao
Certificate of Merit	Maa Inti Mahalakshmi	Navashakthi Films Pvt Ltd.	Gutha Ramineedu
Certificate of Merit	Jayabheri	Vasireddy Narayana Rao	P. Pullaiah

=== Non-Feature films ===
Non-feature film awards were given for the documentaries made in the country. Following were the awards given:

==== Documentaries ====
Award	Film	Language	Awardee(s)	Cash prize
All India Certificate of Merit for the Best Documentary Film	Kathakali	English	Producer: Films Division	Certificate of Merit and ₹2,000
All India Certificate of Merit for the Best Documentary Film	Kathakali	English	Director: Mohan Wadhwani	₹500
All India Certificate of Merit for the Best Documentary Film	Mayurakshi Dam	Hindi	Producer: Films Division	Certificate of Merit only
All India Certificate of Merit for the Best Documentary Film	Mayurakshi Dam	Hindi	Director: N. K. Issar	Certificate of Merit only

=== Awards not given ===
Following were the awards not given as no film was found to be suitable for the award:

- President's Gold Medal for the Best Documentary Film
- Prime Minister's Gold Medal for the Best Children's Film
- President's Silver Medal for Best Feature Film in Bengali
- President's Silver Medal for Best Feature Film in Kannada
- President's Silver Medal for Best Feature Film in Malayalam
- President's Silver Medal for Best Feature Film in Marathi
