= Aaj Ka Robin Hood =

1988 film by Tapan Sinha

- Directed by: Tapan Sinha
- Written by: Tapan Sinha
- Produced by: Tapan Sinha; Children's Film Society
- Starring: Anil Chatterjee; Utpal Dutt; Nana Patekar; Rabi Ghosh
- Cinematography: Kamal Nayak
- Music by: Tapan Sinha
- Distributed by: Gaurang Films
- Release date: 1 January 1988
- Running time: 111 minutes
- Country: India
- Language: Hindi

Aaj Ka Robin Hood (Translation: Today's Robin Hood) is a 1988 Indian Hindi adventure-drama film directed and produced by Tapan Sinha. It stars Anil Chatterjee, Utpal Dutt, Nana Patekar, Rabi Ghosh and Satish Shah in lead roles. Music for the film was also scored by Tapan Sinha.

The shooting of the film was done in Ranka Palace, Garhwa, Jharkhand. The film won the 1988 Berlin International Film Festival award under UNICEF Jury Commendation.

== Plot ==
Jatin Chatterjee lives in poverty in India during the period of British rule. He participates in the Indian independence movement and is forced to flee from the authorities. While hiding in a tree, he is discovered by Shyam Jadhav, who shelters him from the British authorities, provides him with an education, and later employs him as a tutor for his sons, Ram, Ramdas, and Ramdulaare.

Years later, the three brothers are married and have children, who also become Jatin's students. Among them is Tetra, the son of farm laborer Chedi Tushar. Despite the lack of electricity in Jatin's classroom, Tetra operates a ceiling fan by hand while studying. His abilities in arithmetic and memorization attract the attention of the Jadhav family, and Ram instructs Jatin to admit him as a regular student.

Ram is subsequently asked to contest an election. He receives little assistance from his brothers: Ramdas is frequently forgetful, while Ramdulaare spends much of his time riding his horse and gambling. Jatin's lessons on the legendary outlaw Robin Hood influence his students and have wider consequences for the local community.

== Cast ==
- Utpal Dutt as Ram S. Jadhav
- Nana Patekar as Ramdulaare S. Jadhav
- Rabi Ghosh
- Satish Shah as Ramdas S. Jadhav
- Anil Chatterjee
- Ritesh Talwar as Tetra Chedi Tushar
- Master Ravi as Ramkishan Ram Jadhav

== See also ==
- List of films and television series featuring Robin Hood
