= Anindya Sinha =

Indian scientist

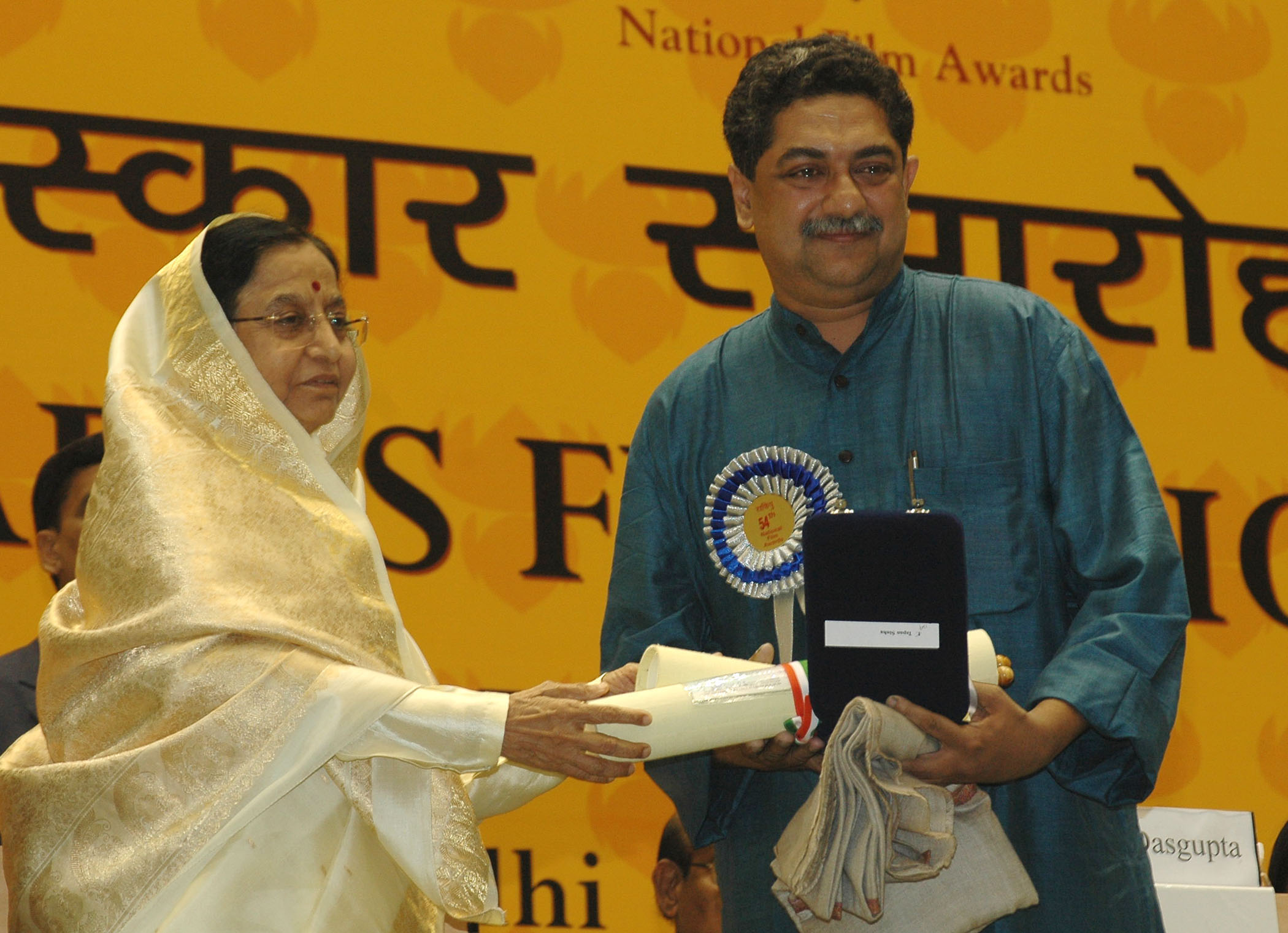
- Anindya Sinha receiving Dadasaheb Phalke Award from Pratibha Patil, on behalf of his father Tapan Sinha, in 2006
- Born: 1954 (age 71–72); Kolkata
- Other name: Rana
- Education: Presidency College, Kolkata; M.S. Botany, University of Calcutta; PhD Molecular Biology, Tata Institute of Fundamental Research
- Occupation: Professor
- Years active: 1996–present
- Employer: National Institute of Advanced Studies
- Known for: Primatology, Behavioral ecology and others
- Notable work: Discovery of Arunachal macaque
- Spouse: Kakoli Mukhopadhyay
- Parents: Tapan Sinha (father); Arundhati Devi (mother)
- Awards: TED Fellow
- Website: nias.res.in/professor/anindya-sinha

Anindya (Rana) Sinha is an Indian primatologist. He is a professor at the National Institute of Advanced Studies (NIAS), India.

== Early life ==
Sinha was born in 1954, to Prabhat Mukherjee and Arundhati Devi. He was nine months old when his parents separated in 1955. He obtained an undergraduate degree in botany from the University of Calcutta in 1983, and a postgraduate degree from the same university in 1985, specializing in cytogenetics.

== Career ==
He is on the executive board of Nature Conservation Foundation, India. His research is mostly centered on the field of cognition and consciousness of bonnet macaque (Macaca radiata) but he has also been involved in genetics projects on Indian primates. He is also involved with Biology Olympiad as the leader of the Indian team.

He is the son of the Indian director and filmmaker Tapan Sinha and filmmaker / actress / singer Arundhati Devi. In 2009, he was chosen as a TED Fellow.
