= 15th National Film Awards =

Indian ceremony celebrating cinema of 1967

- Awarded for: Best of Indian cinema in 1967
- Awarded by: Ministry of Information and Broadcasting
- Presented by: Zakir Husain (President of India)
- Announced on: 31 October 1968
- Presented on: 25 November 1968
- Site: Vigyan Bhavan, New Delhi
- Official website: dff.nic.in

Highlights
- Best Feature Film: Hatey Bazarey
- Most awards: • Chiriyakhana • Hamraaz • Upkar (2)

The 15th National Film Awards, presented by Ministry of Information and Broadcasting, India to felicitate the best of Indian Cinema released in 1967. Ceremony took place at Vigyan Bhavan, New Delhi on 25 November 1968 and awards were given by then President of India, Zakir Husain.

With 15th National Film Awards, format of awards has been changed, which includes introduction of new awards and categorisation. Unlike earlier, films then categorised into feature films and short films. Feature films awards were continued with All India Awards and Regional Awards but couple of more awards were introduced at the all India level to honour artists and technicians.

Major awards introduced for feature films starting with 15th National Film Awards includes awards for Best Actor, Best Actress, Best Direction, Best Cinematography, Best Music Direction, Best Playback Singer of the Year and Best Screenplay.

Starting 15th National Film Awards, Short films had their own share of awards which introduced seven new awards for various types/genre of short films made in the country, including Best Promotional Film, Best Educational / Instructional Film, Best Film on Social Documentation etc.

Certificate of Merit in all the categories is discontinued with 15th National Film Awards, which also led to discontinuation of second and third film/documentary, again in all the categories, except Second Best Feature Film.

== Juries ==
Six different committees were formed based on the film making sectors in India, mainly based in Bombay, Calcutta and Madras along with the award categories. Another committee for all India level was also formed which included some of the members from regional committee. For 15th National Film Awards, central committee was headed by R. K. Nehru.

- Jury Members: Central
  - R. K. Nehru (Chairperson) • Ammu Swaminathan • Adya Rangacharya • Ardhendu Mukerjee • B. V. Singaracharya • Roshan Lal Malhotra • Sunder Lal Nahata • Jainendra Kumar • Ali Sardar Jafri • M. Mujeeb
- Jury Members: Documentary
  - Padmaja Naidu (Chairperson) • Muriel Wasi • J. D. Singh • R. S. Sharma • Len Chatwin
- Jury Members: Short Films
  - Krishna Kriplani (Chairperson) • Tara Ali Baig • Shiv S. Kapur • Ebrahim Alkazi • Usha Bhagat • Fali Bilimoria
- Jury Regional: Bombay
  - V. A. Naik (Chairperson) • Aloo J. Chibber • Anant Kanekar • R. Srinivasan • Ram Joshi • K. J. Khambatta • Bhanu Prasad Pandya • Pannalal Maheshwary • Sadashiv J. Row Kavi • Bany Talwar
- Jury Regional: Calcutta
  - S. N. Ray (Chairperson) • Premendra Mitra • Rita Ray • R. P. Gupta • Jamuna Baruah • Sachidananda Raut Ray • Asim Pal • D. K. Sircar • Durgadas Mitra
- Jury Regional: Madras
  - C. R. Pattabhiraman (Chairperson) • A. N. Krishna Rao • Devaki Gopidas • K. Subramaniam • S. K. Nayar • D. V. S. Raju • T. E. Vasudevan • V. C. Subburaman • B. Ananthaswami • D. N. Rao

== Awards ==
Awards were divided into feature films and non-feature films.

President's Gold Medal for the All India Best Feature Film is now better known as National Film Award for Best Feature Film, whereas President's Gold Medal for the Best Documentary Film is analogous to today's National Film Award for Best Non-Feature Film. For children's films, Prime Minister's Gold Medal is now given as National Film Award for Best Children's Film. At the regional level, President's Silver Medal for Best Feature Film is now given as National Film Award for Best Feature Film in a particular language. Certificate of Merit in all the categories is discontinued over the years.

=== Feature films ===
Feature films were awarded at All India as well as regional level. For 15th National Film Awards, a Bengali film Hatey Bazarey won the President's Gold Medal for the All India Best Feature Film, whereas a Bengali film Chiriyakhana and two Hindi films, Hamraaz and Upkar won the maximum number of awards (two). Following were the awards given in each category:

==== All India Award ====
Following were the awards given:

Award	Film	Language	Awardee(s)	Cash prize
Best Feature Film	Hatey Bazarey	Bengali	Producer: Asim Dutta	Gold Medal, ₹20,000 and a plaque
Best Feature Film	Hatey Bazarey	Bengali	Director: Tapan Sinha	₹5,000 and a plaque
Second Best Feature Film	Upkar	Hindi	Producer: R. N. Goswami	₹5,000 and a plaque
Second Best Feature Film	Upkar	Hindi	Director: Manoj Kumar	Silver Medal
Best Actor	Antony Firingee	Bengali	Uttam Kumar	A figurine
Best Actor	Chiriyakhana	Bengali	Uttam Kumar	A figurine
Best Actress	Raat Aur Din	Hindi	Nargis	A figurine
Best Cinematography (Black and White)	Bambai Raat Ki Bahon Mein	Hindi	Ramachandra	₹5,000 and a plaque
Best Cinematography (Color)	Hamraaz	Hindi	M. N. Malhotra	₹5,000 and a plaque
Best Direction	Chiriyakhana	Bengali	Satyajit Ray	₹5,000 and a plaque
Best Music Direction	Kandan Karunai	Tamil	K. V. Mahadevan	₹5,000 and a plaque
Best Playback Singer of the Year	Upkar (For the song "Mere Desh Ki Dharti")	Hindi	Mahendra Kapoor	A plaque
Best Screenplay	Agniputhri	Malayalam	S. L. Puram Sadanandan	₹10,000

==== Regional Award ====
The awards were given to the best films made in the regional languages of India. For feature films in Assamese, English, Gujarati, Kashmiri and Oriya language, President's Silver Medal for Best Feature Film was not given. The producer and director of the film were awarded with ₹5,000 and a Silver medal, respectively.

Award	Film	Awardee(s)	
Award	Film	Producer	Director
Best Feature Film in Bengali	Arogya Niketan	Aurora Film Corp Pvt Ltd.	Bijoy Bose
Best Feature Film in Hindi	Hamraaz	B. R. Chopra	B. R. Chopra
Best Feature Film in Kannada	Bangarada Hoovu	B. A. Arasa Kumar	B. A. Arasa Kumar
Best Feature Film in Malayalam	Anveshichu Kandethiyilla	Ravi	P. Bhaskaran
Best Feature Film in Marathi	Santh Wahate Krishnamai	Sahakari Chitrapath Sanstha Ltd.	M. G. Pathak
Best Feature Film in Oriya	Arundhati	Dhiren Patnaik	Prafulla Sengupta
Best Feature Film in Punjabi	Sutlej De Kande	P. P. Maheshwary	P. P. Maheshwary
Best Feature Film in Tamil	Aalayam	M/s. Sunbeam, Madras	Thirumalai
Best Feature Film in Tamil	Aalayam	M/s. Sunbeam, Madras	Mahalingam
Best Feature Film in Telugu	Sudigundalu	Chakravarthi Chitra	Adurthi Subba Rao

=== Non-Feature films ===
Following were the awards given:

==== Short films ====
Award	Film	Language	Awardee(s)	Cash prize
Best Information Film (Documentary)	India '67	Music only	Producer: P. Sukhdev	₹5,000
Best Information Film (Documentary)	India '67	Music only	Director: P. Sukhdev	₹5,000
Best Educational / Instructional Film	Akbar	English	Producer: J. S. Bhownagary for Films Division	₹5,000
Best Educational / Instructional Film	Akbar	English	Director: Shanti S. Varma	₹2,000
Best Film on Social Documentation	I am 20	English	Producer: J. S. Bhownagary for Films Division	₹5,000
Best Film on Social Documentation	I am 20	English	Producer: K. L. Khandpur for Films Division	₹5,000
Best Film on Social Documentation	I am 20	English	Director: S. N. S. Sastry	₹2,000
Best Promotional Film (Commercial)	The Brown Diamond	English	Producer: M/s. Krishnaswamy Associates	Silver Medal
Best Promotional Film (Commercial)	The Brown Diamond	English	Director: S. Krishnaswamy	Silver Medal
Best Promotional Film (Non-Commercial)	Sandesh	Hindi	Producer: J. S. Bhownagary for Films Division	Silver Medal
Best Promotional Film (Non-Commercial)	Sandesh	Hindi	Producer: K. L. Khandpur for Films Division	Silver Medal
Best Promotional Film (Non-Commercial)	Sandesh	Hindi	Director: Omprakash Sharma	Silver Medal
Best Experimental Film	Through The Eyes of a Painter	English	Producer: J. S. Bhownagary for Films Division	₹5,000
Best Experimental Film	Through The Eyes of a Painter	English	Creator: M. F. Husain	₹2,000
Best Animation Film	Inquiry	Music only	Producer: C. T. Baptista	₹5,000
Best Animation Film	Inquiry	Music only	Director: C. T. Baptista	₹5,000

=== Awards not given ===
Following were the awards not given as no film was found to be suitable for the award:

- Best Feature Film on National Unity and Emotional Integration
- Prime Minister's Gold Medal for the Best Children's Film
- President's Silver Medal for Best Feature Film in Assamese
- President's Silver Medal for Best Feature Film in English
- President's Silver Medal for Best Feature Film in Oriya
