= Deshbandhu Chittaranjan =

1970 Bengali film

Deshbandhu Chittaranjan is a Bengali biographical drama film directed by Ardhendu Mukhopadhyay and released in 1970 under the banner of Mitra Productions. Anil Chatterjee performed the title role of Deshbandhu Chittaranjan Das, appreciated by Basanti Devi, the wife of the Deshbandhu.

== Plot ==
The plot revolves with the life of nationalist revolutionary and barrister Chittaranjan Das commonly known as Deshbandhu for the people.

== Cast ==
- Haradhan Bannerjee
- Anil Chatterjee as Chittaranjan Das
- Lily Chakravarty
- Jiben Bose
- Satya Bannerjee
- Amarnath Mukherjee
- Samita Biswas
