= Adalat o Ekti Meye =

- আদালত ও একটি মেয়ে
- Directed by: Tapan Sinha
- Written by: Tapan Sinha
- Produced by: Dhiresh Kumar Chakraborty
- Starring: Tanuja; Manoj Mitra
- Cinematography: Bimal Mukherjee
- Edited by: Subodh Roy
- Music by: Tapan Sinha
- Distributed by: D. K. Films
- Release date: 1981
- Running time: 112 minutes
- Country: India
- Language: Bengali

Adalat o Ekti Meye (Bengali: আদালত ও একটি মেয়ে, English: The Law and a Lady) is a 1981 Bengali feature film directed by Tapan Sinha, starring Tanuja in the lead role. For its powerful and sensitive presentation of rape and its effects on the life of a woman, it won the National Film Award for Best Feature Film in Bengali. In later years, it has come to be regarded as a landmark feminist film.

Tanuja considers it to be her best film.

== Synopsis ==
The film is framed as a courtroom trial, and the story is narrated through flashbacks. Urmila (Tanuja), a young schoolteacher, goes on a holiday to the sea resort of Gopalpur. Her vacation turns into a nightmare as she is gang-raped on the beach by four rich young men. This is only the beginning of her ordeal. The film shows the difficulties she faces in her quest for justice. Her friends and colleagues begin to avoid her. Her fiancé can't handle the situation, and their engagement is broken off. Even her father, though supportive of her wish to bring the culprits to book, turns against her. One of the most striking scenes of the film is set in his office. Tired of answering solicitous, yet prurient, questions from his colleagues, he places on his desk a placard that reads "My raped daughter is well". The families of the culprits are rich and influential, and try their best to subvert the legal process. The police officer who investigated the case is placed under suspension. Urmila faces humiliating questions during the trial, as well as unwanted media attention, but eventually gets justice.

== Cast ==
- Tanuja - Urmila
- Manoj MitraThangare Gobinda (police officer)
- Devika Mukherjee
- Patanjali Guhathakurta
- Nirmal Kumar

== Crew ==
- Direction - Tapan Sinha
- Production - Dhiraj Kumar Chakraborty
- Music - Tapan Sinha
- Cinematography - Bimal Mukherjee
- Editing - Subodh Roy

== Reception ==
When the film was made, its theme was a bold one. Although completed in 1981, its theatrical release was delayed. Many databases list it as a 1982 film, though at the National Film Awards in 1982 it was in competition with other 1981 films. Perhaps due to the discomfort of middle-class audiences, the film did not enjoy the commercial success of some of Sinha's other films. However, in later years it has been consistently listed as one of his best works. The film has been hailed as a strong feminist statement that "questions the integrity of the unsympathetic patriarchal judicial system that stigmatises the victim rather than punishing the criminals".

In a recent (2019) assessment of the film, a reviewer hails the film as "one of the beacon feminist movies much ahead of its time". She applauds the film for not opting to have a "male saviour", unlike other films that deal with rape. Urmila fights her battle on her own.

== Preservation ==
Adalat o Ekti Meye has been restored and digitised by the National Film Archive of India.

== Awards ==
- National Film Award for Best Feature Film in Bengali at the 29th National Film Awards. Citation: For its powerful presentation of the problems of rape and its shattering after-effects in the life of a woman.
