= Kumari Mon =

1962 film directed by Chitrarath

Kumari Mon (1962) Bengali film directed by Chitrarath. The screenplay of the film was written by Ritwik Ghatak. The film was produced by Film Age and the music director was Jyotirindra Moitra.

== Cast ==
- Anil Chatterjee
- Sandhya Roy
- Dilip Mukhopadhyay
- Jnanesh Mukhopadhyay

== Awards ==
- Dilip Ranjan Mukherjee – BFJA Awards (1963) for Best Choreography.
