= Shiulibari =

- Directed by: Pijush Bose
- Written by: Subodh Ghosh; Sailen Roy (Dialogues, Lyrics)
- Screenplay by: Tapan Sinha
- Story by: Subodh Ghosh
- Based on: Naglata by Subodh Ghosh
- Produced by: Probodh Majumder
- Starring: Uttam Kumar; Arundhati Devi
- Cinematography: Dinen Gupta
- Edited by: Subodh Roy
- Music by: Arundhati Debi
- Production company: Movietalk Private Limited
- Distributed by: Prabha Pictures
- Release date: 1962
- Running time: 121:04 minutes
- Country: India
- Language: Bengali

Shiulibari is a 1962 Bengali drama film starring Uttam Kumar and Arundhati Devi. The film was released under the banner of Movietalk Private Limited, directed by Pijush Bose and the screenplay was by the legendary Tapan Sinha. The story was written by Subodh Ghosh and music was composed by Arundhati himself. The film was critically acclaimed and became successful at the box office and ran for 25 weeks in the theaters.

== Plot ==
Young Biju is his father's youngest son. Biju goes to meet his elder sister and accidentally meets Niru, a girl and becomes quite acquainted with her. His father dies of a heart attack. While distributing the properties of his father, Biju discovers that his actual parents had already died and that the person whom he thought to be his father was not his parent. Biju is disturbed and leaves town for an uninhabited area. He decides to build a colony over there along with the "sautals" living there. He invites foreign businessmen to buy land there and make the area prosperous with employment and technology. One day while he goes shopping in the city, he discovers that Niru's father has died and she is now widowed and unhappy. He invites her to his colony and she joins him there.

== Cast ==
- Uttam Kumar
- Arundhati Devi
- Chhabi Biswas
- Tarun Kumar
- Dilip Ray
- Moni Srimani
- Mihir Bhattacharya
- Bireshwar Sen
- Chandan Ray
- Shefali Bandyopadhyay
- Ranjana Bandyopadhyay
- Rathin Ghosh

== Soundtrack ==
The music of the film composed by Arundhati Devi and lyrics was written by Sailen Roy.
