= Utpala Sen =

Indian playback singer (1924–2005)

- উৎপলা সেন
- Born: 12 March 1924; Dhaka, Bengal Presidency, British India (now in Bangladesh)
- Died: 13 May 2005 (aged 81); Kolkata, West Bengal, India
- Occupation: Playback singer
- Years active: 1935–2005
- Spouse(s): Benu Sen, After his death married to Satinath Mukherjee
- Family: Ashish Sen (son); Surya Sen (Grandson)

Utpala Sen (12 March 1924 – 13 May 2005) was a prominent Indian Bengali playback singer. She was a very popular playback singer of her time in the 1950s alongside Sandhya Mukherjee, Pratima Banderjee, Alpana Banerjee, etc. She has sung numerous duets with prominent male singers such as Hemanta Mukherjee, Manna Dey and also her husband, Satinath Mukherjee.

== Career ==
Utpala Sen was born on 12 March 1924 in Dhaka, British India (now in Bangladesh) in a Hindu family. She took her initial lessons in music from Hiranbala Devi and then from Ustad Gul Mohammad Khan. She first sang publicly at the age of 11 in Dhaka Radio in 1935. She recorded her first song in 1939. She joined Dhaka Radio in 1940. In 1941, she got immense popularity with the devotional song "Ek Hate Mor Pujar Thala" which was composed by Sudhirlal Chakraborty. The song "Mahishasur Mardinir Shanti Dile Bhari" added her popularity.

During the early 1940s, she moved to Calcutta, British India (now Kolkata, West Bengal, India) and since then became associated with Radio Akashvani. In 1944, she made her debut with the film Meri Bahen. Then she played back in a few Hindi films till 1954. She sang a total of 17 songs in 11 Hindi films. She usually sang Tagore songs in films such as "Amar Mallika Bone" in Bicharak (1959). The song "Prantateri Gaan Amar" in a 1953 film composed by Salil Chowdhury gave her eternity and is considered to be her best work to date. She also sang some Adhunik Geet songs, most of them with Satinath Mukherjee. She sang "Saptaranger Khela" with Shyamal Mitra in 1957.

== Personal life ==
She was married to Benu Sen and after his death, her mother-in-law insisted her to marry co-singer Satinath Mukherjee. Satinath died on 13 December 1992. Utpala was suffering from cancer for five years and finally died on 13 May 2005 leaving behind her only son.
