= Bhagini Nivedita (film) =

1962 film

- DVD cover
- Directed by: Bijoy Basu
- Produced by: Aurora Film Corporation
- Release date: 16 February 1962 (Kolkata)
- Country: India
- Language: Bengali

Bhagini Nivedita is a 1962 Indian Bengali-language biographical film directed by Bijoy Basu. The story was based on the life of Sister Nivedita, the Scot-Irish social worker who came to India. It won the Best Feature Film award at the 9th National Film Awards.

== Cast ==
- Arundhati Devi as Sister Nivedita
- Asit Baran
- Ajit Banerjee
- Shobha Sen
- Dilip Roy
- Mumtaz Ahmed Khan as Mr. Wilson
- Sunanda Banerjee
- Haradhan Bannerjee
- Dwiju Bhawal
- Premangshu Bose
- Amaresh Das
