= Arogya Niketan (film) =

1967 film by Bijoy Bose

Arogya Niketan is a Bengali drama film directed by Bijoy Bose based on the novel of the same name by Tarasankar Bandyopadhyay. This film was released on 10 August 1967 under the banner of Aurora Film Corporation. This movie received the 15th National Film Award for Best Feature Film in Bengali.

== Plot ==
Pradyut Sen, an allopathic doctor with modern ideas, travels to Nabagram village to establish his medical practice. However, an Ayurvedic practitioner named Jibon Moshai is already working there. The movie centers on the ideological and moral conflicts between the two doctors.

== Cast ==
- Bikash Roy as Jiban Moshai
- Subhendu Chatterjee as Pradyut
- Chhaya Devi as Atar Bou (Moshai's wife)
- Ruma Guha Thakurta as Pradyut's mother
- Sandhya Roy
- Bankim Ghosh
- Rabi Ghosh
- Dilip Roy
- Jahar Ganguly
- Sudhanshu Bandyopadhyay
- Rabin Bhattacharya
- Santi Chatterjee
- Dhiraj Das
