= Bicharak =

1959 Indian Bengali psychological drama film

- Directed by: Prabhat Mukherjee
- Written by: Tarasankar Bandyopadhyay
- Screenplay by: Prabhat Mukherjee
- Based on: Bicharak novel by Tarasankar Bandyopadhyay
- Produced by: Arundhati Devi
- Starring: Sisir Bhaduri; Uttam Kumar; Arundhati Devi; Chhabi Biswas
- Cinematography: Ajoy Mitra
- Edited by: Haridas Mahalanbish
- Music by: Rabindranath Tagore, Timir Baran Bhattachariya
- Production company: Prabhat Production
- Distributed by: Shreebishnu Pictures Private Limited
- Release date: 1959
- Running time: 121 minutes
- Country: India
- Language: Bengali

Bicharak (English: The Judge) is a 1959 Bengali-language psychological thriller film directed by Prabhat Mukherjee. Based on a novel of the same name by Tarasankar Bandyopadhyay, the film was produced by Arundhati Devi. It was released under the banner of Prabhat Productions and received National Film Award for Best Feature Film in Bengali in 1960. The film stars Uttam Kumar in the titular role alongside Arundhati Devi in the lead, while Chhabi Biswas, Pahadi Sanyal and Chandrabati Devi play other pivotal roles. The film showed Uttam Kumar in a pivotal performance as a judge and is remembered as among the best films in his career and in Bengali Cinema history. The film also received critical acclamation and commercial success.

== Plot ==
The plot unfolds with a series of flashbacks which reveal a judge's past and hidden secrets. Gyanendra, a judge, lives with his wife Sarama. Being the Judge, with every trial of similar cases he remembers his past, the truth about his questionable actions. Gyanendra always recalls when he was a popular lawyer, married to Sumoti, a suspicious and rude lady. But he had a weak feelings for his professor's daughter Sarama. One day Gyanendra's house was burnt and his first wife Sumoti died. Gyanendra could not make any attempt to save her, perhaps he was unable to bear Sumati further. Thereafter he marries Sarama and becomes a judge, but realizes his crime and the past haunts him much.

== Cast ==
- Sisir Bhaduri as Judge
- Uttam Kumar as Gyanendra
- Chhabi Biswas as Lawyer
- Pahari Sanyal as Professor
- Arundhati Devi as Sarama
- Dipti Roy as Sumati
- Chandrabati Devi
- Bani Hazra
- Atanu Ghosh

== Soundtrack ==
Bicharak

Soundtrack album by Rabindranath Tagore
- Released: 1959
- Recorded: 1958
- Studio: Prabhat Productions Pvt Ltd
- Length: 0:06:44
- Label: Angel Digital Pvt Ltd
- Director: Suvo Guha Thakurta
- Producer: Prabhat Mukherjee, Arundhati Devi

All lyrics are written by Rabindranath Tagore; all music is composed by Rabindranath Tagore, Suvo Guha Thakurta.

Songs
No.	Title	Playback	Length
1.	"Amar Mallika Bone"	Utpala Sen, Mrinal Chakraborty	2:54
2.	"Amar Bichar Tumi Karo"	Hemant Kumar	1:27
Total length:			4:21

== Award ==
- 1960: Certificate of Merit Best Feature Film in Bengali - Bicharak
