= Hatey Bazarey =

- Directed by: Tapan Sinha
- Written by: Tapan Sinha (script); Banaphool (story)
- Produced by: Asim Dutta
- Starring: Ashok Kumar; Vyjayanthimala; Ajitesh Bandopadhyay; Bhanu Bandopadhyay
- Cinematography: Dinen Gupta
- Edited by: Subodh Roy
- Music by: Tapan Sinha
- Distributed by: Priya Films; Neptune Distributors
- Release date: 25 June 1967
- Running time: 133 minutes
- Country: India
- Language: Bengali

Hatey Bazarey or Hate Bazare (Bengali: হাটে বাজারে; English: The Market Place) is a 1967 award-winning art film by noted Bengali director Tapan Sinha. Produced by Asim Dutta, the story revolves around the conflict between good and evil. The film stars Ashok Kumar, Vyjayanthimala (in her first Bengali venture) and Ajitesh Bandopadhyay in the lead with Bhanu Bandopadhyay, Samit Bhanja, Rudraprasad Sengupta and Gita Dey as the ensemble cast of the film. The film was produced by Priya Entertainment Production Limited owned by Asim Dutta.

== Plot ==
Dr. Anaadi Mukherjee (Ashok Kumar) is a civil surgeon in a small tribal-dominated market town in Birbhum. He is a god-like figure, loved and respected by both the poor tribal folks of the area like the beautiful young widow Chhipli (Vyjayanthimala), Jagadamba the vegetable seller, and old women like Komlididi and Nani (Chhaya Devi) and the bigwigs of the area like the District Magistrate and Superintendent of Police Mr. Pandey. Dr. Mukherjee is a workaholic and lives with his young wife Manu, who has a chronic heart ailment. He comes into conflict with Lacchmanlal (Ajitesh Bannerjee), the son of the local feudal lord Chhabilal, a veritable rogue who lusts after Chhipli, who is protected by the good doctor. After the death of his wife Manu, Dr. Mukherjee leaves his official job and utilizes his savings to start a mobile dispensary for the poor. Lacchmanlal gets irritated by his actions and spreads canards about Dr Mukherjee's relationship with Chhipli, who had been appointed as a trainee nurse in the medical team. On the night of a tribal festival, Lacchmanlal tricks Chhipli into a tryst and attempts to rape her. Dr. Mukherjee gets the news and in a fight with Lacchmanlal strangles the villain to death while getting mortally injured. The next morning he dies, but the work of the clinic is carried on by Chhipli and others of the team under the guidance of a young doctor who had earlier been reprimanded by Dr. Mukherjee.

== Cast ==
- Ashok Kumar as Dr. Anaadi Mukherjee
- Vyjayanthimala as Chhipli
- Ajitesh Bandopadhyay as Lacchmanlal
- Rudraprasad Sengupta
- Chhaya Devi as Nani
- Bhanu Bandopadhyay as Ajoblal
- Samit Bhanja
- Gita Dey as Mrs. Pandey in a guest appearance
- Chinmoy Roy
- Samita Biswas
- Partho Mukerjee

== Music ==
- Cheye Thaki Cheye Thaki - Vyjayanthimala and Mrinal Chakraborty
- Aage Aage Nanandi Chale - Mrinal Chakraborty and Aarti Mukherjee
- Ogo Nadi Apan Bege - Hemanta Mukherjee

== Inspiration ==
This film's story was based on a novel written by Banaphool with the same name. The novel won several awards including Rabindra Puraskar Award in 1962.

== Box office ==
The film was one of the most successful Bengali films of the 1960s.

== Awards ==
Ceremony	Award	Category	Nominee	Outcome	Ref.
13th Asia Pacific Film Festival	Asia Pacific Film Festival	Best Film	Tapan Sinha; Asim Dutta	Won	
32nd Annual BFJA Awards	Bengal Film Journalists' Association Awards	Best Indian Film	Tapan Sinha; Asim Dutta	Won	
15th National Film Awards	National Film Awards	Best Feature Film	Tapan Sinha; Asim Dutta	Won	
15th National Film Awards	National Film Awards	Best Actor Award	Ashok Kumar	Nominated	
Presidential Award 1968	Presidential Award	Best Film	Tapan Sinha; Asim Dutta	Won	
1st Phnom Penh Film Festival	Phnom Penh Film Festival	Silver trophy (Cup of honour)	Tapan Sinha; Asim Dutta	Won	
