= Antardhan =

1992 Indian film by Tapan Sinha

Antardhan is a Bengali thriller drama film directed by Tapan Sinha and produced by Naba Kumar Chandra based on a true story of the disappearance of a lady written by Dibyendu Palit. This film was released in 1992 under the banner of Indrapuri Studiio. This is the debut film of Bengali actor Sabyasachi Chakraborty.

== Plot ==
Professor Sushobhan Mukherjee and his wife go to visit his ill health brother. When they return they find their only daughter Ina is missing. Sushobhan files FIR with the police. Investigations reveal that Ina had gone out with one Barun Lahiri who is actually an imposter, involved with a criminal gang. Barun entraps Ina and uses her to entertain their clients. An officer of the investigating team takes a bribe and makes a false report. Sushobhan himself searches for his daughter and goes to Orissa. Finally the police rescue Ina from Barun's den.

== Cast ==
- Soumitra Chatterjee as Sushobhan
- Madhabi Mukherjee as Lina Sushobhan's wife
- Satabdi Roy as Ina
- Sabyasachi Chakraborty as Police Inspector Rohit
- Arjun Chakraborty as Barun
- Manoj Mitra as Advocate
- Nirmal Kumar as Police Inspector
- Bhishma Guhathakurta
