= Jhinder Bondi =

1961 Indian Bengali film

- Poster
- Jhinder Bondi
- Directed by: Tapan Sinha
- Written by: Saradindu Bandyopadhyay
- Screenplay by: Tapan Sinha
- Based on: Jhinder Bondi by Saradindu Bandyopadhyay The Prisoner of Zenda by Anthony Hope
- Produced by: Bhola Nath Roy
- Starring: Uttam Kumar; Arundhati Devi; Soumitra Chatterjee
- Cinematography: Bimal Mukherjee
- Edited by: Subodh Roy
- Music by: Ali Akbar Khan
- Production company: B. N. Productions
- Release date: 9 June 1961 (India)
- Running time: 108 minutes
- Country: India
- Language: Bengali

Jhinder Bondi (Bengali pronunciation: [dʒʱindeɾ bondi] transl. Prisoner of Jhind) is a 1961 Indian Bengali-language epic period action-adventure film co-written and directed by Tapan Sinha. Produced by Bholanath Roy under his banner B. N. Productions, the film was based on Saradindu Bandyopadhyay's novel of the same name, which itself was adapted from the 1894 novel The Prisoner of Zenda by Anthony Hope. It stars Uttam Kumar in triple roles, alongside an ensemble cast of Soumitra Chatterjee, Arundhati Devi, Tarun Kumar, Dilip Roy, Radhamohan Bhattacharya and Sandhya Roy in lead roles. The film plots an ordinary Kolkata resident Gauri Shankar, who is hired to replace his look-alike Shankar Singh, the prince and would-be king of Jhind state as he is abducted on the eve of his coronation ceremony.

The film marks Sinha's second collaboration with both Kumar and Chatterjee and was the first film where the latter two appeared together. It was predominantly shot in Bhopal, with portions shot in Kolkata and Jodhpur. Sinha himself wrote the screenplay and Pijush Basu wrote its dialogues. Music of the film is composed by Ali Akbar Khan, with lyrics penned by Pandit Bhushan and Deep Narayan Mithuria. Cinematography of the film was handled by Bimal Mukherjee, while Subodh Roy edited the film.

Jhinder Bondi theatrically released on 9 June 1961 to positive reviews from critics and audience alike with specific appraisals of its cast performances, cinematography, direction, script, action sequences, and musical score. Running for over 57 weeks, it emerged as the second highest grossing Bengali films of 1961. Jhinder Bondi acquired cult status in Bengali cinema, and became a turning point for Chatterjee in terms of both his acting career, because of his performance as the antagonist in the film.

The plot of Jhinder Bondi was adapted in the 1978 bilingual (Bengali and Hindi) film Bandie starring Uttam Kumar himself.

== Plot ==
A person comes to meet Gauri Shankar Rai, who lives in Kolkata. He introduces himself as a 'fauji Sardar' (Chief of the Armed Forces) of Jhind, a small kingdom in Haryana. He says that the to-be King of Jhind, Shankar Singh, was found missing from the kingdom right before his coronation; this is a conspiracy by his brother Udit Singh, who wants the kingdom for himself. Earlier, too, there were two occasions when a coronation was arranged, but on both occasions, the King was found missing. Udit is a cruel man, unfit to be a good king. Shankar Singh has his vices too, but is a kind-hearted person who would care for his citizens and is thus worthy to be king. Now, coincidentally, Gauri looks exactly like Shankar Singh. This being the last hope, the fauji Sardar requests him to pretend to be the King for the coronation until the real King can be found. Gauri agrees. The two set off for Jhind.

Things aren't easy at the Palace in Jhind. Despite the great luxury of a kingly life, Gauri is constantly threatened by Udit and his friend, the dashingly handsome but evil Mayurvahan. The coronation however takes place successfully; moreover, the pretend King becomes engaged to Rani Kasturi Bai on the occasion. Despite the situation becoming more and more tense, with the life of the King at stake, a romance blooms between Kasturi Bai and Gauri.

A secret agent reveals that the real King is hidden in a fortress owned by Udit, who will murder him as soon as he gets rid of Gauri. The fauji Sardar then reveals to Gauri in secret that Gauri deserves the throne as much as Shankar or Udit because they were all the sons of the then-Dewan of Jhind, Kali Shankar Rai. The then-king being issueless, adopted Shankar and Udit as sons.

After a secret entry to the fortress where the King is being held prisoner, Gauri fights a battle with Mayurvahan, finally killing him as well as surprising and killing Udit. As he approaches his look-alike Shankar Singh, he has a momentary desire to kill the King and gain the kingdom for himself, he being as deserving by blood as Shankar Singh; but his humanity wins over and he approaches the King respectfully, addressing him as "Your Highness". He then bids a last goodbye to Kasturi Bai and mounts a horse to head back to Kolkata.

== Cast ==
- Uttam Kumar in triple role as
  - Gaurishankar Rai, a grim fighter and sportsman from Kolkata
  - Shankar Singh, the would be king of Jhind, a state in Madhya Pradesh
  - Kalishankar Rai, the former Dewan of Jhind in the ancient period and the ancestor of both aforementioned personalities
- Arundhati Devi as Rani Kasturi Bai
- Soumitra Chatterjee as Mayurbahan
- Radhamohan Bhattacharya as Fauji Sardar of Jhind aka Sardar
- Tarun Kumar as Udit Singh, Brother of Shankar Singh and Gauri Shankar
- Dilip Roy as Rudrarup, a loyal companion of the king
- Sandhya Roy as Champa Bai, Rudrarup's love interest
- Dhiren Mukherjee
- Mihir Bhattacharya as Shiv Shankar Roy, Gouri's elder brother

== Soundtrack ==
Jhinder Bandi

Soundtrack album by Ali Akbar Khan
- Released: 1961
- Recorded: 1960
- Studio: B.N Productions
- Length: 0:06:39
- Label: Angel Digital Pvt Ltd
- Producer: Bhola Nath Roy

Ali Akbar Khan chronology
Khudito Pashan (1961)	Jhinder Bandi (1961)

All lyrics are written by Pandit Bhusan, Dipnarayan Mithuria; all music is composed by Ali Akbar Khan.

Songs
No.	Title	Length
1.	"Subh Ghari Subh Din"	1:23
2.	"Jiya More Ghabray"	1:31
3.	"Main Ho Gaye Diwani"	2:51
4.	"Niklage Tore Nayna"	0:54
Total length:		06:39

== Production ==
The film is based on the novel of Saradindu Bandopadhyay of a same name which he itself rewrite of famous English novel Prisoner of Jenda. For the first time two legendary actor of Bengali cinema Uttam and Soumitra worked together. This is the second work with Tapan Sinha for both the actors. The film shooting held in Rajasthan and also shoot in Bengal, Bihar and Lucknow.

Uttam Kumar played duel role for the second time in his career after Tasher Ghar in 1957. Before starting work on the film, director Tapan Sinha told Uttam to learn ride a horse. Then Uttam used to get up at five in the morning and learning the ride his horse in the field. Seeing him during the shooting, Tapan Sinha felt that this hero is not Uttamkumar, he look like a horse-rider. Also need to learn swordplay for the film. Utram also agreed to that. Tapan Sinha then brought in a foreigner called Massey Taylor who is an Olympic champion. Uttam copied Massey's movements exactly the director even Massey himself was shocked on Uttam's talent, skill and dedication.

== Reception ==
The film regarded as one of the greatest Bengali film ever made. Uttam Kumar played one of the most popular duel role and gave one of the finest performance in his career. But in a 2013 review in the Times of India wrote "Here Soumitra was the antagonist and to some extent overshadowed protagonist Uttam Kumar. After ‘Jhinder Bondi’, many even fell in love with an antagonist Mayurbahon more than the protagonist Shankar Singh." The film became superhit at the box office.
