= National Film Award for Best Bengali Feature Film =

Indian film award

- National award for contributions to Indian Cinema
- Awarded for: Best Bengali feature film of the year
- Sponsored by: National Film Development Corporation of India
- Formerly called: President's Silver Medal for Best Feature Film in Bengali (1954–1968); National Film Award for Best Feature Film in Bengali (1969–2021)
- Rewards: Rajat Kamal (Silver Lotus); ₹2,00,000
- First award: 1954
- Most recent winner: Chaalchitra Ekhon (2024)

The National Film Award for Best Bengali Feature Film is one of the National Film Awards presented annually by the National Film Development Corporation of India. It is one of several awards presented for feature films and awarded with Rajat Kamal (Silver Lotus). Since the 70th National Film Awards, the name has been changed to "Best Bengali Feature Film".

The National Film Awards, established in 1954, are the most prominent film awards in India that merit the best of the Indian cinema. The ceremony also presents awards for films in various regional languages.

Awards for films in seven regional language (Bengali, Hindi, Kannada, Malayalam, Marathi, Tamil and Telugu) started from 2nd National Film Awards which were presented on 21 December 1955. Three awards of "President's Silver Medal for Best Feature Film", "Certificate of Merit for the Second Best Feature Film" and "Certificate of Merit for the Third Best Feature Film" were instituted. The later two certificate awards were discontinued from 15th National Film Awards (1967).

Directed by Rupak Adhikary the 1954 film Chheley Kaar was honoured with the first president's silver medal for Best Feature Film in Bengali. Certificate of Merit for Second and Third Best Feature Films in Bengali were received by Jadubhatta and Annapurnar Mandir, respectively. Following is the list of Rajat Kamal recipient films produced in Bengali language.

== Winners ==
Award includes 'Rajat Kamal' (Silver Lotus Award) and cash prize. Following are the award winners over the years:

Awards legends
*	President's Silver Medal for Best Feature Film
*	Certificate of Merit for the Second Best Feature Film
*	Certificate of Merit for the Third Best Feature Film
*	Certificate of Merit for the Best Feature Film
*	Indicates a joint award for that year

List of award films, showing the year (award ceremony), producer(s) and director(s)
Year	Film(s)	Producer(s)	Director(s)	Refs.
1954 (2nd)	Chheley Kaar	Charan Chitra	Chitta Bose	
1954 (2nd)	Jadu Bhatta	Sunrise Film Distributors	Niren Lahiri	
1954 (2nd)	Annapurnar Mandir	Chitra Mandir	Naresh Mitra	
1955 (3rd)	Pather Panchali	Government of West Bengal	Satyajit Ray	
1955 (3rd)	Rani Rashmoni	Chalachitra Pratishthan	Kali Prasad Ghosh	
1955 (3rd)	Rai Kamal	Aurora Film Corporation	Subodh Mitra	
1956 (4th)	Kabuliwala	Charuchitra	Tapan Sinha	
1956 (4th)	Mahakavi Girishchandra	Emkeji Productions	Madhu Bose	
1956 (4th)	Ek Din Ratre	R. K. Films	Sombhu Mitra and Amit Maitra	
1957 (5th)	Andhare Alo	Sreemati Pictures	Haridas Bhattacharya	
1957 (5th)	Louha-Kapat	L. B. Films International	Tapan Sinha	
1957 (5th)	Harano Sur	Alochaya Productions	Ajoy Kar	
1958 (6th)	Sagar Sangamey	De Luxe Film Distributors Ltd.	Debaki Bose	
1958 (6th)	Jalsaghar	Aurora Film Corporation	Satyajit Ray	
1958 (6th)	Daak Harkara	Agragami Productions	Agragami	
1959 (7th)	Bicharak	Arundhati Mukherjee	Prabhat Mukherjee	
1960 (8th)	Devi	Satyajit Ray	Satyajit Ray	
1960 (8th)	Ganga	Cine Art Production Pvt Ltd.	Rajen Tarafdar	
1961 (9th)	Samapti	Satyajit Ray	Satyajit Ray	
1961 (9th)	Saptapadi	Uttam Kumar	Ajoy Kar	
1961 (9th)	Punascha	Mrinal Sen	Mrinal Sen	
1962 (10th)	Kancher Swarga	Prokash Chandra Nan	Yatrik	
1962 (10th)	Nishithe	Agragami Productions	Agragami	
1963 (11th)	Uttar Falguni	Uttam Kumar	Asit Sen	
1963 (11th)	Saat Paake Bandha	R. D. Bansal	Ajoy Kar	
1963 (11th)	Jatu Griha	Uttam Kumar	Tapan Sinha	
1964 (12th)	Aarohi	Asim Pal	Tapan Sinha	
1964 (12th)	Anustup Chhanda	B. K. Productions	Pijush Bose	
1965 (13th)	Akash Kusum	Ranjit Basu	Mrinal Sen	
1965 (13th)	Subarnarekha	Radheshyam	Ritwik Ghatak	
1965 (13th)	Raja Rammohun	Aurora Film Corporation	Bijoy Basu	
1966 (14th)	Nayak	R. D. Banshal and Sharankumari Bansal	Satyajit Ray	
1967 (15th)	Arogya Niketan	Aurora Film Corporation	Bijoy Bose	
1968 (16th)	Apanjan	R. N. Malhotra, R. K. Kapur and T. M. Shah	Tapan Sinha	
1969 (17th)	Natun Pata	Gora Pictures	Dinen Gupta	
1970 (18th)	Malyadan	Ajoy Kar and Bimal Dey	Ajoy Kar	
1971 (19th)	Nimantran		Tarun Majumdar	
1972 (20th)	Strir Patra	Dhrupadi	Purnendu Patri	
1973 (21st)	Ashani Sanket	Sarbeni Bhattacharya	Satyajit Ray	
1974 (22nd)	Sonar Kella	Information and Public Relations Department, Government of West Bengal	Satyajit Ray	
1975 (23rd)	Palanka	Filmarts, Calcutta	Rajen Tarafdar	
1976 (24th)	Ek Je Chillo Desh	–	Tapan Sinha	
1977 (25th)	No Award			
1978 (26th)	Dooratwa	Buddhadeb Dasgupta	Buddhadeb Dasgupta	
1979 (27th)	Ek Din Pratidin	Amalendu Chakraborty	Mrinal Sen	
1980 (28th)	Hirak Rajar Deshe	Information & Cultural Affairs Department and Government of West Bengal	Satyajit Ray	
1981 (29th)	Adalat o Ekti Meye	Dhiresh Kumar Chakraborty	Tapan Sinha	
1982 (30th)	Nagmoti	Sibaprasad Sen	Gautam Chattopadhyay	
1983 (31st)	Vasundhra	Sanjukta Films	Sekhar Chatterjee	
1984 (32nd)	Ghare Baire	NFDC	Satyajit Ray	
1985 (33rd)	Paroma	Nirmal Kumar Guha, Niharendu Guha, Sukhendu Guha, and Sarojendu Guha	Aparna Sen	
1986 (34th)	Phera	Buddhadeb Dasgupta	Buddhadeb Dasgupta	
1987 (35th)	Antarjali Jatra	NFDC	Gautam Ghose	
1988 (36th)	No Award			
1989 (37th)	Ganashatru	NFDC	Satyajit Ray	
1990 (38th)	Atmaja	Raj Kumar Jain	Nabyendu Chatterjee	
1991 (39th)	Antardhan	Nabakumar Chandra, Swapan Kumar Mitra and Sucheta Mitra	Tapan Sinha	
1992 (40th)	Tahader Katha	NFDC	Buddhadeb Dasgupta	
1993 (41st)	Antareen	NFDC and Doordarshan	Mrinal Sen	
1994 (42nd)	Amodini	NFDC and Doordarshan	Chidananda Dasgupta	
1995 (43rd)	Yugant	NFDC	Aparna Sen	
1996 (44th)	Sanghat	Pinaki Chaudhuri	Pinaki Chaudhuri	
1997 (45th)	Dahan	Bijay Agarwal and Kalpana Agarwal	Rituparno Ghosh	
1998 (46th)	Asukh	D. Ramanaidu	Rituparno Ghosh	
1999 (47th)	Paromitar Ek Din	Rajesh Agarwal	Aparna Sen	
2000 (48th)	Dekha	Ramesh Gandhi	Gautam Ghose	
2001 (49th)	Hemanter Pakhi	NFDC	Urmi Chakraborty	
2002 (50th)	Shubho Mahurat	Jagannath Productions	Rituparno Ghosh	
2003 (51st)	Chokher Bali	Shrikant Mohta and Mahendra Soni	Rituparno Ghosh	
2004 (52nd)	Krantikaal	Shampa Bhattacharjee	Shekhar Das	
2005 (53rd)	Herbert	Kajal Bhattacharjee and Abanti Chakraborty	Suman Mukhopadhyay	
2006 (54th)	Anuranan	Jeet Banerjee, Indrani Mukerjee and Aniruddha Roy Chowdhury	Aniruddha Roy Chowdhury	
2006 (54th)	Podokkhep	Nitesh Sharma	Suman Ghosh	
2007 (55th)	Ballygunge Court	Ganesh Kumar Bagaria	Pinaki Chaudhuri	
2008 (56th)	Shob Charitro Kalponik	Reliance Entertainment	Rituparno Ghosh	
2009 (57th)	Abohomaan	Reliance Entertainment	Rituparno Ghosh	
2010 (58th)	Ami Aadu	New Theatres Pvt. Ltd	Somnath Gupta	
2011 (59th)	Ranjana Ami Ar Ashbona	Rana Sarkar	Anjan Dutt	
2012 (60th)	Shabdo	Brand Value Communications Ltd.	Kaushik Ganguly	
2013 (61st)	Bakita Byaktigato	Tripod Entertainment Pvt Ltd.	Pradipta Bhattacharyya	
2014 (62nd)	Nirbashito	Kaushik Ganguly Productions	Churni Ganguly	
2015 (63rd)	Shankhachil	Nideas Creations & Productions	Goutam Ghose	
2016 (64th)	Bishorjan	Opera	Kaushik Ganguly	
2017 (65th)	Mayurakshi	Firdausul Hasan and Prabal Halder	Atanu Ghosh	
2018 (66th)	Ek Je Chhilo Raja	Shree Venkatesh Films	Srijit Mukherji	
2019 (67th)	Gumnaami	Shree Venkatesh Films	Srijit Mukherji	
2020 (68th)	Avijatrik	GMB Films Pvt.Ltd	Subhrajit Mitra	
2021 (69th)	Kalkokkho	Aurora Film Corporation	Sarmistha Maiti and Rajdeep Paul	
2022 (70th)	Kaberi Antardhan	Surinder Films	Kaushik Ganguly	
2023 (71st)	Deep Fridge	Colors of Dream Entertainment	Arjunn Dutta	
2024 (72nd)	Chaalchitra Ekhon	Anjan Dutt Production	Anjan Dutt	
