= Mahashweta =

Novel by Sudha Murthy

- Author: Sudha Murthy

Mahashweta is a Kannada novel by Indian author Sudha Murthy which concerns a female protagonist named "Anupama". The novel deals with people's perception and reactions to leukoderma.

A Marathi novel by Sumati Kshetramade deals with the same topic (leukoderma), and concerns a female protagonist named "Anupama". In 1998–99, a series based on this story was telecasted on Doordarshan of the same name. Aishwarya Narkar (Radha), Avinash Narkar (Madhav) and Ashalata (Kaku) played the lead roles.Murthy says she learned of the Marathi novel only after finishing writing her Kannada novel.

== Plot ==
The name Mahashweta is derived from a Sanskrit play. Anupama is a college girl from a poor family and has a spectacular talent in theatricals. She is beautiful and intelligent and aspires to be a lecturer. She marries Anand, a doctor from an upper family. The marriage was proposed by Anand and agreed by both the families. However, the in-laws are immoral and cruel to her. Anand is indifferent to his family's treatment of Anupama. While he is abroad for his studies, Anupama discovers she has leukoderma. Soon, her in-laws expel her from the house, and she is forced to seek refuge in her own home, but her step mother and half sisters taunt her. Anand does not reply to her letters, and Anupama's father becomes helpless. Anupama receives help from her friend, Sumitra, and departs to Bombay. She takes up a clerical job, and later becomes a lecturer in college. Meanwhile, she leaves Sumitra's house because of Hari (Sumitra's husband), who tried to molest her. A friend from her previous job rents her house to Anupama. Gradually, Anupama becomes free from the people of her past. She befriends Dr, Vasant, who treated her after an accident and Dr. Satya. Years after Anand obtains information about Anupama and meets her. He offers to rejoin together, but Anupama rejects.

== Characters ==
- Anupama - main character
- Dr. Anand - Anupama's husband
- Sumithra - Anupama's friend
- Radhakka - Anupama's mother-in-law
- Girija - Anupama's sister-in-law
- Shamanna - Anupama's father
- Dr. Vasanth - Anupama's friend
- Dr. Satya - Dr. Vasant's colleague (also Anupama's friend)
- Dolly - Anupama's friend and colleague
- Sabakka - Anupama's stepmother
- Nanda - Anupama's stepsister
- Hari - Sumithra's husband
