= Dilip Roy (actor) =

Indian Bengali film actor and director

- দিলীপ রায়
- Born: Dilip Ray; 17 December 1931; Chittagong, Bengal Presidency, British India
- Died: 2 September 2010 (aged 78); Kolkata, India
- Occupations: Actor director
- Known for: Autograph (2010); Aasmaan Mahal (1965); Kagojer Nouka (1991)

Dilip Roy (Bengali: দিলীপ রায়) (17 December 1931 – 2 September 2010) was an Indian Bengali film actor and director. He worked in Bengali films. Roy was born in Chittagong, Bangladesh.

== Death ==
Roy died on 2 September 2010 at Kolkata, India at the age of 79 due to cancer.

== Filmography ==
=== Actor ===
- Autograph (2010)
- Mon Mane Na (2008)
- Ek Mutho Chabi (2005)
- Shubhodristi (2005)
- Moner Manush (1997)
- Himghar (1996)
- Sangharsha (1995)
- Phiriye Dao (1994)
- Nati Binodini (1994)
- Abbajan (1994)
- Rakter Saad (1993)
- Tomar Rakte Amar Sohag (1993)
- Maya Mamata (1993)
- Shet Patharer Thala (1992)
- Indrajit (1992)
- Abhagini (1991)
- Kagojer Nouka (1991)
- Nabab (1991)
- Debata (1990)
- Garmil (1990)
- Hirak Jayanti (1990)
- Toofan (1989)
- Ora Charjan (1988)
- Debika (1987)
- Tin purush (1986)
- Mohanar Dike (1984)
- Surya Trishna (1984)
- Abhinay Noy (1983)
- Ashleelotar Daye (1983)
- Dui Purush (1978)
- Ranger Saheb (1978)
- Dhanraj Tamang (1978)
- Sei Chokh (1976)
- Agnishwar (1975)
- Rodanbhara Basanta (1974)
- Ami Sirajer Begam (1973)
- Aparichita (1969 film) (1969)
- Apanjan (1968)
- Gar Nasimpur (1968)
- Prastar Swakshar (1967)
- Ajana Sapath (1967)
- Joradighir Chowdhury Paribar (1966)
- Rajdrohi (1966)
- Aasmaan Mahal (1965)
- Abhaya O Srikanta (1965)
- Aarohi (1964)
- Sorry Madam (1962)
- Bhagini Nivedita (1962)
- Kathin Maya (1961)
- Jhinder Bandi (1961)
- Kshudhita Pashan (1960)
- Parivar (1956)
- Kshaniker Atithi (1959)
- Louhakapat (1958)

=== Director ===
- Garmil (1990)
- Neelkantha (1985)
- Amrita Kumbher Sandhane (1982)
- Debdas (1979)
