= Arundhati Devi =

Indian actress, director and writer

- Born: 29 April 1924; Barisal, Bengal Presidency, British India (now in Bangladesh)
- Died: 16 October 1990 (aged 66); Calcutta, West Bengal, India
- Occupations: Actress; director; writer; singer
- Years active: 1940 – 1982
- Notable work: Bicharak; Jatugriha
- Spouses: Prabhat Mukherjee (m. 1940; div. 1955); Tapan Sinha (m. 1957)
- Children: 2, including Anindya Sinha

Arundhati Devi (née Guha Thakurata; also known as Arundhati Mukherjee or Mukhopadhyay; 29 April 1924 – 16 October 1990) was an Indian actress, director, writer and singer who is predominantly known for her work in Bengali cinema.

Arundhati Devi was a student of Visva-Bharati University where she was trained in Rabindra Sangeet by Sailajaranjan Majumdar. She began her career as a Rabindra Sangeet singer at All India Radio in 1940. As an actress, Arundhati Devi made her film debut in Kartik Chattopadhyay's Bengali film Mahaprasthaner Pathe (1952) which also had a Hindi version titled Yatrik. She later collaborated with directors such as Devaki Kumar Bose in Nabajanma (1956), Asit Sen in Chalachal (1956) and Panchatapa (1957), Prabhat Mukhopadhyay in Maa (1956), Mamata (1957), Bicharak (1959) and Akashpatal (1960), and Tapan Sinha in Kalamati (1958), Jhinder Bondi (1961), and Jatugriha (1964). In 1963, she was conferred with BFJA Award for Best Actress for her role in the National Award winning Bengali film Bhagini Nivedita (1962) directed by Bijoy Bose. In 1967, at the 14th National Film Awards, she received the National Film Award for Best Film Based On High Literary Work for her directorial debut Chutti.

== Early life ==
Arundhati was born in Barisal, Bengal Presidency, in British India (now Bangladesh).

== Personal life ==
At a time when women were marginalized and society looked down upon women from the movies, Maa came across as a strong personality. She was just 35 when she left her abusive husband and moved out with her 14-year-old daughter and me. I was just nine months old then. She built a house for herself and staged a comeback to the movies.

— Anindya Sinha

Arundhati Devi married Indian director Prabhat Mukherjee in 1940. She gave birth to her daughter Anuradha Ghosh in 1941 and son Anindya Sinha in 1954. They separated in 1955.

In 1957, she married Tapan Sinha whom she was acquainted with, at the Berlin International. Tapan Sinha adopted Anindya Sinha. She died on 16 October 1990.

== Filmography ==
=== As actress ===
- 1976 Harmonium
- 1965 Surer Agun
- 1964 Jatugriha as Madhuri
- 1963 Nyayadanda
- 1962 Shiulibari
- 1962 Bhagini Nivedita as Sister Nivedita
- 1961 Jhinder Bondi
- 1960 Khudita Pashan
- 1960 Indradhanu
- 1960 Akash-Patal
- 1959 Bicharak (she became a Producer)
- 1959 Shashi Babur Sansar
- 1959 Pushpadhanu
- 1958 Kala Mati
- 1958 Shikar
- 1958 Manmoyee Girls' School as Niharika
- 1957 Panchatapa
- 1956 Chalachal
- 1956 Nabajanma
- 1955 Dashyumohan as Chapala alias Miss Sandhya Ray
- 1955 Du-janay
- 1955 Godhuli
- 1954 Chheley Kaar as Mili
- 1954 Nad-o-Nadi
- 1952 Mahaprasthaner Pathey as Rani
- 1952 Yatrik as Rani (the Hindi Version of the well-known Bengali film Maha Prasthaner Pathe, in which she played the same role of Rani)

=== As director ===
- 1985 Gokul
- 1983 Deepar Prem
- 1972 Padi Pishir Barmi Baksha
- 1969 Megh o Roudra
- 1967 Chhuti (also script writer and music composer)
