= Tapan Sinha =

Indian film director (1924–2009)

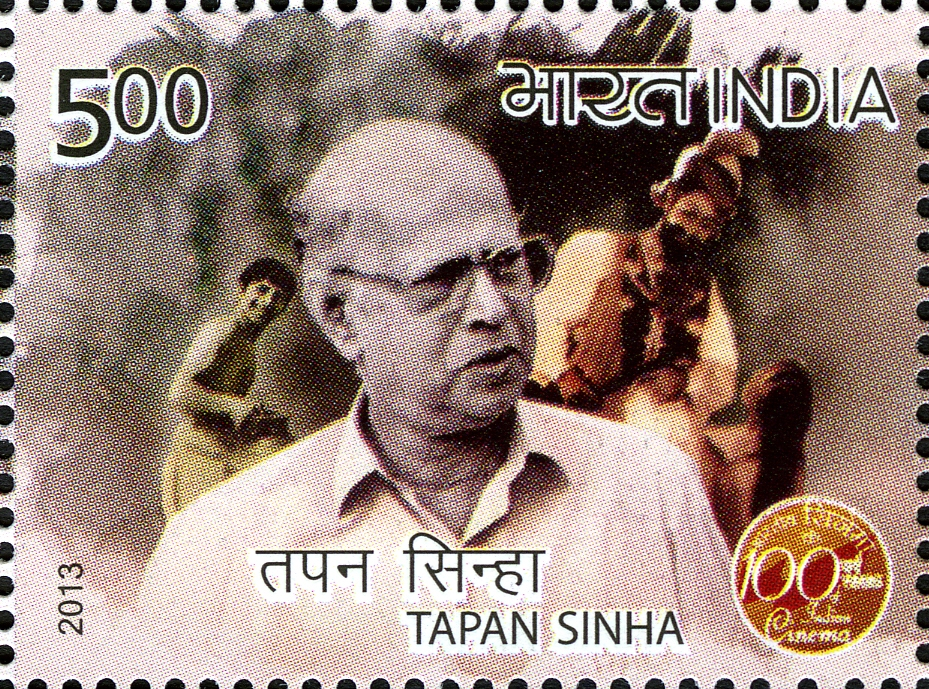
- Sinha on a 2013 stamp of India
- Born: 2 October 1924; Murshidabad, Bengal Presidency, British India (present-day Murshidabad, West Bengal, India)
- Died: 15 January 2009 (aged 84); Kolkata, West Bengal, India
- Education: University of Patna (B.Sc.) Rajabazar Science College (M.Sc.) University of Calcutta
- Years active: 1946–2001
- Spouse: Arundhati Devi (m. 1957; death 1990)
- Children: Anindya Sinha
- Awards: Dadasaheb Phalke Award (2006)

Tapan Sinha (2 October 1924 – 15 January 2009) was one of the most prominent Indian film directors of his time, forming a legendary quartet with Satyajit Ray, Ritwik Ghatak and Mrinal Sen. Primarily a Bengali filmmaker, he worked in both Hindi cinema and Bengali cinema, directing films like Kabuliwala (1957), Louha-Kapat, Sagina Mahato (1970), Apanjan (1968), Kshudhita Pashan and children's film Safed Haathi (1978) and Aaj Ka Robinhood. Sinha started his career in 1946, as a sound engineer with New Theatres film production house in Kolkata, then in 1950 left for England where he worked at Pinewood Studios for the next two years, before returning home to start his six decade long career in Indian cinema, making films in Bengali, Hindi and Oriya languages, straddling genres from social realism, family drama, labor rights, to children's fantasy films. He was an acclaimed filmmaker of the parallel cinema movement of India.

== Personal life and background ==
Sinha was born in Murshidabad, West Bengal. His empathy for films began from his student life. He was admitted in the Durgacharan M. E. School of Bhagalpur in the fifth standard. Later it went on to become a secondary school. His Principal was Surendranath Gangopadhyay who happened to be Sarat Chandra Chattopadhyay's maternal uncle. He studied physics at the University of Patna and later earned an M.Sc. at the Rajabazar Science College, University of Calcutta.

He married Indian actress Arundhati Devi. Their son is Indian scientist professor, Anindya Sinha.

On 15 January 2009, he died of pneumonia and septicaemia.

== Career ==
Charles Dickens's novel, A Tale of Two Cities and the cinematic adaptation featuring Ronald Colman inspired Sinha to get involved in film-making. Tapan Sinha went to London in the 1950s to learn film-making. On reaching London, he contacted CryHearsth, Manager of Pinewood Studios. Through his help, he managed to obtain his first assignment. He got to work in director Charles Crichton's unit as a sound engineer. Cryton, who made some British comedies like The Lavender Hill Mob etc. was then working for a film called The Hunted. Sinha started as a sound recording engineer and gradually shifted to directing.

Tapan Sinha was greatly influenced by contemporary American and British Cinema, in his youth. Among his favourite directors were John Ford, Carol Reed, and Billy Wilder. He used to think that he had to make films on the lines of his favourites. Rabindranath Tagore's work had been a great source of inspiration to him as well. Different Tagore works had special significance to him in various moments of his life.

Sinha's first film, Ankush, is based on the Narayan Ganguly's story Sainik, which had an elephant as the central character. He made a few documentaries, including a biographical film on scientist Jagadish Bose. He also used Rabindrasangeet in other films.

Across his career, he directed three major adaptations of Tagore’s works—Kabuliwala (1957), Kshudhita Pashan (1960), and Atithi (1965)—each marking a milestone in how the author's vision was communicated to a mass audience without compromising its philosophical depth.

Throughout 1960s, Sinha received widespread critical acclaim and commercial success by directing films from various genre- the epic period film Jhinder Bondi (1961), the dramas like Nirjan Saikate (1963) and Jatugriha (1964), the comedy Galpo Holeo Satti and the social-drama Hatey Bazarey. He further made a trilogy on the youth of Bengal that consisted Apanjan (1968), Ekhoni (1971) and Raja (1975).

Sinha's Sagina Mahato might be categorized as a political film, although it was reactionary in nature and was a direct attack on left-wing politics. It tried to disrepute organized struggle by championing the individual heroism of a worker. The Hindi version of the film, named "Sagina", also stars Dilp Kumar as the central character. The film was entered into the 7th Moscow International Film Festival.

Sinha's Ek Je Chilo Desh is a fantasy film, based on a story by Shankar.

His Daughters of This Century Starring Shabana Azmi, Jaya Bachchan, Madhuri Dixit, Nandita Das, Deepa Sahi, and Sulabha Deshpande in central roles, marked a new beginning in Indian Cinema.

Raja Sen's documentary on Tapan Sinha is entitled Filmmaker for Freedom.

Sinha's wife, filmmaker and actress Arundhuti Devi, died in 1990.

Sinha's final venture, the children's filme Anokha Moti, was incomplete. The film stars Arjun Chakravorty, and is being made in Hindi.

Sinha composed the music for many of his films. At the end of his career, he composed the music for the Bengali film Tara, directed by Bratya Basu, which was released after his death.

== Death ==
On 15 January 2009, he died of pneumonia and septicaemia.

== Legacy ==
In January 2010, the then railway minister Mamata Banerjee, laid the foundation stone of the Tapan Sinha Memorial Metro Hospital, at Tollygunge, Kolkata. Tapan's works left an impact and influence on Bollywood filmmakers like Hemen Gupta, Hrishikesh Mukherjee, Gulzar, Ashutosh Gowariker and Bengali filmmakers like Raja Sen, Kamaleshwar Mukherjee. His work highly influence and impact and popular culture by Bengali filmmaker Tarun Majumdar and Nowadays, Suman Ghosh (director). While in London, he was exposed to the works of Italian directors Federico Fellini, Vittorio De Sica and Roberto Rossellini. Tapan Sinha has also served as a member of the jury in the popular film festivals at Tashkent and San Francisco among others. Tapan Sinha has been selected for the Dada Saheb Phalke Award for the year 2006 for his outstanding contribution to Indian cinema.

== Television career ==
Aadmi Aur Aurat is based on a story by Prafulla Roy. Amol Palekar and Mahua Roy Choudhury acted in this telefilm. Aadmi Aur Aurat was remade in Bengali as Manush (starring Samit Bhanja and Devika Mukherjee) by the director himself. Sinha made another telefilm Didi with Deepti Naval as the central character. Sinha made a detective TV serial Hutumer Naksa.

== Awards ==
Civilian award

- Padma Shri (1992)

National Film Awards

- 1956: National Film Award for Best Feature Film – Kabuliwala
- 1956: National Film Award for Best Feature Film in Bengali – Kabuliwala
- 1957: National Film Award for Best Feature Film in Bengali – Louhakapat
- 1960: National Film Award for Second Best Feature Film – Kshudhita Pashan
- 1965: National Film Award for Second Best Feature Film – Atithi
- 1967: National Film Award for Best Feature Film- Hatey Bazarey
- 1968: National Film Award for Best Feature Film in Bengali- Apanjan
- 1971: Best Screenplay – Ekhonee
- 1977: National Film Award for Best Children's Film - Safed Haathi
- 1981: National Film Award for Best Feature Film in Bengali- Adalat o Ekti Meye
- 1984: Nargis Dutt Award for Best Feature Film on National Integration - Aadmi Aur Aurat
- 1990: Best Direction – Ek Doctor Ki Maut
- 1990: National Film Award for Second Best Feature Film- Ek Doctor Ki Maut
- 1994: National Film Award for Best Film on Other Social Issues- Wheelchair
- 2006: Dadasaheb Phalke Award

International Awards

1. Best Film-Cork festival, Ireland for Khudhita Pashan
2. Silver Bear Extraordinary Prize of the Jury at 7th Berlin International Film Festival for Kabuliwala
3. Jury Award-Sanfransisco Film Festival for Hansuli Banker Upokotha
4. Silver Peacock-2nd best film, International Film Festival of India & Audience Award, Sydney Film Festival for Nirjan Saikate
5. International Certificate of Merit, Venice Film Festival for Atithi
6. Diploma of Merit, London Film Festival for Aarohi
7. Silver Leopard, Locarno Film Festival for Aarohi
8. Award for Best Film-Royal Cup, Cambodia Asian Film festival for Hatey Bazarey
9. Award for Best film in 13th Asia Pacific Film Festival for Hatey Bazarey
10. Silver trophy (Cup of honour) in Phnom Penh Film Festival for Hatey Bazarey
11. Afro-Asian Award, Moscow International Film Festival for Sagina Mahato
12. Golden Crown for Best Music, Seoul Asian Film Festival]]12 for Harmonium
13. Special Award 'Child of our Time', Vii Film Festival, Milano for Safed Haathi
14. UNICEF Award(Honorable Mention), Berlin International Film Festival for Aaj Ka Robin Hood

== Filmography ==
=== Films ===
Year	Title	Note	Ref.
1954	Ankush		
1955	Upahar		
1956	Tonsil		
1957	Kabuliwala		
1958	Louhakapat		
1958	Kala Mati		
1959	Kshaniker Atithi		
1960	Kshudhita Pashan		
1961	Jhinder Bandi		
1962	Hansuli Banker Upakatha		
1962	Aamar Desh	Documentary	
1963	Nirjan Saikate		
1964	Jatugriha		
1964	Arohi		
1965	Atithi		
1966	Galpo Holeo Satti		
1967	Hatey Bazarey		
1968	Apanjan		
1970	Sagina Mahato		
1971	Ekhoni		
1972	Zindagi Zindagi		
1973	Aandhar Periye		
1974	Sagina		
1975	Raja		
1976	Harmonium		
1977	Ek Je Chhilo Desh		
1978	Safed Haathi		
1979	Sabuj Dwiper Raja		
1980	Banchharamer Bagan		
1982	Adalat o Ekti Meye		
1982	Aadmi Aur Aurat		
1983	Manush		
1984	Didi		
1985	Baidurya Rahasya		
1986	Atanka		
1987	Aaj Ka Robin Hood		
1991	Ek Doctor Ki Maut		
1992	Antardhan		
1994	Wheel Chair		
1994	Ajana Shatru	Documentary	
1995	Daughters of This Century		
1998	Ajab Gayer Ajab Katha		
2000	Anokha Moti		

=== TV series ===
Year	Title	Cast
1998	Hutumer Naksha	

== See also ==
- Raja Sen
- Aparna Sen
- Tarun Majumdar
- Birsa Dasgupta
- Suman Ghosh
