= Rajbansha =

1977 Bengali action film by Pijush Basu

- Theatrical poster of Rajbansha
- Directed by: Pijush Basu
- Written by: Pijush Basu
- Story by: Pijush Basu
- Produced by: Asim Sarkar
- Starring: Uttam Kumar; Arati Bhattacharya; Prema Narayan; Bikash Roy; Dilip Roy
- Cinematography: Bijoy Ghosh
- Edited by: Baidyanath Chatterjee
- Music by: Shyamal Mitra
- Production company: Usha Films
- Distributed by: Chandimata Films Pvt. Ltd.
- Release date: 7 January 1977
- Country: India
- Language: Bengali

Rajbansha (Bengali pronunciation: [rad͡ʒbɔŋʃo]; transl. Dynasty) is a 1977 Indian Bengali-language action film written and directed by Pijush Basu. Produced by Asim Sarkar under the banner of Usha Films, the film stars Uttam Kumar in dual roles, alongside Arati Bhattacharya, Prema Narayan, Bikash Roy, Dilip Roy and Chhaya Devi in other pivotal roles. It focuses on Bhairav Narayan, the king of the Mainabati Estate, who refuses to acknowledge his illegitimate son Pratap Narayan as his own child and a member of the royal dynasty, which leads the latter to become utterly psychotic and to murder his father in retaliation for the humiliation inflicted upon his mother.

The film marks the eighth collaboration between Basu and Kumar, and also pairs the latter with Bhattacharya for the third time. Shyamal Mitra composed the music of the film, with lyrics penned by Gauriprasanna Mazumder. Its cinematography and editing were handled by Bijoy Ghosh and Baidyanath Chatterjee respectively.

Rajbansha was theatrically released on 7 January 1977, on the occasion of Sankranti. Opening to mixed reviews, the film became a commercial success and emerged as one of the highest-grossing Bengali films of the year. It gained a specific attention for Kumar's portrayal of an anti-hero for the seventh time, and also created a record in the combined sales of the original soundtrack and dialogues (released separately). It was remade into Telugu as Chanda Sasanudu in 1983, starring NTR.

== Plot ==
Tagar was a trusted attendant to the Queen of the Mainabati estate. Their loyalties are shattered when Bhairav Narayan Sinha, the King of the estate, subjects her to fulfill his lust. The shame and trauma force the mother and son to flee the royal household. She gives birth to Bhairav's illegitimate son Pratap Narayan. They endure great hardship, eventually leading to the mother's untimely death.

Bearing a deep grudge and a thirst to avenge his mother's humiliation, Pratap returns to the royal estate as an adult, and leaves his aspiration to be a doctor. He infiltrates the circles of those who wronged his family and methodically sets out to exact his revenge. Throughout this dark journey, Pratap hunts down and murders the individuals responsible for destroying his family's dignity.

Driven by a warped but deeply felt sense of justice, Pratap successfully eliminates three people involved in his mother's mistreatment. After carrying out his revenge, Pratap concludes his arc by voluntarily turning himself in and confessing to his crimes at the local police station.

== Cast ==
- Uttam Kumar in dual roles as
  - Bhairav Narayan Sinha / Raja Bahadur
  - Pratap Narayan Sinha / Kumar Bahadur, Bhairav's illegitimate Son
- Arati Bhattacharya as Shibani, Pratap's wife
- Prema Narayan as Putul
- Dilip Roy as Raj Narayan Sinha, Bhairav's second son
- Bikash Roy as Shibani's father
- Chhaya Devi as Bhairav's sister
- Tarun Kumar as Bhairav's manager
- Shambhu Bhattacharya as Ramprasaad Sarkar

== Soundtrack ==
Rajbansha

Soundtrack album to Rajbansha by Shyamal Mitra
- Released: 1977
- Genre: Feature Film Soundtrack
- Length: 17:26
- Label: Saregama
- Producer: Shyamal Mitra

Shyamal Mitra chronology
Ami, Shey O Shakha (1975)	Rajbansha (1977)	Ajasra Dhanyabad (1977)
External audio
- Rajbansha Audio Jukebox on YouTube

The music of Rajbansha was composed by Shyamal Mitra, in his second collaboration with Basu. It also marks his twelfth collaboration with Kumar after Lakh Taka (1953), Shakher Chor (1960), Bhranti Bilas (1963), Deya Neya (1963), Rajkanya (1965), Garh Nasimpur (1968), Jiban Jigyasa (1971), Andha Atit (1972), Bon Palashir Padabali (1973), Amanush (1974) and Ami, Shey O Shakha (1975). The soundtrack contains five tracks, each penned by Gauriprasanna Mazumder.

Track listing
No.	Title	Singer(s)	Length
1.	"Karo Janmer Jonye"	Shyamal Mitra	3:42
2.	"Chal Chal Phire Chal"	Sandhya Mukherjee, Arundhati Holme Chowdhury	3:29
3.	"Mahuate Hoy Na Nesha (Male)"	Manna Dey	4:18
4.	"E To Putul Khela Noy"	Manna Dey	3:13
5.	"Mahuate Hoy Na Nesha (Female)"	Sandhya Mukherjee	2:43
Total length:			17:26

== Legacy ==
In Rajbansha, Kumar played two negative characters (both Bhairav and Pratap), in his seventh appearance in anti-heroic role, after Kuhak (1960), Sesh Anka (1963), Lal Pathore (1964), Aparichita (1969), Alo Amar Alo (1972), Duti Mon (1970), Stree (1972), Bagh Bondi Khela (1975) and Banhishikha (1976). Subhadeep Banerjee of Bangla Live considered these performances as "grey but not villainous" and opined "When Uttam Kumar played a negative character as well as the so-called villain, he effortlessly changed the traditional pattern of having a hero opposite the villain throughout the film—he is both the hero and the villain".

In an interview to Millennium Post, filmmaker Srijit Mukherji quoted "If I would have been given a chance to cast Uttam Kumar, I would have cast him as an antagonist. I absolutely loved him playing negative roles in Rajbansha, Bagh Bondi Khela and Sesh Anka".
