= Nidhiram Sardar =

1976 Bengali action film by Rabi Ghosh

- Directed by: Rabi Ghosh
- Screenplay by: Ashok Ghoshal
- Story by: Ashok Ghoshal
- Produced by: Deepen Bhattacharya
- Starring: Uttam Kumar; Aparna Sen; Utpal Dutt; Subhendu Chatterjee; Tarun Kumar
- Cinematography: Soumendu Roy
- Edited by: Ramesh Joshi
- Music by: Ananda Shankar
- Production company: Subhadeep Chitram
- Distributed by: Suchandrima
- Release date: 24 September 1976
- Country: India
- Language: Bengali

Nidhiram Sardar (Bengali pronunciation: [nidhiɾam sɔrdɑr]) is a 1976 Indian Bengali-language vigilante action film directed by Rabi Ghosh in his debut. Produced by Deepen Bhattacharya under the banner of Subhadeep Chitram, the film stars Uttam Kumar in the titular role, alongside Aparna Sen, Utpal Dutt, Subhendu Chatterjee, Tarun Kumar and Ajitesh Banerjee in other pivotal roles.

Written by Ashok Ghoshal, the film drew inspirations from the folklores of Robin Hood, while Ghosh himself cited the film as a felicitation to Wolfshead (1969) and Magnum Force (1973). Music of the film is composed by Ananda Shankar, with lyrics penned by Gauriprasanna Mazumder. Soumendu Roy handled its cinematography and Ramesh Joshi did the editing.

Nidhiram Sardar was theatrically released on 24 September 1976, coinciding with Durga Puja. It became moderately successful at the box-office, and received mixed reviews: praise for its action sequences, cinematography and cast performances, and criticism for the slow-paced editing, screenplay and storyline. It was remade into Telugu as Gharana Donga (1980) starring Krishna.

== Plot ==
Suddenly, a thief known as Nidhiram Sardar completely transforms the lives of the Kolkata Police. He steals from unscrupulous businessmen and distributes the loot among the poor. Mr. Gangaram, an import-export merchant, finds himself in a confrontation at the Hotel Love Bird. The hotel's owner—a quirky, high-profile criminal named Sitesh Pyne, becomes deeply alarmed by this incident. Meanwhile, Yamini, a smart young woman and the sole breadwinner of a middle-class family, suddenly begins facing certain difficulties. She finds herself being regularly stalked by some unidentified anti-social elements. In this predicament, she seeks assistance from Ram Prasad Singha, a renowned singer. Ram Prasad, a man of courage guided by his own strong moral principles sets out to uncover the truth behind the problem. He puts forth his utmost effort and, with the help of his relative Mallick and his old friend Sanjay, successfully solves the case.

== Cast ==
- Uttam Kumar as Ram Prasad Sinha, a singer / Nidhiram Sardar, a thief and Robin Hood-like figure
- Aparna Sen as Yamini
- Nanditha Bose
- Subhendu Chatterjee as Sanjay, the editor of the magazine Tritiyo Chokkhu
- Utpal Dutt as Shitesh Pyne
- Tarun Kumar
- Sushil Majumder
- Haradhan Banerjee as ACP Bose
- Ajitesh Banerjee
- Shambhu Bhattacharya
- Gita Dey

=== Special appearance ===
- Rabi Ghosh as Mr. Gangaram

== Soundtrack ==
Nidhiram Sardar

Soundtrack album to Nidhiram Sardar by Ananda Shankar
- Released: 1976
- Genre: Feature Film Soundtrack
- Length: 8:26
- Language: Bengali
- Label: Saregama
- Producer: Ananda Shankar

Ananda Shankar chronology
Asamay (1976)	Nidhiram Sardar (1970)	Dui Prithibi (1980)
External audio
- Nidhiram Sardar Audio Jukebox on YouTube

Track listing
No.	Title	Singer(s)	Length
1.	"Shyam O Radha Bina"	Manabendra Mukherjee	2:47
2.	"Dekhina Ki Korte Paro"	Aarti Mukherjee	3:17
3.	"Na Na Na"	Aarti Mukherjee	2:21
Total length:			8:26

== Trivia ==
Actor Saswata Chatterjee, who was six years old in 1976, recalled visiting the set of Nidhiram Sardar with his father Subhendu Chatterjee. He recounted that Bhanu Banerjee was shooting for a different film on the very same set. He further mentioned that upon watching a shot of a humorous scene featuring Bhanu, he burst into loud laughter—a reaction that delighted the latter, who then confidently declared that this film was bound to be a hit. Subsequently, he took Saswata onto his lap, shared many stories with him, and later even posed for a photograph together.
