= Mem Saheb =

1972 film

- মেম সাহেব
- Directed by: Pinaki Mukherjee
- Written by: Nimai Bhattacharya
- Screenplay by: Pinaki Mukherjee
- Based on: Mam Saheb by Nimai Bhattachariya
- Produced by: Ashima Bhattacharya
- Starring: Uttam Kumar; Gita Dey; Sumitra Mukherjee; Bikash Roy; Aparna Sen; Jahor Roy
- Cinematography: Krishna Chakraborty
- Edited by: Rabin Das
- Music by: Ashima Bhattacharya
- Production company: Pompy Films
- Distributed by: Debali Pictures Pvt. Ltd.
- Release date: 1972
- Running time: 122 min.
- Country: India
- Language: Bengali

Mem Saheb is a 1972 Bengali film directed by Pinaki Mukherjee who also acts in this film. The film was produced by Ashima Bhattacharya and production company by Pompy Films. The story was based on the novel of same name by Nimai Bhattachariya. The film's music was composed by Ashima Bhattacharya. This film won the Filmfare Awards East in 1972. It stars Uttam Kumar and Aparna Sen in the lead roles. Others such as Gita Dey, Sumitra Mukherjee, Bikash Roy, and Jahor Roy play supporting roles.

Director Pinaki Mukherjee did a superb job by combining the political world and romance of that period. Aparna Sen excelled as the young, educated Professor, who falls in love with a hotshot journalist played by Kumar. While both stand for each other and dream for a happy future, this is cut short by political violence. This film, despite its romantic elements, brought the ethics of journalism to the big screen.

== Cast ==
- Uttam Kumar as Amit
- Aparna Sen as Kajal
- Gita Dey
- Sumitra Mukherjee
- Bikash Roy
- Jahor Roy
- Lolita Chatterjee
- Dilip Mukherjee
- Pinaki Mukherjee
- Gour Shee

== Production ==
The film was directed by Pinaki Bhusan Mukherjee and produced by Ashima Bhattachriya, who also composed the music. This producer-director duo worked with Uttam Kumar before in the cult hit Chowrangee in 1968. At first the role of Kajal Suchitra Sen was the first choice but later she was found not suitable for this role then Aparna Sen was selected instead. The indoor scenes of the film were shot in Technicians Studio and NT Studio 2 (New Theaters).

== Soundtrack ==
Mem Saheb

Soundtrack album by Ashima Bhattacharya
- Released: 1972
- Recorded: 1971
- Studio: Pompy Films
- Genre: Feature Film Soundtrack
- Length: 8:27
- Label: Angel Digital Private Limited
- Producer: Ashima Bhattacharya

Ashima Bhattacharya chronology
Chowringhee (1968)	Mem Saheb (1972)	Bagh Bondi Khela (1975)

All lyrics are written by Rabindranath Tagore, Atul Prasad Sen, Miltoo Ghosh; all music is composed by Rabindranath Tagore, Ashima Bhattachariya.

Songs
No.	Title	Playback	Length
1.	"Emon Sondhay Aakashe"	Ashima Bhattacharya	03:07
2.	"Aaj Bujhi Pakhira"	Manna Dey, Ashima Bhattacharya	02:55
3.	"Badhu Emono Badole"	Ashima Bhattacharya	02:25
Total length:			08:27

== Reception ==
This is one of the best films in both Uttam Kumar and Aparna Sen's career. Uttam Kumar's performance became greatly acclaimed. The Times Of India wrote: "Uttam Kumar, playing her male counterpart, turns out to be her only inspiration. In this romantic drama, the legendary actor essayed out a hotshot journalist who enjoys great connections to several political personalities". The film became a blockbuster hit and ran to full houses for 12 consecutive weeks and ran over 100 days in theaters. The film also became one of the highest grossing Bengali films of 1972.

== Awards ==
Ceremony	Award	Category	Nominee	Outcome
3rd Filmfare Awards East	Filmfare Awards East	Best Film	Pinaki Mukherjee	Won
