= Chowringhee (disambiguation) =

Chowringhee is a neighbourhood in central Kolkata, West Bengal, India.

Chowringhee may also refer to:

- Chowringhee (novel), a 1962 Bengali-language novel by Indian writer Sankar
  - Chowringhee (film), a 1968 Indian film based on the novel

== See also ==
- 36 Chowringhee Lane, a 1981 Indian film
- Chauranghee, a 1942 Indian film
- Chauranga, a 2014 Indian film
