= Bagh Bondi Khela =

1975 Bengali political action thriller film

- Directed by: Pijush Basu
- Written by: Prafulla Roy; Pijush Basu (screenplay)
- Based on: Prothom Tarar Alo novel by Prafulla Roy
- Produced by: Asima Bhattacharya
- Starring: Uttam Kumar; Supriya Devi; Partho Mukherjee; Mahua Roychoudhury
- Cinematography: Ganesh Bose
- Edited by: Baidyanath Chatterjee
- Music by: Dipankar Chattopadhyay<br >Asima Mukherjee (background score)
- Production company: Pompy Films
- Distributed by: Bishwajit Films
- Release date: 19 December 1975 (India)
- Running time: 127 minutes
- Country: India
- Language: Bengali

Bagh Bondi Khela (transl. The Caged Tiger Game) is a 1975 Indian Bengali-language political action thriller film co-written and directed by Pijush Basu. Produced by Ashima Bhattacharya, the film is based on Prafulla Roy's novel titled Prothom Tarar Alo. It stars Uttam Kumar, Supriya Devi, Partha Mukherjee and Mahua Roy Chowdhury in lead roles, while Tarun Kumar, Asit Baran, Tarun Mitra and Kalyani Mondal play supporting roles. It revolves around a businessman who enters into politics through unethical means.

The film marks fifth of the frequent collaborations between Basu and Kumar. The soundtrack of the film was composed by Dipankar Chattopadhyay in her debut, with lyrics penned by Pulak Bandyopadhyay and score by Ashima Mukherjee. The cinematography was handled by Ganesh Bose, while Baidyanath Chatterjee edited the film.

Bagh Bondi Khela theatrically released on 19 December 1975, coinciding with Christmas. It was a super-hit at the box office and ran for over 170 days in theatres. Apart from emerging as a major financial success, the film has become a cult film over the years due to its suspense, story, screenplay, soundtrack and performances of the cast. The film is considered to be Uttam Kumar’s best appearance as an anti-hero.

== Plot ==
Bhabesh Banerjee is a corrupt, ruthless businessman in Ranipur, heavily involved in smuggling and immoral trafficking. His son Rajesh is an honest man who loves Dolon. Bhabesh cheated Dolon's father using counterfeit documents. When Rajesh comes to visit his father, Bhabesh gifts all his properties to Rajesh for getting political mileage and enters into politics. Bhabesh's second wife Bibha knows the whole plot and reveals it to Rajesh. When the police come to arrest Bhabesh, he commits suicide.

== Cast ==
- Uttam Kumar as Bhabesh Banerjee
- Supriya Chowdhury as Bibha
- Partho Mukherjee as Rajesh
- Mahua Roychoudhury as Dolon
- Asit Baran as Dolon's father
- Samita Biswas as Bhabesh's first wife
- Sulata Chowdhury
- Kalyani Mondal
- Ashim Kumar
- Dilip Bose

== Production ==
The film is based on Prothom Tarar Alo novel written by Prafulla Roy. After reading the novel Uttam Kumar called Prafulla Roy to purchase the rights of the novel. Roy warned Kumar that this film won't work at the box office because people won't accepted Kumar as a criminal and antagonist. Despite his warning, Kumar took the risk and finally the film was made. Producer of the film is Ashima Bhattachariya under her production house Pompy Films with whom Kumar worked before hit films Chowrangee and Mamsaheb.

== Soundtrack ==
Bagh Bandi Khela

Soundtrack album by Dipankar Chatterjee
- Released: 1975
- Recorded: 1974
- Studio: Pompy Films
- Length: 0:07:12
- Label: SA RE GA MA PA
- Producer: Ashima Mukherjee

All lyrics are written by Pulak Banerjee; all music is composed by Dipankar Chatterjee.

Songs
No.	Title	Playback	Length
1.	"Aay Aay Aasmani Kabutar"	Hemanta Mukherjee	3:13
2.	"Tukro Hasir Tol Phoryara"	Manna Dey	3:59
Total length:			7:12

== Reception ==
=== Reviews ===
The Times of India wrote in an article "Even dirty politics become enjoyable when you have Uttam Kumar on the screen. However, his brilliant portrayal of a corrupt aspiring political leader is quite chilling to the bone. It’s also the mark of an elite actor to essay all that is related to a corrupt, lusty and greedy system."

During Kumar buy the rights of the novel writer Prafulla Roy told Kumar that the film don't worked at the box office but after film release it's get overwhelming response from the critics and audiences and become superhit. The film is remembered as Uttam Kumar's one of the first films he performed as an antagonist. Before this film, he also played negative characters in many movies, including Kuhak in 1960, Aparichita in 1969, Stree in 1972. The film become super hit at the box office.
