= Prem Patra =

- Directed by: Bimal Roy
- Written by: Screenplay: Debabrata Sengupta; Salil Chowdhury; Dialogues: Rajinder Krishan
- Story by: Nitan Bhattacharya
- Based on: Sagarika (Bengali)
- Produced by: Bimal Roy
- Starring: Shashi Kapoor; Sadhana
- Cinematography: Dilip Gupta
- Edited by: Amit Bose
- Music by: Salil Choudhury
- Release date: 1962
- Country: India
- Language: Hindi
- Box office: ₹ 3.8 million

Prem Patra (Hindi: प्रेमपत्र, transl. The love letter) is a 1962 Indian Hindi-language romantic drama film starring Shashi Kapoor and Sadhana. Produced and directed by Bimal Roy, it was a remake of the 1956 Bengali film Sagarika starring Uttam Kumar and Suchitra Sen.

== Cast ==
- Shashi Kapoor as Arun Kumar Mathur
- Sadhana as Kavita Kapoor / Tara Choudhary
- Praveen Choudhary as Ratna
- Seema Deo as Tara Choudhary
- Chand Usmani as Sunitra
- Rajendra nath as Kedar
- Kanu Roy as Barrister Kapoor
- Sudhir as Subhash
- Sadhana Khote

== Soundtrack ==
Song	Singer /Lyricist
"Ab Aur Na Kuch Bhi"	Lata Mangeshkar/ Rajinder Krishan
"Khush Ho Rahe The"	Lata Mangeshkar/ Rajinder Krishan
"Do Ankhiyan Jhuki Jhuki Si, Do Ankhiyan Jhuki Jhuki Si"	Lata Mangeshkar, Mukesh/Rajinder Krishan
"Sawan Ki Raaton Mein Aisa Bhi Hota Hai"	Lata Mangeshkar, Talat Mahmood/Gulzar
"Yeh Mere Andhere Ujale Na Hote Agar Tum Na Aate"	Lata Mangeshkar, Talat Mahmood/Rajinder Krishan

All the songs of the movie had been embellished with music by a well-known composer, Mr. Salil Chaudhary.

== Reception ==
In 2019, The Free Press Journal described the film as a "musical gem" with "a sweet love story", making it very different from Bimal Roy's other films.
