= Sathi Hara =

1961 Bengali drama film

Sathi Hara is a Bengali romantic drama film directed by Sukumar Dasgupta produced by Rakhal Chandra Saha. This film was released on 2 March 1961. Renowned author and filmmaker Premendra Mitra served as the script writer of the film.

== Plot ==
Kundan and Rupa are two gypsy couple living by singing and performing street plays together. One music director Sujan, offers Kundan a big career break. Rupa convinces reluctant Kundan to accept the deal with Sujan but later it causes emotional misunderstandings between them.

== Cast ==
- Uttam Kumar as Kundan
- Mala Sinha as Rupa
- Tarun Kumar as Sujan
- Jahor Roy
- Gita Dey
- Nripati Chatterjee
- Rajlakshmi Devi
- Barun Dutta
