= Ekhane Pinjar =

1971 Bengali film

Ekhane Pinjar is a Bengali crime drama film directed by Tarun Majumder (Yatrik) based on the novel of Prafulla Roy. The film was released on 22 January 1971 under the banner of Mitali Films. The music director of this film was Bhupen Hazarika. For this film, Uttam Kumar won the Bengal Film Journalists' Association – Best Actor Award (BFJA) in 1972. A Hindi remake of the film Atithee was made in 1978.

== Plot ==
The story begins when the writer Amal Basu meets Nabendu Chatterjee, a young, educated man who has been driven into petty crime and smuggling by unemployment and poverty. Amal comes to understand that Nabendu's criminal activities are closely connected to his difficult circumstances. After helping him obtain an early release from custody, Nabendu asks him to help find an honest job so that he can support his impoverished family. Amal genuinely tries to find employment for him, but his efforts are unsuccessful. With no other means of supporting his family, desperate Nabendu eventually returns to criminal activities and is killed in a police encounter.

Amal travels to Nabendu’s ancestral village, initially intending to deliver the news and leave. There, he realizes that Nabendu's family is living in poor condition. Nabendu's parents and younger siblings are living in severe financial hardship. Their house is mortgaged, and the influential local moneylender Abinash Mitra is trying to take advantage of the family's vulnerable situation and acquire their property. Amal also discovers that Nabendu's sister, Neela, has become involved in smuggling. Like her brother, she has been pushed towards illegal activities by the family's desperate economic circumstances.

Gradually, Amal becomes emotionally involved in their lives and finds himself unable to walk away.

== Cast ==
- Uttam Kumar as Amal Basu
- Aparna Sen as Neela
- Gangapada Basu as Abinash Mitra
- Dilip Mukherjee as Nabendu
- Bhanu Bannerjee
- Jahor Roy
- Gyanesh Mukherjee
- Ratna Ghoshal
- Tarun Kumar
- Kalyan Chatterjee
- Parijat Bose
