= Dui Purush =

Dui Purush (lit. 'Two Men') may refer to these Indian films:

- Dui Purush (1945 film), a 1945 Bengali film
- Dui Purush (1978 film), a 1978 Bengali film

== See also ==
- Two Men (disambiguation)
