= Nastaneer =

1951 film by Pashupati Chatterjee

- Directed by: Pashupati Chatterjee
- Written by: Sashisekhar Sharma
- Screenplay by: Pashupati Chatterjee (Dialogues)
- Story by: Rabindranath Tagore
- Based on: Nashtanir novel by Rabindranath Tagore
- Produced by: Tarak Pal
- Starring: Sunanda Banerjee; Uttam Kumar; Dhiraj das Kamal Mitra
- Cinematography: Sushanta Moitra
- Edited by: Kamal Ganguly
- Music by: Rabin Chattopadhyay
- Production company: M.P Productions
- Distributed by: D Looks Entertainment
- Release date: 1951
- Country: India
- Language: Bengali

Nastaneer (transl. The Broken Nest) is a Bengali-language drama film directed by Pashupati Chatterjee. This movie was released in 1951 under the banner of M. P. Productions Pvt. Ltd. The music direction was done by Rabin Chattopadhyay. This film stars Uttam Kumar, Sunanda Banerjee, Dhiraj Das who played in lead roles where Karabi Gupta and Kamal Mitra played the supporting roles. This is the fifth film of Uttam Kumar. The film is based on the novella Nastanirh of Rabindranath Tagore wrote in 1901. Later Satyajit Ray made a film based on this same novel Charulata in 1964.

== Plot ==
Nastanirh takes place in late 19th-century Bengal and explores the lives of the "Bhadralok", Bengalis of wealth who were part of the Bengal Renaissance and highly influenced by the Brahmo Samaj. Despite his liberal ideas, Bhupati is blind to the loneliness and dissatisfaction of his wife, Charu. It is only with the appearance of his cousin, Amal, who incites passionate feelings in Charu, that Bhupati realizes what he has lost.

== Cast ==
- Uttam Kumar as Amal
- Sunanda Banerjee as Charu
- Dhiraj Das as Bhupati
- Goutam Mukhopadhyay
- Kamal Mitra
- Karabi Gupta
- Nibhanani Devi
- Rajlakshmi Devi
- Santosh Singha
- Sikharani Bag

== Soundtrack ==
Nashtaneer

Soundtrack album by Rabin Chatterjee
- Released: 1951
- Recorded: 1950
- Studio: M.P Productions
- Genre: Feature Film Soundtrack
- Length: 0:11:56
- Label: Jio Saavan

Rabin Chatterjee chronology
Ratnadeep (1951)	Nashtaneer (1951)	Subhadra (1951)

All lyrics are written by Sailen Roy; all music is composed by Rabin Chatterjee.

Songs
No.	Title	Playback	Length
1.	"Kon Mayamriga Dhara Dile"	Alpana Banerjee	2:58
2.	"Jadi Chhoan Lage Mone"	Sachin Gupta, Alpana Banerjee	3:07
3.	"Ankhi Meli Chao"	Madhabi Ghosh	2:40
4.	"Keno Chharao Phulban"	Dhananjay Bhattacharya	3:11
Total length:			11:56
