= Dui Prithibi (1980 film) =

- Directed by: Pijush Basu
- Based on: Sheet Grishwe Onek Ritu by Sounak Gupta
- Screenplay by: Pijush Basu
- Story by: Sounak Gupta
- Produced by: Uttam Kumar
- Starring: Uttam Kumar; Ranjit Mallick; Victor Banerjee; Supriya Chowdhury; Tanusree Shankar; Prosenjit Chatterjee
- Cinematography: Bijoy Ghosh
- Edited by: Baidyanath Chatterjee
- Music by: Ananda Shankar
- Production company: Shilpi Sangshad
- Distributed by: Shree Ranjit Pictures
- Release date: 1980
- Running time: 141 minutes
- Country: India
- Language: Bengali

Dui Prithibi (Bengali pronunciation: [dui pʰr̩iˈbʱi]; transl. Two Worlds) is a 1980 Bengali-language crime drama film co-written and directed by Pijush Basu. Produced by Uttam Kumar under the banner of Shilpi Sangshad, the film stars Kumar himself, alongside an ensemble cast of Ranjit Mallick, Victor Banerjee, Supriya Devi, Tanusree Shankar and Kalyani Mondal, with Prosenjit Chatterjee in a special appearance.

Ananda Shankar scored the music of the movie. The film is produced under the banner of Uttam's own foundation Shilpi Sangshad and this is the second film produced by Shilpi Sangshad.

== Plot ==
Mrinal Dutta, the elder son of the family, is a reporter and the sole earning member. He has a sister whose marriage is almost fixed with their music teacher. The climax starts building up when brother Kunal Dutta returns a rich businessman. He spends money lavishly and becomes the most powerful person in the family with a house and a car. The sister's marriage is suddenly called off and a new alliance is sought after with the principal of a music school. The monetary differences between the two brothers start stemming up in various forms. Kunal unexpectedly marries a girl whose father was a freedom fighter. Kunal, however is very rude to his wife and one day she finds some evidence of Kunal being involved in smuggling. Kunal is eventually proved a smuggler. This leads to more problems in the family and sibling relationships are on doldrums. The sister's fiancé takes advantage of her and impregnates her. During this time the police chase Kunal who comes begging for help from his brother. The police however arrest him and put him behind bars. After that the family pleads guilty. Kunal is punished for a term of 4 years. The sister's music teacher whom she ignored takes responsibility of his insensitive act and all is fine with the family after a brief period of turmoil.

== Cast ==
- Uttam Kumar as Mrinal Dutta
- Ranjit Mallick as Sukanto
- Kalyani Mondal as Tani
- Victor Banerjee as Kunal Dutta
- Supriya Chowdhury as Shibani
- Sushil Majumder as Mrinal's Father
- Sita Devi as Mrinal's Mother
- Prasenjit Chatterjee as Young Mrinal
- Tanushree Shankar as Suhas

== Production ==
This is the second film after the blockbuster Bon Palashir Padabali in 1973 produced by Uttam Kumar's foundation Shilpi Sangshad to help again to poor artists and technicians and just like that the all the top artists worked without any fees. The film was based on the novel Seet Gishwe Onek Ritu by Sounik Gupta. The music was written by composer Ananda Shankar. The film was directed and screenplayed by Pijush Bose with whom Uttam Kumar worked before memorable and hit films such as Sanyashi Raja, Bagh Bondi Khela in 1975, Banhisikha in 1976, Sabyasachi in 1977 Dhanraj Tamang in 1978 and Brajabuli in 1980. In the film the famous actor Prosenjit Chatterjee played Uttam's teenage role.

== Soundtrack ==
Dui Prithibi

Soundtrack album by Ananda Shankar
- Released: 1980
- Recorded: 1979
- Studio: Shilpi Sangshad
- Genre: Feature Film Soundtrack
- Length: 0:06:07
- Label: Angel Digital Pvt Ltd
- Producer: Uttam Kumar

All lyrics are written by Gouri Prasanna Majumdar; all music is composed by Ananda Shankar.

Songs
No.	Title	Playback	Length
1.	"Tumi Tanpura Sure Bandhe Nao"	Manna Dey, Aarti Mukherjee	3:07
2.	"Jhorer Mukhomukhi Darate Hole"	Manna Dey	3:00
Total length:			6:07

== Reception ==
It was a comeback film for Uttam Kumar. This film also gave him success after a long time. The film ran for 91 days in theaters. Critics praised his performance as Mrinal. This is also the last hit for Uttam during his lifetime.
