= Sagarika (1956 film) =

1956 film

- সাগরিকা
- Directed by: Agragami
- Written by: Agragami (Dialogues)
- Screenplay by: Agragami
- Produced by: Sukumar Kumar
- Starring: Uttam Kumar; Suchitra Sen
- Cinematography: Sudhangshu Ghosh; Narayan Chakraborty; Sambhu Ghosh; Amulya
- Edited by: Ramen Ghosh
- Music by: Robin Chatterjee
- Production company: S.C Productions
- Distributed by: D Looks Film Distributor limited
- Release date: 1 February 1956
- Running time: 128 minutes
- Country: India
- Language: Bengali

Sagarika is a 1956 Bengali romantic drama film directed by Agragami. The film has music composed by Robin Chatterjee. The film stars Uttam Kumar and Suchitra Sen as leads, with actors Jamuna Sinha, Namita Sinha, Kamal Mitra, Pahadi Sanyal, Jahar Ganguli, Anup Kumar in supporting roles.

== Plot ==
Medical student Arun, wants to travel to England to become a doctor, in fulfillment of his father's dying wish. Shipra, a naughty and insensitive girl, wants to marry Arun, but Arun falls in love with Sagarika, whom he meets in college.

Arun writes a love poem about Sagarika, which Shipra sends to Sagarika without Arun's knowledge. Offended, Sagarika reports Arun to the school administration, who cancel Arun's scholarship. Arun returns to his village, still determined to study medicine in England. Shipra confesses to Sagarika that she sent her the poem, and Sagarika feels guilty that Arun lost his scholarship.

Later, Arun travels to England to become a doctor and becomes engaged to Basanti, the daughter of his uncle. Sagarika, now in love with Arun, begins writing letters to Arun under Basanti's name. Meanwhile, Basanti cheats on Arun with Ajit, who promises to marry her.

Arun graduated from medical school, but has an accident that blinds him. When he returns to India, Basanti refuses to marry him due to his blindness. Arun stays in the home of his friend Kedar, where he is nursed hy Sagarika, who is pretending to be Basanti.

When a famous doctor agrees to operate on Arun's eyes, Basanti once again wishes to marry Arun. After the successful operation, Sagarika flees and Arun realizes that Basanti is not the woman who nursed him. Kedar calls Sagarika, and Arun and Sagarika are reconciled.

== Cast ==
- Uttam Kumar as Arun
- Suchitra Sen as Sagarika
- Jamuna Sinha as Basanti
- Namita Sinha as Sipra
- Kamal Mitra as Professor of Medical College
- Jahar Ganguly as Basanti's father
- Pahadi Sanyal as Arun's uncle
- Anup Kumar
- Jiben Bose as Kedarda

== Production ==
During the shooting of the film, producer Sukumar Kumar became ill, leading to shooting being stopped due to a lack of money. Kamal Mitra and Pahadi Sanyal shot a portion of the film, but were unable to continue. Uttam Kumar gave director Agradoot 30,000 rupees to continue shooting the film.

== Soundtrack ==
Sagarika

Soundtrack album by Robin Chatterjee
- Released: 1956
- Recorded: 1955
- Studio: S.C Productions
- Genre: Feature Film Soundtrack
- Length: 0:20:49
- Label: National Sound Studio
- Producer: Sukumar Kumar

Robin Chatterjee chronology
Dhake Ki Malmal (1956)	Sagarika (1956)	Saheb Bibi Golam (1956)

Robin Chatterjee composed the songs for the film, with Gouri Prasanna Majumdar, Pranab Roy and Nitai Bhattachariya being songwriters.

Song title
No.	Title	singer(s)	Length
1.	"Amar Shwapne Dekha Rajkonya"	Shyamal Mitra	2:18
2.	"Ei Madhuraat Sudhu Phool Paapiyar"	Sandhya Mukherjee	2:49
3.	"Ankhi Jane Phool Keno Phote"	Sandhya Mukherjee	3:18
4.	"Tobo Bijay Mukut Ajike Dekhi"	Sandhya Mukherjee	2:33
5.	"Hriday Amar Sundar Tabo"	Alpana Banerjee	2:41
6.	"Ei To Amar Prothom Phagun Bela"	Sandhya Mukherjee	3:15
7.	"Swapna Bhora Din Guli Mor Jai Bheshe"	Alpana Banerjee	1:30
8.	"Amra Medical College E Pori"	Sathinath Mukherjee, Utpala Sen, Dwijen Mukherjee	2:25
Total length:			20:49

== Reception ==
The film became an all-time blockbuster and ran for 24 weeks, the highest for any Uttam Suchitra film.

== Remakes ==
The film was remade in Hindi as Prem Patra in 1962, starring Sashi Kapoor and Sadhana. It was also remade in Telugu as Aradhana, starring Akkineni Nageshwara Rao and Savitri.
