= Kar Pape =

- কার পাপে
- Directed by: Kali Prasad Ghosh
- Written by: Kali Prasad Ghosh
- Screenplay by: Kali Prasad Ghosh
- Story by: Kali Prasad Ghosh
- Produced by: M.P. Productions
- Starring: Uttam Kumar; Asit Baran; Chhabi Biswas; Manju Dey
- Cinematography: Bijay Ghosh
- Edited by: Kali Raha
- Music by: Anupam Ghatak
- Production company: Shankar Pictures
- Distributed by: Delux Film Distributors
- Release date: 15 August 1952
- Running time: 84 min
- Country: India
- Language: Bengali

Kar Pape (The Sinner) is a Bengali social drama film written and directed by Kali Prasad Ghosh and produced by M.P. Productions. The film was released on 15 August 1952, under the banner of Shankar Pictures. It is the first time in history that an adult Bengali film raising awareness about sexually transmitted diseases was made. It was one of the early screen appearances of Uttam Kumar before his rise to superstardom.

== Plot ==
Asim, a womanizer, is diagnosed with syphilis by Dr. Bose, who warns him against marriage until he completes treatment. Ignoring the advice, Asim secretly marries Beauty without disclosing the disease. Beauty suffers miscarriages and later infected. When Dr. Bose discovers that Beauty is the wife of his former patient, and Beauty learns that her husband had concealed his disease. Asim refuses the treatment and prepares to remarry. To prevent another woman from suffering, Beauty shoots to kill Asim on his wedding day.

== Cast ==
- Uttam Kumar as Shankar
- Asit Baran as Asim
- Manju Dey as Beauty, Asim's wife
- Chhabi Biswas as Dr. Bose
- Aparna Devi
- Renuka Ray
- Reba Devi
- Jayashree Sen
- Rekha Mitra
