= Nimai Bhattacharya =

Indian writer (1931–2020)

Nimai Bhattacharya নিমাই ভট্টাচার্য
- Born: 10 April 1931; Shalikha, Magura, Bengal Presidency, British India (Bangladesh)
- Died: 25 June 2020 (aged 89); Tollygunge, Kolkata, West Bengal, India
- Notable work: Memsaheb

Nimai Bhattacharya (10 April 1931 – 25 June 2020) was a writer of Bengali literature who was born in Magura's Shalikha. He died on 25 June 2020 in Kolkata, aged 89.

== Early life ==
Bhattacharya's mother died when he was three years old. He matriculated in 1948. He moved to West Bengal from East Bengal. Then he had passed IA and BA from Ripon College, Calcutta. He started his career in journalism. A novel which was written by him was published in Amritobazar in 1963. His next four novels were published in the newspaper. After that, he became professional author.

== Notable works ==
He wrote more than 150 books, one of the most lauded of which was Memsaheb. A film was made based on the book, Mem Saheb (starring Uttam Kumar and Aparna Sen) in leading roles. Some of his notable books are:

- Memsaheb
- Minibus
- Matal
- Inquilab
- Bachelor
- Kerani
- Rajdhani Express
- Anglo Indian
- Darling
- Your Honour
- Cocktail
- Pother Sheshe
