= Jaal Sannyasi =

1977 Bengali film

Jaal Sannyasi is a Bengali drama film directed by Salil Sen based on the novel Muktisnan of Charu Chandra Bandopadhyay. This film was released on 26 August 1977 under the banner of Usha Films. The music director of the movie was Shyamal Mitra.

== Cast ==
- Uttam Kumar
- Kamal Mitra
- Arati Bhattacharya
- Shekhar Chattopadhyay
- Chhaya Debi
- Satya Bandyopadhyay
- Santu Mukhopadhyay
