= Kalankini Kankabati =

- Theatrical poster of Kalankini Kankabati
- Directed by: Pijush Basu; Uttam Kumar
- Screenplay by: Pijush Basu
- Story by: Nihar Ranjan Gupta
- Produced by: Subrata Mukherjee; Sutanu Chattterjee
- Starring: Uttam Kumar; Sharmila Tagore; Mithun Chakraborty; Supriya Devi
- Cinematography: Bijoy Ghosh
- Edited by: Baidyanath Chatterjee; Rabin Sen
- Music by: R. D. Burman
- Production companies: Bina Films; Parna Chitram
- Distributed by: Seema Pictures
- Release date: 7 August 1981
- Running time: 130 minutes
- Country: India
- Language: Bengali

Kalankini Kankabati (Bengali pronunciation: [kɔlɔŋkini kɔŋkaboti] transl. Kankabati is Stigmatized) is a 1981 Indian Bengali-language epic period action drama film directed by Pijush Basu and Uttam Kumar. Produced by Subrata Mukherjee and Sutanu Chatterjee under the banner of Beena Films, the film is based on a novel of the same name by Nihar Ranjan Gupta. It plots the tragedy of a royal family, where the love affairs of each king with courtesans consequent their cursed lives.

The film stars Sharmila Tagore in dual roles as the titular role and her mother, alongside Kumar himself, Mithun Chakraborty and Supriya Devi in lead roles. Principal photography of the film commenced in April 1980 and wrapped by in December 1980. Music of the film is composed by R. D. Burman, with lyrics penned by Swapan Chakraborty. Predominantly shot in Jhargram and Bankura, portions of the filming took places in Kolkata and Mumbai. The cinematography of the film is handled by Bijoy Ghosh, while Baidyanath Chatterjee edited the film.

Basu, who was the only director of the film initially, died in April 1980; later Kumar stepped into the direction, who was only starring in the film that time. In July 1980, Kumar also died during the production, which led his voice from the original footages to keep intact in the film, due to the incompletion of dubbing his portions.

Kalankini Kankabati was primarily planned for release on 12 September 1980, coinciding with Durga Puja. After a languishment in production hell for eleven months, it was theatrically released on 7 August 1981. Opening to highly positive response both critically and commercially, the film emerged as the highest-grossing Bengali film of 1981, and ran for over 26 weeks in theatres.

== Plot ==
Zamindar Raj Shekhar Rai, is a deep patron of music, especially of tawaif. One such dancer is Aparna Bai, for whom he falls in love. However, his wife Sureshwari finds this matter alarming, because in the royal family, every zamindar's love affair with any tawaif has resulted in their cursed lives. To save her son Shashanka Shekhar from this tradition, Sureshwari sends him to Kolkata for higher study.

Meanwhile, Raj Shekhar entrusts all the responsibility of taking care of Aparna to his trusted employee Raghubir. Although Raj Shekhar tries to convince Aparna by giving different facilities, she falls in love with Raghubir eventually. When Raj Shekhar hears about it, he orders Raghubir to get out from his area. All on a sudden, things take a turn for the worse when he desperately escape with Aparna from the palace to avoid Raj Shekhar's shadow. Being aware of it, Raj Shekhar kills Raghubir on his way. Aparna survives from this violent situation and takes shelter in a priest's house. There she gives birth to a daughter. Years later, Raj Shekhar learns of it and kidnaps her daughter forcefully to take revenge on Aparna.

Years pass when Raj Shekhar's son Shekhar returns to his house. One day he notices a girl in their rest house and comes to know her name as Kankabati, the daughter of Aparna. Soon, both of them fall in love with each other, but Shekhar unaware that his mother Sureshwari, had already fixed his marriage with the daughter of Nishchindapur's zamindar. When his wife comes to the palace, Shekhar does not accept her as his wife. On the other hand, Suryakanta, who is the priest's son gives shelter to Aparna and loves Kankabati. Aparna mother decides to give her daughter's hand in marriage to Suryakanta. But all her plans gets thwarted by Raj Shekhar. Suryakanta comes in between the two and told Rajshekhar about Shekhar and Kankabati's love story. Suryakanta goes to Kankabati and informs him of his mother still being alive. So Kankabati agrees to go with Suryakanta. At that moment Shekhar was present there and kills both Suryakanta and Kankabati. Then he surrenders himself to the police. To save his son, Rajshekhar takes the blame of the murder on himself. Rajshekhar goes to jail. Shekhar starts loving Aparna as his own mother and all ended happily.

== Cast ==
- Uttam Kumar as Raj Shekhar Rai / Raja Babu
- Sharmila Tagore in dual roles as
  - Aparna Bai, a tawaif from Allahbad
  - Kankabati, Aparna's daughter and Shashanka's love interest
- Mithun Chakraborty as Shashanka Shekhar Rai, Raj Shekhar's son
- Supriya Devi as Sureshwari, Raj Shekhar's wife
- Soma Chowdhury (credited as Soma) as Swarna, the princess of Nishchindipur and Shashanka's wife
- Samit Bhanja as Suryakanta, Kankabati's fiancé
- Santu Mukherjee as Raghubir, Aparna's love interest
- Asit Baran as Aparna's teacher
- Shambhu Bhattacharya as Murari, Raj Shekhar's manager
- Tarun Mitra as Shashi Shekhar Rai, Raj Shekhar's father
- Lily Chakravarty as Sudhamoyee Devi, Shashi's wife and Raj Shekhar's mother
- Sanghamitra Banerjee as Panna Bai, a tawaif from Agra
- Rabin Banerjee as Raghav, Raj Shekhar's henchman

== Music ==
Kalankini Kankabati

Soundtrack album to Kalankini Kankabati by R. D. Burman
- Released: 1981
- Recorded: 1980
- Genre: Feature Film Soundtrack
- Length: 18:06
- Language: Bengali
- Label: The Megaphone Company
- Producer: R. D. Burman

R. D. Burman chronology
Harjaee (1981)	Kalankini Kankabati (1981)	Jail Yatra (1981)
External audio
- Kalankini Kankabati Audio Jukebox on YouTube

Music of the film is composed by R. D. Burman, in his third Bengali film after Rajkumari (1970) and Anusandhan (1981). It marks his third time collaboration with Kumar after Rajkumari and Kitaab (1977), and second time with Chakraborty after Sitara (1980). The album contains five songs penned by Swapan Chakraborty.

The song "Bedhechi Beena Gaan Shonabo" sung by Parween Sultana, was later retuned by Burman himself into Hindi as "Ae Ri Pawan", sung by Lata Mangeshkar in the film Bemisal (1982).

Track listing
No.	Title	Singer(s)	Length
1.	"Patheri Aanke Banke"	R. D. Burman	4:45
2.	"Na Na Kache Esho Na"	Lata Mangeshkar	4:51
3.	"Bendhechi Beena Gaan Shonabo"	Parween Sultana	5:07
4.	"O Amar Kandher Anchal"	Asha Bhosle	3:36
5.	"Aadho Aalo Chhayate"	Kishore Kumar, Asha Bhosle	4:32
Total length:			22:51
