= Ore Jatri =

- Directed by: Rajen Choudhury
- Starring: Uttam Kumar; Prabha Devi; Anubha Gupta; Dhirendranath Ganguly; Dipak Mukhopadhyay; Nabadwip Halder
- Music by: Kalipada Sen
- Release date: 1 January 1951
- Language: Bengali

Ore Jatri is a Bengali drama film directed by Rajen Choudhury and director of photography Anil Gupta. It was released on 1 January 1951 under the banner of Kalpa Chitramandir production company. The film has Uttam Kumar and Prabha Devi in the lead roles. It was filmed in black and white.

== Cast ==
- Prabha Devi
- Uttam Kumar
- Anubha Gupta
- Dhirendranath Ganguly
- Dipak Mukhopadhyay
- Nabadwip Halder
- Namita Ray
- Nitai Bhattacharya
- Renuka Ray
- Tara Bhaduri
