= Two Men =

Two Men may refer to:

- Two Men (1910 film), an American short film directed by Harry Solter
- Two Men (1922 film), an American Western film directed by Robert North Bradbury
- Two Men in Dallas, a 1976 documentary by Mark Lane
- Two Men (1988 film), a Canadian television film directed by Gordon Pinsent
- Two Men (1996 film), a South Korean film directed by Kwungwo Park starring Choi Jae-sung

== See also ==
- Two and a Half Men, a US sitcom
- Dui Purush (disambiguation), Indian films so titled
