= Atithee =

1978 film

- Directed by: Aravind Sen
- Written by: Prafulla Roy
- Starring: Shashi Kapoor; Shatrughan Sinha; Shabana Azmi
- Music by: Kalyanji-Anandji
- Release date: 27 July 1978
- Running time: 2h 15m
- Country: India
- Language: Hindi

Atithee is a 1978 Bollywood romantic drama film directed and produced by Aravind Sen. The film stars Shashi Kapoor, and Shatrughan Sinha. The movie was based on the 1971 Bengali movie Ekhane Pinjar.

== Cast ==
- Shashi Kapoor as Anand
- Shatrughan Sinha as Navendu Kumar
- Shabana Azmi as Leela/Julie
- Vidya Sinha as Meena/Martha
- Utpal Dutt as Avinash Gupta
- Mac Mohan as Abdullah
- Deven Verma as Station Master
- Bharat Bhushan as Mohan Kumar
- Urmila Bhatt as Mrs. Mohan Kumar
- Gayatri as Rajni
- Mehmood Jr. as Kundan Kumar
- Viju Khote as Train passenger

== Soundtrack ==
Lyrics: Verma Malik

| Song | Singer |
|---|---|
| Kya Karoon Mujhko Time Nahin | Kishore Kumar |
| Rang Birange Nazare Humko Pukare | Kishore Kumar, Anuradha Paudwal |
| Gaa Ke Jiyo To Geet Hai Ye Zindagi | Kishore Kumar, Anuradha Paudwal, Kanchan |
| Tu Hi Hai Hey Prabhu, Teri Bhakti Teri Shakti | Asha Bhosle, Usha Timothy, Kanchan |
| Sabar Ka Phal Meetha | Manna Dey |
