= Maraner Pare =

1954 film

- Directed by: Satish Dasgupta
- Written by: Gajendra Kumar Mitra
- Screenplay by: Anil Dutta
- Story by: Ajit Bandopadhyay (Dialogues also)
- Starring: Suchitra Sen; Uttam Kumar; Sambhu Mitra; Ajit Banerjee
- Cinematography: Subodh Bandopadhyay
- Edited by: Nirmmalananda Mukhopadhyay
- Music by: Sargam Unit, Lyricist – Mohini Chowdhury
- Production company: Himalayan Art Producers
- Distributed by: Anjan Films
- Release date: 1 January 1954
- Running time: 132 minutes
- Country: India
- Language: Bengali

Maraner Pare was a Bengali crime drama film directed by Satish Dasgupta. This movie was released on 1 Jan 1954 under the banner of Himalayan Art Producers. The music direction was done by Sargam Unit. This movie stars Uttam Kumar, Suchitra Sen, Sambhu Mitra, Ajit Bandyopadhyay and Dhiraj Bhattacharya in the lead roles. The film became a superhit at the box office and ran for 91 days in the theaters. This was the second big hit of Uttam-Suchitra pair after Sharey Chuattor in 1953.

== Plot ==
Rai Bahadur Bhujanga Choudhury marries Smritikana many years after the death of her first wife. Often she gets visions, forgets her identity and becomes very agitated, and ultimately faints. In particular, Bhujanga or his picture seem to trigger this strange behaviour in the extreme, even leading her to violence.

Tanima (Suchitra Sen) is the daughter of Bhujanga from his first marriage. Tanima takes his stepmother Smritikana to a mental hospital for treatment. There Tanima falls in love with the Doctor Ashok (Uttamkumar) who is entrusted by the hospital director Dr. Chowdhury (who had looked after Ashok since his childhood) with treating Smritikana. When she sees Dr. Ashok first time, Smritikana behaves in a weird way, again forgetting herself and addressing Ashok as her son.

Dr. Chowdhury suspects Smritikana to be suffering not from mental illness but occasional past life recollection. He asks Ashok to accommodate Smritikana in his quarters to explore that line further.

Although in love with Tanima, Ashok refuses to marry her because he himself is an orphan and doesn't know his parents. One day while Dr. Ashok is talking to his senior Dr. Chowdhury and Tanima, suddenly they hear some people chasing a thief. But Ashok takes pity on the thief and brings him home to give him some food. When the thief appears, Smritikana sees him and instantly recognizes him as "her" brother Gurudas.

Then the story from her previous birth unfolds. in her previous life she was Sati, Gurudas' sister and Bhujanga's first wife. Bhujanga, whose original name was Ahindra, and Gurudas had conspired to swindle and ultimately ruin a wealthy doctor and his wife Tapati. They succeeded by implicating the doctor in a false case of murdering Gurudas, who was actually merely playacting to be dead, and pretending to help him escape from the police by sheltering him secretly. However, they played mind games upon him and drove him to suicide. Sati, who had befriended Tapati and the two betrothed their children to each other, revealed these facts to her.

Tapati, in trying to run away from the murderous Ahindra with the help of a domestic maid, died from an accident. Their son Ashok survived. Ahindra then murdered Sati and falsely blamed Gurudas for it. Gurudas had to spend many years in the prison.

Dr. Chowdhury wishes Ashok and Tanima to marry each other and tries to convince Smritikana to accept Ashok as her stepson-in-law by producing a locket carrying the name Sati and that triggers Smritikana's complete recollection of the events of her past life as Sati.

Suddenly Bhujanga enters the scene. Gurudas recognizes him to be Ahindra and takes his revenge by killing him. The movie ends with Smritikana devi uniting the lovers Ashok and Tanima.

== Cast ==
- Suchitra Sen – Tanima
- Uttam Kumar – Dr. Ashok
- Pranoti Ghosh – Smritikana
- Ajit Bandyopadhyay – Dr. Paresh Banerjee
- Dhiraj Bhattacharya – Ahindra alias Rai Bahadur Bhujanga Choudhury
- Biren Chattapadhyay – Dr Ghosh, Chief Doctor
- Panchanan Bhattacharya
- Nilima Das – Bijli Bai
- Bharati Devi – Tapati
- Sambhu Mitra – Gurudas
- Joy Narayan Mukherjee

== Soundtrack ==
Music of the film composed by Sargam Unit and lyrics was written by Mohini Chowdhury.
