= Sonar Khancha =

- Directed by: Agradoot
- Screenplay by: Mihir Sen
- Story by: Bireswar Sarkar
- Produced by: Sarkar Films
- Starring: Uttam Kumar; Aparna Sen; Tarun Kumar Chatterjee
- Music by: Bireswar Sarkar
- Release date: 1973
- Country: India
- Language: Bengali

Sonar Khancha (transl. Golden Cage) is a 1973 Bengali-language masala film that was directed by Agradoot Music of the film was composed by Bireshwar Sarkar. Uttam Kumar, Aparna Sen and Tarun Kumar played the lead roles.

== Cast ==
- Haradhan Banerjee
- Subrata Chatterjee
- Sulata Chowdhury
- Aparna Sen
- Uttam Kumar
- Tarun Kumar Chatterjee

== Soundtrack ==
All music is composed by Bireswar Sarkar.

song title
| No. | Title | singer(s) | Length |
|---|---|---|---|
| 1. | "Ja Ja Ja Bhule Jaa" | Lata Mangeshkar | 3:26 |
| 2. | "Shudhu Bhalobasha Diye" | Hemanta Mukherjee | 3:28 |
| 3. | "Brishti Brishti Brishti" | Lata Mangeshkar | 2:47 |
| 4. | "Ore Amar Mon" | Dwijen Mukherjee | 3:23 |
| 5. | "Jare Ja Ure Rajar Kumar (part 2)" | Hemanta Mukherjee | 2:51 |
| 6. | "Ke Jaane Ko Ghonta" | Hemanta Mukherjee | 2:42 |
| 7. | "life is a game" | Karabi Nath | 3:02 |
| 8. | "Jare Ja Ure Rajar Kumar (part 1)" | Meena Mukherjee | 2:58 |
