= Chowringhee (novel) =

1962 novel

- The cover of Chowringhee published by Penguin books
- Author: Sankar
- Original title: চৌরঙ্গী
- Translator: Arunava Sinha
- Language: Bengali
- Genre: Fiction
- Publisher: Dey's Publishing in Bengali, Penguin books and Atlantic Books in English
- Publication date: 1962
- English publication date: 2007
- Pages: 360 in Bengali (Dey's Publishing 1994 edition), 403 (Penguin 2007 edition) and 416 (Atlantic 2009 edition) in English
- ISBN: 978-1-84354-914-7
- OCLC: 551425289

Chowringhee is a novel by Bengali author Sankar. First published in Bengali in 1962, the novel became a bestseller and was translated into a number of Indian languages and made into a film and a play.

It is considered arguably Sankar's most popular book, a classic novel in Bengali. The novel, translated into English by Arunava Sinha, won the Vodafone Crossword Book Award 2007 for the best translation. The novel was shortlisted for Independent Foreign Fiction Prize in 2010. This book was inspired by real incidents.

== Plot summary ==
Sankar named his novel Chowringhee as the novel is set in Chowringhee, a neighborhood in Calcutta, in the mid-1950s. The narrator, Shankar, an ambitious young man who was previously a secretary of an English barrister becomes unemployed as the Barrister dies all of a sudden and he is forced to sell wastepaper baskets door to door. Once, as he takes rest in a neighborhood park, reminiscing about his past and fearful of what awaits him in future, Byron, a friend of his passes by and is shocked by Shankar's descent into poverty. He finds Shankar a job at the Shahjahan Hotel, one of the city's oldest and most venerable hotels.

Shankar is soon befriended by Sata Bose, the hotel's chief receptionist, and after a brief stint as a typist, Shankar becomes Bose's main assistant and close confidant. The manager Marco Polo who is feared by all likes him as well, and the young Shankar is given more responsibilities. The story of the novel spins around the guests, entertainers, and frequent visitors of the Shahjahan, but several members of the hotel staff get equal importance in Shankar's narrative. We learn about the seamy underside of the elite of Calcutta, whose greed, shady deals, and shameful behaviors are initially shocking to our naïve young man, who soon becomes jaded and disgusted by them. The poverty of working and jobless Calcuttans is vividly portrayed, as those not in the upper echelon are only one stroke of bad luck away from living in the streets or in dilapidated hovels. Love is a central theme, amongst the guests and workers, with often tragic results.

== Themes and legacy ==
Chowringhee explores daily life in Calcutta and the differences between the poor and the rich. The setting of a busy hotel demonstrates how people working at the hotel deal with loss, ambition, and hope in a changing city. Guests coming into the hotel ranging from wealthy to struggling workers shows how everyone has their own struggles. This story connects to the reader because of how relatable the characters are.

== Awards ==
The English translation of Chowringhee won the Vodafone Crossword Book Award in 2007 for best translation by Arunava Sinha. It was also shortlisted for the 2010 Independent Foreign Fiction Prize.

== Adaptation ==
A film named Chowringhee was released in 1968 under the direction of Pinaki Bhushan Mukherjee. The film stars Uttam Kumar, Anjana Bhowmik and Subhendu Chatterjee in lead roles.
