= Shambhu Bhattacharya =

Bengali actor and stage artist (1935–2018)

Shambhu Bhattacharya (1935 – 26 January 2018) was a Bengali actor and stage artist.

== Career ==
Bhattacharya started his acting career in theatre in Kolkata. He worked in several stage productions of Utpal Dutt, Jahor Roy and Rabi Ghosh. He was a bodybuilder from Baghbazar Bayam Samity. Bhattacharya became popular mainly for his antagonistic role in Bengali films. His performance in Sagina Mahato, Agnishwar, Sanyasi Raja, Amanush, Marjina Abdulla and Charmurti were remembered by film critics. He died in a private nursing home on 26 January 2018 in Kolkata.

== Partial filmography ==
- Mej Didi
- Patalghar
- Neoti
- Choudhury Paribar
- Jiban Sandhan
- Laha Pranam
- Kumari Maa
- Mejo Bou
- Iswar Parameswar
- Tomar Rakte Amar Sohag
- Pennam Calcutta
- Goopy Bagha Phire Elo
- Pati Param Guru
- Beder Meye Josna
- Joar Bhata
- Debata
- Mahapith Tarapith
- Sreemati Hansaraj
- Aparanher Alo
- Agun
- Amar Kantak
- Shatru
- Rajeswari
- Madhuban
- Abhinay Noy
- Swarna Mahal
- Kalankini Kankabati
- Nyaya Anyay
- Saheb
- Baisakhi Megh
- Ekhoni
- Subarna Golak
- Manikchand
- Bancharamer Bagan
- Charmurti
- Sabyasachi
- Lal Kuthi
- Dhanraj Tamang
- Dui Purush
- Mantramugdha
- Sister
- Nidhiram Sardar
- Agnishwar
- Sanyasi Raja
- Dhanni Meye
- Umno O Jhumno
- Amanush
- Marjina Abdulla
- Natun Diner Alo
- Sagina Mahato
- Pratibad
- Gar Nasimpur
- Abhishapta Chambal
- Dakather Hatey Bulu
