= Deya Neya =

- Theatrical release poster
- Directed by: Sunil Bannerjee
- Written by: Bidhayak Bhattacharya
- Screenplay by: Bidhayak Bhattachariya
- Produced by: Shyamal Mitra
- Starring: Uttam Kumar; Tanuja; Lily Chakravarty; Tarun Kumar; Chhaya Devi; Kamal Mitra; Nripati Chattopadhyay
- Cinematography: Kanai Dey
- Edited by: Ardhendu Chatterjee, Rashbehari Singha
- Music by: Shyamal Mitra
- Production company: Rupchaya Chitra
- Distributed by: Chayaloke Private Limited
- Release date: 1963
- Running time: 142 minutes
- Country: India
- Language: Bengali

Deya Neya (English: The Exchange, released 1963) is a Bengali-language musical drama film directed by Sunil Bandopadhyay and starring Uttam Kumar and Tanuja in lead roles. This is a romantic comedy film which portrays a man's struggle on a light note and ends with a happy ending. The film was produced and composed by Shyamal Mitra. The film was also loosely inspired by Shymal Mitra's real life. The film is noted for its outstanding music and generally the film became an all-time blockbuster hit.

== Plot ==
Prasanta Kumar Roy (Uttam Kumar), son of BK Roy (Kamal Mitra) - an industrialist from the town of Lucknow, loves music and dislikes family business. His negligence towards work results in loss for the company. His enraged father comes home only to learn that his son is also secretly practicing music. He disapproves the idea. Prasanta leaves home in a bout and settles in one of his old bosom friend Asim's (Tarun Kumar) house in Calcutta (Kolkata). He starts singing there in radio and earns fame under the pseudonym of Abhijit Chowdhury. One day he suddenly comes across an anxious driver searching for a mechanic. He accompanies him to repair the car of a rich guy, Amrita Lal Majumder (Pahari Sanyal) where he meets Sucharita (Tanuja), niece of Amritalal, and falls in love with her. He decides to appoint himself as a mechanic cum driver for Amrita Lal Majumdar, who lives with his niece, and assumes the name Hridoy Haran (stealer of heart). Suchi is a smart girl but difficult to manage. Suchi also happens to be a great fan of singer Abhijit. She tries in various ways to meet Abhijit or to obtain a photograph of him, but singer Abhijit never gives any interview nor allows public display of photograph. Obtaining Asim's address from radio station as the sole contact address to Abhijit, Suchi visits them and gets friendly. She asks them to obtain a photo of Abhijit for her. In one such visits, she almost caught Prasanta on the spot. When Prasanta learns that Suchi is in love for Abhijit he decides to leave the service.

Meanwhile, Mr BK Roy engages police to find his son as his mother (Chhaya Devi) falls ill while grieving for her son. Meanwhile, Sukanta (Premangshu Bose), a close friend and talented lyricist suffers from tuberculosis and has to be operated immediately. Prasanta decides to appear publicly in a show to fundraise the cost of treatment. Meanwhile, Roy and his wife arrive in Calcutta looking for their son. A police person recognizes Prasanta and asks Roy to be in the theater hall. In the meantime, Suchi buys 1st row tickets to watch singer Abhijit live for first time. As the curtain unfolds, Suchi gets astonished as she recognizes the man on stage to be their mysteriously disappeared driver Hridoy Haran, and she feels humiliated while bursting into tears. Mr Roy watches public reactions to his son's song and decides to change his mind. Police asks Prasanta to meet his parents. Before leaving Prasanta asks Asim to explain everything and apologizes to Suchi on behalf of Prasanta. Strangely the police car stops at the house of Mr Amritlal Majumder - where he worked previously. It turns out that BK Roy and Amrit Lal are known to each other for a long time and in fact Roy family are staying there as guests.

Asim explained everything to Suchi, and Asim's wife (Lily Chakravarty) proposes Suchi as bride for Prasanta to Mrs. Roy. But Amritlal rejects the proposal saying Prasanta is a driver and moreover his own driver. It turns out that he was joking and admits that he has no objection with the marriage, but only on one condition, that if Prasanta agrees to be a life time driver for Suchi.

== Cast ==
- Uttam Kumar as Prasanta Kumar Roy / Abhijit Chowdhury / Hridoy Haran
- Tanuja as Sucharita Majumdar
- Pahari Sanyal as Amritalal Majumdar
- Kamal Mitra as BK Roy
- Chhaya Devi as Prasanta's mother
- Tarun Kumar as Asim Chatterjee
- Lily Chakravarty as Asim's wife
- Sumita Sanyal as Bishakha, Sucharita's friend
- Nripati Chattopadhyay
- Shyam Laha as Anumaan, Driver of Amritalal
- Premangshu Bose as Sukanta, Prasanta's friend

== Production ==
The film score was written by its producer Shymal Mitra. For the lead actress role he wanted to cast Nutan at first. But she couldn't give date for Hindi films. Then Mitra selected Nutan's younger sister Tanuja who made her debut in Bengali Cinema. In that time the relationship between Uttam Kumar and Hemanta was bad so Shyamal Mitra took the chance to sing on Uttam leap.

== Soundtrack ==
Deya Neya

Soundtrack album by Shyamal Mitra
- Released: 1963
- Recorded: 1963
- Studio: Rupchaya Chitra
- Genre: Feature film soundtrack
- Length: 0:19:58
- Label: Angel Digital Pvt Ltd
- Producer: Rupchaya Chitra

Shyamal Mitra chronology
Bhranti Bilash (1963)	Deya Neya (1963)	Saptarshi (1964)

All the songs of the film became evergreen hits and remain popular to this day. They were one of the reasons of the success of the film.

All lyrics are written by Gauriprasanna Mazumder; all music is composed by Shyamal Mitra.

Songs
No.	Title	Playback	Length
1.	"Ami Cheye Cheye Dekhi Saradin"	Shyamal Mitra	3:15
2.	"Dole Dodul Dole Jhulana"	Shyamal Mitra, Manabendra Mukherjee	3:09
3.	"Gaane Bhuban Bhoriye Debe"	Shyamal Mitra	3:28
4.	"Jiban-Khatar Prati Patay"	Shyamal Mitra	3:18
5.	"Madhobi Modhupey Holo Mitali"	Aarti Mukherji	3:23
6.	"E Gaane Prajapati"	Sandhya Mukherjee	3:25
Total length:			19:58

== Reception ==
The film became a huge success at the box office for its music. Every song became popular and this was a breakthrough film for Shyamal Mitra who also was the playback singer for Uttam Kumar. The pair become popular after this film. After this Shyamal Mitra regularly sang on Uttam for the rest of his career. The film ran in full houses almost 10 weeks and overall 100 days.

It was the inauguration movie in 29th Kolkata International Film Festival, 2023.

== Remakes ==
In 1969 director Nazrul Islam remade this film as Shorolipi, in Dhaliwood starring Abdur Razzak and Bobita.

In 1977 director producer Shakti Samanta remade this film as Anurodh, starring Rajesh Khanna, Simple Kapadia, Vinod Mehra, and Ashok Kumar.
