= Andha Atit =

1972 Bengali action thriller film by Hiren Nag

- Theatrical poster of Andha Atit
- Directed by: Hiren Nag
- Written by: Hiren Nag
- Screenplay by: Hiren Nag
- Produced by: Asim Sarkar
- Starring: Uttam Kumar; Supriya Devi; Kali Banerjee; Swarup Dutta; Tarun Kumar
- Cinematography: Kanai Dey
- Edited by: Baidyanath Chatterjee
- Music by: Shyamal Mitra
- Production company: Usha Films
- Distributed by: Chandimata Films Pvt Ltd.
- Release date: 7 July 1972
- Country: India
- Language: Bengali

Andha Atit (transl. Blind Past) is a 1972 Indian Bengali-language crime action film written and directed by Hiren Nag. The film was produced by Asim Sarkar under the banner of Usha Films, starring Uttam Kumar and Supriya Devi in lead roles.

== Plot ==
Rakhal Das is a poor employee of the Postal department who is in severe need of money for the treatment of his only son. As a last resort, Rakhal takes the mail bag and drops it from a running train so that he can get it later. At the same time, a municipal van drops all the garbage there. He cannot find the bag or money so he goes to a moneylender named Dhananjay Saha but he finds him dead and the police arrest him for the case of murder and theft. Years later, an excavation is going on and the said mail bag is found. A mystery begins from an old letter which was recovered from the garbage.

== Cast ==
- Uttam Kumar
- Supriya Devi
- Kali Banerjee as Rakhal Das
- Swarup Dutta as Rakhal's son
- Gita Dey as Rakhal's wife
- Tarun Kumar
- Bankim Ghosh as Balaram
- Khagesh Chakraborty
- Biren Chatterjee
- Basudeb Pal

== Soundtrack ==
All lyrics are written by Gauriprasanna Mazumdar; all music is composed by Shyamal Mitra.

No.	Title	Singer	Length
1.	"Aaha Neel Neel Taragulo"	Shyamal Mitra, Aarti Mukherjee	3:28
2.	"Mon-Mayur Pakha Melechhe Aaj"	Aarti Mukherjee	3:28
Total length:			6:56
