= Tarun Kumar (Bengali actor) =

Indian Bengali actor (1931–2003)

Tarun Kumar Chatterjee
- Born: 24 February 1931; Calcutta, Bengal Presidency, British India
- Died: 27 October 2003 (aged 72); Kolkata, West Bengal, India
- Occupation: Actor
- Spouse: Subrata Chatterjee (m. 1962)
- Children: Manami Banerjee/(Jhimli Banerjee) (née Chatterjee)
- Parents: Satkari Chatterjee (father); Chapala Debi (mother)
- Relatives: Uttam Kumar (brother); Barun Chatterjee (brother) Sourav Banerjee (grandchild), Twarita Chatterjee (granddaughter in law), Suravita Ghosh (granddaughter), Indranil Ghosh ( grandson-in-law) Panna Lal Banerjee (son in law)

Tarun Kumar Chatterjee (24 February 1931 – 27 October 2003) was an Indian actor who is known for his exclusive work in Bengali cinema. In most of his films, his role as a supporting actor gave him huge appreciation from critics and audience.

== Personal life ==
Tarun Kumar was born on 24 February 1931 in Kolkata. He was the youngest brother of actor Uttam Kumar. Tarun Kumar passed his Matriculation from South Suburban School. Although he joined Ashutosh College, he could not continue his studies. In his professional life, he used to work in Maclyod Company, Metro Cinema and then at Burn Company for few days. In 1962, he married fellow actress Subrata Chattopadhyay (18 July 1940 - 25 February 2004) and had a daughter. Tarun Kumar was also known by his nickname 'Buro' among film industry people. His grandson Sourav Banerjee is also an actor.

== Career ==
Tarun Kumar acted in over 500 films since making his debut with Hrod in 1954. In Jhinder Bandi, he played the rival, Udit, the brother of Shankar played by Uttam Kumar. In Se Chupi Chupi Aase and Sonar Harin, he played the antagonist. However, in most Uttam Kumar starred films, he either played the role of a friend in Saptapadi, Chhadmabesi, Jeeban Mrityu, Deya Neya to name a few or that of an associate or well-wisher in films like Raja Saja, Dhanyi Meye, Mon Niye, Sanyasi Raja, Kayahiner Kahini and Brajabuli. Tarun Kumar's acting skill may well be underrated by the tall shadow of his elder brother, Uttam Kumar but probably he was one of the finest character actors ever worked in Bengali film industry, who performed with equal ease in all types of roles irrespective of comic (e.g. Haat Baralei Bandhu, Basanta Bilaap, Mouchak and Personal Assistant), negative (e.g. Joradighir Choudhuri Paribaar, Dui Purush and Kalankita Nayak) and intense (e.g. Sonar Khancha and Stree etc.) characters, including cameo (e.g. Sesh Anka and Rajkanya). He received the President's award for his performance in the film Dadathakur in 1966. Apart from films he acted on quite a few professional theatres. His play Nahabat, in which he had one of the main roles, ran for about seven years.

== Other works ==
He was chiefly instrumental in establishing the Uttam Mancha, an auditorium in South Kolkata, named after his elder brother. Presently, this hall is under the supervision of the Kolkata Municipal Corporation.

== Death ==
Tarun Kumar died on 27 October 2003 at the age of 72.

== Selected filmography ==
- Punarmilan
- Dadathakur
- Saptapadi
- Chupi Chupi Aashey
- Sonar Harin
- Haat Baralei Bandhu
- Jhinder Bandi
- Kuhak
- Raja Saja
- Deya Neya
- Sesh Anka
- Paka Dekha
- Personal Assistant
- Hrad
- Dui Bhai
- Bhrantibilas
- Rajkanya
- Kaal Tumi Aaleya
- Jiban Mrityu
- Ashite Ashiona
- Mon Niye
- Kalankita Nayak
- Chhadmabesi
- Chowranghee
- Joradighir Choudhuri Paribaar
- Dhanyi Meye
- Rajkumari
- Jay Jayanti
- Basanta Bilap
- Dui Purush
- Stree
- Sonar Khancha
- Mouchak
- Sanyasi Raja
- Kayahiner Kahini
- Phuleswari
- Chameli Memsaheb
- Striker
- Brajabuli
- Binimoi
- Bahnisikha
- Sonay Sohaga
- Behula Lakhindar
- Pampa
- Tasher Ghar
- Abak Prithibi
- Sathi Hara
- Surya Sikha
- Shudhu Ekti Bachhar
- Kal Tumi Aleya
- Chhoti Si Mulaqat
- Antony Firingee
- Kamallata
- Chhadmabeshi
- Roudra Chhaya
- Chander Kachhakaachhi
- Shesh Anka
- Agnishwar
- Andha Atit
- Aparichito
- Asadharan
- Anandamela
- Ami Se O Sakha
- Alor Thikana
- Indrani
- Ekhane Pinjar
- Garh Nasimpur
- Jiban Trishna
- Dhanraj Tamang
- Natun Tirtha
- Nidhiram Sardar
- Prithibi Amare Chay
- Banhisikha
- Bagh Bondi Khela
- Kancher Swarga
