= Dui Purush (1978 film) =

1978 film

- Directed by: Sushil Mukhopadhyay
- Screenplay by: Bikash Roy
- Story by: Tarashankar Bandopadhyay
- Produced by: Satish Mukherjee; Sunil Ram
- Starring: Uttam Kumar; Dilip Roy; Supriya Choudhury; Tarun Kumar; Bikash Roy; Lily Chakravarty; Satya Bandyopadhyay; Kalyani Mondal; Partha Mukhopadhyay; Nandini Maliya
- Cinematography: Shanti Dutta
- Edited by: Kamal Gangopadhyay
- Music by: Kalipada Sen
- Distributed by: Shadow Productions
- Release date: 24 December 1978
- Country: India
- Language: Bengali

Dui Purush is a 1978 Bengali action drama film directed by Sushil Mukhopadhyay. The film's music was composed by Kalipada Sen.

== Plot ==
Nutubihari Mukherjee is a freedom fighter who makes many sacrifices when he goes to jail and continues to do good even after his release. However, he turns into a corrupt politician when he gets powerful.

== Cast ==
- Uttam Kumar
- Dilip Roy
- Supriya Choudhury
- Tarun Kumar
- Bikash Roy
- Lily Chakravarty
- Satya Bandyopadhyay
- Kalyani Mondal
