= Dhanraj Tamang =

1978 Indian Bengali action film by Pijush Basu

- Directed by: Pijush Basu
- Screenplay by: Pijush Basu
- Dialogues by: Pijush Basu
- Story by: Charuchandra Chakraborty
- Produced by: Asim Sarkar
- Starring: Uttam Kumar; Sandhya Roy; Utpal Dutt; Anil Chatterjee; Dilip Roy
- Cinematography: Ganesh Ghosh
- Edited by: Baidyanath Chatterjee
- Music by: Shyamal Mitra
- Production company: Usha Films
- Distributed by: Chandimata Films Pvt. Ltd.
- Release date: 29 September 1978
- Running time: 110 Minutes
- Country: India
- Language: Bengali

Dhanraj Tamang is a 1978 Indian Bengali-language action film co-written and directed by Pijush Basu. Produced by Asim Sarkar under the banner of Usha Films, the film is based on a story by Charuchandra Chakraborty. It stars Uttam Kumar in the titular role, alongside Sandha Roy, Utpal Dutt, Anil Chatterjee, Dilip Roy and Chhaya Devi in lead roles. Plotted in Simtang tea estate, a faithful worker Dhanraj Tamang, who gets prisoned for discovering the predation of local girls including his wife by his boss, escapes from the jail to take revenge and ultimately goes mad.

Predominantly shot in Darjeeling, Jalpaiguri and Alipurduar with a sporadic schedule, the film marks the eleventh collaboration between Basu and Kumar, and also the debut of Prosenjit Chatterjee as the assistant director. Music of the film is composed by Shyamal Mitra, with lyrics penned by Gauriprasanna Mazumder. Ganesh Ghosh handled its cinematography, while Baidyanath Chatterjee edited the film.

Dhanraj Tamang theatrically released on 29 September 1978, coinciding with Durga Puja. Opening to positive reviews, the film was a blockbuster at the box office and after a number of commercially unsuccessful films, it redefined Kumar's stardom with a long run consisting of 210 days in theatres. The song "Ekti Sudhu Naam Dhanraj Tamang", sung by Hemanta Mukherjee, became very popular among the masses, upon its release. At the 16th Filmfare Awards East, it received the Best Actor award for Kumar.

== Plot ==
In a tea estate close to Darjeeling, Dhanraj Tamang is a well-liked and trustworthy worker. He is always willing to assist and encourage locals. He defends women from sexual predators but is unable to save his own wife. His tea estate boss allegedly sexually assaults his wife, leading to the sentencing of the man to prison. Dhanraj comes back to exact revenge.

== Cast ==
- Uttam Kumar as Dhanraj Tamang, the leader of the workers of Simtang tea estate
- Sandhya Roy as Phoolmaya, Dhanraj's wife
- Utpal Dutt as Mr. Mackengy, the assistant manager of Simtang tea estate
- Anil Chatterjee as Dr. Nibaran Majumder
- Dilip Roy as Moloy Chakraborty, the Deputy Jailer
- Chhaya Devi as Burima
- Tarun Kumar as Ghosh Da, owner of local wine shop
- Shambhu Bhattacharya as Naga, a local goon
- Tarun Mitra as Kishan Thapa

== Soundtrack ==
Dhanraj Tamang

Soundtrack album by Shyamal Mitra
- Released: 1978
- Recorded: 1977
- Studio: Usha Films
- Genre: Feature film soundtrack
- Length: 17:18
- Label: Angel Digital Pvt Ltd
- Producer: Ashim Sarkar

Shyamal Mitra chronology
Nishan (1978)	Dhanraj Tamang (1978)	Priyatama (1980)

Music of the film is composed by Shyamal Mitra, in his third collaboration with Pijush Basu after Jiban Jigyasha (1971) and Rajbangsha (1977). The album contains five songs, all of which are penned by Gauriprasanna Mazumder in his sixth collaboration with Basu after Swarna Shikhar Pranganey (1970), Jiban Jigyasha (1971), Sanyasi Raja (1975), Banhishikha (1976) and Rajbangsha (1977).

Track listing
No.	Title	Singer(s)	Length
1.	"Ekti Sudhu Naam Dhanraj Tamang"	Hemanta Mukherjee	2:53
2.	"Dekho Chuti Peye"	Shyamal Mitra	4:01
3.	"Mon Holo Aaj"	Aarti Mukherjee	2:41
4.	"Tipai Tipai"	Aarti Mukherjee	3:44
5.	"Tora To Sobai Chili"	Chhaya Devi, Shakti Thakur	3:59
Total length:			17:18

== Award ==
Filmfare East Awards

- 1979: Filmfare East Awards - Best Actor - Uttam Kumar.

== Shelved remake ==
M. G. Ramachandran, initially wanted to remake it in Tamil starring himself in lead, but got shelved. Later K. Raghavendra Rao showed his interest to remake it in both Hindi and Telugu language starring Amitabh Bachchan and N. T. Rama Rao in the titular role respectively, but due to rights issues, it also couldn't come to the board.
