= Kuhak (film) =

1960 film by Agradoot

- Directed by: Agradoot
- Based on: Kuhak (novel) by Samaresh Basu
- Screenplay by: Samaresh Basu; Agradoot
- Dialogues by: Samaresh Basu
- Produced by: Subimal Dey
- Starring: Uttam Kumar; Sabitri Chatterjee; Tarun Kumar; Rina Ghosh
- Cinematography: Bibhuti Laha; Bijoy Ghosh
- Edited by: Baidyanath Chatterjee
- Music by: Hemanta Mukherjee
- Production company: M. P. Productions
- Distributed by: Narayan Pictures Pvt. Ltd.
- Release date: 2 April 1960
- Country: India
- Language: Bengali

Kuhak is a 1960 Bengali-language action thriller film directed by Agradoot and starring Uttam Kumar and Sabitri Chatterjee in lead roles. This film portrays a man's struggle to run blindly after riches.

== Cast ==
- Uttam Kumar as Sunando Chowdhury (Thief)
- Sabitri Chatterjee as Swarnalata (Ganesh's Sister)
- Tulsi Chakraborty as Adhikary
- Kamal Mitra as BK Roy
- Tarun Kumar as Ganesh (Thief)
- Gangapada Bose as Ananto Khuro
- Premanghsu Bose as Gokul
- Preeti Majumdar
- Master Dipak as Hiru
- Master Sushanta as Chhoton

== Soundtrack ==
All songs were composed and sung by Hemanta Mukherjee and penned by Gauriprasanna Majumdar.

- "Aro Kache Eso" - Hemanta Mukherjee
- "Bishnupriya Go Ami Chole Jai" - Hemanta Mukherjee
- "Hay Hanpay Je Ei Hapor" - Hemanta Mukherjee
- "Naolo Kishori Go" - Hemanta Mukherjee
- 'Peyechhi Parash Manik" - Hemanta Mukherjee
- "Sarati Din Dhore" - Hemanta Mukherjee
