= Stree (1972 film) =

1972 Indian Bengali-language film

- Directed by: Salil Dutta
- Screenplay by: Salil Dutta
- Story by: Bimal Mitra
- Based on: Stree by Bimal Mitra
- Produced by: Pradyot Kumar Basu
- Starring: Uttam Kumar; Soumitra Chatterjee; Arati Bhattacharya
- Cinematography: Bijoy Ghosh
- Edited by: Amiyo Mukhopadhyay
- Music by: Nachiketa Ghosh
- Production company: Baby June Production
- Distributed by: S. B. Films
- Release date: 18 August 1972
- Running time: 141 minutes
- Country: India
- Language: Bengali

Stree is a 1972 Indian Bengali-language period action drama film directed by Salil Dutta. The film is based on the novel of Bimal Mitra by the same title and the era of the plot showing during the Second World War. Produced by Baby June Productions, it stars Uttam Kumar, Soumitra Chatterjee and Arati Bhattacharya in lead roles. The soundtrack of the film was composed by Nachiketa Ghosh, with the lyrics penned by Gauriprasanna Mazumder and Pulak Bandyopadhyay.

The film showed Kumar's performance and clash with Chatterjee. The film was nominated at the BFJA Award 1973 and won seven awards. It was later remade in Hindi in 1982 as Ayaash starring Sanjeev Kumar, Arun Govil and Rati Agnihotri in lead roles.

== Plot ==
Sitapati, a homeless youth, arrives at the estate of landlord Madhav Dutta and secures a job as his cameraman. He discovers that his former girlfriend, Mrinmoyee, is now Madhav's wife. Madhav's polygamy and Mirnmoyee's loneliness prompt her to enter into an extramarital relationship with Sitapati. From traditional dances and rampant alcoholism to love, betrayal, and hatred—Sitapati's lens captures it all. Finally, Sitapati leaves the house, Mrinmoyee dies, and gradually Madhav learns about their relationship. Madhav cannot bear the fact that his wife has committed adultery. He goes to take revenge and shoots Sitapati who is already dead, then becomes mad and shoots himself.

== Cast ==
- Uttam Kumar as Madhab Dutta, a landlord
- Soumitra Chatterjee as Sitapati, a cameraman
- Arati Bhattacharya as Mrinmoyee / Meenu, Madhab's wife and Sitapati's ex-girlfriend
- Bhanu Banerjee as Sansar Chatterjee
- Jahor Roy as Gobardhan Sarkar
- Tarun Kumar as Balaram / Bolu, Sitapati's brother-in-law
- Subrata Chattopadhyay as Aruna, Sitapati's sister
- Sulata Chowdhury as Sarala, Meenu's maid-servant
- Shankar Ghosh as Brindaban, Madhab's son
  - Arindam Ganguly as child Brindaban
- Mani Srimani as Madhusudan
- Amarnath Mukhopadhyay as Hemadakanta, Madhab's lawyer
- Ashok Mitra as Prankeshto
- Rasharaj Chakraborty as Shibkali
- Parijat Bose as Adalat Ali, Madhab's servant
- Ajay Banerjee as Hemadakanta's assistant lawyer
- Kalyani Ghosh
- Jhuma Mukhopadhyay

== Production and themes ==
Stree was one of the rare film that featured Uttam Kumar "as a villain", portraying the role of a rich and reckless landlord named Madhab Dutta, who is also described as a womanizer and drunkard. Soumitra Chatterjee plays the role of a photographer named Sitapati, who comes approaches Dutta for a job and is appointed as Dutta's official photographer. Sitapati later finds out that his former lover Mrinmayee (played by Arati Bhattacharya) is married to Dutta, who later resumes her relationship with Sitapati finding her marriage to Dutta as lonely and loveless. Sitapati frequently accompanies Dutta in places where he visits, photographing his alcoholism, promiscuity and villainy. Stree is available to watch for free in the internet and online.

The film's screenplay is written by its director, Salil Dutta, and is based on a novel written by Bimal Mitra, which is set during World War II in Europe. Salil Dutta's choice of casting Chatterjee and Kumar in the lead roles was uncommon in cinema. Chatterjee and Kumar were cast together in the lead roles before Stree in the 1961 film Jhinder Bondi by Tapan Sinha, which gave an example of their acting together. During the filming of Stree, their popularity was at large in their careers, and were reported to have a personal feud between them brought up by gossip. Its commercial success in the box office was supported by the contributions of music director Nachiketa Ghosh to the soundtrack, having hit songs, including "Khirki Theke Singhaduar" and "Hazar Takar Jharbatita".

== Soundtrack ==
Stree

Soundtrack album by Nachiketa Ghosh
- Released: 1972
- Studio: Baby June Production
- Genre: Feature Film Soundtrack
- Length: 16:19
- Label: Saregama
- Producer: Pradyat Kumar Basu

Nachiketa Ghosh chronology
Notun Diner Alo (1972)	Stree (1972)	Agnibhramar (1973)

All lyrics are written by Gauriprasanna Mazumder and Pulak Bandyopadhyay; all music is composed by Nachiketa Ghosh. The song "Hazar Takar Jharbatita" became a huge hit.

Songs
No.	Title	Lyrics	Playback	Length
1.	"Khirki Theke Singhaduar"	Pulak Bandyopadhyay	Hemanta Mukherjee	3:30
2.	"Sakkhi Thakuk Jhorapata"	Pulak Bandyopadhyay	Hemanta Mukherjee	3:17
3.	"Shokhi Kalo Amar Bhalo Lage Naa"	Gauriprasanna Mazumder	Manna Dey, Hemanta Mukherjee	3:00
4.	"Jemon Shapini Ke Posh Manay Ojha"	Gauriprasanna Mazumder	Manna Dey	3:08
5.	"Hazaar Takar Jharbatita"	Gauriprasanna Mazumder	Manna Dey, Hemanta Mukherjee	3:24
Total length:				16:19

== Reception ==
The Times of India wrote "Stree, one of the finest works of Uttam Kumar, reminds us that icons like him are rare. Uttam Kumar stepped out of his romantic image and tried something just the opposite. A drunkard Bengali zamindar without any sense of chastity – he was unrecognizable in this negative character. Yet he bamboozled everyone with this persona. Even critics admitted only Uttam Kumar can do this. The Uttam-Soumitra movie remains a classic one and Uttam's dialogues still haunt us.

== Awards ==
BFJA Awards (1973)

- BFJA Best Actor - Uttam Kumar
- BFJA Best Actor In a Supporting Role - Soumitra Chatterjee
- BFJA Award Best Dialogue - Salil Dutta
- BFJA Award Best Lyrics - Pulak Bandopadhyay
- BFJA Award Best Music Direction - Nachiketa Ghosh
- BFJA Award Best Playback Singer (Male) - Manna Dey

== Remake ==
The film was remade in Hindi in 1982 as Ayaash directed and produced by Shakti Samanta and starring Sanjeev Kumar in lead.
