= Kamal Mitra =

Indian actor

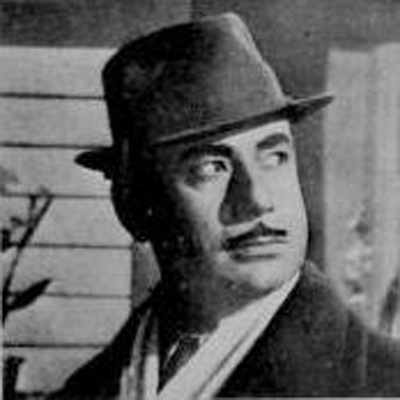
- Kamal Mitra in 1948 film Sabyasachi
- Born: 9 December 1912; Burdwan, Bengal Presidency, British India
- Died: 2 August 1993 (aged 80); Kolkata, West Bengal, India
- Occupation: Actor
- Years active: 1943–1981

Kamal Mitra was an Indian actor who appeared in more than 335 films spanning more than four decades. Along with Chhabi Biswas and Pahari Sanyal he dominated the Bengali silver screen as a character actor. Mitra played a number of prominent roles in mythological and social movies. His baritone voice and imposing physicality often saw him cast in roles of strict authoritative characters.

== Personal life ==
Kamal Mitra was born on 9 December 1912 in Burdwan. He joined the military immediately after his graduation. Hailing from the well-known Mitra family of Barddhaman, he was a keen sportsman and a good footballer. Before making his foray into acting, he had worked at the District Magistrate & Collector's Office in Barddhaman. He was an avid reader and a collector of rare books. He donated his vast collection of books to Nandan, the centre of films, film studies and film-archive, in Kolkata. He also performed in radio-plays. His autobiography, 'Flashback', provides an insight to the world of Bengali cinema. He retired from acting in the early 1980s and died in 1993. He had two daughters and one son.

== Filmography ==
- Nilangurio (1943)
- Kansa (1944)
- Mahishasur Badh (1945)
- Pather Dabi (1947)
- Sabyasachi (1948)
- Abhijatri (1949)
- Sabyasachi (1948)
- Vidyasagar (1950)
- Ananda Math (1952)
- Jighansa (1951)
- Agnipariksha (1954)
- Shap Mochan (1955)
- Silpi (1956)
- Saat Number Bari (1946)
- Badhu (1962)
- Parash Pathar (1958)
- Ekti Raat (1956)
- Naba Bidhan (1954)
- Satir Dehatyag (1954)
- Bir Hambir (1955)
- Louha Kapat (1958)
- Sagarika (1956)
- Sabar Upare (1955)
- Hospital (1960)
- Jamalaye Jibanta Manush (1958)
- Suryatoran (1958)
- Ashite Ashiona (1967)
- Bibhas (1964)
- Bhanu Pelo Lottery (1958)
- Deya Neya (1964)
- Thana Theke Aschi (1965)
- Sesh Anka (1963)
- Chirodiner (1969)
- Barnali (1963)
- Parineeta (1969)
- Kaal Tumi Aaleya (1966)
- Monihaar (1966)
- Jeeban Mrityu (1967)
- Sabarmati (1969)
- Pitaputra (1969)
- Teen Bhubaner Paare (1969)
- Harmonium (1976)
- Phulu Takurma (1974)
- Raudrachhaya (1973)
- Jaal Sannyasi (1977)
- Aaro Ekjon (1980)
- Asadharan (1976)
- Daksha Yagna (1980)
- Khelar Putul (1981)
