= Uttam Kumar =

Indian actor, director and producer (1926–1980)

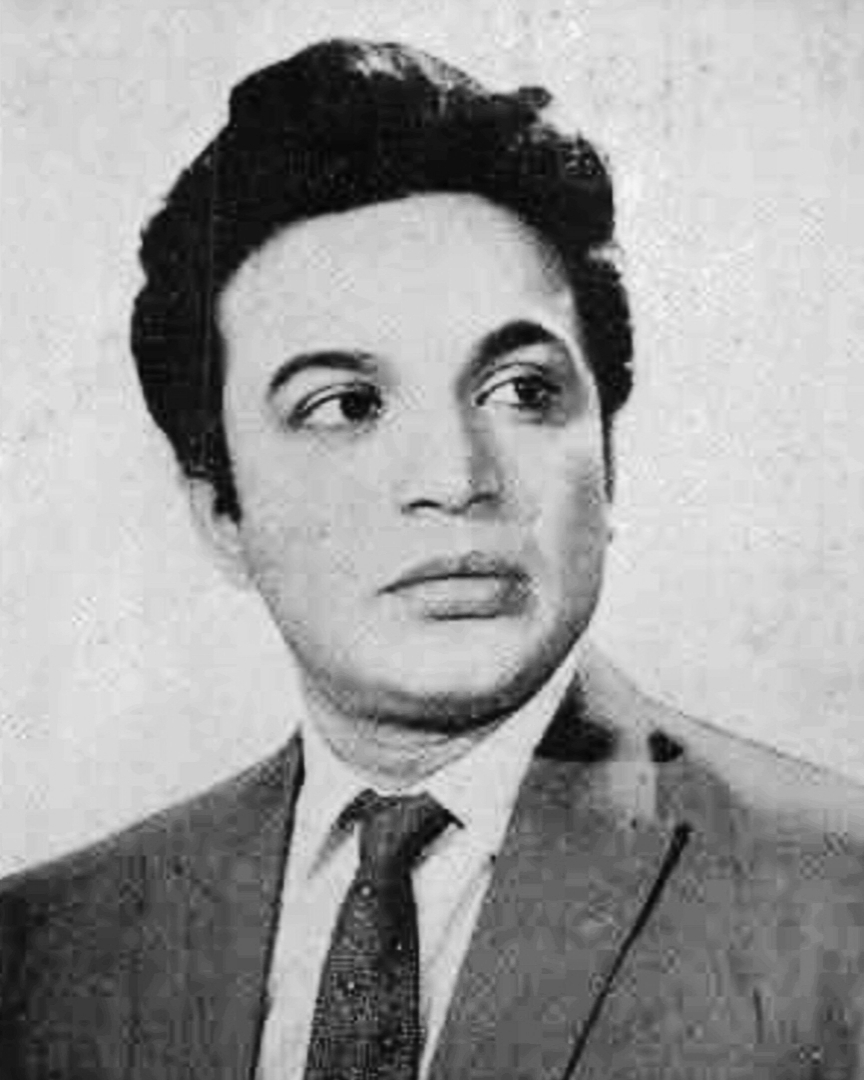
- Pronunciation: [ˈut̪ːɔm ˈkumaɾ]
- Born: Arun Kumar Chatterjee; 3 September 1926; Calcutta, Bengal Presidency, British Raj
- Died: 24 July 1980 (aged 53); Calcutta, West Bengal, India
- Other name: Mahanayak
- Education: Goenka College of Commerce and Business Administration
- Occupations: Actor; producer; director
- Years active: 1948–1980
- Works: Filmography
- Spouse: Gauri Ganguly (m. 1948; sep. 1963)
- Partner: Supriya Devi (m. 1963–1980)
- Children: Gautam Chatterjee (son)
- Relatives: Tarun Kumar Chatterjee (brother); Gourab Chatterjee (grandson)
- Awards: Full list

Signature
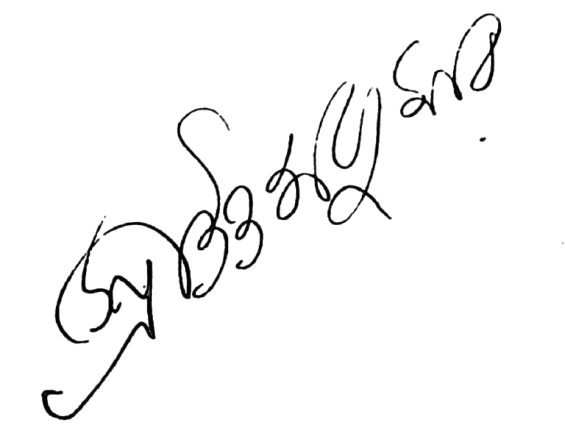

Arun Kumar Chatterjee (Note: Bengali pronunciation: [ˈoɾun ˈkumaɾ ˈt͡ʃɔʈːopad̪ʱːae̯].) (3 September 1926 – 24 July 1980), known professionally as Uttam Kumar, (Note: Bengali: [ˈut̪ːɔm ˈkumaɾ].) was an Indian actor, director, producer, screenwriter, composer, and playback singer who predominantly worked in Bengali cinema. A cultural icon of Bengal and widely regarded as one of the greatest and most successful actors in the history of Indian cinema, Kumar dominated Bengali cinema from the 1950s throughout the 1970s, being referred to as "Mahanayak". (Note: Bengali: [ˈmɔɦanae̯ɔk]; lit. 'The Great Hero'.) His accolades include five National Awards and four Filmfare Awards.

In a career spanning over five decades, Kumar worked in 211 films until his death in 1980. After several years of acting in plays, he made his film debut in the 1948 film Drishtidan in a supporting role. The film was produced by M. P. Productions. By the early 1950s, he moved to lead roles and had his first box office hit with Basu Paribar (1952), following a series of unsuccessful ventures. He first gained popularity with Sharey Chuattor (1953), in which he starred opposite his frequent co-star Suchitra Sen. He consistently starred in top-grossing films from the mid-1950s to the 1960s such as Champadangar Bou, Agni Pariksha, Shap Mochan, Sabar Uparey, Sagarika, Ekti Raat, Harano Sur, Pathey Holo Deri, Indrani, Maya Mriga, Saptapadi, Bipasha, Bhranti Bilash, Deya Neya, Kokhono Megh, as well as some of his most acclaimed performances include Upahar, Raat Bhore, Saheb Bibi Golam, Shyamali, Marutirtha Hinglaj, Bicharak, Abak Prithibi, Kuhak, Khokababur Pratyabartan, Jhinder Bondi, Sesh Anka, Uttarayan, Jatugriha, Nayak, Chowringhee, Chiriyakhana and Antony Firingee. He achieved further superstardom and appreciation in the 1970s, for starring in several successful ventures with different genres, including Nishi Padma, Rajkumari, Bilambita Loy, Dhanyee Meye, Chhadmabeshi, Stree, Mem Saheb, Andha Atit, Bon Palashir Padabali, Amanush, Sanyasi Raja, Agnishwar, Mouchak, Bagh Bondi Khela, Sabyasachi, Ananda Ashram, Bandie, Nishan, Dhanraj Tamang, Brojobuli, Pankhiraj, Dui Prithibi, Ogo Bodhu Shundori and Kalankini Kankabati.

Apart from acting, Kumar showed his versatility in other fields, including as a director and screenwriter of films such as Sudhu Ekti Bachhar, Bon Palashir Padabali and Kalankini Kankabati, as a composer in Kal Tumi Aleya and Sabyasachi, and as a singer in Nabajanma.

Kumar was the first recipient of the National Award in the Best Actor category for his work in Antony Firingee and Chiriyakhana. He is the namesake of Mahanayak Uttam Kumar metro station in Tollygunge and the Mahanayak Samman Award given by the Government of West Bengal.

== Early life ==
Uttam Kumar was born as Arun Kumar Chattopadhyay on 3 September 1926 at his maternal home situated at 51 Ahiritola Street in northern Calcutta (now Kolkata), in the Bengal Province of British India (now in West Bengal, India). His father was Satkari Chattopadhyay, a Hindu Brahmin from Hooghly district, and his mother was Chapala Devi. Initially, he was named "Uttam" by his maternal grandfather, although his mother did not like this name, so the name "Arun" was given. Sripurna Sanyasi, the spiritual master of his maternal family, predicted that the entire country would recognise him by the name "Uttam", seeing his smile.

Belonging to an extended middle-class family, Kumar's father was a film projectionist in Metro Cinema. He had two brothers, Barun and Tarun, of which the latter also became an actor. His ancestral home was at 46/A Girish Mukherjee Road in Bhabanipur, where his interest in acting grew by watching the Jatra rehearsals and performences by the group Suhreed Samaj, founded by his father and uncle.

Kumar first studied in Chakraberia High School, where his first acting opportunity came at the age of five in the Gayasur play, for which he was awarded a medal, in the child role of Gayasur. In 1936, he founded a theatre group called Lunar Club, along with his friends, whose first production was Rabindranath Tagore's Mukut. It turned out to become a huge success, that the artists were offered a room for their rehearsals at a neighbour's home. His father selected him to play the role of Balarama in Suhreed Samaj's stage production Brajer Kanai.

In 1940, Kumar moved to South Suburban School (Main), where he passed matriculation with second division in 1942. He joined Government Commercial College (now Goenka College of Commerce and Business Administration) for his higher studies in 1943, where he passed B. Com standard, and joined Calcutta Port Trust as a clerk in the cash department, with a monthly salary of ₹275. In 1943, Kumar also donated ₹1,700 to the fund of the Indian National Army, which was earned from a special stage production of Bankim Chandra Chatterjee's Anandamath by the Lunar Club.

Kumar took classical music training from Nidanbandhu Banerjee in his childhood. An admirer of Johnny Weissmuller, he was the champion of hundred yards Freestyle at Bhabanipur Swimming Association for three consecutive seasons. He also learned yoga, wrestling and Lathi Khela, a traditional Bengali martial art. As a skilled footballer, Kumar used to play in the right-back position and was a lifelong Mohun Bagan supporter. At the same time, he was equally interested in playing volleyball and cricket.

== Career ==
=== Early career (1947–1951) ===
Kumar entered the film industry in 1947, appearing as an extra in the Hindi film Maya Dore. Although he acted for five days at Bharatlaxmi Studios for a fee of ₹125, the film remained unreleased. His first acting role in a film was in the younger role of the central character played by Asit Baran in Drishtidan (1948), directed by Nitin Bose; this film was under his birth name Arun Kumar Chattophadyay. The following year, in 1949, he appeared for the first time as the hero in the film Kamona, changing his name again to "Uttam Chatterjee". Later he changed his name again to "Arup Kumar" with the 1950 film Maryada, where he first got the opportunity to lip-sync to a song. In 1951, Kumar joined M. P. Productions as a staff artist. The same year, he starred in Agradoot's Sahajatri. It was the first film in which he used the name "Uttam Kumar", at the advice of Pahari Sanyal. In this film, he met singer-songwriter Hemanta Mukherjee, lip-syncing over whose voice later went on to gain his popularity.

By the age of 26, following by his appearances in a series of unsuccessful films, such as Ore Jatri, Nastaneer and Sanjibani, Kumar was derogatorily nicknamed "Flop Master General". He was hugely disappointed and decided to leave the film industry. By this time, Kumar continued working at the Port Trust simultaneously.

=== Initial success and breakthrough (1952–1954) ===
In 1952, Kumar was then discovered by director Nirmal Dey, who cast him in one of the lead roles in M. P. Production's Basu Paribar, where he starred opposite Supriya Devi, one of his later frequent co-stars, for the first time. Dey "saw his talent, which most makers didn't. He was exceptional, a genius actor who was in films that weren't good." However, Basu Paribar was a box-office success and one of the highest-grossing films of that year, breaking Kumar's dry spell at the box office and making him a star. Following its success, he resigned from his job at the Port Commissions, and joined the film industry in a complete manner. Another release in that year was Kar Pape, a social problem film addressing the matters of syphilis, a sharp contrast to the romantically themed films that had generally preceded it. However, it initially bombed at the box-office because of its A-certified storyline, Kar Pape later got recognition for its groundbreaking theme.

In 1953, Kumar collaborated with Dey for the second time in Sharey Chuattor, a multistarrer comedy which was his first time appearance with Suchitra Sen. It became a trend-setter by running for over 63 weeks in single-screens and emerged as the highest-grossing Bengali film of the year. Sharey Chuattor also created a history for being the first film to be screened at Paradise cinema hall, a theatre of Kolkata where mostly Hindi films were used to be shown throughout a year. The Times of India ranks the film in their list of Bengali cinema's all-time greatest comedy films. The same year, Kumar played Uday in Bou Thakuranir Haat, based on Rabindranath Tagore's 1883 novel of the same name. The flow of successes continued for Kumar in 1954. He began the year with Moner Mayur and Ora Thake Odhare, both of which ended up as moderate commercial successes. After this, he starred in Nirmal Dey's drama film Champadangar Bou, a box-office success. Another film in this year included Maraner Pare, Sadanander Mela and the National Award winning Annapurnar Mandir. Kumar's first breakthrough role came with Agradoot's musical romance Agni Pariksha; it coincidentally released on Kumar's 27th birthday, giving birth to a new image of him, that of a "romantic hero". The film opened to excellent response, eventually taking top spot at the box office that year and emerging an All Time Blockbuster as well as Kumar's biggest up to that point of time. Kumar's performance in the film is considered as one of the most iconic performances in Tollywood history.

Agni Pariksha had a special contribution in terms of promotion in the history of Bengali cinema. M. P. Productions used the signatures of both Kumar and Sen on the poster of film as the main attraction under the tagline "Witness of Our Real Love". It created speculation as Kumar's wife Gauri Devi and Sen's husband Dibanath Sen did not take the caption in well. However, his on-screen chemistry with Sen in the film gained huge popularity, which later went on to be named the "Uttam-Suchitra magic". It was the first of many collaborations between Agradoot and Kumar; the team wrote many of their subsequent scripts and films with Kumar in mind for the lead role, and insisted on him being cast for their later films. By this time, Kumar had developed his distinct, signature style of understated acting of mumbling his dialogues while giving myriad expressions and meanings to lines that his characters uttered.

=== Rise to prominence (1955–1959) ===
In 1955, Kumar starred in a variety of film genres, from the mythological Raikamal and the psychological drama Hrad to the romantic drama Saajher Pradip. He received his first BFJA Award in the Best Actor category, for his portrayal of a short term anterograde amnesia patient in Hrad. This was also the year in which he starred in two important films of his career. The first was the musical blockbuster Shap Mochan, directed by Sudhir Mukherjee, where he worked with Suchitra Sen, Bikash Roy, Pahari Sanyal, Kamal Mitra and Tulsi Chakraborty. Emerged as a blockbuster at the box-office, his combination with Hemanta Mukherjee became iconic, and they later became the most popular singer-actor duo. The Times of India ranks Shap Mochan among Ten Must-Watch Bengali films featuring Uttam Kumar and Suchitra Sen. The other, released on 1 December 1955, was the crime-noir Sabar Uparey, a reworking of A. J. Cronin's 1950 novel Beyond This Place. The same year, Kumar stepped into the art-house dramas, maidenly collaborating with Tapan Sinha and Mrinal Sen in their respective directorials Upahar and Raat Bhore. Though the former one was a moderate success, the second film which also marks Sen's directorial debut, became both critically and commercially unsuccessful at that point of time. On its failure, Sen himself had mentioned many times that it was not at all a memorable film of him by any standards, despite having Kumar's promising performance.

Kumar played the role of a young medical student in the blockbuster Sagarika in 1956, co-starring Suchitra Sen. He got critically acclaimed for his performance in the social drama Saheb Bibi Golam. Based on a 1953 novel of the same name by Bimal Mitra, the film explores the tragic fall of feudalism in Bengal during the British Raj. Despite its heavy and female-centric theme, Saheb Bibi Golam went on to become a superhit, and became an influence for Abrar Alvi and Guru Dutt to remake it into Hindi as Saheb, Biwi Aur Ghulam (1962). Biswajeet Chatterjee was influenced by Kumar's performance from the film, when he used to play the same character in its stage adaptation under Rangamancha Theatres. The same year, Kumar had an extended cameo in Ajoy Kar's Shyamali; it was previously staged under the production of Star Theatres, where he used to play the same role he played in the film, adapting it from the original story by Nirupama Devi. Kaberi Bose played the titular role opposite Kumar in the film, whereas it was played by Sabitri Chatterjee on stage. Despite having been seen that any successful play did not perform well commercially when picturised in film, Shyamali was an exception, setting a landmark. He was cast by Debaki Kumar Bose in Chirakumar Sabha and Nabajanma, in the latter of which Kumar made his debut as a singer by singing six verses of Vaishnava Padavali, composed by Nachiketa Ghosh. His other major hits that year include Ekti Raat and Trijama, both of which co-starred Suchitra Sen.

Kumar formed his own production house Alo Chhaya Productions, in joint venture with Ajoy Kar in 1957. He made his debut as a producer, starring in Kar's psychological romance Harano Sur, which emerged as the highest-earning film of that year. Inspired by Mervyn LeRoy's American film Random Harvest (1942), the film received Certificate of Merit for Third Best Feature Film in Bengali at the 5th National Film Awards. He played an amnesiac patient, who was rescued from the torturous confines of the mental hospital by one of its doctors. Apart from it, Kumar paired with Suchitra Sen in the musical romance Pathey Holo Deri, the first Bengali film to be shot in gevacolor, and in Chandranath, the first Indian film to be released in Metro Cinema. Following the successes of these, Asit Sen directed Jiban Trishna with Kumar and Sen in the lead, which also became a box-office hit, running for over 70 days in theatres. His other releases of 1957, Bardidi and Abhayer Biye, underperformed, with the latter ending its run with average numbers owing to huge costs, but the crime noir Tasher Ghar, in which he played dual roles for the first time, was a box office hit. This changed in 1958 with back-to-back huge blockbusters alongside Suchitra Sen in Rajlakshmi O Srikanta, Indrani and Surya Toran, each being among the top 5 highest-grossing films of 1958. The song "Sab Kuchh Lutakar Huye Hum Tumhare" sung by Mohammed Rafi without any remuneration, used in Indrani, was the first Hindi song in a Bengali film. In the same year, he appeared alongside Arundhati Devi in Mangal Chakraborty's action-adventure Shikar, which proved to be a flop.

In 1959, Kumar got appreciation for his performance in Bikash Roy's mythological drama Marutirtha Hinglaj, which also became a commercial success. Tarun Kumar, who also acted in the film, mentioned a specific incident during its filming in his book Amar Dada Uttam Kumar, where the character played by Kumar would choke Sabitri Chatterjee's character out of anger, in a dream sequence; during its shooting, Kumar had got so deep into his character that he actually pressed Chatterjee's throat, and later apologised to her. He appeared in the spy thriller Sonar Harin and the satirical comedy Abak Prithibi, both of which succeeded at the box-office. Bicharak, which was released at the end of 1959, was a highly anticipated project as it saw him playing an anti-heroic character of a judge haunted by his past, and it opened to favourable reviews, particularly towards Kumar's performance and won National Film Award for Best Feature Film in Bengali at the 7th National Film Awards. Following his other blockbuster film Chaowa Paowa with Suchitra Sen, he was referred to the title "Mahanayak" by the famous magazine Ultorath.

Shap Mochan and Sabar Uparey are often credited with exalting Kumar to the heights of superstardom, two years after he became a star with Sharey Chuattor and Agni Pariksha, and consolidating his domination of the industry throughout the late-1950s, 1960s and 1970s.

=== Superstardom and expansion (1960–1975) ===
In the 1960s, Kumar became a highly successful star. In 1960, he starred in nine films, starting with Shuno Baranari and Raja Saja, both of which were hits. He garnered the most appreciation for appearing in a supporting but major role in Chitta Bose's Maya Mriga, starring Biswajeet Chatterjee and Sandhya Roy, as well as in the iconic Khokababur Pratyabortan, based on a story by Rabindranath Tagore. On his performance as a loyal servant in the latter, The Times of India wrote "It’s not an easy task for a charismatic lead actor to jump into the role of a next door loyal servant. Uttam Kumar excelled it so well that it is still regarded as one of the most touching Bengali films ever created." In the same year, Kumar played another anti-heroic role in the noir Kuhak, an adaptation of The Night of the Hunter (1955), which gained a cult status generally, in spite of its box-office failure.

In 1961, Kumar played triple role in Tapan Sinha's action-adventure Jhinder Bondi, a reworking of Anthony Hope's novel The Prisoner of Zenda (1894). Notable for portraying Kumar as an action hero, a far cry from his romantic roles, Jhinder Bondi was the first film where the biggest superstars as well as acting giants of Bengali cinema – Kumar and Soumitra Chatterjee shared screen together, as the protagonist and antagonist respectively. A sword fight scene between him and Chatterjee in the film, is often described as a "battle" showcasing their contrasting acting styles. It is also ranked at the sixteenth position at IMDb's list of "The 100 greatest Indian films of all time". That year, another memorable film in his career came in the epic romance Saptapadi, alongside Suchitra Sen. It was nominated in the Grand Pix category at Moscow International Film Festival in 1963. The iconic bike sequence from the song "Ei Path Jodi Naa Shesh Hoy" featuring him and Sen, has been cited as "Still road-worthy" by The Telegraph. Both Jhinder Bondi and Saptapadi taking top spot at the box office that year and emerging an All Time Blockbuster as well as Kumar's biggest up to that point of time.

In 1962, Kumar met success with Bipasha and Shiulibari, also appearing in two exceptional films – Kanna and Amar Desh, whereas the latter was a short film. He once again resumed dual roles in films such as the action comedy Bhranti Bilash and the war drama Uttarayan in 1963. An adaptation of William Shakespeare's The Comedy of Errors, Bhranti Bilash had both Kumar and Bhanu Banerjee in dual roles, playing identical sets of masters and servants to immense confusion among the other characters. In the same year, he starred in Deya Neya, which was his hundredth film as an actor. His towering performance as an established singer in the film garnered as a cult, emerging to be a blockbuster at the box-office. He further portrayed anti-heroic roles in the action thrillers Nishithe and Sesh Anka; whereas the latter is considered as "a textbook on thriller writing" by Sankha Ghosh of The Times of India. He collaborated with Tapan Sinha for the fourth time in Jatugriha in 1964, which he also produced for his newly formed banner of Uttam Kumar Films Private Limited, breaking up Alo Chhaya Productions with Ajoy Kar. India Today described the film as "A Forgotten 'Modern' Classic" and wrote "It is very much in evident in Jatugriha, where Kumar jusifies his statement of changing his acting styles with each co-star, playing a couple in and out of love alongside Arundhati Devi, without an iota of mushiness." His next release was the action drama Lal Pathore, where he played a landlord. In 1965, he gave another iconic performance in his career in Thana Theke Aschhi, a psychological thriller where his portrayal of a cop is included in Digital Studio India's list of Uttam Kumar's memorable performances.

Kumar collaborated with Satyajit Ray for the first time in 1966 on the National Award-winning film Nayak; though he was approached previously by Ray to play the role of Sandip in his Ghare Baire adaptation which he had completed in 1956, but Kumar refused, believing the role would be better for an established actor. Ray wrote the script of Nayak, keeping Kumar in mind, which attained a cult status in the history of Bengali cinema. For his performance in the film, he earned his third BFJA Award for Best Actor. At the 16th Berlin International Film Festival, Nayak received the UNICRIT Award. Besides, Elizabeth Taylor was impressed with Kumar's performance and wanted to work with and meet him. During a premiere at Indira Cinema, Kumar's shirts was snatched by the frenzied fans. Apart from it, in the same year, Kumar made his directorial debut with Shudhu Ekti Bachhar, while his next release Kal Tumi Aleya was also uncreditedly directed by himself. Besides, Kal Tumi Aleya also marked his debut as a composer. In this phase, another success came with the action film Rajodrohi (1966), which named him "The Robin Hood of Bengal" for his performance.

In 1967, Kumar was cast as Byomkesh Bakshi by Ray in Chiriyakhana, in their second collaboration. Despite being considered as "the worst film by Ray" for its complex storyline and unfaithfulness to the original novel by Sharadindu Bandyopadhyay, Chiriyakhana later attained a cult following among the audience. Later, he played the titular character in the biographical film Anthony Firingee, based on the life of Hensman Anthony, a renowned Portuguese-Bengali folk poet. For his performances in both Chiriyakhana and Antony Firingee, Kumar became the first recipient to earn the National Film Award for Best Actor at the 15th National Film Awards in 1968, when the Government of India instituted the honour. In the same year, he made his Hindi film debut alongside Vyjayanthimala in Chhoti Si Mulaqat, also produced by him. A remake of Agni Pariksha, the film bombed at the box-office. Though he also got several opportunities to make his debut in Hindi cinema before, he turned down all the offers, which include Biren Nag's Bees Saal Baad (1962) and the second lead in Raj Kapoor's Sangam, whereas the latter was previously declined by Dilip Kumar and Dev Anand. His other major hits that year include Jiban Mrityu, Nayika Sangbad and Grihadaha.

Kumar gave another iconic performance in Chowringhee in 1968, which was based on the 1962 novel of the same name by Sankar. Opined as "The film defining Uttam Kumar's charisma mostly", Chowringhee is ranked among Film Companion's list of 10 Best Performances of Uttam Kumar. Besides, he played an undercover cop in the action thriller Kokhono Megh and an industrialist in Tin Adhyay, both of which emerged as one of the highest grossers that year. Kumar also did a cameo as Mir Jumla II in the historical film Garh Nasimpur. In 1969, Kumar appeared in several successful films including Shuk Sari, Sabarmati and Chirodiner, but the mostly notable was Aparichita, an adaptation of Fydoor Dostoevsky's famous novel The Idiot. His success flowed with several masala films, such as Mon Niye, Rajkumari, Manjari Opera and Duti Mon in 1970. After these, Kumar appeared in Kalankita Nayak and Nishi Padma, where the latter was the highest-grossing film of the year. The Film Companion critic Shantanu Ray Chaudhuri considered Nishi Padma as "the definitive Uttam Kumar performance after Nayak". At the same time, he delivered another hit in Bilambita Loy, an adaptation of the 1954 version of A Star Is Born. In 1971, Kumar appeared in the blockbusters Jay Jayanti, Dhanyee Meye, Nabaraag and Chhadmabeshi, and also enjoyed critical acclaim with Jiban Jigyasa and Ekhane Pinjar, whereas he earned his fifth BFJA Best Actor Award for the latter.

In 1972, Kumar played another negatively unconventional role in Salil Dutta's action drama Stree, co-starring Soumitra Chatterjee and Arati Bhattacharya. His portrayal of a morally degenerated landlord in the film earned him his sixth BFJA Best Actor Award. He got further recognition in the role of a journalist alongside Aparna Sen in the political romance Mem Saheb. Other releases that year, the action films like Andha Atit and Chhinnapatra were average fares, but Alo Amar Alo and Har Mana Har were highly successful, reimagining his on-screen partnership with Suchitra Sen. Kumar's first release in 1973 was his own directorial Bon Palashir Padaboli, an action drama which also emerged as the highest grossing Bengali film of 1973. Based on Ramapada Chowdhury's novel of the same name, the film was cited by Kumar as his "dream project". He also had two hits that year, Roudro Chhaya and Sonar Khancha, and received praise for his performance in Ajoy Kar's psychological horror film Kayahiner Kahini, which attracted considerable attention from the media due to Kumar's dual role portrayal. Although the film did not do well commercially, it gained cult status in later years and is considered one of Kar's best works ever.

Kumar collaborated with Tarun Majumdar in the detective thriller Jadi Jantem in 1974, in which he portrayed the role of P. K. Basu, a fictional character created by Narayan Sanyal. He did an extended cameo in the Biswajeet Chatterjee directorial Rakta Tilak, which became commercially unsuccessful, while he further achieved success by resetting his image of a "romantic hero" in the films Alor Thikana and Bikele Bhorer Phool. Partha Pratim Chowdhury's political drama Jadu Bansha, which had Kumar as a middleclass businessman, was unanimously praised by critics, while the film was a box-office bomb. Before the end of the year, Kumar delivered a stellar performance in Shakti Samanta's action film Amanush. Simultaneously shot in Bengali and Hindi, the former version released during Durga Puja, while the latter version released in March 1975. Kumar's performance in the film saw him receiving both his first Filmfare Award for Best Actor and the seventh time BFJA Best Actor Award, and also marks his return to Hindi cinema after Chhoti Si Mulaqat. Running for over 96 weeks in theatres, Amanush became the most successful film of all time in Kumar's entire career. The film also became iconic for his chemistry with Kishore Kumar as a popular actor-singer duo. Besides, the success of the film established Kumar as a bonafide box office draw and the film recorded a large repeat audience. Amanush was re-released many times and grossed several times more than its original run, with many theatres showing it to packed houses.

1975 was the best year of Kumar's career for showing his versatility in separate generic films, starting with the classic comedy Mouchak, a box-office hit. Emerged a superhit with its songs, including "Ebar Mole Suto Hobo", "Ta Bole Ki Prem Debe Naa" and "Pagla Garod Kothay Achhe" which became immensely popular among the masses and made its soundtrack one of the best-selling Bengali film albums of the 1970s, Mouchak had Kumar and Ranjit Mallick together for the first time, whereas the latter was a rising star then. His next two releases were two light-hearted drama films, Ami, Shey O Shakha and Nagar Darpane, both of which were moderately successful. In spite of his portrayal of an egoistical and no-nonsense doctor the satire Agnishwar being widely considered to be another milestone in his filmography by fans as well as critics, Kumar hit the big league with Pijush Basu's magnum-opus Sanyasi Raja. Inspired by the Bhawal Court Case (1936–1942), the film had Kumar as a mysterious monk who returns to the royal estate claiming to be the "suspected to be dead" temperamental king. It was declared an all time blockbuster and was the highest-grossing film of the year, with his iconic dialogues in the film becoming iconic and a pop-culture reference. In that same year, the political thriller Bagh Bondi Khela showed Kumar as a corrupt politician, which was also a massive success. Owing to Kumar's performance in another negative role, The Times of India critic Kashinath Basu opined "Even dirty politics become enjoyable when you have Uttam Kumar on the screen." 1975 is arguably considered his annus mirabilis since all of his six releases in the same year were box office successes, namely Mouchak, Sanyasi Raja, Agnishwar, Nagar Darpane, Bagh Bondi Khela and Ami, Shey O Shakha being the consecutive highest-grossing Bengali films of the year, a rare feat in Bengali cinema.

=== Last years (1976–1980) ===
Despite having back-to-back success however, Kumar's star power began to wane as his subsequent releases like Hotel Snow Fox, Anandamela, Mombati and Chander Kachhakachhi (all released in 1976) did not do well commercially, excluding Pijush Basu's action thriller Banhishikha (1976). He did gain success during this period with superhits in Salil Dutta's masala film Sei Chokh and Rabi Ghosh's directorial debut film Nidhiram Sardar, a vigilante film. Notably, in spite of a decline in number of hits, it was during this era that Kumar won his eighth BFJA Award for Best Actor for his performance as a Mafia don in Banhishikha, which was a record win at that time.

In 1977, Kumar collaborated with Pijush Basu for two films – Rajbansha and Sabyasachi, in order to attempt to reprise his earlier success as an action hero, but the former was a moderate success and the latter became financially failure. He appeared in Asadharan, Bhola Moira and received praise for Jaal Sanyasi. In the same year, he worked with Shakti Samanta for the second time in Ananda Ashram, another bilingual film. A remake of the 1941 Bengali film Daktar, the film re-introduced Kumar's previous image of a romantic hero, also having the same cast of Amanush. The Bengali version of Ananda Ashram became a huge success and ran for over 26 weeks, but the Hindi version failed to have impact on audiences, emerging to be a flop. Before the end of the year, Kumar collaborated with Gulzar for another Hindi film Kitaab, co-starring Vidya Sinha and Shreeram Lagoo. Though his performance was widespreadly acclaimed, it proved to be an average grosser.

In 1978, he worked on superhit Dhanraj Tamang for which he won Best Actor Award in Filmfare Award East. In 1979 he worked on Sunayani which was a hit. But between these films, many films flopped and were average. In 1980 Dui Prithibi was released, and became successful and critically acclaimed after a long time. This was the last film released during his lifetime.

After his death some films were released; one of them Ogo Badhu Sundori (1981), became a huge success at the box office and ran for 26 weeks. Later releases Kalankini Kankabati which he directed, and Protisodh were also successful. In 1982 a Hindi film, Desh Premee, was released in which Uttam Kumar worked in an important supporting role. His last released film in 1987 was a Hindi film Mera Karam Mera Dharam where he appeared for a brief role.

== Songs in the lip of Uttam Kumar ==
Another key reason for Uttam Kumar's immense popularity was the picturization of many highly popular songs through his acting and screen presence singularly or jointly with co-actors/actresses in various movies. The first ever such pairing of a singer with Kumar occurred was with Hemanta Mukherjee. Though Kumar was associated with Mukherjee for the first time in the Bengali film Sahajatri (1951), it was in 1955 some thing wonderful happened. Hemanta Mukherjee was associated in the movie Shap Mochan and some timeless songs were created in the lip of Uttam Kumar, such as Shono Bandhu Shono, Surer Aakashe Tumi Je Go, Jhar Uthechhe Baul Batas and Bose Achhi Path Cheye, and since, the voice of Hemanta Mukherjee and Kumars lipsync had become identical,synchronus and iconic. Manna Dey first sang playback for Uttam Kumar in the Bengali film Gali Theke Rajpath (1959), with music composed by Sudhin Dasgupta, and another soleful partnership began, which was extended to about fifty four movies. Shyamal Mitra formed a massively popular and long-lasting musical association with the actor starting from the breakout hit Deya Neya (1963). Kishore Kumar sang memorable numbers for Uttam Kumar in both Bengali and Hindi collaborations viz. Amanush (1975).

== Other works ==
=== Theatre ===
Kumar acted in theatre before debuting in the film industry. In 1953, he returned to theatre, acting in a play called Shyamali under the Star Theater banner. Shyamali created a record by running for over 486 nights. The director Ajoy Kar made a film based on the play with the same title, Shyamali. In the 1970s, Kumar directed plays under the organisation Shilpi Sangshad. He directed three plays, Charankabi Mukunda Das, Sajahan and Charitraheen, but he did not act in these. Later, he acted in Alibaba.

=== Radio controversy ===
Kumar was selected in 1976 to recite the Chandi Path in the All India Radio (AIR) studios. He was criticised by audience members for replacing the role normally served by Birendra Krishna Bhadra. Kumar apologised and Bhadra was reinstated.

== Philanthropy and activism ==
In 1943, Kumar also donated ₹1,700 to the fund of Indian National Army, which was earned from a special stage production of Bankim Chandra Chatterjee's Anandamath by Lunar Club. He also engaged in relief works and fought with extortionists during Kolkata communal riots of 1946.

Uttam Kumar helped poor artists and technicians. In 1968, he left Abhinetri Sangha and founded his own foundation, Shilpi Sangshad, to help poor artists and technicians. He was president of this organisation until his death. He worked in many films without any salary.

For the 1978 flood, he organised a charity cricket match between artists from the Bengali film industry and the Bombay film industry in 1979. He captained the Bengal team while Dilip Kumar captained the Bombay team.

== Personal life ==
Kumar married Gauri Ganguly (27 September 1929 – 21 April 1981) on 1 June 1948. They had a son named Gautam Chatterjee (7 September 1950 – 2 May 2005). They had a troubled marriage.

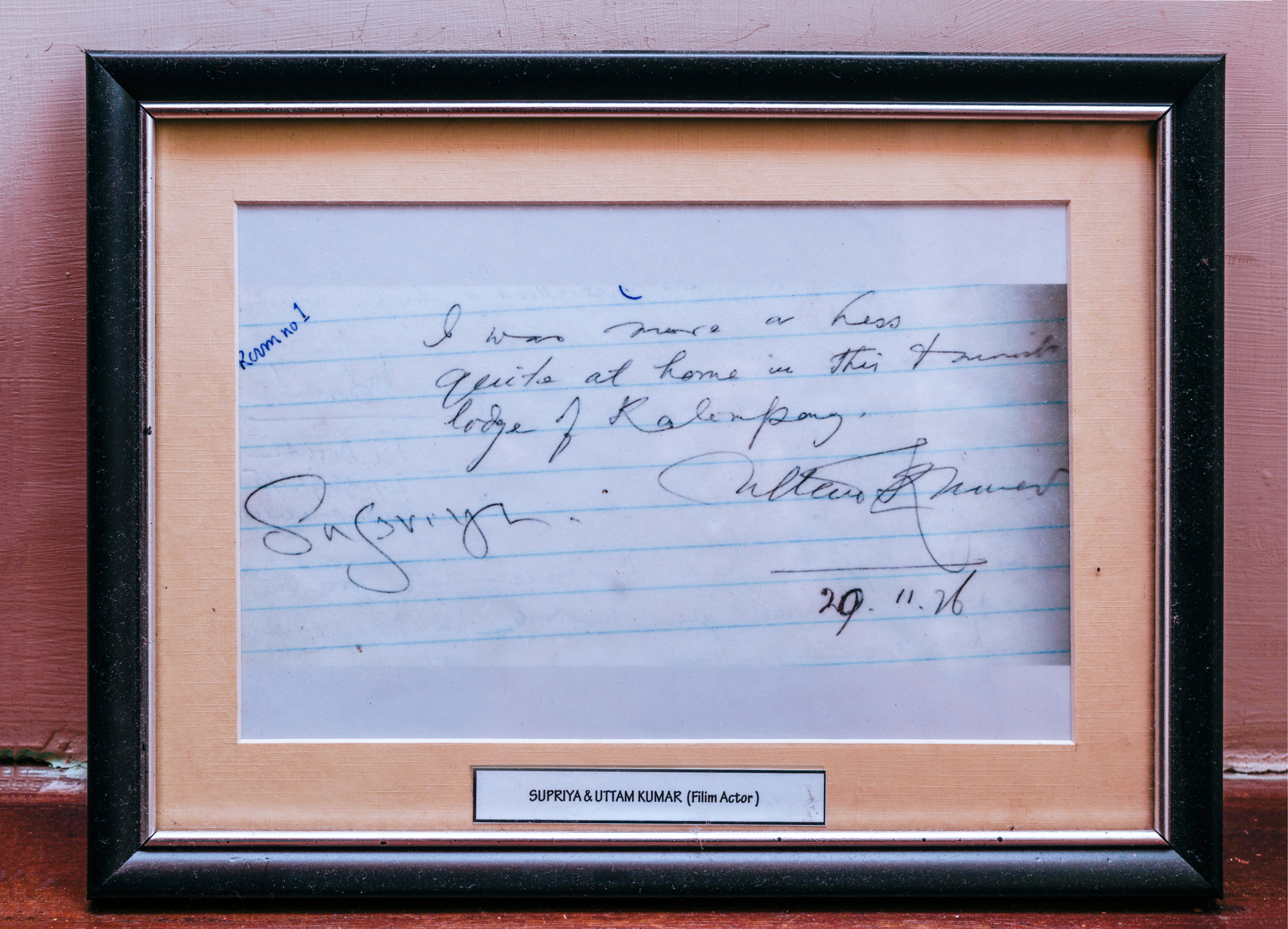
Morgan House, Kalimpong Testimonial of Uttam Kumar and Supriya Devi.

He engaged in a relationship with the legendary actress Supriya Devi, and on 2 December 1963 they got married. He didn't give divorce to his wife, Gauri.

Many fans were inquisitive about the relationship between Uttam and Suchitra and thought they were together. Rumours arose that they were the reason Kumar had a divorce; however, there is no truth in that, they were both married and had families, and were respectful of each other as colleagues.

His grandson Gourab Chatterjee and his brother's grandson Sourav Banerjee are both actors.

Kumar started his autobiography in 1960–61 as Harano Dinguli Mor, which is incomplete. Later in 1979–80 he again began his autobiography as Aamar Ami, but that was also incomplete due to his sudden death. Later Tarun Kumar finished it, but the original manuscript was stolen on the day Uttam died. Later, a member of The Times of India found it and published it in Kolkata Book Fair 2010.

== Illness and death ==
On 23 July 1980, he fell ill on the set of Ogo Badhu Sundori. Later that night, while attending his friend's party, he fell severely ill at around midnight. This time, suspecting an attack, he drove himself to Belle Vue Clinic, which was a five-minute drive from his Moira Street residence. At 3:00 am, he was admitted and attended by a medical board composed of eminent cardiologists. He died at 21:35 in the evening of Thursday, 24 July 1980, aged 53. The next day, on 25 July, millions of people gathered on the streets for his last rites and an entire forest became chopped down. Bengali daily newspaper Anandabazar Patrika carried two reports of Uttam's death. The headline of one was brief: Cholochitre Indrapatan, which translates to Cinema Loses Its Titan.

== Awards and recognition ==
National Film Award

- 1957: Certificate of Merit for Third Best Feature Film In Bengali - Harano Sur (As producer)
- 1961: Certificate of Merit for Second Best Feature Film in Bengali – Saptapadi (As producer)
- 1963: National Film Award for Best Feature Film in Bengali – Uttar Falguni (As producer)
- 1963: National Film Award Third Best Feature Film In Bengali - Jatugriha (As producer)
- 1967: National Award for Best Actor - Antony Firingee, Chiriyakhana

Bengal Film Journalists Association Award (BFJA)

- 1955: BFJA Award for Best Actor - Hrad
- 1962: BFJA Award for Best Actor - Saptapadi
- 1967: BFJA Award for Best Actor - Nayak
- 1968: BFJA Award for Best Actor - Grihadaha
- 1972: BFJA Award for Best Actor - Ekhane Pinjar
- 1973: BFJA Award for Best Actor - Stree
- 1975: BFJA Award for Best Actor - Amanush
- 1976: BFJA Award for Best Actor - Banhisikha

Filmfare Awards

- 1976: Filmfare Best Actor - Amanush (Nominated)
- 1976: Filmfare Special Award - Amanush

Filmfare Award East

- 1975: Best Actor Award - Amanush 1974
- 1978: Best Actor Award - Dhanraj Tamang 1978

== Legacy and influence ==
Kumar is regarded as one the greatest actors in Bengali Cinema. He dominated Bengali film industry throughout the 50s, 60s and 70s. He is known for his diverse roles and charm. Although he is famously known as a romantic lead but he did various types of roles which proved his versatility. Times Now referred Kumar "The First and Last Titan of Bengali Cinema". Satyajit Ray called him "real star" and said, "There was no other actors at his time to match his popularity and most of his films became successful. There was high casting demand from producers because of the profit opportunities." Shantanu Guha Ray of NDTV said, "Uttam Kumar blazed like a meteor and vanished like one." Zee News called him "one-man-institution" and highlighted his classic films. Kumar's performance in Nayak was listed in "25 Greatest Acting Performances of Indian Cinema" by Forbes.

Several notable actors and directors have expressed their admiration to Kumar like Elizabeth Taylor, Dilip Kumar, Vyjayanthimala, Dharmendra, Rajesh Khanna, Shammi Kapoor and Amitabh Bachchan.

Best quotes for Uttam Kumar

- Satyajit Ray - It is the demise of a leading light in the Bengali film industry… There isn’t – there won’t be another hero like him.
- Dilip Kumar - Uttam was the best of our entire lot. A truly clean person.
- Amitabh Bachchan - Uttam Kumar is the original guru. The great actor.
- Raj Kapoor - The smart, modern hero of India.
- Soumitra Chatterjee - If Uttam Kumar committed a crime and then he gave that smile, I was ready to believe he was innocent.
- Vyjainthimala - He was very quiet, and very courteous, lost mostly in his own world.
- Rajesh Khanna - I have watched so many dhuti, kurta-clad Bengalees both on-screen and in reality. But Uttam Kumar as the Bangali Babu is unique. What I believe is that there is no one who can ever represent the Bengali community like Uttamda did.
- Dharmendra - Uttam Kumar is my one of the idol.
- Suchitra Sen - Uttam is my friend. In a word, he is a great, great artist. But still, sometimes I feel as if he is not properly exploited.
- Tapan Sinha - I personally felt that the acting of Uttam Kumar could be compared to the best actor of any country. His great attribute is his diligence. Many are born with talent, but the talent gets eclipsed due to the lack of diligence. Uttam Kumar has both of them. Perhaps that’s the reason why he still sparkles.
- Prosenjit Chatterjee - Uttam jethu was like a family, like an elder brother to my father. The larger than life aura of the man we have never seen when he used to come to our home during those hour long adda sessions. During my teenage days when the entire Bengal could die to get his one glimpse, I was lucky enough to get cuddled by the great personality.
- Bimal Mitra - Sri Uttam Kumar not merely the actor, I regard him as the creator of the character. Maybe as the creator of the character, he has achieved such stupendous popularity.
- Ashutosh Mukhopadhyay - He is the great hero and life of many of my fictions.

== Tributes and honours ==
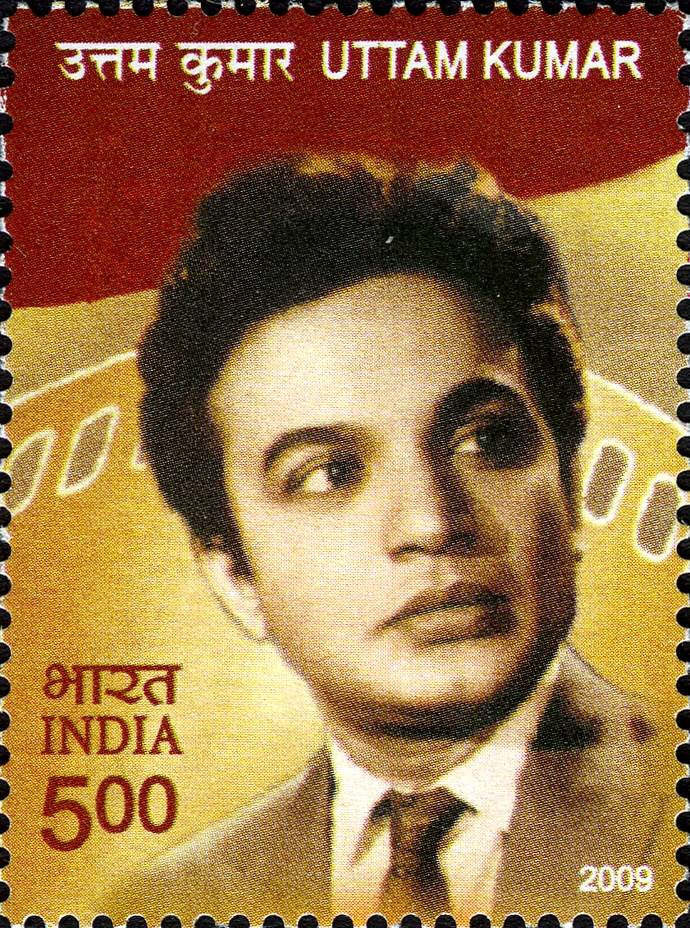
Uttam Kumar in 2009 stamp of India.

In 1973, the iconic Bengali film Basanta Bilap actor Chinmoy Ray said a dialogue which was Ekbar bolo Uttam Kumar (Say one time Uttam Kumar). In 2009, Chinmoy Ray directed a film named Ekbar Bolo Uttam Kumar to tribute him. In 2010, Ogo Badhu Sundori (bearing the same name as the 1981 film) was made, which, directed by Sunanda Mitra, also gave tribute to Kumar. In the same year, the iconic Bengali film Autograph directed by Srijit Mukherjee there was a tribute to both Kumar and Satyajit Ray. Later in many films of Srijit, he give tribute to Kumar.

In 2009, the Tollygunge Metro station in Kolkata was renamed as Mahanayak Uttam Kumar Metro Station in his honour. A life-size statue of Kumar has been erected near the station.

The Department of Post released a postage stamp featuring the actor on 3 September 2009, celebrating the 83rd anniversary of his birth. There is a statue of Uttam Kumar in Tollygunge established in 1993 by the Government of West Bengal. In 2019 at Ahiritola street the birthplace of Kumar another statue was established which inaugurated by the mayor of Kolkata Firhad Hakim. In 2020, on his 94th birth anniversary another statue was situated at Bardhaman town.

In 2012, on his death anniversary, the Government of West Bengal created the Mahanayak Samman Award, named after Kumar, for lifetime achievement in films. This award was first distributed by Chief Minister Mamata Banerjee. This program is held on Uttam Mancha every year on his death anniversary. In Kalighat of Kolkata there is an auditorium named on Uttam Kumar as Uttam Mancha. On 25 November 2019, in London, there was a cultural festival held about Uttam Kumar at London auditorium by the Bengalis.

== In popular culture ==
- In 2016, a television series based on Kumar's life made named Mahanayak where Bengali actor Prosenjit Chatterjee portrayed Kumar.
- In 2019, Mahalaya where actor Jishu Sengupta featured. The film based on his radio controversial Mahalaya incident which was better known as the Mahisasurmardini happened in 1976.
- In 2022, a biopic of Kumar made named as Achena Uttam, starred the Bengali actor Saswata Chatterjee.
- The 2024 film Oti Uttam, directed by Srijit Mukherjee, featured Kumar through VFX, using footage of 54 of his films and which marked Kumar returns on silver screen after 37 years. The film was a hit at the box office.

== Birth centenary celebration ==
The birth centenary of legendary Bengali actor Uttam Kumar (Mahanayak) was officially commemorated with grand celebrations starting September 3, 2026, marking 100 years since his birth on September 3, 1926. Prime Minister Sri Narendra Modi paid tribute to Kumar on his birth centenary, remembering the superstar whose work continues to resonate across generations.
