= Chowringhee (film) =

1968 Indian Bengali film

- Directed by: Pinaki Bhushan Mukherjee
- Written by: Mani Shankar Mukherjee
- Screenplay by: Amal Sarkar
- Based on: Chowringhee by Sankar
- Produced by: Ashima Bhattachariya
- Starring: Uttam Kumar; Supriya Devi; Utpal Dutta; Biswajit Chattopadhyay; Subhendu Chattopadhyay; Anjana Bhowmick
- Cinematography: Dinen Gupta
- Edited by: Kali Raha
- Music by: Ashima Bhattacharjee; Rabindranath Tagore
- Production company: Pompy Films
- Distributed by: Pompy Films
- Release date: 30 September 1968
- Running time: 141 minutes
- Country: India
- Language: Bengali

Chowringhee is a 1968 Indian Bengali drama film by Pinaki Bhushan Mukherjee, starring Uttam Kumar and Subhendu Chatterjee who played the lead role and Biswajit Chatterjee, Supriya Devi and Anjana Bhowmick in supporting role. The music of the film was composed by Ashima Bhattachariya who also produced this film. The film is based on a Bengal novel of the same name by Sankar.

== Plot ==
The movie revolves around the experiences of the characters the author Shankar meets while working at one of the largest and most reputed hotels of Kolkata, Hotel Shahjahan. At the end of the movie, most of the characters experience tragedy, in one form or another.

The major characters Shankar encounters with are:

- Mr. Satyasundar (Sata) Bose is Shankar's co-worker and the receptionist at the hotel. Mr. Bose, played by Uttam Kumar, is shown to be extremely friendly, benevolent and loved by all. Being an efficient worker, he takes care of all the guests very well, including guarding their secrets, and earns the respect and admiration of his boss, Marco Polo (played by Utpal Dutt). He and Ms. Sujata Mitra (played by Anjana Bhowmick), an air hostess who visits the hotel frequently, become close they decide to marry. Sata resigns from his profession as a receptionist in search for a better life after their wedding. Sujata too decides to resign from her work since married women can no longer be employed as air hostesses. Unfortunately, just as she was about to take her last flight as an air hostess, she meets with a tragic air crash while take off that leads to her death. Her death leaves Sata bereaved and unable to live with the fond memories of the past, he leaves Kolkata and goes to Africa where his former boss, Mr. Marco Polo has opened a new hotel and is more than willing to have him as his old fond worker. Thereafter, the fate of Sata Bose remains unknown.
- Ms. Karabi Guha, played by Supriya Devi, is a housekeeper and hostess at the guest house owned by Mr. Aggarwal who is apparently a friend of the Pakrashis (see below). She takes a leading role in helping close an important deal with the German businessmen who are visiting Kolkata. When she learns of the plot of Mrs. Pakrashi's (see below) brother in jeopardizing the business agreement, she alerts Anindya Pakrashi. Eventually, Anindya and Karabi fall in love. However, when Mrs. Pakrashi learns this, she insults Karabi and warns her to leave Anindya in exchange for money. Eventually, in the middle of an intense altercation, Karabi shows the pictures of Mrs. Pakrashi with her boyfriends. This leaves Mrs. Pakrashi stunned and agrees to let Karabi marry Anindya. However, later, thinking about this incident, Karabi feels an intense sense of guilt for her actions. Unable to confront with her feelings, she decides to end her life.
- Anindya Pakrashi, played by Biswajit is the son of a renowned business personality of Kolkata, Mr. Madhab Pakrashi. He is shown to be as well mannered, humble and friendly. After returning from the West, Madhab Pakrashi entrusts him with dealing with the German businessmen. In his effort, Anindya finds Karabi to be extremely helpful. Eventually, Karabi and Anindya fall in love. When unable to confront with her feelings, Karabi kills herself, it leaves him heart-broken and dumbfounded. The fate of Anindya Pakrashi remains unclear after this incident.
- Madhab Pakrashi is a renowned business man of Kolkata. Remaining busy and out of town most of the time, he is unaware of his wife's infidelity. His only son, Anindya is educated abroad. When his son returns to Kolkata, he entrusts Anindya with dealing with the German businessmen.
- Mrs. Pakrashi, wife of the renowned businessman Madhab Pakrasi leads a double life. In the morning, she devotes herself to social work appearing as a perfect Bengali woman. At night, she visits the hotel in disguise and spends nights with her then boyfriend. As per Sata Bose, she engages in short term sexual relationships with different men at different times. Apparently, as shown in the movie, only Sata Bose, Shankar and Karabi know about her infidelity and double life.
- Sujata Mitra, played by Anjana Bhowmick, is an air hostess by profession. Her family lives in Mumbai. As an air hostess, she spends her nights serving the passengers on board and lives at the hotels in the various cities where her work takes her. Sata finds her simple minded, smart and attractive and falls in love with her. She too commits to Sata and buys him a new apartment where they would spend their life together once married. Unfortunately, on her last flight as an air hostess, before leaving her profession, her plane has an accident and she dies. This accident leaves Sata bereaved and heart-broken.

== Cast ==
- Uttam Kumar as Mr. Satyasundar Bose (Sata)
- Subhendu Chatterjee as Shankar
- Supriya Devi as Ms. Karabi Guha
- Biswajit Chatterjee as Anindya Pakrashi
- Anjana Bhowmick as Ms. Sujata Mitra
- Utpal Dutt as Marco Polo
- Bhanu Bandopadhyay as Nityahari Babu
- Haradhan Banerjee as Jimmy
- Sukhen Das as Gurberia
- Bankim Ghosh as Mr. Agarwal
- Jahor Roy as Mr. Juno
- Prasad Mukhopadhyay as Mr. Madhab Pakrashi
- Deepti Roy as Mrs. Pakrashi

== Soundtrack ==
Chowringhee

Soundtrack album by Ashima Bhattachariya
- Released: 1968
- Recorded: 1967
- Studio: Pompy Films
- Genre: Feature film soundtrack
- Length: 0:10:15
- Label: Angel Digital Pvt Ltd
- Producer: Ashima Bhattachariya

Ashima Bhattachariya chronology
Chowringhee (1968)	Memsaheb (1972)

All lyrics are written by Rabindranath Tagore and Miltu Ghosh; all music is composed by Ashima Bhattachariya and Rabindranath Tagore. Every song became hugely popular and contributed a lot to the film's success.

Songs
No.	Title	Playback	Length
1.	"Baro Eka Lage"	Manna Dey	3:37
2.	"Ei Kothati Mone Rekho"	Pratima Banerjee	3:27
3.	"Kache Robe"	Hemanta Mukherjee	3:11
Total length:			10:15

== Production ==
The film is based on Mani Shankar Mukherjee's most selling novel Chowronghee. Pinaki Bhusan Mukherjee directed the film, with music composed and also produced by Ashima Bhattachariya.

Production started during late 1967 and early 1968. The film was shot in the Grand Hotel and Technicians Studio. There are two protagonists — Sata Bose, the character played by Uttam Kumar, and a writer, Shankar, played by Subhendu Chatterjee. Subhendu had scheduling problems in the early days of production as he was attending in the Frankfurt Festival for his film Panchashwaar, which caused filming to be delayed by a few days.

The plot of the film is set in the 1950s. The character of Sata Bose is inspired from two real people — Satya Charan Bose, who was an officer of Eastern Railway, and a hotelier of the Spencas hotel. Both people had an attitude likened to foreigners, unlike common Bengali people of the era.

== Reception ==
The film was hugely popular and received critical acclaim similar to the novel it was based on, but did not receive any awards. Uttam Kumar too did not get any awards despite his outstanding performance in the film. The film has earned cult status in Bengal.

The song Baro Eka Lage, sung by Manna Dey and picturized by Uttam Kumar, became a chartbuster and is very popular even today.

Released on the occasion of Durga puja in 1968, the film ran to full houses for 112 days and overall for 150 days in theaters. The film was a blockbuster and the highest grossing Bengali film in 1968.

== Awards ==
Bengal Film Journalists Association Award 1969

- 1969 : Bengal Film Journalists Association - Best Female Playback Singer Award - Pratima Banerjee

Srijit Mukherjee made a film based on this same story in 2019, Shahjahan Regency.

== Legacy ==
The film become cult hit like novel. The novel is adapted later in many languages. The film become still popular in today's audience.

Uttam Kumar performance the main highlight of the film and regarded one of the best. Author Shankar was said that in an interview When Uttam Kumar, sitting beside me, asked me about my views after the first show, I said ‘You have made your portrayal even more attractive than the Sata Bose I developed’. He immediately asked, ‘Will you write it down for me?’. I said, ‘Even if I don’t, the public won’t wait for my views’. He asked me what’s so special about Sata Bose. I said ‘There are a few people who win hearts by not doing much like Sata Bose and film industry has quite a few such personalities.
