= Gokhale Memorial Girls' College =

Women's undergraduate college in Kolkata, India

- Type: Undergraduate college
- Established: 1938; 88 years ago
- Academic affiliations: University of Calcutta
- Principal: Dr. Atashi Karpha
- Faculty: 50 approx
- Administrative staff: 35 approx
- Students: 500 approx
- Location: 1/1, Harish Mukherjee Rd, Gokhel Road, Bhowanipore, Kolkata, West Bengal 700020, India; 22.246316°N 88.3732992°E
- Campus: Urban
- Website: Gokhale Memorial Girls' College
- Location within West Bengal Location within India

Gokhale Memorial Girls' College is a women's college in South Kolkata, established in 1938. The college offers undergraduate degrees and is affiliated with the University of Calcutta. The name commemorates Gopal Krishna Gokhale, one of the founding social and political figures of the Indian Independence Movement.

== Departments ==
=== Science ===
- Mathematics
- Chemistry
- Physics
- Psychology
- Clinical Nutrition and Dietetics

=== Arts ===
- Bengali
- English
- Sanskrit
- Hindi
- History
- Geography
- Political Science
- Philosophy
- Education
- Communicative English

=== Commerce ===
- Economics
- Advertising sales promotion and sales management(major)

== Library ==
The College Central Library is well-equipped and well stocked. It has over twenty eight thousand collections of printed books and e books. Library subscribes five magazines and two peer review journals for undergraduate students.

== Accreditation ==
Gokhale Memorial Girls' College is recognized by the University Grants Commission (UGC). Recently, it has been re-accredited and awarded A grade by the National Assessment and Accreditation Council (NAAC).

== Notable alumni ==
- Mamata Shankar, dancer and actress
- Dona Ganguly, dancer
- Indrani Sen, singer
- Srabani Sen, singer
- Koel Mallick, actress and Member of Rajya Sabha
- Basabdatta Chatterjee, actress
- Chaiti Ghoshal, actress
- Nabaneeta Dev Sen, writer and academic
- Jasodhara Bagchi, writer and academic
- Ratnaboli Ray, psychologist
- Samapti Chatterjee, retired Judge of Calcutta High Court

== See also ==
- List of colleges affiliated to the University of Calcutta
- Education in India
- Education in West Bengal
