= Rajodrohi =

1966 Bengali action-adventure film by Niren Lahiri

- Theatrical poster
- Directed by: Niren Lahiri
- Based on: Rajodrohi by Saradindu Bandyopadhyay
- Screenplay by: Kunal Mukherjee; Additional screenplay: Dr. Biswanath Roy
- Dialogues by: Dr. Biswanath Roy
- Story by: Saradindu Bandyopadhyay
- Produced by: B. K. Ahuja
- Starring: Uttam Kumar; Anjana Bhowmick; Bikash Roy; Anup Kumar
- Cinematography: Bijoy Ghosh
- Edited by: Ardhendu Chatterjee
- Music by: Ali Akbar Khan
- Production company: B. K. Productions
- Distributed by: Chitrali Film Distributors
- Release date: 25 March 1966
- Country: India
- Language: Bengali

Rajodrohi (Bengali pronunciation: [rad͡ʒd̪rohi] transl. The Royal Rebel) is a 1966 Indian Bengali-language vigilante action film directed by Niren Lahiri. Produced by B. K. Ahuja under the banner of B. K. Productions, it stars Uttam Kumar and Anjana Bhowmick in lead roles, alongside Bikash Roy, Kamal Mitra, Anup Kumar, Dilip Roy and Tarun Kumar in another pivotal roles. The film portrays a farmer who transforms into a vigilante to take revenge from his mother's assassins.

Based on the 1961 novel of the same name by Sharadindu Bandyopadhyay, the film also draws inspirations from the fictional tales of Robin Hood and Zorro. It marks the sixth collaboration between Lahiri and Kumar, and also pairs Kumar and Bhowmick for the first time. Music of the film is composed by Ali Akbar Khan, with lyrics penned by Gauriprasanna Mazumder. Bijoy Ghosh handled its cinematography and Ardhendu Chatterjee edited the film.

Rajodrohi was theatrically released on 25 March 1966, opening to huge commercial response. The film renamed Kumar as "The Robin Hood of Bengal", which later went on to be used in his several films. Emerged as one of the highest-grossing Bengali films of 1966, it acquired a cult status in Bengali cinema.

== Plot ==
A simple village person Pratap accidentally became a revolutionary. Many years ago Pratap lived in a village. He was happy with his mother and his girl friend Chinta. He was a farmer. Gokuldas was a corrupt money lender of that village. His assistant Kantilal was a dangerous man. They acquired all of Pratap's wealth, house unlawfully. Then, they tried to throw out Pratap from his house. Pratap protested against this. But his mother was shot down by Kantilal. Pratap reported against Gokuldas to the King. But the King ignored his appeal because, he also get money from Gokuldas. Pratap wanted to take revenge. He snatched wealth of Gokul and flew away to the forest. His friends supported him and joined with him. But at last King's army Chief Tej Singh was able to convince the King. The King realised his faults and withdrew all allegation against Pratap. But it was too late. Kantilal killed Chinta. Pratap became free but lonely in the end.

== Cast ==
- Uttam Kumar as Pratap
- Anjana Bhowmick as Chinta
- Bikash Roy as Seth Gokuldas
- Anup Kumar as Bheem
- Kamal Mitra as Tej Singh
- Tarun Kumar as Lakshman
- Dilip Roy as Raghu
- Jiben Bose
- Niranjan Roy as Kantilal
- Mani Srimani
- Prashanta Kumar
- Sabita Chatterjee

== Production ==
Following the success of Jhinder Bondi (1961), Tapan Sinha decided to direct the screen adaptation of Saradindu Bandyopadhyay's novel Rajodrohi with Uttam Kumar in 1962. Bholanath Roy of B. N. Roy Productions, who gave their consent to produce the film, left the project due to its high-production costs, which also caused Sinha's opt out of it. Then he collaborated with Kumar on Jatugriha in 1964.

In 1965, Niren Lahiri revived the project with B. K. Ahuja as producer. Kunal Mukherjee and Dr. Biswanath Roy came on board in charge of screenplay and dialogues. Mukherjee developed the protagonist with characteristic references from Robin Hood and Zorro, felicitating The Mark of Zorro (1940) and Sword of Sherwood Forest (1960). Lahiri narrated the script to Kumar, who signed the film and also decided to co-produce it. Anjana Bhowmick also joined the project the same year, pairing up with Kumar for the first time, despite having starred in Thana Theke Aschhi (1965).

== Music ==
Rajodrohi

Soundtrack album to Rajodrohi by Ali Akbar Khan
- Released: 1966
- Genre: Feature Film Soundtrack
- Length: 8:52
- Language: Bengali
- Label: Saregama
- Producer: Ali Akbar Khan

Ali Akbar Khan chronology
| Nyay Danda (1963) | Rajodrohi (1966) | The Blind Owl (1975) |
External audio
- Rajodrohi Audio Jukebox on YouTube

Music of the film is composed by Ali Akbar Khan in his second collaboration with Kumar after Jhinder Bondi (1961). The soundtrack consists of four tracks, each penned by Gauriprasanna Mazumder.

Track listing
| No. | Title | Singer(s) | Length |
|---|---|---|---|
| 1. | "Tumi Kachhe Ele Naa To" | Sandhya Mukherjee | 3:16 |
| 2. | "Mon Dile Mon Nite Hoy" | Pratima Bandopadhyay | 3:31 |
| 3. | "Akashe Chander Alo" | Pratima Bandopadhyay | 2:36 |
| 4. | "Kothao Amar Nei Somoy Thamar" | Shyamal Mitra | 2:45 |
| Total length: | | | 12:08 |

== Release ==
The film was released on 25 March 1966 in theatres. Bengali magazine Ultorath in its review dated 29 March 1966 mentioned that the film "has several amazing moments which increase the heartbeats of the audience... Various fight scenes, dances and comedy scenes make the film a mass entertainer".
