= Mahisasuramardini (radio programme) =

Special dawn radio programme of All India Radio

Mahishasuramardini
- Other names: Chandipath; Mahalaya
- Genre: Religious
- Running time: 1 hr 29 mins
- Country of origin: India
- Languages: Bengali, Sanskrit
- Home station: Akashvani
- Written by: Bani Kumar – Script-Writing; Pankaj Mullick – Music Composition; Birendra Krishna Bhadra – Narration and Recitation of Scriptures
- Narrated by: Birendra Krishna Bhadra
- Original release: 1931
- Opening theme: Conch blowing sound and Ya Chandi Song
- Ending theme: Shanti Dile Bhori song and Conch blowing sound

Mahishasuramarddini (Note: Sanskrit pronunciation: [mɐ.ɦi.ʂaː.su.rɐ.mɐrd̪.d̪i.niː], Bengali: মহিষাসুরমর্দ্দিনী, romanized: Môhiṣāsurômôrddinī, lit. 'The Annihilator of Mahishasura', Bengali pronunciation: [mɔ.ɦi.ʃa.ʃur.mor.d̪i.ni]) is a widely popular early Bengali special dawn radio programme that has been broadcasting since 1931 on All India Radio (AIR) in Indian state West Bengal. Due to its increasing popularity, now-a-days it is also broadcast by many other stations of All India Radio across India. It is a one-and-a-half-hour audio montage of Chaṇḍipāaṭh (chanting from Chaṇḍi) recitation from the scriptural verses of Śrī Śrī Chaṇḍi or Durga Saptashati, Bengali devotional songs, classical music and a dash of acoustic melodrama. The program has been translated into Hindi set to similar orchestration and is broadcast at the same time for a pan-Indian audience. This programme is aired every year at day-break on Mahalaya. The programme, which started off as a live-performance, has been broadcast in its pre-recorded format since 1966. However, its great popularity remains undiminished even today over 95 years later.

This program has become synonymous with Mahalaya which is celebrated to usher the Devipaksha lunar fortnight and the Durga Puja. To this day, most of Bengal and East India fond of the programme wakes up in the breezily pre dawn hours, 4 am to be precise, on the Mahalaya day to tune into the Mahishasuramarddini broadcast. Presently, one of the recordings are available as audio cassettes and Compact Disks from His Master's Voice-RPG which has obtained the rights from All India Radio. The CD version (as of 2002) contains 19 tracks.

== Birendra Krishna Bhadra ==
Birendra Krishna Bhadra, who will always be remembered for making Mahalaya memorable to one and all, is the voice behind the "Mahisasura Mardini." He recites the holy verses and tells the story of the descent of Durga to earth. It was on the day of Mahalaya, the beginning of "Devipaksha", that the gods and goddesses woke up to prepare themselves for Durga Puja. In 1931, Mahalaya was first broadcast over the radio in Akashvani, Calcutta. The programme was organised by Pankaj Kumar Mallik, Premankur Aatorthi, Birendra Krishna Bhadra, Nripendra Krishna Mukhopadhyay and Raichand Boral.

So popular was his version of the recitation that when in 1976, the voice of noted Bengali actor, Uttam Kumar was employed for the programme and renamed it as Durga Durgatiharini did not get favorable response from the audience and it was shifted back to the original version of Birendra Krishna Bhadra.

I have heard Birendra Krishna Bhadra’s Mahalaya recital times. Birendra Krishna Bhadra’s Mahalaya recital is a cultural tradition, among Bengali communities. Every family listens to Birendra Krishna Bhadra’s Mahalaya recital before Durga Puja. The recording remains a part of the annual celebrations and continues to connect generations.

== Musical composition ==
Though the theme is theological and the mantras Vedic, this program is a landmark composition. It is scripted by Bani Kumar, and narrated by Birendra Krishna Bhadra while Pratima Bandopadhyay (Amala Kirane), Dwijen Mukhopadhyay (Jago Durga Jago Doshoprohoronodharini), Manabendra Mukhopadhyay (Tabo Achinta), Sandhya Mukhopadhyay, Arati Mukhopadhyay, Utpala Sen, Shyamal Mitra and Supriti Ghosh (Bajlo tomar alor benu) sang in their melodious voices. The enchanting music is composed by Pankaj Mullick. The songs/chants in the order they appear in the programme are as follows:

Seq#	Singer	Song	English transliteration
1	Chorus	যা চণ্ডী	Ya Chandi
2	Chorus	সিংহস্হা শশীশেখরা	Simhastha Sashisekhara
3	Supriti Ghosh	বাজলো তোমার আলোর বেনু	Bajlo Tomar Alor Benu
4	Dwijen Mukhopadhyay	জাগো তুমি জাগো	Jago Tumi Jago
5	Shipra Bose	ওগো আমার আগমনী আলো	Ogo amar agomoni
6	Manabendra Mukhopadhyay	তব অচিন্ত্য	Tabo Achintya
7	Chorus	অহম্ রূদ্রে ভির্বসুভিশ্চরাম্যহম্	Aham Rudrebhirvasubhischara
8	Krishna Dasgupta	অখিল বিমানে তব জয়গানে	Akhilo Bimane Tabo Jayagaane
9	Chorus		Jayanti Mangala Kali
10	Shyamal Mitra/ Arati Mukherjee/ Ashima Bhattacharya	শুভ্র শঙ্খ রবে	Subhro Sankha Robe
11	Chorus		Jatajutasamayuktamardhendukrita-Sekharam
12	Bimal Bhushan	নমো চন্ডী নমো চন্ডী	Namo Chandi Namo Chandi
13	Sumitra Sen	মাগো তব বিনে	Mago Tabo Bine
14	Sandhya Mukhopadhyay	বিমানে বিমানে আলোকের গানে	Bimane Bimane Aloker Gaane
15	Chorus	জয় জয় হে মহিষাসুর মর্দ্দিনী	Jaya Jaya He Mahishashur Mardini
16	Tarun Bandopadhyay	হে চিন্ময়ী	Hey Chinmoyi
17	Pratima Bandopadhyay	অমল কিরনে	Amala Kirane
18	Pankaj Kumar Mullick, Chorus	রুপং দেহী জয়ং দেহী	Rupam Dehi Jayam Dehi
19	Utpala Sen	শান্তি দিলে ভরি	Shanti Dile Bhaari

As the recital begins, the serene morning air resonates with the long drawn sound of the sacred conch shell, followed by a tune in Raga Malkosh, which ultimately leads to the start of the programme with the prayer to Goddess Chandi. Immediately an atmosphere is created full of assurance, respect and universal love and peace. This way, Mahisasurmardini took a permanent place in the heart of Bengali as well as Indian culture.

=== Artists ===
==== Main artists ====
- Bani Kumar - script writing
- Pankaj Mullick - music composition
- Birendra Krishna Bhadra - narration and recitation of scriptures

==== Singers ====
- Dwijen Mukhopadhyay (Jago Tumi Jago, Jago Durga, Jago Dashoprohoronadharini)
- Pratima Bandopadhyay (Amala Kirane)
- Shyamal Mitra (Subhro Sankha Robe)
- Sandhya Mukhopadhyay (Bimane Bimane Aloker Gaane)
- Manabendra Mukhopadhyay (Tabo Achintya)
- Arati Mukhopadhyay (Subhro Sankha Robe)
- Supriti Ghosh (Bajlo Tomar Alor Benu)
- Pankaj Kumar Mullick (Jayanti Mangala Kali & Aham Rudrebhirvasubhischara)
- Utpala Sen (Shanti Dile Bhori)
- Tarun Bandopadhyay (Hey Chinmoyi)
- Krishna Dasgupta (Akhilo Bimane Tabo Jayagaane)
- Sumitra Sen (Mago Tabo Bine)
- Ashima Bhattacharya (Subhro Sankha Robe)
- Shipra Bose (Ogo amar agomoni)
- Bimal Bhushan (Namo Chandi Namo Chandi)
- Dhananjay Bhattacharya (Rupang Dehi, Jayang Dehi)
- Haimanti Shukla (Aham Rudrebhirvasubhischara, Jago Dashoprohoronadharini)

==== Musicians (instrumental) ====
- Bibekendra Deb Roy - Violin
- Aloke Nath Dey - Flute
- Kamal Mallick - Sarode
