= Bhalobasa Bhalobasa (1985 film) =

1985 film by Tarun Majumdar

Bhalobasa Bhalobasa ভালবাসা ভালবাসা
- DVD cover
- Directed by: Tarun Majumdar
- Written by: Tarun Majumdar
- Produced by: Manisha Sarkar
- Starring: Tapas Paul; Debashree Roy
- Cinematography: Shakti Banerjee
- Music by: Hemanta Mukherjee
- Release date: 23 January 1985
- Running time: 120 minutes
- Country: India
- Language: Bengali

Bhalobasa Bhalobasa (Bengali: ভালবাসা ভালবাসা) is a 1985 Bengali romantic film directed by Tarun Majumdar. The film stars Tapas Paul and Debashree Roy. highest-grossing Indian Bengali films of 1985.

== Plot ==
Keya is a college student who also goes for music classes in Kolkata. She stays in a girls' hostel whereas Keya's parents and cousin stay in Shimultala (Bihar). Arup is a small business man dealing in poultry and also helps poor people with free medicine and education. His mother was a noted singer who had recently died from cancer. His father had left his mother for another rich woman when she was expecting Arup. Keya has a fight with Arup when he comes to her hostel to supply poultry. Later Keya discovers that Arup is also a gifted singer like his mother and Keya and Arup fall in love with each other. Keya starts visiting Arup's house and helps him in his work. Arup is approached by Keya on behalf of the Gramophone Company for recording Rabindra sangeet but Arup does not agree for some unknown reason and instead throws out Keya from his house. Later, he repents for his mistake and starts singing. The couple eventually sorts their differences. When Keya goes to Shimultala on Durga Puja vacation, Arup follows Keya as per pre-plan. There, they come to know that Keya's father has already fixed up her marriage with an Engineer who is also the son of a rich Barrister from Patna. Arup by his good-nature tries to win the favors of Keya's parents and brother. However, Arup discovers the true identity of the Barrister and his son and at the behest of Keya's mother decides to leave the place without informing Keya. However, before leaving Shimultala he decides to sing his last song at the Bijoya Sammilani. Through the song he narrates the whole sad life of his mother, her lifelong struggle and how he was ill-treated by his father (the Barrister) when Arup had requested his father to come and meet his dying mother. After hearing the song, Arup's father realizes his biggest mistake of life and requests forgiveness from his son. Both the parents decide to get Keya and Arup married to each other and eventually the movie ends with a happy note.

== Cast ==
- Tapas Paul as Arup
- Debashree Roy as Keya
- Ruma Guha Thakurta as Keya's Mother
- Utpal Dutt as Keya's Father
- Anup Kumar as Keya's cousin brother
- Santu Mukhopadhyay as Debu da (Keya's Music Teacher)
- Sumitra Mukherjee as Shobhona Boudi (Debu's wife)
- Madhabi Mukhopadhyay as Pratima (Arup's Mother)
- Satya Bandyopadhyay as Abani (Arup's father)
- Kaushik Banerjee as Animesh (Abani's second son; Keya's fiance)

== Crew ==
- Director: Tarun Majumder
- Producer : Manisha Sarkar
- Presenter :
- Music Director: Hemonto Mukherjee
- Cinematographer: Shakti Banerjee
- Editor : Ramesh Joshi
- Playback Singer :Arundhati Holme Chowdhury, Haimanti Sukla, Hemanta Mukherjee, Santu Mukherjee, Shibaji Chatterjee

== Awards ==
- BFJA Awards (1986)
  - Best Editing- Ramesh Joshi
  - Best Lyrics- Pulak Bandyopadhyay
  - Best Music- Hemanta Mukherjee
  - Best Playback Singer (Female)- Arundhati Holme Chowdhury
  - Best Playback Singer (Male)- Shibaji Chatterjee
