= Biman (disambiguation) =

Biman may refer to:

- Biman Bangladesh Airlines, the national flag carrier of Bangladesh
- Biman, Iran, village in Iran

== Given name ==
- Biman Prasad (born 1961/1961), Fijian politician and economist
- Biman Banerjee (born 1948), Indian politician
- Biman Bose (born 1940), Indian politician
- Biman Ghosh, Indian politician
- Biman Mukhopadhyay (1930–2011), Bengali singer and trainer
- Biman Bagchi (born 1954), Indian scientist
