= Supriti Ghosh =

- Also known as: Paansi
- Born: Supriti Majumdar; 28 August 1922
- Origin: Mirzapur Street, North Kolkata, Bengal (currently West Bengal, India)
- Died: 22 April 2009 (aged 86) Kolkata, West Bengal, India
- Genres: Rabindra Sangeet
- Occupation: Musician
- Years active: 1933-1970

Supriti Ghosh (28 August 1922 – 22 April 2009) was an Indian Bengali female singer. Mahishasuramardini's 'Bajlo Tomar Alor Benu' is still in the minds of most Bengalis through this song with her tunes. Besides, she has given voice to many modern songs and Rabindra Sangeet.

== Early life ==
She was born to Rabindranath Majumdar and Kamala Devi at Mirzapur Street in North Kolkata, British India. She starts singing along with her sister Bharti. She entered the musical life at a very young age and did not deprive the audience of her tunes till late age. During her childhood, she got the opportunity to listen to legendary singers like as Hemant Kumar, Pankaj Mullick, Birendra Krishna Bhadra, Hiren Bose and Raichand Boral at the house of her uncle, popular musician and All India Radio magnate Nripendranath Majumdar. They fascinated by Supriti Ghosh's music every time and inspired her to take a walk into recording studio. As a child, she trained music at Vasanti Vidyavithi under the guidance of Manoranjan Sen. Her music teachers there were Anadi Ghosh Dastidar, Nitai Ghatak, Jagat Ghatak, Shailesh Dutt etc.

== Career ==
After childhood, she became more and more attached to music. After that, she started getting offers to perform songs in films along with public functions. She had given playback in many films. In 1933, at the age of 11, she performed Rabindra Sangeet for the first time on radio. In 1936, after the establishment of Senalo Record Company, her first record was released by that company. One side of the record had poetic music and the other side had kirtan.

She had special interests in all kinds of music. Apart from Rabindra Sangeet, she sang Nazrul Geeti, Atul Prasadi song, Dijendra Geeti, Modern Bengali songs etc. Film director Bimal Roy made her to singing 'Ogo Saathi Mom Saathi' in the film of 'Tathaapi'. However, after participating in Mahisasuramardini, which was broadcast live at the studios of All India Radio, her voice became a household name.

Her voice was quite synonymous with Goddess Durga's well-known bandana song 'Bajlo Tomar Alor Benu'. Through this song, her musical recognition has been greatly developed. Hymns with songs attracted a lot of attention in the Bengalis mainstream.

== See also ==
- Mahisasuramardini (radio programme)
