= Mahalaya (film) =

2019 Bengali Indian film

- Poster
- Directed by: Soumik Sen
- Screenplay by: Soumik Sen
- Produced by: Nideas Creations and Productions Pvt Ltd
- Starring: Subhasish Mukherjee; Jisshu Sengupta; Subhomoy Chatterjee; Prosenjit Chatterjee
- Cinematography: Mrinmoy Nandi
- Edited by: Niladri Roy
- Music by: Debojyoti Mishra
- Production companies: Nideas Creations and Productions Pvt Ltd
- Distributed by: SVF
- Release date: 1 March 2019 (India)
- Running time: 108 mins
- Country: India
- Language: Bengali

Mahalaya is a 2019 Indian Bengali language drama film directed by Soumik Sen and produced by Nideas Creations and Productions Pvt Ltd. The film narrates an incident in Bengal in 1976, when Birendra Krishna Bhadra narrated and Pankaj Mullick composed widely popular Mahisasuramardini program, which had been playing on All India Radio since 1931 on the eve of Mahalaya, was replaced by a new program Durga Durgatiharini, narrated by Bengali film actor Uttam Kumar and composed by Hemanta Mukherjee. Subhasish Mukhopadhyay played the role of Bhadra and Jisshu Sengupta played the role of Uttam Kumar.

The film was released theatrically on 1 March 2019.

== Cast ==
- Subhasish Mukherjee as Birendra Krishna Bhadra
- Jisshu Sengupta as Uttam Kumar
- Saptarshi Ray as Hemanta Mukhopadhyay
- Prosenjit Chatterjee as Shashi Sinha, Former I & B Secretary of India.
- Subhomoy Chatterjee as Pankaj Mullick
- Kanchan Mullick as Paritosh Banerjee, Indian Administrative Service Officer, Former Joint Secretary to the Government of India and husband of Shakuntala Devi
- Jayant Kripalani as Harold Stevenson, former Director-general, Akashbani, Kolkata
- Bhaswar Chatterjee as Anil Bagchi
- Sudipa Basu as Ramarani Devi, wife of Birendra Krishna Bhadra
- Devlina Kumar as daughter of Pankaj Mullick

== Release ==
The official trailer of the film was released by Nideas Creations & Productions on 9 February 2019.

The film was released theatrically on 1 March 2019.
