= Alpana Banerjee =

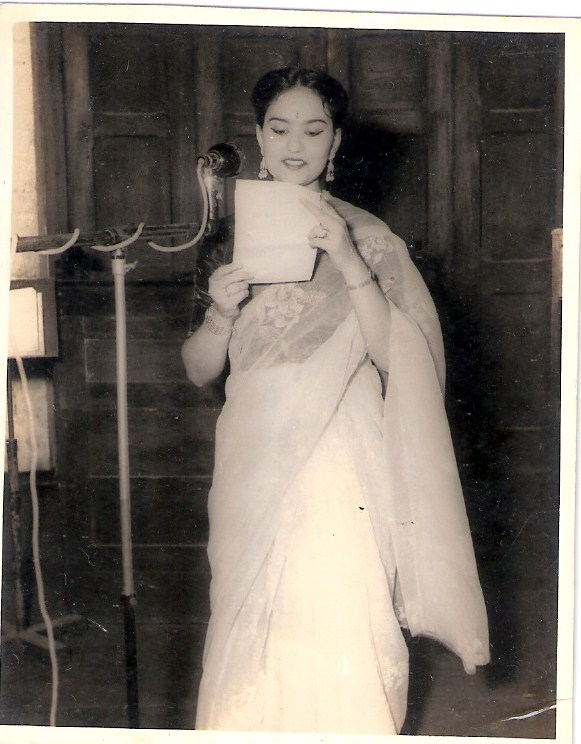

Background information
- Born: Alpana Banerjee; 14 March 1934; Calcutta, Bengal Presidency, British India
- Origin: Kolkata, West Bengal, India
- Died: 24 July 2009 (aged 75) Kolkata, West Bengal, India
- Genres: Indian classical & modern music
- Occupations: playback singer, Harmonium player
- Instrument: harmonium
- Years active: 1948–2009
- Labels: His Master's Voice
- Formerly of: Ali Akbar Khan, Ravi Shankar, Sandhya Mukhopadhyay

Alpana Mukherjee (née Banerjee; Bengali: আল্পনা মুখার্জী) (14 March 1934 – 24 July 2009) was a successful Bengali singer during the late 1940s and 1950s and onwards. Her most noted songs are "Trader Chumki Jole Akashe" "Hatti Matim Tim", "Mon Bolchhe Aaj Sandhyay", "Chotto Pakhi Chandana" and "Ami Alpana Enke Jai Aloy Chhayay" " Akash Ar Eai Mati Oi Dure" " Jodi Oli Na chahe".

== Early life ==
At the age of 13, Alpana was discovered by her father's close friends, Robin Chattopadhyay and Gouri Prasanna Majumdar, who were very active as music composers and lyricists respectively in the Bengali music scene at that time. Her songs became very popular soon after.

== Career ==
Alpana Banerjee's major popularity derived from singing children's songs, which she transformed from simple rhymes to immortal classics. Bengalis from the 1950s through the 1990s were raised on Alpana's classics like 'Hatti Matim Tim' or 'Chhotto Pakhi Chandana'.

Her modern songs received much more popularity. One of the earliest and notable Bengali non-film songs sung by Alpana was "Samiran Phire Chao" under Robin Chattopadhyay's baton. Soon after, in 1951, she recorded the song "Matir Ghare Aaj Nemechhe Chand Re" for the Bengali film 'Vidyasagar' with music once again by Robin Chattopadhay. This song became remarkably popular. Another notable Bengali film song by her, under Robin Chattopadhay's baton yet again, is "Hriday Amar Sundara Taba Paye" from the 1956 film 'Sagarika'. She sang many notable Bengali film and non-film songs in the 1950s under different music composers including Nachiketa Ghosh, Shyamal Mitra, Manabendra Mukhopadhyay, Sailen Mukhopadhyay and Bhupen Hazarika. Her voice was eloquent in capturing a variety of moods ranging from the romantic "Mon Bolchhe Aaj Sandhyay", to the frivolous 'Bakul Gandhe Jodi', 'Ami Alpana Enke Jai' and sombre 'Jetha Achhe Ogo Shudhu Nirabata'.

Alpana recorded a cover version of the Hindi film song 'Albela main ek dilwala' under Sachin Dev Burman's music direction. The regular version of this song was sung by Asha Bhonsle in the 1957 Hindi film 'Miss India'.

Alpana collaborated with many of her colleagues including Utpala Sen, Sandhya Mukhopadhyay, Shyamal Mitra (with whom she sang duets on many occasions), Manabendra Mukhopadhyay, and Hemanta Kumar Mukhopadhyay. She also sang with Lata Mangeshkar under the direction of Pandit Ravi Shankar.

She was often the guest of honour at Bengali music functions, TV programmes, and on AIR (All India Radio) programmes.

On All India Radio'-Calcutta's 'Ramyageeti' program, she sang songs tuned by internationally renowned Sarod player Ali Akbar Khan. She also toured most of the North Indian Radio stations singing in chain programs with All India Radio. She was noted to have given performances in all corners of West Bengal.

Besides touring within India and West Bengal, she also extensively toured in England. She performed at Durga Puja functions in places like Hampstead Town Hall, Belsize Park, King's Cross and gave performances at Bengali communities in Bradford, Leeds, Liverpool, Wolverhampton, West Ham, Seven Sisters, Finsbury Park, Islington, etc. She was interviewed by BBC London on several occasions.

== Personal life ==
Alpana Banerjee was married to Sridhar Mukherjee and resided in Calcutta, West Bengal, India. She got married in 1959 and celebrated her 50th wedding anniversary in 2009. Her daughter lives in Chelsea, London and her son in Mumbai, India. Notable Bengali singer Sandhya Mukhopadhyay remains a close family friend .

== Death ==
Alpana Banerjee died on 24 July 2009 at the age of 75. Many of her contemporary musicians whom she had befriended 50 years back (including Sandhya Mukhopadhyay) visited and paid their last respects. Among those paying their respects were Railway minister Mamata Banerjee and chief minister of West Bengal Buddhadeb Bhattacharjee. Despite not being actively involved in the commercial music scene for many decades, the news of her death was covered by Indian media.

== Playback songs ==
Alpana Banerjee was a playback singer in the following Bengali films:

- Bidyasagar
- Sahodor
- Bidhilipi
- Bhangagara
- Kori o Kamal
- Nouka Bilas
- Shubhada (she received best singer award in 1952 from the above film)
- Satir Dehatyag
- Satir Patalprabesh
- Mathur
- Saat Number Kaedi
- Agnipariksha
- Draupadi
- Dersho Khokar kando
- Kar Papey
- Bhisma
- Nagini Kanyar Kahini (music directed by Pandit Ravi Shankar)
- Hya
- Boudir Bon
- Shilpi
- Lakshya Bhrasta
- Personal Assistant
- Nashtanir
- Manmoyee Girls' School
- Asampta
- Dashyu Mohan
- Maa o Chhele
- Lakshya Heera
- Rakto Sandhya
- Bikram Urbashi
- Chhele Kaar
- Naa
- Pathe Holo Deri
- Ora Thake Odhare
- Sagarika
- Kirtigar
- Chhobi
- Brindaban Lila
- Saheb Bibi Golam
- Sandhyaraag
- Ektara
- Sribatsa Chinta
- Adrishya Manush
- Prashna
- Prithibi Amare Chay

She lent her voice in many more films; the above films contain her most noted songs.

== Recorded songs ==
These are some of her songs recorded with His Master's Voice:

- Mon Bolchhe Aaj Sandhyay
- Ami Alpana Enke Jai
- Bakulgandhe Jodi Batas
- Tarader Chumki Jwale Akashe
- Jodi Tomar Jibane
- Eto Manjari Keno Aaj Phutechhe
- Aabchha Megher Oma Gaaye
- Ogo Tomay Chaowa
- Papiya Keno Aar Piya Dako
- Shiyarer Deep Jodi
- Jetha Aachte Shudhu Nirabata
- Akash Aar Ei Mati
- O Guner Naiyare
- Amar Shyam Shuk Pakhi Go
- Ami Sundar Bole
- Tomar Moner Rang Legechhe
- Chhotto Pakhi Chandana
- Phire Phire Chay Ke Je
- Bolechhile Tumi Gaan Shonabe
- Samiran Phire Chao
- Matir Ghare Aaj Nemechhe Chand
- Hriday Amar Sundar Tabo

== Nursery rhymes ==
These are some of her nursery Rhymes recorded with His Master's Voice.

- Hatti Matim Tim
- Moymar Ma Moynamoti
- Dol Dol Duluni
- Agdum Bagdum Ghoradum
- Jamunaboti Saraswati
- Sajalpurer Kajol Meye
- Khuku Jabe Sashur Bari
- Chhotto Pahki Chandana
- Bideshini Kader Rani
- Chandrakala Baranmala
- Nache Nache Putul Nache
- Otho Otho Surjai
- Charka Kate Buri
- Poushali Sandhya Ghoom Ghoom Tandra
- Kana Machi Bho Bho
- Hoi Hollar Sorgol
- Chat Pot Uthe Paro
- Aye Re Ay Cheler Pal
