= Hattimatim tim (rhyme) =

Bengali nursery rhyme

- by Unknown
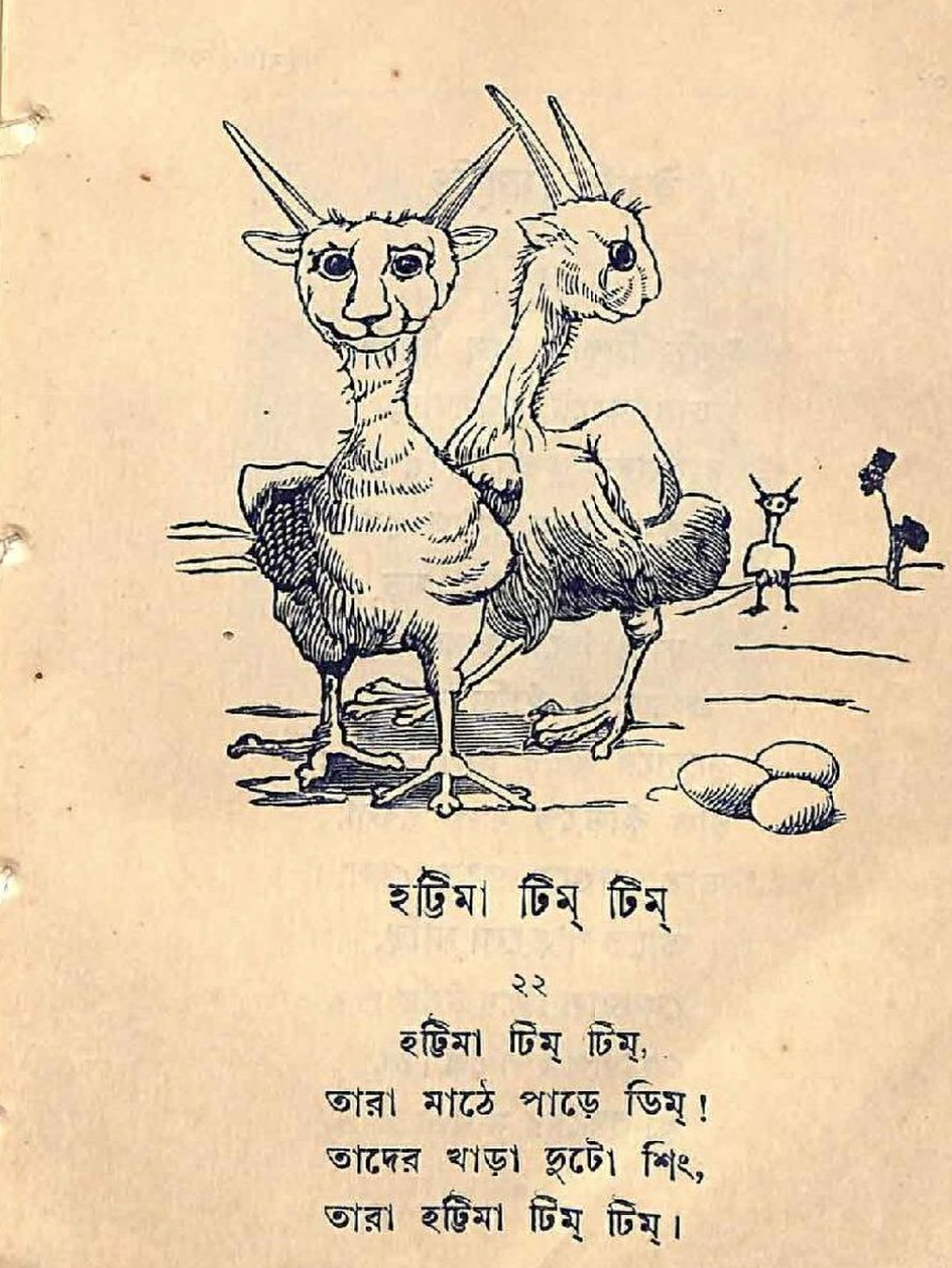
- Page number 37 of the 13th edition of the book “Khukumanir Chhara” published by the City Book Society in 1899.
- Language: Bengali
- Form: Nursery rhyme
- Publication date: 1899
- Lines: 4

Hattimatim tim (Bengali: হাট্টিমাটিম টিম) is a Bengali folk nursery rhyme. The poem describes the titular hattimatim tim, a peculiar group of animals that lay eggs in fields, and have two horns on their heads.

== Content ==
=== Bengali ===
হাট্টিমা টিম্ টিম্
তারা মাঠে পাড়ে ডিম্!
তাদের খাড়া দুটো শিং,
তারা হাট্টিমা টিম্ টিম্।

=== Transliteration ===
Hattimatim tim
Tara mathe pare dim
Tader khara duto shing
Tara Hattimatim tim

=== English ===
Hattimatim tim
They lay eggs on the field
They have two straight horns
They are Hattimatim tim

== History ==
Hattimatim Tim is a folk rhyme passed down from generation to generation. The writer is unknown.

"Hattimatim Tim" was first found In 1899 in Kolkata City Book Society’s "Khukumanir Chhara" book 13th edition, page 37. The book is a collection of folk poems and rhymes compiled by Jogindranath Sarkar.

In 1950, Shishu Shahito Shongshad, a publishing house in Kolkata, published a rhyming book containing colorful pictures for children called 'Chharar Chhobi'. This book contained four lined rhymes about the fictional animal called 'Hattima Tim Tim'.

It was again featured in 1952 in Narayan Gangopadhyay’s book “Chhotoder Shreshtho golpo” in a short story titled "Durshorsho motorcycle".

The rhymes of the book were compiled by Shri Mohendronath Dutto. After the publication of the book, the fictional animal Hattima Tim Tim became very popular among Bengali children. In 1974, The Gramophone Company of India (now Saregama) turned the six rhymes into a song. (Record number: 7LPE 110). It was sung by Shrimiti Alpona Bondopadhyay and directed by Nachikheta Ghosh, though Saregama's YouTube video mentions the name of Onnodashonkar Roy as the lyricist. In an interview, Roy said:

My favourite rhymes were 'Agdum Pagdum Ghoradum Shaje,' 'Khoka Ghumalo Para Juralo,' 'Hattimatim tim,' etc. Authentic folk culture, which spreads by word of mouth, and is passed down through generations. On the one hand this is humorous or non sense on the other. All these folk songs contain many years of experience, folk wisdom.

From this it becomes clear that Roy did not write the lyrics.

Again, Onnodashonkar used the two lines 'Hattimatim tim, ora mathe pare dim' in his rhyme titled 'Jolsha' (in this rhyme he also used the two lines 'Humpty, Dumpty sat on a wall' from an English rhyme).

== Attempt to investigate ==
Although the original poem consists of four lines, the poet of it is unknown.

From the 52-line poem written by expatriate Nadia Zaman, it can be seen that when a person named Tattu goes to the market, he receives an egg for free. He believed that perhaps a creature might emerge from the egg that could do all tasks. As a result, many people who believe in fantasy think that this creature might be some alien. Some even imagine it as a dinosaur. Additionally, there are many such stories in Chinese mythology that discuss eggs and giants. For example, from the story of the mythical Chinese giant Pangu, it is known that the universe was created from a giant that emerged from an egg. Some believe that perhaps this rhyme is related to a similar Chinese tale. It is also possible that this four-line poem reflects the traditional beliefs of rural Bengali people about ghosts or giants. All these ideas are purely imaginary and speculative. There is no certainty about how this four-line poem came into being or whether Nadia Zaman actually intended to convey all these ideas.

== Controversy ==
In late 2018, a post went viral on Facebook claiming Roknuzzaman Khan Dadabhai was the author of 'Hattima Tim Tim' and that the original rhyme was 52 lines. The main reason for this confusion was a book of rhymes written by Roknuzzaman Khan called 'Hattima Tim' that contained a rhyme called 'Hattima Tim' which has no similarity to the original 'Hattima Tim Tim'. This book was published in 1962 by Kakali Prakashani. The cover artist was Hashem Khan. A second edition was published by Muktdhara in 1975 and a third edition by BRAC in 1997 with multicolored covers and decorations; these two versions also had art by Hashem Khan.

The original author of the 52 lines was Nadia Zaman, a Bangladeshi expatriate living in the UK, who in 2012, published it on a blog. She wrote 48 lines herself and then added the last 4 lines from 'Hattima Tim Tim'.
