= Shibaji Chatterjee =

Indian singer and composer

- শিবাজি চ্যাটার্জী
- Born: Calcutta, West Bengal, India
- Occupations: Music director, composer, singer
- Spouse: Arundhati Holme Chowdhury (m. 1987)

Shibaji Chatterjee (Bengali: শিবাজি চ্যাটার্জী, Hindi: शिवाजी चटर्जी; sometimes also credited as Shivaji Chattopadhyaya) is an Indian singer and composer. He was born in Kolkata.

== Personal life ==
He is married to Arundhati Holme Chowdhury since 1987.

== Discography ==
=== Singer ===
- Chander Bari (2007)
- Alo (2003)
- Jiban Sandhan (1997)
- 1942: A Love Story (1994)
- Prithibir Shesh Station (1993)
- Pennam Calcutta (1992)
- Path-o-Prasad (1991)
- Sajani Go Sajani (1991)
- Neelimay Neel (1991)
- Mahapith Tarapith (1989)
- Agaman (1988)
- Anjali (1989)
- Abir (1987)
- Bhalobasa Bhalobasa (1985)
- Samapti (1983)

=== Composer ===
- Chander Bari (2007)
- Bhalobasar Onek Naam (2006)
- Alo (2003)

== Awards ==
| Year | Award | Film | Category |
|---|---|---|---|
| 1986 | BFJA Awards | Bhalobasa Bhalobasa | Best Playback Singer (male) |
| 1989 | BFJA Awards | Shudhu Tomari | Best Playback Singer (male) |
