= Ananda Ashram =

Anand Ashram
- Poster
- Directed by: Shakti Samanta
- Written by: Shakti Samanta; Kamleshwar (dialogue-Hindi); Prabhat Roy (dialogue-Bengali)
- Screenplay by: Shakti Samanta
- Story by: Sailajananda Mukhopadhyay
- Produced by: Shakti Samanta
- Starring: Ashok Kumar; Uttam Kumar; Sharmila Tagore
- Cinematography: Aloke Dasgupta
- Edited by: Bijoy Chowdhary
- Music by: Shyamal Mitra
- Production company: Shakti Films
- Distributed by: Shakti Films
- Release date: 14 October 1977
- Running time: 141 minutes
- Country: India
- Languages: Hindi; Bengali

Ananda Ashram (Hindi: Anand Ashram, English: The Ashram of joy) is a 1977 Indian bilingual romantic drama film made in Bengali and Hindi language simultaneously, co-written and directed by Shakti Samanta. Based on a story by film director and novelist, Sailajananda Mukhopadhyay, it stars Ashok Kumar, Uttam Kumar, Sharmila Tagore, Moushumi Chatterjee and Rakesh Roshan (making his debut in Bengali cinema) in lead roles. The same story was earlier filmed as 'Doctor' in 1940 starred by Pankaj Mullick, Ahindra Choudhury and Bharati Devi.

== Plot ==
Dr Amaresh lives with his wealthy father, a Thakur, in a small Indian town. Although the Thakur would prefer Amaresh to marry a woman from a similarly wealthy family, Amaresh has fallen in love with a poor woman named Asha and wishes to marry her. The Thakur is displeased and orders Amaresh to leave the house and never return. A few months later, the Thakur's employee Girdhari informs him that he has found an abandoned child by the riverbank and would like to adopt him. Initially, the Thakur does not want anything to do with the child, but when he sees him for the first time, he lets Girdhari have his way. Years later, the young Samaresh has grown up under the care of Girdhari and the Thakur, and travels abroad to study medicine. Upon his return, he decides to work for a chemical company. His travels take him to meet a beautiful woman named Sumita, her father and an elderly man named Doctor. Samaresh is perturbed by this doctor, who seems to know him very well and wants him to leave his job at the chemical company and start practising medicine in the small town where they live. What Samaresh does not know is that this doctor is his biological father, Amaresh. Neither of them knows what steps the Thakur will take when he finds out that Samaresh is his grandson.

== Cast ==
- Uttam Kumar as Dr. Amaresh Rai Chaudhary
- Sharmila Tagore as Asha Rai Chaudhary
- Rakesh Roshan as Dr. Samaresh Rai Chaudhary
- Moushumi Chatterjee as Sumita Dutta
- Ashok Kumar as Zamindaar/Pratap Narain Rai Chaudhary
- Asit Sen as Girdhari
- Utpal Dutt as Rasharaj Dutta, Sumita's dad(Cameo appearance)
- Anita Guha as Sumita's mom
- Chandrima Bhaduri
- Prema Narayan (Guest appearance)
- Alankar Joshi as Chandan Dutta, Sumit's younger brother (as Master Alankar)

== Production ==
After the success of Amanush in 1975, Shakti Samanta used almost the same cast for Ananda Ashram. Ashok Kumar was a notable addition to the cast, and this film marked the only collaboration between Uttam Kumar and Ashok Kumar.

This film also shot in Sandeshkhali Sundarban like Amanush and the Nataraj Studio Bombay. There was a scene in Anand Ashram where Uttam Kumar would come down from a high hill, speak a dialogue with the heroine. So then Uttam Kumar already had two heart attacks. Uttam Kumar rose to a high place at that age with great difficulty. Then the director Shakti Samant understood the mistake and apologized. He says to changing the set. But Uttam Kumar said nothing. The with that body, he ran down the two-storey hill again and did it ok in one shot. Director Prabhat Roy (also the assistant director in the film) remembered the dedication of Uttam Kumar which is bring him to the top and different to the other artists.

During the film production Mohunbagan Footballers in Mumbai at that time to play the Rovers Cup Final of 1977. On the evening, footballers turned upon the set to watching the shooting. Uttam Kumar always being a Mohunbagan fan. Uttam Kumar said to the footballers You should have to win the final and return to Kolkata with the trophy. Mohunbagan really become champions and kept good words of Uttam.

== Music ==
Ananda Ashram

Film score by Shyamal Mitra
- Released: 1977
- Recorded: 1977
- Studio: Shakti Films
- Genres: Feature Film Soundtrack, Bengali Ghazals
- Length: 23:01 (hindi)
- Label: Sa Re Ga Ma
- Producer: Shakti Samanta

Shyamal Mitra chronology
Jaal Sanyashi (1977)	Ananda Ashram (1977)	Bandi (1978)

The film had music by Shyamal Mitra, with lyrics by Indeevar

Song	Singer (s)	Duration
"Sara Pyar Tumhara"	Kishore Kumar, Asha Bhosle	3:58
"Tere Liye Maine Sabko Chhoda"	Kishore Kumar	4:01
"Raahi Naye Naye Rasta Naya Naya"	Kishore Kumar	3:40
"Tum Itni Sundar Ho"	Yesudas, Preeti Sagar	3:55
"Safal Wohi Jeevan Hai"	Shyamal Mitra	3:38
"Jab Chaho Chali Aaoongi"	Lata Mangeshkar	3:49

=== Bengali Songs ===
All music is composed by Shyamal Mitra and written by Gauriprasanna Mazumder.

- Prithibi Bodle Geche - Kishore Kumar
- Asha Chilo Valobasha Chilo - Kishore Kumar
- Tinti Montro Niye - Shyamal Mitra
- Valobeshe Dekei Dekhona - Asha Bhonsle
- Amar Shopno Tumi Ogo - Asha Bhonsle, Kishore Kumar
- Kotha Kichu Kichu Bujhe Nite Hoy - Aarti Mukherji, Shyamal Mitra

== Reception ==
In the article of 2015 The Hindu wrote It is Uttam Kumar’s commanding performance that leaves an impression on the viewer, especially the latter stage of his character when he carries himself with distinction. At no point does he indulge in histrionics. The director in fact does not allow anyone to drift from the balanced narration.

The songs of the film became major hits. After the significant success of Amanush, the collabarations of Uttam and Kishore Kumar became hugely popular in 1970s. The songs become evergreen and got the cult status.

The Bengali version was released on the occasions of Durga Puja in Bengal. Unfortunately the Hindi version faired averagely at the box office but Bengali version become a blockbuster as expected and Kumar puja track record. The film saw the run 26 weeks constantly in theatres and become highest grossing Bengali film in 1977. This film become one of Kumar's most successful films ever.
