= Purabi Dutta =

- Born: 17 March 1942; Calcutta, Bengal Presidency, British India
- Died: 1 December 2013 (aged 71) Sonarpur, Kolkata, West Bengal, India
- Genre: Playback singer
- Occupation: Singer

Purabi Dutta was an Indian Bengali language female singer from West Bengal. She is notable for her Nazrul Geeti (the songs created by Kazi Nazrul Islam).

== Early years ==
Purabi Dutta was daughter of Bibhuti Dutta, the famous classical vocal maestro. Her training was initiated at home. In 1946 she was a contestant in All India Music Competition organised by Chetla Murari Smriti Sangeet Sammilini where she won the silver trophy in vocal music.

== Career ==
Purabi Dutta was undoubtedly one of the noted exponents of Nazrulgeeti (the songs composed by Kazi Nazrul Islam). In her early days she was associated with various programs of All India Radio, Kolkata. She recorded many songs throughout her music career, mostly the songs composed by Kazi Nazrul Islam, known as NAZRUL SANGEET or NAZRUL GEETI. She selflessly dedicated herself in teaching Nazrul Sangeet for her entire life. For many years Purabi Dutta was attached to "Bani Chakra" of Gariahat. She was also attached to Bengal Music College, where she was a teacher along with Hemanta Mukherjee, Chinmoy Chattopadhyay, Akhilbandhu Ghosh and others. She was very close to Pandit Jnanprakas Ghosh, Biman Mukhopadhyay, Manabendra Mukhpadhyay, Adhir Bagchi and other eminent artists and singers of Bengal.

During 1950s and '60s Purabi Dutta was associated with All India Radio and performed in various programs.

Purabi Dutta's albums in Nazrulgeeti became very popular. Some of the album titles are noted below:

- 1974 Songs of Kazi Nazrul - SAREGAMA
- 1975 Songs of Kazi Nazrul - SAREGAMA
- 1980 Valentine Special - Bengali Romantic Nazrulgeeti
- 1982 Halud Gandar Phul
- 2014 Chharo Chharo Anchal
- 2014 Jhum Jhum Jhumra Nachte
- 2014 Shiuli Tolay Bhorbela - INRECO

Purabi Dutta appeared for a stage performance in the Bangla Sangeet Mela in April 2004, after keeping herself away for almost one and a half years from the spotlight. She sang two songs: মনে পরে আজ সে কোন জনমে (Mone pore aaj se kon janame), followed by নিরন্ধ্র মেঘে মেঘে অন্ধ গগন (Nirandhra meghe andha gagan). Angshuman Bhowmik observed:

"She has made the former her signature anyway, but the latter was a gem unearthed. Mythical allusions to Krishna’s departure from Vrindaban was there but it requires the regal command of an exponent to turn that tearful farewell into a catastrophic one.

== Death ==
Purabi Dutta died on Sunday, 1 December 2013, in her residence at Sonarpur (after she shifted from her Gariahat residence), far away from the music world she was acquainted with. In the obituary, Kolkata 24X7 news channel published the following:

"প্রয়াত হলেন প্রবাদ-প্রতীম শিল্পী পূরবী দত্ত৷ রবিবার সকালে মৃত্যু হয় তাঁর৷ গানের জগতে বিশেষত নজরুল গীতিতেই সুনাম অর্জন করেছিলেন এই শিল্পী৷ তবে শুধু নজরুল গীতি নয়, সময়ের সঙ্গে নিজেকে পরিবর্তন করে কিছু আধুনিক গানও গেয়েছিলেন এই শিল্পী৷ কিশোরী বয়স থেকেই নজরুল গীতিতে পারদর্শীতা লাভ করেছিলেন পূরবী দত্ত৷ বিশিষ্ট শিল্পীর মৃত্যুতে গভীর শোকপ্রকাশ করছেন মুখ্যমন্ত্রী মমতা বন্দ্যোপাধ্যায়৷"

A translation

(The legendary artist Purabi Dutta died on Sunday morning. Though she became a doyen in Nazrulgeeti, she was also proficient in modern Bengali songs adapting with the changing time. Since her very young age she accrued immense fame as an artist of Nazrul Geeti. Mamata Banerjee, Hon'ble Chief Minister of West Bengal, expressed her deep sorrow at the passing of the legendary singer.)

== Memoirs of the Life, Writings, & Correspondence ==
- Pandit Jnanprakash Ghosh was involved in All India Radio for a long time, and during his tenure as producer in light music unit he produced very popular programs such as "Sangeetanjali", "Desh Bandana", "Ramya Geeti" and "E Maser Gaan" (Song of the month). He himself composed music in the lyrics by many poets, such as Bani Kumar, Nalinikanta Sarkar, Murari Mohan Sen, Dhirendra Narayan Roy, Shyamal Gupta, Gouriprasanna Majumdar, Prasun Mitra etc. In 1965 he composed tune for a song written by Bani Kumar: "ভারত নভের শুভ্র বীণায় কোন অমৃত ডাক দিলো রে". The song was sung by Gouri Mitra, Purabi Dutta, Subash Mitra, Diptiprakas Majumdar and Dhiren Basu. It was aired in the program "Desh Bandana".
- While releasing her newest album on Nazrulgeeti on 19 September 2013 at Bengal Club, Kolkata, eminent singer Indrani Sen expressed her gratitude towards her gurus Shrimati Purabi Dutta and Shri Biman Mukhopadhay. This was the last known public appearance of Srimati Purabi Dutta.

== Selected list of songs ==
List of Songs

Songs of Purabi Dutta
Song	Year	Album/Type	Tune/Music composer	Lyrics	Label
Adho Rate Jadi Ghum	1974	Songs of Kazi Nazrul	Kazi Nazrul Islam	Kazi Nazrul Islam	Saregama
Antare Tumi Achho Chirodin			Kazi Nazrul Islam	Kazi Nazrul Islam	
Brajo Gopi Khele Hori	1974	Songs of Kazi Nazrul	Kazi Nazrul Islam	Kazi Nazrul Islam	Saregama
Chaitali Chandini Rate	1966	Gems from Kazi Nazrul Islam	Kazi Nazrul Islam	Kazi Nazrul Islam	
Chander Mato Nirobe	1980	Love	Kazi Nazrul Islam	Kazi Nazrul Islam	
Chharo Chharo Aanchal	1980	Bengali Romantic Nazrulgeeti	Kazi Nazrul Islam	Kazi Nazrul Islam	
Chhonder Bonya Horini Aronya	1974	Songs of Kazi Nazrul	Kazi Nazrul Islam	Kazi Nazrul Islam	Saregama
Elo E Banante Paagal Basanta			Kazi Nazrul Islam	Kazi Nazrul Islam	
Eso He Sajal Shyam Ghano Deya			Dhirendra Nath Das	Kazi Nazrul Islam	
Kemone Kohi Priyo	1990		Kazi Nazrul Islam	Kazi Nazrul Islam	Inreco
Juin Kunje Mon Bhramara			Kazi Nazrul Islam	Kazi Nazrul Islam	
Ogo Sundar	1980	Bengali Romantic Nazrulgeeti	Kazi Nazrul Islam	Kazi Nazrul Islam	
Oi Godhuli Bodhur Sithite Sindur Anka	1957	Adhunik	Shyamal Ghosh	Prabir Majumdar	
Palash Manjari Paraye De			Kazi Nazrul Islam	Kazi Nazrul Islam	Inreco
Paradeshi Bondhu Ghum Bhangayiyo	1974	Songs of Kazi Nazrul	Kazi Nazrul Islam	Kazi Nazrul Islam	Saregama
Paro Janame Dekha Hobe Priyo	1975	Songs of Kazi Nazrul		Kazi Nazrul Islam	Saregama
Piu Piu Bole Papiya	1990		Kazi Nazrul Islam	Kazi Nazrul Islam	Inreco
Sedin Chhoilo Ki Godhuli Lagan		Love	Kazi Nazrul Islam	Kazi Nazrul Islam	
Shyam Tumi Jodi Radha	1980	Bengali Romantic Nazrulgeeti	Kazi Nazrul Islam	Kazi Nazrul Islam	
Soi Bhalo Kore Binod Beni	1968	Sanjher Pakhira Phirilo Kulaya	Kazi Nazrul Islam	Kazi Nazrul Islam	Saregama
