= Nayika Sangbad =

1967 film by Agradoot

- Directed by: Agradoot
- Written by: Prasanta Deb
- Starring: Uttam Kumar; Anjana Bhowmick
- Cinematography: Bibhuti Laha
- Edited by: Baidyanath Chattopadhyay
- Music by: Hemant Kumar
- Production company: B. K. Productions
- Release date: 1967
- Country: India
- Language: Bengali

Nayika Sangbad (transl. News About the Heroine) is a 1967 Indian Bengali-language romantic comedy film directed by Agradoot and written by Prasanta Deb. The film stars Uttam Kumar and Anjana Bhowmick. It was remade in Tamil as Sumathi En Sundari (1971).

== Plot ==
Urmila, a popular film actress, accidentally misses a train midway through her journey to a new shooting location. She takes shelter in the quarter of the station master Alok for the next few days and falls in love with the new place as well as its people.

== Cast ==
- Uttam Kumar as Alok
- Anjana Bhowmick as Urmita
- Pahari Sanyal as Lahiri
- Anubha Gupta as Rama
- Mrinal Mukherjee

== Production ==
Nayika Sangbad was produced under B. K. Productions, directed by Agradoot and written by Prasanta Deb. Cinematography was handled by Bibhuti Laha, and editing by Baidyanath Chattopadhyay. The film was shot in black and white, and contained on 14 reels.

== Soundtrack ==
The music was composed by Hemant Kumar.

Track listing
| No. | Title | Lyrics | Singer(s) | Length |
|---|---|---|---|---|
| 1. | "Ei Purnima Raat" | Gauriprasanna Majumder | Hemant Kumar | 3:03 |
| 2. | "Aaj Chanchal Mon Jodi" | Gauri Prasanna Majumder | Sandhya Mukherjee | 2:41 |
| 3. | "Keno E Hriday Chanchal Holo" | Mohini Chowdhury | Sandhya Mukherjee | 3:27 |
| 4. | "Ki Mishti Dekho Mishti" | Mohini Chowdhury | Sandhya Mukherjee | 3:02 |
| Total length: | | | | 12:13 |

== Other versions ==
Nayika Sangbad was remade in Tamil as Sumathi En Sundari (1971). The 2013 film Nayika Sangbad has no relation to its 1967 namesake apart from involving the same premise of a film actress disappearing.
