= Thana Theke Aschi (1965 film) =

Thana Theke Aschhi
- Theatrical release poster
- Directed by: Hiren Nag
- Written by: Ajit Ganguly
- Screenplay by: Ajit Ganguly (Dialogues)
- Based on: An Inspector Calls by J B Priestley
- Starring: Uttam Kumar; Madhabi Mukherjee; Kamal Mitra; Chaya Debi
- Cinematography: Kanai Dey
- Edited by: Baidyanath Chatterjee
- Music by: Timir Baran Bhattacharya
- Production company: United Cine Productions
- Release date: 29 January 1965 (Kolkata)
- Running time: 113 minutes
- Country: India
- Language: Bengali

Thana Theke Aschhi (English: Coming From Police Station) is a 1965 Indian Bengali-language psychological thriller film co-written and directed by Hiren Nag. Produced by Hemen Mitra, Tapas Saha and Ratan Chakraborty under the banner of United Cine Producers, it was based on a play of the same name by Ajit Gangopadhyay, which itself was an adaptation of the English play An Inspector Calls (1945) by J. B. Priestley. The film stars Uttam Kumar, Madhabi Mukherjee and Anjana Bhowmick in the lead, while Kamal Mitra, Chhaya Debi, Dilip Mukherjee, Prashanta Kumar and Jahor Roy play another pivotal roles. It revolves around a suicide mystery of a stranger woman, to look into which Tinkari Halder, an inspector from Padmapukur police station, makes his arrival at the house of Chandra Madhab Sen, an eminent industrialist and later it gets revealed that every members of Sen's family is however connected to the victim's commitment of the suicide, including Sen himself.

Thana Theke Aschhi was remade with the same name by Saran Dutta in 2010, where Sabyasachi Chakraborty portrayed Tinkari Halder.

== Plot ==
Chandra Madhab Sen, an industrialist, finds his life changed with the arrival of Tinkari Haldar, a sub-inspector, at his doorstep inquiring about a suicide mystery.

== Cast ==
- Uttam Kumar as Tinkari Halder
- Madhabi Mukherjee
- Kamal Mitra as Chandra Madhab Sen
- Chaya Debi
- Anjana Bhowmick
- Jahor Roy
- Bireswar Sen
- Dilip Mukherjee
- Ardhendu Mukherjee
- Pranab Roy
- Khagen Pathak

== Soundtrack ==
Thana Theke Aschi

Soundtrack album by Timir Baran Bhattacharya
- Released: 1965
- Recorded: 1964
- Studio: United Cine Productions
- Genre: Feature Film Soundtrack
- Label: Angel Digital Pvt Ltd

Timir Baran Bhattacharya chronology
Bicharak (1959)	Thana Theke Aschi (1965)

== Reception ==
The film has been regarded as one of the finest thriller films ever made. Uttam Kumar as Inspector Tinkari Haldar gave one of his finest performances ever and his performance gained overwhelming appreciation all over India. The film became a hit at the box office.

== Remake ==
The film was remade in Bengali in 2010 with the same name, Thana Theke Aschi, starring Pramabrata Chatteejee, Sabyasachi Chakraborty, Paoli Daam, Rudranil Ghosh and Dulal Lahiri.
