= Rajkanya (1965 film) =

- DVD cover of the film
- Directed by: Sunil Bandyopadhyay
- Story by: Ritwik Ghatak (screenplay), Ritwik Ghatak
- Produced by: Roopchaya Chitra
- Starring: Uttam Kumar; Rina Ghosh; Bhanu Bandopadhyay; Tarun Kumar
- Cinematography: Bijoy Ghosh
- Edited by: Ardhendu Chattopadhyay
- Music by: Shyamal Mitra
- Release date: 2 April 1965
- Country: India
- Language: Bengali

Rajkanya (Bengali: রাজকন্যা, English: Princess) is a 1965 Bengali film directed by Sunil Bandyopadhyay. The movie was based on a story and screenplay by legendary film director Ritwik Ghatak. Uttam Kumar, Rina Ghosh, Bhanu Bandopadhyay, and Tarun Kumar portray the main characters.

== Technical team ==
- Story, Dialogues & Screenplay: Ritwik Ghatak
- Cinematography: Bijoy Ghosh
- Editor: Ardhendu Chattopadhyay
- Music: Shyamal Mitra
- Lyrics: Gouri Prasanna Majumdar
- Playback Singers: Shyamal Mitra and Asha Bhosle
- Art Director: Kartik Bose
- Dance Director: Shakti Nag

== Cast ==
- Uttam Kumar
- Rina Ghosh
- Chandrabati Devi
- Gitali Ray
- Shekhar Chattopadhyay
- Ajit Chattopadhyay
- Bhanu Bandyopadhyay
- Satya Banerjee
- Shyam Laha
- Prasanto Kumar
- Gour Shree
- Pramatha Gangopadhyay

== Songs ==
- E Jeno Ojana Ek Poth - Sung by Shyamal Mitra and picturized on Uttam Kumar
- Ei Sei Purnima Raat - Sung by Shyamal Mitra & Asha Bhonsle and picturized on Uttam Kumar & Rina Ghosh
