= Bani Kumar =

Radio broadcaster and composer

Kābya Sarasbatī Bani Kumar
- Baidyonath Bhattacharya
- Born: 23 November 1907; Kanpur Village, Howrah
- Died: 15 August 1978 (aged 70); Kolkata
- Other names: Bani Kumar (in radio station) ‘Ānandabardhana’, ‘Biṣṇu-gupta’ (in literature)
- Occupations: radio broadcaster, Lyricist, Producers, composer
- Known for: Mahisasuramardini (1931–present)
- Parents: Bidhu Bhushan Bhattacharya (father); Aparna Bhattacharya (mother)

Baidyonath Bhattacharya (23 November 1907 – 15 August 1978) popularly known as Bani Kumar was a radio broadcaster, playwright, composer, radio script writer from Kolkata, India and a contemporary of Pankaj Mallick and Birendra Krishna Bhadra. He worked for the All India Radio, India's National Radio broadcaster for several years during its early, starting 1930s, and during this period he produced and adapted several plays songs etc.

He is most known for his script writing and composition of India's oldest radio programme, Mahishashura Mardini (1931), a collection of shlokas and songs broadcast by All India Radio Calcutta (now Kolkata) at 4:00 am, in the dawn of Mahalaya.

== Early life ==
Bani Kumar's original name is Baidyanath Bhattacharya. He was born on 26 November 1907 in Kanpur village of Howrah. His father, Bidhu Bhushan Bhattacharya was a sanskrit scholar and historian and mother Aparna Bhattacharya. Bani Kumar was the eldest son of their two sons and two daughters. Their ancestral house was at Antpur in Hooghly district.

== Academic life ==
Bani Kumar received his primary education at Howrah Zilla School. There he concentrated on poetry with the influence of a teacher and poet Karunanidhan Bandyopadhyay. He then graduated in English from Presidency College. His father and grandfather had a knowledge of Sanskrit, so he studied Sanskrit and got the title Kābya Sarasbatī.

== Career ==
He could not afford to study under the stress of the domestic life, he started working in the mint. He left the job and joined the radio station when the Calcutta Radio Station was established at 1 No. Garstin Place in the year 1927. At that time Raichand Boral, Pankaj Mallick, Birendra Krishna Bhadra and other artists joined there in the interest of Nripendranath Majumdar, the officer in charge of the Indian ceremonial division of the radio station. Baidyanath joined as a writer staff artist and began his radio career under the name of Bani Kumar. He is best known as the creator and compositor of the Mahisasuramardini radio program.
