= Biman Mukhopadhyay =

Bengali musician

Biman Mukhopadhyay (September 1930 – 16 March 2011) was a Bengali singer and trainer.

== Early life and education ==
After his graduation from the Scottish Church College, at the University of Calcutta, he started on a career of music.

== Career ==
He was described by Padmabhusan Pt. Jnan Prakash Ghosh as a "living Encyclopedia of Music" in 1970 in a program organized by Rajya Sangeet Academy. Many famous Bengali singers like Angur Bala, Sandhya Mukhopadhyay, Hemanta Kumar Mukhopadhyay, Manabendra Mukhopadhyay, Purabi Dutta, Indrani Sen, Haimanti Sukla, Sipra Bose have recorded their songs under his training.

== Awards ==
- Harmonica Sangeet Samman given by Innovative Systems Ltd.(2007).
- Uttam Kumar Award given by Shilpi Sansad (2008).
