= Srabani Sen =

Srabani Sen শ্রাবণী সেন
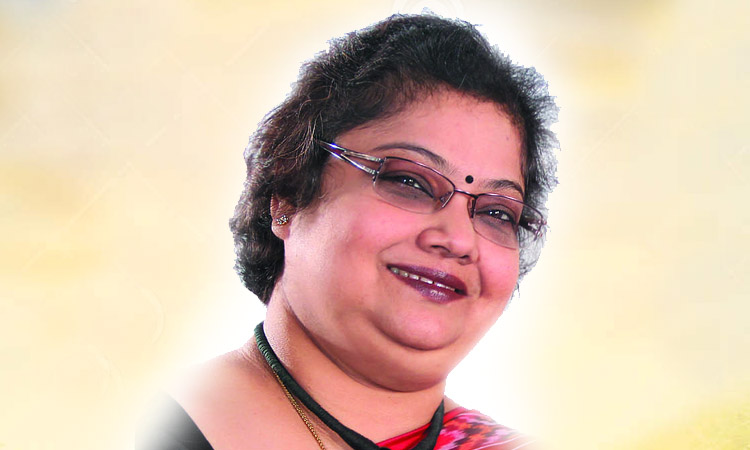

Background information
- Born: 13 August 1966 (age 60)
- Origin: Kolkata, West Bengal, India
- Genre: Rabindra Sangeet
- Occupations: Singer; music teacher
- Instrument: Vocal
- Years active: 1996–present
- Website: srabanisen.com

Srabani Sen (also spelt as Sraboni Sen; Bengali: শ্রাবণী সেন) is an Indian exponent of Rabindra Sangeet and Bengali songs. She is a daughter of Sumitra Sen and sister to Indrani Sen. She is a successor to the gharana, which has contributed to the spread of Tagore's music across the world.

== Career ==
She was schooled at Patha Bhavan school in Kolkata. Later she studied geography at the Gokhale Memorial Girls' College, a women's college affiliated with the University of Calcutta and earned a postgraduate degree from the same university. She started as a journalist for the Bengali magazine Manorama, before opting for a full-time career in music. Sen's tutelage commenced under her mother's guidance was followed by training at Geetabitan Music Institute.

She has sung on the soundtracks of many films, including Dekha, Baariwali, Swapner Feriwalla, Sanjhbaatir Rupkothara, Ballygunge Court, and Hemanter Pakhi.

In 2014 she started her own music academy, teaching Rabindrasangeet.

She is the daughter of singer Sumitra Sen, and the younger sister of another Rabindra Sangeet exponent Indrani Sen.

Her mother, Sumitra Sen died on 3 January 2023 at the age of 89.

== Awards ==
- In 2000, she was awarded the B.F.J.A award for the best female playback singer for her soulful rendition of Rabindra Sangeet Amala Dhabala Paaley in director Rituparno Ghosh’s film, Utsab.
