= Shyamal Mitra =

Indian singer and music director (1929–1987)

Shyamal Mitra শ্যামল মিত্র
- Born: 14 January 1929; Naihati, Bengal Presidency, British India
- Died: 15 November 1987 (aged 58) Calcutta, West Bengal, India
- Genres: Bengali music; Indian semi-classical; Bengali Ghazal
- Occupations: Playback singer; music director; producer

Shyamal Mitra (Note: Bengali pronunciation: [ʃæmɔl mit̪ɾo].) (Bengali pronunciation: [ʃæmɔl mit̪ɾo]; 14 January 1929 – 15 November 1987) was an Indian playback singer, music director, and film producer. He worked extensively in both Hindi and Bengali cinema and was regarded as one of the notable figures of the golden era of the Bengali music industry, alongside Hemanta Mukherjee, Kishore Kumar, Manabendra Mukhopadhyay, Manna Dey and other bengali singers.

Mitra's baritone voice was known for its expressive quality and wide emotional range. In addition to recording a large number of Bengali modern songs, he contributed as a playback singer in more than one hundred Bengali films and composed music for over fifty films. He also lent his voice to songs in other Indian languages, including Hindi, Assamese, and Oriya.

== Early life ==
Shyamal Mitra was born into a Bengali Kayastha family in Naihati, a city near Kolkata, India. His ancestral village was Patul, near Seakhala. His father, Sadhan Kumar Mitra, was a well-known doctor in Naihati who wished his son to follow in his footsteps and become a doctor. However, Shyamal Mitra was deeply inclined towards music, drawing inspiration from his mother and from local singer Mrinal Kanti Ghosh. The family home was a meeting place for individuals associated with the Indian People's Theatre Association (IPTA), which enabled young Mitra to come in contact with Salil Chowdhury. Shyamal Mitra and his youngest sister Reba often performed the song "O Aalor Pathajatree" on the streets in support of IPTA activities.

Mitra pursued his graduate studies at Hooghly Mohsin College, then affiliated with the University of Calcutta. There, he came under the influence of Satinath Mukhopadhyay, a noted exponent of modern Bengali music, who encouraged him to pursue his musical interests. Later, after moving to Kolkata, he met Sudhirlal Chakraborty, which became a turning point in his career.

Mitra initially faced struggles but received his first opportunity as a playback singer in Sunandar Biye (1949), alongside Supriti Ghosh and Pratima Bandyopadhyay. Around the same time, he recorded his first modern songs under the His Master's Voice label, under the guidance of Sudhirlal Chakraborty. Following the death of Chakraborty in 1952, Mitra recorded "Smriti Tumi Bedonar", which marked a significant breakthrough in his career. Thereafter, he emerged as one of the leading singers and composers of Bengal.

== Career ==
Shyamal Mitra began his career as a singer and music composer in the Bengali music industry. During the 1950s and early 1960s, he composed music for successful films such as Joy Maa Kali Boarding, Jamalaye Jibanta Manush, and Bhranti Bilas. During this period, he also contributed as a playback singer in numerous Bengali films.

In 1963, Mitra produced the film Deya Neya, which marked another milestone in his career. He later produced films such as Rajkanya, Kheya, and Ami Se O Sakha. He was also the producer and distributor of Garh Nasimpur.

In the early 1950s, Mitra travelled to Mumbai with Salil Chowdhury, where he worked in the films Musafer, Biraj Bou, and Naukri. He returned to Mumbai in 1973 and collaborated with director Shakti Samanta in films such as Amanush and Anand Ashram. He also worked in F. C. Mehra's Bandi and Basu Chatterjee's Safed Jhoot and Mamta. Subsequently, he returned to Kolkata and continued to compose and sing many popular Bengali modern and film songs.

Mitra maintained a long association with All India Radio, where he performed in various programmes, including the annual Mahisasuramardini. In that broadcast, he sang "Subhra Sankha Robe" along with Arati Mukhopadhyay and Ashima Mukherjee.

Apart from modern Bengali songs and film music, Mitra also contributed to other forms of Bengali music, including Rabindrasangeet, Nazrul Geeti, Chotoder Gaan, and Atul Prasadi. As a composer, he also worked in the "Jatra Pala Bibi Anandomoyee".

Mitra collaborated with many prominent singers, including Hemanta Kumar Mukhopadhyay, Tarun Bandyopadhyay, Dhananjay Bhattacharya, Pratima Bandyopadhyay, Sandhya Mukhopadhyay, Satinath Mukhopadhyay, Ila Basu, Supriti Ghosh, Gayatri Basu, Utpala Sen, Alpana Banerjee, Manabendra Mukhopadhyay, Talat Mahmood, and Kishore Kumar.

As an actor, he appeared in Bengali films such as Sharey Chuattor and Shap Mochan.

== Death and legacy ==
Shyamal Mitra died on 15 November 1987. He was survived by his wife, Protima Mitra, two sons, Saibal Mitra and Saikat Mitra, and a daughter, Monobina. His son Saikat later followed in his footsteps and became a noted Bengali singer, performing many of his father's songs.

== As music composer ==
The following is a list of films for which Shyamal Mitra composed music:

Films for which Shyamal Mitra composed music
Year	Film
1953	Lakh Taka
1955	Joy Maa Kali Boarding
1958	Jamalaye Jibanta Manush
1958	Deli Passenger
1959	Bhranti
1960	Sokher Chor
1963	Hashi Sudhu Hashi Noi
1963	Bhranti Bilas
1963	Deya Neya
1964	Saptarshi
1965	Trishna
1965	Rajkanya
1967	Kheya
1967	Hotath Dekha
1968	Garh Nasimpur
1969	Bibaha Bibhrat
1969	Duranta Charai
1970	Samantaral
1970	Padmagolap
1971	Pratibad
1971	Janani
1971	Jiban Jiggasha
1971	Bhanu Goenda Jahar Assistant
1972	Andha Atit
1973	Bon Palashir Padabali
1973	Chithi
1974	Amanush
1975	Phulu Thakurma
1975	Ami Se O Sokha
1977	Rajbangsha
1977	Ajashra Dhonnyobad
1977	Jaal Sanyashi
1977	Anand Ashram
1978	Bandi
1978	Nishan
1978	Dhanraj Tamang
1980	Priyatama
1981	Khana Baraha
1981	Bandi Balaka
1981	Kalankini Kankabati
1982	Maayer Ashirbaad
1982	Maatir Sorgo
1983	Songsarer Itikotha
1986	Kenaram Becharam
1987	Mohamilan
1990	Ekaki

== As playback singer ==
Shyamal Mitra as playback singer
Year	Film
1951	Sunandaar Biye
1953	Sare Chuattor
1955	Bhagabaan Shri Shri Ramakrishna
1955	Dashhu Mohan
1955	Raat Bhore
1955	Saapmochon
1955	Sri Krishna Sudama
1955	Upohaar
1956	Sagarika
1956	Asamaptaa
1956	Maamlar Phol
1957	Sindur
1957	Eaktaara
1957	Ogo Suncho
1957	Prithibi Amare Chai
1957	Surer Poroshe
1957	Punormilan
1958	Bhanu Pelo Lottery
1959	Aabak Prithivi
1959	Dersho Khokaar Kando
1959	E Johor Se Johor Noy
1959	Kichukhhon
1959	Maahut Bondhure
1959	Nirdharito Silpir Onuposthitite
1959	Baari Theke Paliye
1959	Mriter Morte Agomon
1960	Kono Eakdin
1960	Sunobaranari
1960	Sohorer Itikotha
1960	Chupi Chupi Aashey
1961	Kothin Maaya
1961	Keri Saheber Munshi
1962	Maayar Songsaar
1962	Kaajal
1962	Agnisikha
1963	Dwiper Naam Tiarang
1963	Aakashpradeep
1964	Deep Nebhe Nai
1964	Cheenamukh / Kaantataar
1964	Kostipathar
1964	Laalpathor
1964	Taa Hole
1965	Abhaya O Shrikanto
1965	Antaraal
1965	Mohalogno
1966	Oshru Diye Lekha
1966	Angikaar
1966	Pandober Bonobaas
1966	Rajodrohi
1967	Bodhubaran
1967	Prostor Sakhhor
1968	Aapanjan
1968	Baaluchori
1968	Hangshamithun
1969	Kamallata
1969	Panna Hire Chuni
1969	Andhar Surya
1969	Bonjotsna
1969	Maa O Meye
1970	Muktisnaan
1970	Nishipadma
1970	Ruposhi
1970	Sona Boudi
1971	Onno Maati Onno Rong
1971	Bhagya
1971	Sachimaar Songsaar
1971	Shakuntala
1972	Noya Michil
1972	Bonpalashir Podaboli
1972	Archana
1972	Biraaj Bou
1973	Nokol Sona
1974	Alo Andhare
1974	Daabi
1976	Chutir Ghonta
1976	Sei Chookh
1977	Tir Bhanga Dheu
1977	Behula Lokhindor
1978	Nishitrishna
1979	G T Road
1979	Bhagyalipi
1979	Dub De Mon Kali Bole
1979	Aami Ratan
1981	Mondomodhur
1983	Utsorgo
1983	Jibon Moron
1984	Silalipi
1985	Roktojoba
1987	Raajpurush
1988	Aparadhi
—	Omor Prem
—	Aamader Desh
—	Saraswatir Protigga
—	Ekadoshi
—	Haashitukui Thaak
—	Sondhay Surya
—	Bhorer Kuasha
—	Maatir Putul
—	Dui Bondhu

== See also ==
- List of Indian film music directors
