= Garh Nasimpur =

- Directed by: Ajit Lahiri
- Screenplay by: Barindranath Das
- Story by: Barindranath Das
- Starring: Uttam Kumar; Biswajit Chatterjee; Madhabi Mukherjee; Ruma Guhathakurta
- Music by: Shyamal Mitra
- Production company: Shadow Production
- Release date: 1 November 1968
- Running time: 135 minutes
- Country: India
- Language: Bangla

Garh Nasimpur is a 1968 Indian Bengali language historical action film directed by Ajit Lahiri. The film was released under the banner of Shadow Productions in 1968 and its music was directed by Shyamal Mitra. The film stars Uttam Kumar, Biswajit Chatterjee, Madhavi Mukherjee, and Ruma Guhathakurta.

== Synopsis ==
The story is set in 1751 when Shahjahan was the emperor and Prince Shuja was the subedar of Bengal. But many conspired to become kings. Meanwhile, Prince Aurangzeb has met the King of Golconda. Shuja especially liked Raja Indranarayana of Nasimpur but as a conspirator he occupied the territory of his very close friend Umakanta Roy. Devkant Roy's son Umakanta is still with Indranarayana. One day he met Bhujang Haldar, the leader of a band of robbers. His dewan forbade Basudev to meet Uttara, the princess of Nasimpur. But Uttara loves Basudev, she tells him that his activities are not acceptable to her. Eventually Mir Jumla helped Prince Aurangzeb and Basudev conspired with Mir Jumla. But Umakanta exposes all the conspiracies and then reunites with Uttara.

== Cast ==
- Uttam Kumar
- Biswajit Chatterjee
- Madhabi Mukherjee as Uttara
- Dev Mukherjee as Basudeb
- Asit Baran
- Bhanu Bandopadhyay
- Bikash Roy
- Ruma Guha Thakurta
- Anup Kumar
- Tarun Kumar
- Kamal Mitra
- Shambhu Bhattacharya
- Shekhar Chatterjee
- Subrata Chatterjee
- Padma Devi
- Master Prasoon
- Dilip Roy

== Soundtrack ==
All music is composed by Shyamal Mitra.

song title
No.	Title	singer (s)	Length
1.	"Ogo Sundor"	Aarti Mukherjee	2:33
2.	"Je Golap Kaantar Ghaye"	Sandhya Mukherjee	3:32
3.	"Tuhun Chandra Mor"	Aarti Mukherjee, Shyamal Mitra	3:31
4.	"Duti Aakhi Taara"	Shyamal Mitra	3:36
5.	"Borosha Je Elo"	Aarti Mukherjee	3:35
