= Sumathi En Sundari =

1971 film by C. V. Rajendran

- Theatrical release poster
- Directed by: C. V. Rajendran
- Screenplay by: Chithralaya Gopu
- Story by: Prasantha Deb
- Starring: Sivaji Ganesan; Jayalalithaa
- Cinematography: Thambu
- Edited by: N. M. Shankar
- Music by: M. S. Viswanathan
- Production company: Ram Kumar Films
- Release date: 14 April 1971
- Running time: 138 minutes
- Country: India
- Language: Tamil

Sumathi En Sundari (transl. My beautiful Sumathi) is a 1971 Indian Tamil-language romantic comedy film, directed by C. V. Rajendran. The film stars Sivaji Ganesan and Jayalalithaa. It is a remake of the 1967 Bengali film Nayika Sangbad. The film was released on 14 April 1971.

== Plot ==
An actress named Sumathi misses her train and takes shelter at an estate manager's house and is mistaken for his wife. She pretends to be a runaway wife named Sundari, and he pretends to be her husband to maintain the pretense for his colleagues. The two eventually fall in love, but the film crew tracks her down to the estate, creating a conflict between her career and her newfound love.

== Cast ==
- Sivaji Ganesan as Madhu
- Jayalalithaa as Sumathi / Sundari
- V. Gopalakrishnan as Director Chinnasamy
- K. A. Thangavelu as Rathnasamy
- Nagesh as Mannangatti Sundaram
- Sachu as Sachu / Saraswathi
- Thengai Srinivasan as Paramanandam
- Senthamarai as Railway Station Master
- Vennira Aadai Moorthy as Moorthy
- Jayakumari as Dancer
- Gundu Karuppaiah as Iyer
- S. N. Parvathy as Parvathi
- Gemini Maali as the film producer

== Production ==
The filming was completely held at Kodaikanal and was also held at Thekkady, Kerala for 20 days. Rajendran wanted two horses for an important scene however after he found one of the two horses to be skinny and rides only in reverse he decided not to change the horse as it would become difficult to obtain the call sheets of Ganesan so he shot the scene with Nagesh riding in skinny horse and Ganesan riding a much healthier horse converting into a humorous scene.

== Soundtrack ==
The music was composed by M. S. Viswanathan. "Pottu Vaitha Mugamo" is the first song that S. P. Balasubrahmanyam sang for a Ganesan film; another man was originally to sing the song, but Viswanathan chose Balasubrahmanyam. That song is based on Valaji raga.

Song	Singers	Lyrics	Length
"Oru Alayamagum Mangai Manadhu"	P. Susheela	Kannadasan	05:24
"Ellorukkum Kaalam Varum"	A. L. Raghavan, L. R. Eswari	Kannadasan	02:58
"Oh Orayiram"	P. Susheela	Kannadasan	04:00
"Pottu Vaitha Mugamo"	S. P. Balasubrahmanyam, B. Vasantha	Kannadasan	05:10
"Ye Pille Sachayi"	T. M. Soundararajan, A. L. Raghavan, L. R. Eswari	Kannadasan	04:32
"Oru Tharam Ore Tharam"	T. M. Soundararajan, P. Susheela	Vaali	03:30
"Kalyana Santhaiyile"	P. Susheela	Kannadasan	02:25

== Release and reception ==
Sumathi En Sundari was released on 14 April 1971. T. G. Vaidyanathan of Film World appreciated the film.
