= Krishna Dasgupta =

Bengali classical singer and music teacher

Srimati Krishna Dasgupta
- শ্রীমতী কৃষ্ণা দাশগুপ্ত

Background information
- Born: Krishna Ganguly; 29 December 1937; Janai, Hooghly, West Bengal, India
- Died: 2013 (aged 75–76) Kolkata, West Bengal, India
- Genres: Playback singer
- Occupation: Singer

Krishna Dasgupta (Bengali: কৃষ্ণা দাশগুপ্ত) (born as Krishna Ganguly, 29 December 1937 – 2013), one of the foremost disciples of Sangeetacharya Tarapada Chakraborty of Kotali Gharana was a renowned Bengali classical singer and music teacher from West Bengal, India, who sang numerous songs in Bengali language movies and non-film as well, particularly during the 1950s, 60s and 70s. She is widely known for lending voice in Mahisasuramardini, the popular early Bengali special dawn radio programme that has been broadcast since 1931 on All India Radio (AIR) in West Bengal. A documentary made on Smt. Krishna Das Gupta, her life & musical journey. The name of the documentary is "Harano Sur" "The forgotten Melody" made by Smt. Nandini Sengupta Chakraborti. She is one of a disciples of Smt. Krishna Das Gupta.

== Early life ==
Krishna Dasgupta was born in Janai, Hooghly in West Bengal on 29 December 1937. She was a noted disciple of renowned Indian classical vocalists Acharya Tarapada Chakraborty and Ustad Amir Khan.

== Career ==
Krishna Dasgupta was an accomplished versatile singer, particularly known for her khyal, thumri, bhajan, as well as Bengali modern songs. She had a special style of performance that made her recitals unique. She had done playback for songs composed by Pandit Jnan Prakash Ghosh, as well for Bengali films like Asamapta (1956), Ektara (1957), Rajlakshmi O Srikanta (1958), Bhranti, Nader Nimai (1960) and Bipasha (1962), among others. She had performed at various music conferences too.

She is widely known today for lending voice in Mahisasuramardini, the popular early Bengali special dawn radio programme that has been broadcast since 1931 on All India Radio (AIR) in West Bengal. In the program, she sang the song Akhilo Bimane Tabo Jayagaane.

== Death and legacy ==
Krishna Dasgupta died in 2013 in Kolkata.

One of her students, Nandini Chakraborty, the daughter of renowned cinematographer Ramananda Sengupta, has created a documentary on her life, Harano Sur.
