= Dibratrir Kabya =

Dibaratrir Kabya
- Directed by: Bimal Bhowmik; Narayan Chakraborty
- Story by: Manik Bandopadhyay
- Based on: Diba Ratrir Kabya
- Starring: Madhabi Mukherjee; Anjana Bhowmik; Basant Choudhury
- Music by: Timir Baran
- Release date: 1970
- Country: India
- Language: Bengali

Dibaratrir Kabya (Bangla: দিবারাত্রির কাব্য Dibārātrir kābbo) is a 1970 Bengali black-and-white film starring Madhabi Mukherjee, Anjana Bhowmik and Basant Choudhury in the lead roles. The film was directed by Bimal Bhowmik and Narayan Chakraborty. The film won two National Film Awards at the 17th National Film Awards. It was based on the novel of the same name by Manik Bandyopadhyay.

== Cast ==
- Madhabi Mukherjee
- Anjana Bhowmick
- Basant Choudhury
- Anubha Gupta
- Kanu Banerjee

== Music ==
- "Bhora Thaak Milone Utsober Gaan" - Sumitra Sen (composer: Rabindranath Tagore)

== Awards ==
- National Film Award for Second Best Feature Film.
- National Film Award for Best Actress – Madhabi Mukherjee
