= Arundhati Holme Chowdhury =

Bengali Indian singer

- অরুন্ধতী হোম চৌধুরী
- Born: Agartala, Tripura, India
- Occupation: Singer
- Spouse: Shibaji Chatterjee (m. 1987)

Arundhati Holme Chowdhury, also spelt as Arundhati Holme (Hom) Choudhury, is a Bengali Indian exponent of Rabindra Sangeet and Bengali songs. She has worked as a playback singer mostly in Bengali-language films.

== Selected filmography ==
- Dadar Kirti (1980)
- Bhalobasa Bhalobasa (1985)
- Pathbhola (1986)
- Bidrohi (1987)
- Gayak (1987)
- Anjali (1988)
- Chhoto Bou (1988)
- Aagaman (1988)
- Shatarupa (1989)
- Byabadhan (1990)
- Path O Prasad (1991)
- Abhagini (1991)
- Neelimay Neel (1991)
- Nabab (1991)
- Indrajit (1992)
- Surer Bhubane (1992)
- Prithibir Shesh Station (1993)
- Maya Mamata (1993)
- Shilpi (1994)
- Kothachilo (1994)
- Geet Sangeet (1994)
- Kakababu Here Gelen? (1995)
- Puja (1996)
- Naach Nagini Naach Re (1996)
- Mukhyamantri (1996)
- Damu (1996)
- Himghar (1996)
- Baro Bou (1997)
- Alo (2003)

== Selected albums ==
- Kumud Kavya Geeti (1983)
- Hridayer Eto Gaan (1991)
- Mor Bina Kon Sure Baji (2004)
- Mone Pare (2010)
- Tomari Smriti Sudhaye (2020)

== Awards ==
- Several BFJA Awards including Best Female Playback Singer in 1975, 1986 and 2007
- Banga Bhushan (2018)

== See also ==
- List of Indian playback singers
- Bengal Film Journalists' Association – Best Female Playback Award
- Prabhat Samgiita
