= Kokhono Megh =

- Theatrical poster
- Directed by: Agradoot
- Screenplay by: Prashanta Deb
- Dialogues by: Ajit Chatterjee; Prashanta Deb
- Story by: Prasanta Deb
- Produced by: Bibhuti Laha; Shiv Narayan Dutta
- Starring: Uttam Kumar; Anjana Bhowmik; Kali Banerjee; Jahar Roy; Kamu Mukherjee
- Cinematography: Bibhuti Laha
- Edited by: Baidyanath Chatterjee
- Music by: Sudhin Dasgupta
- Production company: Chalacchitra Bharti
- Distributed by: Deluxe Film Distributors
- Release date: 12 December 1968
- Running time: 117 minutes
- Country: India
- Language: Bengali

Kokhono Megh is a 1968 Bengali-language black comedy action thriller film directed by Agradoot. Produced by Bibhuti Laha and Shiv Narayan Dutta under the banner of Chalacchitra Bharati in their second production, the film is loosely inspired by the Cary Grant starrer American film Charade (1963). It stars Uttam Kumar, Anjana Bhowmik and Kali Banerjee in lead roles.

== Plot ==
While on vacation at Darjeeling, art teacher Seema Roy meets a charming stranger named Narayan Chowdhury. This pair builds friendship. When she returns home, she find that her apartment has been vandalized and was told by the police that her estranged uncle Suresh had been killed. Police informs her that Suresh was involved with a smuggling racket. She lets them know that they knew very little about this uncle as her father and Suresh drifted away when she was a child. He starts to reach out only after her father died a few years back. Police asks her to keep all of Suresh's belongings as the next if kin but she takes only a framed picture of Suresh and his brother, i.e. her father.

Narayan returns to the city and Seema finds solace in his company. They start to meet often. Some people start following her around wherever she goes.

A person called Pritish Neogi from CID meets Seema and informs her that Suresh was involved in diamond smuggling, most probably killed someone and ran off with some very valuable diamonds after betraying his partners in the gang. The other gang members killed Suresh for the diamonds and now are following Seema. Police as well as the gang members believe that Suresh had given the diamonds to Seema for safekeeping. Seema lets him know that they met only couple of times in recent times and he did not give her anything. Mr Neogi asks Seema to still search her home thoroughly as he believes it is possible that Suresh hid those diamonds in her house while he visited at the time of her vacation. Seema agrees.

The other gang members threaten Seema asking for the hidden diamonds despite her multiple denials about any knowledge of them. Narayan keeps courting her and Seema starts to fall for him. One day when one of the gang members, Badru, attacks Seema, Narayan saves her while Badru flees.

Narayan keeps an watch on Seema's apartment at night and while doing so, he is abducted by the gang members who ask him about the whereabouts of the diamonds. Narayan tells them he knows nothing and he was just trying to keep an eye on Seema because he loves her. The gang members keep him tied up and two of them except Badru pay a visit to Seema to intimidate her. Seema informs them again that she received nothing from Suresh except the photo of her father. The little boy from her downstair neighbors tells them that her uncle came looking for Seema while she was in Darjeeling and left a Buddha statue at their place. The two of them leave with the statue.

Narayan finds a cigarette case and lighter where he was tied and manages to use the lighter to burn the rope and free himself. Seema gets frustrated with the menaces and decides she will get rid of everything received from her uncle and just cut her fathers photo from the frame for keepsake. While opening the photoframe, she finds the diamonds hidden in the crevices of the frame. She calls Mr Neogy to inform him about it. He in turn informs her that Narayan is not who he claims to be. Background verification at his office revealed that they have no employee of that name. Therefore he is a danger to her as well, certainly not to be trusted. He asks her to bring those diamonds to him at once to avoid any possible danger. When Narayan flees the gang members den and reaches Seema's house, he gets to know she left for Mr Neogy's place. He leaves for the same address immediately.

Mr. Neogi is revealed to be a goon who tries to kill Seema after getting the diamonds. Narayan reaches right in time to protect her and after much scuffle manages to kill him.

Seema is taken to the police headquarters and informed that the person claiming to be Mr Neogi was the fourth member of the gang who killed the diamond merchant, Suresh and Badru. Narayan is revealed to be a police officer called Ashok. Seema and Ashok hint of getting married.

== Cast ==
- Uttam Kumar as CID Inspector Ashok Mukherjee / Narayan Chowdhury (in disguise)
- Anjana Bhowmik as Seema
- Kali Banerjee
- Robin Banerjee
- Nripati Chattopadhyay
- Subrata Chatterjee
- Kamu Mukherjee
- Shiven Banerjee
- Ardhendu Bhattacharya
- Shakti Bhattacharya
- Amar Biswas
- Beena Biswas
- Indulekha Chatterjee
- Raja Chatterjee
- Bimal Das
- Nilima Das
- Sudhir Das
- Arindam Gangopadhyay

== Soundtrack ==
All music is composed by Sudhin Dasgupta.

song title
No.	Title	singer(s)	Length
1.	"Ek Dui Teen"	Manna Dey	3:15
2.	"Hariye Jete Jete"	Aarti Mukherjee	2:44
3.	"Sob Dushtu Chhelerai"	Aarti Mukherjee	3:21
4.	"Tomay Dekhe Chhobi Enje"	Aarti Mukherjee	3:06
Total length:			12:26
