= Kankantala Light Railway =

- Directed by: Premendra Mitra
- Story by: Premendra Mitra
- Starring: Gurudas Bandyopadhyay; Dhiraj Bhattacharya; Bikash Roy; Jahar Ganguly
- Cinematography: Sushanta Maitra
- Edited by: Kamal Gangopadhyay
- Music by: Krishnachandra Dey
- Production company: M. P. Productions
- Distributed by: Deluxe Film Distributors
- Release date: 7 July 1950
- Country: India
- Language: Bengali

Kankantala Light Railway is a Bengali drama film directed by Premendra Mitra based on a story written by Mitra himself. The film was released on 7 July 1950 under the banner of Deluxe Film Distributors. This is the debut film of actress Madhabi Mukherjee as a child artist.

== Plot ==
The film revolves with the life of Kunja Babu, a station master of Light railway company and his adopted daughter Shibani. He found Shibani and raising her as his own child. As an employee of the Light Railway, he is at odds with local bus owners. Shibani struck up a friendship with the son of Kunja's friend, but when Kunja babu discovered her biological parents, he sent her to them. However, Shibani could not find happiness in this.

== Cast ==
- Bikash Roy
- Dhiraj Bhattacharya
- Gurudas Bandyopadhyay
- Jahar Ganguly
- Sobha Sen
- Madhabi Mukherjee
- Nabadwip Haldar
- Kabita Sarkar
- Prabha Devi
- Krishnadhan Mukhopadhyay
- Menaka Devi
