= Anjana Bhowmick =

Indian actress (1944–2024)

- Born: Arati Bhowmik; 30 December 1944; Cooch Behar State, British India
- Died: 17 February 2024 (aged 79); Kolkata, West Bengal, India
- Occupation: Actress
- Years active: 1964–1987
- Spouse: Anil Sharma
- Children: Nilanjana Sengupta; Chandana Sharma
- Relatives: Jisshu Sengupta (son-in-law)

Anjana Bhowmik (30 December 1944 – 17 February 2024) was an Indian actress of Bengali cinema from the 1960s until the 1980s.

== Personal life ==
Bhowmik was born in Cooch Behar on 30 December 1944. Her real name was Arati Bhowmik and nickname Babli. Her father was Bibhuti Bhusan Bhowmik. She spent her school days in Cooch Behar. Bhowmik passed the Higher Secondary Exam of the West Bengal Board from Suniti Academy of Cooch Behar in 1961. After that she studied in Sarojini Naidu College for Women, under the University of Calcutta. Anjana married a naval officer, Anil Sharma, and settled in Mumbai. Her daughters are Nilanjana Sharma and Chandana Sharma, who are also actresses. Nilanjana Sharma is married to Bengali actor Jisshu Sengupta.

Bhowmick died on 17 February 2024, at the age of 79.

== Career ==
Bhowmick made her film debut at the age of 20 in the 1964 film Anustup Chanda directed by Pijush Bose. Before releasing the film she changed her name to Anjana from Arati. She became popular with the release of her first film. Her acting talent was praised by both audiences and critics. She became one of the major heroines of Uttam Kumar. She and Uttam Kumar gave major hits like Chowringhee, "Kokhono Megh", "Nayika Sangbad", "Roudra Chhaya", "Raj Drohi". At a certain time of her career when critics predicted she wouldn't be successful without Uttam Kumar as hero, she paired with Soumitra Chattopadhyay in the highly acclaimed "Mahashweta".

== Filmography ==
Year	Title	Role
1964	Anustup Chhanda	
1965	Thana Theke Aschi	Sheela (Chandra Madhab's Daughter)
1966	Griha Sandhane	
1966	Rajodrohi	Chinta
1967	Mahashweta	
1967	Nayika Sangbad	Urmila/Gita
1968	Chowringhee (film)	Sujata Mitra
1968	Kokhono Megh	Seema Roy (Art Teacher)
1969	Shuk Sari	
1970	Dibratrir Kabya	
1971	Pratham Basanta	
1973	Roudra Chhaya	
1979	Bhagyalipi	
1981	Shukhe Thako	
1987	Nishibasar	
