= Ratnaboli Ray =

- Occupations: Clinical psychologist, mental health activist
- Known for: Founder of Anjali; mental health advocacy

Ratnaboli Ray is an Ashoka Fellow, trained clinical psychologist and mental health activist who is the founder of Anjali, a rights based organisation based in Kolkata, West Bengal, which works for persons with mental health condition and or psychosocial disability. She is a leading figure in the mental health movement in India.

She was awarded the Human Rights Watch's Alison Des Forges Award for Extraordinary Activism. She has been recognised as powerful impact woman by Business Today. She was awarded Times Woman Hero by Times Of India.
