= Bengal Film Journalists' Association – Best Female Playback Award =

Indian film award

BFJA award for Best Female Playback Singer was first awarded in 1965. Sandhya Mukherjee won that for Sandhyadeeper Shikha. Aarti Mukherjee is the most awarded artists with 4 wins. Arundhati Holme Chowdhury and Pratima Mukherjee have 3 wins each. Singers who have won this award two times are: Sandhya Mukherjee, Lata Mangeshkar, Indrani Sen and Shreya Ghoshal. Lata Mangeshkar, Asha Bhosle, K S Chithra, Alka Yagnik, Jayita Pandey and Kavita Krishnamurthy are the only non-Bengali singers to win this award. Sabina Yasmin from Bangladesh is the only non-Indian singer to win it.

Here is a list of the award winners and the films for which they won.

Year	Singer	Film
2013	Lopamudra Mitra	Hemlock Society
2009	Lopamudra Mitra	Sedin Chaitra Mash
2007	Arundhati Holme Chowdhury	Bhalobasar Anek Naam
2006	Shreya Ghoshal	Subho Drishti
2005	Shreya Ghoshal	Shudhu Tumi
2004	Jayita Pandey	Chokher Bali
2003	Haimanti Sukla	Gandharbi
2002	Srabani Sen	Utsab
2001	Madhura Dasgupta	Paromitar Ekdin
2000
1999	Swagatalakshmi Dasgupta
1998
1997	Kavita Krishnamurthy	Joy Bijoy
1996	Sreeradha Bandyopadhyay	Boumoni
1995	Indrani Sen	Sandhya Tara
1994	K S Chithra	Naga Panchami
1993	Indrani Sen	Shwet Patharer Thala
1992	Sabina Yasmin	Sajani Go Sajani
1991
1990
1989	Aarti Mukherjee	Madhuban
1988	Lata Mangeshkar	Amar Sangee
1987	Sujata Sarkar	Pathbhola
1986	Arundhati Holme Chowdhury	Bhalobasa Bhalobasa
1985
1984
1983
1982
1981
1980
1979
1978
1977
1976	Aarti Mukherjee	Chhutir Phande
1975	Arundhati Holme Chowdhury	Je Jekhane Danriye
1974	Lata Mangeshkar	Banpalashir Padabali
1973	Kanika Banerjee	Bigalita Karuna Janhabi Jamuna
1972	Sandhya Mukherjee	Joy Jayanti
1971	Asha Bhosle	Megh Kalo
1970	Pratima Banerjee	Parineeta
1969	Pratima Banerjee	Chowrangee
1968	Pratima Banerjee	Chhuti
1967	Aarti Mukherjee	Golpo Holeo Satyi
1966	Aarti Mukherjee	Ashru Diye Lekha
1965	Sandhya Mukherjee	Sandhyadeeper Shikha
1964
1963
1962
1961
1960
1959
1958
1957
1956
1955
1954
1953
1952
1951
1950
1949
1948
1947
1946
1945
1944
1943
1942

== See also ==
- Bengal Film Journalists' Association Awards
- Cinema of India
