= Birendra Krishna Bhadra =

Indian broadcaster and writer

- Birendra Krishna Bhadra
- Born: 4 August 1905; Ahiritola, Calcutta, Bengal Presidency, British India
- Died: 3 November 1991 (aged 86); Calcutta, West Bengal, India
- Occupations: Broadcaster, Playwright, Actor, Theater Director
- Known for: Mahishasura Mardini (1931)

Birendra Krishna Bhadra (1905–1991) was an Indian radio broadcaster, playwright, actor, narrator and theatre director from Calcutta West Bengal and a contemporary of Pankaj Mallick and Kazi Nazrul Islam. He worked for the All India Radio, India's national radio broadcaster for several years during its early, starting 1930s, and during this period he produced and adapted several plays.

Today, he is most known for his soaring Sanskrit recitation and India's oldest radio show, Mahishashura Mardini (1931), a collection of shlokas and songs broadcast by All India Radio Calcutta (now Kolkata) at 4:00 am, in the dawn of Mahalaya. He also acted and directed several plays in Bengali theatre and even wrote the screenplay for the film, Nishiddha Phal (1955). A Bengali short film Birendra Krishna Bhadra - The Voice Since 1936 was released in 2019 By Haalum Digital Media Entertainment Pvt. Ltd.

== Early life and education ==
Birendra Krishna Bhadra was born on 4 August 1905, to Roy Bahadur Kalikrishna Bhadra and Sarala Bala Devi at a rented house in Ahiritola his maternal home, in north Calcutta (now Kolkata)."His ancestral home is in Uthali village under Islamkati Union of Tala Upazila in Satkhira district of Bangladesh." Later the family moved to 7, Ramdhan Mitra Lane, the house bought by his grandmother Yogo Maya Devi. Bhadra was a Kayastha. His father, Kali Krishna Bhadra was a linguist, fluent in 14 languages, and employed as an interpreter in a lower court and later became a known figure in the Bengali literary circles of the time. Kali Krishna married Sarala Bala Devi the second child of the then famous Police Court lawyer Kalicharan Ghosh, and in 1927 was awarded the title of Roy Bahadur. Roy Bahadur Kali Krishna had two sons, Bhupendra Krishna and Birendra Krishna. In 1926, Birendra Krishna Bhadra passed Intermediate, and in 1928 graduated from Scottish Church College, Kolkata.

== Career ==
He adapted and restructured several classics to produce notable radio plays. In the 1930s All India Radio, Kolkata started broadcasting a 1 hour 30 minutes program called Mahishashura Mardini which describes the epic battle of goddess Durga with the demon king Mahishashura. The script of this program was written by Bani Kumar and the music was directed by Pankaj Kumar Mallik. It was recited by Bhadra. It was first broadcast on the Mahalaya of 1931. Since then, All India Radio have broadcast this programme on the Mahalaya of every year except 1976. The programme, which started off as a live-performance, has been broadcast in its pre-recorded format since 1952.

Bhadra wrote some plays including Mess No. 49, and directed a theatre production Sahib Bibi Gulam, a stage adaptation of the celebrated novel of famous author, the Bimal Mitra. In 1952, he dramatised Bankim Chandra Chattopadhyay's novel Subarna Golak which was filmed in the same name in 1981. He also produced the famous radio drama Shahjahan, based on an eponymous historical play by Dwijendralal Ray. Chhabi Biswas played Shahjahan in that radio drama. It became immensely popular among the masses and is still considered as a classic Bengali Radio-drama. He also adapted many well known plays like Chandragpta (written by Dwijendralal Ray) and Prafulla (written by Girish Chandra Ghosh) in radio drama format. He reinstated the Durga temple in 1347 Bangabde in Uthali village of Tala upazila of Satkhira district of Bangladesh. Durga Puja is still going on in the temple.

== Legacy ==
His rendition, Mahisasura Mardini, is still played by All India Radio, every Mahalaya, marking the beginning of Durga Puja festivities. So popular was his version of the recitation that when in 1976, the voice of noted Bengali actor, Uttam Kumar was employed for the programme, it didn't get a favourable response from the audience and it was shifted back to the original version of Birendra Krishna Bhadra.

Subhasish Mukherjee portrayed him in his biopic Mahalaya, written and directed by Soumik Sen, highlighting the 1976 fiasco. Jisshu Sengupta portrayed the role of Uttam Kumar.

On the Mahalaya day in 2006, Sujata Bhadra, daughter of the late Birendra Krishna Bhadra, got a cheque for Rs 50,917 from music company, Saregama India Ltd as a royalty for her father's famous work.

== Works ==
- Hitopadesa, Publisher: Hanthawaddy publication, 1948.
- Bisvarūpa-darśana. Publisher: Kathakali, 1963.
- Rana-berana, Publisher: Bihar Sahitya Bhavan, 1965.
- Bratakathā samagra, Publisher: Mandala end Sansa, 1985.
- Śrīmadbhagabata: sampurna dvādaśa skandha, with Upendracandra Śāstri. Publisher: Mandala eyāṇḍa Sansa, 1990.
- Garstin Place er Saheb Bhoot

=== Plays ===
- Blackout
- Sat Tulsi 1940
- He wrote a script of a Bengali movie name mahishasur vadh
