= Samapti Chatterjee =

Former judge of Calcutta High Court

Hon'ble Justice (Retd.) Samapti Chatterjee

Judge of Calcutta High Court
- In office 30 October 2013 – 12 December 2020
- Nominated by: P. Sathasivam
- Appointed by: Pranab Mukherjee

Personal details
- Born: 13 December 1958 (age 67)
- Education: University of Calcutta

Samapti Chatterjee (born 13 December 1958) is a former judge of the Calcutta High Court in West Bengal, India. She gained public attention after quashing a no-confidence motion passed against the mayor of Bidhannagar, West Bengal, in a widely reported hearing, during which she faced a temporary boycott of her court by government lawyers.

== Life ==
Chatterjee earned a Bachelor of Arts from Gokhale Memorial College and a law degree from Calcutta University.

== Career ==
Chatterjee enrolled with the Bar Council of West Bengal in 1985 and practiced law at the Calcutta High Court, as well as other courts and tribunals. She was appointed as an additional judge of the Calcutta High Court on 30 October 2013, and her appointment was made permanent on 14 March 2016.

In 2014, Chatterjee's vehicle was struck by an autorickshaw in traffic. She filed a police complaint against the driver, but also ordered the police to produce the driver in her private chambers in the Calcutta High Court. She ordered the Calcutta police to take certain actions against the driver, but the police released him on bail in accordance with the law.

In July 2019, Chatterjee heard a case concerning the legality of a notice calling for a motion of no confidence that had been issued against Sabyasachi Dutta, the mayor of Bidhanagar. During the hearing, Chatterjee raised the issue of political violence between the Bharatiya Janata Party and the Trinamool Congress, criticizing the latter. In response, Chatterjee's lawyer questioned her appointment as a judge, and suggested the possibility of financial irregularities. Chatterjee denied the allegations. Later, the lawyer privately apologized to Chatterjee for her comments. The conversation was widely reported in national news media. During the course of the hearing, several lawyers representing the West Bengal government briefly boycotted her court, although the boycott was eventually called off. Chatterjee eventually ruled to cancel the no-confidence motion, holding that it had been unlawfully passed. She was Retired on 12 December 2020.
