= Sumitra Sen =

Indian Bengali singer (1933–2023)

Sumitra Sen (7 March 1933 – 3 January 2023) was an Indian Bengali singer and an exponent of Rabindra Sangeet. Her rendition style popularised Tagore's songs without losing the original notations.

== Career ==
Sen started her singing career in 1951 with two Nazrulgeetis, 'Gother rakhal bole de re' and 'Bedonar bedi tole'. Her famous songs include one with Pratima Banerjee, 'Aamtalay jhamur jhumur'. She also sang folk songs. But she is known for her Rabindra Sangeet renditions, which carved a niche for her. She recorded over 150 Tagore songs. She also lent her voice to popular stage productions like Shyama, Shaapmochon, Balmiki Pratibha, and Barshamangal, as well as to 16 movies in Tollywood. Her rendition of 'Mago tobo bine sangeeto premo lalito' for Pankaj Mullick's 'Mahisashuramardini' created history said Jayati Chakraborty, another well-known Bengali singer in an obit in Times of India. She was associated with institutes of eminence related to Tagore like the Rabindra Bharati University and many others.

== Death and legacy ==
Sen died at her Ballygunge home on 3 January 2023, at the age of 89. She was survived by her two daughters, Indrani and Sraboni, who are also well-known Bengali singers. At the time of her death she had been suffering from broncho-pneumonia issues for some time. She had many students and followers. West Bengal Chief Minister Mamata Banerjee expressed condolences to the bereaved family.

== Awards ==
- Sen was awarded Sangeet Mahasamman by West Bengal government in 2012.
- Sangeet Natak Academy award for lifetime contribution.

== Book ==
Smritisudhaay. (2016) Memoirs of Sumitra Sen.
