= Madhabi Mukherjee =

Indian actress

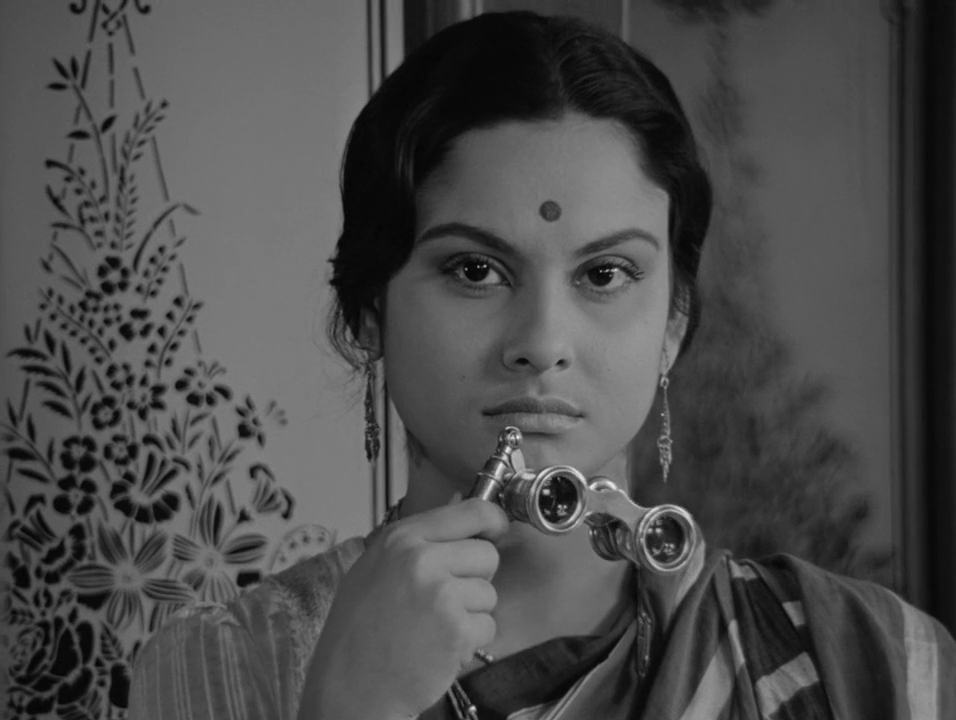
- Mukherjee in Charulata (1964)
- Born: Madhuri Mukherjee; 10 February 1940 (age 86); Calcutta, Bengal Presidency, British India (present-day Kolkata, West Bengal, India)
- Years active: 1950—present
- Notable work: Charulata; Mahanagar; Subarnarekha
- Spouse: Nirmal Kumar (m. 1968)
- Children: 2
- Parents: Shailendranath Mukherjee (father); Leela Mukherjee (mother)

Madhabi Chakraborty (née Mukherjee; born 10 February 1940) is an Indian actress. Considered one of the finest actresses of Bengali cinema, she has acted in some its most critically acclaimed films. She won the National Film Award for Best Actress for her performance in the Bengali film Dibratrir Kabya.

She made her on-screen debut in Premendra Mitra's Kankantala Light Railway (1950). Her first leading role came with Tapan Sinha's Tonsil (1956). Her name was later changed into "Madhabi" by Mrinal Sen in his Baishe Sraban (1960).

== Early life ==
Madhabi was born on 10 February 1940, to advocate Shailendranath Mukherjee and thespian actress Leela Mukherjee. After her parents separated, she and her elder sister Manjari were brought up by her mother in Kolkata, in what was then Bengal, India. As a young girl, she became involved in the theater.

She worked on stage with doyens such as Sisir Bhaduri, Ahindra Choudhury, Nirmalendu Lahiri and Chhabi Biswas. Some of the plays she acted in included Naa and Kalarah. She made her film debut as a child artist in Premendra Mitra's Dui beaee.

== Early stage of career (1950-1962) ==
Mukherjee made a major impact with Mrinal Sen's Baishey Shravan (Wedding Day) in 1960. The film is set in a Bengal village before and during the horrific famine of 1943 in Bengal that saw over 5 million die. Mukherjee plays a 16-year-old girl who marries a middle-aged man. Initially, she brightens his life but then World War II and the Bengal Famine hits them. The couple's marriage disintegrates.

Her next major film was Ritwik Ghatak's Subarnarekha (The Golden Thread ) made in 1962, but released in 1965 – the last in a trilogy examining the socio-economic implications of partition, the other two being Meghe Dhaka Tara (The Cloud-Capped Star) (1960) and Komal Gandhar (E-Flat) (1961). In the film, Ghatak depicts the economic and socio-political crisis of Bengal from 1948 to 1962; how the crisis has first and foremost left one bereft of one's conscience. Mukherjee plays Sita, the younger sister of Ishwar (Abhi Bhattacharya), who kills herself when—as a prostitute waiting for her first customer—she finds out the customer is none other than her estranged brother.

== Collaboration with Satyajit Ray (1963-1965) ==
In the early 1960s, she was recruited by Satyajit Ray to portray the role of Arati in the 1963 film Mahanagar (The Big City).

Recalling her meeting with Ray, Mukherjee wrote:

He read me the entire story, Mahanagar. I was stunned. This was the first woman-centered screenplay I had encountered. I was not going to play second fiddle to the main male character as in all plays and films I had acted in or was familiar with. (p.20)

In Mahanagar, Mukherjee plays Arati, who takes a job as a saleswoman due to financial constraints in the family. The large joint family is horrified at the thought of a working woman. For Arati, going door to door selling knitting machines opens up a whole new world and new friends and acquaintances, including an Anglo-Indian friend, Edith. Earning money also raises Arati's status in the family especially when her husband (Anil Chatterjee) loses his job. When Edith is sacked unfairly, Arati resigns in protest...Mukherjee's towering performance as Arati dominates the film. Film critic Roger Ebert wrote: "It might be useful to see the performance of Madhabi Mukherjee in this film. She is a beautiful deep, wonderful actress who simply surpasses all ordinary standards of judgment."

This film was followed by her portrayals of Charu in Charulata (The Lonely Wife), the 1964 film based on Rabindranath Tagore's novella Nashtanir (The Broken Nest, 1901). Mukherjee's stunning portrayal of Charulata, a bored and neglected housewife of Calcutta in the 19th century, is a towering performance in the history of Indian cinema.

Mukherjee reached the peak of her career with this film. It is said that when Ray returned to Tagore with Ghare Baire (1984) (The Home and the World), he stylised Swatilekha Chatterjee in a manner similar to Madhabi in Charulata.

Mukherjee's third and last film with Ray was Kapurush (The Coward) in 1965. The film looks at Amitabha Roy (Soumitra Chatterjee), a screenwriter whose car breaks down in a small town. He lodges with a local resident, Bimal Gupta (Haradhan Bannerjee). Bimal is married to Karuna (Mukherjee), who was a former girlfriend of Amitabha, a fact of which Bimal is unaware.

== After Satyajit Ray ==
Although she remained a big star in the Bengali commercial film industry, after Kapurush, Mukherjee failed to reach the critical heights as her films with Ritwik Ghatak and Satyajit Ray again.

Her major films after Kapurush include Calcutta 71 in 1972 by Mrinal Sen, Biraj Bou in 1972 by Manu Sen, Strir Patra in 1972 by Purnendu Patri, Ganadevata in 1978 by Tarun Majumdar, Bancharamer Bagan in 1980 by Tapan Sinha, Chokh in 1982, Chhandaneer in 1989 by Utpalendu Chakrabarty and Utsab in 2000 by Rituparno Ghosh.

== Personal life ==
Mukherjee is married to Bengali film actor Nirmal Kumar. They have two daughters, but are currently separated.

She wrote her autobiography Ami Madhabi in 1995.

== Filmography ==
Year	Title	Role	Note	Ref.
1950	Kankantala Light Railway			
1950	Mej Didi			
1951	Setu			
1952	Meghmukti			
1953	Dui Beyai			
1956	Asabarna			
1956	Tonsil			
1957	Harishchandra			
1960	Baishey Shravan		Credited as Madhabi Mukherjee for the first time	
1961	Aaj Kal Parshu			
1963	Mahanagar	Arati Mazumder		
1964	Godhuli Belaye			
1964	Binsati Janani			
1964	Charulata	Charulata		
1965	Kapurush	Karuna Gupta		
1965	Ghoom Bhangar Gaan			
1965	Subarnarekha	Sita		
1965	Thana Theke Aschi			
1966	Shankhabela			
1966	Swapna Niye			
1966	Joradighir Chowdhury Paribar			
1967	Kheya			
1967	Ajana Shapath			
1968	Adwitiya			
1968	Garh Nasimpur			
1968	Chhotto Jignasa			
1969	Duranta Charai			
1970	Samantaral			
1970	Dibaratrir Kabya			
1971	Calcutta 71			
1971	Chhadmabeshi	Sulekha		
1972	Chinna Patra			
1972	Biraj Bou			
1972	Jiban Rahasya			
1973	Bindur Chhele	Bindubasini		
1973	Bon Palashir Padabali			
1973	Strir Patra			
1975	Phool Sajya			
1975	Natun Surya			
1975	Agnishwar			
1976	Yugo Manab Kabir			
1979	Ganadevata	Padma		
1980	Bancharamer Bagan	Chhakari's wife		
1981	Subarnalata			
1981	Manikchand	Baroboudi		
1981	Saheb			
1982	Matir Swarga			
1982	Prafulla			
1983	Samapti			
1983	Chhoto Maa			
1983	Chokh			
1984	Jog Biyog			
1985	Bhalobasa Bhalobasa			
1985	Putulghar			
1986	Uttar Lipi			
1986	Anurager Choa			
1987	Pratikar			
1988	Anjali			
1988	Ekti Jiban			
1988	Hirer Shikal			
1989	Agni Trishna			
1989	Chandaneer			
1989	Kari Diye Kinlam			
1989	Aghaton Ajo Ghatey			
1991	Antarer Bhalobasha			
1993	Prithibir Shesh Station			
1993	Mon Mane Na	Dipak's mother		
1993	Daan Pratidaan			
1994	Artikram			
1995	Rangin Basanta			
2000	Utsab	Bhagabati		
2002	Mayer Adar			
2010	Hing Ting Chot			
2013	Bakita Byaktigato			
2018	Kushumitar Gappo			
2019	Borunbabur Bondhu			
2021	Aabesh			

== Television ==
Year	Title	Role
1993	Ranibala	Ranibala
2011 – 2015	Ishti Kutum	Ashapurna
	Hiyar Majhe	
	Chokher Tara Tui	
	Kusum Dola	
	Gachkouto	
	Sanyasi Raja	
	Nokshi Kantha	
	Balijhor	
2024 – 2025	Roshnai	
2025 – present	Bhole Baba Par Karega	Charulata

== Awards and nominations ==
- 2017: WBFJA Lifetime Achievement Award
- 2014: Filmfare East Lifetime achievement award
- 1970: National Film Award for Best Actress for Dibratrir Kabya
- 1965: BFJA Award for Best Actress for Charulata
- 1966: BFJA Award for Best Actress for Dholgobinder Karcha
- 1967: BFJA Award for Best Actress Award for Joradighir Chowdhury Paribar
- 1971: BFJA Award for Best Actress Award for Dibaratir Kabya
- 2012: Kalakar Awards
- 2022: ABP Ananda Sera Bangali Award (Lifetime Achievement)
