= Indrani Sen =

Indian singer

- Origin: Kolkata, West Bengal, India
- Genres: Adhunik Bengali Songs, Nazrul Sangeet, Rabindra Sangeet
- Occupations: Singer, songwriter
- Instrument: vocal
- Years active: 1970–present
- Website: singerindranisen.in

Indrani Sen is an Indian singer who is known for her Bengali Nazrul Geeti and Rabindra Sangeet songs.

== Early life ==
Indrani Sen is the daughter of singer Sumitra Sen, and her younger sister is Srabani Sen. Her earliest singing was done under her mother's guidance; she then attended Bengal Music College at the University of Calcutta, and was later trained by Debabrata Biswas in classical and Purabi Dutta in Nazrul geeti.

She is also the head of the department of economics at Women's College, Calcutta in Kolkata.

Her mother, Sumitra Sen died on 3 January 2023 at the age of 89.

== Awards & achievements ==
Title	Year	Category	Work	Result	Ref.
BFJA Award	1993	Best Female Playback Singer	Shwet Patharer Thala	Won	
BFJA Award	1995	Best Female Playback Singer	Sandhyatara	Won	

She is a playback singer for Hindi films, Bengali films and T. V serials, and the recipient of several awards, including Banga Bhushan from the Government of West Bengal. Sen performed at the joint India and Bangladesh celebrations marking the 150th anniversary of Nobel laureate Rabindranath Tagore at the Indira Gandhi Cultural Centre (IGCC), High Commission of India in 2012.
