= Aarti Mukherjee =

Indian singer (born 1943)

- Also known as: Aarti Mukherji, Arati Mukhopadhyay
- Born: Aarti Mukherjee; 18 July 1943 (age 82); Kolkata, West Bengal, British India
- Genres: Classical music
- Occupation: Singer
- Instrument: Vocals
- Years active: 1961–present

Aarti Mukherjee, also known as Aarti Mukherji or Arati Mukhopadhyay (born 18 July 1943), is an Indian playback singer who has sung in Hindi films such as Geet Gata Chal (1975), Tapasya (1976), Manokamana, Masoom (1983), and Sooraj Mukhi (1992).

== Early life ==
Mukherjee was born in Kolkata, West Bengal, to a Bengali family with a rich cultural and musical heritage. She was introduced to music by her mother. She studied under Shri Susheel Banerjee, Ustaad Mohammed Sagiruddin Khan, Acharya Chinmoy Lahiri, Pandit Laxman Prasad Jaipurwale, and Pandit Ramesh Nadkarni.

She was married to lyricist Subir Hazra, who also assisted Satyajit Ray. Their marriage did not last long and they divorced later. 5 years after the divorce, she remarried a Gujarati businessman from Munim family. She has a son named Soham Munim, who is a talented Sitar player.

== Career ==
She was trained in Indian Classical Music from a young age. She sang primarily for Bengali films. In Bangla TV show Dadagiri she reflected on her early days. She stated that she sang on the All India Music Talent Programme in 1955 at age 14 or 15. She won the music contest, "Metro-Murphy Contest" whose judges were music directors including Anil Biswas, Naushad, Vasant Desai and C. Ramchandra. This enabled her career as a playback singer. She got her first break in 1958 Hindi film Sahara, but the music of that film was limited.

After a string of flops like Boy Friend, she decided to open herself to Bengali films. She sang for the first time in a Bengali film called Kanya in 1962. Her versatility and voice infatuated audiences so much that they started losing affection for erstwhile leading singer Sandhya Mukherjee and Pratima Banerjee . In the late 1960s, her voice was used as the on-screen voice of leading actress Suchitra Sen.

In 1966, she sang in the film Golpo Holeo Sotyi, which earned her BFJA Award for Best Female Playback Singer. In 1976, she won again for Chhutir Phande. She lent her voice for leading actresses of the late sixties till eighties, such as Madhabi Mukherji, Sharmila Tagore, Aparna Sen, Debashri Roy and Tanuja. She, along with Asha Bhosle, took the leading spot in the 1970s.

She sang 'Bacche ho tum khel khilone' and in a duet with Kishore Kumar titled 'Do panchi do tinke'. She is said to have sung 15,000 songs in Bengali and Hindi. She had success in the 1970s, that inspired her to return to Bollywood. In 1983, R. D. Burman, who was the mentor of Bengali singers Kumar Sanu, Abhijeet and Andrew Kishore, gave her "Do Naina Ek Kahani" in the film Masoom voicing Shabana Azmi. The song was a chartbuster and is still popular today. It earned her the Filmfare award for best female playback singer in 1983. Her popular repertoire includes 'Radha Banshi Chara Janena', 'Ek Boishakhe Dekha Holo Dujonar', 'Ei Mom Jochonay Ongo Bhijiye', 'Ja Ja Behaya Pakhi Jana', 'Tokhon Tomar Ekush Bochor Bodhoy.' She also has several non-film songs to her credit.

Arati commenced her musical journey in films with Bengali film Subarna Rekha and Hindi film Angulimaal and has, since then, sung thousands of songs in Bengali, Oriya, Manipuri, Assamese, Hindi, Gujarati, Marathi and other languages.

Apart from films, Arati has engaged audiences with albums and live performances on television and stage of Rabindra Sangeet and Nazrul Geeti. Her versatility can be seen in diverse genres of music like Thumri, Bhajan, Tappa, Tarana, and Ghazal. She performed extensively in India and throughout the world.

== Recognition ==
- Bengal Film Journalists Association Award (1965) for Best Female Singer and earned it repeatedly thereafter
- "Miyan Tansen award" of Sur Singar Samsad for her performance in Geet Gata Chal
- Gujarat State Government Awards for three consecutive years for her Gujarati film songs.
- Lifetime Achievement Award from the Orissa Government (2015)
- Lifetime Achievement Award from Times of India Group (2016)
- National Film Award for Best Female Playback Singer
- Filmfare Award for Best Female Playback Singer for the song "Do Naina" in Shekhar Kapur's Masoom.
- Bengal Film Journalists' Association – Best Female Playback Award – 1976 for Chhutir Phande
- Bengal Film Journalists' Association – Best Female Playback Award- 1967 for Golpo Holeo Satyi

== Filmography ==
| Year | Film | Language | Notes |
|---|---|---|---|
| 1958 | Sahara | Hindi | |
| 1960 | Angulimaal | Hindi | |
| 1961 | Boy Friend | Hindi | |
| 1962 | Kanna | Bengali | |
| 1963 | Deya Neya | Bengali | |
| 1965 | Subernarekha | Bengali | |
| 1965 | Do Dil | Hindi | |
| 1965 | Abhaya O Srikanta | Bengali | |
| 1966 | Joradighir Chowdhury Paribar | Bengali | |
| 1967 | Badhu Bharan | Bengali | |
| 1968 | Gar Nasimpur | Bengali | |
| 1969 | The Fiancee | Bengali | |
| 1969 | Teen Bhubaner Pare | Bengali | |
| 1969 | Khamoshi | Hindi | |
| 1970 | Bilambita Lay | Bengali | |
| 1970 | Samantaral | Bengali | |
| 1970 | Manjari Opera | Bengali | |
| 1971 | Aranya | Assamese | |
| 1971 | Manab aru Danab | Assamese | |
| 1971 | Jal Bin Machhli Nritya Bin Bijli | Hindi | |
| 1971 | Dhanyee Meye | Bengali | |
| 1971 | Ghorer Moddhye Ghor | Bengali | |
| 1971 | Kokhono Megh | Bengali | |
| 1971 | Fariad | Bengali | |
| 1972 | Haar Maana Haar | Bengali | |
| 1972 | Brojendrogi Luhongba | Manipuri | |
| 1972 | Bhaiti | Assamese | |
| 1972 | Morichika | Assamese | |
| 1972 | Ajker Nayak | Bengali | |
| 1972 | Andha Atit | Bengali | |
| 1973 | Sriman Prithviraj | Bengali | |
| 1973 | Basanata Bilap | Bengali | |
| 1974 | Alor Thikana | Bengali | |
| 1974 | Bikele Bhorer Phul | Bengali | |
| 1975 | Chhutir Phande | Bengali | |
| 1976 | Tapasya | Hindi | |
| 1976 | Harmonium | Bengali | |
| 1976 | Hangsaraj | Bengali | |
| 1976 | Nidhiram Sardar | Bengali | |
| 1977 | Solah Shukrawar | Hindi | |
| 1977 | Phir Janam Lenge Hum/Janam Janam Na Saathi (1977) | Hindi/Gujarati | |
| 1977 | Anand Ashram | Bengali | |
| 1977 | Baba Taraknath | Bengali | |
| 1978 | Ganga Ki Saugand | Hindi | |
| 1978 | Saajan Bina Suhagan | Hindi | |
| 1979 | Nagin Aur Suhagan | Hindi | |
| 1979 | Ashaati Beej | Gujrati | |
| 1979 | Ganadevata | Bengali | |
| 1979 | Taraana | Hindi | |
| 1980 | Megha Mukti | Oriya | |
| 1980 | Baata Abaata | Oriya | |
| 1980 | Manokaamnaa | Hindi | |
| 1976 | Geet Gaata Chal | Hindi | |
| 1980 | Ek Baar Kaho | Hindi | |
| 1980 | Dadar Kirti | Bengali | |
| 1981 | Dustu Misti | Bengali | |
| 1981 | Ulka | Oriya | |
| 1981 | Tike Hasa Tike Luha | Oriya | |
| 1981 | Surya Sakshi | Bengali | |
| 1982 | Rajbadhu | Bengali | |
| 1983 | Masoom | Hindi | Filmfare Award for Best Female Playback Singer |
| 1983 | Desire | Oriya | |
| 1983 | Aashar Akash | Oriya | |
| 1983 | Amar Geeti | Bengali | |
| 1983 | Rang Birangi | Hindi | |
| 1983 | Indira | Bengali | |
| 1984 | Shatru | Bengali | |
| 1985 | Ram Tere Kitne Nam | Hindi | |
| 1985 | Rusvai | Hindi | |
| 1985 | Lallu Ram | Hindi | |
| 1991 | Pyaar Ka Saawan | Hindi | |
| 1992 | Sooraj Mukhi | Hindi | |

== Bengali songs ==
=== Film songs ===
| Year | Film | Song | Composer(s) | Writer(s) | Co-artist(s) |
|---|---|---|---|---|---|
| 1963 | Deya Neya | "Madhobi Modhupe" | Shyamal Mitra | Gauriprasanna Mazumdar | solo |
| 1966 | Sankha Bela | "Aji Jhoro Jhoro Mukhoro" | Rabindranath Tagore, Sudhin Dasgupta | | solo |
| 1967 | Ajana Shapath | "Mone Rekhe More" | Hemanta Mukherjee | Pulak Banerjee, Miltoo Ghosh | solo |
| 1967 | Ajana Shapath | "Ogo Bondhu Amar" | Hemanta Mukherjee | Miltoo Ghosh | solo |
| 1967 | Miss Priyambada | "Se Ki Tobe Tumi Ogo" | Azad Rahman and Subir Sen | Shankar Bhattacharya | Manabendra Mukherjee |
| 1967 | Miss Priyambada | "O Shalik Amay De Nare" | Azad Rahman and Subir Sen | Shankar Bhattacharya | solo |
| 1968 | Gar Nasimpur | "Ogo Sundor" | Shyamal Mitra | | solo |
| 1968 | Gar Nasimpur | "Borsha Je Elo" | Shyamal Mitra | | solo |
| 1968 | Gar Nasimpur | "Tuhun Chandra Mor" | Shyamal Mitra | | Shyamal Mitra |
| 1968 | Kokhono Megh | "Sob Dushtu Chhelerai" | Sudhin Dasgupta | | solo |
| 1968 | Kokhono Megh | "Hariye Jete Jete" | Sudhin Dasgupta | | solo |
| 1968 | Kokhono Megh | "Tomay Dekhe Chhobi Enke" | Sudhin Dasgupta | | solo |
| 1969 | Duti Mon | "Ore O Jharna" | Hemanta Mukherjee | Pulak Banerjee | solo |
| 1969 | Teen Bhubaner Pare | "Dure Dure Kachhe Kachhe" | | | solo |
| 1969 | Teen Bhubaner Pare | "Keno Ek Chena Pothe" | | | solo |
| 1970 | Bilambita Loy | "Ek Boishakhe Dekha Holo Dujonay" | Nachiketa Ghosh | Pulak Banerjee | solo |
| 1970 | Bilambita Loy | "Anka Banka Pathe Jodi | Nachiketa Ghosh | Pulak Banerjee | solo |
| 1970 | Bilambita Loy | "Sona Roder Gaan" | Nachiketa Ghosh | Pulak Banerjee | solo |
| 1970 | Bilambita Loy | "Bendhona Phulomala Dore" | Nachiketa Ghosh | Pulak Banerjee | Manna Dey" |
| 1970 | Bilambita Loy | "Taap Chare To" | Nachiketa Ghosh | Pulak Banerjee | Manna Dey" |
| 1970 | Ruposhi | "Kheli Je Lukochuri" | Shyamal Mitra | | solo |
| 1970 | Ruposhi | "Kokila Re O Tui Emon Kore" | Shyamal Mitra | | solo |
| 1970 | Ruposhi | "Namo Namo Sabbojan" | Shyamal Mitra | | solo |
| 1970 | Ruposhi | "O Sujyi Alo De" | Shyamal Mitra | | Shyamal Mitra, chorus |
| 1970 | Sagina Mahato | "Bhalobeshe Bhashore Bhalo" | Tapan Sinha | Shyamal Gupta, Hemen Ganguly | Anup Ghoshal, Pintoo Bhattacharya |
| 1970 | Sagina Mahato | "Chhoti Si Panchhi" | Tapan Sinha | Shyamal Gupta, Hemen Ganguly | Anup Ghoshal |
| 1971 | Dhanyi Meye | "Bou Kotha Kou" | Nachiketa Ghosh | Pulak Banerjee | solo |
| 1971 | Shakuntala | "Jaage Chand Jaage Go" | Kalipada Sen | Saral Guha | Manabendra Mukherjee |
| 1971 | Shakuntala | "Modhur Modhur Baaje Beena" | Kalipada Sen | Saral Guha | chorus |
| 1972 | Andha Atit | "Aha Neel Neel Taragulo" | Shyamal Mitra | Gauriprasanna Mazumdar | Shyamal Mitra |
| 1973 | Basanta Bilap | "Ami Miss Calcutta" | Sudhin Dasgupta | Pulak Banerjee | solo |
| 1973 | Basanta Bilap | "Ek Choretei Thanda" | Sudhin Dasgupta | Pulak Banerjee | solo |
| 1973 | Basanta Bilap | "O Shyam Jokhon Tokhon" | Sudhin Dasgupta | Pulak Banerjee | Sujata Banerjee |
| 1974 | Fuleswari | "Shunun Shunun Babumoshai" | Hemanta Mukherjee | Pulak Banerjee | solo |
| 1974 | Fuleswari | "Hay Hay Hay Hay" | Hemanta Mukherjee | Pulak Banerjee | Sandhya Mukherjee |
| 1975 | Aparajita | "Ekti Mayer Shopno Chhilo" | Sudhin Dasgupta | | solo |
| 1975 | Hongsoraaj | "O Babumoshai" | Sudhin Dasgupta | | solo |
| 1975 | Hongsoraaj | "Are Bahare Baha" | Sudhin Dasgupta | | solo |
| 1975 | Hongsoraaj | "O Didimoni" | Sudhin Dasgupta | | solo |
| 1975 | Hongsoraaj | "Chol Apon Mone" | Sudhin Dasgupta | | solo |
| 1975 | Hongsoraaj | "O Shamu Shyam Re" | Sudhin Dasgupta | | solo |
| 1975 | Hongsoraaj | "O Boro Koshto Ami Pelam" | Sudhin Dasgupta | | solo |
| 1975 | Hongsoraaj | "Om Namah Shibay" | Sudhin Dasgupta | | Sandhya Mukherjee, Tarun Banerjee |
| 1975 | Shubho Songbad | "Ami Mori Laaje" | Sudhin Dasgupta | | solo |
| 1975 | Shubho Songbad | "Jetuku Chai" | Sudhin Dasgupta | | solo |
| 1975 | Shubho Songbad | "Tomate Amate" (part 1) | Sudhin Dasgupta | | solo |
| 1975 | Shubho Songbad | "Tomate Amate" (part 2) | Sudhin Dasgupta | | solo |
| 1976 | Anandamela | "Bish Koutoy Bish Chhilona" | Nachiketa Ghosh | | solo |
| 1976 | Shubho Songbad | "Aaj Akash Paare" | Nachiketa Ghosh | | solo |
| 1976 | Shubho Songbad | "Sob Bhalo Jar" | Nachiketa Ghosh | | solo |
| 1976 | Shubho Songbad | "Ja Gechhe Ta Jaak" | Nachiketa Ghosh | | solo |
| 1976 | Shubho Songbad | "Bashite Bahar Chhilo" | Nachiketa Ghosh | | solo |
| 1976 | Sudur Niharika | "Jekhanei Tumi Thako" | Manabendra Mukhopadhyay | Shyamal Gupta | solo |
| 1976 | Sudur Niharika | "Jibon Moroner Sathi" | Manabendra Mukhopadhyay | Shyamal Gupta | Manna Dey |
| 1977 | Baba Taraknath | "Poncho Prodeepe Dhupe" | Neeta Sen | Gauriprasanna Mazumdar | Banasree Sengupta, Dinendra Chowdhury |
| 1977 | Padma Nadir Majhi | "Padma Nadir Majhi" | Dinendra Chowdhury | Manik Bandyopadhyay | Hemanta Mukherjee, Dhananjay Bhattacharya, Anup Ghoshal and others |
| 1977 | Proxy | "Jodi Tomar Chokher Akash" | Hemanta Mukherjee | | Hemanta Mukherjee |
| 1978 | Bansari | "Nhoromer Gaan Shune Phool" | Hriday Kushari | | solo |
| 1978 | Bansari | "Ke Tumi Ami Jaani" | Hriday Kushari | | solo |
| 1978 | Korunamoyi | "Ja Debi Sorbobhuteshu" | Sudhin Dasgupta | | Hemanta Mukherjee |
| 1978 | Nishaan | "Tumi Je Premer" | Shyamal Mitra | Gauriprasanna Mazumdar | Kishore Kumar |
| 1978 | Tilottama | "Amay Tomar Motoi" | | | solo |
| 1979 | Krishna Sudama | "Dao Likhe Dao" | Neeta Sen | | solo |
| 1979 | Krishna Sudama | "Phaguay Ke Kumari" | Neeta Sen | | Usha Mangeshkar, Gautam, chorus |
| 1979 | Nondon | "Churi Churi Churi Amar Mon" | Sudhin Dasgupta | | Sudhin Dasgupta |
| 1979 | Nondon | "Ghore Osustho Bhai" | Sudhin Dasgupta | | solo |
| 1979 | Srikanter Will | "O Amar Joto Sukh" | Salil Chowdhury | | solo |
| 1980 | Premer Phandey | "Kotha Dilam Ei Aam Bagane" | N/A | N/A | Anup Ghoshal |
| 1980 | Putul Ghor | "O Akash" | | | solo |
| 1980 | Rajnondini | "Antor Jaar Athoi Sagor" (female) | Abhijeet Banerjee | | solo |
| 1980 | Sujata | "Jodi Chand Aar Surjo" | Nachiketa Ghosh | | Aarti Mukherjee |
| 1980 | Sujata | "Megher Pore Megh Jome" | Nachiketa Ghosh | | solo |
| 1980 | Upalabdhi | "Projapoti Sethay Ghore" | | | solo |
| 1981 | Chameli Memsaheb | "Asom Desher Meye Ami" | Bhupen Hazarika | Shibdas Banerjee | solo |
| 1981 | Khelar Putul | "Amar Jibon Jodi" | Hemanta Mukherjee | Pulak Banerjee | solo |
| 1982 | Aparupa | "Pelam Kothay" | R. D. Burman | Gauriprasanna Mazumdar | Amit Kumar |
| 1982 | Aparupa | "Laal Neel Holde" | R. D. Burman | Gauriprasanna Mazumdar | chorus |
| 1982 | Protikkha | "Ei Holo Hashi" | Hemanta Mukherjee | N/A | solo |
| 1982 | Protikkha | "Seema Theke Dure" | Hemanta Mukherjee | N/A | Hemanta Mukherjee |
| 1982 | Rajbodhu | "Oi Neel Neel" | Abhijeet Banerjee | | Manna Dey |
| 1982 | Sonar Bangla | "Mukhei Boli Bharotbasi" | Neeta Sen | Gauriprasanna Mazumdar | Manna Dey |
| 1982 | Sonar Bangla | "Keu Jodi Nao Thake" | Neeta Sen | Gauriprasanna Mazumdar | solo |
| 1982 | Sonar Bangla | "Tuturidhun" | Neeta Sen | Gauriprasanna Mazumdar | Hemanta Mukherjee, Haimanti Shukla |
| 1983 | Bonoshree | "E Pathor" | Sudhin Dasgupta | N/A | Manna Dey |
| 1983 | Bonoshree | "Se Kotha Rakhena" | Sudhin Dasgupta | N/A | Manna Dey |
| 1983 | Bonoshree | "Shudhu Ekti Bhalobashar Gaan" | Sudhin Dasgupta | N/A | solo |
| 1983 | Chena Achena | "Koto Swapna Chhilo" | Abhijeet Banerjee | | solo |
| 1983 | Chena Achena | "Jouban Palashe Agun" | Abhijeet Banerjee | | solo |
| 1983 | Parabat Priya | "Naa Re Naa Tumi Naa" | Ajoy Das | Pulak Banerjee | solo |
| 1983 | Roktoraag | "Aasmame Joto Roshni" | Abhijeet Banerjee | | solo |
| 1983 | Tagari | "Ami Gourharir Choron" | N/A | N/A | solo |
| 1983 | Tagari | "Tagari Naamti Amar" | N/A | N/A | solo |
| 1983 | Tagari | "Piriti Rosher Khela" | N/A | N/A | Hemanta Mukherjee |
| 1984 | Rashiphal | "Dhoro Dhoro Shrimatike" | N/A | N/A | Anup Ghoshal |
| 1984 | Rashiphal | "Ki Hobe Na Hobe" | N/A | N/A | Anup Ghoshal |
| 1984 | Rashiphal | "Jokhon Tokhon Asa" | N/A | N/A | solo |
| 1984 | Shilalipi | "Prothom Dekhar Pore" | Suparnakanti Ghosh | Palash Bandyopadhyay | solo |
| 1985 | Shatru | "Bolona Gi Kar Maa Tumi" | R. D. Burman | Gauriprasanna Mazumdar | solo |
| 1987 | Radharani | "Kunjokanon Ghire" | | | solo |
| 1992 | Rongin Bosonto | "Abeshe Bhora Mon" | | | solo |
| 1995 | Tarini Maa Tara | "Tui Maa Tara Korunamoyi" | | | solo |
| 1995 | Tarini Maa Tara | "Bhim Bibhishon" | | | solo |
| 1997 | Banglar Bodhu | "Tomake Bhalo Je Besechhi" | Ahmed Imtiaz Bulbul, Anupam Dutta | | solo |

=== Popular songs ===
- "Shyam Teri Bansi Pukare" (with Jaspal Singh – Geet Gaata Chal)
- "Do Panchhi Do Tinke"
- "Kabhi Kuchch Pal Jeevan Ke"
- "Do Naina, Aur Ek Kahani"
- "Yadon Ko Bhool Jayen To Kaise Bhool Jayen"
- "Nayana Neer Na Bahao"
- "Bolo Na Bolo Na Soi"
- "Prajapati Sethay Ghore"
- "Kon Kule Aaj Bhirlo Tari"
- "Swapna Niye"
- "Sujyi Alo De"
- "Anugatajane Keno Karo Eto"
- "Tokhon Tomar Ekush Bosor"
- "Ei Mon Jochonay Ongo Vijiye"
- "Sara Mora Kajra Churaya Tu Ne" ( with Rafi -Do Dil – 1965)
- "Shile Shile Theka Khale"
- "O Golap O Malati"
