= Aandhar Periye =

1973 Bengali film

Aandhar Periye is a Bengali drama film directed by Tapan Sinha based on the story of Bengali author Chittaranjan Maity. This film was released on 23 March 1973 under the banner of Satasudha Productions.

== Plot ==
This is the story a young woman who has struggled with severe eyesight issues. After her marriage her vision condition deteriorated and she becomes blind. She is in finding her inner strength to fight against limitations of her blindness as well as surrounding conservative society and family.

== Cast ==
- Subhendu Chatterjee
- Bikash Roy
- Madhabi Mukherjee
- Anil Chatterjee
- Chinmoy Roy
- Sumitra Mukherjee
- Nirmal Kumar
- Subrata Chatterjee
- Premangsu Basu
