= Koler Gaan =

2019 Bengali Film

- Bengali: কলের গান
- Directed by: Pranab Mukherjee
- Written by: Pranab Mukherjee
- Produced by: Pritam Singh; Sushil Kumar Sharma
- Starring: Soham Chakraborty; Rittika Sen; Supriyo Dutta
- Music by: Pranab Mukherjee
- Production company: CR Production
- Release date: 4 January 2019
- Country: India
- Language: Bengali

Koler Gaan is a 2019 Bengali film which was directed by Pranab Mukherjee and produced by Pritam Singh, Sushil Kumar Sharma under the banner of CR Production. It starred Paran Bandopadhyay, Chaiti Ghoshal, and Kalyan Chatterjee. The film was released on 4 January 2019.

== Plot ==
Chandrakanta, a 70 years old man, stays with his family, a son, Chandan, daughter in law Sumitra and grandson Chanchal. Chandrakanta used to listen gramophone since childhood. The Gramophone was gifted to his late father, Chunnilal Mukherjee by the European director Martin Burn and company when he was leaving for England.

== Cast ==
- Paran Bandopadhayay
- Chaiti Ray Ghoshal
- Kalyan Chatterjee
- Bhaskar Banerjee
