= Bishabriksha (1984 film) =

- Directed by: Ajoy Kar
- Screenplay by: Salil Sen
- Based on: Bishabrikshaby Bankim Chandra Chattopadhyay
- Produced by: Ajit Kumar Roy
- Starring: Ranjit Mallick; Aparna Sen; Debashree Roy; Lily Chakravarty; Swarup Dutta
- Edited by: Dulal Dutta
- Music by: Hemanta Mukhopadhyay
- Release date: 13 April 1984
- Country: India
- Language: Bengali

Bishabriksha (The Poison Tree) is a Bengali drama film directed by Ajoy Kar and produced by Ajit Kumar Roy based on Bankim Chandra Chattopadhyay's 1873 novel Bishabriksha. The film was released on 13 April 1984 under the banner of Arindam Pictures. This is the last film directed by Ajoy Kar.

== Plot ==
Nagendranath is a wealthy zamindar, happily married to his devoted wife Suryamukhi. His life changes when he meets a young orphan Kundanandini. He emotionaly involves with Kundanandini which leads to jealousy and family misunderstandings. Finally Suryamukhi leaves the house. Realising his loss Nagendranath goes away to search for his wife.

== Cast ==
- Ranjit Mallick as Nagendranath
- Aparna Sen as Suryamukhi
- Debashree Roy as Kundanandini
- Lily Chakravarty as Kamalmoni
- Subrata Chatterjee as Heera
- Kaushik Banerjee as Debendra
- Swarup Dutta
- Kalyan Chatterjee
- Kanika Bhattacharya
- Dilip Bose
- Gita Karmakar
- Shailen Mukherjee
