= Nirmal Kumar =

Indian actor (born 1928)

- Nirmal Kumar in Atanka (1986)
- Born: 14 December 1928 (age 97); Bhowanipore, Kolkata, India
- Citizenship: Indian
- Occupation: Actor
- Years active: 1949–2009
- Known for: Shesher Kabita (1953); Godhuli (1955); Kalindi (1955); Kshaniker Atithi (1959); Kono Ekdin (1960); Kamallata (1969)
- Spouse: Madhabi Mukherjee (m. 1968)
- Children: 2
- Father: Indushekhar Chakraborty
- Awards: BFJA Award

Nirmal Kumar (Bengali: নির্মল কুমার; born 14 December 1928, in Kolkata, India) is an Indian actor who is known for his work in Bengali cinema, radio and theatre. Often regarded as one of the greatest voice-over artists during 1960s and 1970s, Kumar lent his voice to numerous Bengali radio dramas. Winner of a BFJA Award, he made his big screen debut as Amit Roy in Madhu Bose's Bengali drama film Shesher Kabita (1953) based on Rabindranath Tagore's novel of the same name. He rose to wider fame for his role as Srikanta in the Bengali radio drama Srikanta. He is also known for his roles in Bengali films such as Drishti (1955), Godhuli (1955), Kalindi (1955), Paresh (1955), Chalachal (1956), Kirtigarh (1960), Louhakapat (1958), Bhranti (1959), Janmantar (1959), Thakur Haridas (1959), Kshaniker Atithi (1959), Kono Ekdin (1960), Sandhyarag (1961), Lal Pathar (1964) and Kamallata (1969).

Nirmal Kumar collaborated with Kartik Chattopadhyay in his drama film Godhuli (1955) based on Narendranath Mitra's novel of the same name. His collaboration with Tapan Sinha includes Upahar (1955), Louhakapat (1958), Kshaniker Atithi (1959), Apanjan (1968), Ekhoni (1971), Aandhar Periye (1973), Raja (1975), Sabuj Dwiper Raja (1979), Banchharamer Bagan (1980), Adalat o Ekti Meye (1982), Baidurya Rahasya (1985), Atanka (1986), Antardhan (1992) and Ajab Gayer Ajab Katha (1998). He also teamed up with eminent Indian filmmakers such as Ajoy Kar in Paresh (1955), Partha Pratim Chowdhury in Chayasurya (1963) and Dolna (1965), Chidananda Dasgupta in Bilet Ferat (1972), Arundhati Devi in Padi Pishir Barmi Baksha (1972), Bijoy Bose in Subarnalata (1981) and Samapti (1983), Tarun Majumdar in Pathbhola (1986) and Apan Amar Apan (1990), Rituparno Ghosh in Dahan (1998), and Kaushik Ganguly in Waarish (2004). He was also a part of Madhabi Mukherjee's directorial venture Atmaja (1998). He featured opposite Sumitra Devi in Gobinda Ray's Thakur Haridas (1959) and Suchitra Sen in Harisadhan Dasgupta's Kamallata (1969).

== Career ==
In 1949, Nirmal Kumar was an LDC at Calcutta High Court when he joined Gananatya on Sabitabrata Dutta's insistence. Several days later, he became a part of Bohurupee, which offered him the golden opportunity to observe Sombhu Mitra's acting style and voice modulation. Rabi Basu in his Satrang stated that Kumar excelled in all his radio dramas as he learned a substantial part of voice modulation from Mitra. The plays Kumar collaborated with Bohurupee were Pathik and Chera Tar, both penned by Tulsi Lahiri. Pathik was based on Rober Emmet Sherwood's The Petrified Forest. He, alongside Sabitabrata Dutta and Santosh Dutta formed a theatre group named Anandam.

In 1952, Sabitabrata Dutta (Note: Sabitabrata Dutta had also auditioned for Amit Ray, but he was considered unsuitable for the role.) advised Kumar to audition for Amit Ray in Madhu Bose's directorial venture Shesher Kabita (1953), based on Tagore's Shesher Kabita (1929). Kumar successfully auditioned for this role in Calcutta Movietone Studio. He was cast alongside Dipti Roy portraying the role of Labanya. The screenplay of the film was written by Nripendra Krishna Chatteejee. Though the film was a moderate success at the box office, it catapulted Kumar to stardom.

Imagine my guts when I instantly said yes the moment he asked if I can play Amit Ray. “What’s there not to play Amit Ray? Of course, I can,” I said. Madhu Bose was stumped by my confidence and told Jhonu (Note: Sabitabrata Dutta) that on every earlier occasion, anyone who was given this offer had said he needed time to think over the proposal. And here was someone who was ready instantly. He then asked if I was ready to read any book he gave me. He handed over an excerpt from Rabindra Rachanabali and asked me to read it aloud.

— Nirmal Kumar on how he secured his role as Amit Ray

Following the success of Shesher Kabita, Kumar appeared in a string of Bengali films including Sushil Majumdar's Bhangagara (1954), Bikash Roy's Ardhangini (1955), Chitta Basu's Drishti (1955), Kartik Chattopadhyaay's Godhuli (1955), Naresh Mitra's Kalindi (1955), Ajoy Kar's Paresh (1955) and Tapan Sinha's Upahar (1955). Nirmal starred opposite Kaberi Bose in Chitta Basu's Drishti (1955) was a moderate success. Nirmal collaborated with Pahari Sanyal in Ajoy Kar's Paresh (1955) based on the short story of the same name by Sarat Chandra Chatterjee. Nirmal played the titular role who is torn between Gurucharan, his conscientious uncle enacted by Pahari Sanyal and Haricharan, his avaricious father who proposes an unfair allotment of their ancestral property. The screenplay of the film was written by Jotirmoy Roy while some of extra dialogues were penned by Sajanikanta Das. He starred alongside Jahar Ganguly, Arundhati Devi and Sabitri Chatterjee in Kartik Chattopadhyay's drama film Godhuli (1955) based on Narendranath Mitra's novel of the same name. Nirmal played Chinmoy who falls in love with his cousin's wife Indulekha portrayed by Arundhati, and implores her to marry him. The depiction of the extra-marital affair led to controversy. The film was a box office failure. Nirmal's another collaboration with Arundhati Devi is Dujanay (1955) that stars Basanta Chowdhury and Sabita Chatterjee in the lead.

Nirmal collaborated with Kaberi Bose in Madhu Bose's Paradhin (1956) which was a box office failure. He starred alongside Arundhati Devi in Asit Sen's Chalachal (1956).

He collaborated with Arundhati Devi in Asim Banerjee's Janmantar (1959).

Impressed with the massive box office success of Nilachaley Mahaprabhu (1957) depicting Gaudiya Vaishnavism movement, Gobinda Ray decided to portray Haridas Thakur's life and devotional achievement in the biographical drama Thakur Haridas (1959). Nirmal Kumar was approached to portray Haridas Thakur alongside Sumitra Devi portraying the role of Lakshaheera who is sent by the landlord Ramchandra Khan to seduce the mendicant Haridas. Haridas appears to be generous and free of amorous desire. Impressed with Haridas' dissociation with worldly desire, Lakshaheera falls in love with him and becomes his devotee. The screenplay of the film was written by Bipradas Thakur. The film delineates the platonic love between Haridas and Lakshaheera. Asim Kumar who enacted Chaitanya Mahaprabhu in Nilachaley Mahaprabhu (1957) was proposed to reprise his role in the film, but he refused as he did not want the film to be as iconic as Nilachaley Mahaprabhu (1957). Malay Kumar was then signed to portray Mahaprabhu. The marketing of the film being heavily propelled on Sumitra Devi's stardom, it became a financial success. Nirmal Kumar received positive review.

After Uttam Kumar refused to play the male lead in Jibon Ganguli's film Sandhyarag (1961) based on Rabindranath Tagore's Bengali short story Kankal, Nirmal was approached to portray the lead. He plays the role of a young doctor who, in the dead of night, listens to a skeleton that returns as a phantom voice to recount a tragic story of her life. The screenplay of the film was penned by the director himself while the music was composed by Ravi Shankar. The film was selected for several international film festivals including Cairo International Film Festival.

He starred as Gahar Gosai opposite Suchitra Sen playing the titular role in Harisadhan Dasgupta's Kamallata (1969) based on Sarat Chandra Chattopadhyay's celebrated novel Srikanta.

Nirmal Kumar also starred opposite Sabitri Chatterjee in Paresh (1955), Upahar (1955) and Sansar (1971), Supriya Devi in Kono Ekdin (1960), Bishkanya (1961), Abhisarika (1962), Dui Nari (1963) and Harano Prem (1966), Basabi Nandi in Bhranti (1959), Tanuja in Dolna (1965), Sumita Sanyal in Apanjan (1968), Sohag Sen in Bilet Ferat (1972) and Madhabi Mukherjee in Bindur Chhele (1973), Bon Palashir Padabali (1973) and Subarnalata (1981).

In Rituparno Ghosh's National Award-winning Bengali film Dahan (1998), Nirmal Kumar portrayed an authoritarian lawyer who secures the acquittal of a gang of molesters, arguing that Srabana, the woman who persuaded the victim to lodge an FIR against them, is a promiscuous woman and therefore an unreliable witness.

== Accolades ==
Year	Title	Category	Work	Result	Ref.
1970	BFJA Award	Best Supporting Actor	Kamallata	Won	

== Filmography ==
Year	Title	Role	Note	Ref.
1953	Shesher Kabita	Amit Ray		
1954	Bhangagara			
1955	Ardhangini			
1955	Drishti	Kalyan		
1955	Dujanay	Alok		
1955	Godhuli	Chinmay		
1955	Kalindi	Ahindra Chakraborty		
1955	Paresh	Paresh		
1955	Upahar			
1956	Bhaduri Mashai			
1956	Chalachal			
1956	Kirtigarh			
1956	Manraksha			
1956	Paradhin			
1956	Shubholagna			
1958	Louhakapat	Malay		
1958	Shikar			
1959	Agni sambhaba			
1959	Bhranti	Asit		
1959	Janmantar	Ashish		
1959	Kshaniker Atithi			
1959	Thakur Haridas	Haridas Thakur	Shared screen with Sumitra Devi	
1960	Kono Ekdin			
1961	Bishkanya			
1961	Sandhyarag	Manas		
1962	Abhisarika			
1962	Agun			
1963	Chhayasurya			
1963	Dui Nari	Nikhilesh		
1964	Lal Pathar			
1965	Dolna	Siddhartha		
1966	Harano Prem	Tarun		
1966	Mayabini Lane			
1968	Apanjan			
1969	Kamallata	Gahar Goshai	Shared screen with Suchitra Sen	
1970	Bilambito Loy			
1971	Ekhoni			
1971	Sansar	Satyen		
1972	Padi Pisir Barmi Baksa			
1973	Aandhar Periye			
1973	Banpalashir Padabali			
1973	Bilet Pherat			
1973	Bindur Chhele	Madhab		
1973	Duranta Joy			
1973	Sonar Khancha			
1975	Raja			
1977	Chhotto Nayak			
1977	Nayan			
1977	Phulshajya			
1977	Ramer Sumati			
1978	Nishkriti			
1979	Sabuj Dwiper Raja			
1980	Banchharamer Bagan			
1980	Darpachurna			
1980	Gopal Bhanrh			
1981	Subarnalata			
1982	Adalat o Ekti Meye			
1983	Samapti			
1985	Antarale			
1985	Baidurya Rahasya			
1985	Til Theke Tal			
1986	Amar bandhan			
1986	Atanka			
1986	Jiban Sathi			
1986	Kenaram Becharam			
1986	Pathbhola			
1987	Arpan			
1988	Tumi Koto Sundar			
1988	Surer Sathi			
1989	Aghatan Ajo Ghate			
1989	Aparanher Alo			
1989	Aakrosh			
1989	Angar			
1989	Asha-o-Bhalobasha			
1989	Balidan			
1989	Mone Mone			
1989	Mandanda			
1990	Apan Amar Apan			
1990	Byabadhan			
1991	Bourani			
1991	Prem Pujari			
1991	Rajnartaki			
1991	Sadharan Meye			
1992	Antardhan			
1992	Anutap			
1992	Krodhi			
1992	Mani Kanchan			
1992	Nabarupa			
1993	Kanyadan			
1993	Mayer Ashirbad			
1993	Prithibir Shesh Station			
1993	Srimati			
1994	Atikram			
1994	Bidrohini			
1994	Kalpurush			
1994	Raktanadir Dhara			
1995	Pratidhwani			
1995	Rangin Basanta			
1996	Biyer Phool			
1996	Lathi			
1996	Sinthir Sindoor			
1996	Tarini Tarama			
1997	Dabidar			
1997	Nirjan Dwip			
1997	Pratirodh			
1997	Jiban Sandhan			
1997	Sriman Bhootnath			
1998	Ajab Gayer Ajab Katha			
1998	Atmaja			
1998	Dahan			
1998	Sagar Banya			
1999	Khelaghar			
1999	Dadabhai			
1999	Dabidar			
1999	Shasti Holo			
2000	Kalankini Badhu			
2001	Pratibad			
2002	Bar-Kane			
2003	Rakta Bandhan			
2004	Annaye Atyachar			
2004	Iti Srikanta			
2006	Faltu			
2008	Ek Nadir Galpo: Tale of a River			
2009	Jekhane Ashroy		Delayed release	

== Radio dramas ==
Year	Title	Role	Note	Ref.
	Srikanta	Srikanta		
1972	Kanchenjunga			
1974	Nishijapan			
	Kshudhita Pashan			
	Mahaprasthaner Pathe			
1995	Jogajog			

== Bibliography ==
- Rabi Basu (29 April 2000). Satrang (in Bengali). Vol. 2. Deep Prakashan.
- Sivaprasad Samaddar (1983). Saradah śatam (in Bengali). Anima Prakasani.
