= Upahar =

1955 Indian Bengali film

- Upahar
- Directed by: Tapan Sinha
- Written by: Sailajananda Mukhopadhyay; Dialogues - Sudhiranjan Mukhopadhyay
- Screenplay by: Tapan Sinha
- Based on: Krishna; 1955 Story by Sailajananda Mukhopadhyay
- Starring: Uttam Kumar; Manju Dey; Sabitri Chatterjee
- Cinematography: Anil Banerjee
- Edited by: Subodh Ray
- Music by: Kalipada Sen; Lyricist - Gauriprasanna Majumdar
- Production company: Bani Chitram
- Distributed by: Chayabani Limited
- Release date: 12 August 1955
- Running time: 127 minutes
- Country: India
- Language: Bengali

Upahar is a Bengali drama film directed by Tapan Sinha based on a novel Krishna of Sailajananda Mukherjee. This film was produced by the Bani Chitram and release in 1955. It's starring Uttam Kumar, Manju Dey and Sabitri Chatterjee in lead. Music director of the film was Kalipada Sen. This was the second film and first collaboration for Sinha with Kumar. The film was critically acclaimed but was moderately successful at the box office.

== Cast ==
- Uttam Kumar as Professor Ashok Sarkar
- Sabitri Chatterjee as Krishna
- Manju Dey as Neela
- Nirmal Kumar Chattopadhyay as Sunil
- Chabi Biswas as Sunil's father
- Kanu Banerjee as Kangalibabu
- Aparna Devi as Sunil's mother
- Tulsi Chakraborty as Ghatak
- Anubha Gupta as Sunil's aunt
- Jahar Roy as Servant
- Shyam Laha as Sethji

== Soundtrack ==
Upahar

Soundtrack album by Kalipada Sen
- Released: 1955
- Recorded: 1955
- Studio: Bani Chitram
- Length: 0:05:58
- Label: Angel Digital

Kalipada Sen chronology
Bidhilipi (1955)	Upahar (1955)	Kankabatir Ghat (1955)

All lyrics are written by Gauriprasanna Majumdar; all music is composed by Kalipada Sen.

Songs
No.	Title	Playback	Length
1.	"Rimjhim Rimjhim"	Suprova Mitra	3:30
2.	"Din Chale Jay"	Shyamal Mitra	2:28
Total length:			5:58

== Reception ==
This was only the second Bengali film from director Tapan Sinha. His first film Ankush did not perform well. This was also the first collaboration by Uttam and Sinha. This film performed average at that time, but Uttam's performance was considered as one of the finest and ahead of the time. Sinha wrote in his autobiography that "Uttam's future is promising. There is lot of potential hidden in him." This film was a milestone.
