= Postmaster (disambiguation) =

A postmaster is the head of an individual post office.

Postmaster may also refer to:

- Postmaster (computing), the administrator of an email server
- Postmaster, a senior undergraduate scholar of Merton College, Oxford (Latin portionista; as opposed to a junior undergraduate scholar, known as an Exhibitioner)
- Operation Postmaster, a British WW2 clandestine military action
- Der Postmeister, or The Postmaster, 1940 German film
- Postmaster (film), a 2016 Bengali film
- Master of a post house (historical building), supplying post horses

== See also ==
- Postmaster General (disambiguation)
