= Mrinal Mukherjee =

Indian actor, theatre personality, music director (1944 or 1945 – 2019)

- Mrinal Mukherjee in 1970s
- Born: 1944 or 1945; Jamshedpur, Jharkhand, India
- Died: 7 May 2019 (aged 74); Kolkata, West Bengal, India
- Occupations: Actor; theatre personality; music director
- Spouses: Shibani; Basabdutta
- Children: 3 (including Jojo and Debopriyo Mukherjee)

Mrinal Mukherjee (1944 or 1945 – 7 May 2019) was an Indian actor and singer. As an actor he is known for his work in Bengali cinema, television and stage. He made his debut in Shankhabela (1966) starring Uttam Kumar. He rose to prominence for his role as Amal in the National Award winning Bengali film Chhuti (1967) directed by Arundhati Devi and further cemented his foothold in Bengali cinema with his roles in Apanjan (1968), Ekhoni (1971) and Padi Pisir Barmi Baksho (1972).

== Career ==
Mrinal Mukherjee made his debut in Shankhabela (1966) starring Basant Chowdhury, Uttam Kumar and Madhabi Mukherjee. After that, he performed in a number of commercial movies across more than five decades in Bengali film industry and played crucial roles. He acted with notable directors in number of movies like Galpo Holeo Satti, Nayika Sangbad, Chuti, Shriman Prithviraj etc. He also performed as music director as well as playback singer in Bengali films and worked with Gulzar in the film Mausam. Mukherjee was suffering from liver cancer and died in Kolkata on 7 May 2019.

== Filmography ==
Year	Title	Role	Ref.
1966	Shankhabela		
1967	Chhuti	Amal	
1967	Nayika Sangbad		
1968	Apanjan		
1969	Aandhar Surya		
1969	Chiradiner		
1969	Mon Niye		
1970	Aleyar Alo		
1970	Bilombito Loy		
1971	Ekhoni		
1971	Sansar		
1973	Shriman Prithviraj		
2003	Mayer Anchal		
2004	Badsha the King		
2006	Ekai Eksho		
	Paribar		
	Surya		
	Eri Naam Prem		
	Sangharsha		
	Tulkalam		
	Yoddha: The Warrior		
	Aaghat		
	Barood		
	Nayak		
	Khalnayak		
	Ek Tukro Chand		
	Surya Sakkhi		
	Golmaal		
	Byomkesh O Chiriyakhana		
2002	Sonar Sansar		
	Apan Por		
	Aandha Prem		
	Khana Baraha		
	Dadu No. 1		
