= Aporajeyo =

- Bengali: অপরাজেয়
- Directed by: Nehal Dutta
- Release date: 9 June 2023
- Country: India
- Language: Bengali

Aporajeyo is a 2023 Indian Bengali-language film directed by Nehal Dutta. The film stars Ranjit Mallick, Sabitri Chatterjee, and Laboni Sarkar. In this film Ranjit Mallick returned to the big screen by playing the character of Subhankar Sanyal.

== Cast ==
- Ranjit Mallick
- Sabitri Chatterjee
- Laboni Sarkar
- Sumit Ganguly
- Mrinal Mukherjee

== Release ==
It was released on 9 June 2023.
