= Nayantara (film) =

- Directed by: Raja Mitra
- Story by: Bimal Kar
- Produced by: Government of West Bengal
- Starring: Mamata Shankar; Saswata Chatterjee; Sabitri Chatterjee; Rabi Ghosh
- Cinematography: Dhrubajyoti Bose
- Edited by: Ujjal Nandy
- Music by: Raja Mitra
- Production company: National Film Development Corporation of India
- Release date: 1 July 1997
- Running time: 108 minutes
- Country: India
- Language: Bengali

Nayantara is a 1997 Bengali drama film directed by Raja Mitra and produced by the Government of West Bengal, based on a story of Bengali novelist Bimal Kar. It was released under the banner of National Film Development Corporation (NFDC).

== Plot ==
The film follows the life of a renowned theatre actress named Nayantara, who marries an artist named Manik, who is addicted to gambling and heavy drinking. His death leaves Nayantara as the sole financial provider for their introverted son, Kumar. It captures their financial hardship and her fractured communication with Kumar as she faces her battle with terminal cancer.

== Cast ==
- Mamata Shankar as Nayantara
- Saswata Chatterjee
- Sabitri Chatterjee
- Rabi Ghosh
- Swarup Dutta
- Laboni Sarkar
- Subhayu Ghosh
- Pijushkanti Sarkar
