= Upaharam =

Upaharam (lit. 'gift' in Indian languages) may refer to:

- Upaharam (1972 film), an Indian Malayalam-language film directed by S Roy
- Upaharam (1985 film), an Indian Malayalam-language film directed by Sajan

== See also ==
- Uphaar, a 1971 Indian Hindi-language film
- Uphaar Cinema fire, a major 1997 cinema fire in Delhi, India
