= Shyamal Ghoshal =

Indian actor (1942–2014)

Shyamal Ghosal
- Born: 1942
- Died: 2014 (aged 71–72)
- Occupation: Actor
- Children: Chaiti Ghoshal

Shyamal Ghoshal was an Indian film and television actor. He was recognized for his work in Bengali cinema.

== Career ==
He had worked under the direction of Satyajit Ray, Ritwik Ghatak, Manju Dey, Tarun Majumdar, etc. During his heyday, he was paired with Madhabi Mukherjee and Sailen Mukherjee.

== Personal life ==
He is the father of actress Chaiti Ghoshal.

== Filmography ==
- Headmaster, 1959
- Subarnarekha (film) 1962
- Kanna, 1962
- Mahanagar, 1963
- Charulata, 1964 As Umapada
- Trisna, 1965
- Chiriakhana, 1967
- Kuheli 1971
- Shajarur Kanta (1974 film) As Byomkesh Boxi lead role
- Jukti Takko Aar Gappo , 1974
- Srikanter Will, 1979
- Paar, 1984
- Kahini, 1995
- Joto kando Katmandute, 1996
- Sesh Parba
- Nirjan Sanlap
- Bilambita Loy , 1970
- Jay Maa Tara
- Sonar Payra
- Rater Rajanigandha
