= Mahabiplabi Aurobindo =

- মহাবিপ্লবী অরবিন্দ
- Directed by: Dipak Gupta
- Screenplay by: Dipak Gupta
- Starring: Ajitesh Bandopadhyay; Shekhar Chatterjee; Subrata Chatterjee; Tarun Kumar Chatterjee; Padma Devi; Dilip Roy
- Music by: Hemant Kumar
- Distributed by: Kamala Films
- Release date: 1971
- Country: India
- Language: Bengali

Mahabiplabi Aurobindo (Great Revolutionary Aurobindo) is a Bengali biographical drama film directed by Dipak Gupta based on the life of Indian nationalist leader and philosopher Sri Aurobindo. The film was released in 1971 under the Banner of Kamala Films.

== Plot ==
The film revolves with the early life and later political activism of Arabinda Ghosh. As a brilliant student, Ghosh completed his education from England joined Baroda estate. Following his return to Bengal he becomes a key organizer in the Indian freedom struggle. The film englitshHis involvement in the secret revolutionary society Anushilan Samiti, and his subsequent arrest during the historic Alipore Bomb Case trial defended by Chittaranjan Das.

== Cast ==
- Ajitesh Bandopadhyay
- Shekhar Chatterjee
- Subrata Chatterjee
- Tarun Kumar Chatterjee
- Padma Devi
- Dilip Roy
- Bhanu Banerjee
- Gita Dey
- Ananda Mukherjee
- Robin Banerjee
- Nirmal Ghosh
