= Raja Mitra =

Indian film director (1945–2024)

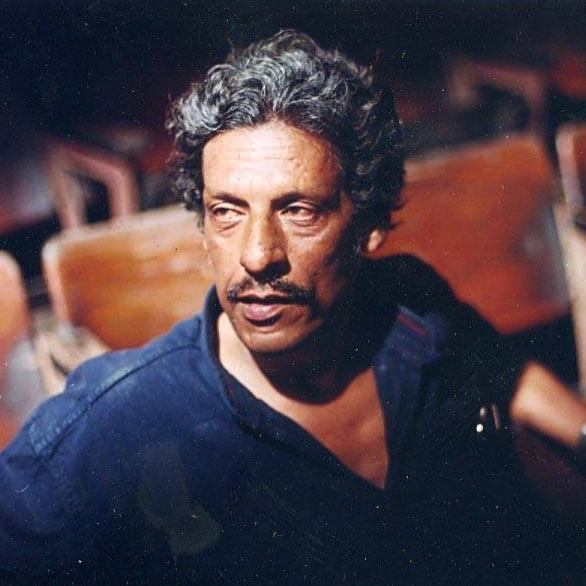
- Born: 17 January 1945; Calcutta, Bengal Province, British India
- Died: 20 December 2024 (aged 79); Kolkata, West Bengal, India
- Occupations: Film director, music director
- Years active: 1978–2024
- Notable work: Ekti Jiban, Jataner Jami, Behula, Scroll Painters of Birbhum
- Children: Roudra Mitra
- Awards: Indira Gandhi Award for Best Debut Film of a Director, National Film Award for Best Short Fiction Film, Bengal Film Journalists' Association Award

Raja Mitra (17 January 1945 – 20 December 2024) was an Indian film director and music director who mainly worked in Bengali cinema. His first feature film, Ekti Jiban, won the National Award for Best Debut Film of a Director in 1987 at the 35th National Awards. He received a Swarna Kamal (Golden Lotus) for "a very courageous first attempt of a director in tackling the subject of an individual unwavering in his conviction in the cultural value of his language and singlehandedly making available its enriching value to the generation of his people who will come after him".

== Early life and education ==
Raja Mitra was born in Calcutta. He graduated from the University of Calcutta in 1967. Mitra was associated with several literary and film journals. He assisted Goutam Ghose in the period of 1978-80.

== Career ==
Beginning his career as a documentary and short filmmaker in 1978, Raja Mitra switched to feature films with Ekti Jiban which in 1988 won him the Indira Gandhi National Award for the Best Film of a Director. It also won him the P.C. Barua award. He directed 32 documentary films, including Coal for the Masses, Economy of HS Oil in Railways, Calcutta Footpath Dweller, The Tribal Resistance, Calcutta, Past and Present, Scroll Painters of Birbhum, Towards a Global Breakthrough, Jiban Patua, Ashray, Vidyasagar, Beyond a Head Count, Kalighat Paintings and Drawings, Mural Paintings of Orissa, Nachni, Ananda Yatra, Mobile Motif - A Journey from Regional to National, and The Enchanted Desk.

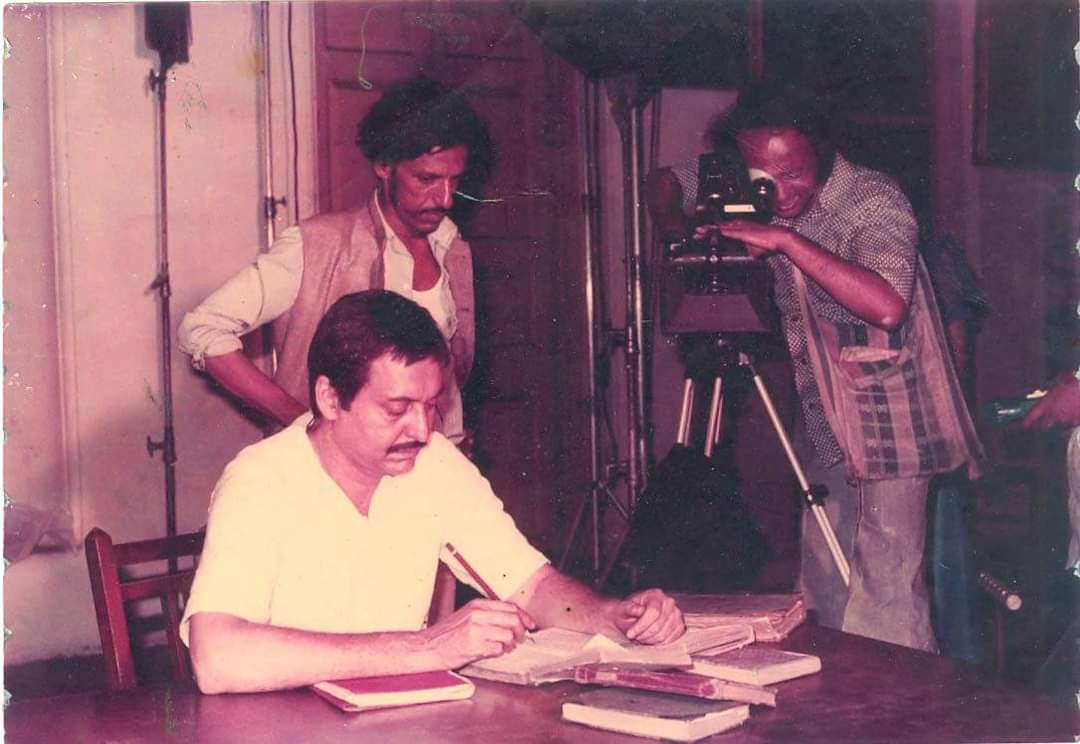
Mitra directing Soumitra Chattopadhyay, from the sets of Ekti Jiban (1987)

In 1989, his Painters of Birbhum was in the Indian Panorama and Italy's Popoli Festival. In 1991, it was in the Short Film Festival of Bangladesh, Kolkata's International Short Film Festival in 1992 and Mumbai's International Short Film Festival in 1998. His Jataner Jami was featured in the Indian Panorama in 1999. It was also there at the Calcutta International Film Festival of 1998. His Behula won the Best Short Fiction Film at the 37th National Awards among the best of Indian cinema in 1989. This also won the Bengal Film Journalists' Association award for Best Fiction Film in 1990.

== Death ==
Raja Mitra died from cancer on 20 December 2024, at the age of 79.

== Filmography ==
- Coal for The Masses (1978)
- Economy of HS Oil in Railways (1980)
- Calcutta Footpath Dweller (1981)
- The Tribal Resistance (1987)
- Calcutta, Past and Present (1987)
- Ekti Jiban (1988)
- Scroll Painters of Birbhum (1989)
- Towards a Global Breakthrough (1991)
- Jiban Patua (1993)
- Ashray (1993)
- Vidyasagar (1993)
- Nayantara (1995)
- Jataner Jami (1997)
- Beyond a Head Count
- Kalighat Paintings and Drawings (2002)
- Mural Paintings of Orissa (2003)
- Nachni (Dancing Girls of Rural Bengal) (2005)
- Drishti Pradip (2007)
- Ananda Yatra (2008)
- The Enchanted Desk (2008)
- Mobile Motif (2009)
- An Author Speaks (2012)

== Awards and recognitions ==
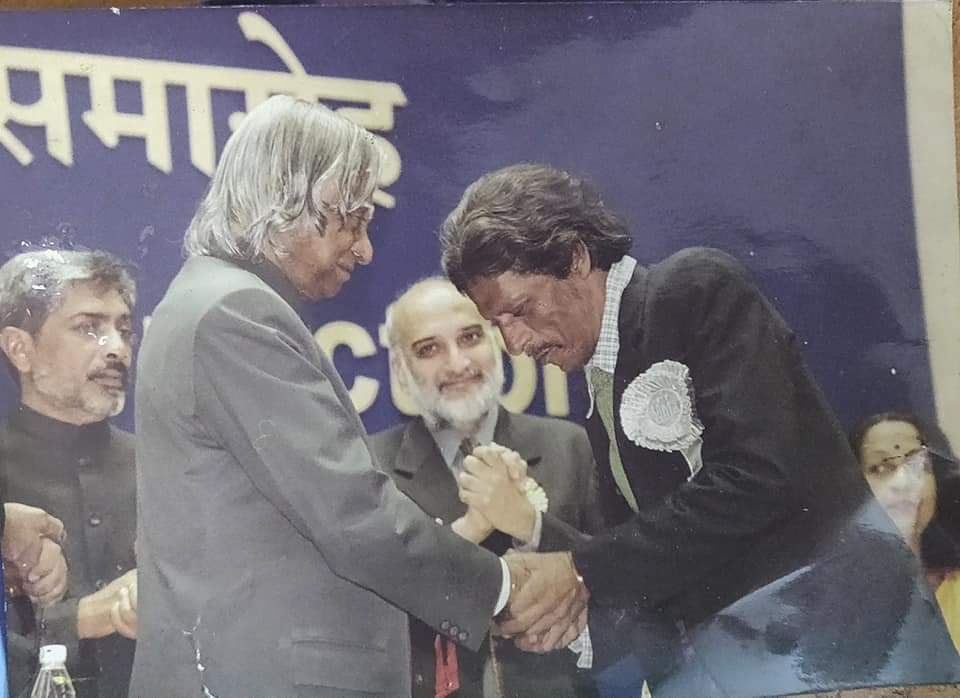
Raja Mitra with President A. P. J. Abdul Kalam, receiving National Award for Best Music Direction

Raja Mitra's Scroll Painters of Birbhum won the Best Arts/Cultural Film at the 36th National Awards in 1989 and was featured in the Indian Panorama apart from being screened in several International Film Festivals. Behula in the following year won the Best Short Fiction Award and was invited to Cannes. His second feature, Nayantara, was in the Indian Panorama for 1996. Mitra's Jataner Jami was adjudged the Best Non-Feature Film at the 45th National Awards for the best of Indian cinema in 1997. Raja won a Golden Lotus (Swarna Kamal). Raja received a Silver Lotus (Rajat Kamal) for Best Music direction for Kalighat Paintings and Drawings at the 50th National Awards.

Mitra served as a member of the jury in the International Film Festival of India in 1989, the National Film Festival in 1992, and the selection panel for the Indian Panorama in 1990 and many a time. He has also been recognized by the Encyclopedia Britannica as an acclaimed filmmaker.
