= Postmaster (short story) =

Bengali short story by Rabindranath Tagore

Postmaster (Bengali: পোস্টমাস্টার) is a Bengali short story by Rabindranath Tagore that explores themes of loneliness, human connection, and the contrasts between urban and rural life. It was written in 1891.

== Summary ==
The story is set in a small village named Ulapur, where a young postmaster from Calcutta has been transferred. The postmaster finds it difficult to adjust to the slow pace and the rural lifestyle. He feels isolated and spends his days in the post office, writing poetry and recalling about his family and friends in the city.

The only person the postmaster interacts with is Ratan, an orphaned village girl who does small chores for him in exchange for food. Ratan becomes emotionally attached to the postmaster, seeing him as a father figure. She takes care of him when he falls ill, and they develop a bond over time. The postmaster teaches Ratan to read and write, and she dreams of a better future with his help. Despite their growing closeness, the postmaster remains detached, longing to return to the city. Eventually, he decides to leave Ulapur and requests a transfer. Ratan is heartbroken and begs him to take her with him, but the postmaster dismisses her plea, believing it to be impractical. As the postmaster leaves the village, he feels a twinge of guilt but quickly rationalizes his decision, convincing himself that Ratan will forget him in time. Meanwhile, Ratan is left devastated, clinging to the hope that the postmaster will return. The story ends on a poignant note, highlighting the transient nature of human relationships and the pain of unfulfilled expectations. Through the simple yet powerful narrative, Tagore captures the emotional complexities of loneliness and the human longing for connection.

== Films based on 'Postmaster' ==
- The Postmaster (a part of Teen Kanya), directed by Satyajit Ray (1961)
- Postmaster, directed by Srijon Bardhan (2016)
