= Apanjan =

1968 Bengali political drama film by Tapan Sinha

- Directed by: Tapan Sinha
- Produced by: R. K. Kapoor
- Starring: Chhaya Devi; Swaroop Dutta; Samit Bhanja
- Cinematography: Bimal Mukherjee
- Edited by: Subodh Roy
- Music by: Tapan Sinha
- Release date: 1968
- Running time: 135 minutes
- Country: India
- Language: Bengali

Apanjan, or simply Aponjon (English: One's own people) is a 1968 Indian Bengali language socio-political action drama film directed by Tapan Sinha. The film is produced by R.K Kapoor under the banner of K.L Kapoor Productions and is based on a short story written by Indra Mittra, which itself was inspired from the political violence taking place in West Bengal. It consists of an ensemble cast of Chhaya Devi, Swarup Dutta, Samit Bhanja, Mrinal Mukherjee, Partho Mukherjee, Kalyan Chatterjee and Shyamal Banerjee in lead roles, with Bhanu Bandopadhyay, Rabi Ghosh, Chinmoy Roy and Dilip Roy in extended cameo appearances. The soundtrack of the film is composed by Tapan Sinha himself. Set against the backdrop of the political violence that rocked India, and West Bengal in particular, in the late 1960s, it tells the story of an aged widow in a village who goes to Calcutta to stay with relatives, but faces only exploitation. She moves to a slum, and finds her "own people" in a group of educated, unemployed youth, who are caught up inexorably in the prevalent violence.

Apanjan was a blockbuster at the box office and successfully ran for 45 weeks in theatres. After its release, the Government of West Bengal declared the film tax-free, and it eventually gained cult status in the history of Bengali cinema. The mannerism of Robi and Chheno, two central characters from the film played by Swarup Dutta and Samit Bhanja respectively, became memorable among the masses. Later it won the National Film Award for Best Feature Film in Bengali, as well as several BFJA Awards. The original print of the film has been restored and digitised by the National Film Archive of India.

In 1971, it was remade in Hindi as Mere Apne by Gulzar and in 1984, in Kannada as Benki Birugali.

== Plot ==
Anandamoyee is a childless widow in a Bengal village. One day a man turns up, claiming to be her nephew. He takes her to live with him and his family in Calcutta. In the city, she experiences something akin to culture shock, as she encounters children begging on the streets and day-to-day violence. She finds the idea of women working at office jobs very strange, and even wearing any kind of footwear is new for her. The couple with whom she lives want her to look after their child, which she does gladly since they are her "own people". However, eventually she realises that she is being exploited as an unpaid nanny. She moves out to a downbeat area of the city, to look after two street children. They are part of the 'family' of Robi, the leader of a gang of educated young men who are active participants in the street violence that engulfs the city. With these outsiders, Anandamoyee feels a sort of kinship, and even a sense of being in a family, which she never enjoyed with her actor husband. Robi's gang is always at daggers drawn with a rival gang led by Chheno. The two gangs are enlisted by cynical politicians, to serve their own ends. The gang war continues, albeit with an ostensibly political colour, reaching a melodramatic climax, with a tragic resolution.

== Cast ==
- Chhaya Devi as Anandamoyee
  - Romi Chowdhury as Young Anandamoyee
- Swarup Dutta as Robi
- Mrinal Mukherjee as Jhonte
- Partho Mukherjee
- Kalyan Chatterjee as Santu
- Samit Bhanja as Chheno
- Shyamal Banerjee
- Nirmal Kumar as Montu
- Sumita Sanyal as Latu, Montu's wife
- Rabi Ghosh
- Bhanu Bandopadhyay
- Dilip Roy
- Chinmoy Roy as Anandamoyee's husband
- Premanshu Bose
- Juin Banerjee as Alpana, Robi's love interest

== Reception ==
The film dominated the 1969 BFJA Awards, besides winning the National Award for Best Feature Film in Bengali. Three years later, Tapan Sinha returned to the problems faced by urban youth in Ekhoni.

== Preservation ==
Apanjan has been restored and digitised by the National Film Archive of India.

== Remake ==
In 1971, Gulzar made his directorial debut with Mere Apne, which was almost a frame by frame remake of Apanjan. It starred Meena Kumari in the lead role which was successful at Box office.

== Awards ==
16th National Film Awards

- National Film Award for Best Feature Film in Bengali

Bengal Film Journalists' Association Awards (1969)

- Best Indian film (jointly with 9 others)
- Best Director - Tapan Sinha
- Best Screenplay - Tapan Sinha
- Best Actor In a Supporting Role - Samit Bhanja
- Best Male Playback Singer - Shyamal Mitra
- Best Cinematography (Black And White) - Bimal Mukherjee
- Best Editing - Subodh Roy
- Best Audiography - Anil Talukdar and Atul Chatterjee
