= Chaiti Ghoshal =

Indian actress

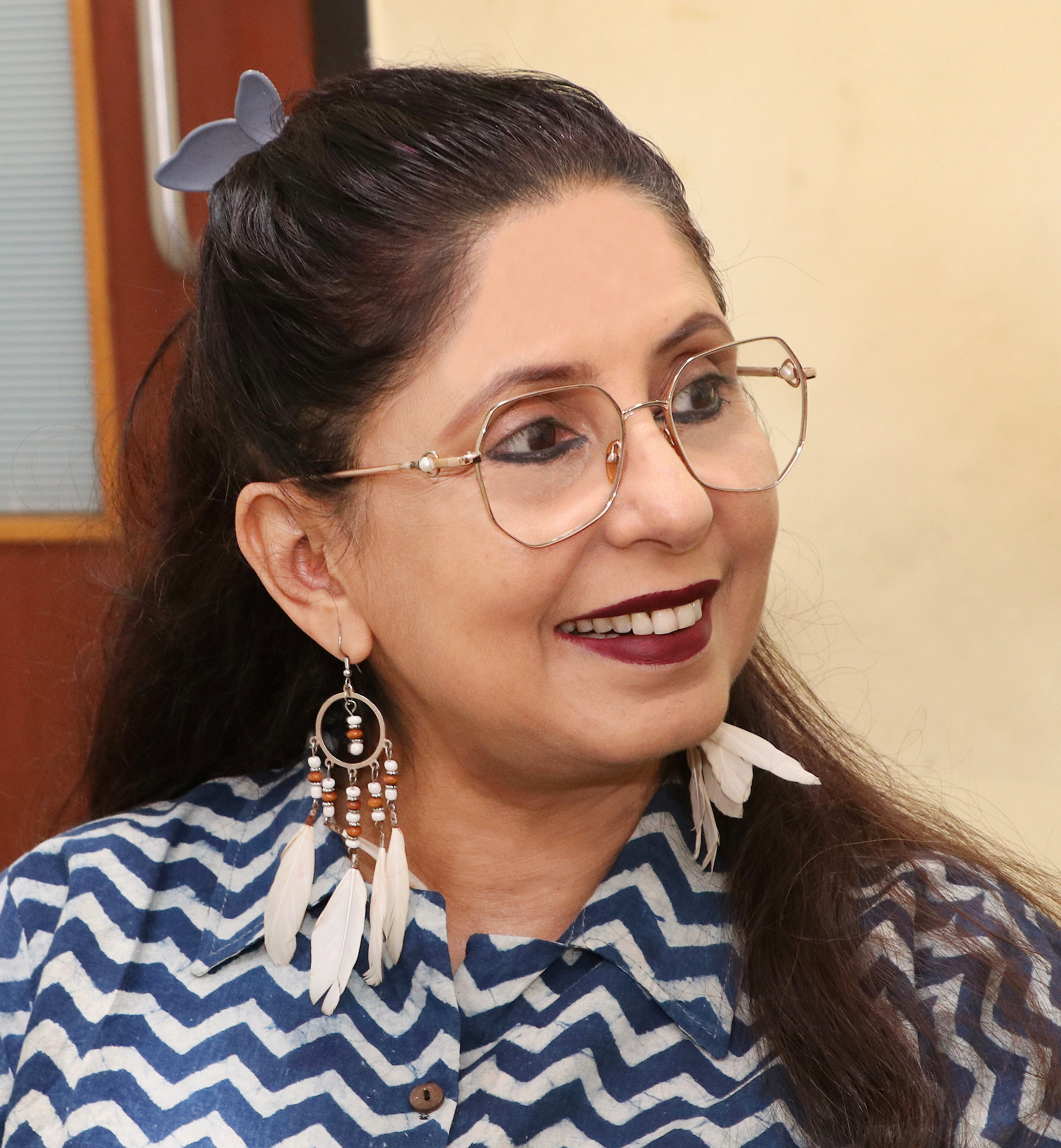
- Born: 8th April; Kolkata, West Bengal, India.
- Occupations: Actress, Director
- Known for: Theatre, Film and Television Acting
- Spouse: Ranajit Ray
- Children: Amartya Ray
- Father: Shyamal Ghoshal
- Relatives: Mitali Ghoshal

Chaiti Ghoshal is an acclaimed Indian actress primarily known for her work in Bengali film, theatre and television, with appearances in Hindi films. The daughter of actor Shyamal Ghoshal, she began her career as a child artist with Tripti Mitra and Sombhu Mitra debuting as Amol with Bohurpee's iconic production of Rabindranath Tagore's Dakghar. She went on to work with celebrated directors such as Aparna Sen, Goutam Ghose, Ravi Ojha, Subhadra Chowdhury etc.

Ghoshal garnered critical acclaim for her role as Madhabi in the iconic television production Ek Akasher Niche which also brought her widespread recognition along with popular productions like Jamai Raja and Neel Seemana. She has also been lauded for her portrayals of Tagore's female characters notably Nandini from Raktakarabi. Her Hindi films include Parama and 22 Yards.

In the recent past Chaiti has broadened her horizons by debuting as a director with her feature film Nevermind, starring Rituparna Sengupta and Amartya Ray. She has also revived her father's theatre troupe Offbeat Theatre, directing a successful production of Raktakarabi.

== Filmography ==
Year	Film	Director	Role
2026	NEVERMIND	Chaiti Ghoshal	
2026	An Intimate Affair	Sandeep Kumar Paul	
2025	Ami Jokhon Hema Malini	Paramita Munshi	
2022	Mission Everest	Debaditya Bandhopadhyay	
2022	Jibon Khatar Proti Patai	Dipak Sanyal	
2019	22 yards	Mitali Ghoshal	Trishna Ray
2019	Koler Gaan	Pranab Mukherjee	
2017	Messi	Riingo Bannerjee	Malati
2015	Ek Je Ache Shohor	Riingo Bannerjee	
2012	Na Hannyate	Ringo Banerjee	
2004	Prohor	Subhadra Chowdhury	
2003	Abar Aranye	Goutam Ghose	Chaiti
1999	Atmiyoswajan	Raja Sen	
1994	Mehtaron Ke Basti Mein Karn Kunti Samvad	Shyamal Ghosal	
1993	Tomar Rokte Amar Sohag	Ram Mukerji	
1989	Sonar Payra	Mriganka Sekhar Roy	
1985	Parama	Aparna Sen	Isha

== Television ==
- Ek Akasher Niche as Madhabi
- Neel Seemana
- Mohona
- Manik
- Jamai Raja
- Tomay Amay Mile as Chitra Mitra (small role)
- Arakshaniya as Atul's mother
- Bouma Ekghor
- Canning er Minu
- Anurager Chhowa
- Detective Charulata

== Awards ==
- Zee Bangla Sonar Sansar 2018- Priyo Evergreen Maa as BB in Jamai Raja

== See also ==
- Manasi Sinha
- Laboni Sarkar
