= Chhuti =

- The poster of the film
- Directed by: Arundhati Devi
- Screenplay by: Arundhati Devi
- Based on: Kharkuto by Bimal Kar
- Starring: Ajitesh Bandopadhyay; Mrinal Mukherjee; Nandini Maliya
- Cinematography: Bimal Mukherjee
- Edited by: Subodh Roy
- Music by: Arundhati Devi
- Production company: Purnima Pictures
- Release date: 1967
- Running time: 119 minutes
- Country: India
- Language: Bengali

Chhuti ( English: A Vacation) is a 1967 Bengali film, based on a novel by Bimal Kar. It marked the directorial debut of Arundhati Devi, who also wrote the screenplay and composed the music for the film. At the 14th National Film Awards, it won the National Film Award for Best Film Based on High Literary Work. It also won a number of BFJA Awards, including Best Director.

== Synopsis ==
The film is set in a small town in Bihar (now Jharkhand). All the main characters belong to a Bengali Christian community settled there. Bhramar (Nandini Maliya) is a teenage girl who lives with her father (Ajitesh Bandopadhyay) and her stepmother (Debabrati Sen). She is quiet and solitary, and remains sad since her relationship with her stepmother is not good. She has a good singing voice, but cannot tell anyone about her aspiration to become a singer. A young man, Amal (Mrinal Mukherjee) comes to spend his vacation with them. The two fall in love. Amal encourages Bhramar to sing, and they spend some good moments together. Bhramar, however, has been ill for some time, and has hidden the fact from everybody. Finally, her illness becomes too severe to be concealed. She is diagnosed with leukemia, and has to be hospitalised. Amal, aware that her illness is probably terminal, promises to wait for her.

== Cast ==
- Nandini Maliya as Bhramar
- Mrinal Mukherjee as Amal
- Ajitesh Bandopadhyay as Bhramar's father
- Debabrati Sen as Himani (Bhramar's stepmother)
- Nirmal Chatterjee as Dr Majumdar

== Crew ==
- Direction - Arundhati Devi
- Cinematography - Bimal Mukherjee
- Editing - Subodh Roy
- Music - Arundhati Devi

== Production ==
The film was shot on location in and around the hill town of McCluskieganj, in present-day Jharkhand.

== Reception ==
When released, the film's simple story of young love appealed to audiences. The use of Rabindra Sangeet added to its attraction. The three Tagore songs sung by Pratima Banerjee and Chinmoy Chatterjee remain popular to this day. Banerjee received the BFJA Award for Best Playback Singer (Female).

The film was also critically acclaimed, winning a National Award and several BFJA Awards. The Encyclopedia of Indian Cinema describes Chhuti as a "lyrical melodrama", and observes that "... it distances itself from the tradition of popular romances addressing similar themes of terminal illness - by a literal process of exclusion."

According to Upperstall, Arundhati Devi's move to filmmaking with Chhuti was "a major step in breaking the patriarchal Tollygunje Studio set-up". It adds that the film "exploited the sylvan surroundings ... to the hilt with some wonderful lyrical imagery."

== Preservation ==
The film has been restored and digitised by the National Film Archive of India.

== Home media ==
Chhuti is available in VCD format.

== Awards ==
- 14th National Film Awards -- National Film Award for Best Film Based on High Literary Work
- BFJA Awards 1968
  - Best Indian Films (along with 8 others)
  - Best Director -- Arundhati Devi
  - Best Screenplay—Arundhati Devi
  - Best Dialogue -- Bimal Kar
  - Best Editing—Subodh Roy
  - Best Playback Singer (Female) -- Pratima Banerjee
  - Special Award—Nandini Maliya
