= Ketaki Dutta =

Bengali theatre and film actress

- Born: 13 July 1934; Calcutta (now Kolkata)
- Died: 7 July 2003 (aged 68); Kolkata, West Bengal
- Spouse: Mohan Dutta (m.1950)

Ketaki Dutta was an actor of Bengali theatre and films. She was also a singer.

Chapal Bhaduri is one of her siblings.

== Career ==
Dutta was in the theatre profession from childhood.

== Filmography ==
Year	Title	Role(s)	Director(s)	Note	Ref.
1950	Kankal	Anima	Naresh Mitra		
1953	The Citizen		Ritwik Ghatak	Released in 1977	
1972	Padi Pishir Barmi Baksha				
1989	Sati		Aparna Sen		
2000	Chaka	Mashi	Nepaldev Bhattacharjee	Cameo	

== Bibliography ==
- Ketaki Dutta: in her own words and fragmentary pieces – Samik Bandyopadhyay - ISBN 978-93-81703-19-9
