= Mone Mone =

1989 film

- Directed by: Partha Pratim Chowdhury
- Starring: Satabdi Roy; Prosenjit Chatterjee; Nirmal Kumar; Satya Bandyopadhyay
- Music by: Kanu Bhattacharya
- Production company: Jaganmata Pictures
- Release date: 1989
- Running time: 125 min
- Country: India
- Language: Bengali

Mone Mone is a 1989 Bengali romance drama film directed by Partha Pratim Chowdhury and music composed by Kanu Bhattacharya. This film was released on 1 January 1989.

== Cast ==
- Satabdi Roy
- Prosenjit Chatterjee
- Nirmal Kumar
- Subhendu Chatterjee
- Satya Bandyopadhyay
