= Mere Apne =

- Directed by: Gulzar
- Written by: Indra Mitra; Gulzar
- Based on: Apanjan by Tapan Sinha
- Produced by: N. C. Sippy; Raj N. Sippy; Romu N. Sippy
- Starring: Meena Kumari; Vinod Khanna; Shatrughan Sinha
- Cinematography: K Vaikunth
- Edited by: Waman Bhosle; Gurudutt Shirali
- Music by: Salil Choudhury
- Release date: 10 September 1971
- Country: India
- Language: Hindi
- Box office: ₹ 1.7 crore

Mere Apne (Note: Literally "my own", by extension meaning "my own people". It is a sarcastic reference to the ill-treatment of the protagonist by "her own people"; first by "tricking" her into working for them as a maid, and later even causing her death.) is a 1971 Indian Hindi-language film written and directed by Gulzar in his directorial debut and produced by Romu, Raj and N. C. Sippy. A remake of the 1968 Bengali film Apanjan, it was the first movie of Vinod Khanna as Hero. This was also debut movie of Danny. The film stars Meena Kumari, Vinod Khanna and Shatrughan Sinha in lead roles along with Deven Verma, Paintal, Asit Sen, Asrani, Danny Denzongpa, Keshto Mukherjee, A. K. Hangal, Dinesh Thakur, Mehmood and Yogeeta Bali. The music of the film is composed by Salil Choudhury.

Mere Apne was declared " Hit " at the box office.

== Plot ==
Anandi Devi (Meena Kumari) is an old widow who lives in a village. One day, she is visited by a distant relative, Arun Gupta (Ramesh Deo), who persuades her to live in town with him, his wife Lata (Sumita Sanyal), and a small child. She later realizes that they were looking for a maid, which results in her expulsion from the house and befriending a child beggar who takes her to his dilapidated home. Being good-natured and caring, she slowly earns the title of "Nani Ma" (maternal grandmother) among groups of youths led by Shyam (Vinod Khanna) and Chhenu (Shatrughan Sinha), who were in a constant fight with each other. At one time in the movie, she asks them why don't they go to the "madarsa" to study, insinuating that a) colleges are not worth going since, as the movie-plot consistently points out, they witness strikes most of the time, and b) this killing of time could have been avoided. The movie ends with her death from accidental gunfire in one such response.

== Cast ==
- Meena Kumari as Anandi Devi
- Vinod Khanna as Shyam
- Shatrughan Sinha as Chhenu
- Deven Verma as Niranjan, Anandi's deceased husband
- Asrani as Raghunath, Chhenu's team mate
- Danny Denzongpa as Sanju
- Yogesh Chhabra as Pandey part of Shatrughan Sinha’s team
- Paintal as Bansi
- Dinesh Thakur as Billoo
- Sudhir Thakkar as Ranbir
- Ramesh Deo as Arun Gupta
- Sumita Sanyal as Lata
- Mehmood as Sri Anokhelal
- Asit Sen as Biloki Prasad
- Abhi Bhattacharya as Freedom Fighter
- Leela Mishra as Gupta's maidservant
- Shashi Kiran as Neelu
- Keshto Mukherjee as Jattu
- Dev Kishan as Shyam's father
- A. K. Hangal as College Principal
- Yogeeta Bali as Urmila
- Kamaldeep as Urmila's father (as Kamal Deep)
- Fatima as Julie
- Amina Karim as Young Anandi

== Production ==
After Apanjan, directed by Tapan Sinha, is based on a story of Inder Mitra, was both a commercial and critical success. Screenwriter Gulzar was called to Kolkata to translate the script for a Hindi remake. However, subsequently Sinha insisted on using the same cast, and dropped out of the film. Then, Gulzar, who till then was assisting Bimal Roy and Hrishikesh Mukherjee and penned screenplays of Khamoshi (1969) and Anand (1971), made his directorial debut with the film. Gulzar bought the rights of the story, and rewrote the screenplay removing the portions he felt were too formulaic and commercial.

Gulzar, in an interview revealed that N. C. Sippy, the producer of the film, wanted actress Nimmi in the grandmother's role. Gulzar however was keen on Chhaya Devi, who played that role in the original. It was Meena Kumari who was finally given the role of grandmother on Gulzar and Romu Sippy's insistence. Kumari who was ailing at the time, worked through her bad health in the film. The shooting was completed in 40 days. Only the song, Chand Katora Liye Bhikaran... couldn't be picturised on Kumari as she was in no condition to come to the sets, being on the last stage of her illness. Mere Apne was the last film she shot for and would often joke with the young actors, 'This director is pushing you so hard, at least you can ask him to host you a beer party'. However, that party never happened as she died soon after the release of the film.

== Soundtrack ==
All lyrics are written by Gulzar; all music is composed by Salil Choudhary.

Songs
No.	Title	Playback	Length
1.	"Haal Chal Theek Thak Hai"	Kishore Kumar, Mukesh	5:16
2.	"Koi Hota Jisko Apna"	Kishore Kumar	3:27
3.	"Roz Akeli aye"	Lata Mangeshkar	3:20
4.	"Ganga, Ganga Ki Bhari God Mein"	Manna Dey	3:08

== Bibliography ==
- Ghosh, Avijit (2013). 40 RETAKES. Westland. ISBN 978-93-83260-31-7.
- Gulzar (2007). Mere Apne (Hindi script). Rajkamal Prakashan Pvt Ltd. ISBN 978-81-8361-137-4.
