= Raikamal =

1955 Bengali romantic drama film

- Directed by: Subodh Mitra
- Written by: Tarashankar Banerjee
- Screenplay by: Binoy Chatterjee (dialogues also)
- Story by: Tarashankar Banerjee
- Starring: Kaberi Bose; Uttam Kumar; Sabitri Chatterjee; Chhabi Biswas; Asit Baran
- Cinematography: Amulya Mukherjee
- Edited by: Subodh Mitra
- Music by: Pankaj Kumar Mallick
- Production company: Aurora Film Corporation P. Ltd.
- Distributed by: Aurora Film Corporation P. Ltd.
- Release date: 8 March 1955
- Running time: 116 minutes
- Country: India
- Language: Bengali

Raikamal is a Bengali drama film directed by Subodh Mitra. The film stars Kaberi Bose, Uttam Kumar, Sabitri Chatterjee, Chandrabati Devi and others. Pankaj Kumar Mallick composed music in the film. This film was released on 8 March 1955. Kaberi Bose was debuted in the film. This is the first work of Uttam Kumar under Aurora Film Corporation. The film is remembered as one of the best films starring Uttam Kumar and in the early stage of Bengali cinema. The film became hugely successful at the box office.

== Plot ==
Rai Kamak is a devotee of Krishna. Rai and Ranjan have loved each other since childhood and want to marry, but the two face several problems because they belong to different castes.

== Cast ==
- Uttam Kumar
- Sabitri Chatterjee
- Kaberi Bose as Raikamal
- Nitish Mukhopadhyay
- Chandrabati Debi
- Panchanan Bhattacharya
- Parijat Bose
- Naba Gopal Lahiri

== Soundtrack ==
Raikamal

Soundtrack album by Pankaj Kumar Mallick
- Released: 1955
- Recorded: 1954
- Studio: Aurora Films Corporation
- Genre: Feature film soundtrack
- Length: 0:28:35
- Label: Angel Digital

Pankaj Kumar Mallick chronology
Chitrangada (1954)	Raikamal (1955)

All lyrics are written by Atulprasad Sen, Tarashankar Bandopadhyay, Sailen Roy; all music is composed by Pankaj Kumar Mallick.

Songs
No.	Title	Playback	Length
1.	"Jodi Tor Hrid Jamona"	Pankaj Kumar Mallick	2:19
2.	"Phutlo Raikamalini"	Pankaj Kumar Mallick	2:21
3.	"O Amar Darun Nanadi"	Chhabi Banerjee	1:09
4.	"Gorar Sera Gora Chand"	Pankaj Kumar Mallick	0:55
5.	"Mathurate Thakle Pore"	Pankaj Kumar Mallick	0:43
6.	"Dekhe Elam Tare Sakhi"	Chhabi Banerjee	4:46
7.	"Badhu Onek Kandaye"	Chhabi Banerjee	3:31
8.	"Piya Jab Aawaba"	Chhabi Banerjee	2:15
9.	"Bidaghda Jouban"	Chhabi Banerjee	3:27
10.	"Mandir Tyaji"	Chhabi Banerjee	3:39
11.	"Brindaban Bilashini"	Pankaj Kumar Mallick	2:53
12.	"Badhu Tomar Garabe"	Chhabi Banerjee	2:35
Total length:			28:35

== Reception ==
The film is remembered one of the best films starring Uttam Kumar. It become superhit and critically acclaimed and was a milestone as the first Indian film showed in foreign television.

== Awards ==
- National Film Award
- 1956: Certificate of Merit, 3rd best feature film in Bengali
