= Chapal Bhaduri =

Indian theatre artist, impersonator

- Born: 1938 (age 87–88); Kolkata, West Bengal, India
- Other name: Chapalrani
- Occupation: Actor
- Years active: 1955–present
- Parent(s): Tara Kumar Bhaduri (Father); Prava Devi (Mother)

Chapal Bhaduri is the last living female impersonator in Bengali theatre and perhaps even in Indian theatre. He did female impersonation in Jatra, a form of Bengali folk theatre as Chapalrani. In 2010, he starred in a Bengali Film Arekti Premer Golpo which was directed by Kaushik Ganguly and written by Ganguly and Rituparno Ghosh.

== Early life ==
He was born at Kolkata's Kali Dutta lane, as the youngest child of Tara Kumar Bhaduri, a theatre actor and Prava Devi, a theatre and film actress. Later in 1939, his family moved to Badamtala Lane of Goabagan area of Kolkata. He had three brothers and two sisters. Noted actor and singer, Ketaki Dutta is Bhaduri's youngest sister. With the backing of her mother, his acting career started at the age of only seven at Srirangam Theatre [now known as Biswarupa located at Northern Kolkata] where he played the role of Apurba in Sarat Chandra Chattopadhyay's Bindur Chele. Later in 1955, he performed in Bengali Theatre named Ali Baba where he played the female character of Marjina.

== Acting career ==
=== Theatre ===
His voice is very thin and soft and has a distinctly female tenor. After performing a female character in Ali Baba he was flooded with the female role in theatre. His performances in Raja Debidas, Chand Bibi, Sultana Razia and Mahiyashi Kaikeyi were big hits at that time and he became the leading lady of Bengal's jatra in the name of Chapalrani or Queen-Chapal. In the 1960s he was the highest paid 'actress' of Bengali Theatre. Chapal Bhaduri joined Natto Company in 1958. In the late sixties when women started to act in the theatre he found himself at a wrong end to cope up with the modern trend and he had to quit. In this time he worked with Kamala Production. Later he started to play Goddess Ma Shitala. His role in the semi-autobiographical Ramanimohan, a play produced in 2006, was his first full-length role as a male character,

=== Film ===
He was seen in tele-film Ushnotar Jonne and the film Arekti Premer Golpo. Both of these were directed by Kaushik Ganguly.

== Depictions in popular culture ==
Chapal Bhaduri revived into fame after Naveen Kishore of the Seagull Foundation for the Arts had made a 44-minute documentary on the actor in 1999. Performing the Goddess — The Chapal Bhaduri Story focuses light on the man, who challenged financial penury to create a new performance — a monologue of Goddess Shitala. A tele-film Ushnotar Jonne, directed by Kaushik Ganguly also depicts part of his life. In this telefilm he made a cameo appearance. The third one is Arekti Premer Golpo, a feature film directed by Kaushik Ganguly in which he narrates his life on camera. Presently Bhaduri lives in an old age home in North Kolkata.
