= Bindur Chhele (1973 film) =

- Directed by: Guru Bagchi
- Screenplay by: Bikash Ray
- Story by: Bindur Chhele by Sarat Chandra Chattopadhyay
- Produced by: Satish Mukherjee
- Starring: Madhabi Mukherjee; Sandhyarani; Bikash Roy; Bhanu Bandopadhyay; Nirmal Kumar; Asit Baran
- Cinematography: Bijoy Dey
- Edited by: Kamal Gangopadhyay
- Music by: Kalipada Sen
- Production company: S. S. Production
- Distributed by: Mega Pictures
- Release date: 24 August 1973
- Country: India
- Language: Bengali

Bindur Chhele (Bindu's Son) is a Bengali family drama film directed by Guru Bagchi and produced by Satish Mukherjee, based on Sarat Chandra Chattopadhyay's 1913 novel of the same name. The film was released on 24 August 1973 under the banner of Mega Pictures.

== Plot ==
Bindubasini lives in joint family with her husband Madhab. Being childess Bindu takes over the upbringing of Amulya, Madhav's elder brother's son. Amulya comes to regard Bindu as his true mother. Some misunderstanding creates between the family members for Amulya but finally they reunite.

== Cast ==
- Madhabi Mukherjee as Bindu
- Nirmal Kumar as Madhab
- Sandhyarani as Annapurna
- Bikash Roy as Jadab
- Bhanu Bandopadhyay as Bhola
- Padma Devi
- Asit Baran
- Nripati Chattopadhyay
- Ajanta Chowdhury
- Nilima Das
- Premangshu Bose
- Gour Shee
- Nirmal Ghosh
- Kalipada Chakraborty
