= Bouma Ekghor =

2022 Bengali television series

- Genre: Family drama; Comedy
- Created by: Dialogues; Sourav Sengupta
- Screenplay by: Malay Bandhopadhyay
- Story by: Susanta Das; Sayanti Bhattacharya
- Directed by: Arghya Roychowdhury
- Creative director: Tanmay Chakraborty
- Presented by: Abhishek; Kajalkanti
- Starring: Susmita Dey; Debojyoti Roy Chowdhury
- Opening theme: Bouma Ekghor
- Composers: Prosen; Amit Sur
- Country of origin: India
- Original language: Bengali
- No. of seasons: 1
- No. of episodes: 86

Production
- Executive producers: Paroma; Lopamudra (Star Jalsha); Sandy; Sushmita Bhattacharya; Soumi Dutta
- Producers: Sylendra Kumar Das; Susanta Das (Tent Cinema)
- Production location: Kolkata
- Cinematography: Ashok Pramanik
- Editors: Amitav Bagchi; Subhajit Kar
- Camera setup: Multi-camera
- Running time: 22 minutes
- Production company: Tent Cinema

Original release
- Network: Star Jalsha
- Release: 2 May – 5 August 2022

Related
- Khukumoni Home Delivery

Bouma Ekghor is a 2022 Bengali comedy drama television series that premiered on 2 May 2022 on Bengali General Entertainment Channel Star Jalsha. The show has been produced by Susanta Das under the banner of Tent Cinema. The show stars Susmita Dey, Debojyoti Roy Chowdhury, Chaiti Ghosal, Nibedita Mukherjee, and Aakash Ghosh.

Due to less TRPs, not being too popular and as audiences didn't like the show so much, the serial went off-air on 5 August with 86 episodes.

== Plot ==
The story is about two brothers and their families. One of them enjoys a luxurious lifestyle and is modern, while the other has some financial issues. The wives of the families compete with each other to prove whose daughter-in-law is better. Raju, who dreams of being an automobile engineer, works in a garage due to circumstances. Tia, a girl who daydreams, and has no wish to get a job, marries Raju, a son of the Ghosh family. Raju's mother finally finds a way to beat her sister-in-law in the competition, and she presents Tia as a working woman. She tells the family that her new daughter-in-law is a careerist and works in a well known company. But the problem turns up when the family suspects the fact. Raju's mother continuously pursues Tia to look for a job to save her reputation, but Tia is reluctant in her words. This process of finding a job in an 'unwanted' manner leads to a funny series of events.

== Cast ==
=== Main ===
- Susmita Dey as Tiya Ghosh (née Mondal) – A carefree girl who has no wish to work and to go Dubai after marriage; Raju's wife
- Debojyoti Roy Chowdhury as Raju Ghosh – A garage mechanic, who dreamt of becoming an automobile engineer; Tiya's husband

=== Recurring ===
- Nibedita Mukherjee as Bishnupriya Ghosh – Raju's mother, Tiya's mother-in-law
- Subrata Guha Roy as Notu Ghosh- Raju's father, Tiya's father-in-law
- Chaiti Ghoshal as Snigdha Ghosh – Raju's aunt
- Arindam Ganguly as Botu Ghosh- Snigdha's husband, Raju's uncle
- Rajiv Bose as Aalok Ghosh –Notu and Priya's son, Raju and Pulok's brother, Champa's husband
- Laboni Bhattacharya as Champa Ghosh - Aalok's wife
- Sudip Sarkar as Pulak Ghosh- Notu and Priya's son, Raju and Aalok's brother, Bulbuli's husband
- Somashree Naskar as Bulbuli Ghosh- Pulak's wife
- Indrajit Majumder as Ayan Ghosh- Botu and Snigdha's son, Rishita's husband; the eldest Ghosh family son
- Arnab Biswas as Dev Ghosh- Botu and Snigdha's son, Riya's husband
- Aritra Dutta as Ani Ghosh - Botu and Snigdha's son, Titas's husband
- Jina Tarafder as Titas Ghosh - Ani's wife
- Aditi Ghosh as Riya Ghosh - Tiya's cousin sister who dislikes Tiya; Dev's wife
- Riya Dutta as Rishita Ghosh - Ayan's wife
