= Ajab Gayer Ajab Katha =

1998 Bengali film

- Poster
- Directed by: Tapan Sinha
- Screenplay by: Tapan Sinha
- Based on: Nabigunjer Daitya by Shirshendu Mukhopadhyay
- Produced by: Shree Venkatesh Films
- Starring: Soumitra Chatterjee; Debashree Roy; Debesh Roychowdhury; Nirmal Kumar; Manoj Mitra; Kaushik Sen; Rajatava Dutta
- Cinematography: Soumendu Roy
- Music by: Tapan Sinha
- Distributed by: Shree Venkatesh Films
- Release date: 20 October 1998
- Country: India
- Language: Bengali

Ajab Gayer Ajab Katha (transl. The Strange Story of a Strange Village) is a 1998 Bengali-language comedy horror film co-written and directed by Tapan Sinha. Produced by Shrikant Mohta under the banner of Shree Venkatesh Films, the film is based on Shirshendu Mukhopadhyay's novel Nabiganjer Doityo. the plot follows a group of villagers who attempt to save their king Birchandra from an invasion launched a group of scumbags. It stars Soumitra Chatterjee, Debashree Roy, Debesh Roychowdhury, Nirmal Kumar, Manoj Mitra, Kaushik Sen and Rajatava Dutta. It was the last complete movie made by Sinha.

== Plot ==
Birchandra, the king without a kingdom lives alone in his palace at Nabiganj village. He is least bothered about his kinghood and hidden royal treasure. Few villagers take undue advantage of his indifference. One unknown bodybuilder Kinkar comes to the village and loses his memory. Birchandra gives him shelter. Local teacher Dukkhoharan and an old priest of the village realises that some criminals may attack Birchandra for the king's treasure that is hidden below his palace.

== Cast ==
- Soumitra Chatterjee as King Birchandra
- Debesh Roy Chowdhury as Dukhoharan
- Debashree Roy as Tiya
- Nirmal Kumar as Basab, Tiya's uncle
- Manoj Mitra as Madhab Ghoshal, the priest
- Bibhash Chakraborty as the headmaster
- Kaushik Sen as the thief
- Dheeman Chakraborty
- Rajatava Dutta as Harris, the scumbag
- Shankar Roy
- Jiban Guha as Keshta
- Barun Chakraborty
- Niladri Bhattacharya
- Falguni Banerjee
- Sanmay Ganguly as Naren, the juggler
- Ranjit Chowdhury
- Ajay Bhattacharya
