= Detective Charulata =

Indian Bengali language crime and thriller web series

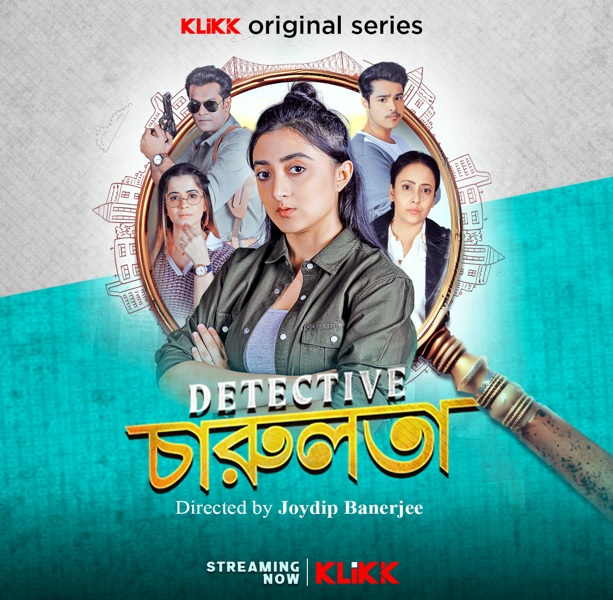
- Genre: Detective, Thriller
- Screenplay by: Soumit Deb
- Story by: Soumit Deb
- Directed by: Joydip Banerjee
- Starring: Surangana Bandyopadhyay, Debmalya Gupta, Chaiti Ghoshal, Anujoy Chattopadhyay, Pooja Sarkar, Manas Mukherjee
- Music by: Pranjal Das
- Country of origin: India
- Original language: Bengali
- No. of seasons: 1
- No. of episodes: 5

Production
- Producer: Aakash Bhowmick
- Cinematography: Anir

Original release
- Release: 10 April 2025

Detective Charulata is a 2025 Indian Bengali language crime and thriller web series directed by Joydip Banerjee and produced by Aakash Bhowmick.

The series starring Surangana Bandyopadhyay, Debmalya Gupta, Chaiti Ghoshal, Anujoy Chattopadhyay, Pooja Sarkar, and Manas Mukherjee.

Anir is the cinematographer while music is scored by Pranjal Das.

== Synopsis ==
Private investigator Charulata Mitra and her cousin Topu typically handle conventional cases; nevertheless, when an unsettling prophecy by a self-styled witch materializes, Charu initiates an investigation into a series of enigmatic fatalities linked to a pivotal event from thirty years prior.

== Cast ==
- Surangana Bandyopadhyay
- Debmalya Gupta
- Chaiti Ghoshal
- Anujoy Chattopadhyay
- Pooja Sarkar
- Manas Mukherjee
- Pamela Kanjilal
- Mallika Majumdar
- Sanmitra Bhaumik

== Episodes ==
No.	Title	Directed by	Original release date
1	"Charudir Goyendagiri"	Joydip Banerjee	10 April 2025
Detective Charulata Mitra often investigates ordinary crimes till she encounters her significant opportunity, the intriguing case of Mrs. Sen.
2	"Sen Barite Khunkharapi"	Joydip Banerjee	10 April 2025
Charu suspects malfeasance in Mrs. Sen's demise, as the inquiry uncovers a sinister secret within the Sen family.
3	"Kolkata-e Kelenkari"	Joydip Banerjee	10 April 2025
Charu associates the murder with a series of disparate homicides in the city. The police are currently collaborating with Charu to capture the perpetrator. Charu confronts an alternative peril.
4	"Joto Kando Katwate"	Joydip Banerjee	10 April 2025
Charu's inquiry directed the crew to Katwa in pursuit of the elusive murderer, who has been deceased for over 25 years.
5	"Khel Khotom"	Joydip Banerjee	10 April 2025
Charu devises a trap to capture the murderer, but events do not unfold as anticipated.
