= Dadu No. 1 =

- Theatrical release poster
- Directed by: Sanat Dutta
- Produced by: Naresh Kumar Jain
- Starring: Ferdous Ahmed; Ranjit Mallick; Rachana Banerjee; Indrajit Chakraborty; Mrinal Mukherjee
- Music by: Malay Ganguly
- Production company: Nikita Arts Movies
- Release date: 2004
- Country: India
- Language: Bengali

Dadu No. 1 is a 2004 Bengali film directed by Sanat Dutta and produced by Naresh Kumar Jain. The film features actors Ferdous Ahmed, Ranjit Mallick and Rachana Banerjee in the lead roles. Malay Ganguly composed the music for the film.

== Cast ==
- Ferdous Ahmed as Akash
- Ranjit Mallick as Bhabani Chatterjee
- Rachana Banerjee as Jotti
- Indrajit Chakraborty as Surya
- Mrinal Mukherjee
- Amarnath Mukhopadhyay
- Ramen Raychowdhury
- Dhiman Chakraborty
- Manjil Bandyopadhyay
- Sandhita Chatterjee

== Soundtrack ==
Dadu No. 1

Soundtrack album by Malay Ganguly
- Released: 2004
- Genre: Feature film soundtrack
- Length: 25:36

Malay Ganguly chronology
Dadu No. 1 (2004)	Adhikar (2004)

Music of Dadu No. 1 has been composed by Malay Ganguly. The soundtrack album also consists of a Rabindra Sangeet song, "Chokher Aaloy".

=== Track listing ===
No.	Title	Music	Singer(s)	Length
1.	"Aei Bhaire"	Malay Ganguly	Udit Narayan, Babul Supriyo	4:10
2.	"Koto Swapno"	Malay Ganguly	Kumar Sanu	3:34
3.	"Chokher Aaloy"	Rabindranath Tagore	Indrani Sen	4:20
4.	"Chokher Aaloy (Adlip)"	Rabindranath Tagore	Indrani Sen	1:11
5.	"Oi Chokete"	Malay Ganguly	Shreya Ghoshal, Babul Supriyo	5:01
6.	"Ami Je Du Chokhe"	Malay Ganguly	Alka Yagnik	3:47
7.	"Aj Aei Shubhodine"	Malay Ganguly	Shreya Ghoshal, Udit Narayan, Babul Supriyo	3:33
Total length:				25:36
