= Swarup Dutta =

Indian Bengali actor (1941–2019)

Swarup Dutta (22 June 1941 – 17 July 2019) was a Bengali actor. His son Saron Dutta is a director in Bengali film industry.

== Early life ==
Dutta was born in famous Dutta family of Kolkata in 1941. In 1958 he passed Matriculation from the South Point School and completed I.A. from Ramakrishna Mission Vidyamandira. Dutta graduated in economics from St. Xavier's College, Kolkata.

== Career ==
During his school days Dutta came into contact with veteran actor Utpal Dutt. He also performed with Utpal Dutt on stage. First breakthrough of his career is Apanjan, a popular drama film of Tapan Sinha released in 1968. This movie won the National Film Award. He played the role of hero and versatile parts in a number of Bengali films of the late 60s and early 70s. Dutta also acted in Hindi film Uphaar with Jaya Bhaduri in 1971. He died on 17 July 2019 at the age of 78 in a hospital of Kolkata.

== Selected filmography ==
- Apanjan
- Megh o Roudra
- Sagina Mahato
- Uphaar
- Andha Atit
- Harmonium
- Ekhoni
- Sansarer Itikatha
- Bishabriksha
- Kony (film)
- Pita Putra
- Swarnasikhar Prangane
- Maa O Meye
- Paap Punya
- Nayantara (film)
- Ora Charjon
- Sadharan Meye
