= Ekhoni =

- Aparna Sen and Swaroop Dutta in a still from Ekhoni
- Directed by: Tapan Sinha
- Written by: Ramapada Chowdhury (original story); Tapan Sinha (screenplay)
- Starring: Aparna Sen; Moushumi Chatterjee; Mrinal Mukherjee; Chinmoy Roy; Swarup Dutta; Subhendu Chatterjee
- Cinematography: Bimal Mukherjee
- Edited by: Subodh Roy
- Music by: Tapan Sinha
- Release date: 7 November 1971
- Running time: 96 minutes
- Country: India
- Language: Bengali

Ekhoni (also Ekhonee; English: Right Now) is a 1971 Bengali film directed by Tapan Sinha, starring Aparna Sen, Swarup Dutta, Moushumi Chatterjee, Mrinal Mukherjee, Chinmoy Roy and others. Based on the award-winning novel of the same name by Ramapada Chowdhury, Ekhoni was one of the earliest films to address the problems of urban youth, and to replace the individual hero by a collective protagonist. At the 19th National Film Awards, it won the National Award for Best Screenplay. It also won two BFJA Awards.

== Synopsis ==
The film follows a group of young, college-going men and women. They spend much of their time hanging out at a downbeat tea shop. There are romantic involvements and clashes with their parents and other family members. Most of all, these young people feel a sense of uncertainty about the future. Urmi (Aparna Sen) is from an affluent family and her fiancé is an engineer. All the other students are from middle-class families. Arun (Swaroop Dutta) resents being made to run small errands for his parents. Halfway through the film, the graduation ceremony of the class takes place. As they listen to the platitudes being dished out from the stage, it is brought home to them that their carefree student days are over. Sujit (Mrinal Mukherjee) is in a relationship with Runu (Moushumi Chatterjee). However, they can't think of marriage until he has a job. He goes for a job interview which turns into a nightmare. Urmi invites the whole group to her place for high tea, and introduces them to her fiancé (Subhendu Chatterjee in a special appearance). Her friends are impressed by the big house and the refined lifestyle. However, the evening only reinforces their feeling of uncertainty about the future. Soon after the tea-party, it is discovered that Arun's mother has brain cancer. Meanwhile, Biman's girl friend Nandini runs away from home, and declares that she won't go back. The whole group pools in efforts to get the couple married and find them a temporary place to live in. Tiklu, who appears to be unromantic, even cynical, diverts money from his family's printing business to help the couple, and is mercilessly beaten up. Arun and Urmi have a long conversation about life and love. Sujit stuns the group by announcing that he has landed a job. They have a celebration party at Biman and Nandini's place. Soon after, Arun's mother dies. A few days later, Arun gets a phone call from Urmi, asking him to meet her urgently. She informs him that she is pregnant, and that her fiancé has abandoned her and gone off to England. She asks him for help to "get rid of it". Arun thinks long into the night, and tells her that their friends will pick her up next morning in a taxi. When Urmi gets off the cab, she is surprised to find that they are not in an abortion clinic, but an office building. Arun tells her that they have an appointment with the registrar of marriages. Urmi protests that she has no intention of burdening him with another man's child. Arun confesses that he has always been in love with her. They get married and prepare to face an uncertain future together.

== Cast ==
The film has an ensemble cast:

- Aparna Sen as Urmi
- Moushumi Chatterjee as Runu
- Juin Banerjee as Nandini
- Swarup Dutta as Arun
- Mrinal Mukherjee as Sujit
- Bhaskar Chowdhury as Biman
- Chinmoy Roy as The Intellectual
- N. Viswanathan
- Rudraprasad Sengupta
- Gita Dey
- Anubha Gupta
- Padma Devi
- Subhendu Chatterjee -as Ayan special appearance as Urmi's fiancé
- Nirmal Kumar - special appearance
- Shambhu Bhattacharya
- Dilip Bose as Tiklu
- Nirmal Ghosh as Atin

== Reception ==
After Apanjan, Ekhoni was the second film by Tapan Sinha to deal with urban issues. According to one reviewer, it "created a stir in the society". In any case, it was popular at the time, since young urban viewers could identify with the protagonists. As in the earlier film, the unexpected use of Rabindrasangeet in the film added to its attraction.

The film also enjoyed critical success, winning a National Award and two BFJA Awards. Aparna Sen lists Ekhoni as one of the films she cherishes having acted in.

Scholar Moinak Biswas writes: " The emergence of a collective protagonist - the unemployed, angry youth, roaming the urban landscape, temporarily displacing and probably permanently changing the nature of the individual male hero and the romantic couple, signaled a major shift in the practice of cinema across the art-popular divide." He adds: "The character galleries that Sinha creates in Apanjan, and in some ways more poignantly in Ekhoni and Raja, are memorable archives of the times."

== Preservation ==
The negative of the film is not available in complete form. According to Anindya Sinha, Tapan Sinha's son, the version that is available has only 40 minutes of the movie. However, there is a version uploaded on YouTube, which, although not of good quality, appears to have close to the full running length. It is not clear whether the company under whose imprint it is uploaded has acquired the rights to this digital version.

== Awards ==
- 19th National Film Awards: Best Screenplay - Tapan Sinha
- BFJA Awards (1972)
  - Best Indian Films
  - Best Actor in a Supporting Role - Chinmoy Roy
