= Aandha Prem =

- VCD cover
- Directed by: Narayan Chatterjee
- Screenplay by: Shaktipada Rajguru
- Story by: Shaktipada Rajguru
- Produced by: Shiv Films
- Starring: Prosenjit Chatterjee; Rachana Banerjee
- Cinematography: Shakti Bannerjee; Shyamal Bannerjee
- Edited by: Swapan Guha
- Music by: Babul Bose
- Production company: Shiv Films
- Distributed by: Shiv Films
- Release date: 12 June 2003
- Country: India
- Language: Bengali

Aandha Prem is a 2003 Bengali romantic drama film directed by Narayan Chatterjee under the banner of Shiv Films. The film features actors Prosenjit Chatterjee and Rachana Banerjee in the lead roles. Music of the film has been composed by Babul Bose.

== Plot ==
Sima and Bijoy are two college students who initially hate each other. However, with time, they fall in love, but face opposition from Sima's wealthy father.

== Cast ==
- Prosenjit Chatterjee as Bijoy
- Rachana Banerjee as Sima
- Laboni Sarkar
- Deepankar De
- Anuradha Ray
- Mrinal Mukherjee
- Koushik Bandyopadhyay
- Nabamita Chattopadhyay
- Joy Badlani
- Kalyani Mondal
