= Kalyan Chatterjee =

Indian actor (1942–2025)

- Born: 1942; Berhampore, Bengal Province, British India
- Died: 7 December 2025 (aged 81–83) (Note: There is a conflict between his reported age at death, 81, and the potential age range calculated from his reported birth year, 1942 (age 82–83). A reliable source is needed for his birth date and year to resolve this.); Kolkata, West Bengal, India
- Occupation: Actor
- Years active: 1966–2024

Kalyan Chatterjee (Bengali: কল্যাণ চ্যাটার্জী; 1942 – 7 December 2025) was an Indian actor recognised for his work in Bengali cinema, and considered to be one of the most famous supporting actors of Bengali cinema. He worked with actors like Sabitri Chatterjee, Ranjit Mallick, Uttam Kumar, Soumitra Chatterjee, Santu Mukhopadhyay and Dipankar Dey.

== Career ==
Chatterjee's first film Apanjan was released in 1968. He acted in more than 400 films portraying the role of a typical Bengali man and was acclaimed by viewers for his natural acting skill. He portrayed characters of different shades in 'Dhonni Meye ' (1971), 'Sagina' (1974), He was a favourite actor of directors Tapan Sinha and Arabinda Mukhopadhyay.

== Death ==
Chatterjee died at M. R. Bangur Hospital in Kolkata, on 7 December 2025, at the age of 81, after a prolonged illness and a battle with typhoid fever.

== Selected filmography ==
1. Apanjan (1968)
2. Pratidwandi (1970)
3. Sagina Mahato (1970) (Hindi)
4. Dhanyee Meye (1971)
5. Ajker Nayak (1972)
6. Paar (1973)
7. Sabuj Dwiper Raja (1973)
8. Sagina (film) (1974)
9. Ek Je Chhilo Desh (1978)
10. Safed Haathi (1978)
11. Aadmi Aur Aurat (1984)
12. Kahan Kahan Se Guzar (1986)
13. Antarjali Jatra (1987)
14. Garmil (1990)
15. Agni Kanya (1990)
16. Surer Bhubane (1992)
17. Rupban Kanya (1992)
18. Sunyo theke Suru (1993)
19. Bada Din (1998)
20. Chaka (2010)
21. Dattak
22. Bidhatar Lekha (2007)
23. Ektu Bhalobasar Janno (2008)
24. Sadhu Babar Lathi (2008)
25. The Waiting City (2009)
26. Juadi (2009)
27. Byomkesh Bakshi (2010)
28. Dui Prithibi (2010)
29. Baishe Srabon (2011)
30. Sugar Baby(2011)
31. Antore Bahire (2012)
32. Chittagong (film) (2012)
33. Kahaani (2012) (HINDI)
34. Kono Ek Robibar (2014)
35. Alo Chaya (2014)
36. Durga (2015)
37. Vinash (2016)
38. Postmaster (2016)
39. Bastav (2016)
40. Ei To Jeebon (2017)
41. Nirbhoya (2018)
42. 22 Yards(2018)
43. The Complete Life (2020 short)
44. An Irrelevant Dialogue
45. Private Practice
46. Kshatrap
47. The Waltz
48. Tadanta
49. Phire Phire Chai
50. Apod
51. Agni kanya
52. Tista parer Kainya
53. Notun Diner Alo
54. Alor Thikana
55. Sparshaa
56. Hatey Roilo Pistol
57. Brishbrikhya
58. Tin Adhyay
59. Akash Ekhono Nil
60. Chirutha
61. Din Amader
62. Sap-Ludo
63. Tansener Tanpura (2020 web series)
64. Sona Dadu (2024)
