= Sabuj Dwiper Raja =

- Sabuj Dwiper Raja poster
- Directed by: Tapan Sinha
- Screenplay by: Tapan Sinha
- Story by: Sunil Gangopadhyay
- Based on: Sabuj Dwiper Raja by Sunil Gangopadhyay
- Produced by: Children's Film Society, India
- Starring: Samit Bhanja; Lily Chakravarty; Biplab Chatterjee; Rabi Ghosh; Arun Mukherjee; Nirmal Kumar
- Music by: Tapan Sinha, Aloke Nath De
- Release date: 17 August 1979
- Running time: 109 minutes
- Country: India
- Language: Bengali

Sabuj Dwiper Raja (Bengali pronunciation: [ʃɔbuɟ d̪bipɛr rad͡ʒa]; transl. The King of the Green Island) is a 1979 Indian Bengali-language action-adventure film written and directed by Tapan Sinha. Produced by Children's Film Society, India, the film is based on the 1976 eponymous novel by Sunil Gangopadhyay, from his Kakababu series. It stars Samit Bhanja as Kakababu, alongside Arunava Adhikari as Shontu, while Ramen Roy Chowdhury, Biplab Chatterjee, Kalyan Chatterjee, Arun Mukherjee and Asim Dutta play other supporting roles.

The first screen adaptation of a Kakababu novel, it follows Kakababu and Shontu to the Andaman Islands, in order to stop a criminal gang from stealing a powerful energy source from a meteorite located in the territory of the indigenous Jarawa tribe, who are protected by a former freedom fighter. Predominantly shot in Andaman and Nicobar, with portions in Kolkata, the film was the most expensive Bengali film at that time. Bimal Mukherjee and Subosh Roy handled its cinematography and editing respectively. Music of the film was composed by Sinha himself, along with Aloke Nath De.

Sabuj Dwiper Raja was theatrically released on 17 August 1979, to positive reviews. Emerged as a box-office success, the film attained a cult status over the years.

== Synopsis ==
A criminal gang led by notorious smuggler Panja is set to steal a secret source of energy that emanates from a meteorite that has landed in a remote area of Andaman Islands. They know that the local Jarawa tribe have no idea of its value. A patriot, Gunada Talukdar, flees from the notorious Cellular Jail during the British Raj. He reaches the island and is later chosen as King of the tribals.

Thirteen-year-old Santu joins his uncle Raja Roychoudhury alias Kakababu who is sent on behalf of the Intelligence to survey the island. The two leave Calcutta by ship for the Andaman Islands. Santu's sharp eye soon detects that the criminals are on board. Santu is instrumental in helping his uncle prevent the dastardly plot the criminals are about to carry out. Kakababu and Santu went to the alienated island of Jarawas ignoring the government restrictions.

In the meantime Panja and his henchmen were captured by Jarwas while they were trying to steal the power energy. Kakababu recognised the leader of the Jarawa, the old man as Mr. Talukdar, and after a short fight with Panja's gang they returned to the mainland with the help of police.

== Cast ==
- Samit Bhanja as Raja Roy Chowdhury / Kakababu, an ASI agent
- Arunava Adhikari as Shontu, Kakababu's nephew and assistant
- Ramen Roy Chowdhury as Verma
- Biplab Chatterjee as Kalyan Karmakar / Kalla
- Kalyan Chatterjee as Rajveer Singh
- Arun Mukherjee as Adhir Dasgupta
- Rabi Ghosh as Bhupe da
- Nirmal Kumar as Superintendent of Police
- Asim Dutta as Panja
- Debatosh Ghosh as Gunada Talukder
- Nipu Mitra as Shibcharan
- Lily Chakravarty as Shontu's Mother

== Reception ==
Although questionable on the ground of showing the Jarawa tribal-folk just as the colonial British government would specifically mark out the then resident Indian population-groups as uncivilized, belligerent sub-human 'natives', the film gained considerable popularity by synthesizing educative knowledge-bits for young filmgoers (and their parents), exotic adventure and patriotism.
