= Bratacharini =

Bratacharini ব্রতচারিণী
- Directed by: Kamal Ganguly
- Story by: Prabhabati Devi
- Starring: Uttam Kumar; Sabitri Chatterjee; Sandhya Rani
- Music by: Kamal Dasgupta; Bratacharini movie informations
- Release date: 1 January 1955
- Country: India
- Language: Bengali

Bratacharini is a 1955 Bengali film directed by Kamal Ganguly. It stars Uttam Kumar and Sabitri Chatterjee in lead roles.

== Synopsis ==
The lead character is played by Sandhya Rani. Her son Uttam Kumar marries Sabitri Chatterjee which is opposed by her.

== Cast ==
- Uttam Kumar
- Sabitri Chatterjee
- Bhanu Bandyopadhyay
- Chhabi Biswas
- Sandhya Rani
- Chhaya Devi
