= Padi Pishir Barmi Baksha =

Padi Pishir Barmi Baksha (Burmese Box of Aunt Padi) is a 1972 Bengali adventure comedy film directed by Arundhati Devi. It is based on the children's novel of the same name by Leela Majumdar. Released under the banner of Anindiya Chitra, it is Devi's most famous directorial work.

== Plot ==
Khoka is a schoolboy who goes to his uncle's house, where he learns about the tales of Padi Pishi (Aunt Padi), a formidable widow. She once went to Khuro's house to meet him, but bandits attacked her. When Khuro got to know about it, he offered her bribes from his loot so that the news would not be public. Padi Pishi then took a precious Burmese box that was hidden in Khuro's house. Before Padi's Pishi's death, she did not reveal the hiding place to anyone except her son Goja. The entire family searched for the missing box but could not recover it. A private detective also searched for the box but could not find it. The story is about how it is finally discovered.

== Cast ==
- Chhaya Devi as Padi Pishi
- Ajitesh Bandopadhyay as Bandit Uncle
- Rabi Ghosh as Private detective
- Jahor Roy
- Rudraprasad Sengupta
- Chinmoy Roy
- Nripati Chattopadhyay
- Haradhan Bandopadhyay
- Ketaki Dutta
- Nirmal Kumar
- Rajlakshmi Devi
- Mrinal Mukherjee
- Tapati Ghosh
