= Kankabatir Ghat =

1955 film

- কঙ্কাবতীর ঘাট
- Directed by: Chitta Bose
- Written by: Nripendrakrishna Chatterjee
- Story by: Mahendra Gupta
- Starring: Rishi Banerjee; Panchanan Bhattacharya; Santi Bhattacharya; Uttam Kumar; Sibkali Chatterjee; Ahindra Choudhury; Panchanan Bhattacharya; Asha Devi; Belarani Devi; Chandrabati Devi; Anubha Gupta; Anup Kumar; Shyam Laha; Preeti Majumdar; Kamal Mitra; Sandhya Rani; Santosh Singha
- Edited by: Baidyanath Chatterjee
- Music by: Kalipada Sen
- Production companies: Angel Digital Private Limited; H.N.C. Productions
- Distributed by: Chitra Paribeshak
- Release date: 12 August 1955
- Running time: 126 min.
- Country: India
- Language: Bengali

Kankabatir Ghat is a 1955 Bengali film directed by Chitta Bose and produced by Harendranath Chattopadhyay. This film was written by Nripendrakrishna Chatterjee. This film was produced by Angel Digital Private Limited and distributed by Chitra Paribeshak. The music has been composed by Kalipada Sen. This is a drama film. The film stars Panchanan Bhattacharya, Ahindra Choudhury, Chandrabati Devi, Anubha Gupta, Anup Kumar, Shyam Laha, Kamal Mitra and Uttam Kumar in the lead roles.

== Story ==
Kankabatir ghat is set on the banks of river Ganga in the village of Atashi from where Sati kangkabati, the great wife of Mr. Mukherji, an artist, committed suicide in an eternal ritual fashion to save her dying husband.people start showering her with respect. Years later, things head towards the same direction for her daughter.

== Cast ==
- Rishi Banerjee
- Panchanan Bhattacharya
- Santi Bhattacharya
- Uttam Kumar
- Sibkali Chatterjee
- Ahindra Choudhury
- Panchanan Bhattacharya
- Asha Devi
- Belarani Devi
- Chandrabati Devi
- Anubha Gupta
- Anup Kumar
- Shyam Laha
- Preeti Majumdar
- Kamal Mitra
- Sandhya Rani
- Santosh Singha

== Soundtrack ==
Kankabatir Ghat

Soundtrack album by Kalipada Sen
- Released: 1955
- Recorded: 1955

Singles from Kankabatir Ghat
- 1. "E Kul Bhenge O Kul Gore(এ কুল ভেঙে ও কুল গড়ে)" Released: 1955; 2. "Soti Kankaboti Heta(সতী কঙ্কবতী হেথা)" Released: 1955; 3. "Amar O Bhuban Hote Chai(আমারও ভুবন হতে চাই)"

All lyrics are written by Arup Bhattacharya; all music is composed by Kalipada Sen.

Track list
No.	Title	Singer	Length
1.	"E Kul Bhenge O Kul Gore(এ কুল ভেঙে ও কুল গড়ে)"	Dhananjay Bhattacharya	2:27
2.	"Soti Kankaboti Heta(সতী কঙ্কবতী হেথা)"	Dhananjay Bhattacharya	2:26
3.	"Amar O Bhuban Hote Chai(আমারও ভুবন হতে চাই)"	Gayatri Basu	3:24
