= Bilambita Loy =

- Directed by: Agragami
- Screenplay by: Agragami
- Story by: Narendranath Mitra
- Produced by: Ajoy Basu; Anil Shah
- Starring: Uttam Kumar; Supriya Choudhury; Shyamal Ghoshal; Nirmal Kumar
- Cinematography: Krishna Chakraborty
- Edited by: Kali Raha
- Music by: Nachiketa Ghosh
- Production company: Anuradha Films
- Distributed by: Chandimata Films Pvt. Ltd.
- Release date: 1 December 1970
- Running time: 118 minutes
- Country: India
- Language: Bengali

Bilambita Loy (/biˈlʌm.bɪ.toʊ lɔɪ/ transl. The Delayed Rhythm) is a 1970 Indian Bengali-language drama film co-written and directed by Agragami. Produced by Ajoy Basu and Anil Shah under the banner of Anuradha Films, the film is based on a story by Narendranath Mitra. Also inspired by the 1954 version of A Star Is Born, it stars Uttam Kumar, Supriya Devi and Shyamal Ghoshal. Nachiketa Ghosh composed the film's music. It reportedly also inspired the 1973 Hindi film Abhimaan. (Note: The 1937 version of the film is in the public domain and was based on the film What Price Hollywood? (1932), itself adapted from a story by Adela Rogers St. Johns, who loosely based her plot on the experiences of actress Colleen Moore and her husband, alcoholic producer John McCormick, and the life and death of director Tom Forman, who committed suicide following a nervous breakdown.)

== Plot ==
A promising singer falls in love in college. After some time she gets married against their families' wishes. She then begins performing to support her husband and becomes very much renowned. On the other hand, the husband of the artist fails to earn a livelihood and becomes an alcoholic. Later he the gets shelter of a nurse.

== Cast ==
- Uttam Kumar
- Supriya Choudhury
- Deepa Chatterjee
- Nirmal Kumar
- Asit Baran
- Bimal Banerjee
- Jyotsna Banerjee
- Balai Das
- Arindam Gangopadhyay
- Tarun Kumar
- Firoz Chowdhury
- Shyamal Ghoshal
- Arindam Ganguly

== Soundtrack ==
All songs were composed by Nachiketa Ghosh and penned by Pulak Bandyopadhyay.

- "Ek Baishakhe Dekha Holo Dujanay" - Aarti Mukherjee
- "Bendhona Phulomala Dore" - Manna Dey, Aarti Mukherjee
- "Anka Banka Pathe Jodi" - Aarti Mukherjee
- "Taap Chare To" - Manna Dey, Aarti Mukherjee
- "Sona Roder Gaan" - Aarti Mukherjee
