= Subrata Chatterjee =

Indian Bengali actress

- Born: 18 July 1941; Kolkata, Bengal Presidency, British India
- Died: 25 February 2004 (aged 62); Kolkata, West Bengal, India
- Occupation: Actress
- Spouse: Tarun Kumar Chatterjee (m. 1962; died 2003)
- Children: Manami "Jhimli" Banerjee (née Chatterjee)
- Relatives: Uttam Kumar (brother-in-law); Barun Chatterjee (brother in law)

Subrata Chatterjee (18 July 1940 – 25 February 2004) was an Indian actress, who is recognized for her work in Bengali cinema. Her on-screen pairings with actors such as Uttam Kumar, Soumitra Chatterjee, and Anil Chatterjee were popular.

== Career ==
Subrata Chatterjee was born on 18 July 1941 in Kolkata, India. She debuted in the Bengali movie Sosur Bari (1953) and acted in more than 200 films, mostly as a supporting actress.

== Selected filmography ==
1. Sei To Abar Kachhe Ele (1999)
2. Bhalobasha-o-Andhakar 1992
3. Bourani 1991
4. Agantuk 1991
5. Mahapith Tarapith 1989
6. Aloy Phera 1985
7. Lalita 1984
8. Lal Golap 1984
9. Bishabriksha 1984
10. Durer Nadi 1982
11. Durga Durgati Nashini 1981
12. Upalabdhi 1981
13. Abhi 1980
14. Matribhakta Ramprasad 1980
15. Tusi 1978
16. Dak Diye Jai 1978
17. Behula Lakhinder 1977
18. Praner Thakur Ramkrishna 1977
19. Chander Kachhakachhi 1976
20. Ajasra Dhanyabad 1976
21. Aguner Phulki 1976
22. Agniswar 1975
23. Mon Jare Chai 1975
24. Duranta Jay 1973
25. Nishi Kanya 1973
26. Sonar Khancha 1973
27. Stree (1972)
28. Biraj Bou 1972
29. Mem Sahib 1972
30. Chitti 1972
31. Mahabiplabi Aurobindo 1971
32. Sansar 1971
33. Megh Kalo 1970
34. Maa-o-Meye 1969
35. Pita Putra 1969
36. Kokhono Megh 1968
37. Adwitiya 1968
38. Jiban Mrityu 1967
39. Chidiakhana 1967
40. Dolgobinder Karcha 1966
41. Griha Sandhaney 1966
42. Natun Tirtha 1964
43. Saat Pake Bandha 1963
44. Shesh Prahar 1963
45. Personal Assistant 1959
46. Pushpadhanu 1959
47. Sosur Bari 1953

== Awards ==
- Won, Bengal Film Journalists' Association – Best Supporting Actor Award for Chiriakhana (1967)
