= Uphaar =

- Original poster
- Directed by: Sudhendu Roy
- Based on: 'Samapti', a short story by Rabindranath Tagore
- Produced by: Tarachand Barjatya
- Starring: Jaya Bhaduri; Kamini Kaushal
- Music by: Laxmikant Pyarelal
- Release date: 10 December 1971
- Country: India
- Language: Hindi

Uphaar is a 1971 Hindi film. Produced by Tarachand Barjatya for Rajshri Productions, the film stars Jaya Bhaduri, Swarup Dutta and Kamini Kaushal. The music is by Laxmikant Pyarelal. This film is based on the 1893 short story "Samapti" (The End) by Rabindranath Tagore. The film was selected as the Indian entry for the Best Foreign Language Film at the 45th Academy Awards, but it was not nominated. Following years this movie dubbed in various south Indian languages including successful in Malayalam as Upaharam in 1972. "Samapti" was earlier made into a Bengali movie by Satyajit Ray and is a part of his trio of short films released as "Teen Kanya".

== Plot ==
Anoop studies law in Calcutta, while his widowed mom lives in a small town in West Bengal. He has a sister, Sudha, who is married to Anil and lives in Calcutta. Since Anoop is of marriageable age, his mom has selected a prospective bride for him in her neighbourhood. The girl's name is Vidya. When Anoop returns home, his mother asks him for his approval, but he says he wants to see the girl first. He goes to see Vidya, and also gets to meet another village belle by the name of Minoo, the daughter of Sharda and Ramchandra. He returns home, tells his mom that he cannot marry Vidya, and will marry only Minoo. His mother reluctantly agrees, and the marriage takes place. It is then that they find out that Minoo has no household skills. Neither is she educated, nor mature enough to understand her relationship with Anoop. Her only interests appear to be stealing mangoes and other fruit and playing with children much younger than her. Anoop's mom is quite exasperated with Minoo and is compelled to keep the new bride under lock and key. When the time comes for Anoop to return to Calcutta, he asks Minoo to come with him, but she refuses.

His mother cannot handle Minoo's childishness and refuses to let her stay with her. Anoop accordingly leaves Minoo with her mom, Sharda. Once Anoop leaves her and heads back to Calcutta, Minoo starts realising she misses him. All her earlier activities of fooling around and playing with the village kids loses their charm and, in her loneliness, she realises her love for Anoop. She then tells her mom that she wants to go back to Anoop's house, reconcile with her mother-in-law and live with her. Minoo goes back, a changed person. Anoop's mom welcomes her daughter-in-law. Minoo excels in her household duties. But Anoop does not visit even for his holidays. Minoo realises that, when she had refused to accompany him to Calcutta, Anoop's ego was bruised. He had promised that he would come only when she wrote to him to come back. So she writes a letter to Anoop telling him to come home. But she does not have his address, so Anoop never gets the letter. In the meantime, Anoop's mom, realizing that Minoo is truly missing her husband, suggests a trip to Calcutta to visit him. It is in Anoop's sister's house in Calcutta that the love-lorn couple finally comes together.

== Cast ==
- Swarup Dutta as Anoop (as Swaroop Dutt)
- Jaya Bhaduri as Minoo a.k.a. Mrinmayee
- Suresh Chatwal as Anil, Sudha's husband
- Nandita Thakur as Sudha
- Nana Palsikar as Ramchandra
- Ratnamala as Sharda
- Leela Mishra as Kaki
- Kamini Kaushal as Anoop's mother
- Yunus Pervez as Banwari
- Shail Chaturvedi as Shankarlal

== Songs ==
1. "Mai Ek Raaja Hu, Tu Ek Rani Hai' - Mohammed Rafi
2. "Chhal Chhal Bahati, Maajhi Nayyaa Dhundhe Kinaaraa" - Mukesh
3. "Sunee Re Nagariya, Sunee Re Sejariya" - Lata Mangeshkar
4. "Haathon Men Mehandi, Bol Re Mere Gudde Tujhe Guddi Kubul" - Lata Mangeshkar

== See also ==
- List of submissions to the 45th Academy Awards for Best Foreign Language Film
- List of Indian submissions for the Academy Award for Best Foreign Language Film
