= Postmaster (film) =

2016 Indian film

- Written by: Srijon Bardhan
- Story by: Srijon Bardhan; Rabindranath Tagore
- Produced by: Pradip Kumar Bardhan
- Cinematography: Rana Dasgupta
- Edited by: Ujjal Nandi
- Music by: Srijon Bardhan
- Release date: 2016
- Running time: 146 minutes
- Country: India
- Language: Bengali

Postmaster is a 2016 Bengali film based on Rabindranath Tagore's 1891 short story of the same name, directed and written by Srijon Bardhan, produced by Sri Media. The motion picture had its premiere on 7 December 2015 at the 4th Delhi International Film Festival, later being released commercially on 24 June 2016 at Star Theatres, Kolkata, West Bengal, India. The film was also selected at the 14th Chennai International Film Festival, in 2017.

== Cast ==
- Ishan Mazumdar
- Pujarini Ghosh
- Biswajit Chakraborty
- Tulika Basu
- Mousumi Saha
- Kalyan Chatterjee
- Bodhiswatya Mazumdar
- Biplab Chatterjee
- Rohan Bhattacharya

== Plot ==
Young spirited Nanda Sen leaves his city home of old Calcutta and luxury of urban life to join as the village Postmaster of Plassey where his life was comforted with the service and company of orphan low-caste housemaid Ratna and his only friend there- school teacher Rabibabu. Ratna's charm appealed to him and Nanda married her against society and family. Succumbed to his father's last wish to marry a suitable match, Nanda landed in a crisis and escaped his desired family life. Nanda couldn't overcome this sin and finds solace in the next life.

== Music ==
Record Label: Times Music.

Title	Singer(s)	Composition	Lyrics	Music director
"O Rongila Nayia"	Dibakar Das Baul	Folk	Folk	Srijon Bardhan
"Aamay Jodi Mon Debe"	Anweshaa Datta Gupta, Samantak Sinha	Srijon Bardhan	Rabindranath Tagore	Srijon Bardhan
"Tomaye Gaan Sonabo"	Anweshaa Datta Gupta	Rabindranath Tagore	Rabindranath Tagore	Srijon Bardhan
"Aye Bodhu Aye"	Anweshaa Datta Gupta, Trisha Parui, Debalina Bhattacharya, Sangita Chakraborty	Srijon Bardhan	Srijon Bardhan	Srijon Bardhan
"Dui Hridoyer Nodi"	Trisha Parui, Joy Bhattacharya	Rabindranath Tagore	Rabindranath Tagore	Srijon Bardhan
"Kheyar Tori"	Malabika Brahma, Srijon Bardhan	Srijon Bardhan	Srijon Bardhan	Srijon Bardhan
"Pakhi Kokhun Urey Jaye"	Srijon Bardhan	Lalon Fakir	Lalon Fakir	Srijon Bardhan
