= Sabitri Chatterjee =

Indian actress

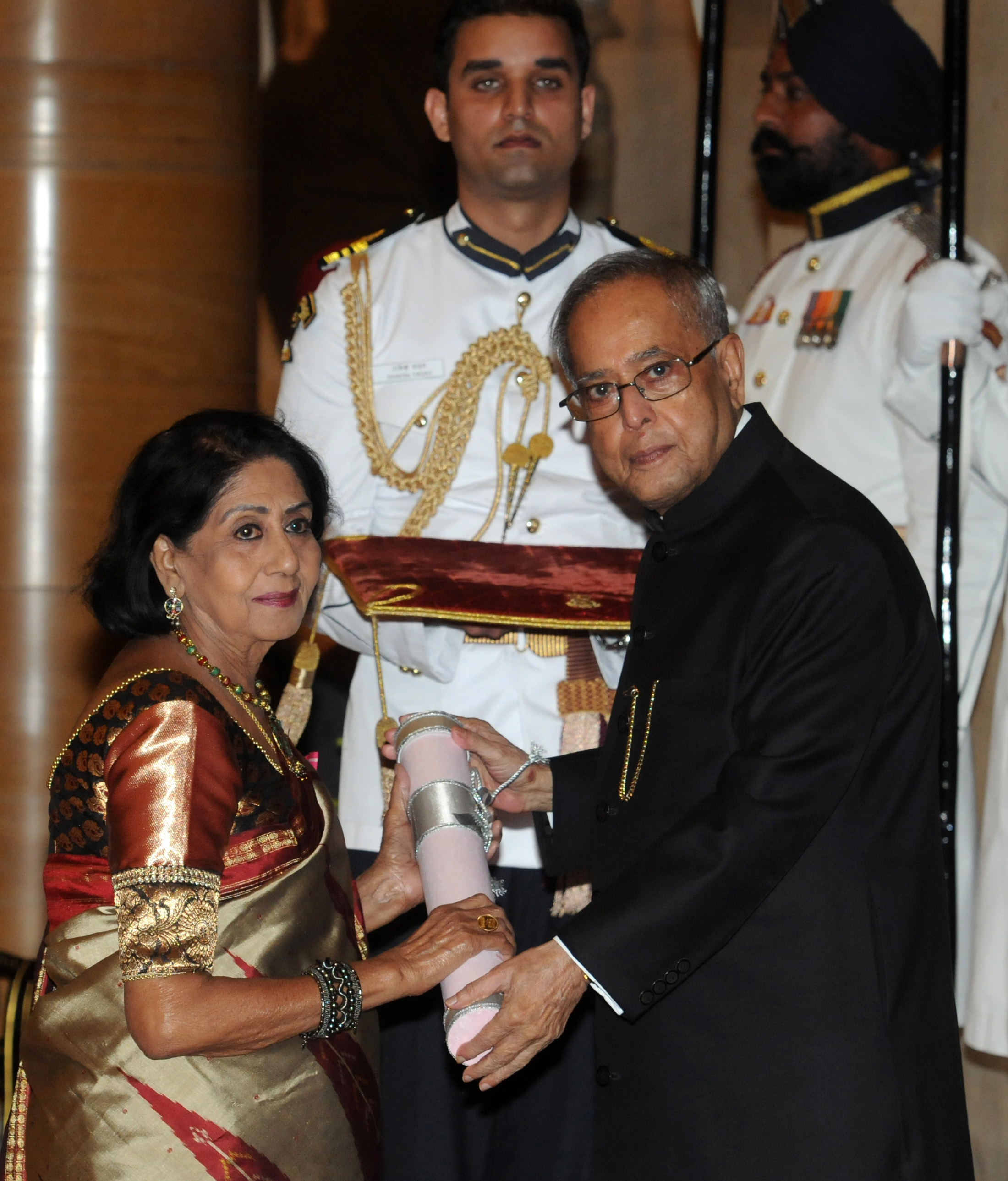
- Chatterjee receiving the Padma Shri Award from Indian president Pranab Mukherjee, 2014
- Born: 21 February 1937 (age 89); Comilla, Bengal Province, British India (now in Bangladesh)
- Occupation: Actress
- Years active: 1947–present
- Father: Sashadhar Chatterjee
- Awards: BFJA Awards; Sangeet Natak Akademi Award; Banga Bibhushan; Padma Shri

Sabitri Chatterjee (born 21 February 1937) is an Indian actress who is known for her work in Bengali theatre and cinema. Her career spans more than seventy years. She twice won the BFJA Awards. In 1999, she was conferred with Sangeet Natak Akademi Award for acting in Bengali theatre. In 2013, she was awarded by the Government of West Bengal its highest civilian award; the Banga Bibhushan.

In 2014, Government of India conferred upon her its fourth-highest civilian award the Padma Shri.

She was born in Comilla, in British India (now in Bangladesh). During the partition of Bengal, she was sent to the safety of an older, married sister's house in Kolkata located at Tollygunge. During her adolescence, she was noticed by Bhanu Banerjee who took her to Uttar Sarathi group theatre for a role in their play Natun Ihudi. Later she emerged as a prominent thespian personality for the title role in the play Shyamali which was staged at Star Theatre. She made her big screen debut in Uttam Kumar starrer Sahajatri (1951) directed by Agradoot and appeared as her first female lead in Sudhir Mukherjee's comedy film Pasher Bari (1952) which was a major success at box office. She is remembered for her roles in films such as Raat Bhor (1955), Upahar (1955), Abhayer Biye (1957), Nupur (1958), Gali Theke Rajpath (1959), Marutirtha Hinglaj (1959), Kuhak (1960), Badhu (1962), Bhranti Bilas (1963), Uttarayan (1963), Jaya (1965), Kal Tumi Aleya (1966), Nishipadma (1970), Dhanyi Meye (1971) and Malyadan (1971) to name a few. Soumitra Chatterjee described her as the finest actor he has worked with.

== Early life and background ==
Sabitri was born on 21 February 1937 in a small town of Kamalapur in Comilla District of present-day Bangladesh and is youngest among ten sisters. Her father Sashadhar Chatterjee, who belonged to a famous Kulin Rarhi Brahmin family from a Kulin Brahmin village called Kanaksar in Bikrampur, worked as a station master in Indian Railways. During the partition of Bengal, young Sabitri was sent to the safety of an older, married sister's house in Kolkata located at Tollygunge – the hub of filmmaking in Kolkata. Being brought up in Tollygunge she often saw filmstars of that time.

== Career ==
=== Film career ===
When Sabitri Chatterjee was in class ten, she was noticed by veteran actor Bhanu Banerjee who picked her up for a role in Natun Ihudi, a play of Uttar Sarathi group theatre on the refugees from East Pakistan. The play was being directed by Kanu Banerjee – the actor who would later perform as Harihar Roy, in Satyajit Ray's Pather Panchali and Aparajito. Sabitri also acted the film version of the play which was released in 1953. She made her big screen debut in Uttam Kumar starrer Sahajatri (1951) directed by Agradoot and appeared as her first female lead in Sudhir Mukherjee's comedy film Pasher Bari (1952) which was a major success at box office.

Sabitri Chatterjee's next film assignment was Subhada (1952) – a film based on a novel by Sarat Chandra Chattopadhyay and directed by Niren Lahiri along with Chhabi Biswas and Pahari Sanyal. In this film, she played the role of an unfortunate girl named Lalana. In the same year, she appeared in the Uttam Kumar starrer family drama Basu Poribar (1952), directed by Nirmal Dey, which had Supriya Devi in the role of Uttam Kumar's sister. Sabitri and Uttam Kumar had been friends since 1951, Uttam Kumar offered her to act in a theatrical production to be produced by his group Krishti O Srishti. The Uttam-Sabitri combination became a favourite of the Bengali cine-goers and their friendship withstood strong but false rumours of marriage.

They would be responsible for a series of films, including Lakh Taka (1953), Kalyani (1954), Anupama (1954), Raikamal (1955), Nabojanma (1956), Punar Milan (1957), Marutirtha Hinglaj (1959), Raja-Saja (1960), Dui Bhai (1961), Bhranti Bilas (1963), Momer Alo (1964) and Nishipadma (1970). They also had major roles in Mrinal Sen's first feature film Raat Bhore (1955) and Tapan Sinha's second effort Upahaar (1955). Bhranti Bilas, Mouchak and Dhanyi Meye rank high among the Bengali comedy films.

In the early eighties, Sabitri did not appear on screen as before. However, in the late 1980s, she came back with films such as Mamoni, Anandalok and Haar-Jeet.

=== TV career ===
Sabitri Chatterjee continues to act in commercial Bengali cinemas and television till date. She is one of the stars of the mega soap opera Sonar Horin, that has run more than 1000 episodes, which was aired on ETV Bangla. She has acted as Muktokeshi in the serial Subarnalata. (The title role was played by the National Film Award-winning Ananya Chatterjee), an adaptation of Ashapurna Devi's novel, which was aired on Zee Bangla and as Sona thamma in Jol Nupur which was aired on Star Jalsha.

She is acted as a senior matriarch of a family in the TV serial Kusum dola, which is aired in STAR Jalsha. She has played the master chef in Joto Hashi Toto Ranna, which is a fiction cum reality cookery show, where kitchen skills are weaved around a fictional plot revolving around a certain Gupta family. She played a minor role in 2012 Star Jalsha serial Tapur Tupur, and also played the role of a yesteryear actress in Chokher Tara Tui. This TV serial is also aired in Star Jalsha. She acted in an Indian Bengali show named Andarmahal, which aired on the popular Bengali entertainment channel Zee Bangla.

== Awards ==
- The Bengal Film Journalists' Association (BFJA) Award for Best Actress in Supporting Role in 1967 for "Kal Tumi Aleya"
- BFJA Award-Best Actress in Supporting Role in 1972 for "Malyadan"
- Sangeet Natak Akademi Award for Acting in Bengali theatre in 1999.
- Kalakar Awards- Lifetime Achievement Award in 2003.
- D.Lit degree from Kalyani University in 2012
- Banga Bibhushan Award in 2013 for her contribution to Indian Cinema.
- Padma Shri Award in 2014 for contributions in Film arts.

== Filmography ==
Title	Year	Role	Ref.
1951	Sahajatri		
1952	Aladin O Ascharya Pradeep		
1952	Basu Paribar		
1952	Mahishasur Badh		
1952	Pasher Bari		
1952	Sabitri Satyaban		
1952	Subhada	Lalana	
1953	Adrishya Manush		
1953	Blind Lane		
1953	Kajari		
1953	Keranir Jiban		
1953	Lakh Taka		
1953	Natun Yahudi		
1953	Rami Chandidas		
1953	Sitar Patal Prabesh		
1953	Swashurbari		
1954	Annapurnar Mandir		
1954	Atom Bomb		
1954	Bhanga Gora		
1954	Champadangar Bou	Kadambini	
1954	Ladies Seat		
1954	Kalyani		
1954	Moyla Kagaj		
1955	Anupama		
1955	Ardhangini		
1955	Bidhilipi	Sandhya	
1955	Bratacharini		
1955	Drishti		
1955	Dui Bon		
1955	Godhuli		
1955	Paresh		
1955	Pather Sheshe		
1955	Raikamal	Raikamal	
1955	Raat Bhor		
1955	Upahar	Krishna	
1956	Daner Maryada	Usha	
1956	Gobindadas		
1956	Maa		
1956	Mamlar Phal		
1956	Nabajanma		
1956	Paradhin		
1956	Sabdhan		
1956	Sadhana		
1956	Sinthir Sindur		
1957	Abhishek		
1957	Abhoyer Biye		
1957	Baksiddha		
1957	Basantabahar		
1957	Chhayapath		
1957	Ektara		
1957	Kancha Mithe		
1957	Madhabir Janya		
1957	Natun Prabhat		
1957	Punarmilan		
1957	Shesh Parichoy		
1957	Tasher Ghar		
1958	Dakharkara		
1958	Daktarbabu		
1958	Marmabani		
1958	Meghamallar		
1958	Nupur		
1959	Abak Prithibi		
1959	Gali Theke Rajpath		
1959	Marutirtha Hinglaj		
1959	Noukabilas		
1959	Rater Andhakare		
1959	Sashibabur Sangsar		
1960	Gariber Meye		
1960	Haat Baralei Bandhu		
1960	Kshudha		
1960	Kuhak		
1960	Raja Saja		
1961	Dui Bhai		
1962	Badhu		
1962	Naba Diganta		
1963	Akashpradip		
1963	Bhrantibilas		
1963	Shes Anko	Lata Bose	
1963	Uttarayan		
1964	Momer Alo	Deepa	
1964	Pratinidhi		
1965	Antaral		
1965	Dinanter Alo		
1965	Gulmohar		
1965	Jaya	Jaya	
1966	Joradighir Chowdhury Paribar		
1966	Kal Tumi Aleya	Sonaboudi	
1966	Sushanta Sha		
1967	Grihadaha	Mrinal	
1968	Baluchari		
1968	Pathey Holo Dekha		
1970	Aleyar Alo		
1970	Nishi Padma	Padma	
1970	Kalankita Nayak		
1970	Manjari Opera	Manjari Devi	
1970	Muktisnan		
1971	Dhanyee Meye		
1971	Malyadaan	Patal	
1971	Pratham Pratishruti		
1972	Sesh Parba		
1974	Mouchak		
1975	Phool Sajya		
1976	Sei Chokh		
1977	Mantramugdha		
1978	Aguner Phulki		
1979	Brajabuli		
1979	Heerey Manik		
1980	Rajnandini		
1981	Pratishodh		
1986	Mamoni		
1988	Anandalok		
1992	Bahadur		
2000	Har Jeet		
2006	Podokkhep	Shobita	
2006	Tapasya		
2012	Hemlock Society		
2014	Highway		
2016	Thammar Boyfriend	Nandini Mitra	
2016	Praktan		
2018	Maati		
2022	Aporajeyo		
2023	Pradhan		
2025	Aamar Boss		

== Television ==
Year	Serial	Role	Channel
2006	Sonar Horin		ETV Bangla
2007–2008	Sanai	Mrs. Choudhury	Akash Bangla
2010–2012	Subarnalata	Muktakeshi	Zee Bangla
2011–2013	Tapur Tupur		Star Jalsha
2011–2015	Ishti Kutum		Star Jalsha
2013–2015	Jol Nupur	Kamalini Krishnendushekhar Basumallick	Star Jalsha
2014–2016	Chokher Tara Tui		Star Jalsha
2016–2017	Ei Chheleta Bhelbheleta	Shaluk's Maternal Grandmother	Zee Bangla
2016–2018	Kusum Dola	Savitri Chatterjee	Star Jalsha
2017–2018	Andarmahal	Swatilekha Dutta	Zee Bangla
2017–2018	Sanyashi Raja	Rashmani Basu	Star Jalsha
2019–2020	Mayurpankhi	Kamalini Sen	Star Jalsha
2019–2022	Mohor	Saraswati Bose	Star Jalsha
2021–2022	Dhulokona	Ratulmani Ganguly	Star Jalsha
2023	Balijhor	Srot's Grandmother	Star Jalsha
2025–2026	Chirosokha		Star Jalsha
