= List of Indian Bengali films of the 1970s =

A list of films produced by the Tollywood (Bengali language film industry) based in Kolkata in the 1970s.

== 1970 ==
Title	Director	Cast	Genre	Notes/Music
Aleyer Alo	Mangal Chakravarty	Bhanu Bannerjee, Kali Bannerjee, Savitri Chatterjee		
Aranyer Din Ratri	Satyajit Ray	Soumitra Chatterjee	Drama	Nominated for Golden Bear
Baksa Badal	Nityananda Datta	Soumitra Chatterjee, Aparna Sen		
Bilambita Loy	Agragami, Narendranath Mitra	Uttam Kumar, Supriya Choudhury, Deepa Chatterjee		
Dibratrir Kabya	Bhimal Bhowmik, Narayan Chakraborty	Kanu Bannerjee, Anjana Bhowmik, Basanta Choudhury		
Duti Mon	Piyush Bose	Robin Bannerjee, Asit Baran, Khudiram Bhattacharya		
Eai Korechho Bhalo	Ajit Bandopadhyay	Anup Kumar, June Banerjee, Samarjeet, Lily Chakravarty		
Kalankita Nayak	Salil Dutta	Uttam Kumar, Sabitri Chatterjee, Aparna Sen		
Mahakabi Krittibas	Ashok Chatterjee	Ashim Kumar, Lily Chakravorty, Padmadevi	Drama	
Manjari Opera	Agradoot	Ajoy Bannerjee, Satya Bannerjee, Jyotsna Biswas		
Nishi Padma	Arabinda Mukhopadhyay	Uttam Kumar, Sabitri Chatterjee	Drama	Two National Film Awards for Playback Singing
Rajkumari	Salil Sen	Bhanu Bannerjee, Asit Baran, Tarun Kumar Chatterjee		
Rupasi	Ajit Ganguly	Sandhya Roy, Samit Bhanja, Kali Bannerjee		
Sagina Mahato	Tapan Sinha	Dilip Kumar		Entered into the 7th Moscow International Film Festival
Samantaral	Gurudas Bagchi	Madhavi Mukherjee, Anil Chatterjee, Lolita Chatterjee		

== 1971 ==
Title	Director	Cast	Genre	Notes
Alo Amar Alo	Pinaki Bhushan Mukherjee	Suchitra Sen, Uttam Kumar, Bikash Roy		
Aparna	Salil Sen	Soumitra Chatterjee, Tanuja, Shubhendru Chattopadhyay	Drama	
Bhanu Goenda Jahar Assistant	Purnendu Roy Chowdhury	Bhanu Bannerjee, Jahor Roy, Subhendu Chatterjee	Romance, Comedy	
Chhadmabeshi	Agradoot	Uttam Kumar, Madhabi Mukherjee, Ajoy Bannerjee	Comedy	
Dhanyee Meye	Arabinda Mukhopadhyay	Uttam Kumar, Sabitri Chatterjee	Romance, Comedy	
Ekhoni	Tapan Sinha	Aparna Sen, Moushumi Chatterjee, Chinmoy Roy	Drama	
Interview	Mrinal Sen	Ranjit Mallick, Karuna Banerjee	Parallel Drama	
Janani	Ajit Ganguly	Sulochana Chatterjee, Kali Banerjee, Satya Banerjee	Drama	
Jiban Jiggasa	Piyush Bose	Mantu Bannerjee, Ashim Chakraborty, Tarun Kumar Chatterjee		
Joyjayanti	Sunil Basu Mallick	Biren Chatterjee, Tarun Kumar Chatterjee, Chandrabati Devi		
Kuheli	Tarun Majumdar	Biswajit Chatterjee, Chhaya Devi, Utpal Dutt	Suspense	
Mahabiplabi Aurobindo	Deepak Gupta	Dilip Roy, Subrata Chatterjee, Ajitesh Bandopadhyay	Drama	
Malyadan	Ajoy Kar	Soumitra Chatterjee, Sabitri Chatterjee	Drama	
Nabaraag	Bijoy Bose	Uttam Kumar, Suchitra Sen, Bijon Bhattacharya		
Nimantran	Tarun Majumdar	Sandhya Roy, Anup Kumar	Drama	
Prathan Basanta	Nirmal Mitra	Madhabi Mukherjee, Anil Chatterjee, Lily Chakravarty	Romance, Drama	
Pratidwandi	Satyajit Ray	Dhritiman Chatterjee	Drama	
Sansar	Salil Sen	Soumitra Chatterjee, Sabitri Chatterjee, Nandini Maliya	Drama	
Seemabaddha	Satyajit Ray	Sharmila Tagore, Barun Chanda	Social Drama	

== 1972 ==
Title	Director	Cast	Genre	Notes
Andha Atit	Hiren Nag	Uttam Kumar, Supriya Devi, Kali Banerjee	Thriller, Drama	
Anindita	Hemanta Mukherjee	Subhendu Chatterjee, Moushumi Chatterjee, Basu Bandyopadhyay		
Biraj Bau	Manu Sen	Uttam Kumar, Madhabi Mukherjee, Bikash Roy	Drama	
Calcutta 71	Mrinal Sen	Utpal Dutt, Debraj Roy, Satya Bandyopadhyay	Parallel Drama	
Chhinapatra	Tarun Majumdar	Uttam Kumar, Supriya Choudhury, Madhavi Mukherjee		
Har Mani Har	Salil Sen	Samita Biswas, Lolita Chatterjee, Tarun Kumar Chatterjee		
Jaban	Palash Banerjee	Samit Bhanja, Radha Saluja	Drama	
Jiban Saikate	Swadesh Sarkar	Soumitra Chatterjee, Aparna Sen, Dilip Roy		
Mem Saheb	Pinaki Mukherjee	Uttam Kumar, Gita Dey, Sumitra Mukherjee		
Padi Pishir Barmi Baksha	Arundhati Devi	Chhaya Devi, Ajitesh Bandopadhyay, Rabi Ghosh	Adventure, Comedy	
Parivartan	D.S. Sultania	Utpal Dutt, Ranjit Mallick, Heena Kausar		
Picnic	Inder Sen	Archana Gupta, Dhritiman Chatterjee, Ranjit Mallick		
Ranur Pratham Bhag	Nabyendu Chatterjee	Ajitesh Bandopadhyay, Gita Dey	Drama	
Stree	Salil Dutta	Uttam Kumar, Soumitra Chatterjee	Drama	
Strir Patra	Purnendu Pattrea	Madhabi Mukherjee, Santosh Dutta	Social Drama	

== 1973 ==
Title	Director	Cast	Genre	Notes
Aabirey Rangano	Amal Dutta	Suchandra, Anil Mukherjee, Salil Ghosh	Drama	
Achena Atithi	Sukhen Das, Gyanesh Mukherjee	Rabi Ghosh, Samit Bhanja, Sukhen Das	Drama	
Ali Baba	Rohit Mohra	Haradhan Bandopadhyay, Sekhar Chattopadhyay, Aparna Sen	Animated Drama	
Ami Sirajer Begam	Sushil Mukhopadhyay	Biswajit Chatterjee, Sandhya Roy	Historical Drama	
Ashani Sanket	Satyajit Ray	Soumitra Chatterjee, Bobita	Drama	
Basanta Bilap	Dinen Gupta	Soumitra Chatterjee, Aparna Sen, Rabi Ghosh	Romance, Comedy	
Bindur Chhele	Gurudas Bagchi	Madhavi Mukherjee, Sandhyarani, Bikash Roy		
Bon Palashir Padabali	Uttam Kumar	Uttam Kumar, Supriya Devi, Madhabi Mukherjee	Romance, Drama	
Chithi	Nabyendu Chatterjee	Sandhya Roy, Samit Bhanja, Ajitesh Bannerjee		
Dholer Raja Khirode Natta	Buddhadev Dasgupta		Documentary	
Dui Bon	Sachin Adhikari	Bidya, Bijay Chakraborty, Master Goutam		
Jiban Rahasya	Salil Roy	Pran Sikand, Madhavi Mukherjee, Subhendu Chatterjee		
Kayahiner Kahini	Uttam Kumar, Madhabi Mukherjee			
Marjina Abdulla		Gita Dey, Utpal Dutt, Santosh Dutta		
Nani Gopaler Biye	Sudhir Mukherjee	Chinmoy Roy, Juin Bannerjee, Ananda Mukherjee		
Natun Diner Alo	Ajit Ganguly	Soumitra Chatterjee, Sabitri Chatterjee, Hasu Bandyopadhyay		
Padatik	Mrinal Sen	Dhritiman Chatterjee, Simi Garewal	Drama	
Raater Rajinigandha	Ajit Ganguly	Uttam Kumar, Aparna Sen, Adinath Bannerjee		
Raudro Chhaya	Sachin Adhikari	Uttam Kumar, Anjana Bhowmik, Bhanu Bannerjee		
Sabuj Dwiper Raja	Tapan Sinha	Samit Bhanja, Arunava Adhikari, Kalyan Chatterjee		
Shriman Prithviraj	Tarun Majumdar	Ayan Banerjee, Mahua Roychoudhury	Romance, Comedy	
Sonar Khancha	Agradoot	Haradhan Bannerjee, Nirmal Kumar Chakraborty, Subrata Chatterjee		
Titash Ekti Nadir Naam	Ritwik Ghatak	Prabir Mitra, Rosy Samad	Drama	

== 1974 ==
Title	Director	Cast	Genre	Notes
Alor Thikana	Bijoy Bose	Anil Chatterjee, Chhayadevi, Utpal Dutt		
Asati	Salil Dutta	Soumitra Chatterjee, Aparna Sen, Utpal Dutt		
Bikaley Bhorer Phool	Pijush Bose	Uttam Kumar, Sumitra Mukherjee, Utpal Dutt, Rabi Ghosh	Drama	
Chhera Tamsuk	Purnendu Pattrea	Ranjit Mallick, Sumitra Mukherjee	Drama	
Chorus	Mrinal Sen	Utpal Dutt, Asit Banerjee, Sekhar Chatterjee		
Debi Chowdhurani	Dinen Gupta	Haradhan Bannerjee, Kali Bannerjee, Premangshu Bose		
Fuleswari	Tarun Majumdar	Sandhya Roy, Samit Bhanja, Utpal Dutt	Romance, Drama	
Jadi Jantem	Tarun Majumdar	Soumitra Chatterjee, Supriya Devi	Drama	
Jadu Bansha	Partha Pratim Chowdhury	Uttam Kumar, Sharmila Tagore, Aparna Sen		
Jiban Kahini	Rajen Tarafdar	Sandhya Roy, Bikash Roy, Anup Kumar	Drama	
Jukti Takko Aar Gappo	Ritwik Ghatak	Ritwik Ghatak, Tripti Mitra	Drama	
Mouchak	Arabinda Mukhopadhyay	Uttam Kumar, Sabitri Chatterjee, Ranjit Mallick	Romance, Comedy	
Raktatilak	Biswajeet Chatterjee	Biswajit Chatterjee, Prosenjit Chatterjee, Tarun Kumar Chatterjee		
Rodan Bhara Basanta	Sushil Mukherjee	Uttam Kumar, Basabi Nandi, Utpal Dutt		
Sangini	Dinen Gupta	Bhanu Bannerjee, Kali Bannerjee, Samita Biswas		
Shajarur Kanta	Manju Dey	Shyamal Ghosal, Shailen Mukherjee	Detective thriller	
Sonar Kella	Satyajit Ray	Soumitra Chatterjee, Santosh Dutta	Mystery	
Thagini	Tarun Majumdar	Utpal Dutt, Sandhya Roy	Drama	

== 1975 ==
Title	Director	Cast	Genre	Notes
Agnishwar	Arabinda Mukhopadhyay	Uttam Kumar, Madhabi Mukherjee, Tarun Kumar	Drama	
Amanush	Shakti Samanta	Uttam Kumar, Sharmila Tagore, Prema Narayan		
Ami Shey O Sakha	Mangal Chakravorty	Uttam Kumar, Anil Chatterjee, Kaberi Bose	Drama	
Bagh Bondi Khela	Piyush Bose	Uttam Kumar, Supriya Devi	Thriller, drama	
Chhutir Pande	Salil Sen	Soumitra Chatterjee, Aparna Sen, Utpal Dutt		
Kavi	Debaki Kumar Bose	Nripati Chattopadhyay, Tulsi Chakraborty, Nitish Mukhopadhyay	Drama	
Nagar Darpane	Tarun Majumdar	Partha Pratim Choudhury, Ashutosh Mukherjee, Yatrik		
Nishi Mrigaya	Dinen Gupta	Bhanu Bannerjee, Soumitra Chatterjee, Vasant Choudhury		
Palanka	Rajen Tarafdar	Utpal Dutt, Sandhya Roy, Anwar Hossain	Historical drama	
Priyo Bandhabi	Hiren Nag	Tarun Kumar Chatterjee, Bhanu Bannerjee, Suchitra Sen	Drama	
Rag Anurag	Dinen Gupta	Aparna Sen, Ranjit Mallick, Anup Kumar		
Sanyasi Raja	Piyush Bose	Uttam Kumar, Supriya Choudhury	Drama	
Swayansiddha	Sushil Mukherjee	Ranjit Mallick, Mithu Mukherjee, Utpal Dutt	Drama	

== 1976 ==
Title	Director	Cast	Genre	Notes
Ajasra Dhanyabad	Arabinda Mukhopadhyay	Aparna Sen, Ranjit Mallick, Anil Chatterjee		
Anandamela	Mangal Chakravarty	Utpal Dutt, Rabi Ghosh, Anup Kumar		
Banhishikha	Piyush Bose	Uttam Kumar, Ranjit Mallick, Supriya Devi and Olivia Gomez	Science fiction action thriller	
Bilwamangal	Gobinda Roy	Samit Bhanja, Seema Das, Sumita Das		
Chander Kachakanchi	Dilip Mukherjee	Uttam Kumar, Satya Bannerjee, Tarun Kumar Chatterjee		
Dampati	Anil Ghosh	Ranjit Mallick, Mahua Roychoudhury, Mala Sinha, Utpal Dutt, Rabi Ghosh	Drama	
Datta	Ajoy Kar	Soumitra Chatterjee, Suchitra Sen, Samit Bhanja	Romance, Drama	
Hangsharaj	Ajit Ganguly	Beauty Banerjee, Kali Bannerjee, Khudiram Bhattacharya		
Harmonium	Tapan Sinha	Arati Bhattacharya, Samit Bhanja, Santu Mukhopadhyay		
Hotel Snow Fox	Tarun Majumdar	Partha Pratim Chowdhury, Koutilya Gupta, Tarun Majumdar		
Jana Aranya	Satyajit Ray	Pradip Mukherjee, Dipankar De, Utpal Dutt	Drama	
Jibon Marur Prante	Sadhan Chowdhury	Master Babusona, Samit Bhanja, Sibani Bose		
Jora Dighir Chowdhury	Ajit Lahiri	Soumitra Chatterjee, Madhabi Mukherjee, Sabitri Chatterjee	Drama	
Mohunbaganer Meye	Manu Sen	Rajasree Bose, Dipankar De, Bhanu Bannerjee		
Nidhiram Sardar	Rabi Ghosh	Uttam Kumar, Aparna Sen, Nandita Bose		
Sei Chokh	Salil Dutta	Uttam Kumar, Utpal Dutt, Sabitri Chatterjee	Drama	
Sudur Niharika	Sushil Mukherjee	Soumitra Chatterjee, Soma Dey, Debashree Roy		
Swikarokti	Gyanesh Mukherjee	Bhanu Bannerjee, Kali Bannerjee, Sabitri Chatterjee		

== 1977 ==
Title	Director	Cast	Genre	Notes
Asadharan	Salil Sen	Bhanu Bannerjee, Utpal Dutt, Uttam Kumar		
Baba Taraknath	Sunil Bannerjee, Baren Chatterjee	Sandhya Roy, Biswajit Chatterjee, Sulochana Chatterjee		
Bhola Moira	Piyush Ganguly	Uttam Kumar, Supriya Choudhury, Satya Bannerjee		
Din Amader	Agradoot	Ajoy Bannerjee, Rita Bhaduri, Biplab Chatterjee		
Ek Je Chhilo Desh	Tapan Sinha	Sumitra Mukherjee, Dipankar De, Chhaya Devi		
Hate Raila Tin	Sarit Bannerjee	Bimal Bannerjee, Satindra Bhattacharya, Biren Chatterjee		
Jaal Sannyasi	Salil Sen	Uttam Kumar, Kamal Mitra, Arati Bhattacharya		
Kabita	Bharat Shamsher	Mala Sinha, Ranjit Mallick, Kamal Haasan		
Kal Tumi Aleya	Sachin Mukherjee	Uttam Kumar, Supriya Devi, Sabitri Chatterjee, Rabi Ghosh	Romance	
Kitaab	Gulzar	Bhushan Banmali, Samaresh Basu, Gulzar		
Mantramugda	Arabinda Mukhopadhyay	Sabitri Chatterjee, Soumitra Chatterjee, Sumitra Mukherjee		
Nagarik	Ritwik Ghatak	Satindra Bhattacharya, Kali Banerjee, Sova Sen	Parallel	completed in 1952
Nanaranger Dinguli	Kanak Mukhopadhyay	Ajoy Bannerjee, Satindra Bhattacharya, Mintu Chakraborty		
Pratishruti	Pinaki Bhushan Mukherjee	Ranjit Mallick, Utpal Dutt, Anup Kumar		
Rajbansha	Piyush Bose	Arati Bhattacharya, Swapan Kumar, Uttam Kumar		
Sabyasachi	Piyush Bose	Uttam Kumar, Supriya Devi, Anil Chatterjee	Drama	
Sesh Raksha	Shankar Bhattacharya	Anil Chatterjee, Sabitri Chatterjee, Dipankar De		

== 1978 ==
Title	Director	Cast	Genre	Notes
Adyashakti Mahamaya	Purnendu Roy ChoWdhury	Gurudas Bandopadhyay, Asit Baran, Lily Chakravarty	Devotional	
Babla	Agradoot	Shobha Sen, Probha Devi, Jahar Ganguly		
Bandie	Alo Sircar	Uttam Kumar, Utpal Dutt, Amjad Khan	Action	
Bansari	Ashim Banerjee	Mithun Chakraborty, Sumitra Mukherjee		
Charmurti	Umanath Bhattacharya	Chinmoy Roy, Rabi Ghosh, Kajal Gupta	Comedy, Adventure	
Dak Diye Jai	Ranjitmul Kankaria	Anup Kumar, Sumitra Mukherjee, Subrata Chatterjee	Drama	
Dhanraj Tamang	Pijush Bose	Uttam Kumar, Chhaya Devi, Anil Chatterjee	Action	
Dui Purush	Sushil Mukhopadhyay	Uttam Kumar, Dilip Roy, Supriya Choudhury	Action, Drama	
Ganadevata	Tarun Majumdar	Soumitra Chatterjee, Kali Bannerjee, Sandhya Roy	Drama	
Jiban Trishna	Asit Sen	Suchitra Sen, Uttam Kumar, Bikash Roy	Romance, Drama	
Maan Aviman	Sukhen Das	Anil Chatterjee, Sumitra Mukherjee, Chhaya Devi	Drama	
Nadi Theke Sagare	Arabinda Mukhopadhyay	Soumitra Chatterjee, Sandhya Roy, Mithun Chakraborty	Drama	
Nishan	S. S. Balan	Uttam Kumar, Arati Bhattacharya	Action	
Rajani	Dinen Gupta	Ranjit Mallick, Sumitra Mukherjee, Dipankar Dey	Drama	
Saat Bhai Champa	Chitra Samathi	Biswajit Chatterjee, Sandhya Roy, Chhanda Chatterjee	Romance, Drama	
Striker	Archan Chakraborty	Samit Bhanja, Anil Chatterjee	Sports Drama	

== 1979 ==
Title	Director	Cast	Genre	Notes
Arun Barun O Kiranmala	Barun Kabasi	Tarun Kumar, Dilip Roy	Fantasy	
Bono Basar	Sushil Roy	Lina Bannerjee, Satya Bannerjee, Samit Bhanja		
Chirantan	Gurudas Bagchi	Sumitra Mukherjee, Vasant Choudhury, Rabi Ghosh		
Devdas	Dilip Roy	Soumitra Chatterjee, Uttam Kumar, Supriya Choudhury	Romantic Drama	
Ek Din Pratidin	Mrinal Sen	Mamata Shankar, Gita Sen	Parallel	
Ghatkali	Bimal Roy, jr.	Rabi Ghosh, Anup Kumar, Mahua Roy Chowdhury		
Jata Mat Tata Path	Gurudas Bagchi	Gurudas Banerjee	Drama	Viewable on YouTube
Joi Baba Felunath	Satyajit Ray	Soumitra Chatterjee, Santosh Dutta	Mystery	
Meghnad Badh	Shakti Chattopadhyay	N. T. Rama Rao, Anjali Devi, S. V. Ranga Rao	Drama	
Naukadubi	Ajoy Kar	Kali Bannerjee, Soumitra Chatterjee, Utpal Dutt		
Neem Annapurna	Buddhadev Dasgupta	Sunil Mukherjee		
Pankhiraj	Pijush Basu	Uttam Kumar, Soumitra Chatterjee, Nandita Bose, Utpal Dutt	Drama	
Parashuram	Mrinal Sen	Arun Mukherjee, Bibhas Chakraborty	Drama	
Priyatama	Dinen Gupta	Mahua Roy Chowdhury, Sumitra Mukherjee, Kaushik Banerjee		
Sabuj Dwiper Raja	Tapan Sinha	Samit Bhanja, Lily Chakravarty	Children's	
Samadhan	Jayanto Basu	Ishani Bannerjee, Tarun Kumar Chatterjee, Chhaya Devi		
Sreekanther Will	Dinen Gupta	Gita Dey, Tapati Ghosh, Shyamal Ghoshal		
Sunayana	Sukhen Das	Uttam Kumar, Subhendu Chatterjee, Dilip Roy		
