= Haridhan Mukherjee =

Indian actor and singer (1907–2004)

- Born: Deenabandhu Mukherjee; 10 November 1907; Gobardanga, Bengal Presidency, British India
- Died: 26 December 2004 (aged 97); Kolkata, India
- Occupations: Actor, singer
- Children: Sunil Mukherjee

Haridhan Mukherjee (10 November 1907 – 26 December 2004) was an Indian actor and singer in Bengali cinema from West Bengal. He is known for his work in Bengali theatre as well as Bengali films. He brought characters to life through his versatile acting talents.

== Early life ==
Mukherjee was born on 10 November 1907 in Khatuya village near Gobardanga in the 24 Parganas district of British India. His birth name was Deenabandhu Mukherjee. His father was Bhubanmohan and his mother was Giribala Devi. His father died when he was very young, and his mother raised him and his brother. He studied at the Shyambazar A.V. School. Due to extreme financial hardship, he used to sell lozenges to his friends at school. Saving 30 rupees in a short time, he tried to do business with soap and powder, and then a rice business, but neither succeeded. Borrowing money from his elder brother's friend, he started selling potatoes in Hatibagan. He used to act in small roles in school plays, and one day received praise from the school's secretary, the playwright Amrita Lal Basu.

== Career ==
Haridhan Mukherjee's childhood was a life of poverty and hardship, but he continued his struggle; his passions were singing and acting. Therefore, he sold potatoes during the day and attended theatre, Kavigan, Ramayana, and Panchali gatherings at night. Acting and singing the Ramayana were his obsessions since childhood; he could remember a song after hearing it just once. He also learned Kirtan from Nabadwip Brajabasi. His singing deeply impressed Ashutosh Mukherjee and Maharaja Manindra Chandra Nandy of Cossimbazar. Hearing his singing, Rabindranath Tagore gifted him a Kantha-stitched shawl. He even sang for Mahatma Gandhi. He did not stop there and began acting in plays, particularly in female roles. He portrayed female characters in many plays, such as Pather Sheshe, Bibaha Bibhrat, Alibaba, and more.

Haridhan played the role of Moshaheb in his first film, Khasdakhal, based on a play by Amritalal Basu. Then, in 1943, he got the opportunity to play a small Baul character in the film Sahar Theke Dure, directed by the famed Sailajananda Mukhopadhyay. The song "Radhe, Bhul Kore Tui Chinli Na Tor Premer Shyamrai," sung by Dhananjay Bhattacharya and lip-synced by Haridhan, became wildly popular. Haridhan's cinematic career was truly reborn under the direction of Debaki Bose. He appeared in Debaki Bose's 1944 film Sandhi, which marked Haridhan's debut as a comedian. His delivery of the dialogue "Joy Ma Japanjapini" became a massive hit. The film Sharey Chuattor marked the debut of the romantic pair Uttam Kumar and Suchitra Sen, with Haridhan Mukherjee playing the role of a grumpy boarding house member. Furthermore, he delivered humorous performances in numerous films, such as the second master's protege in Saheb Bibi Golam, the women's boarding house landlord in Basanta Bilap, the maternal uncle in Miss Priyambada, and the doctor in Mouchak. He also acted in films like Parash Pathar, Phuleswari, Dhanyee Meye, and Bhola Moira. His final released film was Tuni Bou (1987). During his acting career, he appeared in over 140 films. He worked with prominent directors including Niren Lahiri, Debaki Bose, Satyajit Ray, Nirmal Dey, Tarun Majumdar, Arabinda Mukhopadhyay and Hiren Nag.

Upon leaving films, he began dedicating his time to theatre; "theatre was his life." He acted in plays such as Kabi, Ulka, Adarsha Hindu Hotel, Ami Mantri Hobo, Krishnakanter Will, Samadhan, Devdas, Saheb Bibi Golam, and Ramer Sumati. He performed at the Rangmahal Theatre for about twenty-two years and at the Star Theatre for his final eighteen years. He also performed in radio dramas for All India Radio (*Akashvani*) at the invitation of Birendra Krishna Bhadra. His final stage performance was in the play Pasher Bari at the Star Theatre in 1991, the same year the theatre burned down. In his later years, he received numerous honors and awards from organizations such as the University of Calcutta, BFJA, West Bengal Natya Academy, Federation of Film Societies of India, and the Jogesh Mime Academy. Governor K. V. Raghunatha Reddy presented him with the Sangeet Natak Akademi Award.

== Death ==
He broke his hip after falling in his Salt Lake residence and became bedridden. He passed away on 26 December 2004.

== Filmography ==
Year	Film
1943	Sahar Theke Dure
1944	Sandhi
1950	Vidyasagar
1950	Maryada
1953	Raja Krishnachandra
1953	Sharey Chuattor
1955	Joy Maa Kali Boarding
1956	Shyamali
1957	Harishchandra
1958	Parash Pathar
1958	Jamalaye Jibanta Manush
1962	Kanchenjungha
1962	Dada Thakur
1963	Palatak
1965	Mahapurush
1965	Abhaya O Srikanta
1967	Balika Badhu
1967	Antony Firingee
1968	Goopy Gyne Bagha Byne
1969	Bibaha Bibhrat
1971	Dhanyee Meye
1973	Basanta Bilap
1973	Shriman Prithviraj
1974	Thagini
1974	Fuleswari
1975	Agnishwar
1977	Bhola Moira
1979	Ghatkali
1980	Hirak Rajar Deshe
