= Anup Kumar (Bengali actor) =

Indian actor

- Born: Satyen Das; 17 June 1930; Calcutta, British India
- Died: 3 September 1998 (aged 68); Kolkata, West Bengal, India
- Occupations: Actor, Cinema of West Bengal
- Years active: 1938–1998
- Relatives: Deepjit Das (grandson)

Anup Kumar (Bengali: অনুপ কুমার; 17 June 1930 – 3 September 1998) was an Indian actor who was known for his work in Bengali cinema.

== Early life ==
Anup Kumar was born on 17 June 1930 in Calcutta, British India. His real name was Satyen Das. His parents were Dhirendra Nath Das who was a singer and actor and was closely associated with the famous poet and composer, Kazi Nazrul Islam [1899-1976], and Bijoya Das. He passed his Matriculation at the Calcutta Jubilee Institution. In 1986, he married actress Aloka Ganguly.

== Acting career ==
Anup Kumar took his acting lessons from his father and Sisir Kumar Bhaduri. He started acting quite early in life. He got his first break as a child artist in Dhiren Ganguly's film Halkatha (1938). Palatak, Jiban Kahini, Alor Pipasa, Nimantran, Thagini and Ganadevata were the movies which exposed his versatility as a{{n actor. He was also involved with live theatre, yatras, and film directing.

In 1964, he was awarded the BFJA Award for Best Actor for his performance in the film Palatak. He received a silver medal from the Star Theatre. In 1988, he won the West Bengal Natya Academy Award. In 1989, he was awarded with Siromoni Prize and in 1991, he was awarded Best Director for his yatras. In 1997, he was recognized by the BFJA Awards for completion of 50 years in films.

Anup Kumar played comic relief in films such as Basanta Bilap, Mouchak, Fuleswari, Ek Je Chhilo Desh, Dadar Kirti, Palatak, Protisodh etc.

== Politics ==
In 1996, Kumar stood for election to the Vidhan Sabha as a CPI(M) representative from Cossipore; but he was not elected.

== Filmography ==
Year	Title	Role	Director	Co-Star	Notes
1934	Halkatha		Dhirendranath Ganguly		
1946	Sangram		Ardhendu Mukherjee		
1948	Bankalekha		Chitta Bose		
1948	Dhatri Debata		Kali Prasad Ghose		
1949	Sankalpa		Agradoot		
1949	Krishna Kaberi		Bidhayak Bhattacharya		
1949	Sakshigopal		Gour See		
1950	Vidyasagar		Kali Prasad Ghose	Pahari Sanyal	
1950	Maryada		Digambar Chatterjee		
1951	Bhakta Raghunath		Debnarayan Gupta		
1951	Barjatri		Satyen Bose	Kali Banerjee	
1952	Pasher Bari		Sudhir Mukherjee	Sabitri Chatterjee, Satya Bandyopadhyay	
1952	Rani		L. V. Prasad		
1953	Bansher Kella		Sudhir Mukherjee		
1953	Rami Chandidas		Debnarayan Gupta	Sandhyarani	
1953	Raja Krishnachandra		Sudhirbandhu Bannerjee		
1953	Swashurbari		Arun Choudhury		
1954	Nil Shari		Sudhirbandhu Bannerjee		
1954	Aaj Sandhyay		Sudhir Mukherjee		
1954	Mahila Mahal		Binu Bardhan		
1954	Bidhilipi	Anup	Manu Sen		
1954	Annapurnar Mandir		Naresh Mitra	Uttam Kumar, Sabitri Chatterjee, Suchitra Sen	
1954	Agni Pareeksha		Agradoot	Uttam Kumar, Suchitra Sen	First movie with Uttam Kumar, Suchitra Sen
1954	Ei Satyi		Suresh Haldar		
1955	Rani Rashmoni		Kali Prasad Ghose	Malina Devi, Gurudas Banerjee, Asitbaran	
1955	Anupama	Keshto	Agradoot		
1955	Debatra		Haridas Bhattacharya		
1955	Joy Maa Kali Boarding		Sadhan Sarkar		
1955	Kankabatir Ghat		Chitta Bose		
1955	Mejo Bou	Debnarayan Gupta			
1955	Sagarika		Agragami	Uttam Kumar, Suchitra Sen	
1956	Tonsil		Tapan Sinha	Madhabi Mukherjee	
1956	Ekti Raat		Chitta Bose	Uttam Kumar, Suchitra Sen, Sabita Chatterjee, Kamal Mitra, Pahari Sanyal, Malina Devi	
1956	Shankar Narayan Bank		Niren Lahiri	Uttam Kumar	
1956	Asamapta		Ratan Chatterjee		
1956	Shyamali		Ajoy Kar	Uttam Kumar, Kaberi Bose, Malina Devi	
1956	Madan Mohan	Amal Kumar Bose			
1956	Putrabadhu		Chitta Bose		
1956	Nagardola		Amalendu Basu		
1956	Sinthir Sindoor		Ardhendu Sen		
1956	Mahakavi Girish Chandra		Modhu Bose	Pahari Sanyal, Gurudas Banerjee	
1957	Harjit		Manu Sen	Uttam Kumar, Anita Guha	
1957	Ulka		Naresh Mitra	Dipak Mukherjee	
1957	Ratri Sheshey	Santosh Guharay			
1957	Punarmilan		Manu Sen	Uttam Kumar, Manju De, Anil Chatterjee, Sabitri Chatterjee, Jahar Ganguli	
1957	Prithibi Amare Chay		Niren Lahiri	Uttam Kumar, Mala Sinha	
1957	Adarsha Hindu Hotel		Ardhendu Sen	Sabitri Chatterjee	
1957	Harishchandra		Phani Burma		
1957	Khela Bhangar Khela		Ratan Chatterjee		
1957	Surer Parashe		Chitta Bose		
1957	Rastar Chhele		Chitta Bose		
1957	Kancha-Mithey		Jyotirmoy Roy		
1957	Ogo Sunchho		Kamal Ganguly	Bhanu Banerjee	
1957	Garer Math		Aaj Production Unit		
1957	Pathe Holo Deri		Agradoot	Uttam Kumar, Suchitra Sen, Chhabi Biswas	
1957	Janmatithi		Dilip Mukherji Sr.		
1958	Kalamati		Tapan Sinha		
1958	Daktarbabu		Bishu Dasgupta		
1958	Priya		Salil Sen		
1958	Lila Kanka		Satish Dasgupta		
1958	Marmabani		Sushil Majumdar		
1958	Nagini Kanyar Kahini		Salil Sen		
1959	Derso Khokhar Kando		Kamal Ganguly		
1959	Sashibabur Sansar		Sudhir Mukherjee	Chhabi Biswas, Chandrabati Devi, Sabitri Chatterjee, Arundhati Devi, Basanta Choudhury	
1959	Gali Thekey Rajpath		Prafulla Chakraborty	Uttam Kumar, Sabitri Chatterjee	
1959	Noukabilas		Sudhir Mukherjee		
1960	Dui Bechara		Dilip Bose		
1960	Prabesh Nishedh		Sushil Ghosh		
1960	Baishey Shravana		Mrinal Sen	Gyanesh Mukherjee, Madhabi Mukherjee	
1960	Smriti Tuku Thak	Shobha's brother	Tarun Majumdar, Dilip Mukherjee, Sachin Mukherjee		
1960	Natun Fasal		Hemchandra Chunder	Kali Banerjee, Supriya Devi	
1960	Biyer Khata		Nirmal Dey		
1961	Mr. & Mrs. Choudhury		Ashim Pal		
1961	Bishkanya		Shri Jayadratha	Tarun Kumar	
1961	Arghya		Debaki Bose		
1961	Kathin Maya		Sushil Majumdar		
1961	Kanchanmulya		Nirmal Mitra		
1961	Aaj Kal Parshu		Nirmal Sarbagna		
1961	Ahwan		Aravind Mukherjee	Anil Chatterjee, Sandhya Roy	
1961	Maa		Chitta Bose		
1961	Kanamachi		Tas Unit		
1962	Abasheshe		Mrinal Sen		
1962	Agnisikha		Rajen Tarafdar		
1962	Shesh Chinha		Bibhuti Chakraborty		
1962	Abhisarika		Kamal Majumdar		
1962	Benarasi		Arup Guhathakurta	Ruma Guhathakurta	
1962	Shubhoddristi		Chitta Bose		
1963	Dui Bari		Ashim Pal		
1963	Barnachora		Aravind Mukherjee		
1963	Saat Bhai		Taru Mukherjee		
1963	High Heel		Dilip Bose	Sandhya Roy, Bhanu Banerjee, Anil Chatterjee	
1963	Palatak	Basanta Chatujye	Tarun Majumdar	Sandhya Roy, Asitbaran, Bharati Devi, Jahar Roy	
1963	Dui Nari		Jiban Ganguly		
1963	Kanchankanya		Sukhendu Chakraborty		
1963	Shreyasi		Shyam Chakraborty		
1964	Tahole		Gurudas Bagchi	Bikash Roy, Dilip Mukherjee	
1964	Jiban Kahini		Rajen Tarafdar	Sandhya Roy, Bikash Roy	
1964	Kashtipathar		Aravind Mukherjee		
1964	Pratinidhi		Mrinal Sen	Soumitra Chatterjee, Sabitri Chatterjee	
1964	Bingshati Janani		Khagen Roy		
1965	Alor Pipasa	Sohan Lal	Tarun Majumdar	Sandhya Roy, Basanta Choudhury	
1965	Mahalagna		Kanak Mukherjee		
1965	Antaral		Agradoot		
1965	Jaya		Chitta Bose	Malina Devi, Pahari Sanyal, Sabitri Chatterjee, Anil Chatterjee, Lily Chakraborti, Tarun Kumar	
1965	Ektuku Basa		Tarun Majumdar	Sandhya Roy, Soumitra Chatterjee	
1965	Dinanter Alo		Mangal Chakraborty		
1965	Dolna		Partha Prathim Choudhury		
1965	Mukhujye Paribar		Ajit Ganguly		
1965	Tapasi		Agradoot		
1966	Rajdrohi		Niren Lahiri	Uttam Kumar, Anjana Bhoumick, Bikash Roy	
1966	Mayabini Lane		Kanak Mukherjee		
1966	Kalanki Raat		Binoy Bannerjee		
1966	Nutan Jiban		Aravind Mukherjee	Anil Chatterjee, Pahari Sanyal, Sandhya Roy, Jahar Roy, Sumita Sanyal	
1966	Shesh Tin Din		Prafulla Chakraborty		
1966	Uttar Purush		Chitrakar		
1966	Last Three Days		Prafulla Chakraborty		
1966	Natun Jiban		Aurobindo Mukhopadhyay		
1967	Hathat Dekha		Nityananda Dutta		
1967	Jiban Mrityu		Hiren Nag	Uttam Kumar, Supriya Devi, Kamal Mitra	
1967	Kheya		Rupak Gosthi		
1967	Prastar Swakshar	Sujit	Salil Dutta	Sandhya Roy	
1967	Balika Bodhu		Tarun Majumdar	Partha Mukherjee, Mousumi Chatterjee	
1968	Chhotto Jignansa		Jagannath Chatterjee	Biswajeet, Madhabi Mukherjee	
1968	Teen Adhyay		Mangal Chakraborty		
1968	Baluchari		Ajit Ganguly	Anil Chatterjee, Sabitri Chatterjee, Lily Chakraborti	
1968	Gar Nasimpur		Ajit Lahiri	Uttam Kumar, Biswajeet, Madhabi Mukherjee, Dev Mukherjee	
1968	Boudi		Dilip Bose		
1968	Jiban Sangeet		Aravind Mukherjee		
1969	Dadu		Ajit Ganguly		
1969	Duranta Charai		Jagannath Chatterjee		
1969	Pita Putra	Gobinda (Gabin)	Aravind Mukherjee		
1969	Panna Heere Chuni		Amal Dutta		
1970	Samantaral		Gurudas Bagchi		
1970	Aleyar Alo		Mangal Chakraborty		
1970	Kalankita Nayak		Salil Dutta	Uttam Kumar, Sabitri Chatterjee, Bikash Roy, Aparna Sen	
1970	Padmagolap		Ajit Lahiri		
1970	Nishi Padma		Aravind Mukherjee	Uttam Kumar, Sabitri Chatterjee	
1970	Manjari Opera		Agradoot	Uttam Kumar, Sabitri Chatterjee	
1970	Ei Korechho Bhalo	Ashish Bannerjee	Ajit Bannerjee		
1971	Nimantran		Tarun Majumdar	Sandhya Roy, Nondini Maliya	
1971	Pratham Basanta		Nirmal Mitra		
1971	Bibaha Bibhrat		Ashim Bannerjee		
1971	Anya Mati Anya Rang		Ramprasad Chakraborty		
1971	Attatar Din Pare		Ajit Lahiri		
1972	Biraj Bou		Manu Sen	Uttam Kumar, Madhabi Mukherjee	
1972	Shesh Parba		Chitta Bose		
1972	Naya Michhil		Piyush Kanti Ganguly		
1972	Jiban Sangram		Prabhat Chakraborty		
1973	Shabari		Ashok Das		
1973	Basanta Bilap		Dinen Gupta	Soumitra Chatterjee, Aparna Sen, Rabi Ghosh	
1973	Natun Diner Alo		Ajit Ganguly	Soumitra Chatterjee, Sandhyarani, Sabitri	
1973	Ek Je Chhilo Bagh		Uma Prasad Moitra		
1973	Daabi		Kanak Mukherjee		
1974	Mouchak		Aravind Mukherjee	Uttam Kumar, Sabitri Chatterjee, Ranjit Mallick	
1974	Pranta Rekha		Dinen Gupta		
1974	Phulu Thakurma		Sadhan Sarkar	Kamal Mitra, Malina Devi, Satya Banerjee	
1974	Fuleswari		Tarun Majumdar	Sandhya Roy, Samit Bhanja	
1974	Sangini		Dinen Gupta		
1974	Thagini		Tarun Majumdar	Sandhya Roy, Utpal Dutta, Robi Ghosh	
1974	Ujala Hi Ujala	Anuradha's Father	S. M. Sagar		
1975	Harano Prapti Niruddesh		Swadesh Sarkar	Dipankar De, Sandhya Roy	
1975	Tin Pari Chhoy Premik		Dilip Bannerjee		
1975	Rag Anurag	Barun	Dinen Gupta	Ranjit Mallick, Aparna Sen	
1975	Nishimrigaya		Dinen Gupta		
1975	Phulshajya		Sarathi		
1976	Sei Chokh		Salil Dutta		
1976	Swikarokti		Gyanesh Mukherjee		
1976	Ajasra Dhanyabad		Aravind Mukherjee	Soumitra Chatterjee, Sumitra Mukherjee, Basanta Choudhry	
1976	Ananda Mela		Mangal Chakraborty	Uttam Kumar, Arati Bhattacharyya	
1976	Do Anjaane	Amit's co-worker	Dulal Guha		
1976	Chander Kachhakachhi		Dilip Mukherji		
1977	Babu Moshai		Salil Dutta		
1977	Bhola Moira		Piyush Kanti Ganguly	Uttam Kumar, Supriya Devi, Bikash Roy, Lily Chakraborti	
1977	Pratisruti		Pinaki Mukherjee	Ranjit Mallick, Santu Mukherjee	
1977	Golap Bou		Shakti Bandyopadhyay		
1977	Baba Taraknath		Sunil Bannerjee	Sandhya Roy, Biswajeet	
1977	Ek Je Chhilo Desh		Tapan Sinha	Dipankar De, Sumitra Mukherjee, Sonali Gupta, Santosh Dutta	
1977	Ae Prithibi Pantha Niwas		Arabinda Mukhopadhyay		
1977	Sanai	Haru	Dinen Gupta		
1977	Pratima		Palash Bannerjee	Soumitra Chatterje, Sumitra Mukherjee	
1977	Proxy		Dinen Gupta	Ranjit Mallick, Aparna Sen, Satya Banerjee	
1978	Dak Diye Jai	Mahendra (postman)	Ranjit Mull Kankaria		
1978	Nishkriti		Sunil Basu Mullick	Satya Banerjee, Nirmal Kumar, Madhabi Mukherjee	
1978	Nadi Theke Sagare		Aravind Mukherjee		
1978	Tusi		Gurudas Bagchi	Anil Chatterjee	
1978	Tilottama	Madan	Dinen Gupta	Ranjit Mallick, Sumitra Mukherjee, Utpal Dutta, Gita Dey	
1979	Debdas		Dilip Roy		
1979	Ghatkali		Bimal Roy Jr.	Satya Banerjee	
1979	Ganadevata		Tarun Majumdar		
1979	Chirantan		Gurudas Bagchi		
1979	Sikandar		Nur Hossain Bolai		
1980	Dadar Kirti	Bhombol	Tarun Majumdar	Mahua Roychoudhury, Debasree Roy, Tapas Paul, Ayan Banerjee, Kali Banerjee	
1981	Meghmukti		Tarun Majumdar		
1981	Subarnalata		Bijoy Bose	Madhabi Mukherjee	
1981	Khelar Putul		Tarun Majumdar		
1981	Sei Sur		Niranjan Dey		
1981	Pratishodh		Sukhen Das	Uttam Kumar, Soumitra Chatterjee, Mohua Roychowdhury	
1981	Swami Stri		Gurudas Bagchi		
1981	Shahar Theke Dure	Ratan Thakur	Tarun Majumdar	Samit Bhanja, Sandhya Roy	
1981	Bodhan		Amal Dutta		
1982	Pipasa		Inder Sen		
1982	Maa Bhabani Maa Aamar		Sadhan Choudhury		
1982	Imon Kalyan	Nidhi (servant)	Shantimoy Bannerjee	Uttam Kumar, Supriya Devi, Dipankar De	
1982	Preyasi		Shrikanta Guha-Thakurta		
1982	Mayer Ashirbad		Parimal Ghosh		
1982	Amrita Kumbher Sandhaney		Dilip Ray	Subhendu Chatterjee, Bhanu Banerjee, Aparna Sen, Lily Chakraborti	
1982	Prafulla		Sujoy Datta		
1982	Sonar Bangla		Kedar Agarwal		
1982	Shathe Shathyang		Dinen Gupta	Ranjit Mallick	
1983	Prayashchitta		Arabinda Mukhopadhyay		
1983	Amar Geeti		Tarun Majumdar	Soumitra Chatterjee, Biswajeet, Sandhya Roy	
1983	Srinkhal		Abir Basu		
1983	Sansarer Itikatha		Aravind Mukherjee		
1983	Nishi Bhor		Rashbehari Sinha		
1983	Abhinoy Noy		Archan Chakraborty		
1983	Arpita		Aravind Mukherjee		
1983	Jyotsna Ratri		Mrinal Bhattacharya		
1983	Jiban Maran		Sukhen Das		
1983	Indira		Dinen Gupta		
1983	Ei Chhilo Mone		Subir Sarkar		
1983	Samapti		Bijoy Bose		
1984	Suryatrishna		Ashutosh Bannerjee		
1984	Lal Golap		Jahar Biswas		
1984	Mohanar Dike		Biresh Chatterjee	Dipankar De, Aparna Sen, Sumitra Mukherjee	
1984	Agni Shuddhi		Sachin Adhikari		
1984	Ahuti		Prabir Mitra		
1984	Rashiphal		Dinen Gupta		
1984	Sorgol		Biswajit		
1984	Shatru		Anjan Choudhury	Ranjit Mallick	
1985	Bhalobasa Bhalobasa		Tarun Majumdar	Tapas Paul, Debosree Roy, Utpal Dutta	
1985	Baikunther Will		Sushil Mukherjee		
1985	Harishchandra Shaibya		Ardhendu Chatterjee		
1985	Sandhya Pradeep		Anjan Mukherjee		
1985	Till Theke Tal		Shantimoy Bannerjee		
1985	Putulghar		Amit Sarkar		
1985	Aamar Prithibi		Bimal Bhowmick		
1985	Nilkantha		Dilip Ray	Dilip Ray, Aparna Sen, Mamata Shankar	
1986	Swarga Sukh		Bablu Samaddar		
1986	Anurager Chhoan		Jahar Biswas	Tapas Paul, Mohua Roychowdhury	
1986	Dui Adhyay		Goutam Mukhopadhyay		
1986	Urbashe		Salil Dutta		
1986	Abhishap		Biresh Chatterjee		
1986	Daktar Bou		Jagadish Mandal		
1986	Shatru	Inspector Anup Chatterjee	Pramod Chakravorty	Hindi film	
1986	Ashirwad		Biresh Mukherjee		
1986	Ashirbad		Biresh Chattopadhyay		
1986	Mukhujjey Paribar		Sunil Basu Mullick		
1987	Bidrohi		Anjan Choudhury		
1987	Lalan Fakir		Shakti Chatterjee	Ashim Kumar	
1987	Raj Purush		Iman Kalyan Chatterjee		
1987	Mahamilan		Dinen Gupta		
1987	Radharani		Ajit Bannerjee		
1987	Swarnamoyeer Thikana		Sushil Mukherjee		
1987	Mouna Mukhar		Sarit Bannerjee		
1987	Ekanto Apon		Biresh Chattopadhyay	Victor Banerjee, Aparna Sen	
1987	Sargam		Dinen Gupta		
1987	Abir		Kamal Majumdar		
1987	Arpan		Srinivas Chakraborty		
1987	Dabar Chal		Kumar Gangopadhyay		
1987	Dolonchanpa		Sujit Guha		
1987	Paap Punnya		Rajat Das		
1988	Kalankini Nayika		Shuven Sarkar		
1988	Boba Sanai		Ajit Ganguly		
1988	Channachara		Anjan Mukherjee		
1988	Kidnap		Abir Basu		
1988	Antaranga		Dinen Gupta		
1988	Tumi Koto Sundar		Manoj Ghosh		
1988	Debi Baran		Shrikanta Guha-Thakurta		
1988	Surer Akashe		Biresh Chatterjee		
1988	Dena Paona		Sukhen Das		
1988	Agaman		Tarun Majumdar	Tapas Paul, Debosree Roy, Sandhya Roy, Utpal Dutta	
1988	Surer Sathi		Tapan Saha		
1988	Ora Charjan		Shamit Bhanja		
1989	Biday		Ajit Ganguly		
1989	Mangaldip		Haranath Chakraborty		
1989	Shatarupa		Palash Bannerjee		
1989	Aparanher Alo		Agradoot	Sandhyarani	
1989	Abhisar		Sanat Dutta		
1989	Asha		Sajal Deb		
1989	Jhankar		Sujit Guha		
1989	Aamar Shapath		Prabhat Roy		
1989	Aghatan Ajo Ghate		Amal Mitra		
1989	Asha-O-Bhalobasha		Sujit Guha		
1989	Asha		Anup Sengupta		
1989	Mangal Deep		Haranath Chakraborty		
1989	Satarupa		Palash Bandopadhyay		
1989	Chhandaneer		Utpalendu Chakrabarty		
1990	Anuraag		Jahar Biswas		
1990	Apan Aamar Apan		Tarun Majumdar		
1990	Raktareen		Sushil Mukherjee		
1990	Garmil		Dilip Ray		
1990	Debota		Abhijit Sen		
1991	Ahankar		Shrikanta Guha-Thakurta		
1991	Nabab		Haranath Chakraborty		
1991	Rajnartaki		Narayan Chakraborty		
1991	Nilimay Nil		Biresh Chatterjee	Tapas Paul	
1991	Bourani		Bhabesh Kundu		
1991	Abhagini		Bablu Samaddar		
1991	Sajani Go Sajani		Tarun Majumdar		
1991	Pati Param Guru		Biresh Chattopadhyay		
1991	Ek Pashla Brishti		Nitish Ray		
1991	Path-O-Prasad		Tarun Majumdar		
1991	Nawab		Haranath Chakraborty		
1992	Anutap		Prabhat Ray		
1992	Pennam Kolkata		Gurudas Bagchi		
1992	Indrajit		Anjan Choudhury		
1992	Priya		Shibu Mitra		
1992	Mahashoy		Mukul Dutta		
1992	Satya Mithya		A. K. Mintu		
1992	Nabarupa		Amal Ray Ghatak		
1992	Rupaban	Mastermoshai	Harun-Ur-Rashid		
1993	Mon Mane Na		Inder Sen	Prosenjit Chatterjee, Silpa das	
1993	Krantikal		Amal Sur		
1993	Maya Mamata		Anjan Choudhury		
1993	Bhranta Pathik		Ardhendu Chatterjee		
1993	Shraddhanjali		Shrikanta Guha-Thakurta		
1993	Mishti Madhur		Santimoy Bandyopadhyay		
1993	Kanyadan		Amal Dutta		
1993	Prithibir Shesh Station		Lalit Mukhopadhyay		
1993	Tapasya		Rajat Das		
1993	Mayer Ashirbad		Alamgir		
1994	Tobu Mone Rekho		Nitish Ray		
1994	Atikram		Amal Dutta		
1994	Geet Sangeet		Subhash Sen		
1994	Nati Binodini		Dinen Gupta		
1994	Ami O Maa		Sukhen Chakraborty		
1994	Salma Sundari		Ajit Ganguly		
1994	Katha Chhilo		Tarun Majumdar		
1994	Lal Pan Bibi		Prashanta Nanda		
1994	Harishchandra		Phani Burma		
1995	Sangharsha		Haranath Chakraborty	Prosenjit Chatterjee, Ranjit Mallick, Tapas Paul, Laboni Sarkar	
1995	Mashal		Shankar Ray		
1995	Mejo Bou		Bablu Samaddar		
1995	Rangin Basanta		Sandip Chattopadhyay		
1995	Sansar Sangram		Chiranjit		
1996	Himghar		Sandip Ray	Anil Chatterjee	
1996	Rabibar		Nitish Mukhopadhyay		
1996	Joto Kando Kathmandute	Jatayu	Sandip Ray		TV Movie
1996	Sinthir Sindoor		Anup Sengupta		
1996	Tridhara		Prashanta Nanda		
1997	Ajker Santan		Haranath Chakraborty	Prosenjit Chatterjee, Ranjit Mallick, Tapas Paul	
1997	Jiban Sandhan'		Ramprasad Chakraborty		
1997	Pratirodh		Srinivas Chakraborty		
1997	Matribhumi		Milan Bhowmik		
1997	Saptami	Pallab Ghosh			
1997	Bahurupa		Arabinda Mitra		
1997	Dabidar		Shyamal Basu		Last released film during his lifetime
1999	Neoti		Bablu Samaddar		
2009	Narak Guljar		Nitish Mukherjee		(final film role)
