= Bengal Film Journalists' Association – Best Lyricist Award =

Indian film award

Here is a list of the recipients of the Best Lyricist Award given by Bengal Film Journalists' Association and the films for which they won.

| Year | Lyricist | Film |
|---|---|---|
| 2018 | Ritam Sen | Projapoti Biskut |
| 2007 | Saran Dutta | Shikar |
| 2006 |
| 2005 |
| 2004 |
| 2003 |
| 2002 |
| 2001 |
| 2000 |
| 1999 | Lakshmikanta Ray |
| 1998 |
| 1997 |
| 1996 | Shibdas Banerjee | Sangsar Sangram |
| 1995 |
| 1994 |
| 1993 |
| 1992 |
| 1991 |
| 1990 |
| 1989 | Tarun Majumdar | Parashmoni |
| 1988 |
| 1987 | Gouri Prasanna Majumdar | Anurager Chhowa |
| 1986 | Pulak Bandyopadhyay | Bhalobasa Bhalobasa |
| 1985 |
| 1984 |
| 1983 |
| 1982 |
| 1981 |
| 1980 |
| 1979 |
| 1978 |
| 1977 |
| 1976 | Gouri Prasanna Majumdar | Sanyasi Raja |
| 1975 | Mukul Dutta | Phuleshwari |
| 1974 | Gouri Prasanna Majumdar | Bon Palashir Padabali |
| 1973 | Pulak Bandyopadhyay | Stree (1972 film) |
| 1972 |
| 1971 | Tarashankar Banerjee | Manjari Opera |
| 1970 |
| 1969 |
| 1968 | Gouri Prasanna Majumdar | Anthony Firingee |
| 1967 |
| 1966 |
| 1965 | Pronob Roy | Ke Tumi |
| 1964 | Mukul Dutta and Gouri Prasanna Majumdar | Palatak |
| 1963 | Tarashankar Banerjee | Hansuli Baker Upakatha |
| 1962 | Gouri Prasanna Majumdar | Swaralipi |
| 1961 |
| 1960 |
| 1959 |
| 1958 |
| 1957 |
| 1956 |
| 1955 |
| 1954 |
| 1953 |
| 1952 |
| 1951 |
| 1950 |
| 1949 |
| 1948 |
| 1947 |
| 1946 | Sailen Roy | Dui Purush |
| 1945 | Sailen Roy | Udayer Pathey |
| 1944 |
| 1943 |
| 1942 |

== See also ==
- Bengal Film Journalists' Association Awards
- Cinema of India
