= Apan Amar Apan =

1990 Indian Bengali-language film

- Theatrical release poster
- Directed by: Tarun Majumdar
- Written by: Tarun Majumdar
- Screenplay by: Tarun Majumdar
- Story by: Tarun Majumdar
- Produced by: Pradip Kundalia
- Starring: Tapas Paul; Prosenjit Chatterjee; Satabdi Roy
- Music by: R. D. Burman
- Release date: 13 April 1990
- Country: India
- Language: Bengali
- Budget: 35 Lakhs
- Box office: 50 Lakhs

Apan Amar Apan is a 1990 Bengali language drama film directed by Tarun Majumdar and produced by Pradip Kundalia. The film stars Tapas Paul, Prosenjit Chatterjee, Satabdi Roy in the lead roles. The music has been composed by R. D. Burman.

== Cast ==
- Tapas Paul
- Prosenjit Chatterjee
- Satabdi Roy
- Indrani Dutta
- Soumitra Chatterjee
- Subhendu Chatterjee
- Biplab Chatterjee
- Deepankar Dey
- Anup Kumar
- Shakuntala Barua
- Sanghamitra Bandyopadhyay
- Hemanta Mukherjee (Guest)
- Shibaji Chatterjee (Guest)
- Arundhati Holme Chowdhury (Guest)
- Shakti Thakur (Guest)
- Haimanti Shukla (Guest)

== Soundtrack ==
Apan Amar Apan

Soundtrack album by R. D. Burman
- Released: 1990

=== Track ===
Song	Singer
"Mon Bolchhe" - 1	Asha Bhosle
"Mon Bolchhe" - 2	Asha Bhosle
"Gun Gun Gun Gun"	Asha Bhosle
"Ek Je Chhilo Malgaadi"	R. D. Burman
"Andhare Kakhan Eshe"	Amit Kumar
"Emono Prahar Ashe"	Amit Kumar
"Priye Omon Kore"	Ramanuj Dasgupta
