= Pathbhola =

- poster
- Directed by: Tarun Majumdar
- Written by: Tarun Majumdar
- Story by: Tarun Majumdar
- Produced by: Ravindra Aggarwal; Ramkrishna Aggarwal
- Starring: Utpal Dutta; Sandhya Roy; Tapas Paul; Prosenjit Chatterjee; Abhishek Chatterjee; Shakti Thakur; Tuhin Banerjee; Nayna Das
- Cinematography: Pantu Nag
- Edited by: Ramesh Joshi
- Music by: Hemanta Mukherjee
- Production company: Shanti Films Corporations Pvt. Ltd.
- Distributed by: Kranti Films
- Release date: 10 October 1986
- Country: India
- Language: Bengali

Pathbhola (Bengali pronunciation: [pɔtʰbʱola]; transl. The Waywards) is a 1986 Indian Bengali-language revisionist Western-drama film written and directed by Tarun Majumdar. Produced by Ravindra Aggarwal and Ramkrishna Aggarwal under the banner of Shanti Films Corporations, the film stars an ensemble cast of Utpal Dutta, Sandhya Roy, Tapas Paul, Prosenjit Chatterjee, Abhishek Chatterjee, Nayna Das, Tuhin Bandyopadhyay and Shakti Thakur in the lead roles. It revolves around a reformist journey of five unemployed youths who flee from the law after getting involved with a conspiracy, and their refuge with an elderly man and his daughter-in-law.

== Plot ==
A group of five rebellious youths consisting of Rabi, Suman, Gupi, Haran and Kala, become known in the locality as waywards as a consequence of unemployment. One day, while out collecting their weekly protection money, they unwittingly falls into the trap set by Radhabinod, the owner of the biggest pharmaceutical company of the city, lured by his assurances, secures jobs at his factory, which produces adulterated pharmaceuticals. Radhabinod’s sole condition was that they must not display excessive curiosity regarding the nature of the pharmaceutical operations they were involved in; otherwise, he would hand them over to the police. The youths remain ignorant of the illegal nature of their work until a sudden police raid forces a confrontation. In the ensuing chaos and gun battle, they inadvertently kill a police officer. Terrified of the legal consequences and branded as criminals, the five friends flee the city and seek refuge in a remote, picturesque village.

While fleeing by train, upon hearing news of their arrest warrants broadcast over the radio and seeking to evade the heightened police vigilance at every station, they immediately disembark and arrive in a remote, desolate village deep within the Rarh region of Bengal. Here, under the cover of night, they raid a small house inhabited by an elderly, principled Tejen Banerjee, his compassionate daughter-in-law Abha, and their mute servant, Budhua. However, much to their astonishment, Tejen, a former freedom fighter, demonstrates a surprising agility despite his advanced age; he disarms them, seizes their own revolver to showcase his marksmanship, and simultaneously provides all five of them the fugitives with shelter as his guests, unaware of their criminal background.

Their lives take a transformative turn when they integrate into the quiet rhythms of rural life, and deeply get influenced by Tejen’s unwavering moral compass and his stories of sacrifice. There, Tejen challenges them to prove their true physical strength by continuously hacking away at the rocky soil for two straight hours—a task that leaves them all astonished. However, disregarding their age, Tejen and Abha proceed to demonstrate the feat themselves, tirelessly digging the earth for the first half-hour which have a deep and lasting impact in their mind. Tejen instructs them to remain there and toil to cultivate rice from that arduous soil. He issues a stern warning: should anyone harbor thoughts of escape, they would be struck down by Budhua’s unerring, poisoned arrows.

While in the village, the five men witness the duality of rural existence—the extreme poverty and hardship faced by the tribal communities contrasted with their profound sense of fellowship and integrity. This exposure acts as a catalyst for their internal reformation. However, the shadow of their past continues to loom over them. The shocking realization of the damage caused by the adulterated medicines they helped produce and the weight of the life they took ultimately leads them to a crossroad. When the village moneylenders relentlessly prey upon the innocent poor, the five spirited young men rose up to sternly put a stop to their exploitation. When the usurers shut down a village school run by a young woman named Rani, the five of them join forces to build a new school for her, right on Tejen's land. A romantic bond blossoms between Suman and Rani, while the group of five accorded Abha the status and respect of an elder sister. They learn from her about Ajay, her own husband as well as Tejen's son who also was a freedom fighter who escaped from the Cellular Jail; Ajay also had promised that he would definitely return to his family somehow.

Meanwhile, in Tejen’s absence, the group presents Abha with a red-bordered saree—a surprise gift for her wedding anniversary and decorates her bed with flowers. They gather under a tree for a musical session with Avbha; just then, Tejen arrives home and joins in their celebration. Moments later, upon entering the house and witnessing the elaborately decorated bridal bed, he summons the five friends and Rani to reveal the truth: Ajay is, in fact, no longer alive, having been shot by police gunfire while attempting to escape from prison. At the time, Tejen had offered Abha the false hope of Ajay’s return solely to shield the newlywed bride from such profound emotional trauma. Unbeknownst to any of them, Abha herself overhears this entire revelation; she returns to the tree where they had celebrated and there, she breathes her last.

Fulfilling a promise made to Ava, the five friends work together to cultivate paddy in the village fields and organize a Nabanna harvest festival. On the account of the reflection of the revelation of Ajay's death on their own wasted lives and misguided actions, Rabi calls the police and surrenders himself as the killer of the police officer, while simultaneously confessing to the murder of his own father. Along with him, Haran, Kala, and Gupi also turn themselves over to police custody; conversely, Suman, who was not directly implicated in any of the crimes insists on being arrested alongside them. However, Rabi and the others falsely claim that they had merely crossed paths with Suman during their train journey; invoking the sacred bond of friendship, they entrust Suman with the responsibility of staying behind in the village to look after Tejen and Rani. Thus, bidding farewell to Tejen, Rani, Suman, and all the villagers, the group walks away through the paddy fields in the custody of the police.

== Cast ==
- Utpal Dutta as Tejen Banerjee
- Sandhya Roy as Abha
- Tapas Paul as Rabi
- Prosenjit Chatterjee as Suman Mukherjee
- Nayna Das as Rani
- Abhishek Chatterjee as Gupi
- Tuhin Banerjee as Kala
- Shakti Thakur as Haran
- Nilkantha Sengupta as Budhua, a dumb person and Tejen's loyal servant
- Manju Dey
- Nirmal Kumar as Master Moshai
- Haradhan Banerjee as Radha Binod, a businessman
- Arun Mukherjee

== Awards ==
- National Film Award for Best Audiography – Durga Mitra, Jyoti Prasad Chatterjee
- Bengal Film Journalists' Association – Best Music Director Award – Hemanta Mukherjee
- Bengal Film Journalists' Association – Best Female Playback Award – Sujata Sarkar
