= Ganga (1960 film) =

- DVD cover
- Directed by: Rajen Tarafdar
- Music by: Salil Chowdhury
- Release date: 17 November 1960
- Country: India
- Language: Bengali

Ganga is a 1960 Bengali drama film directed by Rajen Tarafdar. This film narrates the life of river fishermen. This film was based on the 1946 same name novel of Samaresh Basu and made under Cine Art Productions Pvt. Ltd. banner. The music of this film was composed by Salil Chowdhury.

== Plot ==
Panchu is a fisherman. His young nephew Bilash, who is very short tempered, joins the profession. He wants to go to sea and capture fish. But Panchu is scared of it and does not want to allow Bilash to do so. He arranges the marriage of Bilash with Gardi who used to do fishing in Ichamati river.

== Cast ==
- Gyanesh Mukherjee
- Sandhya Roy
- Ruma Guha Thakurta
- Moni Srimani
- Niranjan Ray
- Sita Mukhopadhyay
- Md. Israil
- Namita Singha
- Sumana Bhattacharya
- Suruchi Sengupta
