= Bade Achche Lagte Hain (song) =

Song by Amit Kumar Ganguly

from the album Balika Badhu 1976
- Language: Hindi
- Genre: romantic
- Composer: R. D. Burman
- Lyricist: Anand Bakshi

"Bade Achche Lagte Hain" (transl. "I Like It So Much") is a Hindi song from the Indian film Balika Badhu (1976). Actor Sachin Pilgaonkar is seen in the picturisation of the song. Amit Kumar sang it under R. D. Burman's tune. The song became #26th song at the annual top chart of Binaca Geetmala.
