= Jiban Kahini =

- জীবন কাহিনী
- Directed by: Rajen Tarafdar
- Screenplay by: Rajen Tarafdar
- Story by: Shaktipada Rajguru
- Produced by: Rathin Tarafdar
- Starring: Bikash Roy; Sandhya Roy; Bhanu Bandyopadhyay
- Cinematography: Anil Gupta; Jyoti Laha
- Edited by: Tarun Dutta
- Music by: Prabir Majumder
- Production company: R. T. Films
- Release date: 28 February 1964
- Running time: 125 minutes
- Country: India
- Language: Bengali

Jiban Kahini (The Life Story) is a Bengali drama film directed by Rajen Tarafdar and produced by Rathin Tarafdar, based on a story of Shaktipada Rajguru. The film was released on 28 February 1964 under the banner of R. T. Films.

== Plot ==
An insurance agent burdened by debt tries to commit suicide. He encounters a young man facing even greater despair. Their meeting alters their course of life as both struggle with poverty and hope for a better future.

== Cast ==
- Bikash Roy
- Sandhya Roy
- Anup Kumar
- Bhanu Bandyopadhyay
- Jahar Ganguly
- Tarun Kumar
- Renuka Roy
- Sita Mukherjee
- Durgadas Bandyopadhyay

== External link ==
- Jiban Kahini at IMDb
