= Gourab Chatterjee =

Indian film and television actor

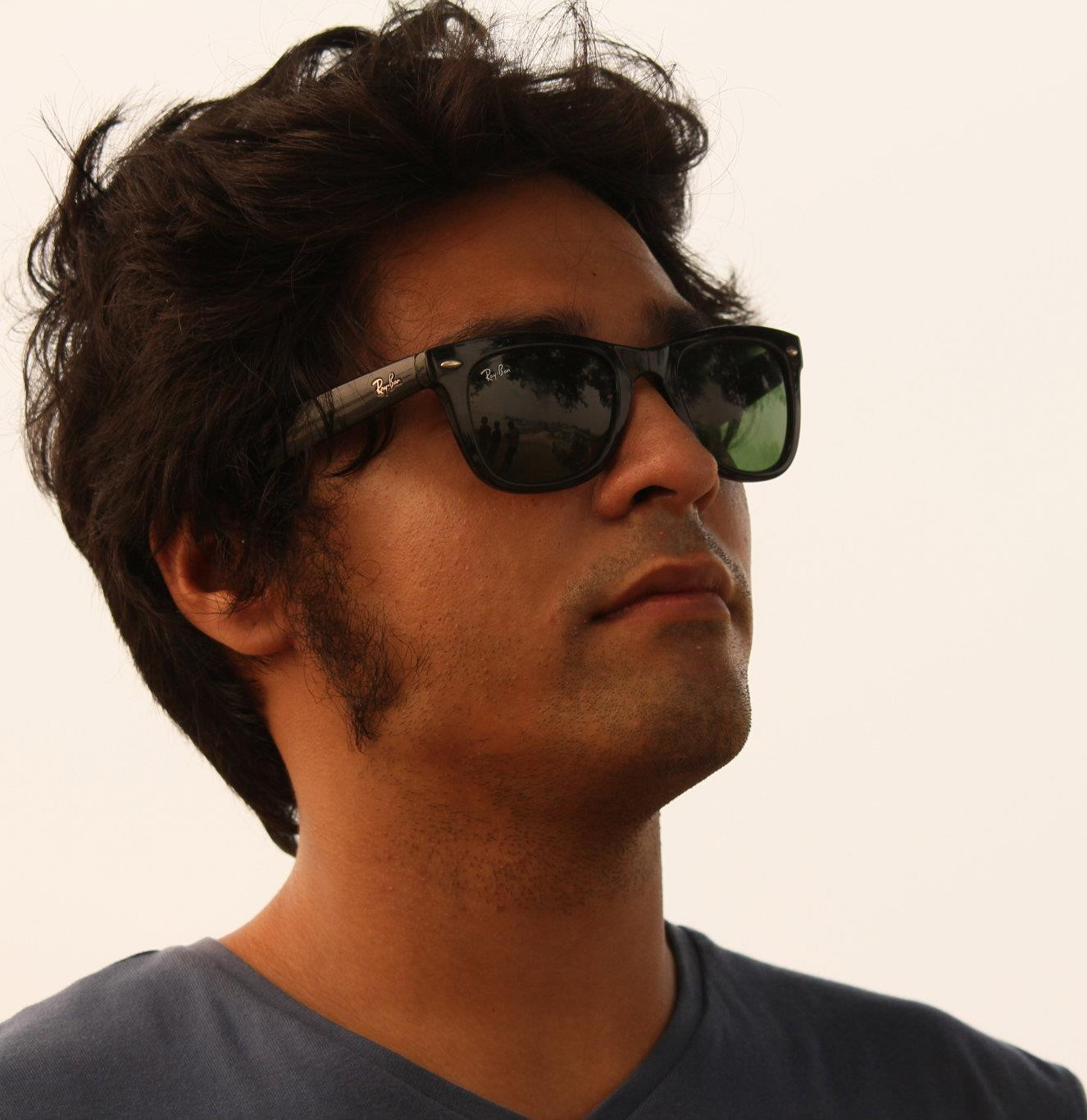
- Chatterjee in 2013
- Born: 15 June 1984 (age 42); Kolkata, West Bengal, India
- Occupation: Actor
- Spouse(s): Anindita Bose (m. 2013; div. 2015) Dr. Devlina Kumar (m. 2020)
- Father: Gautam Chatterjee
- Relatives: Uttam Kumar (grandfather)

Gourab Chatterjee is an Indian film and television actor based in Kolkata. He is the grandson of Uttam Kumar.

== Career ==
His debut film, Bhalobasar Onek Naam (2006), was directed by film director Tarun Majumdar and co-starred Soumitra Chatterjee and Moushumi Chatterjee.

== Filmography ==
=== Films ===
- Aamar Boss (2025)
- Oti Uttam (2024)
- Kojagori (Upcoming)
- Kirtan
- Mayaa
- Ghore Pherar Gaan
- Circus er Ghora
- Baba Baby O (2022)
- Ekti Bangali Alien-er Golpo (Zee Bangla Cinema Originals) (2021)
- Aloukik Obhijaan (Zee Bangla Cinema Originals) (2021)
- Ke Tumi Nandini (2019)
- Pather Sesh Kothay (2012)
- Rang Milanti (2010)
- Eti (2008)
- Krishnakanter Will (2007)
- Bhalobasar Anek Naam (2006)

=== Television ===
- Durga as Rupam (Star Jalsha) (2008–2010)
- Ghore Pherar Gaan as Rick Banerjee (Star Jalsha) (2012–2013)
- Bodhuboron as Satyaki Chowdhury (Star Jalsha) (2013–2017)
- Adorini as Rayan Sen (Star Jalsha) (2017–2018)
- Karunamoyee Rani Rashmoni as Mathuramohan Biswas Zee Bangla (2018–2021)
- Lockdown Diary – Honeymoon (Zee Bangla) (2020)
- Mahapeeth Tarapeeth as Rabindranath Tagore (Star Jalsha) (2021)
- Gaatchora as Riddhiman Singha Roy (Star Jalsha) (2021–2023)
- Tentulpata as Rishiraj "Rishi" Singha Roy (Star Jalsha) (2024-2025)
- Milon Hobe Koto Dine as Gora Sen (Star Jalsha) (2025–2026)

=== Web series ===
- Charitraheen (29 September 2018)
- Do Not Disturb (8 December 2018)
- Shei je Holud Pakhi(2018)
- Bou Keno Psycho (21 February 2019)
- Bonno Premer Golpo (2020)
- Shei je Holud Pakhi-Season 2(2021)
