= Dadar Kirti =

- Directed by: / Tarun Majumdar
- Story by: Sharadindu Bandyopadhyay
- Starring: Tapas Paul; Mahua Roychoudhury; Sandhya Roy; Debashree Roy; Kali Banerjee; Kaushik Banerjee; Ruma Guha Thakurta; Anup Kumar
- Cinematography: Shakti Banerjee
- Edited by: Ramesh Joshi, Shakti Pada Roy
- Music by: Hemanta Mukherjee
- Release date: 1980
- Running time: 154 minutes
- Country: India
- Language: Bengali

Dadar Kirti (Bengali: দাদার কীর্তি; lit. 'Deeds of my elder brother') is a 1980 Bengali romantic drama film directed by Tarun Majumdar. The film was based on an unpublished novel of the same name by Saradindu Bandopadhyay. It stars Tapas Paul, Mahua Roychoudhury, Ayan Banerjee, Debashree Roy, Sandhya Roy, Kali Banerjee, Ruma Guha Thakurta and Anup Kumar. The film marks the debut of Tapas Paul.

The film was a huge box-office success and still has a popular following.

== Cast ==
- Tapas Paul as Kedar a.k.a. Phulda
- Mahua Roychoudhury as Saraswati
- Debashree Roy as Beena
- Ayan Banerjee as Santu
- Anup Kumar as Bhombolda (Head of Chandobani club)
- Satya Bandyopadhyay as Santu's father
- Kali Banerjee as Saraswati and Beena's father
- Sandhya Roy as Santu's boudi
- Ruma Guha Thakurta as Saraswati and Beena's mother
- Sulata Chowdhury as Phulmatia (Maid at Saraswati's house)
- Haradhan Banerjee as Kedar's father (guest)
- Kaushik Banerjee as Amarnath (rich boy from Bhagalpur) (guest)
- Shamit Bhanja as Santu's elder brother (guest)
- Monu Mukherjee as doctor (guest)
- Nimu Bhowmik
- Shakti Thakur as Santu's friend (Stammer boy of the Chandobani club)
- Sonali Chakraborty

== Crew ==
- Direction: Tarun Majumdar
- Production: Ram Cine Arts
- Producer: Ram Gupta
- Production Controller: Ishwar Lal Sharma
- Production Controller Assistants: Savitri Das
- Story: Sharadindu Bandyopadhyay
- Screenplay: Tarun Majumdar
- Cinematography: Shakti Bannerjee
- Music: Hemanta Mukherjee
- Editing: Ramesh Joshi, Shaktipada Roy
- Art Direction: Suresh Chandra Chandra
- Audiography: Anil Dasgupta, Jyoti Chatterjee, Somesh Chatterjee, Amulya Das

== Music ==
The music director of the film is Hemanta Mukherjee. The film has many uses of Rabindra Sangeet such as Charana Dharite, Ei korechho bhalo and also Bodhu Kon Alo Laaglo Chokhe, Guru Guru Guru Guru Ghono Megho which was the part of the play 'Chitrangada' in the movie. There was also a song which was originally written by Saradindu Bandopadhyay himself titled as Janam Abdhi. The music of the film was a huge hit upon release and is still popular today.

Dadar Kirti

Soundtrack album by Hemanta Mukherjee

All lyrics are written by Rabindranath Tagore, Pulak Bandyopadhyay, Sharadindu Bandyopadhyay and Hridayesh Pandey; all music is composed by Hemanta Mukherjee.

Songs
No.	Title	Playback	Length
1.	"Badhu Kon Alo (1)"	Arundhati Holme Chowdhury	4:11
2.	"Badhu Kon Alo (2)"	Arundhati Holme Chowdhury	4:00
3.	"Chorono Dhorite"	Arundhati Holme Chowdhury	4:26
4.	"Chorono Dhorite"	Hemanta Mukherjee	4:26
5.	"Ei Korechho Bhalo"	Hemanta Mukherjee	5:32
6.	"Eso Pranbharan"	Arundhati Holme Chowdhury and Bitu Samajpati	3:01
7.	"Janam Abdhi"	Manna Dey	3:55
8.	"Saat Suron Ki"	Hemanta Mukherjee, Shakti Thakur	5:21
9.	"Tomar Dake Sara Dite"	Aarti Mukherjee	3:07
