= Balika Badhu (1967 film) =

1967 Bengali film

- Directed by: Tarun Mazumdar
- Story by: Bimal Kar
- Starring: Moushumi Chatterjee; Rabi Ghosh; Anup Kumar; Ruma Guha Thakurta
- Cinematography: Soumendu Roy
- Release date: June 1, 1967
- Running time: 130 mins
- Country: India
- Language: Bengali

Balika Badhu is a 1967 Bengali romantic film, starring Moushumi Chatterjee as the title character. It was directed by Tarun Majumdar. The film is based on the novel of the same name by Bimal Kar. The film was remade in Hindi in 1976, which was also directed by Majumdar.

== Plot ==
The movie is about child marriage, a custom that was prevalent amongst various Indian societies. Set during British Raj in India, the movie tells the story of a village schoolboy Amal, who is married to a younger girl named Rajni. Left together for a few days, as a part of the ritual of childhood marriage, the two develop friendship and love. Rajni must soon return to her parents’ house, while Amal continues with his studies at home with Masterji, an elderly teacher. His life is enlivened occasionally when Rajni is permitted to visit.

Though Rajni's next visit is scheduled for Durga Puja, she fails to make it. Instead, she arrives during Vijayadashami, to stay for a couple of nights, before going on a proposed, long pilgrimage with her family. However, the British Police arrest Masterji for being a "freedom fighter", harboring and training fugitives, and making explosives. How this incident affects Amal and Rajni forms the rest of the story.

== Cast ==
- Moushumi Chatterjee as Rajani
- Partho Mukherjee as Amal
- Juin Banerjee as Chandraa; Amal's sister
- Anup Kumar as a sharat, Chandraa's husband; Amal's brother-in-law
- Satya Bandyopadhyay as Shashadhar Sinha; Amal's father
- Anubha Gupta
- Santosh Bandyopadhyay as Amal's home tutor
- Prasad Mukherjee
- Ruma Guha Thakurta
- Bankim Ghosh
- Rabi Ghosh as a special appearance in the song "Suk Bole Keno Shari"
- Sandhya Roy as a special appearance in the song "Suk Bole Keno Shari"
- Soumitra Chatterjee as voice of adult Amal

== Track listing ==
All music is composed by Hemanta Mukherjee.

No.	Title	Writer(s)	Playback Singer(s)	Length
1.	"Aaji Esechhi Aaji Esechhi" (Composition by Dwijendralal Ray)	Dwijendralal Ray	Robin Banerjee
2.	"Aami Kusum Tuliya"	Gauriprasanna Mazumder	Bani Dasgupta, Hemanta Mukherjee
3.	"Bhajo Gaurango Kaho Gaurango"	Traditional Song	Hemanta Mukherjee
4.	"Chhere Dao Reshmi Churi"	Mukunda Das	Sabitabrata Dutta
5.	"Lag Lag Ranger Bhelki"	Gauriprasanna Mazumder	Hemanta Mukherjee
6.	"Malay Asiya Koye Gechhe" (Composition by Dwijendralal Ray)	Dwijendralal Ray	Robin Banerjee
7.	"Suk Bole Keno Shari"	Gauriprasanna Mazumder	Hemanta Mukherjee, Bela Mukherjee

== Awards ==
- Filmfare Awards East in 1967.
