= Nimantran =

- Directed by: Tarun Majumdar
- Written by: Bibhutibhushan Bandyopadhyay (original story), Tarun Majumdar (screenplay)
- Starring: Sandhya Roy, Anup Kumar, Nandini Maliya
- Cinematography: Shakti Banerjee
- Edited by: Dulal Dutta
- Music by: Hemanta Mukherjee
- Release date: 21 May 1971
- Country: India
- Language: Bengali

Nimantran (transl. The invitation) is a 1971 Bengali film directed by Tarun Majumdar, based on a story by Bibhutibhushan Bandyopadhyay, and starring Sandhya Roy and Anup Kumar in the lead roles. At the 19th National Film Awards, it won the National Film Award for Best Feature Film in Bengali.

== Synopsis ==
The film tells the story of two people who fall in love, are separated, and meet again many years later. Hirendranath or Hiru (Anup Kumar), a young man from Calcutta, goes to visit his aunt in her village. There he meets Kumudini or Kumu (Sandhya Roy), a simple girl who has lost her father and lives with her uncle. Gradually, Hiru and Kumu get close, but marriage is denied by Kumu's uncle. Hiru returns to the city with a heavy heart, and gets a job in the railways in Jamalpur. There the boiler inspector becomes very fond of him. After an accident, the boiler inspector, on his deathbed, requests Hiru to marry his daughter Surama. They get married. However, Surama is ambitious and not satisfied with their financial and social status. Subsequently, Hiru quits his job, starts a business and becomes a successful man. However, he cannot give time and attention to his wife. Despite being a financially rich couple, both Hiru and Surama feel alone.

One day, Hiru's aunt writes to him many years after his first visit. He goes to the village and discovers that Kumu is now married, but that her husband does not care for her. Old feelings are rekindled in both of them. However, they cannot go against social customs.

== Cast ==
- Sandhya Roy as Kumi/Kumudini
- Anup Kumar as Hiru/Hirendranath Ganguly
- Nandini Maliya as Suro
- Kali Bannerjee as Dayal Dutta/village postmaster
- Pahari Sanyal as Suro's father
- Jahor Roy as village doctor
- Haridhan Mukherjee as Ghatak
- Sandhya Rani as Kumudini's mother
- Gyanesh Mukherjee as the boatman
- Ajit Banerjee as Hiru's uncle
- Aparna Debi as Hiru's mother
- Arun Mukherjee as the doctor(Hiru's friend)

== Crew ==
- Direction -- Tarun Majumdar
- Music-- Hemanta Mukherjee
- Cinematography—Shakti Banerjee
- Editing—Dulal Dutta

== Music ==
All songs composed by Hemanta Mukherjee (except Dure Kothay, a Rabindra Sangeet). The songs are:

1. Amar Dukhe Dukhe (sung by Nirmalendu Chowdhury, Banashree Sengupta)

2. Ami Bondhur Premagune Pora (sung by Nirmalendu Chowdhury)

3. Chyang Dhore Byang (sung by Anup Ghoshal, Geeta Chowdhury and chorus)

4. Dure Kothay (sung by Kanika Banerjee)

5. Peeriti Boliya Ekti Kamal (sung by Hemanta Mukherjee and chorus)

6. Tara Ma Mago Tara, Singhaprishthe Bhar Koriye (sung by Hemanta Mukherjee)

== Reception ==
When released, the film received both commercial and critical success. It not only won the National Film Award for Best Feature Film in Bengali, but also won a number of BFJA Awards, including Best Indian Films (along with others). It continues to be popular, as shown by its availability in DVD form in multiple distributions. The songs of the film, sung by Hemanta Mukherjee (who won a National Award for Nimantran), Kanika Bandyopadhyay and others, remain popular.

== Preservation ==
Nimantran has been restored and digitised by the National Film Archives of India.

== Awards ==
- National Film Award for Best Feature Film in Bengali
- National Film Awards; Best Playback Singer (Male) -- Hemanta Mukherjee
- BFJA Awards 1972:
  - Best Actress - Sandhya Roy
  - Best Cinematography (Black And White) - Shakti Banerjee
  - Best Director - Tarun Majumdar
  - Best Indian Films
- International Film Festival of India for Special Screening, 2022.
- Hyderabad Bengali Film Festival, Special Screening in 2018.
