= Eti (film) =

- Directed by: Sambit Nag
- Produced by: Sumana Mukherjee
- Starring: Gourab Chatterjee; Roopali Ganguly
- Edited by: Snehasish Ganguly
- Release date: 30 May 2008
- Running time: 120 minutes
- Country: India
- Language: Bengali

Eti (Bengali: ইতি) is a 2008 Bengali film directed by Sambit Nag.

== Plot ==
Sanjoy is in love with Shreya.Together with a group of friends they go on a trip to Darjeeling.

== Cast ==
- Gourab Chatterjee – Sanjay
- Roopali Ganguly – Shreya
- Bhaswar Chattopadhyay – Dipu
- Sudip Mukhopadhyay – Shreya's Elder Brother
- Papiya Sen
- Manajit Boral
- Sweta Tewari – Paramita
- Swaralipi Chatterjee – Ananya
- Dhruv Mukherjee
- Faiz Khan – Artist
- Pradip Mukhopadhyay – Shreya's Father

== Production ==
Gourab Chatterjeet indicated in an interview that he identified very much with his character: ”Sanjay, a college-goer like I am in real life. He is fun-loving and full of energy. Sanjay goes to Darjeeling on a vacation with friends, where he gets intimate with his girlfriend and then gets entangled in an MMS scandal. I could relate to it even more because Sanjay is a student of St Paul’s School in Darjeeling, where I studied.”

== Reception ==
A negative review wrote: ”Eti does not break any new ground in filmmaking, nor does it try to get to the core issue of voyeurism, pornography and their social impact. A little more sensitivity and a lot more depth was needed to mirror the flip side of technology and the impact it has on its victims.”
