= Balika Badhu (1976 film) =

- Directed by: Tarun Majumdar
- Written by: Shabd Kumar (dialogue)
- Screenplay by: Tarun Majumdar
- Story by: Bimal Kar
- Based on: Balika Badhu (1967)
- Produced by: Shakti Samanta
- Starring: Sachin; Rajni Sharma; Asrani; A. K. Hangal
- Cinematography: Nando Bhattacharya
- Edited by: Bijoy Chowdhary
- Music by: R. D. Burman
- Release date: 20 August 1976
- Country: India
- Language: Hindi

Balika Badhu (translation: Child Bride) is a 1976 Hindi romantic comedy-drama film produced by Shakti Samanta and directed by Tarun Majumdar. The film is based on the Bengali novel of the same name by Bimal Kar, about a young girl who is married before she is old enough to understand what marriage is all about, against the backdrop of the Indian freedom struggle. Gradually she and her school-going husband grow as a couple and begin to love one another. The novel was previously made into a Bengali film, Balika Badhu (1967), which was also directed by Majumdar.

This romantic comedy drama stars Sachin with Rajni Sharma, Asrani, A. K. Hangal, Asit Sen, Paintal and Om Shivpuri. Initially Debashree Roy was offered to play the title role but Majumdar later considered her to be imperfect to play the role and she got replaced by Rajni Sharma. The music is by R. D. Burman and lyrics by Anand Bakshi, who penned several hits in the film including "Bade Achchhe Lagte Hain...", which was singer Amit Kumar's first hit, and featured on the Binaca Geetmala annual list 1977 at # 26. It was the second film of Mrityunjay Sil.

== Cast ==
- Rajni Sharma as Rajni
- Sachin as Amal
- Mrityunjay Sil as Rahul
- Asrani as Sharat
- A. K. Hangal as master
- Prema Narayan as Radhiya
- Om Shivpuri as Amal's father
- Urmila Bhatt as Amal's mother
- Kajri as Chandra, Amal's sister
- Paintal as Shambhu
- Asit Sen as Udasu
- Preeti Ganguli as Nandini
- S. N. Banerjee as Pandit
- Birbal as an imported bangle seller
- Polson as School teacher
- Ashok Kumar as aged Amal's voice
- Amitabh Bachchan as adult Amal's voice
- Zeenat Aman as adult Rajni's voice
- Leela Mishra as granny

== Music ==
- Song "Bade Achhe Lagte Hain" was Amit Kumar's first hit song and listed at #26 on the Binaca Geetmala annual list 1977.

All lyrics are written by Anand Bakshi; all music is composed by Rahul Dev Burman.

Songs
No.	Title	Playback	Length
1.	"Aao Re Aao Khelo Holi Brij Mein"	Sapan Chakraborty	4:10
2.	"Bade Achhe Lagte Hain"	Amit Kumar, Rahul Dev Burman	5:09
3.	"Doli Mein Sawaar Sajnee Ka Pyaar"	Rahul Dev Burman	4:27
4.	"Jagat Musafir Khana"	Bhupinder	4:36
5.	"O Jhumke Wale"	Kishore Kumar, Asha Bhosle	4:29
6.	"Yeh Choodiyan Nahin"	Mohammad Rafi	5:00

== Awards ==
24th Filmfare Awards:

Won

- Best Supporting Actress – Kajari
- Best Comedian – Asrani
- Best Editing – Bijoy Chowdhury
