= Alor Pipasa =

Alor Pipasa is a Bengali drama film directed by Tarun Majumder and produced by Debesh Ghosh based on a novel named "Agniswar" of Balai Chand Mukhopadhyay. This film was released on 15 January 1965 under the banner of D.R. Productions. Music of the movie was done by Hemanta Mukherjee.

== Plot ==
This is the story of Roshnibai, a prostitute. When her past is exposed, she hides her identity to keep her child safe and sacrifices her life for him. A senior doctor narrates the heart touching story of Roshni's struggle to a junior doctor who is actually the son of Roshnibai.

== Cast ==
- Pahadi Sanyal as Doctor
- Basanta Choudhury
- Asit Baran as Partha
- Anup Kumar as Sohan Lal
- Sandhya Roy as Roshnibai
- Bhanu Bandopadhyay
- Anubha Gupta as Nila
- Jahor Roy as Dashu
- Satindra Bhattacharya
- Asha Devi
- Bhanu Ghosh
- Mani Srimani
- Sabita Sinha
- Sunit Mukherjee

== Soundtrack ==
- "Minati Mor Tomar Paaye" - Sandhya Mukhopadhyay
- "Kaschitkanta Biraha Guruna" - Hemant Kumar, Anuradha Ghosh
- "Abke Sawan Ghar Aaja" - Rajesh Kumari
- "Balam Matware" - Rajesh Kumari
- "Ghir Aai Badariya" - Lata Mangeshkar
- "Aaja Piya" - Sandhya Mukhopadhyay
- "Na Bajaiho Shyam Bairi Bansuri" - Lata Mangeshkar
- "Bidyudwantang Lalita Banita" -Hemant Kumar
- "Shrinnante Vishwe Amitatsya Putra" - Hemant Kumar
