= Rahgir =

- Directed by: Tarun Majumdar
- Written by: Manoj Basu
- Music by: Hemant Kumar
- Production company: Geetanjali Pictures
- Release date: 1969
- Country: India
- Language: Hindi

Rahgir (The Traveler) is a Bollywood romantic social drama film. It was released in 1969 and directed by Tarun Majumdar. The film was produced by Geetanjali Pictures and had music by Hemant Kumar. A remake of Majumdar's own 1963 Bengali film Palatak, which itself is based on Manoj Basu's novel Angti Chattujjer Vai, the film had Biswajeet playing the central role of Rahgir where his acting "attracted attention". Costarring with Biswajeet were Sandhya Roy, Shashikala, Kanhaiyalal, Iftekhar, Nirupa Roy and Asit Sen. The story is about Biswajeet playing an impetuous young man in search "for the meaning of life" and is regarded as one of his most credible performances.

== Cast ==
- Biswajeet
- Sandhya Roy
- Shashikala
- Kanhaiyalal
- Iftekhar
- Nirupa Roy
- Asit Sen
- Padma
- Vasant Choudhary

== Music ==
The music was composed by Hemant Kumar with lyrics written by Gulzar. The singers were Lata Mangeshkar, Kishore Kumar, Manna Dey, Hemant Kumar, Asha Bhosle, Usha Mangeshkar, Sulakshana Pandit and Aarti Mukherji.

=== Song list ===
| # | Title | Singer |
|---|---|---|
| 1 | "Tumhare Nain Dekh Ke Suna Log Jogi Ho Gaye" | Hemant Kumar |
| 2 | "Kabhi Ruk Gaye Hai" | Hemant Kumar |
| 3 | "Janam Se Banjara Hu Bandu" | Hemant Kumar |
| 4 | "Mitwa Re Bhool Gaye Thay Rahein" | Lata Mangeshkar |
| 5 | "Bairi Anchar Pag Pag Uljhe" | Lata Mangeshkar |
| 6 | "Do Do Pankh Laga Ke Panchi Banein Ge" | Aarti Mukherjee |
| 7 | "Babu Ghabrate Hai" | Kishore Kumar, Asha Bhosle |
| 8 | "Panchhi Re Udde Gagan Gagan Mast Magan" | Sulakshana Pandit, Hemant Kumar, Manna Dey |
| 9 | "Baid Ke Palle Pade Kaise Baid" | Kishore Kumar |
| 10 | "Daiya Kasam Sharam Sharam Laage" | Asha Bhosle, Usha Mangeshkar |

== Awards ==
The film won the following awards at BFJA.

- BFJA Awards for Best Supporting Actress (Hindi) Shashikala
- Best Art Direction Robi Chattopadhyay
- Best Choreography Kanai Dey
- Best Indian Films
