= Bhalobasar Onek Naam =

2006 Bengali film

Bhalobasar Onek Naam is a 2006 Bengali romantic drama film directed by Tarun Majumdar based on a short story by Bibhutibhushan Bandopadhyay. Released under the banner of Aladain Entertainment, this was the debut movie for both Gourab Chatterjee and Megha Mukherjee, grandson of Uttam Kumar and granddaughter of Hemanta Mukherjee, respectively.

== Plot ==
Bimal, a young man comes to Bataspur village as a school teacher. All the villagers, specially ticket collector Kailash, and a school teacher Manirul love him a lot. He befriends Bini, a housewife who resembles his elder sister. But few people think that they have an illicit love affairs. Actually, Bimal likes Bini's sister Sumi. On the other hand local station master Shashi tries to fix his daughter Bulbuli's marriage with Bimal. One day Bimal's cousin comes to Bilaspur offering a better job for him but Bimal refuses to leave the village due to immense love and affections. He marries Sumi and stays at Bataspur.

== Cast ==
- Gourab Chatterjee as Bimal Mukherjee
- Soumitra Chatterjee as Manirul
- Paran Banerjee as Kailash
- Moushumi Chatterjee as Bini
- Megha Mukherjee as Sumi
- Manoj Mitra as Shashi
- Tapas Pal as Bini's husband
- Biplab Chatterjee
- Pijush Ganguly as Bimal's cousin
- Biplabketan Chakraborty as Nakul
- Biswajit Chakraborty as Sadananda Das
