= Fuleswari =

1974 Bengali romance drama film directed by Tarun Majumdar

Fuleswari is a Bengali romance drama film directed by Tarun Majumdar based on a story of Bibhutibhushan Mukhopadhyay and produced by Kartik Chandra Barman. The film was released on 3 May 1974 under the banner of Radharani Pictures. Hemanta Mukhopadhyay was the music director of the film.

== Plot ==
Fuleswari, a young village woman, falls in love with Brindaban, a mysterious newcomer who arrives in her village. While she plans to marry him, she faces a moral dilemma upon discovering that Brindaban is entangled in a life of crime.

== Cast ==
- Sandhya Roy as Fuleswari
- Samit Bhanja as Brindaban
- Utpal Dutt
- Rabi Ghosh
- Anup Kumar
- Tarun Kumar
- Lily Chakravarty
- Sulata Chowdhury
- Molina Devi
- Gita Dey
- Ashim Chakraborty

== Music ==
The music director of this film was Hemanta Mukherjee. The lyrics of the songs were penned by Mukul Dutt, Pulak Bandyopadhyay, Arnab Mazumder and Tarun Majumdar. The film contains total twelve songs. These songs are:

1. Ami Dekhte Bhalobasi - sung by Hemanta Mukherjee
2. Jeyo Na, Darao Bandhu - sung by Hemanta Mukherjee
3. Fuleswari Fuleswari - sung by Hemanta Mukherjee
4. Shuno Shuno Mahasay - sung by Manna Dey and chorus
5. Tapur Tupur Brishti Jhore - sung by Hemanta Mukherjee
6. Ami Tomay Baro Bhalobasi - sung by Haridhan Mukherjee
7. Ami Tomay Koto Khujilam - sung by Hemanta Mukherjee
8. Hay Hay Hay Hay - sung by Sandhya Mukherjee, Aarti Mukherjee and chorus
9. Tumi Shatadal Hoye - sung by Hemanta Mukherjee
10. Shunun Shunun Babu Moshay - sung by Aarti Mukherjee
11. Shuno Shuno Mahasay (Reprise) - sung by Manna Dey and chorus
12. Hyade Go Padmarani - sung by Anup Ghoshal
