= Parashmoni =

1988 Bengali film

Parashmoni (lit. The Touchstone) is a 1988 Bengali film directed by Tarun Majumder.

== Reception ==
With this film, the director is said to have been "looking for the ’’utmost point of compromise" between the Hindi commercial style and pseudo - realism of the light variety’.
