= Palanka (film) =

- Directed by: Rajen Tarafdar
- Written by: Narendranath Mitra
- Starring: Utpal Dutt; Sandhya Roy; Anwar Hossain
- Cinematography: Sailaja Chatterjee
- Music by: Sudhin Dasgupta
- Distributed by: Anis Films (Bangladesh); D. S. Pictures (India)
- Release date: 7 November 1975
- Running time: 128 minutes
- Countries: India, Bangladesh
- Language: Bengali

Palanka (English: The Bedstead) is a 1975 Bengali drama film directed by Rajen Tarafdar based on a short story of Narendranath Mitra. It was an India-Bangladesh joint production under the banner of Film Art, with Utpal Dutt and Anwar Hossain in the lead roles. At the 23rd National Film Awards, India, it won the National Film Award for Best Feature Film in Bengali.

== Synopsis ==
The film is set in the period immediately following the Partition of India. Rajmohan (Utpal Dutt), a Hindu aristocrat, decides to stay on in East Bengal, which is now part of Pakistan, rather than migrate to India with his family members. His companion in the village is Maqbool (Anwar Hossain), a poor Muslim. Rajmohan's family faces financial hardship in Calcutta. His daughter-in-law writes to him to sell a bed and send her the money. The bed, a huge ornate four-poster bed, which is famous in the village for its size and the quality of its craftsmanship, had been part of her dowry. Rajmohan is annoyed by this, and on an impulse he decides to sell the bed to Maqbool, who makes space for it in his dilapidated hut. This leads to an uproar among the upper-class Muslims in the village, who accuse Maqbool of trying to go beyond his class. Rajmohan too regrets his impulsive decision and wants the bed back. To Maqbool however, the bed has come to be a symbol of his liberation from feudal bondage. He would rather go hungry than sell the bed back. The issue is finally resolved to the satisfaction of all.

== Cast ==
- Utpal Dutt—Rajmohan
- Anwar Hossain—Maqbool
- Sandhya Roy
- Amal Dey

== Crew ==
- Direction -- Rajen Tarafdar
- Music—Sudhin Dasgupta
- Cinematography—Sailaja Chatterjee (as Sailaja Chattopadhyay)
- Set design—S. A. Q. Moinuddin
- Playback Singers -- Manna Dey, Angshuman Roy
- Make-up—Noor Mohammad

== Reception ==
The film did not enjoy commercial success, but was critically well received at the time, winning one National Award and two BFJA Awards. According to one researcher, the film has now "faded into oblivion".

== Awards and honours ==
- 23rd National Film Awards, India (1975) -- National Film Award for Best Feature Film in Bengali
- BFJA Awards 1976—Best Indian film; Best Music (Sudhin Dasgupta)
- Selected for screening at the Fribourg Film Festival (2000) -- focus on Partition of Bengal

== Preservation ==
An almost complete copy of the movie is available in web.
