= Kheya =

Bengali poetry

Kheya (Bengali: খেয়া; English: 'Ferrying Across') is a Bengali-language book of poems written by Rabindranath Tagore. It was published in 1906. It deals with humanity's sorrows, aspirations and spirituality. It consists of 55 poems.

== Dedication ==
Tagore dedicated the book to the Indian scientist Jagdish Chandra Bose.
