= Shriman Prithviraj =

Srimaan Prithviraj
- DVD cover
- Directed by: Tarun Majumdar
- Starring: Mahua Roychoudhury; Ayan Banerjee; Utpal Dutt; Sandhya Roy; Biswajit Chatterjee; Rabi Ghosh
- Music by: Hemanta Mukherjee
- Release date: 1973
- Country: India
- Language: Bengali

Shriman Prithviraj (Bengali: শ্রীমান পৃথ্বীরাজ; transl. 'Mr. Prithviraj') is a 1973 Indian Bengali romantic comedy film starring Ayan Banerjee and Mahua Roy Choudhury, and directed by Tarun Majumdar, featuring teenage love. It has a cult following. This is essentially a comedy with Tom Sawyeresque leanings laced elegantly into the fabric of Bengal of the late 19th or early 20th century. In the subtle backdrop of the Indian freedom movement, it is the story of the transformation of a young boy's innocent but naughty childhood to an appreciation of the Swadeshi movement and the growth of adolescent love for a girl even younger than him. The comic appeal of the film is natural and free-flowing. It includes a number of beautifully rendered traditional Bengali songs and is punctuated by a series of stand-offs faced by the young boy, mostly with unfavourable results for the opposing party. At heart, it is a beautiful pre-pubescent/adolescent love story. It was a huge box-office success when it came out and still retains its popularity.

The leading cast are Ayan Banerjee and Mahua Roychoudhury as the teenage-couple and help to portray the blend of the pre-Independence political backdrop with the simple love life of the newlywed. On one hand there is the caricature of a typical Babu, who's hell-bent on getting the ‘Raibahadur’ title from the British rulers played excellently by Utpal Dutt, and on the other hand a Swadeshi played by Biswajit Chatterjee, who is out to teach the British rulers a lesson. The main focus is on Rashik Laal (Ayan), a notorious boy. To curb him, his parents get him married to Kamala (Mohua). But he creates havoc in his in-laws’ house as well. The interplay between the two, their becoming friends, missing each other, understanding their feelings for each other all make for a charming love story.

== Synopsis ==
Young Rashik Lal is a notorious brat and the entire village, including his father, is fed up with the boy. He is in love with the character 'Prithviraj' (Prithviraj Chauhan), a great warrior who he (falsely and somewhat comically) believes to have fought against Alexander the Great; and often fantasizes himself as Prithviraj. One day he has a fight with his classmate Anta and is suspended from school. His father gets him married thinking that marriage would bring stability and seriousness in his life. He is married to the daughter of an aristocratic babu, whose only desire is to achieve the title of 'Raibahadur'. Rashik is super excited after meeting Amala, his wife, as she can read and write and converse in English. However, this is short-lived and Rashik goes back to living his reckless life as a notorious brat. His father-in-law hires an Englishman to tutor him. However, the situation soon gets out of control which leads to a rift between the families of the newlywed groom and the bride. After much hassle and confusion, the couple is not only united but they also develop a strong bond of love and friendship.

== Cast ==
- Ayan Bandyopadhyay as Rashiklal Mukherjee
- Mahua Roychoudhury as Amalabala Mukherjee
- Biswajit Chatterjee as Akhil Mitra
- Sandhya Roy as Saratsashi Mitra
- Rabi Ghosh as Haridas
- Santosh Dutta as Rashik's school-teacher
- Utpal Dutt as Pannalal Roy Chowdhury
- Padma Devi as wife of Pannalal Roy Chowdhury
- Satya Bandyopadhyay as Banamali Mukherjee
- Chinmoy Roy as Pannalal's Car-driver
- Tapen Chatterjee as Pannalal's Servant
- Haridhan Mukhopadhyay as Banamali's Henchman
- Mohtasim Fuad Mahi as Joy

== Soundtrack ==
The film contains total six songs. All songs were composed by Hemanta Mukhopadhyay and written by Gauriprasanna Mazumder (except Sakhi Bhabona Kahare Bole, which was written and composed by Rabindranath Tagore). Kavita Krishnamurthy made her playback debut in this film. The songs are:

1. Haridaser Bulbul Bhaja (sung by Tarun Banerjee)

2. Tolpi Tolpa Niye Ebar (sung by Hemanta Mukhopadhyay)

3. Sakhi Bhabona Kahare Bole (sung by Lata Mangeshkar, Kavita Krishnamurthy)

4. Haridaser Bulbul Bhaja - Reprise (sung by Tarun Banerjee)

5. Aaji Basante (sung by Aarti Mukherjee)

6. Noro Dhame Sakhato Ishwar He (sung by Hemanta Mukhopadhyay and Tarun Banerjee)
