= Ganadevata (film) =

1978 Indian film

- Directed by: Tarun Majumdar
- Screenplay by: Tarun Majumdar; Rajen Tarafdar; Arnab Majumdar (dialogue)
- Based on: Ganadevata (1942) by Tarashankar Bandopadhyay
- Produced by: Department of Information and Cultural Affairs, Government of West Bengal
- Starring: Soumitra Chatterjee; Ajitesh Bannerjee; Samit Bhanja; Nilkantha Sengupta; Rabi Ghosh; Anup Kumar
- Cinematography: Shakti Banerjee
- Edited by: Ramesh Joshi
- Music by: Hemanta Mukherjee
- Release date: 29 June 1978 (India)
- Running time: 172 min.
- Country: India
- Language: Bengali

Ganadevata (transl. The People) is a 1978 Bengali drama film directed by Tarun Majumdar, based on a novel of the same name by Tarashankar Bandopadhyay. The film stars Soumitra Chatterjee, Ajitesh Bannerjee, Samit Bhanja, Rabi Ghosh and Anup Kumar in lead roles. The epic novel is set in the 1920s during the British Raj, about the breakdown of socio-economic structures, impact of industrialization and non-cooperation movement in rural Bengal. It also won its author, Bandopadhyay, the 1967 Jnanpith Award.

At the 26th National Film Awards (1978), it won the award for Best Popular Film Providing Wholesome Entertainment and Best Child Artist Award for Kanchan De Biswas.

== Cast ==
- Soumitra Chatterjee as Debu Pandit
- Sandhya Roy as Durga
- Tapen Chatterjee as Tara Napit
- Ajitesh Bandopadhyay as Chhiru Pal
- Samit Bhanja as Aniruddha kamar
- Nilkantha Sengupta as Tarini, the singer
- Rabi Ghosh as Haren Ghosal
- Anup Kumar as Patu bayen
- Santosh Dutta as Jagan Doctor & Social activist for the rural poor people
- Debraj Ray as Najarbandi babu aka Jatin
- Madhabi Mukherjee Padma, wife of aniruddha kamar
- Sumitra Mukherjee Bilu, Debu pandit's wife
- Monu Mukhopadhyay priest
- Anamika Saha dancer
- Santu Mukhopadhyay revolutionary
- Nimu Bhowmik police
- Kanchan Dey Bishwas as Uchchingre

== Music ==
The music of the film was composed by Hemanta Mukherjee. The lyrics were penned by Pulak Bandyopadhyay, Mukul Dutta, Tarashankar Bandopadhyay and Lt. Ganga Charan Sarkar. The songs are:

1. Bhor Hoilo Jagata Jagilo (sung by Manna Dey) 2. Bhalo Chhilo Sishubela (Sung by Sipra Bose) 3. Shone Re Boli (sung by Manna Dey) 4. Dekhe Ja Rey Dekhe Ja (sung by Hemanta Mukherjee and Aarti Mukherjee) 5. Ek Ghentu Tar Saat Beta (sung by Manna Dey) 6. Eso Poush Sonar Poush (Sung by chorus) 7. Lathi Kheye Aar Katodin (sung by Manna Dey)

== Reception ==
- Won the National Film Award for Best Popular Film Providing Wholesome Entertainment (1978)and Best Child Artist Award for Kanchan De Biswas.
- Filmfare Award Winner (1979) for Best actor Female Sandhya Roy (actress).
- BFJA Award Winner (1979) for Best Actress - Sandhya Roy
- Special Screening at Kolkata International Film Festival in 2022.
