= Bimal Kar =

Indian writer (1921–2003)

- Born: 19 September 1921; Taki, Bengal Presidency, British India
- Died: 26 August 2003 (aged 81); Bidhannagar, Kolkata, West Bengal, India
- Occupation: Novelist
- Writing career
- Notable work: Asamay
- Notable awards: Sahitya Akademi

Bimal Kar (19 September 1921 — 26 August 2003) was an Indian writer and novelist who wrote in Bengali. He received the 1975 Sahitya Akademi Award presented by the Sahitya Akademi, India's National Academy of Letters, for his novel Asamay.

== Personal life and education ==
Bimal Kar was born in Taki in the North 24 Parganas, in 1921. Bimal Kar had lived in various places in and around Bihar like Jabalpur, Hazaribagh, Gomoh and Dhanbad. He died on 26 August 2003.

== Career ==
Bimal Kar has written many Bengali classics. He also wrote dramas depicting society. The special ability of Kar was that he had many completely different narration styles and he has also written noteworthy ones almost entirely comprising dialogue. His mastery of the Western Bengal and Chhota Nagpur locales matched well his in-depth association with modern Calcutta.

He was involved in myriad professions that later helped him write on varied subjects. His writings reflect a modern mind and have inspired many young writers whom he also supported at the start of their literary careers. For children, He created the retired magician Kinkar Kishore Ray, alias Kikira who solved mysteries with his two assistants. He created another detective character called Victor.

After moving to Kolkata, Bimal Kar worked as a journalist with Parag, Paschimbanga and Satyajug.

From 1954 to 1982, he was associated with Desh where his novel Grahan was published in 1964. His novel Asamay won the Sahitya Akademi award in 1975. Kar won the Ananda Puraskar in 1967 and the Saratchandra Award from Calcutta University in 1981. He was also associated with were Shiladitya and Galpapatro magazine. He could win over the heart of the average reader of Bengali literature with his ability to craft characters and the fine art of storytelling. Many of his novels were made into films.

== Bibliography ==
=== Novels ===
- Deoyal
- Nim Fuler Gondho
- Kushilob
- Asamay
- Sannidho
- Dongson
- Khorkuto
- Moho
- Dwip
- Procchonno
- A Aboron
- Swapne
- Nirosro
- Osesh
- Mallica
- Granthi
- Balika Badhu

=== Works for younger audience ===
- Raboner Mukhosh (Ananda Pub.)
- Ekti Photo Churi'r Rahasya (Ananda Pub.)
- Neel Banorer Haar (Ananda Pub.)
- Aloukik (Ananda Pub.)
- Ekti Obhisopto Puthi o OstodhatU (Ananda Pub.)
- Pakhighar (Ananda Pub.)
- Bagher Thaba (Ananda Pub.)
- Kalbaishakhir Ratre
- Jadukorer Rahsyamoy Mreetyu (Ananda Pub.)
- Circus theke Palea (Ananda Pub.)
- Holud Palak Badha Teer (Ananda Pub.)
- Sudhananda Pretsidha o Kikira (Ananda Pub.)
- Harano Diarir Khoje (Ananda Pub.)
- Mondargarher Rahasyamay Jotsna (Ananda Pub.)
- Bhuler Phade Nabakumar (Ananda Pub.)
- Turuper Sesh Tash (Ananda Pub.)
- Sonar Gharir Khoje (Ananda Pub.)
- Haider Laner Tero Nombor Barir Coffin Baxo (Ananda Pub.)
- Gajopati Bhejitable Shoe Company (Ananda Pub.)
- Kishore Phire Esechilo (Ananda Pub.)
- Jhiler Dhare Ekdin (Ananda Pub.)
- Phuldani Club (Ananda Pub.)
- Sonali Saper Chobol (Ananda Pub.)
- Mayurganjer Nirshigosadan
- Doshti Kishore Uponyas (Ananda Pub.)
- Kikira Somogro (Vol 1-3) (Ananda Pub.)
- Swanirbachito Kishore Golpo (Punascha)
- Sisher Angti (Punascha)
- Ajab Desher Gajab Raja (Gangchil)
- Ek Bhoutik Malgari aar Guardsaheb (Srestha Bhuter Golpo, Tulikolom)

=== Pakhik Anandamela Golpo Sonkolon ===
- Magician
- Bhunikaka'r Chauroshtomh
- Keu Ki Esechilo
- Mojadar Ek Football Match aar Danapuri

=== PujaBarshiki Anandamela Golpo Sonkolon ===
- Bonobiral (Pujabarshiki Anandamela,1388)
- Ekti Bhuture Ghori

=== Doshti Kishore Uponyas ===
- Wondermama
- Gojopoti Vegetable Shoe Company
- Aloukik
- Siser Angti
- Harano Jeep er Rahasya
- Kisore Fire Esechilo
- Mondargor'er Rahasyamoy Jyotsna
- Harano Diary'r Khonje
- Kaalbaishakh'er Ratre
- Rabon'er Mukhosh

=== Drama ===
- Ghughu

=== Memoirs ===
- Uro Khoi (Vol 1 & 2)

=== Cinema ===
He also has to his credit several novels that were successfully adapted for the screen. These include the classic comedy, Basanta-Bilap, Balika Badhu (1967) aka The Young Wife (International: English title), later remade in Hindi as Balika Badhu (1976), Jadubangsha and Chhuti (1967) (based on his novel, Khar-Kuto), Dillagi (1978) aka Mischief (International: English title), Bonobhumi.
