= Prafulla =

Prafulla is a given name. Notable people with the name include:

- Prafulla Chaki (1888–1908), Bengali revolutionary associated with the Jugantar group
- Prafulla Chandra Ghosh (1891–1983), the first Chief Minister of West Bengal, India
- Prafulla Chandra Roy, Bengali academic, a chemist and entrepreneur
- Prafulla Chandra Sen (1897–1990), Bengali Indian politician and freedom fighter
- Prafulla Dahanukar (born 1934), award-winning Indian painter
- Prafulla Kumar Das, Chief Minister of Tripura state, India from 1 April to 25 July 1977
- Prafulla Kumar Mahanta (born 1952), leader of the Assam Movement, a former Chief Minister of Assam
- Prafulla Roy (1934–2025), Indian writer
- Prafulla Kumar Sen, Indian revolutionary and philosopher

== See also ==
- Acharya Prafulla Chandra College, co-educational Government sponsored degree college in West Bengal
