= Kuheli =

- Poster of the film
- Directed by: Tarun Majumdar
- Screenplay by: Tarun Majumdar
- Story by: Biren Das
- Produced by: Bharat Chitra
- Starring: Biswajit Chatterjee; Sandhya Roy; Sumita Sanyal; Debashree Roy; Chhaya Devi; Ajitesh Bandopadhyay; Satya Bandyopadhyay; Shekhar Chatterjee; Rabi Ghosh; Utpal Dutta; Subhendu Chatterjee
- Release date: 1971
- Running time: 129 Minutes
- Country: India
- Language: Bengali

Kuheli (Bengali: কুহেলী) is a 1971 Bengali psychological thriller film directed by Tarun Majumdar. The film stars Biswajit Chatterjee, Sandhya Roy, Sumita Sanyal, Debashree Roy, Chhaya Devi, Ajitesh Bandopadhyay, Satya Bandyopadhyay, Shekhar Chatterjee, Utpal Dutt, Rabi Ghosh and Subhendu Chatterjee. Music director of the movie was Hemanta Mukherjee.

== Plot ==
A woman, Sheba Mitra, comes to a remote hill town, Nijhumgarh, to be the governess of a girl, Ranu. Shankar Roy is the owner of the almost haunted bungalow called Raykuthi. Ranu is his only child. Sheba realises there is something mysterious in her new surroundings. She tries to learn the history of the bungalow and the dwellers and investigates secretly. Old family friend Dr. Choudhury and Shankar's cousin Satyabhusan were much related with the family. Sheba suddenly gets to know that two murders had taken place there nearly seven years earlier. She saw mysterious incidents happen. A lady resembling Shankar's deceased wife Aparna sings and walks in the adjacent jungle almost every night to attract the girl child and his father Shankar. Sheba could only pray for it to leave as the rules of the physical world are transcended. It is revealed that the main culprit is someone close to and trusted by the family.

== Cast ==
- Biswajit Chatterjee as Shankar Roy
- Sandhya Roy as Aparna, Shankar's wife/ Suparna, Aparna's twin sister
- Sumita Sanyal as Sheba Mitra
- Debashree Roy as Ranu, the daughter of Shankar and Aparna
- Chhaya Devi as Manada di
- Ajitesh Bandopadhyay as Satyabhusan
- Satya Bandyopadhyay as Dr. Choudhury
- Shekhar Chatterjee as the station master
- Utpal Dutt as the lawyer
- Tarun Roy
- Rabi Ghosh as Lakkhan, the old spy servant of the family
- Subhendu Chatterjee
- Mrinal Mukherjee
- Nirmal Ghosh

== Soundtrack ==
The soundtrack is composed by Hemanta Mukherjee.

Song	Singer
Megher Kole Rod Heseche	Asha Bhosle
Ke Jege Aacho	Lata Mangeshkar
Keno Ele	Lata Mangeshkar
Tumi Robe Nirobe	Hemanta Mukherjee, Lata Mangeshkar
Eso Kache Eso	Lata Mangeshkar
Aparna	Kazi Sabyasachi
