= Tarun Majumdar =

Indian film director (1931–2022)

Padma Shri Tarun Majumdar
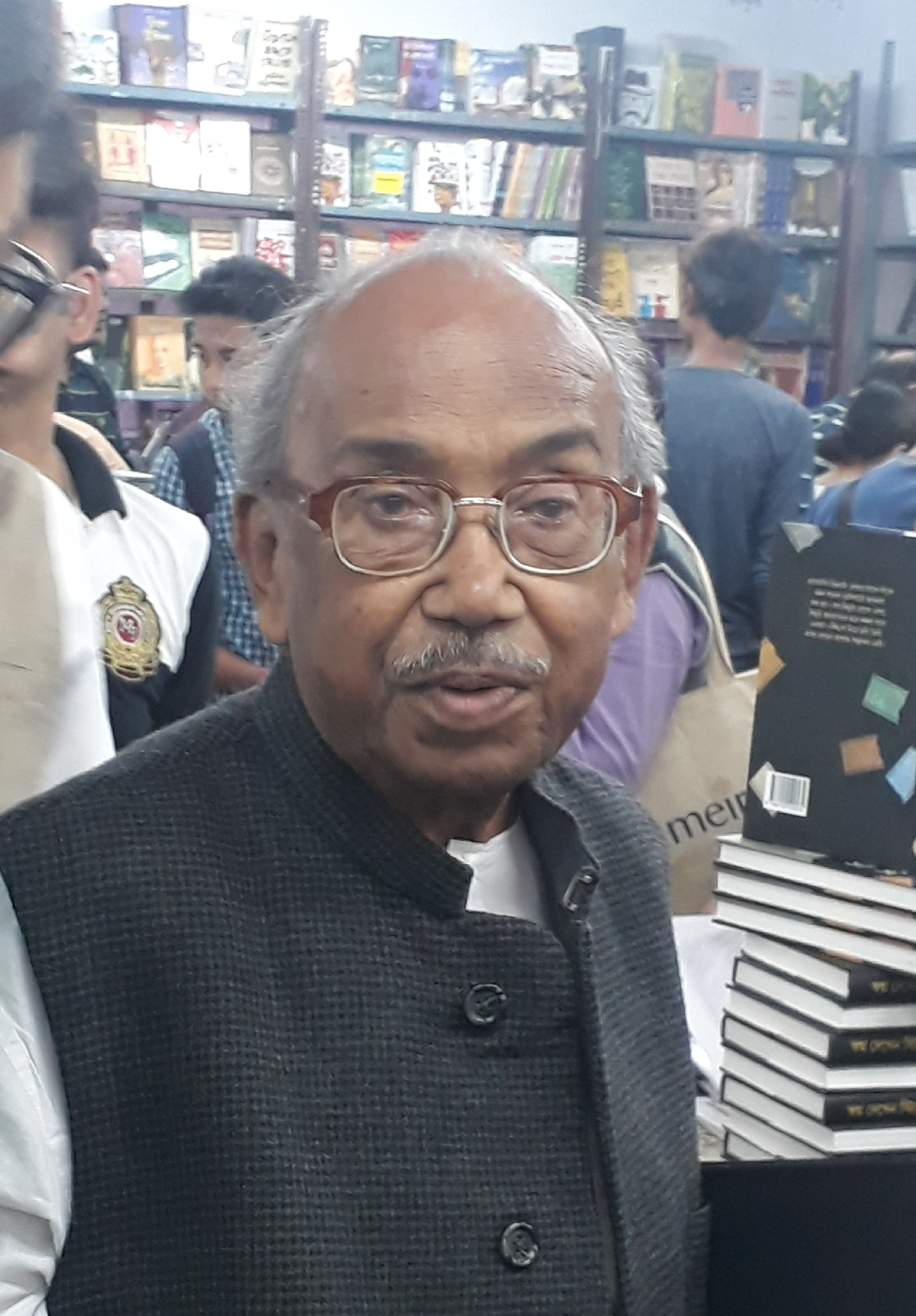
- Majumdar at the Kolkata Book Fair, 2018
- Born: 8 January 1931; BograBangladesh , Bengal Presidency, British India
- Died: 4 July 2022 (aged 91); Kolkata, West Bengal, India
- Education: St. Paul's Cathedral Mission School; Scottish Church College; University of Calcutta
- Occupation: Film director
- Years active: 1959–2018
- Spouse: Sandhya Roy
- Awards: Padma Shri; National Award; BFJA Award; Filmfare Award; Anandalok Award

Tarun Majumdar (8 January 1931 – 4 July 2022) was an Indian film director, documentary filmmaker, author, illustrator, and screenwriter known for his work in Bengali cinema. He received five National Film Awards, seven BFJA Awards, five Filmfare Awards, and one Anandalok Award. In 1990, the Government of India awarded him the Padma Shri, the fourth-highest civilian award in the country. The National Film Archive of India has restored and digitized several of his works, including Nimantran (1971), which earned him a National Award, a BFJA Award and a Filmfare Award. Ganadevata (1978) earned him a National Award and a Filmfare Award.

His filmography includes: Balika Badhu (1967), Kuheli (1971), Shriman Prithviraj (1973), Fuleswari (1974), Dadar Kirti (1980), Bhalobasa Bhalobasa (1985), and Apan Amar Apan (1990).

== Personal life ==
=== Early life ===
Majumdar was born on 8 January 1931 in Bogra, which was then part of the Bengal Presidency of British India. His father, Birendranath Majumdar, was a freedom fighter from Munsirhat. He studied intermediate from St. Paul's Cathedral Mission College and had his graduation at Scottish Church College, both affiliated with the University of Calcutta.

=== Marriage ===
Majumdar married actress Sandhya Roy in 1967. While the couple later separated, they remained legally married until his death.

=== Death ===
On 4 July 2022, at the age of 91, Majumdar died of a heart attack at a hospital in Kolkata. He suffered a chest infection, and kidney and heart ailments prior to his death. Majumdar donated his body for promotion of medical education to the Anatomy Department of IPGMER and SSKM Hospital in Kolkata.

== Career ==
=== Yatrik ===
Majumdar started his career as a poster illustrator and film technician. His early films were credited to Yatrik (phonetically Jatrik in Bengali), the shared screen name of directors Tarun Majumdar, Sachin Mukherji, and Dilip Mukherji. As Yatrik, their first venture was Chaowa Paowa (1959) starring Uttam Kumar and Suchitra Sen. Yatrik made Kancher Swarga (1962), featuring Dilip Mukherjee as the lead. The name lasted until 1963, after which each director began to be credited separately.

=== Post-Yatrik ===
In 1965, Majumdar made two films, Ektuku Basa starring Soumitra Chatterjee, and Alor Pipasa starring Basanta Choudhury. Sandhya Roy played the female lead in both. In 1967, he directed Balika Badhu, adapted from a Bengali story written by Bimal Kar, in which a teenage Moushumi Chatterjee made her debut. He directed Shriman Prithviraj in 1973, and remade Balika Badhu in Hindi in 1976.

In 1974, Majumdar directed Fuleswari, starring Sandhya Roy as the titular character. Years later, Majumdar acknowledged Fuleswari as his favorite film. In 1975, he directed Sansar Simante, based on a screenplay by Rajen Tarafdar, which was itself adapted from a short story by Premendra Mitra. In 1979, Majumdar's film Ganadevata became the first Bengali film to win the National Film Award for Best Popular Film Providing Wholesome Entertainment. The film was based on the novel of the same name, written by Tarasankar Bandyopadhyay.

Mahua Roychoudhury was cast as the female lead in Dadar Kirti (1980), a film based on a short story by Sharadindu Bandyopadhyay. The film marked the debut of Tapas Paul, who starred as the protagonist Kedar, who falls in love with Saraswati, portrayed by Mahua Roychoudhury. The film won the Roychoudhury Filmfare Awards East in 1981.

Majumdar went on to cast Sandhya Roy in four consecutive films: Shahar Theke Dure (1981), Meghmukti (1982), Khelar Putul (1982), and Amar Geeti (1984). These two films had lower box office returns compared to his previous works, leading to contemporary media discussion regarding Roy's commercial impact at the time. He then cast Tapas Paul and Debashree Roy in the romantic drama Bhalobasa Bhalobasa (1985), which achieved box office success. Majumdar cast Paul in another four films, Pathbhola (1986), Agaman (1988), Parashmoni (1988), and Apan Amar Apan (1990) alongside Prosenjit Chatterjee and Satabdi Roy, which again achieved box office success.

In 2003, he returned to directing with Alo, a film based on a story written by Bibhutibhushan Bandopadhyay. Rituparna Sengupta played the titular role. Consistent with Majumdar's established style, the soundtrack incorporated Rabindra Sangeet.

In 2006, he directed Bhalobasar Onek Naam, casting Uttam Kumar's grandson Gourab Chatterjee, Hemanta Mukherjee's granddaughter, and Moushumi Chatterjee's daughter Megha as lead actors.

In 2007, he made another feature film, Chander Bari. Rituparna Sengupta again was the main lead. Playback singer Babul Supriyo made his debut in this film opposite Rituparna. Again the soundtrack featured Rabindra Sangeet.

His last full-length feature film, Bhalobashar Bari, was released in 2018. Rituparna Sengupta again played the protagonist in the film.

Majumdar's films frequently adapted classical literature and followed a narrative-driven structure, a style that differed from the experimental approaches of some of his contemporaries. He stated in interviews that a film's commercial performance served as an indicator of its quality.

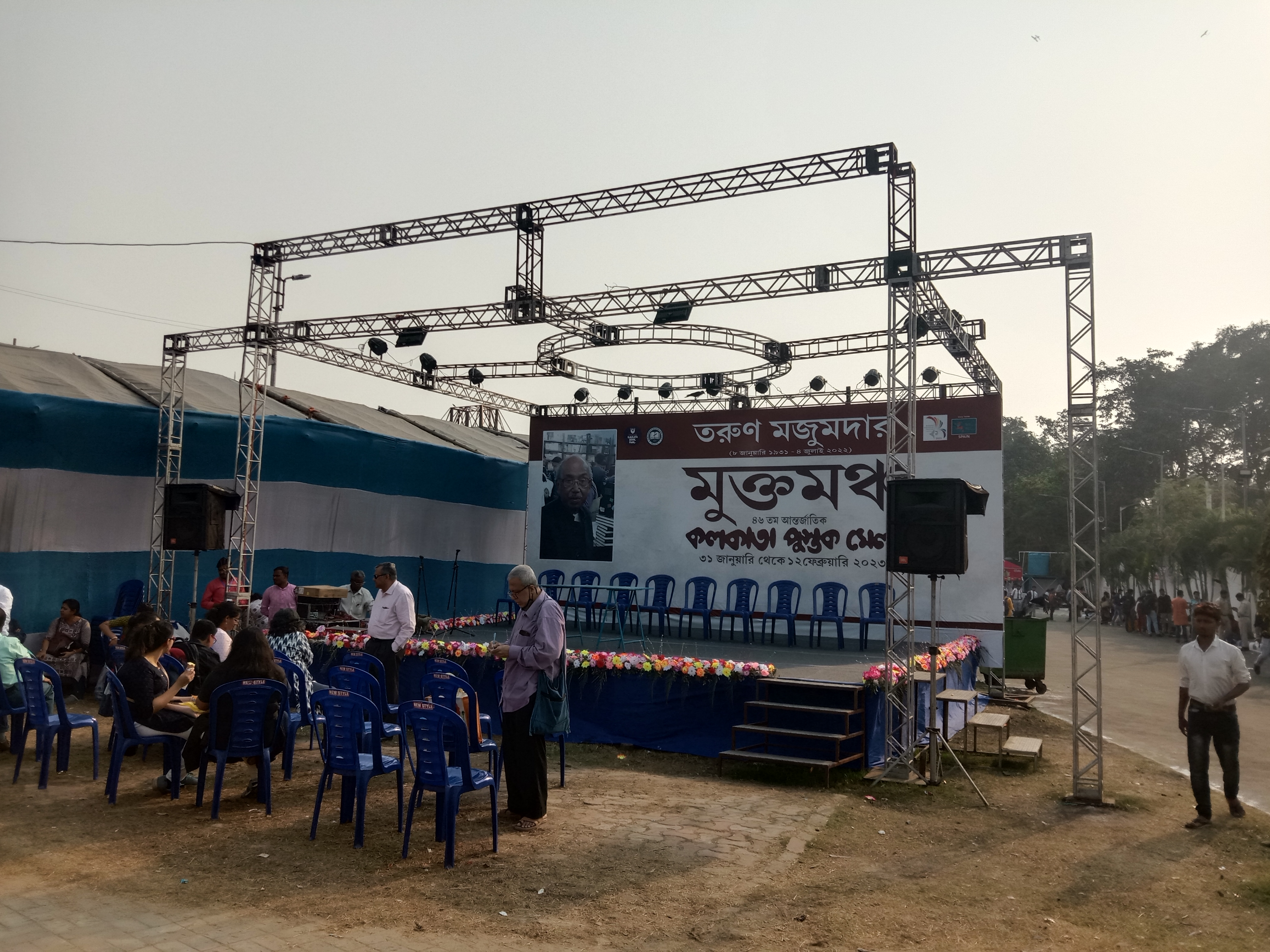
"Muktamancha" in memory of Tarun Majumdar, installed at the 46th International Kolkata Book Fair in Karunamoyee, Salt Lake City, West Bengal, February 2023

== Literary works ==
- Cinemapara Diye, Part 1 & 2
- Batil Chitranatya
- Nakshi Kantha
- Shapla Shaluker Dinguli
- Ghorer Baire Ghor

== Awards ==
Award	Year	Category	Work	Result	Ref.
Padma Shri	1990	Contribution to Indian cinema		Won	
National Award	1963	Best Feature Film in Bengali	Kancher Swargo	Won	
National Award	1972	Best Feature Film in Bengali	Nimantran	Won	
National Award	1979	Best Popular Film Providing Wholesome Entertainment	Ganadevata	Won	
National Award	1984	National Film Award for Best Scientific Film	Aranya Aamar	Won	
National Award	2004	Best Popular Film Providing Wholesome Entertainment	Alo	Nominated	
BFJA Award	1972	Best Director	Nimantran	Won	
BFJA Award	1974	Best Screenplay	Banpalashir Padabali	Won	
BFJA Award	1976	Best Director	Sansar Simanthey	Won	
BFJA Award	1989	Best Lyricist	Parashmoni	Won	
BFJA Award	2004	Most Outstanding Work of the Year	Alo	Won	
BFJA Award	2007	Best Indian Films	Bhalobasar Onek Naam	Won	
BFJA Award	2017	Lifetime Achievement		Won	
Filmfare Awards East	1967	Best Film	Balika Bandhu	Won	
Filmfare Awards East	1972	Best Film	Nimantran	Won	
Filmfare Awards East	1976	Best Film	Sansar Simante	Won	
Filmfare Awards East	1980	Best Film	Ganadevata	Won	
Filmfare Awards East	2021	Lifetime Achievement		Won	
Anandalok Puraskar	2004	Best Film	Alo	Won	
International Film Festival of India	2022	Special Screening	Nimantran	Nominated	
Hyderabad Bengali Film Festival	2018	Special Screening	Nimantran	Nominated	
Hyderabad Bengali Film Festival	2018	Special Screening	Alo	Nominated	
Sydney Film Festival	2016	Special Screening	Chander Bari	Nominated	
Kalakar Award	2018	Lifetime Achievement		Won	

== Filmography ==
Year	Title		Cast	Note	Ref.
Year	Film	TV series	Cast	Note	Ref.
1959	Chaowa Pawa		Uttam Kumar, Suchitra Sen, Tulsi Chakraborty	Credited as Yatrik (along with Sachin Mukherji and Dilip Mukherji)	
1960	Smriti Tuku Thak		Suchitra Sen, Asit Baran, Chhabi Biswas	Credited as Yatrik (along with Sachin Mukherji and Dilip Mukherji)	
1962	Kancher Swarga		Dilip Mukherjee, Anil Chatterjee	Credited as Yatrik (along with Sachin Mukherji and Dilip Mukherji)	
1963	Palatak		Anup Kumar, Sandhya Roy, Ruma Guha Thakurta, Jahor Roy	Credited as Yatrik (along with Sachin Mukherji and Dilip Mukherji)	
1965	Alor Pipasa		Pahadi Sanyal, Basanta Choudhury, Sandhya Roy		
1965	Ektuku Basa		Soumitra Chatterjee, Sandhya Roy, Bhanu Bandyopadhyay, Jahor Roy		
1967	Balika Badhu		Moushumi Chatterjee, Partho Mukherjee		
1969	Rahgir		Biswajit Chatterjee, Sandhya Roy, Shashikala	Movie in Hindi	
1971	Nimantran		Sandhya Roy, Anup Kumar, Kali Banerjee, Pahari Sanyal.		
1971	Kuheli		Biswajit Chatterjee, Debashree Roy, Sandhya Roy, Sumita Sanyal		
1973	Shriman Prithviraj		Ayan Banerjee, Mahua Roychoudhury, Utpal Dutt, Sandhya Roy		
1974	Thagini		Sandhya Roy, Ajitesh Bandyopadhyay, Rabi Ghosh, Anup Kumar		
1974	Fuleswari		Sandhya Roy, Samit Bhanja		
1974	Jadi Jantem		Uttam Kumar, Soumitra Chatterjee, Supriya Devi		
1975	Sansar Simante		Soumitra Chatterjee, Sandhya Roy		
1975	Nagar Darpane		Uttam Kumar, Supriya Devi, Haradhan Banerjee	Credited as Yatrik (along with Sachin Mukherji and Dilip Mukherji)	
1976	Balika Badhu		Sachin, Rajni Sharma, Kajri, Asrani, A. K. Hangal	Movie in Hindi	
1978	Ganadevata		Soumitra Chatterjee, Sandhya Roy, Sumitra Mukherjee, Madhabi Mukherjee		
1980	Dadar Kirti		Tapas Paul, Mahua Roychoudhury, Sandhya Roy, Anup Kumar		
1981	Shahar Theke Dure		Sandhya Roy, Samit Bhanja, Bhanu Bandopadhyay		
1982	Meghmukti		Utpal Dutt, Biswajit Chatterjee, Sandhya Roy, Debashree Roy		
1982	Khelar Putul		Soumitra Chatterjee, Sandhya Roy		
1984	Amar Geeti		Soumitra Chatterjee, Sandhya Roy, Biswajit Chatterjee		
1984	Aranya Aamar			Documentary feature film	
1985	Bhalobasa Bhalobasa		Tapas Paul, Debashree Roy, Utpal Dutt		
1986	Pathbhola		Prosenjit Chatterjee, Tapas Paul, Abhishek Chatterjee, Sandhya Roy		
1988	Agaman		Sandhya Roy, Debashree Roy, Tapas Paul		
1988	Parasmoni		Tapas Paul, Satabdi Roy, Santu Mukhopadhyay		
1990	Apan Aamar Apan		Tapas Paul, Prosenjit Chatterjee, Satabdi Roy		
1991	Path O Prasad		Utpal Dutt, Soumitra Chatterjee, Sandhya Roy		
1991	Sajani Go Sajani		Mahasweta Ray, Utpal Dutt		
1994	Katha Chhilo		Tapas Paul, Mahasweta Ray		
1994	Akuha katha		Uttam Mohanty, Aparajita Mohanty	Movie in Odia	
2003	Alo		Rituparna Sengupta, Abhishek Chatterjee, Bhaswar Chattopadhyay, Soumili Biswas		
2004		Rangamatir poth	Goutam Halder	Short film	
2005		O Amar desher Maati	Bhaswar Chatterjee, Ayan Banerjee	Short film	
2005	Bhalobasar Onek Naam		Gourab Chatterjee, Megha Mukherjee, Soumitra Chatterjee, Moushumi Chatterjee, Tapas Paul		
2007	Chander Bari		Soham Chakraborty, Koel Mallick, Ranjit Mallick, Rituparna Sengupta		
2010		Daak diye jai	Paran Bandopadhyay	Short film	
2014		Durgesh Nandini	Paran Bandopadhyay, Tapas Paul, Aatish Bhattacharya	TV series	
2018	Bhalobashar Bari		Pratik Sen, Silajit, Rituparna Sengupta, Arjun Chakraborty, Sreela Majumdar		
2018	Adhikar			Documentary feature film	
2018		Tobu Mone Rekho	Khapang Tripura, Adrija, Aloy Deb Barma	Short film	

== Recognition ==
Nimantran has been restored and digitized by the National Film Archive of India. Tarun Majumdar was the recipient of the prestigious Padma Shri Award in 1990. He won the Lifetime Achievement honor at the West Bengal Film Journalist Association Awards in 2017.

West Bengal Chief Minister Mamata Banerjee expressed grief over the death of Tarun Majumdar.

== See also ==
- Akira Kurosawa
- Pracheta Gupta
- Prabhat Roy
- Shiboprosad Mukherjee
- Satyajit Ray

== See also ==
- Raj Chakraborty
- Sujit Mondal
