= Palatak =

1963 film directed by Jatrik

- Directed by: Jatrik (Dilip Mukherjee, Sachin Mukherjee, Tarun Majumder)
- Written by: Manoj Basu
- Produced by: V. Shantaram
- Starring: Anup Kumar; Sandhya Roy; Anubha Gupta; Ruma Guha Thakurta
- Cinematography: Soumendu Roy
- Edited by: Dulal Dutta
- Music by: Hemanta Mukherjee
- Release date: 1963
- Country: India
- Language: Bengali

Palatak is a 1963 Bengali film directed by Jatrik. The film features actors Anup Kumar, Sandhya Roy and Ruma Guha Thakurta in the lead roles. The film was based on "Angti Chattujjer Vai", a Bengali short story by Manoj Basu. Shyamsundar Ghosh composed the music for the film. The movie was remade in Hindi in 1969 as Rahgir.

== Plot ==
A man named Basanta Chatujje (describing himself as Angti Chattujje's brother) who could not stand bounds and chains bitten by wanderlust. In spite of the fact that he hailed from a rich Zamindari family and could have lived in comfort, his wanderlust took him to newer and different places where he encountered new people and mingled with their lives. He marries a woman named Harimati and returns home to his family with his wife. But after a few days unaware of the fact that his wife is pregnant, he leaves her to go on another journey. Subsequent incidents bring him back to his house, only to find he has a son and his wife is no more. Heartbroken, he finds solace on a boat in the river while his zamindar brother launches a search mission for him.

== Cast ==
- Anup Kumar as Basanta Chatujje
- Sandhya Roy as Harimati
- Anubha Gupta as Golap
- Arun Mukherjee
- Ruma Guha Thakurta as Moyna
- Jahar Ganguly
- Jahor Roy
- Rabi Ghosh
- Asit Baran
- Amar Biswas
- Bharati Devi
- Shyamal Ghoshal
- Asha Devi
- Tinu Ghosh

== Soundtrack ==
All songs were composed by Hemanta Mukherjee. All of the songs except "Aha Re Bidhi Go" were written by Mukul Dutt. The song "Aha Re Bidhi Go" was written by Gauriprasanna Mazumder. The songs are:

- "Aha Krishna Kalo" - Hemanta Mukherjee
- "Dosh Diyo Na Amay Bondhu" - Hemanta Mukherjee
- "Jibanpurer Pathik Re Bhai" - Hemanta Mukherjee
- "Sakhi Hey Amar Jware Anga" - Hemanta Mukherjee
- "Chinite Parini Bondhu" - Ruma Guha Thakurta, Geeta Dutt
- "Mon Je Amar Kemon Kemon Kare" - Ruma Guha Thakurta, Geeta Dutt
- "Aha Re Bidhi Go" - Pankaj Mitra

== Awards ==
- BFJA Awards (1964) for
- Best Actor - Anup Kumar
- Best Actress in supporting role - Ruma Guha Thakurta
