= Thagini =

1974 Bengali suspense drama film

Thagini (The Lady Thug) is a 1974 Bengali suspense drama film directed by Tarun Majumdar based on a short story of Subodh Ghosh. The music of the film was scored by Hemanta Mukherjee.

== Plot ==
After being betrayed by his friend Rajen Mukherjee, a cashier named Haripada and his assistant, Banku, break into the office locker to fund his daughter Karabi's wedding. However, they are caught and sentenced to two years in prison. Upon their release, left with no options, the trio turns to a life of crime: Karabi marries wealthy men only to flee with their jewelry. After evading the police and escaping to Kolkata, Karabi meets Amit, an innocent young man who happens to be Rajen's son. While Haripada plots his revenge against his old betrayer, complications arise when Karabi genuinely falls in love with Amit.

== Cast ==
- Utpal Dutt as Haripada
- Sandhya Roy as Karabi
- Ajitesh Bandopadhyay
- Chinmoy Roy
- Robi Ghosh as Banku
- Anup Kumar as Amit
- Jahor Roy
- Shekhar Chattopadhyay
- Tapen Chatterjee
- Shobha Sen
- Bankim Ghosh
- Biren Chattopadhyay
- Haridhan Mukhopadhyay
- Juin Banerjee
