= Rajen Tarafdar =

Indian actor and film director

- Tarafdar in Akaler Shandhaney
- Born: 7 July 1917; Rajshahi, Bengal Presidency, British India
- Died: 23 November 1987 (aged 70); Calcutta, West Bengal, India
- Occupations: Film director, actor and writer

Rajen Tarafdar (7 July 1917 – 23 November 1987) was an Indian film director, actor, and screenwriter. He was the recipient of two National Awards and two BFJA Awards.

He graduated from the Government College of Art & Craft in Calcutta in 1940 with a degree in popular arts. He was initially a graphic designer in an advertising agency before devoting himself to cinema. His directorial debut was Antariksha (1957).

== Awards ==
Award	Year	Category	Film	Result	Ref.
National Award	1960	Best feature film in Bengali	Ganga	Won	
National Award	1975	Best feature film in Bengali	Palanka	Won	
BFJA Award	1976	Best Screenplay	Sansar Simante	Won	
BFJA Award	1988	Best Director	Nagpash	Won	

== Filmography ==
Year	Film	Language	Writer	Screenplay	Director	Actor	Ref.
1957	Antariksha	Bengali	Yes	Yes	Yes		
1960	Ganga	Bengali		Yes	Yes		
1962	Agnisikha	Bengali			Yes		
1964	Jiban Kahini	Bengali			Yes		
1967	Akash Chhnoa	Bengali	Yes	Yes	Yes		
1975	Palanka	Bengali			Yes		
1975	Sansar Simante	Bengali		Yes	Tarun Majumdar		
1979	Ganadevata	Bengali		Yes	Tarun Majumdar		
1980	Akaler Shandhaney	Bengali			Mrinal Sen	Yes	
1983	Arohan	Hindi			Shyam Benegal	Yes	
1984	Khandhar	Hindi			Mrinal Sen	Yes	
1986	Basundhara	Bengali			Sekhar Chatterjee	Yes	
1987	Nagpash	Bengali			Yes		
