= Basanta Bilap =

1973 Indian Bengali film

- Directed by: Dinen Gupta
- Screenplay by: Shekhar Chatterjee
- Story by: Bimal Kar
- Starring: Soumitra Chatterjee; Aparna Sen; Rabi Ghosh; Anup Kumar
- Cinematography: Dinen Gupta
- Edited by: Ramesh Joshi
- Music by: Sudhin Dasgupta
- Production company: Sonali Productions
- Release date: 1973 (India)
- Running time: 117 minutes
- Country: India
- Language: Bengali

Basanta Bilap is a 1973 Indian Bengali language romantic comedy film directed by Dinen Gupta. It is based on a novel by Bimal Kar.

== Plot ==
The story revolves around a group of neighborhood boys and the residents of "Basanta Bilap," a working women's hostel. Focusing primarily on four boys and four girls, the film follows a series of hilarious clashes between the two rival groups that eventually pave the way for romance.

== Cast ==
- Soumitra Chatterjee as Shyam Sundar Ghose aka Shyam, leader of the boys
- Aparna Sen as Anuradha Singha aka Radha, leader of the girls
- Rabi Ghosh as Gupto
- Kajal Gupta as Parbati aka Paro
- Anup Kumar as Lalit aka Lalu
- Sumitra Mukherjee as Nabanita aka Nita
- Chinmoy Roy as Siddheswar Bandapadhyay aka Sidhu
- Sibani Bose as Aalo Ray
- Amarnath Mukherjee as Ajay, Lalu's elder brother
- Kanika Majumdar as Ajay's wife, and a mediator between the two groups
- Tarun Kumar Chatterjee as Dr. Girija Sapui, a homeopathy doctor
- Gita Dey as Sidhu's Aunty(Kakima)
- Haridhan Mukhopadhyay as the tenant/landlord of Basanta Bilap

== Soundtrack ==
Basanta Bilap

Soundtrack album

All music is composed by Sudhin Dasgupta.

Songs
No.	Title	Playback	Length
1.	"Ami Miss Calcutta"	Arati Mukhopadhyay
2.	"Agun Legeche Legeche"	Manna De, Rabi Ghosh, Chinmoy Roy
3.	"O Shayam Jakhan Takhan"	Arati Mukhopadhyay, Sujata Mukherjee
4.	"Ek Charatei Thanda"	Arati Mukhopadhyay
