= Shakti Thakur =

Indian actor, comedian, and playback singer (1947–2020)

- Born: Shakti Thakur; 1947; Calcutta, Bengal Presidency, British India
- Died: 5 October 2020 (aged 72–73); Kolkata, West Bengal, India
- Occupations: Actor; singer
- Children: 2, including Monali Thakur
- Musical career
- Genre: Film music
- Instrument: Vocalist
- Years active: 1980–2020

Shakti Thakur (1947 – 5 October 2020) was an Indian actor, comedian and playback singer. He has acted in many Bengali as well as several Hindi films and also lent his voice in films. His repertoire includes Yeh Desh (1984), Aagoon (1988), Sajanj Go Sajani (1994) etc.

== Career ==
Thakur was a school teacher in his primary life. He later started his film career in 1976 with Tapan Sinha's "Harmonium" film as a playback singer. He, later on, starred in films like Dadar Kirti (1980) and Bhalobasha Bhalobasha. He was successful as an actor. He mostly played comedy roles in films.

Thakur was a classically trained singer. He sang songs under the baton of composers like Hemanta Mukhopadhyay, Ajoy Das and R. D. Burman etc. In 1984, he debuted in Bollywood when prominent composer R. D. Burman gave him a chance to sing a group song in Hindi film Yeh Desh alongside Kumar Sanu, Udit Narayan and Shailendra Singh. It was also the debut song of Kumar Sanu. After this, he lent his voice for many Bengali and Hindi films. In 1988, he sang a duet "Khali Pete Korle Bhojon" with veteran singer Kishore Kumar in a Bengali film Aagoon.

== Personal life ==
Thakur has two daughters: Mehuli and Monali. His elder daughter Mehuli Thakur is a Rabindra Sangeet singer. His younger daughter Monali Thakur was a contestant at Indian Idol Season 2. She later went on to become a leading playback singer in Bengali as well as Bollywood film industry. On his death, Monali shared a heartbroken note and cited that all she has become today is due to him. Shakti Thakur's wife Minati Thakur died on 17 May 2024 due to kidney related ailments.

== Death ==
On 5 October 2020, Thakur died at the age of 73 following a massive heart attack. Many fellow actors and singers paid tribute to him.
