= Sandhya Roy =

Indian actress and politician

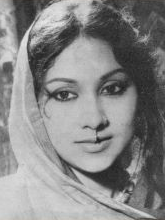
- Roy in the film Palanka (1975)

Member of Parliament, Lok Sabha
- In office 16 May 2014 – 23 May 2019
- Preceded by: Prabodh Panda
- Succeeded by: Dilip Ghosh
- Constituency: Medinipur

Personal details
- Party: Trinamool Congress (2014–present)
- Born: 11 April 1941 (age 85); Nabadwip, Bengal Presidency, British India
- Occupations: Actress; Politician
- Years active: 1956–2009
- Notable work: Alor Pipasa; Nimantran; Phuleshwari; Baba Taraknath; Ganadevata; Sansar Simante; Dadar Kirti
- Spouse: Tarun Majumdar (m. 1967; died 2022)

Sandhya Roy (born 11 April 1941) is an Indian actress and politician. One of the most successful actresses of Bengali cinema, she reigned as a leading actress for approximately 30 years. She has received numerous awards including four BFJA Awards and a Filmfare Award for Best Actress for Ganadevata.

== Acting career ==
Roy made her silver screen debut with Mamlar Phol (1956). She rose to stardom for her role as Shabala in Salil Sen's Nagini Kanyar Kahini (1958) based on Tarasankar Bandyopadhyay's celebrated novel of the same name. She is noted for her roles in films such as Nimantran, Phuleswari (1972), Ami Sirajer Begam (1973), and Ashani Sanket (1974).

== Political career ==
In 2014, she contested the Lok Sabha elections from the Medinipur constituency for the Trinamool Congress. She won the election and became a member of Parliament of India.

== Filmography ==
Year	Title	Role	Note	Ref.
1956	Mamlar Phol			
1957	Antariksha			
1958	Brindaban Leela			
1958	Kangsa			
1958	Naginikanyar Kahini	Shabala		
1959	Jal-Jangal			
1959	Nrityeri Tale Tale			
1959	Sree Sree Nityananda Prabhu			
1960	Dui Bechara			
1960	Ganga			
1960	Kathin Maya			
1960	Maya Mriga			
1961	Arghya			
1961	Subha Dristi			
1962	Rakta Palash			
1962	Nav Diganta			
1962	Dhoop Chhaya			
1962	Bandhan			
1962	Asli-Naqli			Main actress in song "Lakh chhupao chhup na sakega raaz ho kitna gehra"
1963	Palatak			
1963	Bhrantibilas			
1964	Pooja Ke Phool			
1964	Jiban Kahini	Shyamali		
1965	Surya Tapa			
1965	Ek Tuku Basa			
1965	Antaral			
1965	Alor Pipasa			
1966	Monihar			
1966	Natun Jiban			
1967	Prastar Swakshar			
1968	Tin Adhyay			
1968	Baghini	Dugga		
1969	Rahgir			
1969	Dadu			
1969	Aparachita			
1969	Arogya Niketan			
1970	Rupasi			
1971	Nimantran			
1971	Jaane-Anjaane			
1971	Kuheli			
1973	Chithi			
1973	Sriman Prithviraj			
1973	Ami Sirajer Begam			
1973	Ashani Sanket			
1974	Thagini			
1974	Fuleswari			
1975	Sansar Seemantey			
1975	Palanka			
1977	Baba Taraknath			
1977	Kabita			
1978	Ke Tumi			
1978	Dhanraj Tamang			
1979	Ganadevata			
1980	Nagpash			
1980	Dadar Kirti			
1981	Shahar Theke Dooray			
1981	Meghmukti			
1981	Khana Baraha			
1981	Khelar Putul			
1983	Amar Geeti			
1983	Agradani			
1986	Pathbhola			
1986	Bouma	Laxmi		
1986	Achena Mukh			
1988	Choto Bou			
1991	Path-o-Prasad			
1991	Nabab			
1992	Satya Mithya			
2004	Debipaksha			
2007	Nabab Nandini			
2009	Maa Amar Maa			

== Awards ==
- "Banga Bibhushan" – the highest civilian award in West Bengal for her contribution to Indian Cinema in 2013.
- BFJA Award – Best Supporting Actress Award for Tin Adhay in 1969.
- BFJA Award – Best Actress Award for Nimantran in 1972.
- BFJA Award – Best Actress Award for Sansar Simante in 1976.
- BFJA Award – Best Actress Award for Ganadevata in 1979.
- Filmfare Awards East – Best Actress Award for Ganadevata in 1979.
- National Film Award For Best Popular Film Providing Wholesome Entertainment – Ganadevata in 1979.
- Bharatnirman Award in 1997.
- Kalakar Awards – Lifetime Achievement Award in 2005.
