= Ranjit Mallick filmography =

Indian film actor, producer and television presenter

The following is the complete filmography of Indian actor, television personality and producer Ranjit Mallick, who primarily works in Bengali cinema. He has appeared in over 184 films in a career spanning over five decades. He made his acting debut in 1971 with Mrinal Sen's political drama Interview. In 1974, he played his breakthrough role of Shitesh Roy in Arabinda Mukhopadhyay's comedy film Mouchak, in which he shared screen with Uttam Kumar. Despite being regarded for portraying a variety of characters on screen, Mallick is referred to as "Pratibadi Nayak" (Bengali for The Rebellious Hero) for his portrayal of mostly rebellious characters in his filmography.

== Films ==
Year	Film	Roles	Notes	Ref.
1971	Interview	Ranjit Mallick (himself)	Acting debut	
1972	Calcutta 71	Ranjit Mallick (himself)		
1972	Picnic	Somnath		
1973	Parivartan	Sunil	Hindi film debut	
1973	Naya Nasha	Dr. Samar Chaudhary	Hindi film	
1974	Debi Chowdhurani	Brajeshwar		
1974	Chhera Tamsuk			
1974	Mouchak	Sitesh Roy		
1975	Swayamsiddha	Gobinda		
1975	Rag Anurag			
1976	Swikarakti			
1976	Dampati			
1976	Ajasra Dhanyabad			
1976	Banhisikha	CID Inspector Pradyot Ghosh		
1976	Aparajita			
1977	Proxy	Arun, Tarun (Note: Mallick played dual roles in the film.)		
1977	Pratisruti			
1977	Nana Ranger Dinguli			
1977	Mantramugdha			
1977	Kabita	Tilak		
1977	Hate Roilo Tin			
1977	Ei Prithibir Panthanibas			
1977	Din Amader			
1978	Tilottama			
1978	Rajani			
1978	Moyna		25th film	
1978	Laal Kuthi	Bikram	Simultaneously shot in Hindi as Laal Kothi	
1979	Srikanter Will			
1979	Jiban Je Rokom			
1980	Dui Prithibi	Sukanta		
1980	Bhagyachakra			
1981	Ogo Bodhu Shundori	Sandeep		
1981	Kapalkundala	Nabakumar		
1981	Father			
1982	Uttar Meleni			
1982	Shathe Shathyang	Joy, Bijoy		
1982	Sankalpa			
1982	Rajbandhu			
1982	Bijoyini			
1983	Protidan	Samir		
1984	Shatru	OC Subhankar Sanyal		
1984	Pujarini			
1984	Prayashchitta			
1984	Lal Golap			
1984	Bishabriksha			
1985	Sandhya Pradip			
1985	Ahuti			
1986	Swargasukh			
1986	Mutkapran			
1986	Bouma			
1986	Anuradha		50th film	
1986	Abhishap			
1986	Abhiman			
1987	Sargam			
1987	Rudrabina			
1987	Pratibha			
1987	Mahamilan			
1987	Guru Dakshina	Rajat Roy		
1987	Dolanchanpa			
1987	Debika			
1987	Bidrohi			
1987	Anurodh			
1988	Kalankini Nayika			
1988	Debi Baran	Satyapriya		
1988	Chhoto Bou	Minu		
1988	Anjali	Dipak		
1989	Shatarupa			
1989	Mangaldeep	Mangal		
1989	Judge Saheb			
1989	Bandini			
1989	Aakrosh			
1989	Agnitrishna			
1990	Mahajan			
1990	Hirak Jayanti			
1990	Debota			
1990	Chakranta		75th film	
1991	Najarbondi			
1991	Nabab			
1991	Bourani			
1991	Bidhir Bidhan			
1991	Bidhilipi			
1991	Ahankar			
1991	Abhagini			
1992	Shakha Proshakha	Pratap Majumder / Kiran Kumar (Note: Mallick played a single character with different names.)		
1992	Indrajit	Indrajit		
1992	Ananya			
1993	Shraddhanjali	Ranjan Banerjee		
1993	Maya Mamata			
1993	Maan Samman			
1993	Ishwar Parameshwar			
1993	Ghar Sansar			
1994	Tumi Je Aamar	Arun Chowdhury		
1994	Geet Sangeet			
1994	Abbajan			
1995	Sansar Sangram			
1995	Sangharsha	Dr. Subhankar Chowdhury		
1995	Mejo Bou	Arun		
1995	Antaratamo			
1995	Abirbhab			
1996	Rabibar			
1996	Puja	Ayan	100th film	
1996	Naach Nagini Naach Re			
1996	Mukhyamantri	Bimal		
1996	Mahan			
1997	Sriman Bhutnath			
1997	Loafar			
1997	Boro Bou			
1997	Bidroho			
1997	Ajker Santan			
1998	Sindurer Adhikar			
1998	Ranakshetra	Prof. Sudeb Mitra / Preetam Singh		
1998	Jamai No.1			
1998	Chowdhury Paribar			
1998	Asal Nakal			
1998	Ami Sei Meye			
1998	Aamar Maa			
1999	Sundar Bou	Savitri's Uncle		
1999	Sindur Khela			
1999	Santan	Rajib		
1999	Niyoti			
1999	Jibon Niye Khela	Dr. Subhankar Sanyal		
1999	Gunda			
1999	Daye Dayitya			
1999	Agni Shikha	Arjun		
2000	Sasurbari Zindabad	Achintya Kumar Roy		
2000	Shapath Nilam		125th film	
2000	Satruta			
2000	Moyna			
2000	Aamader Sansar			
2001	Sud Asal			
2001	Rakhi Purnima	Rakhi and Purnima's Father		
2001	Pratibad	Azaad Bhai		
2001	Dada Thakur	Sarathi		
2001	Bidhatar Khela			
2002	Streer Maryada			
2002	Sathi	Keshto Da		
2002	Nishana			
2002	Manush Amanush			
2002	Chhelebela			
2002	Chandramollika			
2002	Bangali Babu			
2003	Uddhar			
2003	Sneher Protidan			
2003	Sejo Bou			
2003	Santrash	Subhankar		
2003	Sangee	Prabhu		
2003	Rakta Bandhan			
2003	Nater Guru	Shashi Bhushan Mukherjee		
2003	Mejdidi			
2003	Mayer Anchal	Janardhan		
2003	Biswas Ghatak		150th film	
2004	Swapne Dekha Rajkanya			
2004	Surya	Abinash		
2004	Sindurer Bandhan			
2004	Paribar	Suryakanta Bose		
2004	Kuyasha			
2004	Gyaraakol			
2004	Dadu No. 1	Bhabani Chatterjee		
2004	Akritagya			
2005	Tomake Selam			
2005	Tobu Bhalobasi			
2005	Sangram	Col. Bikram Sinha		
2005	Raju Uncle	CID Inspector Ranjit Mallick (himself)		
2005	Mayer Raja			
2005	Manik	Chandrakanta Majumder		
2005	Dadar Adesh	Krishnakanta Roy		
2005	Tattt			
2005	Agnipath			
2005	Abiswasi			
2007	Nabab Nandini	Rajat Banerjee		
2007	Kaka No.1			
2007	Chander Bari	Shyam Sundar Sanyal		
2008	Shibaji	Prashanta Mallick		
2008	Premer Kahini	Col. Sinha		
2008	Janmadata	Durgacharan Singha		
2009	Saat Paake Bandha	Subhankar Banerjee	175th film	
2009	Maa Aamar Maa			
2011	Duti Mon			
2018	Honeymoon	Pranesh Bhattacharya		
2022	Aporajeyo	Subhankar Sanyal		
2022	Kachher Manush	Bikash Sengupta		
2023	Love Marriage	Mahim Sanyal		
2023	Tarokar Mrityu			
2024	Daroga Mamur Kirti	Daroga Mamu		
2025	Sharthopor	Lawyer GK Laha		

== Television ==
=== As actor ===
Year	Title	Platform	Role	Notes	Ref
2023	Ghosh Babur Retirement Plan	Addatimes	Ghosh Babu	OTT debut	

=== As guest ===
Year	Title	Platform	Notes
2009	Ghosh & Company	Star Jalsha	Guest
