= Tapas Paul filmography =

- Film: 200+
- Television series: 2

Tapas Paul was an Indian actor and politician who is known for his work in Bengali cinema. Winner of a Filmfare Award, Paul became one of the most successful actors of Bengali cinema during 1980s and 1990s. He is widely celebrated for his on-screen romantic image. He made successful romantic collaborations with actresses such as Mahua Roychoudhury, Debashree Roy, Satabdi Roy, Indrani Dutta and Rachana Banerjee. He made his debut in Tarun Majumdar's romantic drama Dadar Kirti (1980).

== Films ==
Key
‡	Indicates a short film	§	Indicates a telefilm

Year	Title	Role	Director	Note	Ref.
1980	Dadar Kirti	Kedar	Tarun Majumdar		
1981	Saheb	Saheb	Bijoy Basu		
1983	Samapti		Bijoy Bose		
1984	Ajante		Arbinda Mukherjee		
1984	Parabat Priya		Dipranjan Bose		
1984	Deepar Prem		Moon Moon Sen		
1984	Abodh	Shankar Singh	Hiren Nag		
1985	Baidurya Rahasya		Tapan Sinha		
1985	Nishantey		Narayan Chakraborty		
1985	Bhalobasha Bhalobasha	Arup	Tarun Majumdar		
1986	Anurager Chowa		Johor Biswas		
1986	Pathbhola		Tarun Majumdar		
1986	Ashirbad		Biresh Chattopadhyay		
1986	Jibon		Ardhendu Chatterjee		
1987	Guru Dakshina	Jayanta	Anjan Choudhury		
1987	Jar Je Priya		Salil Dutta		
1987	Paap Punya		Rajat Das		
1987	Rudrabina		Pinaki Mukherjee		
1987	Surer Akashe		Biresh Chatterjee		
1988	Channachara				
1988	Agaman		Tarun Majumdar		
1988	Antaranga		Dinen Gupta		
1988	Pratik		Prabhat Roy		
1988	Parashmani		Tarun Majumdar		
1988	Toofan	Raja	Biresh Chatterjee		
1989	Angaar		Srinibas Chakraborty		
1989	Asha		Anup Sengupta		
1989	Chhokher Aloy		Sachin Adhikari		
1989	Mangal Deep	Deep	Haranath Chakraborty		
1989	Tumi Koto Sundar		Manoj Ghosh		
1990	Rajnartaki		Narayan Chakraborty		
1990	Abishkar		Salil Dutta		
1990	Apan Amar Apan		Tarun Majumdar		
1990	Jibon Songi		Ravi Kinagi		
1990	Garmil		Dilip Roy		
1990	Anuraag		Jawhar Biswas		
1990	Mon Mayuree		Biresh Chatterjee		
1990	Bolidan		Anil Ganguly		
1991	Antarer Bhalobasa		Bimal Roy		
1991	Nilimay Neel		Biresh Chatterjee		
1991	Maan Maryada		Sukhen Das		
1991	Debar		Amal Roy Ghatak		
1991	Pati Param Guru		Biresh Chatterjee		
1992	Surer Bhubaney		Prabir Mitra		
1992	Bahadur		Abhijit Sen		
1992	Mayabini		Tushar Majumdar		
1993	Maya Mamata		Anjan Choudhury		
1993	Rajar Meye Parul		Milan Chowdhury		
1993	Dan Protidan		Sukhen Das		
1993	Atithi Shilpi		Kalidas Chakraborty		
1993	Amar Kahini		Indraneil Goswami		
1993	Duranta Prem		Prabhat Roy		
1994	Tumi Je Aamar		Inder Sen		
1994	Boumoni		Partha Pratim Chowdhury		
1995	Antartama				
1995	Sangharsha	Rana	Haranath Chakraborty		
1995	Lady Doctor		Bimal Dey		
1995	Pratidhwani		Anup Sengupta		
1995	Antartama		Dinbondhu Ghosh		
1995	Mejo Bou	Barun	Bablu Samaddar		
1996	Jamaibabu		Dulal Bhowmik		
1997	Ajker Santan		Haranath Chakraborty		
1997	Kamalar Banabas		Swapan Saha		
1997	Matir Manush		Swapan Saha		
1998	Shimul Parul		Swapan Saha		
1998	Nayaner Alo		Swapan Saha		
1998	Praner Cheye Priyo		Swapan Saha		
1998	Banglar Badhu				
1999	Sundar Bou		Sujit Guha		
1999	Santan Jwakhon Shatru		Swapan Saha		
1999	Santan		Anjan Choudhury		
1999	Tumi Ele Tai		Prabhat Roy		
2000	Uttara		Buddhadeb Dasgupta		
2000	Rin Mukti		Dinen Guptaj		
2001	Rakhi Poornima		Anjan Chowdhury		
2002	Mondo Meyer Upakhyan		Buddhadeb Dasgupta		
2002	Shatrur Mokabila		Swapan Saha		
2002	Kurukshetra	Rahul Roy	Swapan Saha		
2002	Sonar Sansar		Anup Sengupta		
2003	Mayer Anchal		Anup Sengupta		
2003	Sabuj Sathi		Swapan Saha		
2003	Sukh Dukher Sansar		Swapan Saha		
2003	Guru	Iqbal	Swapan Saha		
2003	Kartabya		Swapan Saha		
2004	Tyaag	Avik	Swapan Saha		
2004	Agni		Swapan Saha		
2004	Protisodh		Anup Sengupta		
2004	Rajababu		Anup Sengupta		
2005	Chore Chore Mastuto Bhai		Anup Sengupta		
2005	Sathihara		Biresh Chatterjee		
2005	Sudhu Bhalobasha		Raj Mukherjee		
2006	Abhimanyu		Swapan Saha		
2006	Hero	SP Indrajit Sen	Swapan Saha		
2006	Ghatak	DSP Ranabir Roy	Swapan Saha		
2006	Khalnayak		Ratan Adhikari		
2006	Shikar		Saran Dutta		
2007	I Love You	Indra	Ravi Kinagi		
2007	Greptar	Sukhomoy Sen	Swapan Saha		
2008	Janmadata	Iqbal	Swapan Saha		
2008	Shibaji				
2008	Mahakaal	Ajoy Mukherjee			
2008	Mon Maane Na	ACP Rehman	Sujit Guha		
2010	Josh	Surya Narayan Chaudhury	Ravi Kinagi		
2010	Shedin Dekha Hoyechilo	Neelkanta Roy	Sujit Mondal		
2011	Krishna				
2011	Mon Bole Priya Priya				
2012	8:08 Er Bongaon Local		Debaditya		
2012	Challenge 2	Debraj Roy	Raja Chanda		
2012	Ullas (film)		Ishwar Chakraborty		
2013	Khoka 420		Rajiv Kumar Biswas	It was Paul's 5th and Last film with Dev	
2013	Swabhoomi				
2013	Khiladi		Ashok Pati		
2014	Durgesh Nandini		Tarun Majumdar		TV series
2017	Paribartan		Satabdi Roy		
2020	Du Taka ‡		Debaditya	Bengali short film produced by Satabdi Roy	
2021	Beg For Life		Suvendu Das		

== TV series ==
Year	Title	Role	Director	Channel	Note	Ref.
1993	Dey Rey			ETV Bangla		
1997	Ogo Priyotama			DD Bangla		
