= Uttam Kumar's unrealized projects =

Uttam Kumar was an Indian actor, director, producer, screenwriter, playback singer and composer who predominantly worked in Bengali cinema. In his career, he had worked on a number of projects which never progressed beyond the pre-production stage under his acting commitments or direction. Some of his projects did not progress to post-production, fell into production limbo or were officially cancelled.

== 1940s ==
=== Maya Dore ===
The Hindi film Maya Dore was the first film in which Kumar first got the opportunity to act, after he entered the film industry in 1947. He used to appear as an extra in the film. Although he acted for five days at Bharatlaxmi Studios for a fee of ₹125, the film remained unreleased.

== 1950s ==
=== Chokh ===
When Kumar met his initial successes with Sharey Chuattor and Agni Pariksha in 1954, a film titled Chokh was announced on the flip side of the booklet for 1954 film Ei Shotyi. Directed by Suresh Halder, the film was to star Kumar and Asit Baran together, alongside Sabitri Chatterjee. Produced by Kinema Exchange Ltd., it was based on a story by Satya Banerjee. The film was later dropped owing to creative differences between Baran and Halder.

=== Jabar Bela Pichhu Daake ===
Following the success of Ekti Raat (1956), H. N. C. Productions planned to repeat the collaboration between director Chitta Basu and Kumar, with the announcement of Jabar Bela Pichhu Daake. It was to star Mala Sinha and Sandhyarani in the female leads.

=== Martyer Mrittika ===
Director Sudhir Mukherjee planned to bring back the iconic pairing of Kumar and Suchitra Sen with the film Martyer Mrittika, after the blockbuster Shap Mochan (1955). It was supposed to be produced by Mukherjee himself under the banner of Production Syndicate. It had its first advertisement on a booklet for the film Bhola Master (1956).

=== Namaskar Sir ===
The film was officially announced on the flip side of the booklet of the film Ogo Sunchho (1957). Later, the makers abandoned the project due to creative differences.

=== Panka Tilak ===
Announced in 1957, Panka Tilak was initially to feature Kumar and Sandhya Roy under Mangal Chakravarty's direction. Despite the completion of the muhurat, the project was shelved as a result of scheduling conflicts with Kumar. Eventually Kumar opted out of the film and Kali Banerjee replaced him, and it has its release in 1961.

=== Kaantar Kanya ===
Kumar was to star in Niren Lahiri's adventure film Kaantar Kanya, alongside Kaberi Bose. Announced on the booklet of the 1958 film Dhumketu, it was supposed to be produced by National Cine Corporation, while got shelved due to some unknown issues.

== 1960s ==
=== Nodir Naamti Anjana ===
Based on a story by Premendra Mitra and also having his own screenplay, the project was to be directed by Sukumar Dasgupta. Announced on the booklet of Kumar starrer Haat Baralei Bandhu (1960), it had to feature Kumar and Suchitra Sen, while it could not came on the board.

=== Ghare Baire ===
Satyajit Ray had adapted Rabindranath Tagore's 1916 eponymous novel of the same in 1956. He further stated that it remained one of his "dream projects" and that he had hoped to work on during his career. For this film, he approached Kumar to play Sandip in 1962; but Kumar rejected Ray's offer, advising him to find a better actor, as he felt himself improper to portray an antagonistic character. Despite rejecting the role, Kumar requested Ray to allow him to produce the film under his then banner Alo Chhaya Productions. However, Ray worked on the first draft of the script and concentrated on filming Mahanagar (1963). Eventually, his plan fell through and he collaborated with Kumar for the first time with Nayak in 1966.

Two years after Kumar's death, in 1983, Ray began reworking on the script and cast Soumitra Chatterjee as Sandip, with Victor Banerjee and Swatilekha Chatterjee as Nikhilesh and Bimala respectively. Produced by R. D. Bansal, the film released in 1984 and received three accolades at the 32nd National Film Awards.

=== Kinu Gowalar Goli ===
Director O. C. Ganguly's first choice for the male lead was Kumar, however later he roped in Soumitra Chatterjee, on the instruction of story writer Santosh Kumar Ghosh. Reportedly, Kumar was invited during the commencement of the filming, who gave the clapstick. Later, the film released in 1964.

=== Ghanta Fatak ===
Bijoy Bose planned to make the film with Kumar and Supriya Devi, which had its first announcement on the booklet of another Kumar starrer Thana Theke Aschhi (1965). Despite being shelved, it was revived by Bose nine years later and released as Alor Thikana (1974) starring Kumar and Aparna Sen, who replaced Devi.

=== Jamuna Ki Teer ===
Following the massive success of Antony Firingee (1967), Kumar paired with Tanuja for the third time in the musical drama Jamuna Ke Teer. It was also to be directed and composed by Sunil Banerjee and Anil Bagchi, marking their further collaboration from the previous film. It was announced on the booklet of 1969 film Maa O Meye, with the same producer Bholanath Roy from B. N. Roy Productions. Later, Tanuja opted out of the film, which consequented its languishment in production hell for two years.

In 1973, the film was re-announced on the booklet of Seemabaddha (1971), with the title changed as Jamuna Ke Teer and had Aparna Sen as Tanuja's replacement. Then it was to be produced under the Piyali Films banner, but failed to commence shoot.

=== Ananda Sangbad ===
Director Hrishikesh Mukherjee planned to make his directorial debut in Bengali cinema with the film Ananda Sangbad in 1967. Loosely inspired by the 1952 Japanese film Ikiru, the film was announced to star Kumar and Raj Kapoor in the leads on the booklet of Tapan Sinha's Hatey Bazarey (1967). The titular character of Ananda was inspired by Kapoor, who used to call Mukherjee "Babu Moshai" ("Big Brother" in Bengali). It is believed that Mukherjee wrote the film when once Kapoor was seriously ill and Mukherjee thought that he may die. The film was dedicated to Kapoor and the people of Bombay. Produced by Ashim Dutta under the banner of Priya Films, Ananda Sangbad was centered upon a terminally ill patient and a doctor, which were respectively to be played by Kapoor and Kumar.

Production on the film stalled in the same year as a result of scheduling conflicts with Kumar, and the film re-emerged with a new title in Hindi. By this time, Mukherjee considered Kishore Kumar and Mehmood (as Babu Moshai) in lead roles, which also fell through. In 1971, the film was reinvented and released as Anand, with Rajesh Khanna in the titular role and Amitabh Bachchan as Babu Moshai.

== 1970s ==
=== Chaitali ===
The film was planned to have Kumar and Tanuja for the third time, after Jamuna Ki Teer got shelved. Later, Kumar never got down to make it because he felt it would not have been cost-effective. Then he was replaced by Biswajeet Chatterjee and the film released in 1971.

=== Kothay Pabo Taare ===
In 1968, Tapan Sinha wanted to adapt a story by Samaresh Basu into a feature film with Kumar in the lead, marking their fourth collaboration after Jatugriha (1964). Later, the film was announced under the title Kothay Pabo Taare on the booklet of Kumar's 1970 film Rajkumari. Produced by Satyasudha Productions, the film was later abandoned due to producer Amal Mukherjee's death.

=== Ekoda Kuashay ===
D. S. Sultania, the producer of Mrinal Sen's Calcutta 71 (1971), was declared to produce the film under Agradoot's direction. Based on a story by Bimal Kar, it was to reflect the starvation of common people during the Naxalite movement in the 70s Kolkata, with Kumar in a unconventional role. Meanwhile, Sultania subsequently ran into financial troubles from a number of his joint ventures, including on a significant deal with businessman Ramoji Rao, and subsequently Ekoda Kuashay with Kumar was stalled.

Three years later, the project was eventually revived by Partha Pratim Chowdhury and released in 1974 as Jadu Bangsha starring Kumar, Sharmila Tagore and Aparna Sen.

=== Kalo Harin Chokh ===
The film was all set for Sushil Majumder’s directorial venture in his second collaboration with Kumar after the 1964 film Lal Pathore, as evidenced by an ad on the reverse of the booklet for Mem Saheb (1972). In this film, the female lead was to played in by Aparna Sen.

=== Chabutara ===
Producer Ajay Bose and director Jayanta Bhattacharya, who was part of the directors' collective known as "Agragami", chose four of Buddhadeb Guha's novels to make into films, all of them starring Kumar. Chabutara is one of them, in which sensationally the duo had cast Rekha opposite him. Reportedly, Amjad Khan was also included in its casting coup, while the film didn't go to floor.

=== Koyeler Kachhe ===
It was reportedly to star Kumar and Amitabh Bachchan together for the first time in a Bengali film, before the 1982 Hindi film Desh Premee. The muhurat of the film took place in Kolkata in 1977, which was also attended by Bachchan. However, the film fell through to be shot.

== 1980s ==
=== Untitled remake of Johny Mera Naam ===
Vijay Anand, the director of the blockbuster Hindi film Johny Mera Naam (1970), showed his interest to remake the film in Bengali with Kumar. K. A. Narayan, the co-writer of the film, was signed to direct the film, while it never materialised.

=== Hobo Itihaash ===
Actor Subhendu Chatterjee was all set to make his directorial debut with the film, from a story of the same name by Anjan Choudhury. Inspired by the political violence in the late 70s, Choudhury conceived its protagonist as a hard-hitting, "angry with the system" policeman. Initially turned down by Soumitra Chatterjee and Samit Bhanja thinking themselves unfit for the role, it eventually went to Kumar, who was persuaded by Choudhury, a big fan of him. Apart from it, Prosenjit Chatterjee was signed to play a grey-shaded character; Utpal Dutt was approached to play the antagonist, while he advised Subhendu Chatterjee to find a new actor to play the role. In spite of several workshops having been taken place for the action sequences, one of which included a high-octane hand-to-hand combat between Kumar and Prosenjit Chatterjee, Kumar himself showed his interest to play the villain instead of the protagonist. At first, both Chatterjee and Choudhury disagreed to his proposal, but later nodded and Ranjit Mallick came on the board as the protagonist.

The shooting of the film was to begin in September 1980, after the completion of Kumar and Mallick's commitments with other films. On 23 July 1980, Kumar had his third time heart attack during the shooting of Ogo Bodhu Shundori (1981), and he died on 24 July at 9:30 pm. After these circumstances, Chatterjee came out of the project and ultimately Hobo Itihaash got shelved. Later in 1983, Choudhury decided to make the film in his directorial debut and renamed the film as Shatru. Ravindra Aggarwal, who gave his consent to produce the film, wanted to do the film in Hindi with Shatrughan Sinha, while Choudhury was at his decision to do it with Mallick. Manoj Mitra played the antagonist in the film, replacing Kumar. The film released in 1984, opening to be a critical and commercial success.

=== Nater Guru ===
Director Dinen Gupta planned to make a film on the basis of Samaresh Basu's short story Nater Guru. As the original story had four major characters, Gupta considered Kumar, Ranjit Mallick, Sandhya Roy and Sharmila Tagore to play those. But the project eventually dropped after Kumar's frequent collaborator Shekhar Chatterjee denied to write its screenplay.

In 2003, director Haranath Chakraborty bought the rights from Basu's son Nabakumar Basu to make the film. Mallick was only retained from the previous cast to replace Kumar. The character which Mallick was to play in the shelved project, was played by Jeet in the latter, while Roy and Tagore were respectively replaced by Moushumi Chatterjee and Koel Mallick, who also made her debut with the film. It released under the same title in the same year, emerging to be a huge commercial success.

=== Haar Manini ===
Director Inder Sen made an adaptation of the 1941 French film Meet John Doe by Frank Capra. He wrote the script keeping Kumar in mind; unlike its original, the film was intended to be made as an action film, titled as Haar Manini. Kumar was narrated to the story by Sen, who also signed the film. But, Sen himself cancelled the film after Kumar's death.

=== Agni Bindu ===
Agni Bindu was based on the infamous Sanchayita chit fund in the late 70s. Directed by Gora Chowdhury, it was shot for two days with Kumar. Later, it was stalled due to his death.

=== Iti Tomar ===
Director Partha Pratim Chowdhury was to collaborate for the second time with Kumar after Jadu Bangsha (1974) with Iti Tomar. Sharmila Tagore was signed opposite Kumar in their sixth pairing after the Hindi film Dooriyan (1979). Produced by Shukla Kanungo, the muhurat of the film took place in February 1980, and filming was to begin in December 1980, which got postponed due to Kumar's death, and Tagore also eventually opted out of it.

In 1984, Chowdhury directed the film titling Pujarini starring Ranjit Mallick and Moon Moon Sen.

=== Agni Trishna ===
Kumar had shot only a day for the film directed by Mrinal Chakraborty, based on a story by Sukhen Das.

=== Til Theke Taal ===
Til Theke Taal was set to feature Kumar and Prosenjit Chatterjee together. Directed by Shantimoy Bandyopadhyay, it was based on a story by Shaktipada Rajguru and produced under the banner of Chirantan Chitra. However, it was stalled due to Kumar's death.

Under the same banner and director, filming began with Dipankar De as Kumar's replacement. It released in 1985 with the same title.

=== Asti Bhagirathir Teere ===
Based on a story by Dr. Nihar Ranjan Gupta, the film was to be directed by Dhruba Das. Starring Kumar and Supriya Devi, the muhurat of Asti Bhagirathir Teere was done, but it got postponed due to its high production costs.

=== Sonai Dighi ===
Gananatya Opera's famous stage production Sonai Dighi, a jatra directed by Dilip Chatterjee and written by Brajendra Kumar Dey, was to be adapted into a film by Ashim Banerjee. Kumar was considered to play the central character named Bhavna Kaji, with Soumitra Chatterjee and Supriya Devi in other pivotal roles. However, it did not came on the board after Kumar's death.

=== Hindi remake of Stree ===
Shakti Samanta planned to remake the 1972 Bengali film Stree into Hindi with Kumar, who was supposed to reprise his role from the original. But after Kumar's death, Samanta signed Sanjeev Kumar in that role and it released as Ayaash in 1982.
