= Lokesh Ghosh =

Bengali film actor

- লোকেশ ঘোষ
- Occupation: Actor
- Known for: Loafer (1997); Asol Nakol (1998); Naach Nagini Naach Re (1996)
- Spouse: Chumki Chowdhury (Divorced)

Lokesh Ghosh is an Indian Bengali actor who is known for his work in Bengali cinema. Ghosh was born and brought up in Mumbai. He began his acting career doing small roles in Bollywood. Ghosh got his break through in the Bengali film industry with Anjan Choudhury's 1996 political drama Mukhyamantri, where he played the role of Ashok, the momentarily spoilt son of the protagonist Bimal Chowdhury (Ranjit Mallick). He was simultaneously cast in Choudhury's other venture of the year Nach Nagini Nach Re where he played the role of Rajat opposite Anjan Choudhury's daughter Chumki Chowdhury. With the massive success of both films, Ghosh became a frequent face in Choudhury's movies like Boro Bou (1997), Sriman Bhootnath (1997), Jiban Niye Khela (1999), Gunda (1999), Rakhi Purnima (2001) and so on. Remaining under Choudhury's wing, he featured in a number of successful collaborations with director Bablu Samaddar; like, Loafer (1996) Asol Nokol (1998) and Neoti (1999). Around early 2000s, Ghosh appeared in a number of films directed by Swapan Saha like Sneher Pratidan (2003), Sabuj Saathi (2003) and Kartabya (2003), most of which starred Prosenjit Chatterjee in the lead.

== Personal life ==
Lokesh Ghosh was born to Producer Debesh Ghosh and actress Ranjana Bannerjee. His father was a big name in both Bengali and Hindi film industries and worked with a number of big names like Amitabh Bachhan, Uttam Kumar, Rekha, Sharmila Tagore and Sanjeev Kumar. His mother is known for her notable contributions in Bengali films like Headmaster, Atal Jaler Ahwan and Hansuli Banker Upakatha. Ghosh studied in St. Paul's School, Darjeeling and St. Xavier's College, Kolkata, following which he travelled to Mumbai where he began his early ventures in the field of acting.

Lokesh Ghosh married his co-star Chumki Chowdhury with whom he has a daughter. However, the couple divorced around 2001. The reason of their divorce is rumoured to be Ghosh' rampant behaviour and addiction to alcohol. Ghosh' career went downhill with the separation, thus, detaching him from the ventures of his father-in-law Anjan Choudhury. With his father's death in 2004, Ghosh travelled to Mumbai and dissociated himself from the industry for a significant amount of time. In his interview with Tolly Time in 2023, Ghosh blamed his own impulsive decisions and unexpected betrayals as the reason for his current inconvenience and his gradual detachment from the film industry.

== Filmography ==
Film	Year of Release	Character	Director
Mukhyamantri	1996	Ashok Chowdhury	Anjan Choudhury
Naach Nagini Naach Re	1996	Rajat	Anjan Choudhury
Sreeman Bhootnath	1997	Loknath	Anjan Choudhury
Matribhumi	1997	Manab	Milan Bhowmik
Loafer	1997	Bikram	Bablu Samaddar
Baro Bou	1997	Atanu	Subhash Sen
Banglar Badhu	1998	Dr. Deepak Gupta	Anup Sengupta
Asol Nakol	1998	Kalidas/Mohan Singh	Bablu Samaddar
Jibon Niye Khela	1999	Runu Chakraborty	Anjan Choudhury
Gunda	1999	Tapan	Anjan Choudhury
Gariber Samman	1999	Shubhro (cameo)	Swapan Saha
Neyoti	1999	Sashinath	Bablu Samaddar
Mastan Raja	1999	Sangram	Uttam Akash
Krishna Kaberi	1999	Kyebla	Pransanta Nanda
Rupashi Dohai Tomar	2000	Arjun	Pallab Ghosh
Gariber Sansar	2000		Swapan Saha
Bidhatar Khela	2001	Surjo	Mohonji Prasad
Shesh Bichar	2001		Sukhen Das
Rakhi Purnina	2001	Abhijit	Anjan Choudhury
Prem Shakti	2002	Kunal	Mohanji Prasad
Pratihinsa	2002		Mohanji Prasad
Inquilaab	2002		Anup Sengupta
Shukh Dukkher Sansar	2003	Subroto Bose	Swapan Saha
Sneher Pratidan	2003	Pradeep	Sawapan Saha
Sabuj Sathi	2003	Bikash Chowdhury	Swapan Saha
Kartabya	2003	Apu	Swapan Saha
Sajani	2004	Gobindo	Swapan Saha
Barood	2004		T.L.V. Prasad
Dadar Aadesh	2005	Kartik Ghosh	Anup Sengupta
Satyameva Jayate	2008	Vinayak's friend	Ashok Kumar Bed
Trishna	2009	S.P. Subir Chatterjee	Pritam Jalan
Mejobabu	2009	Babla	Tutul Bannerjee
Bhalobasa Jug Jug Jio	2009		Dibakar Mandal
Balidaan	2010	Rahul's elder brother	Tutul Banerjee
Bejanma	2010	Anando/Debu	Aashish Mitra
Panch Kayedi	2022	A cop	Tutul Banerjee

== Television ==
- Mama Bhagne
