= Shathe Shathyang =

1982 Indian film by Dinen Gupta

- Directed by: Dinen Gupta
- Screenplay by: Anjan Choudhury; Additional screenplay: Shekhar Chatterjee(uncredited)
- Story by: Anjan Choudhury
- Produced by: Mamata Das
- Starring: Ranjit Mallick; Mahua Roy Chowdhury; Sumitra Mukherjee; Shekhar Chatterjee; Anup Kumar
- Cinematography: Dinen Gupta
- Edited by: Amiyo Mukherjee
- Music by: Dilip Ganguly
- Production company: Jyotirmoy Pictures
- Distributed by: Shree Bishnu Pictures
- Release date: 12 March 1982
- Country: India
- Language: Bengali

Shathe Shathyang (Bengali pronunciation: [ʃɔʈe ʃaʈʰjɔŋ]; transl. Ultimate perfection) is a 1982 Indian Bengali-language action comedy film directed and cinematographed by Dinen Gupta. Produced by Mamata Das under the banner of Jyotirmoy Pictures, the film is based on Anjan Choudhury's serialised story of the same name, published in his weekly magazine Chumki. It stars Ranjit Mallick in dual roles as identical twin brothers, alongside an ensemble cast of Mahua Roy Chowdhury, Sumitra Mukherjee, Shekhar Chatterjee, Anup Kumar, Dilip Roy and Biplab Chatterjee in another pivotal roles.

Gupta bought the original script of Shathe Shathyang from Choudhury, later collaborating with his frequent screenwriting collaborator Shekhar Chatterjee to modify it. The film marks the fifth collaboration between Gupta and Mallick, and also pairs Mallick and Roy Chowdhury for the third time. Music of the film is composed by Dilip Ganguly, with lyrics penned by Pulak Bandyopadhyay, Shibdas Bandyopadhyay and Choudhury.

Shathe Shathyang was theatrically released on 12 March 1982, coinciding with Pohela Baishakh. Opening to positive reviews, the film became a box-office success and emerged as the highest-grossing Bengali film of 1982. The film's soundtrack album, also became a commercial success, with the song "Amar Moto Emon Chhele" topping the charts. It attained a cult status generally for marking Mallick's return to the action genre, after a long time.

== Cast ==
- Ranjit Mallick as
  - Joy, a taxi driver
  - Bijoy, a lispy man
- Mahua Roy Chowdhury as Ritu Chatterjee, Joy's love interest
- Sumitra Mukherjee
- Shekhar Chatterjee as Arun, Joy and Bijoy's maternal uncle
- Anup Kumar as Bhajahari / Bhoju Da
- Dilip Roy as Joy's adoptive maternal uncle
- N. Viswanathan as Mr. Ganguly, Joy and Bijoy's father
- Smita Sinha as Mrs. Ganguly, Joy and Bijoy's mother
- Gita Dey
- Kajal Gupta as Basanti, Joy's adoptive mother
- Biplab Chatterjee

== Soundtrack ==
Shathe Shathyang

Soundtrack album by Dilip Ganguly
- Released: 29 October 1982
- Genre: Feature film soundtrack
- Length: 13:08
- Language: Bengali
- Label: Saregama Bengali
- Producer: Dilip Ganguly

Dilip Ganguly chronology
Khancha (1981)	Shathe Shathyang (1982)	Shatru (1984)
External audio
- Official Audio Jukebox on YouTube

Singles from Shathe Shathyang
- 1. "Amar Moto Emon Chhele"; 2. "Antarjami Tumi To"; 3. "Dhuk Puk Dhuk Puk"; 4. "Paan Peyalay Ekti Chumuk"

The soundtrack of the film is composed by Dilip Ganguly, with lyrics penned by Pulak Bandyopadhyay, Shibdas Bandyopadhyay and Choudhury himself.

Track listing
No.	Title	Lyrics	Singer(s)	Length
1.	"Amar Moto Emon Chhele"	Pulak Bandyopadhyay	Manna Dey, Aarti Mukherjee	3:14
2.	"Antarjami Tumi To"	Pulak Bandyopadhyay	Pratima Bandopadhyay	3:40
3.	"Dhuk Puk Dhuk Puk"	Anjan Choudhury	Manna Dey	3:12
4.	"Paan Peyalay Ekti Chumuk"	Shibdas Bandyopadhyay	Banashree Sengupta	3:02
Total length:				13:08
