= Sankar Guru (1987 film) =

- Tamil poster
- Directed by: L. Raja (Tamil); Raja Naidu (Telugu)
- Based on: Shatru (Bengali film) by Anjan Choudhury
- Screenplay by: V. C. Guhanathan
- Story by: Anjan Choudhury (uncredited); M. Sivachandran
- Produced by: M. Saravanan; M. Balasubramanian; M. S. Guhan
- Starring: Arjun; Seetha; Rajani; Baby Shalini
- Cinematography: Viswam Natraj
- Edited by: R. Vittal; C. Lancy
- Music by: Chandrabose (Tamil); K. Chakravarthy (Telugu)
- Production company: AVM Productions
- Release date: 19 March 1987
- Running time: 127 minutes
- Country: India
- Languages: Tamil; Telugu

Sankar Guru is a 1987 Indian Tamil-language action film, directed by L. Raja and produced by M. Saravanan, M. Balasubramanian and M. S. Guhan via AVM Productions. Adapted from Ranjit Mallick starrer blockbuster Bengali film Shatru (1984), the film was shot simultaneously in Telugu as Chinnari Devatha (transl. Little angel) with Raja Naidu as director. It stars Arjun, Seetha, Rajani and Baby Shalini. The film was released on 19 March 1987, and was commercially successful in both languages.

== Plot ==
In a small village, three brothers Kanagaraj, Ethiraj & Nagaraj hold control with the eldest brother Kanagaraj leading a notorious crime ring. Anyone who dares to defy them faces brutal violence or death. However, the fruit stall owner, Sankarguru / Babu, becomes a reluctant hero when he intervenes in a harrowing incident involving the youngest brother, Nagaraju, who attempts to molest a young school teacher, Rekha. Sankarguru / Babu beats Nagaraju so severely that he requires hospitalization.

Aware of Sankarguru's actions, the second eldest brother Ethiraj schemes to teach him a lesson by framing him for selling illegal arrack. However, a young girl Devi and her monkey companion overhear the plot and inform Sankarguru / Babu. He confronts and defeats the second brother, earning himself a reputation. Tensions rise between Sankarguru / Babu and the brothers when the youngest brother publicly murders a school headmaster who tried to prevent another assault on the teacher Rekha who by now has become the love interest of Sankarguru / Babu.

Learning of this tragedy, Sankarguru / Babu rushes to the scene in a fit of rage, overpowering the brothers and delivering them to the town's police station. To everyone's surprise, it is revealed that Sankarguru / Babu is not merely a fruit stall owner but an undercover police inspector on a special assignment.

Meanwhile, the little girl, having discovered Sankarguru / Babu's true identity, tries to distance herself from him. Sankarguru insists on understanding her reasons and learns about her tragic past. Her parents were victimized by the trio, with her mother being killed and her father falsely framed for the crime, aided by a corrupt policeman. Sankarguru vows to find her father and reunite them.

The remainder of the story revolves around Sankarguru's determination to fulfill his promise to the young girl, as he navigates the corrupt underworld and seeks justice for her family.

== Cast ==
Cast (Tamil)	Cast (Telugu)	Role (Tamil)	Role (Telugu)
Arjun		Inspector Sankar Guru	Inspector Babu
Seetha		Seetha	Seetha
Rajani/Sasikala		Rekha	Rekha
Baby Shalini		Devi	Devi
Sarath Babu		Devi's father	Devi's father
Senthil	Rallapalli	Sub-inspector Karuvayan	Sub-inspector Raju
Senthamarai		Kanagaraj	Kanagaraj
Y. G. Mahendran		Dharmaraj	Dharmaraj
Jeeva		Ethiraj	Ethiraj
Balaji		Nagaraj	Nagaraj
Manorama		Seetha's mother	Seetha's mother
Rajya Lakshmi		Devi's mother	Devi's mother
Pasi Narayanan	Potti Prasad	Police constable	Police constable
Chakravarthy		Police constable	Police constable
Oru Viral Krishna Rao	Sattibabu	Police constable	Police constable
K. K. Soundar	Hema Sundar	School master	School master
Omakuchi Narasimhan (Note: Credited in Telugu as Juttu Narasimham.)		Kanagaraj's assistant	Kanagaraj's assistant
Visu	Mada Venkateswara Rao	Doctor	Doctor

Tamil version

- Senthamarai as Kanagaraj
- Y. G. Mahendran as Dharmaraj
- V. Gopalakrishnan as a police commissioner
- Jeeva as Ethiraj
- Balaji as Nagaraj
- Chakravarthy as a police inspector
- Oru Viral Krishna Rao as a police constable
- Hanumanthu as Seetha's father
- Idichapuli Selvaraj as Kanagaraj's assistant
- Omakuchi Narasimhan as Kanagaraj's assistant

== Production ==
AVM Productions wanted to remake the Bengali film Shatru (1984) in Tamil and Telugu. However, the remake rights proved too expensive, so the idea was dropped. Instead, AVM borrowed two scenes from that film and created a new story, titled Sankar Guru in Tamil and Chinnari Devatha in Telugu. Both versions were filmed simultaneously. The film's story was credited to actor Sivachandran. The song "Kumbakonam" was shot at Mudumalai rivers.

== Soundtrack ==
The music of Sankar Guru was composed by Chandrabose, with lyrics by Vairamuthu. The music of Chinnari Devatha was composed by K. Chakravarthy, with lyrics by Veturi.

Tamil
No.	Title	Singer(s)	Length
1.	"Maadi Veettu Mynar"	Malaysia Vasudevan	4:20
2.	"Enna Pathti Nee"	S. P. Balasubrahmanyam, S. Janaki	4:21
3.	"Kakki Sattai Potta Machan"	Malaysia Vasudevan, S. P. Sailaja	4:33
4.	"Chinna Chinna Poove" (male)	K. J. Yesudas	4:24
5.	"Chinna Chinna Poove" (female)	S. Janaki	4:26
6.	"Kumbakonamey Konam"	Malaysia Vasudevan, K. S. Chithra	5:11
Total length:			27:15

Telugu
No.	Title	Length
1.	"Maa Intipere Anuragam"	4:48
2.	"Gudapah Camo Bojiuaa"	4:17
3.	"Melukuma Devudanta"	4:18
4.	"Kachuko Chalibhada"	4:37
5.	"Nemmadi Nemmadiga"	4:41
6.	"Maa Inti Pere Anurangam"	4:08
Total length:		26:49

== Release and reception ==
Sankar Guru was released on 19 March 1987. The Indian Express called it an "absolutely unpretentious entertainer". Jayamanmadhan of Kalki, despite noting several flaws, appreciated the director for making an entertaining film from beginning to end. The film was commercially successful in both the languages it was made, and Chandrabose won the award for Best Music Director at the 8th Cinema Express Awards.

== Bibliography ==
- Saravanan, M. (2013) [2005]. AVM 60 Cinema (in Tamil) (3rd ed.). Rajarajan Pathippagam. OCLC 1158347612.
