= Shraddhanjali =

1993 Bengali drama film

- Video cover of the film
- Directed by: Sreekanta Guha Thakurta
- Written by: Anjan Choudhury
- Screenplay by: Anjan Choudhury
- Story by: Anjan Choudhury
- Produced by: Bandana Das
- Starring: Ranjit Mullick; Prosenjit Chatterjee; Debashree Roy; Satabdi Roy; Ruma Guha Thakurta; Kali Banerjee; Anup Kumar
- Cinematography: Girish Padiar
- Edited by: Swapan Guha
- Music by: R.D. Burman
- Production company: R.D. Das Films
- Distributed by: Manoranjan Films Distribution
- Release date: 16 April 1993
- Running time: 135 minutes
- Country: India
- Language: Bengali

Shraddhanjali is a 1993 Bengali drama film directed by Sreekanta Guha Thakurta (Note: It was the last film of Sreekanta Guha Thakurta.) and produced by Bandana Das. The story, screenplay and lyrics are penned by Anjan Choudhury. The plot revolves around the three central characters — Amit, Sathi and Bobby. Amit discovers his student Bobby's love for him whereas he is in love with Sathi. Sathi, on the other hand, chooses to stay away from Amit's life as he has the scope to prosper in his life if he marries Bobby. Bobby is as magnanimous as Sathi. She plays her part to reunite Amit and Sathi. The film stars Prosenjit Chatterjee as Amit, Satabdi Roy as Sathi and Debashree Roy as Bobby. It also stars Ranjit Mullick, Kali Banerjee, Ruma Guha Thakurta, Anup Kumar and Aloka Ganguly. The music of the film is composed by R. D. Burman.

The filming began in November 1988. Previously Chumki Chowdhury was cast to portray the role of Sathi alongside Prosenjit Chatterjee and Debashree Roy. It was supposed to be her cinematic debut. The project got shelved and was rescheduled in 1992. Chumki was replaced by Satabdi Roy as the production house wanted to cast someone whose stardom was equivalent to Debashree's stardom. Prior to its release, the film made headlines as Debashree and Satabdi shared the screen for the first time. Subhadeep Banerjee of The Wall describes it to be an 'implausible affair' as it is sometimes impossible to cast two top-billing actresses together in a film. Upon its release, it became the highest-grossing Bengali film of the year.

== Plot ==
Ranjan Banerjee, a renowned businessman feels relieved when he is informed by his wife that his younger daughter Bobby who has androphobia, has finally agreed to take tuition from a young male tutor named Amit. Ranjan later discovers that Bobby is in love with Amit. When Amit comes to his place, he tells him that he is indirectly responsible for Bobby's androphobia; his elder daughter Chobi fell in love with Bikash, her home tutor but he refused to approve their marriage as Bikash did not belong to a well-to-do family. He instead compelled Chobi to marry a wealthy man. Chobi was later subjected to domestic violence. To end her distress, she killed herself having left a letter to Bobby explaining why she resolved to kill herself. Her death led to Bobby's androphobia. Ranjan tells Amit that he does not want to make the same blunder again and expresses his gratitude for Amit as the latter has been able to woo Bobby's heart despite her androphobia. He proposes him to be his personal assistant in his company. Amit does not reveal that he is in love with another woman named Sathi as he fears losing his job. He is torn between his love for Sathi and his obligation towards his family. His elder brother Sumit advises him to be truthful and marry to Sathi whereas Chandra, Sumit's wife warns him that he will lose his job if he refuses to marry Bobby.

Chandra meets Sathi and tells her that Amit intends to prosper in his life and his marital relationship with Bobby is indispensable for his prosperity. She lies to her that Amit has sent her to know if Sathi would relieve him of the stressful courtship between them. Sathi is now severely heartbroken. She writes a letter to Amit and hands it over to Chandra who keeps it inside Amit's diary. Amit goes to Bobby's place, but finds her absent. He unknowingly drops Sathi's letter there. When Bobby returns, she finds it left in her room. She feels inquisitive and opens it. When she goes through Sathi's letter, she learns that Sathi intends to quit her courtship with Amit as she thinks that Amit's prosperity is conditioned to his marital relationship with Bobby. When Amit return to get Sathi's letter, she does not reveal that she has already gone through it.

Amit visits Sathi and learns of Chandra's falsification. He tells her that he intends to leave Ranjan Banerjee's company and marry her. He visits Ranjan to confess that he is unable to marry Bobby and intends to resign. Ranjan feels aghast and interrogates if Bobby is aware of his decision. Bobby confesses that she is aware of this as she has read Sathi's letter. She tears Amit's resignation letter as she validates Amit's love for Sathi.

Ranjan visits Sathi and requests her to leave Amit to Babby. Sathi, along with her mother abandons her place leaving a message for Amit that she will kill herself if he does not marry Bobby. Later she comes across a newspaper photo of the wedding between the duo. When she meets Bobby, she learns that the photo was a hoax to cause her to return. Upon Bobby's insistence, Sathi agrees to marry Amit. When they come to visit Bobby after their wedding, they discover that Bobby has killed herself. Upon Sathi's insistence, Amit now smudges vermilion powder along the part of Bobby's hairline to honour her sacrifice.

== Cast ==
- Ranjit Mallick as Ranjan Banerjee
- Prosenjit Chatterjee as Amit
- Debashree Roy as Bobby
- Satabdi Roy as Sathi
- Ruma Guha Thakurta as Sathi's Mother
- Kali Banerjee as Amit's father
- Anup Kumar as Sumit
- Aloka Ganguly as Chandra
- Jui Roy as Bobby's Mother
- Ananda Mukherjee (Cameo) as Ranjan Banerjee's doorkeeper
- Chandralal Chowdhury (Note: He is better known as Chandu Chowdhury.) as Mr. Chowdhury: An employee in Ranjan Banerjee's company
- Meena Chakraborty
- Puja Chatterjee

== Production ==
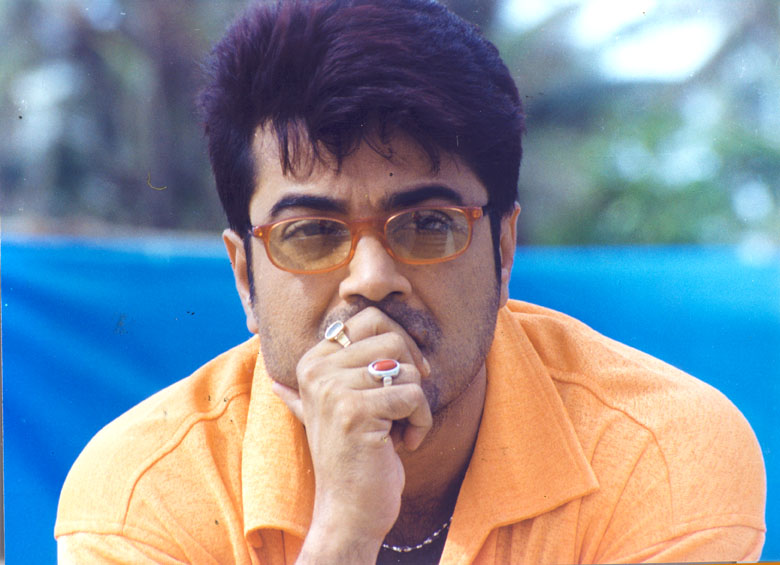
Prosenjit Chatterjee is accredited for his masterly collaboration with the two female superstars of the era.

After Gurudakshina (1987), Anjan Choudhury penned the screenplay of Shraddhanjali and Sreekanta Guha Thakurta was insisted to direct the project. Chumki Chowdhury was finalized to portray the role of Sathi, alongside Prosenjit Chatterjee portraying Amit and Debashree Roy portraying Bobby. The muhurat shot took place on 18 November 1988 at NT Studio No.1. Chatterjee in the meantime refused to star opposite Chumki in Anjan Choudhury's directorial venture Hirok Jayanti, which infuriated Choudhary who in turn refused to hand the script over to Sreekanta. The project was then shelved. Later Anup Kumar and Utpal Dutt intervened and it was rescheduled in 1992.

After the film was rescheduled, the production house wanted another actress to portray Sathi. The production house wanted an actress whose stardom was equivalent to Debashree's stardom. Sreekanta Guha Thakurta then requested Prosenjit to convince Satabdi Roy to accept the role of Sathi. Sanghamitra Bandyopadhyay who was supposed to play the role of Chandra, was replaced by Aloka Ganguly. Sreekanta Guha Thakurta remoulded Chandra's character with a tinge of selfishness. He no longer wanted the role to be out-and-out villainous. He felt that Aloka Ganguly would be able to do justice to the role.
