= Mukhyamantri (film) =

1996 film

- Directed by: Anjan Choudhury
- Starring: Ranjit Mallick; Dulal Lahiri; Lokesh Ghosh; Tota Roy Chowdhury; Chumki Chowdhury; Ashok Kumar; Debika Mitra
- Music by: Mrinal Bandhyopadhay
- Production company: Maa Kali Chitramandir
- Release date: 1996
- Country: India
- Language: Bengali

Mukhyamantri (transl. Chief Minister) is a 1996 Bengali political drama film directed by Anjan Choudhury. This film's music was composed by Mrinal Bandhyopadhay.

== Plot ==
Circumstances force Bimal, a righteous headmaster who is well known in his village, to contest the local elections. An envious MLA teams up with the chief minister to plot against him.

== Cast ==
- Ranjit Mallick
- Dulal Lahiri
- Lokesh Ghosh
- Tota Roy Chowdhury
- Chumki Chowdhury
- Ashok Kumar
- Gyanesh Mukherjee
- Debika Mitra
- Rina Choudhury
- Sumanta Mukherjee
- Arun Bandyopadhyay
