= Nishantay =

- নিশান্তে
- Directed by: Narayan Chakraborty
- Written by: Samaresh Basu
- Starring: Subhendu Chatterjee; Tapas Paul; Debashree Roy; Dipankar Dey; Santosh Dutta
- Cinematography: Girish Padhiar
- Music by: Ashima Mukhopadhyay
- Release date: 1985
- Running time: 130 minutes
- Country: India
- Language: Bengali

Nishantay is a Bengali romance drama film directed by Narayan Chakraborty based on the novel of Bengali author Samaresh Basu. The film was released on 20 October 1985 under the banner of J. Uttam Industries.

== Plot ==
The film revolves with three friends, their love and relationship in the traditional and patriarchal society.

== Cast ==
- Tapas Paul
- Debashree Roy
- Mamata Shankar
- Subhendu Chatterjee
- Dipankar Dey
- Santosh Dutta
- Alpana Goswami
- Meenakshi Goswami
- Smita Sinha
- Nirmal Ghosh
