= Santrash =

- DVD cover
- Directed by: Narayan Roy
- Written by: Anjan Choudhury; Narayan Roy
- Produced by: Ranjana Roy, Shivprakash Sharma
- Starring: Mithun Chakraborty; Madhabi Mukherjee; Ranjit Mallick
- Music by: Bidyut Goswami
- Release date: 2003
- Running time: 125 minutes
- Country: India
- Language: Bengali

Santrash (Terror) is a 2003 Indian Bengali-language action thriller film co written and directed by Narayan Roy, starring Mithun Chakraborty, Madhabi Mukherjee, and Ranjit Mallick.

== Plot ==
The film is a fast-paced thriller, with Mithun in the lead. Rajib is a corrupt minister and terrorizes the city. His goons kill Shubhankar's brother and also kill the lone witness. Tormented, Shubhankar searches for a man who can fight Rajib

== Cast ==
- Mithun Chakraborty as Montu
- Usasi Misra
- Ranjit Mallick
- Madhabi Mukherjee as Montu's Mother
- Locket Chatterjee as Locket
- Narayan Roy as Chayan
- Pushpita Banerjee
- Rahul Barman as Ratan
- Raja Chattopadhyay
- Rimita Roy
- Mrinal Mukherjee as Minister Rajib Chowdhury
- Jayanta Dutta Barman As Rajiv
- Mrityun Hazra as Kidnapper
- Debnath Chaterjee
- Chandu Chowdhury
