= Shatru (1986 film) =

Shatru / Birodh
- Promotional poster
- Directed by: Pramod Chakravorty
- Produced by: Pramod Chakravorty; Habibur Rahman Khan
- Starring: Rajesh Khanna; Shabana Sadique; Prem Chopra; Ashok Kumar; Raj Kiran; Arun Govil; Om Shivpuri; Sudhir; Mac Mohan
- Cinematography: V. K. Murthy
- Music by: R.D.Burman
- Release date: 15 August 1986
- Countries: Bangladesh; India
- Languages: Bengali; Hindi

Shatru (transl. Enemy) is a 1986 Indo-Bangladesh joint venture action drama film. The original language was Hindi and released in Bengali-language as Birodh in Bangladesh. It is starring Rajesh Khanna in the lead where he plays an inspector in a remote village. The film was an Indo-Bangladeshi venture and the music was written by R.D. Burman. It was a remake of the 1984 west Bengali film of the same name directed by Anjan Choudhury. Shatru in Hindi was an average success as it was released without any publicity.

== Plot ==
Haridaspur is a village where Ashok Sharma was assigned as an Inspector. When he arrived at the remote village, he rescued a blind man and a widow. Ashok then got into a fist fight with Nishikant Shah and his men. The next day, Shah finds out the person with whom his men fought was Ashok himself. In order to make amends with Ashok, he decides to pay him a visit of reconciliation. Ashok refuses. After a series of events transpired, Ashok learns of the misdeeds carried out by Nishikant Shah and MLA Gopal Choudhary. Ashok then realized he had to help the people of the village from being exploited by rich men. Meanwhile, he started living in the village as a paying guest at the house of a girl named Asha. Ashok grew fond of an orphan child from the village named Chotu while in the village. Ashok then learned that Chotu's father had been a loyal farmer who was taken advantage of and killed by Nishikant's associates. Chotu promised he would avenge the evils he heard about while in the village. Shah and his friend Choudhry devised a plot against Ashok, which ultimately resulted in him being perceived as a bad person. Shah and Choudhry manipulated the situation to make it seem as though Ashok was responsible for the death of a man in his custody. This led to Ashok losing his job and his good reputation.

== Cast ==
- Rajesh Khanna as Inspector Ashok Sharma
- Raj Kiran as Raj Choudhry
- Arun Govil as Sub-Inspector Salim
- Shabana Sidique as Asha
- Komal Mahuvakar as the professor's granddaughter
- Prem Chopra as Nishikant Shah
- Subhodip Roy Chowdhury as Chotu
- Ashok Kumar as Superintendent of Police
- Om Shivpuri as Gopal Choudhry, MLA
- Mac Mohan as Kanu
- Anup Kumar as Inspector Anup Chatterjee
- Hasan Imam as Professor
- Golam Mustafa as a corrupted police officer
- Nuton as Dancer
- Biplab Chatterjee as Abdul
- Sajjan

== Music ==
Lyrics: Anand Bakshi

- "Iski Topi Uske Sar" - Kishore Kumar
- "Tere Aanchal Mein" - Lata Mangeshkar
- "Babuji Dil Loge" - Asha Bhosle
- "Main Teraa Bismil Hoon" - Andrew Kishore
- "Sooraj Chandaa Saagar Parbat" - Andrew Kishore & Chorus
