= Kabita =

1977 Indian Bengali drama film

- VCD cover of movie Kabita
- Directed by: Bharat Shumsher Jung Bahadur Rana
- Screenplay by: Bharat Shumsher Jung Bahadur Rana
- Dialogues by: Bharat Shumsher Jung Bahadur Rana
- Story by: M. S. Perumal
- Based on: Aval Oru Thodar Kathai (1974) (Tamil) by K. Balachander
- Produced by: Krishnamurthy; Govindarajan
- Starring: Mala Sinha; Ranjit Mallick; Kamal Haasan; Sandhya Roy
- Cinematography: K. A. Reza
- Edited by: Amiyo Mukherjee
- Music by: Salil Chowdhury
- Production company: Venus Combines
- Distributed by: Piyali Pictures
- Release date: 26 August 1977
- Running time: 146 minutes
- Country: India
- Language: Bengali

Kabita is a 1977 Indian Bengali-language drama film co-written and directed by Bharat Shumsher Jung Bahadur Rana. Produced by Krishnamurthy and Govindarajan under the banner of Venus Combines, the film is a remake of Tamil film Aval Oru Thodar Kathai (1974) by K. Balachander. It stars Mala Sinha in the titular role, alongside Ranjit Mallick, Sandhya Roy and Kamal Haasan in lead roles, while Mahua Roy Chowdhury, Sulata Chowdhury, Prema Narayan and Bankim Ghosh play another pivotal roles, with Bikash Roy, Anil Chatterjee and Samit Bhanja in special appearances. The film plots Kabita, a working middle-class woman, who sacrifices her desires to support her large family.

Salil Chowdhury composed the music and wrote the lyrics for the songs. The cinematography was handled by K. A. Reza, while Amiyo Mukherjee edited the film. The film marks Haasan's debut and only foray in Bengali cinema, while he had portrayed the same character from the original.

Kabita theatrically released on 26 August 1977 to positive reviews. It ran for over 28 weeks in theatres and the songs of the film was chartbuster upon its release. It generally gained a cult status among the Bengali audiences. In 2003, it was remade in Bangladeshi as Kokhono Megh Kokhono Brishti.

== Cast ==
- Mala Sinha as Kabita Ray
- Kamal Haasan as Gopal Menon
- Ranjit Mallick as Tilak
- Anil Chatterjee
- Samit Bhanja as Shekhar
- Mahua Roychoudhury as Sumati
- Sandhya Roy as Bharati
- Bikash Ray as Baba
- Sulata Chowdhury
- Satindra Bhattacharya
- Bankim Ghosh
- Kamu Mukhopadhyay
- Shamita Biswas
- Bimal Deb
- Prema Narayan as Chandra
- Kabita Panday

== Songs ==
Kabita

Soundtrack album by Salil Chowdhury
- Released: 1977
- Genre: Feature film soundtrack
- Length: 26:10
- Language: Bengali
- Label: EMI
External audio
- Audio Jukebox on YouTube

Track list
| No. | Title | Lyrics | Singer(s) | Length |
|---|---|---|---|---|
| 1. | "Shuno Shuno Go Sabe" | Salil Chowdhury | Kishore Kumar | 7:30 |
| 2. | "Bujhbe Na Keu Bujhbe Na" | Salil Chowdhury | Lata Mangeshkar | 4:37 |
| 3. | "Dhyat Teri Maro Goli" | Salil Chowdhury | Sabita Chowdhury | 4:09 |
| 4. | "Ami To Kumir Dhare Anini" | Salil Chowdhury | Manna Dey | 6:36 |
| 5. | "Hothat Bhishon Bhalo Lagchhe" | Salil Chowdhury | Lata Mangeshkar | 3:18 |
| Total length: | | | | 26:10 |
