= Akai Aaksho =

- Theatrical release poster
- Directed by: Babu Ray
- Written by: Anjan Choudhury
- Story by: Anjan Choudhury
- Produced by: Bengal Film 2004
- Starring: Prasenjit Chatarji Rochana Banarji Sandha Roy
- Cinematography: Supriyo Roy
- Edited by: Swapan Guha
- Music by: Bappi Lahiri
- Release date: 10 February 2006
- Running time: 150 minutes
- Country: India
- Language: Bengali

Akai Aaksho is a 2006 Bengali action drama film directed by Babu Ray and produced by Bengal Film 2004. The film features actors Prosenjit Chatterjee and Rachana Banerjee in the lead roles. Music of the film has been composed by Bappi Lahiri.

== Cast ==
- Prosenjit Chatterjee as Ratan (Auto driver)
- Rachna Banerjee as Jhilik Roy (Pradip's daughter)
- Sandhya Roy as Ratan's mother
- Dipankar Dey as Pradip Roy (A corrupt MLA)
- Mrinal Mukherjee as Shiraj Chacha (Garage owner)
- Pushpita Mukherjee as Rumu (Ratan's sister)
- Rajesh Sharma as Noche Choudhury (Local goon)
- Bharat Kaul as Tapan (Ratan's brother)
- Raja Chattopadhyay as Swapan (Ratan's brother)
- Tathoi Deb
- Sudip Mukherjee as OC, a henchman of Pradip Roy
- Moushumi Saha as a teacher and caretaker of an old orphanage home.
