= Meenakshi Goswami =

Indian film actress

Meenakshi Goswamyi
- Born: 21 May 1933; Allahabad, British India
- Died: 8 April 2012 (aged 78); Kolkata, West Bengal, India
- Occupation: Actress
- Years active: 1980–2012
- Parents: Sudhir Chandra Choudhury (father); Pusparani Choudhury (mother)

Meenakshi Goswami was an Indian actress who works mainly in Bengali cinema. mainly as supporting actress. She has worked in movies like Ogo Badhu Sundari, Dui Pata, Amar Geeti, Samrat O Sundari, Chhoto Bou, Swet Patharer Thala. She is particularly known for her role as an abusive mother-in-law. Beside acting on films she has also directed a series of water ballet in the year 2000. She has also acted in Radio Drama and Television serials. She has directed television serial “Kolkatar Kache”.

== Early life ==
Meenakshi Goswami was born on 21 May 1933 in Allahabad, Uttar Pradesh, She studied at the Jagattaran Intermediate School in 1950 and later at the Allahabad University in the year 1954. She was a good athlete ( Volleyball Player and Swimmer ) in her younger days, She visited Russia for this purpose and was a member of Allahabad University Volleyball team. Later she joined peoples little theatre (PLT) in the year 1980, She learnt dancing from Sadhan Guha and Athinlal Ganguly.

== Filmography ==
1. Alayer Alo (2013)
2. Lajja (2010)
3. Streer Maryada (2002)
4. Baba Keno Chakar (1998)
5. Chowdhury Paribar (1998)
6. Ganga (1998)
7. Prem Joware (1997)
8. Jiban Yoddha (1995)
9. Kalpurush (1994)
10. Maya Mamata (1993)
11. Mayabini (1992)
12. Swet Patharer Thala (1992)
13. Idiot (1992)
14. Nilimaye Nil (1991)
15. Jowar Bhata (1990)
16. Ghorer Bou (1990)
17. Chhotobou (1988)
18. Pratikar (1987)
19. Samrat O Sundari (1987)
20. Shyamsaheb (1986)
21. Nishantay (1985)
22. Amargeeti (1984)
23. Duti Pata (1983)
24. Tanaya (1983)
25. Aparupa (1982)
26. Meghmukti (1982)
27. Ogo Badhu Sundari (1981)
28. Dakshayagna (1980)

== Television ==
1. Ei Norodeha
