= Shatru (1984 film) =

Indian Bengali-language action crime film

- Theatrical poster
- Directed by: Anjan Choudhury
- Screenplay by: Anjan Choudhury
- Dialogues by: Anjan Choudhury
- Story by: Anjan Choudhury
- Produced by: Ravindra Aggarwal; Ramkrishna Aggarwal
- Starring: Ranjit Mallick; Manoj Mitra; Subhodip Roy Chowdhury; Shakuntala Barua; Anup Kumar; Chiranjeet Chakraborty; Bikash Roy; Prosenjit Chatterjee; Mahua Roy Chowdhury
- Cinematography: Bijoy Ghosh
- Edited by: Baidyanath Chatterjee
- Music by: Songs: Dilip-Dilip; Background score: V. Balsara
- Production company: Shanti Films Corporations Pvt. Ltd.
- Distributed by: Kranti Films
- Release date: 7 December 1984
- Running time: 132 minutes
- Country: India
- Language: Bengali

Shatru (Bengali pronunciation: [ʃətru]; transl. Enemy) is a 1984 Bengali-language action crime film written and directed by Anjan Choudhury in his directorial debut. Produced by Ravindra Aggarwal and Ramkrishna Aggarwal under the banner of Shanti Films Corporation, the film is based on Choudhury's own serialised story Hobo Itihaash, published for his edited weekly magazine Chumki. It stars Ranjit Mallick, Manoj Mitra, Shakuntala Barua and Subhodip Roy Chowdhury in lead roles, while Anup Kumar, Chiranjeet Chakraborty, Bikash Roy, Biplab Chatterjee and Nirmal Ghosh play another pivotal roles, with Dilip Roy, Prosenjit Chatterjee, Mahua Roy Chowdhury and Jayshree T in special appearances.

Initially titled after the original story, the film marks the first of the frequent collaborations between Choudhury and Mallick. It is also the only collaboration between Choudhury and Chiranjeet Chakraborty, with making the cinematic debut of Subhodip Roy Chowdhury, credited in the film as Master Tapu. Songs of the film are composed by Dilip-Dilip, while V. Balsara provided its score. The cinematography of the film is handled by Bijoy Ghosh and editing was by Baidyanath Chatterjee.

Shatru was theatrically released on 7 December 1984, after a lengthy battle of the makers with the Central Board of Film Certification over a few scenes in the film that allegedly glorified violence. Opening to huge positive reviews, the film became a blockbuster at the box-office and ran for over 90 weeks in theatres. Gaining a cult status in the history of Bengali cinema, Shatru established Mallick's new image of "Pratibadi Nayak". The character Subhankar Sanyal played by him, was later reused by Choudhury in Jibon Niye Khela (1999), one of their later collaborations.

Shatru was remade under the same title into Hindi by Pramod Chakravorty in 1986, starring Rajesh Khanna. In 2011, it was felicitated in and cited to be an inspiration by Raj Chakraborty for his directorial Shotru starring Jeet.

== Plot ==
In Haridebpur, Nishikanta Saha, a businessman also known as "The terror of the village", is honoured through fear by the villagers. On a par with the Tatas and Birlas due to his wealth, Nishikanta is closely involved in various political corruptions in addition to his smuggling business. From confiscating crops from farmlands, storing rations and baby food in secret warehouses, to running the black market in kerosene and country liquor business — he roams freely in each fields. Even though the people of the village are aware of his incomes, they are scared of speaking out against him. He has established his local liquor shops on the account of the hard-working villagers' enjoyment at the rest of the day. Instead to escape the law, he lured the policemen at the local police station with bribes; Among them, SI Haradhan Banerjee works as his informer in exchange for extra money.

One day in the village market square, a blind beggar unknowingly comes in front of Nishikanta's jeep in order to collect his dropped money which he earned from his alms. Nishikanta, who was on his journey to visit MLA Nihar Chowdhury, orders his assistant Abdul to push the beggar off the road, and he does so. While the frightened crowd is enjoying this scene, a widow named Asha, comes forward and protests alone Abdul's behaviour. As a result, Abdul tries to coerce Asha in front of everyone, and Nishikanta orders him to bring Asha to the jeep. All on a sudden, a stranger emerges from the crowd and hits Abdul, saving the blind beggar and Asha. Nishikanta's other henchmen including Abdul, also jump on him, but the man beat everyone up in a hurry. In anger, Nishikanta praises his bravery and expresses surprise asking his identity. The stranger also replies that he will be seen in the village everyday from then on. Nishikanta reaches Nihar's residence and makes him know about the new Officer-in-Charge's about to arrive in Haridebpur Police Station that very day. He discusses with him how to bring the upcoming officer on their side, as he is a tyrant and doesn't take bribe, as per Haradhan's information. Haradhan further had warned him that the OC, whose name is Subhankar Sanyal, wherever had been posted before, criminals had to stayed away from crime out of fear of him; for this reason, he was even called "Bhayankar Sanyal" among people.

Although Nihar mocks the matter of police not taking bribes, Nishikanta maintains his apprehension and decides to try once bribing him. He along with Abdul, arrives at the police station with garland to welcome the OC. There he launches a complaint by revealing the news of the incident that occurred in the market to Haradhan. He then takes them into the OC's room and introduces Nishikanta in front of the OC. Both Nishikanta and Abdul were shocked to see OC Subhankar, because he was the stranger whom Nishikanta had come to complain about, considering him a "goon". Feeling ashamed and embarrassed, Nishikanta goes to put the garland on Subhankar, but he refuses and sarcastically says that after coming to Haridebpur, he has realized that it is impossible to survive in a village with a social worker like Nishikanta for long. In retaliation, Nishikanta also instructs Abdul to store the garland in his freeze and sprinkle water on it every day, so that Subhankar can be given a farewell reception. Subhankar also makes him aware that when he will leave the village, he will put handcuffs on Nishikanta's hands, before being put the garland on himself by Nishikanta.

Sub-inspector Alok was aware of the probable danger that the O.C could face on his way back home and warned him. O.C found Nishi's follower Abdul following him. The next day O.C got a complaint against the MLA's son who had harassed a school master's grand daughter. Nishikanto planned to kill the O.C and sent Abdul for the porpose. But OC caught Abdul and locked him in the police station. Nishi tried to bribe the OC for releasing Abdul but failed. OC gradually came to know about Nishi's alcohol business. One day the OC captured Bapi when he was teasing a girl. MLA threatened OC to release him but he did not give in to MLA's power. One night OC met Chottu, who threw stones at him, and learnt about Chottu's resentment towards the police. OC asked Alok about Chottu's father, Paran's case. Alok explained the unnatural death of Paran. OC and Alok plan to capture Paran's murderer by releasing Abdul but failed as the news was leaked by Haradhan to Nishi. Abdul was killed and the OC was blamed as the murderer. Then with SP's cooperation, OC determined to prove himself innocent within 48 hours of suspension. Haradhan again tried to cheat the police but was caught by the OC. Before getting fired from his job Haradhan realised his sin and helped the OC to prove that Nishikanta was the real criminal responsible for Paran's murder. Nishi was arrested by the OC.

== Cast ==
- Ranjit Mallick as Subhankar Sanyal, the officer-in-charge of Haridebpur
- Manoj Mitra as Nishikanta Saha
- Shakuntala Barua as Asha
- Subhodip Roy Chowdhury (credited as Master Tapu) as Chhottu
- Anup Kumar as SI Haradhan Banerjee
- Chiranjeet Chakraborty as ASI Alok Chakraborty
- Bikash Roy as Nihar Ranjan Chowdhury, MLA of Haridebpur
- Biplab Chatterjee as Abdul, Nishikanta's right hand-man
- Nirmal Ghosh as Paran Mondal, Chhottu's father and a farmer formerly worked for Nishikanta
- Shambhu Bhattacharya as the former officer-in-charge of Haridebpur
- Sandeep Choudhury (credited as Master Sandeep) as Laltu, Chhottu's friend
- Chumki Choudhury as Madhu's friend
- Rina Choudhury as Nihar's daughter and Bapi's sister
- Debnath Chatterjee as Bhola, Subhankar's servant
- Jiban Guha as Kalu, Nishikanta's henchman
- Samir Mukherjee as Madan, Nishikanta's henchman
- Keshab Banerjee

=== Special appearance ===
- Dilip Roy as SP
- Prosenjit Chatterjee as Bapi, Nihar's son
- Mahua Roy Chowdhury as Madhu
- Jayshree T as dancer in the song "Naksha Koro Naa Raja"

== Production ==
=== Development ===
When Anjan Choudhury was working as a film critic and journalist for his own weekly magazine Chumki (titled after his elder daughter's name), he serially published his first two stories in 1979. One of these was Hobo Itihaash, inspired by the political violence in the late 70s, which caught Subhendu Chatterjee's attention. Then Chatterjee decided to make his directorial debut by adapting it and approached Choudhury to be associated with the film as its screenwriter. Choudhury, who had already made his debut as a screenwriter in the 1977 film Teer Bhanga Dheu, agreed to Chatterjee's proposal. At a time when political films in Bengali cinema were made in dramatic nature excluding Pijush Basu's Bagh Bondi Khela (1975), Chatterjee saw the script as potentially groundbreaking and planned to treat it as an action film, whereas the story was written as a crime film and protagonist Subhankar Sanyal was conceived as a hard-hitting, "angry with the system" policeman.

However, both Chatterjee and Choudhury were struggling to find an actor for the lead "angry young man" role, which was turned down by Soumitra Chatterjee and Samit Bhanja, as both of them found themselves to be improper. Despite having proper physique, Soumitra Chatterjee, whom the role was first offered, disagreed to sign the film because of his commitments with other projects as the film needed a lot of workshops especially for the action sequences. Eventually, it went to Uttam Kumar, who was persuaded by Choudhury, a big fan of the former. Later, they planned to bring Suchitra Sen as its female lead, denoting her comeback after Pronoy Pasha (1978) and also the return of her pair with Kumar, five years after Priyo Bandhobi (1975). But Sen, who was in a hiatus then, turned down the offer as the character didn't impressed him and also it was a widow, which she disagreed to play. Then Shakuntala Barua was roped in that role.

Mithun Chakraborty was offered an important character by Kumar's advice, and Prosenjit Chatterjee was signed to play a negative character, both of whom were then acting and working as an assistant director under Kumar's supervision respectively in his directorial Kalankini Kankabati (1981), while Chakraborty later came out of it and was replaced by Santu Mukherjee. Utpal Dutt was approached to play the antagonist, while he advised Subhendu Chatterjee to find a new actor to play the role. In spite of several workshops having been taken place for the action sequences, one of which included a high-octane hand-to-hand combat between Kumar and Prosenjit Chatterjee, Kumar himself showed his interest to play the villain instead of the protagonist. At first, both Chatterjee and Choudhury disagreed to his proposal, but later nodded and Ranjit Mallick came on the board as the protagonist.

The shooting of the film was to begin in September 1980, after the completion of Uttam Kumar and Ranjit Mallick's commitments with other films. On 23 July 1980, Kumar had his third time heart attack during the shooting of Ogo Bodhu Shundori (1981), and he died on 24 July at 9:30 pm. After these circumstances, Chatterjee came out of the project and ultimately Hobo Itihaash got shelved. Later in 1983, Anjan Choudhury decided to make the film in his directorial debut and renamed the film as Shatru. Ravindra Aggarwal, who gave his consent to produce the film, wanted to do the film in Hindi with Shatrughan Sinha, while Choudhury was at his decision to do it with Mallick.

== Soundtrack ==
Songs of the film are composed by Dilip Ganguly and Dilip Basu of the music director duo Dilip-Dilip, while background score is provided by V. Balsara, in his first collaboration with Anjan Choudhury. The album contains three songs and a score, penned by Choudhury himself and Pulak Bandyopadhyay.

Track listing
No.	Title	Lyrics	Music	Singer(s)	Length
1.	"Theme of Shatru (instrumental)"		V. Balsara		2:10
2.	"Bol Bol Bol Bol Naa Tupi Kake Porai"	Anjan Choudhury	Dilip-Dilip	Amit Kumar	4:35
3.	"Naksha Koro Naa Go Raja"	Pulak Bandyopadhyay	Dilip-Dilip	Haimanti Shukla	4:08
4.	"Bolo Naa Go Kar Maa Tumi"	Anjan Choudhury	Dilip-Dilip	Aarti Mukherjee	3:52
Total length:					14:45

== Remake ==
After making the directorial debut in Bengali cinema through Teen Murti (1984), Pramod Chakravorty planned to make another venture bilingually in Bengali and Hindi. He wanted to adapt Vikramaditya's 1977 Bengali novel Double Agent, collaborating with Amitabh Bachchan for the second time after Nastik (1983). Bachchan, who had already made his Bengali debut in Shakti Samanta's Anusandhan (1981), nodded to Chakravorty's proposal. However, Vikramaditya declined to sell the adaptation rights of his novel to Chakravorty, so the idea was dropped. Later, Chakravorty watched Shatru, when it already had been a massive hit. He showed his interest to remake it bilingually. When Bachchan was approached for the role, he apprehended it to be a flop in West Bengal, whereas Anusandhan was a big success there. Then he came out of the project and Rajesh Khanna replaced him in that role. This time, Khanna also felt the same thing Bachchan did, and also faced difficulties to pronounce Bengali. Then Chakravorty had to cancel the idea making bilingual project, and it was finalized to be filmed in Hindi only. Later, it released in under the same name in 1986. Made with a high-production cost, it proved to be a box-office failure.

AVM Productions wanted to remake Shatru simultaneously in Tamil and Telugu with Kamal Haasan and Krishna respectively. However, the remake rights proved too expensive, and the idea was dropped. Instead, AVM borrowed two scenes from the original film and created a new story, titled Sankar Guru in Tamil and Chinnari Devatha in Telugu. Both versions were filmed simultaneously. Both the films' stories were credited to actor M. Sivachandran.
