= Rina Choudhury =

Indian actress

- Born: Kolkata, India
- Occupation: Actress, Director, Writer
- Spouse: Rahul Goswami
- Parent(s): Anjan Choudhury (father); Joysree Choudhury (mother)
- Relatives: Chumki Chowdhury (sister)

Rina Choudhury is an Indian actress, director and writer associated with Bengali Cinema, best known for her portrayals of a vivacious and forthright girl in the 1990s. Under the mentorship of her father, the esteemed filmmaker Anjan Choudhury, her illustrious career in Bengali Cinema began as a child actor in the 1984 blockbuster Shatru starring Ranjit Mallick. She then played a minor role in the 1992 film Maya Mamata starring veteran actress Sabitri Chatterjee and Rina's elder sister Chumki Chowdhury in the titular roles. However, Rina Choudhury's breakthrough as a leading lady came with the film Geet Sangeet, where she played the character of Rekha, the pampered and obstinate daughter of a rich businessman. In this 1994 film, Rina shared screen with some of the most popular actors of Bengali Cinema, like Ranjit Mallick, Sabitri Chatterjee, Subhendu Chatterjee, Abhishek Chatterjee and her elder sister Chumki Choudhury. The 1996 film Puja also marks a significant milestone in her acting career where she played the titular character of a faithful and devoted maid with a rebellious forthright attitude. Her career is distinguished by a array of memorable performances in films like Mejobou, Sriman Bhootnath, Mukhyamantri and Lofer, most of which were produced by Anjan Choudhury.

Apart from her acting ventures, Rina Choudhury is also a film director and writer. She also appeared in the Bengali serial Erao Sotru in Zee Bangla.

== Personal life ==
Rina Choudhury was born to director Anjan Choudhury and his wife Jaysree Choudhury in 1974. She is the second of three siblings, born to a family of accomplished artists. Her elder sister, Chumki Choudhury, is a distinguished actress in the Bengali film industry, while her younger brother, the late Sandip Choudhury, followed in their father's footsteps as a director.

Rina married actor Rahul Goswami, who she met while shooting for the folk theatre play Shvadhin Bharote Poradhin Bhalobasha. The couple has a daughter.

Rina has often expressed her love for writing and directing films based on her own stories. Rina is presently working on her directorial venture Sohag Raat.

== Filmography ==
● Shatru (1984)

● Maya Mamata (1993)

● Abbajan (1994)

● Geet Sangeet (1994)

● Mejo Bou (1995) as Haasi

● Puja (1996)

● Boro Bou (1997)

● Lofar (1997)

● Sriman Bhootnath (1997)

● Santan (1999)

● Mejobabu (2009)

● Bolidaan (2010)

● Didibhai (2010)

● Kyablar Biye (2013)
