= Mayabini =

- Directed by: Tushar Majumdar
- Starring: Tapas Paul; Debashree Roy; Abhishek Chatterjee; Utpal Dutta
- Music by: Tanmoy Chattopadhyay
- Production company: Mangaldeep Pictures Private Limited.
- Release date: 1992
- Country: India
- Language: Bengali

Mayabini is a 1992 Indian Bengali-language romantic thriller film directed by Tushar Majumdar and produced under the banner of Mangaldeep Pictures Private Limited. The music director of the film was Tanmoy Chattapadhyay and playback singers included Asha Bhosle, Amit Kumar, Mohammed Aziz, Anuradha Paudwal and Kavita Krishnamurthy.

== Plot ==
Woodcutters were working in the dense jungle of Pratapgarh estate but suddenly one animal-like creature started killing them. Fearful labours went to Rajabahadur for their safety. Being the owner of the forest Rajabahadur and his trusted Nayeb (Accountant) Biswambhar Dutta filed a complaint to the police to stop the continuous mishap. Mr. Gadadhar Halder, the worthless Officer-in-charge of local police station deputed two constable in forest but could not find out the murderer. Rajabahadur informs her sister Bimala, that his friend Mainak Singha Choudhury is coming with his niece Madhabi to arrange the marriage of Madhabi with Kumar Bahadur, only son of Rajabahadur. But that very day Rajabahadur became killed by one masked person. On the other side a bar dancer in Kolkata, Ms. Swati who is exactly looking like Madhabi is in serious need of money for the operation of her mother. She tries to borrow the amount but fails. She gets an action role of Madhabi who is going to marry Kumar Bahadur. A master plan was prepared by gang leader Raghu Roy to send Swati instead of Madhabi as well as kidnap original Madhabi with his uncle. Swati and one gambler Biplab Panja come to Pratapgarh as niece and uncle. A newly appointed driver Panchu suspiciously watches on everyone. In the meantime the Deputy Superintendent of Police Ranjit Chatterjee goes to Pratapgarh to investigate the murders. Earlier there was an affair between Ranjit and Madhabi. However, after the engagement, Bimala takes Swati and Biplab Panja to an underground vault to gift her some jewellery. Immediately after the incident someone steals all the valuables. The servant who saw the real thief became murdered. In the end it revealed that the Nayeb of the estate is the original thief and murderer. Driver Panchu (a.k.a. Narayan Ghosh) who is actually the detective inspector of police arrest Biswambhar. Police confirm that Swati and Biplab are mere imposter and also alleged them but they were set free because the charge against them is denied by Kumar. At last Kumar marries Swathi and Biplob is selected as new Nayeb of Pratapgarh estate.

== Cast ==
- Debashree Roy as Swati or Madhabi
- Tapas Pal as Kumar Bahadur
- Utpal Dutta as Biplab Panja
- Haradhan Bandopadhyay as Raja Bahadur
- Biplab Chatterjee as Driver Panchu
- Nirmal Kumar as Mainak Singha Choudhury
- Meenakshi Goswami as Bimala
- Abhishek Chatterjee as DSP Ranjit Chatterjee
- Chinmoy Roy as Gadadhar Halder
- Lily Chakravarty as Swati's Mother
- Nimu Bhowmik as Raghu Roy
- Bankim Ghosh as Landlord of Swati
