= Shakuntala Barua =

Indian actress and singer in Bengali cinema

- শকুন্তলা বড়ুয়া
- Born: 22 April 1947 (age 79); Calcutta, West Bengal, India
- Occupations: Actress, singer
- Years active: 1973–present

Shakuntala Barua (born 22 April 1947) is an Indian actress and singer who has worked predominantly in Bengali cinema, along with occasional roles in Assamese and Hindi films. In a career spanning more than five decades, she has appeared in a wide range of films, from family melodramas and social dramas to parallel cinema and recent commercial successes. Known for her portrayals of strong matriarchs and emotionally intense characters, she is regarded as one of the senior-most character actresses of modern Bengali cinema.

== Early life ==
Barua was born in Calcutta (now Kolkata), West Bengal, on 22 April 1947. She was drawn to music and theatre from an early age. She trained in Rabindra Sangeet and classical music under renowned exponents Suchitra Mitra, Dilip Kumar Roy, and Krishna Chattopadhyay.

== Career ==
=== Early years ===
Her first screen appearance is variously reported. Some sources credit her with a lead role in the Assamese feature film Anutaap (1973), while others identify her Bengali breakthrough opposite Uttam Kumar in Sunayani (1979).

=== Prominence (1980s–1990s) ===
During the 1980s and 1990s, Barua became a familiar screen presence. She acted in the action drama Shatru (1984), Aparna Sen's acclaimed Paroma (1985), and Rituparno Ghosh's Dahan (1997), which won the National Film Award for Best Screenplay.

She appeared in both commercial hits and artistic ventures, balancing roles as affectionate mothers, stern guardians, and supportive figures in family-centric narratives.

=== Later and recent work ===
In the 2000s and 2010s, Barua continued working in notable projects. Her credits include Pitribhumi (2007), Sedin Dekha Hoyechilo (2010), Alik Sukh (2013), Gogoler Kirti (2014), Sahaj Paather Gappo / Colours of Innocence (2016), Ahaa Re (2019), and the popular Tonic (2021).

In a 2021 interview, she reflected on the challenges of aging as an actress but emphasized her gratitude for opportunities to work in meaningful projects.

=== Singing career ===
Alongside acting, Barua recorded several music albums. Her Rabindra Sangeet album Puja Amar Sango Holo (1994) remains available on Apple Music and Spotify.

== Personal life ==
Barua's daughter, Rajoshi (Piloo) Vidyarthi, is also active in the arts as an actor and singer.

== Awards and honours ==
- Mahanayak Samman (2017), awarded by the Government of West Bengal for lifetime contribution to cinema.
- Bulbul Mukherjee Smriti Puraskar (2016), awarded by the Overman Foundation, Kolkata.

== Filmography ==
=== Films ===
Year	Title	Role	Language	Notes	Ref(s)
1973	Anutaap		Assamese	Early appearance	
1977	Sandhya Raag		Bengali		
1979	Sunayani		Bengali	Opposite Uttam Kumar	
1981	Saheb		Bengali		
1981	Pratisodh		Bengali		
1984	Shatru	Asha	Bengali		
1985	Madhumoy		Bengali		
1985	Paroma (Parama)		Bengali	Aparna Sen film	
1987	Guru Dakshina		Bengali		
1988	Ora Chaar Jon		Bengali		
1989	Aamar Tumi		Bengali		
1989	Sati		Bengali		
1989	Asha O Bhalobasha		Bengali		
1989	Chokher Aloy		Bengali		
1989	Akrosh		Bengali		
1989	Tufan (Toofan)		Bengali		
1990	Badnam		Bengali		
1990	Apon Amaar Apon		Bengali		
1990	Debata		Bengali		
1990	Ekhane Aamar Swarga		Bengali		
1992	Hirer Angti		Bengali		
1992	Gunjan		Bengali		
1992	Monikanchan		Bengali		
1992	Pratham Dekha		Bengali		
1992	Bedenir Prem		Bengali		
1994	Tumi Je Amar	Joyeeta Haldar	Bengali		
1994	Sarbojaya		Bengali		
1994	Dhusar Godhuli		Bengali		
1997	Manasha Kanya		Bengali		
1997	Dabidar		Bengali		
1997	Dahan	Jhinuk’s mother	Bengali	National Award-winning film	
1998	Sagar Banya		Bengali		
1998	Atmiyo Swajan		Bengali		
1999	Yugavatar Lokenath		Bengali		
2001	Parinati		Bengali		
2001	Shesh Ashray		Bengali		
2001	Srimoti Bhayonkori		Bengali		
2003	Biswasghatak		Bengali		
2006	Nayak		Bengali		
2007	Pitribhumi		Bengali		
2009	Moner Ajante		Bengali		
2010	Shedin Dekha Hoyechilo		Bengali		
2010	Bejanma		Bengali		
2011	Ami Montri Hobo		Bengali		
2012	Aaro Kachha Kachhi		Bengali		
2012	Amrita		Bengali		
2012	Phire Eso Tumi		Bengali		
2013	Chaap – The Pressure		Bengali		
2013	Alik Sukh – A Tale of Fleeting Happiness		Bengali		
2014	Gogoler Kirti		Bengali		
2016	Sahaj Paather Gappo / Colours of Innocence	Lakshmi Granny	Bengali	Critically acclaimed	
2019	Ahaa Re	Debi	Bengali		
2021	Tonic	Uma Sen	Bengali	Popular commercial hit	
2025	Projapati 2		Bengali	Popular commercial hit	

=== Television ===
Years	Title	Role	Network	Ref(s)
2012–2014	Bodhu Kon Alo Laaglo Chokhe	Nonibala	Star Jalsha	
2016–2017	Raadha	Grandmother	Zee Bangla	
2018–2019	Bhoomikanya		Star Jalsha	
2019	Eka Noi Ekannoborti		Aakash Aath	
n/a	Kurukshetra		Aakash Aath	

== Discography ==
- Puja Amar Sango Holo (Album, 1994).
