= Kartabya =

Indian movie

- A poster of Kartabya
- Directed by: Swapan Saha
- Story by: Erode Soundar
- Produced by: Pijush Saha; Subrata Saha Roy
- Starring: Prosenjit Chatterjee; Rachna Banerjee; Lokesh Ghosh; Dulal Lahiri
- Music by: Ashok Bhadra
- Production company: Friends International
- Distributed by: Eskay Movies
- Release date: 26 November 2003 (India)
- Country: India
- Language: Bengali

Kartabya (Bengali: কর্তব্য [kortobe̯o]) is a 2003 Indian Bengali-language drama film directed by Swapan Saha and produced by Pijush Saha and Subrata Saha Roy. It is a remake of the 2001 Tamil-language film Samudhiram.

== Cast ==
- Prosenjit Chatterjee
- Rachna Banerjee
- Lokesh Ghosh
- Dulal Lahiri
- Locket Chatterjee
- Tapas Paul
- Abhishek Chatterjee
- Moumita Chakraborty
- Kalyani Mondal
- Badsha Maitra
- Manjushree Ganguly

== Music ==
Ashok Bhadra composed the soundtrack album to the film, which includes songs rendered by Annupamaa, Soham Chakraborty, Shreya Ghoshal, Kumar Sanu and Babul Supriyo. The lyrics were written by Gautam Susmit.

== Release ==
Kartabya was released on 26 November 2003.
