= Mangaldeep =

- Directed by: Haranath Chakraborty
- Written by: Anjan Chowdhury
- Produced by: Bhabesh Kundu
- Starring: Ranjit Mallick; Sandhya Roy; Tapas Paul; Satabdi Roy; Haradhan Banerjee; Kali Banerjee; Anup Kumar
- Music by: Bappi Lahiri
- Release date: 14 July 1989
- Country: India
- Language: Bengali

Mangaldeep is a 1989 Indian Bengali-language musical drama film directed by Haranath Chakraborty and produced by Bhabesh Kundu. The story was written by Anjan Chowdhury. The film music composition by Bappi Lahiri. The film stars Ranjit Mallick, Sandhya Roy, Tapas Paul, Satabdi Roy, Haradhan Banerjee, Kali Banerjee and Anup Kumar in pivotal roles.

== Cast ==
- Ranjit Mallick
- Sandhya Roy
- Tapas Paul
- Satabdi Roy
- Haradhan Banerjee
- Kali Banerjee
- Anup Kumar
- Bhabesh Kundu
- Soumitra Banerjee
- Nimu Bhowmick
- Prashanta Chatterjee
- Salil Dutta
- Khudiram Bhattacharya
- Arjun Bhattacharya
- Debnath Chatterjee
- Aloka Ganguly
- Soham Chakraborty

== Music ==
The music was composed by Bappi Lahiri. All lyrics written by Bhabesh Kundu.

Song	Singer
"Aami Deep Tumi Mangal"	Bappi Lahiri
"Ramayane Ramchandra"	Bappi Lahiri
"E Jeebone Peyechhi Je"	Bappi Lahiri
"Khushir Joyare Aaj"	Mohammed Aziz
"Shesh Gaan Noy Aaj"	Mohammed Aziz
"Tomra Aamay Dao Na"	Pankaj Udhas
"Pran Aaj Gaan Geye Sukh Pete Chay"	Asha Bhosle, Amit Kumar
