= Aadmi Aur Aurat =

1984 film by Tapan Sinha

- Written by: Prafulla Roy; Tapan Sinha
- Directed by: Tapan Sinha
- Starring: Amol Palekar; Mahua Roychoudhury
- Music by: Ashish Khan
- Country of origin: India
- Original language: Hindi

Production
- Producer: Doordarshan
- Cinematography: Kamal Nayak
- Editor: Subodh Roy
- Running time: 56 minutes

Original release
- Network: Doordarshan
- Release: 1984

Aadmi Aur Aurat (transl. 'Man and Woman') is 1984 Hindi language telefilm directed by Tapan Sinha. The movie was telecast on Doordarshan, the government-owned TV channel of India. It was screened in International Film Festival of India in 2007. This film was remade by Sinha in Bengali as Manush, starring Samit Bhanja and Devika Mukherjee.

== Cast ==
- Amol Palekar
- Mahua Roychoudhury
- Kalyan Chatterjee
- Nirmal Ghosh
- Parimal Sengupta
- K. Singh
- Dipak Sanyal
- Sameer Mukharjee

== Awards ==
Award	Category	Recipient(s) and nominee(s)	Result	Ref.
National Film Awards	Nargis Dutt Award for Best Feature Film on National Integration	Doordarshan and Tapan Sinha	Won	
