= Atmatyag =

- Directed by: Kumar Monojit
- Written by: Kumar Monojit
- Screenplay by: Kumar Monojit
- Produced by: A. K. Movie Makers
- Release date: 2 March 2012
- Language: Bengali

Atmatyag (transl. Sacrifice) (2012) is a Bengali drama film directed by Kumar Monojit and produced by A. K. Movie Makers.

== Cast ==
- Manoj Mitra
- Chumki Chowdhury
- Dulal Lahiri
- Satinath Mukhopadhyay
- Debika Mukhopadhyay

== See also ==
- Mon Bole Priya Priya, Bengali-language film released in 2011
