= Haradhan Banerjee =

Indian actor and freedom fighter

Haradhan Bandopadhyay
- Born: 6 November 1926; Kushtia, Nadia, Bengal Presidency, British India
- Died: 5 January 2013 (aged 86); Kolkata, West Bengal, India
- Occupation: Actor
- Years active: 1948–2013
- Children: Prasad Banerjee (Son), Kaushik Banerjee (Son)

Haradhan Bandopadhyay (6 November 1926 – 5 January 2013) was a Bengali Indian actor of television and films. He made his debut in the 1948 Bengali film Devdut, directed by Atanu Bandopadhyay. He worked with some of the most prominent directors of Bengali cinema, including Satyajit Ray and Mrinal Sen.

== Early life ==
Bandopadhyay started his schooling from Kushtia Municipal School in East Bengal, now Bangladesh. He passed matriculation in 1944. In 1946, he finished his IA exam from City College, Kolkata, an affiliate of the University of Calcutta. He worked in Gun & Shell factory. In 1946, he joined The Oriental Insurance Company Limited, and worked there until his retirement . He was also jailed for his involvement in the freedom movement of India.

== Career ==
He made his debut in director Atanu Bandopadhay's film Devdut in 1948. He was a celebrated stage artiste who acted in hundreds of plays, working with famous names like Ahindra Choudhury, Chhabi Biswas and Utpal Dutt.

== Death ==
Bandopadhyay died on 5 January 2013 at the age of 86. He had developed pneumonia and was admitted to hospital 15 days before his death. Bandopadhyay is survived by his wife and two sons. After his death, Bengali film actors Paran Bandopadhyay and Soumitra Chatterjee said that his death was a great loss for the Bengali film industry. Another Bengali director, Srijit Mukherji, stated: "I'm devastated by his death... The embodiment of affection passes away."

== Selected filmography ==
- Michael Madhusudhan (1950) as David Hare
- Barjatri (1951)
- Pandit Mashai (1951)
- Niyoti (1951)
- Mriter Marte Agaman (1959)
- Megh (1959)
- Bhagini Nivedita (1962)
- Mahanagar (1963) as Himangshu Mukherjee
- Barnali (1963) as S.P.Mukherjee - General Manager
- Momer Alo (1964) as Ananta Chatterjee
- Ghoom Bhangar Gaan (1965)
- Kapurush (1965) as Bimal Gupta
- Akash Kusum (1965) as Monica's father
- Antony Firingee (1967) as Kelly Antony
- Kheya (1967)
- Chhotto Jignasa (1968)
- Chowringhee (1968) as Jimmy
- Aparichita (1969 film) (1969)
- Deshbandhu Chittaranjan (1970)
- Seemabaddha (1971) as Talukdar
- Nishachar (1971)
- Chinna Patra (1972)
- Padi Pishir Barmi Baksha (1972)
- Sonar Khancha (1973)
- Nani Gopaler Biye (1973)
- Jadi Jantem (1974) as Government lawyer
- Devi Chaudhurani (1974)
- Sonar Kella (1974) as Tapesh's father, Felu's uncle
- Asati (1974)
- Nagar Darpane (1975)
- Chorus (1975) as Committee Member
- Raag Anurag (1975) as Mr. Dutt
- Priyo Bandhabi (1975)
- Seyi Chokh (1976)
- Hotel Snow Fox (1976)
- Nidhiram Sardar (1976)
- Sudur Niharika (1976) - Dr. Arunendu Sen
- Joi Baba Felunath (1979) - Umanath Ghoshal
- Jharh (1979)
- Dadar Kirti (1980) - Kedar's father
- Ogo Bodhu Shundori (1981) - Loola Bose's Husband
- Father (1981)
- Jawalaa Dahej Ki (1982) - Haradhan Banerjee
- Pratiksha (1982)
- Jake Ghoosh Dite Hoy (1982)
- Sansarer Itikatha (1983)
- Agamikal (1983)
- Phatik Chand (1983) - Saradindu Sanyal, Advocate / father of Phatik Chand / Bablu / Nikhil Sanyal
- Din Jai (1983)
- Aparupa (1983)
- Lal Golap (1984)
- Agni Shuddhi (1984)
- Dujane (1984)
- Pratigna (1985)
- Shyam Saheb (1986)
- Shapmukti (1986)
- Pathbhola (1986) as Radhabinode Babu
- Mangaldeep (1989)
- Pronami Tomai (1989)
- Mangal Deep (1989)
- Kari Diye Kinlam (1989)
- Amar Prem (1989)
- Aakrosh (1989) as Mili's father, Police Officer
- Shakha Proshakha (1990) as Probodh
- Papi (1990)
- Neelimay Neel (1991)
- Sadharan Meye (1991)
- Goopy Bagha Phire Elo (1991) as King of Anandapur
- Surer Bhubane (1992)
- Shet Patharer Thala (1992) as Bandana's Father-in-Law
- Mayabini (1992)
- Pratham Dekha (1992)
- Duranta Prem (1993)
- Rajar Raja (1994)
- Dhusar Godhuli (1994)
- Bhalobasar Ashroy (1994)
- Sansar Sangram (1995)
- Baksha Rahasya (1966) as Dinanath Lahiri
- Puja (1996)
- Lathi (1996)
- Boro Bou (1997) as Haradhan Bandyopadhyay
- Lal Darja (1997)
- Neoti (1999)
- Jibon Niye Khela (1999) as Dr.Sen
- Madhur Milan (2000)
- Dekha (2001) as Sarama's father
- Swapner Feriwala (2002) as Turni's grandfather
- Adorini (2003) as Boren / Dadubhai
- Parineeta (2005) as Chatterjee
- Krantikaal (2005) as Zamindar
- Anuranan (2006) as Mr. Sen 'Colonel'
- Kailashe Kelenkari (2008) as Sidhu Jyatha
- Chander Bari (2007)
- Khela (2008)
- Josh (2010) - Indra's Grandpa
- Ogo Bodhu Sundari (2010)
- Lajja -The Shame (2010)
- Gorosthaney Sabdhan (2010) as Sidhu Jyatha
- Shotru (2011) as Dadu
- 8:08 Er Bongaon Local (2012) as Doctor
- Barfi! (2012) as Daaju
- Khoka 420 (2013) as dadubhai (final film role)

== Awards ==
- Best Stage artist award by Ulto Rath Magazine [1961]
- National Film Award for Best Supporting Actor [2005]
- Banga Bibhushan by Government of West Bengal [2011]
- Kalakar Awards
