= Kapalkundala (1981 film) =

- Directed by: Pinaki Bhushan Mukherji
- Written by: Bankimchandra Chattopadhyay
- Produced by: Pinaki Bhushan Mukherji
- Music by: Hemanta Mukherjee
- Release date: 1981
- Country: India
- Language: Bengali

Kapalkundala is a 1981 Bengali drama film directed and produced by Pinaki Bhushan Mukherji. It starred Ranjit Mallick, Bhanu Bannerjee and Mahua Roy Chowdhury in lead roles. This was the fourth remake of Kapalakundala based on 1866 same name novel of Bankimchandra Chattopadhyay.

== Plot ==
Nabakumar, a young man loses his way in the forest while returning from Gangasagar. A Tantric traps him to sacrifice him before the goddess Kali. A lady, Kapalkundala rescues Nabakumar. He married Kapalkundala and returned to his village Saptagram. The Tantric plans to take revenge against both of them.

== Cast ==
- Ranjit Mallick as Nabakumar
- Mahua Roychoudhury as Kapalkundala
- Bhanu Bannerjee
- Ajitesh Bandopadhyay
- Sumitra Mukherjee
- Samita Biswas
- Ardhendu Mukherjee
