= Barood (2004 film) =

2004 Indian Bengali action thriller film by T. L. V. Prasad

- Promotional poster
- Directed by: T. L. V. Prasad
- Screenplay by: N. K. Salil
- Story by: T. L. V. Prasad
- Produced by: Pritam Jalan
- Starring: Mithun Chakraborty; Usha Shree; Rajatava Dutta; Lokesh Ghosh
- Cinematography: P. Devraj
- Edited by: Shyam Mukherjee
- Music by: Babul Bose
- Production company: Kushagra Arts
- Distributed by: Shree Venkatesh Films; Surinder Films
- Release date: 16 April 2004
- Running time: 142 minutes
- Country: India
- Language: Bengali

Barood (transl. Gunpowder) is a 2004 Indian Bengali-language action film directed by T. L. V. Prasad. Produced by Pritam Jalan under the banner of Kushagra Arts, the screenplay and dialogues of the film were written by N. K. Salil. It stars Mithun Chakraborty, Usha Sree, Lokesh Ghosh, and Rajatava Dutta in lead roles.. This is a remake of 2003 Tamil film Saamy.

== Plot ==
Honest police officer DSP Barunoday Basak is always protesting against injustice. Later, he is shown being bribed by a corrupt politician. However, the police officer's primary objective is to discredit the politician. The policeman takes many steps to destroy the politician and finally succeeds.

== Cast ==
- Mithun Chakraborty as DSP Barunoday Basak aka Barood
- Usasi Misra as Deepa, Barunoday's wife (credited as Usha Shree)
- Lokesh Ghosh as SI Gautam Banerjee
- Rajatava Dutta as Sitaram Ghoshal, a corrupt politician
- Shankar Chakraborty as Anwar Bhai
- Subhendu Chatterjee as Barunoday's father
- Rimjhim Gupta as Barunoday's younger sister
- Mrinal Mukherjee as MLA Baleshwar Jha
- Subhasish Mukherjee
- Sunil Mukherjee
- Antara Biswas - special appearance in item song Kanta Futeche
