= Jibon Niye Khela =

- Film poster
- Directed by: Anjan Choudhury
- Produced by: Sayantani International
- Starring: Ranjit Mallick; Biplab Chatterjee; Haradhan Bandopadhyay; Arjun Chakraborty; Manoj Mitra; Debashree Roy; Subhendu Chatterjee; Chumki Chowdhury
- Music by: Tapan Chakraborty
- Release date: 9 July 1999
- Country: India
- Language: Bengali

Jibon Niye Khela (English: Playing with life) is a 1999 Indian Bengali language political action drama film directed by Anjan Choudhury. The film attained mass attention as it deals with the corruption in Healthcare sector of West Bengal. The film features Ranjit Mallick, Biplab Chatterjee, Manoj Mitra, Debashree Roy, Subhendu Chatterjee, Chumki Choudhury, Haradhan Bandopadhyay, Arjun Chakraborty, Lokesh Ghosh and Rina Choudhury in lead roles, while Supriya Devi did a guest appearance. The music of the film was composed by Tapan Chakraborty, background music was scored and lyrics were penned by Leela Choudhury.

== Plot ==
The movie revolves around an imaginary village called Dharampur where Dr. Subhankar Sanyal (Ranjit Mallick) arrives as the head doctor of a Dharampur State Hospital, who is a specialist in each field. He tries to break the previous rules made in an agreement between the Super, (Manoj Mitra), and Dr. Sen, (Haradhan Bandopadhyay), because of which he faces many difficulties. By creating various hardships in his daily life, the Super and Dr. Sen try to remove him from the hospital. They succeed in this act by passing out his transfer to some other place. But they were confronted by the villagers who try to prevent him from leaving the village.

== Cast ==
- Ranjit Mallick as Dr. Shubhankar Sanyal
- Debashree Roy as Minoti Samanta
- Subhendu Chatterjee as Ex-Minister Pratap Samanta
- Supriya Devi as Shubhankar's Mother
- Haradhan Bandopadhyay as Dr. Sen
- Manoj Mitra as a corrupt official
- Biplab Chatterjee
- Arjun Chakraborty
- Lokesh Ghosh as Runu
- Chumki Chowdhury as Rekha
- Rina Choudhury as Madhuri Sanyal
- Rita Koiral
- Gita Dey
