= Nawab Nandini =

- Nawab Nandini Movie Poster
- Directed by: Haranath Chakraborty
- Screenplay by: Anjan Choudhury; Manjil Banerjee
- Story by: Anjan Choudhury
- Produced by: Jagadish Pande
- Starring: Hiran; Koel Mallick; Ranjit Mallick
- Cinematography: Anjan Choudhury
- Edited by: Swapan Guha
- Music by: Jeet Gannguli; Babul Bose
- Production company: Bengal Films 2004
- Distributed by: Eskay Movies
- Release date: 23 November 2007
- Running time: 135 minutes
- Country: India
- Language: Bengali

Nawab Nandini (Bengali: নবাব নন্দিনী) is a 2007 Romantic Bengali film directed by Haranath Chakraborty, and the story written by Anjan Choudhury. The film stars Hiran, Koel Mallick, Ranjit Mallick, and Sandhya Roy. This movie was Hiran's debut.

== Cast ==
- Hiran Chatterjee as Nabab
- Koel Mallick as Nandini, his beloved
- Ranjit Mallick as Rajat Bannerjee, his uncle, supposedly
- Sandhya Roy
- Tathoi Deb
- Anuradha Ray
- Ashok Kumar-II
- Sumanta Mukherjee
- Ramen Raychowdhury
- Sachin Mullik
- Sagnik Chatterjee

== Soundtrack ==
Nabab Nandini

Soundtrack album by Jeet Gannguli
- Released: 2007
- Recorded: 2006
- Genre: Film soundtrack
- Label: V Music
- Producer: Bengal Films 2004

Jeet Gannguli chronology
Kranti (2006)	Nabab Nandini (2007)	Minister Fatakeshto (2007)

All lyrics are written by Gautam Sushmit; all music is composed by Jeet Gannguli.

Soundtrack
No.	Title	Singer(s)	Length
1.	"Aaj Mon Harate"	Shaan, Alka Yagnik	4:18
2.	"Aami Aachi Sneha Mamata"	Amit Kumar	2:59
3.	"Chupi Chupi Churi Kore"	Shaan, Alka Yagnik	4:03
4.	"O Roop Aamar Avilasha"	Shaan, June Banerjee	4:27
5.	"Kemon Aacho Bolo"	Shaan, Alka Yagnik	4:48
Total length:			20:37

== Awards ==
- Anandalok Best Action Hero Award 2008-Hiran Chatterjee
