= Mahua Roy Choudhury =

Indian actress

- মহুয়া রায় চৌধুরী
- Roy Choudhury in Dadar Kirti (1980)
- Born: 24 September 1956
- Died: 22 July 1985 (aged 28); Calcutta, West Bengal
- Occupation: Actress
- Years active: 1969–1985
- Known for: Shriman Prithviraj; Dadar Kirti; Aaj Kal Parshur Galpo; Aadmi Aur Aurat; Rajpurush
- Children: 1

Mahua Roy Choudhury (Bengali: মহুয়া রায় চৌধুরী; 24 September 1956 – 22 July 1985) was an Indian actress recognized for her work in Bengali cinema. She is considered to be one of the most successful actresses of Bengali Cinema. She received several awards including a Filmfare Award. She was posthumously conferred with the Best Actress Award for her role in Aadmi Aur Aurat (1984) at the 5th Damascus International Film Festival in 1987.

== Personal life ==
Roy Choudhury was born on 24 September 1956. Her original name was Shipra Roy Choudhury. Director Tarun Majumdar named her ‘Mahua’. Tarun Majumdar discovered her and Sandhya Roy groomed her. Mahua Roy Choudhury was from a lower middle class family of Dum Dum. Her father Nilanjan Roy Choudhury was a dancer.

So from her childhood she had the knack of dancing. She could not pursue her studies due to the economic instability of her family. Meanwhile, she made her acting debut in Tarun Majumdar's Shriman Prithviraj (1973). She shared screen with matinee idol Uttam Kumar in some films, notable being Sei Chokh, Bagh Bondi Khela, etc. She had hit films pairing with actors like Deepankar De, Santu Mukhopadhyay, Samit Bhanja, Anup Kumar, Tapas Paul, Chiranjeet, Kaushik Banerjee, Ranjit Mallick and Prosenjit Chatterjee. Her next-door girl image made her popular in Bengali households. Actresses Sabitri Chatterjee, Sandhya Roy groomed her acting skills. Very few actresses of her time knew classical as well as modern dance so well. Mahua infused dancing successfully in her films, a quality quite rare in those days.

She married actor Tilak Chakraborty on 2 May 1976. They had one son named Tamal.

Her performance in Tapan Sinha's Aadmi Aur Aurat with Amol Palekar won her critical acclaim that elevated her reputation from merely filling up the box office coffers. There was even a time when Bengali films used to run by her name only. Within a very short span of time Mahua had met with huge success and popularity. She almost by herself had put the Bengali cinema on a comeback trail with Lal Golap in 1983.

== Death ==
Around midnight on 12 July 1985, Mahua, in a complete drunk state had a fire accident at her residence, receiving serious burns. After nearly ten days of hospitalisation, she died on 22 July 1985. She was 28. The exact cause of the fire remains a mystery. Many believed that she committed suicide, while some considered it accident. If the former is true then it would be her third suicide attempt.

She had around 15 films running on her shoulder at the time of her death. Many of her films were released after her death like Anurager Choya, Prem O Paap, Abhimaan, Ashirbaad, Kenaram Becharam, Abir, etc. The whole industry grieved on her sudden demise. Police was unable to find out the exact cause of her death.

== Awards ==
| Award | Year | Category | Film | Result |
|---|---|---|---|---|
| Filmfare Awards East | 1980 | Best Actress | Dadar Kirti | Won |
| Damascus International Film Festival Award | 1987 | Best Actress | Aadmi Aur Aurat | Won |

== Filmography ==
This list is incomplete; you can help by expanding it.

- Sriman Prithviraj (1973) - Amala Bala (Roy) Mukherjee
- Je Jekhane Dariye (1974)
- Raja (1974)
- Bagh Bondi Khela (1975, revised in 1989) - Dolon Bose
- Sei Chokh (1976)
- Dampati (1976)
- Anandamela (1976)
- Jiban Morur Prante (1976)
- Asamay (1976)
- Ajashra Dhanyabad (1976)
- Chhotto Nayak (1977)
- Kabita (1977)
- Behula Lokhindar (1977)
- Seshraksha (1977)
- Babumoshai (1977)
- Pratishruti (1977)
- Ranger Saheb (1978)
- Parichay (1978)
- Ghatkali (1979)
- Dub De Mon Kali Bole (1979)
- Daksha Joggo (1979)
- Dour (1979)
- Mother (1979)
- Bono Basar (1979)
- Ei to Sangsar (1979)
- Satma (1979)
- Paka Dekha (1980) - Aparna
- Priyatama (1980)
- Subarnalata (1980)
- Kalo Chokher Tara (1980)
- Sei Sur (1980)
- Sesh Bichar (1980)
- Parabesh (1980)
- Dadar Kirti (1980)
- Upalabdhi (1981)
- Subarna Golak (1981)
- Pratishodh (1981)
- Kalankini (1981)
- Surya Sakshi (1981)
- Saheb (1981) - Bulti
- Kapalkundala (1981)
- Father (1981)
- Bodhon (1982)
- Sati Sabitri Satyaban (1982)
- Aaj Kal Porshur Galpo (1982)
- Subha Rajani (1982)
- Iman Kalyan (1982) - Mallika
- Sonar Bangla (1982)
- Amrita Kumbher Sandhane (1982)
- Matir Swargo (1982)
- Shathe Shathyang (1982)
- Faisala (1982)
- Utsarga (1983)
- Suparna (1983)
- Jabanbondi (1983)
- Din Jai (1983)
- Rajeshwari (1984)
- Prayaschitta (1984)
- Lal Golap (1984)
- Parabat Priya (1984)
- Shatru (1984)
- Jog Biyog (1985)
- Aadmi Aur Aurat (1985, TV Movie)
- Aloy Phera (1985)
- Amar Prithibi (1985)
- Neel Kantha (1985)
- Paroma (1985)
- Sandhya Pradip (1985)
- Till Theke Tal (1985)
- Anurager Chowa (1986)
- Kenaram Becharam (1986)
- Prem O Paap (1986)
- Abhimaan (1986)
- Dadu Nati o Hati (1986)
- Jeeban (1986)
- Ashirbad (1986)
- Shapmukti (1986)
- Madhumoy (1986)
- Raj Purush (1987)
- Lalan Fakir (1987)
- Abir (1987)
- Jawab (1987)
- Jagoron (1990)
- Sankranti (1990)
- Rangbaaz (1993)
- Jekhane Ashroy (2009) - (final film role)
