= Guru Dakshina (1987 film) =

1987 Bengali musical romantic film by Anjan Choudhury

- Directed by: Anjan Choudhury
- Produced by: Bhabesh Kundu
- Starring: Ranjit Mallick; Tapas Paul; Satabdi Roy; Kali Banerjee; Shakuntala Barua; Bhabesh Kundu
- Music by: Bappi Lahiri
- Release date: 8 November 1987
- Country: India
- Language: Bengali

Guru Dakshina is a 1987 Indian Bengali language musical romantic drama film written and directed by Anjan Choudhury and produced by Bhabesh Kundu. The film stars Ranjit Mallick, Tapas Paul, Satabdi Roy, Kali Banerjee, and Shakuntala Barua in the lead roles. The film is about a poor village boy named Jayanta Bose who becomes a popular singer but faces roadblocks and tragedies on the way.

== Plot ==
Jayanta Bose, a poor naïve village boy, gets a low paying job at the rich but corrupt businessman, Mr. Roy's company to support him and his mother. One day, he sings at Mr. Roy's function displaying his singing skills. This makes him an overnight star. He falls in love with Mr. Roy's daughter Rupa who's very supportive of his singing. His other boss and brotherly figure, Rajat supports them. However, Mr. Roy is unhappy with these developments as he wants Rupa to marry another man named Shekhar. He blackmails Jayanta's music teacher, his 'guru', when he is desperate to get money for his only grandson's treatment. He promises to give him the money but in return the teacher has to make Jayanta stop singing. Jayanta's guru agrees to this finding no other way to save his grandson. Jayanta promises not to sing and to also never disclose this dilemma to anyone else. This destroys his budding music career. He is also insulted by his guru's daughter-in-law when he refuses to sing for her and others at their house. His guru eventually passes away and people blame Jayanta for it as they believe his refusal to sing led to his guru's death. Jayanta falls into despair over everything but cannot reveal the reason behind any of this as he had given his word to his late guru. Shekhar tries to frame Jayanta as a thief. His plan is foiled by Rajat. Mr. Roy finally realizes how dishonest Shekhar is and what a good person Jayanta is. He finally reveals how he had blackmailed the late music teacher into stopping Jayanta from singing. Relived of his bonds, Jayanta finally sings at Rupa's birthday with a song which is a tribute to his late guru. Everyone including the late music teacher's family forgives him and Mr. Roy agrees to get him and Rupa married.

== Cast ==
- Ranjit Mallick as Rajat Roy
- Tapas Paul as Jayanta Bose
- Satabdi Roy as Rupa Roy
- Kali Banerjee as Jayanta's music teacher
- Shakuntala Barua as Jayanta's music teacher's widowed daughter-in-law
- Bhabesh Kundu as Mr. Roy
- Soumitra Bannerjee as Shekhar
- Nimu Bhowmik
- Ishani Bannerjee

== Music ==
The music of this film has been composed by Bappi Lahiri.

Song	Singer
"E Amar Gurudakshina"	Kishore Kumar
"Kotha Achho Gurudev"	Kishore Kumar
"Tomra Jatoi Aaghat Koro"	Kishore Kumar
"Aakasher Chand Matir Bukute"	Asha Bhosle
"Phool Keno Laal Hoy"	Asha Bhosle
"Prithibi Hariye Galo"	Mohammed Aziz
"Shono Shono"	Bappi Lahiri
"Aaji E Probhate"	Bhupinder Singh, Chandrani Mukherjee, Abhijeet
