= Sangharsha (1995 film) =

1995 Bengali political action film by Haranath Chakraborty

- Directed by: Haranath Chakraborty
- Screenplay by: Anjan Chowdhury
- Dialogues by: Anjan Chowdhury
- Story by: Anjan Chowdhury
- Produced by: Prabir Kumar Rakshit; Gautam Sinha Roy
- Starring: Ranjit Mallick; Tapas Paul; Prosenjit Chatterjee
- Narrated by: Anjan Chowdhury
- Cinematography: Kamal Nayak
- Edited by: Swapan Guha
- Music by: Bappi Lahiri
- Production company: Laxmi Chitram
- Distributed by: Laxmi Chitram
- Release date: 6 January 1995
- Country: India
- Language: Bengali

Sangharsha (transl. Collision) is a 1995 Indian Bengali-language political action film directed by Haranath Chakraborty. Produced by Prabir Kumar Rakshit and Gautam Sinha Roy under the banner of Laxmi Chitram, the film's story was written by Anjan Chowdhury, which itself was inspired from the political violence taken place in West Bengal during the late 1980s. The film stars an ensemble cast consisting of Ranjit Mallick, Tapas Paul, Prosenjit Chatterjee, Abhishek Chatterjee, Chumki Chowdhury, Laboni Sarkar, Manoj Mitra, and Dilip Roy in pivotal roles. Plotted in a village near Bolpur, which is ruled by two gangs, in conflict with each other for various social issues including a cold competition during the Durga Puja. During these violent situations, there arrives a doctor, Subhankar, discovers that both the leaders of the gangs are educated but are indulged to do anti-social activities forcibly by a local politician and a doctor. Then he takes the situation under control and becomes the inspiration for the gang members to be turned around.

== Plot ==
A village near Bolpur, divided into two territories - Uttarpara and Dakshinpara, are ruled by two power-seeking personalities: a Doctor Ashim Samanta and an MLA Deepak Dutta respectively. Both characters turn out to be corrupt in their own ways and employ a group of hooligans who do their dirty work. The leader of MLA's group is Bhombol and the head of the Doctor's group is Rana. Rana is the son of a school teacher, still unemployed, which leads him to seek Ashim for a job. Thereafter, Ashim begins exploiting him, involving him in anti-social activities. Similarly, MLA Deepak utilizes Bhombol for the sake of his power and position.

Shubhankar Chowdhury, a hard-working and honest doctor, comes to the village with his sister Roma and he soon combats local corruption. He fights with Bhombol and his companion to save a pregnant woman and her child, eventually taking the lady, along with her father, in his car to seek help. Bhombol and his group plan to kidnap Shubhankar's sister as revenge for Shubhankar refusing to pay their extortion money. Bhombol has a change of heart though when Shubhankar offers to operate on his mother's heart without a fee. While collecting protection money, Rana tortures a tailor to make her give Rs. 500/- to him. Roma hears about this and reports the incident to the police, but the police officer refuses to act. It turns out that Dr. Ashim pays him bribes. Rana is instructed to cut Roma's hair in public as an act of revenge and does so.

Shubhankar recognises Rana's father as their childhood teacher and gives him basic treatment for some wounds. When news of Shubhankar's treatment is related to Rana, he feels ashamed for cutting Roma's hair and asks for forgiveness from Shubhankar and Roma. Dr. Ashim makes plans to kill Bhombol's mother and then to accuse Shubhankar of the crime, but the fact that Deepak is the culprit and Bhombol is the victim gets proved in the court with the help of a few photographs.

Deepak's son Rohit and Ashim's daughter Soma are in love with each other and denounce their father's corruption. Ashim makes a confession in court regarding the conspiracy he made with MLA to kill Bhombol's mother. Deepak and Ashim are imprisoned for five years.

== Cast ==
- Ranjit Mallick as Dr. Subhankar Chowdhury
- Tapas Paul as Rana
- Prosenjit Chatterjee as Bhombol
- Abhishek Chatterjee as Rohit Dutta
- Chumki Chowdhury as Soma Samanta
- Laboni Sarkar as Roma Chowdhury
- Manoj Mitra as MLA Deepak Dutta
- Dilip Roy as Dr. Ashim Samanta
- Ruma Guha Thakurta as Rana's Mother
- Satya Bandyopadhyay as Rana's Father
- Anup Kumar
- Tarun Kumar
- Dulal Lahiri as Police Inspector
- Somasree Chaki

== Soundtrack ==
All lyrics are penned by Anjan Chowdhury, Pulak Bandyopadhyay and Bhabesh Kundu.

Song	Singer
"Ki Moja"	Asha Bhosle
"Ki Moja" (Sad)	Asha Bhosle
"Prem Korechhi"	Asha Bhosle, Bappi Lahiri
"Dudher Bachha"	Amit Kumar, Bappi Lahiri
"Tol Re Tol"	Amit Kumar
"Uttarpara Dakshinpara"	Mohammed Aziz, Kumar Sanu, Kavita Krishnamurthy
"Kochi Kochi"	Kumar Sanu, Alka Yagnik
"Luchi Luchi"	Ila Arun
