= Chumki Chowdhury =

Indian actress

- Born: Behala, Kolkata, India
- Occupation: Actress
- Years active: 1990–present
- Spouse(s): Lokesh Ghosh (Divorced); Sajal Bhattacharjee (2007 - 2021)
- Parent(s): Anjan Choudhury (father); Joysree Choudhury (mother)
- Relatives: Rina Choudhury (sister); Sandip Chowdhury (brother) (died 2023)

Chumki Choudhury is an Indian actress who is known for her work in Bengali cinema. Chowdhury made her silver screen debut with Hirak Jayanti (1990), a Bengali film directed by Anjan Choudhury. She rose to fame because of the massive success of the film.

Furthermore, she has acted in multiple Bengali films such as Abhagini (1991), Indrajit (1992), Maya Mamata (1993), Geet Sangeet (1994), Mejo Bou (1995) and Naach Nagini Naach Re (1996), which earned her further recognition and popularity.

== Family and career ==
Chumki Choudhury was born in Kolkata. She is the daughter of famous director Anjan Choudhury and Smt. Joysree Choudhury. She passed her Madhyamik from Joysree Siksha Niketan and completed her Higher Secondary and B.A. from New Alipore College.

Chumki Choudhury made her acting debut under the direction of her father called Hirak Jayanti as a lead actress. The film was released in 1990. After doing several films, she earned her reputation in the Bengali film industry. In 1991, the people started knowing her after acting in Babloo Samaddar's film called ‘Abhagini’.

Chumki Chaudhury took her primary lessons in dance and music from her mother Joysree Choudhury and later on from Bani Debnath. She was involved with stage shows professionally.

== Filmography ==
=== Film ===
Year	Title	Role	Note	Ref
1984	Shatru	Madhu's Friend		
1990	Heerak Jayanti	Jaya		
1990	Mahajan	Jhoba		
1991	Abhagini			
1992	Indrajit			
1993	Maya Mamata			
1994	Geet Sangeet			
1994	Abbajan			
1995	Sangharsha	Soma Samantha		
1995	Mejo Bou	Shampa		
1996	Naach Nagini Naach Re			
1996	Mukhyamantri			
1996	Mahan			
1997	Sriman Bhutnath			
1997	Loafer			
1997	Boro Bou			
1998	Asal Nakal			
1999	Santan			
1999	Niyoti			
1999	Jiban Niye Khela	Rekha		
2001	Rakhi Purnima	Rakhi & Purnima	Dual role	
2002	Nishana			
2002	Chandramollika			
2002	Bangali Babu			
2003	Sejo Bou			
2006	Mahasangram			
2008	Shibaji			
2012	Atmatyag			
2013	Sneher Badhan			
2022	Kulpi			

=== TV series ===
Year	Title	Role	Network	Note	Ref
2017– 2018	Rangiye Diye Jao	Shiuli's mother	Zee Bangla	Side Role	
2017-2018	Pratidaan	Kalyani	Star Jalsha	Side Role	
2018–2019	Bajlo Tomar Alor Benu		Star Jalsha	Side Role	
2021-2022	Gangaram	Tayra's Grandmother	Star Jalsha	Side Role	
2022–2023	Aalta Phoring	Arjun's Mother	Star Jalsha	Side Role	
2023–2024	Dwitiyo Basanta	Jagriti's mother in law	Sun Bangla	Side Role	
2024–2025	Roshnai	Arannyak's aunt	Star Jalsha	Side Role	
