= Ogo Bodhu Shundori =

- Theatrical poster of Ogo Bodhu Shundori
- Directed by: Salil Dutta
- Adapted from: Pygmalion (British Play) by George Bernard Shaw; My Fair Lady (British Film) by George Cukor
- Screenplay by: Bibhuti Mukherjee
- Dialogues by: Bibhuti Mukherjee
- Story by: Kamal Bansal
- Produced by: Kamal Bansal
- Starring: Uttam Kumar; Ranjit Mallick; Moushumi Chatterjee; Sumitra Mukherjee; Santosh Dutta; Bikash Roy
- Cinematography: Bijoy Ghosh
- Edited by: Baidyanath Chatterjee
- Music by: Bappi Lahiri
- Production companies: R. D. B. & Co.
- Distributed by: R. D. B. & Co
- Release date: 6 February 1981
- Running time: 132 minutes
- Country: India
- Language: Bengali

Ogo Bodhu Shundori (Bengali pronunciation: [ˈoɡo ˈbɔd̪ʱu ʃunˈd̪ɔri] transl. Hey Beautiful Bride) is a 1981 Bengali-language masala film directed by Salil Dutta. Produced and conceptualized by Kamal Bansal under the banner of R. D. B. & Co., the title of the film is taken from a Rabindra Sangeet of the same name. It stars Uttam Kumar, Ranjit Mallick, Moushumi Chatterjee and Sumitra Mukherjee in lead roles, with a supporting cast including Santosh Dutta, Bikash Roy, Haradhan Banerjee and Chinmoy Roy. It depicts Gagan, a phonetics professor who casually wagers his socialistic wife of teaching a poor monkey-showwoman to speak Bengali and English and also making her cultured with the society.

Written by Bibhuti Mukherjee, the film is an adaptation of George Bernard Shaw's play Pygmalion (1913) and George Cukor's American film My Fair Lady (1964). It marks the seventh collaboration between Dutta and Kumar. Music of the film is composed by Bappi Lahiri, with lyrics penned by Mukherjee. The cinematography of the film is handled by Bijoy Ghosh, while Baidyanath Chatterjee edited the film. It was predominantly shot in Kolkata and Mumbai, and is also known for showing the Kolkata Book Fair in a sequence.

In July 1980, when the filming was in the process, Kumar died suffering from heart attack and his lookalike Prabir Kumar was brought in to stand in for him for the final sections of the film and for the song "O Daddy, O Mummy". Because of the incompletion of dubbing his portions, Kumar's voice from the original footages was kept intact in the film, and his brother Tarun Kumar dubbed for him due to mechanical glitches in some scenes.

Ogo Bodhu Shundori theatrically released on 6 February 1981, after the languishment in production hell for seven months. It opened to highly positive response both critically and commercially. The soundtrack album of the film sold 8 million copies in West Bengal, also generally gaining a cult status among the audiences. It emerged as the highest-grossing Bengali film of 1981, running for over 26 weeks in theatres. The Times of India included the film in their list of "Bengali cinema's greatest comedy films".

== Plot ==
In Kolkata, Professor Gagan Sen, a scholar of phonetics, gets honoured by the Indian Languages Council for his phonetic research on the Bengali language, accompanied by his assistant Abalakanta Dutta. He believes that a person's accent determines their prospects in society. Despite not liking to socialise, Gagan's wife Chitra, always loves attending parties and functions. She always fails to interpret Gagan, and claims him to be "Old-school", because of his time in reading various books and researching the literature. As a result, detractors in society mock her, saying that she has completely failed to subdue Gagan.

While visiting the Kolkata Book Fair one evening, Gagan observes Sabitri, a monkey-showwoman with a unique tribal accent, and notes the words down. He observes her trying to buy books and understands that she is keen to learn the language. Though he approaches her to get tutored, she doesn't believe Gagan and turns him down. On the other hand, her uncle, with whom she lives, allows a lustful drunkard to enter Sabitri's room. This leads her to come out of her room. Feeling disoriented, she roams here and there and all of a sudden notices Abalakanta. She identifies Gagan's residence by following Abalakanta to seek lessons the following morning.

Gagan agrees and describes how women ruin lives ("I'm an Ordinary Man"). He boasts he could teach even someone like Sabitri to speak so well that he could pass her off as a duchess at an embassy ball.

Escaping from there, she takes shelter in Gagan's house. When Gagan's wife sees Sabitri in their reading room, she leaves for her grandfather's house.

Gagan and Abalakanta help Sabitri learn etiquette and the ways of genteel society. Gagan plans an alliance between Sabitri and Abalakanta. But Sabitri does not agree. Gagan finds out that Sandeep loves Sabitri and arranges for their wedding. Chitra's servant tells her that Gagan is marrying Savitri. Chitra is back home along with her grandfather and realises that the bridegroom is Sandeep, who happens to be her brother. The film thus ends on a happy note.

== Cast ==
- Uttam Kumar as Prof. Gagan Sen
- Ranjit Mallick as Sandeep
- Moushumi Chatterjee as Sabitri, a monkey-showwoman and Sandeep's wife
- Sumitra Mukherjee as Chitra, Gagan's wife
- Santosh Dutta as Abalakanta Dutta, Gagan's assistant
- Bikash Roy as Sandeep and Chitra's grandfather
- Meenakshi Goswami as Lola Bose
- Haradhan Bandopadhyay as Standard Sebastian
- Chinmoy Roy
- Premangshu Bose as Sabitri's uncle

== Production ==
The film was based on the 1913 English play Pygmalion of George Bernard Shaw which is it'self based on the super hit British musical comedy film called My Fair Lady. The legendary actor and the matinee idol of Bengal Mahanayak Uttam Kumar died during the production.

Director Salil Dutta remembering the last two days of Uttam Kumar shooting. In the day July 22 There was a shot after lunch break. Suddenly Uttam closed his eyes with his hand on his forehead. All eyes were on Uttam. Blood was seen coming from the forehead. Director Salil Dutta quickly went ahead and seated Uttam. That scene was scene of throwing a Jaipuri ashtray. A piece of it stuck on the door and hit him on the forehead. Director quickly packed up and called the doctor, who was. a private doctor of Uttam. The doctor came in time, checked him and said that it was nothing and left some medicine. Then director wanted to stop the shoot for that day but Uttam protested against stopping the shooting. Uttam said During a work, such small and big incidents will happen. Then Uttam starts the shooting again.

On 23 July, while going for the shooting, Uttam noticed that his favorite tap recorder was not in the car. Everyday in his free time, he used to listen to songs and recorded speeches by that tape recorder. It couldn't be found even after searching every place. This incident hurt him a lot. He came to the shooting spot with a lot of sadness. The last scene of the film which he shot that day was as follows- Sumitra Mukherjee, who played the role of his wife, was going to his father house in anger and Uttam was repeatedly trying to stop his wife by shaving his beard and saying his last dialogue, Amio Dekhe Nebo Amar Naam Gogon Sen. At that time he was having a heart at his hand going between his chest while speaking the dialogue.

== Soundtrack ==
Ogo Badhu Sundari

Soundtrack album by Bappi Lahiri
- Released: 1981
- Recorded: 1980
- Studios: Bansal & Company
- Genre: Feature Film Soundtrack
- Length: 0:33:25
- Label: SA RE GA MA
- Producer: Kamal Bansal

Bappi Lahiri chronology
Sahhas (1981)	Ogo Badhu Sundari (1981)	Wardat (1981)

All lyrics are written by Bibhuti Mukherjee; all music is composed by Bappi Lahiri.

Songs
No.	Title	Playback	Length
1.	"Ei To Jiban"	Kishore Kumar	4:23
2.	"Shikhte Tomay Hobei"	Kishore Kumar	5:00
3.	"Ami Ekjon Shanto Shishto"	Kishore Kumar	3:18
4.	"Nari Charitra"	Kishore Kumar	2:34
5.	"O Daddy O Mummy"	Preeti Sagar, Chandrani Mukherjee, Poornima	5:30
6.	"Ei Duk Duk"	Asha Bhosle	3:32
7.	"Malabika Anamika"	Bappi Lahiri	5:31
8.	"Tui Joto Phool"	Asha Bhosle	3:37
Total length:			33:25

== Release & reception ==
The film was made in 1980 but released in next year 1981 February. There was a huge craze for the film because this was Bengal's favorite matinee idol Uttam Kumar's one of the last films, who died during filming on 24 July 1980. There was not much promotion for the film but still there was huge hype.

The film received overwhelming response from the critics and it is regarded as one of the best comedy Bengali films. The Times Of India kept this in their Bengali Cinema's all time greatest comedy films list.

The film was also remembered for its song and Uttam Kumar- Kishore Kumar combination. This was only the second Bengali film and only Uttam Kumar film where Bappi Lahiri composed the music. The album became huge hit and is still popular today.

When the film was released, there was huge craze in theaters for the tickets and police charged lathi. The Bengali audience filled up all the theaters to see their idol's one of the last works on screen. The film generally became blockbuster hit and is often regarded as one of the major hits in the history of Bengali Cinema. and ran for 26 weeks constantly in theaters. The film also became one of the highest grossers in that year.

== Tribute ==
In 2010 a Bengali film was made in a same title directed by Sunanda Mitra. The film starring Shreelekha Mitra, Sabitri Chatterjee, Babul Supriyo, Monami Ghosh and Kharaj Mukherjee. This is not a remake film of original. It's a tribute to Uttam Kumar and original Ogo Badhu Sundari film. In this film Babul played same name of Uttam Kumar as Uttam Kumar Chatterjee who is a die hard Uttam Kumar fan. There is also three song used in the movie from Uttam Kumar's film.
