= Tapas Paul =

Indian actor and politician (1958–2020)

- Paul in his youth
- Born: 29 September 1958; Chandannagar, West Bengal, India
- Died: 18 February 2020 (aged 61); Mumbai, Maharashtra, India
- Education: Burdwan University (B.Sc.)
- Occupations: Actor, politician
- Years active: 1980–2013
- Works: Full list
- Political party: Trinamool Congress
- Spouse: Nandini Paul (m. 1985)
- Children: Sohini Paul
- Awards: Filmfare Award

Member of Parliament, Lok Sabha
- In office 16 May 2009 – 23 May 2019
- Preceded by: Jyotirmoyee Sikdar
- Succeeded by: Mahua Moitra
- Constituency: Krishnanagar

Member of West Bengal Legislative Assembly
- In office 13 May 2001 – 16 May 2009
- Preceded by: Saugata Roy
- Succeeded by: Firhad Hakim
- Constituency: Alipore

Tapas Paul (29 September 1958 – 18 February 2020) was an Indian actor and politician. One of the most celebrated actors of Bengali cinema, Paul is best known for his on-screen roles opposite Mahua Roy Choudhury and Debashree Roy. He received a Filmfare Award.

Tapas Paul was a Member of Parliament from Krishnanagar having won in the 2014 Indian General Elections on a Trinamool Congress ticket.

Paul shot to fame and popularity with his debut film Dadar Kirti (1980), a romantic drama by Tarun Majumdar, and sustained his fame with films like Saheb (1981), Parabat Priya (1984), Bhalobasa Bhalobasa (1985), Anurager Choyan (1980), Amar Bandhan (1986), Guru Dakshina (1987) to name few. He was awarded the Filmfare Award for his role in Saheb (1981).

He made his Bollywood debut in Hiren Nag's Abodh (1984) opposite Madhuri Dixit. He collaborated with Tarun Majumdar for the second time in his romantic flick Bhalobasa Bhalobasa (1985) where he was paired with Debashree Roy. The film achieved a success and established his pairing with Roy as the most bankable one of the nineteen eighties. His other major hits with Roy include Arpan (1987), Surer Sathi (1988), Surer Akashe (1988), Nayanmani (1989), Chokher Aloy (1989), Shubha Kamana (1991), Mayabini (1992), Tobu Mone Rekho (1994), Tumi Je Aamar (1994). He collaborated with Buddhadeb Dasgupta in Uttara (2000) and Mondo Meyer Upakhyan (2002). He was arrested by C.B.I for alleged links to the Rose Valley chit fund scam in December 2016, and was given bail after 13 months.

== Education ==
Tapas Paul graduated with a bio science degree from Hooghly Mohsin College under University of Burdwan.

== Film career ==
Paul's first movie appearance was in 1980, in the film Dadar Kirti, directed by Tarun Majumder. He was seated in a train compartment, when he caught attention of Shrinibas Chakraborty, the assistant director of Dadar Kirti (1980). He was then taken to Tarun Majumdar who was at that time looking for a new face for the role Kedar. The film became a huge success at box office. For his role as a naive Kedar, Paul received immense love and appreciation from his audience. Paul collaborated with Tarun Majumdar for the second time in his romantic flick Bhalobasa Bhalobasa (1985) where he was paired with Debashree Roy. The film achieved a roaring success and established his pairing with Roy as the most bankable one of the 1980s. His other major hits with Roy include Arpan (1987), Surer Sathi (1988), Surer Akashe (1988), Nayanmani (1989), Chokher Aloy (1989), Shubha Kamana (1991), Mayabini (1992), Tobu Mone Rekho (1994). He collaborated with Buddhadeb Dasgupta in Uttara (2000) and Mondo Meyer Upakhyan (2002).

== Controversy ==
In 2014, Paul issued a public apology after threatening to "let loose [his] boys" to rape members of the opposing CPI(M).

On 31 December 2016, Paul was arrested for his involvement in the Ponzi firm Rose Valley Group. He was released after serving a thirteen months sentence.

On 11 January 2017, Bharatiya Janata Party MP Babul Supriyo filed a complaint against Paul, TMC MP Saugata Roy and MLA Mahua Moitra, for falsely accusing him of involvement in the Rose Valley scam.

== Political career ==
He was a member of Trinamool Congress and served as an MLA from Alipore for two terms (2001–2006 & 2006–2009). He was the MP of Krishnanagar from 2009 to 2018.

== Personal life ==
He was married to Nandini Paul. She was a participant of Bigg Boss Bangla of season 2. Their daughter, Sohini, is a Tollywood actress.

== Death ==
He died on 18 February 2020, aged 61. He had suffered from heart disease which led to a sudden cardiac arrest.

== Awards ==
- Kalakar Award Best Actor for Rupban in 1993
- Kalakar Award Best Actor for Mejo Bou in 1996
- Kalakar Award Best Actor for Mama Bhagne in 2001
- Kalakar Award Best Actor [Television] for Nayak in 2003
- Kalakar Award Best Actor for Pratishodh in 2005
- Filmfare Awards East Best Actor for Saheb in 1981
- Bharat Nirman Awards in 2012
