= Anjan Choudhury =

Indian film director

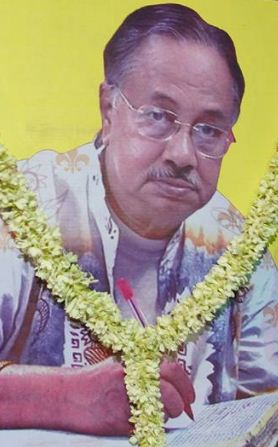
- Born: 25 November 1944; Calcutta, Bengal Presidency, India
- Died: 21 February 2007 (aged 62); Kolkata, West Bengal, India
- Occupations: Film director, screenplay writer
- Spouse: Jaysree Choudhury

Anjan Choudhury (25 November 1944 – 21 February 2007) was an Indian film director, writer and screenplay writer who worked in the Bengali cinema of West Bengal. He had two daughters and one son. Both his daughters, Chumki Chowdhury (elder) and Rina Choudhury, became actresses. His son Sandip Choudhury was a TV serial and film director. He died on 3 January 2023. His elder son-in-law is named Sajal. His daughter-in-law Bidisha Choudhury is also a film actress. He made evergreen movies like Shatru, Jibon Niye Khela and Choto Bou.

== Film career ==
He started his journey as a journalist and Writer for his Film magazine.

== Filmography ==
=== As director ===
Year	Films	Director	Story	Screenplay	Dialogues
1984	Shatru	Yes	Yes	Yes	Yes
1987	Bidrohi	Yes	Yes	Yes	Yes
1987	Guru Dakshina	Yes	Yes	Yes	Yes
1988	Chhoto Bou	Yes	Yes	Yes	Yes
1988	Anjali	Yes	Yes	Yes	Yes
1990	Hirak Jayanti	Yes	Yes	Yes	Yes
1990	Mahajan	Yes	Yes	Yes	Yes
1991	Bidhilipi	Yes	Yes	Yes	Yes
1992	Indrajit	Yes	Yes	Yes	Yes
1993	Maya Mamata	Yes	Yes	Yes	Yes
1994	Abbajan	Yes	Yes	Yes	Yes
1996	Naach Nagini Naach Re	Yes	Yes	Yes	Yes
1996	Mukhyamantri	Yes	Yes	Yes	Yes
1999	Santan	Yes	Yes	Yes	Yes
1999	Gunda	Yes	Yes	Yes	Yes
1999	Jibon Niye Khela	Yes	Yes	Yes	Yes
2002	Bangali Babu	Yes	Yes	Yes	Yes
2002	Chandra Mallika	Yes	Yes	Yes	Yes
2003	Sejo Bou	Yes	Yes	Yes	Yes
2007	Deshdrohi (shelved)	Yes	Yes	Yes	Yes

=== As writer ===
Year	Films	Story	Screenplay	Dialogues	Notes
1977	Teer Bhanga Dheu	Yes	Yes	Yes	
1981	Bodhan	Yes	Yes	Yes	
1982	Shathe Shathyang	Yes	Yes	Yes	
1984	Dadamoni	Yes	Yes	Yes	
1984	Prayashchitta	Yes	Yes	Yes	
1984	Laal Golap	Yes	Yes	Yes	
1985	Sandhya Pradip	Yes	Yes	Yes	
1986	Swargashukh	Yes	Yes	Yes	
1986	Anurager Chhowan	Yes	Yes	Yes	
1986	Abhiman	Yes	Yes	Yes	
1986	Abhishaap	Yes	Yes	Yes	
1986	Bouma	Yes	Yes	Yes	
1986	Shatru	Yes	Yes	No	Hindi debut; Remake of Shatru
1987	Mahamilan	Yes	Yes	Yes	
1987	Amar Sangee	No	Yes	Yes	
1988	Debibaran	Yes	Yes	Yes	
1989	Shawtorupa	Yes	Yes	Yes	
1989	Aakrosh	Yes	Yes	Yes	
1989	Mangal Deep	Yes	Yes	Yes	
1989	Bandini	Yes	Yes	Yes	
1989	Hum Intezaar Karenge	Yes	Yes	Yes	Hindi film
1990	Debota	Yes	Yes	Yes	
1991	Ahankar	Yes	Yes	Yes	
1991	Bourani	Yes	Yes	Yes	
1991	Abhagini	Yes	Yes	Yes	
1991	Nabab	Yes	Yes	Yes	
1992	Ananya	Yes	Yes	Yes	
1992	Bahadur	Yes	Yes	Yes	
1993	Shraddhanjali	Yes	Yes	Yes	
1993	Ishwar Parameshwar	Yes	Yes	Yes	
1994	Geet Sangeet	Yes	Yes	Yes	
1994	Chhoti Bahoo	Yes	No	No	Hindi film; Remake of Chhoto Bou
1995	Sangharsha	Yes	Yes	Yes	
1995	Mejo Bou	Yes	Yes	Yes	
1996	Puja	Yes	Yes	Yes	
1996	Mahan	Yes	Yes	Yes	
1997	Sriman Bhootnath	Yes	Yes	Yes	
1997	Bidroho	Yes	Yes	Yes	
1997	Loafer	Yes	Yes	Yes	
1997	Boro Bou	Yes	Yes	Yes	
1997	Aajker Santan	Yes	Yes	Yes	
1998	Chowdhury Paribaar	Yes	Yes	Yes	
1998	Asal Nakal	Yes	Yes	Yes	
1999	Sundar Bou	Yes	Yes	Yes	
1999	Niyoti	Yes	Yes	Yes	
1999	Sindoor Khela	No	No	Yes	
2001	Pratibad	Yes	Yes	Yes	
2003	Santrash	Yes	Yes	Yes	
2004	Ram Laxman	Yes	Yes	Yes	
2004	Devdoot	Yes	Yes	Yes	
2006	Ekai Aksho	Yes	Yes	Yes	
2007	Nabab Nandini	Yes	Yes	Yes	
2007	Tulkalam	Yes	Yes	Yes	

=== As editor ===
Year	Editor
Sriman Bhootnath	Yes

== Awards ==
- Kalakar Awards
