= Ranjit Mallick =

Indian, Bengali actor

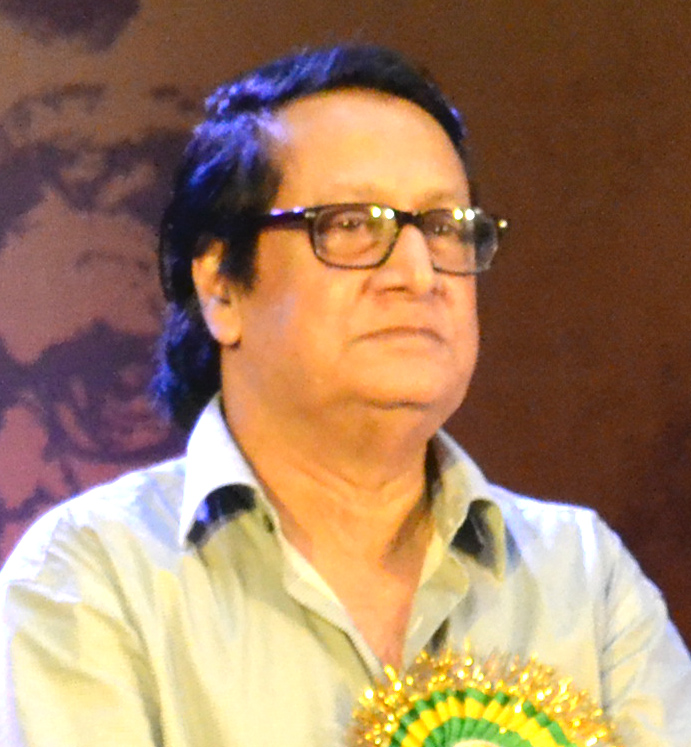
- Mallick in 2012
- Born: 28 September 1944(82 years); Calcutta, Bengal Presidency, British India (present-day Kolkata, West Bengal, India)
- Occupation: Actor
- Years active: 1971–present
- Spouse: Deepa Mallick
- Children: Koel Mallick
- Relatives: Nispal Singh (son-in-law)
- Awards: Banga Bibhushan

Ranjit Mallick (Bengali pronunciation: [rɔndʒit mɔllick]; born 28 September 1944) is an Indian actor and producer who predominantly works in Bengali cinema. In a career spanning over five decades, Mallick is regarded as one of the greatest and most successful actors in the history of Indian cinema. Known for his appearances in both fields of mainstream and parallel films, he is referred to as "Pratibadi Nayak" (Bengali for "The Rebellious Hero"). His accolades include BFJA Awards, WBFJA Awards and Filmfare Awards. He was also the Sheriff of Kolkata for the year 2014.

== Early life ==
Ranjit was born on 28 September 1944 in Calcutta, West Bengal, into the Mallick Bari of Bhowanipore He is the grandson of Bengali scientist Indumadhab Mallick. His nickname is Ranju. He studied at the Asutosh College and later at the Syamaprasad College of the University of Calcutta.

== Career ==
Ranjit started his career with Bengali director Mrinal Sen's film Interview (1971). He received the International Best Actor Award from Karlovy Vary for this work. He then became a popular romantic hero in the 1970s and featured in films like Mouchak, Devi Chaudharani, Raag Anuraag, and Sayang Siddha. Satyajit Ray cast him in his film Shakha Proshakha, where he portrayed a young man caught between values and tradition.

Since the 1984 film Shatru by Anjan Choudhury, he started working in action roles. His daughter, Koel Mallick is also an actress in the Bengali film industry. He is the President of "West Bengal Motion Picture Artists' Forum".

== Awards ==
- Kalakar Awards
- Veteran Indian Bengali film actor Ranjit Mallick honoured with ‘bbarta award’ for 2017 in recognition of his outstanding contributions to Bengali cinema.
- He was honoured in Kolkata's 16th Tele Cine Awards with the Lifetime Achievement award for his outstanding contributions in Bengali films in 2017.
- Banga Bibhushan in 2012
- Best actor in Karlovy Vary International film festival for Interview(1971)
