= Suparna Kanti Ghosh =

Indian composer (born 1958)

Suparna Kanti Ghosh সুপর্ণকান্তি ঘোষ
- Born: 1958 (age 67–68)
- Origin: Kolkata, West Bengal
- Genres: Classical music, ballad
- Occupations: Composer and music director
- Years active: 1976–present
- Label: Saregama
- Notable work: "Coffee Houser Sei Addata", "Shey Amar Choto Bon"
- Father: Nachiketa Ghosh

Suparna Kanti Ghosh (/sʊpɔːrnoʊ kɑːntɪ ɡhoʊʃh/) is an Indian composer and music director who primarily works for Bengali songs. He is best known for composing the song "Coffee Houser Sei Addata" in 1983. He is the son of Nachiketa Ghosh, Indian film song composer. He made his debut by composing "Shey Amar Choto Bon" in 1978. He composed 56 songs sung by Manna Dey. He released an album in 2018 named Gurukripahi Kevalam, which had unreleased songs by Nachiketa Ghosh. He also composed songs for contemporary Indian singers such as Hemanta Mukhopadhyay, Arati Mukherjee and Bhupen Hazarika.

In 2021, Ghosh composed an unreleased song written by Gauriprasanna Mazumder, sung by singer Shamik Pal. It was released in the YouTube channel named Srinivas Music. The music arrangement was made by Shamik Guha Roy.

== Early life and debut (1978–1980) ==
Suparna Kanti Ghosh's father Nachiketa Ghosh died in 1976. Shankar Barman suggested him to sing and compose music. Ajoy Biswas, a film director asked him to compose songs for him. Ghosh composed songs written by lyricists Pulak Bandyopadhyay and Gauriprasanna Mazumdar which Nachiketa Ghosh did not take. Biswas later met Manna Dey on flight to Bombay and told him about Ghosh. Dey called him after returning to Kolkata. The next day, Ghosh went to Dey's stated place in Hedua, Kolkata. After hearing him singing his own song, Dey gave him an envelope with a song written by Pulak Bandyopadhyay. The song was arranged by Y. S. Mulkey. Within two or three days, Ghosh gave Dey the composed song after Dey returned from Bombay.

Ghosh's next ballad, "Khela Football Khela" was also sung by Manna Dey. The song was made in memory of the 16 people who died in the August 16, 1980 stampede during a match in Eden Gardens stadium. The money gained after the song was released was given to the families of the people. Before the song, Nachiketa Ghosh composed "Sob Khelar Sera," also sung by Dey.

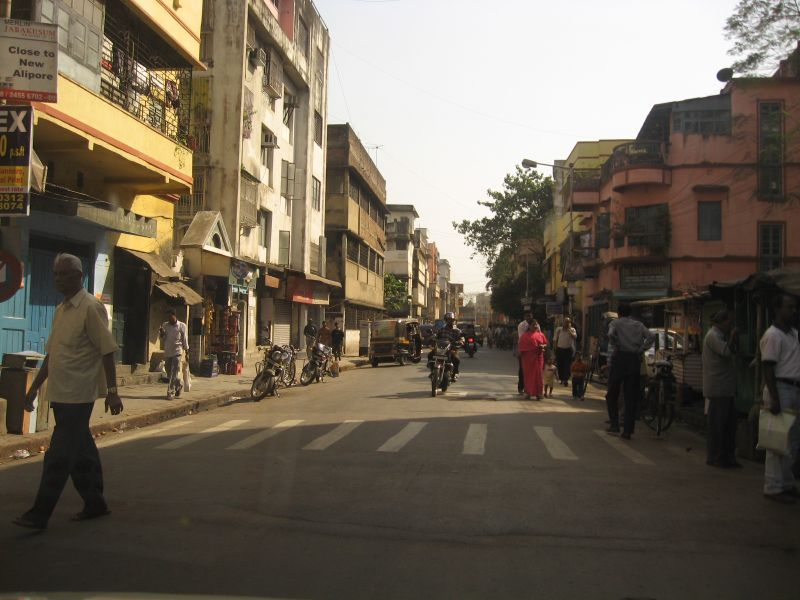
New Alipore

Ghosh achieved his Master's from Calcutta University. He passed his M Com and CIB. He got his computer degree from abroad. He learned singing and instrument playing from London, England, from where he also learned piano and specialization in Western music. He took training in classical music and learned tabla from Ustad Govinda Ghosh. Ghosh also trained in guitar. During his studies in Calcutta University, he could not pay for his graduation examination. Ghosh went to Manna Dey, who asked him to come to his house on Sunday, the next day. Ghosh and Dey went by train to Kulti, Bardhaman, where they performed at a musical festival. Ghosh stayed at a guest house for the night. He returned to Kolkata the next morning and paid his university fees.

== Coffee Houser Sei Addata (1983) ==
=== Composition and background ===
Suparna Kanti Ghosh had gone to Paris for a trip. He visited Montmartre, where he saw people painting and chatting at coffeehouses. Salvador Dali and Vincent van Gogh and others lived there. Among the places shown by his guide, he obtained the idea of "adda" (hangout) from the place.

In late 1982, Ghosh lived in New Alipore, Kolkata, and was studying for his M Com exams. Shakti Thakur was also in the house. Gauirprasanna Mazumdar came into his house asking for him. Ghosh challenged Mazumdar to write a song based on an "adda" (hangout) with reference to the College Street Coffee House. Mazumdar sang the first two lines there. He wrote the song's lyrics overnight. When Mazumdar presented the song to Ghosh, he recommended him to add a last stanza to the song.

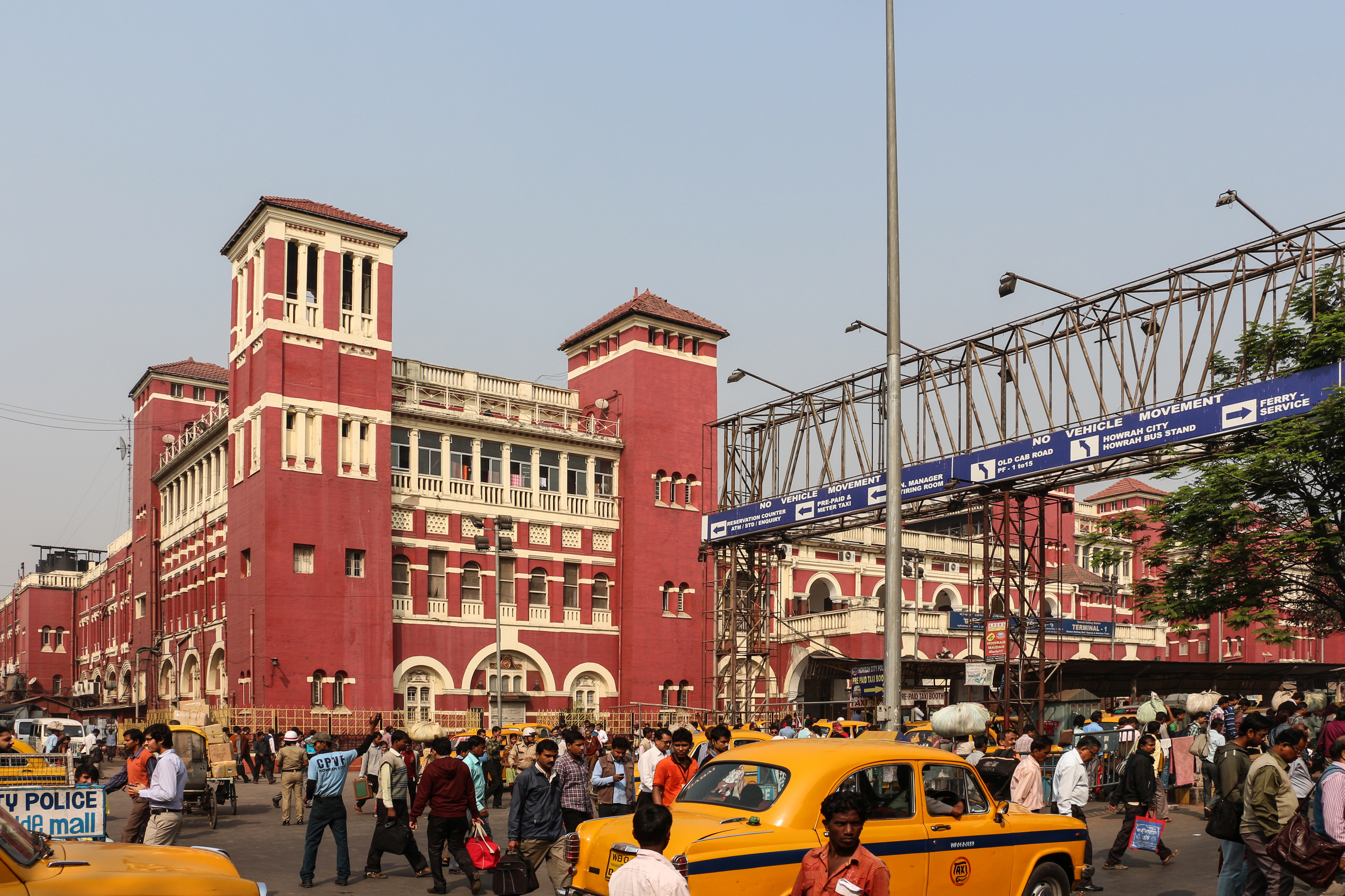
Howrah station outside

Ten days later, Mazumdar was sitting inside a train halted in Howrah railway station and thought of the last stanza. He wrote the lines on a white paper inside a cigarette pack and gave it to a man on the station. The man delivered the packet to Ghosh's house in New Alipore, with the last lines on it. The song was taken to Manna Dey's recording studio in Bombay. When introduced to Dey, he asked "What song can be made from this? How will you fit the tune and melody to the words?". Dey recorded the song in 1983.

=== Comments on the song ===
The characters Nikhilesh, Amol, Moidul, Sujata, Roma Roy and D'Souza are primarily mentioned in the song. Nur Ahmed Moidul was a sports journalist born in 1936 in North 24 Parganas and moved to Dhaka in 1964. When he died in 2014, newspapers stated him to be the same Moidul from the song. Ghosh in an interview with Bdnews24.com commented, "There are so many people named Moidul in the city of Kolkata, if they say they are the characters in this song – then what else can I say!" He said all the characters mentioned in the song to be entirely fictional and made up by Gauriprasanna Mazumdar.

== Visit to Bangladesh (2022) ==
Suparna Kanti Ghosh went to Dhaka in Bangladesh in the afternoon of 21 April 2022 and stayed at the house of lyricist Pannalal Dutta. He stayed in Bangladesh till 27 April. Ghosh in an interview with Dhaka Mail remarked that in his early life his father (Nachiketa Ghosh) wanted him to study properly and wanted him to be a doctor. His family's occupation is mostly doctors. His grandfather was the attending physician of Bidhan Chandra Roy, the second Chief Minister of West Bengal. He said he would have studied medicine if his father was alive. Ghosh said that he first sung in the recording of Thakurmar Jhuli, where his father gave him the lead role as he couldn't find anyone else.

According to Bangladesh Sangbad Sangstha (BSS news), the visit was the first time Ghosh went to Bangladesh. He pledged to compose one of his own songs while in the country. A few years before, he composed a song on Sheikh Mujibur Rahman, the founding president of Bangladesh. He played the bongo instrument in Nachiketa Ghosh's songs from about age 7 or 8. The previous song he composed on Mujibur Rahman was named "Amader Sheikh Mujib," written by Dhakaite lyricist Pannalal Dutta. It was sung by Surojit Chatterjee of the Bhoomi band, based in Kolkata. A video was also created, which captured Rahman's life story from Tungipara to the earning of his nickname as "Bangabandhu," directed by Kolkatan director Rawnak Banerjee.
