= Coffee Houser Sei Addata =

1983 song by Manna Dey

Song by Manna Dey

from the album Hits of Manna Dey, Vol. 2
- Language: Bengali
- Released: 1983 (Note: The release date is cited by some sources as January 11, 1982.)
- Studio: HMV Studios (Bombay)
- Genre: Ballad
- Length: 6:27
- Label: Saregama India Ltd.
- Composer: Suparna Kanti Ghosh
- Lyricist: Gauriprasanna Mazumdar

Music video
- "Coffee Houser Sei Addata" on YouTube

"Coffee Houser Sei Addata" (Note: Also known as "Coffee Houser Sei Addata Aaj Aar Nei" or simply "Coffee House") (Note: Bengali: "কফি হাউসের সেই আড্ডাটা আজ আর নেই") (English: That Coffee-house adda is lost today) (Note: Alternative English translation: Those get-togethers at the coffee-house are no longer there today) is a Bengali song by Indian playback singer Manna Dey from the album Hits of Manna Dey, Volume 2, released in 1983 by record label Saregama. It was written by Gauriprasanna Mazumdar and was composed by Suparna Kanti Ghosh. It is considered one of the most popular songs of the Bengali language. (Note: Multiple references:)

The melody of "Auld Lang Syne" by Robert Burns serves as the song's opening. The song describes seven fictional friends who once gathered at the College Street Coffee House in Kolkata, primarily talking about their changed lives, losses, careers, dreams, illnesses, and disappearances and legacies. The final stanza shows that although the original group has disappeared from various reasons, the Coffee House remains a place where new generations continue to share memories and stories.

"Coffee Houser Sei Addata" is regarded as a cult classic Bengali song and a cultural symbol of West Bengal and the wider Bengal region, including Bangladesh, which reflects the "adda" tradition that gained popularity in the 1960s and 1970s. It later came to be regarded as the anthem of the College Street Coffee House, which honored Manna Dey by hanging his portrait on their wall after his death. The song has since inspired films, remakes, media discussions, and cultural retrospectives, becoming a lasting symbol of Bengali nostalgia, heritage, and adda culture, as stated by Anika Khan. Manna Dey deemed it an all-time favorite among the Bengali community in his book.

== Recording and release ==
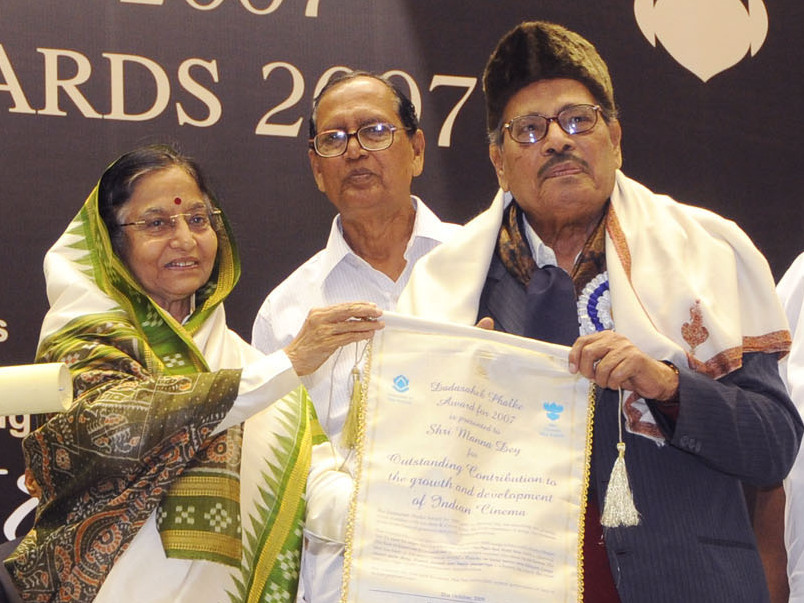
Manna Dey in 2009

Before composing "Coffee Houser Sei Addata" for Manna Dey, Suparna Kanti Ghosh, the son of Nachiketa Ghosh, had written the song "Shey Amar Choto Bon" in 1978, which Dey sung and Ghosh gained contact with Dey. Gauriprasanna Mazumdar was a friend of Nachiketa Ghosh. Before "Coffee Houser Sei Addata" was considered, Ghosh went on a short trip to Paris, visiting Montmartre district, where coffeehouses served as meeting places for people to sit, converse, and exchange thoughts. As the tour guide showed him the areas, Ghosh learned about the idea of a hangout between Bengali people, an adda, when seeing the people and the coffees.

In 1983, Ghosh lived in New Alipore, in Kolkata, where he was studying for his exams, and practicing a song with Shakti Thakur and some of his friends, including Mazumdar who came after a short time. After chatting for some time, Ghosh entrusted Mazumdar with writing a song based on an adda theme, with specific reference to the College Street Coffee House. Mazumdar came up with the first two lines of the song in front of Ghosh, which he spoke on the spot, and after returning home, Mazumdar continued writing the rest of it through the nighttime until the next morning. Mazumdar wrote most of lyrics within two or three days, but when he showed them, Ghosh said that the song lacked a climax and wanted him to add a final stanza. Mazumdar was opposed to Ghosh's idea of adding a last stanza, and mentioned that in the last stanza of Ghosh's 1978 song "Shey Amar Choto Bon", a conclusion was brought to the overall ballad. He felt that adding an ending stanza would make the song end in a similar way to the 1978 song, and stated, "I am ending this song in a new style! Adding additional lines like that does not make any sense". Mazumdar was, however, ultimately convinced by Ghosh after a long conversation and agreed to add a last stanza.

Nine days later, Mazumdar was inside a Mumbai or Chennai-bound train, stalled at Howrah railway station, and thought of the last stanza, after which he wrote the last lines on a white paper inside a cigarette packet. He then gave it to a man at Howrah station and asked him to send it to Ghosh's house. Mazumdar told him that Ghosh's house was near East Alipore petrol pump, but could not remember the full address. The man delivered it to his house the next day. Ghosh felt the song was complete after receiving it and went to Mumbai four days later, taking the paper with him. Mazumdar at this time wrote other charted songs for singer Asha Bhosle, but he expressed regret about not writing for Manna Dey, which was mostly done during the period by other lyricists. Mazumdar restored his writing contacts with Dey after he wrote "Coffee House".

On the same day he received the lyrics, Ghosh started composing the music while he was travelling on a sleeper train to Mumbai for a live recording. He turned on his bedside lamp on the upper train berth, and began by humming and memorizing the tune, composing the song for most of the day. The next day, Ghosh brought the finalized composition to Mazumdar in a studio located in Mumbai. Mazumdar brought his arranger Y. S. Mulkey, with Ghosh suggesting using the melody of the Irish folk song "Auld Lang Syne" as the opening to the song, which Mulkey agreed to. The next day, they went to the recording studio where Manna Dey, after briefly being concerned how the lyrics of the song could be set to music, agreed to sing it. Mulkey handed him a harmonium to practice the song. He was accompanied by a guitarist named Tony Vaz. "Coffee Houser Sei Addata" was recorded by Dey in Mumbai (Bombay) in 1983, in a recording studio named HMV Studios.

In the words of Manna Dey, Gauriprasanna Mazumdar depicted the picture of the coffee house with a few friends in the song's lyrics, which Dey considered to be "simply extraordinary". He acknowledged Suparna Kanti Ghosh to have created and composed "beautiful tunes" which were pertinent to the song's overall popularity, with Dey stating that he only presented what Mazumdar and Ghosh made to the audience. Although the College Street Coffee House was located very close to his house in Kolkata, Dey said he never visited it before he sang and released the song in 1983, but did visit it several times after. In his career, Dey was not willing to take credit for the song. He regarded lyricist Mazumdar and composer Ghosh as the creators of it. Dey remarked that the song would still have been a superhit even if singers like Hemanta Mukhopadhyay or Shyamal Mitra sang it.

The song was released in 1983 under the label of Saregama, and later included on the compilation album Hits of Manna Dey, Vol. 2. In an interview, Ghosh said that he did not receive anything for composing it. In 2002, Manna Dey released a sequel to the song titled "Swapner Coffee House" under a different record label. Sung in the same scale as the original song, the sequel was written by Shamindra Ray Chowdhury and composed by Suparna Kanti Ghosh. As the original spool of the song had been lost, Ghosh arranged a new spool for the sequel. This song was reported to have a better arrangement and melodical diversity, but did not become widely known among Bengali listeners and those who heard "Coffee Houser Sei Addata". Manna Dey was unhappy with the commercial performance of it and stated that it could not reach a major milestone and popularity to have the audience know what happened to the six friends of the narrator in the first song.

== Composition ==
=== Background ===
The Indian Coffee House (ICH), the chief influence and topic behind the song "Coffee House", initially gained prominence from the visits by customers who migrated from Bangladesh or other neighboring countries in the wake of the Partition of 1947. The bhadralok class of North India read about coffee houses from newspapers and became aware of the presence of such facilities and the presence of coffee houses in the Western world, from when they perceived coffee and coffee houses as an exotic commodity, available in India at the time only in exclusive hotels and restaurants. Affordability was the main interest of Indian coffee houses in the 1940s and 1950s. From its opening, the ICH became relatively famous through its cheap prices and visitors who would spend time in the coffee house adda, later becoming special to the middle class.

=== Lyrics ===
Keyboard cover of the song tune
The tune of "Coffee Houser Sei Addata" on a piano keyboard.

The lyrics of "Coffee House" share personal experiences and individual rituals of people and seven friends who visited the coffee house, preserved in a collective memory and expressed through a lens of nostalgia. The first stanza introduces the whereabouts and struggles of the narrator's close friends: Nikhilesh, Moidul, D'Souza, Roma Roy, and Amol.

The second stanza introduces Sujata, said to be happy and prosperous in her marriage to a wealthy person, reflected in her lifestyle by a large collection of diamonds and jewels. Both stanzas juxtapose people from two dramatically different social and economic groups in postcolonial Bengal, connecting individual experiences with wider societal shifts.

The third stanza describes friends' rituals and activities at the coffee house, including smoking of Charminar cigarettes, debates and chats about poets like Bishnu Dey and painters like Jamini Roy, as well as habitual meetings, which by repetition turns "fleeting memory" into "lasting cultural memory". The fourth stanza goes through the unpublished poems of Amol, the theater roles of Roma Roy, and Moidul's daily routine as a writer, who regularly read out his own newspaper articles at the coffee house. It defines their potentials, failures and achievements, who all became a part of the broader community that frequented the coffee house.

The fifth and last stanza delineates the coffee house itself and the impermanence of the people who met there. It remarks that the original group of friends are gone, but the tables and cups are still present, and the friends have been replaced by future generations. It also states the house remains a place of continued memories and exchanged stories.

== Theme and characters ==
=== Themes and analysis ===
In Kolkata, mainstream Bengali media and culture played an important role in popularizing the Indian Coffee House by promoting adda culture and publicizing the Coffee House as a benchmark of adda, in which "Coffee Houser Sei Addata" served a significant role, considered to have reminisced the "lost era of Kolkata's coffee house gatherings". With Manna Dey performing the song at "his best capability", it produced an imagery of the College Street Coffee House located in Kolkata on College Street, stimulating the collective memory and nostalgia of the Bengali listeners regardless of age or location. The song impacted Bengali audiences, even those living far away from the home, who still related with the song's theme and the social practices demonstrated in it.

Considered to be the anthem of College Street Coffee House, "Coffee Houser Sei Addata" is the best-known representation of that place. The song "immortalizes the hours that a group of friends spent" making interactions and chatting at their coffee house table. Mazumdar's writing document some real-life elements such as Charminar, a brand of cigarettes; and make mentions of Bishnu Dey and Jamini Roy, both real-life artists. The song also makes suggestions about the disappearance of the original group of the seven friends and fading of "the excitement of youth". Although the song lyrics reflect that the original group of the seven friends are lost, the coffee house and its addas still remain intact. The friend group talk about their hopes and dreams that they imagined their career would be, using their thoughts, words, music and political actions. A part of the song's refrain mentions the "lost golden afternoons" which are not there anymore and suggests a longing of time. From this time, the coffee house adda became famous.

The lyrics and words of "Coffee House" implied many listeners to think that old people, poets, journalists, and people like Manna Dey visit the coffee house and have sessions there after its release. As of 2018, the coffee house was visited by people of all ages, ranging from youth to old people, and of many occupations. Many days, the coffee house was populated by the presence of multiple people. "Coffee Houser Sei Addata" also popularized the Coffee House among Generation Z and Millennials (Gen Y), and introduced younger listeners to the place. Around this many coffee houses and coffee chats were associated with specific objects like the wooden chairs, cheap and hot cups of coffee, and the hours spent in conversations and discussions. The days of the Coffee House in the song's lyrics is rendered to have been passed from one generation to the next. The song specifies the chats or addas made in the coffee house to be lost, (Note: "In music, late Manna Dey's once-chart-buster song - 'Coffee house-er sei āddā-ta āj ar nei [That Coffee House āddā is there no more], a eulogy to an addā that the singer sorely misses - is still quite popular and comes immediately to mind.") the friends to have settled in distant places, the remembrance of their memories. It has been described as a Bengali nostalgic song, showing intertwine with Bengali nostalgia.

"Coffee Houser Sei Addata" was written by Gauriprasanna Mazumdar, described as a song capturing the times spent by the seven friends in the Indian Coffee House (which owns the College Street Coffee House), which he termed in his writings as "golden late afternoons". The narrator introduces the members in the song, giving a brief description about each of his friends. It includes successes, frustration, tragedies and disappointments which the six friends experienced later in the lives, after the coffee gatherings had stopped. It has been interpreted as a lasting symbol and memory of the College Street Coffee House and is often described as a reminder to it.

=== Characters ===
In an interview with Bdnews24.com in 2020, Suparna Kanti Ghosh remarked that all the seven friends were fictional, as made up by Mazumdar. He said that many people before had falsely claimed to be the characters from the song. Before it was recorded, Ghosh commented on never visiting the Coffee House at College Street, also mentioning Mazumdar and Dey to have never visited it at least before the song was recorded. A few years after it was recorded, Ghosh went to it for the first time in a blood donation camp that was hosted inside. The blood donation camp was held in the coffee house on January 9, 2026, of which composer Suparna Kanti Ghosh was the chief guest. According to Ghosh, Dey wrote in his autobiography that he did go in it before the recording was done. In the English autobiography translation of Dey's book, he writes, "It used to be my favourite haunt during my college days and later, while shooting there [a film], I would grow nostalgic about the golden days that were now a thing of the past."

There are seven major characters described in the song: Nikhilesh Sanyal, Moidul, Sujata, Goanese D'Souza, Roma Roy, Amol and the unnamed narrator who remembers all the friends at the coffee house.

A sports journalist named Nur Ahmed Moidul was born in 1936 in North 24 Parganas and later moved to Bangladesh in 1968 following a riot. On his death in 2014 (aged 78), many newspapers mentioned him to be the same Moidul character in the song. He claimed during his lifetime to be the actual character, and said to have met with Sujata and Roma Roy. He also claimed to have met with Manna Dey during his teenage years. Ghosh stated his claims to be false.

Sujata, the wife of Awami League politician Waliur Rahman Reza was born in Gaibandha and educated in Calcutta Art College. She married Reza in 1972. Reza became a Member of Parliament in Bangladesh in the 1970s and was an organizer of the Liberation War. Newspapers stated her to be Sujata from the song, which Ghosh denied.

== Reception and legacy ==
According to The Telegraph, "Coffee Houser Sei Addata" emerged as a hit song and one of the most popular songs performed by Manna Dey. Md Morshedul Alam Mohabat of The Business Standard said that "Coffee House" is an "all-time favorite" because people are attracted to relatable songs—and can relate to the life stories it provides and connect with the notion that they would have to leave the memories behind. He also described it as nostalgic, which factors into its popularity. He writes that the personalities of the characters in it can me familiar to many people, making it relatable to them. It has been regarded as a song which "often shakes and comes up in the minds of the listeners", and a "commentary on life". Newspaper Prothom Alo remarked about the song that "it would be difficult to find a Bengali who has not heard 'Coffee Houser Sei Addata' in their life". BBC Bangla conducted an online ranking where people could vote for their five favorite Bengali songs, for the entirety of March 2006. On the list, "Coffee Houser Sei Addata" scored the highest among Bengali songs from West Bengal and the fourth-highest overall. (Note: The other three songs were "Amar Sonar Bangla", the national anthem of Bangladesh; "Manush Manusher Janya", sung by Assam singer Bhupen Hazarika; and Amar Bhaiyer Rokte Rangano, a patriotic song of Bangladesh.)

The sequel of the song titled "Swapner Coffee House" was not commercially successful and could not majorly connect with the listeners. It described the later situations of the seven companions who visited the coffee house and announced a reunion.

In 2022, Sohini Dasgupta, wife of filmmaker Buddhadeb Dasgupta, wrote on social media that "Coffee House" is "a loser song" and "there should be a standard for nostalgia". Dasgupta followed up by stating that she liked the lyrics, tunes and melodies of the song when she first heard it in the 1980s, but it seemed to her at the time that the song was for those who had failed and lost. In response to Dasgupta, Sudeb Dey, nephew of Manna Dey, stated that, "Kaka Manna Dey is my guru (mentor). I don't know who posted the message on Facebook. [...] Some people do it to get into the light of discussion by saying negative things. [...] At the same time she rejected the creation (song) of an artist." (Note: Originally quoted in Bengali; translated into English.) Indian film director Anik Dutta and Bangladesh's TM Ahmed Kaiser commented on Dasgupta's post saying that "the freedom of speech and commentary is available to everyone". Singer-songwriter Anupam Roy told newspaper Anandabazar Online (Patrika): "I grew up listening to this song. Of the songs Suparna Kanti Ghosh has composed, this is the best one. The song seems to have represented the coffee house of that time. I considered this to be the best song of respectable Manna Dey before. And I say the same in the future."

Dhaka Mail called it as "a timeless and nostalgic song", further writing about it, "Even today, people become nostalgic when they hear the song 'Coffee Houser Sei Addata' sung by Manna Dey. It creates a kind of ache in the heart. It reminds of the memories and recollections of the days that passed. For several decades, Bengalis of both Bengals have been nostalgic about this song. Every moment the song gives the gift of freshness of green leaves." With its lyrics centered on the College Street Coffee House, the song gave a proper idea of general coffee houses and the identity and presence of the coffee house on College Street, to people of both Bengals. "Coffee House" prompted concepts among the public about the role and importance of adda culture and coffee houses relating to Kolkata's intellectuals, art, and culture. Its mention of the College Street Coffee House resulted in many people going to it. According to Mazharul Islam Babla writing for Desh Rupantor, the continuity of the description of the coffee house given by Gauriprasanna Mazumdar remained affirmative and intact until the 1980s, after which it gradually degraded and did not remain intact, along with past Bengali songs and other fields no longer being able to attract the youth of the middle class.

"Coffee Houser Sei Addata" was also included as a song in commercial cassettes and music albums. Airtel Friendz, a service launched by the mobile network provider, Airtel, offered five special ringtone songs by dialing a number in Presidency which were either in English, Hindi or Bengali. The song was also included in it, being the only one in Bengali.

A compact disc (CD) named Coffee Houser Sei Addata was released by its record label Saregama/His Master's Voice in 1984, named after the song. In May 2008, two programs were held and 74 selected songs were brought out by Saregama to celebrate the 89th birthday of Dey. This collection of selected songs also included Coffee Houser Sei Addata, and was to demonstrate Dey's career.

Dey sung it live in a concert designated at the Science City auditorium in Kolkata in March 2007 which had a chat session by Suparna Kanti Ghosh themed on nostalgic and old memories, among performances by other singers. In response to Dey's death in October 2013, various tweets by users and his fans across India shared it and mentioned it in the posts in remembrance of him.

=== College Street Coffee House ===
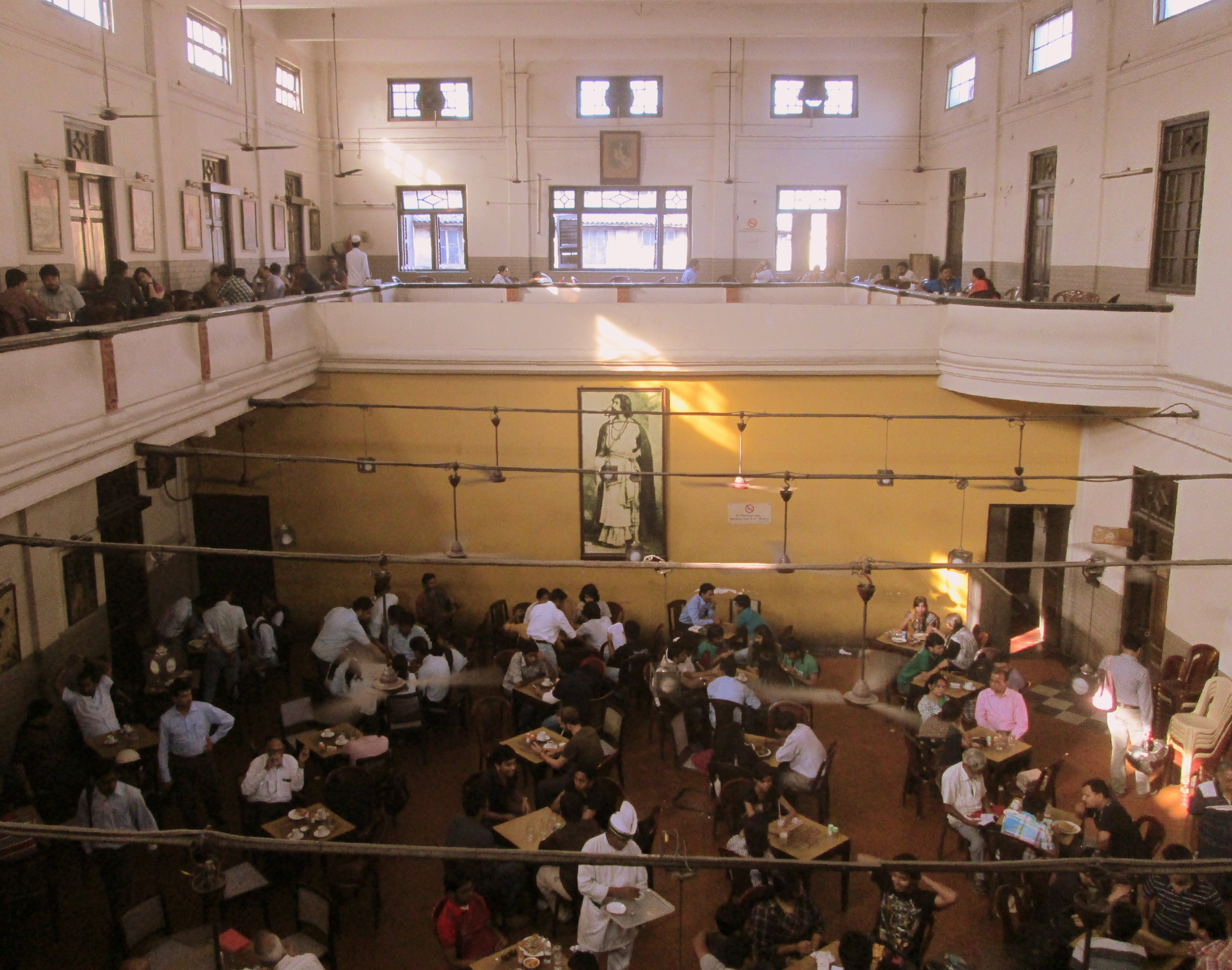
The Coffee House in 2014

College Street Coffee House, (Note: Often referred to as "Manna Dey's coffee house".) the establishment which inspired "Coffee Houser Sei Addata", had regarded it as its anthem. After Dey died on 24 October 2013, Suparna Kanti Ghosh said, "Coffee house will remain... so will remain the chat sessions, but the man who made them immortal is now no more." The coffee house management personnel and the administrative officer Dipankar Dasgupta put a portrait of Dey in the house in his remembrance. A placard was put up on the house's entrance with the words, "Legendary singer Manna Dey is no more. He will never take part in the Coffee house chat sessions. On behalf of the Coffee house family, we pray for his soul to rest in peace." As of March 17, 2024, the song had been played there for at least four decades.

Dey's songs were played on the day of his death on several intersections in Kolkata. In an article of The Daily Ittefaq in 2013, Tanvir Tarek described that a crowd of reporters and newspaper journalists had came to the coffee house to get information about them and Manna Dey. He described that several members of the management committee were sitting beside a garlanded picture of Dey. Multiple newspaper reporters were present in the coffee house, which included Kolkata TV, Tara Newz, Zee 24 Ghanta and NDTV. A member of the committee, Dipankar, said that they chose to close the coffee house in the morning after receiving news about Dey's death and commented: "And the song of dada [Manna Dey] is a tragic one, the chats will not actually remain now after he passed away. We view that as a tribute and a mark of respect. I want the name of the coffee house to be changed from 'Indian Coffee House' to 'Manna Dey's Coffee House' and will make a demand about this." Tarek stated that the "media frenzy" that occurred in it was an effect of the legacy and for the "Coffee House" song.

Dey stated that he never visited any branch of the Indian Coffee House as a student despite him and his family living in North Kolkata. He visited the coffee house only a couple of times, including when he was congratulated by the Indian Coffee Workers' co-operative Society Limited (ICWCSL) for his contributions to the publicity of the place and a few other times for his connection to a television serial and a film that was partly shot in the Coffee House at College Street. He stated that he recorded the song because he liked its lyrics and music. In October 2019 a weekly customer of the place, posted on social media that she and three of her friends went to the coffee house on a Wednesday (October 9), to chat and interact. But according to her, an employee later approached them and warned her about a phone they wanted to charge. The employee said to them that they did not understand Bengali and asked her and her friends to explain in Hindi, as per her post. In their conversations, she and her three friends made statements about Manna Dey and "Coffee Houser Sei Addata", written by Chakraborty in her post to have introduced the younger generations to general coffee house cultures. The employee remarked that they had never heard of Manna Dey before nor had known the song.

Manna Dey visited the coffee house on February 19, 2002. He wore his usual cap and gave out autographs. Snehasish Chakraborty, present in the house, stated that the College Street Coffee House was never so crowded before the song's release. Dey's autobiography book, titled Jibaner Jalsaghare, was published in 2005. A documentary was created for it which included a filming part that was done in the coffee house in remembrance of the song. Zaheed Hussain, an employee of the Coffee House, and Sarfaraz Ahmed, secretary of the establishment, both said that Manna Dey immortalized the Coffee House by singing the song. Sanjeevan Gaur, an waiter at the coffee house who joined in 1982, remarked that he enjoyed serving people like Soumitra Chatterjee, Manna Dey and others in his 40-year-career that ended in 2023.

== Cover versions ==
Sudeb Dey sang multiple covers of the song, and added: "In light of my profession, I sing various songs of uncle [Manna Dey] across the country. Today if I don't sing 'Coffee House', then the audience won't let me get up from my seat." Singer Sagarika Bhattacharjee also performed a cover version in 2023. An altered version, named "Coffee house er shei adda ta fire pete chai, fire pete chai", was sung by celebrities on the occasion of the Coffee House's reopening on July 12, 2009. In November 2011, singer Rupankar Bagchi sang a cover version of it in an event organized by Anandabazar Patrika.

In December 2020, a modified version of the song titled "Coffee House-er shei addata phire elo" was sung in the inauguration of the New Town Coffee House in New Town, Kolkata. As a part of the cultural festival at the Zahed Hasan Auditorium of the Bishwo Shahitto Kendro in August 2026, singers Tanvira, Zakir and their son Shahriver Hossain performed several timeless Bengali songs from the golden age era, including "Coffee Houser Sei Addata" sung by Tanvir and Zakir and accompanied by guitar played by Shahriver.

== In popular culture ==
On August 29, 2025, the Bengali feature film Coffee House, starring Sangita Konar as Sujata, was released publicly in West Bengal. Its title song was sung by Bollywood singer Vinod Rathod, who traveled to Kolkata to record it.

In November 2025, directors Jenny Sarkar and Dipayan Mondal and production house Suan Silver Screen announced the release of a suspense/thriller film named Coffee Houser Sei Addata, (Note: Alternatively spelled as Coffee Houser Sei Adda Ta.) starring Anusha Viswanathan, Soumya Mukherjee, Priyanka Bhattacharya and Roopa Ganguly. The film focuses on the story of Sujata, who comes back into her ancestral home in North Bengal, feeling sentimental. She suddenly and mysteriously disappears from her home's tea garden. Aheri, her granddaughter who is a musician, returns to India from England and searches for her. She finds some old letters and an old diary bearing the lyrics of "Coffee House" along with the stories of six friends from the 1980s who used to hang out in a coffee house. The shooting was scheduled to start from October 7, 2025. Arijit Singh is said to be singing a new cover of the song. Sarkar and Mondal commented, "Since childhood, I – like countless others – have grown up listening to Manna Dey's timeless classic song. The nostalgia of that song, its celebration of friendship, its reflections on relationships – these things have always moved us deeply. [...] That thought became the starting point."

== See also ==
- One More Cup of Coffee (Valley Below) – Song by Bob Dylan about coffee
- Category:Songs written by Gauriprasanna Mazumdar
- Category:Manna Dey songs
