= Indian Coffee House =

Restaurant chain in India, run by co-operative societies

- Product type: Restaurant; Retail beverages
- Country: India
- Introduced: 1958; 68 years ago
- Markets: India

Indian Coffee House is a restaurant chain in India, run by a series of worker co-operative societies. It has strong presence across India with nearly 400 coffee houses.

== History ==
The consumption of Turkish coffee, is attested to in the Mughal court, and appears in Mughal art, from the 16th century, as is the existence of Coffeehouses 'qahwa khanas' in Shahjahanabad (Old Delhi) and Lucknow. The domestic cultivation and consumption of coffee in Dutch India, Portuguese India, and French India, from the 18th century, was also observed and reported. French India leaving a legacy of coffee serving Café.

During the late 1890s, the idea of an "Indian Coffee House" chain was formed. The India Coffee House chain was started by the Coffee Cess Committee, the first outlet – then named India Coffee House – opened in Churchgate, Bombay in 1936, and was operated by the Indian Coffee Board. In the course of the 1940s there were nearly 50 Coffee Houses all over British India. Post partition, Pakistan inherited the branches of Indian Coffee Houses in its major cities and continued the coffee house legacy as a social place in fostering intellectual discussions.

In India, due to a change in the policy in the mid-1950s, the Coffee Board decided to close down the Coffee Houses. Encouraged by the communist leader A. K. Gopalan (AKG), the workers of the Coffee Board began a movement and compelled the Coffee Board to agree to hand over the outlets to the workers who then formed Indian Coffee Workers' Co-operatives and renamed the network as Indian Coffee House. A co-operative began in Bangalore on 19 August 1957, and one was established in Delhi on 27 December 1957. Later Bellary and Madras Societies were separated from their mother societies. Malviya Marg Karam Chand Chowk Branch, Jabalpur serves as the head office of ICWCS. In October 2018, Indian Coffee House opened its 8th branch of Jabalpur.

== Management ==
There are 13 co-operative societies in the country to run the coffee houses. These societies are governed by managing committees elected from the employees. The societies affiliated under All India Coffee Workers' Co- operative Societies Federation formed 17 December 1960.

== Branches ==
=== Kerala ===
There are two societies in Kerala.

- India Coffee Board Workers' Co-operative Society Ltd. No.4227, Thrissur: Established on 10 February 1958. The first Indian Coffee House opened at Thrissur on 8 March 1958. It was also the fourth ICH in the country. The society have more than 50 branches across Thrissur, Ernakulam, Idukki, Kottayam, Pathanamthitta, Alappuzha, Kollam and Thiruvananthapuram.
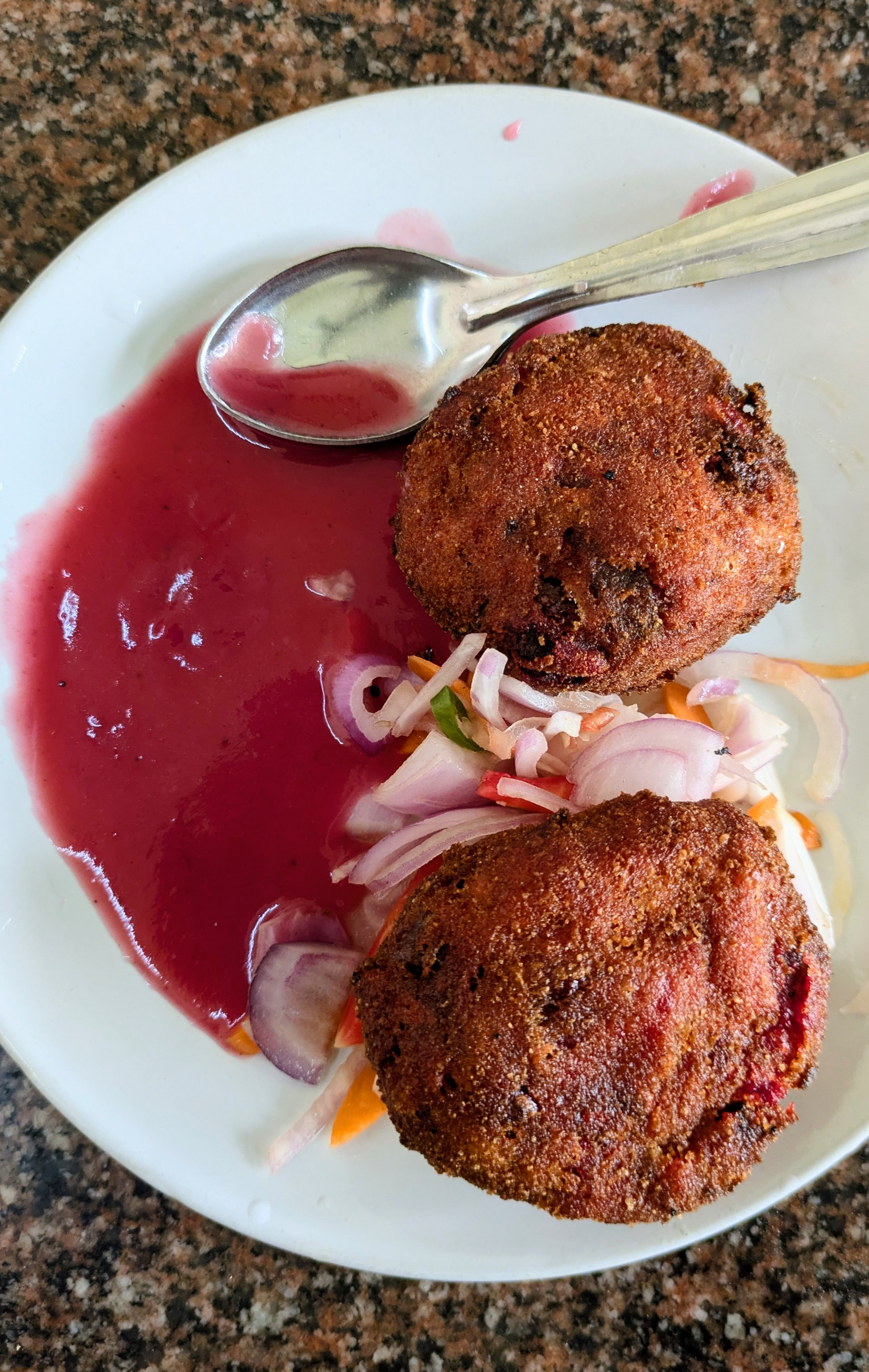
  Indian Coffee House Cutlets in Kerala with beetroot sauce

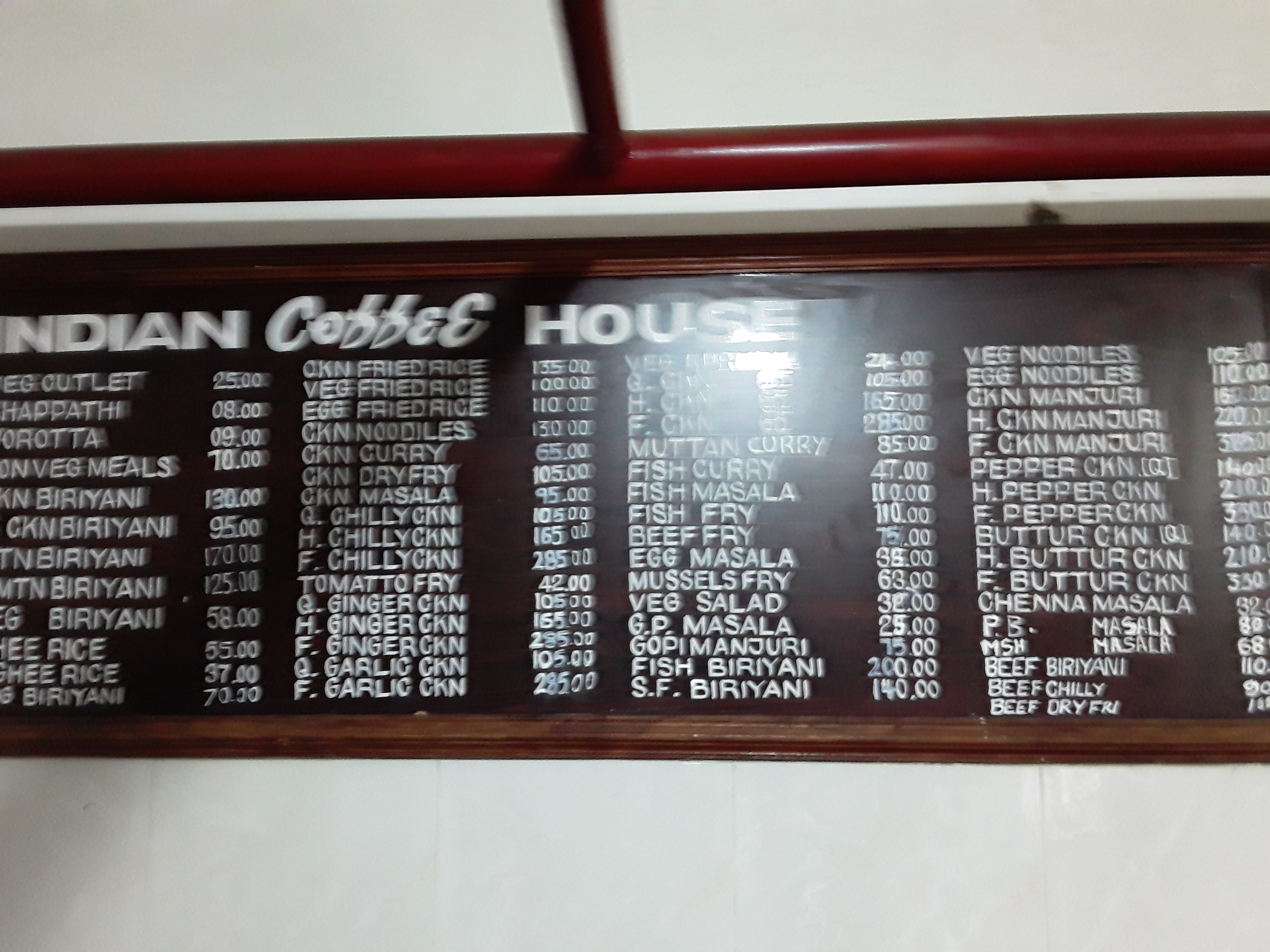
Indian Coffee House, Mananthavady

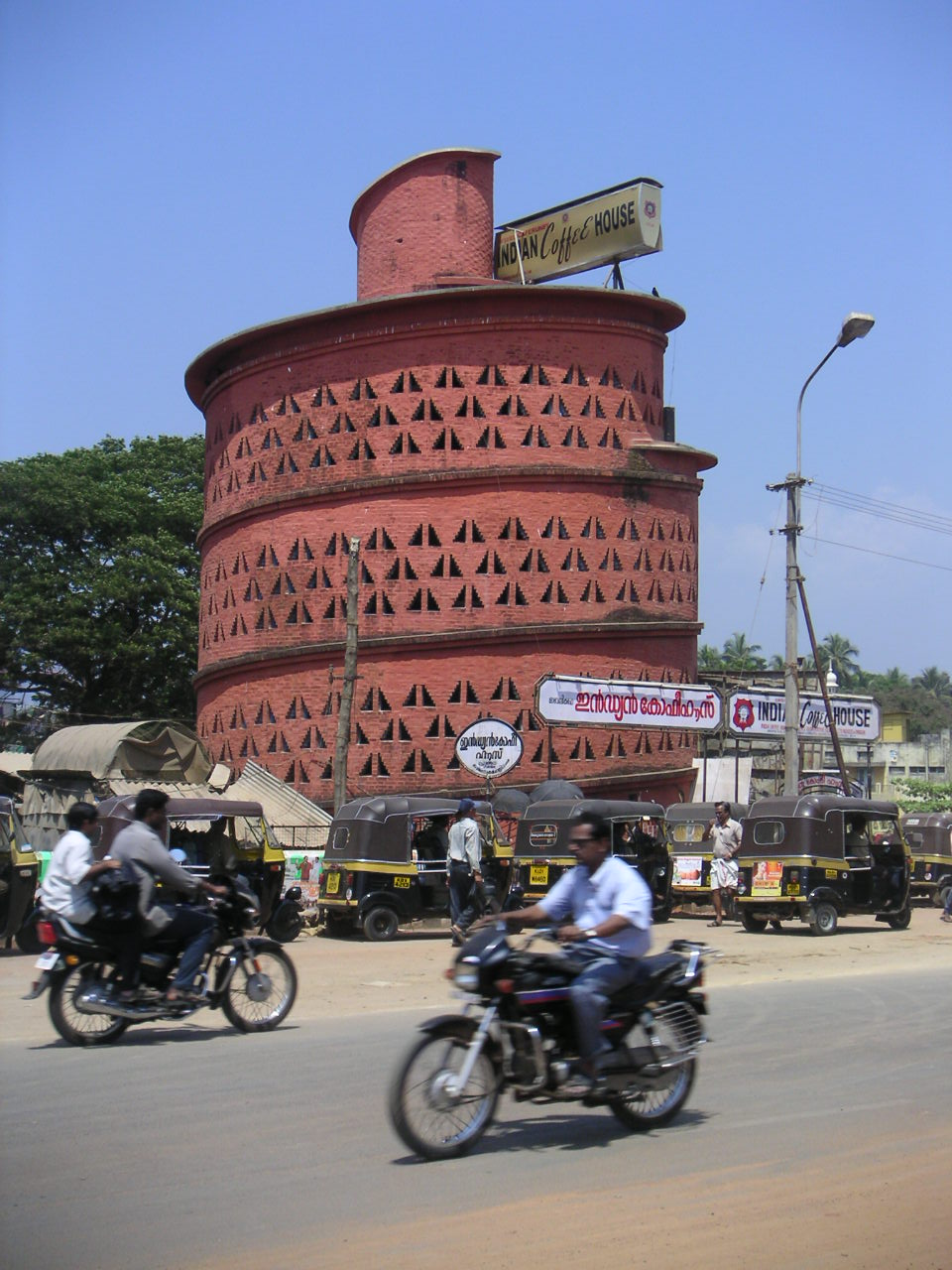
An Indian Coffee House shop at Thampanoor, Thiruvananthapuram, Kerala

Advocate T. K. Krishnan, a Communist Leader of Thrissur and N. S. Parameswaran Pillai, the State Secretary of the India Coffee Board Labour Union and a thrown-out employee of ICH were the founders of ICHs in Kerala.

- Indian Coffee Workers' Co-operative Society Ltd. No. 4317, Kannur: Established on 2 July 1958. The first Indian Coffee House started on 7 August 1958 in Thalasserry. The society have more than 25 branches across Kasaragod, Kannur, Kozhikode, Malappuram and Palakkad districts.

There is also a book about the ICH movement, in Malayalam - Coffee Housinte Katha or History of Coffee House by N. S. Parameswaran Pillai under the pen name, Nadakkal Parameswaran Pillai (Published by Current Books, Thrissur). This is the only published written history of ICH movement in any language. The book won the Abudhabi Shakthi Award as the best autobiography in 2007.

Coffee House outlets in Kerala are noted for their extensive use of beetroot in their dishes.

==== Nadakkal Parameswaran Pillai ====
N. S. Parameswaran Pillai or Nadakkal Parameswaran Pillai (1931–2010) was the co-founder of Indian Coffee Houses in Kerala with T. K. Krishnan. He is also the author of a history of ICH.

Pillai was born in Pallippuram, a hamlet of Alappuzha in Kerala on 25 May 1931. He was a school drop out after the completion of 4th standard, due to poverty. He engaged in a lot of jobs like Construction Worker, Cook, Bearer in Hotel, Wendor of Peanuts and Pan, Coir Factory Worker, Water Boy in Cochin Harbour, Clerk in Ration Depot, Clerk of Advocate etc. After a long wandering he became a last grade employee on daily wages of Coffee Board's India Coffee House of Ernakulam in 1945.

In late 1940s he became a trade unionist. He was one of the founders of India Coffee Board Labours Union. He was the secretary. Later, he has engaged in union activities at Thrissur, Coimbatore, Ootty, Madras and Kottayam also.

He has deputed to form Worker's Coffee Houses in Kerala by the union. As a result of the initiative of TK and Pillai, cooperative societies of Coffee Board workers were formed at Thrissur and Palakkad. The first Indian Coffee House of Kerala was inaugurated by AKG on 8 March 1958 in Thrissur. Pillai was the Manager cum Counter Clerk. It was the beginning of ICHs in Kerala. Pillai guided the ICH movement for three decades. He served the society at Thrissur as Founder Secretary, Sales Manager, Chief Sales Officer and chief executive officer. He was the Founder Secretary of Palakkad Society too. Pillai was also the Director, deputy chairman and Chairman of the Federation of ICH societies, New Delhi, the national umbrella organisation comprising all ICH societies of the nation.

Pillai became a secret member of undivided Communist Party of India in late 1940s. He became Secretary of Naickanal Branch of CPI. After the division in CPI he became activist of Communist Party of India (Marxist).

Parameswaran Pillai died on 17 December 2010, aged 79. Because he was an atheist, his body was cremated without religious ceremonies.

=== West Bengal ===
The Indian Coffee House has several branches in Kolkata, including the College Street branch, Central Avenue branch, Medical College Kolkata branch and Jadavpur branch. These are favourite hang-out places among the students and youth, although one can see several old-timers frequenting the coffee houses on a regular basis.

Coffee House at College Street

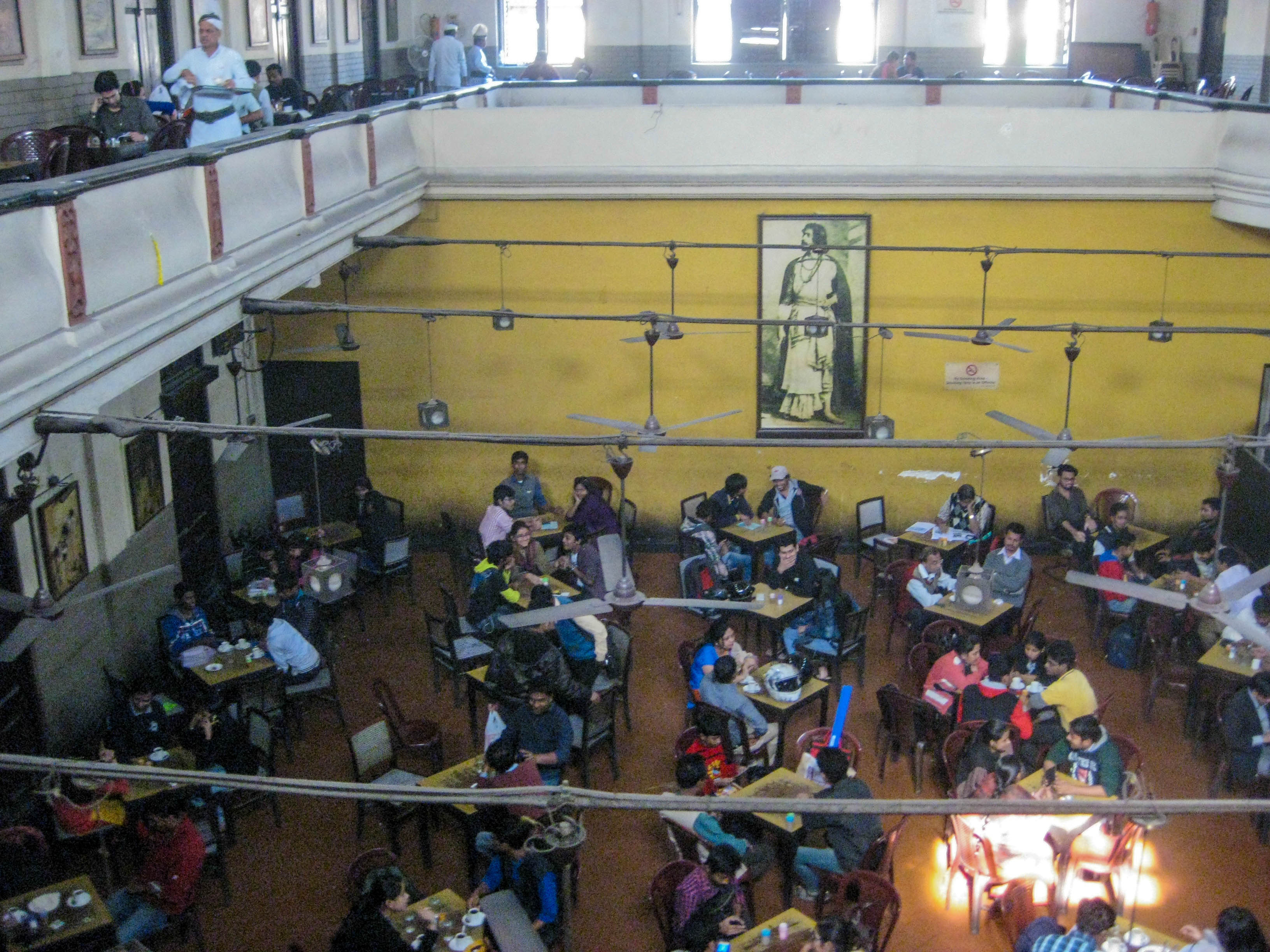
Indian Coffee House, Kolkata.

The most famous Coffee House branch in Kolkata is the one at the College Street, also known as the "Coffee House at College Street". Though popularly known as College Street Coffee house, this branch is actually on Bankim Chatterjee Street.

The history of the Coffee House at College Street can be traced to Albert Hall, which was founded in April 1876. Later, the Coffee Board decided to start a coffee joint from the Albert Hall in 1942. Notable citizens, including Aparna Sen and Sunil Gangopadhyay, were frequent visitors to the place. In 1947, the Central Government changed the name of the place to "Coffee House". The place became a meeting place for poets, artistes, literati and people from the world of art and culture. The coffee house is famous for its adda sessions, and as the breeding place of several political and cultural personalities and movements. A famous song "Coffee House-er Sei Adda-ta" (কফি হাউসের সেই আড্ডাটা), sung by Manna Dey, is based on this Coffee House.

=== Chhattisgarh ===
The Indian Coffee House has multiple restaurants in Chhattisgarh's Urban centres such as Raipur, Korba, Durg, Bhilai, Bilaspur, Raigarh, Ambikapur and Jagdalpur.

=== Chandigarh ===
The Indian Coffee House branch in Sector 17 of Chandigarh was opened in 1964 and remained popular among professionals, journalists, doctors, bureaucrats, lawyers and senior officials. The branch originally operated in Sector 22, and was shifted to Sector 17 in 1971. The Coffee House on the Punjab University campus is popular among students. In 2016, a new branch was opened in Sector 36. ICH Sector 17 was opened in 1969. The Sector 22 ICH was shifted near fountain and now shifted to Kusumpti near Shimla. The Panjab University Student Center was subletted to few ex ICH employees to run the coffee house and not a branch of ICH. ICH has its HQs at Janpath New Delhi.

=== Himachal Pradesh ===
The Indian Coffee House branch in Dharamsala used to be a popular hang-out of intelligentsia in the city. It was set up, after the district administration approached the Indian Coffee Workers' Co-operative Society, Delhi in 1991. The society decided to close it down in 2006, after losses ran over 3.5 million rupees. Indian Coffee House has a branch in Shimla.

=== Madhya Pradesh ===
Indian Coffee Workers' Co-operative Society Ltd, Jabalpur

There are more than 35 branches in Madhya Pradesh with more than 10 branches alone in the city of Jabalpur. The Malviya Marg Branch in Jabalpur is the Head Office of ICWCS. Some of the old branches are mostly frequented by the elderly population. These have been popular celebration, and meeting points for decades in these communities.

=== Karnataka ===
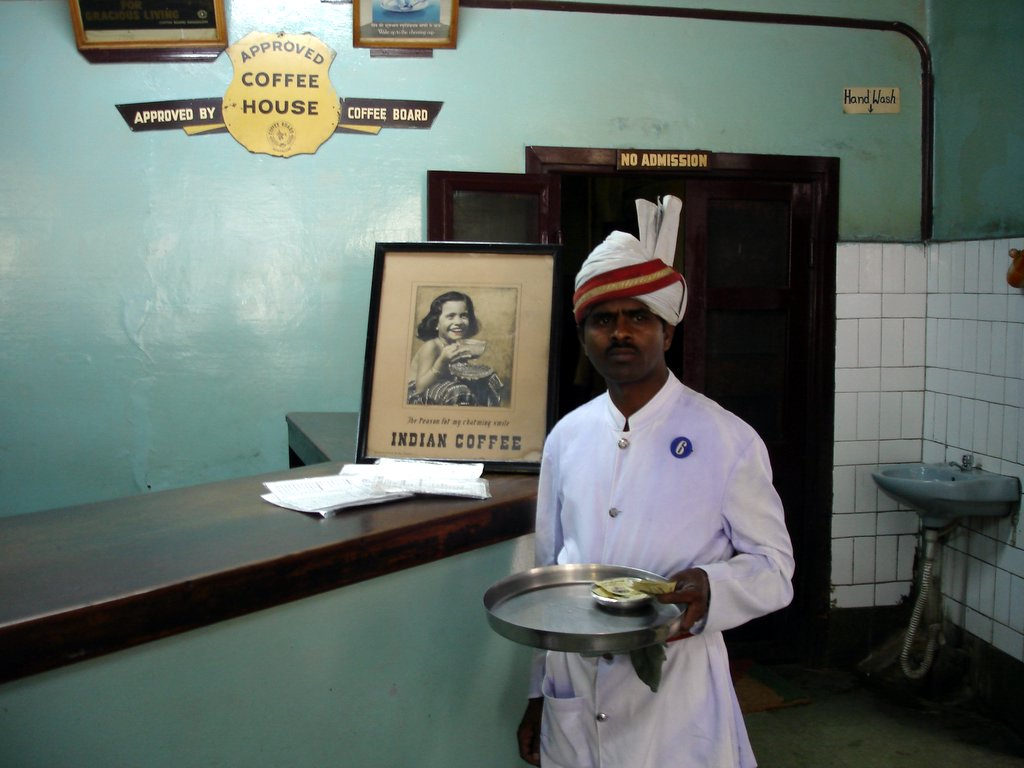
Waiter with turban in Indian Coffee House, Bangalore

The 50-year-old Indian Coffee House at M. G. Road in Bangalore closed on 5 April 2009, after the Indian Coffee Workers' Cooperative Society Limited lost a legal battle with the owner of the building to continue in the premises. It has been reopened on Church Street, less than a hundred metres away. Another is at Koramangala opposite to Jyoti Nivas College However, this belongs to the Jabalpur co-operative society. Four branches of Indian Coffee House are operating at Christ University's Main Campus on Hosur Road, Bannerghatta road and at Kengeri Campus.

=== Rajasthan ===
There are two branches in Jaipur: M.I. Road and Jawahar Kala Kendra.

=== Delhi ===
Delhi has three branches, namely in Kamla Nagar, Supreme court and Connaught Place.

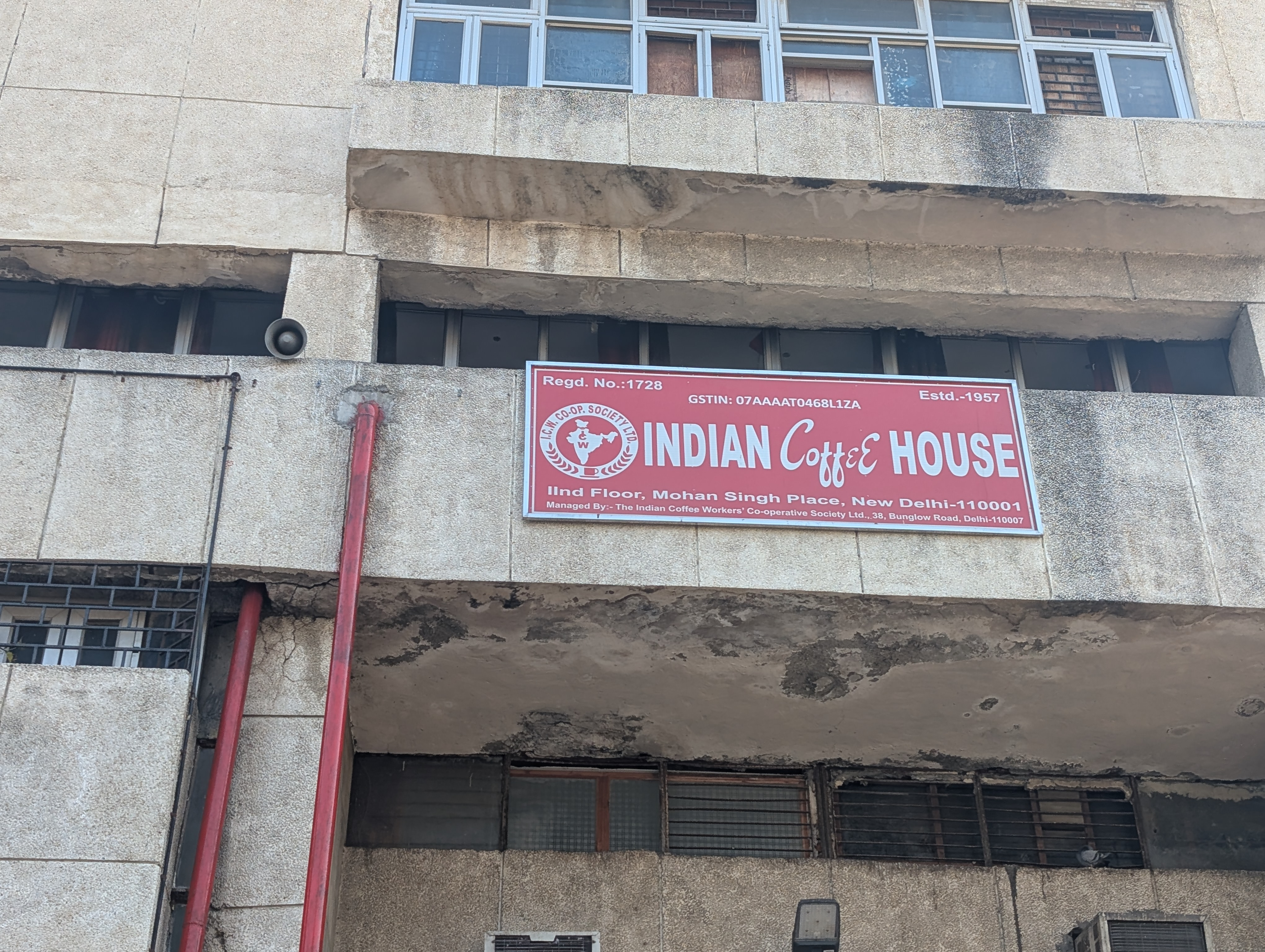
Indian Coffee House, Connaught Place

=== Pakistan ===
Pakistan also inherited Indian coffee houses post-partition with main branches in Karachi and Lahore that underwent change in ownership and were rebranded after independence in 1947. Other coffee houses were also established, notably Pioneer Coffee House in Karachi by Sheriff Merchant, a former member of the Indian Coffee Board who also served as the Manager of the Indian Coffee House in Karachi after the independence of Pakistan. Pak Tea House is a tea house and cafe in Lahore, Punjab, Pakistan that is known for its association with academics, writers, poets and intelligentsia.

== See also ==
- A. K. Gopalan
- List of coffeehouse chains
- Worker cooperative
