= College Street Coffee House =

Cafe in Kolkata, India

Indian Coffee House
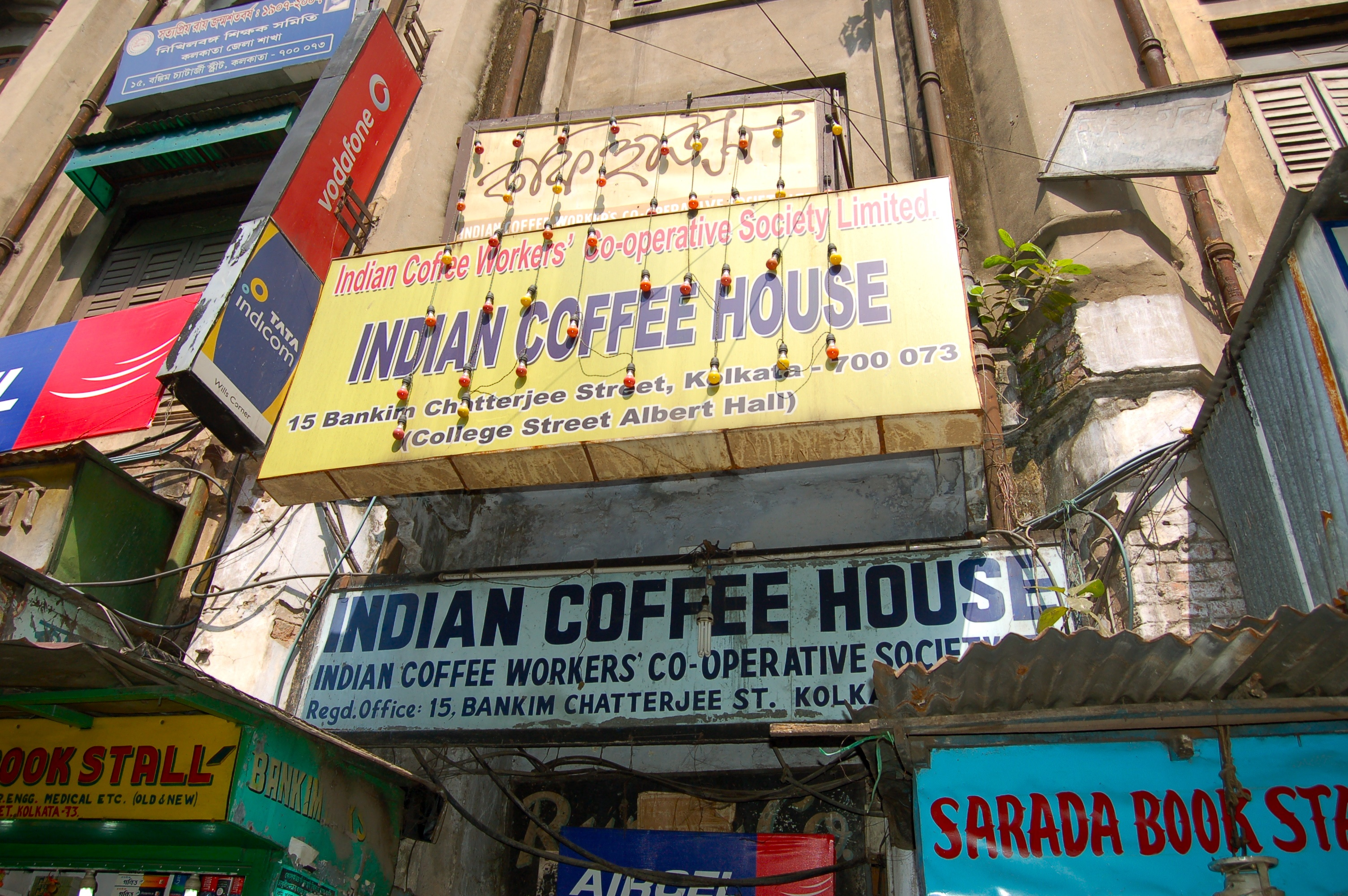
- Front gate
- Interactive map of Indian Coffee House

Restaurant information
- Established: April 1876; 150 years ago
- Location: Kolkata, West Bengal, India
- Coordinates: 22°34′34.14″N 88°21′42.47″E
- Website: indiancoffeehouse.in

College Street Coffee House or Indian Coffee House is a cafe located opposite the Presidency University and the Sanskrit College and University in College Street, the most famous of Indian Coffee House branches in Kolkata. It has been for a long time a regular hang out and a renowned meeting place (adda) for intellectuals and students (and ex-students) of the Presidency College, Sanskrit College, University of Calcutta, and other institutions in College Street. It has played an important part in Calcutta's (Kolkata) cultural history and known as the hub of intellectual debates.

== History ==
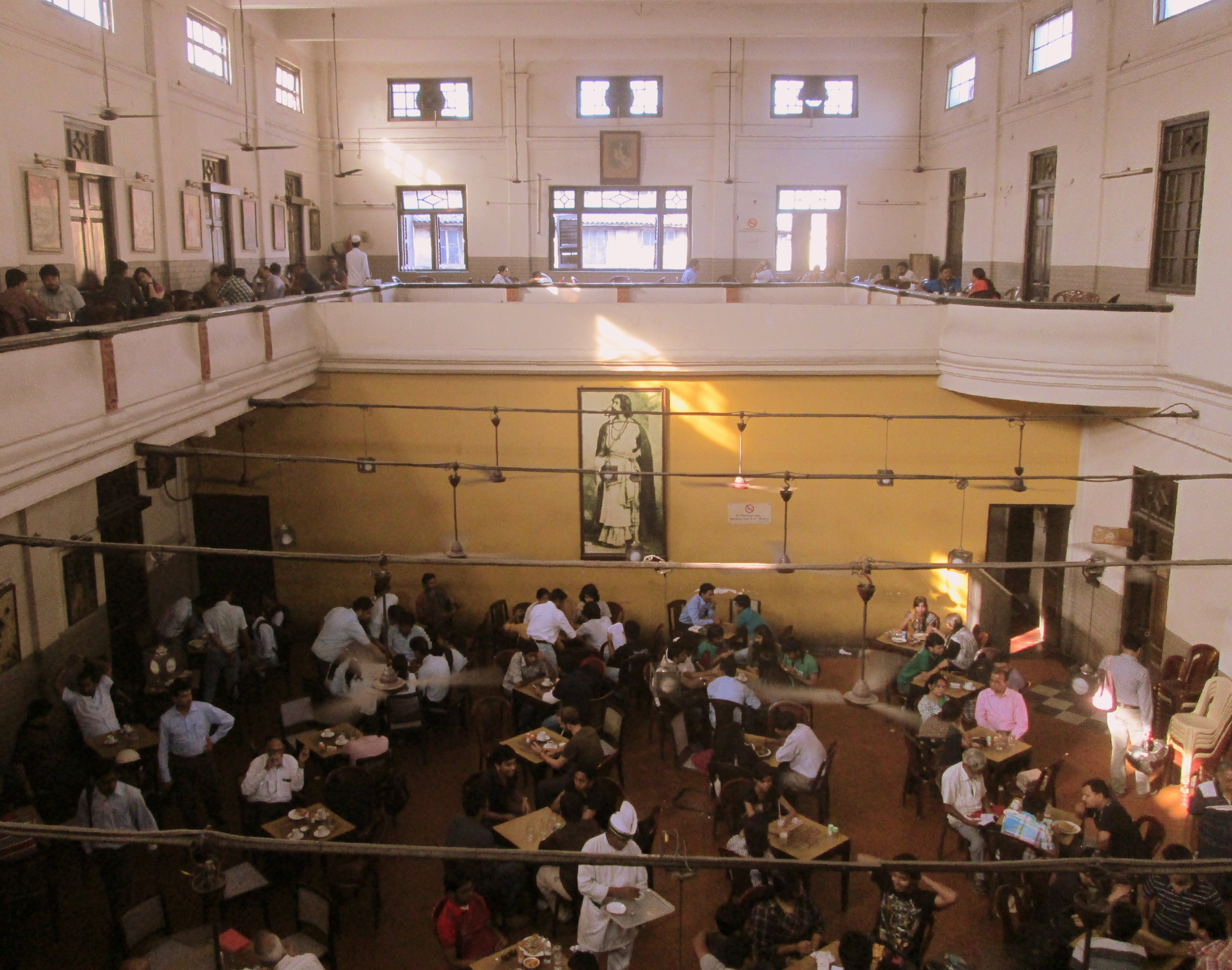
Interior of the College Street Coffee House, Kolkata.

The history of the Coffee House at College Street can be traced to Albert Hall, which was founded in April 1876. This Albert Hall was the primary residence of Ramkamal Sen, Treasurer of the Bank of Bengal and Secretary of the Asiatic Society, Calcutta, in the early 19th century.

Later, the Coffee Board decided to start a coffee joint from the Albert Hall in 1942. Notable citizens were frequent visitors to the place. In 1947, the Central Government changed the name of the place to "Coffee House". The place became a meeting place for the poets, artistes, literati and people from the world of art and culture. In 1958, the management decided to shut down the Coffee House, but it was re-opened the same year, after professors of Presidency College and Calcutta University rushed off a special petition to the government, to save the heritage place. In 2006, a huge financial crunch kept the co-operative society from undertaking renovation of the coffee house. Though a few companies such as Asian Paints approached the society with offers to renovate the restaurant, the offers were refused due to clash of norms and conditions.

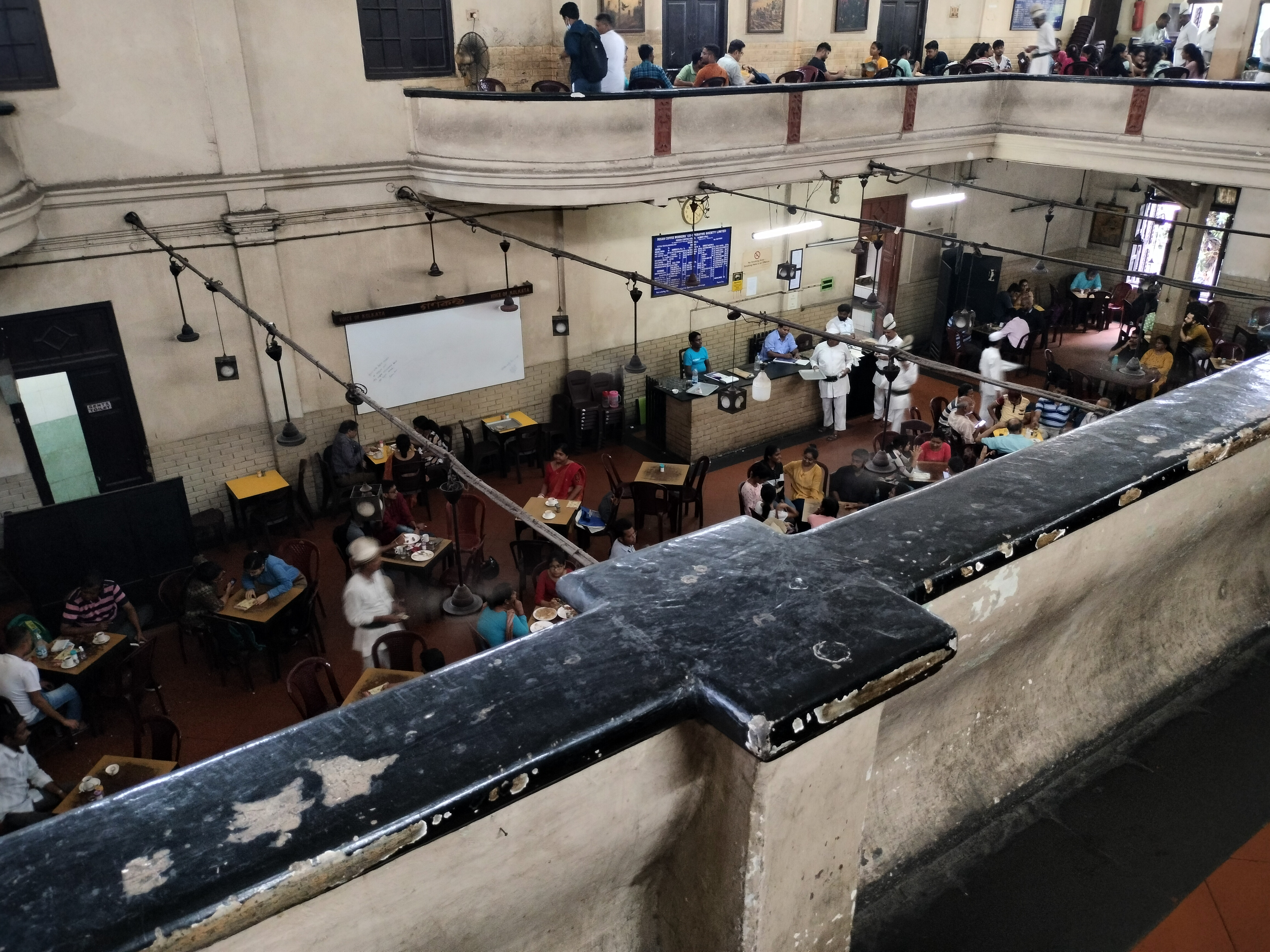
Inside view of the College Street Coffee House on a busy Saturday, September 2022.

During the 2020 Covid-19 pandemic, the house was closed for 103 days and resumed its normal operation on 2 July 2020.

== Famous patrons ==
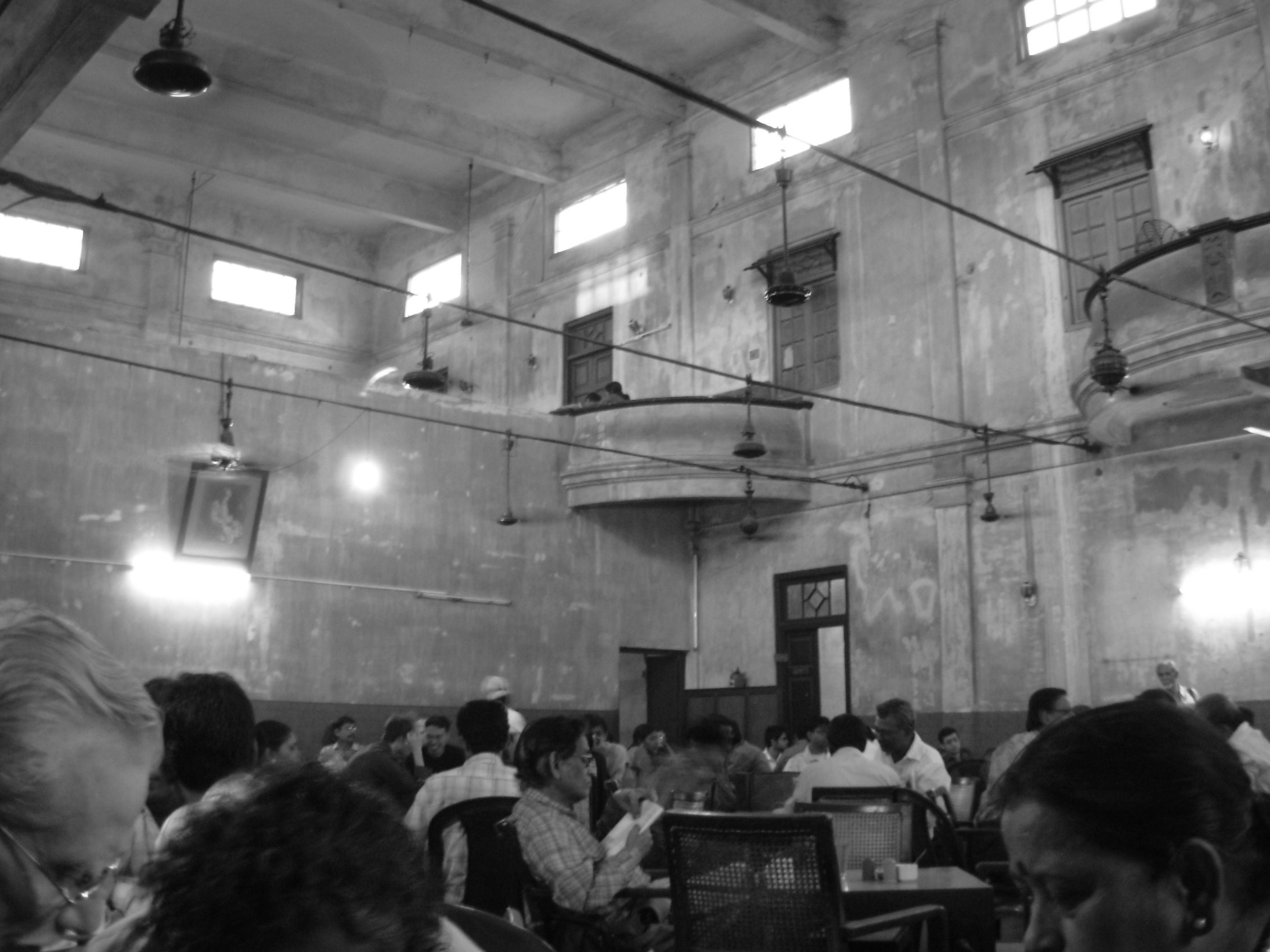
Indian Coffee House, Kolkata

The prestige of the Coffee House increased with regular visitors such as Satyajit Ray, Amartya Sen, Mrinal Sen and Aparna Sen. The Coffee House is of historical significance for being the rendezvous of innumerable versatile people, from its inception to date. Scholars, editors, artists and writers like Ritwik Ghatak, Narayan Gangopadhyay, Sunil Gangopadhyay, Sanjeev Chattopadhyay, Samaresh Majumdar, Subhas Mukhopadhyay, Shakti Chattopadhyay, Craig Jamieson, Sukhamoy Chakraborty, Tapan Raychaudhuri, Barun De and Sumit Sarkar . have been just a few among the patrons of the restaurant. In the early 1960s the coffee house became the intellectual battleground of the famous Hungry generation literary and cultural movement; the iconic poets Malay Roy Choudhury, Samir Roychoudhury brother duo who pioneered the movement were arrested and prosecuted. Several literary magazines owe their origin to the inspiration from the adda sessions at this coffee house. Though popularly known as College Street Coffee House, this branch is actually on Bankim Chatterjee Street. The coffee house is famous for its adda sessions, and as the breeding place of several political and cultural personalities and movements. Many people come here just for the sake of adda and just being a part of the long talking sessions. Several talented and illustrious persons from different streams have been thronging this renowned adda for a long time.

== In popular culture ==
The Coffee House has been memorialized in a famous song sung by Manna Dey titled Coffee House'er shei adda'ta aaj aar nei (That Coffee House adda is long gone now). Nachiketa Chakraborty's popular song 'Cofee House' 'Aj bochor dosh por dirghoswas kore bhor' was also inspired by the Coffee House. Films like Detective Byomkesh Bakshy have been shot here.
