= Shey Amar Choto Bon =

1978 song by Manna Dey

"Se Amar Chhoto Bon"

Song by Manna Dey
- Language: Bengali
- English title: She Is My Younger Sister
- Released: 1978
- Genre: Ballad
- Length: 6:40
- Label: Saregama
- Composer: Suparna Kanti Ghosh
- Lyricist: Pulak Bandyopadhyay
- Producer: Y. S. Mulkey

"Shey Amar Choto Bon" (officially "Se Amar Chhoto Bon") is a Bengali-language ballad by the Indian playback singer Manna Dey. It was written by Pulak Bandyopadhyay and composed by Suparna Kanti Ghosh in 1978. The song is regarded as popular composition and hit song in the Bengali language.

Also known by its lyrics "Boro Adorer Choto Bon," the song is played on Rakhi Bandhan and is considered a timeless song for the festival. The song focuses on the love of a brother and sister. Dey remarks that Rakhi can be celebrated through music and love.

"Shey Amar Choto Bon" was the debut song of composer Suparna Kanti Ghosh, as the first song composed by him and sung by Dey. Through his debut with this song, he got Dey to sing his next composed song "Coffee Houser Sei Addata," with lyrics by the lyricist Gauriprasanna Mazumdar.

== Composition ==
Suparna Kanti Ghosh's father Nachiketa Ghosh died in 1976. He started playing the harmonium and made music of songs written by lyricists Pulak Bandyopadhyay and Gauriprasanna Mazumdar, which Nachiketa Ghosh rejected.

Suparna Kanti Ghosh then lived in Hazra, Kolkata. One day, he was approached by Ajoy Biswas, an event host and film director. He asked Ghosh to play for him. Later, he met Manna Dey on an airplane to Bombay, where he promptly told him about Ghosh. The year was 1977 or 1978. After he returned to Kolkata, Manna Dey called him and asked Ghosh to visit his place in Hedua, Kolkata. In the morning, Ghosh went to Hedua where Dey asked him to sing his own composed song. After listening, Dey went upstairs and came down with an envelope, saying it was a song "penned by Pulak [Bandyopadhyay]." He said that it was quite long and he composed the tune with two other musicians. Manna Dey expressed that he was not getting the emotions right even after being composed by others. Later, Ghosh boarded a double decker 2B bus and saw the song written inside the envelope.

Within two or three days, he had composed the whole song. Ghosh commented that he was careful in composing the song so that Dey would not criticize his music. Dey had come back from Bombay and called him for the song. While singing the song, Dey cried many times and had to retake the song. In the final take, he controlled himself from crying and the song was recorded. When the song was taken, he told Ghosh, "You will go very far, but don't be foulmouthed like your father." He gave Ghosh a samosa to eat. Pulak Bandyopadhyay remarked that he did a good job on the long song and this was going to be Pujor gaan (Song for Puja).
