= Memories Come Alive =

2007 autobiography by Manna Dey

- Author: Manna Dey
- Original title: Jibaner Jalsaghare
- Translator: Sarbani Putatunda
- Language: English
- Subject: Manna Dey
- Genre: Autobiography
- Publisher: Penguin Books
- Publication date: 2007
- Publication place: India
- Pages: 432
- ISBN: 978-0-143-10193-2

Memories Come Alive: An Autobiography is a 2007 autobiography book by Indian playback singer and musician Manna Dey. Originally published in Bengali language in 2005 as Jibaner Jalsaghare, it was translated into English by Sarbani Putatunda and published by Penguin Books in 2007. This edition was also subsequently published in Hindi as Yaden Jee Uthi, and also in Marathi language. It includes Dey writing about various parts of his career, and giving tributes to musicians who influenced, collaborated or worked with him.

The book was released in 2007, with its price set at ₹450 and is about 432 pages in length. Dey's writings convey his career, biographical details, and works with other musicians, which are mentioned by many different sources about him. Jibaner Jalsaghare was released in January 2005 and published by Ananda Publishers, with Goutam Ray being the transcriber and editor, written in a colloquial style. Both books were featured in reviews. The Bengali version was presented at a function in Toronto.

== Statements ==
Manna Dey made and wrote many varied statements in Memories Come Alive which are mentioned by various articles and sources.

Dey mentioned in his book that he was approached by singer Lata Mangeshkar after singing his song "Kasme Wade Pyar Wafa" from the 1967 film Upkar, who asked him on suggestions on how Dey sang it with his realistic emotions and style. He also writes about the playback singer Mohammad Rafi, stating that he felt "jealous and envious" when he was asked by his associates to bring Rafi for recording a song. Dey says that he "could not understand" why he was overlooked, but later remarks on acknowledging that Rafi was better for that composition.

Dey wrote about his early life: "My only ambition now was to win the finals and be acclaimed as India's best wrestler ... Shunning the call of music all through my childhood and adolescence, I had aspired to be a champion wrestler...", indicating his early life's occupation as an accomplished wrestler taking training from professionals while studying at the Vidyasagar College in Kolkata.

A frequent collaborator with the composer duo Shankar–Jaikishan, he writes in Memories Come Alive that in their songs, he found their novelty to be most interesting feature. However, Dey remarks that he did not feel the same way for music director Sachin Dev Burman, who asked him to sing in the style of Dey's uncle Krishna Chandra Dey for the song "Upar Gagan Vishal", for the 1950 movie Mashaal, directed by Nitin Bose; further saying that Burman did not ask Dey to sing regularly in his own voice.

== Reviews ==
The book was first published in English under the name Memories Come Alive: An Autobiography. It was priced at ₹450 (equivalent to ₹1,500 or US$16 in 2026) with 432 pages. A reporter from Business Standard stated that in the book, Dey took a nostalgic trip down memory lane, including writings about his passions for football and wrestling, pranks he did as an adolescent such as shoplifting sweets from a confectionary and pole-vaulting into a neighbors' backyard, and the influence and works of his uncle K. C. Dey. The reporter further adds, "He recounts his early days in Mumbai as an assistant music director to his uncle and to composers like S D Burman and vividly recalls the struggle to carve a niche as a playback singer in Hindi films, competing with stalwarts like Rafi, Mukesh and Kishore Kumar."

In Memories Come Alive, Dey recollects his life starting from his family life in North Kolkata, to Bombay, where he often went for recording his songs in his professional career. Pankaj Vohra in an article of Hindustan Times writes, "The book is a ready reckoner of the success story of this great singer who acknowledges the role played in his life by various people starting from his mother to his favourite 'Babu Kaka' to his wife and hosts of great composers, singers and lyricists." Vohra acknowledges all six chapters of the book to make for a good reading, stating that the parts where Dey acknowledges the influence and inspiration from other singers to be captivating, calling the book as a "must read for music lovers". A limited edition of the book offered a free CD with Dey's songs.

In a review of the book in the journal The Book Review, Asad ur Rahman Kidwai remarks that memoirs of a "distinguished artiste" like Manna Dey are a significant addition to the history of the music of this stream, as also presenting anecdotal information. He states in his review, "The importance of this book is also underlined by the fact that though Hindi Film Music is unarguably one of the most popular components of our popular culture, strangely and sadly there is a paucity of serious literature in this genre."

Shubha Mudgal writing for Mint comments that the English book translation by Sarbani Putatunda enables those who do not know Bengali to know more about Dey's career and more of his popular hit songs. Mudgal further adds that for music lovers and fans of Dey, Memories Come Alive has a lot to offer from Dey's vast career and "experience as a playback singer, composer, assistant music director and scorer for films". Mudgal observes more about the book, stating that "it is the author’s disarming honesty that makes the book special for me", later adding an example for it, "Take, for instance, his account of his uncle Krishna Chandra Dey’s high standards of professionalism, which he refused to compromise for the sake of his talented nephew."

== Jibaner Jalsaghare ==
Jibaner Jalsaghare
- Editor: Goutam Ray
- Author: Manna Dey
- Language: Bengali
- Genre: Autobiography
- Publisher: Ananda Publishers
- Publication date: January 3, 2005
- Publication place: Kolkata
- English publication date: 2007
- Pages: 367
- ISBN: 81-7756-441-2

Manna Dey wrote his autobiography and published it originally in 2005 as Jibaner Jalsaghare, with Ananda Publishers in Bengali language. It was transcribed and edited by Dr. Goutam Ray. Later, it was dubbed in other languages. A documentary film was made about this book, with a few scenes that were shot in the College Street Coffee House, for its relevance to Dey's song "Coffee Houser Sei Addata". The documentary was released in 2008.

Jibaner Jalsaghare was released on January 3, 2005 by Ananda Publishers, with its first release taking place in an Oxford Bookstore on Park Street in Kolkata. The Telegraph described the book as: "A documentation of the gradual evolution of a great singer, the book traces the musical career of Dey in vivid detail. With a rich musical heritage as the nephew of the legendary K.C. Dey, his initiation into the world of music was by natural choice". It included Dey's life stories, containing his biographical details such as his rise to fame as a singer in Bombay while studying in college, his career and songs as a playback singer, Dey's associations with other contemporary music directors and composers such as S. D. Burman, Shankar–Jaikishan, Salil Chowdhury, K. C. Dey and others. Dey also wrote about his genres like Hindustani classical music, fusions and his works and career in primarily Hindi and Bengali songs.

The transcription given by Goutam Ray according to Shikha Akhtari Ahmad of Prothom Alo, portrays a sense of colloquialism, and does not always maintain the same continuity in the pace, character and time. Ahmad also writes that the book portrays Dey as a "somewhat self-absorbed artist". At the end of Jibaner Jalsaghare, there is a list of thousands of songs performed by Dey in an appendix format, having mostly his Bengali and Hindi film and non-film songs. In 2019, the fifteen edition of "Pathshala", a literary and art platform based in Toronto, featured Jibaner Jalsaghare, on occasion of the birth centennial of Dey, who died in 2013. The event took place on October 17 in Toronto Public Library in Eglinton Square branch, with Ikhtiar Omar giving statements about it.
