= Craig Jamieson =

British academic

- Born: Toronto, Ontario, Canada
- Education: Lampeter (BA); University of Cambridge (MA); University of London (MPhil)
- Known for: Buddhist scholarship
- Scientific career
- Fields: Buddhism, Sanskrit, Tibetan
- Workplaces: University of Cambridge; University of Leicester
- Website: www.lib.cam.ac.uk/collections/departments/south-asian-tibetan-and-southeast-asian-department

Craig Jamieson is Keeper of Sanskrit Manuscripts at the University of Cambridge.

Before Cambridge he taught Buddhism in the Study of Religion Department at the University of Leicester.

His best-known works are Perfection of Wisdom (ISBN 0-670-88934-2), which has a preface by the Dalai Lama, and Nagarjuna's Verses (ISBN 81-246-0175-5). A facsimile edition of the Lotus Sutra made available in print two Cambridge palm leaf manuscripts, Add. 1682 and Add. 1683, dating from approximately one thousand years ago.

A major exhibition took place in 2014 entitled Buddha's Word: The Life of Books in Tibet and Beyond. A short video of the Perfection of Wisdom manuscript came out in 2017.

In 2022 he was included as one of the 200 most notable people in the 200-year history of the University of Wales, Lampeter.
