= Adda (South Asian) =

Concept in South Asia, especially Bengal, conversation among a group of people

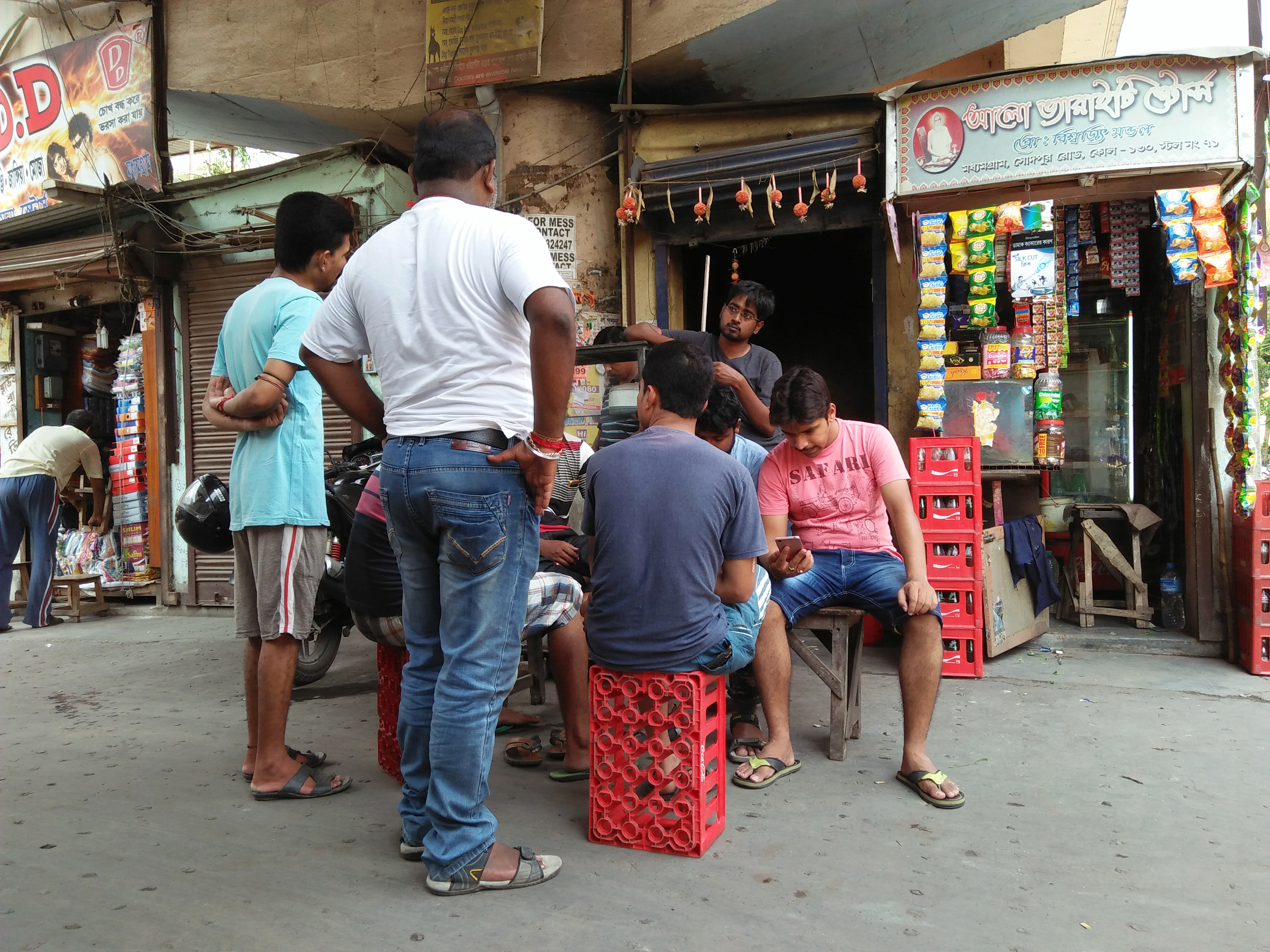
Adda conversation, Kolkata

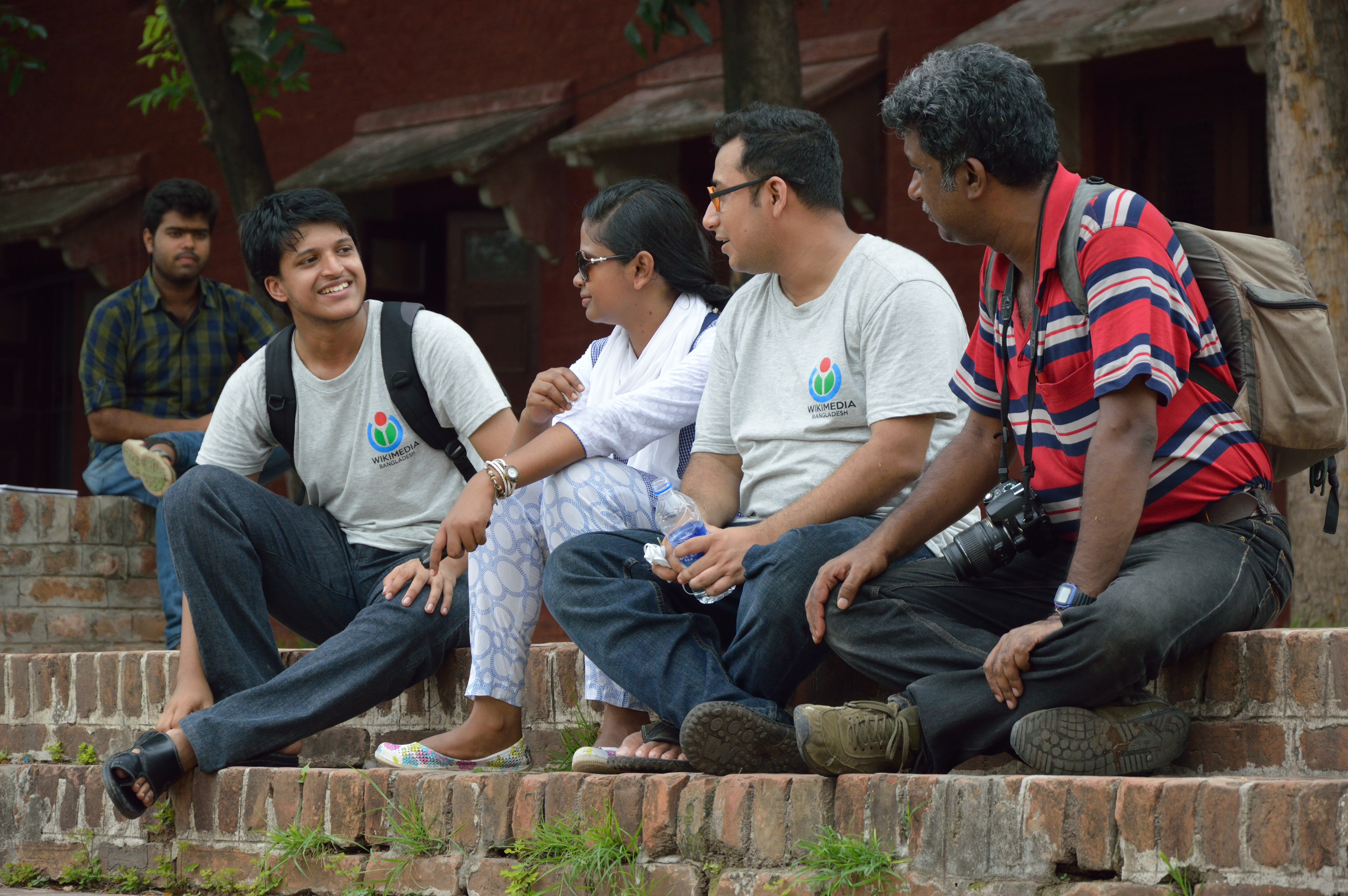
Adda of students in university campus, University of Dhaka

An adda (Bengali: আড্ডা) is a term in Bengali referring to when several individuals hang out (informally socialise) typically in neighbourhoods, homes, tea stalls, clubs, parks, and other public or private spaces. This originally took place between members of the same socio-economic strata, but the process has become more heterogeneous in modern times.

Adda was incorporated into the Oxford English Dictionary in 2004.

This word is both a standalone noun and a noun in a noun-verb compound, in Bengali. The nominalization of the word has two senses — one being the Hindi sense, and the other being the place of ritual meeting and/or conversation of a group of people (i.e., a symposium). The verb form means informal conversation among a group of people, often for hours on end, and usually accompanied by food.

== Other languages ==
=== Hindi ===
In Hindi, adda is a noun, with the nominal form of the word meaning the location or nest of a group or community. The etymology can be traced to the original meaning of the word, which means the "perching spot or perch for birds".

== Popular culture ==
College Street Coffee House became inseparable from the concept of adda in popular memory through Manna Dey's song "Coffee Houser Sei Addata" (1983).

In 2011, filmmakers Surjo Deb and Ranjan Palit made a documentary on the subject. The film, Adda: Calcutta, Kolkata, has been screened at several festivals around the globe and won the Golden Palm Award at the Mexico International Film Festival 2012.
