= Waliur Rahman Reza =

Bangladeshi politician

- ওয়ালিউর রহমান রেজা

Personal details
- Died: 9 May 2020 (aged 85) Gaibandha, Bangladesh
- Political party: Awami League

Waliur Rahman (died on 9 May 2020) was an Awami League politician and a member of parliament. He represented Gaibandha.

== Career ==
Rahman entered politics as a student and was elected VP of Carmichael College Students Union in 1958. He was elected as a commissioner of Gaibandha municipality in 1962. Rahman was elected to parliament from Rangpur-20 as an Awami League candidate in 1973.

== Death ==
Rahman died on 9 May 2020 at his home in Gaibandha following cardiac arrest.
