= Dhaka Mail =

Bangladeshi Online News Portal

- New Generation Online
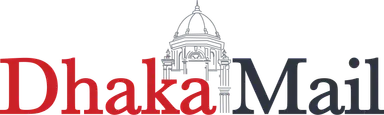
- Type: Online Newspaper
- Owner: US-Bangla Group
- Publisher: Dilruba Parvin
- Editor: Nazrul Islam (Acting)
- Founded: 15 December 2021; 4 years ago
- Language: Bengali
- Headquarters: 95 Suhrawardy Avenue Baridhara Diplomatic Zone
- City: Dhaka 1212
- Country: Bangladesh
- Website: www.dhakamail.com

Dhaka Mail (Bengali: ঢাকা মেইল) is a Bengali language online news portal in the Bangladesh. This news portal officially launched on 15 December 2021. But it began full operations on 1 March 2022.

== History ==
Dhaka Mail is operated by Bijoy Bangla Media Limited, owned by the US Bangla Group. It officially launched on 15 December 2021 with the slogan `New Generation Online'. Dilruba Parveen, DMD of US Bangla Group, is the publisher of Dhaka Mail. Acting Editor Najrul Islam, and Harun Jamil is serving as Executive Editor.

It was included in the registration list of the Ministry of Information on 31 October 2024, in accordance with the National Online Media Policy.

On 20 March 2025, Dhaka Mail's multimedia reporters Md. Elias and Shariful Islam came under attack while covering a news story related to BRTC's preparations for Eid-ul-Fitr. They were assaulted in front of Omar Faruk Mehedi, the Manager (Operations) of BRTC's Motijheel depot. In protest of the incident, the Multimedia Reporters Association (MRA) held a human chain on 24 March 2025.

== News departments ==
Dhaka Mail regularly publishes news on national, political, economic, national, international, sports, entertainment, health, education, information technology, cockpit, jobs and other topics.

== Employees ==
There are 37 people working at the head office of Dhaka Mail.

Dhaka Mail's Head of News Harun Jamil has been elected as the President of the Parliamentary Journalists Association for the 2025-26 term.

Dhaka Mail's staff correspondent Kazi Rafiq died of a heart attack on 27 December 2024, at the age of 29.

== Award and Recognition ==
On 17 December 2023, Dhaka Mail’s senior reporter Mostofa Imrul Kayes received the ‘BRAC Migration Award’ for his investigative journalism in the migration sector.

Dhaka Mail’s news editor and writer Zahir Uddin Babor was awarded the ‘Nakib Padak’ on 20 November 2024.

On 14 March 2025, Dhaka Mail’s senior sub-editor Nisheta Mitu received the ‘Pop of Color Limited Ononnya Sommanona 2025’.

== See also ==
- BBC Bangla
- The Daily Star (Bangladesh)
- Bangla Tribune
- Somoy TV
