= Manna Dey =

Indian singer (1919–2013)

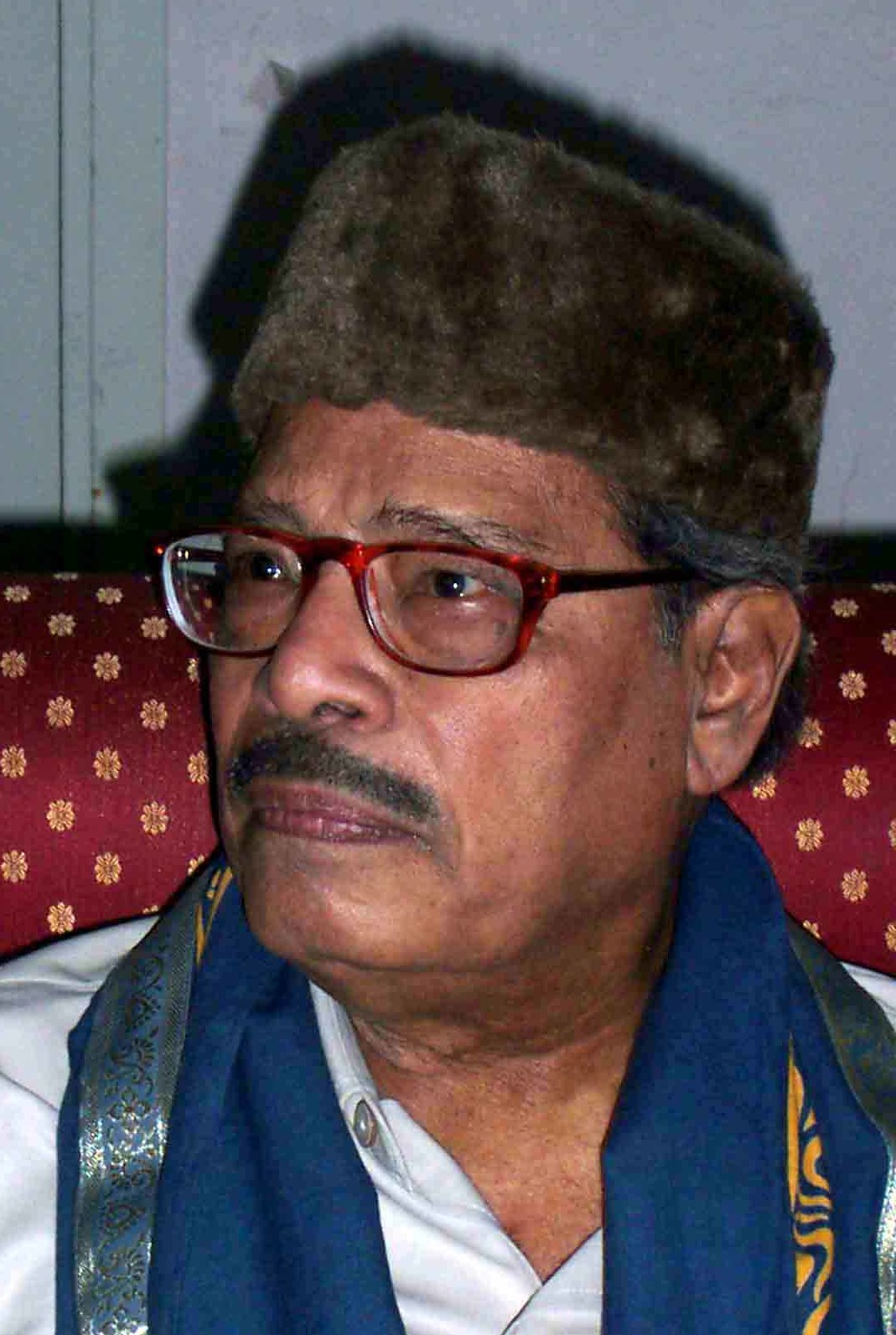
- Born: Prabodh Chandra Dey; 1 May 1919; Calcutta, Bengal Presidency, British India (present-day Kolkata, West Bengal, India)
- Died: 24 October 2013 (aged 94); Bangalore, Karnataka, India
- Other name: Manna Dey
- Education: Vidyasagar College; University of Calcutta
- Occupations: Singer; Playback singer; Music director; Musician
- Spouse: Sulochana Kumaran
- Relatives: Krishna Chandra Dey (uncle)
- Musical career
- Genres: Filmi; Classical; Qawwali; Ghazals; Bhajans; Gurbani; Nazrul Geeti; Rock and roll
- Instruments: Vocals; Harmonium; Tabla; Sitar; Tanpura
- Years active: 1938–2013
- Website: www.mannadey.in

"Emon Bondhu Aar Ke Aache"
"Emon Bondhu Aar Ke Aache" song in Deep Jwele Jai sung by Manna Dey in 1959.

Prabodh Chandra Dey (/ˈmænə ˈdeɪ/; 1 May 1919 − 24 October 2013), known professionally as Manna Dey, was an Indian playback singer, music director, and musician. With a strong foundation in classical music, he is widely regarded as one of the most versatile and celebrated vocalists in the Indian film industry. He is also credited with bringing Indian classical music into mainstream Hindi cinema.

Dey was especially acclaimed for blending classical music elements with popular compositions, a style that played a significant role during the golden era of Hindi cinema.

Over a career spanning more than five decades, Dey recorded about 3,500 songs. While most were in Bengali and Hindi, he also sang in 14 other Indian languages, including Bhojpuri, Punjabi, Assamese, Gujarati, Kannada, Malayalam, and Chhattisgarhi. His peak popularity was during the mid-1950s to the 1970s.

For his contribution to Indian music, Dey received numerous honours. He was awarded the Padma Shri in 1971, the Padma Bhushan in 2005, and the Dadasaheb Phalke Award in 2007. He belonged to the Bhendibazaar gharana and trained under Ustad Aman Ali Khan.

== Early life ==
Dey was born in a Bengali family to Mahamaya and Purna Chandra Dey on 1 May 1919 in Calcutta (Now Kolkata). Besides his parents, his youngest paternal uncle, Sangeetacharya Krishna Chandra Dey highly inspired and influenced him. He received his early education at Indu Babur Pathshala, a small pre-primary school. He started doing stage shows in school from 1929. He attended Scottish Church Collegiate School and Scottish Church College. He participated in sports events like wrestling and boxing in his college days, taking training from Gobar Guha. He graduated from Vidyasagar College.

Dey began taking music lessons from Krishna Chandra Dey and Ustad Dabir Khan. During this period of learning, he stood first for three consecutive years in three different categories of inter-collegiate singing competitions.

== Career ==
=== Early career (1942–1953) ===
Before singing his first film score, Manna Dey's uncle Krishna Chandra Dey suggested him to take the stage name "Manna Dey." K. C. Dey was a music director. Manna Dey was influenced by music from his early years.

Dey started his career in playback singing with the movie Tamanna, in 1942. The musical score was by Krishna Chandra Dey and Manna sang a duet named "Jago Aayee Usha Ponchi Boley Jago" with Suraiya which was an instant hit.

Shankar Rao Vyas taught Manna Dey the songs and he chose to sing them in his uncle's distinct style. And thus started the illustrious career with his first solo song "Gayi Tu Gayi Seeta Sati" from the film Ram Rajya in 1943. The song remarked then Dey as a singer of devotional songs, and got the attention of music composers. The song was the only film song that Mahatma Gandhi heard.

Dey also composed music for a few films, including Chamkee (1952), Tamasha (1952), Naina (1953), Jai Mahadev (1955), Gauri Pooja (1956) and Naag Champa (1958).

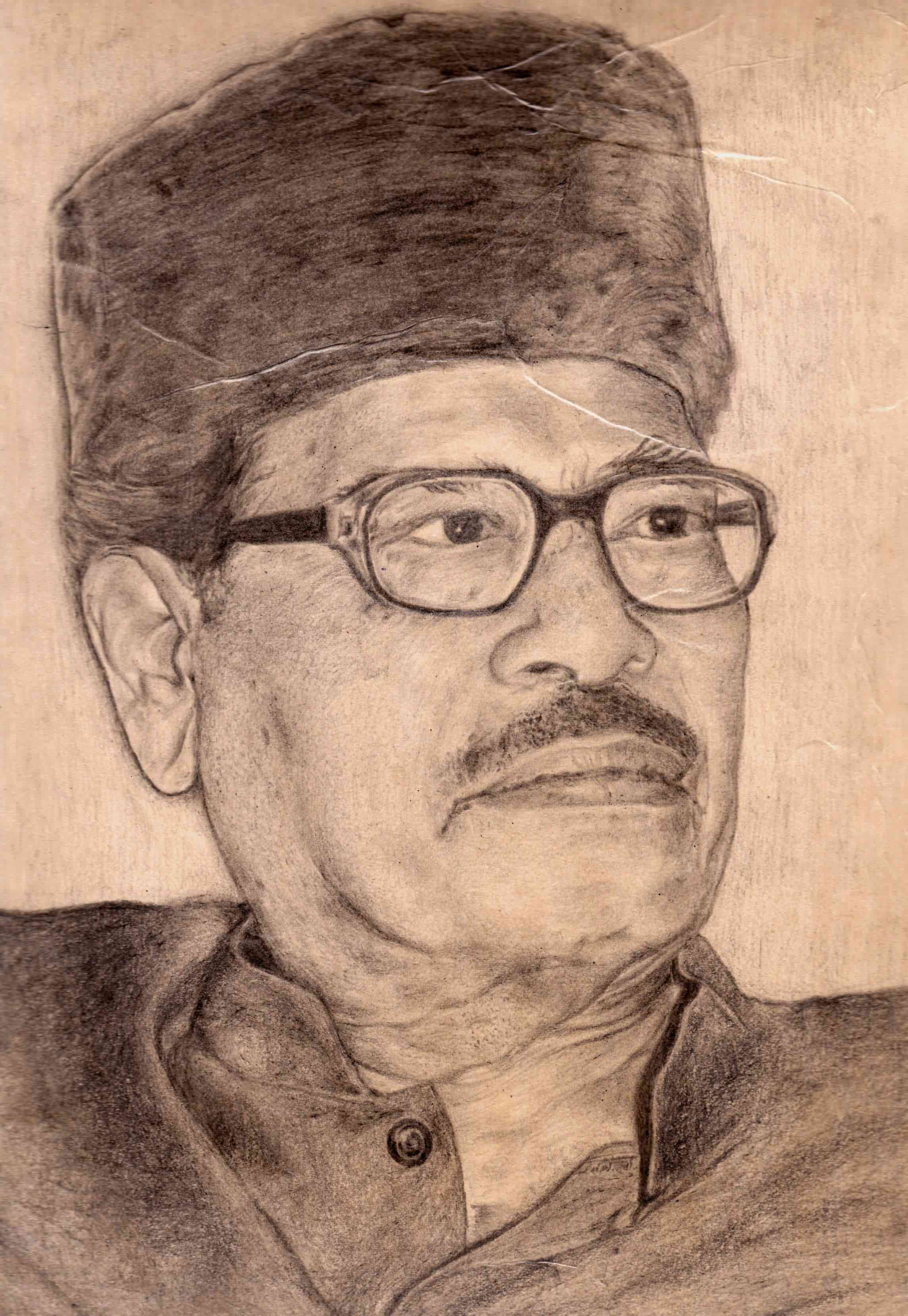
Dey after Getting D.Litt degree from Rabindra Bharati University (May 2004)

=== 1968–1991 ===
He received a fresh lease of life in his playback singing career from 1971 after Rajesh Khanna allowed music directors to picturise or feature songs sung by Dey in films with Khanna in lead role beginning with Anand, composed by Salil Chowdhury. For Rajesh Khanna, Dey had sung songs "Zindagi kaisi hai paheli" (Anand, 1971), "Tum bin jeewan kaisa jeewan" and "Bhor Aaye Gaya Andhera" (Bawarchi, 1972), "Nadiya Chale Re" (song sung with Rajesh and Dey), "Hasne ki chah ne kitna mujhe" (Avishkaar, 1973) and "Gori tori paijaniya" (Mehbooba, 1976). Later in a 2012 interview, Dey said, "I loved the way he picturised music. The success of a song depends upon how an actor picturises it. He was the number one in picturising songs. I will be ever indebted to him."

In 1983, Manna Dey sang the Bengali song "Coffee Houser Sei Addata", penned by Gauriprasanna Mazumdar and composed by Suparna Kanti Ghosh in a studio in Mumbai.

His first duet with Usha Khanna was "Janemon Janemon Tum Din Raat" from film Haye Mera Dil (1968), composed by Kalyanji Anandji. His first song with S. Janaki was "Itna Manta Tu Mera" from Aashiq C.I.D (1973) and with P. Susheela was "Joy Ho Gaanga Maiya Ki" from Gangaa Ki God Mein (1980). He recorded his first song with Vani Jayram, "Rataiya Baba, Rajania Baba" for the film Ratnaa Dakoo in 1972 and their other popular duets include "Mitwa More Man Mitwa" from the film Parinay (1974), composed by Jaidev. Dey also sang with singer/composer, Hemant Kumar (Hemanta Mukherjee), in Bengali movies, and also with some other Bengali composers like Nachiketa Ghosh and Sudhin Dasgupta. He sang a duet, "Ke Prothom Kachhe Esechi", with Lata Mangeshkar in the movie Sankhyabela. He also performed Rabindra Sangeet and recorded over 4000 songs till 2012. In addition to film songs, Dey released several albums of devotional songs of Jagadguru Shree Kripaluji Maharaj.

=== 1992–2013 ===
He sang duets with singers like Kishore Kumar, Md Rafi, Mukesh, Sandhya Mukherjee, Mahendra Kapoor, Talat Mahmood, Hemant Kumar, Amit Kumar, Shailendra Singh, Krishna Kalle, Shardha Rajan Iyengar, Arati Mukherjee, Chandrani Mukherjee, Anuradha Pudwal, Hemlata (singer), Minu Purushottom, Bhupinder Singh, K.J. Yesudas, P Jayachandran, Suresh Wadkar, Kavita Krishnamoorty, Alka Yagnik, Antara Chowdhury, Preeti Sagar, Dilraj Kaur, Yunus Fazmi, Jaspal Singh, Anwar, Manhar Udhas, Joginder and Mubarak Begum. He worked with more than 102 music directors in Hindi film industry from working with Krishna Chandra Dey in Tamanna in 1942 to music composer Shamir Tandon in 2006.

== List of movies where Manna Dey lent his voice ==
- Tamanna (1942)
- Ramrajya (1943)
- Jwar Bhata (1944)
- Kavita (1945)
- Mahakavi Kalidas (1944)
- Vikramaditya (1945)
- Prabhu Ka Ghar (1946)
- Valmiki (1946)
- Geetgobind (1947)
- Ham bhi Insaan Hai (1948)
- Rambaan (1948)
- Awaara (1951)
- Andolan (1951)
- Rajput (1951)
- Jeevan Nauka (1952)
- Qurbani (1952)
- Parineeta (1953)
- Chitrangada (1953)
- Do Bigha Zamin (1953)
- Mahatma (1953)
- Boot Polish (1954)
- Baadban (1954)
- Mahatma Kabir (1954)
- Ramayan (1954)
- Shree 420 (1955)
- Seema (1955)
- Devdas (1955)
- Jai Mahadev (1955)
- Jhanak Jhanak Payal Baje (1955)
- Kundan (1955)
- Ek Din Ratre(1956)
- Chori Chori (1956)
- Do Aankhen Barah Haath (1957)
- Amar Singh Rathaur (1957)
- Jai Ambe (1957)
- Janam Janam Ke Phere (1957)
- Johnny Walker (1957)
- Laal Batti (1957)
- Miss India (1957)
- Narshi Bhagat (1957)
- Naya Zamana (1957)
- Pardesi (1957)
- Parvarish (1958)
- Amardeep (1958)
- Post Box 999 (1958)
- Daak Harkara (1958)
- Anari (1959)
- Chacha Zindabad (1959)
- Deep Jwele Jaai (1959)
- Kavi Kalidas (1959)
- Navrang (1959)
- Gali Thekey Rajpath (1959)
- Ujala (1959)
- Madhu (1959)
- Manzil (1960)
- Angulimaal (1960)
- Anuradha (1960)
- Bombai Ka Babu (1960)
- Barsaat Ki Raat (1960)
- Bewaqoof (1960)
- Jis Desh Mein Ganga Behti Hai (1960)
- Kala Bazar (1960)
- Kalpana (1960)
- Ganga (1960 film)
- Shriman Satyawadi (1960)
- Zindagi Aur Khwab (1961)
- Kabuliwala (1961)
- Main Shadi Karne Chala (1962)
- Baat Ek Raat Ki (1962)
- Sakhi Robin (1962)
- Dil Hi To Hai (1963)
- Rustam Sohrab (1963)
- Ustadon Ke Ustad (1963 film)
- Jab Se Tumhe Dekha Hai (1963)
- "Suhagan (1964)
- Chitralekha (1964)
- Waqt (1965)
- Bhoot Bungla (1965)
- Love in Tokyo (1966)
- Teesri Kasam (1966)
- Pyar Kiye Ja (1966)
- Sankhyabela (1966)
- Subhash Chandra (1966)
- Pati Patni (1966)
- Upkaar (1967)
- Raat Aur Din (1967)
- Aamne Samne (1967)
- Palki (1967)
- Nawab Sirajdoula
- Boond Jo Ban Gayee Moti (1967)
- Antony Firingee (film) (1967)
- Duniya Nachegi (1967)
- Padosan (1968)
- Mere Huzoor (1968)
- Neel Kamal (1968)
- Ram Aur Rahim (1968)
- Baghini (1968 film)
- Chowringhee (1968)
- Ek Phool Do Mali (1969)
- Chanda Aur Bijli (1969)
- Chiradiner (1969)
- Jyoti (1969)
- Pratham Kadam Phool (1969)
- Teen Bhubaner Pare (1969)
- Pushpanjali (1970)
- Nishi Padma (1970)
- Mera Naam Joker (1970)
- Bilambita Loy (1970)
- Anand (1971)
- Johar Mehmood in Hong Kong (1971)
- Jane Anjane (1971)
- Lal Patthar (1971)
- Buddha Mil Gaya (1971)
- Chhadmabeshi (1971)
- Dhanyee Meye (1971)
- Anubhav (1972)
- Paraya Dhan (1971)
- Reshma Aur Shera (1971)
- Durbar Gati Padma (1971)
- Chemmeen (Malayalam)
- Alo Amar Alo (1972)
- Har Mana Har (1972)
- Picnic (1972 film)
- Stree (1972 film)
- Bawarchi (1972)
- Jeeban Rahasya (1972)
- Seeta Aur Geeta (1972)
- Shor (1972)
- Zindagi Zindagi (1972)
- Avishkaar (1973)
- Dil Ki Rahe (1973)
- Hindustan Ki Kasam (1973)
- Sampurna Ramayan (1973)
- Saudagar (1973)
- Zanjeer (1973)
- Bobby (1973)
- Basanta Bilap (1973)
- Marjina Abdulla (1973)
- Dukh Bhanjan Tera Naam (1974) punjabi movie
- Nellu (Malayalam) (1974)
- Resham ki Dori (1974)
- Us Paar (1974)
- Mouchak(1974)
- Fuleswari(1974)
- Sholay (1975)
- Himalay Se Ooncha (1975)
- Sanyasi (1975)
- Ponga Pandit (1975)
- Jai Santoshi Ma (1975)
- Deewaar (1975)
- Sanyasi Raja(1975)
- Selam Memsaheb Bengali (1975)
- Palanka (1975)
- Das Mnambati (1976)
- Mehbooba (1976)
- Harmonium (1976)
- Hotel Snow Fox (1976)
- Daku Rani Ganga (1976) (Gujarati)
- Anurodh (1977)
- Minoo (1977)
- Satyam Shivam Sundaram (1978)
- Jurmana (1978)
- Ganadevata (1978)
- Charmurti (1978)
- Dui Purush (1978 film)
- Gautam Govinda (1979)
- Devdas (1979 film)
- Heere Manik (1979)
- Abdullah (1980)
- Choron Ki Baaraat (1980)
- Kranti
- Karz (1980)
- Dadar Kirti (1980)
- Surya Sakkhi (1981)
- Laawaris (1981)
- Indira (1983)
- Lalan Fakir (1987)
- Agaman (1988)
- Prahaar (1990)
- Debata (1990)
- Guria (1997)
- Umar (2006)
- Sangat (unreleased)

== Manna Dey discography ==
| Year | Film | Song | Composer(s) | Writer(s) | Co-artist(s) |
|---|---|---|---|---|---|
| 1960 | Shriman Satyawadi | "Bheegi Hawaon Mein, Teri Adaon Mein" | Dattaram Wadkar | Gulzar | Suman Kalyanpur |
| 1961 | Zindagi Aur Khwab | "Na Jane Kaha Tum The" | Dattaram Wadkar | Kavi Pradeep | Suman Kalyanpur |
| 1962 | Sakhi Robin | "Tum Jo Aao To Pyar Aa Jaye" | Robin Banerjee | Yogesh | Suman Kalyanpur |
| 1962 | Neeli Aankhen | "Ye Nashili Hawa" | Dattaram Wadkar | Gulshan Bawra | Suman Kalyanpur |
| 1963 | Bidesiya | "Ishq Karaye O Jiski Jem Me" | S. N. Tripathi | Ram Moorti Chaturvedii | Mahendra Kapoor |
| 1963 | Bidesiya | "Hansi Hansi Panda Khiwanle" | S. N. Tripathi | Ram Moorti Chaturvedii | Mahendra Kapoor |
| 1963 | Bidesiya | "Jaan Like Hatheli Par" | S. N. Tripathi | Ram Moorti Chaturvedii | Geeta Dutt |
| 1963 | Laagi Naahi Chhute Rama | "Munhwase Bola Part1" | Chitragupt | Majrooh Sultanpuri | Asha Bhosle |
| 1963 | Laagi Naahi Chhute Rama | "Munhwase Bola Part1" | Chitragupt | Majrooh Sultanpuri | Asha Bhosle |
| 1963 | Jab Se Tumhe Dekha Hai | "Ye Din, Din Hai Khushi Ke" | Dattaram Wadkar | Shailendra | Suman Kalyanpur |
| 1965 | Ayeel Basant Bahar | Maiya Thumak Thumak" | Hemant Kumar | Rammoorti Chaturvedi | |
| 1965 | Ayeel Basant Bahar | "Phoolwa Ke Jhulwa" | Hemant Kumar | Rammoorti Chaturvedi | |
| 1965 | Ayeel Basant Bahar | "Ab To Chala Sambhal Ke Chacha" | Hemant Kumar | Rammoorti Chaturvedi | Mahendra Kapoor |
| 1965 | Ayeel Basant Bahar | "Tohre Naina Me Khoi Gaile" | Hemant Kumar | Rammoorti Chaturvedi | Geeta Dutt |
| 1977 | Dangal | "Kashi Hile Patna Hile Kalkatta Hilela | Nadeem–Shravan | Rajpati Rahi | Solo |
| 1980 | Jaagal Bhag Hamaar | Badlal Desava Ke Byavhaar | S. N. Tripathi | Rammoorti Chaturvedi | |
| 1980 | Jaagal Bhag Hamaar | Chaar Dina Kai Zindagani | S. N. Tripathi | Rammoorti Chaturvedi | |
| 1980 | Jaagal Bhag Hamaar | Baoor Ho Gaye Lee Gori | S. N. Tripathi | Rammoorti Chaturvedi | Asha Bhosle |

== Personal life ==
In December 1953, Dey married Sulochana Kumaran. She was originally from Kannur, Kerala. Together they had two daughters – Shuroma Herekar (1956–2016), a US based scientist and Shumita Dev (b. 1958), a Bengaluru-based businesswoman. Sulochana died in Bengaluru in January 2012. She had been suffering from cancer for some time. After her death, Dey moved to Kalyan Nagar in Bengaluru after spending more than fifty years in Mumbai.

== Death ==
On 8 June 2013, Dey was admitted to the ICU in a Bengaluru hospital after a chest infection gave rise to other complications. His health gradually improved and about a month later doctors took him off the ventilator support. Later, he was discharged from the hospital.

He was hospitalised again in the first week of October 2013, and died of a cardiac arrest at 3:45 pm on 24 October at Narayana Hrudayalaya hospital in Bengaluru, aged 94. Musicians, politicians, cricketers and other notable persons issued statements on his death. He was cremated in Bengaluru.

== Media ==
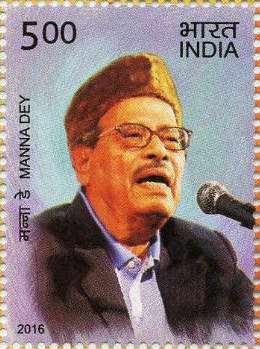
Manna Dey 2016 stamp

Dey's Bengali language autobiography, Jibaner Jalsaghare, has been published by Ananda Publishers in the year 2005 which has been translated in English as Memories Come Alive, in Hindi as Yaden Jee Uthi and in Marathi as Jivanacha Jalasagarat.

Jibaner Jalsaghore, a documentary on Dey's life, was released in 2008. Manna Dey Sangeet Academy is developing a complete archive on Manna Dey. In association with Rabindra Bharati University, Kolkata, the Manna Dey Music Archive has been developed in the Sangeet Bhawan.

He also lent his voice for Madhushala, composed by Harivansh Rai Bachchan.

== Awards ==
- 1965 Bengal Film Journalists' Association Award
- 1967 Bengal Film Journalists' Association Award – Best Male Playback Award for Sankhyabela
- 1968 Bengal Film Journalists' Association Award – Best Male Playback Award for Antony Firingi
- 1968 National Film Award for Best Male Playback Singer for the Hindi Film Mere Huzoor
- 1969 Bengal Film Journalists' Association Award – Best Male Playback Award (Hindi) for Mere Huzoor
- 1970 Bengal Film Journalists' Association Award – Best Male Playback Award for Chira Diner
- 1971 National Film Award for Best Male Playback Singer for the Bengali film Nishi Padma and Hindi film Mera Naam Joker
- 1971 Padma Shri by Government of India
- 1972 Filmfare Award for Best Male Playback Singer for Mera Naam Joker
- 1973 Bengal Film Journalists' Association Award – Best Male Playback Award for Stree
- 1979 Kalaimamani Award by the Government of Tamil Nadu, which is the highest state honour in the field of Arts
- 1983 Tulsi Samman by Government of Madhya Pradesh
- 1985 Ordre des Arts et des Lettres awarded by Government of France
- 1985 Lata Mangeshkar Award awarded by Government of Madhya Pradesh
- 1988 Bengal Film Journalists' Association Award – Best Male Playback Award for Lalan Fakir
- 1988 Michale Sahittyo Puraskar awarded by Renaissance Sanskritik Parishad, Dhaka
- 1990 Shyamal Mitra Award by Mithun Fans Association
- 1991 Sangeet Swarnachurr Award awarded by Shree Khetra Kala Prakashika, Puri
- 1993 P.C.Chandra Award by P.C.Chandra Group & others
- 1994 Fukuoka Prize by Government of Japan
- 1995 Kalidas Samman by Government of Madhya Pradesh
- 1999 Kamala Devi Roy Award by Kamala Devi Group
- 1999 Zee Cine Award for Lifetime Achievement by Zee Group
- 2001 Anandalok Lifetime Award by the Anandabazar Group
- 2002 Special Jury Swaralaya Yesudas Award for outstanding performance in music
- 2003 Alauddin Khan Award by the Government of West Bengal
- 2004 National Award as Playback singer by Government of Kerala
- 2004 Hony D. Litt. Award by the Rabindra Bharati University
- 2005 Lata Mangeshkar Award by Government of Maharashtra
- 2005 Padma Bhushan by the Government of India
- 2007 First Akshaya Mohanty Award by Government of Orissa
- 2007 Awarded the Dada Saheb Phalke Award by the Government of India
- 2008 Hony D. Litt. Award by Jadavpur University
- 2009 Mirchi Music Lifetime Achievement Award
- 2011 Filmfare Lifetime Achievement Award
- 2011 Banga-Vibhushan by Government of West Bengal
- 2012 Annanyo Samman given by 24 Ghanta TV channel for his lifetime achievement.
- 2013 Conferred with Sangeet Maha Samman by Government of West Bengal.
- 2013 Deshikottama by Visva-Bharati(posthumously).
- 2015 Honorary D.Litt. by University of Cambridge(posthumously).
