= Pratikaar =

1987 Indian Bengali vigilante action film by Prabhat Roy

- Directed by: Prabhat Roy
- Written by: Prabhat Roy
- Screenplay by: Prabhat Roy
- Produced by: Pranab Basu
- Starring: Victor Banerjee; Chiranjeet Chakraborty; Debashree Roy; Madhabi Chakraborty; Utpal Dutta; Satabdi Roy; Shakuntala Barua; Biplab Chatterjee; Sukhen Das; Chhaya Devi; Nimu Bhowmik
- Cinematography: Krishna Chakraborty
- Edited by: Pranab Ghosh; Rabin Sen
- Music by: Bappi Lahiri
- Production company: Chandima Films
- Distributed by: Chandima Films
- Release date: 17 April 1987
- Country: India
- Language: Bengali

Pratikaar (English: Prevention) is a 1987 Indian Bengali-language vigilante action film written and directed by Prabhat Roy. Produced by Pranab Basu under the banner of Chandima Films, the film stars Victor Banerjee, Chiranjeet Chakraborty, Debashree Roy, Utpal Dutta, Madhabi Mukherjee, Satabdi Roy, Shakuntala Barua, Sukhen Das, Biplab Chatterjee, Chhaya Devi and Nimu Bhowmik. The screenplay and dialogues were also written by Prabhat Roy. The soundtrack album and background score was composed by Bappi Lahiri, with the lyrics penned by Gauriprasanna Mazumder.

Pratikaar marks the second collaboration between Prabhat Roy and Victor Banerjee and the first collaboration between Roy and Chiranjeet Chakraborty. It was an all-time blockbuster at the box office and ran more than 42 weeks in theatres. It received a number of positive reviews from critics, with appreciation for its screenplay and direction, performances by the whole casting, stylized action sequences and the massy portrayal of the protagonist in the film. This film created a new image of Victor Banerjee, that of an action hero which became favourable among the masses. In the pre-interval scene, the murder and rape scene was portrayed violently in a Bengali film, for the first time, so the film got A certificate from the Censor Board

Pratikaar was remade in Telugu and Tamil in 1988 as Raktha Tilakam and Thaimel Aanai, respectively. It was later remade in Hindi in 1991 under the same title.

== Plot ==
The intelligent student Shankar becomes a vigilante after the violent murder of his mother and the brutal rape of his sister, by the local goons who kidnaps women and sell them outsides. When he starts avenging, DSP Rajib Chowdhury who is childhood friend of Shankar, comes on the board to investigate the murder mysteries done by Shankar.

== Cast ==
- Victor Banerjee as Shankar Banerjee / Awbotaar Bhai
- Chiranjeet Chakraborty as DSP Rajib Chowdhury
- Debashree Roy as Shikha
- Madhabi Chakraborty as Madhuri Banerjee, Shankar's mother
- Satabdi Roy as Sandhya Banerjee, Shankar's sister
- Shakuntala Barua as Rajib's wife
- Utpal Dutt as Abinash Sen
- Biplab Chatterjee as Ratan Ghosh, Abinash's henchman
- Sukhen Das as Rahim Bhai, owner of a garage
- Chhaya Devi as Burima
- Nimu Bhowmik as Bhuban, Abinash's manager
- Tarun Mitra as Inspector Dinanath Das
- Masud Patel as goon

== Production ==
In 1977 during the shooting of Ananda Ashram, Prabhat Roy narrated the script of Protidan and Pratikaar to Uttam Kumar. Kumar, who helped Roy to learn how screenplay and dialogues are written during Amanush's pre-production in 1974, appreciated him for the brilliant story idea. Then Kumar suggested him to cast Mithun Chakaraborty to play the protagonist, as the character needed a proper body physique for the action sequences. After making his debut in 1983 through Protidan, Roy narrated the script of Pratikaar to Chakraborty, but he had to turn down the film as he was busy in Mumbai and it was difficult for him to shoot a film separately in Kolkata. Then Roy took a risk by casting Victor Banerjee in the role, with whom he had worked in his previous film Protidan. Banerjee, who was playing villainous roles in mainstream Bengali films and art house dramas at that point of time, took a proper training for the characteristics and action sequences. After the release of the film, both mass and class audiences praised Banerjee's performance in this field and audience as well as fans started calling him as 'Vigilante Star' and considered him to be the next action hero, after Uttam Kumar, Ranjit Mallick and Mithun Chakraborty.

== Soundtrack ==
All lyrics are written by Gauriprasanna Mazumder; all music is composed by Bappi Lahiri.

Track listing
| No. | Title | Lyrics | Music | Singer | Length |
|---|---|---|---|---|---|
| 1. | "Ek Je Chhilo Duorani" | Gauriprasanna Mazumder | Bappi Lahiri | Asha Bhosle | 3:59 |
| 2. | "Dol Dol Dol Baaja Shobai Khol" | Gauriprasanna Mazumder | Bappi Lahiri | Chandrani Mukherjee; Abhijit Bhattacharya; Muhammad Aziz | 6:13 |
| 3. | "Ghumer Chhaya Ghoniye Ashe" | Gauriparasanna Mazumder | Bappi Lahiri | Asha Bhosle | 1:12 |
| 4. | "Jibon Ta Taar Raajpath Noy" | Gauriprasanna Mazumder | Bappi Lahiri | Bappi Lahiri | 4:40 |
| 5. | "Bhenge Dilo Niyoti" | Gouriprasanna Mazumder | Bappi Lahiri | Bappi Lahiri | 1:29 |
| 6. | "Shonamoni Chhara" | Gouriparasanna Mazumder | Bappi Lahiri | Asha Bhosle | 2:05 |
| 7. | "Ek Je Chhilo Duorani (Male Version)" | Gouriprasanna Mazumder | Bappi Lahiri | Bappi Lahiri | 4:06 |
| Total length: | | | | | 23:45 |

== Remakes ==
Pratikaar was remade several times in other languages. It was first remade in 1988 into Telugu as Raktha Tilakam starring Venkatesh, and the same year into Tamil as Thaimel Aanai starring Arjun Sarja. Later into Hindi, it was remade under the same title in 1991 featuring Anil Kapoor.
