= List of Indian Bengali actresses =

Indian Bengali actress list

The list refers to Indian Bengali actresses who have appeared in cinema and television.

== 1920s ==
Year of debut	Name	Debut film	Ref.
1926	Kanan Devi	Jaidev	
1929	Chandrabati Devi	Piyari	
1929	Umasashi	Bangabala	
	Molina Devi		

== 1930s ==
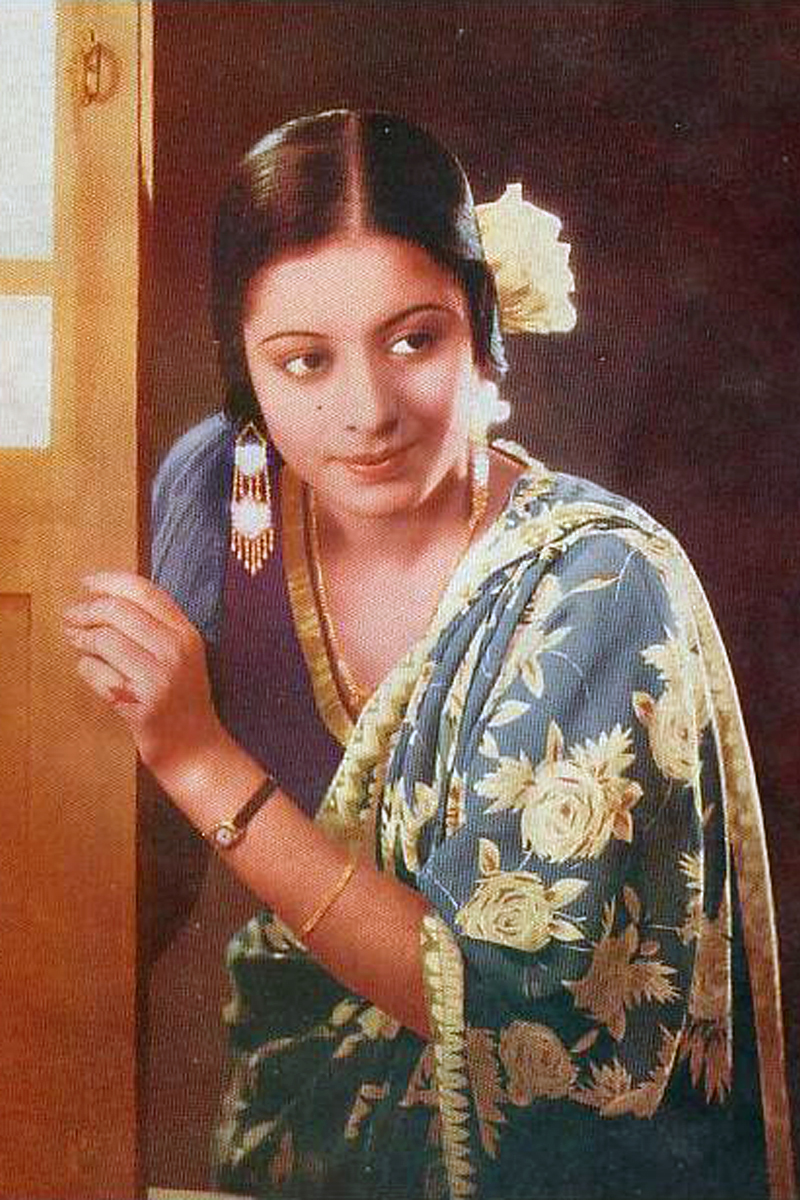
Kanan Devi is considered to be one of the greatest actresses of Bengali cinema

Year of debut	Name	Debut film	Ref.
1931	Padma Devi	Sea Goddess	
1933	Devika Rani	Karma	
1936	Chhaya Devi	Sonar Sansar	
1938	Sandhyarani	Sarbojanin Bibahotsab	

== 1940s ==
Year of debut	Name	Debut film	Ref.
1941	Gita Dey	Ahuti	
1944	Ruma Guha Thakurta	Jwar Bhata	
1944	Sumitra Devi	Sandhi	
1948	Anubha Gupta	Bish Bachhar Age	
1949	Lolita Chatterjee	Ananya	

== 1950s ==
Year of debut	Name	Debut film	Note	Ref.
1950	Madhabi Mukherjee	Kankantala Light Railway		
1951	Sabitri Chatterjee	Sahajatri		
1952	Arundhati Devi	Mahaprasthaner Pathe		
1952	Supriya Devi	Basu Paribar		
1953	Anita Guha	Bansher Kella		
1953	Chitra Sen	Shesher Kabita		
1953	Suchitra Sen	Saat Number Kayedi		
1955	Aparna Sen	Mejo Bou		
1955	Kaberi Bose	Raikamal		
1955	Karuna Banerjee	Pather Panchali		
1956	Sandhya Roy	Mamlar Phal		
1958	Basabi Nandi	Jamalaye Jibanta Manush		
1958	Chitra Sen	Joutuk		
1958	Kajal Gupta	Ajantrik		
1958	Lily Chakravarty	Bhanu Pelo Lottery		
1959	Sharmila Tagore	Apur Sansar		

== 1960s ==
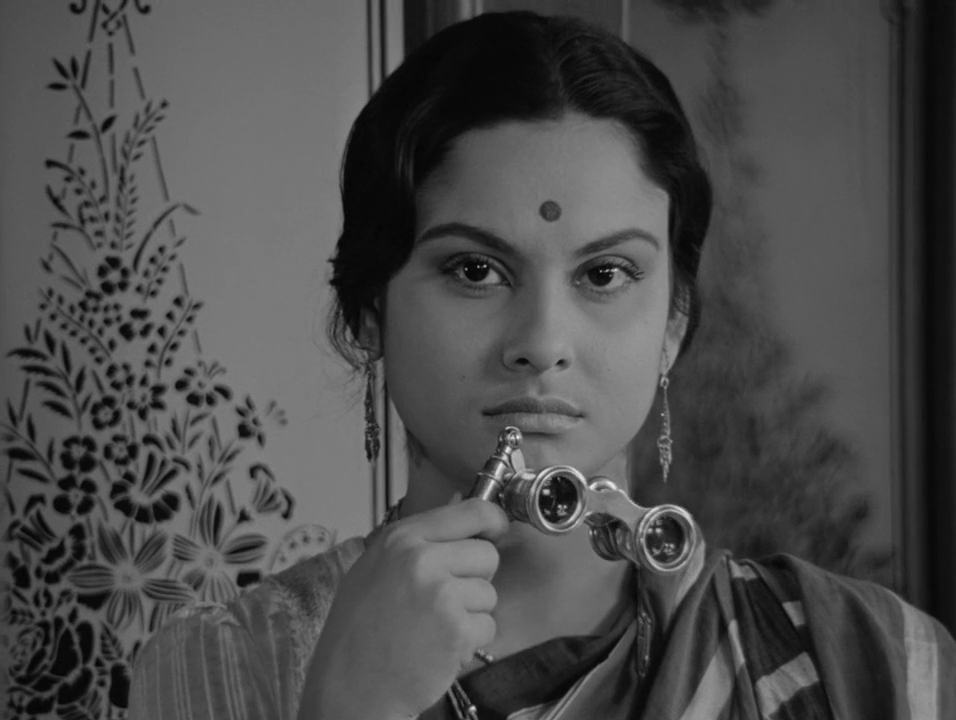
Madhabi Mukherjee is considered to be one of the greatest actresses of Bengali cinema; best remembered for her titular role in Charulata (1964), she was a reigning actress in 1960s

Year of debut	Name	Debut film	Note	Ref.
1960	Sumita Sanyal	Khokababur Pratyabartan		
1961	Kanika Majumdar	Teen Kanya		
1962	Alokananda Roy	Kanchenjungha		
1962	Nanditha Bose	Kanna		
1963	Jaya Bachchan	Mahanagar		
1964	Anjana Bhowmick	Anustup Chanda		
1965	Ratna Ghoshal	Raja Rammohun		
1966	Debashree Roy	Pagal Thakur	Child artist	
1967	Moushumi Chatterjee	Balika Badhu		
1967	Nandini Malia	Chuti		
1967	Rakhee Gulzar	Badhubaran		

== 1970s ==
Year of debut	Name	Debut film	Note	Ref.
1970	Jayashree Kabir	Pratidwandi		
1971	Devika Mukherjee	Fariyad		
1971	Sonali Gupta	Pratham Pratishruti		
1972	Arati Bhattacharya	Ek Adhuri Kahani		
1972	Mithu Mukherjee	Shesh Parba		
1972	Sumitra Mukherjee	Memsaheb		
1973	Anamika Saha	Ashar Alo		
1973	Mahua Roychoudhury	Shriman Prithviraj		
1973	Rajeshwari Raychowdhury	Strir Patra		
1974	Preeti Ganguly			
1974	Soma Dey	Haraye Khuji		
1974	Soma Mukherjee	Asati		
1976	Mamata Shankar	Mrigaya		
1979	Shakuntala Barua	Sunayani		
1979	Alpana Goswami	Arun Barun O Kiranmala		
	Tanusree Shankar			

== 1980s ==
Year of debut	Name	First acting assignment		Note	Ref.
Year of debut	Name	Film	TV series	Note	Ref.
1980	Meenakshi Goswami	Dakshayagna			
1980	Sreela Majumdar	Parasuram			
1981	Sanghamitra Bandyopadhyay	Kalankini Kankabati			
1982	Moon Moon Sen	Rajbadhu			
1983	Konkona Sen Sharma	Indira			
1984	Piya Sengupta	Dadamani			
1985	Papiya Adhikari	Sonar Sansar			
1985	Rupali Ganguly	Saaheb		Child artist	
1985	Swatilekha Sengupta	Ghare Baire			
1986	Amala Akkineni	Mythili Ennai Kaathali			
1986	Indrani Haldar		Tero Parban		
1986	Kheyali Dastidar		Tero Parban		
1986	Laboni Sarkar		Sei Samay		
1986	Nayna Bandyopadhyay	Pathbhola		Opposite Prosenjit Chatterjee	
1986	Roopa Ganguly	Nirupama			
1986	Sagarika	Shyam Saheb			
1986	Satabdi Roy	Atanka			
1987	Aditi Chatterjee		Giribala	Child artist	
1987	Indrani Dutta	Nadiyar Nagor			
1987	Pallavi Chatterjee				
1987	Rita Dutta Chakraborty				
1988	Anuradha Roy	Karoti			
1988	Rituparna Sengupta		Rong Berong		
	Chaiti Ghoshal		Dakghar		
	Sudipta Chakraborty				

== 1990s ==
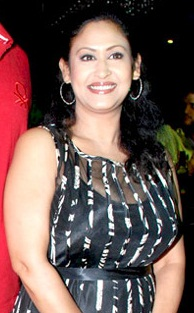
Indrani Haldar

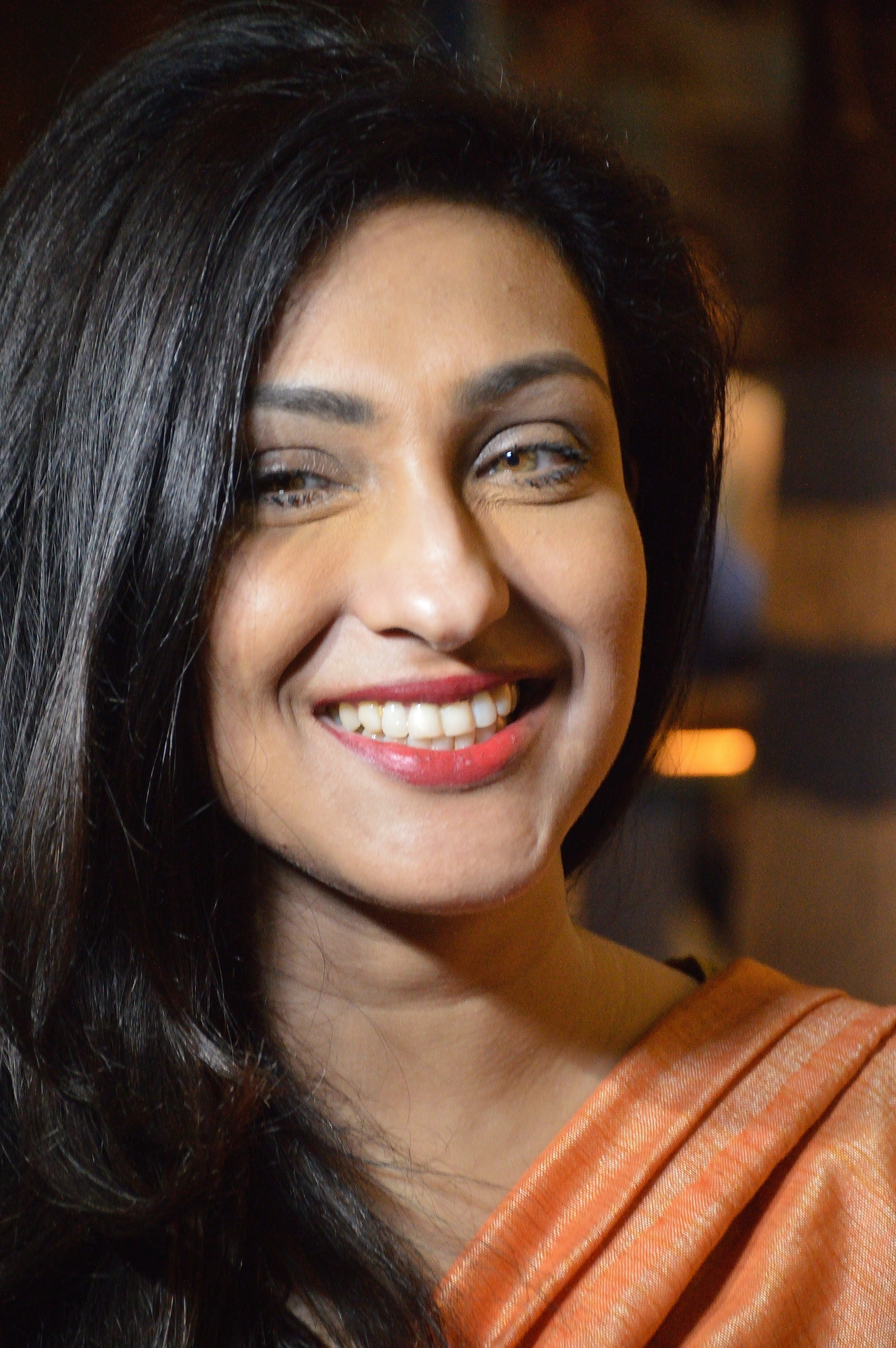
Rituparna Sengupta

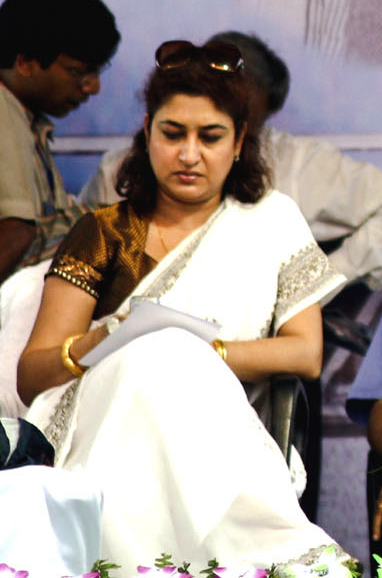
Satabdi Roy

Year of debut	Name	First acting assignment		Note	Ref.
Year of debut	Name	Film	TV series	Note	Ref.
	Churni Ganguly				
1990	Chumki Chowdhury	Hirak Jayanti			
1991	Anashua Majumdar	Mahaprithibi			
1991	Anushree Das	Bourani			
1991	Dolon Roy	Sajani Go Sajani			
1991	Riya Sen	Vishkanya			
1992	Kajol	Bekhudi			
1992	Rita Koiral	Nabarupa			
1993	Rachna Banerjee	Daan Pratidaan			
1993	Sreelekha Mitra		Balikar Prem		
1996	Aparajita Auddy		Manorama Cabin		
1996	Debolina Dutta		Seemarekha		
1996	June Malia		Trishna		
1996	Lisa Ray	Nethaji			
1996	Rani Mukerji	Biyer Phul			
1996	Rimi Sen	Damu			
1996	Sushmita Sen	Dastak			
1997					
1997	Priyanka Upendra	Joddha			
1997	Locket Chatterjee				
1997	Nandini Ghosal	Char Adhyay			
1997	Srabanti Chatterjee	Mayar Badhon		Child artist	
1999	Arpita Chatterjee	Tumi Ele Tai			
1999	Jaya Seal	Amrita			
1999	Manali Dey	Kali Amar Maa			
1999	Monami Ghosh		Saat Kahon		
1999	Raima Sen	Godmother			
1999	Swastika Mukherjee		Debdasi		
	Bidipta Chakraborty				
	Mithu Chakrabarty				
	Mousumi Saha				
	Rimjhim Mitra				

== 2000s ==
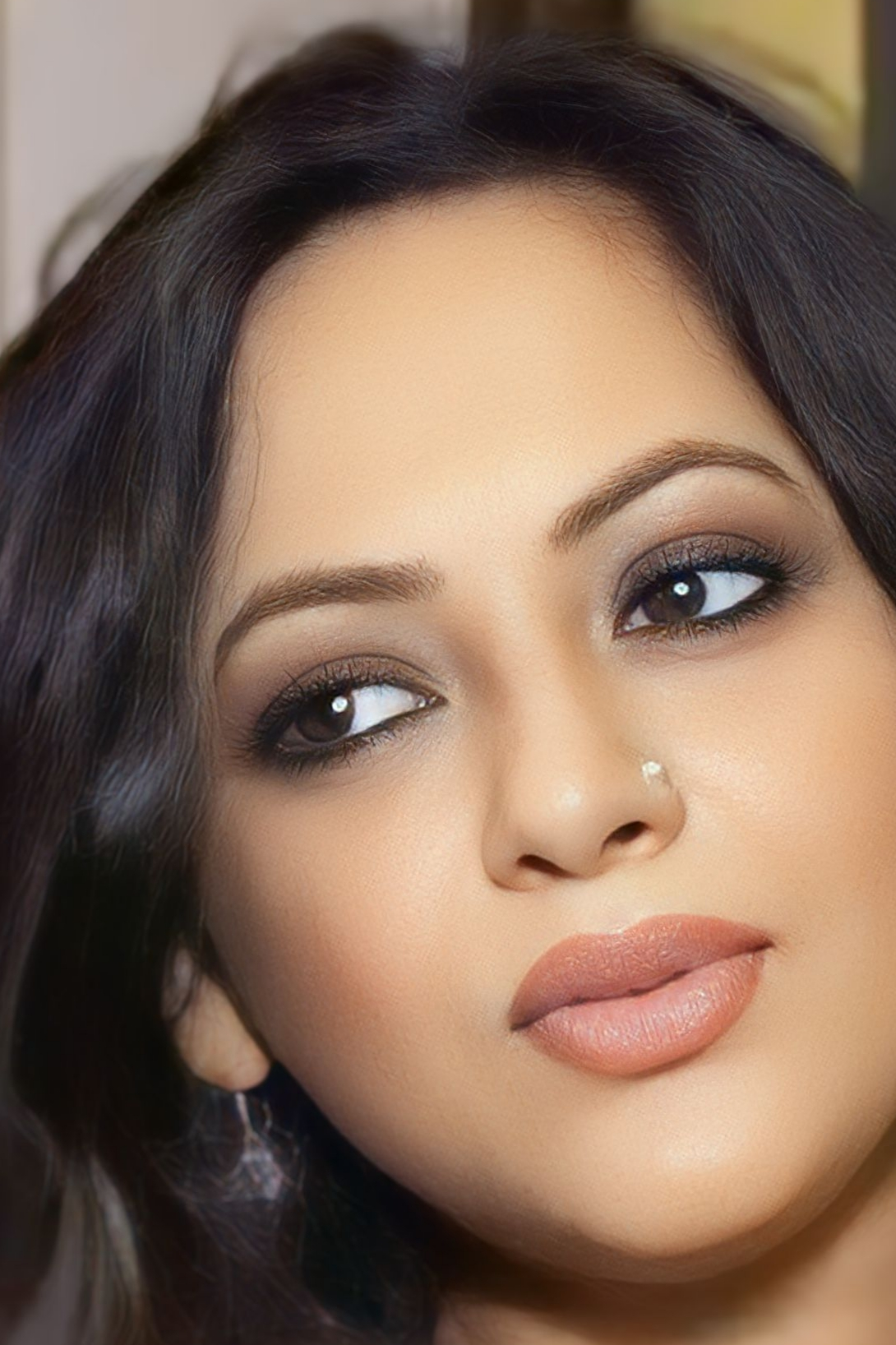
Sreelekha Mitra

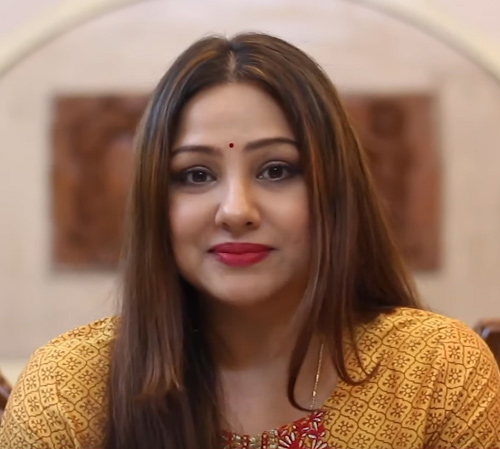
Priyanka Trivedi

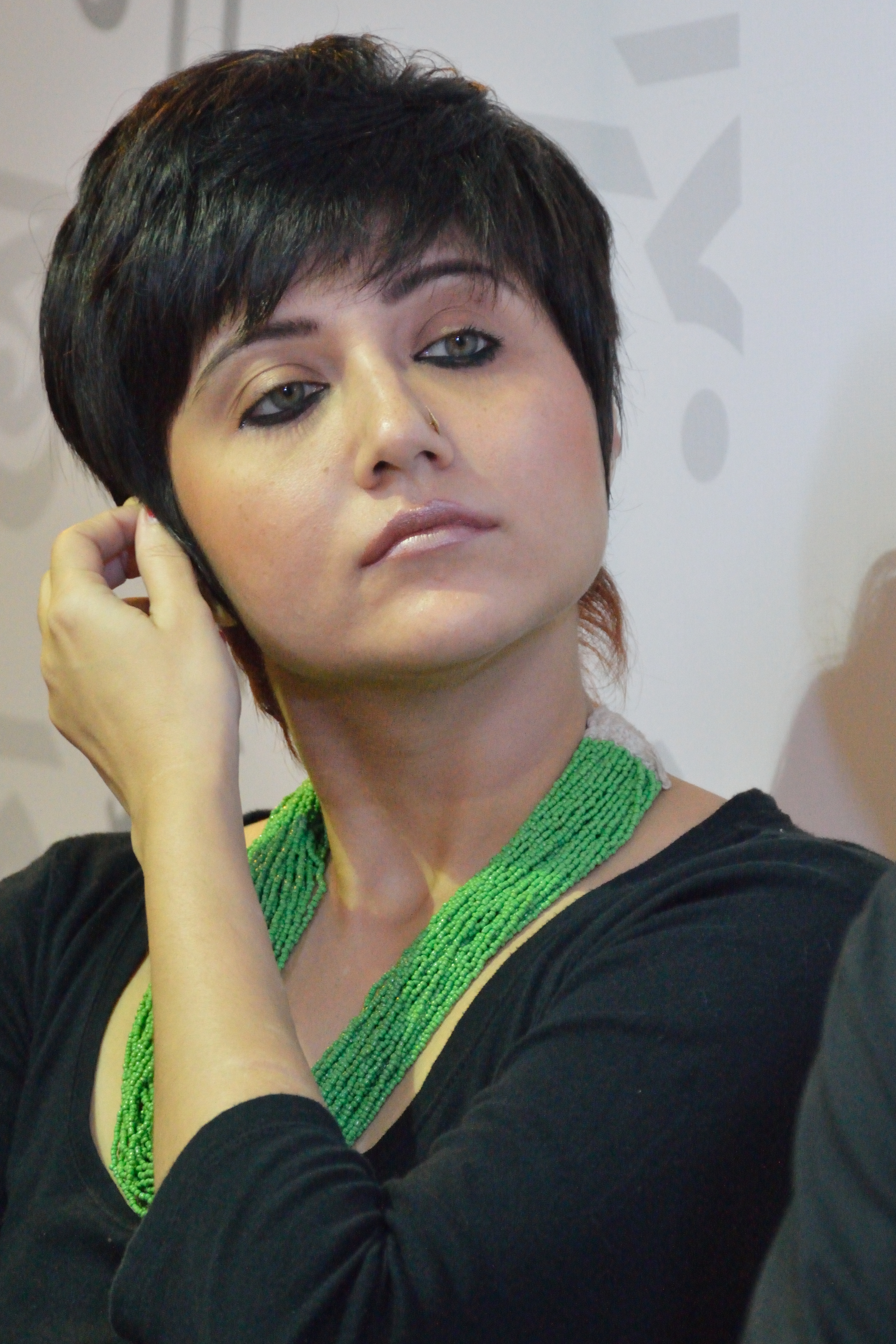
Swastika Mukherjee

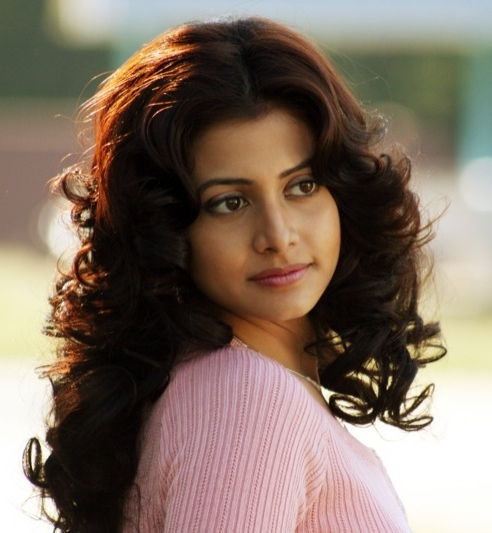
Koel Mallick

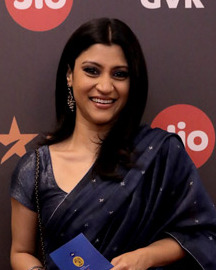
Konkona Sen Sharma

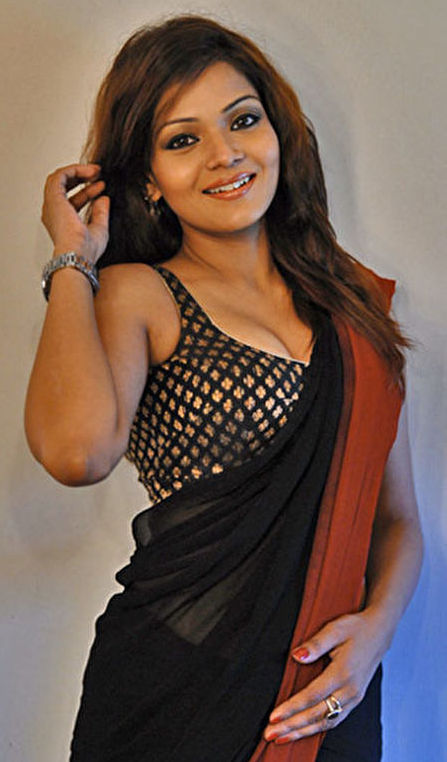
Arunima Ghosh

Year of debut	Name	First acting assignment		Ref.
Year of debut	Name	Film	TV series	Ref.
2000	Arunima Ghosh	Rinmukti		
2000	Chandrayee Ghosh		Jamabhoomi	
2000	Kamalika Banerjee		Ek Akasher Niche	
2000	Koneenica Banerjee		Ek Akasher Niche	
2000	Reema Sen	Chitram		
2000	Samata Das		Ek Akasher Niche	
2000	Sohini Sengupta	Paromitar Ek Din		
2001	Ananya Chatterjee		Chena Mukher Sari	
2001	Bipasha Basu	Ajnabee		
2002	Koena Mitra	Road		
	Priyanka Sarkar		Jodi Prem Chilona Prane	
2003	Angana Basu	Alo		
2003	Anjana Basu		Robir Aloy	
2003	Koel Mallick	Nater Guru		
2003	Paoli Dam		Jibon Niye Khela	
2003	Payel Sarkar			
2003	Priyanka Kothari	Jay Jay		
2003	Tanisha	Sssshhh		
2003	Tannishtha Chatterjee	Swaraaj		
2004	Aparajita Ghosh Das	Iti Srikanta		
2004	Kamalinee Mukherjee	Phir Milenge		
2005	Nandana Sen	Black		
2005	Tanushree Dutta	Aashiq Banaya Aapne		
2006	Payel De		Ekdin Pratidin	
2006	Ena Saha		Raat Bhor Brishti	
2006	Mouni Ray		Kyunki Saas Bhi Kabhi Bahu Thi	
2006	Shahana Goswami	Yun Hota Toh Kya Hota		
2006	Sohini Sarkar		Ekdin Pratidin	
2007	Parno Mittra		Khela	
2007	Ridhima Ghosh	Ratparir Rupkatha		
2007	Subhashree Ganguly	Pitribhumi		
2008	Ditipriya Roy		Durga	
2008	Puja Banerjee		Kahaani Hamaaray Mahaabhaarat Ki	
2008	Sandipta Sen		Durga	
2008	Shweta Bhattacharya			
2009	Darshana Banik		Bou Katha Kaou	
2009	Moubani Sorcar	Badla		
2009	Mumtaz Sorcar	Bhorai: The Maladies of Dawn		
2009	Rajanya Mitra		Ogo Bodhu Sundori	
2009	Ritabhari Chakraborty		Ogo Bodhu Sundori	
2009	Sayantika Banerjee	Ghar Sansar		
	Saayoni Ghosh	Ichche Dana		
	Sampurna Lahiri			

== 2010s ==
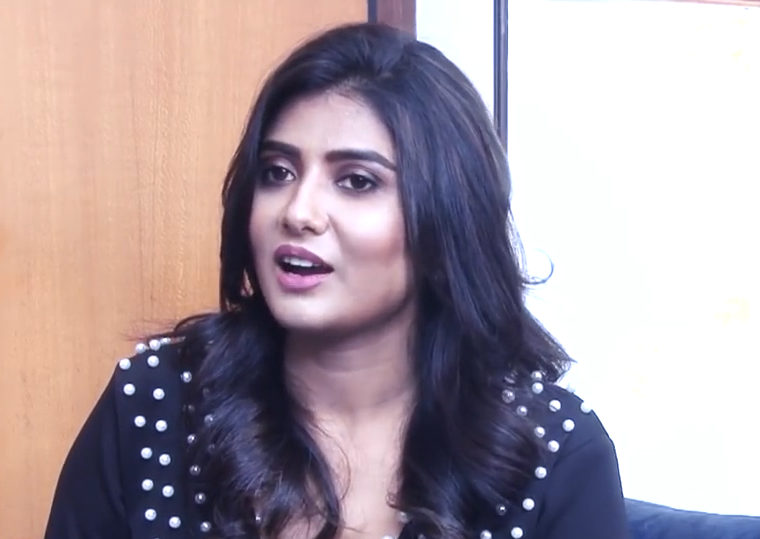
Parno Mittra

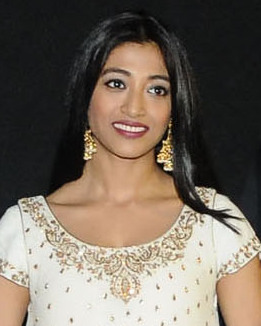
Paoli Dam

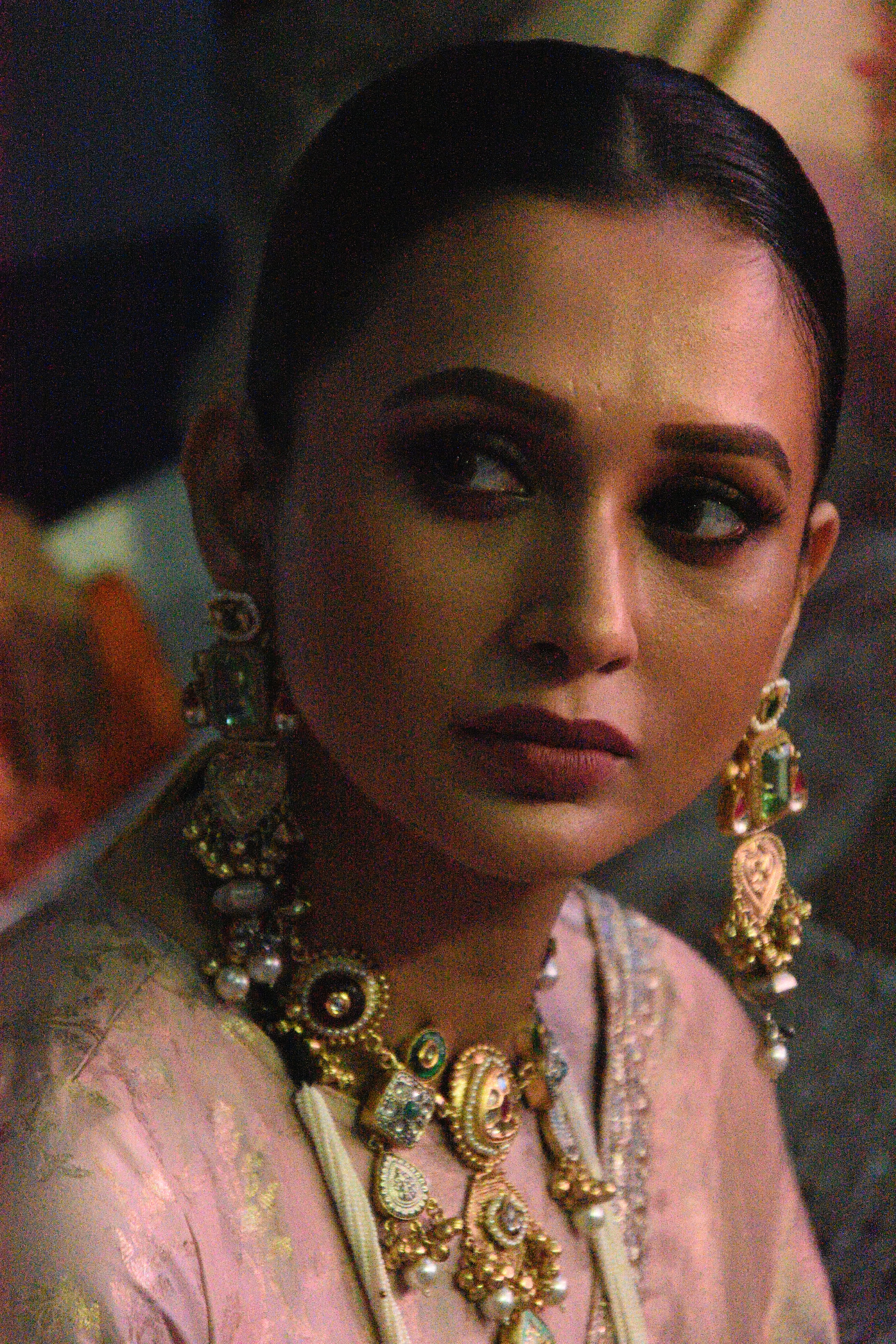
Mimi

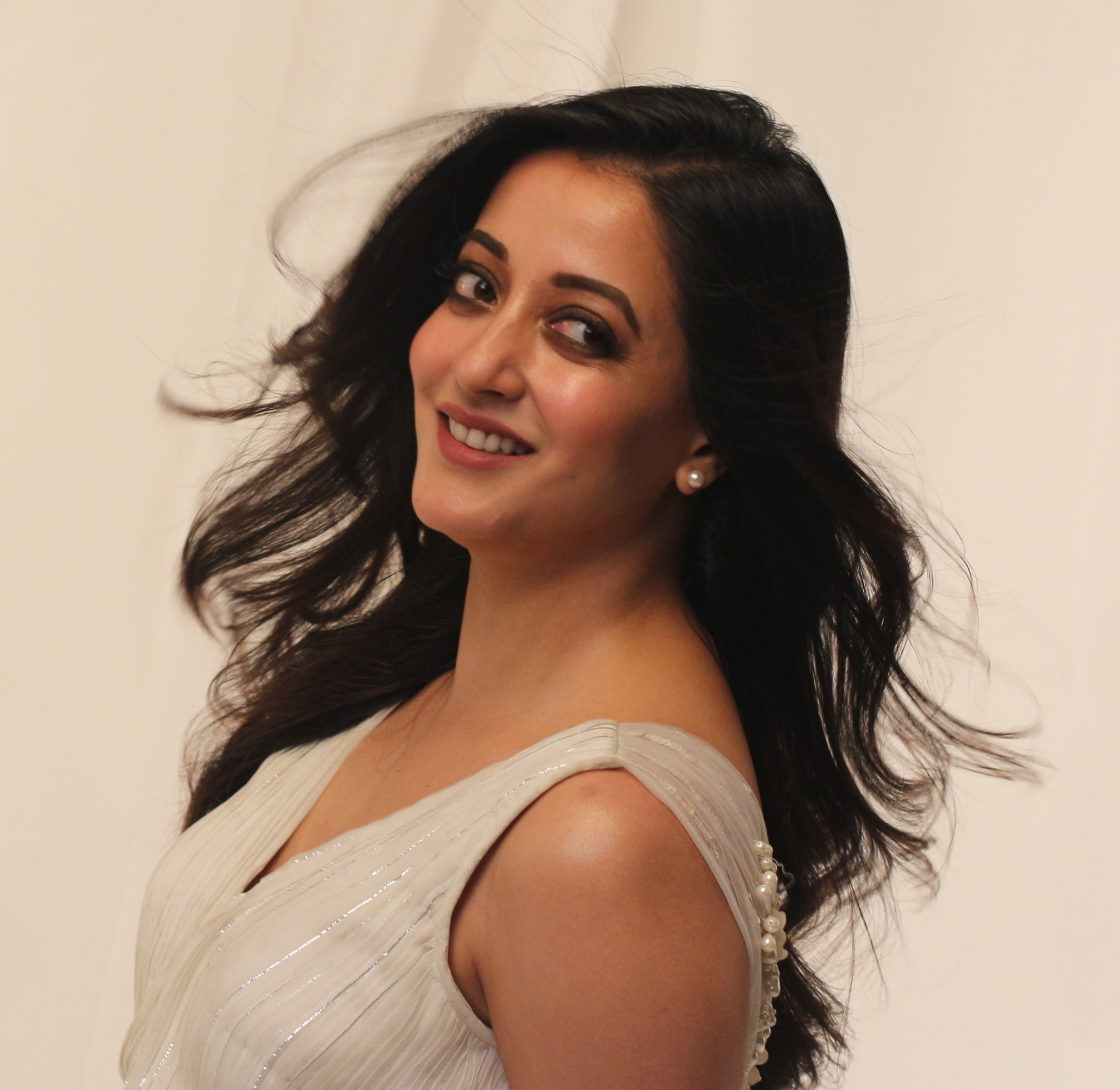
Raima Sen

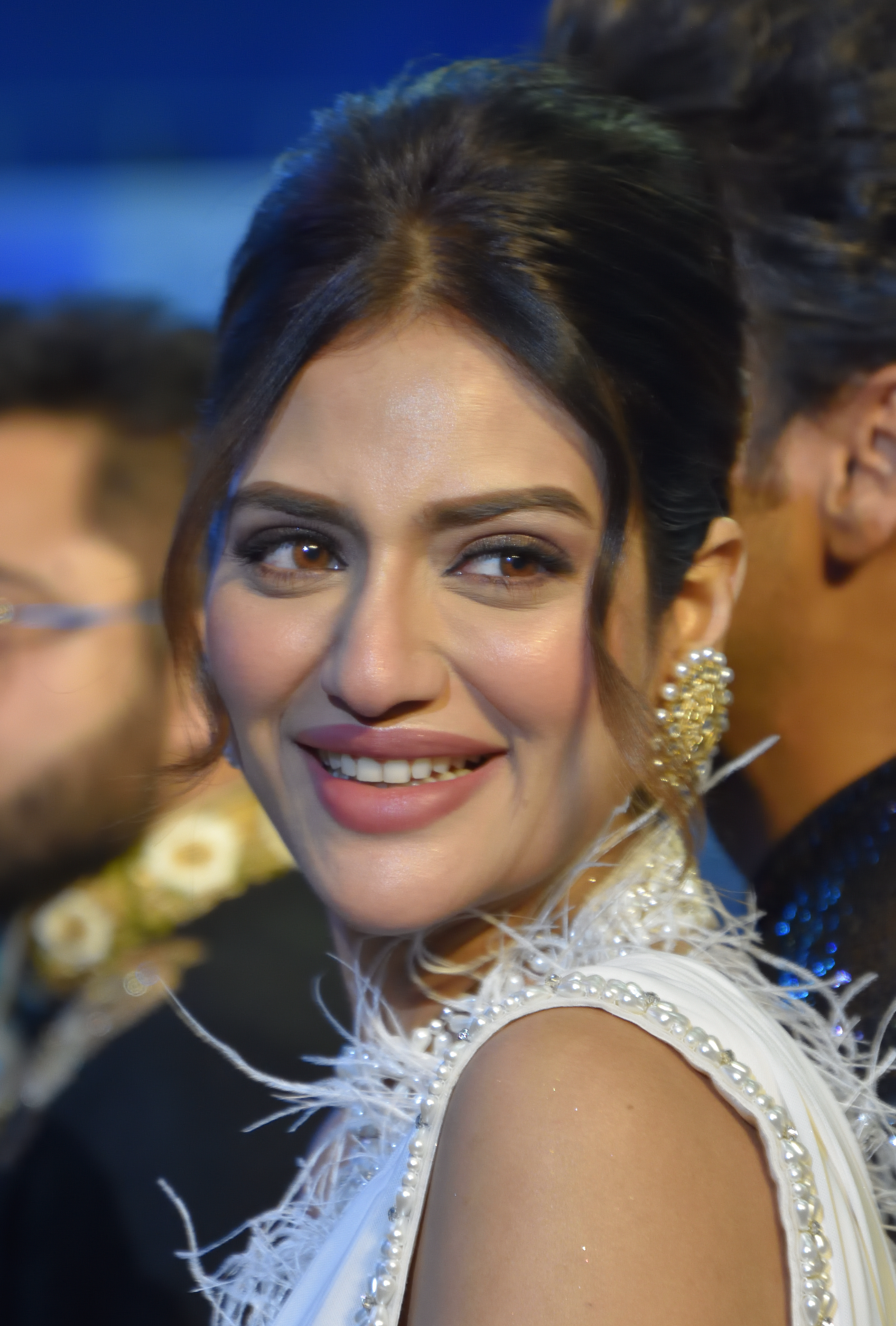
Nusrat Jahan

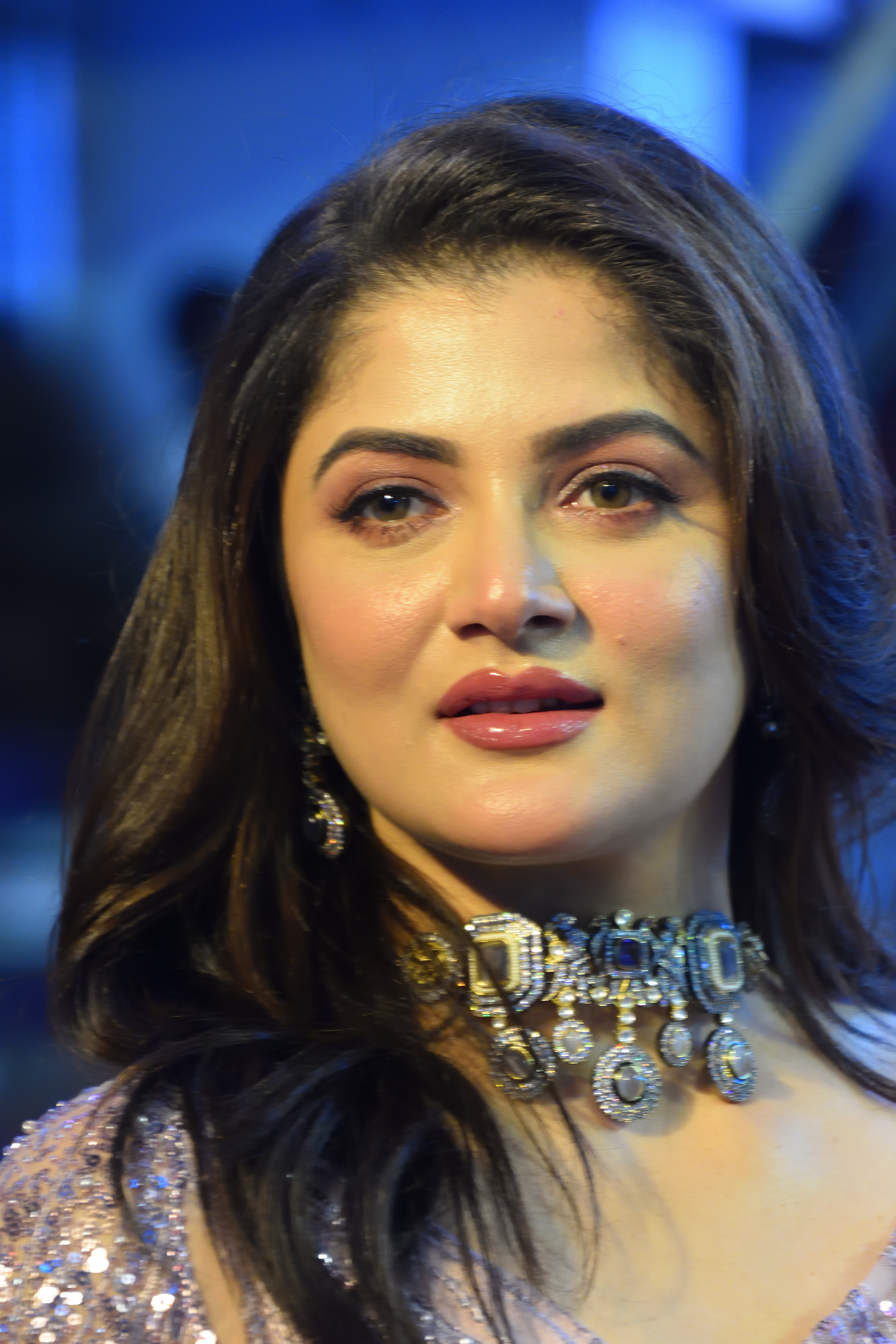
Srabanti

Year of debut	Name	First acting assignment		Ref.
Year of debut	Name	Film	TV series	Ref.
2010	Anindita Bose	Clerk		
2010	Basabdatta Chatterjee		Gaaner Oparey	
2010	Mimi Chakraborty		Gaaner Oparey	
2010	Richa Gangopadhyay	Leader		
2011	Amrita Chattopadhyay		Kanakanjali	
2011	Madhumita Sarcar		Sobinoy Nibedon	
2011	Nusrat Jahan	Shatru		
2012	Sauraseni Maitra	Chittagong		
2013	Jhilik Bhattacharjee	Tomay Bhalobasi		
2014	Rooqma Ray		Kiranmala	
2015	Koushani Mukherjee	Parbona Toke Charte Ami		
2015	Swastika Dutta	Parbona Toke Charte Ami		
2016	Ishaa Saha		Jhanjh Lobongo Phool	
2016	Soumitrisha Kundu		E Amar Gurudakshina	
2016	Trina Saha		Khokababu	
2017	Rukmini Maitra	Chaamp		
2018	Tuhina Das	Aschhe Abar Shabor		
2019	Idhika Paul		Arabbya Rajani	

== 2020s ==
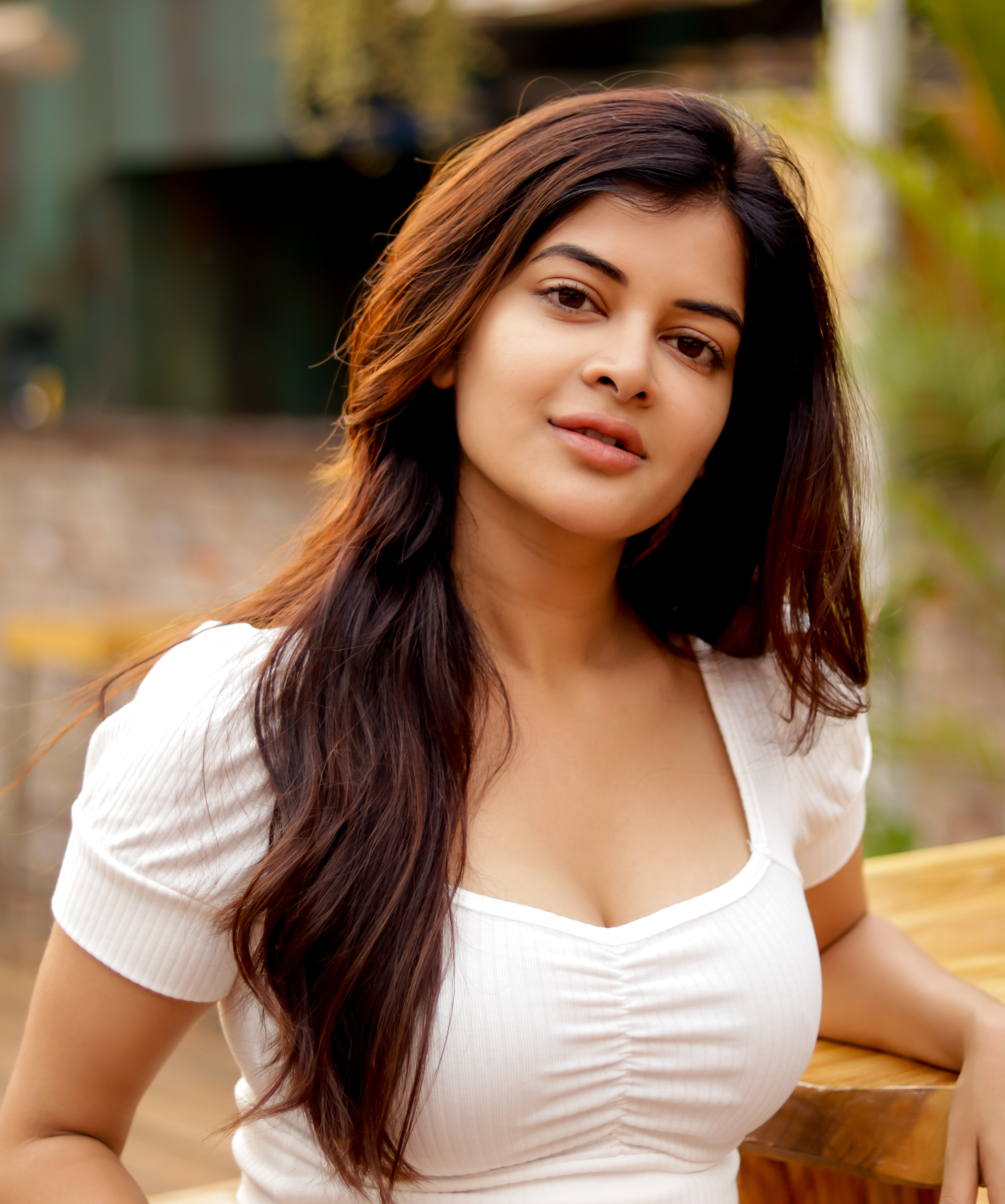
Madhumita Sarcar

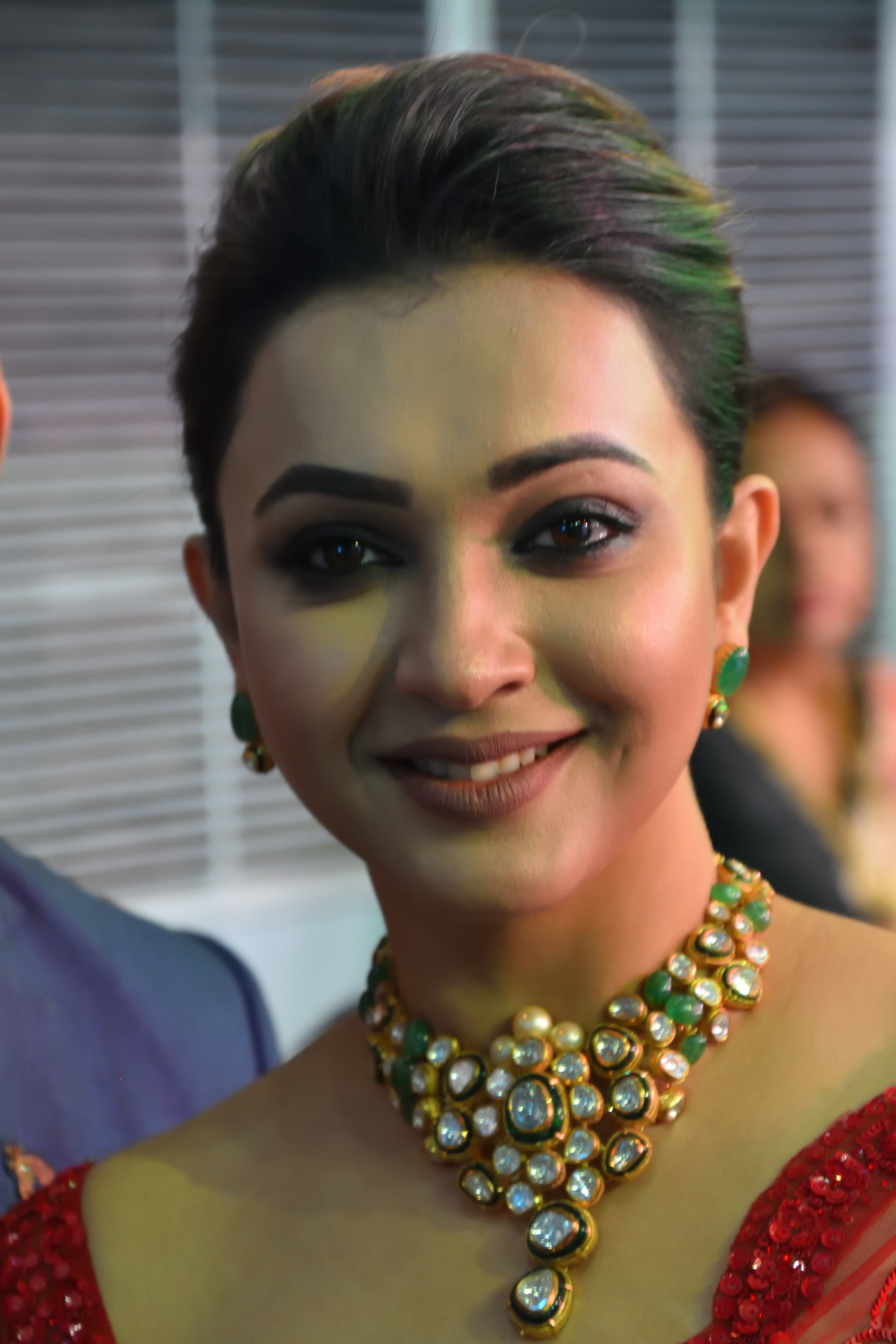
Koushani Mukherjee

Year of debut	Name	First acting assignment		Ref.
Year of debut	Name	Film	TV series	Ref.
2021	Susmita Chatterjee	Prem Tame		

== See also ==
- List of Bangladeshi actresses
