= Purnendu Pattrea =

Indian film director (1931–1997)

- Born: 2 February 1931; Nakol, Howrah, Bengal Presidency, British India
- Died: 19 March 1997 (aged 66)
- Occupations: Poet, writer, editor, artist, illustrator, film Director
- Spouse: Uma Patri
- Children: One son, three daughters
- Writing career
- Language: Bengali, English
- Notable works: Strir Patra, Kathopokathan

Purnendu Patri (often anglicised as Purnendu Pattrea; 2 February 1931 – 19 March 1997) was an Indian poet, writer, editor, artist, illustrator, and film director. He was best known for his poems and stories, particularly for his poetry collection Kathopokathan in Bengali, and for his experimentation with book cover design. He also was a researcher of the history of Kolkata.

== Career ==
Pattrea was admitted to Indian Art College in 1949. He started contributing his painting and writing to the film magazine "Chitrita", and the cultural magazine "Deepali", which were edited and co-edited respectively by his uncle Nikunjabihari Pattrea. His first collection of poems, Ek Mutho Rod ("a Handful of Sun"), was published in 1951. In 1958, his first novel, Dnarer Moyna ("Caged Myna"), won him the then prestigious award 'Manik Smriti Purashkar' by Ultarath Publication. He was the first art director of the Ananda Bazar Patrika group of publications, from 1971 to 1984/85.

Pattrea was the director and screenwriter for the 1972 film Strir Patra. This was awarded the Rajat Kamal (Silver Lotus) for Best Feature Film in Bengali, at the 20th National Film Awards. The film also received the Award for Best Direction at the Tashkent Film Festival. His other films included Swapnoniye, Malancha, Chhenra Tamsuk, Chhotobakulpurer jatri etc.

His first solo painting exhibition was held in British Council, Kolkata in 1982. He also had his other solo exhibitions held in Jehangir Art Gallery, Bombay and Cema Art Gallery, Kolkata. He started a research project on Bankim Chandra Chatterjee, 'Bankim Jug' (The Era of Bankim); unfortunately only the first of five planned volumes was published before his death.

== Filmography ==
Year	Title	Cast	Notes	Ref.
1966	Swapno Niye	Madhabi Mukherjee,		
1973	Strir Patra	Madhabi Mukherjee, Rajeshwari Raychowdhury		
1974	Chhera Tamsuk	Sumitra Mukherjee		
1982	Malancha	Madhabi Mukherjee, Santu Mukherjee, Sumitra Mukherjee		
1987	Chhoto Bokulpurer Jatri	Nimu Bhowmik, Meghnad Bhattacharya		
