= Amar Kantak =

1986 film by Sukhen Das

Amarkantak
- Directed by: Sukhen Das
- Based on: Sonar Kathi Rupar Kathi by Ashutosh Mukhopadhyay
- Produced by: Mala Gupta
- Starring: Chiranjeet; Moon Moon Sen; Sukhen Das; Sumitra Mukherjee; Deepankar Dey
- Music by: Ajoy Das
- Release date: 5 December 1986
- Country: India
- Language: Bengali

Amarkantak is a 1986 Bengali drama film directed by Sukhen Das and produced by Mala Gupta. It stars Chiranjeet, Moon Moon Sen, along with Sukhen Das, Sumitra Mukherjee, Deepankar Dey in another supporting roles. The film was loosely based on the novel Sonar Kathi, Rupar Kathi of Ashutosh Mukhopadhyay. It was made under the banner of Parna Chitram. This movie received BFJA award in 1987.

== Plot ==
Writer Debesh goes from place to place searching for his younger brother Binoy, who has been missing for a long time. Debesh goes to an Ashram in Amarkantak and meets a lady monk named Bahinji. He realises that Bahinji is hiding something. Later she narrates her story which reveals the missing history of Binoy.

== Cast ==
- Chiranjeet as Binoy "Binu"
- Moon Moon Sen as Urmila "Urmi" / Bahin
- Sukhen Das as Debesh "Debu"
- Sumitra Mukherjee as Rani Ahalya
- Deepankar Dey as Thakur Janaklal
- Shakuntala Barua as Courtesan

== Songs ==
- "Chitatei Sob Shesh" - Kishore Kumar
- "Tumi Maa Amake" - Kishore Kumar
- "Dhinak Dhinak Dhin Ta" - Amit Kumar
- "Andhakare Aalo Dite" - Asha Bhosle
- "Chokher Janla Khule" - Asha Bhosle
- "Rooper Ei Jadute" - Asha Bhosle
- "Na Na Na Thumri Gajol Noy" - Parimal Bhattacharya, Rooprekha Banerjee
