= Pratikar =

Pratikar प्रतिकार
- DVD cover
- Directed by: T. Rama Rao
- Screenplay by: Paruchuri Brothers
- Dialogues by: Anwar Khan
- Story by: Prabhat Roy
- Based on: Raktha Tilakam
- Produced by: Firoz A. Nadiadwala
- Starring: Raakhee; Anil Kapoor; Madhuri Dixit
- Cinematography: V. Durga Prasad
- Edited by: I. M. Kunu
- Music by: Bappi Lahiri
- Production company: A. G. Films
- Release date: 16 August 1991
- Country: India
- Language: Hindi

Pratikar is a 1991 Indian Hindi-language action drama film directed by T. Rama Rao. It stars Raakhee, Anil Kapoor, Madhuri Dixit, with Mohsin Khan, Sonu Walia in other roles. The film is a remake of 1987 Bengali film Pratikaar, which was also remade in Telugu as Raktha Tilakam and in Tamil as Thaimel Aanai.

== Plot ==
After the court judgment, Narayan Shrivastav was very happy, but he was unaware that his greedy and evil brother, Sajjan, wanted to kill him for his entire property. While they are travelling back to their home, Sajjan kills Narayan. After returning home, he sheds crocodile tears, but Krishna, knowing that his uncle Sajjan is not a good person, doesn't want to stay with him and says that he wants to stay with his late mother's friend and his school teacher, Saraswati. At midnight, Sajjan sends a goon to kill Krishna, but by mistake, the goon takes the child of Saraswati and throws him in the river. Luckily, the inspector arrives there looking for some drug dealers and sees a goon throwing something in the river. When he goes to check, he finds an unconscious child, so he takes him to the hospital. Meanwhile, Saraswati, thinking his son Suraj is dead, leaves for another city with her daughter Jyoti and Krishna. Now Saraswati looks after Krishna and Jyoti. Time flies, and now Krishna, who is a college student, falls in love with his college mate Madhu. Sajjan's son Raghu turns out to be a local goon, protected by his dad through bribing the local police. Jyoti is raped and murdered by Raghu and his pals; they also run over Saraswati, rendering her crippled. Both Krishna and Saraswati swear to avenge Jyoti's death. Then Suraj re-enters their lives, as a police inspector, and is bent on arresting Krishna by hook or by crook, casting doubts whether he is or not on the payroll of Sajjan.

== Cast ==
- Raakhee as Saraswati
- Anil Kapoor as Krishna Shrivastav
- Madhuri Dixit as Madhu
- Mohsin Khan as Suraj Singh
- Sonu Walia as Uma Singh
- Paresh Rawal as Sajjan Shrivastav
- Satyendra Kapoor as Narayan Shrivastav
- Chandrashekhar as Bihari
- Satish Shah as Inspector Das
- Om Prakash as Shankar Prasad
- Nirupa Roy as Parvati Prasad
- Aruna Irani as Mrs. Diwani
- Asrani as Mr. Diwani
- Amita Nangia as Jyoti
- Laxmikant Berde as Bat Shastri
- Tej Sapru as Raghu Shrivastav
- Mahesh Anand as Naag
- Manik Irani as Billa

== Music ==
Song	Singer
"Hungama Ho Jaye Hungama"	Alka Yagnik, Bappi Lahiri
"Kaali Zulfen Gore Gaal Tirchhi Topi Bikhre Baal"	Asha Bhosle, Mohammed Aziz
"Chitthi Mujhe Likhna"	Asha Bhosle, Amit Kumar
"Baahar Saare Mele Andar Hum Akele"	Anuradha Paudwal, Sudesh Bhosle
"Log Mujhe Kehte Hain"	Parvati Khan
