= Maan Maryada =

- Directed by: Sukhen Das
- Produced by: Pranab Bose
- Starring: Satabdi Roy; Tapas Paul; Samit Bhanja; Utpal Dutta; Subhendu Chatterjee; Sukhen Das; Koushik Bandyopadhyay; Arindam Ganguly; Anuradha Ray; Devika Mukherjee
- Music by: Ajoy Das
- Release date: 1991
- Country: India
- Language: Bengali

Maan Maryada is a 1991 Bengali film directed by Sukhen Das. The film's music has been directed by Ajoy Das.

== Cast ==
- Satabdi Roy
- Tapas Paul
- Samit Bhanja
- Utpal Dutta
- Subhendu Chatterjee
- Sukhen Das
- Koushik Bandyopadhyay
