= Ajoy Das =

Ajoy Das may refer to:

- Ajoy Das (cricketer), Bengali cricketer
- Ajoy Das (music director) (1941–2013), Bengali composer and music director
