= Srikanter Will =

- Directed by: Dinen Gupta
- Produced by: Jaganmata Films
- Starring: Uttam Kumar; Sumitra Mukherjee; Ranjit Mallick; Bikash Roy
- Music by: Salil Chowdhury
- Release date: 28 September 1979
- Country: India
- Language: Bengali

Srikanter Will is a 1979 Indian Bengali-language action drama film directed by Dinen Gupta. The film was released under the banner of Jaganmata Films and its music was composed by Salil Chowdhury. The film starred Uttam Kumar, Sumitra Mukherjee and Ranjit Mallick in lead roles.

== Cast ==
- Uttam Kumar as Srikanta
- Dipti Roy as Srikanta's mother
- Bikash Ray as Srikanta's uncle
- Geeta Dey
- Ranjit Mallick
- Sumitra Mukherjee
- Ratna Ghoshal

== Soundtrack ==
All music is composed by Salil Chowdhury.

song title
No.	Title	singer(s)	Length
1.	"Chhuk Chhuk Chhuk Kore Rail Gari"	Manna Dey, Sabita Chowdhury	6:31
2.	"Naam Shakuntala Taar"	K. J. Yesudas, Sabita Chowdhury	3:19
3.	"O Amar Joto Saadh"	Aarti Mukherjee	3:16
Total length:			13:06
