= List of Bengali actresses =

List of Bengali actresses may refer to:

- List of Bangladeshi film artists
- List of Indian Bengali actresses
