= Achena Atithi (1973 film) =

1973 Indian film

- Directed by: Sukhen Das; Gyanesh Mukherjee
- Starring: Rabi Ghosh; Samit Bhanja; Sukhen Das; Ratna Ghoshal; Jnanesh Mukhopadhyay; Satindra Bhattacharya; Shekhar Chattopadhyay; Swarup Dutta; Jogesh Sadhu; Joyshree Ray
- Cinematography: Dipak Das
- Edited by: Ramesh Joshi; Kaliprasad Ray
- Music by: Ajoy Das
- Production company: Sara Productions
- Release date: 30 November 1973
- Country: India
- Language: Bengali

Achena Atithi is a 1973 Bengali film directed by Sukhen Das and Gyanesh Mukherjee. This film was released under the banner Sara Productions. The film stars Rabi Ghosh, Samit Bhanja, Sukhen Das in the lead roles. The film's music was composed by Ajoy Das.

== Cast ==
- Rabi Ghosh
- Samit Bhanja
- Sukhen Das
- Ratna Ghoshal as Nila
- Gyanesh Mukherjee
- Swarup Dutta
- Jogesh Sadhu
- Joyshree Ray
