= Chhera Tamsuk =

1974 Bengali film

Chhera Tamsuk is a Bengali drama film directed by Purnendu Pattrea based on a novel of Bengali writer Samaresh Basu. This film was released on 1 January 1974.

== Cast ==
- Ranjit Mallick
- Sumitra Mukherjee
- Biplab Chatterjee
- Nimu Bhowmik
- Bibhas Chakraborty
- Nilkantha Sengupta
- Shyamal Sen
- Promode Ganguly
- Gopa Bandyopadhyay
- Shibnath Bandyopadhyay
- Dilip Bannerjee
