= Rajnandini =

Film

Rajnandini (transl. The Princess) is a Bengali romantic drama film directed by Sukhen Das. This film was released in 1980 under the banner of S.D Films.

== Cast ==
- Uttam Kumar
- Bikash Roy
- Subhendu Chatterjee
- Sabitri Chatterjee
- Sukhen Das
- Chhaya Devi
- Shakuntala Barua
- Anamika Saha
- Sumitra Mukherjee
- Sisir Batabyal
