= Abhinoy Noy =

1983 film

- Directed by: Archan Chakraborty
- Produced by: Shila Bhanja
- Starring: Santu Mukhopadhyay; Asim Dutta; Anup Kumer; Samit Bhanja
- Cinematography: Shankar Banerjee; Kamal Nayak
- Music by: Dilip
- Distributed by: Eastern Talkies Ltd. Usharani Films Distributor; National Cine Equipments
- Release date: 1983
- Country: India
- Language: Bengali

Abhinoy Noy is a 1983 Indian Bengali language romance film directed by Archan Chakraborty.

== Cast ==
- Aparna Sen
- Anup Kumar
- Samit Bhanja as Gamesh (Director)
- Santu Mukhopadhyay as Bhola & Bikram
- Asim Dutta as Hemlata (Heroine)
- Dilip Ray asDinu (Caretaker of a Loge at Koshi Gram)
- Sambhu Bhattachayra
- Alpana Goswami as Pal (Film Producer)
- Ramen Chattopadhyay as Sumitra
- Debprasad Singh as Vikoge Popale
- Sumitra Mukherjee
- Kumkum Bhattacharya
- Sunil Bandyopadhyay
