= Bagha Jatin (1958 film) =

1958 Bengali film

- Directed by: Hiranmoy Sen
- Starring: Dhiraj Bhattacharya; Nimu Bhowmik
- Production company: Bharati Chitram Private Limited
- Release date: 27 June 1958
- Country: India
- Language: Bengali

Bagha Jatin is a Bengali biographical film directed by Hiranmoy Sen based on the life of Indian revolutionary Bagha Jatin. This film was released on 27 June 1958 under the banner of Bharati Chitram Private Limited. This is the debut film of Bengali actor Nimu Bhowmik.

== Plot ==
The film portrays the life of Bengali freedom fighter Jatindranath Mukherjee alias Bagha Jatin and his struggle against the British Imperialism in India. Rabi Ray Chaudhury played the role of the revolutionary Bagha Jatin in this movie which brought him praise from critics.

== Cast ==
- Rabi Ray Chaudhury as Jatindranath Mukherjee
- Dhiraj Bhattacharya
- Nimu Bhowmik
- Chhaya Devi
- Shyam Laha
- Sisir Batabyal
- Bechu Singh
