= Chhoto Bokulpurer Jatri =

- ছোট বকুলপুরের যাত্রী
- Directed by: Purnendu Pattrea
- Screenplay by: Purnendu Pattrea
- Based on: Chhoto Bokulpurer Jatri by Manik Bandopadhyay
- Starring: Nimu Bhowmik; Meghnad Bhattacharya; Tarit Chowdhury; Snigdha Banerjee
- Cinematography: Pantu Nag
- Edited by: Arabinda Bhattacharya
- Distributed by: West Bengal Film Development Corporation
- Release date: 20 February 1987
- Running time: 46 minutes
- Country: India
- Language: Bengali

Chhoto Bokulpurer Jatri is a Bengali short political drama film directed by Purnendu Pattrea and produced by Government of West Bengal, based on the short story of the same name by Manik Bandopadhyay. This film was released on 20 February 1987 under the banner of West Bengal Film Development Corporation.

== Plot ==
Dibakar, a labour moves with his wife to their native village, Chhoto Bokulpur during a political unrest. A peasant uprising is going on against the state repression in the area. The couple are stopped in different phases and interrogated by police.

== Cast ==
- Kaushik Banerjee
- Meghnad Bhattacharya
- Nimu Bhowmik
- Partha Sarathi Deb
- Snigdha Banerjee
- Tarit Chowdhury
- Bablu Chakraborty
- Dipali Chakraborty
- Ashok Chatterjee
- Haradhan Chattopadhyay
- Papri Basu
