= Santu Mukherjee =

Bengali actor (1951–2020)

- Born: Ramananda Mukherjee; 13 January 1951
- Died: 11 March 2020 (aged 69)
- Other name: Santu Mukhopadhyay
- Occupation: Actor
- Spouse: Gopa Mukhopadhyay (née Mitra)
- Children: Swastika and Ajopa

Santu Mukherjee (13 January 1951 – 11 March 2020) was an Indian actor who worked in Bengali cinema. He was the father of actress Swastika Mukherjee. His younger brother, Sumanta Mukherjee, is also an actor.

== Early life and biography ==
Santu Mukherjee was born on 13 January 1951 in Kolkata. He attended the Mitra Institution at Bhowanipore at a primary level and later, joined the Padmapukur Institution at Sarat Bose Road, from where he passed his Higher Secondary Examination. He soon dropped out from studies and took dance lessons from Gopal Bhattacharya. He also learned Rabindra Sangeet.

He went to renowned director Tapan Sinha, seeking a role in Bengali films. In 1975, Sinha launched him as an actor in the film Raja. Subsequent to his cinematic breakthrough, he worked in both theater and films. His last film was Sanjhbati.

Mukherjee died on 11 March 2020 from cardiac arrest at his South Kolkata residence; he had been suffering from cancer for a long time.

== Filmography ==
Year	Film	Role	Director
1975	Sansar Simante		Tarun Majumdar
1975	Raja		Tapan Sinha
1976	Harmonium		Tapan Sinha
1976	Chander Kachhakachhi		Tarun Majumdar, Sachin Mukherjee, Dilip Mukherjee
1977	Shesh Raksha		Shankar Bhattacharya
1977	Pratishruti		Pinaki Mukherjee
1977	Pratima		Palash Bandyopadhyay
1977	Nayan		Sukhen Das
1977	Asadharan	Bimal	Salil Sen
1977	Jaal Sannyasi		Salil Sen
1978	Tusi		Guru Bagchi
1978	Striker		Archan Chakraborty
1978	Maan Abhiman		Sukhen Das
1978	Jatayu		Uttarsuri
1979	Parichoy		Nirmal Mitra
1979	Pampa		Pradip Bhattacharya
1979	Ganadevata		Tarun Majumdar
1979	Chirantan		Guru Bagchi
1979	Banabasar		Sushil Mukhopadhyay
1979	Devdas		Dilip Roy
1980	Shesh Bichar		Bimal Roy Jr.
1980	Parabesh		Kalpataru
1980	Byapika Biday		Archan Chakraborty
1980	Boro Bhai		Sushil Mukhopadhyay
1980	Bichar		Ajit Gangopadhyay
1980	Pankhiraj		Piyush Bose
1981	Swami Stree		Guru Bagchi
1981	Nyay Anyay		Sukhen Das
1981	Maa Bipattarin Chandi		Amar Bhattacharya
1981	Khana Baraha	Mihir (Baraha's Son)	Bijoy Bose
1981	Kalankini Kankabati	Raghubir	Uttam Kumar
1982	Uttar Meleni		Uday Bhattacharya
1982	Pratiksha		Bimal Roy Jr.
1982	Prafulla		Sujoy Dutta
1982	Malancha		Purnendu Patri
1982	Faisala		Raja
1982	Bodhan		Amal Dutta
1983	Utsarga		Tapan Saha
1983	Sansarer Itikatha		Aravind Mukherjee
1983	Muktir Din		Jayanta Purkayastha
1983	Jabanbondi		Pranab Bandyopadhyay
1983	Abhinoy Noy	Bhola/Bikram	Archan Chakraborty
1984	Uncle		Surajit Chowdhury
1984	Shilalipi		Palash Bandyopadhyay
1984	Lalita		Tapan Chowdhury
1984	Dadamoni		Sujit Guha
1985	Tagari		Ajit Gangopadhyay
1985	Bhalobasa Bhalobasa		Tarun Majumdar
1985	Baikunther Will		Sushil Mukhopadhyay
1986	Urbashi		Salil Dutta
1986	Prem Bandhan		Rathish Dey Sarkar
1987	Bidrohi		Anjan Choudhury
1988	Surer Sathi		Tapan Saha
1988	Punarmilan		Jayanta Bose
1988	Parashmoni		Tarun Majumdar
1989	Bandhabi		Shankar Bhattacharya
1993	Iswar Parameswar		Bablu Samaddar
1993	Garam Bhat		Dilip Roy
1994	Sandhyatara		Prabhat Roy
1995	Sujan Sakhi		Swapan Saha
1997	Samadhan		Narayan Ghosh
1998	Raja Rani Badsha		Haranath Chakraborty
1998	Putra Badhu		Pallab Ghosh
1998	Manush Manusher Janya		Niranjan Dey
1999	Tumi Ele Tai		Prabhat Roy
1999	Niyoti		Bablu Samaddar
1999	Khelaghar		Prabhat Roy
2000	Parichay		Bidesh Sarkar
2001	Suorani Duorani		Ladli Mukherjee
2001	Shesh Bichar		Sukhen Das
2003	Hemanter Pakhi		Urmi Chakraborty
2003	Arjun Aamar Naam		Prabir Nandi
2004	Waarish		Kaushik Ganguly
2004	Samudra Sakshi		Dulal Dey
2004	Dwitio Paksha		Ananya Chatterjee
2005	Agnipath		Sujit Guha
2007	Banobhumi		Swapan Ghoshal
2008	Partner	Dasu Bhattacharya	Shankar Ray
2008	Bajimaat	Subhra's father	Haranath Chakraborty
2008	90 Ghanta		
2009	Kaalbela		Goutam Ghose
2009	Dhakee		Satabdi Roy
2009	Keno Kichhu Kotha Bolo Na	Banjara Old Man	Swapan Saha
2009	Brake Fail	Nikhilesh	Kaushik Ganguly
2009	saptosur		Shankar Ray
2010	Besh Korechhi Prem Korechhi		Narayan Roy
2010	Ganyer Meye Sovona		Amit Chakraborty
2010	Target: The Final Mission	Shubhankar's father	Raja Chanda
2011	Aamio Nebo Challenge		Mastar Mosai
2012	Jaal	Rai's father	Amit Samanta
2012	E Sudhu Aamar Gaan	Rani's father	Shankar Ray
2013	Sweet Heart	Animesh (Mimi's father)	Prodip Saha
2015	Family Album	(Swastika's father)	Mainak Bhaumik
2019	Sanjhbati	Chandu's Father	Leena Gangopadhyay & Saibal Banerjee
2020	Karmachakra: Episode Zero	Professor Sid (voice)	Rajorshi Basu

== Television ==
Santu's acting reached its pinnacle when he started acting in the Television serial shows. Some of the popular shows were:

- Keya Patar Nouko
- Ishti Kutum
- Saat Paake Bandha (later replaced by Rohit Mukherjee)
- Jol Nupur
- Kojagori
- Ichche Nodee
- Kusum Dola
- Andarmahal
- Phagun Bou
- Mayurpankhi
- Nokshi Kantha
- Mohor (later replaced by Dulal Lahiri)

== Santu Mukherjee as Singer ==
Santu recorded several songs. In the Bengali movie "Parabot Priya" Santu Mukherjee sang a duet song (Rabindra Sangeet) along with co-artist Arundhati Hom Choudhury: "Amar hridoy tomar apon hater dole".

In the album "Ei akashe amar Mukti aloy aloy" he sang the title song along with his daughter Swastika. His rendition "Tumi daak diyechho kon sokale" was mesmerizing.
