= Shanka =

1993 film starring Chiranjeet

- Title card
- Directed by: Salilmoy Ghosh
- Written by: Salilmoy Ghosh
- Produced by: Ghanashyam Agarwal
- Starring: Chiranjeet Chakraborty; Rabi Ghosh; Subhendu Chatterjee; Rajeshwari Raychowdhury
- Cinematography: Shakti Banerjee
- Edited by: Snehasis Ganguly
- Music by: Shyamal Bandyopadhyay
- Release date: 1993
- Running time: 150 minutes
- Country: India
- Language: Bengali

Shanka is a 1993 Indian Bengali action film directed by Salilmoy Ghosh starring Chiranjeet, Robi Ghosh, Subhendu Chatterjee and Rajeshwari Raychowdhury. The film has musical score by Shyamal Bandyopadhyay.

== Synopsis ==
Amit Sen is an honest police officer who lives with his wife Seema. Things take a turn in their peaceful life when Seema is forced to kill Changez in self defense but unable to reveal the truth to Amit. However, Changez accidentally drops some diamonds in her house which she is unaware of. Shamsher Singh, Changez's boss, harasses her for those diamonds. In due course, Seema is arrested. The rest of the film deals with the tactics employed by Amit to nab the culprits and rescue his wife from the dark side of the law.

== Cast ==
- Chiranjeet as Amit Sen
- Rabi Ghosh
- Subhendu Chatterjee
- Rajeshwari Raychowdhury
- Sumita Sanyal
- Sunil Mukhopadhyay
- Papiya Adhikari
- Siddharth Ray
- Ratna Sarkar

== See also ==
- List of Bengali films of 1993
- Chotushkone, 2014 Bengali film directed by Srijit Mukherji
