= Ramkumar Chattopadhyay =

Indian singer, composer and music director

Ramkumar Chattopadhyay (1921 — 18 March 2009) was an eminent Bengali singer, composer and music director. He was well known as a classical singer with a unique repertoire of Puratani (old Bengali) songs, devotional songs and Tappa.

== Early life ==
Ramkumar was born in 1921 at Darjipara of North Kolkata in a family with musical background. His grandfather was a classical singer from whom Chattopadhyay learned Tabla. He took lesson on classical music from Jatin Chatterjee, a singer of Bishnupur gharana.

== Music career ==
Chattopadhyay first got an opportunity to accompany Kazi Nazrul Islam during a public meeting held by Subhash Chandra Bose in Kolkata. He learned Tappa from Kolobabu alias Jitendranath Bandopadhyay. Sarat Chandra Pandit appointed him as a regular artist of Akashbani Kolkata and after that Chattopadhyay was established as a professional singer. His unparalleled skills lay in giving humorous, quirky twists to traditional forms of music, which were appreciated by classical music lovers. He composed music in two Bengali movies named Strir Patra in 1972 and Parikrama in 1996. He gained much popularity for Shyama Sangeet and Bengali Puratani Song or Baithaki Gaan. In his career he worked as a playback singer in number of Bengali films. Chattopadhyay died at 89 due to sepsis and multi organ failure at a private hospital in Kolkata. His son, Srikumar Chattyopadhyay is also a Bengali Classical Singer. On 1 June 2017 a statue of Chattopadhyay was inaugurated in Kolkata by Mala Roy, the then Chairperson of Kolkata Municipal Corporation.
