= Shatru Pakhha =

1989 Bengali film by Nripen Saha

- Directed by: Nripen Saha
- Written by: Deb Singha
- Produced by: Haridas Saha; Nripen Saha; Tapan Saha
- Starring: Chiranjeet; Prosenjit; Satabdi Roy; Gyanesh Mukherjee; Basabi Nandi
- Cinematography: Krishna Chakraborty
- Edited by: Achintya Mukhopadhyay
- Music by: Sumit Bandopadhyay
- Production company: Saha Pictures
- Release date: 1989
- Running time: 124 minutes
- Country: India
- Language: Bengali

Shatru Pakhha is a 1989 Indian Bengali-language action thriller film directed by Nripen Saha. It stars Chiranjeet, Prosenjit and Satabdi Roy.

== Synopsis ==
This is the revenge story of two brothers whose father was killed by a local don. After a long time, the brothers find out the killer who murdered their honest journalist father.

== Cast ==
- Chiranjeet
- Prosenjit
- Satabdi Roy
- Gyanesh Mukherjee
- Manoj Mitra
- Basabi Nandi
- Rajeshwari Raychowdhury
- Deb Singha
- Master Ritwit
