= Haraner Nat Jamai =

- Directed by: Pranab Chowdhury
- Screenplay by: Samiran Dutta
- Story by: Manik Bandopadhyay
- Produced by: Kartik Paik
- Cinematography: Pradip Chakraborty
- Edited by: Rathish Saha; Ratan Sarkar
- Music by: Salil Chowdhury
- Release date: 27 December 1990
- Running time: 119 minutes
- Country: India
- Language: Bengali

Haraner Nat Jamai is an Indian Bengali-language drama film directed by Pranab Chowdhury and produced by Kartik Paik based on a same name short story of Manik Bandopadhyay. The film stars Soumitra Chatterjee, Abhishek Chatterjee, Sumitra Mukherjee and Anil Chatterjee in lead roles. The music was composed by Salil Chowdhury.

== Plot ==
The plot is set on the backdrop of the Tebhaga movement in rural Bengal. A political activist takes shelter, at Shaliganj village in the house of widow Behula and her daughter Moina. When police come to search the house, Behula identifies the activist as her son-in-law. It results misunderstandings for the villagers.

== Cast ==
- Soumitra Chatterjee
- Abhishek Chatterjee
- Sumitra Mukherjee
- Anil Chatterjee
- Shobha Sen
- Nimu Bhowmik
- Chitra Sen
- Sunil Mukherjee
- Niranjan Ray
- Nripen Ganguly
- Ajit Lahiri
- Sumanta Mukherjee
- Subrata Sensharma
- Ajoy Banerjee
- Bhola Bose
