= Nilkantha Sengupta =

- নীলকণ্ঠ সেনগুপ্ত
- Born: 31 October 1946; Faridpur District, Bengal, British India
- Died: 1 June 2010 (aged 63); Kolkata, West Bengal, India
- Occupations: Actor; playwright; theatre director; organiser
- Spouse: Kajal Sengupta (m.1988)
- Children: Kanchanmala Sengupta
- Awards: Eminent Director's Award (1989)

Nilkantha Sengupta (31 October 1946 - 1 June 2010) was an Indian Bengali actor, theatre director and playwright. He was known as an all-time dramatist and mainly acted for Bengali films and dramas. Sengupta received the best Actor Award from the Information and Culture Department of the West Bengal Government in 1988 and the Eminent Director's Award from Paschimbanga Natya Akademi in 1989.

== Biography ==
Nilakantha Sengupta was born in Kotalipara of Faridpur (now Gopalganj District during British India. Nilkantha was the fifth son of his parents and very talented but immersed in the study of drama. Leaving the carefree confines of government jobs, he started a new chapter in the world of Bengali theatre.

Sengupta formed a Bengali theatre group in Kolkata, named, "Theatre Commune," on 1 July 1972 . Its first drama Bibhur Bag based on 'Tiger' of William Saroyan. It was staged on 9 October at Rangana. Within a short period of time, it became a popular theatre group in Kolkata. On 23rd November 1974, under the direction of Nilakantha Sengupta, Mohit Chatterjee's drama - 'Swadeshi Naksa' was staged in 1985.

As a playwright, Sengupta was influenced by works- Dante’s Divine Comedy, Plutarch’s lives, F.R. Cowell’s 'Cicero and the Roman Republic' and Shakespeare’s Julius Caesar. He wrote several plays. Among them, the famous 'Julius Caesar's Last Seven Days', in 1983 (Julius Caesar Shesh Saath Din) was an adaption from a short story of Brecht titled "Caesar und Sein Legioner" (1947) The others are 'The Next Air Attack' (parabarti biman akrama - পরবর্তী বিমান আক্রমণ), 'Look Up' (uparer dike takan - উপরের দিকে তাকান), 'Daansagar', 'Sadhabar Ekadashi' etc. are notable.

== Filmography ==
=== As actor ===
Year	Title	Role	Notes
1974	Chhera Tamsuk		
1978	Ganadevata		as Tarini, the singer
1979	"Parashuram"		
1980	Mayna Tadanta		
1982	Akaler Shandhaney		
1983	Mouchor		
1984	Ananya Amar		
1986	"Pathbhola"		
1987	Bandookbaj		
1999	Kahini		

== Personal life and death ==
In 1988, Sengupta married Kajal Sengupta, also an actress, his worthy disciple. In 2010, Sengupta passed away, leaving behind his wife Kajal and only daughter Kanchalmala.
