= Kabita Sinha =

Indian poet and novelist

- Kabita Sinha
- Born: 16 October 1931; Calcutta, Bengal Presidency, British India
- Died: 15 October 1998 (aged 67); Boston, United States of America
- Other names: Sultana Choudhury
- Education: Bachelor of Science
- Alma mater: Beltala Girls' High School; Presidency College, Kolkata; Jogamaya Devi College
- Occupations: Poet, novelist, radio director
- Known for: Feminist writings, Dissidence movement
- Spouse: Bimal Raychowdhury (m. 1951; died 1976)
- Children: 3 (including Rajeshwari Raychowdhury)

Kabita Sinha (1931–1998) was a Bengali poet, novelist, feminist and radio director. She is noted for her modernist stance, rejecting the traditional housebound role for Bengali women, a theme echoed later in the work of other poets including Mallika Sengupta and Taslima Nasrin.

== Life ==
Kabita Sinha was born on 16 October 1931 to Shailendra Sinha and Annapurna Sinha in Kolkata. She started writing as a child. In 1951, while a student of botany at the Presidency College, Calcutta, she married author and editor Bimal Roy Choudhury, against the wishes of her family. A rebellious spirit, she was involved in dissidence movements in the 1950s. She was the prime force in addressing women's dissident at a time when Nehruvian politics was taking hold of the country.

In the process, she never finished her bachelor's degree — this she would complete many years later, from Asutosh College. She worked for some years as a schoolteacher before joining the West Bengal government as an editor. In 1965, she joined All India Radio, and at one point she was the station director at Darbhanga, Bihar. In 1966, she started the poetry magazine Dainik Kabita with her husband. Kabita was a supporter of the Bangladesh Liberation War. She would narrate the news of the war proceedings over the radio.

In 1981, she was invited to the Iowa International Writers' Workshop.

In the 1980s she launched a number of programs involving the youth in All India Radio.

She died on 17 October 1998, at her youngest daughter Parameshwari Roy Choudhury's residence in Boston, US.

== Literary career ==
Kabita Sinha has been recognized as the first feminist poet of Bengali literature. Although primarily known for her poetry, she first entered Bengali literature as a novelist. Her first novel, Charjon Raagi Juubati (Four Angry Young Women) was published in 1956. This was followed by Ekti Kharap Meyer Golpo (Story of a Bad Girl, 1958), and Nayikaa Pratinayikaa (Heroine, Anti-heroine, 1960).

In the meantime, she was also writing poetry in various magazines, but her first volume of poetry, Sahaj Sundari (Easy Beauty), was published only in 1965. The 1976 collection Kabita Paramesvwari (Poetry Goddess) became particularly well known.

Many of her poems address the woman's place vis-a-vis man in poems like "Ajiban Pathor Protima" (Stone Goddess Forever), "Iswarke Eve" (Eve Speaks to God), or "Opomaaner Jonyo Firey Ashi" (Returning for Insults).

Other collections include Harina Bairi (Enemy Deer, 1985), and her Shreshta Kabita (Selected Poems), which came out in 1987.

A novel on eunuchs, Paurush (lit. "manliness", English title: The Third Sex, 1984), won the Nathmal Bhualka award in 1986.

In total, she published nearly fifty books, including some under the pen name Sultana Choudhury. She has been anthologized in a wide range of poetry collections, and has also been widely translated.

== Books ==
Novels

- Charjon Ragi Juboti (Four Angry Young Women) 1956
- Ekti Kharap Meyer Golpo (Tale of a Bad Woman) 1958
- Nayikaa Protinayikaa (Heroine anti-heroine) 1960
- Paurush (Manliness. Translated as The Third Sex) 1984

Poems

- Sahaj Sundari (Simple Beauty) 1965
- Kabita Parameshwari (Poetry is the Great Goddess) 1976
- Momer Taj Mahal (The Wax Taj Mahal)
- Harinabairee 1965
- Bimal Hawyaar Haat Dhore.
