= Lalita (1984 film) =

1984 film directed by Tapan Chowdhury

- Directed by: Tapan Chowdhury
- Music by: Manna Dey
- Distributed by: Sujata Films
- Release date: 1984
- Country: India
- Language: Bengali

Lalita is a 1984 Indian Bengali film directed by Tapan Chowdhury.

== Plot ==
Lalita is the story of a bright young Lalita who is raped by her university friend Saibal.

== Cast ==
- Dipankar Dey
- Santosh Dutta
- Santu Mukhopadhyay
- Tarun Kumar
- Subrata Chattopadhyay
- Padma Devi
- Sumitra Mukherjee
- Pradip Mukhopadhyay
- Satya Bandyopadhyay
- Sibani Bose
