= Raktha Tilakam =

- Theatrical release poster
- Directed by: B. Gopal
- Written by: Paruchuri Brothers (story / dialogues); Appalacharya (comedy)
- Screenplay by: B. Gopal
- Produced by: K. Ashok Kumar
- Starring: Venkatesh; Amala
- Cinematography: S. Gopal Reddy
- Edited by: K. A. Marthand
- Music by: Chakravarthy
- Production company: Sri Usha Art Productions
- Distributed by: Suresh Productions
- Release date: 14 January 1988
- Running time: 135 mins
- Country: India
- Language: Telugu

Raktha Tilakam (transl. Blood Tilaka) is a 1988 Indian Telugu-language action film directed by B. Gopal and produced by K. Ashok Kumar under the Sri Usha Art Productions banner. It stars Venkatesh and Amala, with music composed by Chakravarthy. The film was a remake of the Bengali film Pratikaar (1987). The film was recorded as a hit at the box office.

== Plot ==
Krishna Prasad is a son of a rich man, Satyanarayana Prasad (Jaggayya); in his childhood, his father's younger brother Garupmantha Rao (Nutan Prasad) kills his brother for the property and Krishna Prasad is driven out of the house. Krishna Prasad goes to live with his school-teacher Nagamani (Sharada), whom he treats as his own mother, she has two children, Balaram and Jyoti, of her own. Garupmantha Rao tries to kill Krishna also, but unfortunately Balaram is separated from his family, and is assumed dead. Nagamani looks after Krishna and Jyoti. After 20 years, Krishna Prasad (Venkatesh) falls in love with his college friend Radha (Amala). Raghu (Sudhakar), son of Garupmantha Rao becomes a local goon, protected by his dad by bribing the local police Inspector P.K. Pathi (Giri Babu). Jyoti (Poornima) is raped and murdered by Raghu and his pals, and they also run over Nagamani, rendering her crippled. Both Krishna and Nagamani swear to avenge Jyoti's death. Then Balaram (Siva Krishna) re-enters their lives, as a police inspector, and is bent on arresting Krishna by hook or by crook, casting doubts whether he is or not on the payroll.

== Cast ==
- Venkatesh as Krishna Prasad
- Amala as Radha
- D. Ramanaidu as himself
- Sharada as Nagamani
- Nutan Prasad as Garupmantha Rao
- Jaggayya as Satyanarayana Prasad
- Siva Krishna as Inspector Balaram
- Giri Babu as Inspector P.K. Pathi
- Sudhakar as Raghu
- Rallapalli as Hrundeswara Rao
- P. L. Narayana as Basavaiah
- Suthi Velu as Hapil Satry
- Chalapathi Rao as Pandu
- Pradeep Shakthi as Dasu
- Raj Varma as Raju
- Vankayala Satyanarayana
- Bheemiswara Rao as Judge
- KK Sarma as Rangaiah
- Ramana Reddy as Ramana
- Gundu Hanumantha Rao as Watchman
- Juttu Narasimham
- Pournima as Jyothi
- Rama Prabha as Hrundeswara Rao's wife
- Srilakshmi as Banthi Kumari
- Sudha as Rekha
- Nirmalamma as Basavamma

== Soundtrack ==
Raktha Tilakam

Film score by Chakravarthy
- Released: 1988
- Genre: Soundtrack
- Length: 22:11
- Label: Saptaswar Audio
- Producer: Chakravarthy

Chakravarthy chronology
Vijetha Vikram (1987)	Raktha Tilakam (1988)	Brahma Putrudu (1988)

Music composed by Chakravarthy. Music released on SAPTASWAR Audio Company.

S. No.	Song title	Singers	lyrics	length
1	"Dhancho Dhancho"	S. P. Balasubrahmanyam, P. Susheela	Veturi	4:33
2	"Thamalapaku Lantidhana"	S. P. Balasubrahmanyam, P. Susheela	Veturi	4:29
3	"College Nundi Marriage"	S. P. Balasubrahmanyam	Jonnavithhula Ramalingeswara Rao	4:19
4	"Guppedu Mallelu"	Mano, Alisha Chinoy	Jonnavithhula Ramalingeswara Rao	4:29
5	"Kill Kill Me"	Alisha Chinoy	Jaladhi	4:21
