= Nimu Bhowmik =

Indian actor (1935–2019)

- Born: 14 November 1935; Dinajpur, Bengal Presidency, British India
- Died: 27 August 2019 (aged 83); Calcutta, West Bengal, India
- Occupations: Actor, politician
- Years active: 1966–2019
- Children: 1

Nimu Bhowmik (Bengali: নিমু ভৌমিক; 14 November 1935 – 27 August 2019) was an Indian actor recognized for his work in Bengali cinema. and considered to be one of the famous comic actors and villains of Bengali Cinema.

== Career ==
His debut film Bagha Jatin was released in 1958 and second important film Monihar was released in 1966. He acted in about 60 films portraying the role of a typical Bengali man and was acclaimed by viewers for his natural acting skill. He portrayed characters of different shades in 'Ganadebata' (1979), 'Baghini' (1968), 'Dadar Kirti' (1980), 'Guru Dakshina' (1987). He was a favourite actor of director Tarun Majumder. His last film was 'Dos Mas Dos Diner Golpo' released in the year 2019. Nimu Bhowmick directed a movie named 'Protyaborton'.

== Political career ==
He joined the BJP and unsuccessfully contested Lok Sabha election from Raiganj constituency in 2014.

== Filmography ==
- Bagha Jatin (1958)
- Monihaar (1966)
- Baghini (1968)
- Dui Prithibi (1970)
- Strir Patra (1972)
- Chhera Tamsuk (1974)
- Bikele Bhorer Phul (1974)
- Gonodevta (1978)
- Dadar Kirti (1980)
- Saheb (1981)
- Guru Dakshina (1987)
- Chhoto Bokulpurer Jatri (1987)
- Chhoto Bou (1988)
- Pratik (1988)
- Mangal Deep (1989)
- Haraner Nat Jamai (1990)
- Sinthir Sindoor (1996)
- Aporajita (1998)
- Nodir Pare Amer Bari (2001)
- Pratibad (2001)
- Sathi (2002)
- Sangee (2003)
- Nater Guru (2003)
- Tulkalam (2007)
- Keka (2008; Telugu)
- Ekti Muhurter Jonyo (2014)
- Achena Bondhutto (2015)
- Protyaborton (2015)
- Nabab (2017)
- Dos Mas Dos Diner Golpo (2019)
- Khuda (2019)
