= Abhijit Bhattacharya =

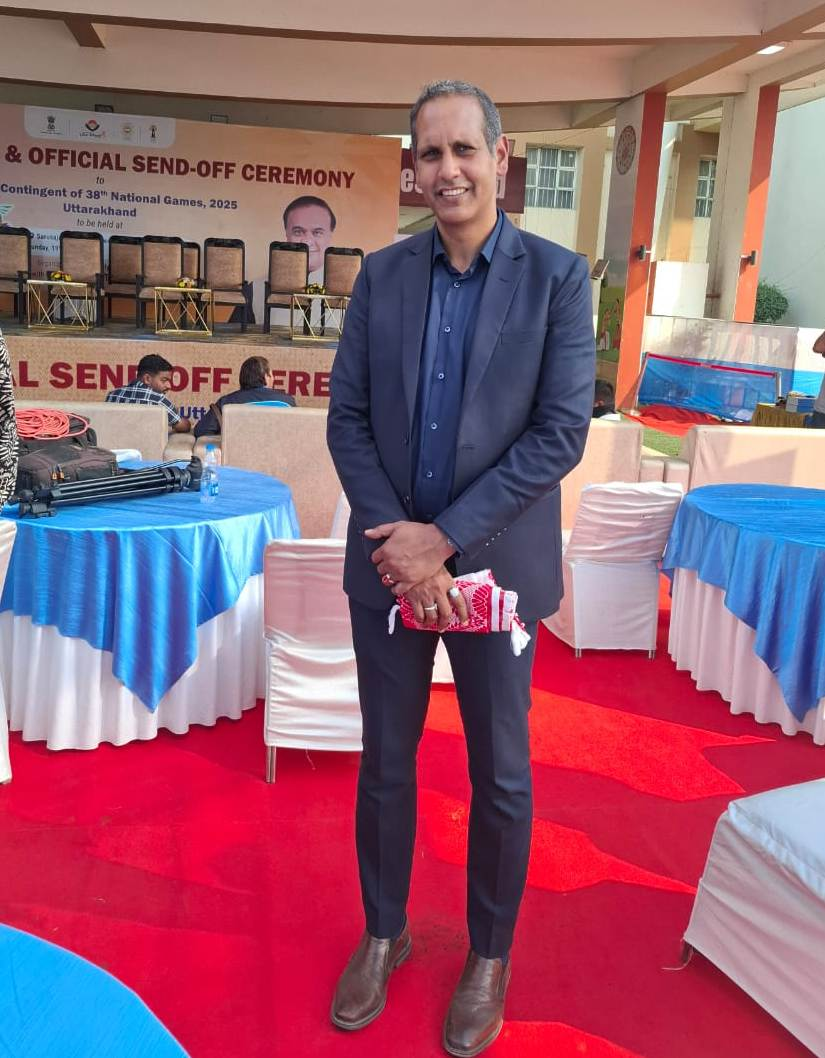
Abhijit Bhattacharya in Guwahati

Abhijit Bhattacharya is a former Indian volleyball player who captained the national team and played a crucial role in popularizing the sport in the country. Hailing from Assam, he was known for his exceptional skills as a player and his leadership on the court. During his playing career, he represented India in multiple international tournaments, including the Asian Volleyball Championship and the South Asian Games, where he contributed significantly to the team's success. His commitment to the game and his strategic approach made him one of India's most respected volleyball players of his time.

== Brahmaputra Volleyball League ==
Beyond his playing career, Bhattacharya has been actively involved in the promotion and development of volleyball in India. He has worked as a mentor and coach, training young athletes and helping shape the future of Indian volleyball. His contributions extend to administrative roles as well, where he has been instrumental in advocating for better infrastructure and support for the sport. Through various initiatives, he has played a key role in raising awareness about volleyball and encouraging more participation at the grassroots level.

One of Bhattacharya's most notable contributions to Indian volleyball is the Brahmaputra Volleyball League (BVL), an initiative he launched to nurture young talent in Assam and the Northeast. The league focuses on providing a structured platform for rural and grassroots-level players to develop their skills and gain competitive experience. Since its inception, BVL has grown into a significant movement, helping to revive volleyball in the region and inspire a new generation of players. His efforts through the league have strengthened the sport's foundation in Assam, making volleyball more accessible and popular among young athletes.
