= Thaimel Aanai =

- DVD cover
- Directed by: L. Raja
- Screenplay by: Karaikudi Narayanan
- Story by: Prabhat Roy
- Produced by: M. Saravanan; M. Balasubramanian; M. S. Guhan
- Starring: Arjun; Saroja Devi; Raghuvaran; Ranjini
- Cinematography: K. S. Selvaraj
- Edited by: R. Vittal; S. B. Mohan
- Music by: Chandrabose
- Production company: AVM Productions
- Distributed by: Anandha
- Release date: 13 April 1988
- Country: India
- Language: Tamil

Thaimel Aanai (transl. Mother's order) is a 1988 Indian Tamil-language action film, directed by L. Raja and produced by AVM Productions. The film stars Arjun and Raghuvaran. It was released on 13 April 1988. This film was dubbed in Telugu as Kondaveeti Siva. The film is a remake of Bengali film Pratikaar (1987). Before the film's release, Rajinikanth made a special appearance regarding eye donation and its awareness.

== Plot ==
Thaimel Aanai is the story of a son's revenge on the killers of his mother and sister, but his friend, who is now a police officer, does not like someone taking the law into his hands. The villains kidnap Vinod's family. Raja storms the hideout of the villains along with Vinod and rescues Vinod's family by fighting with the villains, killing the goons who destroyed his family in the process. But Raja succumbs to the injuries he received during the fight. The film ends with Vinod carrying the corpse of Raja and walking away along with his family.

== Cast ==
- Arjun as Raja
- Raghuvaran as Vinod
- Saroja Devi as Vijaya and Raja's mother
- Ranjini as Meena
- Madhuri as Vinod's wife
- Vani Viswanath as Vijaya
- C. L. Anandan
- Kishmu as Chakkara
- Jai Ganesh as Devaraj
- Y. Gee. Mahendra as Punyakodi
- Senthil as a fisherman of Rangukuppam
- S. S. Chandran as Picha
- K. K. Soundar as Padma's father
- Babitha as Padma
- Idichapuli Selvaraj as Kannaiyya
- Kumarimuthu as a fisherman of Rangukuppam
- Omakuchi Narasimhan as a director
- Bayilvan Ranganathan as Chakkara's henchman
- Kullamani as a fisherman of Rangukuppam
- Thavakalai as a fisherman of Rangukuppam
- Anandaraj as Johny
- Azhagu as Dhilip
- Naveen as Chakkara's henchman
- Master Meenuraj as Babu
- Master Jai Krishna as young Raja
- Master Biju as young Vinod
- Baby Vijaya as young Vijaya

== Production ==
The film was launched at AVM Studios. The scenes of Arjun, Ranjini, Raghuvaran and Madhuri were shot on first day.

== Soundtrack ==
The soundtrack consist of nine songs composed by Chandrabose. Among which 2 unpublished works at the time of the release of the soundtrack, "Chinna Kanna Chella Kanna", S. P. Balasubrahmanyam's version and K. S. Chitra's sad version (or slow version). Lyrics were written by Vairamuthu.

Tamil Tracklist

Song	Singers	Length (min:sec)
"Vaaika Varabukulla Vayasupulla"	Malaysia Vasudevan, Vani Jairam and Chorus	04:43
"Chinna Kanna Chella Kanna"	K. S. Chitra	04:24
"Sangu Chakra Sami Vanthu"	Malaysia Vasudevan, S. P. Sailaja and Chorus	04:55
"Poona Poora Vittitu Avana"	Malaysia Vasudevan, S. P. Sailaja and Chorus	04:24
"Hey Mallikai Poo Poothirukku"	S. P. Balasubrahmanyam, S. Janaki and Chorus	04:06
"Yentha Kadai Solla"	K. J. Yesudas, S. P. Balasubrahmanyam and M. S. Rajeswari	04:16
"Poona Poora Vittitu Avana" (Reprise)	Malaysia Vasudevan, S. P. Sailaja and Chorus	04:24
"Chinna Kanna Chella Kanna"	K. J. Yesudas	03:46
"Chinna Kanna Chella Kanna"	S. P. Balasubrahmanyam	04:24
"Chinna Kanna Chella Kanna" (Sad)	K. S. Chitra	04:14

== Reception ==
The Indian Express wrote, "Like a merry-go-round the film keeps spinning about in a whirl all geared to one end of satisfying the audience in an entertainment made-to-order exercise".
