= Rajeshwari Raychowdhury =

Indian actress

- Raychowdhury in 1987
- Born: 1952; Bhowanipore, Kolkata, West Bengal, India
- Died: 1994 (aged 41–42); Kolkata, West Bengal
- Citizenship: Indian
- Education: Beltala Girls' High School; Jogamaya Devi College
- Occupation: Actress
- Years active: 1973, 1979—1994
- Children: 3
- Parents: Bimal Raychowdhury (father); Kabita Sinha (mother)

Rajeshwari Raychowdhury (1952—1994) was an Indian actress who is recognized for her work in Bengali cinema. The daughter of the eminent faminist writer Kabita Sinha, she made her big screen debut in Purnendu Patri's Strir Patra (1973) which was based on Rabindranath Tagore's short story of the same name. Afterwards, she appeared in films such as Job Charnaker Bibi (1979), Sansarer Itikatha (1983), Rajpurush (1987), Dolonchanpa (1987), Devi Baran (1988), Shatru Pakhha (1989). Her relationship with Abhishek Chatterjee attracted significant media attention.

== Early life ==
Rajeshwari was born in 1952, to the Bengali Writer Bimal Raychowdhury and the Bengali poet Kabita Sinha. Parameshwari Raychowdhury and Konad Raychowdhury are her younger siblings. The eloped couple had to work very hard to make both ends meet as aspiring writers and poets

== Career ==
Raychowdhury made her debut in Purnendu Patri's Strir Patra (1973) which was based on Rabindranath Tagore's short story of the same name. The film well documents the subjugated and dominated womanhood of the 20th century Indian society. It stars Madhabi Mukherjee in the lead. Rajeshwari portrayed Bindu, a teenage girl who is sheltered by the in-laws of her elder sister. Bindu is considered a burden in the family and is compelled to overwork throughout the entire day. The only person who is kind to her is Mrinal played by Mukherjee. Bindu later marries an insane person and kills herself to end the oppression by her in-laws. Upon release, the film won critical favour.

Rajeshwari took a six-year sabbatical to complete her education and returned to silver screen with Job Charnaker Bibi (1979) based on Pratap Chandra Chunder's novel of the same name. The film starred Soumitra Chatterjee as Job Charnock while she portrayed the role of Leela, Charnock's wife. She performed in the lead opposite Tapas Paul in the drama Rupasi. She featured in Sujit Guha's love-triangle Dolanchanpa (1987) alongside Sandhya Roy and Ranjit Mallick.

== Personal life ==
Rajeshwari had two daughters, Monoshini Gordon and Priyadarshini Mitra, and a son, Abhishek Mitra. In the late 1980s, she was rumored to have left her husband and settled with Abhishek Chatterjee in his apartment in South Kolkata. Her alleged relationship with Chatterjee was widely speculated about in the media. The speculation appears to have been associated, in part, with Rajeshwari and Chatterjee having worked together in their first film, Jeevan Pradip (the title is incorrectly spelled on Abhishek Chatterjee's Wikipedia page). However, the reported romantic relationship between Rajeshwari and Chatterjee did not take place. Rajeshwari had left her marital home for personal reasons unrelated to Chatterjee and did not leave her husband to begin a relationship with him. She remained with her husband, who was her lifelong partner until the end of her life.

== Death ==
After her separation from Abhishek Chatterjee, Raychowdhury turned alcoholic and eventually developed cirrhosis. In 1994, she died of Hepatitis B in Kolkata.

== Filmography ==
Year	Title	Role	Ref.
1973	Strir Patra	Bindu	
1979	Job Charnocker Bibi	Leela	
1983	Sansarer Itikatha		
1983	Utsarga		
1984	Rashiphal		
1984	Uncle		
1986	Abhishap		
1986	Anurager Choya		
1986	Daktar Bou		
1986	Dui Adhyay		
1986	Shyam Saheb		
1986	Tin Purush		
1986	Urbashi		
1987	Dabar Chal		
1987	Dolan Chanpa	Dolan	
1988	Aghat		
1988	Devibaran	Lalita	
1988	Deepsikha		
1988	Parashmoni		
1989	Asha		
1989	Jhankar		
1989	Shatru Pakhha		
1989	Srimati Hangsaraj		
1990	Bhanga-Gara		
1990	Chakranta		
1990	Garmil		
1990	Nyaydanda		
1991	Jiban Pradip		
1991	Prem Pujari		
1991	Rajnartaki		
1991	Shubho Kamana		
1992	Ananya		
1992	Krodhi		
1993	Krantikal		
1993	Shakti		
1993	Shanka		
1994	Mahabharati		
1995	Jiban Yuddha		
1995	Mashal		
1996	Sinthir Sindur		
1997	Sarbajaya		
1997	Jiban Sandhan		

== Bibliography ==
- Biswas, Krishnakali (1991). A Nagarir Nari Katha. Firma K L M Private Limited.
- Sur, Ansu (1999). Bengali Film Directory.
