= Ratna Ghoshal =

Indian Bengali actress

- Born: Bengal Presidency, British India
- Occupations: Actress; producer; director
- Years active: 1962–present
- Spouse: Sushil Das (m. 1989)
- Parents: Gopal Chandra Ghoshal (father); Ashalata Ghoshal (mother)
- Relatives: Shankar Ghoshal (brother) (Note: Shankar Ghoshal is an Indian actor who is known for his work in Bengali cinema and television.)

Ratna Ghoshal is an Indian actress, producer and director who is known for her work in Bengali cinema, television and theatre. In 1962, she began her career as a thespian actress in the celebrated Bengali play Sajahan penned by Dwijendralal Ray. She made her big screen debut in Bijoy Bose's Bengali drama film Raja Rammohun (1965) starring Basanta Chowdhury in the lead. She played the female lead in Panna Heere Chuni (1969). She was the director of the Bengali TV series Sare Saat Gondar Jomidaar. She was the producer of the popular Bengali TV series Rong Berong (1988) directed by Bimal Bhowmik.

== Career ==
Raja Rammohun directed by Bijoy Bose in 1965 was her debut film. Before starring in the lead roles, she acted in the supporting roles for 1967 films Devi Tirtha Kamrup Kamakhya and Kedar Raja. She played her first lead role in the film Panna Hire Chunni in 1969. She is also active in performing at Bengali theatres and has worked with Soumitra Chatterjee and others.

== Filmography ==
- Raja Rammohun (1965)
- Panna Hire Chunni (1969)
- Achena Atithi (1973)
- Mouchak (1974)
- Swayamsiddha (1975)
- Ghatkali (1979)
- Dena Paona (1988)
- Chhoto Bou (1988)
- Chandaneer (1989)
- Sati (1989)
- Hirak Jayanti (1990)
- Refugee (2006)
- Jekhane Ashroy (2009)
- Maha Sati Sabitri (2009)
- Ajob Prem Ebong (2011)
- Bhalobasar Golpo (2013)
- Meye/Manush (2018)

== Television ==
Year	Title	Role	Channel	Language	Notes	Ref.
1988	Rong Berong			Bengali	Producer	
	Sare Saat Gondar Jonidaar			Bengali	Director	
	Grohon			Bengali		
2007–2010	Raja & Gaja	Raja's Mother	Zee Bangla	Bengali		
2011–2013	Tapur Tupur	Ganesh's mother	Star Jalsha	Bengali		
2011–2013	Sansaar Sukher Hoy Romonir Gune	Gopi's mother	Star Jalsha	Bengali		
2012	Checkmate	Sneholota Sinha Roy	Star Jalsha	Bengali		
2013 - 2014	Kache Aye Shoi	Shoi's grandmother	Zee Bangla	Bengali		
2013 - 2015	Boyei Gelo	Ashalata Sengupta	Zee Bangla	Bengali		
2013 - 2017	Bodhuboron	Pishi thamma	Star Jalsha	Bengali		
2015 - 2016	Goyenda Ginni	Ditipriya Mitra	Zee Bangla	Bengali		
2017	Jai Kali Kalkattawali	Pishi thamma	Star Jalsha	Bengali		
2018 - 2020	Hriday Haran B.A Pass	Pekhom's grandmother	Zee Bangla	Bengali		
2019 - 2020	Kanak Kakon		Colors Bangla	Bengali		
2020 - 2022	Khorkuto	Nonibala Mukherjee	Star Jalsha	Bengali		
2020	Trinayani	Suhasini Lahiri	Zee Bangla	Bengali		
2021 - 2022	Dhulokona	Ruprekha Dasgupta	Star Jalsha	Bengali		
2022 - 2023	Lokkhi Kakima Superstar	Parulbala Das	Zee Bangla	Bengali		
2022 - 2023	Bangla Medium	Basanti Chatterjee	Star Jalsha	Bengali		

== Awards ==
Year	Award	Category	TV seies	Ref.
2016	Zee Bangla Sonar Sansar 2016	Favourite Mother-in-law	Goyenda Ginni	
2022	West Bengal Tele Academy Awards	Best Pair Elderly (female)	Khorkuto	
