= Sumitra Mukherjee =

Indian Bengali actress

Sumitra Mukherjee (30 March 1949 – 21 May 2003) was an Indian Bengali actress who was recognized for her work in Bengali cinema. Her on-screen pairings with actors such as Ranjit Mallick, Uttam Kumar, Soumitra Chatterjee, Santu Mukhopadhyay and Dipankar Dey were popular.

== Career ==
Dipankar De praised her for the "recognisable urbaneness of her acting".

== Death ==
She died at the age of 54 on 21 May 2003.

== Filmography ==
- Memsaheb (1972)
- Ajker Nayak (1972)
- Basanta Bilap (1973) as Nabonita as Nita
- Sangini (1974)
- Chhera Tamsuk (1974)
- Bikele Bhorer Phul (1974) as Tuku
- Agniswar (1975)
- Devi choudhurani (1975) as Sagar
- Sudur Niharika (1976)
- Datta (1976) as Nalini
- Ek Je Chhilo Desh (1977)
- Nayan (1977)
- Pratima (1977)
- Shesh Raksha (1977)
- Maan Abhiman (1978)
- Bansari (1978)
- Tusi (1978)
- Debdas (1979) as Paro
- Chirantan (1979)
- Ganadebata (1979)
- Parichoy (1979)
- Jharh (1979)
- Samadhan (1979)
- Nabadiganta (1979)
- Srikanter Will (1979)
- Shesh Bichar (1980)
- Aro Ekjan (1980)
- Rajnandini (1980)
- Baishakhi Megh (1981)
- Nyay Anyay (1981)
- Swami-Stree (1981)
- Ogo Bodhu Shundori (1981) as Chitra
- Bodhan (1982)
- Malancha (1982)
- Prafulla (1982)
- Uttar Meleni (1982)
- Abhinoy Noy (1983)
- Arpita (1983)
- Jeeban Maran (1983)
- Agradani (1983)
- Sansarer Itikatha (1983)
- Mohanar Dike (1983) as Paroma
- Dadamoni (1984)
- Agni Shuddhi (1984)
- Lalita (1984) as lalita
- Baikunther Will (1985)
- Bhalobasa Bhalobasa (1985)
- Soner Sansar (1985)
- Urbashi (1986)
- Anweshan (1986)
- Samrat O Sundari (1987)
- Nadia nagar (1987)
- Pranami Tomay (1989)
- Aparanher Alo (1989)
- Nishi Trishna (1989)
- Haraner Nat Jamai (1990)
- Ekhane amer swarga (1990)
- Katha Dilam (1991)
- Adhikar (1992)
- Sandhyatara (1994)
- Bhalobasar Ashroy (1994)
- Abbajan (1994)
- Noti Binodini (1994)
- Ami o maa (1994)
- Shesh Pratiksha (1995)
- Mohini (1995)
- Mejo bou (1996)
- Saptami (1997)
- Pratirodh (1998)
- Satyam Shivam Sundaram (1999)
- Jabab Dihi(1999)
- Paromitar Ekdin (2000)
- Ek Akasher Niche(2000)
- Shesh Bichar (2001)
- Har Jeet (2002)
- Sathi (2002)
- Aabaidha(2002)
- Songee (2003)
- Tista Parer Kanya (2004)
- Sarisrip (2004)
- Agnibalaka (2006)
- Gudly (2010)
- Nandan
- Ses Bichar
- Bhorer kuasha
- Prativa
- Kalpurush
- Kopalkundala
- Priyotama
- Samadhan
- Noukadubi
- Tilottama
- Dak diye jai
- Moyna
- Sondhyar rag
- Ei prithibir panthya nibas
- Montromugdha
- Rag anurag
- Chhenra tamsukh
- Prachur
- Bansari
- Satma
- Rajnandini
- Megh bristi
- Ojnatobas
- Tusher tirtho Amarnath
- Aro ekjon
- Subarnalata
- Putulghor
- Tiger 86
- Tin purush (1986)
