= Strir Patra =

- Directed by: Purnendu Patri
- Screenplay by: Purnendu Patri
- Story by: Rabindranath Tagore
- Produced by: Dhrupadi
- Starring: Madhabi Mukherjee; Rajeshwari Raychowdhury; Smita Sinha
- Cinematography: Shakti Banerjee
- Music by: Ramkumar Chatterjee
- Release date: 1972
- Running time: 98 minutes
- Country: India
- Language: Bengali

Strir Patra (also spelled as Streer Patra; English: A Wife's Letter) is a 1972 Bengali film, directed by Purnendu Patri, based on a short story by Rabindranath Tagore. Madhabi Mukherjee plays the lead role. Tagore's story, first published in 1914, has been considered to be a path-breaking feminist text. The film won the National Film Award for Best Feature Film in Bengali, as well as a number of BFJA Awards.

== Plot ==
Tagore's story is written in epistolary form - the letter from the wife forms the entire text. The film uses the letter as a frame for the narrative. It tells the story of Mrinal (Madhabi Mukherjee), a young woman from a poor family, married into an aristocratic joint family of Calcutta. She is chosen as a bride because of her beauty. However, it is her intelligence that turns out to be the key factor in the story. Women in the family lead a life that is confined to the kitchen and the bedroom. Mrinal's sister-in-law (Smita Sinha) accepts the system unquestioningly. Mrinal is different; she takes an independent stance on several domestic matters, and secretly writes poetry. Her daughter dies soon after birth. Mrinal's life changes when Bindu (Rajeshwari Roychowdhury), her sister-in-law's sister, comes to stay. The family is not happy at this development. They treat Bindu like an unpaid servant, with Mrinal alone standing up for her. To get rid of the problem, the men force Bindu into an arranged marriage, and even her sister considers this to be the best solution. However, Bindu's husband (Nimu Bhowmick) turns out to be mentally unstable and violent. Once again, Bindu seeks shelter with her sister. Now, however, the situation has become untenable, and Bindu commits suicide. Meanwhile, Mrinal has managed to get permission to go on a pilgrimage to Puri with relatives. Through these tragic events, she has come to realise that women have no freedom in a patriarchal society. Standing on the seashore at Puri, she makes up her mind, and writes a letter to her husband declaring that she would never return to their house.

== Cast ==
- Madhabi Mukherjee as Mrinal
- Rajeshwari Raychowdhury as Bindu
- Nimu Bhowmick as Bindu's husband
- Santosh Dutta as the doctor
- Asim Chakraborty
- Smita Sinha as Mrinal's sister-in-law
- Rudraprasad Sengupta
- Ayan Bandyopadhyay

== Crew ==
- Direction - Purnendu Patri
- Screenplay - Purnendu Patri
- Music - Ramkumar Chatterjee
- Cinematography - Shakti Banerjee
- Art direction - Purnendu Patri
- Editing - Arabinda Bhattacharyya

== Production ==
=== Casting ===
The choice of Madhabi Mukherjee to play the lead role was perhaps automatic, given her stellar performance as a Tagore heroine in Satyajit Ray's Charulata. Apart from her and Santosh Dutta, who were well-known in Bengali cinema, the cast of the film included several prominent stage actors such as Rudraprasad Sengupta, who was with the theatre group Nandikar and would later become its leader, and Asim Chakraborty, who had set up Chaturmukh theatre group.

=== Shooting ===
Purnendu Patri not only wrote the screenplay for the film, but also handled the art direction. The film was shot on location in Dhurjati Dham, an iconic old building in North Calcutta (now declared a heritage building), which had earlier been used by Satyajit Ray for Jalsaghar.

=== Music ===
The choice of Ramkumar Chattopadhyay as Music Director was an unusual but appropriate one. Chatterjee had not composed music for films prior to Strir Patra, but was well known as a classical singer with a unique repertoire of puratani (old Bengali) songs.

== Awards ==
- Twentieth National Film Awards: National Film Award for Best Feature Film in Bengali
- Tashkent Film Festival: Award for Best Direction
- International Film Festival of India, 2011: Selected for screening in the section "Classics from Tagore"
- BFJA Awards 1974
  - Best Indian films
  - Best black-and-white cinematography - Shakti Banerjee
  - Most outstanding work of the year - Ayan Bandyopadhyay
