= Sukhen Das =

Indian actor (1938–2004)

- Born: Sukhendranath Das; 28 July 1938; Kolkata, Bengal Presidency, British India (present-day West Bengal, India)
- Died: 4 April 2004 (aged 65); Kolkata, India
- Occupations: Actor director Screenplay/story writer
- Known for: Pratisodh (1981); Daan Pratidaan (1992); Amar Kantak (1987)
- Relatives: Piya Sengupta (Daughter); Anup Sengupta (Son-in-law); Bonny Sengupta (Grandson)

Sukhen Das (28 July 1938 – 4 April 2004) was an Indian actor, director, screenwriter and story writer of Bengali cinema.

== Early life and education ==
Das was born as Sukhendranath Das in Kolkata. He spent parts of his childhood in an orphanage i.e. The Ramkrishna Society-Anath Bhandar. He did not finish his education because of financial problems. Later he fled the orphanage and took shelter in a doctor's chamber. During this time he roamed near film studios, and he was spotted by director Debnarayan Gupta who gave him a role as a child actor (Master Sukhen) in the movie Dasiputra (1949).

== Career ==
Das acted in many commercially successful movies including Pratishodh (1981) and Maa Ek Mandir (1988). His roles in the movies Lalu Bhulu (1959), Dhonyi Meye (1971), Rajnandini (1980) and Dadamoni (1984) earned him critical acclaim. He also directed a large number of movies, including Milan Tithi, Sayani, Maan Abhiman (1978) and Singhaduar (1978), and wrote scripts for a number of others. His play 15th July was translated into Hindi. He acted in a large number of jatras as well.

Das was typecast in tragic roles, although he sometimes played comic roles as well, as exemplified by his role in Dhonyi Meye. A typical role for him would be a man who became handicapped in an accident while trying to rescue younger brother or friend, and who was being ill-treated by others. His role in Pratisodh, where he played the role of an action hero, was unusual.

== Personal life ==
He died on 4 April 2004 in a nursing home in Kolkata due to cardiac arrest.

== Filmography ==
=== Actor ===
- Arjun Aamar Naam (2003)
- Biswasghatak (2003)
- Phul Aar Pathar (2002)
- Shesh Bichar (2001)
- Bastir Meye Radha (2000)
- Maan Apaman (1997)
- Daan Pratidan (1993)
- Tapasya (1993)
- Monikanchan (1992)
- Katha Dilam (1991)
- Maan Maryada (1991)
- Nyaydanda (1990)
- Mahapith Tarapith (1989)
- Aghat (1988)
- Boba Sanai (1988)
- Dena Paona (1988)
- Maa Ek Mandir (1988)
- Paap Punya (1987)
- Pratikar (1987)
- Abhiman (1986)
- Amar Bandhan (1986)
- Amarkantak (1986)
- Daktar Bou (1986)
- Milantithi (1985)
- Dadamoni (1984)
- Jiban Maran (1983)
- Mamata (1982)
- Sankalpa (1982)
- Pratisodh (1981)
- Nyay Anyay (1981)
- Satmaa (1981)
- Raja Saheb (1980)
- Rajnandini (1980)
- Sunayani (1979)
- Nishkriti (1978)
- Singhaduar (1978)
- Ajasra Dhanyabad (1977)
- Baba Taraknath (1977)
- Babumasai (1977)
- Behula Lakhindar (1977)
- Nayan (1977)
- Ramer Sumati (1977)
- Sanai (1977)
- Swikarakti (1976)
- Achena Atithi (1973)
- Archana (1972)
- Janatar Adalat (1972)
- Naya Michhil (1972)
- Dhanyee Meye (1971)
- Sona Boudi (1971)
- Duti Mon (1970)
- Agnijuger Kahini (1969)
- Panna Heere Chuni (1969)
- Pratidan (1969)
- Chowrangee (1968)
- Baghini (1968)
- Boudi (1968)
- Kedar Raja (1967)
- Mahasweta (1967)
- Ashru Diye Lekha (1966)
- Griha Sandhane (1966)
- Mayabini Lane (1966)
- Mahalagna (1965)
- Swargo Hote Biday (1964)
- Saat Bhai (1963)
- Hansuli Banker Upakatha (1962)
- Bishakanya (1961)
- Kathin Maya (1961)
- Gariber Meye (1960)
- Jal-Jangal (1959)
- Lalu Bhula (1959)
- Sashibabur Sansar (1959)
- Daily Passenger (1958)
- Maa Shitala (1958)
- Rastar Chhele (1957)
- Chor (1956)
- Bhalobasa (1955)
- Joy Maa Kali Boarding (1955)
- Kalo Bou (1955)
- Rickshaw-Wala (1955)
- Srikrishna Sudama (1955)
- Mantrashakti (1954)
- Banglar Nari (1954)
- Moni Aar Manik (1954)
- Moyla Kagaj (1954)
- Roshenara (1953)
- Bindur Chhele (1952 film) (1952)
- Swapno O Samadhi (1952)
- Pratyabartan (1951)
- Indrajaal (1950)
- Indranath (1950)
- Sahodar (1950)
- Dasiputra (1949)

=== Director ===
- Biswasghatak (2003)
- Shesh Bichar (2001)
- Maan Apaman (1997)
- Daan Pratidan (1993)
- Maan Maryada (1991)
- Nyaydanda (1990)
- Dena Paona (1988)
- Maa Ek Mandir (1988)
- Amar Kantak (1986)
- Milantithi (1985)
- Jiban Maran (1983)
- Swarna Mahal (1982)
- Pratisodh (1981)
- Nyay Anyay (1981)
- Rajnandini (1980)
- Sunayani (1979)
- Maan Abhiman (1978)
- Singhaduar (1978)
- Nayan (1977)
- Achena Atithi (1973)

=== Screenplay/Story ===
- Pratisodh (1981)
- Rajnandini (1980)
- Sunayani (1979)
