= Ajoy Das (music director) =

Indian composer (1941–2013)

- Born: 22 January 1941; Calcutta, Bengal Presidency, British India
- Died: 14 April 2013 (aged 72); Calcutta, West Bengal, India
- Education: City College
- Occupations: Music director and composer

Ajay Das was an Indian music director and composer, and a highly popular figure in the Bengali film industry. He made his debut as a music director in Bengali cinema during the 1970s with the film Sadhu-Yudhisthirer Karcha. The songs and films featuring his compositions enjoyed immense popularity throughout the 1970s, 1980s, and 1990s.

== Early life and career ==
Ajay Das was the son of Phanindranath Das and Amiya Das. The couple had three sons—Malay Das, Ajay Das, and Sukhen Das—and two daughters. Phanindranath Das had inherited several businesses, including a cinema hall in Nabadwip. Being an extremely simple and trusting man, he was defrauded and eventually driven to bankruptcy.

Ajay Das, the second son of the family, was born on January 22, 1941. Ajay and Sukhen began living at the Ramakrishna Society Anath Bhandar on Creek Row. He completed his schooling at the Metropolitan School in Bowbazar and subsequently earned a bachelor's degree in Humanities from City College, Kolkata. Ajay Das was the elder brother of the highly successful producer, director, and actor Sukhen Das. He began composing music at the age of just fourteen, having received his initial musical training from Chinmoy Lahiri and Nirmal Sarkar.

== Musical career ==
In 1969, he composed his first music for a stage play. Later, he directed and composed music for many popular Bengali films. The duo of Sukhena Das and Ajay Das, were very successful and popular in the history of Bengali cinema. The songs composed by Ajay Das in Sukhena Das' family films left a deep impression on the audience. Some of the notable films for which he directed music are Archana (1971), Charumurti (1978), Swarna Mahal (1978), Pratishodh (1981), Mamata (1982), Milan Tithi (1985), Pap Punya (1987), Shrimati Hansraj (1989), Joar Bhata (1990), Sukher Swarg (1993), Abirbhab (1995), Pratidhvani (1995) and Aparajit (1998) etc.

He has worked with many eminent personalities like Kishore Kumar, Lata Mangeshkar, Pratima Banerjee, Gauriprasanna Mazumder, Pulak Banerjee and Uttam Kumar. Popular songs sung by Kishore Kumar in his tunes are "Ai Toh Jeevan" (Amar Kantak), "Sukheo Kende Bhude Maan" (Milan Tithi), "Aar To Nai Badi Din" (Milan Tithi), "Ami Je Ke Tomar" (Anurager Chhoa) and others.

== Death ==
He made immense contributions to Bengali music; after suffering from Alzheimer's disease for 13 years during the final phase of his life, he died in Kolkata in 2013.
