= List of Indian Bengali films before 1950 =

List of Indian bengali-language films before 1950

This is a list of films produced by the Bengali language film industry based in Kolkata before 1950. For early silent films, see list of silent Indian Bengali films.

== 1931 ==
Title	Director	Cast	Genre	Notes/music
Dena Paona	Premankur Atarthi	Durgadas Bandyopadhyay, Amar Mullik, Jahar Gangopadhyay, Bhanu Bandyopadhyay (Sr.), Bhumen Ray, Kusumkumari, Nibhanani Debi, Umasashi, Sishubala, Anupama Debi, Abhabati	Family film	It is credited as the first Bengali talkie. It was released in the same year as Alam Ara, the first Indian talkie. It was released on 24 December 1931 at Chitra (now Mitra) Cinema Hall in Calcutta.
Jamai Shashthi (short)	Amar Chowdhury	Amar Chowdhury, Jatin Singha, Kshirodgopal Mukhopadhyay, Ms. Golela, Ranisundari, Bimal Gupta, Kartik Ray, Bholanath	Drama	It is credited as the first Bengali talkie (short). It was released in the same year as Alam Ara, the first Indian talkie. It was released on 11 April 1931 at Crown Cinema Hall in Calcutta.
Jor Barat (short)	Jyotish Bandyopadhyay	Joynarayan Mukhopadhyay, Kartik Dey, Kanan Debi, Kartik Ray, Prakashmoni, Kunjalal Chakraborty, Renubala, Nagendrabala, Satyendranath Dey, Bhupendranath Bandyopadhyay	Romance	
Prahlad	Priyanath Gangopadhyay	Ahindra Chowdhury, Joynarayan Mukhopadhyay, Mrinalkanti Ghosh, Shanti Gupta, Niharbala, Kunjalal Chakraborty, Debabala, Binapani Debi, Kanan Debi, Dhiren Das	Epic film	
Rishir Prem	Jyotish Bandyopadhyay	Kanan Debi, Ahindra Chowdhury, Hiren Bose, Sarajubala, Joynarayan Mukhopadhyay, Ganesh Goswami, Dhiren Das, Surabala, Nirupama Debi, Charubala, Gita Debi	Romance	
Tritiya Paksha (short)	Amar Chowdhury	Amar Chowdhury, Jatin Singha, Kshirodgopal Mukhopadhyay, Ms. Golela, Ms. Golap	Drama	

== 1932 ==
Title	Director	Cast	Genre	Notes/music
Bangal 1983	Pramathesh Barua	Pramathesh Barua, Sushil Majumdar	Family film	
Bishnumaya (Kangsabadh)	Jyotish Bandyopadhyay	Ahindra Choudhury, Joynarayan Mukhopadhyay	Family film	
Chandidas	Debaki Kumar Bose	Durgadas Bannerjee, Manoranjan Bhattacharya, Amar Mullick, Umashashi	Family film	
Chirakumar Sabha	Premankur Atarthi	Manoranjan Bhattacharya, Tinkari Chakraborty	Family film	
Chirakumari		Amar Chowdhury, Radharani	Family film	
Krishnakanter Will	Jyotish Bandyopadhyay	Ahindra Choudhury, Dhiraj Bhattacharya	Family film	
Natir Puja	Rabindranath Tagore	The Students Of Shantiniketan	Family film	
Pallisamaj	Sisir Kumar Bhaduri	Prabha Debi, Biswanath Bhadhuri	Family film	
Punarjanma	Premankur Atarthi	Amar Mullick, Debabala	Family film	

== 1933 ==
Title	Director	Cast	Genre	Notes/Music
Bilwamangal	Tinkari Chakraborty	Ranibala, Ratin Bandyopadhyay	Family film	
Jamuna Puline		Dhiraj Bhattacharya	Family film	
Joydeb			Family film	
Kapalkundala	Premankur Atorthy	Uma Sashi, Durgadas Bannerjee, Manoranjan Bhattacharya, Molina Devi, Nibhanini Devi, Amar Mullick, Amulya Mitra	Family film	Music: R. C. Boral
Mastuto Bhai (Short)	Dhirendranath Ganguly	Nirmal Bannerjee, Boken Chatterjee, Molina Devi, Dhirendranath Ganguly, Kamala Jharia, Nagendrabala	Family film	
Mirabai			Family film	
Radhakrishna (Kalanka Bhanjan)	Amar Chowdhury	Lakshmi, Duniyabala, Niradasundari, Amar Chowdhury, Khirodegopal Mukherjee	Family film	
Sabitri	Jyotish Mukherjee		Family film	
Sabitri	Naresh Mitra		Family film	
Sita			Family film	
Sree Gouranga			Family film	

== 1934 ==
Title	Director	Cast	Genre	Notes/music
Chand Saudagar	Prafulla Roy	Dhiraj Bhattacharya, Suhasini Debi	Family film	
Dakshayagna	Jyotish Bandyopadhyay	Ahindra Choudhury, Tulsi Chakraborty	Family film	
Dhruba	Kaji Nazrul Islam	Joynarayan Mukhopadhyay, Kazi Nazrul Islam	Family film	
Excuse Me Sir (short)	Dhirendranath Gangopadhyay	Dhirendranath Gangopadhyay, Molina Debi	Family film	
Keranir Jiban (short)	Tulsi Lahiri	Debabala, Tulsi Lahiri	Family film	
Maa	Prafulla Ghosh	Kanan Devi, Binoy Goswami	Family film	
Mahua	Hiren Bose	Ahindra Choudhury, Ahi Sanyal	Family film	
Mohabbat Ki Kasauti	P. C. Barua	K. L. Saigal, Rattan Bai, Pahari Sanyal, Noor Mohammed Charlie	Historical Drama	
Monikanchan Part-I (short)	Tulsi Lahiri	Joynarayan Mukhopadhyay, Tulsi Lahiri	Family film	
Pear Brothers (cartoon)	Rai Chand Boral	Shyam Laha, Amar Mullick	Family film	First Bengali cartoon film
Rajnati Basantasena	Charu Roy	Dhiraj Bhattacharya, Rabi Ray	Family film	
Reenmukti (Naramedh Yagna)	Tinkari Chakraborty	Radha Rani, Sailen Chattopadhyay	Family film	
Ruplekha	Pramathesh Barua	Ahindra Choudhury, Pramathesh Barua	Family film	
Sachidulal	Prafulla Roy	Tulsi Chakraborty, Ranibala	Family film	
Seeta	Debaki Bose	Gul Hamid, Prithviraj Kapoor, Durga Khote		
Shubho Tryahasparsha	Manmatha Ray	Jahar Gangopadhyay, Asha Bose	Family film	
Taruni	Priyanath Gangopadhyay	Jiban Gangopadhyay, Joynarayan Mukhopadhyay	Family film	
Tulsidas	Jyotish Gangopadhyay	Jahar Gangopadhyay, Joynarayan Mukhopadhyay	Family film	

== 1935 ==
Title	Director	Cast	Genre	Notes/music
Abasheshe (Short)	Dineshranjan Das	Pramathesh Barua, Molina Devi	Family film	
Basabdatta	Satish Dasgupta	Dhiraj Bhattacharya, Kanan Devi	Family film	
Bhagya Chakra	Nitin Bose	Pahari Sanyal, Indu Mukhopadhyay	Family film	
Bidrohi	Dhirendranath Gangopadhyay	Ahindra Choudhury, Anupam Ghatak	Family film	
Bidyasundar	Priyanath Gangopadhyay	Ranibala, Lalit Mitra	Family film	
Biraha	Tinkari Chakraborty	Tinkari Chakraborty, Ranibala	Family film	
Devdas	Pramathesh Barua	K. L. Saigal, Pramathesh Barua	Family film	
Debdasi	Prafulla Ghosh	Ahindra Choudhury, Indu Mukhopadhyay	Family film	
Dikdari (Short)	Jyotish Mukhopadhyay	Ranjit Roy, Tulsi Lahiri	Family film	
Harishchandra	Prafulla Ghosh	Bhanu Ray, Bhaskar Deb	Family film	
Kanthahar	Jyotish Bandyopadhyay	Ahindra Choudhury, Jahar Gangopadhyay	Family film	
Khasdakhal	Rameshchandra Dutta	Indu Mukhopadhyay, Renuka Ray	Family film	
Manmoyee Girls' School	Jyotish Bandyopadhyay	Jahar Gangopadhyay, Tulsi Chakraborty	Family film	
Mantrashakti	Satu Sen	Jahar Gangopadhyay, Manoranjan Bhattacharya	Family film	
Monikanchan Part-II (Short)	Tulsi Lahiri	Ranibala, Sishubala	Family film	
Nari Pragati (Short)	Tulsi Lahiri		Family film	
Patalpuri	Priyanath Gangopadhyay	Jiban Gangopadhyay, Tinkari Chakraborty	Family film	
Payer Dhulo	Jyotish Mukhopadhyay	Jahar Gangopadhyay, Joynarayan Mukhopadhyay	Family film	
Phantom Of Calcutta	Anandamohan Ray	Santosh Sinha, Anandamohan Ray	Family film	
Prafulla	Tinkari Chakraborty	Ahindra Choudhury, Jahar Gangopadhyay	Family film	
Ratkana (Short)	Jatin Das	Krishnadhan Mukhopadhyay, Ranjit Roy	Family film	
Sanjher Pidim (Short)			Family film	
Satya Pathe	Amar Chowdhury	Jahar Gangopadhyay, Amar Chowdhury	Family film	
Shesh Patra (Short)	Kalipada Das	Lalit Mitra, Bhola Mitra	Family film	
Sudurer Priya (Short)			Family film	
Swayambara	K. Bhushan	Lalit Mitra, Bhumen Roy	Family film	

== Gallery ==
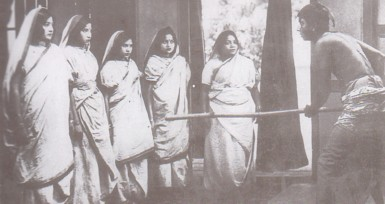
A scene from Dena Paona, 1931, the first Bengali talkie

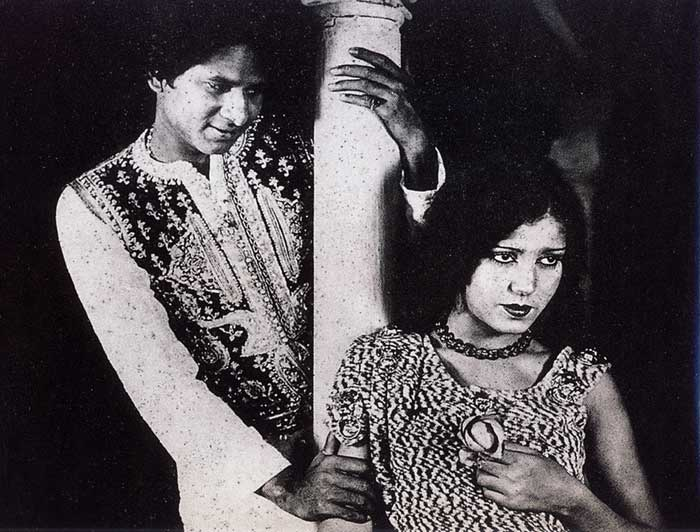
Alam Arya
