= Kapalkundala =

1866 novel by Bankim Chandra Chattopadhyay

- Author: Bankim Chandra Chattopadhyay
- Original title: কপালকুণ্ডলা
- Language: Bengali
- Genre: Novel
- Publication date: 1866
- Publication place: India
- Media type: Print
- OCLC: 671908675

Kapalkundala (Bengali: কপালকুণ্ডলা) is a Bengali romance novel by Indian writer Bankim Chandra Chattopadhyay. Published in 1866, it is a story of a forest-dwelling girl named Kapalkundala, who fell in love with and married Nabakumar, a young gentleman from Saptagram, but eventually found that she is unable to adjust herself to city life. Following the success of Chattopadhyay's first novel Durgeshnandini, he decided to write about a girl who is brought up in a remote forest by a Kapalika (Tantrik sage) and never saw anyone but her foster-father. The story is set around the Kapalkundala Temple at Dariapur, Contai in modern-day Purba Medinipur district, West Bengal where Chattopadhyay served as a Deputy Magistrate and Deputy Collector.

Kapalkundala is considered one of the finest and the most popular of Chattopadhyay's novels. It has been translated into English, German, Hindi, Gujarati, Tamil, Telugu and Sanskrit. Girish Chandra Ghosh, one of the pioneers of Bengali drama, and Atul Krishna Mitra dramatized the novel separately.

== Synopsis ==
Nabakumar Sharma of Saptagram, while returning from a pilgrimage to Gangasagar, is caught in a storm and left stranded on an island, near a forest. Believed dead by his fellow pilgrims, he is abandoned.

In the forest, he is captured by a Kapalik, a Tantric sage who plans to sacrifice him to the goddess Bhairavi. The Kapalik’s foster-daughter, Kapalkundala, rescues Nabakumar and later agrees to marry him. The couple returns to Saptagram, where she adopts the name Mrinmoyee.

On the way home, they encounter a Muslim woman named Motibibi, who is revealed to be Padmabati, Nabakumar’s first wife. Years earlier, she had been forcibly converted to Islam, leading Nabakumar to leave her, according to the prevailing societal norms.

Motibibi, longing to reclaim her husband’s love, later visits Saptagram in disguise of a man, and requests Kapalkundala to leave him, to which the naive Kapalkundala readily agrees.

Nabakumar, unaware of the deception, suspects Kapalkundala of infidelity. Misled by the Kapalik, who has also come to Saptagram seeking revenge, Nabakumar agrees to a second sacrifice — this time of his wife.

At the cremation ground, the misunderstanding is revealed. Nabakumar begs her to return, but Kapalkundala, disillusioned and unwilling to continue living, refuses. As the Ganga crashes into the ghat and breaks the steps beneath her, she falls into the river. Nabakumar jumps in after her and also drowns.

== Sequel ==
In 1874, Damodar Mukhopadhyay, a relative of Chattopadhyay, wrote Mrinmayee, a sequel to Kapalkundala. Mukhopadhyay also wrote Nabab-Nandini, a sequel to Chattopadhyay's first work Durgeshnandini, in 1901.

== In adaptation ==
=== Films ===
Bengali

- 1929: Kapalkundala, starring Durgadas Bannerjee, Indira Devi, Sita Devi, directed by Priyanath N. Ganguly.
- 1933: Kapalkundala, starring Durgadas Bannerjee, Manoranjan Bhattacharya and Molina Devi, directed by Premankur Atorthy.
- 1952: Kapalkundala, directed by Ardhendu Mukherjee.
- 1981: Kapalkundala, directed by Pinaki Bhushan Mukherji starring Bhanu Banerjee, Ranjit Mallick, Mahua Roy Chowdhury.

Hindi

- 1939: Kapal Kundala, starring Sailen Choudhury, Leela Desai and Najmul Hussain, directed by Nitin Bose, Phani Majumdar.

=== Television ===
- Kapal Kundala, a television series based on the aired on DD National.
- 2019-20: Kapalkundala, an Indian Bengali television soap opera that aired on Star Jalsha.

=== Others ===
- It was adapted as a comic by Debrani Mitra in the 720th issue of the Indian comic book series, Amar Chitra Katha.
