= Kapalkundala (1929 film) =

- Directed by: Priyanath N. Ganguly
- Written by: Based on the novel Kapalkundala by Bankim Chandra Chattopadhyay
- Story by: Bankim Chandra Chattopadhyay
- Produced by: Madan Theatres
- Starring: Durgadas Bannerjee; Indira Devi; Sita Devi
- Cinematography: Signor Marconi
- Production company: Madan Theatres
- Release date: 1929
- Running time: 13 reels
- Country: India
- Languages: Silent; English intertitles

Kapalkundala is an Indian silent film directed by Priyanath N. Ganguly, based on 1866 Bengali epic novel Kapalkundala by Bankim Chandra Chattopadhyay. This film was released in 1929 under the banner of Madan Theatres. It is one of the most successful Indian silent films and the first screen adaptations of the novel. The film was the first silver jubilee hit with a straight run of 29 weeks at Crown Cinema in Kolkata.

== Plot ==
The plot revolves with the life of Nabakumar, a young man who becomes stranded in a forest while returning from a pilgrimage. He is rescued by Kapalkundala, the foster daughter of a Tantric and his life takes a dangerous turn.

== Cast ==
- Durgadas Bannerjee as Nabakumar
- Indira Devi as Kapalkundala
- Patience Cooper as Motibibi
- Prabodh Chandra Bose as Kapalik
- Santi Gupta as Goddess Kali
- Sita Devi
- Naresh Mitter
- Dani Babu
- Tulsi Banerji
- Surendra Nath Ghosh

== See also ==
- Kapalkundala (1933 film)
- Kapalkundala (1952 film)
- Kapalkundala (1981 film)
- Kapalkundala (TV series)
