= Matri Sneha =

1923 film

- Directed by: Jyotish Bannerjee
- Starring: Akshay Babu; Amar Choudhury; Patience Cooper
- Production company: Madan Theatres Pvt. Ltd
- Release date: 17 March 1923 (Calcutta)
- Country: India
- Language: Bengali

Matri Sneha (transl. A Mother's Devotion) is a 1923 Bengali film directed by Jyotish Bannerjee. The film was made under the banner of Madan Theatres Pvt. Ltd.

== Cast ==
- Akshay Babu as Ganesh
- Amar Choudhury as Pagal
- Patience Cooper as Leela
- Tulsi Lahiri as Nirmal
- Edwin Mayer as Dulal
- Miss Kumud
- Niradasundari
- Prabha Devi
- Sushila Sundari
- Ashalata Wabgaonkar

== See also ==
- Tritiya Paksha
