= Punarjanma =

Punarjanma (lit. 'Punarjanman', reincarnation or rebirth in Indian religions) may refer to these Indian films:

- Punarjanma (1932 film), a Bengali-language film directed by Premankur Atorthy
- Punarjanma (1938 film), a Hindi-language film directed by Ramnik Desai
- Punarjanma (1963 film), a Telugu-language film directed by Kotayya Pratyagatma
- Punarjanma (1969 film), a Kannada-language film directed by Peketi Shivaram

== See also ==
- Punar Janmam, a 1961 Tamil-language film directed by R. S. Mani
- Punarjanmam, a 1972 Malayalam-language film directed by K. S. Sethumadhavan
