= Parabhritika =

- Directed by: Bidhayak Bhattacharya
- Starring: See below
- Music by: Bimal Chattopadhyay
- Production company: P. N. Gangopadhyay Production
- Release date: 1947
- Country: India
- Language: Bengali

Parabhritika is a 1947 Bengali film. The film was directed by Bidhayak Bhattacharya and it was made under P. N. Gangopadhyay Production banner. Bimal Chattopadhyay composed the music of this film.

== Cast ==
- Amar Choudhury
- Jiban Gangopadhyay
- Tulsi Lahiri
- Nilima Das
- Sarajubala
- Amita Bose
- Chitra Debi
- Kamala Adhikari
- Tara Bhaduri
- Aranya Ray
- Dhiresh Majumdar
- Jiban Mukhopadhyay
- Maya Singha
- Nakul Dutta
- Shibshankar Sen
- Siddheswar Bhattacharya

== See also ==
- Kuhelika
