= Rattan Bai =

Indian actress

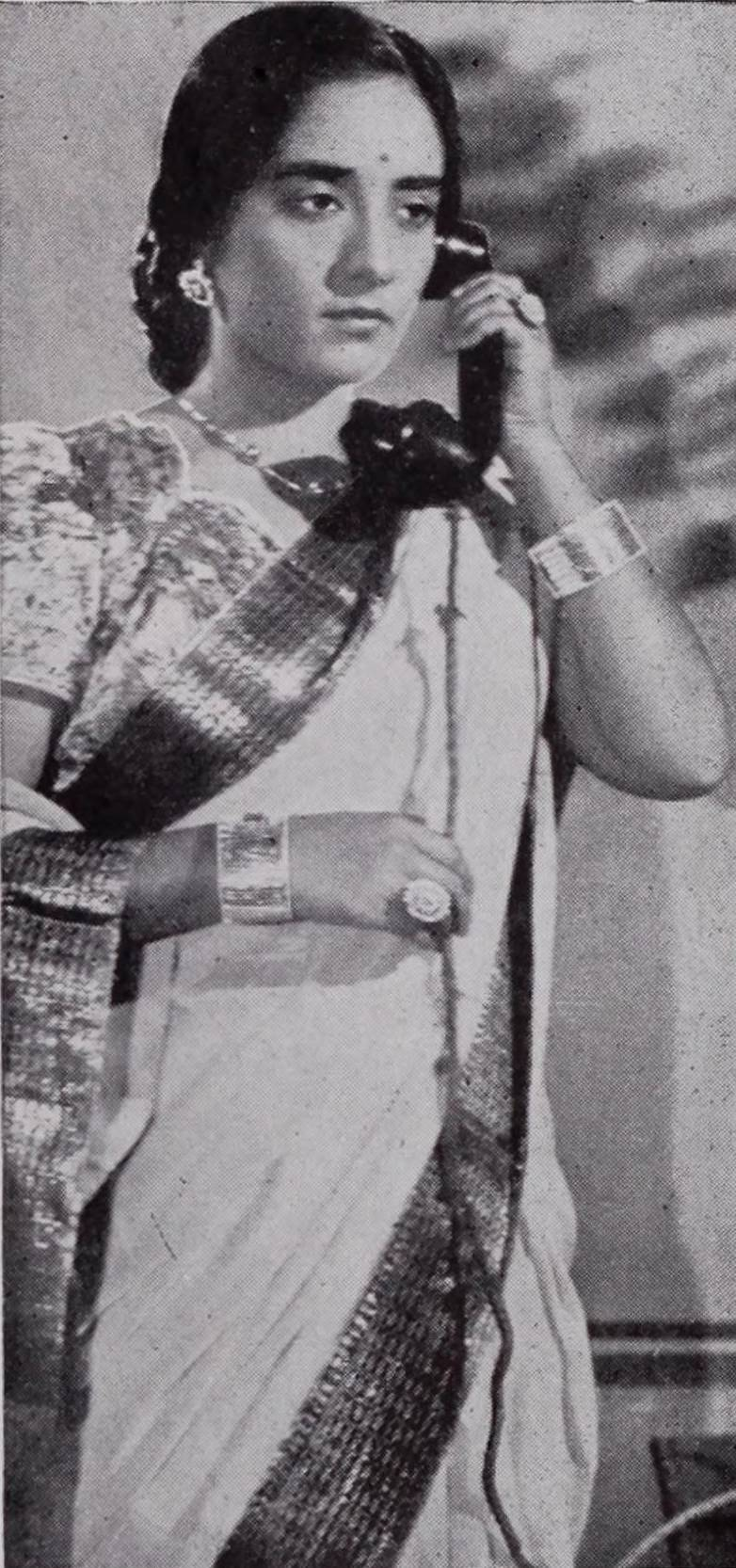
Rattan Bai in 1942

Rattan Bai (15 July 1890 – 1 January 1986) was an Indian actress and singer. She was the mother of actress Shobhna Samarth, grandmother of actresses Nutan and Tanuja and the great-grandmother of actors Kajol, Tanishaa Mukerji and Mohnish Bahl.

== Biography ==
Rattan Bai's mother was Neera Bai who was a temple singer from Sindhudurg belonging to the Gomantak Maratha Samaj community. Her father belonged to the Chandraseniya Kayastha Prabhu caste and was a local government official from Thane. Rattan Bai lived with Prabhakar Shilotri, proprietor of Shilotri Bank of Bombay.

Rattan Bai composed bhajans and sang them as well. She published the lyrics of her bhajans to distribute among friends who would sing with her during Maha Shivaratri celebrations at her home in Chembur. Rattanbai acted in only one Marathi film called Swarajyachya Seemewar, as Chatrapati Shivaji Maharaj's mother.

== Filmography ==
Year	Title	Role
1933	Yahudi Ki Ladki	Hannah, Daccia
1933	Rajrani Meera	Lal Bai
1934	Roop Lekha	Rupkumari
1935	Yasmin	Yasmin
1935	Karwane Hayat	Zarina
1935	Bhikharan	Madhavi
1935	Bharat Ki Beti	
1936	Sarala	Sarala
1936	Hind Mahila	
1938	Sitara	Azurie
1940	Kalyani	
1942	Ujala	
1942	Lajwanti	
1942	Haso Haso Ai Duniyawallaon	
1942	Malan	
1945	Dharm	
1945	Shri Krishn Arjun Yuddha	
