= Haar Jeet =

Haar Jeet may refer to:

- Haar Jeet (1940 film), an Indian Hindi-language film directed by Amar Mullick
- Haar Jeet (1954 film), an Indian Hindi-language film of 1954
- Haar Jeet (1972 film), an Indian Hindi-language film directed by C.P. Dixit
- Haar Jeet (1990 film), an Indian Hindi-language film of 1990
