= Sarala (film) =

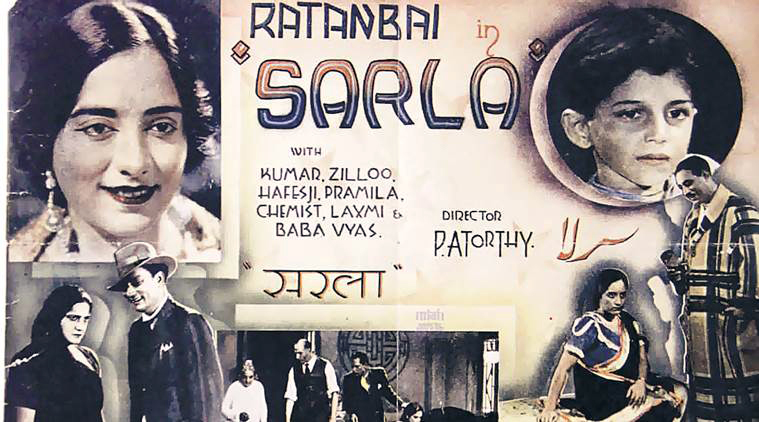
- Poster
- Directed by: Premankur Atorthy
- Written by: Premankur Atorthy
- Produced by: Imperial Film Company
- Starring: Rattan Bai; Kumar; Ahindra Choudhury; Pramila
- Cinematography: Rustam Irani
- Music by: H. C. Bali
- Production company: Imperial Film Company
- Release date: 1936
- Running time: 157 min
- Country: India
- Language: Hindi

Sarla is a 1936 Indian Hindi-language drama film directed by Premankur Atorthy. The film was produced by Imperial Film Company. The director of photography was Rustam Irani with music by H. C. Bali. It starred Rattan Bai, Kumar, Hafisji, Pramila, Anant Marathe and Ahindra Choudhury.

== Cast ==
- Rattan Bai
- Kumar
- Hafisji
- Pramila
- Ahindra Choudhury
- Anant Marathe
- Baba Vyas
- Asooji
- Chemist
- Jilloobai

== Songs ==
- "Apna Hi Tujhko Vichar"
- "Man Mein Udne Ko Kyun Soche"
- "Hato Jao Hame Na Satao"
- "Prabhu Tum Aao Daras Dikhao"
- "Piya Ke Milne Ki Aas"
- "Prabhu Mori Naiya Padi Majhdhar"
- "Na Kisiki Ankh Ka Nur Hoon"
- "Neha Barse Rhumjhum Rhumjhum"
- "Gham-E-Dil Kis Se Kahoon"
