= Dulhan =

Dulhan may refer to:

- Dulhan (1938 film), an Indian social film by Premankur Atorthy
- Dulhan (1958 film), an Indian drama film by V.M. Vyas, starring Raaj Kumar, Nirupa Roy and Nanda
- Dulhan (1963 film), a Pakistani film
- Dulhan (1975 film), an Indian drama film by C.V. Rajendran, starring Hema Malini
- Dulhan (TV series), a 2020 Pakistani serial by Momina Duraid

== See also ==
- Dulhania, an Indian film series, including
  - Humpty Sharma Ki Dulhania (2014)
  - Badrinath Ki Dulhania (2017)
