= Kapalkundala (1952 film) =

- Directed by: Ardhendu Mukherjee
- Written by: Narayan Gangopadhyay (screenplay)
- Based on: Kapalkundala by Bankim Chandra Chattopadhyay
- Produced by: Aaj Productions
- Starring: Sandhyarani; Bhanu Bandopadhyay; Nitish Mukhopadhyay; Tulsi Chakraborty
- Cinematography: Prabodh Das
- Edited by: Kali Raha
- Music by: Anupam Ghatak
- Production company: Aaj Productions
- Release date: 24 October 1952
- Country: India
- Language: Bengali

Kapalkundala is a Bengali drama film directed by Ardhendu Mukherjee based on the 1866 classic novel Kapalkundala by Bankim Chandra Chattopadhyay. The film was released on 24 October 1952 under the banner of Aaj Productions.

== Plot ==
Nabakumar, a young man abandoned in a forest while returning from Gangasagar and captured by a Kapalik. Kapalkundala, Kapalik's foster daughter, helps him to escape and marries him. But the relationship leads to a tragic end.

== Cast ==
- Pranati Ghosh as Kapalkundala
- Samir Kumar as Nabakumar
- Sandhyarani as Padmavati
- Nitish Mukhopadhyay as the skull-bearer ascetic
- Bhanu Bandopadhyay
- Tulsi Chakraborty
- Nripati Chattopadhyay
- Shobha Sen
- Nibhanani Devi
- Kanu Bandopadhyay
- Nabadwip Haldar
- Jiben Bose
- Pranati Ghosh
- Prabha Devi
- Swagata Chakraborty

== See also ==
- Kapalkundala (1929 film)
- Kapalkundala (1933 film)
- Kapal Kundala (1939 film)
