= Prahlada (disambiguation) =

Prahlada is a figure in Hindu mythology.

Prahlad, Prahalada, or Prahlada may also refer to:

- Prahlada (film), a 1941 Indian film
- Prahalada (film), a 1939 Indian film
- Prahlad (film), a 1931 Indian film
- Prahlada (scientist), an Indian missile scientist

== See also ==
- Bhakta Prahlada (disambiguation)
