= Abatar (film) =

- Directed by: Premankur Atorthy
- Produced by: Sree Bharat Lakshmi Pictures
- Starring: Durgadas Bannerjee; Tulsi Chakraborty; Ahindra Choudhury; Devbala
- Cinematography: Nitin Bose
- Music by: Himangshu Dutta
- Production company: Sree Bharat Laxmi Pictures
- Release date: 1941
- Country: India
- Language: Bengali

Abatar ("The Incarnation") also known as Avatar is a 1941 Indian Bengali mythological social drama film directed by Premankur Atorthy. The film was produced by Sree Bharat Lakshmi Pictures. The music of the film was composed by Himangshu Dutta, who is referred to as Surasagar Himangshu Dutta. He made use of Rabindra Sangeet in his compositions and helped familiarize S. D. Burman with its use in composing semi-classical songs. The cast included Durgadas Bannerjee, Ahindra Choudhury, Jyotsna Gupta, Tulsi Lahiri, Utpal Sen and Panna Devi. The film is a mythological rendering along with satire of modern society and rapid extension of generation through industrialization, economy and modern politics during second world war. The story of the film is about King Indranath's misfortunes and the descent to earth of gods incarnated as humans.

== Plot ==
Indranath's son is ill, Guru Omkarananda suggests he prays to the goddess Kamala. His son improves but bad luck follows Indranath; his son and daughter die. Unable to stand the grief the Queen/Kalyani loses her mental equilibrium. Goddess Kamala manifests as Rupasi, the daughter of Omkarananda. Virodhananda and his son Tribhanga are the incarnation of Narad and Narayan on earth. The kingdom goes through difficult times. Omkarananda is arrested and Rupasi goes to meet Bastabesh/Indranath who is attracted to her. Rupasi takes refuge in Birodhananda's house to avoid Bastabesh's advances. Birodhananda is interested in getting his son Tribhanga married to Rupasi. Bastabesh goes after Rupasi/Kamala who blinds him. Finally the gods perform their miracle and a repentant Bastabesh is restored of his sight and kingdom.

== Cast ==
- Durgadas Bannerjee as Narayan/Tribhanga
- Ahindra Choudhury as Indranath/Bastavesh
- Jyotsna Gupta as Kamala/Rupasi
- Tulsi Lahiri as Narad/Birodhananda
- Bhumen Roy as Bhishwakarma/Jantraraj
- Utpal Sen as Omkarananda
- Renuka Roy as Maya
- Panna Devi as Kalyani/Rani
- Kamla Jharia as singer
- Santosh Singha
- Nitish Mukhopadhyay
- Satya Mukhopadhyay as laatai
- Kartik Roy

== Music ==
The music of 'Abatar' composed by 'Rabindra Sangeet' music director Himangshu Dutta, use 'Rabindra Sangeet' Elements to compose the film songs.
