= Dariapur, Purba Medinipur =

Dariapur
- Village
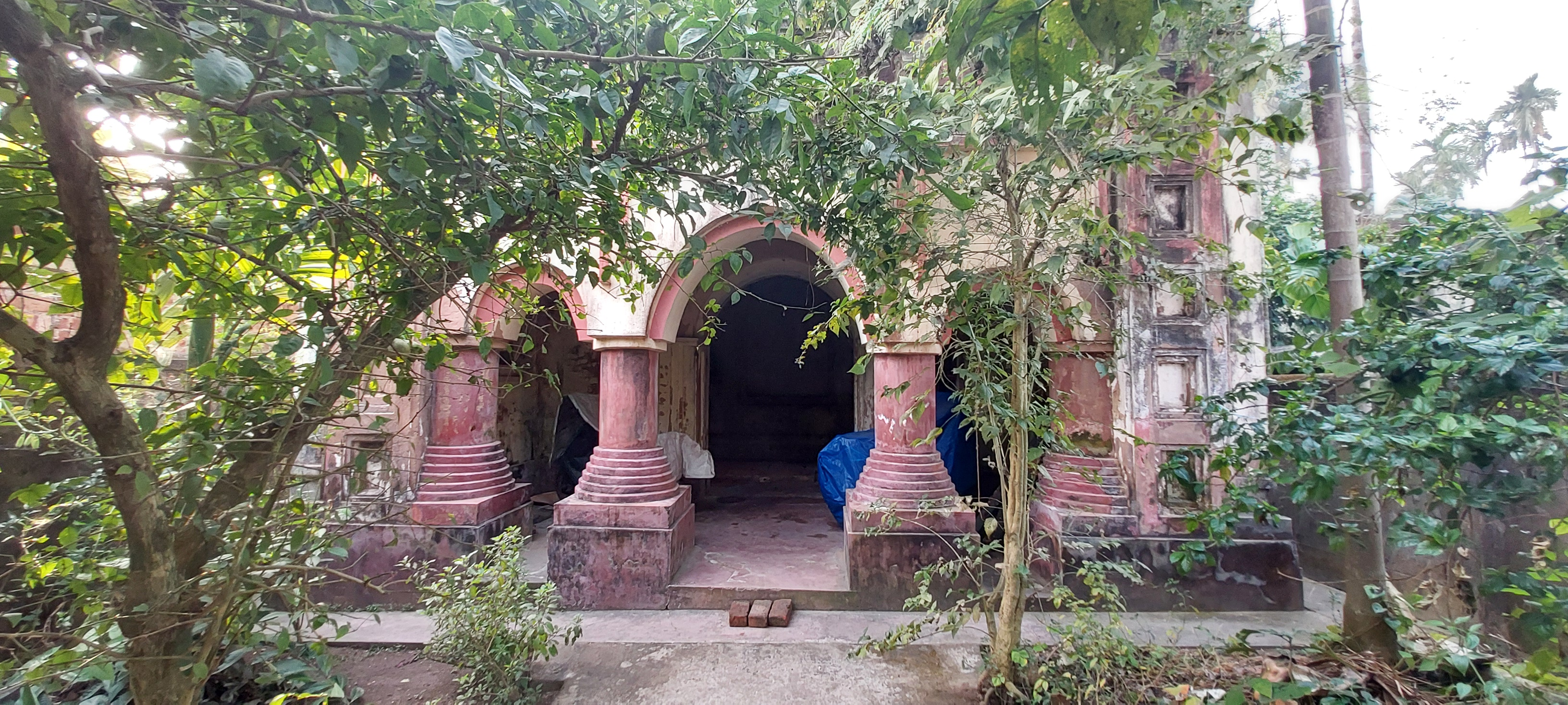
- Kapalkundala temple at Dariapur

- Location in West Bengal, India Dariapur (India)
- Coordinates: 21.798367°N 87.858981°E
- Country: India
- State: West Bengal
- District: Purba Medinipur

Population (2011)
  - Total: 161

Languages
  - Official: Bengali, English
- Time zone: UTC+5:30 (IST)
- Lok Sabha constituency: Contai
- Vidhan Sabha constituency: Contai North
- Website: purbamedinipur.gov.in

Dariapur is a village in the Deshapran CD block in the Contai subdivision of the Purba Medinipur district in the state of West Bengal, India.

== Geography ==
Cities and towns in Contai subdivision of Purba Medinipur district
M: municipal city/ town, CT: census town, R: rural/ urban centre, H: historical/ religious centre, S: port, sea-beach
Owing to space constraints in the small map, the actual locations in a larger map may vary slightly

=== Location ===
Diariapur is located at 21.798367°N 87.858981°E.

=== Urbanisation ===
93.55% of the population of Contai subdivision live in the rural areas. Only 6.45% of the population live in the urban areas and it is considerably behind Haldia subdivision in urbanization, where 20.81% of the population live in urban areas.

Note: The map alongside presents some of the notable locations in the subdivision. All places marked in the map are linked in the larger full screen map.

== Demographics ==
According to the 2011 Census of India, Dariapur had a total population of 1,375, of which 719 (52%) were males and 656 (48%) were females. There were 133 persons in the age range of 0–6 years. The total number of literate persons in Dariapur was 1,134 (91.30% of the population over 6 years).

== Lighthouse ==
There is a 30 metres (98 ft) tall lighthouse at Dariapur. The range of visibility is 19 sea miles. The construction of the present RCC lighthouse tower was completed in 1964 and the PV equipment, consisting of a 230 V 70 W metal halide lamp and low maintenance batteries, was installed in 1999. Earlier there was a 20 metres (66 ft) tall mild steel structure lighthouse tower 1 km east of the present site. It was erected in 1943 and dismantled in 1964. The PV equipment of the old tower was initially placed in the new tower and used till it was replaced by more effective equipment.

== Kapalkundala temple ==
Bankim Chandra Chatterjee wrote his second novel Kapalkundala in 1866. it is a story of a forest-dwelling girl named Kapalkundala, who fell in love with and married a young man from the city, but eventually found that she was unable to adjust herself with city life. Following the success of Chatterjee’s first novel Durgeshnandini, he wrote Kapalkundala. The story is set in Dariapur, where Chatterjee served as a Deputy Magistrate and Deputy Collector.

Kapalkundala Temple has been declared a heritage site by the West Bengal Heritage Commission.

== Dariapur picture gallery ==
Dariapur Lighthouse

Kapalkundala Mandir – this is a renovated version of what locals believe was the temple Bankim Chandra Chaterjee refers to in his novel.

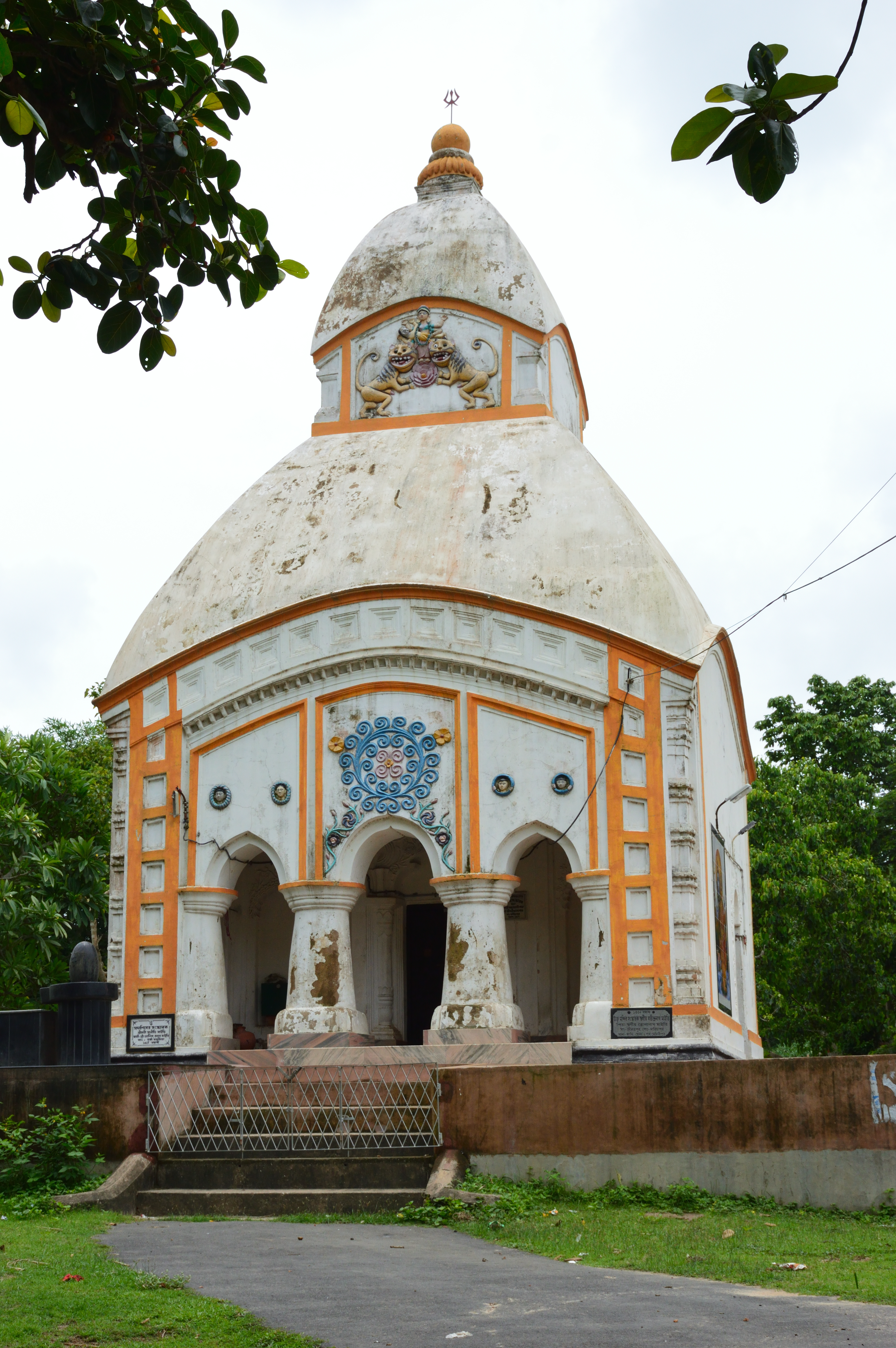
Siddheswara Shiva temple
