= List of Hindi films of 1922 =

A list of films produced by the Bollywood film industry based in Mumbai in 1922:

== 1922 in Indian cinema ==
- The first Levy of Entertainment Tax was introduced in Bengal in 1922, followed by its introduction in Bombay in 1923.
- Fatma Begum, who got her early training acting in plays, started working in films in 1922. Mother to actresses Zubeida, Sultana and Shehzadi, Fatma went on to become the first woman producer and director when she formed her own production company Fatma Films in 1926.
- Dhirendranath Ganguly, who had initially set up Indo-British Film Studio with Nitish Lahiri in 1918, returned to Hyderabad and started the Lotus Film Company there in 1922 up to 1924. He produced six films in 1922, including Bimata (Stepmother), and acted in Sadhu Aur Shaitan.
- Manilal Joshi started his career as a director with his debut film Veer Abhimanyu. The film was produced by Ardeshir Irani and Bhogilal K. M. Dave who had started their banner, Star Film Company Ltd. in 1922.

=== Films ===
- Andhare Alo (The Influence Of Love) a Bengali silent film, was directed by Sisir Bhaduri and Naresh Mitra. It was a debut production from Taj Mahal Films, Calcutta. The story was based on a love triangle written by Saratchandra Chatterjee. Its melodramatic content was appreciated by the critics. The film was claimed to be a "huge hit" at the box-office.
- Lady Teacher was a social comedy directed by Dhirendranath Ganguly, and is cited as one of the successes of 1922.
- Pati Bhakti also called Human Emotions was directed by J. J. Madan for his banner Madan Theatres Ltd. The film was based on a play by Harikrishna Jauhar. The Madras censors "demanded" the removal of an "obscene dance" scene. It made actress Patience Cooper, who starred in the film, "one of the biggest star of that time". The film also featured some of the earliest kissing scenes.
- Sukanya Savitri directed by Kanjibhai Rathod for Kohinoor Film Company, starred Miss Moti, Sakina and Jamna. The story was by Mohanlal Dave. The film remains the only surviving work by Kohinoor and Rathod.
- Veer Abhimanyu by director Manilal Joshi, also called Virat Swaroop, was a "big-budget mythological" and a first for producers Ardeshir Irani and Bhogilal Dave. It was also a debut for actress Sultana who played the role of Uttara, with Vakil playing Abhimanyu. The film apparently included flashbacks in Indian cinema for the first time.

== A-C ==
Title	Director	Cast	Genre	Notes Cinematographer
Ahiravan Mahiravan Vadha	G. V. Sane	Bhaurao Datar, Bachu Pawar, Shanta Nalgunde, Ghanshyam Singh, Sane	Mythology	Hindustan Cinema Film Company, Nasik; DOP: Anna Salunke
Ajamil	Kanjibhai Rathod	Khalil, Jamna, Homi Master, Gangaram	Devotional	Kohinoor Film Company
Andhare Alo a.k.a. The Influence Of Love	Naresh Mitra, Sisir Kumar Bhaduri	Durga Rani, Lila Debi, Sisir Kumar Bhaduri, Naresh Mitra, Jogesh Choudhury, Kankabati	Social Drama	Taj Mahal Film Company Ltd., Calcutta; DOP: Noni Gopal Sanyal
Ashoka a.k.a. Samrat Ashoka			Historical	Madan Theatres Ltd.
Bhakta Ambarish	Kanjibhai Rathod	Khalil, Tara, R. N. Vaidya	Devotional	Kohinoor Film Company; DOP: Gajanan S. Deware
Bhakta Shiromani a.k.a. Rajrishi Ambarish a.k.a. Bhakta Shiromani	Dadasaheb Phalke		Devotional	Hindustan Cinema Film Company, Nasik
Bhartrahari a.k.a. King Bhartrahari	S. N. Patankar	Tara Koregaonkar, Thatte	Legend	National Film Company; DOP: S. N. Patankar
Bhishma	Jyotish Bannerjee	Master Mohan, Keki Adjania	Mythology	Madan Theatres Ltd.
Bhishma Bana Shayya		Madanrai Vakil	Mythology	Star Films Ltd. DOP: Vishnu B. Joshi
Bhishma Pratigna	R. S. Prakash		Mythology	Star Of The East Film Co.
Bidyasundar a.k.a. The Lover's Trance	Sundar Narayan Ray	Durgarani	Legend	Aurora Film Company, Calcutta; DOP: Debi Ghosh
Bimata a.k.a. Bijoy Basant a.k.a. Stepmother	Dhirendranath Ganguly	Seeta Devi, Dhirendranath Ganguly, Miss Joy Billy	Social	Lotus Film Co.
Bisha Briksha a.k.a. Bishabriksha a.k.a. Poison Tree	Jyotish Bannerjee	Durgadas Bannerjee, Miss Light, Basantakumari, Manoranjan Bhattacharya, Gopalchandra Bhattacharya, Lila Debi, Kartik Dey	Social Drama	Madan Theatres Ltd. DOP: Jatin Das
Bodana a.k.a. Bhakta Bodhana a.k.a. Shri Ranchhodrai	S. N. Patankar	Raja Sandow	Legend Devotional	National Film Company

== D-M ==
Title	Director	Cast	Genre	Notes Cinematographer
Damaji a.k.a. Bhakta Damaji a.k.a. Bhagwata Bhakta Damaji	Baburao Painter	Baburao Pendharkar, Sushilabai, Gulabbai, Ravji M. Haskar, N. D. Sarpotdar, Zunzharrao Pawar, Ganpat Bakre	Devotional	Maharashtra Film Company, Kolhapur; DOP: S. Fattelal
Devi Todi	Kanjibhai Rathod	Jamna	Devotional	Kohinoor Film Company; DOP: Gajanan S. Deware
Doom Of The Yadavas a.k.a. Yadav Vinas			Mythology	Star Films Ltd. DOP: Vishnu B. Joshi
Draupadi Swayamwar	Vishnupant Divekar	Kamala	Mythology	Bharat Cinema Film Company
Draupadi Veni Bandhan a.k.a. The Fall Of The Kauravas a.k.a. Veni Bandhan	Vishnupant Divekar	S. N. Patankar, Damle, Soni	Mythology	Bharat Cinema Film Company; DOP: A. P. Karandikar
Gangavataran a.k.a. Bhagirathi Ganga		Patience Cooper, Dadibhai Sarkari	Mythology	Madan Theatres Ltd.
Hara Gouri a.k.a. Lord Shiva And Parvati	Dhirendranath Ganguly		Religious	Lotus Film Company
Hari Talika	G. V. Sane	Bhaurao Datar	Mythology	Hindustan Cinema Film Co., Nasik; DOP: Anna Salunke
Indrajit a.k.a. Indrajit O Lady Teacher	Dhirendranath Ganguly	Seeta Devi, Dhirendranath Ganguly	Social	Lotus Film Company
Jadunath	S. N. Patankar	Tara Koregaonkar, K. G. Gokhale, Baba Vyas, Trimbakrao Pradhan, Kelkar	Legend	National Film Company; DOP: S. N. Patankar
Kalidas	S. N. Patankar	Tara Koregaonkar, Baba Vyas	Biopic Devotional	National Film Company; DOP: S. N. Patankar
Karna a.k.a. Deserted Son Of Kunti	S. N. Patankar	Raja Sandow	Mythology	National Film Company; DOP: S. N. Patankar
Lady Teacher	Dhirendranath Ganguly		Comedy	Lotus Film Company
Laila Majnu	J. J. Madan	Patience Cooper, H. W. Waring, Miss Dot Foy, Jeanetta Sherwin	Romantic Legend	Madan Theatres Ltd.
Mahashweta Kadambari a.k.a. Shap Sambhram	S. N. Patankar	Tara Koregaonkar, Baba Vyas, Thatte, S. N. Patankar	Mythology	National Film Company; DOP: S. N. Patankar
Malati Madhav	Kanjibhai Rathod	Khalil, Tara, R. N. Vaidya, Miss Moti, Gangaram	Mythology	Kohinoor Film Company; DOP: Gajanan S. Deware

== P-R ==
Title	Director	Cast	Genre	Notes Cinematographer
Pandavas In Exile a.k.a. Pandav Vanavas	G. V. Sane	Bhaurao Datar, Bachu Pawar, Sakharam Jadhav	Mythology	Hindustan Cinema Film Company, Nasik; DOP: Anna Salunke
Parikshit		Vithaldas Panchotia	Mythology	
Parsuram			Mythology	
Pati Bhakti a.k.a. Pavitra Leelavati a.k.a. Husband Worship	J. J. Madan	Patience Cooper, Master Mohan, Signorina F. Manelli, Manilal, Sayed Hussain	Social Drama	Madan Theatres Ltd.
Pitroddhar a.k.a. Ganga The Redeemer	Manilal Joshi		Mythology	Star Films Ltd.
Princess Budur a.k.a. Rajkumari Budur a.k.a. Tale Of Kamar-Al-Zaman	J. J. Madan	Patience Cooper, Eugenio De Liguoro, Dorothy Bayley, Edna Dalies, Dadibhai Sarkari, Chapgar	Costume Fantasy	Madan Theatres Ltd.
Radha Vilas	Vishnupant Divekar	V. Y. Datar, Soni	Mythology	Bharat Cinema Film Company; DOP: A. P. Karandikar
Raja Bhoj		Patience Cooper, Albertina	Legend	Madan Theatres Ltd.
Raja Parikshit a.k.a. Janmejaya's Serpent Sacrifice	Manilal Joshi	Miss Yakbal	Mythology	Star Films Ltd. DOP: Vishnu B. Joshi
Ramayana	Jyotish Bannerjee	Patience Cooper, Master Bhagaban Das, Signorina F. Mannelli	Religious Epic	Madan Theatres Ltd. DOP: Eugenio De Liguoro
Ratnavali a.k.a. The Lady From Lanka	Manilal Joshi	Miss Yakbal, Elizer	Legend Mythology	Star Films Ltd. DOP: Vishnu B. Joshi
Ratnavali a.k.a. Ratnabali a.k.a. Sea Nymph Of Ceylon	Jyotish Bannerjee, C. Legrand	Patience Cooper, Miss Gohar, Miss Albertina, C. Legrand, Pandit Tulsidutt Saida	Legend Mythology	Madan Theatres Ltd. DOP: C. Legrand

== S-Z ==
Title	Director	Cast	Genre	Notes Cinematographer
Sadhu Aur Shaitan	Nitish Lahiri, Dhirendranath Ganguly	Dhirendranath Ganguly, Lina Valentine, Sushilabala, Manmatha Pal	Comedy	Lotus Film Company, Indo-British Film Co., Calcutta; DOP: Jyotish Sarkar
Sant Namdev a.k.a. Saint Namdeo	Dadasaheb Phalke		Devotional	Hindustan Cinema Film Company, Nasik; DOP: Anna Salunke
Sant Sakhubai	G. V. Sane	Shanta Nalgunde, Visubhau Nirantar	Devotional	Hindustan Cinema Film Company, Nasik; DOP: Anna Salunke
Sati a.k.a. Kalighat a.k.a. Daksha Yagna a.k.a. Origin Of Mahakali Temple		Patience Cooper	Mythology	Madan Theatres Ltd
Sati Anjani a.k.a. Birth Of Hanuman	S. N. Patankar	Tara Koregaonkar, C. C. Shah	Biopic Devotional	National Film Company; DOP: S. N. Patankar
Sati Toral	Kanjibhai Rathod	Khalil, Sakina, Miss Moti, Gani Babu	Devotional	Kohinoor Film Company; DOP: Gajanan S. Deware
Satya Narayan	V. S. Nirantar	Anna Salunke, Shinde		Hindustan Cinema Film Company, Nasik; DOP: Anna Salunke
Sharmista Devyani			Puranic Drama	Bharat Cinema Film Company; DOP: A. P. Karandikar
Shishupal Vadh a.k.a. The Killing Of Shishupal	G. V. Sane	Bhaurao Datar, Bachu Pawar, Sonabai, Sane	Mythology	Hindustan Cinema Film Company, Nasik; DOP: Anna Salunke
Shri Ganesh Janma a.k.a. Ganesh Avatar	G. V. Sane	Bhaurao Datar, Madhav Malasure		Hindustan Cinema Film Company, Nasik; DOP: Anna Salunke
Shri Markandeya Avtar a.k.a. Shiv Mahima a.k.a. Devotion's Reward	S. N. Patankar	Damle, C. C. Shah, Baba Vyas	Devotional	National Film Company; DOP: S. N. Patankar
Shri Satya Narayan	Kanjibhai Rathod	Khalil, Sakina, Miss Moti, R. N. Vaidya, Tara Gani Babu, Raja Babu	Devotional	Kohinoor Film Company; DOP: D. D. Dabke
Sukanya Savitri	Kanjibhai Rathod	Sakina, Miss Moti, Jamna	Devotional	Kohinoor Film Company; DOP: D. D. Dabke
Suryakumari	Narayan Deware	Khalil, Tara, Miss Moti, Raja Sandow	Costume	Kohinoor Film Company
Tara The Dancer a.k.a. Nartaki Tara	J. J. Madan	Patience Cooper, Miss Chandra, Prabhodh Chandra Bose	Social	Madan Theatres Ltd. DOP: Charles Creed
Veer Abhimanyu	Manilal Joshi	Sultana, Fatma Begum, Madanrai Vakil	Mythology	Star Films Ltd.
Virat Parva	Vishnupant Divekar	V. Y. Datar, Soni	Mythology	Bharat Cinema Film Company; DOP: A. P. Karandikar
