= Bhakta Prahlada =

Bhakta Prahlada means "devotee Prahlada", a devotional character in Hindu mythology. It may refer to:

- Bhakta Prahlada (1932 film)
- Bhakta Prahlada (1942 Telugu film)
- Bhakta Prahlada (1942 Kannada film)
- Bhakta Prahlad (1946 film), Hindi film
- Bhakta Prahlad (1958 film), Assamese film
- Bhakta Prahlada (1958 film), Kannada film
- Bhakta Prahlada (1967 film), Telugu film
- Bhakta Prahlada (1983 film), Kannada film

== See also ==
- Prahlada (disambiguation)
  - Prahlada (film), Malayalam film made in 1941
  - Prahalada (film), Tamil film made in 1939
