= Kalyani (1940 film) =

- Directed by: Premankur Atorthy
- Produced by: Mansukh Pictures
- Starring: Rattan Bai; W. M. Khan; Ghulam Mohammed; Jamshedji
- Music by: H. C. Bali
- Production company: Mansukh Pictures
- Release date: 1940
- Country: India
- Language: Hindi

Kalyani is a 1940 Hindi social film directed by Premankur Atorthy. It was produced by Mansukh Pictures. The music direction was by H. C. Bali. The cast of the film included Rattan Bai, W. M. Khan, Ghulam Mohammed, Jamshedji and Mukhtar.

== Cast ==
- Ratan Bai
- W. M. Khan
- Ghulam Mohomed
- Jamshedji
- Mukhtar
- Sayed Ahmed
- Zilloo
- Kesar

== Songs ==
Song list

- "Aayi Aayi Raat Suhani Aayi"
- "Aisa Geet Sunaoon Sajan"
- "Dukh Ki Nadiya Jeevan Naiya"
- "Hans Lo Hans Lo Jee Bhar Ke Hans Lo"
- "Gar Saqi Chala Jaaye Piye Ja Piye Ja"
- "Bebas Hai Man Ranj Na Jaye"
- "Jeevan Hai Ujadi Phulwadi"
- "Keh Rahi Hai Hame Who Ankh Sharmayi Hui"
- "Mujhko Bhul Na Jana Pritam"
