= Malan (film) =

- Starring: Alaknanda; Rattan Bai
- Release date: 1942
- Country: India
- Language: Hindi

Malan (film) is a Bollywood film. It was released in 1942.

== Cast ==
- Jagdish Sethi
- Shanta
- Balwant Singh
- Kalyani
- Alakhnanda
- Ratan Bai
