= Kapalkundala Temple =

Temple in West Bengal

- কপালকুণ্ডলা মন্দির
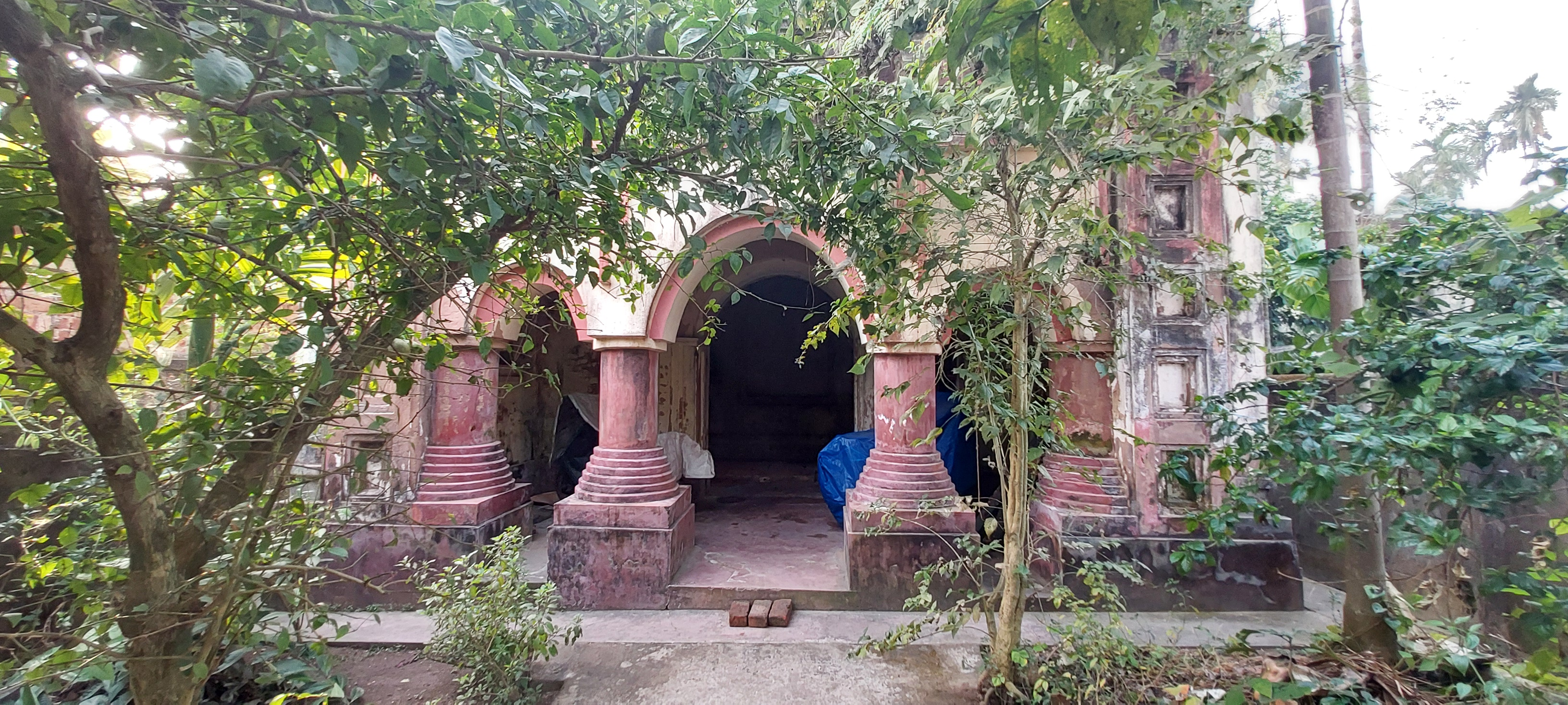
- Kapalkundala Temple at Dariapur

Religion
- Deity: Kali

Location
- Location: Dariapur, Purba Medinipur district, West Bengal
- Country: India

Architecture
- Type: Temple
- Designated: 28 February 2006

Kapalkundala Temple is a Hindu temple dedicated to the goddess Kali situated at Dariapur, Deshapran community development block in Purba Medinipur district in the Indian state of West Bengal. The temple was declared a heritage site by the West Bengal Heritage Commission in 2006 for its cultural significance.

== History ==
The temple is closely associated with the literary work of Bankim Chandra Chattopadhyay's Kapalkundala, published in 1866. During his tenure as Deputy Magistrate in Contai subdivision, Chattopadhyay was inspired to write the novel. The story of which is set in the then forests around Dariapur. According to local tradition, the temple represents the shrine of the goddess Kali where the fictional Tantric rituals were performed.

== Gallery ==
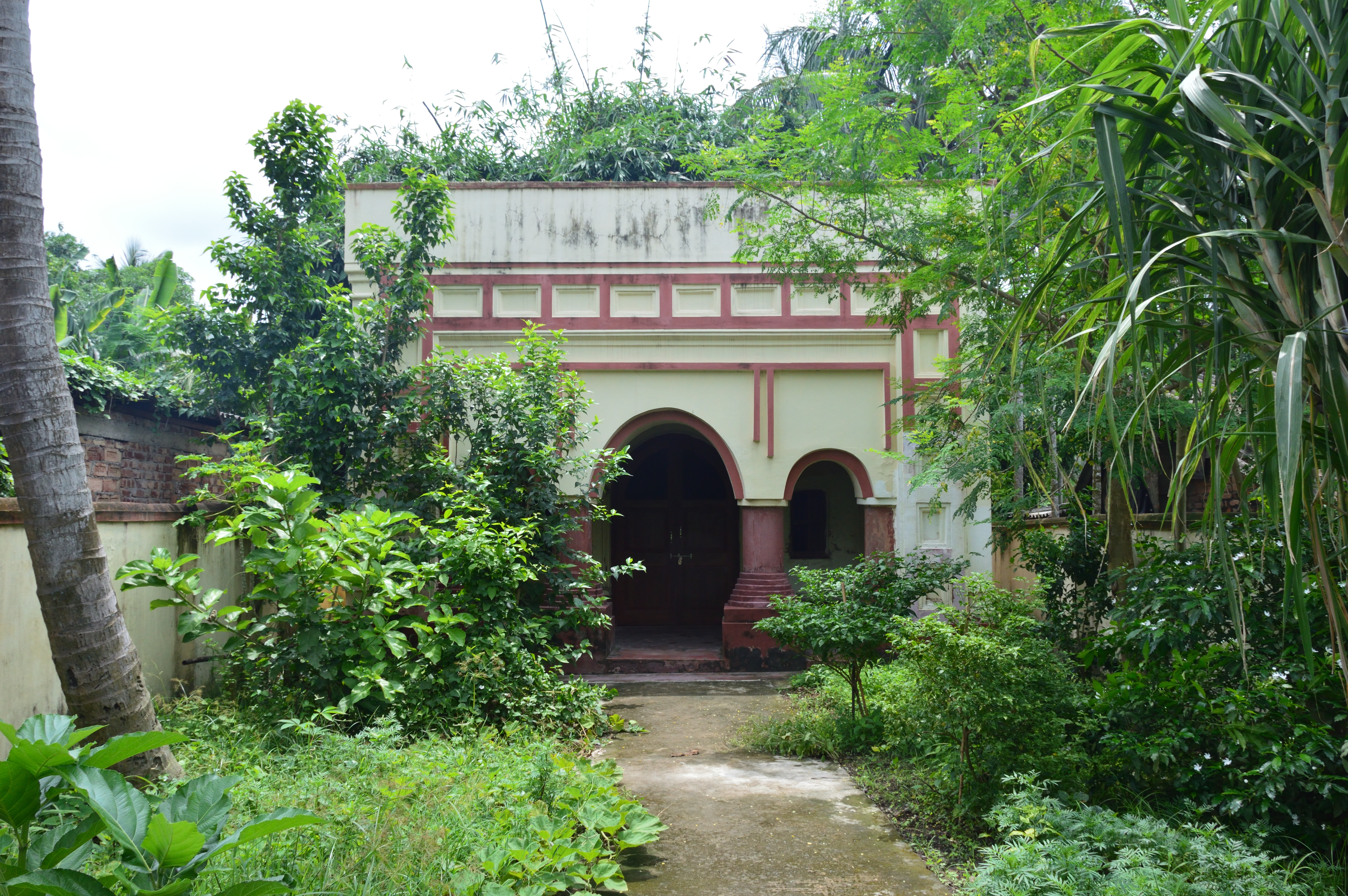

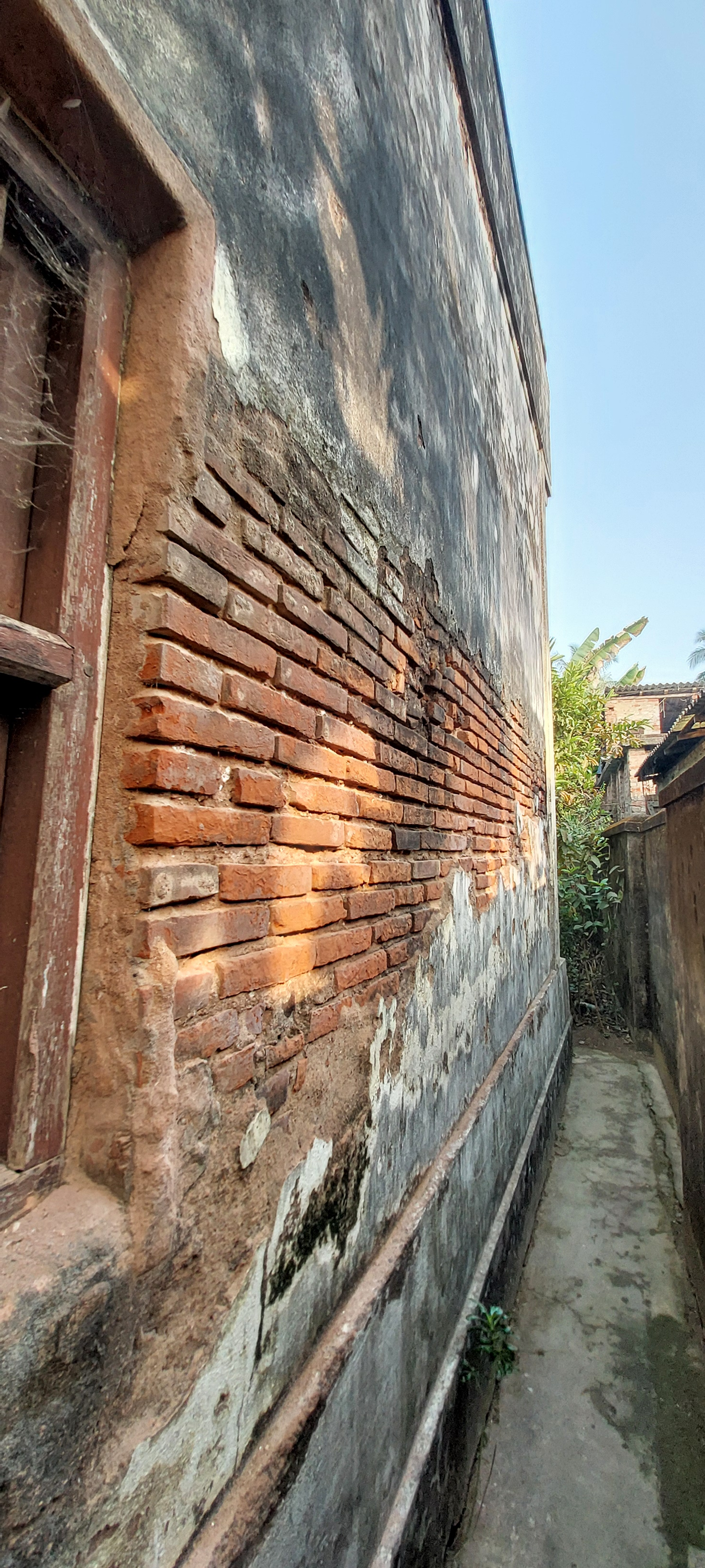

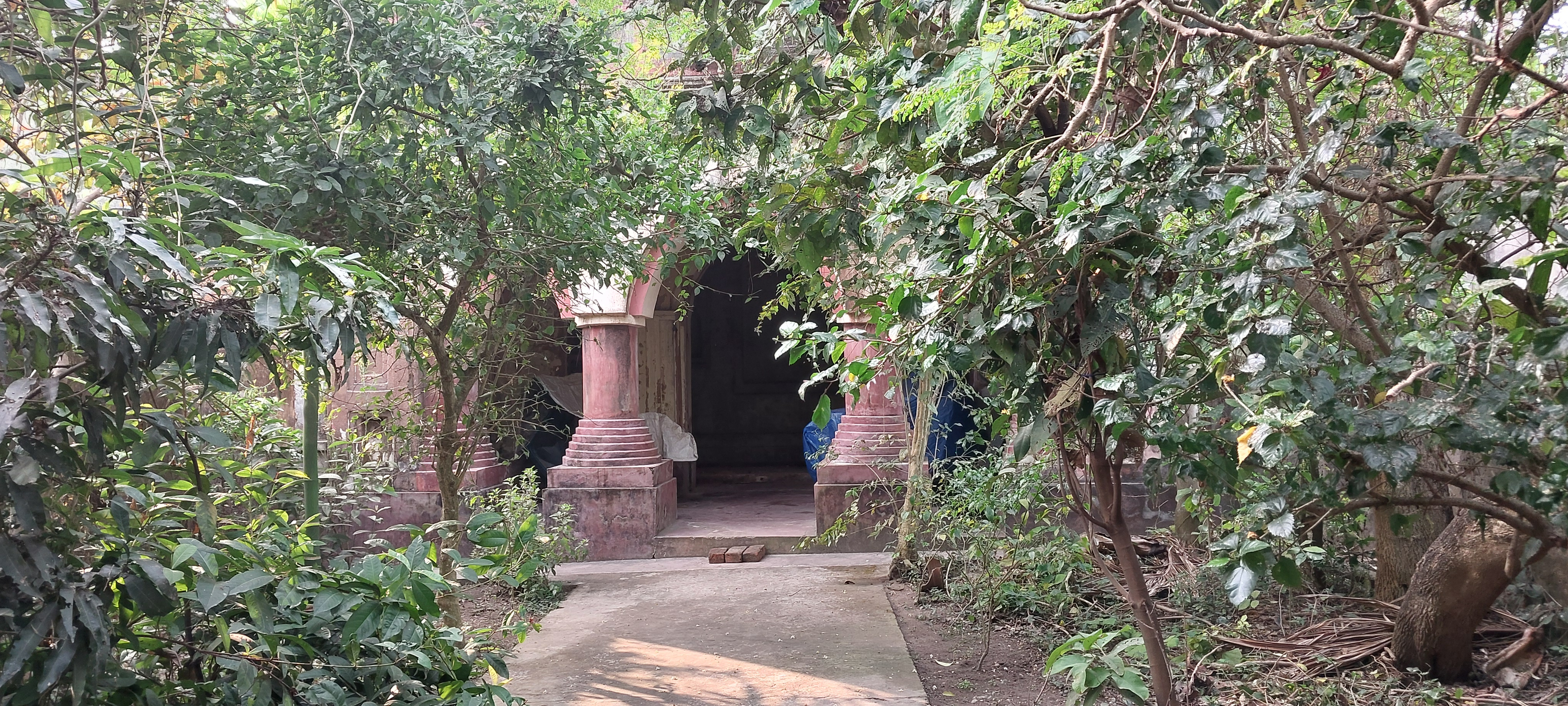
