= Sudhar Prem =

- Directed by: Premankur Atorthy
- Produced by: New Theatres
- Starring: Asit Baran; Sandhya Devi; Manoranjan Bhattacharya; Shyam Laha
- Cinematography: Prabhat Ghosh; Prabhodh Das
- Music by: Pranab Dey
- Production companies: New Theatres, Ltd.
- Distributed by: New Theaters Eastern Distributors
- Release date: 1950
- Running time: 159 minutes
- Country: India
- Language: Bengali

Sudhar Prem (Sudha's Love) is a 1950 Indian Bengali film directed by Premankur Atorthy. Produced by New Theatres the music was composed by Pranab Dey. The cinematography was by Prabhat Ghosh and Prabhodh Das. The cast included Asit Baran, Manoranjan Bhattacharya, Lila Dasgupta, Sandhya Devi and Shyam Laha.

== Cast ==
- Asit Baran
- Manoranjan Bhattacharya
- Lila Dasgupta
- Sandhya Devi
- Shyam Laha
- Haren Mukherjee
- Naresh Mitra
- Khagen Pathak
- Haridhan Mukherjee
- Kali Sarkar
