= Satya Pathe =

- Directed by: Amar Choudhury
- Starring: Jahar Gangopadhyay; Amar Chowdhury; Dhiraj Bhattacharya; Ashu Bose
- Release date: 1935
- Country: India
- Language: Bengali

Satya Pathe is a 1935 Bengali film directed by Amar Choudhury.

The film was the last production of Madan Theatre.

== Cast ==
- Jahar Gangopadhyay
- Amar Chowdhury
- Dhiraj Bhattacharya
- Ashu Bose
- Chittaranjan Goswami
- Chunibala
- Dolly Dutta
- Indubala
- Kartik Roy
- Kiran Ray
- Tarakumar Bhattacharya
