= Dulhan (1938 film) =

- Directed by: Premankur Atorthy
- Produced by: Imperial Film Company
- Starring: Rattan Bai; W. M. Khan; Ghulam Mohammed; Jilloobai
- Production company: Imperial Film Company
- Release date: 1938
- Country: India
- Language: Hindi

Dulhan (The Bride) is a 1938 social Hindi film directed by Premankur Atorthy. It was produced by the Imperial Film Company. The music direction was by Ram Gopal Pande. The film starred Rattan Bai, W. M. Khan, Ghulam Mohammed and Jilloobai.

== Cast ==
- Rattan Bai
- W. M. Khan
- Ghulam Mohammed
- Jilloobai
