= Amar Mullick =

Indian film director (1899–1972)

Amar Maillick
- অমর মল্লিক
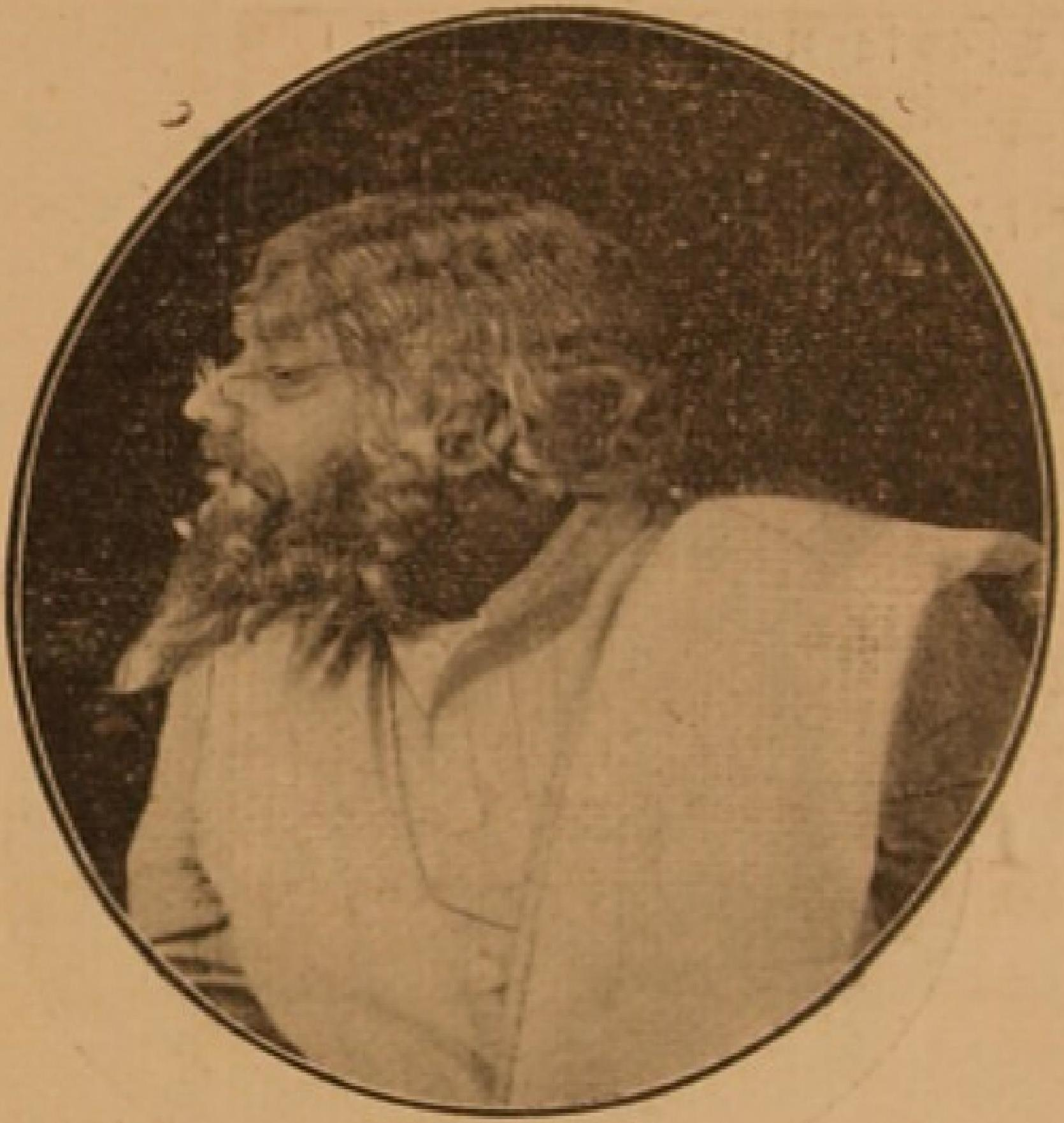
- Mullick in 1932
- Born: May 1899; Calcutta, British India
- Died: January 1972 (aged 72); Calcutta, India
- Occupations: Actor, film director
- Spouse: Bharati Devi

Amar Mullick (May 1899 – August 1972) was an Indian actor and director.

== Career ==
Mullick was born in 1899 in Kolkata, British India. Although he was a civil engineer by profession, he was passionate about films. He joined New Theatres group in 1932 and worked with Premankur Atorthy. He acted in several Bengali and Hindi films usually playing side roles. Mullick created his own Amar Mullick Productions and became popular as director. He married actress Bharati Devi.

== Partial filmography ==
- Chorekanta
- Dena Paona
- Sandigdha
- Punarjanma
- Chirakumar Sabha
- Kapalkundala
- Devdas
- Abasheshe
- Karodpati
- Grihadah
- Mukti
- Sathi
- Sandhya
- Haar Jeet
- Sesh Raksha
- Biraj Bou
- Swami Vivekananda
- Samapti
- Durgesh Nandini (1951 film)
- Chheley Kaar
- Shap Mochan
- Louha-Kapat
- Parash Pathar
- Chaowa Pawa
- Shashi Babur Sansar
- Mriter Martye Agaman
- Personal Assistant
- Prabesh Nishedh
- Kathin Maya
- Kancher Swarga
- Shudhu Ekti Bachhar
- Uttar Purush
