= Chirakumar Sabha =

1932 film

- Directed by: Premankur Atorthy
- Produced by: Dilip Pictures
- Starring: Durgadas Bannerjee; Molina Devi; Tinkari Chakraborty
- Cinematography: Nitin Bose
- Music by: R. C. Boral
- Production company: Dilip Pictures
- Distributed by: New Theatres
- Release date: 1932
- Running time: 159 min
- Country: India
- Language: Bengali

Chirakumar Sabha (English: A Conference of Bachelors) is a 1932 Indian Bengali drama film directed by Premankur Atorthy. The music of the film was composed by R. C. Boral who used Tagore's songs as lyrics. It was one of the first of Rabindranath Tagore's works to be made into a film. The film was remade in 1956 by Debaki Bose.

== Plot ==
The story revolves around a group of hardened bachelors who meet on a regular basis, and eventually settle for marriage. Purna is a newcomer to the group of bachelors at Professor Chandra Basu's house. Also attending are three other bachelors Akshay, Bipin and Shirish. Alshay is ousted from the committee when he gets married. He suggests that all members meet at his place instead. Nirmala, the Professor's daughter also joins the crowd becoming the only female member. Purna is attracted to Nirmala and suggests marriage, which Nirmala refuses. Akshay has three sisters Shailabala a child widow, Nripabala and Nirabala. His mother is busy fixing matches for Nripabala and Nirabala. Finally the two sisters are matched with Shirish and Bipin, while Nirmala and Purna get together.

== Cast ==
- Durgadas Bannerjee as Purna
- Molina Devi as Nirmala
- Amar Mullick as Professor Chandra Basu
- Tinkari Chakraborty as Akshay
- Phani Burma as Bipin
- Indu Mukherjee as Shirish
- Suniti as Nirabala
- Anupama as Nripabala
- Manoranjan Bhattacharya as Rasik
- Dhiren Bannerjee as Darukeshwar
- Nibhanani Debi as Shailabala
- Dhani Dutta
