= Durgesh Nandini (1951 film) =

- দুর্গেশনন্দিনী
- Directed by: Amar Mullick
- Story by: Bankim Chandra Chattopadhyay
- Based on: Durgeshnandini by Bankim Chandra Chattopadhyay
- Starring: Chhabi Biswas; Chandrabati Devi; Kamal Mitra; Manoranjan Bhattacharya
- Production company: Rupayan Theatres
- Distributed by: East End Films
- Release date: 1951
- Country: India
- Language: Bengali

Durgesh Nandini is a Bengali historical romance drama film directed by Amar Mullick based on Bankim Chandra Chattopadhyay's 1865 Durgeshnandini. It was released on 7 June 1951 under the banner of Rupayan Theaters.

== Plot ==
The movie is set on the backdrop of the 16th-century Mughal era conflict in Bengal during the reign of Akbar. Jagat Singh, a Rajput general of the Mughal army and son of Raja Man Singh, is sent to investigate Pathan military activities in Bengal. He meets and falls in love with Tilottama.

== Cast ==
- Chhabi Biswas as Katlu Khan
- Manoranjan Bhattacharya as Abhiram Swami
- Chandrabati Devi as Bimala
- Kamal Mitra as Birendra Singha
- Amar Mullick as Man Singha
- Bharati Devi as Ayesha
- Lilabati Karali
- Nitish Mukhopadhyay as Osman
- Priti Majumadar
- Manju Bandyopadhyay
