= Radha Krishna (1933 film) =

1933 film by Priyanath Ganguly and Tulsi Lahiri

Radha Krishna or Kalanka Bhanjan is a Bengali religious film directed by Priyanath Ganguly and Tulsi Lahiri. This film was released in 1933 in the banner of Bharat Laxmi Film Company.

== Plot ==
This film is based on Indian Mythological love story of Radha and Krishna.

== Cast ==
- Shreemati Lakshmi as Krishna
- Duniyabala as Radha
- Bimal Dasgupta as Ayaan Ghosh
- Shreemati Suhasini as Yashoda
- Manindra Bose as Nanda
- Amar Choudhary as Gokul
- Shreemati Niradasundari as Jatila
- Kshirodgopal Mukherjee as Narada
- Shreemati Saraswati as Kutila
