= Himangshu Dutta =

- হিমাংশু দত্ত
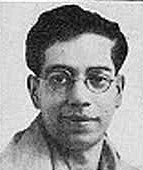
- Himangshu Dutta
- Born: Himangshu Kumar Dutta; 1908; Comilla, Eastern Bengal and Assam, British India
- Died: 15 November 1944 (aged 36); Calcutta, Bengal Presidency, British India
- Occupations: Music composer, music director, singer, musician

Himangshu Dutta (Bengali: হিমাংশু দত্ত; 1908 – 15 November 1944) was a Bengali music director. Amongst several contemporary legendary composers of his time as Rabindranath Tagore, Kazi Nazrul Islam, and Atulprasad Sen, Dutta is renowned for his unique and melodious composition of music. Songs composed by him is usually known as "Himangshu Dutta-er Gaan" (songs of Himangshu Dutta). The Saraswat Samaj of Dhaka awarded him the title 'Surasagar' (Sea of Music) for his contribution to Bengali music. He himself was an accomplished singer as well.

== Early life ==
Himangshu Dutta was born in Comilla (now in Bangladesh) in 1908, to Jogendrachandra Dutta and Nirada Devi. He was the fifth child of the couple. After receiving primary and secondary education at Comilla and passing the entrance examination from Comilla Zilla School in 1924, he came to Kolkata and joined Presidency College to get the ISC degree. He received his bachelor's degree from Vidyasagar College under Calcutta University.

Jogendrachandra was very fond of music and many eminent musicians of Comilla used to visit his house in a regular manner. This not only helped child Himangshu to listen quality classical music at his very young age but also to get closer to various forms of music like Dhrupad, Khayal, Ghazal, Lokogiti, and other various local music forms of Comilla.

Himangshu Dutta's mother was also a noted singer of that time and she used to sing Rabindrasangeet to her sons and daughters. Himangshu Dutta received the first lessons of music from his mother.

Himangshu Dutta learned Dhrupad from Acharya Shyamacharan Dutta and Bhajan from Ustad Khasru Miya, and Pandit Khitimohan Sensashtri. He also received training on classical music from his elder brother Shachindra Dutta.

== Journey as musician ==
Before reaching his teenage, Himangshu Dutta started singing Brahmasangeet and Bhajan in different local functions at Comilla.

In the year 1922 Himangshu Dutta composed music for a song whose lyric was written by his classmate Subodh Purkayastha. Himangshu sang the song in a function of his school. The duo, Himangshu and Subodh, later gave the Bengali audience a vast number of super-hit songs.

In 1923 Rabindranath Tagore visited Comilla and the young boy sang Rabindrasangeet in a public function in front of Rabindranath Tagore. Rabindranath appreciated it very much.

Beside having a deep interest in music composition, Himangshu Dutta was an avid notation writer from the very young age. He wrote notations for various musicians including Atulprasad Sen and Rabindranath Tagore. Maestros like Pankaj Kumar Mullick also mentioned this in his writing.

In 1928, Himangshu met singer Dr. Sudhamadhab Dutta. Next year, Dr. Dutta sang two songs composed by Himangshu at All India Radio, Kolkata. This is possibly the first occurrence at which Bengali audience got the taste of Himangshu Dutta over radio. From this point onwards, Sudhamadhab continued singing "Himangshu Dutta-er Gaan", broadcast by All India Radio every Sunday.

In the year 1931 Gramophone Company of India released the first record based on the composition of Himangshu Dutta. The artist was Haripada Roy. In the same year, the company also published another record from its His Master's Voice division where Sati Devi was the singer, and Himangshu emerged as a star in the history of so-called modern Bengali songs.

Himangshu started using both Indian classical music and western harmony to bring a complete new type of music in the history of Bengali music composition. Beside composing music for basic Bengali, Ghazal, and Ragapradhan, he also composed music for a number of Bengali as well as Hindi film songs. In the year 1934, he entered the world of film industry through the film called "Taruni". In the next ten years he worked as composers in many Bengali as well as Hindi films.

Himangshu Dutta composed music for various lyricists like Subodh Purokayastha, Ajay Bhattacharyya, Sailen Roy, Sunirmal Basu, Mamata Mitra, Premendra Mitra, Binay Mukhopadhyay, Pranab Roy and many others. He also composed music for Kazi Nazrul Islam. Almost all renowned singers of that time — Haripada Roy, Umapada Bhattacharyya, Sati Devi, Kanak Das, Saila Devi, Sabitri Ghosh, Tarapada Chakraborty, Suprava Sarkar, Supriti Ghosh, Jaganmoy Mitra, at some point of their musical career, recorded "Himangshu Dutta-er Gaan". Himangshu's fame as a composer went beyond his generation, which is reflected by the fact that artists like Hemanta Kumar Mukhopadhyay, Sachin Dev Burman, Sandhya Mukhopadhyay, Pratima Bandopadhyay, Shyamal Mitra, Manabendra Mukhopadhyay, Aarti Mukherjee, Kabir Suman also recorded his songs.

His compositions for songs like "Aloko Andhar Jetha Kore Khela", "Alo Chaya Dola", Champa Chameli Beli", "Chand Kohe Chameli Go", "Chameli Melo Ankhi", "Tumi Je Andhar", "Tomari Potho Pane Chahi", "Nishithe Chole Himelo Bai", "Boroshar Megh Name", "Bidayer Sesh Bani", "Birohini Chiro Birohini", "Jodi Dokhina Pobono Ashiya", "Rater Deule Jage", and many others were Bengali musical hits.

Himangshu Dutta died on 15 November 1944 at the age of 36.

== Filmography ==
Film name	Year
Taruni	1934
Dakhyajagya	1934
Tulshidas	1934
Bidrohi	1935
Pravash Milan	1935
Avhinay	1938
Parashmani	1939
Rukmini	1939
Swami Stri	1940
Path Bhule	1940
Abatar	1941
Sri Radha	1941
Nandini	1941
Bhakta Kabir	1942
Jiban Sangini	1942
Pati Puja	1943
Bhai Chara	1943
Avisar	1943
Janani	1943
Paper Pathe	1943
Samaj	1944
Sandhya	1944
Bandita	1945
Griha Laxmi	1945
