= Swami Vivekananda (1955 film) =

1955 film by Amar Mullick

- Directed by: Amar Mullick
- Produced by: Amar Mullick
- Release date: 1955
- Country: India
- Language: Hindi

Swami Vivekananda is a 1955 Hindi language Indian feature film produced and directed by Amar Mullick, starring Ajit Prakash, Bharati Devi, Anubha Gupta Manoranjan Bhattachary etc. The film was based on the biography of Indian Hindu monk Swami Vivekananda. The film is considered a "faithful and memorable documentation feature" on Vivekananda.

== Plot ==
The eventful life of Swami Vivekananda, his teachings, thoughts, contribution towards society and his relation with his teacher Ramakrishna Paramahamsa are shown in this film. The film has captured different events from his life starting from his childhood days to his college days, meeting with his master Ramakrishna at Dakshineswar, relationship with Ramakrishna, austerities undertaken by him and other monastic disciples of Ramakrishna, etc.

== Cast ==
The film, directed by Amar Mullick has the following main cast.

- Ajit Prakash
- Bharati Devi
- Anubha Gupta
- Manoranjan Bhattacharya

== Production ==
The film was produced by Amar Mallick Productions and directed by Amar Mallick). The music of the film was composed by Rai Chand Boral (known as R.C. Boral) of the New Theatres and Salil Choudhury.

== Soundtracks ==
There are three soundtracks sung by Talat Mahmood and Mohammed Rafi.

No.	Title	Lyrics	Singer(s)	Length
1.	"Hey Shivshambho Hey Tripurari"	Shankar Sen	Mohammed Rafi	2:53
2.	"Abhimaan Ko Mere Chur Karo"	Shankar Sen	Talat Mahmood	3:13

== Release and reception ==
The film was released in 1955 and received mainly positive reviews from critics. According to The Indian Express, the film is a "faithful and memorable documentation feature" on Swami Vivekananda. T. M. Ramachandran, wrote in his book 70 years of Indian cinema, 1913-1983, that the film "will ever remain enshrined in the memories of the viewers. The film brought to graphic view the exploits of this cyclonic sage of India".

== See also ==
- Bireswar Vivekananda, 1964 Bengali film
