= Tritiya Paksha =

1931 Bengali short film

- Directed by: Amar Chowdhury
- Cinematography: Jatin Dad; T. Marconi
- Production company: Madan Theatres Ltd.
- Release date: 1931 (Kolkata)
- Country: India
- Language: Bengali

Tritiya Paksha (1931) is a Bengali short film directed by Amar Chowdhury. The film was made under Madan Theatres Ltd. banner.

== Cast ==
- Amar Chowdhury
- Jatin Singha
- Kshirodgopal Mukhopadhyay
- Ms. Golap
- Ms. Golela

== See also ==
- Jamai Sasthi (film)
