= Durgeshnandini =

Novel by Bankim Chandra Chattopadhyay

- Author: Bankim Chandra Chattopadhyay
- Original title: দুর্গেশনন্দিনী
- Language: Bengali
- Genre: Novel
- Publication date: 1865
- Publication place: India
- Media type: Print

Durgeshnandini (Bengali: দুর্গেশনন্দিনী, lit. 'Daughter of the Feudal Lord') is a Bengali historical romance novel written by Indian writer Bankim Chandra Chattopadhyay in 1865. Durgeshnandini is a story of the love triangle between Jagat Singh, a Mughal Empire general, Tilottama, the daughter of a Bengali feudal lord and Ayesha, the daughter of a rebel Pathan leader against whom Jagat Singh was fighting. The story is set against the backdrop of Pathan-Mughal conflicts that took place in south-western region of modern-day Indian state of Paschimbanga (West Bengal) during the reign of Akbar.

Durgeshnandini is the first Bengali novel written by Bankim Chandra as well as the first major Bengali novel in the history of Bengali literature. The story of the novel was borrowed from some local legends of Arambag region, Hooghly district, Paschimbanga, collected by Bankim Chandra’s great-uncle. Although the conservative critics mocked the lucidity of Bankim Chandra’s language, Durgeshnandini was highly praised by most of the contemporary scholars and newspapers.

== Synopsis ==
The story is set in the backdrop of Pathan-Mughal conflicts that took place in south-western region of modern-day Indian state of Paschimbanga (West Bengal) during the reign of Akbar. Jagat Singh, a General of Mughal army and son of Raja Man Singh meets Tilottama, daughter of Birendra Singha, a feudal lord of south-western Bengal in Mandaran (in modern-day Hooghly district, West Bengal) and they fall in love with each other. While they are preparing for a marriage ceremony, Katlu Khan, a rebel Pathan leader attacks Mandaran. Birendra Singha dies in the battle and Jagat Singh is imprisoned along with Birendra’s widow Bimala and their daughter Tilottama. Katlu Khan’s daughter Ayesha saves Tilottama from her father’s lust, but Ayesha herself falls in love with Jagat Singh. Later, Bimala avenges her husband’s death by stabbing Katlu Khan. In the meantime, Man Singh signs a pact with the Pathans and they set Jagat Singh free. But Ayesha’s lover Osman challenges Jagat Singh in a duel which Jagat Singh wins. Realising that Jagat Singh who is a Hindu prince would never marry a Muslim woman, Ayesha gives up hope for him, but she eventually helps Tilottama marry Jagat Singh.

== Sources ==
Sukumar Sen commented, "Bhudev Mukharji’s Anguriyabinimay supplied the nucleus of the plot [of Durgeshnandini] which was modelled somewhat after Scott’s Ivanhoe."

Although, Bankim Chandra’s younger brother Purna Chandra Chattopadhyay stated that their great-uncle told Bankim Chandra of a popular legend of Mandaran which he collected from Bishnupur-Arambag region. According to the legend, the Pathans attacked the fort of the local feudal lord and took him and his wife and daughter to Orissa as prisoners and when Jagat Singh was sent to rescue them, he was also imprisoned. Bankim Chandra heard the story when he was 19 years old and after a few years he wrote Durgeshnandini.

Bankim Chandra himself dismissed any presumption of whether his novel was influenced by Ivanhoe, stating he never read Scott’s romance before writing Durgeshnandini. Asitkumar Bandyopadhyay also wrote that apart from the love-triangle between Jagat Singh, Ayesha and Tilottama which closely resembles that of Ivanhoe, Rebecca and Rowena in Ivanhoe, there is not much similarity between the two novels. He thus concluded that Durgeshnandini is Bankim Chandra’s original work.

== Date and text ==
13 editions of the novel were published during the lifetime of Bankim Chandra, the last being in 1893. It was translated into English (1882), Hindustani (1876), Hindi (1882) and Kannada (1885). It was first adopted for stage in 1873.

== Reception ==
Durgeshnandini received mixed response from contemporary critics. While the Sanskrit scholars of Bhatpara appreciated the novel, scholars of Calcutta did not. Dwarakanath Vidyabhushan, the editor of Somprakash mocked Bankim Chandra’s lucid language and unconventional style; although Sambad Prabhakar and some other contemporary newspapers highly praised the novel.

Sukumar Sen wrote, "…the tale was something that was wholly new and entirely delightful. The pseudo-historical background was a justification for a pure love romance intended for readers who knew only married love."

== In adaptation ==
=== Films ===
Bengali

- 1927: Durgesh Nandini, starring Durgadas Bannerjee, Kanu Bannerjee, Ahindra Choudhury, Indira Devi, Sita Devi, directed by Priyanath N. Ganguly.
- 1951: Durgesh Nandini, starring Manoranjan Bhattacharya, Chhabi Biswas, Bharati Devi, Chandrabati Devi, Kamal Mitra, directed by Amar Mullick.

Hindi

- 1956: Durgesh Nandini (1956 film), starring Pradeep Kumar, Bina Rai, Ajit, Nalini Jaywant directed by B. Mitra.

=== Television ===
- 2007: Durgesh Nandinii, starring Rinku Ghosh and Gurpreet Singh, aired on Sony TV. Only the title is borrowed with a different story.

=== Other ===
- It was adapted as a comic by Debrani Mitra in the 824th issue of the Indian comic book series, Amar Chitra Katha.
- On 11 June 2023, Radio Mirchi Kolkata station aired the novel in the Sunday Suspense programme. The novel was narrated and Directed by RJ Deep. Other RJs like Shankari Prasad Mitra, Debasmita, Godhuli, Debi, Pushpal, Somak, Rajiv Chatterjee, Mohor, etc. played some key roles.
