= Dena Paona =

1931 film

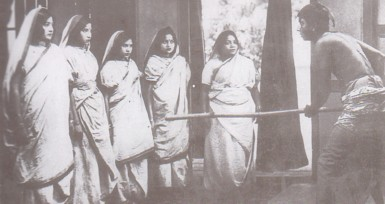
- A scene from Dena Paona (1931) – the first Bengali talkie
- Directed by: Premankur Atorthy
- Written by: Sarat Chandra Chattopadhyay
- Produced by: New Theatres
- Starring: Bhanu Bannerjee; Durgadas Bannerjee
- Cinematography: Nitin Bose
- Music by: Nripen Majumder; Raichand Boral
- Release date: 30 December 1931
- Country: India
- Language: Bengali

Dena Paona (Bengali: দেনা পাওনা; transl. Debts) is a Bengali drama film directed by Premankur Atorthy, starring Amar Mullick, Durgadas Bannerjee, Jahar Ganguly, Nibhanani Devi, and Bhanu Bandopadhyay. Based on a novel by Sarat Chandra Chattopadhyay and produced by New Theatres, it is credited as one of the first Bengali talkies, and along with Alam Ara, was one of the first sound films produced in India released on 30 December 1931. The film explored the ills of the dowry system and touched on the problems of female oppression in 19th-century Bengal.

== Plot ==
Jibananda is a drunkard Zamindar. Ekkari is his companion in all his sinful deeds and greed for money. Sorashi is the priestess in the local Chandi Temple and the estranged wife of Jibananda. She is adamant and stubborn, but responsible and honest, and has immense influence in certain sections of local society. When Sorashi was young, she was known as Alaka. Circumstances force Sorashi to stay all night in the drunk Jibananda's house. This created a ripple amongst the local villagers when they come to know about this incident. But Sorashi gave a legal statement to the police and Magistrate that she went to the Zamindar's house willingly. Jibananda was freed from all offences due to this statement. But the village leaders were very strict about their decision. Sarbeswar Shiromani, Mr. Chowdhury, and Janardan Roy decided not to assign the responsibility of a priestess of the temple to Sorashi any more. Nirmal, the son-in-law of Sabeswar Shiromani, is very impressed by the attitude and intelligence of Sorashi. Jibananda later tries to make advances on Sorashi but she refuses him, making him angry. He attempts to evict her from her shelter. Sagar and his team wait for Sorashi's order to fight against Jibananda. But Sorashi is totally dispassionate and decides to leave the temple as well as the village forever. This brings an unexpected change in Jibananda as he realises his mistakes and surrenders to Sorashi. In response to which she accepts his unconditional apology and accepts him.

== Cast ==
- Bhanu Bannerjee as Nirmal
- Durgadas Bannerjee as Jibananda
- Nibhanani Devi as Shoroshi
- Jahar Ganguly as Sagar Sardar
- Amar Mullick as Ekkari
- Shishubala as Haimabati
- Umasashi in a crowd scene

== See also ==
- Alam Ara
- Jamai Shashthi
