= Kapalkundala (TV series) =

Bengali Soap Opera

- Genre: Drama
- Created by: Raj Chakraborty
- Based on: Kapalkundala by Bankim Chandra Chatterjee
- Written by: Anjan Chakraborty; Souvik Bhattacharya
- Directed by: Amit Sengupta
- Starring: Soumi Chatterjee; Debojyoti Roychowdhury; Saunak Ray; Idhika Paul
- Theme music composer: Upaali Chattopadhyay
- Opening theme: "Kapalkundala"
- Country of origin: India
- Original language: Bengali
- No. of seasons: 1
- No. of episodes: 150

Production
- Producers: Raj Chakraborty; Shyam Agarwal
- Production location: Kolkata
- Running time: 22 minutes
- Production companies: Raj Chakraborty Production; Srijan Arts

Original release
- Network: Star Jalsha
- Release: 2 December 2019 – 28 August 2020

Related
- Phagun Bou

Kapalkundala is a Bengali television soap opera based on the novel of the same name written by Bankim Chandra Chatterjee. It premiered on 2 December 2019 on Bengali GEC Star Jalsha, 9:30 pm every day. It is produced by Raj Chakraborty and stars Soumi Chatterjee, Debojyoti Roychowdhury, Saunak Ray and Idhika Paul.

== Cast ==
- Soume Chatterjee as Kapalkundala Sharma
- Sounak Rayy as Nabakumar Sharma
- Idhika Paul as Padmabati
- Debojyoti Roy Chowdhury as Kaapalik
- Chaitali Chakraborty as Kanak, Nabakumar's aunt.
- Sayak Chakraborty as Ganesh (Nabakumar's brother)
- Shreya Chatterjee as Pushpa
- Mousumi Saha
