= Bhikharan =

- Directed by: Premankur Atorthy
- Written by: Premankur Atorthy
- Produced by: Kolhapur Cinetone
- Starring: Rattan Bai; Master Vinayak; Hafisji; Pramila
- Cinematography: V. B. Joshi
- Music by: H. C. Bali
- Production company: Kolhapur Cinetone
- Release date: 1935
- Running time: 143 min
- Country: India
- Language: Hindi

Bhikharan (Beggar-Maid) also called Song of Life, is a 1935 Hindi melodrama film directed by Premankur Atorthy. The film was produced by Kolhapur Cinetone and starred Rattan Bai, Master Vinayak, Hafisji, Pramila, and Gundopant Walawalkar. The camera work was by V. B. Joshi. The music for the film was composed by H. C. Bali.

== Plot ==
Madhavi (Rattan Bai) is married to Kedar (Hafisji). The rich Chandra (Pramila) enters their life and since Kedar wants to marry her, he asks Madhavi to leave. Chandra is in love with the artist Kumar (Master Vinayak), but is forced into marriage with Kedar. Madhavi takes to begging on the streets by singing. She meets Kumar and models as his muse. Kumar and Madhavi fall in love but Chandra enters their life and Madhavi has to leave again. This time she becomes a famous singing star. After several dramatic situations Kumar and Madhavi reunite and get married.

== Cast ==
- Rattan Bai as Madhavi
- Master Vinayak as Kumar
- Hafisji as Kumar
- Pramila as Chandra
- Gundopant Walawalkar
- Firoze Bai
- Pawar
- Raja Pundit

== Songs ==
Song List

- "Wo Lage Hain Aaj Is Tadbir Men"
- "Tadapte Laute Hai Naala-O-Fariyaad Karte Hai"
- "Chal Sajan Aise"
- "Deepak Ka Ujla Prakash"
- "Nishan Gham Ke Rajjo Hue Kyun Ayaan"
- "Josh-e-Junoon Ne Kr Diye Noor-o-Nazar Alag Alag"
- "Prem Kiya Tha Is Vichar Se"
- "Sagri Rain Mohe Baat Dikhayi"
- "Tilchatta Haye Tilchatta Chipkali Ne Pakad Liya"
- "Zamana Ek who Bhi Tha"
- "Chhaya Hai Charon Aur Andhera"
