= Ňárad =

Ňárad Csiliznyárad
- Municipality
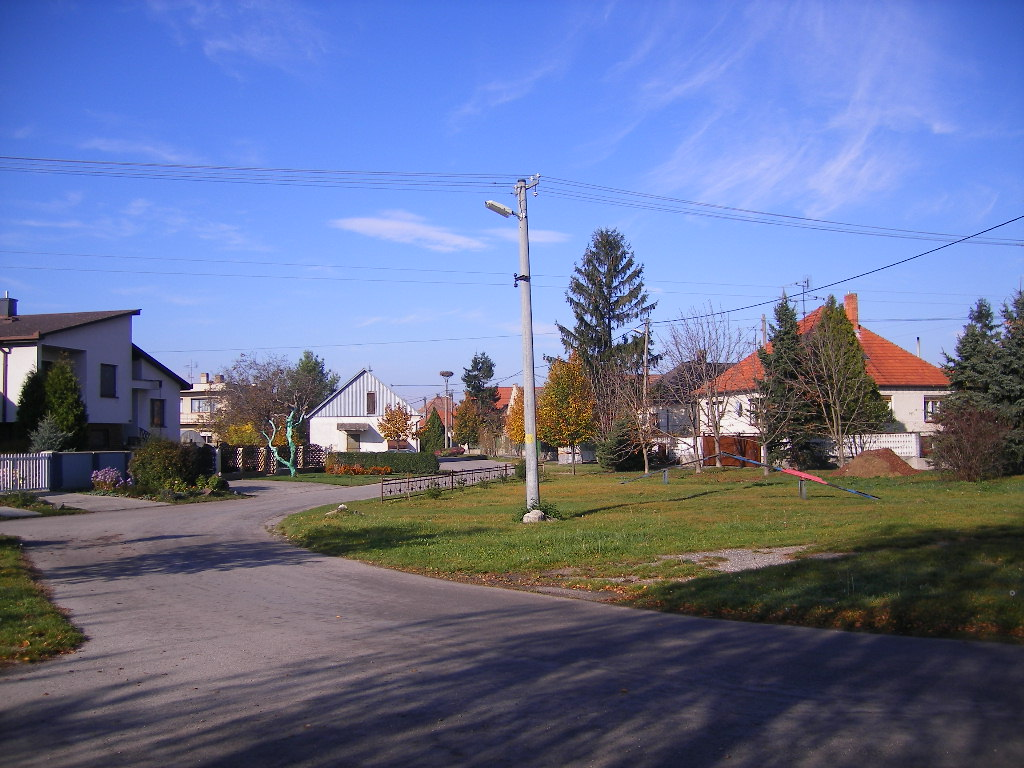

- Flag Coat of arms

- Location of Ňárad in the Trnava Region Location of Ňárad in Slovakia
- Coordinates: 47.84°N 17.61°E
- Country: Slovakia
- Region: Trnava Region
- District: Dunajská Streda District
- First mentioned: 1468

Government
  - Mayor: Jozef Lukács (SMK-MKP)

Area
  - Total: 10.44 km^{2} (4.03 sq mi)
- Elevation: 113 m (371 ft)

Population (2025)
  - Total: 658

Ethnicity
  - Hungarians: 95,13 %
  - Slovaks: 4,55 %
- Time zone: UTC+1 (CET)
  - Summer (DST): UTC+2 (CEST)
- Postal code: 930 08
- Area code: +421 31
- Vehicle registration plate (until 2022): DS
- Website: obecnarad.sk

Ňárad (Hungarian: Csiliznyárad, pronounced [ˈtʃilizɲaːrɒd]) is a village and municipality in the Dunajská Streda District in the Trnava Region of south-west Slovakia.

== History ==
The village was first recorded in 1468 as the estate of the Dóczy family. Until the end of World War I, it was part of Hungary and fell within the Tószigetcsilizköz district of Győr County. After the Austro-Hungarian army disintegrated in November 1918, Czechoslovak troops occupied the area. After the Treaty of Trianon of 1920, the village became officially part of Czechoslovakia. In November 1938, the First Vienna Award granted the area to Hungary and it was held by Hungary until 1945. After Soviet occupation in 1945, Czechoslovak administration returned and the village became officially part of Czechoslovakia in 1947.

The former Slovak names of the village were Topoľovec and Čiližský Ňárad.

== Population ==
Population statistic (10 years)
Year	1995	2005	2015	2025
Count	594	623	624	658
Difference		+4.88%	+0.16%	+5.44%

Population statistic
Year	2024	2025
Count	645	658
Difference		+2.01%

It has a population of 658 people (31 December 2025).

In 1910, the village had 659, for the most part, Hungarian inhabitants.

=== Ethnicity ===
Census 2021 (1+ %)
Ethnicity	Number	Fraction
Hungarian	579	91.75%
Slovak	50	7.92%
Not found out	35	5.54%
Total	631	

In year 2021 was 631 people by ethnicity 579 as Hungarian, 50 as Slovak, 35 as Not found out, 4 as Czech, 3 as Other, 1 as Italian and 1 as Romani.

Note on population: The difference values of population numbers in the table "Population statistic" and in the sections "Ethnicity" & "Religion" is caused by the use of various statistical methods.

=== Religion ===
Census 2021 (1+ %)
Religion	Number	Fraction
Roman Catholic Church	438	69.41%
None	106	16.8%
Calvinist Church	61	9.67%
Not found out	8	1.27%
Greek Catholic Church	8	1.27%
Total	631	

In year 2021 was 631 people by religion 438 from Roman Catholic Church, 106 from None, 61 from Calvinist Church, 8 from Not found out, 8 from Greek Catholic Church, 6 from Christian Congregations in Slovakia, 2 from Evangelical Church, 1 from Other and not ascertained christian church and 1 from Ad hoc movements.

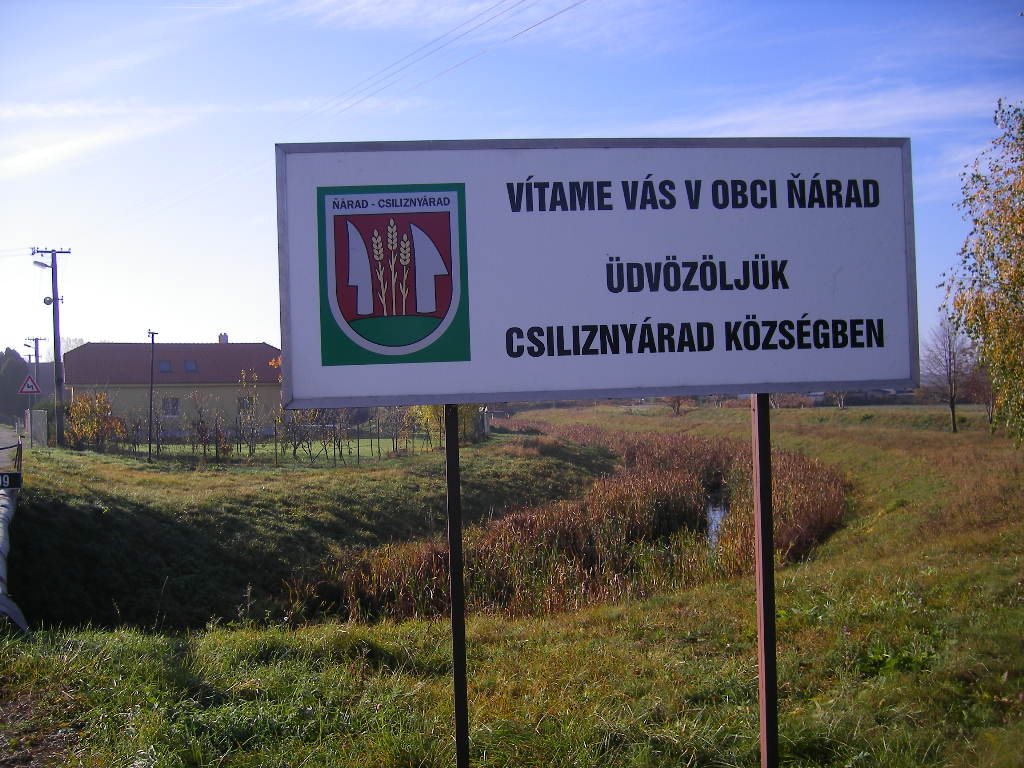

== Geography ==
The municipality lies at an altitude of 113 metres (371 ft) and covers an area of 10.44 km^{2} (4.03 sq mi) (2025).
