= Andhare Alo (1922 film) =

1922 film

- Directed by: Sisir Bhaduri; Naresh Mitra
- Produced by: Taj Mahal Film Co., Calcutta
- Starring: Sisir Kumar Bhaduri; Naresh Mitra; Jogesh Choudhury; Durga Rani
- Cinematography: Noni Gopal Sanyal
- Production companies: Taj Mahal Film Co., Calcutta
- Release date: 1922
- Country: India
- Language: Bengali silent film

Andhare Alo (Beam of Light) also called The Influence of Love was a 1922 silent film from the Bengali Film industry and a debut production from the Taj Mahal Films, Calcutta. Based on a short story of the same name "Andhare Alo" (Beam of Light) by Saratchandra Chatterjee, it was directed by Sisir Bhaduri and Naresh Mitra. The cinematographer was Noni Gopal Sanyal. The cast included Sisir Kumar Bhaduri, Naresh Mitra, Jogesh Choudhury and Durga Rani. The film was appreciated by the critics for its melodramatic content and was claimed to be a "huge hit" at the box-office.

The story focuses on a love triangle, where the man Satyendra, marries due to family obligations and then leaves his eleven-year-old young bride called Radharani behind, and gets involved with a more mature and modern courtesan. The film is cited as one of the earliest to feature a dancing girl as one end of a triangle in Indian cinema.

== Cast ==
- Sisir Kumar Bhaduri as Satyendra
- Naresh Mitra as Amar
- Jogesh Choudhury as Deonji
- Durga Rani as Bijli
- Lila Debi
- Kankabati
