= Haar Jeet (1940 film) =

- Directed by: Amar Mullick
- Release date: 1940
- Country: India
- Language: Hindi

Haar Jeet is a 1940 Bollywood film directed by Amar Mullick. It stars Kanan Devi.

== Cast ==
- Kanan Devi as Kamala
- Pahadi Sanyal as Maheshbabu Narendra
- Meera Dutta as Chhaya Devi
- Nawab
- Nemo
- Pannalal Shrivastava
- Madho Shukla
- Arvind
