= Punarjanma (1932 film) =

1932 film

- Directed by: Premankur Atorthy
- Produced by: B. N. Sircar
- Starring: Durgadas Bannerjee; Tulsi Chakraborty; Amar Mullick; Devbala
- Cinematography: Nitin Bose
- Music by: R. C. Boral
- Production company: New Theatres
- Release date: 2 April 1932
- Running time: 159 min
- Country: India
- Language: Bengali

Punarjanma (English: reborn) is a 1932 Indian Bengali film directed by Premankur Atorthy. The film was produced by New Theatres Ltd Calcutta, with music composed by R. C. Boral. The director of photography was Nitin Bose. The film starred Durgadas Bannerjee, Tulsi Chakraborty, Amar Mullick, Devbala, Krishna Halder, and Premankur Atorthey. The film saw the debut in films of one of Bengali cinema's most talented comic actors, Tulsi Chakraborty.

== Cast ==
- Durgadas Bannerjee
- Tulsi Chakraborty
- Amar Mullick
- Devbala
- Krishna Halder
- Premankur Atorthey
