= Tulsi Lahiri =

Tulsi Lahri
- Born: 7 April 1897; Rangpur, British India
- Died: 22 June 1959 (aged 62); Calcutta, India
- Occupations: Actor; Director, Playwright
- Years active: 1920–1959

Tulsi Lahiri (7 April 1897 – 22 June 1959) was a Bengali actor, director and play writer.

== Early life ==
Lahiri was born in 1897 in a zamindar family of Naldanga village, Rangpur of British India. He passed B.A and B.L and started his lawyer career in Rangpur court. While he came to Alipore Kolkata, Ustad Jamiruddin Khan recorded two of his songs and inspired Lahiri joined His Master's Voice as music director.

== Career ==
Lahiri acted on stage and in number of films as actor, vocalist and instrumentalist. He performed initially in silent films then worked in more than 50 movies. He became popular after releasing his play Duhkhir Iman and Chhenra Taar which were successfully run in Bengal. He made an orchestra which was often used in stage dances. In 1933 he directed two films namely Jamuna Puliney and Radha Krishna.

== Plays ==
- Mahasampad
- Chorabali
- Dukhir Iman
- Vitti
- Chenra Taar
- Natyakar
- Nayak
- Churayyananda
- Banglar Mati
- Thikadar

== Partial filmography ==
- Mriter Martye Agaman
- Sagar Sangamey
- Manmoyee Girls' School
- Parash Pathar
- Baksiddha
- Saheb Bibi Golam
- Sagar Sangamey
- Parabhritika
- Pathik
- Digbhranta
- Bamuner Meye
- Ramprasad
- Tumi Aar Aami
- Jiban Sangini
- Abatar
- Rikta
- Bangalee
- Radha Krishna
- Sonar Sansar
- Matri Sneha
