= Bharat Ki Beti =

1935 film by Premankur Atorthy

- Directed by: Premankur Atorthy
- Produced by: Eastern Arts
- Starring: Rattan Bai; Gul Hamid; Amirbai Karnataki; Hari Shivdasani
- Music by: Ustad Jhande Khan; Anil Biswas
- Production company: Eastern Arts
- Release date: 1935
- Country: India
- Language: Hindi

Bharat Ki Beti (India's Daughter) is a 1935 Hindi social film directed by Premankur Atorthy. The cast included Rattan Bai, Gul Hamid, Yasmin, Amirbai Karnataki, Gope, Dadabhai Sarkari and Hari Shivdasani. The music direction was credited to Jhande Khan and Anil Biswas. This was actor Hari Shivdasani's second film, having begun his career with Dharma Ki Devi (1935) the same year. Produced by Eastern Arts, Bharat Ki Beti focused on the nationalistic viewpoint while India was still under British rule.

== Cast ==
- Rattan Bai
- Hamid
- Miss Kamla
- Yasmin
- Amirbai Karnataki
- Gope
- Miss Saronini
- Dadabhai Sarkari
- Shivdasani

== Soundtrack ==
The music of the film was composed by Ustad Jhande Khan.

The devotional song, "Tere Poojan Ko Bhagwaan Bana Man Mandir Alishan" sung by Rattan Bai in this film is still regarded as a classic bhajan.

=== Track listing ===
- "Ishwar Ne Jab Prem Banaya"
- "Shyam Sundar Ki Bansri Jag Mein Sukh Ka Geet Sunaati Hai"
- "Sansaar Ke Sundar Roop Ka Lobhi"
- "Aye Bhanwra Sanan Manan Sankari Maare"
- "Hamari Kahi Maano Ae Babu Ji"
- "Naina Neer Bhar Aaye Saanwre"
- "Deen Dayal Daya Karke Anil Biswas"
- "Dhoondat Kahan Jangal Jangal Jangal Man Mein Baawri"
- "Prabhu Mori Naiyya Paar Karo"
- "Pyari Tori Rangat Badi Mazedaar"
- "Ghanshyam Bhaj Man Baarambaar"
