= Bhakta Prahlad (1946 film) =

1946 film

- Music by: Prasad
- Release date: 1946
- Country: India
- Language: Hindi

Bhakta Prahlad (transl. Prahlad, the devotee) is a 1946 Indian Hindi-language film.

== Music ==
The film's music was composed by Hanuman Prasad and K. C. Verma.

1. "Suno Suno Hari Ki Leela" – Geeta Dutt
2. "Ab Jani Re Pahchani Re" – Geeta Dutt
3. "Kyu Door Hua Mujhse" – Shamshad Begum
4. "Narayan Hari" – N/A
5. "Mai To Nachungi" – N/A
6. "Anand Manaye Gaye" – N/A
7. "Bahar Ke Din Sajna" – N/A
8. "Jag Uthe Hum Jag Uthe" – Geeta Dutt
9. "More Raja Ka Kunj" – N/A
10. "Suno Suno Binti Hamari" – Geeta Dutt
11. "Tumhi Sansar Rachate Ho" – Shaukat Ali
