= Kapalkundala (1933 film) =

1933 film

- Directed by: Premankur Atorthy
- Produced by: New Theatres
- Starring: Umasashi; Durgadas Bannerjee; Molina Devi
- Music by: R. C. Boral
- Production company: New Theatres
- Release date: 1933
- Running time: 122 minutes
- Country: India
- Language: Bengali

Kapalkundala is a 1933 Bengali social family film directed by Premankur Atorthy for New Theatres Ltd. Calcutta. The film starred Umasashi, Durgadas Bannerjee, Manoranjan Bhattacharya and Molina Devi. It is based on Kapalkundala, a famous Bengali novel written by Bankimchandra Chattopadhyay in 1866. This was the second remake of Kapalakundala, the first being made in 1929 by Priyanath Ganguly. The film was made three more times: 1939, 1952, 1981. The film did well celebrating a run of twenty-five weeks.

== Plot ==
The film is about a girl named Kapalkundala (Uma Sashi), who is brought up in a forest by the sage Kapalik (Manoranjan Bhattacharya). She meets a young man, Nabakumar (Durgadas Bannerjee), who loses his way in the forest, and she falls in love with him. They elope and marry. She relocates to the city with her husband but finds herself unable to adapt to city life. Kapalik with the help of Shyama (Molina Devi) tries to malign her wanting her to return. The story ends with Kapalkundala killing herself by jumping in the river.

== Cast ==
- Umasashi as Kapalkundala
- Durgadas Bannerjee as Naba Kumar
- Manoranjan Bhattacharya as Kapalik
- Molina Devi as Shyama
- Amar Mullick
- Nibhanini Devi as Motibibi
- Amulya Mitra
