= Prahlad (film) =

1931 film

- Directed by: Priyanath Gangopadhyay
- Produced by: Madan Theatres Ltd
- Starring: Ahindra Choudhury; Kanan Debi
- Release date: 29 December 1931
- Country: India
- Language: Bengali

Prahlad is a 1931 Bengali film directed by Priyanath Gangopadhyay, and produced by Madan Theatre Limited. The film was released on 29 December 1931 in Calcutta.

== Cast ==
- Ahindra Choudhury
- Niharbala as dancer
- Kanan Devi
- Joynarayan Mukhopadhyay
- Mrinalkanti Ghosh
