= Durgadas Bannerjee =

Indian actor (1893–1943)

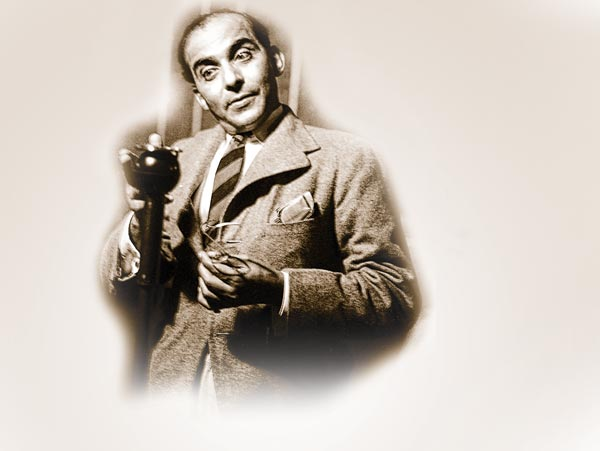
- Born: 3 December 1893; Kalikapur, Bengal Presidency, British India
- Died: 3 June 1943 (aged 49); Calcutta, Bengal Presidency, British India
- Occupations: Actor, singer
- Spouse: Bina Pani Bandyopadhyay
- Parents: Taraknath Bandyopadhyay (father); Annopurna Bandyopadhyay (mother)

Durgadas Bannerjee (1893–1943) was an Indian Bengali film actor who appeared in many roles from 1922 to 1943.

== Early life ==
Bannerjee was born on 3 December 1893 to a zamindar family at Kalikapur, Kolkata. Garia Rajbari was his ancestral home.

Bannerjee received his early education from South Garia School in South Garia. He then studied art at the Bou Bazar Art School. Bannerjee later received his degree in art from Government College of Art and Craft in Kolkata.

== Career ==
Bannerjee started working as a Word Writer and Title Writer in silent movies for Madan Theatre and the Taj Mahal Film Company.

In 1922, Bannerjee start acting for Taj Mahal, performing small roles under Sisir Bhaduri in films like Andhare Alo. Bannerjee's first leading role was in Maan Bhanjan (1923).

In 1923, Bannerjee briefly acted in plays at the Star Theatre in Kolkata under Aporesh Chandra Mukherjee. One of his prominent roles was as Bikarna in Karanarjun (1923). That same year, Bannerjee acted in Naresh Mitra's film Chandranath.

Bannerjee appeared in over 19 silent movies as a lead actor. In 1931, Bannerjee appeared in the first Bengali language sound film, Dena Paona (1931), which was a major hit.

Priya Bandhobi (1943) was Bannerjee's last film.

== Personal life ==
Bannerjee married Bina pani Banerjee, an educationalist. He was a grand uncle of musician Sudipto “Buti” Banerjee of Bengali rock band, Cactus. He died in 1943.

== Selected filmography ==
1. Andhare alo; 1922
2. Bishabriksha; 1922
3. Maanbhanjan; 1923
4. Chandranath; 1924
5. Mishar Rani; 1924
6. Jaler Meye; 1925
7. Premanjali; 1926:
8. Dharmapatni; 1926
9. Krishnakanter Will; 1926
10. Durgesh Nandini; 1927
11. Bishabriksha; 1928
12. Sarala; 1928
13. Sasthi Ki Shanti; 1928
14. Kapal Kundala; 1929
15. Rajani; 1929
16. Indira; 1929
17. Radha Rani; 1930
18. Buker Bojha; 1930
19. Kanthahaar; 1930
20. Dena Paona; 1931
21. Bhagya Lakshmi; 1932
22. Punarjanma; 1932
23. Chirakumar Sabha; 1932
24. Chandidas; 1932:
25. Kapalkundala (1933 film); 1933
26. Meerabai; 1933
27. Rajrani Meera BNG 1933
28. Mahua; 1934
29. Bhagya Chakra; 1935
30. Karodpati; 1935
31. Paraparey; 1936
32. Didi; 1937
33. Bidyapati; 1937
34. Desher Mati; 1938
35. Parasmani; 1939:
36. Thikadar; 1940:
37. Avatar; 1941:
38. Priya Bandhabi. 1943:
