= Jamai Sasthi (film) =

1931 film

Jamai Shashthi
- Directed by: Amar Choudhury
- Written by: Amar Choudhury
- Produced by: Madan Theatres Ltd
- Starring: Amar Chowdhury; Jatin Singha; Ms. Golela; Bimal Gupta; Kartik Ray; Bholanath
- Cinematography: T. Marconi
- Music by: Kshirodegopal Mukherjee
- Release date: 11 April 1931
- Country: India
- Language: Bengali

Jamai Shashthi (Bengali: জামাই ষষ্ঠী English: Son-in-law Day) is a 1931 Bengali short film directed by Amar Choudhury and produced by Madan Theatre Limited. The film is considered a milestone in Bengali cinema, as it was the first Bengali short film to be produced as a talkie. It was released at Crown Cinema Hall in Calcutta on 11 April 1931, the same year as Alam Ara, the first Indian talkie.

== Cast ==
- Professor Bholanath
- Amar Choudhury as Kuber
- Miss Golela
- Khirodegopal Mukherjee
- Ranisundari as Mother in law
