= Sisir Bhaduri =

Indian actor (1889–1959)

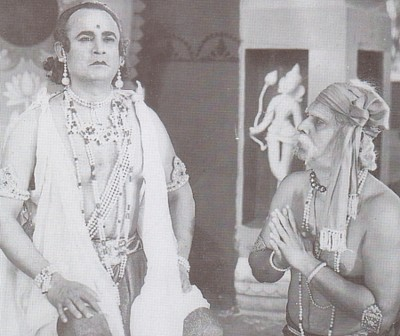
- A scene from Seeta, 1933
- Born: Sisir Kumar Bhaduri; 2 October 1889; Midnapore, Bengal Presidency, British India
- Died: 30 June 1959 (aged 69); Baranagar, West Bengal, India
- Occupations: Theater and stage actor

Shishir Kumar Bhaduri or Sisir Kumar Bhaduri (2 October 1889 – 30 June 1959) was an Indian stage actor and theatre founder, commonly referred to as the pioneer of modern Bengali theatre. He was an actor, director, playwright and scenic designer. After Girish Chandra Ghosh, he introduced realism and naturalism in Indian theatre.

== Life ==
Born in Midnapore, West Bengal, he studied at Scottish Church College Kolkata, where he began participating in theatre. He was also a professor of Metropolitan College (today's Vidyasagar College). In 1921, he left his job to become a full-time stage actor.

He was awarded the Padma Bhushan, India's third highest civilian honour by the Government of India in 1959. He refused the award, saying that if he accepted it would send a wrong signal that the Government has helped to promote theatre culture in the country.

The 2013 play Nihsanga Samrat, directed by Debesh Chattopadhyay, is based on the 2005 Bengali novel of the same name, written by Sunil Gangopadhyay, on the life of Bhaduri.

== Filmography ==
=== Director ===
- Chanakya (1939)
- Talkie of Talkies (1937)... a.k.a. Dasturmoto Talkie
- Seeta (1933)
- Palli Samaj (1932)
- Bicharak (1929)... a.k.a. The Judge
- Andhare Alo (1922)... a.k.a. The Influence of Love
- Barer Bazar (1922)... a.k.a. Marriage Market (India: English title)
- Kamale Kamini (1922)... a.k.a. Maid of the Lotus
- Mohini (1921)... a.k.a. Ekadashi... a.k.a. Triumph of Fate

=== Actor ===
- Chanakya (1939) .... Chanakya
- Talkie of Talkies (1937) (as Sisir Bhaduri) .... Prof. Digambar Majumdar... a.k.a. Dasturmoto Talkie
- Seeta (1933) .... Ram
- Palli Samaj (1932) .... Ramesh
- Bicharak (1929)... a.k.a. The Judge
- Andhare Alo (1922) .... Satyendra... a.k.a. The Influence of Love
- Kamale Kamini (1922)... a.k.a. Maid of the Lotus
- Mohini (1921)... a.k.a. Ekadashi... a.k.a. Triumph of Fate

== Legacy ==
- Sisir Mancha is adjacent to Rabindra Sadan-Nandan Complex. The theatre auditorium is named after Bengali dramatist Sisir Kumar Bhaduri and it was established in 1978.

== Bibliography ==
- The Lonely Monarch, by Sunil Gangopadhyay. tr. by Swapna Dutta, Hachette UK, 2013. ISBN 978-93-5009-628-4.

"Our Nataraj: Sisir Bhaduri Theatre to Talkies". By Soumitra Chattopadhyay. Comp., ed. and tr. by Mou Chakraborty. Sister Nivedita University Press, 2026. ISBN 978-81-997456-9-8.
