= Premankur Atorthy =

Indian actor (1890–1964)

- প্রেমাঙ্কুর আতর্থী
- Born: 1 January 1890; Faridpur, British India
- Died: 13 October 1964 (aged 74); Calcutta, India
- Occupations: Novelist, journalist, film director

Premankur Atorthy (1890–1964) was an Indian novelist, journalist, and film director. He was involved in Hindi and Bengali cinema.

== Early life ==
Atorthy's was born in Faridpur and his initial schooling started at Brahmo School, Kolkata. He then studied variously at Duff School, Keshab Academy, City School and Brahma Boys Boarding and Day School, which were then under the University of Calcutta. His father, Mahesh Chandra Atorthy, was a propagator and writer of the Brahma Samaj.

Atorthy was imaginative and fond of adventure from boyhood. Failing to do well in his school, he ran away from home. At Bombay, he learnt to play the sitar under Ustad Karamatullah. Returning to Kolkata, he started working at a sports goods shop in Chowringee. Subsequently, he worked for the Baikali, Yadughar, Hindustan, Bharatvarsha, Sangkalpa, Nachghar and Bharati.

== Works ==
He was a noted novelist and playwright, author of many books including compilations of short stories, essays (e.g. on silent film, cf. Atorthy, 1990) and plays. His best- known literary work was Mahasthavir Jatak (1944), a fictional autobiography in four volumes noted for its irreverent portrayal of Calcutta's early 20th-century élites. Among his other novels are Anarkali (1925), Bajikar (1922), Achalpather Jatri (1923), Chasir Meye (1924), Dui Ratri (1927) and Takht Taus. Associated with literary journal Bharati, he edited Nachghar, one of the first performing arts journals to take film seriously, with Hemendra Kumar Roy and film- maker Pashupati Chatterjee.

He founded Betar Jagat, the journal of the AIR, Calcutta (1929). He started as scenarist and actor, using the pseudonym Krishna Haldar, at Indian Kinema Arts (Punarjanma, 1927; Chasher Meye, 1931). He remade Punarjanma in 1932. He joined B. N. Sircar's International Filmcraft as writer and assistant to Prafulla Roy (Chasher Meye is based on Atorthy's novel and script). He also scripted Nitin Bose's Buker Bojha (1930).

Premankur entered the cinema world with a role in the Bangla film Punarjanma. His first directed film, Dena Paona, was New Theatres' first talkie, made in direct competition with Madan Theatres' Jamai Sasthi (1931). He made several Hindi films as part of New Theatres' effort to enter the North Indian market, including the classic film of Agha Hashar Kashmiri's play Misar Kumari to Yahudi Ki Ladki (1933). His film versions of literary classics, e.g. from Saratchandra Chattopadhyay (Dena Paona), Rabindranath Tagore (Chirakumar Sabha) and Bankimchandra Chattopadhyay (Kapal Kundala), established the élite literary film genre intended to distinguish New Theatres' films from routine stage adaptations and remained important signifiers of high art in Bengali cinema. First Bengali film-maker to work in Western India, e.g. for Kolhapur Cinetone (1935) and for Imperial (1936). Credited with the supervision of H. K. Shivdasani's Yasmin (1935), made by the Krishna Studio.

== Filmography ==
=== Director ===
Year	Film	Director	Role
1927	Punarjanma	Jayagopal Pillai	Actor
1931	Chasher Meye	Prafulla Roy	Actor
1931	Dena Paona	Premankur Atorthy	Director
1932	Chirakumar Sabha	Premankur Atorthy	Director
1932	Subah Ka Sitara	Premankur Atorthy	Director
1932	Punarjanma	Premankur Atorthy	Actor, director
1932	Zinda Lash	Premankur Atorthy	Director
1932	Mohabbat Ke Ansu	Premankur Atorthy	Director
1933	Kapalkundala	Premankur Atorthy	Director
1933	Yahudi Ki Ladki	Premankur Atorthy	Director
1935	Bharat Ki Beti	Premankur Atorthy	Director
1935	Karwan-E-Hayat	Premankur Atorthy	Director
1935	Bhikharan	Premankur Atorthy	Director
1936	Sarala	Premankur Atorthy	Director
1936	Hind Mahila	Premankur Atorthy	Director
1937	Dhanwan	Premankur Atorthy	Director
1938	Dulhan	Premankur Atorthy	Director
1940	Kalyani	Premankur Atorthy	Director
1941	Abatar	Premankur Atorthy	Director
1943	Dikshul	Premankur Atorthy	Director
1950	Sudhar Prem	Premankur Atorthy	Director.

=== Writer ===
- Sarala (1936)
- Bhikharan (1935)... aka Song of Life (India: English title)

=== Actor ===
- Chasher Meye (1931) ... aka Farmer's Daughter (India: English title)
