= Amar Choudhury =

Indian film actor, director, editor (1897–1948)

- অমর চৌধুরী
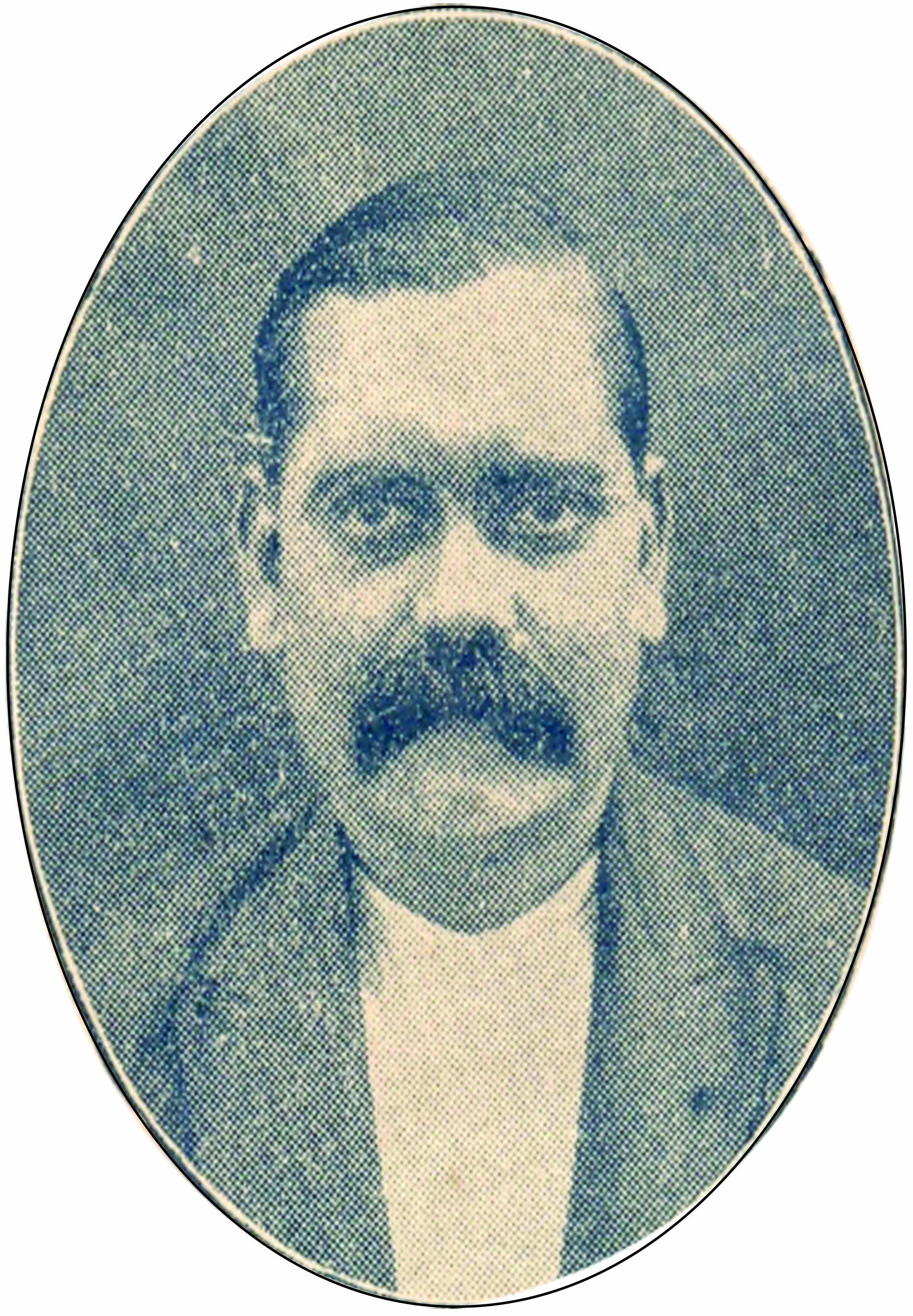
- Born: 1897
- Died: 30 August 1948 (aged 50–51)
- Occupations: film actor, director, editor and writer
- Years active: 1923-1948

Khalanka Bhanjan

Amar Choudhury (1897 – 30 August 1948) was an Indian film actor, director, editor and writer. He acted in all of the films that he wrote and directed. He wrote and directed Jamai Shashthi in 1931 produced by Madan Theatre Limited, credited as the first Bengali talkie. It was released on 11 April 1931 at Crown Cinema Hall in Calcutta in the same year as Alam Ara, the first Indian talkie was released.

== Filmography ==
Silent Feature Film Works of Late Sri Amar Chowdhury

Year	Name of picture	Producer/Distributor	Writer/Actor	Director
1923	Matrisneha	Madan Theaters	Amar Chowdhury	Jyotish Bandopadhyay
1924	Kamaley Kamini	,	Amar Chowdhury	Himself
1926	Dharmopatni	,	Amar Chowdhury	Himself
1930	Bharat Ramani	,	Amar Chowdhury	Himself
1931	Keranir Mashkabar	,	Amar Chowdhury	Himself
1932	Prohlad	Anupam Fine Arts	Amar Chowdhury	Himself

As per data accumulated from Bengali film magazine "Chitrobaani, 1956 edition".

Talkie Feature Film Works of Late Sri Amar Chowdhury

Date	Hall	Name of picture	Producer/Distributor	Writer/Director/Actor
11 April 1931	Crown	Jamaai Shashthi	Madan Theaters	Amar Chowdhury
6 December 1931	,	Tritiya Pakkho	,	Amar Chowdhury
1 July 1932	,	Chirokumari	,	Amar Chowdhury
March 1933	,	Kalonko Bhanjon	,	Amar Chowdhury
2 February 1935	Cornwallis	Shatyapathey	,	Amar Chowdhury
4 April 1936	Uttara	Pollibodhu	Kali Films	Amar Chowdhury
1937	....	Sarkari Jamaai	....	Amar Chowdhury

As per data accumulated from Bengali film magazine "Chitrobaani, 1956 edition".
