= Sonar Kellay Jawker Dhan =

2025 Bengali-language film by Sayantan Ghosal

- Theatrical release poster
- Directed by: Sayantan Ghosal
- Screenplay by: Sougata Basu
- Dialogues by: Sougata Basu
- Story by: Sougata Basu
- Produced by: Nispal Singh
- Starring: Parambrata Chatterjee; Koel Mallick; Gaurav Chakrabarty; Saheb Chatterjee; Suprobhat Das; Jammy Banerjee
- Cinematography: Ramyadip Saha
- Edited by: Subhajit Singha
- Music by: Rathijit Bhattacharjee
- Production company: Surinder Films
- Distributed by: Surinder Films
- Release date: 30 May 2025
- Running time: 134 minutes
- Country: India
- Language: Bengali
- Budget: ₹1.50 crore
- Box office: ₹1.63 crore

Sonar Kellay Jawker Dhan (Bengali pronunciation: [ʃoʊˈneɪrˈkɛlleɪˈdʒɔːkərðeɪn]; transl. The Treasure of Ghost in the Golden Fort), (Note: Commonly abbreviated as Jawker Dhan 3) also known by the initialism SKJD, is a 2025 Indian Bengali-language action-adventure film directed by Sayantan Ghosal. It stars Parambrata Chatterjee, Koel Mallick and Gaurav Chakrabarty reprising their roles from the previous films, with Saheb Chatterjee, Suprobhat Das, Jammy Banerjee and Masood Akhtar play another pivotal roles.

Partially adapted from Hemendra Kumar Roy's Bimal-Kumar series and Satyajit Ray's 1971 novel Sonar Kella from the Feluda series, the film follows Bimal, Ruby and Kumar uncovering clues in Jaisalmer Fort to protect a mythical stone owned by Mukul, a man with a return of past life memories. Announced in October 2023, it marks Ghosal's third collaboration with Parambrata and second collaboration with Koel. Principal photography commenced in January 2024 and wrapped by in March 2024. Major filming took places in Kolkata, Jaisalmer, Jaipur and Jodhpur in subsequent schedules. Written by Sougata Basu, music of the film is composed by Rathijit Bhattacharjee. Ramyadip Saha handled its cinematography and Subhajit Singha did the editing.

Sonar Kellay Jawker Dhan released theatrically on 30 May 2025, coinciding with Jamai Sasthi. It received acclaim from critics who praised its cast performances, direction, action sequences, musical score, story and cinematography.

== Plot ==
Haunted once again by visions of a lost treasure, Mukul Dhar finds himself in mortal danger. Bimal, Kumar, and Dr. Rubi Chatterjee must uncover ancient clues buried in Jaisalmer Fort's forgotten history - and protect Mukul from those who will stop at nothing to seize the Philosopher's Stone.

== Cast ==
- Parambrata Chatterjee as Bimal Sen
- Koel Mallick as Dr. Rubi Chatterjee
- Gaurav Chakrabarty as Kumar Ray
- Saheb Chatterjee as Sunil Bhargav
- Suprobhat Das as Mukul Dhar
- Jammy Banerjee as Birju
- Sankhadeep Banerjee as Jugnu
- Masood Akhtar as Kathputli Baba
- Judhajit Sarkar

== Production ==
=== Development ===
In early 2020, it was reported that the third film in the Jawker Dhan franchise was in development, with Parambrata Chatterjee, Koel Mallick and Gaurav Chakrabarty reprising their roles. In an interview with Millennium Post in November 2023, Sayantan Ghosal added, "The scale of the project is huge and we had a scope for a beginning and the interval, so it made sense for us to treat it as a psychological film rather than an adventure". As for the decision to make it multilingual, he says that it was because the film is based on a unique idea and has a universal theme. Later, it was revealed that the film would have some references from the 1974 film Sonar Kella, and also a homage to it on the occasion of its 50 years completion.

“Jawker Dhan is also about visuals - the fantastical, fantasy. It looks amazing with the kella, the city made of sandstone, the desert and camels. There’s a fantastical element about Jaisalmer. We were thinking about what story we could do in this location, and then we thought of including the Sonar Kella link [...] The story is a spin-off of Mukul. In Sonar Kella, we saw that his father was a gemstone cutter. So, we tried to create a story revolving around his past life. The contemporary Mukul runs a bookshop in College Street. Some of his past life memories are coming back now. He is around 50-52 years old.”

— Sayantan Ghosal on the felicitation to Sonar Kella at The Telegraph

Sougata Basu, the writer of the previous installments, was reported to be signed in August 2023, in his sixth collaboration with Ghosal after working on Alinagarer Golokdhadha (2018), Swastik Sanket (2022), Tenida and Co. (2023). Initially, Ritum Jain of Champion Movies was to co-produce the film like the previous ventures, while he opted out of the project in October 2023. The film's official title Sonar Kellay Jawker Dhan was announced on 17 November 2023.

=== Pre-production ===
Basu began writing the film's script in April 2022 and completed writing the first half within two months. Ghosal also assisted him in writing the story. He described the storyline as follows: "The dacoits of Chambal from the Aravalli Range of Rajasthan is a convoluted nexus that unfurls in the course of the narrative which led the audience to begin a thrilling adventure." Basu explored the subject of smuggling in the range when he read about such incidents in Jaisalmer years ago. They both personally went for location scouting across Guru Shikhar, as the film is set revolving the Jaisalmer Fort, and the plot is a homage to Sonar Kella.

Ghosal retained the crew members from his previous films, which included cinematographer Ramyadip Saha who worked with him on Satyanweshi Byomkesh (2021), Sagardwipey Jawker Dhan (2019) and Tenida and Co. (2023); editor Subhajit Singha who worked on Alinagarer Golokdhadha (2018), Satyanweshi Byomkesh, Nirbandhamer Jora Khun (2020), Swastik Sanket (2022), LSD: Laal Suitcase Ta Dekhechen? (2023) and Tenida and Co.; action choreographer Judo Ramu, VFX supervisor Tamal Roy and publicity designer Tony Kar under the banner of Ekta Creative Tales. Sandeep Sathi was the executive producer. Sunil Rodrigues also came on the board to design the action sequences, besides Ramu. Bickram Ghosh was reported to compose its music, while he left and Rathijit Bhattacharjee joined the team in December 2023.

A muhurat puja was held on 5 December 2023 at Surinder Film's office in Kolkata with the film's cast and crew. Prior to the commencement of the first schedule, the team constructed a set at the NT-1 Studio in Kolkata, where some action sequences were planned to be predominantly shot there. Test shoots for the film took place in late December 2023.

=== Casting ===
Kaushik Sen was to reprise his role as Hiranmoy Bose, while it was revealed in January 2024 that he wouldn't be seen in the film. Ghosal's initial choice was Kushal Chakraborty as Mukul Dhar, who also played the same role in the 1974 film, while he was later replaced by Suprobhat Das in that role. Saheb Chatterjee and Jammy Banerjee were also confirmed to be parts of the film. Masood Akhtar was revealed to play an important role in the film, marking his comeback to Bengali cinema 7 years after Kishore Kumar Junior (2018).

=== Filming ===
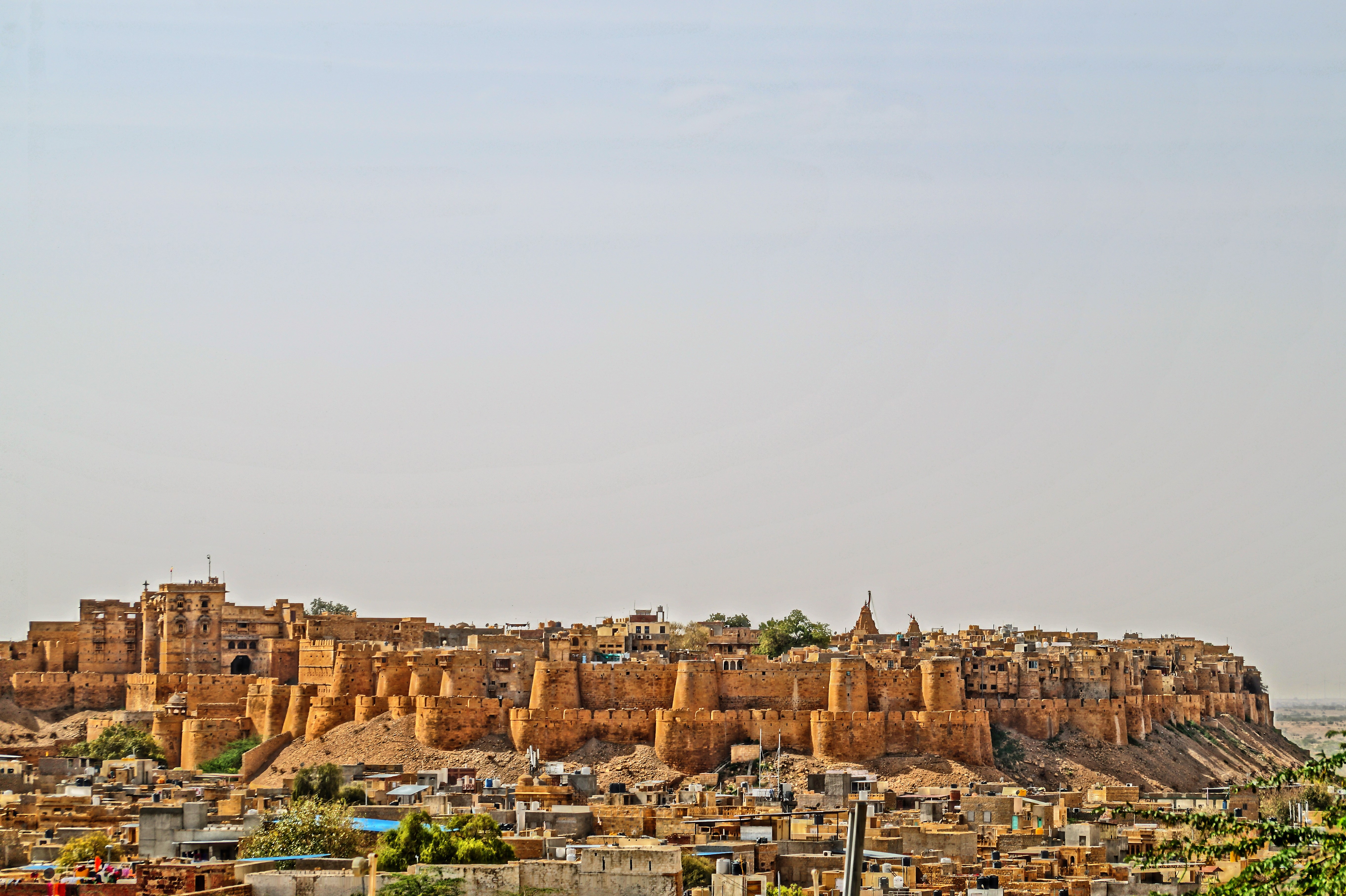
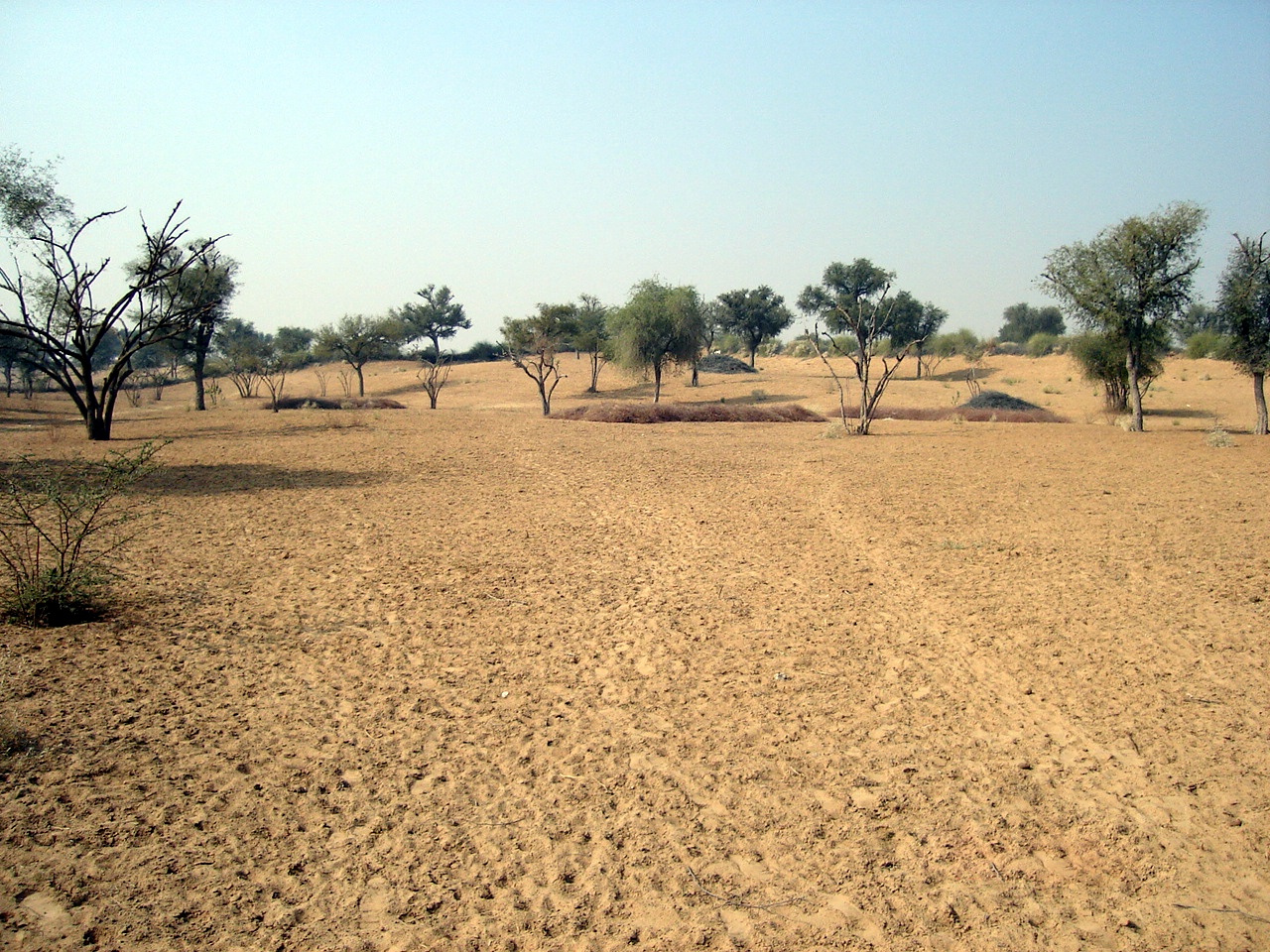
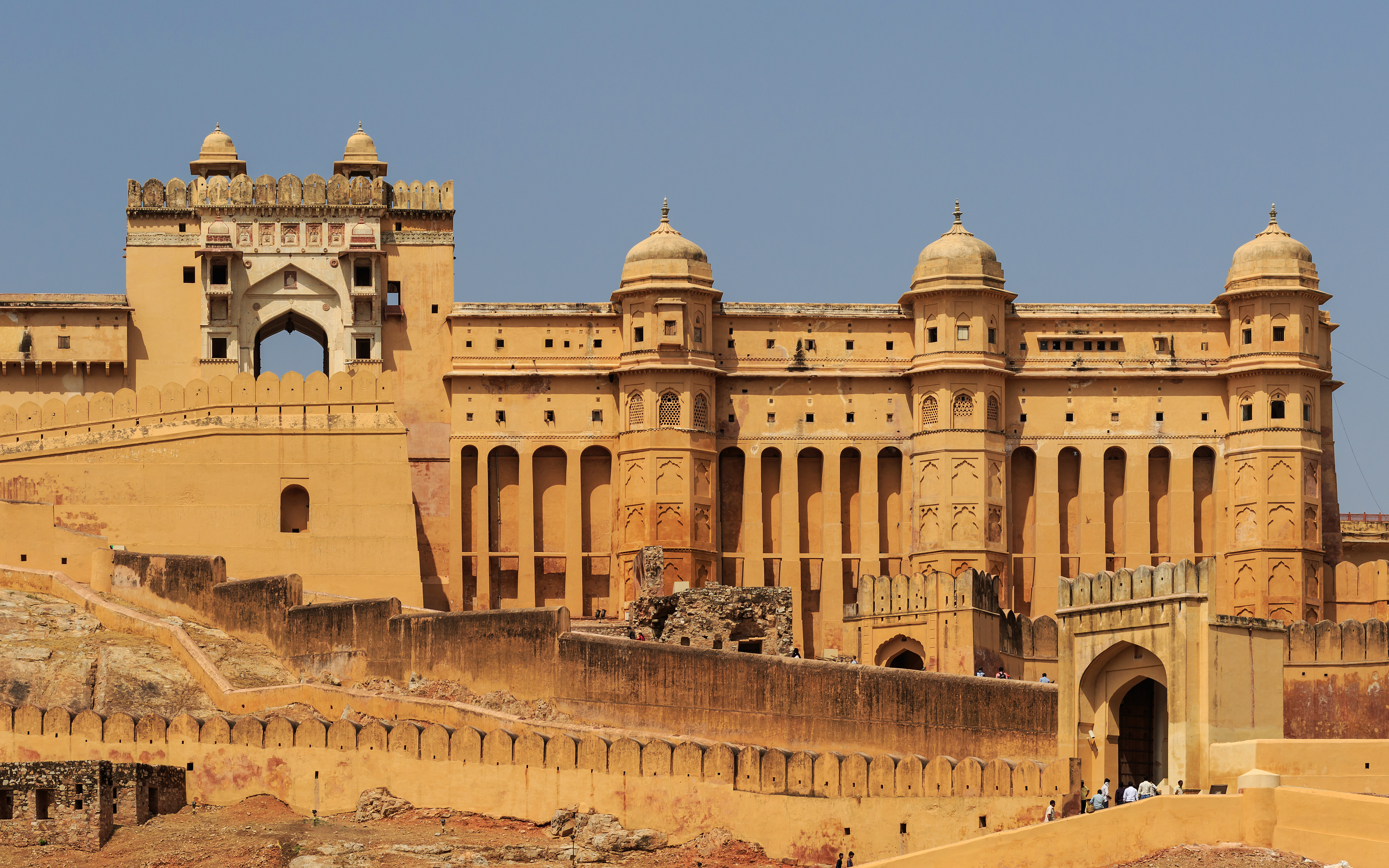
Jaisalmer Fort (top), Thar Desert (middle), Jaipur Fort (bottom) – major portions of the film were shot here.

The makers planned to shoot the first schedule of the film in Kolkata in late-December 2023, while it got delayed due to the pre-production issues and principal photography began with the first schedule on 21 January 2024 in Jaisalmer Fort, with a 14 working days. A chase sequence featuring Das was shot in the timespace between 22 and 23 January. Parambrata, Koel and Gaurav joined the production on 24 January and scenes featuring them and Das were shot. During this schedule, footage of a song was leaked and went viral, prompting the film's official technology security partner to warn people against sharing leaked content or they would be deleted. A high-octane action sequence was shot for five days in Thar Desert despite the temperature being 49 °C (120 °F), under the supervision of Judo Ramu. Parambrata and Gaurav took a training for an action sequence involving rope and stick-yielding, which was also filmed in this schedule. The schedule was completed on 5 February 2024, revealing the first look posters of the characters. The studio shared a behind-the-scenes video of the Rajasthan schedule that day as a tribute to the crew of SKJD, who worked behind-the-scenes in 45–51 °C (113–124 °F). The director thanked every person from the crew for making the schedule happen.

The second schedule of the shoot took place from 7 February 2024 in Jaipur, with a 8 days working schedule. This actually allowed the production team to take time and prepare the gadgets and props to be used in the film. Therefore, the production of the film was expected to take longer than usual. Two hand-to-hand combat sequences featuring Parambrata and Gaurav separately were filmed both under the supervision of Rodrigues in Kuldhara and Khuri respectively. Jammy Banerjee, who was reported to play a dacoit from the region, shared his experience about an intense stunt sequence with Koel, saying "It was scaring to me to hold a knife to the throat of my childhood crush as well as the superstar − Koel Mallick. I was a little bit uncomfortable to perform stunts with her, while she helped me a lot to be out of it".

The third schedule was intended to begin on 17 February at Kolkata, but commenced on 19 February. A set was constructed portraying the Lakshmi Puja in a specific scene. Parambrata, along with Koel, Gaurav, Suprobhat and Saheb joined the concurrent schedule, which was reported to go on for 17 days. In this schedule, Parambrata and Gaurav shot an action sequence for five days at Bidhannagar. In an interview to The Times of India, Parambrata added his intense stunts to be put on plainly but not ideal. Apart from it, another action sequence featuring Koel was shot with a Mocobot camera. Besides, a set resembling a temple made of red shrinks was constructed in this schedule at NT-1 Studio, which was later revealed to be the climax of the film. The makers spent ₹2.5 crores for shooting the scene. Principal photography wrapped by 5 March, with filming having lasted 65 working days. A month later, the team returned to Jaisalmer for patchwork filming.

== Marketing ==
Makers revealed the first look of the film with a motion poster on 28 April 2025, on the occasion of Koel Mallick's birthday. The teaser was finally dropped on 1 May 2025, a day before Satyajit Ray's birthday. The trailer of the film released on 16 May 2025.

The Bi-weekly magazine Anandalok highlighted an interview between Koel and Parambrata in their 27 May 2025 issue. A special programme was arranged by 91.9 Friends FM on 28 May 2025, on the occasion of the release of the film. On 29 May 2025, they played foosball at Siddha Sky Clubhouse as a part of the promotions.

== Release ==
=== Theatrical ===
Sonar Kellay Jawker Dhan released nationwide on 30 May 2024, coinciding with Summer vacation. It was premiered on over 250 screens, with over 320 shows across West Bengal. It had its nationwide release with 14 shows in major cities including Delhi, Mumbai, Hyderabad, Pune, Ahmedabad, having maximum shows across Bengaluru.

== Reception ==
=== Critical reception ===
Anandabazar Patrika gave the film 3.9 out of 5 stars and opined "From its first explosive frames, SKJD establishes itself as a film with grand ambitions. Far-fetched in writing but high on star power and style". Sandipta Bhanja of Sangbad Pratidin reviewed the film and wrote "At the beginning of the story, the makers pay tribute to Sonar Kella and Satyajit Ray. The action scenes could have been toned down a bit, at least out of respect for Satyajit." She praised the performances by its whole cast, especially that of Suprobhat Das and Koel Mallick.

Poorna Banerjee of The Times of India rated the film 3 out of 5 stars and wrote "Jaisalmer’s majestic fort becomes a character in itself, beautifully captured and enriched by Bengali folklore and bratakatha. A clever nod to the Bengali-speaking locals — a by product of Ray-inspired tourism, adds a meta layer of charm." She also praised its cast performances, cinematography, action sequences and editing. Shatakshi Ganguly of IWMBuzz termed it "massy, meaningful actioner" and opined "Sayantan Ghosal strikes the right chord, amalgamating the bygone memories we have of Sonar Kella with novelty." She also specified the inclusion of cultural references all over the film, also giving it a rating of 4/5 stars. According to Agnivo Niyogi of The Telegraph, the film can be considered to be a felicitiation to Indiana Jones and Amar Chitra Katha. He wrote "The film belongs to Suprobhat Das, whose portrayal of the grown-up Mukul is layered with melancholy and wonder. There’s a quiet pain in his eyes—a man unsure whether he’s remembering or imagining."

== Future ==
In the post-credit scene, it was hinted that the film would have a sequel. Owing to the film's success, Ghosal asserted the possibility of the sequel.
