= List of works by Hemendra Kumar Roy =

This is a list of Hemendra Kumar Roy's works.

== Novels ==
- Aleyar Alo (1919)
- Jaler Alpona (1920)
- Kalboishakhi (1921)
- Payer Dhulo (1922)
- Rasakali (1923)
- Jharer Jatri (1930)
- Padma-Kanta (1926)

Other novels include: Phulsajya, Parir Prem, Manikanchan, Pather Meye, Manimalinir Goli, Panchasharer Kirti etc.

== Juvenile literature ==
Title	Title in Bengali	Year of Publication	Notes
Mayakanan (The Magical Forest)	মায়াকানন	1923	
Bijaya	বিজয়া	1929	
Moynamotir Mayakanan (The Magical Forest of Moynamoti)	ময়নামতীর মায়াকানন	1930	Fantasy adventure novel.
Jaker Dhan (Yaksha's Treasures)	যকের ধন	1930	Adventure novel (Bimal-Kumar series).
Jader Naame Sabai Bhoy Paay (Names Feared by All)	যাদের নামে সবাই ভয় পায়	1932	Collection of Horror stories.
Meghduter Morte Agomon (When Martians Came to the Earth)	মেঘদূতের মর্ত্যে আগমন	1933	Science fiction adventure novel.
Abar Jaker Dhan (Yaksha's Treasures: A Sequel)	আবার যকের ধন	1933	Adventure novel (Bimal-Kumar series).
Ajob Deshe Amala (Amala in Wonderland)	আজব দেশে অমলা	1934	Translation of Lewis Carroll's Alice's Adventures in Wonderland.
King Kong	কিং কং	1934	Adaptation of the King Kong story.
Manusher Gondho Paaun (I Smell Man-flesh)	মানুষের গন্ধ পাঁউ	1934	Collection of Horror stories.
Sandhyar Pore Sabdhan (Beware After Nightfall)	সন্ধ্যার পরে সাবধান	1934	Collection of Horror stories.
Adrishyo Manush (The Invisible Man)	অদৃশ্য মানুষ	1935	Translation of H. G. Wells's The Invisible Man.
Himalayer Bhayankar (Horror of the Himalayas)	হিমালয়ের ভয়ঙ্কর	1935	
Rakta-Badal Jhare (Blood Rains)	রক্তবাদল ঝরে	1936	
Jayantar Kirti (Jayanta's Feat)	জয়ন্তর কীর্তি	1937	Detective story of Jayanta-Manik
Asambhaber Desh (The Land of Impossible)	অসম্ভবের দেশ	1937	
Padmarag Buddha (The Lotus-Coloured Buddha)	পদ্মরাগ বুদ্ধ	1938	
Amabasyar Raat (The New Moon Night)	অমাবস্যার রাত	1939	
Dragoner Duhswapno (The Dragon Nightmare)	ড্রাগনের দুঃস্বপ্ন	1939	
Morar Mrityu (Death of the Dead)	মড়ার মৃত্যু	1939	Horror novel.
Manush-Pishach (The Zombie)	মানুষ-পিশাচ	1939	Horror novel.
Manusher Prothom Adventure (The First Adventure of Man)	মানুষের প্রথম অ্যাডভেঞ্চার	1939	
Amrita Dwiper Sandhane (The Isle of Nectar )	অমৃত দ্বীপ	1940	
Chhaya-Kayar Mayakanon (Shadow, Light and Mystery)	ছায়াকায়ার মায়াপুরে	1940	Collection of five short stories. Contents: 1. "Dighir Mathe Bungalow" ("A Bungalow on the Lake's Field", horror story); 2. "Pishach" ("The Vampire", detective story); 3. "Bhimdakater Bot" ("The Banyan Tree of Bhime the Bandit", horror story); 4. "Daliar Opomrityu" ("Unnatural Death of a Flower", detective story); 5. "Agaadh Joler Rui-Katla" ("The Deep-Water Fishes", detective story)
Adhunik Robin Hood (The Modern Robin Hood)	আধুনিক রবিনহুড	1940	Collection of short stories.
Andhakarer Bondhu (Friend of Darkness)	অন্ধকারের বন্ধু	1941	Detective fiction (Hemanta-Robin series).
Bhoy Dekhano Bhoyonkor (The Terrifying Terror)	ভয় দেখানো ভয়ংকর	1941	
Jerinar Kanthohaar (Jerina's Necklace)	জেরিনার কণ্ঠহার	1941	
Bharater Dwitiyo Probhate (The Second Morning of India)	ভারতের দ্বিতীয় প্রভাতে	1941	Historical fiction.
Mukh O Mukhosh (The Face and the Mask)	মুখ ও মুখোশ	1942	Detective fiction (Hemanta-Robin series).
Bhut Aar Adbhut (The Ghost and the Strange)	ভুত আর অদ্ভুত	1943	
Jakshopatir Ratnapuri (The Treasure Trove of Jakshopati)	যক্ষপতির রত্নপুরী	1943	
Surjonagarir Guptodhon (Inca's Treasures)	সূর্যনগরীর গুপ্তধন	1944	
Madhuchhatro (The Honey Umbrella)	মধুচ্ছত্র	1944	
Manusher Gora Doityo (The Man-made Demon)	মানুষের গড়া দৈত্য Loosely translated from Mary Shelley's Frankenstein	1944	
Rahasyer Alochhaya (The Mystery)	রহস্যের আলোছায়া	1944	
Tara Tin Bondhu (Three Friends)	তারা তিন বন্ধু	1945	
Bajrabhairaber Golpo		1946	
Dersho Khokar Kando		1947	
Mohan Mela		1947	
Bhagabaner Chabuk		1947	
Sundarbaner Raktapagal		1947	
Hatya Ebong Tarpor		1947	
Mrityumallar		1948	
Sulu-Sagarer Bhuture Desh		1948	
Ajana Dwiper Rani		1948	
Mohanpurer Smashan		1949	Translated from a story by Sheridan Le Fanu
Kumarer Bagha Goyenda		1949	
Bishalgarher Duhshasan		1949	Translated from Bram Stoker's Dracula
Chhotto Pomir Abhijaan		1949	
Sundarbaner Rakto Pagol		1950	
Amanushik Maanush		1950	
Count of Monte Cristo		1951	Translated from the story of the same name by Alexander Dumas
Alo Diye Gelo Jara		1952	
Nabajuger Mahadanab		1952	
Paban		1952	
Guptodhoner Duhswapno		1952	
Tapoban		1952	
Himachaler Swapno		1952	
Sotyikaar Sherlok Holmes		1953	
Baghrajar Abhijaan		1954	
Digbijoyi Napoleon		1956	
Chaturbhujer Swakkhor		1956	
Sonar Anaras		1956	
Chhatrapatir Chhora		1957	
Nishachori Bibhishika		1957	Translated from Enter the Saint by Leslie Charteris
Alexander the Great		1957	
Chhotoder Shreshto Golpo		1958	
Sajahaner Mayur		1958	
Bibhishaner Jagaran		1959	
Jayantar Adventure		1959	
Goyenda, Bhut O Manush		1959	
Chalo Galpo Niketane		1960	
Runu-Tunur Adventure		1960	
Itihaser Raktakto Prantare		1961	
He Itihas Golpo Bolo		1961	
Kuber Purir Rahasya		1961	
Chhotoder Bhalo Bhalo Golpo		1961	
Ratrir Jatri		1961	
Jagat Sether Ratnakuthi		1964	

- Podochinher upakhyan
- Rotnoguhar guptodhon
- Indrajaler maya
