= Tenida (film) =

2011 Bengali film

Tenida is a 2011 Bengali comedy adventure film directed by Chinmoy Roy and produced by Tower Solar System. It is loosely based on a Tenida novel Charmurtir Abhijan by Narayan Gangopadhyay. Director Roy himself played the part of Tenida in Charmurti in 1978.

== Plot ==
Tenida and his three friends Kyabla, Habul and Palaram are invited by uncle Kutty Mama for a visit to the jungles of Dooars on vacation. They go to Dooars and realise that there are poacher stealing the trees and animals of the forest. There are some terrorists also active inside the jungle. Tenida and his friends solve the problems.

== Cast ==
- Chinmoy Roy as Elephant doctor
- Subhasish Mukherjee as Tenida
- Biplab Chatterjee as Police inspector
- Bibhu Bhattacharya as Seth Dhundhuram
- Jui Banerjee
- Gaurav Dasgupta
- Ritam Bose
- Moinak Dutta
- Sreemonti Majumdar
- Tapas Chakraborty
- Gora Chowdhury
