= Sayantan Ghosal =

Indian film director (born 1988)

- Born: 15 September 1988 (age 38); Kolkata, West Bengal, India
- Education: Acharya Prafulla Chandra College; Kolkata Film and Television Institute
- Occupations: Director & Editor
- Years active: 2017-present
- Known for: Sagardwipey Jawker Dhan; Jawker Dhan; Satyanweshi Byomkesh; Tenida and Co. Lalbazar
- Spouse: Sayanti Ghosal (m. 18 January 2015)
- Children: 1

Sayantan Ghosal is an Indian film director and editor in Bengali cinema. He is best known for directing Jawkher Dhan franchise which fictional characters created by Bengali novelist Hemendra Kumar Roy. These are popular figures of Bengali Children's literature.

== Career ==
He made his directorial debut with adventure story of Bimal-Kumar duos of Hemendra Kumar Roy in the same name. In 1939, another Bengali film Jakher Dhan was made by director Haricharan Bhanja starring Ahindra Choudhury, Chhaya Devi and Jahar Ganguly.

== Personal life ==
Sayantan Ghosal is an alumnus of the Kolkata Film and Television Institute (KFTI). Ghosal graduated from the institute after earning a bachelor's degree from Acharya Prafulla Chandra College in West Bengal.

== Filmography ==
| No | Year | Film | Language | Notes |
|---|---|---|---|---|
| 1 | 2017 | Jawker Dhan | Bengali | Based on the adventure story of Bimal-Kumar duos of Hemendra Kumar Roy |
| 2 | 2018 | Alinagarer Golokdhadha | Bengali | |
| 3 | 2019 | Satyanweshi Byomkesh | Bengali | Based on the story of Magna Mainak, by Sharadindu Bandyopadhyay |
| 4 | 2019 | Sagardwipey Jawker Dhan | Bengali | A sequel to Jawker Dhan |
| 5 | 2020 | Nirbandhamer Jora Khun | Bengali | Under the banner of Zee Telefilms |
| 6 | 2022 | Swastik Sanket | Bengali | Based on Debaroti Mukhopadhyay's novel |
| 7 | 2022 | Hirakgorer Hire | Bengali | Zee5 Release |
| 8 | 2022 | LSD: Laal Suitcase Ta Dekhechen? | Bengali | |
| 9 | 2023 | Tenida and Co. | Bengali | Post Production; Based on Narayan Gangopadhyay's novel |
| 10 | 2025 | Sonar Kellay Jawker Dhan | Bengali | A sequel to Sagardwipey Jawker Dhan & 3rd part |
| 11 | 2025 | Rabindra Kabya Rahasya | Bengali | |
| 12 | 2025 | Madam Sengupta | Bengali | |
| 13 | 2025 | Saralakkha Holmes | Bengali | |
| 14 | 2026 | Sadhak Bamakhyapa | Bengali | |

== Web series and short films ==
| Year | Title | Language | Platform | Format |
|---|---|---|---|---|
| 2011 | The Silhouette-Darkness Prevails | Bengali | YouTube | Short Film |
| 2017-2018 | Byomkesh(S1-S3) | Bengali | Hoichoi | Web Series |
| 2018 | Dark Web | Bengali | Hoichoi | Web Series |
| 2018 | Shesh Theke Shuru | Bengali | Hoichoi | Web Original Film |
| 2020 | Lalbazaar | Bengali & Hindi | ZEE5 | Web Series |
| 2021 | Mouchaak | Bengali | Hoichoi | Web Series |
| 2021 | Indu | Bengali | Hoichoi | Web Series |
| 2022 | Gora | Bengali | Hoichoi | Web Series |
| 2022 | Sampurna | Bengali | Hoichoi | Web Series |
| 2023 | Raktakarabi | Bengali | ZEE5 | Web Series |
| 2023 | Homestay Murders | Bengali | Hoichoi | Web Series |
| 2023 | Sampurna 2 | Bengali | Hoichoi | Web Series |

== TVCs ==
| Year | Brand | Cast | Duration |
|---|---|---|---|
| 2020 | Sparkle Dishwash | Ridhima Ghosh & Gaurav Chakrabarty | 0:33 seconds |
| 2021 | Jovees Herbal | Gaurav Chakrabarty & Ritabhari Chakraborty | 0:42 seconds |

== Awards and nominations ==
| Year | Award | Category | Film/TV Show | Result |
|---|---|---|---|---|
| 2021 | Films and Frames Digital Film Awards | Best Director (OTT) | Lalbazar | Won |
| 2024 | International Film Festival of India | UNESCO Gandhi Medal Award | Rabindra Kabya Rahasya | nomination |
