= Tenida =

Indian Bengali comics fictional character

Tenida (টেনিদা)
- Tenida character
- Tenida as depicted on the cover of the comprehensive collection "Tenida Samagra".
- Created by: Narayan Gangopadhyay
- Portrayed by: Chinmoy Roy; Subhasish Mukhopadhyay; Kanchan Mallick
- Voiced by: Sabyasachi Chakrabarty

In-universe information
- Full name: Bhajahari Mukhejjee
- Nickname: Teni (টেনি), Bhaja (ভজ)
- Gender: Male
- Occupation: Student
- Religion: Hinduism
- Nationality: Indian (Bengali)
- Residence: Pataldanga, Kolkata
- Height: 6 feet 2 inches
- Friend(s): Pyalaram (Kamalesh Banerjee); Kyabla (Kushal Mitra); Habul (Swarnendu Sen)

Bhajahari Mukhujjee (Bengali: ভজহরি মুখার্জী), commonly known as Tenida (Bengali: টেনিদা) or Teni (see Tenida for da), is a fictional native of Potoldanga in Calcutta, who appears in a number of short stories and larger works of the Bengali author Narayan Gangopadhyay. The leader of a group of four young lads who lived in the neighbourhood of Potoldanga, Tenida was depicted as the local big-mouthed airhead, who, although not blessed with academic capabilities, was admired and respected by the other three for his presence of mind, courage, and honesty as well as his vociferous appetite. Descriptions of Tenida's nose also make frequent appearances in the text, being described as "a large nose resembling Mount Mainak". The narrator of the stories is Pyalaram, who seemed to share his leader's frailty in academic exertions. The other two characters who formed an integral part of the quartet were Habul, the brawny and Kyabla, the erudite among the four.

The stories of Tenida are basically two types. (i) Tenida narrates fabricated stories of his so-called heroism or stories of his relatives, specially the stories of his "five hundred and fifty five" maternal uncles (ii)Tenida & Pyala or all the four are involved in hilarious adventures where the gang goes through interesting situations but solves the mystery at the end. The short stories were extensively based in Calcutta and its suburbs, but the Charmurti traveled to Hajaribag, Duars, Darjeeling where their pleasure trip turned into a series of mysterious incidents.

The suffix da used after his actual nickname Teni is short for dada(elder brother) which is used to initiate conversations with an elderly male stranger in colloquial Bengali. The shorthand, used after a person's name, is a mark of respect and acknowledgment of seniority. He is the leader of the gang. He is an indigent Bengali Brahmin. In the earlier novels, he is shown as a timid person. However, in the later novels, he is portrayed as a brave person. In the story entitled as "Kombol Niruddesh" (Bengali: কম্বল নিরুদ্দেশ ), it is mentioned that he knows Karate, Boxing and Judo.In the same story, Tenida knocked down a man of 112 kg weight with a single swirl.

== History ==
In March 1946 Narayan Gangopadhyay, shifted to a rented house at Patoldanga, Kolkata, where his Landlord was Mr. Probhat Mukherjee (Tenida). Narayan Gangopadyay had a good relation with his landlord, to the extent where the two families were almost family friends. When Bishu Mukherjee approached him for stories for 'Mouchak". Tenida was created initially to mock his landlord in two stories "Matsya-Puran" & "Khattango O Pallanno". Other two characters Kybla & Habul were added subsequently and profile of Tenida also evolved.

== Other main characters ==
=== Pyalaram ===
Pyalaram (Bengali: প্যালারাম), the narrator of the stories, wrote from the point of view of the writer himself. He was a timid member and suffered from a chronic stomach ailment. His unfavourite food items appear to be potol diye singhi maacher jhol (a type of fish curry with Pointed gourd) and bashok patar rosh (the juice of the malabar nut leaf). Pyalaram followed Tenida's footsteps, having repeated his final year in school for two years before passing matriculation with the rest of the gang. Pyala's real name is Kamalesh Banerjee (Bengali: কমলেশ ব্যানার্জী). These names are listed, among other stories in the short novella in "Tenidar Abhijan" entitled "Charmurtir Abhijan". Like Tenida, he is also a Bengali Brahmin.

=== Kyabla ===
Kushal Mitra (Bengali: কুশল মিত্র) also known as Kyabla (Bengali: ক্যাবলা), is supposedly the most intelligent, smart and brave among them. Clever and the top among his classmates, this handsome and dapper young man is the backbone of this group. Tenida always looks up to Kyabla for finding solutions to tricky situations. Kyabla has solved all the mysteries in all the adventures that they have been to. He is the integral part of Tenida's gang. The word Kyabla in Bengali means stupid. He is a Bengali Kayastha by caste, and also the most hardworking one.

=== Habul ===
Habul Sen (Bengali: হাবুল সেন) stands out in having an independent character of the stories — he is timid but not as much as Pyalaram. He is also a very good student unlike Tenida and Pyalaram. Habul's real name is Swarnendu Sen (Bengali: স্বর্ণেন্দু সেন). In some novels, it is stated that he has expertise in boxing. In later novels it was known that, Habul's family hailed from Dhaka before moving to Calcutta.

== Books of Tenida ==
=== Novels ===
1. Charmurti (Bengali: চারমূর্তি)
2. Char Murtir Obhijan (Bengali: চারমূর্তির অভিযান)
3. Kombol Niruddesh (Bengali: কম্বল নিরুদ্দেশ)
4. Tenida Aar Sindhughotok (Bengali: টেনিদা আর সিন্ধুঘোটক)
5. Jhau-banglor Rahasyo (Bengali: ঝাউবাংলোর রহস্য)

=== Short stories ===
1. Dadhichi, Poka, O Bishwakarma (Bengali: দধীচি, পোকা ও বিশ্বকর্মা)
2. Khottango O Polanno (Bengali: খট্টাঙ্গ ও পলান্ন)
3. Matsyo-Puran (Bengali: মৎস্য-পুরাণ)
4. Peshawar Ki Aamir (Bengali: পেশোয়ার কী আমীর)
5. Kaak Kahini (Bengali: কাক কাহিনী)
6. Cricket Maane Jhijhi (Bengali: ক্রিকেট মানে ঝিঁঝিঁ)
7. Porer Upokaar Korio Na (Bengali: পরের উপকার করিও না)
8. Chengiz Aar Hamlin-Er Banshiwala (Bengali: চেঙ্গিস আর হ্যামলিনের বাঁশিওয়ালা)
9. Dhaus (Bengali: ঢাউস)
10. Nidarun Protishodh (Bengali: নিদারুণ প্রতিশোধ)
11. Tottwabodhan Maane-Jeebe Prem (Bengali: তত্বাবধান মানে-জীবে প্রেম)
12. Doshanoncharit (Bengali: দশাননচরিত)
13. The Great Chhantai (Bengali: দি গ্রেট ছাঁটাই)
14. Camouflage (Bengali: ক্যামোফ্লেজ)
15. Kuttimamar Haater Kaaj (Bengali: কুট্টিমামার হাতের কাজ)
16. Shanghatik (Bengali: সাংঘাতিক)
17. Bon-Bhojoner Byapar (Bengali: বন-ভোজনের ব্যাপার)
18. Kuttimamar Donto-Kahini (Bengali: কুট্টিমামার দন্ত-কাহিনী)
19. Probhatshongeet (Bengali: প্রভাতসঙ্গীত)
20. Bhojohari Film Corporation (Bengali: ভজহরি ফিল্ম কর্পোরেশন)
21. Chamchike Aar Ticket Checker (Bengali: চামচিকে আর টিকিট চেকার)
22. Brahmhobikasher Dontobikash (Bengali: ব্রহ্মবিকাশের দন্তবিকাশ)
23. Tiktikir Lyaj (Bengali: টিকটিকির ল্যাজ)
24. Bearing Chhaant (Bengali: বেয়ারিং ছাঁট)
25. Kankrabichhe (Bengali: কাঁকড়াবিছে)
26. Honolulur Makuda (Bengali: হনলুলুর মাকুদা)
27. Haalkhaataar Khaowadaowa (Bengali: হালখাতার খাওয়াদাওয়া)
28. Ghunteparar Shei Match (Bengali: ঘুঁটেপাড়ার সেই ম্যাচ)
29. Tenida Aar Yeti (Bengali: টেনিদা আর ইয়েতি)
30. Ekadoshir Ranchi Yatra (Bengali: একাদশীর রাঁচি যাত্রা)
31. Nyangchadar Hahakar (Bengali: ন্যাংচাদার হাহাকার)
32. Bhajagourango Katha (Bengali: ভজগৌরাঙ্গ কথা)
33. Ekti Football Match (Bengali: একটি ফুটবল ম্যাচ)

=== One-act play ===
1. Porer Upokar Korio Na (Bengali: পরের উপকার করিও না)

=== Essays about Tenida ===
1. Kichu Kotha: Boi Niye, Tenidake Niye (Bengali: কিছু কথা: ব‌ই নিয়ে, টেনিদাকে নিয়ে)
2. Potoldangar Shei Tenidar Boyosh Ekhon Ponchattor (Bengali: পটলডাঙার সেই টেনিদার বয়স এখন পঁচাত্তর)

=== Anthologies ===
1. Shomogro Kishore Sahitya (Bengali: সমগ্ৰ কিশোর সাহিত্য)
2. Tenida Samagra (Bengali: টেনিদা সমগ্র)

== In other media ==
=== Films ===
In 90's, Rabi Ghosh played Tenida in DD Bangla shows. Apart from this three Tenida films were released in Bengali.

- Charmurti (1978)

Based on the eponymous novel, this story is about the adventures of Tenida and Co. when they go for an outing near Ramgarh and happens to encounter a gang involved in making counterfeit bank-notes. The film was directed by Umanath Bhattacharya. In the film Chinmoy Roy played the role of Tenida.

- Tenida (film) (2011)

This film was loosely adapted from Charmurtir Abhijaan. It was directed by Chinmoy Roy, who previously played the role, and Subhasish Mukhopadhyay acted as Tenida in this film.

- Teni Da and Company (2023)

A Tenida film, adapted from Jhau-bunglor Rahasyo, directed by Sayantan Ghosal. Kanchan Mullick portrayed Tenida.

=== Animated TV series ===
An animated series featuring Tenida started airing on Zee Bangla. Tenida was voiced by Sabyasachi Chakrabarty, who is famous for playing Feluda in the recent films. Kyabla was voiced by Debasish Ghosh, who also wrote the script. Habul was voiced by Tapan Chakroborty. He was also the drama director. Pyalaa was voiced by Abhijit Biswas. Although none of the character's description of hair colour is given in the books, but in the comics, they all have black hair. But in this series, Tenida has red hair, Pyalaa has brown hair, Habul has violet and Kyabla has black hair.

=== Comics ===
The first comics was published in Anondomela Pujabarshiki in 80s — Crickter Tenida adapted from the story Cricket Maane Jhijhi.

The later comic adaptations were published through Anandamela. Arijit Dutta Chaudhuri illustrated these comics. Chronologically these comics are:

1. Jhau-bunglor Rahasyo
2. Tenida Aar Sindhughotok
3. Tenida Aar Yeti
4. Dadhichi, Poka, O Bishwakarma
5. Matsyo-Puran

First 3 of them are also available as comic books viz. Jhau-bunglor Rahasyo and Tenida: Sindhughotok Aar Yeti from Ananda Publishers .This comics are illustrated by Arijit Dutta Chaudhuri.

Recently, in 2009 Pujabarshiki Sandesh, edited by Sandip Ray, Harshomohan Chattoraj illustrated a comics on Tenida Story: Bhajagorango Katha.

In 2018, Tenidar Obhijaan a compilation of three comics (Bon Bhojoner Byapaar, Cricket Maane JhiJhi and Bhojogourango Katha) was published. Arijit Dutta Chaudhuri illustrated the comics. In 2020, Tenidar Obhijan (Vol. 2) was published. It contained the comics Kombol Niruddesh, illustrated by Arijit Dutta Chaudhuri.
