= Bindur Chhele =

Bindur Chhele may refer to:

- Bindur Chhele (1952 film)
- Bindur Chhele (1973 film)
