= Chitta Basu =

Chitta Basu may refer to:

- Chitta Basu (politician) (1926–1997), Indian politician
- Chitta Basu (director) (1907–1993), Indian director
