= Jawker Dhan =

2017 Indian Bengali-language film

- Directed by: Sayantan Ghosal
- Written by: Hemendra Kumar Roy
- Screenplay by: Sougata Basu‚ Anamitra Das
- Produced by: Ritum Jain
- Starring: Sabyasachi Chakraborty; Parambrata Chatterjee; Kaushik Sen; Priyanka Sarkar
- Cinematography: Sudipta Mazumdar
- Edited by: Sayantan Ghosal
- Music by: Meemo
- Production company: Champion Movies
- Release date: 4 August 2017
- Running time: 108 min.
- Country: India
- Language: Bengali

Jawker Dhan (The Treasure of Yaksha) is a Bengali action adventure film of 2017 directed by Sayantan Ghosal. This movie was based on the adventure story of Bimal-Kumar duos of Hemendra Kumar Roy in the same name. In 1939, another Bengali film Jakher Dhan was made by director Haricharan Bhanja starring Ahindra Choudhury, Chhaya Devi and Jahar Ganguly. A sequel titled Sagardwipey Jawker Dhan was released in 2019. Addatimes streamed this on 15 April 2021 on the OTT platform.

== Plot ==
Kumar discovers a puzzle engraved in a human skull. The skull was stored by his grandfather long ago. Unable to solve the puzzle, he consults his close friend Bimal to find out the secret behind it. Bimal is adventurous and also a professor of Anthropometry. They solve the puzzle and realise that this is nothing but a clue of a hidden Tibetan treasure which is concealed in an undisclosed spot in the dense jungles of Neora Valley. By this time, Bimal's elder brother, Hiranmoy, is appointed by a rich man named Karali to solve another riddle in Tibetan. When Hiranamoy almost solves the riddle, he gets kidnapped by an unknown group. Bimal and Kumar together start an adventure to recover the treasure and rescue Hiranmoy but Karali is also in a hunt for this treasure. Karali is ruthless and dares to capture the treasure at any cost.

== Cast ==
- Parambrata Chatterjee as Bimal Sen
- Rahul Banerjee as Kumar Ray
- Sabyasachi Chakrabarty as Karali Mukhopadhyay
- Priyanka Sarkar as Sharmistha Bose
- Kaushik Sen as Hiranmoy Bose
- Samidh Mukherjee as Shombhu Gomphu
- Arindol Bagchi

== Soundtrack ==
no	Song	Singer
1	"Kistimaat"	Silajit Majumdar
2	"Chhaya Juddho"	Rupam Islam, Sanchari Choudhury
3	"Abhijaan"	Shaan (singer)
