= Jakher Dhan =

1939 Bengali film

- Directed by: Haricharan Bhanja
- Written by: Hemendra Kumar Roy (novel)
- Produced by: East India Film Company
- Starring: Ahindra Choudhury; Jahar Ganguly; Chhaya Devi; Kumar Mitra; Mrinalkanti Ghosh; Rabi Ray; Sheila Haldar; Sushil Ray; Radharani; Shishubala
- Production company: East India Film Company
- Release date: 1 April 1939
- Country: India
- Language: Bengali

Jakher Dhan is a Bengali adventure thriller film directed by Haricharan Bhanja based on a same name novel of Hemendra Kumar Roy. This is the first film of Bimal-Kumar series, released on 1 April 1939 under the banner of East India Film Company.

== Plot ==
Bimal and Kumar, two daredevil Bengali friends, like to go on adventures. One day Kumar finds a map of treasure in his grandfather's trunk. He discloses it to his friend Bimal. Bimal and Kumar together travel to the unknown jungle to discover the hidden treasure. One dangerous person, Karali Mukherjee, also wants the treasure, and chases them secretly to capture it by any means.

== Cast ==
- Ahindra Choudhury
- Jahar Ganguly
- Chhaya Devi
- Kumar Mitra
- Mrinalkanti Ghosh
- Rabi Ray
- Sheila Haldar
- Sushil Ray
- Radharani
- Shishubala

== See also ==
- Jawker Dhan
- Sagardwipey Jawker Dhan
