= Indira (1937 film) =

- ইন্দিরা (Bengali)
- Directed by: Tarit Bose
- Written by: Tarit Bose
- Based on: Indira by Bankim Chandra Chatterjee
- Produced by: G. C. Talkies
- Starring: Ahindra Choudhury; Angurbala; Binoykumar Goswami; Sefalika Devi
- Music by: Ramchandra Pal
- Distributed by: Prima Films
- Release date: 10 July 1937
- Country: India
- Language: Bengali

Indira is a Bengali drama film directed by Tarit Bose based on the same name novel of Bankim Chandra Chatterjee. This film was released on 10 July 1937 under the banner of Prima Films.

== Plot ==
Indira, a young woman of Zaminder family abducted by dacoits and separated from her family. In an attempt to reclaim her place in life and win back her husband, she disguises herself as a seductive house maid in her husband's household.

== Cast ==
- Ahindra Choudhury as Raman
- Angurbala as Piyari Thandidi
- Jyotsna Gupta as Indira
- Binoykumar Goswami
- Sefalika Devi as Shubhashini
- Manorama Devi
- Kusumkumari
- Lalit Mitra
- Padmabati
- Phani Roy
- Bechu Singha

== Remakes ==
Bankim Chandra Chatterjee's novella Indira was previously adapted as Indira a silent film in 1929 by B. S. Rajhans and Durgadas Bannerjee. Following the 1937 talkie adaptation by Tarit Bose, the story was adapted for the screen again as Indira in 1950 by director Ardhendu Mukhopadhyay. In 1983, Dinen Gupta directed another film Indira based on the same novel.
