= Meghduter Morte Agomon =

1933 novel by Hemendra Kumar Roy

- Author: Hemendra Kumar Roy
- Language: Bengali
- Genre: Science fiction, Adventure fiction
- Set in: Bilaspur, Bengal
- Publication date: 1933
- Publication place: India

Meghduter Morte Agomon (1933) is a Bengali science fiction adventure novel for young adults by Hemendra Kumar Roy.

== Summary ==
Kamal received an urgent letter from Binoy Majumdar to come to his house, where he found out about the sensational piece of newspaper coverage that talked about the mysterious disappearances in Bilaspur pertaining to a steamer with several Khalasi people onboard, a large banyan tree home to numerous monkeys and an engine- all within such a short amount of time that the newspaper claimed that the incidents could not be man-made and that local people did not go out during the evenings, claiming that mysterious sounds accompanied by cold wind heralded those mysterious events. While he became convinced about it being the work of a ghost, Binoy disagreed and decided to leave for Bilaspur that evening to investigate it and invited Kamal to tag along with him on the adventure.

Upon reaching Bilaspur, the duo agreed to spend the night in the Dak bungalow close to the station. Kamal and Binoy went to the Shitola temple where they investigated the enormous hole in the ground where the old banyan tree was uprooted from. By the time they returned, the village was quiet and people had shut themselves in their houses, and Binoy and Kamal came across two young men sitting on two chairs in the verandah of the Dak bungalow, who introduced themselves as Bimal Chandra Roy and Kumar Nath Sen, and decided to team up with Binoy and Kamal. Their servant Ramhori is introduced right after, who came in with a dog of massive proportions, lovingly named Bagha. It was after Kamal connected the dots that Bimal and Kumar revealed that they were the same men from the novel Jaker Dhon.

Later deep into the night, everyone woke up due to the suddenly cold wind and heard the sound of a man’s scream and the bark of a dog. Running to the source of the sounds, they found Bagha being pulled up in the sky by some mysterious force. Binoy also noticed that the water from the pond was also absent. Binoy presented the facts on Mars being closest to Earth, definite proof of intelligent life on Mars in the way the canals are dug too cleanly to be natural and the confusing radio signals disrupting the radio stations on Earth as evidence of how the Martians were more advanced and had begun coming to Earth in order to collect samples to study them. He made an educated guess that the Martians created an air-tight spaceship and used a powerful and large vacuum cleaner-like technology. Later, he and his companions saw the remains of a human body fall from the sky. Despite Kamal's speculation that the man jumped from the spaceship, Binoy refuted it saying that the man had been experimented on by the Martians. He further cites this as evidence that Martians must be vastly different from humanity appearance-wise. Binoy thought it was quite possible that soon enough the attacks on humanity limited to Bilaspur had the potential to spread to the rest of the world.

The next day, Bimal read Binoy's essay on the topic in the newspaper which also stated that the famed radio inventor Marconi had once tried to establish contact between the humans and the Martians but ultimately failed. The newspaper made the residents of Bilaspur more curious to know more about the Martians. Binoy left the bungalow the next evening without informing his companions, who later found him in the bamboo forest where he told them about his observations of the massive spaceship in broad daylight, hinting that the Martians grew bolder day by day. Upon the return of the spaceship, Binoy and his companions were sucked into it. He was glad for the incredible opportunity to study this new world of knowledge. When one of the walls of their room gradually opened, they got their first glimpse of the Martians. Despite initial resistance from Bimal, the men were shackled and led down a broad path. They discovered the banyan tree of Bilaspur and its resident monkeys shackled, the vanished water from the pond of Bilaspur kept contained in a water tank and a room where around 50-60 humans chained by their legs. Bimal fought the Martians with his gun, later joined by Kumar, which killed a few Martians and scared the rest greatly.

The opening of firearms resulted in a hole in the body of the spaceship which the Martians hurried to patch up while leaving the humans to their own devices. They decided to use the opportunity to free the rest of the humans, who all banded together in their decision to stand against the Martians and managed to secure food and water from their captors. However, later they looked through the transparent substance down below and realised that they were already in space, hurtling towards a red planet that Binoy identified as Mars, named after the Roman God of War Mars for its distinct coloring. In the following days, it became clear that the Martians were terrified by their firearms. Binoy reassured Bimal by saying that they will be fine on Mars due to similar atmospheric conditions. Sometime later, the humans could view Earth as a distant shape in the darkness that just went on to show how far from home they all truly were.

Binoy sensibly warned everyone to be alert upon reaching Mars and was quite taken by the Martian's advanced intelligence and knowledge that expressed itself in the innovations present on the planet. The Martians brought in a new big instrument to ensure compliance that Binoy guessed to be similar to the vacuum that kidnapped the humans from Earth. However, when they were instructed to leave the spaceship, Binoy remembered the difference of gravity on Mars to Earth and passed the idea to his fellow humans to use massive jumps aided by weakened gravity of Mars to make great distance between themselves and the astonished Martians undoubtedly in pursuit of them. They went and took shelter in the cave of a small mountain nearby to escape notice of the Martian spaceships searching for their escaped captives. However, it soon became evident that there was no food left to sustain them. This was remedied momentarily by the humans attacking the Martians carrying harvest to presumably sell in the city. As a result, Bimal's idea of going into the city during the night to spy on the plans that Martians have for them in the future and to steal some food back to their hideout was accepted by everyone. Meanwhile they got reunited with Kumar's dear dog Bagha and found out about the existence of a strange four-legged Martian bird that made human-sounding voice.

Following the plan, they came closer to the Martian city but changed course when they noticed the relatively unguarded spaceship stationed outside the city and decided to attack it instead. Although the idea was to loot it for food, Binoy instead planned for the spaceship to take the Earth-dwellers back to their home planet before the gradually increasing distance made it impossible. Bimal's gun ensured the compliance of the Martians who flew the spaceship and it successfully left the Martian atmosphere without further trouble. The story comes to an end when the spaceship touches down on a planet that the humans realise might not be the same Earth that they had left behind, leaving the novel an open-ended mystery.

== Background ==
The novel is science fiction and an adventure story intended for young adults. It was inspired by H.G. Well's "The War of the Worlds". It was published during a time when humanity was first discovering Mars and potential proof of life on the planet, that led to the excitement and spark that inspired several people to imagine the life forms on Mars and their possible interaction with humanity.

It is important to recognise that the novel was written in a pre-Independent India. As a result, it is of paramount importance that the historical background is also read into the novel itself. During 1930s, the Indians were actively working against the colonial powers to gain Independence. That tension between the two species in the novel during their first interaction becomes palpable when read from that perspective. There was a clear hierarchy present in the ranks of the Martians as evident from Binoy's observation of how the Martian sepoy wearing red coat bowed to the Martian wearing a green coat. The golden shackles that tied the legs on the monkeys, men and the hands of the protagonists alike are indicative of the themes of slavery. Bimal had mentioned twice in the novel that he would prefer to be dead trying to fight against the Martians than be enslaved by them and be experimented on. This is a central theme of the novel where the advanced Martians trying to understand the ways of life of the other species had become the oppressors of humanity, which resonates with the historical events going on at the time.

== Characters ==
- Kamal - Kamal is the young sidekick of Binoy babu, whom he met in Madhupur at 19 years old. He is described as a great listener and had believed the ramblings of Binoy from the very beginning, which created a lasting friendship between the two. He is also depicted to be capable of drawing conclusions from observing his surroundings as proven when he correctly deduces that Martians did not possess the firearm technology that was prevalent on Earth. He also asks pertinent questions based on the immediate problems at hand, which shows his situational awareness.
- Binoy Majumdar - Binoy is the protagonist and described as a fair-skinned man of average height but broad in physique with great strength, who had unbrushed hair interspersed with black and white colors that matched his moustache and his long beard. He is a man of academia who is interested in science, logic and books, and far removed from the everyday business of domestic life. He has instruments like the telescope to view the secrets of the endless sky from the roof top of his house and likes to be up to date with the latest news on planets and stars. His stories on such astronomical things seemed to be so outlandish that his friends laughed at him and some even called him mad. Due to the affable nature of Binoy, there was no difference in his interactions with people from different age groups. He is a creature of scientific temper and logic who always judges his surroundings rationally and his strength lies in never underestimating his enemies. However, his weakness lies in the fact that he is always more taken with the excitement of gaining new knowledge than instantly thinking of the dangers that are consequently the result of attaining said knowledge.
- Bimal Chandra Roy - Bimal is portrayed as a tall and broad man who possessed the strength akin to a monster, according to Kamal. He is the same Bimal from the story Jaker Dhon. He is drawn to danger and chases dangerous situations, which also brought him to Bilaspur. He is also a hot-tempered man who is prone to losing his cool as evident from his getting mad at Ramhori for foolishly mistaking the Martians for Gods and carrying a gun in order to intimidate the Martians. He is described to take things at face value and confront situations head-on which is proven when he judges the Martians with advanced technology as "negligible" due to their height alone.
- Kumar Nath Sen - Kumar is an empathetic man and is described as being able to discern the fear of his dog Bagha from the sound of his bark alone. He loves his dog and was very saddened by his disappearance, mourning his temporary loss greatly. He is a much more even-tempered man than his counterpart Bimal and loved his dog greatly enough to leave his safe hideout in the caves when he heard him barking. He is further depicted as a faithful partner of Bimal who charges alongside him in dangerous situations.
- Ramhori - Ramhori serves as a comic relief in serious scenarios. He is a man who is firm believer of superstitions and religion, as is evident from his belief that it was a fairy who kidnapped Bagha. He is not a Christian like his master Bimal and near believed that it was the Gods who were coming down to Earth from his half understanding of Binoy's explanation on how these mysterious Martians were beings who lived in spaceships in the sky. He is also depicted as a bit of a coward when he urged Binoy and the rest of their companions to leave the policemen to their fates and run while they still had time to escape the notice of the fearsome Martian spaceship. His first reaction to seeing the Martians was to think they were the helpers of death who came to drag them to hell, proving his god-fearing and cowardice nature. He furthermore is evidently a man who has clear weakness for the fineries in life, as he was more interested in not returning the shackles once he learnt they were entirely made of gold and forgot momentarily his dire situation with the Martians. However, it is undeniable that his loyalty and care for his masters Bimal and Kumar are unparalleled as evident from when he attempted to shield Bimal from the first attack of the Martians when they came to take away Bimol's firearm.
- Martians - They are described to have big heads, especially from their forehead to skull, and had a face similar to the shape of a triangle. They have round eyes with red irises akin to bloodred hibiscus and ears as pointy as horns. They also are depicted to have one gap for where the nose should have been, and their lips are portrayed as curved as a bow. Despite having legs and hands similar to humans, they were unnaturally spindly and out of their height near 3ft in total, 1.5ft of it was just the height of their heads and faces. Their skin tone is likened to a slate, and they have no hair on their heads. They conversed in a language incomprehensible to the humans and used gestures to communicate with their captives. Martians are recognised by Binoy to be civilised, intellectually advanced and scientifically ahead of the humans by leaps and bounds.
