= Tenida and Co. =

Bengali adventure-comedy film

- Directed by: Sayantan Ghosal
- Screenplay by: Sougata Basu
- Dialogues by: Sougata Basu
- Story by: Narayan Gangopadhyay
- Based on: Jhau Bungalowr Rahasya
- Starring: Kanchan Mullick; Gaurav Chakrabarty; Sabyasachi Chakrabarty; Ridhima Ghosh
- Cinematography: Ramyadip Saha
- Edited by: Subhajit Singha
- Music by: Mimo
- Production company: Surinder Films
- Distributed by: Surinder Films
- Release date: 19 May 2023
- Country: India
- Language: Bengali

Tenida and Co. is a Bengali adventure comedy film directed by Sayantan Ghosal based on the novel Jhau Bungalowr Rahasya by Narayan Gangopadhyay. This is the third film of Tenida series and Kanchan Mullick plays the role of the main protagonist, Tenida.

== Plot ==
Tenida and his friends Kyabla, Habul, Pala go for a vacation in Darjeeling. One scientist Satkari Santra asks them for help to protect his valuable formula from a Japani spy Kagamachi. Satkari invites Tenida and his associates in his residence, Jhau Bungalow but Kyabla finds Satkari to be a very misleading person. They try to reveal the mystery behind Satkari's story.

== Cast ==
- Kanchan Mullick as Tenida
- Gaurav Chakrabarty as Kushal Mitra aka Kyabla
- Sabyasachi Chakrabarty as Satkari Santra/Nakari Santra
- Ridhima Ghosh as Anwesha
- Mithu Chakrabarty as Madhobi/Satkari Santra's wife
- Soumendra Bhattacharya as Pyala
- Sourav Saha as Habul

== Reception ==
Tenida and Co. opened to mixed response from the audience. Ujjainee Roy of The Times of India rated the film 2.5 out of 5 stars and wrote " The film has a large number of loopholes in terms of the storytelling and many characters are under utilised. However, a Tenida lover can watch this film in the theatres." Agnivo Niyogi of The Telegraph wrote "The camaraderie and chemistry between the characters is the driving force behind TeniDa and Company. But the film failed to deliver on the nostalgic quotient."

Subhasmita Kanji of Hindustan Times wrote "The scenes throughout the film seemed to be forced one after the other and there was no continuity among the. Overall, the film is a huge disappointment. Bongo Banjo reviewed the film on a positive note saying " "Tenida and Company" is a delightful comedy drama that leaves a lasting impression. With its engaging storyline, stellar performances, and a perfect blend of comedy and drama, the film deserves recognition and appreciation." Shamayita Chakraborty of OTTPlay rated the film 2.5 out of 5 stars and wrote " Despite a unengaging first half and weak screenplay, the film is a one-time watch, especially for children."
