= Achena Mukh =

1986 Indian Bengali film

Achena Mukh is an Indian Bengali-language thriller drama film directed by Ajit Lahiri and produced by Nani Gangopadhyay based on a novel of Shaktipada Rajguru. The film was released on 27 June 1986 under the banner of Elam Films.

== Plot ==
Subimal Mukherjee, an idealistic young man, takes up a job as a mine manager. He opposes the exploitation of workers by the mining mafia and strikes up a friendship with Koiree, one of the workers. At Subimal's call, a strike is launched at the mine. Some unscrupulous leader seek the help of local goon Shobhanlal to break the strike.

== Cast ==
- Soumitra Chatterjee as Subimal Mukherjee
- Khushi Mukherjee as Subimal's lover
- Sandhya Roy
- Bhanu Bandopadhyay
- Chinmoy Roy
- Sumanta Mukhopadhyay as Koiree
- Nani Gangopadhyay
- Nirmal Ghosh
- Sailen Mukhopadhyay
