= Kajal Gupta =

Bengali film actress

- Gupta in the film Ajantrik (1958)
- Born: Sandhya Chattopadhyay; 8 January 1936; Calcutta, Bengal Presidency, British India (now India)
- Died: 22 October 1996 (aged 60); Kolkata, West Bengal, India
- Occupation: Actress
- Notable work: Ajantrik (1958)
- Spouse: Dinen Gupta
- Children: Sonali Gupta

Kajal Gupta (Bengali: কাজল গুপ্ত, born as Sandhya Chattopadhyay, 8 January 1936 – 22 October 1996) was an Indian Bengali film actress known for Basanta Bilap (1973), Sansarer Itikatha (1983) and Agnishwar (1975).

== Biography ==
Kajal Gupta was born on 8 January 1936 in Calcutta, (now Kolkata), Bengal Presidency, British India (now India) as Sandhya Chattopadhyay. She was married to director Dinen Gupta, who directed her in Basanta Bilap. She died in Kolkata, West Bengal, India on 22 October 1996.

== Filmography ==
- Nati Binodini (1994)
- Antaranga (1988)
- Hirer Shikal (1988)
- Abir (1987)
- Mahamilan (1987)
- Abhimaan (1986)
- Amar Kantak (film) (1986)
- Rashifal (1984)
- Agami Kal (1983)
- Indira (1983 film) (1983)
- Arpita (1983)
- Sansarer Itikatha (1983)
- Priyatama (1980)
- Bandhan (1980)
- Tilottama (1978)
- Charmurti (1978)
- Sanai (1977)
- Dampati (1976)
- Harmonium (1976)
- Raag Anurag (1975)
- Agnishwar (1975)
- Sangini (1974)
- Marjina Abdulla (1973)
- Basanta Bilap (1973)
- Ajker Nayak (1972)
- Jaban (1972)
- Banajyotsna (1969)
- The New Leaf (1969)
- Mukhujey Paribar (1965)
- Jatugriha (1964)
- Kancher Swarga (1962)
- Ajantrik (1958)
