= Chupi Chupi Aashey =

1960 film

Chupi Chupi Aashey (Silently he comes) is a 1960 Bengali murder mystery film directed by Premendra Mitra. This film was released by Aurora Film Corporation and music scored by Nachiketa Ghosh. Sandhya Mukherjee sings the title song. Chupi Chupi Aashey was adapted from Agatha Christie's radio play and short story Three Blind Mice and stage play The Mousetrap.

== Plot ==
Two partners, Prabir and Kanika, start a hotel business and advertise through handbills. The name of the hotel is Kalyaneshwari Health Resort. At the same time, an unknown person commits a murder in Kolkata, and two workers find a copy of that handbill which fell from the pocket of the murderer. The police sends a detective, Inspector Ghoshal, to the Kalyaneswari guest house to prevent another murder. The guest house is surrounded by water due to heavy flooding. All communications gradually stop because of continuous rainfall. Before the flood, several guests, namely Dr. Bajpayee, Miss Dhar, Beni Babu, Radheshyam Viraswami, and Madhusudan Dutta, had checked into the hotel. Most of the guests have a dark past and are involved with a mysterious incident at an orphanage. All of them are masked with false names and identities. The police detective comes by a small boat, but the next day someone releases the boat. Meanwhile, the main culprit kills Miss Dhar in her room. Prabir and Kanika start suspecting each other. Now it is up to Inspector Ghoshal to find the identity of the murderer. He prepares everyone for a final showdown with the culprit.

== Cast ==
- Chhabi Biswas as Beni Babu
- Jahar Ganguly as Vira Swami
- Tarun Kumar as Inspector Ghoshal
- Rabin Majumdar as Prabir
- Dhiraj Das
- Tapati Debi
- Prabir Kumar
- Asha Debi
