= Alinagarer Golokdhadha =

- The official theatrical release poster of the film
- Directed by: Sayantan Ghosal
- Written by: Sougata Basu
- Screenplay by: Sougata Basu
- Story by: Sougata Basu
- Produced by: Ritum Jain
- Starring: Anirban Bhattacharya; Kaushik Sen; Parno Mitra; Paran Bandopadhyay; Tanima Sen; Manoj Mitra
- Cinematography: Sudipta Majumdar
- Music by: Memmo S Ray
- Production company: Champion Movies
- Distributed by: Eros International
- Release date: 20 April 2018
- Running time: 2 hours 19 minutes
- Country: India
- Language: Bengali

Alinagarer Golokdhadha (English: The Maze of Alinagar) is an adventure mystery film directed by Sayantan Ghosal. Produced by Rutrum Juin under a collaboration between Eros International and Champion Movies, the film stars Anirban Bhattacharya and Parno Mittra in lead roles. It was released theatrically on 20 April 2018.

== Plot ==
In 1990, the last surviving member of a family of landlords in Murshidabad auctions off his valuable possessions to the local villagers, for very low returns. Among those valuables was an old sword, which was surprisingly bought by Somnath Das for 1000 rupees. Soon he is approached by a businessman, Amirchand Mittal, who offers him 10 lakh rupees in exchange of the sword. Somnath declines the offer. Amirchand is followed by a police officer, who in turn is killed by the businessman's goons. Unfortunately, Somnath becomes the unwitting eye-witness of the murder. The goons follow him and shoot at him, but he escapes, only to be run over by a car in the highway.

In the present day, Soham and Brishti are taking a tour of Kolkata, while Soham explains its histories. He is interested in a historical research of Bengal and Kolkata, to which end Brishti recommends him to her father Ashutosh Singha, a renowned historian and author of Banglar Ayna, a book on Bengal's history, for a scholarship. Ashutosh is being interviewed by Jahnabi, an independent documentary film maker, but his mind is disturbed. He is being sent a number of unnamed chits, each stating the circumstances in which the conspirators against Siraj ud-Daulah, the last independent Nawab of Bengal, died. Brishti brushes these off as pranks, but Soham deduces that it has something to do with her father's book. Soham is introduced to Ashutosh at the latter's house, and Ashutosh agrees upon granting Soham the scholarship, and requests him to stay at his house only. Soham is introduced to Sakkhi Gopal, the caretaker of the house and a distant relative of Ashutosh.

Ashutosh tells Soham about his friend Somnath, who was killed in a road accident 27 years ago. Interestingly, Somnath was also a student of Bengal's history. Just before his death, he had told Ashutosh about a gift he wished to send him, but due to its unprecedented historical value, he has hidden it somewhere, the clue to which he had sent to Ashutosh in a letter. Soham is immediately interested in the riddle, which hints at a particular house and Warren Hastings' court case against Maharaja Nandakumar. With a little help from an old priest, Soham cracks the riddle, which leads him and Brishti to the house of Somnath's professor, also named Nandakumar. The professor, now almost blind due to old age, reveals that Somnath had sent him a letter as well, including a second riddle, telling him to give it to the person who comes to his house after solving the first riddle. The second letter says something about Dinabandhu Mitra's Neel Darpan, its translation to English by Michael Madhusudan Dutt, and the arrest of Reverend James Long for publishing the same (the British Government had declared the play as seditious). Meanwhile, Brishti's brother Abhiraj, a spoilt brat, has huge loans from Amirchand, who tells him to deliver a nose-ring, belonging to the family deity, which is a prized possession of the family.

Soham and Brishti's quest brings them to James Long Sarani, where the owner of one "Dinabandhu Mistanna Bhandar" (sweet shop) performs the act of burying a ledikeni sweet in the ground. He reveals that his father, the previous owner of the shop, knew Somnath well, and was told by him to do this in front of the person who solved the second riddle. Soham deduces that burying a ledikeni stands for the grave of Lady Canning in Barrackpore, since the sweet was specially made on the occasion of her arrival in India. Soham and Brishti travel there, and find a gardener whom Somnath knew and had also given a riddle. The gardener was about to tell Soham how he seemed to be related to Somnath, when suddenly he is shot dead. Brishti and Soham escape with the letter. Brishti suddenly sees Jahnabi, who she had previously spotted following them while entering Nandakumar's house.

After solving the clue from the third letter, the duo travel to a lock-maker's shop called Black Pagoda, in North Kolkata, which was cryptically hinted at in the gardener's letter. Soham learns that Somnath had ordered for a specific lock from the current owner's father, the previous owner. The lock had a number combination system, made break-proof by the fact that anyone entering a wrong combination would be injured by gunpowder blast, incorporated in the lock itself. The owner delivers the next clue to them via a telephone call with his father, which hints at going to Old Mission Church, where Madhusudan Dutt was converted to Christianity. The Father of the church gives Soham another letter, but just as he was about to tell him more about Somnath, he is shot dead, much like the gardener in Barrackpore. Meanwhile, the nose-ring of the Singha family's deity gets stolen by Abhiraj. Amirchand, however, is furious with Abhiraj for delivering him a fake.

A throwaway sentence by Sakkhi Gopal strikes Soham when he understands that Sakkhi knew Somnath very well. He urges Sakkhi to tell him the real identity of Somnath. The next morning Brishti finds Soham visibly disturbed. He reveals that the letter from the Father hinted at going to a Kali temple in Central Kolkata, where the last riddle was to be found. Soham had already been there and had also solved the riddle, which takes him to Bagbajar library's north east corner, where the specially made gunpowder locker was found behind a photograph of Ramprasad Sen. Soham and the librarian open the locker with the numbers found at the end of every letter. They find a final riddle along with a map; however, they are ambushed by Amirchand and his goons, who were following Soham. In the ensuing clash, the librarian is killed and the map and the riddle stolen by Amirchand, who finalizes selling the gift to a foreign buyer for 35 crore rupees.

Back at the Singha family household, Abhiraj beats up Sakkhi's son, a drunkard, for stealing the original nose-ring, which he continuously denies. Ashutosh watches the whole drama silently, even as Sakkhi begs him to stop Abhiraj. Brishti is upset with her father not protesting Abhiraj's misconduct, to which Ashutosh reveals that he knows about Abhiraj stealing the nose-ring, shown to him by Jahnabi on her camera. Sensing that Abhiraj might do something like this to have something to mortgage to Amirchand, she had replaced the original with a fake. However, Sakkhi had had enough of Ashutosh, and reveals everything to Brishti about how her father's aristocratic lifestyle led him to mortgage everything, even the house itself, to Amirchand. The latter had agreed to waive off Ashutosh's loans if he delivered him the gift Somnath told Ashutosh about. While witnessing the murder of the police officer at the hands of Amirchand, Somnath had also spotted Ashutosh, who was present right beside Amirchand at that moment, revealing his betrayal. Sakkhi went on to reveal the real identity of Soham— he is the son of Somnath. Brishti and Abhiraj are both upset by this revelation about their father and leaves the room. Sakkhi then hands Ashutosh the final chit, stating the circumstances of Mir Jafar's death, the prime conspirator against Siraj ud-Daulah, thus revealing that the chits were being sent by him all along.

Brishti finds Soham in the library, and together they head for Murshidabad, where the gift was located. Soham remembers how the last riddle hinted at Khoshbagh, the final resting place of Siraj ud-Daulah, who had renamed Kolkata to Alinagar when he had captured Fort William from the British. The riddle also hinted at Katra mosque to be where the gift is to be found. Unfortunately, by the time they solve the riddle and reach Katra mosque, Amirchand and his goons are already there, digging. Soham and Brishti are apprehended by the goons, while Amirchand ignores Soham's warning about not to touch the gift, as told by the riddle. The gift is revealed to be the same sword that Somnath had bought from the auction in 1990. The sword actually belonged to Siraj ud-Daulah, which was gifted to him by the French traders as a sign of their alliance, hence its unprecedented historical value. As soon as Amirchand touches it, an electric shock stuns him and knocks him out. It is then revealed that Somnath had carefully placed the sword upon a high voltage wire supplying electricity to the whole of Murshidabad and Berhampore, to keep it from wrong people who choose to ignore the warnings in the riddle. Soham and Brishti are saved by Jahnabi, who reveals herself as a CID officer, investigating the 1990 murder case, and also the daughter of the murdered police officer.

In the end, Ashutosh is arrested for being an accomplice in the crime, and the sword itself is given to the museum for safekeeping, now that Amirchand has been apprehended. Ashutosh reveals to Soham that in Somnath's absence, he printed and published Somnath's original manuscript of Banglar Ayna in his own name, linking the chits to this act of betrayal. Ashutosh is taken away while Soham turns around to see a metaphorical glimpse of his father.

== Cast ==
Actor	Character	Notes
Anirban Bhattacharya	Soham	An aspiring research worker in the field of history of Bengal
Parno Mittra	Brishti	Soham's girlfriend who accompanies him in the quest to find Siraj ud-Daulah's sword
Paran Bandopadhyay	Sakkhi Gopal	The aged caretaker of Singha household who knows many secrets of the family
Pujarini Ghosh	Jahnabi/Barnali Sen	A documentary film maker who is later revealed to be a CID officer
Koushik Sen	Ashutosh Singha	Brishti's father, historian and author of Banglar Ayna
Tribikram Ghosh	Somnath Das	The friend of Ashutosh, later revealed to be Soham's father, who created all the riddles leading to the sword
Monu Mukherjee	Thakurmoshai	An old priest who helped Soham with the first riddle
Manoj Mitra	Nandakumar	Somnath's professor during his college days, who has now become almost blind due to old age
Koushik Kar	Abhiraj	Brishti's brother, who is desperate to free himself from Amirchand's debts
Sibaji Banerjee	Gardener	The gardener at Lady Canning's grave, Barrackpore, who knew Somnath well
Goutam Halder	Amirchand Mittal	A businessman, who is after the sword for 27 years in order to sell it to a foreign buyer for 35 crores

== Soundtrack ==
The music of the film has been composed by Meemo S Ray. The first song from the movie Itihaash Kobita has been sung by Rupam Islam.

=== Track listing ===
Track Lisiting
No.	Title	Writer(s)	singer	Length
1.	"Itihas Kobita"	Memmo S Ray	Rupam Islam	5:01
2.	"Shohorer Upadhi"	Memmo S Ray	Debanjali Biswas	4:00

== Production ==
In 2016 Champion Movies first ventured into the production of Bengali films with Jawker Dhan. The film was a huge success and it established Champion Movies as one of the prominent production houses in Tollywood. After the grand success of the first film, they started their works on Alinagarer Golokdhadha, under the direction of Sayantan Ghosal. For this film, the team primarily shot at Nimtita Raajbaari, where Satyajit Ray shot his Bengali classic 'Jalsaghar'. Shooting took place across various heritage buildings and sights like Old Mission Church, Thanthania Kalibari, St. Paul's Cathedral, Lady Cannings burial ground in Barrackpore, Basu Bati Library, Katra Masjid, Khoshbagh etc. The climax of the movie has been shot in Murshidabad.

== Reception ==
Roushni Sarkar from Cinestaan praised the film's story and Paran Bandopadhyay's portrayal of Sakkhi Gopal, but found the score to be too obtrusive and jarring and felt the cinematography "[failed] to create the right ambience."
