= Yaar Paiyyan =

1957 film by T. R. Raghunath

- Theatrical release poster
- Directed by: T. R. Raghunath
- Screenplay by: Sridhar
- Based on: Chheley Kaar by Sriyuktha Jyothirmaye Roy
- Produced by: N. S. Thiraviam; T. A. Dorairajan
- Starring: Gemini Ganesan; K. Savitri; N. S. Krishnan; T. A. Mathuram; Daisy Irani
- Cinematography: A. Vincent
- Edited by: S. A. Murugesh
- Music by: Susarla Dakshinamurthi
- Production company: Vijaya Films
- Release date: 26 July 1957
- Country: India
- Language: Tamil

Yaar Paiyyan (transl. Whose Son?) is a 1957 Indian Tamil-language children's comedy film directed by T. R. Raghunath and written by Sridhar. A remake of the Bengali film Chheley Kaar (1954), it stars Gemini Ganesan, K. Savitri, N. S. Krishnan, T. A. Mathuram and Daisy Irani. The film revolves around the efforts of a destitute boy to find his parents. Yaar Paiyyan was released on 26 July 1957 and emerged as a box-office success.

== Plot ==
Poori, a young boy, does not know who his parents are, and has been looking relentlessly for them. While sitting on a park bench, Poori asks the man seated beside him his name. When the man introduces himself as Sundararajan, Poori declares that he is his father. This affects Sundararajan's life, even derailing his plans of marrying Latha, his lover. The president of a mental hospital with a mentally-imbalanced daughter creates more trouble for Sundararajan. Ultimately, the truth about Poori's parentage is revealed: he is the illegitimate son of Kumar, a soldier, and the abandoned mother committed suicide, leaving Poori destitute. Attracted to Poori, Sundararajan and Latha decide to adopt him as their own son.

== Cast ==
- Gemini Ganesan as Sundararajan
- K. Savitri as Latha
- N. S. Krishnan as Kandasamy Mudhaliyar
- T. A. Mathuram as Deivayaanai
- Daisy Irani as Poori
- M. K. Mustafa as Kumar
- K. Sarangapani
- T. R. Ramachandran as Sankar
- V. K. Ramasamy as Gopal
- V. Nagayya
- P. S. Gnanam
- Surabhi Balasaraswathi
- Vidyavathi as Rooba, Gopal's wife

== Production ==
Yaar Paiyyan, a remake of the Bengali film Chheley Kaar (1954) written by Sriyuktha Jyothirmaye Roy, was directed by T. R. Raghunath and produced by N. S. Thiraviam and T. A. Dorairajan under Vijaya Films. The screenplay was written by Sridhar, cinematography was handled by A. Vincent, editing by S. A. Murugesh, and art direction was handled by Ganga. The final length of the film was 15,600 feet (4,800 m).

== Soundtrack ==
The music was composed by S. Dakshinamurthi and the lyrics were written by A. Maruthakasi. Dakshinamurthi composed all songs except "Thandhai Yaaro", which was composed by T. Chalapathi Rao.

Song	Singers
"Vaasamigum Malar Cholaiyile"	A. M. Rajah, Jikki
"Thandhai Yaaro Thaayum Yaaro"	P. Susheela
"Palapalapala Jilujilujilu"	S. C. Krishnan, C. Gomathi, Thangappan, Guruvayur Ponnammal
"Kannaamoochi Aattam"	R. Balasaraswathi Devi
"Kanirasame En Kanirasame Adhirasame"	Sirkazhi Govindarajan, Jikki
"Amma Ponne Ramakka, Un Athaan Varaan Paatthuko"	Baby Kasthoori
"Suyanalam Peridhaa Podhunalam Peridhaa"	Ghantasala
"Etthanaiyo Irukkudhu Ingge"	T. V. Rathnam

== Release and reception ==
Yaar Paiyyan was released on 26 July 1957, and emerged a success. Sekar and Sundar jointly reviewed the film for Ananda Vikatan, praising Irani's performance. Kanthan of Kalki appreciated the cast performances, especially Ganesan and Savitri's onscreen chemistry, the sound and lighting, and Sridhar's writing.
