= Chinmoy Roy =

Indian actor

- Born: 16 January 1940; Tipperah, Bengal, British India
- Died: 17 March 2019 (aged 79); Kolkata, West Bengal, India
- Occupation: Actor
- Spouse: Juin Banerjee

Chinmoy Roy (16 January 1940 – 17 March 2019) was an Indian Bengali actor. He was famous for his comic roles in Bengali movies, though his versatility allowed him to play a variety of roles.

Though he was known for portraying various character roles, Roy was equally at ease playing the famous fictional character Tenida on screen. He held his own among prominent performers like Soumitra Chatterjee, Robi Ghose and Tarun Kumar in the comedies Basanto Bilap, Dhonni Meye, and Nanigopaler Biye. He was also seen in a small role in Satyajit Ray's Goopy Gyne o Bagha Byne, portraying a spy working for the Minister of Halla. Despite contending with chronic health problems, he continued working on a script for a film called Sudama- The Half Man, directed by Indo-Australian director Rajib Ball. Roy also planned on working on a few more scripts with the same director.

== Death ==
Roy died at the age of 79 in Kolkata on 17 March 2019 at about 10:10 p.m., from a heart attack.

== Filmography ==
Year	Film	Director	Co-Star	Remarks
1966	Galpo Holeo Satti	Tapan Sinha	Rabi Ghosh, Bhanu Banerjee, Chaya Devi	His first film with Tapan Sinha
1967	Hatey Bazarey	Tapan Sinha	Ashok Kumar, Vyjayanthimala, Ajitesh Bandopadhyay, Bhanu Bandyopadhyay	
1967	Chiriyakhana	Satyajit Ray	Uttam Kumar	His first film with Satyajit Ray
1968	Goopy Gyne Bagha Byne	Satyajit Ray	Tapen Chatterjee, Rabi Ghosh, Santosh Dutta, Harindranath Chattopadhyay, Jahor Roy, Santi Chatterjee	
1969	Teen Bhubaner Pare	Ashutosh Bandyopadhyay	Soumitra Chatterjee, Tanuja, Rabi Ghosh	
1970	Rupasi	Ajit Ganguly		
1970	Sagina Mahato	Tapan Sinha	Dilip Kumar, Saira Banu	
1971	Attatar Din Pare	Ajit Lahiri		
1971	Pratibad	Tapeshwar Prasad		
1971	Janani	Ajit Ganguly		
1971	Ekhoni	Tapan Sinha	Swarup Dutta, Aparna Sen, Moushumi Chatterjee, Mrinal Mukherjee	Won the BFJA Award for Best Actor in a Supporting Role
1971	Dhanyee Meye	Aravind Mukherjee		
1972	Ajker Nayak	Dinen Gupta		
1972	Natun Diner Alo	Ajit Ganguly		
1972	Picnic	Inder Sen		
1972	Jaban (film)	Palash Bannerjee		
1973	Aandhar Periye	Tapan Sinha		
1973	Nanigopaler Biye	Sudhir Mukherjee		
1973	Basanta Bilap	Dinen Gupta		
1973	Shriman Prithviraj	Tarun Majumdar		
1973	Shravan Sandhya	Bireswar Bose		
1974	Pranta Rekha	Dinen Gupta		
1974	Mouchak	Aravind Mukherjee		
1974	Sharmila	Sunil Ghosh		
1974	Sangini	Dinen Gupta		
1974	Thagini	Tarun Majumdar		
1974	Sadhu Judhishthirer Karcha	Rabi Ghosh		
1974	Phuleshwari	Tarun Majumdar		
1974	Phulu Thakurma	Sadhan Sarkar		
1974	Premer Phande	Chitradoot		
1974	Chhutir Phande	Salil Sen		
1975	Amriter Swad	Parimal Bhattacharya		
1975	Sudur Niharika	Sushil Mukherjee		
1975	Rag Anurag	Dinen Gupta		
1975	Swayamsiddha	Sushil Mukherjee		
1975	Arjun	Inder Sen		
1975	Mohanbaganer Meye	Manu Sen		
1976	Nidhi Ram Sardar	Rabi Ghosh		
1976	Ananda Mela	Mangal Chakraborty		
1976	Dui Bon	Sachin Adhikari		
1976	Asamoy	Inder Sen		
1976	Dampati	Anil Ghosh		
1976	Chander Kachhakachhi	Dilip Mukherji		
1977	Ek Bindu Sukh	Ajit Lahiri		
1977	Praner Thakur Ramkrishna	Niranjan Dey		
1977	Harano Prapti Niruddesh	Swadesh Sarkar		
1978	Jatayu	Uttarsuri		
1978	Charmurti	Umanath Bhattacharya		Tenida film
1978	Ranger Saheb	Ramprasad Chakraborty		
1978	Striker (1978 film)	Archan Chakraborty		
1979	Ghatkali	Bimal Roy Jr.		
1979	Shubho Sangbad	Jagannath Chatterjee		
1979	Chameli Memsaheb	Inder Sen		
1979	Brajabuli	Pijush Bose		
1979	Heere Manik	Salil Dutta		
1979	Samadhan	Jayanta Basu		
1980	Pankhiraj	Pijush Bose		
1980	Abhi	Apurba Kumar Mitra		
1980	Gharer Baire Ghar	Salil Dutta		
1980	Barabhai	Sushil Mukherjee		
1980	Kalo Chokher Tara	Palash Bannerjee		
1980	Priyatama	Dinen Gupta		
1980	Sandhi	Amal Dutta		
1980	Byapika Biday	Archan Chakraborty		
1980	Ei To Sansar	Kanak Mukherjee		
1981	Pahari Phul	Sridip Ghosh		
1981	Subarna Golak	Manu Sen		
1981	Sei Sur	Niranjan Dey		
1981	Ogo Bodhu Sundari	Salil Dutta		
1982	Amrita Kumbher Sandhaney	Dilip Ray		
1982	Preyasi	Shrikanta Guha-Thakurta		
1982	Pratiksha	Bimal Ray Jr.		
1982	Maa Bhabani Maa Aamar	Sadhan Choudhury		
1983	Ei Chhilo Mone	Subir Sarkar		
1983	Kauke Bolo Na	Vishwanath Mukherjee		
1983	Duti Pata	Bimal Roy Jr.		
1983	Aparupa	Bidesh Sarkar		
1983	Jini Ram Tini Krishna Ek Dehe Ram Krishna	Niranjan Dey		
1983	Abhinoy Noy	Archan Chakraborty		
1984	Sorgol	Biswajit		
1984	Amar Geeti	Tarun Majumdar		
1984	Joy Parajoy	Chandan Mukherjee		
1985	Didi	Swadesh Sarkar		
1985	Sonar Sansar	Rathish Dey Sarkar		
1985	Tagari	Ajit Ganguly		
1985	Aloy Phera	Ajit Ganguly		
1986	Shapmukti	Ajit Ganguly		
1986	Prem Bandhan	Rathish Dey Sarkar		
1986	Achena Mukh	Ajit Lahiri		
1986	Urbashe	Salil Dutta		
1986	Shyam Saheb	Salil Dutta		
1987	Anurodh	Jayanta Bhattacharya		
1987	Nyay Adhikar	Anjan Mukherjee		
1987	Samrat-O-Sundari	Bimal Roy Jr.		
1987	Jar Je Priyo	Salil Dutta		
1988	Agaman	Tarun Majumdar		
1988	Madhuban	Ajay Kar		
1988	Kidnap	Abir Basu		
1988	Punarmilan	Jayanta Basu		
1988	Aparadhi	Nandan Dasgupta		
1988	Prati Paksha	Rathish Dey Sarkar		
1988	Antaranga	Dinen Gupta		
1988	Ora Charjan	Shamit Bhanja		
1989	Aamar Shapath	Prabhat Roy		
1989	Jhankar	Sujit Guha		
1991	Abhagini	Bablu Samaddar		
1991	Aamar Sathi	Salil Dutta		
1991	Kagajer Nouka	Sekhar Sarkar		
1991	Sadharan Meye	Shamit Bhanja		
1991	Sindur	Anandam		
1992	Mayabini	Tushar Majumdar		
1993	Tapasya	Rajat Das		
1993	Duranta Prem	Prabhat Roy		
1993	Mon Manena	Inder Sen		
1994	Lal Pan Bibi	Prashanta Nanda		
1994	Tumi Je Aamar	Inder Sen		
1994	Rakta Nadir Dhara	Ram Mukhopadhyay		
1995	Naginkanya	Swapan Saha		
1995	Drishti	Taba Mullik		
1996	Banaphul	Shamit Bhanja		
1996	Nikhonj	Dipen Pal		
1996	Biyer Phool	Ram Mukhopadhyay		
1996	Jamaibabu	Dulal Bhowmick		
1997	Pratirodh	Srinivas Chakraborty		
1997	Bhalobasa	Shamit Bhanja		
1997	Jiban Jouban	Dulal Bhowmick		
1997	Gane Bhuban Bhariye Debo	Putul Guha		
1997	Lofar	Bablu Samaddar		
1998	Surya Kanya	Biresh Chattopadhyay		
1998	Jamai No. 1	Nitish Ray		
2011	Tenida (film)	Himself		
