= Avayer Biye =

- Directed by: Sushil Majumdar
- Written by: Naresh Chandra Sengupta (Story)
- Screenplay by: Sushil Majumdar
- Starring: Chhaya Devi; Ahindra Choudhury; Dhiraj Bhattacharya; Kanu Banerjee; Chhabi Biswas
- Edited by: Santosh Gangopadhyay
- Music by: S. D. Burman; Robin Chatterjee
- Production company: Deluxe Pictures
- Release date: April 3, 1942 (India)
- Country: India
- Language: Bengali

Avayer Biye is an Indian Bengali language drama film directed by Sushil Majumdar based on the story of novelist Naresh Chandra Sengupta. This film was released on 3 April 1942 under the banner of Deluxe Pictures. The music director of the movie were S. D. Burman and Robin Chatterjee.

== Plot ==
The film is a social drama revolving around the marital arrangements of Abhoy.

== Cast ==
- Chhabi Biswas
- Chhaya Devi
- Ahindra Choudhury
- Dhiraj Bhattacharya
- Nripati Chattopadhyay
- Kanu Banerjee
- Rekha Mitra
- Prabhat Chattopadhyay
- Maya Bose
- Tara Bhaduri

== Remake ==
The story was remade again in 1957 in the same name by the direction of Sukumar Dasgupta. The 1957 version starred Uttam Kumar and Sabitri Chatterjee in the lead roles.
