= Jaban (film) =

1972 Bengali film by Palash Banerjee

Jaban (transl. Tongue) is a 1972 Bengali romantic drama film directed by Palash Banerjee. The film stars Amitabh Bacchan, Dharmendra, Biswajit and Shatrughan Sinha.

== Plot ==
Binu and Laxmi love each other. They want to marry but Laxmi's uncle sells her to Janardan, who sends her to a brothel. Binu is framed for theft and sent to prison.

== Cast ==
- Samit Bhanja as Binu
- Radha Saluja as Laxmi
- Amitabh Bachchan (Guest appearance)
- Dharmendra (Guest appearance)
- Shatrughan Sinha (Guest appearance)
- Biswajit Chatterjee (Guest appearance)
- Ajitesh Bandopadhyay
- Shambhu Bhattacharya
- Kajal Gupta
- Chinmoy Roy
- Anubha Gupta
- Dilip Roy

== Soundtrack ==
No.	Title	Lyrics	Music	Singer	Length
1.	"Jodi Prem Kori Tumi Ami"	Pulak Bandyopadhyay	Sudhin Dasgupta	Manna Dey	3:11
2.	"Ei Pathe Pashapashi"	Pulak Bandyopadhyay	Sudhin Dasgupta	Krishna Bhanja, Manna Dey	3:24
3.	"Dil Jadi Hoy Diwana"	Pulak Bandyopadhyay	Sudhin Dasgupta	Arati Mukherjee	3:05
4.	"Raja Nachbe Rani Nachbe"	Sudhin Dasgupta	Sudhin Dasgupta	Manna Dey	3:03
