= Mantra Shakti =

1954 Indian Bengali film

- মন্ত্র শক্তি
- Directed by: Chitta Basu
- Starring: Uttam Kumar; Anubha Gupta; Asit Baran; Bhanu Banerjee
- Release date: 1954
- Country: India
- Language: Bengali

Mantra Shakti (The Power of Chantis) is an Indian Bengali drama film directed by Chitta Basu and produced by Harendranath Chattopadhyay. It was released in 1954 under the banner of H. N. C. Productions.

== Cast ==
- Uttam Kumar
- Anubha Gupta
- Asit Baran
- Bhanu Banerjee
- Ahindra Choudhury
- Molina Devi
- Manju Dey
- Jahar Ganguly
- Sandhyarani
- Kanu Banerjee
- Preeti Majumdar
- Ranibala
- Robi Roy
