= Mouchaak =

Indian Bengali web series

- Release poster
- Genre: Comedy
- Directed by: Sayantan Ghosal
- Country of origin: India
- Original language: Bengali
- No. of seasons: 1
- No. of episodes: 7

Production
- Production company: Missing Screw

Original release
- Release: 18 June 2021

Mouchaak (Bengali: মৌচাক) is a Bengali web series on OTT platform Hoichoi. It is a dark humour series directed by Sayantan Ghosal and produced by Missing Screw Productions. The cast includes Monami Ghosh, making her web series debut as Mou Boudi, Kanchan Mallick, Sourav Chatterjee, Ujan Chatterjee, Suhotra Mukhopadhyay, Debapriyo Mukherjee, Apratim Chatterjee, and Jammy Banerjee.

== Plot ==
Mouchaak presents a fateful night filled with accidental deaths, a lottery ticket worth 1.5 crores rupees, and a few strange characters. The lottery ticket is the only way Mou Boudi could live her life on her own terms.

== Cast ==
- Monami Ghosh as Mou
- Kanchan Mullick as Tarak
- Debopriyou Mukherjee as Toton
- Jammy Banerjee as Naren
- Sourav Chatterjee as Bimal
- Apratim Chatterjee as Poltu
- Soumyadeep Banerjee as Naren
- Suhotra Mukhopadhyay as Laltu

== Season 1 (2021) ==
On June 8, 2021, Hoichoi released the official trailer. On June 18, 2021, Hoichoi released the first season with seven episodes.

== Episodes ==
No.	Title	Directed by	Original release date
1	"Moumachhi Nachanachi"	Sayantan Ghosal	18 June 2021
2	"Maar Dala Re!"	Sayantan Ghosal	18 June 2021
3	"Mou Mou Bhou Bhou"	Sayantan Ghosal	18 June 2021
4	"Joljyanto Joley"	Sayantan Ghosal	18 June 2021
5	"Looth Liya Lottery"	Sayantan Ghosal	18 June 2021
6	"Bhaagte Raho!"	Sayantan Ghosal	18 June 2021
7	"Kanamachhi Bho Bho"	Sayantan Ghosal	18 June 2021
