= Chheley Kaar =

1954 film by Chitta Basu

- Bengali: ছেলে কার!
- Directed by: Chitta Basu
- Screenplay by: Jyotirmoy Roy
- Story by: Jyotirmoy Roy
- Edited by: Kamal Ganguly
- Music by: Kalipada Sen
- Distributed by: Chhaya Bani Limited
- Release date: 1953
- Country: India
- Language: Bengali

Chheley Kaar (transl. Whose Child?) is a 1954 Indian Bengali-language children's comedy film directed by Chitta Basu and produced by Charan Chitra. This film received President's Silver Medal in National Film Award for Best Feature Film in Bengali in 1954. It was remade in Hindi as Bandish, starring Ashok Kumar and Meena Kumari, in Tamil as Yaar Paiyyan, and in Malayalam as Bhagyamudra.

== Plot ==
Tomato is an orphan who lives with his adoptive father, who is suffering from a virulent disease, and would die within a few months. He instructs Tomato to take shelter with a rich person, Kunal Sen. Tomato approaches Kunal in a park and refers to him as father. Shocked, Kunal tries to escape from the unknown child, but cannot. After many obstacles and chaos, Kunal and his girlfriend Mili start loving Tomato.

== Cast ==
- Bikash Roy as Kunal Sen
- Bhanu Banerjee as Monty
- Chhabi Biswas as Kunal's father
- Arundhati Devi as Mili
- Nabadwip Haldar as Guard at Children's Home
- Jahor Roy as Robin
- Suprava Mukherjee as Kunal's mother
- Jiben Bose as Kunal's Friend
- Master Tilak as Tomato
- Asha Devi as Pishima
- Sadhna Roy Choudhury as Superintendent of children's home
