= Jayanta-Manik =

Fictional detective characters created by Hemendra Kumar Roy

Jayanta and Manik are the fictional detective characters created by Indian Bengali novelist Hemendra Kumar Roy. Roy wrote a number of stories of Jayanta-Manik which are considered as one of the most popular children's literature in Bengal.

== Character ==
Jayanta and his friend cum assistant Manik alias Maniklal are amateur detectives who live in Kolkata. They solve mysteries privately and help the police track down real culprits. Both are patriotic, courageous and intelligent. Police inspector Sundar Babu very often takes help of the detective duo. Sundar Babu is a bit comical and a foodie. Jayanta follows the latest science techniques like hypnotism, fingerprint theory to solve the cases. Jayanta likes playing the flute and taking snuff in his offtime.

== Stories ==
- Manush Pisach
- Shani Mongoler Rahasya
- Sonar Anaras
- Nabajuger Mahadanob
- Moron Khelar Kheloar
- Nrimunda Shikari
- Sajahaner Mayur
- Mrityu Mollar
- Jayanter Kirti
- Chatrapatir Chora
- Ratanpurer Jatri
- Firoza Mukut Rahasya
- Kapaliker Kobole
- Bojrovoirober Mantra
- Pravat Roktomakha
- Venus Chorar Rahasya
- Anubiser Avishap
- Hatya Ebong Tarpor
- Hatya Hahakare
- Hatyakari Hatyakahini
- Jogotsether Rotnokuthi
- Padmarag Buddha
- Nitanto Halka Mamla
- Ek Khana Ulte Pora Chair
- Amar Goendagiri
- Netajir Choy Murti
- Kacher Coffin
- Ekratti Mati
- Ekpati Juto
- Khanikta Tamar Taar
- Aloukik
- Jayanter Adventure
