= Hemendra Kumar Roy =

Indian writer (1888-1963)

- Born: 2 September 1888; Calcutta, Bengal Presidency, British India
- Died: 18 April 1963 (aged 74); Calcutta, West Bengal, India
- Occupation: Writer

Hemendra Kumar Roy (2 September 1888 – 18 April 1963) was an Indian Bengali writer noted for his contribution to the early development of the genre of children's literature in the language. He was a noted contributor to the early development of Bengali detective fiction with his 'Jayanta-Manik' and adventurist 'Bimal-Kumar' stories, dealing with the exploits of Jayanta, his assistant Manik, and police inspector Sunderbabu. Roy also translated the Rubaiyat of Omar Khayyám into Bengali. Roy's 'Ajab Deshe Amala' is a well-known translation of Alice in Wonderland.

== Early life ==
Son of Radhikaprasad Roy, Hemendrakumar was born in Kolkata in 1888, in an affluent family originally hailing from Pathuriaghata. Roy inherited a part of his artistic talent from his father who was a more than competent player of the Esraj (a string instrument) and regularly gave performances at the famed Star Theatre in North Kolkata. His first published work was a short-story Amar Kahini that appeared in the magazine Basudha in 1903. In 1916, he joined the circle of writers that published in the Bharati journal edited by Sourindramohan Mukherjee and Manilal Ganguly. He also composed a number of horror stories for children.

== Creative years ==
In 1925, Hemendrakumar Ray became the editor of Nachghar. Apart from this magazine, he helped edit other literary magazines including Rongmoshal. During the next few decades, Hemendrakumar Ray wrote over 80 books for children. He was monumental in contributing a body of detective, horror, and science-fiction work that would form a substantial portion of the early literature for children in Bengali. In 1930, he wrote his first detective story which was published in Mouchak. He is best remembered as the creator of Bimal-Kumar, the adventurer duo and Jayanta-Manik the detective duo. It was Bimal-Kumar's adventure story Jokher Dhan, for which he is famous in Bengali literature for children. He was a staunch believer in supernaturals (according to Khagendranath Mitra in his Introduction to Hemendra Kumar Roy Rachanabali, Volume 1) and he used the supernatural element in several of his adventure and mystery stories. One of the recurring characters in his stories and novels featuring Jayanta-Manik was Inspector Sunderbabu, a chubby and somewhat-cowardly police officer with an insatiable appetite who was also a good friend to the detectives. In Ratrir Jatri, Roy introduced a new detective character named, Hemanta Choudhury and his friend-associate Robin. Apart from literary productions for children, Roy also wrote numerous essays, short stories, and novels for adults. He adapted some foreign author's stories in Bengali.He was also a painter and the choreographer for Shishirkumar Bhaduri's Seeta. He also wrote a volume of lyrics Jaubaner Gaan (that is, 'The Song of Youth'). Several of these lyrics were put to music and sung by Bengali legends like Sachin Dev Burman, Kanai Dey, and Manna Dey. Kazi Nazrul Islam composed music for the lyrics of Hemendra Kumar.One of his short stories, Sindur Chupri, was translated into German and was included in a collection of short stories. He created a comic series titled Tara Teen Bondhu, which consists of seven short stories such as 'Kukur Kahini', 'Nakuler Daon Mara', 'Maharaja Chor Churamoni Bahadur', 'Kamon Kore Totlami Sare', 'Kartik Pujor Bhoot', 'Der Dozon Jahagi', and 'Madhureno Somapoyet'. The three main character of this series - Atal, Patol and Nakul - won huge popularity among the children and youngsters. One of his stories, 'Dersho Khokar Kando' (that is, 'The Deeds of 150 Boys') was made into a film, while several of his works, namely Abar Jokher Dhon and Ratrir Jatri, have been adapted for television. His story Nishithini Bibhisikha was adapted for Bengali movie named Jighansha(1951). The superhit Hindi film Bees Saal Baad was based on the story of Nishithini Bibhisikha. In 1939 a movie named Jakher Dhan based on Hemendrakumar's novel in the same name was made by director Haricharan Bhanja. This film starred Chhaya Devi, Ahindra Choudhury, Jahar Ganguly. This was one of the most popular thriller of Bengali literature. A television serial in the same name was also telecast. over the story in the 1990s. Another Bengali movie in the named Jawker Dhan was released in August, 2017 directed by Sayantan Ghoshal.

Pinaki Roy, who has offered post-colonial interpretations of Bengali detective fiction, gives primacy to Roy more as a writer of sleuth narratives than of children's literature. Pinaki Roy credits the litterateur for initiating a trend which would ultimately bring the Bengali detective-story-writing from its colonial phase to its anti-imperialistic one: "Jayanta, the detective-cum-scientist, is probably one of the earlier fictional Indian sleuths who use their Indian sensibilities to capture Indian criminals operating in what could be identified as an 'indigenous' atmosphere. That Roy would adapt Bram Stoker's Dracula into Bishalgarer Dushshashan, Arthur Conan Doyle's The Hound of the Baskervilles into Nishachari Bibhishika and Agatha Christie's Ten Little Niggers into Haradhaner Deep attest to his conscious following of Western sleuth writings in order to make something Indian - and therefore post-colonial - out of them".

== Selected bibliography ==
- Bhorer Purabi
- Beno Jal
- Malachandan
- Meghduter Morte Agomon
- Moynamotir Mayakanan
- Nil Sayorer Ochinpure
- Amabashyar Raat
- Andhakarer Bandhu
- Jader Dekhechi
- Ekhon Jaader Dekhchi
- Jokher Dhan
- Abar Jokher Dhan
- Bangla Rongaloy o Shishirkumar
- Omar Khayyam-er Rubaiyat
- Jayanter Kirti
- Padmarag Buddha
- Sonar Anarash
- Manush Pishach
- Sab Charitra Kalpanik Nai
- Hemendra Kumar Roy Rachanabali, Vol 1-32

== In popular culture ==
- Jakher Dhan (1939)
- Jighansa (1951)
- Jawker Dhan (2017)
- Sagardwipey Jawker Dhan (2019)
- Bandorer Paa (2025)
