= Indira (1983 film) =

- ইন্দিরা
- Directed by: Dinen Gupta
- Written by: Indira by Bankim Chandra Chatterjee
- Screenplay by: Dinen Gupta
- Starring: Aparna Sen; Soumitra Chatterjee; Anup Kumar; Basanta Choudhury; Utpal Dutt
- Cinematography: Dinen Gupta
- Edited by: Pranab Ghosh
- Music by: Manabendra Mukhopadhyay
- Distributed by: Sree Ranjit Pictures
- Release date: 7 October 1983
- Country: India
- Language: Bengali

Indira is Bengali drama film directed by Dinen Gupta based on the same name novel of Bankim Chandra Chatterjee. This film was released on 7 October 1983 under the banner of Sanchayita Films. The music for the film was composed by Manabendra Mukhopadhyay.

== Cast ==
- Aparna Sen as Indira
- Soumitra Chatterjee
- Anup Kumar
- Sumitra Mukherjee
- Basanta Choudhury
- Utpal Dutt
- Kajal Gupta
- Rabi Ghosh
- Sobha Sen
- Kali Banerjee
- Gita Dey
