= Swastik Sanket =

2022 Indian Bengali adventure thriller film

- Directed by: Sayantan Ghosal
- Screenplay by: Sougata Basu
- Based on: Narak Sanket by Debarati Mukhopadhyay
- Produced by: Ashok Dhanuka
- Starring: Nusrat Jahan; Gaurav Chakrabarty; Rudranil Ghosh; Saswata Chatterjee
- Cinematography: Tuban
- Edited by: Subhajit Singha
- Music by: Raja Narayan Deb
- Production company: Eskay Movies
- Distributed by: Eskay Movies
- Release date: 21 January 2022
- Running time: 138 minutes
- Country: India
- Language: Bengali

Swastik Sanket is a Bengali-language adventure thriller film directed by Sayantan Ghosal based on Narak Sanket, novel of Debarati Mukhopadhyay. The film was produced by Talkies Productions and released on 21 January 2022 under the banner of Eskay Movies.

== Plot ==
Rudrani is invited to London by her publisher to inaugurate the international edition of her book on cryptography. She meets an elusive man Shumaker, who requests her to decrypt puzzles left behind by her grandfather-clues that can lead to a cure for Cancer. While Rudrani, along with her engineer husband Priyam takes on the challenge, what she doesn't realise is that she getting sucked into a pool of dangerous international conspiracy.

In a race against time Rudrani & Priyam must uncover the clues to the antidote of dreaded virus that challenges the very existence of mankind.

== Cast ==
- Nusrat Jahan as Rudrani
- Gaurav Chakrabarty as Priyam
- Saswata Chatterjee as Subhas Chandra Bose
- Shataf Figar as Dr. Shumaker
- Rudranil Ghosh as Subhas Chatterjee
- Selina Youngerman as Eva Brown
- Jamie Langlands as Felix
- Michael Lipman as Joachim Von Ribbentrop
- Mick Liversidge as Professor Rudolph
- Raj Sengupta as Jimmy
- Birendra Roy as Robironjon Sen
- Jamie Humphrey as Richard
- Daniel Taylor as Adolf Hitler

== Soundtrack ==
Track listing
No.	Title	Singer(s)	Length
1.	"Ki Khobor"	Dev Arijit & Somlata Acharyya Chowdhury	3:55
Total length:			3:55
