= Nirbandhamer Jora Khun =

2020 Bengali film

- Directed by: Sayantan Ghosal
- Screenplay by: Santanu Mukherjee; Sanjib Banerji
- Story by: Sanjib Banerji
- Produced by: Tanmoy Banerjee; Shyam Sundar Dey
- Starring: Archishman Biswas; Souman Bose; Tanushree Chakraborty; Falaque Rashid Roy
- Edited by: Subhajit Singha
- Release date: 25 October 2020
- Country: India

Nirbandhamer Jora Khun (Double Murder in Nirbandham) is a Bengali mystery thriller film directed by Sayantan Ghosal. The film was released on 25 October 2020 under the banner of Zee Telefilms.

== Plot ==
The plot revolves around a mysterious double murder case in a house named Nirbandham. Actress Riyanka's husband and her father in law were killed there. Lady police officer Shibani investigates the case.

== Cast ==
- Tanushree Chakraborty as Shibani Gupta
- Falaque Rashid Roy as Riyanka
- Indrasish Roy as Sajib Sen
- Joy Badlani as Bajoria
- Souman Bose as Inspector Ajit Roy
