= Bindur Chhele (1952 film) =

1952 Indian film

- Directed by: Chitta Bose
- Screenplay by: Naresh Mitra
- Story by: Sarat Chandra Chattopadhyay
- Based on: Bindur Chhele by Sarat Chandra Chattopadhyay
- Starring: Sandhyarani; Pahari Sanyal; Bhanu Bandyopadhyay; Molina Devi
- Cinematography: Ramananda Sengupta
- Edited by: Rabin Das
- Music by: Kalipada Sen
- Distributed by: Kalpana Movies Limited
- Release date: 19 September 1952
- Country: India
- Language: Bengali

Bindur Chhele is a Bengali drama film directed by Chitta Bose based on the famous 1913 Bengali novel of the same name by Sarat Chandra Chattopadhyay. The film was released on 19 September 1952 under the banner of Jugantar Chhaya Pratisthan. Featuring cinematography by Ramananda Sengupta, it is considered a landmark film in Indian cinema.

== Cast ==
- Sandhyarani as Bindubasini
- Pahari Sanyal as Jadab
- Ajit Bandyopadhyay as Madhab
- Kanu Banerjee as Priyababu
- Bhanu Bandyopadhyay
- Molina Devi as Annapurna
- Master Bibhu Bhattacharya as Amulya
- Master Sukhen Das as Narendranath
- Renuka Ray as Elokeshi
- Manoranjan Bhattacharya
- Reba Devi
