= Bimal-Kumar =

Fictional characters by Bengali novelist Hemendra Kumar Roy

Bimal-Kumar are fictional characters created by Bengali novelist Hemendra Kumar Roy. These are popular figures of Bengali Children's literature. Roy wrote almost thirty Bimal-Kumar stories and novel. Some of them are science fiction.

== Characters ==
They are two Bengali friends named Bimal and Kumar. Both are adventurous, daredevil and intelligent. The duos like to solve mysteries, roam all over the world, search hidden treasure and live a fearless life. They are bachelors. Their old, loyal servant Ramhari and pet dog Bagha accompany them. Ramhari acts as their guardian. Binoy babu, a man with versatile knowledge and a school boy Kamal sometimes joins their adventure and "Binoy babu"'s daughter " Mrinu" also joins their adventure and "Mr.philip" joins their adventure for one time .

== Stories ==
- Jawker Dhan
- Abar Jawker Dhan
- Meghduter Martye Agamon
- Maynamatir Mayakanon
- Amabasyar Raat
- Jerinar Konthohar
- Dragoner Duswapno
- Amrita Dwip
- Sonar Pahere Jatri
- Nil Sayorer Achinpure
- Sundorboner Roktopagol
- Kumarer Bagha Goyenda
- Himaloyer Voyonkor
- Surjyanagarir Guptadhan
- Prashanter Agnyeodwip
- Jokkhopotir Rotnopuri
- Kuber Purir Rahasyo
- Sulu Sagorer Vuture Desh
- Asomvaber Deshe
- Kumar Bimoler Rahasyo Adventure
- Adrishyer Kirti
- Pishach
- Daliar Apomrityu
- Agadh Joler Rui Katla
- Baba Mustafar Dari
- Boner Bhetore Notun Voy
- Guhabasi Bivisan
- Je Churi Kotha koy
- Mandhatar Mulluke

== Film adaptation ==
Jakher Dhan (Treasure of the Sacred Spirit), the first and most popular story of Bimal and Kumar, was filmed by director Haricharan Bhanja in 1939. This movie starred Chhaya Devi, Ahindra Choudhury and Jahar Ganguly. Another Bimal-Kumar story Abar Jakher Dhan was telecast as a television serial in the 1990s. A Bengali movie, Jawker Dhan, was released in August, 2017, directed by Sayantan Ghosal. The roles of Bimal and Kumar were played by Parambrata Chatterjee and Rahul Banerjee, respectively. In 2019, the sequel to Jawker Dhan was released titled Sagardwipey Jawker Dhan.
