= Ahindra Choudhury =

Bengali actor

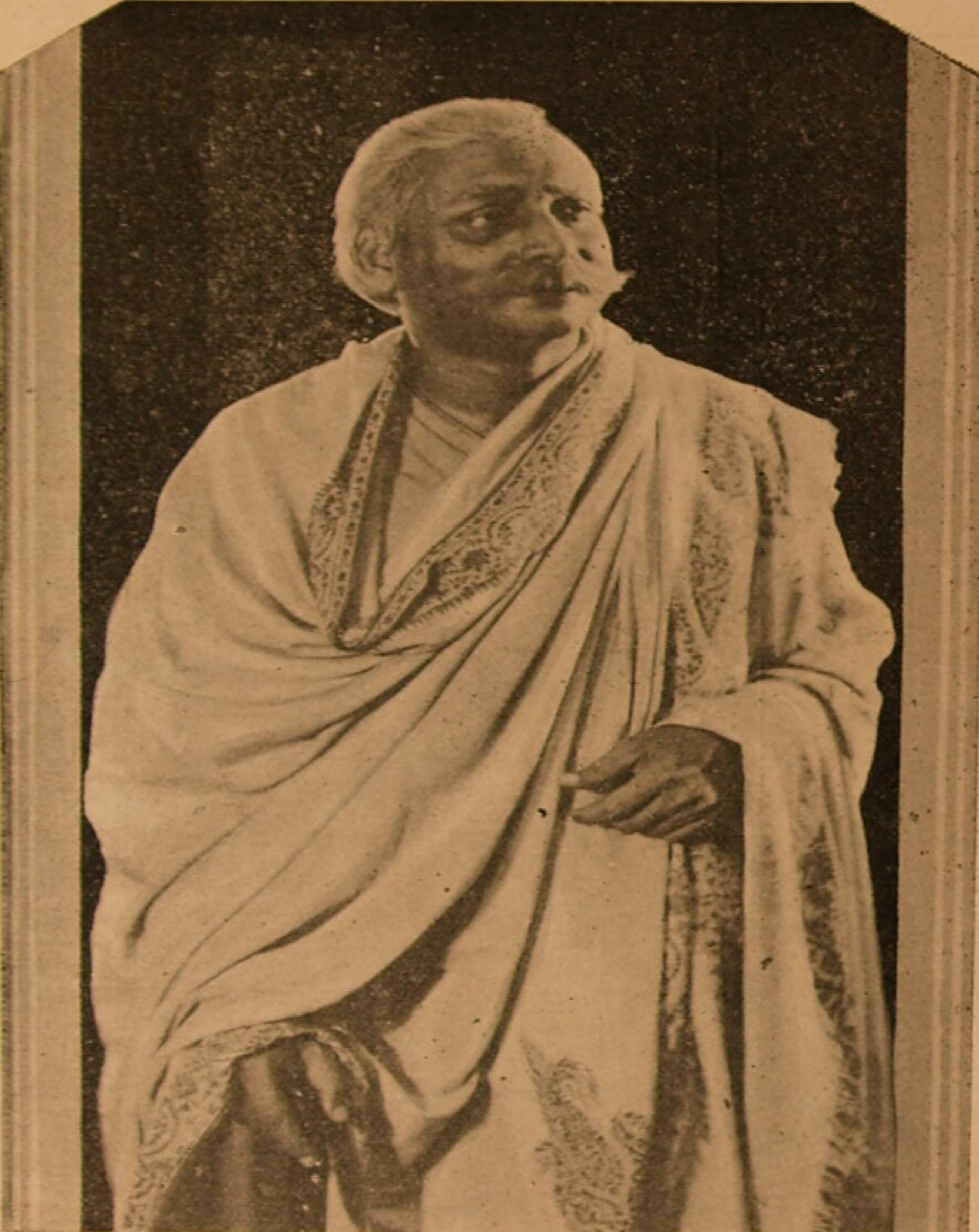
- Born: 6 August 1896; Chakraberia, Kolkata, Bengal Presidency, India
- Died: 5 November 1974 (aged 78); Kolkata West Bengal, India
- Occupations: Actor, theatre personality
- Years active: 1921 - 1974
- Title: Natasurya
- Awards: Padma Shri; Sangeet Natak Akademi Award

Ahindra Choudhury (1896–1974) was an Indian actor, director, theatre personality and the co-founder of Photo Play Syndicate, a Kolkata-based art organization for bioscope shows. A winner of the Sangeet Natak Akademi Award in 1958, Choudhury was honoured by the Government of India in 1963 with the award of Padma Shri, the fourth highest Indian civilian award, for his services to the nation.

== Biography ==
Ahindra Choudhury was born on 6 August 1896 in Chakraberia, Kolkata in the Indian state of West Bengal. His early education was at Sishu Vidyalaya in Chakraberia and at London Missionary, Kolkata from where he completed his studies in 1911. His entry into films started with the bioscope show company, Photo Play Synidicate, he founded together with Prafulla Ghosh in 1921. Two years later, he wrote the screenplay for the motionless feature film, Soul of a Slave directed by Hemchandra Mukherjee and was the lead actor.

His foray into the movie world was in 1931 with Hrishir Prem, a Jyotish Bandopadhay film. He retired from acting with Shahjahan, a drama staged on 11 September 1957 at Minerva Theatre, Kolkata. Years later, he appeared in one more film, Shravan Sandhya, in 1974. He acted in 89 films, wrote screenplay for his maiden venture, Soul of a Slave and directed two films.

Choudhury received the Sangeet Natak Akademi award in 1958. The Government of India honoured him with the civilian award of Padma Shri in 1963. He was a recipient of DLitt (Honoris Causa) from the Rabindra Bharati University and was a guest Lecturer at the University of Kolkata. He died on 4 November 1974, at the age of 80.

== Filmography ==
=== As an actor ===
#	Year	Title	Director
1	1923	Soul of a Slave	Hemchandra Mukherjee
2	1924	Mishar Rani	Jyotish Bannerjee
3	1924	Premanjali	Jyotish Bannerjee
4	1927	Durgesh Nandini	Priyanath N. Ganguly
5	1928	Shasti Ki Shanti	Jyotish Bannerjee
6	1930	Rajsingha	Jyotish Bannerjee
7	1931	Rishir Prem	Jyotish Bannerjee
8	1932	Vishnumaya	Jyotish Bannerjee
9	1932	Krishnakanter Will	Jyotish Bannerjee
10	1932	Prahlad (Hindi)	Kanjibhai Rathod
11	1933	Seeta	Sisir Kumar Bhaduri
12	1934	Chand Saudagar	Prafulla Roy
13	1934	Mahua	Hiren Bose
14	1934	Roop Lekha	P. C. Barua
15	1934	Dakshayajna	Jyotish Bannerjee
16	1935	Bidrohi	Dhirendranath Ganguly
17	1935	Balidan (Hindi)	Prafulla Roy
18	1936	Dalit Kusum (Hindi)	M. L. Tandon
19	1936	Sonar Sansar	Debaki Bose
20	1936	Sarala	Premankur Atorthy
21	1936	Rajani	Jyotish Bannerjee
22	1936	Krishna Sudama	Phani Burma
23	1937	Prabas Milan	Phani Burma
24	1937	Talkie of Talkies	Sisir Kumar Bhaduri
25	1937	Indira (1937 film)	Tarit Bose
26	1937	Samaj Patan (Hindi)	Prafulla Roy
27	1938	Devi Phullara	Tincory Chakrabarty
28	1938	Abhinaya	Modhu Bose
29	1939	Jakher Dhan	Haricharan Bhanja
30	1939	Bamanabatar	Haricharan Bhanja
31	1939	Rikta	Sushil Majumdar
32	1939	Nara Narayana	Jyotish Bannerjee
33	1939	Janak Nandini	Phani Burma
34	1939	Chanakya	Sisir Kumar Bhaduri
35	1940	Doctor	Phani Majumdar, Subodh Mitra
36	1940	Suktara	Niranjan Pal
37	1940	Kamale Kamini	Phani Burma, Nirmal Goswami
38	1941	Avatar	Premankur Atorthy
39	1941	Uttarayan	P. C. Barua
40	1941	Nandini	Sailajanand Mukherji
41	1941	Karnarjun	Jyotish Bannerjee, Satish Dasgupta
42	1941	Epar Opar	Chitta Bose, Sukumar Dasgupta
43	1941	Doctor (Hindi)	Subhod Mittes
44	1942	Jiban Sangini	Gunamoy Bannerjee
45	1942	Meenakshi	Modhu Bose
46	1942	Jawab	P.C. Barua
47	1942	Avayer Biye	Sushil Majumdar
48	1943	Jogajog	Sushil Majumdar
49	1943	Dwanda	Hemen Gupta
50	1943	Devar	Jyotish Bannerjee
51	1944	Matir Ghar	Haricharan Bhanja
52	1944	Nandita	Sukumar Dasgupta
53	1944	Sandhi (Hindi)	Apurva Mitra
54	1945	Ban Phool (Hindi)	Niren Lahiri
55	1945	Bondita	Hemanta Gupta
56	1945	Dui Purush	Subodh Mitra
57	1945	Mane Na Mane	Sailajanand Mukherji
58	1945	Kalankini	Jyotish Bannerjee
59	1946	Suleh	Apurba Kumar Mitra
60	1946	Prem Ki Duniya	Jyotish Bannerjee
61	1946	Pather Saathi	Naresh Mitra
62	1946	Mandir	Naresh Mitra
63	1946	Suleh (Hindi)	Apura Mitra
64	1947	Burmar Pathey	Hiranmoy Sen
65	1947	Alakananda	Ratan Chatterjee
66	1947	Abhijog	Sushil Majumdar
67	1948	Bicharak	Deb Narayan Gupta
68	1948	Sir Sankarnath	Debaki Bose
69	1948	Kalo Ghorah	Jyotish Bannerjee
70	1948	Jayjatra	Niren Lahiri
71	1948	Ghumiye Achhe Gram	Sailajanand Mukherji
72	1949	Dasiputra	Deb Narayan Gupta
73	1949	Abhijatya	Sukumar Dasgupta
74	1949	Niruddesh	Niren Lahiri
75	1949	Bandhur Path	Chitta Bose
76	1949	Nirdosh Abla (Hindi)	
77	1950	Pattharar Kahini	Deb Narayan Gupta
78	1950	Vidyasagar (1950 film)	Kali Prasad Ghosh
79	1950	Michael Madhusudhan	Modhu Bose
80	1951	Datta	Saumyen Mukhopadhyay
81	1952	Vidyasagar	Kali Prasad Ghosh
82	1954	Mantra Shakti	Chitta Basu
83	1955	Debatra	Haridas Bhattacharya
84	1955	Kankabatir Ghat	Chitta Bose
85	1955	Bir Hambir	Shyam Das
86	1956	Shyamali	Ajoy Kar
87	1956	Paradhin	Modhu Bose
88	1956	Chirakumar Sabha	Debaki Bose
89	1957	Neelachaley Mahaprabhu	Kartick Chattopadhyay
90	1974	Shravan Sandhya	Bireshwar Basu

=== As a director ===
- Krishna Sakha (1927)
- Vipranarayana (1937)

=== As a story writer ===
- Soul of a Slave (1923)

== See also ==
- Rabindra Bharati University
- University of Kolkata
