= Charmurti =

1978 Bengali comedy adventure film

Charmurti (The Four Heroes) is a Bengali comedy adventure film directed by Umanath Bhattacharya based on a Tenida novel of the same name. The film was released on 4 May 1978 under the banner of Mokshada films.

== Plot ==
To celebrate the end of their exams, Tenida and his trio of friends (Kyabla, Habul, and Palaram) decide to spend the holidays at a supposedly haunted forest bungalow in Jhantipahari, a small village near Hazaribag. When they encounter a series of bizarre mysteries, they launch an investigation. Instead of ghosts, the four amateur detectives unmask a gang of local criminals running a counterfeit currency operation near their lodging.

== Cast ==
- Chinmoy Roy as Tenida
- Shibajee as Habul
- Krishna Saha as Kyabla
- Shambhoo Gangulee as Pyalaram
- Rabi Ghosh as Seth Dhunduram
- Kajal Gupta as Kyabla's mother
- Santosh Dutta as Kyabla's uncle
- Biplab Chatterjee as Police officer
- Shambhu Bhattacharya as Gajeswar
- Satya Bandyopadhyay as Ghutghutananda
- Rudraprasad Sengupta as Jhanturam
- Rita Sanyal
- Nimai Dutta
- Samaresh Banerjee
