= Narayan Gangopadhyay =

Indian writer (1918–1970)

- Taraknath Gangopadhyay
- Born: February 4, 1918; Dinajpur, Bengal, British India
- Died: November 8, 1970 (aged 52); Calcutta, West Bengal, India
- Occupations: Author; professor; academic
- Spouse(s): Renuka Ganguly, Asha Devi
- Children: Basabi Roy Chowdhury (Ganguly) (from Renuka Ganguly), Arijit Ganguly
- Writing career
- Notable awards: Ananda Puraskar (1964)

Narayan Gangopadhyay (born Taraknath Gangopadhyay; 4 February 1918–8 November 1970) was an Indian writer and academic, noted for his contributions to modern Bengali literature. He wrote novels, short stories, essays, plays, and children's literature. He is best known for creating the fictional character Tenida, a popular figure in Bengali juvenile fiction. He wrote under the pen name "Narayan."

He was awarded the literary awards Basumati Literary Prize (1968).

== Life ==
Narayan Gangopadhyay was born as Taraknath Gangopadhyay in Baliadingi in Dinjapur district of Bengal in 1918. His paternal side had their roots in the village of Basudebpara, Nalchira in Gournadi thana of Barisal district. His father, Pramathnath Gangopadhyay, was a police officer. Because his father was transferred often, he studied in Dinajpur, Faridpur, Barisal and Kolkata. Narayan Gangopadhyay matriculated from Dinajpur Zila School in 1933. He then took admission at Government Rajendra College in Faridpur but had to leave the town on 1 May 1935 on political grounds. He was interned as a 'revolutionary suspect' and could not appear in the college examinations. Later he took admission in the second year at Brojomohun College in Barisal and passed Intermediate Arts (IA) as a non-collegiate candidate in 1936. He passed the Bachelor of Arts with distinction from the same college in 1938. Famous poet Jibanananda Das was his teacher there. In 1941, he completed the MA from the University of Calcutta, receiving the Brahmamayee Gold Medal for his outstanding results. He earned DPhil from the same university in 1960, for his research in the field of short stories in Bengali literature.

Narayan Gangopadhyay taught at a number of colleges, including Ananda Chandra College, Jalpaiguri (1942–45) and the City College, Kolkata (1945–1955). He started teaching at the University of Calcutta in 1956. His students were the famous actor Soumitra Chatterjee and novelist Sunil Gangopadhyay and Samaresh Majumdar.

== Works ==
Narayan Gangopadhyay began writing poetry while still a student. In due course he became famous for his short stories, novels, plays etc. Narayan Gangopadhyay's first story was published in 'Bichitra'. He was a romantic writer. His novels include Upanibesh (3 volumes, 1944–1947), Samrat O Shresthi (1944), Mandramukhar (1945), Shilalipi (1949), Lalmati (1951), Krishnapaksa (1951), Baitalik (1955), and Asidhara (1957). His volumes of short stories include Trophy (1949), Bitangsa, Janmantar, Bhangabandar, Duhshasan, Bhatiyali (1957), Exhibition, Chhayatari, Ghurni, and Aleyar Rat. Among his other works are several volumes of essays: Sahitya O Sahityik, Sahitye Chhotagalpa (1955), Kathakobid Rabindranath (1965), and Chhotagalper Simarekha (1969). He also wrote stories for children, among them, Saptakanda, Andhakarer Agantuk, Chotader Shrestha Galpa (1952), Chhutir Akash, Khushir Hawa, Jhau Banglor Rahasya, Panchananer Hati, Pataldangar Tenida, Galpa Bali Galpa Shona, Abyartha Laksyabhed, Tenidar Abhiyan (1941). Bhadate Chai and Agantuk were two of his widely acclaimed plays. He also wrote a few screenplays and songs for films and gramophone records.

Narayan Gangopadhyay was a regular contributor to Shanibarer Chithi. Towards the end of his life, he used to write regularly for the weekly Desh under the pen name 'Sunanda'. His writings are informed by his historical sense and patriotic feelings as well as his love for the nature of Bengal. His short stories were highly acclaimed, and he was awarded the Ananda Award (1964) in recognition of his contribution to Bengali literature. The weekly Basumati accorded him a reception in 1968. Narayan Gangopadhyay died on 6 November 1970 in Kolkata.

=== Novels ===
- Uponibesh-1 (উপনিবেশ -১)
- Uponibesh-2 (উপনিবেশ -২)
- Uponibesh-3 (উপনিবেশ -৩)
- Somrat O Sreshthi (সম্রাট ও শ্রেষ্ঠী)
- Mantramukhar (মন্ত্রমুখর)
- Mohananda (মহানন্দা)
- Swarnaseeta (স্বর্ণসীতা)
- Nishijapon (নিশিযাপন) (film version)
- Trophy (ট্রফি)
- Lalmati (লালমাটি)
- Krishnapakkha(কৃষ্ণপক্ষ)
- Bidushok (বিদূষক)
- Boitalik
- Shilalipi (শিলালিপি)
- Oshidhara (অসিধারা)
- Vatiali
- Podoshonchar (পদসঞ্চার)
- Amabossar Gan
- Alokporna (আলোকপর্ণা)

=== Short stories ===
- Golposongroho
- Saper Mathay Moni
- Sreshto Golpo
- Swanirbachito Golpo

=== Dramas ===
- Bhim Badh
- Varate Chai
- Agontuk
- Porer Upokar Korio Na (Tenida series)

=== Satire ===
- Sunandar Journal

=== Essays ===
- Sahitye Chotogolpo
- Bangla Golpo Bichitra
- Chotogolper Shimarekha
- Kothakobid Rabindranath

=== Children literature ===
- Charmurti (Filmed as Charmurti in 1978)
- Charmurtir Abhijan
- Abyartha Lokhyobhed Ebong (not a Tenida story)
- Jhaubanglar Rohosyo
- Kombol Niruddesh
- Tenida o Sindhughotok
- Porer Upokar Korio na (Drama)
- Panchananer Hati (Filmed as Damu in 1996)
- Tenida Somogro
- Rammohan (Biography of Raja Rammohan Roy)
- Samagra Kishore Sahitya
- Cricket Mane Jhijhi

== See also ==
- List of Indian writers
