= Chitta Basu (director) =

Indian film director

Chitta Bose (1907–1993), born as Chittaranjan Bose and also known as Chitta Basu was an Indian film director. He is one of the renowned film directors of West Bengal during the 1960s. He was born on 26 November 1907 in a middle-class family in the Khulna District of present-day Bangladesh.

== Education ==
Though born in Khulna Dist., Bangladesh, he left Bangladesh at an early age and came to Kolkata. He passed the intermediate exam from Bangabasi College and thereafter completed graduation from St. Xaviers college, Kolkata. Also Mr Basu completed post graduation from Calcutta University.

== Struggling days ==
He started working in Great Eastern Departmental Stores for short stint. Basu's maternal uncle Naresh Chandra Mitra, also a renowned director approached him to work with him as an assistant director. He left the job in Great Eastern and started working as an assistant film director.

== Personal life ==
Basu, third of the 10 siblings of Charu Chandra Bose (Zamindar of Khulna district) and Monrama Bose was married to Tushar Kona Roy Chowdhury in the year 1933. Her father Subodh Chandra Roy Chowdhury, was the dewan of princely state of Jodhpur. The couple had 5 sons and 2 daughters. Mr. Basu's third son Dipranjan Basu is also film director at present. Some of Mr Dipranjan Basu's directorial debut: Parabatpriya (1984), Bhalobhasha-o-Andhokar & also many television soaps.

== Rise to fame ==
Basu made his directorial debut with the film "Bondhur Path" in 1946. The film was a hit. In all he made 33 films during his film career.

In 1954 Basu's film Chheley Kaar (starring Chhabi Biswas) won the national award. "Chheley Kaar" is a story about a man finding an unknown child sat in his car in a Park and calling him his father.

Some of Mr. Basu's notable films are: Maya Mriga, Bondhu, Godhuli Bela, Ekti Raat, Putro Bodhu, Rastar Chele, Bindu'r Chele, Mantra Shakti, Jaya, "Sesh Parba" and Prafulla. According to Mr. Basu the most experimental film of his life was "Rastar Chele". "Mr Basu's challenge to the Bengali Film Industry". MR. Basu made 32 films in his film career.

== Filmography ==
- Bondhur Path (1946)
- Chheley Kaar (1954)
- Mantra Shakti (1954)
- Maya Mriga
- Bondhu
- Godhuli Bela
- Ekti Raat (1956)
- Putro Bodhu
- Rastar Chele
- Bindur Chhele (1952)
- Jaya
- Sesh Parba
- Prafulla

== Death ==
Basu died on 5 December 1993 (eight months after the death of his beloved wife) following a cerebral attack.
