= Sagardwipey Jawker Dhan =

2019 Indian Bengali adventure film

- Directed by: Sayantan Ghosal
- Written by: Sougata Basu
- Produced by: Surinder Films & Champion Movies
- Starring: Parambrata Chatterjee; Gaurav Chakrabarty; Koel Mallick; Kanchan Mallick
- Cinematography: Romyadip Saha
- Edited by: Sayantan Ghosal
- Music by: Bickram Ghosh
- Production company: Surinder Films
- Distributed by: Surinder Films
- Release date: 6 December 2019
- Running time: 2 Hours 5 minutes
- Country: India
- Language: Bengali

Sagardwipey Jawker Dhan (/səɡərdwiːpeɪdʒɔːkərðən/ transl. The Treasure of Ghost in the Sea-island) is a 2019 Indian Bengali-language action-adventure film co-written and directed by Sayantan Ghosal and written by Sougata Basu with influence of the original story by Hemendra Kumar Roy. The film is based on the adventure story of Bimal-Kumar duo written by Hemendra Kumar Roy. It is the second movie after Jawker Dhan. The film had a theatrical release on 6 December 2019.

== Plot ==
Bimal and Kumar meet a petrol pump owner Bakashyam Dhar, whose father Radheshyam Dhar was a scientist. Radheshyam was very adventurous and many years back he sited a remote island in the sea of South East Asia, where he discovered a stone, which has a layer of a mythical chemical compound named Red Mercury. Radheshyam's research suggested that this chemical could be a very effective substitute for the gradually exhausting fossil fuel.

Bimal and Kumar begin their quest for this chemical. In this venture, Bimal comes across a doctor, Rubi Chatterjee. Rubi is also in search of the same mythical compound that is necessary to save the life of an Extraterrestrial life child.

== Cast ==
- Parambrata Chatterjee as Bimal
- Gaurav Chakrabarty as Kumar
- Koel Mallick as Dr. Rubi Chatterjee
- Kanchan Mullick as Bakashyam Dhar
- Rajatava Dutta as Al-Mahri
- Koushik Sen as Hiranmoy Bose
- Adolina Chakrabarty as Rumi
- Arindal Bagchi as Nepal Master

== Soundtrack ==
Track listing
No.	Title	Singer	Length
1.	"Shuntey Pai Nirobota"	Shovan Ganguly	4:11
