= Jahar Ganguly =

Bengali actor

- Born: October 1904
- Died: 1969
- Occupation: Actor

Jahar Ganguly (October 1904 – 1969) was an Indian actor and theater personality. He received Best Actor award at the 6th Annual Bengal Film Journalists' Association Awards in 1943 for his performance in Bandi.

== Career ==
Ganguly was born in the undivided 24 Parganas Dist, British India. He worked in number of Bengali and Hindi films in 40s and 50s as a supporting actor in comedy counterparts to the dramatic lead. He got break through in Dena Paona directed by Premankur Atorthy. Ganguly acted under Satyajit Ray's direction in Parash Pathar and Chiriyakhana. He also performed as a stage actor until the 1960.

== Filmography ==
- Geeta
- Tulsidas (1954)
- Manmoyee Girls' School
- Mantra Shakti (1954)
- Sarbajanin Bibahotsab
- Bekar Nashan (1938)
- Ekalavya
- Jakher Dhan (1939)
- Bishabriksha (1936 film)
- Kavi Joydev (1941)
- Bijoyini
- Pratishodh (1941)
- Shri Radha
- Nandini
- Bondi
- Shahar Theke Dooray
- Sahadharmini
- Dwanda (1943)
- Pather Dabi (1947)
- Poshya Putra
- Mriter Martye Agaman (1959)
- Nilanguriya
- Rani (1943)
- Dui Purush (1945)
- Priya Bandhabi
- Matir Ghar (1944)
- Path Bendhe Dilo
- Saat Number Kayedi (1953)
- Nader Nimai (1960)
- Khokababur Pratyabartan (1960)
- Mane Na Mana
- Kamona (1949)
- Grihalakshmi
- Dui Purush
- Trijama (1956)
- Raj Lakshmi
- Swapna O Sadhana
- Kankantala Light Railway
- Meghmukti
- Saheb Bibi Golam (1956)
- Sitar Patal Prabesh
- Maa-o- Chhele
- Mantra Shakti
- Bhagwan Shri Shri Ramakrishna
- Adarsha Hindu Hotel (film)
- Sagarika
- Mamlar Phal
- Rajpath
- Nabajanma
- Manik (1961)
- Bandhan
- Nirjan Saikate (1963)
- Palatak
- Tridhara
- Uttar Falguni
- Jiban Kahini
- Bireshwar Vivekananda (1964)
- Chupi Chupi Aashey (1960)
- Sudhu Ekti Bachhar
- Chiriyakhana (1967)
- Parash Pathar (1958)
- Charan Kabi Mukundadas
- Hansamithun
- Arogyaniketan
- Jibon Niye
