= Jay Jayanti =

1971 Bengali musical film by Sunil Basu Mullick

- Theatrical poster
- Directed by: Sunil Basu Mullick
- Screenplay by: Mani Burma; Additional screenplay: Partha Pratim Chowdhury
- Story by: Mani Burma
- Produced by: Bhabani Basu Mullick
- Starring: Uttam Kumar; Aparna Sen; Lolita Chatterjee; Anubha Gupta; Tarun Kumar
- Cinematography: Bijoy Ghosh
- Edited by: Rabin Das
- Music by: Manabendra Mukhopadhyay
- Production company: M. K. G. Productions Pvt. Ltd.
- Distributed by: Kalika Films
- Release date: 12 March 1971
- Running time: 181 minutes
- Country: India
- Language: Bengali

Jay Jayanti is a 1971 Indian Bengali-language children's musical film directed by Sunil Basu Mullick in his directorial debut. Produced by his wife Bhabani Basu Mullick under the banner of M. K. G. Productions Pvt. Ltd., the film stars Aparna Sen as Jayanti who joins the wealthy Roy family as a governess, wins over the five children, and eventually earns the respect of their stern uncle Sanjoy, played by Uttam Kumar. Its supporting cast includes Lolita Chatterjee, Tarun Kumar, Anubha Gupta and Gita Dey.

An adaptation of the 1965 American film The Sound of Music, the film is written by Mani Burma and Partha Pratim Chowdhury, with dialogues by Shyamal Gupta. Pairing Kumar and Sen for the fourth time, its soundtrack is composed by Manabendra Mukhopadhyay, with lyrics by Gupta. Bijoy Ghosh handled its cinematography, while Rabin Das edited the film.

Jay Jayanti was theatrically released on 12 March 1971, opening to huge positive response. Emerged as one of the highest-grosser Bengali films at that point of time, it eventually attained a cult status over the years. At the 18th National Film Awards, the film received Best Female Playback Singer (Sandhya Mukherjee) for "Amader Chhuti Chhuti". (Note: At the 18th National Film Awards, Sandhya Mukherjee was awarded for two songs from two different films, the other being "Ore Sokol Sona Molin Holo" from Nishi Padma (1970).) It was remade into Hindi by Gulzar as Parichay (1972), starring Jeetendra and Jaya Bachchan.

== Plot ==
Jayanti Bose takes a job as a governess at the Roy villa against her family's wishes. She has to look after five notoriously mischievous children, the nephews and nieces of Sanjay Roy, a wealthy and arrogant man. The children had previously successfully driven away twelve governesses. However, Jayanti wins their affection when she protects them from their uncle's wrath. Later, when Jayanti leaves the house due to a misunderstanding, both the children and Sanjay regret it and decide to bring her back.

== Cast ==
- Uttam Kumar as Sanjoy Roy
- Aparna Sen as Jayanti Bose
- Anubha Gupta
- Biren Chatterjee
- Chandrabati Devi
- Gita Dey
- Lolita Chatterjee
- Montu Banerjee
- Mani Srimani
- Tarun Kumar

== Music ==
Manabendra Mukherjee composed the music of the film in his fifth collaboration with Kumar, after working on Champadangar Bou (1954), Saajher Pradip (1955), Hrad (1955) and Maya Mriga (1960).

Track listing
| No. | Title | Singer(s) | Length |
|---|---|---|---|
| 1. | "Amra To Aar Chhoto Nei" | Aarti Mukherjee | 2:55 |
| 2. | "Cholchhe Railer Gari" | Sipra Bose | 2:56 |
| 3. | "Keno Dako Bare Bare" | Sandhya Mukherjee | 3:06 |
| 4. | "Ke Prothom Chande Gechhe" | Sandhya Mukherjee | 3:18 |
| 5. | "Bah Chharata To Besh" | Sandhya Mukherjee | 3:14 |
| 6. | "Aro Kachhe Esho" | Manabendra Mukherjee, Sucheta Banerjee | 3:21 |
| 7. | "Jhan Jhanan Sur Jhankare" | Munawar Ali Khan, Sandhya Mukherjee | 3:26 |
| 8. | "Amader Chhuti Chhuti" | Sandhya Mukherjee | 3:20 |
| Total length: | | | 25:39 |
