= Kopai River =

Coordinates: 23°51′41″N 88°01′43″E

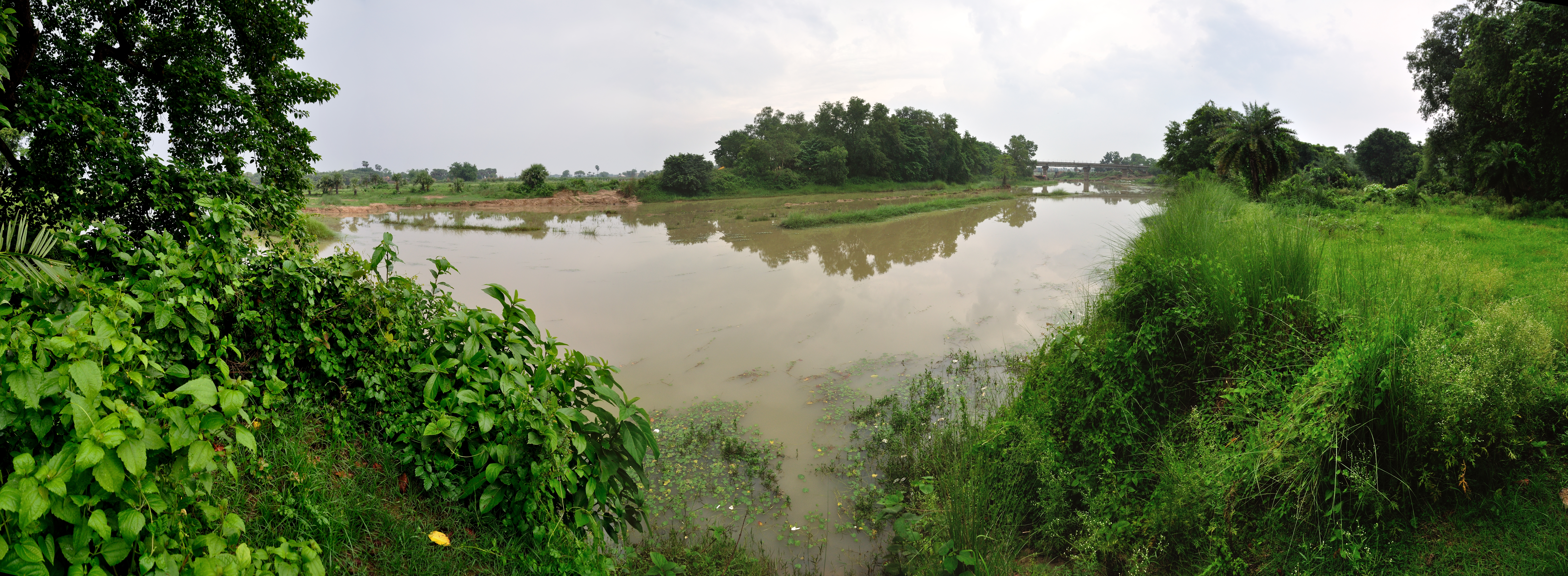
- River Kopai at Ballavpur, Birbhum

Location
- Country: India
- State: West Bengal
- Cities: Santiniketan, Kirnahar (Mirati), Labhpur

Physical characteristics
- Discharge
  - location: Mayurakshi River

Basin features
- Tributaries
  - left: Bakreshwar River

The Kopai River (also called Sal River) is a tributary of the Bakreshwar River. It flows past such towns as Santiniketan, Bolpur, Kankalitala, Kirnahar and Labhpur in Birbhum district in the Indian state of West Bengal. It is a small river in dry season but overflows its banks during the monsoon. There is a village name Chhora (ছোড়া) beside this river. Also Barghata (বড়ঘাটা), Nichinta (নিচিন্তা), Rupuspur (রুপুসপুর), Perua, (পেরুয়া) etc depend on this river.

== Literary association ==
The area around the river quite often has purple soil, which forms ravines on the river bank with weathering and is popular as the khoai. It has inspired literary figures in the area. It is described by Rabindranath Tagore as follows –

amader chhoto nadi chale banke banke
baisakh mase taar haatu jal thake

Our small stream moves forward in bends and curves
In the month of Baisakh it only has knee deep waters

The local name of a sickle-shaped, channel like curve in the river inspired the title of the novel Hansuli Banker Upakatha (Story of the Sickle-shaped Curve) by Tarasankar Bandyopadhyay, made into a film by Tapan Sinha.

== Archaeology ==
Microliths of crystalline stone and petrified wood from about 1250–1000 BC are found in many places in the Ajay-Kunur-Kopai river system.

== See also ==
- List of rivers of India
- Rivers of India
