= List of Odia films of 1959 =

This is a list of films produced by the Ollywood film industry based in Cuttack in 1959:

== A-Z ==
Title	Director	Cast	Genre	Notes
1959
Maa	Nitai Palit	Chandana, Gaura Ghosh, Laxmipriya Mahapatra		
ଶ୍ରୀ ଶ୍ରୀ ମହାଲକ୍ଷ୍ମୀ ପୂଜା Shree Shree Mahalaxmi Puja	Biswanath Nayak	Bauribandhu, Jharana Das, Anubha Gupta	Fantasy	
