= Sundara =

Sundara is a Sanskrit term meaning beautiful, lovely (of a person), or generally, noble, well, and right. As an Indian personal name, it may refer to:

- Sundara Ramaswamy (1931–2006), Tamil poet and writer
- Ajahn Sundara (born 1946), French-born ordained monastic in the Buddhist Thai Forest Tradition of Ajahn Chah
- M. S. Sundara Rajan (born 1950), Indian banker, economist and head of Indian Bank
- Maravarman Sundara Pandyan, Pandyan king from 1216 and 1238
- Jatavarman Sundara Pandyan I, Pandyan king from 1251 to 1268

== Other uses ==
- Sundarakanda (disambiguation)
  - Sundara Kanda, the fifth book in the Hindu epic, the Ramayana
- "Sundara", a song by Amitraj, Pankaj Padghan, Shashank Powar and Adarsh Shinde from the 2015 Indian film Tu Hi Re

== See also ==
- Sundar (disambiguation)
- Sundaram (disambiguation)
- Soundarya (disambiguation)
- Sundara Purushan (disambiguation)
- Senthil (disambiguation)
