= Hansuli Banker Upakatha =

Hansuli Banker Upakatha (lit. 'The Short Story of Hansuli and Banke') may refer to these in Indian media:

- Hansuli Banker Upakatha (novel), a 1951 novel by Tarasankar Bandyopadhyay
- Hansuli Banker Upakatha (film), a 1962 film by Tapan Sinha based on the novel
