= Isi Ka Naam Zindagi =

- Promotional poster
- Directed by: Kalidas
- Produced by: Ratan Mukherjee
- Starring: Aamir Khan; Farah; Pran; Shakti Kapoor
- Music by: Bappi Lahiri
- Release date: 28 August 1992
- Running time: 145 minutes
- Country: India
- Language: Hindi
- Box office: ₹18 million (equivalent to ₹140 million or US$1.4 million in 2023)

Isi Ka Naam Zindagi (transl. This is called life) is a 1992 Indian Hindi-language supernatural action comedy film directed by Kalidas, starring Aamir Khan, Farah, Pran, Shakti Kapoor in pivotal roles. It was a box office failure. However, actor Pran gave one of his best performances, which was used to promote the movie. It is a remake of the National Award-winning Bengali film Banchharamer Bagaan (1980), which itself is based on the Bengali play Shajano Bagaan by Manoj Mitra.

== Plot ==
Isi Ka Naam Zindagi is a romantic family story set during the British Raj.

Bansiram (Pran) has owned and maintained a plot of land donated to him by a kind village aristocrat (Shakti Kapoor). After the aristocrat dies, his amoral son praises the enviable plot and wants it. Bansiram refuses to sell, and the son is determined to get it. Bansiram appeals to the British for protection, which they provide, and he is able to save his property.

Soon the son passes away; his look-alike son, Devraj, comes to manage the estate. Devraj does not consider Bansiram's land a priority, and years go by. The aristocrat's soul wanders and waits in anguish and pain. When Devraj goes to see Bansiram, he finds an elderly semi-senile man and his grandson, Chotu (Aamir Khan), who wants to produce alcohol on the land. Devraj takes advantage of the situation with unpredictable results.

== Cast ==
- Aamir Khan as Chhotu
- Farah as Chumki
- Pran as Bansiram
- Shakti Kapoor as Zamindar Thakur Dhanraj Singh and his son Devraj
- Beena as Kamla
- Rajesh Puri as Gyansagar, the astrologer
- Asrani as Munim
- Tej Sapru as Vijay (Devraj's Elder Son)
- Babloo Mukherjee as Jai (Devraj's second son)
- Anjan Srivastav as Doctor
- Bharat Kapoor as Chumki's Father
- Anup Jalota as Himself in title song
- Shiva as Shera
- Tarun Ghosh as Chidkoo, the sorcerer

== Soundtrack ==
Ramesh Pant write all the lyrics.

1. "Gulai Gulai Go Ha Gulai Gulai Go Mile Koi Anjana" — Alka Yagnik, Bappi Lahiri
2. "Isi Ka Naam Zindagi" — Anup Jalota
3. "Gulai Gulai Go..." (v2) — Bappi Lahiri, Alka Yagnik
4. "Tum Jaisi Koi Sunder Is Duniya Me Na Hogi" — Amit Kumar
5. "Aiyo Arre Aiyo Bina Paas Aaye More" — Asha Bhosle
6. "Bam Bhole" (Mai Sare Gaon Ka Chaila) — Alka Yagnik, Bappi Lahiri
7. "Raat Ki Hu Rani Meri Jalim Hai Jawani Jab Main" — Shobha Joshi
8. "Zaraa Ruk Jaa Ai Jaldi Kyaa Abhi Pyaar Mat Karanaa" — Anuradha Paudwal, Udit Narayan
9. "Jara Ruk Ja Ai Jaldee Kya" — Anuradha Paudwal, Udit Narayan
