= Senthil (disambiguation) =

Senthil is an Indian slapstick comedy actor in Tamil cinema.

Senthil or Sendhil is an Indian masculine given name (derived from Sundar) and may refer to:

- Murugan, a Hindu deity, popularly worshipped by the Tamil Hindus in India, better known in other parts of India as Karthikeya or Subramanya
- Senthil Ganesh, Indian singer and actor
- Senthil Krishna, Indian actor
- Senthil Kumar, Indian actor, television presenter and radio jockey
- Sendhil Mullainathan, Indian-American economist
- Sendhil Ramamurthy, Indian-American actor
- K. K. Senthil Kumar, Indian cinematographer in the Telugu film industry

== See also ==
- Sundara (disambiguation)
- Senthil Nagar, neighbourhood in Chennai, Tamil Nadu, India
