= Saajher Pradip =

1955 Bengali film by Sudhangshu Mukherjee

- সাঁঝের প্রদীপ
- Directed by: Sudhangshu Mukherjee
- Written by: Prabhabati Devi Saraswati
- Screenplay by: Mani Barma (Dialogues also)
- Based on: Saanjher Pradip novel by Prabhabati Devi Saraswati
- Starring: Uttam Kumar; Suchitra Sen; Chhabi Biswas; Tulsi Chakraborty Bhanu Bannerjee; Chhaya Devi; Molina Devi; Shishir Batabyal; Gurudas Bannerjee; Kanu Bannerjee; Dhiraj Bhattacharya; Sumana Bhattacharya
- Cinematography: Dibyendu Ghosh
- Edited by: Sukumar Mukhopadhyay
- Music by: Manabendra Mukherjee
- Production company: Sreelekha Pictures
- Distributed by: Sreelekha Film Release
- Release date: 18 January 1955 (India)
- Running time: 130 min.
- Country: India
- Language: Bengali

Saajher Pradip is a 1955 Bengali film directed by Sudhangshu Mukherjee. It was written by Prabhabati Devi Saraswati and music was composed by Manabendra Mukherjee. This is a drama film. It was released on 18 January 1955. The film stars Uttam Kumar and Suchitra Sen in lead roles and Chhabi Biswas, Tulsi Chakraborty, Bhanu Bannerjee, Chhaya Devi, Molina Devi, Shishir Batabyal, Gurudas Bannerjee, Kanu Bannerjee, Dhiraj Bhattacharya and Sumana Bhattacharya in the supporting roles. The film was produced by Sreelekha Pictures and it became a semi-hit at the box office and ran for 50 days in theaters.

== Cast ==
- Suchitra Sen
- Chhabi Biswas
- Tulsi Chakraborty
- Bhanu Bannerjee
- Chhaya Devi
- Molina Devi
- Shishir Batabyal
- Gurudas Bannerjee
- Kanu Bannerjee
- Dhiraj Bhattacharya
- Sumana Bhattacharya
- Uttam Kumar
- Sabita Chatterjee
- Haren Mukherjee
- Sushil Roy

== Soundtrack ==
Saajher Pradip

Soundtrack album by Manabendra Mukharjee
- Released: 1955
- Recorded: 1954
- Studio: Sreelekha Pictures
- Genre: Feature film soundtrack
- Labels: Jio Saavan, Wink Music

Manabendra Mukharjee chronology
Champadangar Bou (1954)	Saajher Pradip (1955)	Hrad (film) (1955)

All lyrics are written by Shyamal Gupta; all music is composed by Manabendra Mukharjee.

Songs
No.	Title	Playback	Length
1.	"Kon Se Deshe Jay Re Bhese"	Gayatri Bose	3:20
2.	"Chupi Chupi Ele Ke"	Manabendra Mukherjee	1:58
