= Kalyanasundaram =

Kalyanasundaram may refer to:

- B. Kalyanasundaram, an Indian cricketer
- K. Kalyanasundaram, an Indian politician
- Kalyanasundaram Higher Secondary School, a school in Thanjavur, India
- M. Kalyanasundaram, an Indian politician
- Pattukkottai Kalyanasundaram, an Indian poet
- Thiru. V. Kalyanasundaram, an Indian scholar

== See also ==
- Kalyan (disambiguation)
- Sundaram (disambiguation)
