= Sundaram =

Sundaram may refer to:

== People with the surname ==
- Anjan Sundaram, journalist and author
- Jomo Kwame Sundaram, Malaysian economist
- Kalyan Sundaram (1904–1992), Indian civil servant
- Mugur Sundar, choreographer in South Indian cinema
- P. R. Sundaram (1951–2025), Indian politician
- Raghu Sundaram, Indian-born American academic
- Raju Sundaram (born 1968), Indian actor, film director, and choreographer
- Tribhuvandas Luhar ("Sundaram", 1908–1991), Gujarati poet
- V. A. Sundaram (1896 –1967), an activist in the Indian Independence movement
- Vivan Sundaram (1943–2023), Indian artist

== Other ==
- Sieve of Sundaram, a method for finding prime numbers
- Sundaram (theatre group), a Bengali theatre group
- Vietnam Veedu Sundaram, a playwright and screenwriter

== See also ==
- Sundara (disambiguation)
- Sundar (disambiguation)
