= Banchharamer Bagaan =

1980 Bengali satirical comedy film by Tapan Sinha

- Directed by: Tapan Sinha
- Based on: Shajano Bagaan by Manoj Mitra
- Screenplay by: Tapan Sinha
- Dialogues by: Tapan Sinha; Manoj Mitra
- Story by: Manoj Mitra
- Produced by: Dhiresh Kumar Chakraborty
- Starring: Manoj Mitra; Dipankar De; Rabi Ghosh; Nirmal Kumar; Bhanu Banerjee; Madhabi Mukherjee; Bhishma Guhathakurata; Debika Mukherjee
- Cinematography: Bimal Mukherjee
- Edited by: Subodh Roy
- Music by: Tapan Sinha
- Production company: D. K. Film Enterprises
- Distributed by: D. K. Film Enterprises
- Release date: 17 October 1980
- Running time: 128 minutes
- Country: India
- Language: Bengali

Banchharamer Bagaan (Bengali pronunciation: [ban.t͡ʃʰa.ra.meɾ ba.ɡan]; transl. Banchharam's garden) is a 1980 Bengali-language satirical comedy-horror film co-written and directed by Tapan Sinha. Produced by Dhiresh Kumar Chakraborty under the banner of D. K. Film Enterprises, the film is based on Manoj Mitra's celebrated stage-play Shajano Bagaan. It stars Mitra himself as Banchharam, an elderly frail peasant who outwits a tyrannical landlord attempting to seize his beloved garden by deceptively staying alive and healthy, despite having signed over his land in exchange for a monthly pension upon his promised death. Dipankar De plays dual roles as the landlord and his son, alongside Madhabi Mukherjee, Nirmal Kumar, Biplab Chatterjee, Bhishma Guhathakurata and Debika Mukherjee in the supporting roles, with Bhanu Banerjee and Rabi Ghosh in special appearances.

After Sinha watched the play in 1978, he immediately decided to adapt it into a film, with Mitra reprising the role from the play. Banchharamer Bagaan marks the first collaboration between Sinha and Mitra, and also the debut of the latter. Music of the film is composed by Sinha himself, while Bimal Mukherjee and Subodh Roy handled its cinematography and editing respectively.

Banchharamer Bagaan was theatrically released on 17 October 1980, opening to highly positive response. It ran for over 210 days in theatres, emerging to be one of the highest-grossing Bengali films of the year. It attained a cult status over the years and is regarded as "one of the best comedy films" by The Times of India. At the 18th Filmfare Awards East, the film received several accolades, including Best Film, Best Director (Sinha) and Best Actor (Mitra).

Banchharamer Bagaan was remade into Hindi as Isi Ka Naam Zindagi (1992) and into Marathi as Narbachi Wadi (2013).

== Plot ==
The film revolves around the struggles of lonely aged persons. An elderly man becomes a one-man army against the corrupt society. There is an old peasant's garden, which the zamindar desperately want to occupy. Despite the continuous machinations and traps put forward by the zamindar, the aged, frail peasant Bancharam, in some way or the other, continues to live in his garden, and manages to maintain it as well.

== Cast ==
- Manoj Mitra as Banchharam
- Dipankar De in dual roles as
  - Chhakari Dutta, Panchkari's son and a landlord
  - Nakari Dutta, Chhakari's son and an advocate
- Nirmal Kumar as Lawyer
- Madhabi Mukherjee as Zamindar's Wife
- Biplab Chatterjee in dual roles as
  - Sishir / Hontka, an aspiring film-producer
  - Kontka
- Devika Mukherjee as Chumki
- Bhishma Guhathakurta as Gopinath
- Shambhu Bhattacharya as Chaubey Ji
- Premangshu Bose as Chumki's Father
- Ramen Roy Chowdhury as Hride, Nakari's nephew

=== Cameo appearances ===
- Bhanu Banerjee as Priest
- Rabi Ghosh as Doctor

== Special screening ==
- Kolkata International Film Festival in 2024 for Manoj Mitra Tribute Section

== Remakes ==
Ratan Mukherjee of Rajlaxmi Pictures proposed to Sinha to remake the film in Hindi, but the latter turned down it due to the creative differences, as the former had insisted Sinha to have Pran and Amitabh Bachchan. However, Mukherjee remade the film into Hindi under the title Isi Ka Naam Zindagi in 1992, with Kalidas as director. As per his previous plan, Pran played the lead, while Shakti Kapoor played the role of the landlord, replacing Bachchan who was in a hiatus at that time. It also starred Aamir Khan and Farha Naaz in the film, while it became a box-office bomb. In 2013, Banchharamer Bagaan was remade by Aditya Sarpotdar into Marathi as Narbachi Wadi.
