= Champadangar Bou =

1954 Indian film

- Directed by: Nirmal Dey
- Screenplay by: Nirmal Dey
- Story by: Tarasankar Bandyopadhyay (Lyrics also)
- Produced by: Nirmal Dey
- Starring: Sabitri Chatterjee; Uttam Kumar; Kanu Banerjee; Tulsi Chakraborty
- Cinematography: Nirmal Dey
- Edited by: Sukumar Sengupta
- Music by: Manabendra Mukhopadhyay
- Production company: Nirmal Dey Productions
- Distributed by: Kalpana Movies Limited
- Release date: 1954
- Running time: 95 minutes
- Country: India
- Language: Bengali

Champadangar Bou was a Bengali drama film directed by Nirmal Dey. This film was based on a story by Tarashankar Bandyopadhyay. It was released on 1954 under the banner of Nirmal Dey Productions. The music direction was done by Manabendra Mukhopadhyay. This movie stars Uttam Kumar, Sabitri Chatterjee in lead roles and Kanu Banerjee, Tulsi Chakraborty, and Anubha Gupta play in the important supporting roles. There is another film named Chapa Dangar Bou in Dhallywood industry which was released in 1986.

== Plot ==
There were four in the family. One of them was Kadambini. She was better known as the 'Champar Dangar Bou'. Her husband Setap, was the head of the village Panchayet. In need of money the villagers run to him only. He used to lend money keeping some thing mortgage. He felt that money was the most important thing in the life. His brother Mahatap was completely opposite. Money was like poison to him. He used to live life in fun. Mahatap's wife Manoda always wanted him to be more calculative in life like his elder brother. While Setap was only interested in money, his wife Kadambini was only concerned about Mahatap gladly. In spite the differences between two brothers Kadambini was trying to keep their family happy and united until Ghoton entered the scene. Mahatap released his mortgaged paddy and Ghoton without informing his brother Setap - though Mahatap promised to fill the granary again, but Setap still called Ghoton. Ghoton said Setap about the illicit relationship between Kadambini and Mahatap. He also said that Mahatap was doing many things in consultation with Kadambini about which Setap was unaware of. Setap became mad hearing those words from Ghoton. He became anxious to know about what he was unaware of.

== Cast ==
- Uttam Kumar as Mahatap
- Sabitri Chatterjee as Kadambini
- Kanu Banerjee as Setap
- Tulsi Chakraborty as Ghoton
- Anubha Gupta as Manoda
- Kamala Adhikari
- Asha Devi
- Deben Bandopadhyay
- Premangshu Bose
- Ardhendu Mukherjee
- Kabita Sarkar

== Soundtrack ==
Champadangar Bou

Soundtrack album by Manabendra Mukherjee
- Released: 1954
- Recorded: 1953
- Studio: Nirmal Dey Productions
- Genre: Feature film soundtrack
- Label: Angel Digital Private Limited
- Producer: Nirmal Dey

Manabendra Mukherjee chronology
| Mani-Ar-Manik (1954) | Champadangar Bou (1954) | Saajher Pradip (1955) |

All lyrics are written by Tarashankar Bandopadhyay; all music is composed by Manabendra Mukherjee.

Songs
| No. | Title | Length |

== Reception ==
The film was critically acclaimed. The legendary Satyajit Ray praised of the direction of Nirmal Dey and Uttam's performance. He first saw Basu Paribar in 1952 and likes it, so he continued watch Sharey Chuattor 1953 and this film. He was too much impressed. The film become successful at the box office.
