= Dhatri Debata =

1948 Bengali film

- Directed by: Kaliprasad Ghosh
- Based on: Dhatri Debata by Tarashankar Bandyopadhyay
- Production company: Lok Chitra Pratisthan
- Release date: 26 November 1948
- Country: India
- Language: Bengali

Dhatri Debata (lit. 'Earth Goddess') is a 1948 Indian Bengali-language social drama film directed by Kaliprasad Ghosh. The film is based on the 1939 novel Dhatri Debata by Tarashankar Bandyopadhyay. It was released on 26 November 1948 under the banner Lok Chitra Pratisthan.

== Plot ==
The film follows Shibnath, a young student born into a Zamindar family in Birbhum district. As he grows older, married with Gouri, he faces a conflict between the oppressive traditions of the zamindari system and the ideals of social reform inspired by the Swadeshi movement.

== Cast ==
- Chhaya Devi as Pishima
- Sombhu Mitra
- Nripati Chattopadhyay
- Anup Kumar as Shibnath
- Chhanda Devi
- Rajlakshmi Devi
- Kaliprasad Ghosh
