= Kavi (1949 film) =

- Directed by: Debaki Kumar Bose
- Story by: Tarashankar Bandyopadhyay
- Based on: Kabi by Tarashankar Bandyopadhyay
- Produced by: Debaki Kumar Bose
- Starring: Robin Majumdar; Anubha Gupta; Tulsi Chakraborty
- Cinematography: Dhiren Dey
- Edited by: Robin Das
- Music by: Anil Bagchi
- Distributed by: Deluxe Film Distributors
- Release date: 21 January 1949
- Running time: 151 minutes
- Country: India
- Language: Bengali

Kavi is a Bengali drama film directed and produced by Debaki Kumar Bose based on the novel Kabi by Tarashankar Bandyopadhyay. The film was released on 21 January 1949 under the banner of Chitramaya Productions.

== Plot ==
Nitai, a railway porter madly want to become a poet. He receives local recognition for composing and reciting poetry during village contests. As his reputation grows, he becomes involved in emotionally with poetry which leads personal tragedy.

== Cast ==
- Robin Majumdar as Nitai
- Anubha Gupta as Thakurjhi
- Nitish Mukhopadhyay
- Nilima Das as Basan
- Tulsi Chakraborty
- Nripati Chattopadhyay
- Haridhan Mukherjee
- Ashu Bose
- Nibhanani Devi
- Rajlakshmi Devi
- Reba Devi
- Kumar Mitra
