= Parichay (film) =

1972 Indian Hindi-language film

- Theatrical release poster
- Directed by: Gulzar
- Written by: Gulzar (dialogues & lyrics)
- Screenplay by: Gulzar; D.N. Mukherjee
- Story by: R.K. Mitra
- Based on: Bengali novel Rangeen Uttarain by Raj Kumar Maitra
- Produced by: V. K. Sobti
- Starring: Jeetendra; Jaya Bhaduri
- Cinematography: K Vaikunth
- Edited by: Waman Bhonsle; Gurudutt Shirali
- Music by: Rahul Dev Burman
- Production company: Tirupathi Pictures
- Release date: 20 October 1972
- Running time: 138 minutes
- Country: India
- Language: Hindi

Parichay (transl. Introduction) (Note: The reference is to Rai Sahab A. P. Roy' proper introduction to his 5 grandchildren, who live with him, but in a completely aloof manner. Both the grandchildren as well as Rai Sahab consider one another almost like villains, with absolutely no or very little communication. It is the entry of Ravi as a teacher in the household that makes them understand one another. He acted as a catalytic agent for their introduction (Parichay) to one another.) is a 1972 Indian Hindi-language drama film, produced by V. K. Sobti under the Tirupathi Pictures banner and directed by Gulzar. It stars Jeetendra, Jaya Bhaduri; while Sanjeev Kumar, Vinod Khanna have given special appearances and the music was composed by Rahul Dev Burman. A remake of the 1971 Uttam Kumar film Jay Jayanti, the film was reported to be based on the Bengali novel Rangeen Uttarain by Raj Kumar Maitra, and partially inspired by the 1965 movie The Sound of Music.

== Plot ==
Rai Sahab A. P. Roy is a retired colonel who lives in his family mansion with his five grandchildren. All five children are estranged from him as they believe he is responsible for their father Nilesh Roy's death. Rai Sahab is a strict disciplinarian who has become cold and miserable after Nilesh, his son, stubbornly leaves him to pursue music professionally against his wishes. After his son's death, he brings the children to live with him, however, the children refuse to obey him and constantly flout his rules. Rai Sahab is desperately seeking a tutor for them, but no teacher lasts for more than a few weeks, as none of the teachers can turn his 'savage' grandchildren into well-behaved people.

Ravi is looking for a job in the city, when he gets a letter from his uncle, informing him of a job opening for a tutor at Rai Sahab's house in his village. While he does not take to Rai Sahab's cold demeanor in their first meeting, he initially takes the job out of need. Later Rai Sahab tells him he believes Ravi can set his grandchildren straight and implores him to do so. Ravi promises to try.

The children try their best to scare Ravi away, as they have with previous teachers, however, instead of complaining about them Ravi laughs at their pranks and tries to befriend them. He realizes that Rai Sahab has strict rules against singing and laughing in the house and that the children are not even allowed to play outside as they had once tried to run away. When Rai Sahab leaves home for a few weeks for work, Ravi opens up Nilesh's old room and starts playing his sitar. The children open up to him after this. He regularly takes them out on picnics, plays with them, and tells them stories. All the children start studying with Ravi and their behavior changes, becoming more receptive and respectful of elders. Ravi and Rama the oldest of the siblings slowly begin to develop feelings for each other.

Rama begrudges Rai Sahab as she believes he never reached out to her father or them when they were destitute and arrived many days after her father's death, despite her father had written to him earlier. However, she finds out from Ravi that Rai Sahab received the letter very late, as he was away on business, and left as soon as he read it, without bothering to even carry anything with him. He reminds her how Rai Sahab lived with them for two days wearing the same clothes he came in, pleading with them to come and live with him. Rama realizes that she has misjudged her grandfather.

A few days later, Rai Sahab returns to find the children studying with Rama and his son's framed photo hanging in their foyer. At first, he is upset but equally surprised to see his grandchildren studying quietly and greeting him respectfully, something that has not happened before. He finds out that Ravi has had to leave in his absence as he was offered a job in the city. However, he is extremely happy at the children's changed behavior and begins playing and laughing with them, thankful to Ravi for having 'introduced' him to his grandchildren.

In the city Ravi misses Rama. He received a letter from her and wonders if he should go back and ask Rai Sahab for her hand in marriage. His friend Amit encourages him, and he leaves to meet Rai Sahab. Upon meeting him, he learns that Rai Sahab intends to marry Rama to a family friend's grandson - a wish he could not fulfill with his son. Dejected, Ravi leaves without meeting the kids and Rama. As he packs and leaves for the railway station, Rai Sahab asks Rama if she met Ravi. Rama is surprised. In a poignant moment, Rai Sahab looks at Rama's face and realizes the truth. He brings her to the station just as the train pulls out with Ravi standing in the doorway. Seeing Rama and Rai Sahab, Ravi jumps out of the moving train, and both unite. An ending scene invites audiences to their wedding.

== Cast ==
- Jeetendra as Ravi Kalra , a graduate who is in between jobs.
- Jaya Bhaduri as Rama Roy, the eldest of the siblings and Rai Sahab's eldest granddaughter.
- Pran as Retired Colonel A. P. Roy aka Rai Sahab, Rama's grandfather and Ravi's employer.
- Sanjeev Kumar as Nilesh Roy, Rama's father
- Veena as Sati Roy aka Sati Devi, Rai Saheb's sister
- Gita Siddharth as Sujata Roy, Rama's mother
- Asrani as Narayan, Servant
- A. K. Hangal as Arvind , Ravi's maternal uncle
- Leela Mishra as Disha , Ravi's aunt
- Keshto Mukherjee as Tutor Gangu
- Vinod Khanna as Amit, Ravi's friend
- Paintal as Panditji, Astrologer
- Master Raju as Sanjay Roy, Rama's youngest brother

== Crew ==
- Director – Gulzar
- Producer – V.K. Sobti, Subhash Kapoor (associate)
- Production Manager – Kanti Bhai Pandya, Peerachand, Daulat Thakur
- Assistant Director – Pushpraj (chief), Chandrashekhar, Sajeev Kapoor, Meraj, Raj N. Sippy
- Cinematographer – K. Vaikunth
- Editor – Waman B. Bhosle, Gurudutt Shirali, Dilip Kotalgi (assistant)
- Art Director – Ajit Banerjee

== Soundtrack ==
All music was composed by Rahul Dev Burman and lyrics were penned by Gulzar. The song "Musafir Hoon Yaroon" was listed at #25 in the Binaca Geetmala annual list 1973 and is considered to be one of the most loved filmi songs of all time.

#	Title	Singer(s)	Duration	Raga
1	"Musafir Hoon Yaaro"	Kishore Kumar	4:40	
2	"Sa Re Ke Sa Re"	Kishore Kumar, Asha Bhosle	6:00	Alhaiya Bilawal
3	"Beeti Na Bitai Raina"	Lata Mangeshkar, Bhupinder	5:23	
4	"Mitwa Bole Meethe"	Bhupinder	3:19	
5	"Musafir Hoon Yaaro (Part 2)"	Kishore Kumar		

== Awards ==
Year	Nominee / work	Award	Result
1972	Lata Mangeshkar (for "Beeti Na Bitai Raina")	National Film Award for Best Female Playback Singer	Won
