= Soundarya (disambiguation) =

Soundarya was an Indian actress who worked predominantly in Telugu films.

Soundarya may also refer to:

== People ==
- Soundarya Bala Nandakumar, an Indian singer and actress
- Soundarya Jayamala, an Indian actress
- Soundarya Sharma, an Indian actress and model who works in Hindi films
- Saundarya Rajesh, an Indian social entrepreneur
- Soundarya Rajinikanth, an Indian film producer and director who primarily works in Tamil films

== Other uses ==
- Saundarya Lahari, a Sanskrit literary work by Adi Shankara

== See also ==
- Sundara (disambiguation)
