= Sundara Purushan =

Sundara Purushan (lit. 'Beautiful Man') may refer to:

- Sundara Purushan (1996 film), a 1996 Tamil film
- Sundara Purushan (2001 film), a 2001 Malayalam language film

== See also ==
- Sundara (disambiguation)
