= Jadu Bansha =

1974 Bengali film

- Directed by: Partha Pratim Chowdhury
- Written by: Partha Pratim Chowdhury
- Story by: Bimal Kar
- Produced by: Partha Pratim Chowdhury
- Starring: Uttam Kumar; Aparna Sen; Sharmila Tagore; Dhritiman Chatterjee; Santosh Dutta; Rabi Ghosh
- Cinematography: Krishna Chakraborty; Kanai Dey
- Edited by: Prashanta Dey
- Music by: Partha Pratim Chowdhury
- Production company: Montage Films
- Distributed by: Dawar Pictures & Distributors
- Release date: 29 March 1974
- Country: India
- Language: Bengali

Jadu Bansha is a Bengali-language political drama film directed by Partha Pratim Chowdhury based on a story of Bengali author Bimal Kar. The film was released in 1974 under the banner of Montage Films.

== Plot ==
The film revolves around the crisis of middle-class youth in post-independence Bengal. It reflects the period of the 1960s-’70s, rising the Naxal movement. Four unemployed friends lead aimless life. Their closest associate is Ganapati, whom they admire and trust. As the youths struggle with unemployment and moral confusion, their actions gradually lead to tragedy.

== Cast ==
- Uttam Kumar
- Sharmila Tagore
- Aparna Sen
- Dhritiman Chatterjee
- Rabi Ghosh
- Santosh Dutta
- Siddhartha Dutta
- Dulal Ghosh
- Mihir Pal
- Uday Bhattacharya
- Bapi Banerjee
