= Narbachi Wadi =

- Theatrical release poster
- नारबाची वाडी
- Directed by: Aditya Sarpotdar
- Screenplay by: Guru Thakur
- Based on: Shajjano Bagan by Manoj Mitra
- Produced by: FilmFarm India
- Starring: Dilip Prabhavalkar; Manoj Joshi (actor); Nikhil Ratnaparkhi; Kishori Shahane; Ambarish Deshpande; Vikas Kadam; Jyoti Malshe; Kamlakar Satpute; Bhalchandra Kadam; Atul Parchure; Suhas Shirsat
- Music by: Mangesh Dhadke
- Release date: 20 September 2013
- Running time: 120 minutes
- Country: India
- Language: Marathi

Narbachi Wadi is a 2013 Indian Marathi language movie directed by Aditya Sarpotdar. It is a remake of the 1980 Bengali film Banchharamer Bagaan.

== Plot ==
Set in 1946 in a village in Konkan, the movie starts off with a middle aged villager, Naroba (Dilip Prabhavalkar), watering his coconut trees in his grove with his grandson(Srujan Watve). The landlord of the village, Rangarao Khot (Manoj Joshi) is a flirtatious man and the antagonist. One day he halts his palanquin and gets off to follow a woman passing by, only to discover that she is trans. Shocked and embarrassed, he walks to a nearby coconut grove, and becomes bedazzled by its beauty; he instructs his servant to prepare the grove for a tamasha to be held that night. Naroba, had been working nearby approaches the landlord and declines giving up the grove which it was given to him by his father who had received it from the landlord's father himself for saving his father's life during a hunting trip. In a fit of rage, the landlord threatens Naroba to kill him in order to sign the contract transferring the ownership of the grove from Naroba to him. That night, as the landlord's crooks try to enter his house, he is saved by a gang of armed dacoits; their leader Sattu Ramoshi, (Kamlesh Sawant) later recognizes Naroba to be the person who nursed him when he was sick and starving. He swears to protect him from the landlord's actions, and warns the landlord to stay away from Naroba or face humiliation in front of the entire village. Horrified and abashed, the landlord staggers to his bedroom and locks himself in. He is found dead the next morning due to alcohol overdose.

The movie jumps to twenty years later when the landlord's son, Malhar (also played by Joshi), is in charge and decides to strategically lure Naroba into a contract which will ensure that the grove will be consigned to him after Naroba's death, fulfilling his father's wishes. To make the contract seem favorable to Naroba, he promises to pay him a monthly stipend of ₹ 150 (a considerable amount of money in those days) for as long as he lives. Although Naroba's health seems fragile, he is quite healthy and lives for 6 months after signing the contract; the landlord had expected him to die in a month. As more months go by, the landlord's financial situation exasperates and he so does his health. Naroba tells him that although he wants to die, Yama won't come to him; on hearing this the landlords offers him a bottle of rat poison which Naroba drinks, hoping to die. When the landlord reaches Naroba's house the next day to take him to his funeral, he is startled to see Naroba alive, and dies of a shock. As a condition of the contract, on his death, Naroba retains the ownership of his grove.

In the epilogue set eight years later, Naroba is shown with his great-grandson, Krishna. The movie ends with Naroba telling him that greed is dangerous and that it turns you into an ogre, referring to the father and son who died trying to acquire his land by force and by tact.

== Cast ==
- Dilip Prabhavalkar as Narba
- Manoj Joshi as Rangarao Khot / Malhari Khot
- Nikhil Ratnaparkhi as Berke
- Kishori Shahane as Renuka
- Ambarish Deshpande as Raghav Khot
- Vikas Kadam as Pandhari
- Jyoti Malshe as Kaminibala / Manju
- Kamlakar Satpute as Dadu Nhavi
- Bhalchandra Kadam as Dr. D'souza
- Atul Parchure as Dattoba Lingappa Kaikini
- Suhas Shirsat as Chor (Thief)
- Srujan Watve as Young Pandhari
- Vardhan Ajgaonkar as Krishna
- Kamlesh Sawant - Sattu Ramoshi

== Soundtrack ==
No.	Title	Singer(s)
1	"Gazal Khari Kay"	Mangesh Dhakde, Adarsh Shinde
2	"Shabay Shabay"	Mangesh Dhakde, Adarsh Shinde, Aanandi Joshi

== Reception ==
Aparna Phadke of The Times of India gave the movie a 3.5/5 rating, calling it "thoroughly enjoyable". She praised Aditya Sarpotdar for a "tight script that has just the right blend of emotions and humour".
