= Sundarakanda =

Sundarakanda or Sundara Kanda is the fifth book in the ancient Indian epic Ramayana.

Sundarakanda may also refer to these Indian films:

- Sundarakanda (1991 film), a Kannada film starring Shankar Nag
- Sundarakanda (1992 film), a Telugu film starring Daggubati Venkatesh and Meena
- Sundarakanda (2001 film), a Kannada film directed by M. S. Rajashekar
- Sundarakanda (2008 film), a Telugu film starring Allari Naresh and Charmy Kaur
- Sundarakanda (2025 film), a Telugu film of 2025

== See also ==
- Sundara (disambiguation)
- Sundara Kandam, a 1992 film
- Kanda (disambiguation)
