= Manoj Mitra =

Indian actor, director and playwright (1938–2024)

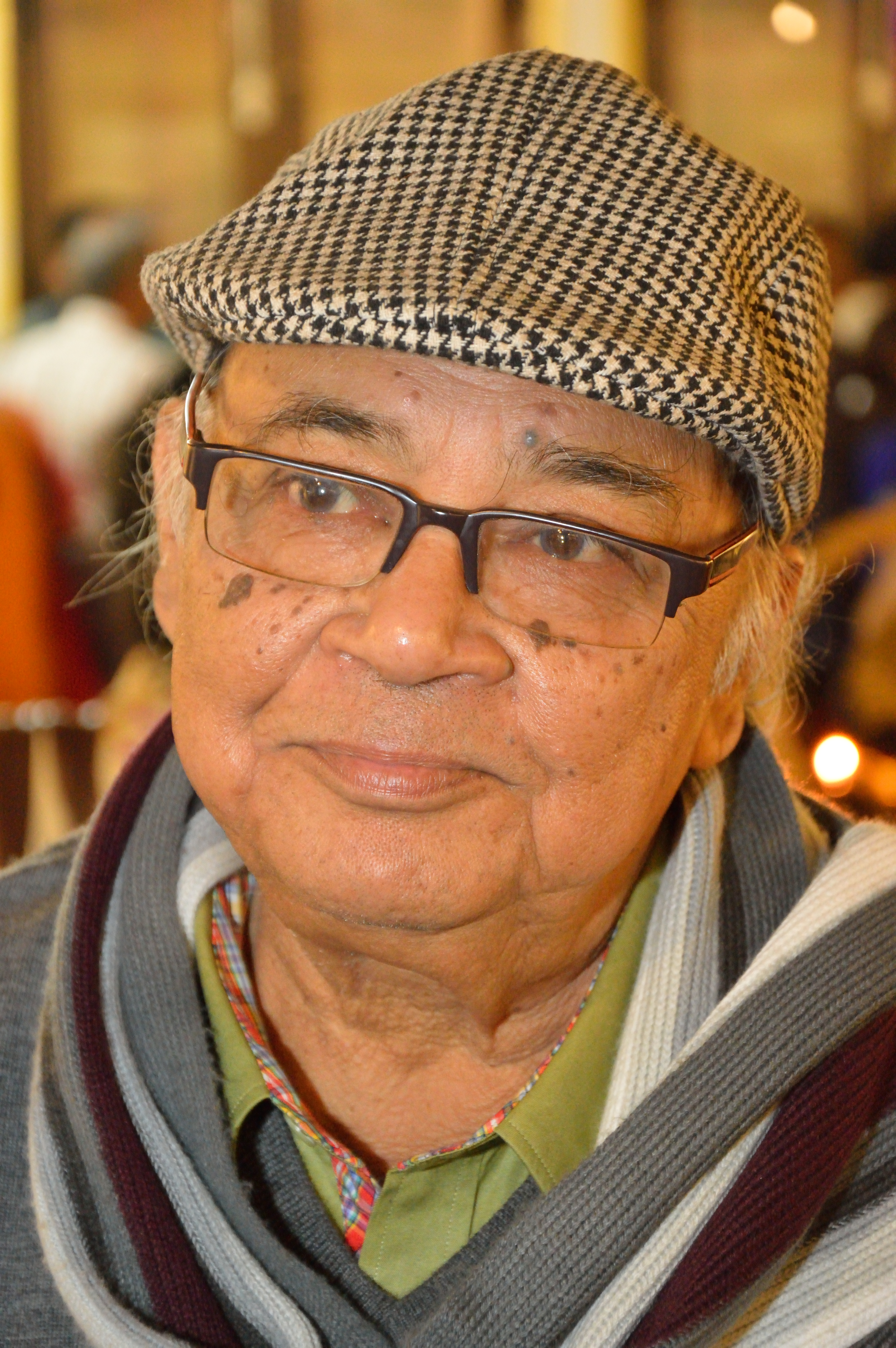
- Mitra in 2013
- Born: 22 December 1938; Dhulihar, Satkhira District, Khulna Division, Bengal Province, British India
- Died: 12 November 2024 (aged 85); Kolkata, West Bengal, India
- Occupations: Actor, Theatre Artist, Dramatist
- Known for: Theatre, acting
- Family: Amar Mitra (brother)

Manoj Mitra (22 December 1938 – 12 November 2024) was an Indian theatre, film and television actor, director, and playwright.

== Early life ==
Mitra was born on 22 December 1938 in Dhulihar village of Satkhira District, Khulna division. Initially he used to study at home because his father, Ashok Kumar Mitra, had a transferable job. Mitra was attracted to the Jatras and plays that used to be held in their courtyard during the Durga Pujas but was forbidden by senior family members to participate in any way. His school life began after the Partition at Dandirhat N.K.U.S. Niketan near Basirhat. Later he joined the Scottish Church College with honours in philosophy and graduated in 1958. He used to write short stories and many of them appeared in various magazines.

== Theatre career ==
It was at Scottish Church that he got initiated to theatre. There were regular shows at the college where the likes of Badal Sarkar, Rudraprasad Sengupta and others were students. He did his M.A. in philosophy from the University of Calcutta and began research for a doctorate. But by then he and friends like theatre and film director Partha Pratim Chowdhury had begun the group Sundaram. He began by teaching philosophy in the Suri Vidyasagar College (only one day) and later joined the drama department at the Rabindra Bharati University, where he became the head of department and retired as Sisirkumar Bhaduri professor of the University. But by then he was a leading playwright of West Bengal. He was writing, directing and acting in plays. He has written over a hundred plays like Sajano Bagaan, Chokhe Angul Dada, Kaalbihongo, Parabas, Alokanandar Putra Kanya, Narak Guljar, Aswathama, Chakbhanga Madhu, Mesh O Rakhash, Noisho Bhoj, Chhayar Prashad, Galpo Hekim Saheb, Rajdarshan, Debi Swarpamasta, Munni O Saat Chowkidar, Ranger haat, Ja Nei Bharatey. While most of these plays were produced by Sundaram, Bohurupee etc. He also played a soulful role in the movie "Hothat Bristy" (Sudden Rain) in 1998 produced by both Bangladesh & India. His works have been translated into many languages. Mitra has written several books on film and theatre.

He was the President of the Paschim Banga Natya Akademi from which he resigned citing health issues in August 2019.

== Career in film ==
Mitra acted in films by a diverse variety of directors such as Tapan Sinha, Satyajit Ray, Buddhadeb Dasgupta, Basu Chatterjee, Tarun Majumdar, Shakti Samanta and Goutam Ghose.

He is best known for the lead role in Tapan Sinha's film Banchharamer Bagan (based on Mitra's play Sajano Bagaan – The Arranged Garden) and his roles in Satyajit Ray's Ghare Baire and Ganashatru. He played comedic and antagonist roles in hundreds of Bengali movies.

Selected Filmography: Banchharamer Bagaan, 1980 Adalat O Ekti Meye (1982) Ghare Baire (film), (1984) Shatru (1984 film) Baidurya Rahasya, (1985) Atanka, (1986) Damu (film), (1996) Lathi (1996) Dui Prithibi (2010 film) Uma (2018) Manojder Adbhut Bari(2018).

== Death ==
Mitra died on 12 November 2024, at the age of 85.

== Awards and honours ==
- Sangeet Natak Akademy Award for Best Playwright (1985)
- Calcutta University Award for Best Playwright (1986)
- West Bengal State Government Award for Best Playwright (1983 & 1989)
- Asiatic Society's Gold Medal (2005)
- Filmfare Award East for Best Actor (1980)
- Munir Chowdhury Award from Bangladesh Theatre Society (2011)
- Dinabandhu Puraskar (25 May 2012)
- Kalakar Awards
