= Shankar Narayan Bank =

1956 film

- Directed by: Niren Lahiri
- Starring: Chhabi Biswas; Kaberi Bose; Chhaya Devi; Uttam Kumar; Vasant Choudhury; Anubha Gupta; Anup Kumar
- Music by: Anupam Ghatak
- Production company: Sunrise Films
- Distributed by: Nandan Pictures
- Release date: 1 June 1956
- Country: India
- Language: Bengali

Shankar Narayan Bank is a 1956 Bengali film directed by Niren Lahiri. This is a drama film which stars Chhabi Biswas Kaberi Bose, Chhaya Devi, Vasant Choudhury, Anubha Gupta, Anup Kumar and Uttam Kumar in the lead roles. This film was produced by Sunrise Films and distributed under the banner of Nandan Pictures.

== Cast ==
- Chhabi Biswas
- Kaberi Bose
- Chhaya Devi
- Uttam Kumar
- Vasant Choudhury
- Anubha Gupta
- Anup Kumar
- Nilima Das

== Music ==
- "Etodin Por Tomaro Roth" - Sandhya Mukherjee
