= Shree Shree Mahalaxmi Puja =

- Directed by: Biswanath Nayak
- Produced by: Krushna Chandra Tripathy Sharma
- Starring: Jharana Das; Sarat Pujari; Anubha Gupta; Bauribandhu
- Music by: Nachiketa Ghosh
- Release date: 1959
- Country: India
- Language: Odia

Shree Shree Mahalaxmi Puja is a 1959 Indian Odia mythological film directed by Biswanath Nayak. This is debut film of Sarat Pujari. The tale of Goddess Laxmi leaving the temple to teach brothers Lord Jagannath and Lord Balabhadra, a lesson, was presented in the movie.

== Cast ==
- Sarat Pujari
- Jharana Das
- Anubha Gupta
- Bauribandhu
- Shefali
- Srikant

== Soundtrack ==
1. "Mora Mana Sina Kehi Jane-na"
2. "Aji Kartika Punei Dina Re Majhi Kata Mari"
3. "Jaya Tu Maha Lakhmi Jaya Tu Ma"
4. "Kete Maja E Dunia Bhai Maja"
5. "Ananta Akashe Aganita Taraka"
