= Partha Pratim Chowdhury =

- Born: 1938
- Died: 1996 (aged 57–58)
- Occupations: Actor, director, writer, cinematographer, dramatist and music director

Partha Pratim Chowdhury (1938—1996) was an Indian Bengali actor, director, screen writer, dramatist and music director. He was widely appreciated as a director for Chaya Surya (1963) and Jadubansha (1974).

== Early years and education ==
He studied at the Scottish Church College of the University of Calcutta. Along with other future luminaries of the Bengali theatre, Badal Sircar, Rudraprasad Sengupta, and Manoj Mitra, among others, he was initiated into the theatre world during his college years.

== Career ==
He started a theatre group Sundaram in 1957. Later he moved on to filmmaking.

== Filmography ==
Year	Title	Actor	Director	Assistant director	Writer	Cinematographer	Music director	Producer	Ref
1959	Deep Jwele Jaai			Yes					
1959	Indranath Srikanta O Annadadidi	Yes							
1963	Chhaya Surya		Yes		Yes				
1965	Subha O Debatar Gras		Yes						
1965	Dolna		Yes						
1968	Hangsa-Mithun		Yes		Yes				
1969	Parineeta				Yes				
1974	Jadu Bansha		Yes		Yes			Yes	
1978	Subho Kemon Achho		Yes						
1982	Rajbabhu	Yes	Yes		Yes	Yes	Yes		
1982	Troyee				Yes				
1983	Chena Achena							Yes	
1984	Pujarini		Yes		Yes	Yes	Yes		
	Sargam						Yes		
