= Hrad (film) =

1955 Bengali film

- Directed by: Ardhendu Sen
- Written by: Bimal Kar
- Screenplay by: Ardhendu Sen (Dialogues also)
- Based on: Hrad by Bimal Kar
- Produced by: Rupamaya
- Starring: Sandhyarani; Uttam Kumar; Chhabi Biswas; Asit Baran
- Cinematography: Santosh Guha Roy
- Edited by: Shib Bhattachariya
- Music by: Manabendra Mukherjee
- Production company: Rupamaya Films
- Distributed by: Filmsharani
- Release date: 29 July 1955
- Running time: 97 minutes
- Country: India
- Language: Bengali

Hrad (The Lake) is a Bengali drama film directed by Ardhendu Sen. The film stars Uttam Kumar, Sandhyarani, Chhabi Biswas, Asit Baran. This film was released on 29 July 1955 under the banner of Rupmaya films. The story was based on Bimal Kar's novel of same name. The film showed Uttam's one of the most different and critical character, where he played a memory loss patient and gave one of the finest performances of his entire career. Uttam received for the first time BFJA Best Actor Award in his career. The famous music composer Manabendra Mukhopadhyay was the music director of the film. This was a mental health and a psychological treatment film. The film became huge successful at the box office.

The film is one of the earlier psychological film. The plot based on a man who is mentally asylum where he has forgotten slices of his life and behaves in a way that make people feel he is mad. The doctor however, does not agree and treats him with gentle kindness.

The film received overwhelming response from critics and audiences. Mainly praised on Uttam Kumar performance. This film reached Kumar on a new height. The film become blockbuster hit at the box office.

== Plot ==
Uttam Kumar is in a mental asylum where he has forgotten slices of his life and behaves in a way that makes people feel he is mad. The doctor however, does not agree and treats him with gentle kindness. However, the novel was better than the film.

== Cast ==
- Uttam Kumar
- Chhabi Biswas
- Jahor Roy
- Sandhyarani
- Asit Baran
- Tarun Kumar Chatterjee
- Premangshu Bose
- Sital Bandopadhyay
- Ashu Bose
- Suprabha Mukhopadhyay

== Soundtrack ==
Hrad

Soundtrack album by Manabendra Mukherjee
- Released: 1955
- Recorded: 1954
- Studio: Rupamaya Films
- Genre: Feature film soundtrack
- Length: 0:06:22
- Label: Jio Savan
- Producer: Rupamaya

Manabendra Mukherjee chronology
Saajher Pradip (1955)	Hrad (1955)	Duttak (1955)

All lyrics are written by Shyamal Gupta; all music is composed by Manabendra Mukherjee.

Songs
No.	Title	Playback	Length
1.	"Bansari Baje"	Manabendra Mukherjee
2.	"Chand Dube Gele"	Pratima Banerjee, Mira Dasgupta
Total length:			6:22

== Release and Reception ==
This film was highlighted mainly for Uttam Kumar. His performance as a mental asylum the heart of the film. This is totally an psychological treatment. The popular daily newspaper and media stated that time The performance in Hrad is the best ever of Uttam entire artistic career. Many critics also said that Uttam Kumar's acting performance as equal as Gregory Peck. The film gave Kumar a new height.

The film initially released at Darpana, Chaya, Purna theater. During the film release Kumar's others two film Shapmochon and Bidhilipi also running successfully. This film too become blockbuster at the box office. On this time Kumar become one and only box office sensation in Bengal.

== Award ==
BFJA Award 1955

- 1955 - BFJA Best Actor - Uttam Kumar
