= Sundaram (theatre group) =

Bengali theatre group

- Formation: 1957
- Type: Theatre group
- Location: Kolkata, West Bengal, India
- Artistic director: Manoj Mitra

Sundaram is a Bengali theatre group, established in 1957. They have staged more than 40 productions like Fingerprint, Char Dewalergolpo, Parabas, Sajano Bagan, and Alokanandar Putra Kanya.

Bengali stage and film director Partha Pratim Chowdhury started the group. It was later carried on by writer and actor Manoj Mitra. The group was founded in 1994. Sundaram celebrated its 61st birthday on August 15, 2018, when it had performed over 700 shows globally.

== Productions ==
- Alokanandar Putra Kanya
- Finger-Print
- Galpo Hekim Saheb
- Ja Nei Bharatey.
- Kancha
- Mesh-O-Rakshash
- Mrityur Chokhe Jal.
- Parabas
- Sajano Bagan
- Shovajatra

== Awards ==
- Alokanandar Putra Kanya won Siromani Purashkar presented by Asian Paints. Lead actress of this play also was awarded the Best Actress Award by the West Bengal State Natya Academy in the year 1990.
- Galpo Hekim Saheb also won Siromani Purashkar from Asian Paints in 1995.
