= Prabhavathi Devi Saraswathi =

Indian Bengali writer and novelist

Prabhabati Devi Saraswati (5 March 1905 - 14 May 1972) was an Indian Bengali writer and novelist.

== Early life ==
Prabhabati was born in 1905 in Khantura, Gobardanga, North 24 Parganas district, West Bengal, British India. Her father was Gopalchandra Bandyopadhyay. He was a lawyer based in Dinajpur, East Bengal. She married Bibhutibhushan Chowdhury when she was nine years old. She studied at the Brahma Girls' Training College, where she trained to be a teacher.

== Career ==
Prabhavathi joined the Calcutta City Corporation School as a teacher. She founded the Savitri School in North Kolkata. She wrote in journals such as The Mohammadi, Bharatvarsa, Upasana, Banshri, and Sarathi, among others. In 1923 she published her first novel, Bijita. Her novel was made into a Bengali movie, Bhanga Gora. It was also made into a 1956 Tamil-language movie called Kula Dheivam and a 1957 Hindi-language film called Bhabhi. The play Banglar Meye was based on her book, Pather Shese. She wrote more than 300 books. She created the first lady detective named Krishna in Bengali literature. Her notable works include Bratacharini, Byathita Dharitri, Bidhabar Katha, Dhular Dharani, Jagaran, Mahiyasi Nari, and Rabga Bau. She was a director of the Jamsedpur All India Bengali Literary Society. In 1946 she was awarded the Leela Award by the University of Calcutta. She was awarded Saraswati by the Navadwip Scholars Society.

== Death ==
Prabhavathi died on 14 May 1972 in Kolkata, West Bengal, India.
