= M. S. Sundara Rajan =

Indian economist (born 1950)

M.S.Sundara Rajan
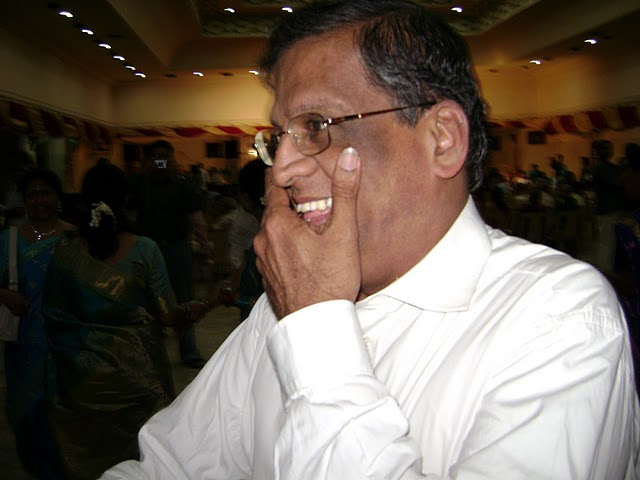
- Born: Mittur Swaminathan Sundara Rajan; 8 March 1950 (age 76); Chennai, India
- Other names: Soundara rajan, Sundarajan, Sondarajan, Soundararajan
- Education: MCom, ACS, CAIIB
- Alma mater: Ramakrishna Mission Vivekananda College
- Occupation: Banking consultant
- Known for: Banking and economic reforms
- Height: 5 ft 10 in (178 cm)
- Predecessor: Dr. K.C.Chakraborty
- Successor: T.M.Bashin
- Spouse: Lalitha Sundara Rajan
- Children: 2
- Awards: Economic Times – 45 Most Powerful CEO in India

Contributions of Sundara Rajan
- top 500 Global Financial Brands 2009: Brand Finance Plc rated Indian Bank as amongst the top 500 Global Financial Brands in year 2009
- Statement of Intent (SOI): Indian Bank achieves SOI consistently for first time
- BEST NATIONALISED BANK by Financial Express: Indian Bank awarded best Nationalised bank by Financial Express for 2007–08
- Brand Equity Most Trusted Brand: Indian Bank wins Brand Equity consistently during tenure. Continues to be the most trusted brand
- BBB (-) long term and A-3 short term counterparty rating: Indian Bank gets rated for the first time. Garners immense appreciation for this achievement
- Skotch Challenger Award-2008: Path breaking financial inclusion initiatives in Pondicherry and Dharavi in banking sector
- Top 500 Companies 2008 – Dun & Bradstreet's India's Top 500 Companies: Indian Bank features at 19th slot for the first time.
- Over 300 branches and 350 ATM's opened in 3 years span: Indian Bank creates a history by opening 300 branches and 350 ATM's in a span of 3 years
- Pioneering Biometric ATM: Indian Bank pioneers Biometric ATM for the first time
- Introduction of Mobile Bankers: Bank approaches customers – 20 branches opened
- Introduction of Exclusive Micro Credit Branches: Bank has exclusive micro credit branches
- Celent Model Bank – 2009: Indian Bank gets technology innovation awards for revolutionary implementation of Core Banking System
- KPMG Ranks Indian Bank as the 6th Largest Bank in India: For year 2009, Indian Bank is ranked 6th in the top big 10 banks
- Economic Times-Intelligence Group study rates Indian Bank as amongst the best banks in India: In areas of Growth, Efficiency, Financial strength, Shareholder returns, Indian Bank was ranked the best

M. S. Sundara Rajan (Tamil: ம்.ச்.சுந்தரராஜன)் (born 8 March 1950), is an Indian banking consultant, economist and was previously the head of Indian Bank. Rajan is a M.A. (Econ), CAIIB and A.C.S. He is a visiting faculty to many institutions. His core expertise is in investment banking, project finance, corporate restructuring and capital market. Rajan is known to be a soft-spoken and polite person. Rajan has visited Singapore, London, Tokyo, Hong Kong, New York & Dubai on business engagements. Rajan is an ardent Caranatic Music Fan and can speak in over five languages.

Rajan won the Golden Peacock Award on behalf of Indian Bank in October 2009. He has been part of several key strategic initiatives at Indian Bank including launching of initial IPO, introduction of Biometric ATM and introduction of touch screen kiosk across various Indian bank branches in India.

According to The Economic Times press release, Rajan was ranked 45th in the Economic Times India Inc's most powerful CEOs list (2009). He was ranked No.2 among the CEOs of Nationalized Banks and No.6 among the CEOs of Commercial banks. During his leadership, Indian Bank received Golden peacock National Training Award for the year 2009 presented at a special awards function on 9 October 2009 at London during the 10th International conference on Corporate Governance.It was during his tenure that Indian Bank appeared first in featured in the list of Forbes 2000–2009 (1659th position). Rajan was also pivotal in setting up Dharavi's first bank, a place that has over Rs. 1000 billion of market potential.

On 31 May 2010, Rajan was appointed as a member to look into customer service for banks by RBI.

In March 2013 he was appointed as the Chairman of Institute of Directors – Tamil Nadu state Chapter

== Education and early life ==
Born in Chennai, Tamil Nadu, Sundara Rajan did his school at the prestigious P. S. Senior Secondary School, Chennai. He is an alumnus of one of Chennai's finest colleges, the Ramakrishna Mission Vivekananda College in Mylapore, Chennai. Rajan joined the Indian Bank in early 1970s. He soon quit Indian Bank and joined Union Bank of India.

== Career ==
=== Early career ===
Rajan built his career in Union Bank of India where he started off as a probationary officer and rose to the rank of general manager. Sundara Rajan is seen as a major contributor to the banking industry with his core inclination towards credit. After joining Union Bank his first posting was at Coimbatore, where he worked as an officer for a span of two years. Soon, he was promoted and transferred to Nagamam in Tamil Nadu, where he headed the branch. Within a span of one year, he was transferred to Bangalore staff training college, Union Bank's training facility. He was a member of the Faculty of Union Bank Staff Training establishment at Bangalore for nearly seven years after exposure at field level from 1972 to 1981. Soon thereafter, he was posted to the Zonal Office of the bank. Union Bank's Zonal Office was going through a challenging phase being amongst the pioneers to introduce credit cards in India. With his previous credit experience, Rajan was put in charge of overseeing the initial phase of issuing over 30,000+ credit cards. The outcome was a success and the bank awarded him a new role at Union Bank's Zonal office in Chennai.

=== Later career ===
In mid 1990s, the Indian industries experienced a significant growth and new government reforms like liberalisation were introduced to help these industries grow further. Union Bank's Top Management were working on a proposal to create a branch which could exclusively cater to the industry's needs. The outcome of this was the Industrial Finance Branch. Rajan joined the branch as the Chief Manager in 1994. With his team of 100 employees, the Industrial finance branch (IFB) made an impact in the industrial markets of Mumbai by generating larger than expected revenues. Shortly thereafter, Rajan was promoted again. He was transferred to New Delhi as the head of the Delhi's Industrial Finance Branch. He was later brought back to Mumbai and soon, promoted to general manager at Mumbai Zonal office. He was a nominee of Union Bank of India on the Board of Dewan Housing Finance Corporation Ltd for nearly two years.

=== Indian Bank ===
Subsequently, he joined Indian Bank as executive director in April 2006 and was Director on the Boards of M/s. Indbank Merchant Banking Services Ltd., M/s IndBank Housing Ltd., and M/s Indfund Management Ltd. – all subsidiaries on Indian Bank from April 2006 to 3 June 2007. Credit appraisal is said to be one of his main fortes. Rajan assumed charge of the Indian Bank on 3 June 2007 as the chairman and managing director. Rajan was a member of the Committee on Agro Business of Indian Banks' Association. He was Member of the Committee on Diploma in Banking & Finance and Junior Associate in Indian Institute of Banking & Finance, Mumbai (IIBF). Rajan was also a Director in United India Insurance Company Ltd and actively contributed in the board deliberations.

== Thoughts, influences and contributions ==
=== Thoughts and influence ===
Rajan is a self-avowed "Task and People Oriented Leadership", referring to the philosophy developed by management Gurus Robert R. Blake and Jane Mouton. Rajan trademark was his liking for customers and employees.

Rajan is an avid academic. His interest towards academia in India has seen him being the visiting faculty for many events including Liba & MOP Viashnav

=== Contributions ===
During his tenure at Indian Bank, Rajan played a pivotal role in assisting the bank to enter the stock market (Bombay Stock Exchange BSE) and filed its draft in the red herring prospectus (DRHP) with the Securities and Exchange Board of India (SEBI) on 1 December 2006 with a proposal to enter the capital market with its initial public offering of equity shares. Sundara Rajan was also instrumental in setting up Dharavi first bank within the "heart of Dharavi". Lakhs of migrants who run thousands of tiny businesses there send Rs 3,000–40 billion every year to hometowns in Tamil Nadu and other parts of India. Indian Bank thanks to its strong network in Tamil Nadu will allow its customers to benefit deeply. On 2 April 2009, according to The Economic Times press release, Rajan is amongst the top 50 most powerful CEO's and amongst the top 20 professional CEO's in India.

== Personal life ==
Rajan and his family were featured on Indian National Television, Doordarshan under a show called "Vetrikku Pennal". The show focused on the life of Indian Bank CMD. Rajan lives in Chennai and is a Hindu. He is married to Lalitha, who is a native of Chennai. He has two kids, Arvind and Lakshmi. Rajan is an avid music listener. He is also a sports enthusiast. Rajan's wife, Lalitha has done her Post graduate in science from Mysore University . She was previously employed with Deloitte and is currently a home-maker. In the show, Lalitha had quoted that Rajan is an extremely positive human being and likes to take on challenges. The show was aired on 14 November 2009 (8:30 PM). Due to public demand and rise of Television Rating Point, it was re-aired on 16 November 2009 (3:00 PM) and on 22 November 2009 (6:00 PM). Rajan was recently spotted on bankconsultants website.

Business positions
Preceded by Dr K.C.Chakraborty	M.S.Sundara Rajan Chairman and Managing Director of Indian Bank; 2007–31 March 2010
