= Manabendra Mukhopadhyay =

Indian vocalist known for vocal music

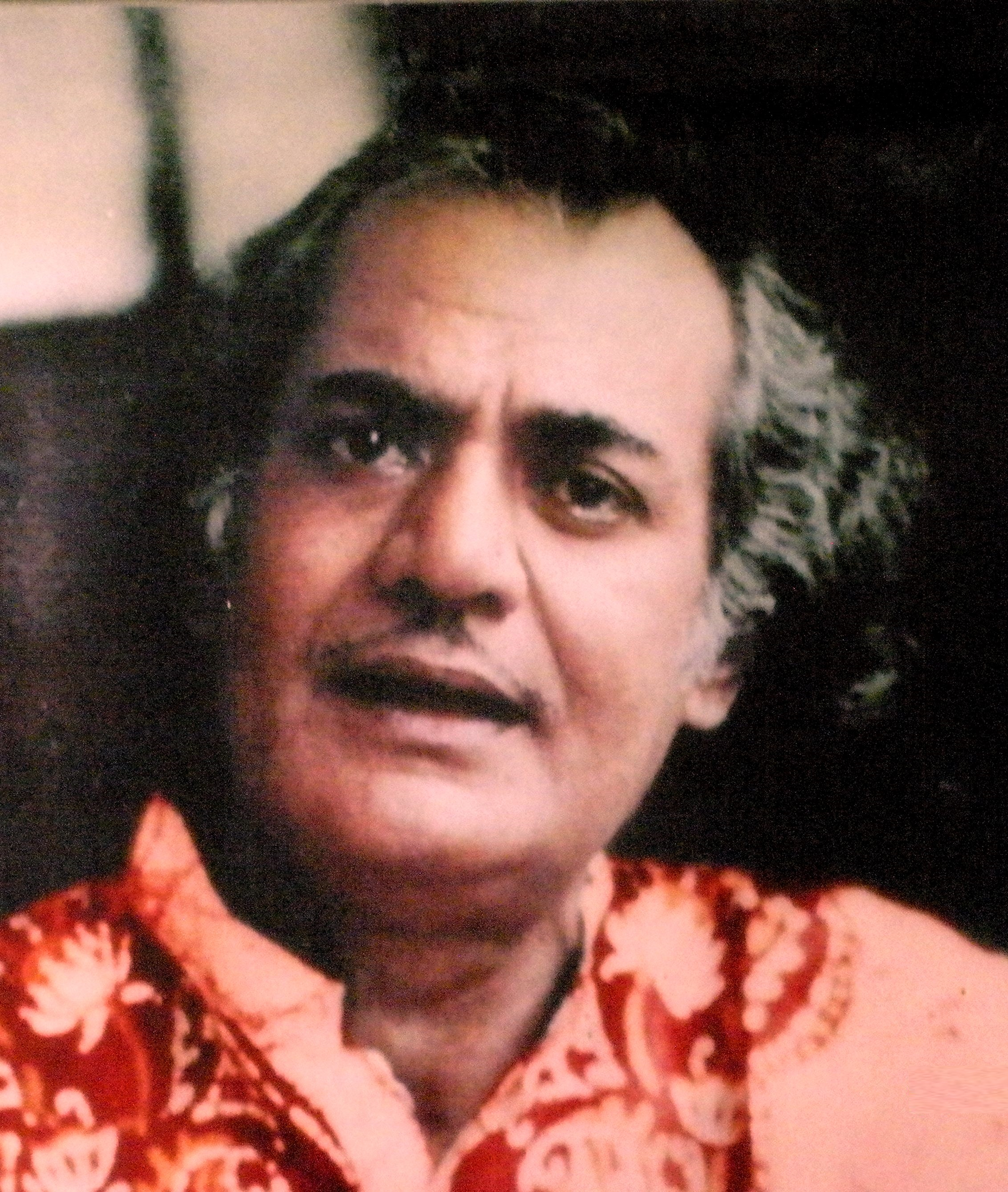

Background information
- Born: 11 August 1928; Kalighat, Calcutta, British India
- Died: 19 January 1992 (aged 63) Kolkata, West Bengal, India
- Occupation: Singer
- Instrument: Vocals

Lyricist Shyamal Gupta, composer and singer Manabendra Mukhopadhyay

Manabendra Mukhopadhyay was an Indian singer and music composer in Bengali films. Coming to limelight in the early 1950s Manabendra was an innovative and stylish singer who had a strong foundation in Indian classical music. With his distinctive voice, Manabendra was an instant hit with the audience. demonstrating great talent also as a composer, using the lyrics and melody of a song with good effect. At that time Bengali modern song world had the presence of some outstanding performers like Dhananjay Bhattacharya, Manna Dey, Satinath Mukherjee, Akhilbandhu Ghosh, Kishore Kumar, Shyamal Mitra, Hemanta Mukhopadhyay to name a few.

It is considered that during the 1950s, 1960s and 1970s the Bengali modern songs reached their peak and that period is usually called the "Golden age of Bengali Adhunik Songs". At that time Bengal had a unique mix of singers which inspired composers and lyricists to create innumerable treasure of creative music. Each singer had their own inimitable style, and compositions were made to match their individual ability. Bengali non-film modern songs were in fact as popular, if not more, than film songs which also reached a level of popularity in the 1950s and 1960s.

== Early music career ==
He started his music lesson from his uncle Ratneshwar Mukherjee. Being inspired by uncle Sidheshwar Mukherjee and Ratneswar Mukherjee, Manabendra impressed the listeners with his first basic disc in 1953, titled Nai Chondon Lekha Sriradhar Chokhe Nai Nai Shyamo Rai. He released his two records named ’Phire Dekho Na’ and ‘Janina Tumi Kothay’ in association with His Master's Voice. The lyrics were written by Sidheshwar Mukhopadhyay. It was based on Keertan Andaz, and Manabendra was trained towards Keertans, Bhajans and Bhaktigeeti from the very early childhood. His uncles were trained classical experts and mainly due to their influence he came into the world of music. A number of his songs began to hit the airwaves including the romantic 'Emni Kore Porbe Mone' (lyrics by Shyamal Gupta), and semi-classically bent 'Ghumayona Saheli Go'. Within a short span, Manabendra drew the attention of the erstwhile leading music composers of Bengal, namely Salil Chowdhury, Sudhin Dasgupta, Robin Chatterjee, Anol Chatterjee, Nachiketa Ghosh, Prabir Majumdar, Jnan Prakash Ghosh, Abhijit Banerjee, and others. His successful songs include 'Ami Parini Bujhite Parini' and 'Jodi Jante' composed by Salil Chowdhury, 'Mayur Konthi Ratero Nile' and 'Tari Churite Je Rekhechhi Mon Shona Kore' by Sudhin Dasgupta, 'Jodi Amake Dekho Tumi Udashi' and 'Sei Chokh Kothai Tomar' by Abhijit Banerjee, 'Ei neel nirjan sagore' by Prabir Majumdar, 'Birohini Chiro Birohini' by Himangshu Dutta, 'Bone Noy Mone Mor', 'Aha Na Roy Na' by Nachiketa Ghosh, 'Tomar Pother Prante Moner Monideep Jwele Rekhechi' and 'Tumi Phiraye Diyechho Bole' by Satinath Mukherjee. He also sung the iconic song from Pankaj Mullick's 'Mahisasuramardini', 'Taba Achintya Rupo Charita Mahima', a song which remains timeless even after 9 decades of its creation, praising the divine mother Durga.

His own compositions also continued to grab the attention of audience like 'Ami Eto Je Tomai Bhalobesechhi', 'Sei Bhalo Ei Basanta Noi' (1960) 'Rimjhim Baje Manjira Kar', 'Kato Asha Niye Tumi Esechhile', etc. The former became a huge hit and is cherished by audience even today. The proof of this is in the fact that many audio compilations from His Master's Voice still includes this song and it is played by many radio stations.

Manabendra Mukhopadhyay was also a great scholar in the songs of Kazi Nazrul Islam. He trained himself not only being inspired by his uncles, but he had a great enthusiasm also in Nazrul's songs being trained from Angurbala Devi, Indubala Devi, who were directly schooled in Nazrul's songs from Kazida in 1929–1942. Manabendra was the first man who scored in his disc record of Nazrul's songs as Nazrulgeeti in the mid-1960s. Much of the Nazrulgeeti, mainly based on the basic Indian raagas in classical touch, like 'Bagichay Bulbuli Tui', 'Musafeer Mochh Re Ankhi Jol', 'Akul Holi Keno', 'Britha Tui Kahar Pare', 'Aamar Nayone Krishno Nayantara', 'Arunkanti Ke Go', was sung by him. Manabendra received immense popularity from singing Nazrulgeeti.

== Film career ==
Manabendra made a debut in the film arena by becoming the music director for Uttam Kumar's film Chapadangar Bou (1954), where the songs were written by eminent writer Tarashankar Bandopadhyay. Before this, he did a cameo in Uttam Kumar starrer film Sharey Chuattor and also sang a song ('Amar E Jouban') in it. In Chapadangar Bou, Manabendra brought in the flavour of Mahadev's Gajon, that are sung in villages in Bengal with the song 'Shibo He Shibo He'. According to Manabendra (in an old television interview) he gave his audition as a music director at Tarashankar's house as the writer wanted to hear the tunes. The song mentioned earlier was composed at his house on spot.

In 1958, Robin Chattopadhyay composed music for a film titled Lalu Bhulu, the story of two handicapped boys. The film was highly successful in Bengal and Manabendra sang these songs with great efficiency. 'Jar Hiya Akasher Nil Nilimay', 'Dukho Amar Shesh Kore Dao Probhu', 'Surjo Tomar Sonaar Toron Kholo', 'Dukher Pothe Naai Jodi', 'Ei Pran Jharona Jaglo'. The lyrics were penned by Sailen Ray.

In another film Nilachale Mahaprabhu celebrated composer Raichand Boral invited him to sing kirtans of Lord Chaitanya and the song 'Jagannath Jagat Bandhu' made the audiences spellbound. However, Manabendra credits a song in 'Nabajanma' — 'Ore Mon Majhi' to be his first hit in films.

Manabendra himself composed music in a number of Bengali films including Mayamrigo (1960), Badhu (1962), Jato Mat Tato Path, Joy Jayanti (1970), Godhuli Belay (1965), Sudur Niharika (1976), etc. Due to Manabendra's classical potential, composers showed the courage of composing pure classical numbers in Bengali films like Sajani Bina Re Rajani Na Jay by Anil Bagchi in the film Shashibabur Sangsar (1960), Andhare by Jnan Prakash Ghosh in the film Basanta Bahar (1958).

== Later years ==
In the 1970s also, Manabendra had sung notable songs like 'Ei Ganga Ei Padda' (1970), ‘Halka Megher Palki', 'Hajar Jonom Dhore', 'Oi Moushumi Mon Shudhu Rong Bodlai', etc. In the 1980s Manabendra concentrated on Nazrulgeeti and 'Bag Bajarer Gaan' and there also emerged as a winner. However, he took the liberty to alter the tunes of many Nazrul songs; in part due to his beautiful classical rendering, many of them gradually became more popular than Nazrul's original. Manabendra Mukherjee's songs in 'Bagbajarer Gaan' include the creations of late eighteenth century written by Bhola Moira, Khirodprasad Vidyavinod, Girish Chandra Ghosh, Amrita Lal Basu, etc., titled "Bagbajarer Sidheswarir Annopurnar Ghat", "Bandhona Torikhani", "Jai Go Oi Bajaye Bnashi Pran Kemon Kore", "Ki Diye Pujibo Bolo Ki Achhe Amar", etc. He portrayed the style of singing that used to be exhibited 100 years back at the shore of Ganges in Kolkata. The songs show the other dimension of Manabendra Mukherjee.

He died on 19 January 1992. According to many, Manabendra Mukhopadhyay did not get the recognition he deserved which happened to a number of classical singers during the golden age.

== Personal life ==
He was married to Bela Mukhopadhyay. Their daughter Manasi Mukhopadhyay is also a singer. She was born in the year 1966.

== Filmography ==
- Aguner Phulki (1976)
- Anustup Chhanda (1964)
- Bodhu (1962)
- Champadangar Bou (1954)
- Dattak (1955)
- Debi Choudhrani (1974)
- Dhular Dharani (1956)
- Godhuli Bela (1965)
- Hrad (film) (1955)
- Indira (2000)
- Jato Mat Tato Path (1979)
- Joyjayanti (1971)
- Kalo Chokher Tara (1980)
- Kalsrot (1964)
- Kashtipathar (1964)
- Maa (1961)
- Mani-Aar-Manik (1954)
- Maya Mriga (1960)
- Mukhujye Paribar (1965)
- Nishkriti (1978)
- Pati Sangshodhani Samiti (1965)
- Rakta Palash (1962)
- Sachimar Sansar (1971)
- Sanjher Pradeep (1955)
- Shubhoddristi (1962)
- Sudur Niharika (1975)
- Uttar Purush (1966)
