= Hansuli Banker Upakatha (novel) =

1951 novel by Tarashankar Bandopadhyay

- Author: Tarashankar Bandopadhyay
- Translator: Ben Conisbee Baer
- Language: Bangla
- Genre: Novel
- Published: 1951; 75 years ago
- Publication place: India

Hansuli Banker Upakatha (Bengali: হাঁসুলীবাঁকের উপকথা, lit. 'Hansuli Bank's Fable') is a 1951 novel by Tarashankar Bandopadhyay, set in 1941. The novel explores life in rural Bengal, the realities of the Zamindari system that was responsible for much of the social inequalities in Bengal, as well as the changes in social perceptions with time.

The novel was written and published in various versions between 1946 and 1951. In 1946, it was first appeared in a shorter version in a special annual Durga festival issue of Anandabazar Patrika. Later, the novel was expanded and revised over the following five years, appearing in several editions during that time.

The novel was translated into English as The Tale of Hansuli Turn by Ben Conisbee Baer, published 2011.

== Plot summary ==
The story is set in a secluded village in West Bengal, home to the Kahar people. They inhabit a settlement at Hansuli Bank, a crescent-shaped turn in the Kopai River, and live a life dictated by ancient customs and superstitions. Their community is led by a council of elders, with the deeply traditional Bonwari as its headman. The Kahars believe their fate is intertwined with the spirits of the land and the river, and their days are governed by omens and rituals. The narrative opens as a sense of unease settles over the community. The central conflict is established between the old guard, represented by Bonwari, and the defiant younger generation, personified by the rebellious Karali. A pivotal early scene involves the appearance of a black snake; while the elders see it as a divine manifestation, Karali shocks them by killing it, showcasing his contempt for their beliefs. This clash intensifies as the outside world intrudes. The construction of a nearby railway line and a British-run factory introduces forces that the Kahars cannot comprehend. The shriek of a steam engine is mistaken for a wailing ghost, throwing the village into a panic and highlighting their isolation. Karali, who takes a job with the railway, becomes a symbol of this encroaching new world. He is drawn to the promise of a life beyond the rigid caste structure and poverty of Hansuli Bank. His illicit love affair with a young Kahar woman named Pakhi directly challenges the community's moral code and leads to a dramatic confrontation with Bonwari and the village council. The tension between Bonwari and Karali splits the community, creating a deep rift between those who cling to tradition and those who see a future elsewhere. The novel's turning point is a catastrophic flood. The Kopai River, the lifeblood of the Kahar village, swells its banks and inundates their settlement. The flood washes away their homes and livelihoods, shattering their belief that their deities and rituals can protect them. This disaster acts as the final catalyst for the community's disintegration. In the aftermath, the social fabric of Hansuli Bank is irrevocably broken. Displaced and desperate, many of the younger Kahars, led by Karali's example, abandon their ancestral home to seek work in the factory. This migration represents a final, painful severance from their land and their identity. The novel closes on a poignant and somber note, with Bonwari reflecting on the loss of his community and its way of life. The old folk songs and rituals have faded, replaced by the relentless sound of the factory whistle, a symbol of an old world giving way to the new.

== Adaptation ==
Hasuli Banker Upakatha (film) was made in 1962 by Tapan Sinha based on this novel.
