= Anubha Gupta =

Indian actress (1929/1930–1972)

- Born: Mridula Gupta; 27 December 1929; British Raj
- Died: 14 January 1972 (aged 42); Kolkata
- Education: Parry Charan Girls School Shantiniketan
- Occupations: Actress; singer
- Years active: 1944–1972
- Spouse: Rabi Ghosh

Anubha Gupta (27 December 1929 – 14 January 1972) was an Indian Bengali actress and singer who is known for her work in Bengali cinema. She received the Best Actress in Supporting Role Award at the 26th Annual BFJA Awards for the film Hansuli Banker Upakatha.

== Early life ==
Anubha Gupta was born in 1929 in Dinajpur, British Raj though it has also been suggested that she was likely born in 1930. She had an interest in dance and music since her childhood. She studied in Parry Charan Girls School, Banipith and later Shantiniketan.

== Career ==
Gupta joined Bengali cinema as a playback singer when music director Robin Chatterjee introduced her to films. Her debut film as an actress was Samarpan which was released in 1949. She acted in theater in parallel with the silver screen. Her performance in Kabi, Ratna Dip, Champadangar Bou, Hansuli Banker Upokatha made her an established film actress and she rapidly worked her way to the top among Bengali actresses within five years. She also worked with Satyajit Ray in Abhijan and Kanchanjangha. Gupta first married footballer Anil De. Her second marriage was with actor Rabi Ghosh.

== Filmography ==
Year	Title	Role	Source	Note
1948	Bish Bachar Pore			
1948	Ghumiye Ache Graam			
1949	Abhijatya			
1949	Kavi	Thakurjhee		
1949	Ananya			
1949	Bamuner Meye	Sandhya		
1950	Mandanda			
1950	Sheshbesh			
1951	Ratnadeep			
1953	Bhagaban Shrikrishna Chaitanya	Shiuli		
1954	Champadangar Bou	Kadambini		
1954	Kalyani			
1954	Mantra Shakti			
1954	Jaydev	Bimala		
1954	Jadubhatta			
1955	Anupama	Kalyani		
1955	Kankabatir Ghat			
1955	Kalindi			
1955	Upahar	Sunil's aunt		
1955	Shreebatsa Chinta			
1955	Aparadhi			
1955	Swami Vivekananda			
1956	Shankar Narayan Bank			
1956	Shyamali			
1956	Saheb Bibi Golam	Jaba		
1956	Trijama	Abala		
1956	Mahanisa			
1958	Tansen	Prem Kumari		
1959	Shree Shree Mahalaxmi Puja	Sriya Chandaluni		
1960	Masoom	Mrs. Gupta		
1960	Shesh Parjantya			
1961	Maa			
1962	Hansuli Banker Upakatha			
1962	Kanchenjungha	Anima		
1962	Dhoop Chhaya			
1963	Palatak	Golap		
1963	Tridhara	Chhoto maa - Kali's wife		
1963	Chhaya Surya			
1964	Subha O Debatar Gras			
1964	Bibhas	Bidyut Bala		
1965	Alor Pipasa	Neela Devi		
1965	Jaya	Mejobou		
1965	Mukhujey Paribar			
1967	Nayika Sangbad	Ramaboudi		
1967	Balika Badhu			
1968	Panchashar			
1968	Mathur			
1969	Parineeta	Charu's mother		
1969	Pratham Kadam Phool	Sukanto's aunt		
1970	Padmagolap			
1970	Rupasi	Balaram's Eldest SIL		
1970	Ekhoni			
1970	Dibratrir Kabya			
1971	Calcutta 71			Kolkata 71 was referenced
1971	Chhadmabeshi	Labanya		
1971	Pratham Pratishruty	Mokshada		
1971	Dhanyee Meye	Gobardhan's wife		
1971	Archana			
1972	Sesh Parba			
1972	Anindita	Latika (Biram's Sister in law)		
1972	Jaban			
1973	Chithi	Prasenjit's mother		
1974	Chhanda Patan			
1976	Datta	Nalini		(final film role)
