= Hansuli Banker Upakatha (film) =

1962 Bengali movie

Hansuli Banker Upakatha (Bengali: হাঁসুলীবাঁকের উপকথা) is a 1962 film by Tapan Sinha based on a novel by Tarashankar Bandopadhyay. The film was produced under the Jalan Productions banner starring Kali Bannerjee, Dilip Roy, Rabi Ghosh and others. Set in 1941, the movie explores life in rural Bengal, the realities of the Zamindari system that was responsible for much of the social inequalities in Bengal, as well as the changes in social perceptions with time.

== Cast ==
- Rabi Ghosh as Banwari
- Kali Banerjee
- Sukhen Das
- Anubha Gupta
- Ranjana Bannerjee
- Dilip Roy as Karali
- Bireswar Sen

== Awards ==
Jury Award-Sanfransisco Film Festival for Hansuli Banker Upokotha
