= Sundar =

Sundar (Devanagari: सुन्दर) is an adjective signifying attractive, beautiful, good, handsome or nice. It has its origin in Sanskrit language. The word is also used as names of people by speakers of languages branching off of Indo-Aryan languages.

== Given names ==
- Delhi P. Sunder Rajan, Indian violinist
- Sundar C (born 1968), Indian film director, writer, actor and producer
- Sundar C. Babu , Indian musician
- Sunder (actor) (1908–1992), Punjabi and Hindi film actor
- Sunder Lal Hora (1896–1955), Indian ichthyologist
- Sunder Lal Patwa (1924–2016), Indian politician
- Sunder Nix (born 1961), American sprinter
- Sundar Pichai (born 1972), CEO of Google LLC and Alphabet Inc.
- Sundar Popo (1943–2000), chutney artist from Trinidad and Tobago
- Sundar Raj (born 1951), Indian actor
- Sunder Ramu, Indian film and stage artist
- Sunder Singh Bhandari (1921–2005), Indian politician

== Middle names ==
- Braja Sundar Mitra
- Ramendra Sundar Tribedi
- Sadhu Sundar Singh
- Shyam Sundar Chakravarthy

== Last names ==
- Washington Sundar (born 1999), Indian Cricketer
- Khushbu Sundar (born 1970), Indian Actress and Politician
- Gopi Sundar C.S. (born 1977), Indian Musician and Actor
- Ashwin Sundar (1985-2017), Indian Race Driver
