= Tarasankar Bandyopadhyay =

Indian novelist (1898–1971)

- Born: 23 July 1898; Labhpur, Birbhum district, Bengal Presidency, British India
- Died: 14 September 1971 (aged 73); Calcutta, West Bengal, India
- Occupations: Novelist; Politician
- Spouse: Umashashi Devi (m. 1916)
- Writing career
- Notable awards: Rabindra Puraskar; Sahitya Akademi; Jnanpith Award; Padma Bhushan

Member of Parliament of the Rajya Sabha
- In office 3 April 1960 – 2 April 1966
- Constituency: Nominated

Tarasankar Bandyopadhyay (23 July 1898 – 14 September 1971) was an Indian novelist who wrote in the Bengali language. He wrote 65 novels, 53-story-books, 12 plays, 4 essay-books, 4 autobiographies, 2 travel stories and composed several songs. He was awarded Rabindra Puraskar, Sahitya Akademi Award, Jnanpith Award, Padma Shri and Padma Bhushan. He was nominated for Nobel Prize in Literature in 1971 and posthumously nominated in 1972.

== Biography ==
He fought against the british during the non-cooperation movement and was later arrested for political activism. Turning to literature after his release in 1930, he published his first novel Chaitali Ghurni in 1932 and met Rabindranath Tagore. Over the years, he presided over major literary conferences and received several prestigious awards including the Rabindra Puraskar, Sahitya Akademi Award, JnanpitTarasankar Bandyopadhyay, a renowned Bengali writer, was born in Labhpur, Birbhum, in British India. Educated at St. Xavier's and South Suburban College, he became involved in theh Award, Padma Shri, and Padma Bhushan. He served in both the West Bengal Legislative Council and Rajya Sabha. Bandyopadhyay died in 1971. In 2021, his ancestral home was turned into a museum preserving his legacy. Bandyopadhyay was born at his ancestral home at Labhpur village in Birbhum district, Bengal Province, British India (now West Bengal, India) to Haridas Bandyopadhyay and Prabhabati Devi. Grandfather name Jadavlal Bandyopadhyay.

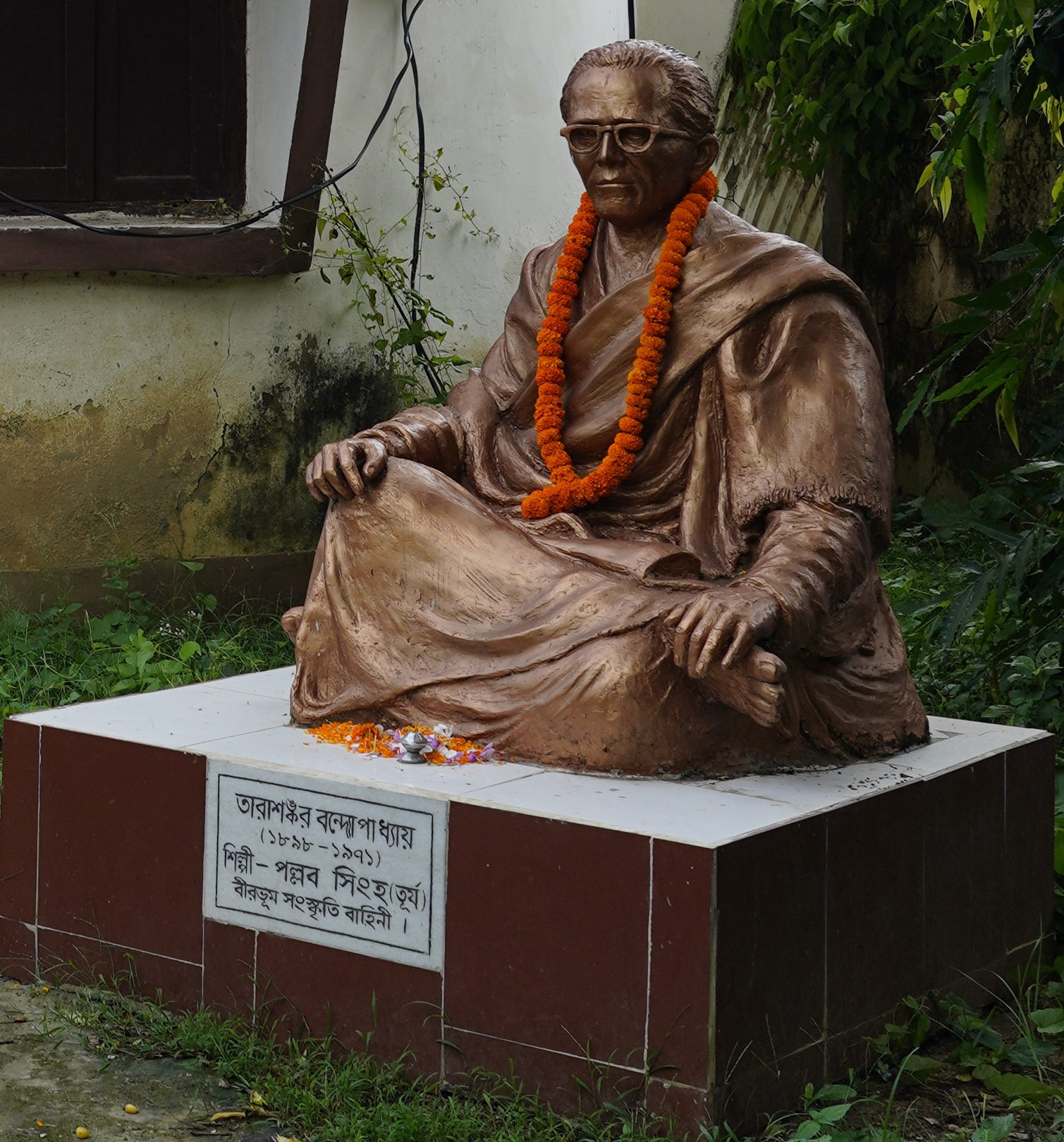
Statue of Tarasankar Bandyopadhyay, Labhpur, Birbhum, India

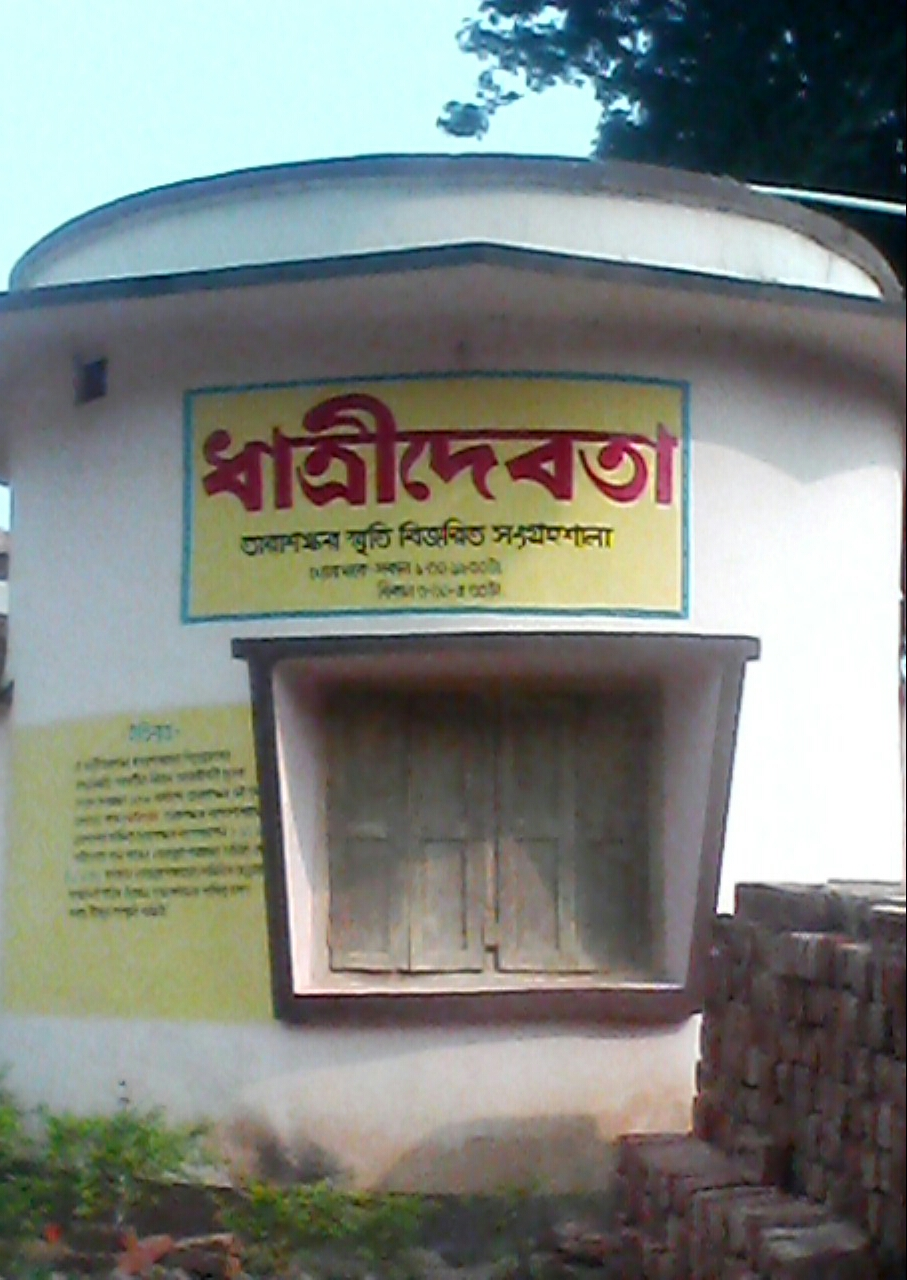
House of Tarashankar Bandyopadhyay at Labhpur, Birbhum

He passed the Matriculation examination from Labhpur Jadablal H. E. School in 1916 and was later admitted first to St. Xavier's College, Calcutta and then to South Suburban College (now Asutosh College). While studying in intermediate at St. Xavier's College, he joined the non-co-operation movement. He could not complete his university course due to ill health and political activism. During these college years, he was also associated with a radical militant youth group and was arrested and interned in his village.

He was arrested in 1930 for actively supporting the Indian independence movement, but released later that year. After that he decided to devote himself to literature. In 1932, he met Rabindranath Tagore at Santiniketan for the first time. His first novel Chaitali Ghurni was published on the same year.

In 1940, he rented a house at Bagbazar and brought his family to Calcutta. In 1941, he moved to Baranagar. In 1942, he presided over the Birbhum District Literature Conference and became the president of the Anti-Fascist Writers and Artists Association in Bengal. In 1944, he presided over the Kanpur Bengali Literature Conference arranged by the non-resident Bengalis living there. In 1947, he inaugurated Prabasi Banga Sahitya Sammelan held in Calcutta; presided over the Silver Jubilee Prabasi Banga Sahitya Sammelan in Bombay; and received Sarat Memorial Medal from the University of Calcutta. In 1948, he moved to his own house at Tala Park, Calcutta.

In 1952, he was nominated to be a member of the legislative assembly. He was a member of the West Bengal Vidhan Parishad between 1952–60. In 1954, he took Diksha from his mother. In the same year he scripted and directed a film, Naa, based on his own story. In 1955, he was awarded the Rabindra Puraskar by the Government of West Bengal. In 1956, he received the Sahitya Akademi Award. In 1957 he visited Soviet Union to join the preparatory committee of the Afro-Asian Writers' Association and later went to Tashkent at an invitation from the Chinese Government as the leader of the Indian Writers delegation at the Afro-Asian Writers' Association.

In 1959, he received the Jagattarini Gold Medal from the University of Calcutta, and presided over All India Writer's Conference in Madras. In 1960, he retired from the West Bengal Legislative Assembly but was nominated to the Parliament by the President of India. He was a member of Rajya Sabha between 1960–66. In 1962, he received Padma Shri; but the death of his son-in-law broke his heart and to keep himself diverted he took to painting and making wooden toys. In 1963, he received Sisirkumar Award. In 1966, he retired from the Parliament and presided over Nagpur Bengali Literature Conference. In 1966, he won the Jnanpith Award and in 1969, he received Padma Bhushan and was honoured with the title of Doctor of Literature by the University of Calcutta and the Jadavpur University. In 1969, he was given the fellowship of Sahitya Akademi, in 1970 became the president of Bangiya Sahitya Parishad/Vangiya Sahitya Parishad. In 1971, he gave the Nripendrachandra Memorial Lecture at Visva-Bharati University and D. L. Roy Memorial Lecture at the University of Calcutta.

Bandyopadhyay died at his Calcutta residence early in the morning on 14 September 1971. His last rites were performed at the Nimtala Cremation Ground, North Calcutta.

== Family members and relatives ==
Tarasankar Bandyopadhyay was married to Umashashi Devi in 1916. Their eldest son Sanatkumar Bandyopadhyay was born in 1918; the youngest son Saritkumar Bandyopadhyay was born in 1922; the eldest daughter Ganga was born in 1924; the second daughter Bulu was born in 1926 but died in 1932; the youngest daughter Bani was born in 1932.

== Awards ==
- 1955 – Rabindra Puraskar for his novel Arogya Niketan
- 1956 – Sahitya Akademi Award
- 1966 – Jnanpith Award for his novel Ganadebata.
- 1962 – Padma Shri
- 1969 – Padma Bhushan
- ---- – Sharat Smriti Puraskar
- ---- – Jagattarini Gold Medal from the Calcutta University

== Bibliography ==
=== Poetry ===
- Tripatra (1926)

=== Novels ===
- Chaitali Ghurni (1928)
- Pashanpuri (1933)
- Nilkantha (1933)
- Raikamal (1935; The Eternal Lotus in English, 1945)
- Prem O Prayojon (1936)
- Aagun (1938)
- Dhatridebata (1939)
- Kalindi (1940)
- Ganadebata (1943)
- Panchagram (1944)
- Manvantar (1944)
- Kavi (1944)
- Bingsho Shatabdi (1945)
- Sandipan Pathshala (1946)
- Jhar O Jharapata (1946)
- Abhijan (1946)
- Chhotoder Sandipan Pathshala (1948)
- Padachihna (1950)
- Uttarayan (1950)
- Hansuli Banker Upakatha (1951)
- Tamas Tapasya (1952)
- Nagini Kanyar Kahini (1952)
- Arogya Niketan (1953)
- Champadangar Bou (1954)
- Panchaputtali (1956)
- Bicharak (1957)
- Saptapadi (1958)
- Bipasha (1959)
- Radha (1959)
- Manusher Mon (1959)
- Dak Harkara (1959)
- Mahashweta (1961)
- Yogobhrashta (1961)
- Naa (1961)
- Nagarik (1961)
- Nishipadma (1962)
- Yatibhanga (1962)
- Kanna (1962)
- Kalbaishakhi (1963)
- Ekti Charui Pakhi O Kalo Meye (1963)
- Jangalgarh (1964)
- Manjari Opera (1964)
- Sanket (1964)
- Bhubanpurer Hat (1964)
- Basantaraag (1964)
- Swargo-Marto (1965)
- Bichitra (1965)
- Ganna Begum (1965)
- Aranyabahni (1966)
- Hirapanna (1966)
- Mahanagari (1966)
- Gurudakshina (1966)
- Shuksari Katha (1967)
- Shakkar Bai (1967)
- Moni Boudi (1969)
- Chhayapath (1969)
- Kalratri (1970)
- Rupasi Bihangini (1970)
- Abhinetri (1970)
- Fariad (1971)
- Shatabdir Mrityu (1971)
- Kishkindhya Kando (Children's novel, 1972)
- Janapada
- Kirtihater Karcha

=== Short story collections ===
- Chhalanamoyee (1937)
- Jalsaghar (1938)
- Rasakali (1939)
- Tin Shunyo (1942)
- Pratidhwani (1943)
- Bedeni (1943)
- Dilli Ka Laddu (1943)
- Jadukari (1944)
- Sthalapadma (1944)
- Terosho Ponchash (1944)
- Prasadmala (1945)
- Harano Sur (1945)
- Imarat (1947)
- Ramdhanu (1947)
- Tarasankarer Shrestha Galpa (1947)
- Sri Panchami (1948)
- Kamdhenu (1949)
- Tarasankar Bandyopadhyayer Shreshta Galpa (1950)
- Mati (1950)
- Shilasan (1952)
- Tarasankar Bandyopadhyayer Priyo Galpo (1953)
- Swa-Nirbachito Galpo (1954)
- Galpa-Sanchayan (1955)
- Bisforan (1955)
- Chhotoder Shrestha Galpa (1956)
- Kalantar (1956)
- Bishpathar (1957)
- Rabibarer Asar (1959)
- Premer Galpa (1961)
- Paush-Lakshmi (1961)
- Alokabhisar
- Chirantani (1962)
- Accident (1962)
- Chhotoder Bhalo Bhalo Galpo (1962)
- Tamasha (1963)
- Galpo Panchashat (1963)
- Ayena (1963)
- Chinmoyee (1964)
- Ekti Premer Galpo (1965)
- Kishor Sanchayan (1966)
- Tapobhanga
- Dipar Prem (1966)
- Nari Rahasyamayi (1967)
- Panchakanya (1967)
- Shibanir Adrishta (1967)
- Gobin Singher Ghora (1968)
- Jaya (1968)
- Ek Pashla Brishti (1969)
- Chhotoder Shrestha Galpo (1969)
- Michhil (1969)
- Unish Sho Ekattor (1971)

=== Drama ===
- Kalindi (1942)
- Duipurush (1943)
- Pather Daak (1943)
- Dwipantar (1945)
- Yugabiplab (1951)
- Kavi (1957)
- Kalratri (1957)
- Sanghat (1962)
- Arogya Niketan (1968)

=== Farce ===
- Chakmaki (1945)

=== Memoirs ===
- Amar Kaler Katha (1951)
- Bichitro Smritikahini (1953)
- Amar Sahitya Jiban, Vol. I (1953)
- Koishor Smriti (1956)
- Amar Sahitya Jiban, Vol. II (1962)

=== Travelogue ===
- Moscow-te Koyek Din (1959)

=== Essays ===
- Sahityer Satya (1961)
- Bharatbarsha O Chin (1963)
- Rabindranath O Banglar Palli (1971)

=== Collected works ===
- Rachana Sangraha, Vol. I (1959)
- Rachanabali, Vol. 1–25 (Mitra & Ghosh Publishers)
- "Galpaguchha" (Short Stories) Vol. 1-3 (Sishu Sahitya Samsad)

=== Discography ===
List of all songs for which Lyrics were composed by Tarasankar Bandyopadhyay

Tarasankar Bandyopadhyay Discography
Year	Song	Singer	Film/album	Lyrics	Music
-	Aamar bajubondher jhumko dolay	Sandhya Mukherjee	-	Tarasankar Bandyopadhyay	Sudhin Dasgupta
1975	Aha bhalobese ei bujhechhi	Jatileswar Mukherjee	-	Tarasankar Bandyopadhyay	Ashoke Roy
1962	Bhai re alor tare	Hemanta Mukherjee	Hasuli Baaker Upokotha	Tarasankar Bandyopadhyay	Hemanta Mukherjee
1949	Chand dekhe kalanka	Rabin Majumdar	-	Tarasankar Bandyopadhyay	-
1957	Ei khed mor mone	Rabin Majumdar	Kobi	Tarasankar Bandyopadhyay	Anil Bagchi
1962	Gopane moner kotha	Hemanta Mukherjee	Hasuli Baaker Upokotha	Tarasankar Bandyopadhyay	Hemanta Mukherjee
1954	Kamal mukh shukeye geche	Manabendra Mukherjee	Chaapa Dangar Bou	Tarasankar Bandyopadhyay	Manabendra Mukherjee
1970	Maran tomar	Manna Dey	Manjari Opera	Tarasankar Bandyopadhyay	-
1968	Milana mdhu madhuri bhora	Manabendra Mukherjee	Ramya Geeti, All India Radio	Tarasankar Bandyopadhyay	Jnan Prakash Ghosh
1962	Mora jor paye chalibo	Hemanta Mukherjee and Debabrata Biswas	Hasuli Baaker Upokotha	Tarasankar Bandyopadhyay	Hemanta Mukherjee
1957	O amar moner manush go	Rabin Majumdar	Kobi	Tarasankar Bandyopadhyay	Anil Bagchi
-	O hay chokher chhotay	Rabin Majumdar	-	Tarasankar Bandyopadhyay	-
1958	Ogo tomar shesh bicharer ashay	Manne Dey	Dak Harkara	Tarasankar Bandyopadhyay	Sudhin Dasgupta
1975	Paran bodhua tumi	female voice	Kobi	Tarasankar Bandyopadhyay	Anil Bagchi
1968	Praner radhar kon thikana	Manabendra Mukherjee	Ramya Geeti, All India Radio	Tarasankar Bandyopadhyay	Jnan Prakash Ghosh
1975	Praner radhar kon thikana	Jatileswar Mukherjee	-	Tarasankar Bandyopadhyay	Ashoke Roy
1954	Shiba he shiba he	Manabendra Mukherjee	Chaapa Dangar Bou	Tarasankar Bandyopadhyay	Manabendra Mukherjee

== Screen adaptation ==
=== Film ===
Year	Title	Language	Ref.
1945	Dui Purush	Bengali	
1948	Dhatri Debata	Bengali	
1949	Kavi (1949 film)	Bengali	
	Bedeni	Bengali	
1954	Champadangar Bou	Bengali	
1957	Bicharak	Bengali	
1958	Jalsaghar	Bengali	
1961	Saptapadi	Bengali	
1961	Hum Dono	Hindi	
1962	Bipasha	Bengali	
1962	Hansuli Banker Upakatha	Bengali	
1962	Padithal Mattum Podhuma	Tamil	
1962	Abhijan	Bengali	
1967	Arogya Niketan	Bengali	
1972	Snehadeepame Mizhi Thurakku	Malayalam	
1978	Ganadevata	Bengali	
1980	Aanchal	Hindi	
1983	Agradani	Bengali	
1995	Daughters of This Century	Hindi	
2005	Antarmahal	Bengali	

=== TV series ===
Year	Title	Language	Ref.
1987—88	Ganadevta	Hindi	
