= Kumkum the Dancer =

- Directed by: Modhu Bose
- Release date: 1940
- Country: India
- Languages: Bengali and Hindi

Kumkum the Dancer is a 1940 Bollywood film directed by Modhu Bose. It was released in both Bengali and Hindi.

== Cast ==
- Sadhana Bose as Kumkum
- Dhiraj Bhattacharya as Chandan
- Preeti Majumdar as Pradeep
- Padma Devi
- Moni Chatterjee
- Shashadhar Chatterjee
- Lalit Rai
- Binita Gupta
- Labanya Palit
- Abani Mitra
- Kabir Ray
- Bhujanga Ray
- Kira Devi
- Josobant Agashi
- Shanta Majumdar
