= Molina Devi =

Bengali actress

- Born: 1917; Calcutta, British India
- Died: 13 August 1977 (aged 59–60); Calcutta
- Occupations: Actress (theatre and cinema); Head of theatrical company
- Years active: 1920s–1970s
- Spouse: Gurudas Banerjee

Molina Devi (1917 — 13 August 1977), also known as Molina Debi and Malina Debi, was an Indian Bengali actress of Bengali and Hindi film and theatre. As an actress, she played a wide variety of parts, later frequently playing matronly parts, especially Rani Rashmoni, patroness of the 19th century Bengali mystic Sri Ramakrishna. She acted in several dozen films, mostly in Bengali and Hindi. With actor Gurudas Banerjee, she also directed a Calcutta-based theatre troupe, M. G. Enterprises.

== Early life ==
Molina Devi was born on 13 August 1917 in Calcutta.

== Career ==
Molina Devi started her career as trainee under Aparesh Chandra Mukhopadhyay. She debuted in a silent film at the age of 8. (Note: "Trained in acting by Aparesh Mukhopadhyay, she debuted in a silent movie as an 8-year-old. She began her stage career, like many of ... She teamed up with Gurudas Bandyopadhyay, her co-artist in theatres to form a troupe, M. G. Enterprise, which specialized in commercial productions of devotional drama where he enacted Ramakrishna and other holy men. She made quite a stir as the lead in the ...") Thereafter worked as dancer in mythological and historical plays in the Bengali theatre in the 1920s, and later sometimes played roles as a young boy, such as the role of Dara in Jahangir (1929), and later played roles as a heroine. She also performed some memorable roles in Hindi films. She took various roles, even vamps in her early career such as in Pramathesh Barua's Rajat Jayanti in 1939.

In 1954 she got a break through in Puran Bhagat and in 1955, Molina played the title role in the film Rani Rasmani. She also directed a Kolkata based theatre troupe, M. G. Enterprises. Molina worked in Rangana theatre as chief artist. She performed as a singer on radio and contributed for formation of Mahila Silpi Mahal, a welfare association for female artists of Bengal. For her contribution in the field of drama, she receives the Sangeet Natak Akademi Award.

Molina Devi and actor Gurudas Banerjee together they operated their own touring theatre, M. G. Enterprises, which "specialized in commercial productions of devotional drama" in which Banerjee played the role of Sri Ramakrishna and other holy men."

Molina Devi died on 13 August 1977 in Kolkata.

=== Roles ===
Molina Devi acted in a variety of roles, many times as Rani Rashmoni, which she played on both stage and in film.

From the 1950s through the 1970s, Molina Devi commonly portrayed Rani Rashmoni in the Bengali Theatre and films.

Sushil Mukherjee explains that the drama Jugadevata, which debuted on the Calcutta stage on 19 November 1948,

was a devotional drama... on the life of the Saint of Dakshineswar [Ramakrishna] [that] became immensely popular and established two artistes who became wholly identified with the two characters they represented. These were Gurudas Banerjee who was seen as Sri Ramkrishna and Molina Debi who appeared as Rani Rasmoni, the founder of the famous Bhabatarini (Kali) temple at Dakshineswar. Since their appearance in Jugadevata at Kalika in 1948 Gurudas and Molina have appeared in the characters of these two persons in a number of other plays, both on the stage and on the screen....

Films in which Molina Devi played the role of Rani Rashmoni included Rani Rashmoni (1955). Theatrical plays in which she played Rani Rashmoni included Jugadebata (1948) and Thakur Sri Ramakrishna (1955).

=== Reception ===
According to Sushil Mukherjee, in the many screen and stage appearances since 1948 in which Molina Devi and Gurudas Banerjee have played Rani Rashmoni and Ramakrishna Dev together, they "have carried the audience with them in every performance."

In 1966, The Illustrated Weekly of India mentioned Molina Devi's troupe's performance in a review of the 1965-66 theatre season in Delhi. The Weekly stated that

Milan Samity of Delhi sponsored the M. G. Enterprise of Calcutta, who brought two plays, Thakur Shri Ramakrishna and Baskunther Will, and an able company of actors. The credit for composing Thakur Shri Ramakrishna, round the story of Rani Rashmoni, and for bringing this legendary figure to life on the stage, goes to Molina Devi and Gurudas, who headed the company.... It is not easy to put across a religious theme, but Molina and Gurudas did so convincingly, helped greatly by the telling effects of light and music.

=== Theatre roles ===
The following table partially chronicles Molina Devi's stage career. It is not complete.

Opening date	Title	Role	Location Calcutta unless otherwise specified	Playwright	Director	Notes and other cast
19 Nov. 1948	Jugadebata	Rani Rashmoni	Kalika Theatre	Tarak Mukherjee		Source; Also Gurudas Banerjee (Sri Ramakrishna)
1955	Thakur Sri Ramakrishna	Rani Rashmoni	Minerva Theatre			Source; Also Gurudas Banerjee (Sri Ramakrishna). Part of a state Congress celebration

=== Film roles ===
Roles and details of selected films of Molina Devi appear in the table below. Films known to be dubbed versions of other films have not been listed. Any films known to be multilinguals (separately filmed in multiple languages) are explicitly noted as multilinguals. (Note: Some Indian films are known as "multilinguals," having been filmed in similar but non-identical versions in different languages. According to Rajadhyaksha and Willemen in the Encyclopaedia of Indian Cinema (1994), in its most precise form, a multilingual is "a bilingual or a trilingual [that] was the kind of film made in the 1930s in the studio era, when different but identical takes were made of every shot in different languages, often with different leading stars but identical technical crew and music." They wrote that in seeking to assemble the Encyclopedia, it they often found it "extremely difficult to distinguish multilinguals in this original sense from dubbed versions, remakes, reissues or, in some cases, the same film listed with different titles, presented as separate versions in different languages.... it will take years of scholarly work to establish definitive data in this respect.")

Year	Film title	Molina Role	Film director	Notes & Sources (DB=data base)
1950	Vidyasagar (1950 film)	?	Kali Prasad Ghosh	Bengali; Sources: DBs, other Gurudas Banerjee as Sri Ramakrishna
1952	Vidyasagar	? (Note: Probable but unconfirmed - see Talk:Gurudas Banerjee)	Kali Prasad Ghosh	Hindi; Sources: DBs
1955	Rani Rashmoni	Rani Rashmoni	Kali Prasad Ghosh	Bengali; Sources: DBs Gurudas Banerjee as Sri Ramakrishna
1958	Sadhak Bamakhyapa	?	Banshi Ash	Bengali; Sources: DBs Gurudas Banerjee as Sadhak Bamakhyapa
1956	Mahakavi Girish Chandra	?	Madhu Bose	Bengali; Sources: DBs Pahadi Sanyal as Girish Chandra Ghosh. The film won a 1956 Certificate of Merit. Gurudas Banerjee as Sri Ramakrishna
1964	Bireswar Vivekananda	?	Madhu Bose	Bengali; Sources: DBs Amaresh Das as Vivekananda, Gurudas Banerjee as Sri Ramakrishna

== Partial filmography ==
- Srikanta (1930)
- Chirakumar Sabha (1932)
- Kapalkundala (1933)
- Rajrani Meera (1933)
- Puran Bhagat (film) (1933)
- Dulari Bibi (1933)
- Abhagin (1938)
- Manzil (1936)
- Karodpati (1936)
- Bardidi (1939)
- Rajat Jayanti (1939)
- Banglar Meye (1941)
- Matir Ghar (1944)
- Mane Na Mana (1945)
- Nandita (1945)
- Arabian Nights (1946)
- Ramer Sumati (1947)
- Srinkhal (1947)
- Shesh Nibedan (1948)
- Vidyasgar (1950)
- Baikunther Will (1950)
- Sharey Chuattor (1953)
- Saat Number Kayedi (1953)
- Nabin Jatra (1953)
- Annapurnar Mandir (1954)
- Ora Thake Odhare (1954)
- Mantra Shakti (1954)
- Rani Rasmani (1955)
- Mahakavi Girish Chandra (1956)
- Ekti Raat (1956)
- Nilachaley Mahaprabhu (1957)
- Sree Sree Maa (1958)
- Indranath Srikanta O Annadadidi (1959)
- "Jug Devata" (1960)
- Saat Paake Bandha (1963)
- Bireswar Vivekananda (1964)
- Rup Sanatan (1965)
- Bon Palashir Padabali (1973)
- Debi Choudhrani (1974)
- Fuleswari (1974)
- Moyna (1978)
