= Anurupa Debi =

18th century Bengali female novelist (1882-1958)

- অনুরূপা দেবী
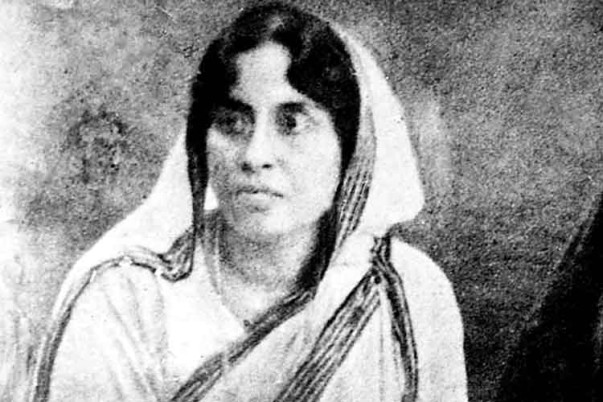
- Anurupa Debi
- Born: 9 September 1882; Shyambazar, Calcutta, British India
- Died: 19 April 1958 (aged 75); Raniganj, West Bengal, India
- Occupation: Writer
- Spouse: Shikharnath Bandopadhyay
- Children: Ambujnath Bandopadhyay
- Writing career
- Pen name: Rani Devi; Anupama Devi
- Language: Bengali
- Notable works: Maa (1934); Pather Sathi(1946); Mantra Shakti (1954); Gariber Meye (1960)

Anurupa Debi (9 September 1882 – 19 April 1958) (also known as Anurupa Devi) was one of the most reputed female novelists in Bengali literature in the British colonial era. She was also an eminent short story writer, poet as well as a social worker. Debi was one of the first female writers in Bengali literature to gain considerable prominence and popularity.

== Early and personal life ==
Anurupa Debi was born on 9 September 1882 to then Deputy Magistrate and writer, Mukunda Mukhopadhyay and Dhorasundari Debi at her maternal uncle's house at Shyambazar, Calcutta (now, Kolkata). Social reformer, Bhudeb Mukhopadhyay was her paternal grandfather. Her maternal grandfather, Nagendranath Bandopadhyay was one of the founder-members of famous Bangiya Natyashala. Her elder sister Surupa Devi (1879–1922) was also a famous novelist of her time who used to write in her pseudonym, Indira Devi.

At the age of ten, she married Shikharnath Bandopadhyay, in Chinsura, Hooghly. They passed a vast period of their life in Muzaffarpur, Bihar.

== Education ==
Due to severe physical illness in her childhood, Anurupa Debi started to learn a little late. While she was bedridden, her elder sister Surupa Devi used to recite Kashidasi Mahabharata and Krittivasi Ramayana to pass their leisure time. Also, according to rules of their family, during their Grandpa's leisure time, they would sit next to him and listen to one chapter of Mahabharata and Ramayana each day. As a result, Anurupa Debi easily absorbed that subject in her mind. In this context, she said, "Even though at that time I was illiterate, but it cannot be said that I was uneducated, as I memorised most of the stories of Ramayana-Mahabharata. At that time I was of 7."

Her elder sisters used to practice writing poetry by reading Sanskrit poems from their Grandpa. Thus, she also became educated in her childhood under the patronage of their Grandpa, Bhudeb Mukhopadhyay and father Mukunda Mukhopadhyay. She had a special fondness for education and learning since her childhood. Besides Bengali, she earned considerable mastery in Sanskrit and Hindi. She used to study to a lot of books of various Western Scholars and therefore became acquainted with Western science and philosophy.

== Literary works ==
Till the mid-19th century, Indian women were deprived from education and people used to restrict them only within household chores, as they remained largely uneducated. It was seen as a social 'crime' for them to be educated or to achieve basic level of education. They didn't have equal rights at all. In the context of severe gender discrimination, Debi broke the chain and established herself as an eminent Bengali novelist, writer and poet of her time.

Once in her childhood, her elder sister Surupa Devi sent her letters on colorful papers in form of poetry. Reading that letter Anurupa Devi became confused how should she reply. When she asked her Grandpa for advice, Bhudeb babu insisted her to write the reply in form of poetry. On advice of her Grandpa, Anurupa Devi wrote a reply letter in form of poetry as given below:

পাইয়া তোমার পত্র, পুলকিত হল গাত্র আস্তেব্যস্তে খুলিলাম পড়িবার তরে |

পুঁথি গন্ধ পাইলাম, কারুকার্য হেরিলাম পুলক জাগিল অন্তরে |

— Anurupa Devi, Anurupa Devi-r Nirbachito Golpo (Note: Receiving your letter, delighted me, opened it slowly to read. Getting the smell of book, watching the artwork, excitement awakens amid (English translation))

This poem is known to be the very first composition of Anurupa Debi. In her words,

"I can't remember whether it is in the original form or not, which I wrote. It is probably the version after being revised by Grandpa. However, this is the very first composition of my life."

She successfully composed Markandeya Chandi in a poem and the starting chapter of Valmiki Ramayana before the age of only 10.

Debi used not to reveal her initial literary endeavors to anyone except her elder sister, Surupa Devi, who used to write in her pseudonym, Indira Devi. Her first piece of work got published in Kuntalin Purashkar Granthamala with the pseudonym, Rani Devi.

== Critical reception ==
In 2013, Swapna Dutta writes for The Hindu, Anurupa "ruthlessly pointed out the evils of the prevalent social code," and "Nearly all her novels were made into successful stage plays and films."

== Notable works ==
- Tilakuthi (1906)
- Poshyaputra (1912)
- Bagdotta (1914)
- Jyotihara (1915)
- Mantrashakti (1915)
- Ramgarh (1918)
- Pather Sathi (1918)
- Rangashankha (1918)
- Mahanisha (1919)
- Maa (1920)
- Vidyaratna (1920)
- Shonar Khoni (1922)
- Kumaril Bhatta (1923)
- Uttarayan (1923)
- Pathhara (1923)
- Anurupa Devir Nirbachito Golpo (in Bengali) (1 ed.). Kolkata: Dey's Publishing. 2002. ISBN 978-8176129978.

== Awards ==
- Kuntalin Puraskar for the first published story
- 1919: Sri Bharat Dharma Mahamandal awarded her the title of Dharma Chandrika
- 1935: Jagattarini Gold Medal by Calcutta University
