= Syeda Razia Faiz =

Bangladeshi politician (1936–2013)

- সৈয়দা রাজিয়া ফয়েজ

Member of Jatiya Sangsad
- In office 18 February 1979 – 12 February 1982
- Preceded by: Salahuddin Yusuf
- Constituency: Khulna-14 (now-defunct)
- In office 1 October 2001 – 29 October 2006
- Succeeded by: Syeda Jebunnesa Haque
- Constituency: Reserved Women's Seat–35

Member of 4th National Assembly
- In office 1965–1969
- Preceded by: Begum Serajunnesa Choudhury
- Constituency: NE-78 (Women’s Constituency III)

Personal details
- Born: 18 April 1936 Murshidabad, Bengal Province, British India
- Died: 15 November 2013 (aged 77) Dhaka, Bangladesh
- Party: Bangladesh Nationalist Party; Islami Jatiya Oikya Front
- Spouse: Mohammad Abul Faiz
- Parent: Syed Badrudduja (father)
- Relatives: Syeda Sakina Islam (sister) Syed Ashraf Ali (brother)

Syeda Razia Faiz (18 April 1936 – 15 November 2013) was a prominent Bangladeshi politician and government minister. She served as a member of the National Assembly of Pakistan in the 1960s. In 1979, she became the first (and only) woman to be elected as one of 300 members of the Jatiya Sangsad (Parliament of Bangladesh). She was also Minister of Women and Children’s Affairs during the Ershad regime.

== Early life and family ==
Faiz was born on 18 April 1936 into a Bengali Muslim family of Syeds from the village of Talibpur in Murshidabad. Her father, Syed Badrudduja, was a mayor of Kolkata and a member of the Bengal Legislative Assembly and India's Lok Sabha.

Meanwhile, her sister Syeda Sakina Islam, was among the 30 nominated members for reserved women’s seats (a quota for the party which holds the majority) in the same national parliament.

== Career ==
Faiz was elected to the Pakistan National Assembly in the 1960s under President Ayub Khan, representing the country on a number of delegations overseas, demonstrating a unique moment in history where she was a Pakistani stateswoman concurrently to her father’s membership of India’s Lok Sabha.

During the Bangladesh Liberation War she was also part of the Pakistani delegation to the United Nations. She was placed under house arrest in Bangladesh after its independence.

In 1979, Faiz was elected from the former constituency of Abdus Sabur Khan to Bangladesh's Parliament. She was the first female elected member of parliament in Bangladesh. In 1989, she was appointed as the minister for women and social welfare during the regime of Hussain Muhammad Ershad. Later, she served as the Vice President of the Bangladesh Nationalist Party until her death.

== Personal life and death ==
Faiz was married to Mohammad Abul Faiz, chairman of Petrobangla. They had a daughter, Fawzia Alam, and two sons, Osman Ershad Faiz and Aman Ashraf Faiz. She died on 15 November 2013.
