= Gurudas Banerjee =

Indian stage and film actor

- Occupations: Actor (theatre and cinema); Head of theatrical company
- Years active: 1940s–1980s
- Spouse: Molina Devi

Gurudas Banerjee, also known as Gurudas Bandyopadhyay, is an Indian stage and film actor who was active from the 1940s through the 1980s. As an actor, he commonly played holy men, especially the 19th century Bengali mystic Sri Ramakrishna, a role he was said to "almost monopolize." He acted in more than 80 films, mostly in Bengali. With his wife, actress Molina Devi, he also directed a Calcutta-based theatre troupe, M. G. Enterprises.

== Biography ==
Gurudas Banerjee had his stage debut in 1948 at Calcutta's Kalika Theatre in the role of Sri Ramakrishna in Yugadevata. He continued acting in theatre and cinema until the 1980s. Banerjee married Molina Devi (1917-1977), who has been characterized as "one of the finest actresses of Indian theatre and cinema." Together, they operated their own touring theatre, M. G. Enterprises, which "specialized in commercial productions of devotional drama" in which Banerjee played the role of Sri Ramakrishna and other holy men.

== Roles ==
Gurudas Banerjee acted in a variety of roles, very commonly as Sri Ramakrishna, which he played on both stage and in film. Other roles that Banerjee played in film included Sadhak Bamakhyapa (Sadhak Bamakshyapa, 1958; Joy Maa Tara, 1978), Gobinda, Husband Of Chandi (Swayamsiddha, 1947), Ramola's Father (Sare Chuattar, 1953), Jitu, Anita's Father (Ekti Raat, 1956), Pishemashai (Indranath, Srikanta O Annadadidi, 1959), Neepa's Father (Mouchak, 1975), and Agniswar's Father-in-law (Agniswar, 1975).

From the 1950s through the 1970s, Gurudas Banerjee commonly portrayed Ramakrishna in the Bengali Theatre and films. Beginning in the late 1940s, "he almost monopolized this role [of Ramakrishna] as a specialist, both on the stage and on the screen," and was still portraying Ramakrishna in the late-1970s. Sushil Mukherjee explains that the drama Jugadevata, which debuted on the Calcutta stage on 19 November 1948,

was a devotional drama... on the life of the Saint of Dakshineswar [Ramakrishna] [that] became immensely popular and established two artistes who became wholly identified with the two characters they represented. These were Gurudas Banerjee who was seen as Sri Ramkrishna and Molina Devi who appeared as Rani Rasmoni, the founder of the famous Bhabatarini (Kali) temple at Dakshineswar. Since their appearance in Jugadevata at Kalika in 1948 Gurudas and Molina have appeared in the characters of these two persons in a number of other plays, both on the stage and on the screen....

Films in which Banerjee played the role of Ramakrishna included Vidyasagar(1950),Rani Rashmoni (1955), Mahakavi Girish Chandra (1956), Bireswar Vivekananda (1964), and Jata Mat Tata Path (1979). Theatrical plays in which Banerjee played Ramakrishna included Jugadebata (1948), Thakur Sri Ramakrishna (1955), and Nata Nati (1975). In fact he was the only actor to play roles of all the prominent Shaakto (Devotee of Goddess Shakti) mystics of the 18th and 19th Century Bengal, namely Sadhak Ramprasad, Kamalakanta Bhattacharya, Shri Ramakrishna Paramhamsa and Sadhak Bamakhyapa.

== Reception ==
According to Sushil Mukherjee, in the many screen and stage appearances since 1948 in which Banerjee and Molina Devi have played Ramakrishna and Rani Rashmoni together, they "have carried the audience with them in every performance."

In 1966, The Illustrated Weekly of India mentioned Banerjee's troupe's performance in a review of the 1965-66 theatre season in Delhi. The Weekly stated that

Milan Samity of Delhi sponsored the M. G. Enterprise of Calcutta, who brought two plays, Thakur Shri Ramakrishna and Baikunther Will, and an able company of actors. The credit for composing Thakur Shri Ramakrishna, round the story of Rani Rashmoni, and for bringing this legendary figure to life on the stage, goes to Molina Devi and Gurudas, who headed the company.... It is not easy to put across a religious theme, but Molina and Gurudas did so convincingly, helped greatly by the telling effects of light and music.

== Filmography ==
Gurudas Banerjee acted in more than 80 films, mostly in Bengali, as listed here (including year released, and role if available; all films in Bengali unless otherwise noted):

- Banglar Meye (1941)
- Swayamsiddha (1947) (Gobinda, Husband Of Chandi)
- Kalo Chhaya (1948)
- Ultorath (1949)
- Paribartan (1949)
- Mayajaal (1949)
- Kuasha (1949)
- Cartoon (1949)
- Vidyasagar (1950)
- Sree Tulsidas (1950)
- Sanchali (1950)
- Sahodar (1950)
- Kankantala Light Railway (1950)
- Jugadebata (1950)
- Gypsy Meye (1950)
- Apabad (1950)
- Ganyer Meye (1951)
- Bhakta Raghunath (1951)
- Bhairab Mantra (1951)
- Anandamath (1951)
- Vidyasagar (1952, Hindi)
- Sabitri Satyaban (1952)
- Nildarpan (1952)
- Mahishasur Badh (1952)
- Sanjibani (1952)
- Sarala (1953)
- Rami Chandidas (1953)
- Maharaja Nandakumar (1953)
- Bhagaban Srikrishna Chaitanya (1953)
- Sare Chuattar (1953) (Ramola's Father)
- Makarsar Jaal (1953)
- Shibashakti (1954)
- Sada Kalo (1954)
- Naa (1954)
- Rani Rasmani (film) (1955) (Sri Ramakrishna)
- Katha Kao (1955)
- Joy Maa Kali Boarding (1955)
- Chatujye Banrujye (1955)
- Atmadarshan (1955)
- Aparadhi (1955)
- Sajher Pradip (1955)
- Debatra (1955)
- Subholagna (1956)
- Sadhak Ramprasad (1956)
- Rajpath (1956)
- Mahakabi Girishchandra (1956) (Sri Ramakrishna)
- Bhola Master (1956)
- Asamapta (1956)
- Abhagir Swarga (1956)
- Ekti Raat (1956) (Jitu, Anita's Father)
- Tamasa (1957)
- Nilachale Mahaprabhu (1957)
- Ami Baro Habo (1957)
- Sree Sree Maa (1958)
- Sadhak Bamakshyapa (1958) (Sadhak Bamakhyapa)
- Purir Mandir (1958)
- Mejo Jamai (1958)
- Kangsa (1958)
- Jonakir Alo (1958)
- Indranath Srikanta O Annadadidi (1959) (Pishemashai)
- Abhishap (1959)
- Tailangaswami (1960)
- Nader Nimai (1960)
- Kono Ek Din (1960)
- Sadhak Kamalakanta (1961)
- Carey Saheber Munsi (1961)
- Taranisen Badh (1962)
- Bireswar Viveknanda (1964) (Sri Ramakrishna)
- Rup Sanatan (1965)
- Bharater Sadhak (1965)
- Debitirtha Kamrup Kamakshya (1967)
- Adyashakti Mahamayay (1968)
- Trinayani Maa (1971)
- Umno O Jhumno (1975)
- Swayamsiddha (1975)
- Mouchak (1975) (Neepa's Father)
- Agniswar (1975) (Agniswar's Father-in-law)
- Nagar Darpane (1975)
- Sree Sree Maa Lakshmi (1977)
- Baba Taraknath (1977)
- Jaal Sanyasi (1977)
- Joy Maa Tara (1978) (Sadhak Bamakhyapa)
- Balak Saratchandra (1978)
- Aguner Phulki (1978)
- Jato Mat Tato Path (1979) (Sri Ramakrishna)
- Dub De Mon Kali Bole (1979)
- Matribhakta Ramprasad (1980)
- Abhi (1980)
- Maa Bhabani Maa Amar (1982)
- Kshyapa Thakur (1987) (Mohanto baba)
- Bile Naren (1988)

=== Film table with references ===
Further details on selected films appear in the table below. Films known to be dubbed versions of other films have not been listed. Any films known to be multilinguals (separately filmed in multiple languages) are explicitly noted as multilinguals.

Year	Film title	Banerjee Role	Film director	Notes & Sources (DB=data base)
1950	Jugadebata	Sri Ramakrishna	Bidhayak Bhattacharya	Bengali; Sources: DBs, other
1950	Vidyasagar	Sri Ramakrishna	Kali Prasad Ghosh	Bengali; Sources: DBs, other
1952	Vidyasagar	Sri Ramakrishna	Kali Prasad Ghosh	Hindi; Sources: DBs
1955	Rani Rashmoni	Sri Ramakrishna	Kali Prasad Ghosh	Bengali; Sources: DBs Molina Devi as Rani Rashmoni
1958	Sadhak Bamakhyapa	Sadhak Bamakhyapa	Banshi Ash	Bengali; Sources: DBs
1956	Mahakavi Girish Chandra	Sri Ramakrishna	Madhu Bose	Bengali; Sources: DBs Pahari Sanyal as Girish Chandra Ghosh. The film won a 1956 Certificate of Merit.
1964	Bireswar Vivekananda	Sri Ramakrishna	Madhu Bose	Bengali; Sources: DBs Amaresh Das as Vivekananda
1979	Jata Mat Tata Path (As Many Views, As Many Ways)	Sri Ramakrishna	Gurudas Bagchi	Bengali; Sources: DBs

== Theatre roles ==
The following table chronicles Gurudas Banerjee's stage career. It is not complete.

Opening date	Title	Role	Location Calcutta unless otherwise specified	Playwright	Director	Notes and other cast
19 Nov. 1948	Jugadebata	Sri Ramakrishna	Kalika Theatre	Tarak Mukherjee		Source; Also Molina Debi (Rani Rashmoni)
1955	Thakur Sri Ramakrishna	Sri Ramakrishna	Minerva Theatre			Source; Also Molina Debi (Rani Rashmoni). Part of a state Congress celebration
1975	Nata Nati	Sri Ramakrishna	Rangana Theatre	Ganesh Mukherjee	Ganesh Mukherjee	Source; Kartick Banerjee (Girish Gose), Basanti Chaterjee (Binodini), Sudhangsu Maiti (Narendranath), and others. Over 300 performances
Oct. 1977	Rajadrohi	?	Rungmahal Theatre	Saradindu Banerjee		Source; Dilip Roy (hero), Lily Chakraverti (heroine)
