= Gautam Mukherjee =

Indian actor and director

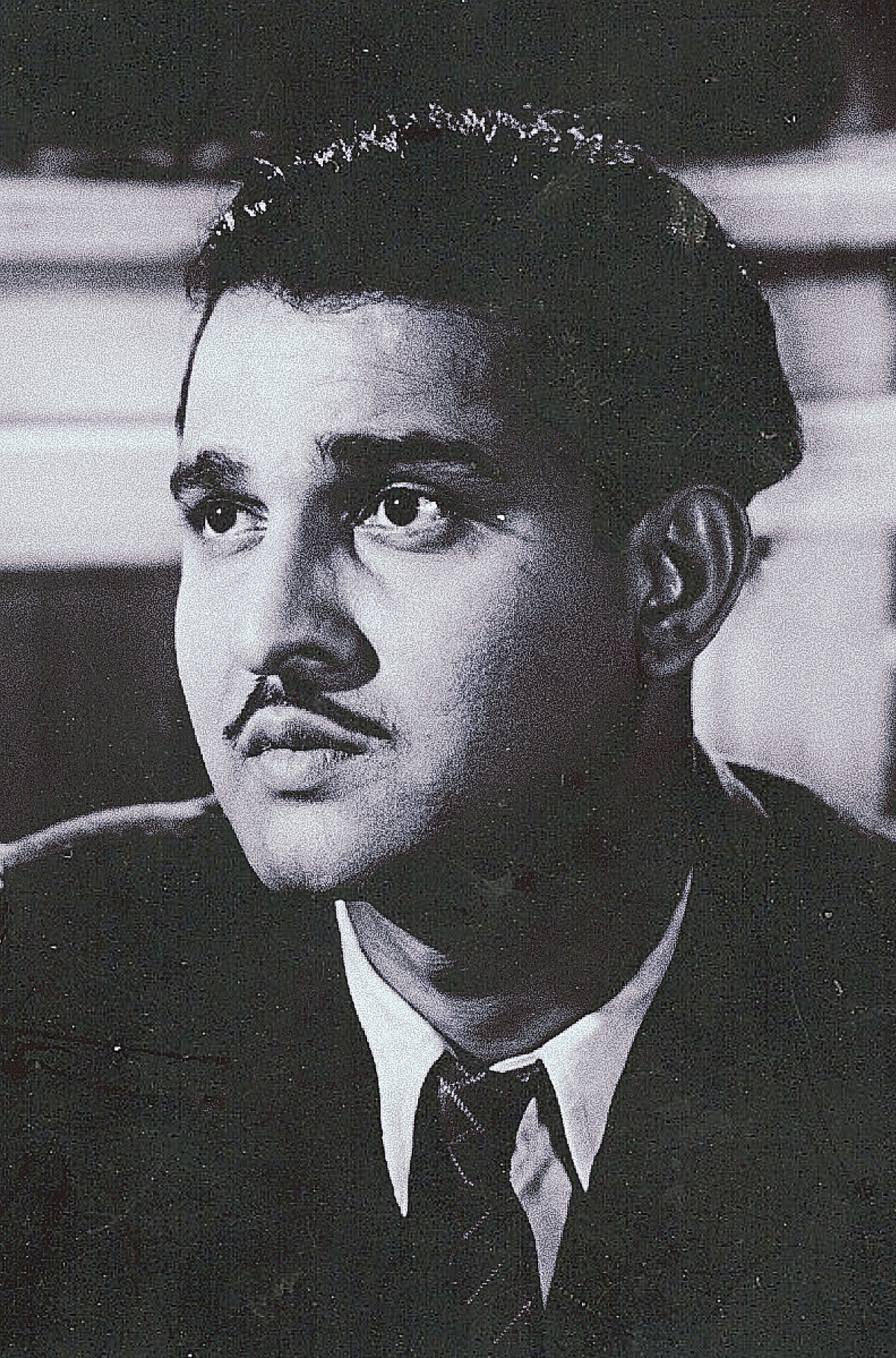
- Gautam Mukherjee in Jighansa (1951)
- Occupations: Actor; director
- Directorial debut: Troyee (1982)
- Notable work: Jighansa; Hanabari; Troyee
- Children: 1
- Father: Prabodh Chandra Mukherjee
- Relatives: Devi Mukherjee (brother); Bhaswar Chatterjee (grandnephew)

Gautam Mukherjee (also known as Gautam Mukhopadhyay) was an Indian actor and director who is known for his work in Bengali and Hindi cinema.

After Devi Mukherjee's death, he was roped in Gunamoy Banerjee's thriller Bish Bachhar Aage (1948) to enact the unfinished part his brother was supposed to play. Like his brother, he was also celebrated for his voice. He portrayed Indian revolutionary Nirmal Sen in Nirmal Chowdhury's Chattogram Astragar Lunthan (1949), Bhudeb Mukhopadhyay in Vidyasagar (1950), Bimal Ganguly in Jighansa (1951) and Jayanta Chowdhury in Hanabari (1952). He had an extensive career in Bollywood and was mostly typecast as a police officer in Hindi films. He also became a part of a number of plays staged by Uttar Sarathi, a Calcutta-based theatre group. His directorial debut Troyee (1982) starring Mithun Chakraborty and Debashree Roy became the highest-grossing film of the year.

== Career ==
When Devi Mukherjee committed suicide, Gunamoy Banerjee's Bengali thriller Bish Bachhar Aage (1948) was on the floor. The film was based on Bidhayak Bhattacharya's Bengali play of the same name. Gunamoy Banerjee insisted Gautam to enact the unfinished part left by his brother. He portrayed Indian revolutionary Nirmal Sen in Nirmal Chowdhury's Chattogram Astragar Lunthan (1949) which depicted the Chittagong armoury raid. He portrayed Bhudeb Mukhopadhyay in Kaliprasad Ghosh's social drama film Vidyasagar (1950). He portrayed Detective Bimal Ganguly in Ajoy Kar's Jighansa (1951). He played Jayanta Chowdhury in Premendra Mitra's Hanabari (1952) which became a massive box office success. The story follows Jayanta, Srimanta and Lalita.

His directorial debut Troyee (1982) starring Mithun Chakraborty and Debashree Roy became the highest-grossing film of the year.

== Filmography ==
Year	Title	Role	Actor	Director	Ref.
1948	Bish Bachhar Aage		Yes		
1948	Shyamaler Swapno		Yes		
1949	Chattogram Astragar Lunthan	Nirmal Sen	Yes		
1949	Diner Par Din		Yes		
1949	Putul Nacher Itikatha		Yes		
1949	Swami		Yes		
1950	Digbhranta		Yes		
1950	Vidyasagar	Bhudev Mukhopadhyay	Yes		
1951	Chiner Putul		Yes		
1951	Jighansa	Bimal Ganguly	Yes		
1951	Nastanirh		Yes		
1951	Sahajatri		Yes		
1952	Hanabari	Jayanta Chowdhury	Yes		
1955	Faraar	Bipin	Yes		
1958	Detective	Police officer	Yes		
1959	Insan Jaag Utha	Police officer	Yes		
1960	Singapore		Yes		
1962	Bombay Ka Chor		Yes		
1962	China Town		Yes		
1969	Aansoo Ban Gaye Phool		Yes		
1969	Do Bhai		Yes		
1969	Yakeen	Mr. Shrivastava	Yes		
1971	Door Ki Rahi	Police officer	Yes		
1972	Bees Saal Pehle		Yes		
1973	Samjhauta				
1977	Joy		Yes		
1982	Troyee			Yes	
1985	Phoolan Devi	Police commissioner	Yes		
1986	Dui Adhyay			Yes	

== Bibliography ==
- Bhanu Banerjee (2018). Bhanu Samagra (in Bengali). Patrabharati. ISBN 9788183744751.
- Gouranga Prasad Ghosh (1982). Sonar Dag (in Bengali). Vol. 1. Yogomaya Prakashani. ASIN B0B5RM7D37.
- Sankalan, Anandabazar Patrika (2013). Anandasangi (in Bengali). Vol. 1. Ananda Publishers. ISBN 978-8172153793.
- Dashgupta, Biplab (1993). Nandan.
