= Krishnakanter Will =

Krishnakanter Will may refer to:

- Krishnakanter Will (1926 film)
- Krishnakanter Will (1932 film)
