= Hanabari =

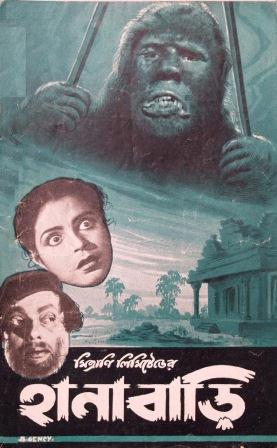
- Theatrical poster of Hanabari
- Directed by: Premendra Mitra
- Screenplay by: Premendra Mitra
- Produced by: Fakhrul Islam Khan
- Starring: Bipin Mukherjee; Gautam Mukherjee; Pranati Ghosh; Dhiraj Bhattacharya
- Cinematography: Anil Gupta
- Edited by: Baidyanath Banerjee
- Production company: Mitrani Limited
- Distributed by: Indian United Pictures Ltd.
- Release date: 13 June 1952
- Running time: 112 minutes
- Country: India
- Language: Bengali

Hanabari (transl. The Haunted House) is a 1952 Indian Bengali black and white thriller film written and directed by Premendra Mitra. It stars Bipin Mukherjee, Gautam Mukherjee, Pranati Ghosh, Dhiraj Bhattacharya, Biren Mitra, Shashanka Som and Mita Chatterjee. The music of the film was composed by Pabitra Chattapadhyaya. The film received mixed review from critics.

== Synopsis ==
A young man named Jayanta runs away from a haunted house and takes shelter in a nearby home. This is the house of Shrimanta, an artist. Jayanta tells the artist that he had been driving until his car broke down. He entered a house on Diamond Harbour Road, Kolkata where he faced a horrible creature that tried to kill him. Together, the two men go to the police station. The police inspector informs them that they are aware of the mystery. Afterwards, a man buys the house and lives there with his nieces, Lalita and Namita. Jayanta knows the family personally as he had a relationship with Lalita when they were in Burma.

He started an investigation and went to the House broker agency 'Bag and Nag' to know the history of the house. He decided to stay there for the security of the family and to solve the mystery. Surprisingly, a beggar moves around the house every day.

One night Jayanta, Shrimanta and the police find the ghostly creature and fire at it to no avail. The matter becomes more complicated when a piece of paper is discovered by Lalita's uncle that appears to be a clue to a hidden treasure. Jayanta suspects that Shrimanta is related to the matter. In the meantime, someone tries to kill Lalita's uncle and the police arrest Jayanta. Finally, it is revealed that all murder and ghostly atmosphere created by the real culprit for the treasure.

== Cast ==
- Bipin Mukherjee as Srimanta Sarkar
- Gautam Mukherjee as Jayanta Chowdhury
- Pranati Ghosh as Lolita
- Mita Chatterjee as Namita
- Dhiraj Bhattacharya as Detective alias beggar
- Shyam Laha as Mr. Bag
- Nabadwip Haldar as Mr Nag
