= Mita Chatterjee =

Indian singer and actress (born 1936)

- Chatterjee in the 1963 film Chaya Surya.

Background information
- Born: Namita Chattopadhyay; August 22, 1936 (age 90); Kolkata, West Bengal, India
- Origin: Kolkata
- Occupations: Singer; actress

Mita Chatterjee (born August 22, 1936; birth name Namita Chattopadhyay) is an Indian actress, singer and writer who primarily works in Bengali music and cinema. She was born in 1936 in Kolkata (Calcutta), West Bengal in India. Chatterjee is known for her acting credits in Bengali cinema and her songs in multiple languages, besides occasionally writing newspaper articles and magazines. Also known for singing cover versions of songs originally performed by singer Asha Bhosle, the original Bengali songs "Palki Te Bou Chole Jai" and "Gold Printer Sari Pore" sung by her emerged as Chatterjee's most popular songs, primarily played in West Bengal during Durga Puja.

Chatterjee was the youngest girl child of her parents, born as Namita Chattopadhyay. In her early life, she was influenced by music, learning music, dance and acting while still in school. She frequently performed in theaters and radio, of which in Phire Pawa was one of her earliest radio performances. She made her debut in Bengali cinema around 1940 or 1944 as a child actor, where Chatterjee acted in her first films by assistance from her father's friend. She changed her name from Namita Chattopadhyay to Mita Chattopadhyay (Chatterjee) after formally starting her acting career. Her best-known role was in the Bengali television show Janmabhoomi, where her played the role of pishima. She later wrote an autobiography titled Smritir Patay Patay published in 2024.

== Acting career ==
Mita Chatterjee was born on August 22, 1936, in Kolkata, West Bengal. She was born to J. C. Chatterjee and Pratima Chatterjee and was their youngest girl child. She was influenced by music in her early life, which motivated her to become a singer. She was known by her birth name Namita Chattopadhyay in her early life, which she kept till her acting, pursuing music, dance, acting while still in school, being encouraged by her father J. C. Chatterjee. She took training in music from Rajen Basu and her dancing from Mani Shankar. Chatterjee also performed in theater and radio, some of which were broadcast in Kolkatan radio stations, such as the Yuva Vani radio which was broadcast in the morning, after getting exposure in the field from her practicing. Phire Pawa was among her earliest performances on radio, broadcast by radio Akashvani. She was praised for her performances during this time.

Chatterjee made her debut in Bengali cinema in 1940 or 1944. She entered the cinema world with assistance from a friend of J. C. Chatterjee. Her father's friend approached J. C. Chatterjee to take permission to let her act in films. Chatterjee told her that if she could act, then he would let her do it. She acted in Bengali films for about seven decades starting from 1944. Her father did not interfere in her career. In 2024, Chatterjee said that was still physically fit from experience in her acting career. Chatterjee's acting gave her skill for shooting rifles and riding horses, which she used to do before. Chatterjee's primary acting fields were in theaters, radio dramas, films and television serials and shows. She became widely known for playing the role of a pishima in the Kolkata-based show Janmabhoomi, aired on Doordarshan, being one of the oldest actors in the serial until it was discontinued. Her notable acting credits for films include Hanabari, Ek Tukra Agun, Annapurnar Mandir, Biyer Phool, Beadap and many others.

Chatterjee became best known as an actor from her role in Janmabhoomi, in which she acted for seven-and-a-half years. She was initially called in to act for 6 days of shooting, but later got a permanent role in it. According to Ei Samay, the actors in it used to shoot for about 10 hours per day. Chatterjee described the shooting of the show in which she acted to be very healthy environment, with moderate competition. She stated that most of the actors including her wanted to act in it despite the time and difficulties faced. Chatterjee watched programs on TV after the show was discontinued. She later wrote an autobiography titled Smritir Patay Patay. In 2026, Bhaswar Chatterjee, an actor from the same serial took pictures with her that was organized by WBMPAF and others.

== Singing career ==
In her Bengali singing career, Chatterjee became known for performing covers of songs that were originally sung by playback singer and musician Asha Bhosle. This led to her becoming known as an Asha konthi (a person who sings songs originally performed by Asha Bhosle in her style). She gained many hit songs by performing cover versions of Bhosle, whose Bengali songs were often written by lyricists like Swapan Chakraborty and Gauriprasanna Mazumder. In response to this, Chatterjee commented: "There is nothing insulting about singing Ashaji's [Asha Bhosle's] songs. But it sometimes felt like a certain stamp or label was attached to it from singing her songs. I never imitate her voice, I just follow her singing style."

Chatterjee's best known song is "Palki Te Bou Chole Jai", first released in 1993. She remarked that when the song was originally released in 1993, it did not gain popularity, and the record label went out of business. But later in 2000, Chatterjee sang for another company, at when "Palki Te Bou Chole Jai" was re-released. It became famous from being played in wedding ceremonies, being centered around a wedding and a palanquin. According to Chatterjee, her family told her that singing Bhosle's song was good and innocuous, but also asked her to sing her own songs. In a conversation, she said that once she met Bhosle in a hall, and felt as an unforgettable experience. The success of "Palki Te Bou Chole Jai" prompted the removal of the Asha konthi label from Chatterjee.

Another song among Chatterjee's hit songs was "Gold Printer Sari Pore", which is a popular song played during the Durga Puja festival in West Bengal centering around themes about Durga Puja, saris and nostalgia. It is frequently played in multiple pandals while Durga Puja lasts. Chatterjee performed many Puja programs before, but she stopped performing them by 2024.
