= Syeda Sakina Islam =

Bangladeshi politician (1928-2008)

Member of the Bangladesh Parliament for Reserved Women's Seat-13
- In office 2 April 1979 – 6 December 1987
- Preceded by: Momtaz Begum

Personal details
- Born: 7 October 1928 Kolkata, Bengal Presidency, British India
- Died: 21 August 2008 (aged 79)
- Party: Bangladesh Nationalist Party (1979-1986); Jatiya Party (Ershad) (from 1986)
- Spouse: Fakhrul Islam Khan
- Parent: Syed Badrudduja (father)
- Relatives: Syeda Razia Faiz (sister); Hashem Ali Khan (father-in-law)
- Education: Lady Brabourne College

Syeda Sakina Islam (7 October 1928 – 21 August 2008) was a Bangladeshi politician. She served as a member of the Jatiya Sangsad for two terms. She was elected as a member of parliament from Bangladesh Nationalist Party in 1979 and on 1986 from Jatiya Party. She was the founding editor of Barisal Ladies Club, and a volunteer member of Azad Hind.

== Early life and education ==
Islam was born on 7 October 1928 in Kolkata. She belonged to a Bengali Muslim family of Syeds originally from the village of Talibpur in Murshidabad. Her father, Syed Badrudduja, was a mayor of Kolkata and a member of the Bengal Legislative Assembly and India's Lok Sabha, and her mother was Zaynab Begum. She had 10 siblings, including politician Syeda Razia Faiz. Islam is a graduate of Lady Brabourne College.

== Work ==
Islam served as a member of parliament for two terms. In 1979, she was elected from Barisal and Bhola District. In 1986, she was elected from Barishal, Jhalkathi District and Pirojpur District. Islam served as the vice chairman of Jatiya Party's central ladies group and Chairperson of Bangladesh Jatiyo Mohila Songstha (Bairsal District). Islam was the first female member of the speaker panel of Bangladesh Parliament, Jatiya Sangsad.

In 1977, as a commissioner of Barisal Pourosova, she attended the Asian Women Conference. She also attended World Women Development Conference in 1978. She accompanied President Ziaur Rahman at the Commonwealth Heads of Government Meeting 1979 held in Lusaka, Zambia.

== Personal life ==
Islam was married to the journalist and playwright Fakhrul Islam Khan (1925–2007). The couple had one son, Amirul Islam Khan Bulbul, and two daughters, Shabnam Wadud Kaya and Saguafa Khanam Joardar.
