= Kuasha =

- কুয়াশা
- Directed by: Premendra Mitra
- Written by: Premendra Mitra
- Starring: Kanu Banerjee; Chhaya Devi; Gurudas Banerjee; Nabadwip Halder
- Music by: Kalipada Sen
- Production company: Mahabharati Limited
- Release date: 19 August 1949
- Running time: 90 Min
- Country: India
- Language: Bengali

Kuasha (The fog) is a Bengali thriller film directed by Premendra Mitra based on his own novel. This movie was released under the banner of Mahabharati Limited on 19 August 1949.

== Cast ==
- Dhiraj Bhattacharya
- Nripati Chattopadhyay
- Kanu Banerjee
- Gurudas Banerjee
- Chhaya Devi
- Nabadwip Haldar
- Rajlakhsmi Devi
- Shisir Batabyal
- Joynarayan Mukherjee
- Shipra Mitra
- Ganesh Chandra Goswami
- Dhiraj Das
