= Jighansa =

1951 Bengali thriller film by Ajoy Kar

- Directed by: Ajoy Kar
- Screenplay by: Ajoy Kar
- Dialogues by: Manoranjan Ghosh; Hiren Nag
- Story by: Hemendra Kumar Roy
- Based on: Nishithini Bibhishika (Note: Nishithini Bibhishika is a Bengali adaptation of The Hound of the Baskervilles by Arthur Conan Doyle) by Hemendra Kumar Roy
- Starring: Biren Chatterjee; Manju Dey; Shishir Batabyal; Gautam Mukherjee; Bikash Roy; Kamal Mitra; Kanu Banerjee
- Cinematography: Ajoy Kar; Bimal Mukherjee
- Edited by: Santosh Ganguly
- Music by: Hemant Kumar
- Production companies: Choyanika Chitramandir; Kine Crafts Studio
- Distributed by: Kinema Exchange Ltd.
- Release date: 20 April 1951
- Running time: 112 minutes
- Country: India
- Language: Bengali

Jighansa (Bengali: জিঘাংসা, /dʒɪˈɡʰɑnsɑ/ transl. A Desire to Kill) is a 1951 Bengali-language psychological thriller film cinematographed and directed by Ajoy Kar. Produced by Chayanika Chitramandir and Kine Craft Studios, the film is based on Hemendra Kumar Roy's novel Nishithini Bibhishika, which itself is a Bengali adaptation of Arthur Conan Doyle's crime novel The Hound of the Baskervilles (1902). It stars Shishir Batabyal as the eponymous detective Smarajit Sen and Gautam Mukherjee as his assistant Bimal Ganguly. Biren Chatterjee, Manju Dey, Bikash Roy, Kamal Mitra and Kanu Banerjee star in pivotal roles.

It was released on 20 April 1951. It had musical scores done by Hemant Kumar.

== Plot ==
The movie revolves around the unwanted incidents that happen in the princely state of Ratnagarh. After the murder of the king Chandrakanta, Dr. Palit asks for help from Detective Smarajit Sen, a family friend. Detective Sen sends his assistant Bimal to Ratnagarh to investigate and ascertain the security of young Kumar Bahadur, the new successor of the royal family of the estate. They observe that a mysterious lady, Manjushree, sings uncanny song while wandering around the adjacent water body. Mr. Gupta, a suspicious botanist, who stays in the neighbourhood also roams in that locality. It is revealed that he was deprived of real property of the royal family and took revenge by killing the members of the family. He uses a deaf and dumb porter as a hired killer. Ultimately, he is killed by the detective at the end before he could commit another murder.

== Cast ==
- Sisir Batabyal as Smarajit Sen
- Gautam Mukherjee as Bimal Ganguly
- Biren Chattopadhyay as Suryakanta Roy a.k.a Kumar Bahadur
- Manju Dey as Manjushree
- Bikash Roy as Mr. Gupta
- Kamal Mitra as Dr. Palit
- Kanu Banerjee as Lakkhan
- Santosh Sinha
- Dhiraj Das
- Kalipada Sarkar
- Pannalal Chakraborty
- Pushpa Debi
- Romola Chowdhuri
- Sushama Ghosh

== Accolades ==
Year	Title	Category	Recipient	Result	Ref.
1952	BFJA Award	Best Actor	Biren Chatterjee	Won	

== Remake ==
Year	Title	Language	Director	Cast	Ref.
1962	Bees Saal Baad	Hindi	Biren Nag		
