= Giribala =

1929 film

Giribala is a Bengali silent drama film directed by Madhu Bose based on the same name short story of Rabindranath Tagore. This film's name was initially Manbhanjan, which was changed to Giribala by the suggestion of Tagore himself. The movie was released on 15 February 1929 under the banner of Madan Theatre. Tagore was present at the first show of the film and he expressed his satisfaction towards the movie Giribala.

== Cast ==
- Dhiraj Bhattacharya
- Naresh Mitra
- Ahindra Choudhury
- Tinkari Chakraborty
- Lilabati
- Shantl Gupta
- Lalita Devi
