= Indranath Srikanta O Annadadidi =

Bengali film

Indranath Srikanta O Annadadidi is a Bengali drama film directed by Haridas Bhattacharya and produced by Kanan Devi. It was based on a part of the famous novel Srikanta by Sarat Chandra Chattopadhyay. The film was released on 3 October 1959 under the banner of Sreemati Pictures.

== Plot ==
Annada, brought up in a conservative middle-class family in a village, elopes with a snake charmer, Sahuji. Her husband tortures her regularly, but Annada remains loyal to him. Young Srikanta treats her like his elder sister Didi. Srikanta often visits her with his daredevil and adventurous friend Indranath. When Annada's husband dies, she leaves the village permanently.

== Cast ==
- Bikash Roy as Sahuji
- Gurudas Banerjee as Pisemosai
- Partha Pratim Chowdhury as Indranath
- Kanan Devi as Annada
- Molina Devi
- Sajal Ghosh as Srikanta
