= Rani Rasmani (film) =

1955 film by Kali Prasad Ghosh

Rani Rasmani (transl. Queen Rashmani) is a Bengali historical drama film directed by Kali Prasad Ghosh based on the real-life story of Rani Rasmani. This film was released on 11 February 1955 under the banner of Chalachchitra Pratisthan. Actress Molina Devi played the title role of the movie.

== Plot ==
The movie revolves around the real-life story of Rani Rasmani. Rasmani was brought up in a lower-middle-class family of Kolkata. She marries Rajchandra Das. After the death of her husband the courageous lady takes charge of the zamindari and business and proves herself as an effective leader. She struggles against the evil elements of the society.

== Cast ==
- Molina Devi as Rasmani
- Chhabi Biswas as Babu Rajchandra
- Asit Baran
- Bhanu Bandyopadhyay
- Pahari Sanyal
- Gurudas Banerjee as Sriramkrishna
- Utpal Dutt
- Jiben Bose
- Shikharani Bag as Baby Rasmani
- Anup Kumar
- Bibhu Bhattacharya
- Nitish Mukhopadhyay
- Moni Srimani
- Haridhan Mukhopadhyay
- Mihir Bhattacharya
- Nibhanani Debi
