= Mrinalini (1930 film) =

- Directed by: Jyotish Bandyopadhyay
- Written by: Bankim Chandra Chattopadhyay
- Starring: Durgadas Bannerjee; Dhiraj Bhattacharya; Ahindra Choudhury
- Distributed by: Madan Theatre
- Release date: 27 December 1930
- Country: India
- Language: Silent (Bengali intertitles)

Mrinalini is a silent drama film directed by Jyotish Bandyopadhyay based on Bankim Chandra Chattopadhyay's famous 1869 novel Mrinalini. This film was released on 27 December 1930 under the banner of Madan Theatre.

== Plot ==
The film is set against the backdrop of the era ruled by Muhammad Bakhtiyar Khalji in Bengal. The plot revolves with the life of Hemchandra, the prince of Magadha, who seeks to liberate his homeland. Hemchandra is in love with Mrinalini, a young woman from Mathura.

== Cast ==
- Durgadas Bannerjee as Hemchandra
- Dhiraj Bhattacharya
- Ahindra Choudhury
- Phani Burma
- Naresh Mitra
- Jaynarayan Mukherjee
- Kalipada Das
