= Fakhrul Islam Khan =

- Born: 9 February 1925; Barisal, Bengal Presidency, British India
- Died: 13 May 2007 (aged 82)
- Occupations: Journalist, film producer and director
- Spouse: Syeda Sakina Islam

Fakhrul Islam Khan (known as FI Khan; 9 February 1925 – 13 May 2007) was a Bangladeshi editor, journalist, cultural organizer, playwright, producer, and director. He was the editor of Gulistan (1950), a monthly Bengali magazine, and Kadem (1966), a weekly magazine. He was the joint news editor with Shah Azizur Rahman of the monthly magazine Inqilab (published from Kolkata). Khan has made a special contribution to Barisal's cultural activities, cultural heritage, literary councils, journalism and Barisal Press Club. He was the first Bengal Muslim film producer. He established Barisal Natya Niketan in 1964.

== Early life and education ==
Khan was born on 9 February 1925, to Bengali Muslim parents Hashem Ali Khan and Samisun Nesa in Barisal. The family hailed from the village of Sehangal in Swarupkathi, Firozpur. His father was a social worker, politician, and member of the cabinet led by Sher-e-Bangla A K Fazlul Huq in 1941. Khan started his education at AK School in Barisal and later was admitted to Ripon School & College in Kolkata. He led several student movements. He was the editor of a magazine in Ripon School, for which he also wrote.

== Career ==
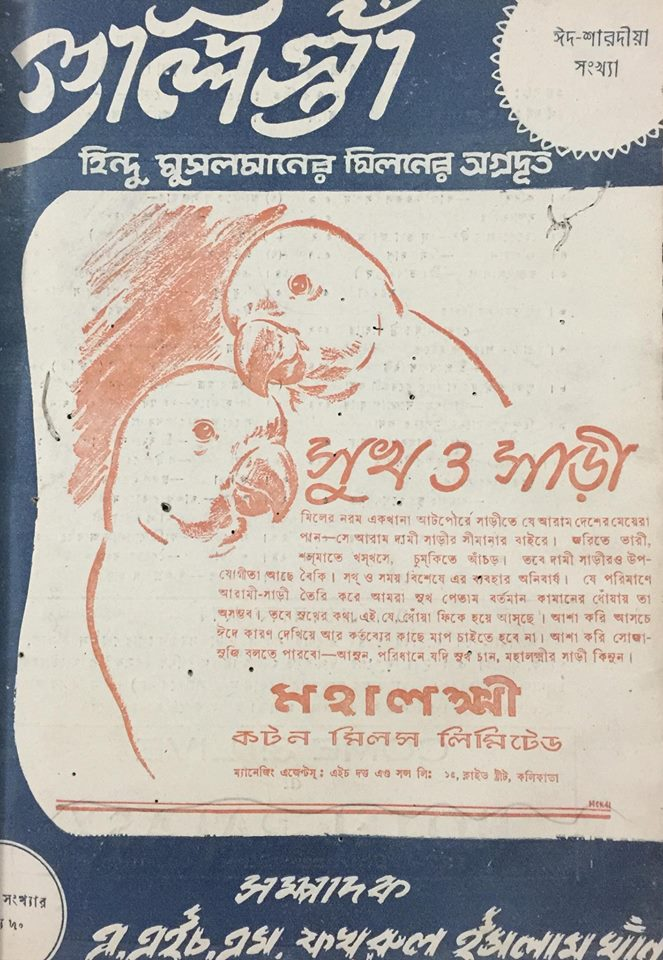
Cover of the Eid-puja issue of Gulistan, edited by Khan

Khan was an assistant director on Premendra Mitra's 1948 film Kalo Chhaya.

He was the editor of the Bengali monthly Gulistan. Syed Akram Hossain wrote, "By observing the list of writers of the 'Gulistan', one could feel the aristocracy, wideness and importance of the journal in the contemporary period".

== Personal life ==
Khan was married to Syeda Sakina Islam (1928–2008), a member of the 2nd and 3rd Jatiya Sangsad. The couple had one son, Amirul Islam Khan Bulbul, and two daughters, Shabnam Wadud Keya and Shagufa Khanam Joardar.
