= Mahakavi Kalidas (1942 film) =

- Directed by: Niren Lahiri
- Starring: Menaka Devi; Padmadevi
- Music by: Hariprasanna Das
- Production company: Motimal Theaters
- Release date: 1942
- Country: India
- Language: Hindi

Mahakavi Kalidas is a Bollywood film directed by Niren Lahiri. It was released in 1942.

== Plot ==
After falling in love with a woman from a lower caste, a naive Sanskrit poet who was ostracized now encounters obstacles when he participates in a competition against a princess.

== Cast ==
- Karuna Banerjee
- Chhabi Biswas
- Menaka Devi
- Padmadevi
