= Arabian Nights (1946 film) =

- Directed by: Niren Lahiri
- Based on: One Thousand and One Nights
- Starring: Kanan Devi; Molina Devi; Robin Majumdar
- Music by: Kamal Dasgupta
- Production company: P. R. Productions
- Release date: 1946
- Country: India
- Language: Hindi

Arabian Nights is a Hindi fantasy adventure film directed by Niren Lahiri inspired by the stories of One Thousand and One Nights. The film was released in India in 1946 under the banner of P. R. Productions. The music was composed by Kamal Dasgupta.

== Cast ==
- Kanan Devi as Salma
- Molina Devi
- Robin Majumdar as Mansur
- Hiralal
- Sunder
- Devi Mukherjee
- Nawab
