= Sharey Chuattor =

1953 film by Nirmal Dey

- Directed by: Nirmal Dey
- Screenplay by: Nirmal Dey
- Story by: Bijon Bhattacharya
- Starring: Uttam Kumar; Tulsi Chakraborty; Molina Devi; Suchitra Sen; Bhanu Bandopadhyay; Jahor Roy; Nabadwip Haldar
- Cinematography: Amal Das
- Edited by: Kali Raha
- Music by: Kalipodo Sen
- Production company: M.P Production Pvt Ltd
- Release date: 20 February 1953
- Country: India
- Language: Bengali

Sharey Chuattor (Bengali: সাড়ে চুয়াত্তর, lit. 'Seventy-four and a Half') is a 1953 Indian Bengali-language comedy film, directed by Nirmal Dey, based on a novel by Bijon Bhattacharya. The film stars Tulsi Chakraborty and Molina Devi in the lead and co-stars Uttam Kumar, Suchitra Sen, Bhanu Bandopadhyay, Jahor Roy and Nabadwip Haldar. Contemporary playback singers like Dhananjay, Dwijen Mukherjee, Shyamal Mitra, and Manabendra Mukherjee also acted in this film. This film was under the banner of M.P Production Pvt Ltd.

== Plot ==
The Annapurna Boarding House owned by Rajanibabu (Tulsi Chakraborty) is a peaceful abode where the residents are all friendly except Shibbabu (Haridhan Mukherjee), a senior learned man, who sometimes acts as a killjoy. The story begins when Romola (Suchitra Sen), a relative of Rajanibabu and her family comes to stay in the boarding, after being thrown out of their rented house. Rajanibabu calls a meeting where all the residents except Shibbabu cast vote in favour of Romola's staying.

Rampriti (Uttam Kumar), the son of a wealthy family, who also stays at the boarding, is away home. On the day of his return, he telephones Annapurna Boarding to inform the cook Modon (Nabadwip Haldar) to prepare food for him that night. Seeing no one to answer the phone, Romola picks it up, but Rampriti does not believe that there's a girl in the boarding and so an exchange of hot words takes place. Rampriti, after returning narrates the incident to Kedar (Bhanu Bandopadhyay), another resident of the Boarding. Romola overhears them and berates Rampriti, silencing him.

However, they fall in love and exchange love letters, but this fact becomes known to the other residents and they start teasing both of them. Rajanibabu, the go-between, is given a love letter to deliver but as he's hurrying to catch the train home, he keeps it in his pocket. At home, he quarrels with his wife (Molina Devi) and leaves the house in the middle of night. His wife manages to find the love letter and thinks that her husband is running an extramarital affair.

Seeing that Romola and Rampriti are in love, Rajanibabu makes the marriage arrangements for them and calls Rampriti's and Romola's father.
Rajanibabu's wife prepares a puja to bring him back. She becomes impatient and goes to the Boarding House. She charges her husband of infidelity and drags him to another room where Rajanibabu tells her the truth about the letter. He says, it is about Rampriti and Romola, the couple who are getting married the very day. The residents make fun of them and the film ends with Rampriti and Romola sitting side-by-side at the marriage altar.

== Cast ==
| Cast | Character |
|---|---|
| Uttam Kumar | Rampriti |
| Tulsi Chakraborty | Rajanibabu, Owner of the Boarding House |
| Molina Devi | Rajanibabu's wife |
| Suchitra Sen | Romola |
| Bhanu Bandopadhyay | Kedar |
| Jahor Roy | Kamakhya |
| Nabadwip Haldar | Modon |
| Gurudas Bannerjee | Romala's father |
| Padma Devi | Ramala's mother |
| Haridhan Mukherjee | Shib babu |
| Ajit Chattopadhyay | Resident at the mess |
| Sital Bannerjee | Resident at the mess |
| Dhananjay Bhattacharya | Akhil Babu |
| Panchanan Bhattacharya | Elderly resident at the mess |
| Reba Bose | |
| Shyamal Mitra | Resident at the mess |
| Manabendra Mukhopadhyay | Resident at the mess, Singer |
| Sanat Singha | Resident at the mess |
| Shyam Laha | Resident at the mess |
| Ranjit Roy | Resident at the mess |

== Music ==
Sharey Chuattor

Soundtrack album by Kalipada Sen
- Released: 1953
- Recorded: 1952
- Studio: M.P Production Pvt Ltd
- Genre: Feature film soundtrack
- Length: 0:08:21
- Label: Angel Digital Pvt Ltd

All lyrics are written by Sailen Roy; all music is composed by Kalipodo Sen.

Songs
| No. | Title | Playback | Length |
|---|---|---|---|
| 1. | "Amar Ei Jouban - Chorus" | Shyamal Mitra, Manabendra Mukhopadhyay, Dwijen Mukherjee, Dhananjay Bhattacharya, Pannalal Bhattacharya, Sanat Singha | 3:16 |
| 2. | "Emon Maya Promonchomoy" | Dhananjay Bhattacharya | 3:18 |
| 3. | "Dio Go Basite Bhalo" | Sandhya Mukherjee | 1:47 |
| Total length: | | | 08:21 |

== Reception ==
Legendary Satyajit Ray stated this film as one of the best comedy film in the talkie era of Bengali Cinema, with tight screenplay and the good direction of Nirmal Dey. The film marked for first time pairing Uttam Kumar and Suchitra Sen in a film. The Times of India called the film, "one of the best Bengali old comedy movies which is still a must-watch."

This was the first Bengali film released in Paradise theater which was known as A listed cinema hall. After the success of Basu Paribar this film established Uttam Kumar in the film industry. The film become blockbuster hit and ran for 105 days and in a single theater it's ran a record 63 weeks. This film become highest-grossing film in 1953 and one of the biggest hits in 1950s.
