= Moyla Kagaj =

1954 film directed by Premendra Mitra

Moyla Kagaj (English: The Dirty Paper) is a Bengali social drama film directed by Premendra Mitra. This film was released in 1954 under the banner of Mitrani Limited.

== Cast ==
- Anil Chatterjee
- Dhiraj Bhattacharya
- Nripati Chattopadhyay
- Tulsi Chakraborty
- Nabadwip Haldar
- Sabitri Chatterjee
- Sukhen Das
- Tripti Mitra
- Dhiraj Das
- Manjusree Chattopadhyay
