= Pramatha Nath Bose =

Indian geologist and paleontologist

- প্রমথনাথ বসু
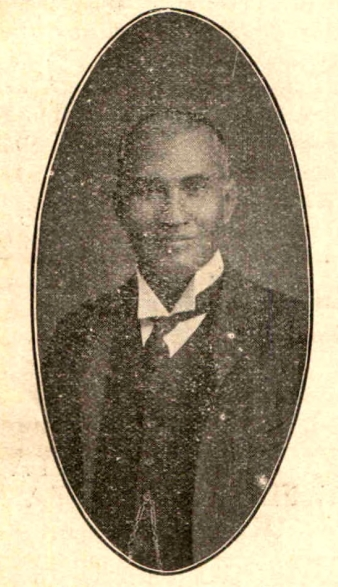
- P N Bose in 1913
- Born: 12 May 1855; Gobardanga, North 24 Parganas district, Bengal Presidency, British India
- Died: 27 April 1934 (aged 79); Calcutta, Bengal Presidency, British India
- Other name: P.N.Bose
- Education: Krishnagar Government College, St. Xavier's College
- Occupations: Geologist, Social workers, Paleontologist
- Organization: Geological Survey of India
- Known for: Paleontology
- Spouse: Kamala Dutta (m.24 July 1882)
- Children: Madhu Bose (Son)
- Parent: Taraprasanna Bose (Father)

Pramatha Nath Bose (12 May 1855 – 1934) was a pioneering Indian geologist and paleontologist. Bose was educated at Krishnagar Government College and later at St. Xavier's College of the University of Calcutta when he obtained a Gilchrist scholarship to study in London in 1874. He graduated in 1877 and went on to study at the Royal School of Mines in London and excelled in biology and paleontology. During his study at Cambridge he became a friend of Rabindranath Tagore. He was one of the early Indians to join the Geological Survey of India as a graded officer. His initial work was on the Siwalik fossils. He is credited with the setting up of the first soap factory in India and was instrumental in the setting up of Jamshedpur by writing to J. N. Tata about the rich iron ore reserves.

== Biography ==
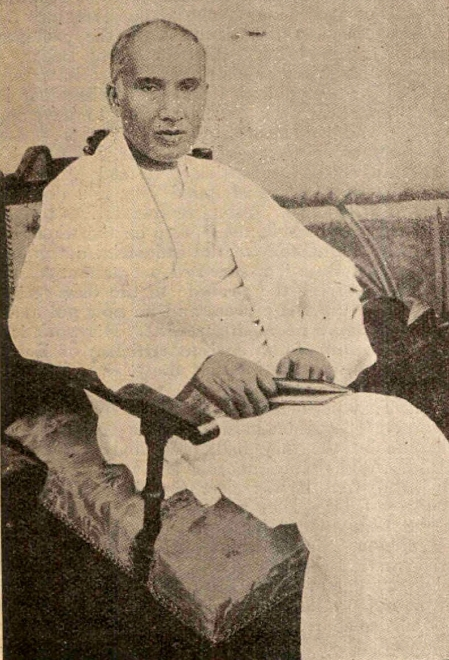
Pramatha Nath Bose (The Modern Review, February 1941)

Born on 12 May 1855 in a remote village of Gaipur, near Gobardanga, in 24 Parganas district, West Bengal, geologist PN Bose graduated in science from London University and passed out from the Royal School of Mines the following year in 1878. During his years as geologist, he discovered iron ore mines in Dhulli and Rajhara in Madhya Pradesh. The most outstanding achievement of his life was the discovery of iron ore deposits in the hills of Gorumahisani in the state of Mayurbhanj. Following the discovery, PN Bose wrote a letter to JN Tata on 24 February 1904, which led to the establishment of Tata Iron and Steel Company at Sakchi.

Bose has several firsts to his credit. He was the first Indian graduate in science from a British University; first to discover petroleum in Assam; first to set up a soap factory in India and also the first to introduce micro sections as an aid to petrological work. He was also the first Indian to hold a graded position in the Geological Survey of India where he served with distinction. As a man of science, he had constantly taken up the cause of technical education in the country. His efforts also catalysed the foundation of the Bengal Technical Institute which is better known as the Jadavpur University today of which Bose was the first honorary principal.

Pramatha Nath married Kamala Dutt, daughter of Romesh Chunder Dutt, a President of the Congress party and an Indian civil servant, economic historian and writer, on 24 July 1882. One of his Sons Director Madhu Bose was married to actress - dancer Sadhana Sen, later Sadhana Bose (Grand daughter of Keshab Chandra Sen). A grandson of Pramatha Nath Bose is Indian Filmmaker Amit Bose. Another, son Raja Bose, also became a Geologist.

=== Milestones of his life ===
12 May 1855: Pramatha Nath Bose was born on in Gaipur, a village near Gobardanga, in the district of North 24 Parganas, West Bengal. Recalling his early childhood in Gaipur, P.N. Bose has mentioned "we had five best physicians- sunshine, air, water, exercise and diet". Clearly a person who grew up in the lap of nature, this stood him in good stead during his long and tedious survey trips.

1864: At the start of his education, Pramatha Nath came under the influence of the famous Brahmo reformer Keshab Chandra Sen from whom he conceived the idea of going to England for higher education.

1871: A booklet title Abkash Kusum, containing 6 poems were published from Calcutta.

1874: He appeared for the competitive examination and won the coveted Gilchrist Scholarship which was tenable for 5 years.

October 1874 to May 1880: Pramatha Nath stayed in London for six years and pursued the study of Chemistry, botany, zoology, geology, physical geography and logic. He secured the 3rd position in geology while graduating from the London University.

13 May 1880: He joined the Geological Survey of India.

24 June 1882: P.N. Bose married Kamala Dutt

1884: P.N. Bose emphasized the need of writing scientific books in Bengali for the rapid diffusion of scientific knowledge among the masses and thus wrote Prakritik Itihas in Bengali.

1892: He wrote shishupath.

1886: Pramatha Nath in a pamphlet suggested that a ‘Society for the Development of Indian Industries’ should immediately be formed.

1891: Through his efforts an Industrial Conference was organized for the first time in Calcutta

1894 and 1896 During his tenure at the Geological Survey, Pramatha Nath also took time to write his monumental book- "A history of Hindu Civilization under British Rule". It was published in three separate volumes.

1903: The discriminatory policies of the British Government forced Pramatha Nath to retire from the Geological Survey of India.

1904: After leaving the Geological Survey of India he joined the service of Mayurbhanj State and informed J.N. Tata through a letter of the large deposits of iron ore he had discovered.

1906: His efforts for technical and commercial education led to the establishment of Bengal Technical Institute. It proudly stands today as the Jadavpur University, at Calcutta. P.N. Bose was the first honorary principal of the institute.

1934: P.N. Bose passed into the annals of our history at the age of 79.

== Bose in the Geological Survey of India ==
Pramatha Nath Bose joined the Geological Survey of India on May 13, 1880. He began his work with the Geological Survey doing field survey. He would often make useful innovations, such as along with the valuable discoveries that he made. He would often experiment with the coking power of the coal he would find. During the period of his service;

- He carried out surveys of the Narmada Valley, of Rewa State, Central India.
- He examined metalliferous indications in the northern part of the Darjeeling district.
- He made several traverses in Lower Burma when doing Geological research in the region. Before Bose the region was largely impassable, consisting only of a few forest paths.
- He was the first person to report occurrence of trachyte from the Narmada region.
- He discovered iron ores in Gurumahisini and the Mayurbhanj State which led to the foundation of the Tata Iron Works.
- He reported the presence of Lameta and Bagh beds for correlating similar sequences in other parts of India.
- Filled gaps in the geological map in the Mandla district including the greater part of the Bastar State.
- He examined coal out-crops east of Teendaria and was very successful in identifying exposures of coal that were then excavated under his direction.
- He was the first to identify distinct volcanic centers around Mandaleshwar in the Narmada Valley.
- He discovered coal deposits in the Assam region.
- He also reported the manganese deposits in Jabbalpur and Gosalpur district, coal in Darjeeling, copper in Sikkim and Petroleum in Assam.
- He Discovered petroleum deposits in the Khasimar valley
- He was the first person to introduce into the Geological survey of India the study of micro-sections as an aid to petrological work, and to give accounts of micro-sections in Progress Reports.
- He contributed one memoir and thirteen papers to the publications of the Geological Survey.

During his time at the Geological Survey of India, Bose is repeatedly praised by The Director, William King for his excellent and economic work in his reports. He was promoted to Deputy Superintendent Second Grade in August, 1887 and he served as Officiating Superintendent from July 18, 1893, to May 15, 1895. He took a two-year furlough in which he published his work, A History of Hindu Civilization Under British Rule. He returned in 1897 and from 1901 to 1903 he was in charge of the Geological Department of the Presidency College through the connection that the Geological Survey had with the college. He served on the Geological Survey for 23 years when he was forced to retire from the due to discriminatory policies set in place by the British Government in 1903.

== Bengal Technical Institute ==
Pramatha Nath Bose was an advocate of the Swadeshi Movement by writing articles that advocated the necessity of launching industrial enterprises on modern scientific lines. Bose moved for higher education in India and in 1891 he helped organized an Industrial Conference for the first time. This Conference later became the Indian industrial Association which was meant to help fund struggling industry and technical education. As a result of this he was approached by Tarak Nath Palit for advice and help when Palit was founding the Bengal Technical Institute. In 1906 Bose advised Palit and was a large part of the foundation of the Bengal Technical Institute. The Bengal Technical Institute officially started work on July 25, 1906, This institute was meant to educate laborers into skilled laborers first, then more programs existed to train skill laborers into various types of Engineers. The Bengal Technical Institute was largely founded because of the ideals of the Swadeshi Movement and how they applied to national education. In 1910, the Science and Technical departments of the Bengal National College were included in the Bengal Technical Institute, the arts departments stayed under the Bengal National College. Pramatha Nath Bose was connected for the Institute for ten years, retiring from it in July, 1920. The Bengal Technical Institute was renamed to "College of Engineering and Technology Jadavpur" in May, 1929.

== Writings ==
- Bose, P.N., 1880. Undescribed Fossil Carnivora from the Siválik Hills in the Collection of the British Museum. Quarterly Journal of the Geological Society; 1880; v. 36; issue 1-4; p. 119-136.
- Bose, P.N., 1884. Geology of Lower Narbada Valley between Nimawar and Kawant. Memoir Geological Survey of India. 21, pt. 1.
- Bose, P.N., 1896. A History of Hindu Civilization. (3 Volumes)
- Bose, P.N., 1908. Notes on the Geology and Mineral Resources of Rajpipla State. Records of the Geological Survey of India. 37, 167-190.
