= Syed Badrudduja =

Indian politician

- সৈয়দ বদরুদ্দোজা
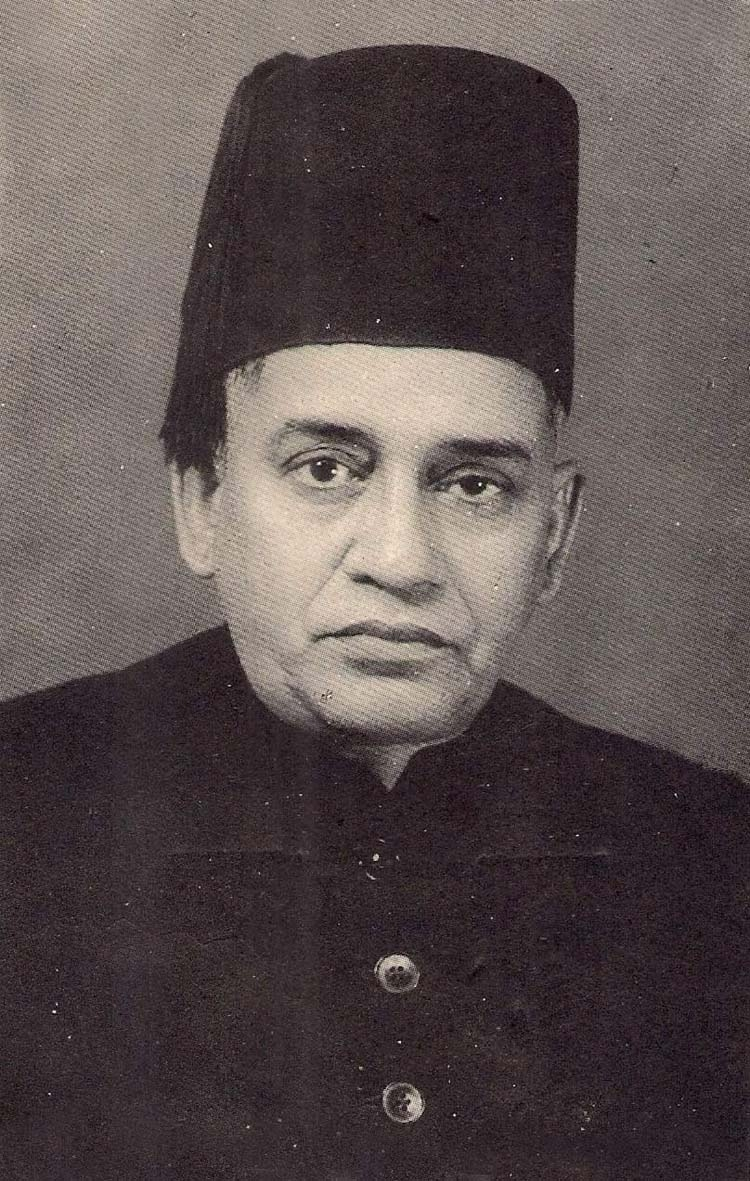

Mayor of Kolkata
- In office 1943 - 1944

Personal details
- Born: 4 January 1900 Murshidabad, Bengal, British India
- Died: 18 November 1974 (aged 74)
- Party: All-India Muslim League
- Children: 10, including Syeda Sakina Islam and Syeda Razia Faiz
- Occupation: Politician

Syed Badrudduja (Bengali: সৈয়দ বদরুদ্দোজা; 4 January 1900 – 18 November 1974) was an Indian-Bengali politician, parliamentarian, and activist. He was a member of West Bengal Legislative Assembly, member of Indian parliament Lok Sabha and the Mayor of Calcutta. He was involved with the anti-colonials movements like Khilafat Movement and Civil Disobedience Movement, and was an advocate of Huseyn Shaheed Suhrawardy's United Bengal proposal.

== Early life and education ==
Badrudduja was born on 4 January 1900 in Talibpur village in Murshidabad district to Syed Abdul Ghafur. He studied at Calcutta Madrassa, Presidency College Calcutta, and the University of Calcutta, and earned an M.A. and an L.L.B.

== Career ==
Badrudduja joined and served as secretary of Progressive Muslim League. He worked in the Indian independence movement with Bengali leaders like Chitta Ranjan Das, Subhas Chandra Bose, and Huseyn Shaheed Suhrawardy. He was also associated with Krishak Praja Party. Later, he became president of Independent Democratic Party. He also served as secretary of the Progressive Assembly Party, Bengal, and as president of the Progressive Coalition Party, Bengal. He was the Mayor of Kolkata from 1943 to 1944. He decided to stay in India after the Partition. He was a member of Bengal Legislative Assembly, 1940–46, Bengal Legislative Council, 1946–47, West Bengal Legislative Assembly, 1948—52 and 1957–62; Member, Third Lok Sabha, 1962—67 and 4th Lok Sabha- 1967-70

== Personal life and death ==
Badrudduja was married to Rakia Khatoon. They had children including Syeda Sakina Islam, Syed Mohammad Ali (d. 2010), Syeda Salma Rahman, Syeda Razia Faiz (1936–2013), Syed Hyder Ali, Syeda Asiya Qadir, Syed Ashraf Ali (1939–2016), Syeda Fatima Islam, Syed Reza Ali and Syeda Zakia Ahsan. He died on 18 November 1974.
