= Hasem Ali Khan =

Bengali politician, lawyer, peasant movement leader and social worker (1888–1962)

Khan Bahadur Moulvi Hashim Ali Khan
- হাসেম আলী খান
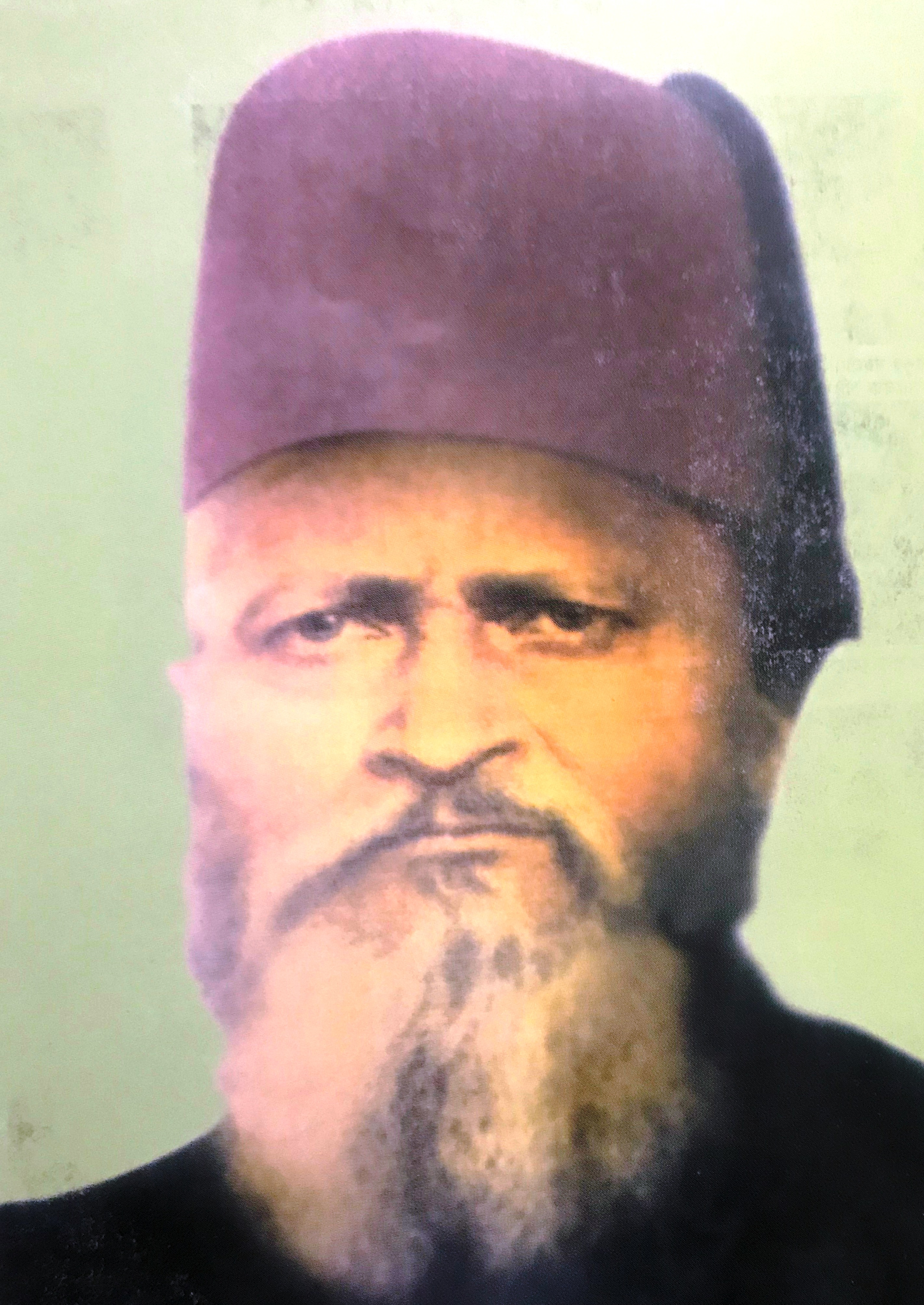

Member of the Bengal Legislative Assembly
- In office 1937–1946
- Succeeded by: Arif Husayn Chowdhury
- Constituency: Bakarganj North

Personal details
- Born: 2 February 1888 Swarupkathi, Backergunge District, Bengal Presidency
- Died: 16 April 1962 (aged 74)
- Children: Fakhrul Islam Khan
- Relatives: Syeda Sakina Islam (daughter-in-law)
- Occupation: Politician, lawyer, peasant movement leader

Khan Bahadur Hashim Ali Khan (Bengali: হাসেম আলী খান; 2 February 1888 – 16 April 1962) was a Bengali politician, lawyer, peasant movement leader and social worker. He was a close associate of A. K. Fazlul Huq. He became a Minister in the Bengal Legislature in 1941 in the second cabinet led by Huq. During his political life, he tried to establish rights of farmers and common people. He was conferred the title of Khan Bahadur by the British Raj as recognition of his contribution for maintaining peaceful relations between people of different faiths.

== Early life ==
Hashim Ali Khan was born on 2 February 1888 at the village of Sehangal located in Swarupkathi Thana of Barisal District into an aristocratic Bengali Muslim Khan Pathan family to Arman Ali Khan and Mossamat Peyara Banu. His ancestor Falah Ali Khan Lodi had arrived in Bengal from Delhi after being granted a Lakheraj of land around the village of Sehangal. Falah Ali Khan was a descendant of the Pashtun tribe of Lodi and was also a descendant of the Sultans of Delhi, being from the lineage of Sultan Ibrahim Khan Lodi. Hashim Ali Khan's father Arman Ali Khan was a Moulvi and Taluqdar in Swarupkathi Thana. In 1906, he passed entrance examination with scholarship. During study at high school level, he became fan of Mahatma Ossini Kumar Dutta and took indoctrination to him. Hashim Ali khan took part against historical Bengal Partisan Movement known as Bango Bhangha during study in Barisal Zila School. Then, he passed FA (now known as Intermediate) Examination in 1908. Afterward, in 1910, he passed BA examination and became Vice principal of Islamia Madrasah. Finally, in 1913, he passed B.L Examination from Kolkata Ripon College and started Law practice at Alipur Court. Then he continued law business at Barisal Bar. He was member of Barisal Bar since 1914 to 1962.

== Personal life ==
When he was law student at Kolkata Ripon College, he married Samisun Nesa. Hashim Ali Khan was the father of four children. They are Samsun Nesa, Lutfun Nesa, Nurul Islam Khan (N.I Khan) and Fakhrul Islam Khan. Hashim Ali Khan's wife Samisun Nesa died in 1928.

== Political career ==
Khan was involved with congress politics since his student life. But, he formally joined with congress politics after starting law business at Barisal bar. He was one of the leading secretaries of Barisal Congress. Though he was active politician of congress, but he believed in armed struggle against British Colonialism for freedom contrasting to congress's satyagraha andolon (Non-cooperation movement). He tried to raise political awareness among farmers and common people as he believed that without mass people's political awareness Indian freedom was impossible. His political guru was Sher-E-Bangla A.K Fazlul Huq and Sir Asutos Mukharji. These persons inspired him to enter in politics. He created Proja Sammittee in Barisal in 1995 on request of A.K Fazlul Huq.

He actively participated in pro-Ottoman Khilafat Movement and non-cooperation movement, and presented inspiring speech for the movement in various meetings. As a part of the movement, he along with fellow lawyers stayed away from law business for three months. After provincial conference held 1921, Khan was selected as divisional secretary in first Barisal Congress Committee. At the height of movement, Hasem Ali Khan along with others broke 144 article order imposed by government against the movement.

On 2 June 1921, Mahatma Gandhi and Mohammad Ali Jauhar visited Barisal after being invited by Khan and Aswini Kumar Dutta. Khan translated the speeches of the two leaders from Hindustani to Bengali for the native audience. The event played an important role in Khan gaining attention and popularity in Bengal. His political wisdom and ability to impress common people eventually helped him to become a successful politician in Bengal. When Khan was Vice President of Barisal Congress, Gandhi again visited Barisal in 1925 to resolve tension between Hindu and Muslim community after the 1923 elections.

However, when farmers lost their right of holding land due to act of permanent settlement by Lord Cornwallis and became victimized by landlord and British tax collectors, then Khan stood beside them to protect and to establish their. He started Proja Andolon (civic movement) in Barisal on request of A. K. Fazlul Huq to preserve and protect rights of farmers. He believed that without uproot of land lordship, civic freedom would impossible. Subsequently, he became the president of Barisal Proja Committee. During his leadership in Barisal Proja Andolon, police and Gurkha army of British rulers fired in a procession of the movement in 1922, many people were wounded and killed. He became very upset and strongly condemned the brutal act of the government. As a Consequence, Mahatma Gandhi called to break Salt Act. Khan mobilise and inspired people to participate in Salt Act break movement which was lasted from 1922 to 1930.

Khan treated Hindu and Muslim equally during his political career. As a consequence, he received respect from both communities equally. He worked hard for keeping unity between Hindu and Muslim to lessen and stop tension between the two communities. For instance, due to Satyagraha Andolon led by Satindranth Sen in Barisal, tension between Muslim and Hindu was arisen. Hasem Ali Khan played an important role to appease the both community and prevented bloodshed. Moreover, he actively participated, led and protested Kulkathi Killings of the Government in Barisal. As continuation of his movement, Hasem Ali Khan formed Bakergonj Mohamedan Association to reserve social and religious rights of the common people. In 1927, British Governor General Donovan Visited Barisal after break out Hindu-Muslim riot. He found that only Hasem Ali Khan can play role to keep peace and Hindu-Muslim unity because of his acceptance to both communities. Mr. Donovan arranged a meetings for alliance between Hindu and Muslim. In that meeting Hasem Ali Khan presented a heart touchy speech emphasizing on the unity of Hindu-Muslim for the freedom of India.

Khan was awarded as Khan Bahadur on 3 June 1935, by the Governor General and viceroy of India for his contribution for Hindu-Muslim Unity and Integrity. He was awarded as 'Khan Bahadur' especially as recognition of his contribution for protecting and preserving Muslim's rights in British India. In addition, the award was also recognition of his contribution to protect legal rights of Muslim Community after incidence of Kulkathi village.

Hasem Ali khan formed Barisal Krishok-Proja (farmers-Civic) Committee and he was president of the committee. In 1934, he became of Bengal legislature from Bakergonj's Kotowali, Nolchiti, Kaukhali, Sorupkhathi, Pirozpur, Nazirpur region of Barisal Mahkuma. In 1936, Hasem Ali Khan contested in Barisal District Board Election under banner of Krishok-Proja Sommitte. Later on, he became the chairman of Barisal District Board by defeating Khan Bahadur Hemayet Uddin. He acted as Chairman of Barisal District Board until 1942.

Khan was re-elected to the Bengal legislature following the Bengal legislative elections, where had run as a Krishak Praja Party candidate, defeating his rival Arif Husayn Chowdhury of the All-India Muslim League. His constituency, Bakarganj North, covered Hizla, Mehendiganj and Muladi. After being elected as member of legislature, he became member of Floud Commission to remove land lordship tradition from Bengal. The commission recommended to remove land lordship tradition from Bengal. Due to their recommendation, land lordship tradition was removed from Bengal in 1950.

In 1937, after forming coalition cabinet, Muslim league and Krishok-Proja Party were restructured. In reformed committee, Hasem Ali Khan was selected as the president of Muslim League of Barisal and concurrently, president of Barisal Krishok-Proja Party. He assisted A.K Fazlul Huq to write historical Lahore Resolution. Hasem Ali Khan also supported Subhas Chandra Bose in Hallow well Movement as close friend of Subas Basu. Fianally, Hasem Ali Khan became minister of Bengal Legislature in 1941 in the second cabinet led by A.K. Fazlul Haque. He was the minister of Debt Settlement Board and Rural Development. On 17 December 1941, he took oath as minister of cooperative and agriculture eviction ministry. As a minister, he brought second amendment in Bengal Farmers Eviction Laws in 1942 in Bengal Assembly. He was active member of Bengal legislature from 1943 to 1946 as well as cabinet minister from December 1941 to March 1943. He also reactivate 11000 debt settlement Board during cabinet membership. In addition, he was the director of the directorate of Education when A.K. Fazlul Huq was the minister of education ministry.

Khan and the Krishak Praja Party were against the Partition of Bengal, and advocated for an independent United Bengal. After the establishing of Pakistan, Khan ended up joining the Muslim League in 1950. He thought, he could contribute more for the people if he involves with Muslim League politics because of the acceptance of Muslim League to general people. Later on, he was elected in Barisal Municipality election as chairman held in 1952 without any contest. In 1950, he was elected as president of Barisal Muslim League.

== Legacy ==
Khan patronised cultural and social activities. He formed Bakerganj Mohammedan Association to preserve and protect right of common people. He re-published the daily Nabajug newspaper in 1941. Famous writers and poets like Abul Mansur Ahmed, Qazi Nazrul Islam, Zainul Abedin were involved with this newspaper. In 1942, S. Wajid Ali published Monthly Gulistha Journal on Khan's request. Khan also assisted to formulate Barisal Women's Society. He also established Shamsunnesa Reading Room in Barisal. He inspired his son Nurul Islam Khan to publish the weekly Khadem magazine. He established Barisal Literature Maslish (Sittings). For economic development, in 1946, Khan and Huq established national Commercial Bank.

== Death ==
Khan died from an accident in 1962. Before his death, he was going to attend to an election campaign in Babuganj by boat. In the way, he was caught by heavy rain and storm, and due to strong current and heavy rain, the boat sank and he drowned. At the time of his death, his age was 75 years.
