= Rup Sanatan =

- রূপ সনাতন
- Directed by: Sunilbaran
- Written by: Sailajananda Mukhopadhyay
- Screenplay by: Sailajananda Mukhopadhyay
- Produced by: Shubho Kalpa Chitram
- Starring: Gurudas Banerjee; Jahor Roy; Jahar Ganguly; Nabadwip Haldar
- Cinematography: Sachin Dasgupta
- Edited by: Amaresh Talukdar
- Music by: Rathin Ghosh
- Color process: Black and white
- Distributed by: Indu Pictures
- Release date: 1 January 1965
- Country: India
- Language: Bengali

Rup Sanatan is a Bengali historical drama film directed by Sunilbaran based on a story of Sailajananda Mukhopadhyay on the life of Rup and Sanatana Goswami, close disciples of Chaitanya Mahaprabhu. It is the last film featured by Nabadwip Haldar. The film was released on 1 January 1965 under the banner of Indu Pictures.

== Plot ==
The film revolves with the spiritual transformation of the brothers, Rupa Goswami and Sanatana Goswami, who initially served as ministers of the Sultan of Bengal, Alauddin Husain Shah. Later they deeply inspired by Chaitanya Mahaprabhu.

== Cast ==
- Gurudas Banerjee
- Molina Devi
- Jahor Roy
- Jahar Ganguly
- Nabadwip Haldar
- Robin Majumdar
- Nitish Mukhopadhyay
- Sipra Mitra
- Prabir Kumar
- Bipin Gupta
- Sabita Bose
