= Vidyasagar (1950 film) =

1950 Bengali film

Vidyasagar is a Bengali biographical drama film directed by Kali Prasad Ghosh and produced by M.P. Productions based on the life of renowned philanthropist and educator, Ishwar Chandra Vidyasagar. This film was released on 29 September 1950 under the banner of Deluxe Film Distributors Ltd. This was the highest-grossing Indian Bengali film of 1950.

== Plot ==
The film portrays the journey of eminent Bengali scholar Vidyasagar and covers his entire life, how Ishwar Chandra Bandyopadhyay became one of the greatest personalities of the Bengal Renaissance and social reformers from a poor family of Midnapore district. It highlights his dedication to fight against social curses like child marriage, illiteracy and the oppression of widows.

== Cast ==
- Pahadi Sanyal as Vidyasagar
- Kamal Mitra as Rev. Krishnamohan
- Utpal Dutt as Michael Madhusudan Dutt
- Anup Kumar
- Chhabi Biswas
- Ahindra Choudhury
- Gurudas Banerjee as Sri Ramakrishna
- Molina Devi
- Haridhan Mukherjee
- Jahor Roy
- Sukhen Das
- Shobha Sen
- Tarakumar Bhaduri
- Harimohan Bose
- Nibhanani Devi
- Sandhya Devi
