= Mandir (film) =

- Directed by: Abdul Rashid Kardar
- Produced by: Shankar Talkies Corporation
- Starring: Rajkumari; Dhiraj Bhattacharya; Anees Khatoon; Akhtar Nawaz
- Music by: Professor Ramzan Khan
- Production company: Shankar Talkies Corporation
- Release date: 1937
- Country: India
- Language: Hindi

Mandir (The Temple) is a 1937 Indian Hindi devotional film directed by A. R. Kardar. Produced for the Shankar Talkies Corporation, it had music by Professor Ramzan Khan. The lyricist was Manjhar Hashiri.

The cast included Rajkumari, Dhiraj Bhattacharya, Anees Khatoon, Agha and Akhtar Nawaz.

== Cast ==
- Dhiraj Bhattacharya
- Mahmood Shah
- Rajkumari
- Anees Khatoon
- Akhtar Nawaz
- Agha
- A. R. Pahelwan
- R. P. Kapoor

== Soundtrack ==
The music director was Professor Ramzan Khan and the lyrics were written by Manjjar Hashiri.

=== Song list ===
#	Title
1	"Sunheri Duniya Par Kyun Gazab Giraya Ram"
2	"Manao Gao Aaj Badhai Dukh Ke Din Gaye Beet"
3	"O Bhar De Bhr De Bhagwati Hamare Bhandaar Ko"
4	"Tumhe Ho Gyan Tumhin Se Dhyan"
5	"Tripuraari Tum Bhakton Ke Ho Dukh Haari"
6	"Karega Bhala Tera Bhagwan"
7	"Kya Kya Na Kar Raha Hai Duniya Mein Naam Tera"
8	"Khush Ho Ki Bel Booton Ne Gaayi Bahaar Hai"
9	"Jab Jab Hui Dharam Ki Haani"
10	"Jai Jai Durga Mai Kar De Ek Bhalayi"
11	"Jaago Murli Mukutdhari Zulmon Se Roti Hai"
12	"Jhoolao Gao Hari Ko Jhoole Min Jhulao"
