= Mrinalini (novel) =

1869 novel by Bankim Chandra Chattopadhyay

- Author: Bankim Chandra Chattopadhyay
- Original title: মৃণালিনী
- Language: Bengali
- Genre: Novel
- Publication date: 1869
- Publication place: India
- Media type: Print

Mrinalini is a Bengali novel written by Bankim Chandra Chatterjee. The novel was first published in 1869. This was Chatterjee's third novel, and he was 30 years old when the novel was first published.

== History-linking ==
In the first decade of the 13th century, Bakhtiyar Khilji made a surprise attack on Nabadwip with only seventeen cavalry (versus eighteenth cavalry). King Lakshmana Sen was busy to eating and had no preparation for battle despite the foresight of the attack. The king fled to Vikrampur by boat with his family. The story of escape always tormented the literary emperor. He had a lot of faith in the bravery of Bengali's. He tried to reduce the tainted history of such surrender of Bengali's through his writing with the weapon of imagination. Mrinalini, Hemchandra, Pashupati, Manorama, Girijaya, Digvijay - all characters are fictional. Only Bakhtiyar Khilji Katrik's invasion and conquest of Navadwip is furnished with historical background. The rest of the characters and events are entirely fictional.

== Plot ==
The story revolves around the prince of Magadha, Hemchandra and his lover Mrinalini, a middle-class girl from Mathura. When they both falls in love, Hemchandra becomes weak and forgets about his duties for his country. Yavana captured his kingdom but instead of fighting with Yavanas he was marrying secretly with Mrinalini.

To make Hemchandra realize about his duties, Madhvacharya, Hemchandra's teacher secretly sends Mrinalini to Rishikesh's house in the Gond Kingdom. What will happen when Hemchandra gets to know about Madhvacharya's conspiracy? Will he succeed in his mission? Is Madhvacharya a betrayer? What will happen when society gets know about Hemchandra and Mrinalini's marriage? Will society accept it?

== Characters ==
- Mrinalini a middle- class beautiful girl from Mathura who was in love with the prince of Magadha, Hemchandra. She was sent away to Lakshmanavati to a rich Brahmin Rishikesh by Madhvacharya, the family priest of Hemchandra because Hemchandra forgotten his duties while in love with her. She, there at Rishikesh's house became a good friend of his daughter, Manimalini and she told her about her secret marriage with Hemchandra. Hemchandra sent Girijaayaa, his female servant to Mrinalini at Lakshmanavati to send a message to her that they can't unite until Hemchandra suppress Bakhtiar Khilji from Magadha. She, then become a good friend of Girijaayaa and was tried to molest by Byomkesh, womanizer son of Rishikesh. She was thrown out of the house by Rishikesh after this misunderstanding and false accusation of Byomkesh that Mrinalini has some illegal relationships with other men. Mrinalini then moved to Gaud, where Hemchandra with the help of Madhvacharya was helping the king to throw out Yavanas from India. After many attempts, Hemchandra United with Mrinalini after passing out so many conspiracies and hurdles.
- Hemchandra the prince of Magadha and husband of Mrinalini
- Pashupati Minister of Gaud who actually supports Bakhtiar Khilji.
- Bakhtiar Khilji was the king of Yonas.
- Girijaayaa friend of Mrinalini
- Digvijay husband of Girijaayaa
- Manimalini friend of Mrinalini
- Lakshmansen King of Gaud
- Shaantsheel messenger of Pashupati

== Film adaptation ==
The novel was adapted into a silent black-and-white feature film titled Mrinalini (1930 film), directed by Jyotish Bandyopadhyay under the banner of Madan Theatre.
