= Chattogram Astragar Lunthan =

1949 Bengali film

Chattogram Astragar Lunthan is a Bengali historical drama film directed by Nirmal Chowdhury produced by S. D. Narang based on the Chittagong armoury raid led by Masterda Surya Sen. This film was released on 27 November 1949 under the banner of Bengal National Studios. The iconic Nazrul Geeti, Karar Oi Louho Kopat was first recorded by folk singer Girin Chakraborty in this film.

== Plot ==
Surya Sen, a local teacher and freedom fighter made the blueprint to attack Chattagram armoury with a number of his students. Finally he makes a situation of armed rebellion in Chittagong. It challenges the imperialist British administration. The British Government deploys the Army to kill the young revolutionaries.

== Cast ==
- Dipak Mukherjee
- Banani Choudhury
- Bhaben Majumdar
- Gautam Mukherjee
- Shriti Rekha Biswas
- Dipti Roy
