= Nabadwip Haldar =

Indian Bengali actor

- Born: 1911; Sonpalashi, Burdwan district, Bengal Presidency, British India
- Died: Calcutta, West Bengal, India
- Occupations: Actor, Comedian
- Known for: Work in Bengali cinema

Nabadwip Haldar was an Indian actor, comedian and theater personality who is known for his work in Bengali cinema.

== Early life ==
Haldar was born in 1911 in Sonpalashi village, near Hatgobindapur, in undivided Burdwan district in British India. After completion of his primary education from Burdwan Municipal High School, he could not study further and started working at Calcutta Electric Supply Corporation. Haldar also took part-time jobs in different companies in Kolkata.

== Career ==
Haldar's debut film was Panchashar made by Debaki Kumar Bose in 1931. He became popular for his character named Madan in the film Sharey Chuattor (1953). Haldar performed in a comedy duo with actor Shyam Laha in various films as the Bengali version of Laurel and Hardy. He was well known for his unique voice and comic roles. He also acted in a number of radio comic series.

== Partial filmography ==
- Panchashar (1931)
- Graher Fer (1937)
- Sonar Sansar (1936)
- Sarbajanin Bibahotsab (1938)
- Shahar Thekey Durey (1943)
- Dukkhe Jader Jibon Gora (1946)
- Kalo Chhaya (1948)
- Sadharan Meye (1948)
- Kuasha (1949)
- Sandhabelar Roopkatha (1950)
- Kankantala Light Railway (1950)
- Baikunther Will (1950)
- Maryada (1950)
- Hanabari (1952)
- Manikjor (1952)
- Sharey Chuattor (1953)
- Lakh Taka (1953)
- Moyla Kagaj (1954)
- Chheley Kaar (1954)
- Nishiddho Phal (1955)
- Saheb Bibi Golam (film) (1956)
- Dui Bechara (1960)
- Kathin Maya (1961)
- Marutrisha (1964)
- Rup Sanatan (1965)
