= Kalo Chhaya =

1948 film by Premendra Mitra

Kalo Chhaya (Dark Shadows) is a Bengali suspense thriller film directed by Premendra Mitra and produced by Gouranga Prasad Basu. This film was released on 17 December 1948 under the banner of Eastern Studio.

== Plot ==
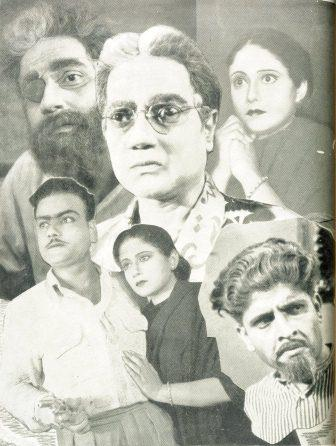
film still

A lady visited Mr. Surajit Roy, a detective, with a proposal to steal a will from a landlord's house. Surajit did not accept the assignment. Soon after, he received a telegram from one Rajib Lochan Choudhury, zamindar of a remote village in Murshidabad district. It appeared that Rajib Lochan's life was in danger. When Surajit visited his house the zaminder had already been murdered. Detective Surajit started an investigation while staying at the house. He saw a nurse, Anima, appointed for Rajib Lochan and recalled that this lady went to him with the proposal of theft. There were several relatives and servants in the house but most of them concealed some other facts from him. Finally Surajit was successful to track down the real culprit.

== Cast ==
- Dhiraj Bhattacharya as Dinannath Chowdhury/Rajib lochan Chowdhury
- Sisir Mitra as Detective Surajit Roy
- Nabadwip Haldar as Surajit's assistant
- Gurudas Banerjee as Doctor alias Pitambar Chowdhury
- Shyam Laha as Chinese Cook
- Sipra Mitra as Anima Devi, nurse
- Nani Majumdar
- Haridas Chatterjee
