= Syed Ashraf Ali =

Bangladeshi writer, scholar, and broadcaster (1939–2024)

- Born: 1939; Kolkata, British India
- Died: March 19, 2024 (aged 84–85); Dhaka, Bangladesh
- Occupations: Writer; Islamic scholar; broadcaster
- Known for: Role in Bangladesh Liberation War, Islamic scholarship, media presence
- Spouse: Sultana Ali
- Children: Syed Mohammad Ali Zain

Syed Ashraf Ali (1939 – March 19, 2024) was a Bangladeshi writer, Islamic scholar, and broadcaster. He is a former Director General of the Islamic Foundation Bangladesh. He was known for his contributions to Islamic studies, his role in Bangladesh Liberation War, and his work with various media outlets, including Bangladesh Television and ATN Bangla.

== Early life and education ==
Ali was born in 1939 to Syed Badrudduja, a former mayor of Kolkata and a member of India's Lok Sabha, and Rakia Badrudduja. He pursued his early education at St. Xavier's College, Kolkata and later attended the University of Calcutta.

== Career ==
In 1964, Ali moved to the then East Pakistan and joined Radio Pakistan.

During the early stages of the Bangladesh Liberation War in 1971, Ali worked to establish the Swadhin Bangla Betar Kendra (Independent Bengal Radio Station) in Chittagong. This station played a vital role in broadcasting pro-independence messages and creating sentiment against the Pakistani occupation.

Ali authored several books and treatises on Islam and regularly wrote newspaper articles on various subjects, including religion and music. Ali hosted Islamic programs on Bangladesh Television and ATN Bangla.

== Death ==
Ali died on 19 March 2024 at Eden Multicare Centre in Dhaka while undergoing treatment for lung complications. Ali's funeral prayer was held after Zuhr prayers at Baitul Mukarram National Mosque on the same day. He was later buried at the Mirpur Martyred Intellectual Graveyard.

== Personal life ==
Ali was married to Sultana Ali, and they had a son, Syed Mohammad Ali Zain.
