= Bireswar Vivekananda =

1964 film

- Directed by: Madhu Bose
- Based on: Life of Swami Vivekananda
- Starring: Amaresh Das; Gurudas Bandyopadhyay; Molina Debi
- Music by: Anil Bagchi
- Production company: Sebak Chitra Pratisthan
- Release date: 1964
- Country: India
- Language: Bengali

Bireswar Vivekananda is a 1964 Indian Bengali-language biographical film about the Indian Hindu religious leader, Swami Vivekananda. The film was directed by Madhu Bose. The film was made under the banner of Sebak Chitra Pratisthan. Anil Bagchi was the music composer of this film. Amaresh Das played the main character and Swami Vivekananda and Gurudas Bandyopadhyay played the character Ramakrishna.

== Cast ==
- Amaresh Das as Swami Vivekananda
- Gurudas Bandyopadhyay as Ramakrishna
- Molina Debi
- Mihir Bhattacharya
- Bipin Gupta
- Jahar Ganguly
- Gangapada Basu
- Jiben Bose
- Premangshu Bose
- Purnendu Mukherjee as Maharshi
- Priti Majumdar
- Swapan Kumar

== See also ==
- Swami Vivekananda (1955 film), film directed by Amar Mullick
