= Krishnakanter Will (1932 film) =

- Directed by: Jyotish Bannerjee
- Written by: Krishnakanter Will by Bankim Chandra Chatterjee
- Starring: Ahindra Choudhury; Dhiraj Bhattacharya; Santi Gupta; Nirmalendu Lahiri
- Cinematography: T. Marconi; Monglu
- Distributed by: Shri Bharatlaxmi Pictures
- Release date: 1932
- Country: India
- Language: Bengali

Krishnakanter Will is a Bengali drama film directed by Jyotish Bannerjee based on the 1878 same name novel of Bankim Chandra Chatterjee. This film was released in 1932 under the banner of Shri Bharatlaxmi Pictures. it is the first talkie adaptation of this novel. Prior to this talkie version, Krishnakanter Will had been adapted into a silent film in 1926 as Krishnakanter Will directed by Priyanath Ganguly.

== Plot ==
Landlord Krishnakanta Ray decides to divide his estate in equal parts between his elder son Haralal and nephew, Gobindalal. Haralal attempts to forge the will with the help of Rohini, a young widow. Rohini regrets her actions and falls love with Gobindalal. Gobindalal's wife Bhromor leaves him and Krishnakanta alters his will and provide Gobindalal's entire share to Bhromor. Devastated Gobindalal realises his fault and reunites with dying Bhromor.

== Cast ==
- Ahindra Choudhury as Krishnakanta Ray
- Dhiraj Bhattacharya
- Santi Gupta as Bhromor
- Nirmalendu Lahiri as Gobindalal
- Shishubala as Rohini
- Niradasundari as Khiri
- Manorama
- Menaka Dutta
- Jaynarayan Mukhyopadhyay
- Krishnadhan Mukhyopadhyay
