= Dhiraj Bhattacharya =

Indian Bengali actor (1905–1959)

Dhiraj Bhattcharya
- ধীরাজ ভট্টাচার্য
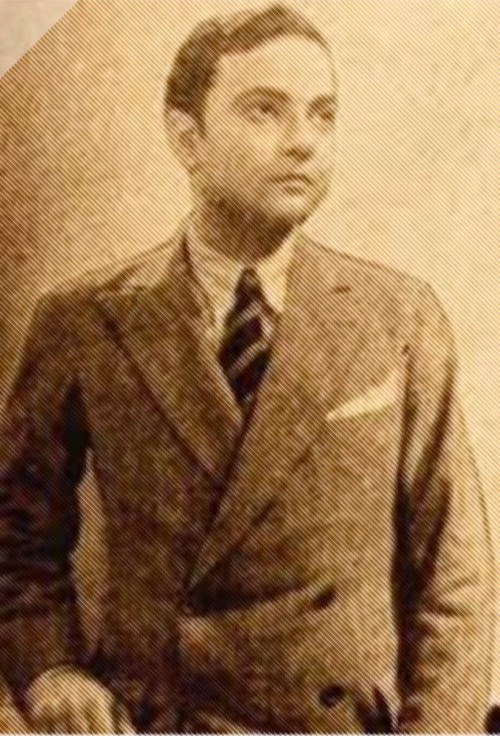
- Born: 5 November 1905; Pajia, Keshabpur, Jessore District, Bengal Presidency, British India (now Pajia, Keshabpur, Jashore, Bangladesh)
- Died: 1959 (aged 53–54) (aged 53/54); Calcutta, West Bengal, India,(Now Kolkata, West Bengal, India)
- Education: Mitra Institution, Ashutosh College
- Occupation: Film actor

Dhiraj Bhattacharya (5 November 1905 - 1959) was an actor of Bengali and Hindi cinema who began in silent films. He was also a theater personality and writer.

== Early life ==
Bhattacharya was born in a zamindar family of Panjia village, near Jessore, in British India. His father's name was Lalit Mohan Bhattacharya. He entered Mitra Institution, Kolkata and passed matriculation in 1923. He joined Ashutosh College to study literature but could not finish his studies. Bhattacharya joined the police service before becoming an actor.

== Career ==
Bhattacharya started his acting career after joining Madan Theatre. His first film Sati Lakhsmi was released in 1925 but he first gained recognition from Charu Roy's movie Bengalee. He worked with Madhu Basu in Giribala, and acted in several detective and thriller films of Premendra Mitra. Bhattacharya was popular for his romantic performances as well as his innovative skills in portraying villainous characters. After becoming established as a film actor he turned to the theatre.

== Filmography ==
- Sati Lakshmi (1925)
- Giribala (1929)
- Kal Parinaya (1930) as Manindra
- Mrinalini (1930)
- Annapurna (1932)
- Nauka Dubi (1932)
- Radha Krishna (1933 film)
- Krishnakanter Will (1932 film)
- Jamuna Puliney (1933) as lord Krishna
- Chand Saudagar (1934) as Lakhindar
- Daksha Yagna (1934) as Mahadev
- Chandragupta (1934)
- Satya Pathe (1935)
- Basabdatta (1935) as Upagupta
- Kanthahaar (1935) Gaourikanta
- Krishna Sudama (1936)
- Sonar Sansar (1936) as Raghu
- Bangalee (1936) as Nishith
- Khooni Kaun (1936)
- Balaa Ki Raat a.k.a. One Fatal Night (1936)
- Rajgee (1937) as Dwijesh
- Chinnahar (1937) as Loknath
- Abhinay (1938) as Hirak
- Sarbbajanin Bibahatsab (1938) as Mathur
- Rupor Jhumko (short film) (1938)
- Parasmani (1939) as Bhabatosh
- Pathik (1939)
- Nara Narayan (1939)
- Kumkum (1940) as Chandan
- Kumkum The Dancer (1940)
- Byabadhan (1940) as Arun
- Rajkumarer Nirbasan (1940) as Kumar Prakash chandra/Naren
- Ahuti (1941)
- Epar Opar (1941) as Prabir
- Shakuntala (1941) as King Dushyant
- Banglar Meye (1941)
- Nandini (1941)
- Pashaan Debata (1942)
- Abhayer Biye (1942)
- Milan (1942)
- Dabi (1943)
- Dwanda (1943)
- Nilanguriya (1943)
- Samadhan (1943) as Lokesh
- Swamir Ghar (1943)
- Sahdhharmini (1943)
- Sahar Theke Dure (1943) as Doctor
- Wapas (1943) as Rajan
- Irada(1944)
- Bideshini (1944)
- Kato Dur (1945)
- Mane Na Mana (1945)
- Sri Durga (1945)
- Mandir (1946)
- Natun Khabor (1947)
- Taruner Swapna (1948)
- Saankha Sindur (1948)
- Pratibad (1948)
- Banchita (1948)
- Joyjatra (1948)
- Kalo Chhaya (1948) as Dinanath/Rajiblochan
- Kuasha (1949)
- Bandhur Path (1949)
- Ekeyi Gramer Chhele (1950)
- Kankal (1950) as Abhay
- Kankantala Light Railway (1950)
- Pathaharar Kahini (1950)
- Rakter Tan (1950)
- Kalsaap (1951)
- Chiner Putul (1951)
- Setu (1951)
- Niyoti (1951)
- Swapna o' samadhi (1952)
- Hanabari (1952)
- Dui Beyayi (1953)
- Chikitsha Sankat (1953)
- Ora Thake Odhare (1954) as Shibnath Babu
- Maraner Pare (1954)
- Moyla Kagaj (1954)
- Maa o' Chhele (1954)
- Sanjher Pradip (1955) as Tridip
- Dakinir Char (1955)
- Mahanisha (1956) as Aparna's Grandfather
- Amar Bou (1956)
- Shadhak ramprasad (1956)
- Adarsha Hindu Hotel (1957) as Hajari Thakur
- Neela Chole Mahaprabhu (1957)
- Bardidi(1957) as Mathur Babu
- Raat ekta (1957)
- Bagha Jatin (1958)
- Manmoyee Girls School (1958)
- Dhumketu (1958)
- lilakanka (1958)
- Aparadh (1960)
- Gariber Meye (1960)

== Bibliography ==
Bhattacharya published his autobiographical story in two parts, He also wrote a few story books:

- Jakhan Police Chilam
- Jakhan Nayak Chilam
- Mahua Milan
- Sajano Bagan
- Mon Nie Khela
