= Sadhana Bose =

Indian actress and dancer

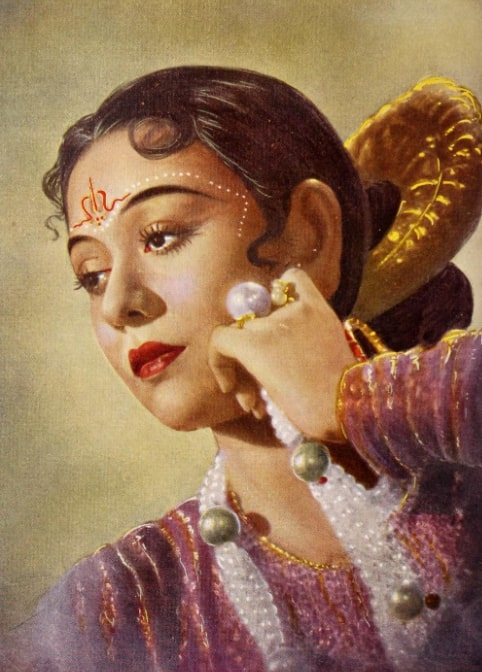
- Bose in the film Vish Kanya
- Born: Sadhana Sen; 20 April 1914; Kolkata, India
- Died: 3 October 1973 (aged 59); Kolkata
- Other name: Sadhona Bose
- Occupations: Actress, danceuse
- Spouse: Madhu Bose
- Relatives: Naina Devi (sister); Benita Roy (sister); Keshab Chandra Sen (grandfather)

Sadhana Bose (20 April 1914 – 3 October 1973) (Sadhona Bose) was an Indian actress and a dancer. She acted in movies like Meenakshi, where she played the lead.

A contemporary of Uday Shankar, in the 1930s she staged a number of ballets in Kolkata, including Bhookh on Bengal famine which was a pioneering work in presenting contemporary themes on stage and Omar Khayyam. Timir Baran, having left Uday Shankar's team, composed music for his performances and Tapas Sen did lighting design for her productions.

== Personal life ==
Born Sadhana Sen, she was the grand daughter of Keshab Chandra Sen, a social reformer and Brahmo Samaj member and daughter of Saral Sen. She later married film director Madhu Bose, son of Pramatha Nath Bose, a pioneering geologist and paleontologist and Kamala Dutt an educationalist and founder of Kamala Girls School and daughter of Romesh Chunder Dutt.

She was so popular as a glamorous heroine of the silver screen in the 1930s and 1940s that her face appeared in the Otene snow to enhance its brand value in the market during interwar years. Her younger sister Naina Devi (original name Nilina Sen) was a legendary classical singer. Her two paternal aunts were Maharanis of two well known princely states of Eastern India: Maharani Suniti Devi Sen of Cooch Behar and Maharani Sucharu Devi of Mayurbhanj.

Granddaughter of Brahmakesari Keshab Chandra Sen, Sadhona was born in a prosperous Brahmo family and received education as was common with Brahmo girls of those days. Her father was Saral Chandra Sen and she was the second of his three daughters. Her elder sister Benita Roy was married into a royal family of Chittagong (now in Bangladesh) and settled to household life, while the youngest Nilina pursued a career in Indian Classical music and earned herself a position of eminence and was known in record circles as Naina Devi. Sadhona married Madhu Bose, film maker working in Bengal, British India, at a young age, and joined the Calcutta Art Players, a theatrical company owned by husband Modhu Bose and took part as heroine in the plays produced by the unit. Later on Sadhona joined films and played Marjina in Alibaba (1937), made in Bengali under the banner of Bharatlakshmi Pictures. This film was a runaway hit and is remembered well by film enthusiasts. Modhu Bose had earlier directed a number of films but he tasted real success with Alibaba. For Sadhona this film meant a permanent place in the history of Bengali films. This was followed with Abhinoy (Bengali-1938), another major success for the couple. They migrated to Bombay and again created history with the immensely popular Kumkum (1940), made in two languages, Hindi and Bengali and thereafter went on to create the first triple version (English, Bengali, Hindi) film of India, Rajnartaki (1941). Sadhona did come back to Calcutta for a double version Bengali movie Meenakshi (1942)with the handsome Jyoti Prakash as the hero. Going back to Bombay soon after the completion of this film where she starred in major films like Shankar Parvati, Vishkanya, Paigham and others and firmly established herself as a heroine in her own right without the backing of her husband. In fact they had separated but she came back to Calcutta after a reconciliation with Modhu and acted in films again directed by her husband like Shesher Kabita and Maa O Chhele, with some limited success. Sadhona was an excellent dancer and almost all her film successes were in dancing roles. She was also a very fine actress and singer, too. She sang her own songs in some of her films including her first Alibaba. With film offers becoming too infrequent, she formed a dance troupe of her own and made all India tours with plays like Wither now, Hunger and others and met with success again. Even Just before her death she got appointed as dance trainer in Calcutta's prestigious Star Theatre, courtesy her one time friend Timir Baran. She trained junior artistes for the play Janapad Badhu and once again her name featured in the newspapers in the advertisements of the play. However, she died in September 1973.
