= Bhudev Mukhopadhyay =

Bengali writer and intellectual

Bhudev Mukhopadhyay CIE
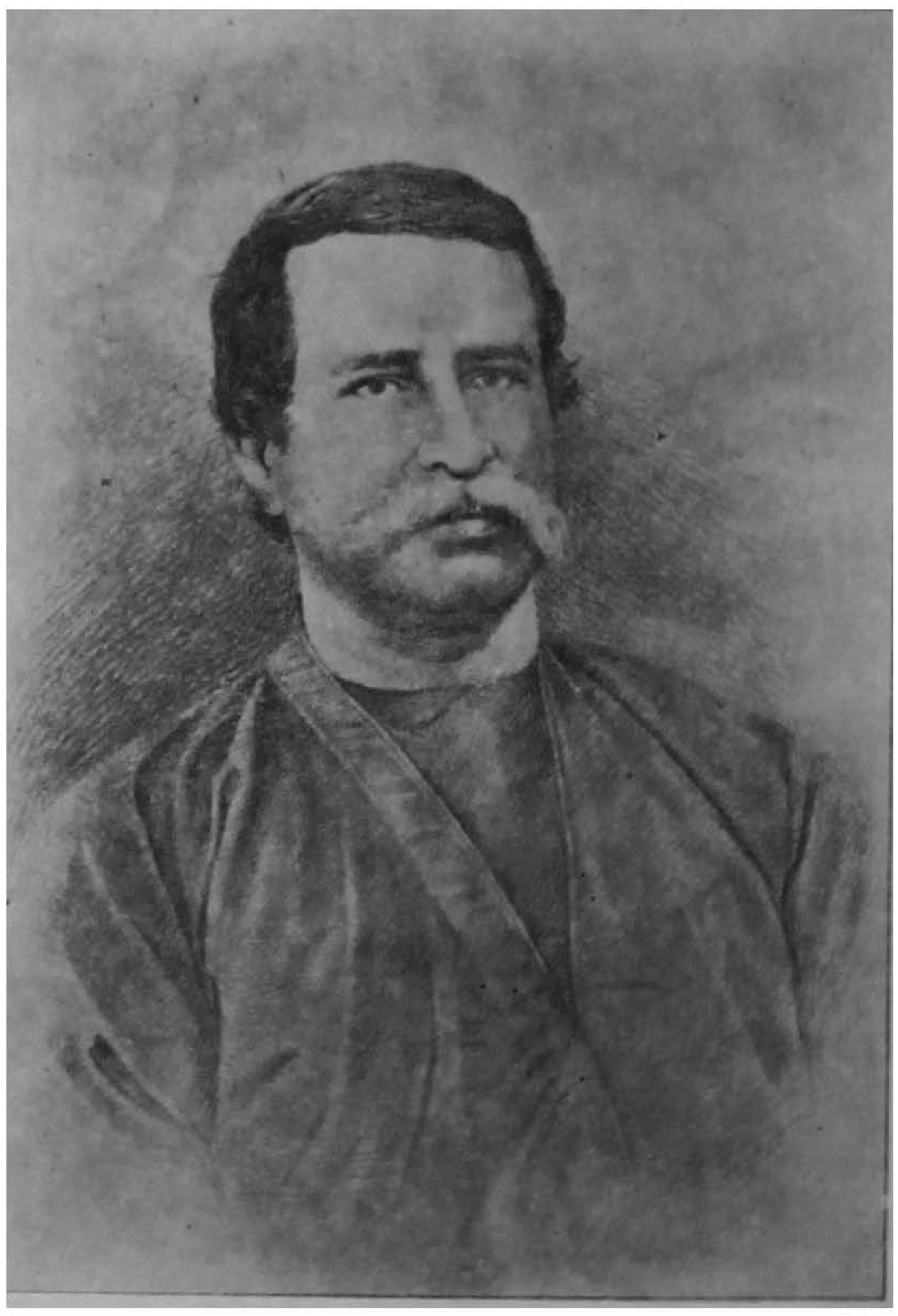
- Born: 22 February 1827; Calcutta, Bengal Presidency, British India (present-day Kolkata, West Bengal, India)
- Died: 15 May 1894 (aged 67); Calcutta, Bengal Presidency
- Education: Aliah University (then known as Mohammedan College of Calcutta)
- Occupations: Educator; Writer

Bhudev Mukhopadhyay (22 February 1827 – 15 May 1894) was a writer and intellectual in 19th century Bengal. His works were considered ardent displays of nationalism and philosophy in the period of the Bengal Renaissance. His novel Anguriya Binimoy (1857) was the first historical novel written in Bengal. He introduced the idea of Bharat Mata (Mother India), a national personification of India as a mother goddess.

== Early life ==
He was born at Calcutta, Haritaki Bagan Lane in North Kolkata on 22 February 1827 to Pandit Biswanath Tarkabhusan, a renowned Sanskrit scholar. His ancestral village was Natibpur (Khanakul) in Hooghly District. He was a student of Sanskrit College and Hindu College, studying at the same time as other Bengal Renaissance figures such as Michael Madhusudan Dutt. After completing his education at Hindu College, Bhudev became the headmaster of the Hindu Hitarthi School in 1846. He later founded Chandannagar Seminary and taught there. In 1848, he joined Calcutta Madrasa (Madrasa 'Aliya) as English teacher. In 1856, he was selected for the post of Principal of Hooghly Normal School through a competitive examination for which his former class-mate Michael Madhusudan Dutt was also a candidate.

== Later career ==
In 1862 he was appointed Assistant Inspector of Schools. He was appointed as the first Indian headmaster of Howrah Zilla School. He was later appointed Inspector of Schools and served in the states of Bengal, Bihar and Odisha. Recognizing his services, Mukhopadhyay was awarded the CIE (Companion of the Order of the Indian Empire) in 1877 by the British.

In 1882 he was appointed as Director of Public Instruction and was also nominated to the Lt.-Governor's Council and the Education Commission later that year. Mukhopadhyay retired from public service in 1883. He was also involved with several educational journals including Shiksadarpan O Sangbadsar and the Education Gazette, which he edited. This involvement lasted from 1868 until his retirement.

His sense of nationalism was so strong that the English principal of Presidency College once noted, "Bhudev with his CIE and 1500 a month is still anti-British."

== Writings ==
Mukhopadhyay was a renowned writer and thinker and combined nationalism with rationalism in his works. He strived to reform Hindu customs and family laws to synergize with modern times. He had an immense knowledge of Sanskrit, as evidenced by his numerous essays, and critiques of Sanskrit literature. He wrote several books for young people, historical novels and fused many different philosophies into characters he portrayed.

He introduced the idea of Bharat Mata (Bhārat Mātā, Mother India) in a satirical work Unabimsa Purana or The Nineteenth Purana which was first published anonymously in 1866. Bharat Mata became a national personification of India as a mother goddess.

== Works ==
- Paribarik Prabandha (1882) - essay
- Samajik Prabandha (1892) - essay
- Achar Prabandha (1895) - essay
- Prakrtik Bijnan (in two parts, 1858 & 1859) - Book
- Purabrttasar (1858) - Book
- Englander Itihas (1862) - Book
- Romer Itihas (1862) - Book
- Banglar Itihas (3rd Part, 1904) - Book
- Ksetratattva (1862) - Book
- Puspanjali (1st part, 1876) - Book
- Anguriya Binimoy (1857) - Novel
- Aitihasik Upanyas (1857) - Historical Novel
- Svapnalabdha Bharatbarser Itihas (1895) - Novel
