= Madhu Bose =

Indian film director

Modhu Bose
- Born: 12 February 1900; Kolkata, India
- Died: 3 October 1969 (aged 69); Kolkata
- Education: Vidyasagar College
- Occupations: Actor, director
- Spouse: Sadhana Bose
- Father: Pramatha Nath Bose
- Relatives: Romesh Chunder Dutt (maternal-grandfather)

Modhu Bose (1900–1969) was an Indian film director, actor, singer and screenwriter active from the 1930s to the 1960s. He was born on 12 February 1900 at 63 Dharmatala Street, Kolkata. His mother was Kamala Dutt Bose, a renowned educator who founded the Kamala Girls School at Ballygunge. She was the daughter of Romesh Chunder Dutt. His father was Pramatha Nath Bose, a geologist and palaeontologist who first discovered iron deposits in Jamshedpur and was instrumental in the setting up of Jamshedpur by writing to J. N. Tata about the rich iron ore reserves. Pramatha Nath Bose is credited with the setting up of the first soap factory in India

== Education ==
He received his early education from Brahmacharya Balok Bidyaloy in Bolpur, Shantiniketan, after that some time in Darjeeling. His singing acting talent earned him favour from Rabindranath Tagore and he was chosen to work a part in Tagore's Valmiki-Pratibha play alongside the writer Tagore himself. But before the play was dragged his father was transferred and he had to go Ranchi and had to leave Shantiniketan. The family moved around the India often, which brought him in contact with different classes of people and different castes of people. He later studied at Vidyasagar College, Calcutta.

== Struggling days ==
He started working in a series of desk jobs for short stint. Bose came into acting under Sisir Bhaduri. Soon after he entered film briefly as an actor at Madan Theatres in 1923. He also Assisted J. J. Madan on the making of Turki Hoor (1924). After an accidental meeting with Himanshu Rai, one of the pioneers of Indian cinema working in Jaipur for legendary German filmmaker Franz Osten, he started to assist Himanshu Rai.

He later scored himself an internship with Osten for a stipend of Rs. 200 every month. He diligently handled everything from production to marketing for the making of Prem Sanyas (1925), a film adapted from the book The Light of Asia (1879) in verse, by Edwin Arnold, based on the life of Prince Siddhartha Gautama, who founded Buddhism by becoming the Buddha or the "Enlightened one". The film went on to be a moderate hit. Later Bose's hard work in this field was recognised and he was invited to Emelka Studio in Munich, Germany where he learnt how to use handheld Pathé cameras, film directing, film development and editing. Soon after, he had the chance to meet Alfred Hitchcock. He went to London and assisted cameraman Baron Gaetano Ventigmilia on a Hitchcock film (probably The Mountain Eagle, 1926). This way he became the first filmmaker from India to work closely with a director in a major Hollywood set-up. He also worked with Karl Freund at UFA (probably on Lang's Metropolis (film), 1925) and shot a Burmese film for the London Film Company, Rangoon, probably in 1927.

== Personal life ==
He married actress Sadhana Bose. He was an uncle of director Amit Bose. Madhu Bose died in 1969.

== Awards ==
- Won, Certificate of Merit (Bengali Feature Film) 1956

== Selected filmography ==
As a director

1. Giribala (1929)
2. Dahlia (1930)
3. Khyber Falcon (1932)
4. Selima (1935)
5. Bala Ki Raat (1936)
6. Alibaba (also acted) (1937)
7. Abhinaya (1938)
8. Kumkum the Dancer (1940)
9. Raj Nartaki (1941)
10. Meenakshi (1942)
11. Michael Madhusudhan (1950)
12. Raakhi (1953)
13. Shesher Kabita (1953)
14. Vikram Urvashi (1954)
15. Mahakavi Girishchandra (1954)
16. Paradhin (1954)
17. Shubha Lagna (1956)
18. Bireshwar Vivekananda (1964)
